= 1965 in film =

The year 1965 in film involved several significant events, with The Sound of Music topping the U.S. box office and winning five Academy Awards. Fox Film (now 20th Century-Fox), Universal City, California and Universal Studios Lot celebrated their 50th anniversaries.

== Top-grossing films (U.S.) ==
The top ten 1965 released films by box office gross in North America are as follows:

Highest-grossing films of 1965
Rank	Title	Distributor	Domestic rentals
1	The Sound of Music	20th Century Fox	$72,000,000
2	Doctor Zhivago	MGM	$43,000,000
3	Thunderball	United Artists / Eon	$27,000,000
4	Those Magnificent Men in their Flying Machines	20th Century Fox	$14,000,000
5	The Great Race	Warner Bros.	$11,400,000
6	That Darn Cat!	Buena Vista	$9,500,000
7	Cat Ballou	Columbia	$9,300,000
8	What's New Pussycat?	United Artists	$8,469,000
9	Shenandoah	Universal	$7,771,000
10	Von Ryan's Express	20th Century Fox	$7,700,000

== Events ==
- February 15 – George Stevens' production of The Greatest Story Ever Told, a retelling of the life of Jesus, premieres in New York City. It is such a flop with critics and audiences that its failure discourages production of religious epics for many years. It is considered notable in the 21st century for its astonishing landscapes, powerful and provocative cinematography, Max von Sydow's debut acting performance in an American film, and the final film performance of Claude Rains.
- March 2 – The Rodgers and Hammerstein film adaptation of The Sound of Music, directed by Robert Wise and starring Julie Andrews and Christopher Plummer, premieres. It quickly becomes a worldwide phenomenon and an instant classic. It successfully displaces Gone with the Wind to become, at the time, the highest-grossing film of all-time. The Sound of Music is credited as the film that saves and restores Twentieth Century-Fox from bankruptcy after it suffered from extremely high production costs of Cleopatra two years prior.
- July 1 – Blake Edwards's epic comedy The Great Race, starring Tony Curtis, Jack Lemmon, Natalie Wood, Peter Falk and Keenan Wynn, premieres. Initially a flop with critics and audiences, some do admire Edwards' direction, the acting by its ensemble cast, Henry Mancini's music, and its climactic pie fight.
- August 10 - A massive vault fire at MGM studios in Culver City, California, destroys the only known copies of hundreds of archived silent films, including Lon Chaney's London After Midnight and Greta Garbo's The Divine Woman.
- December 22 – David Lean's film adaptation of Boris Pasternak's Doctor Zhivago, starring Omar Sharif, Julie Christie, Rod Steiger and Alec Guinness, premieres and, like The Sound of Music, quickly becomes a worldwide phenomenon. Its moral story and message of a love and human spirit that defies the communist Soviet Union make the film a true classic with critics and audiences. It is included among top films by the American Film Institute. In a decade of very difficult times for its studio, Zhivago becomes the most successful and acclaimed Metro-Goldwyn-Mayer film since How the West Was Won (1962) and the greatest MGM film since Ben-Hur (1959).

== Awards ==
Academy Awards:

Best Picture: The Sound of Music – Argyle Enterprises, 20th Century Fox
Best Director: Robert Wise – The Sound of Music
Best Actor: Lee Marvin – Cat Ballou
Best Actress: Julie Christie – Darling
Best Supporting Actor: Martin Balsam – A Thousand Clowns
Best Supporting Actress: Shelley Winters – A Patch of Blue
Best Foreign Language Film: The Shop on Main Street (Obchod na korze), directed by Ján Kadár and Elmar Klos, Czechoslovakia

BAFTA Film Awards:

Best Film from Any Source: My Fair Lady
Best British Film: The Ipcress File

Golden Globe Awards:

Drama:
Best Picture: Doctor Zhivago
Best Actor: Omar Sharif – Doctor Zhivago
Best Actress: Samantha Eggar – The Collector

Comedy or Musical:
Best Picture: The Sound of Music
Best Actor: Lee Marvin – Cat Ballou
Best Actress: Julie Andrews – The Sound of Music

Other
Best Supporting Actor: Oskar Werner – The Spy Who Came in from the Cold
Best Supporting Actress: Ruth Gordon – Inside Daisy Clover
Best Director: David Lean – Doctor Zhivago

Palme d'Or (Cannes Film Festival):

The Knack ...and How to Get It, directed by Richard Lester, United Kingdom

Golden Lion (Venice Film Festival):

Vaghe stelle dell'Orsa (Sandra of a Thousand Delights), directed by Luchino Visconti, Italy

Golden Bear (Berlin Film Festival):

Alphaville, directed by Jean-Luc Godard, France / Italy

== 1965 film releases ==
United States unless stated

=== January–March ===
- January 1965
  - January 8
    - Dear Brigitte
  - January 15
    - Baby the Rain Must Fall
  - January 28
    - 36 Hours
- February 1965
  - February 10
    - Strange Bedfellows
    - Sylvia
  - February 15
    - Lord Jim UK)
  - February 23
    - Dr. Terror's House of Horrors UK)
  - February 24
    - Love Has Many Faces
    - Crack in the World
- March 1965
  - March 2
    - The Sound of Music
  - March 5
    - Face of the Screaming Werewolf
    - The Rounders
  - March 6
    - Empire
    - Nightmare in the Sun
  - March 15
    - Major Dundee
  - March 21
    - Die! Die! My Darling! (U.K.)
  - March 24
    - John Goldfarb, Please Come Home!
    - Bus Riley's Back in Town
  - March 31
    - The Truth About Spring

=== April–June ===
- April 1965
  - April 3
    - The Man from Button Willow
  - April 6
    - In Harm's Way
  - April 8
    - The World of Abbott and Costello
  - April 9
    - The Greatest Story Ever Told
  - April 14
    - Beach Blanket Bingo
    - The Satan Bug
    - Girl Happy
  - April 20
    - The Pawnbroker (U.S. release date)
- May 1965
  - 5 May
    - Alphaville (France)
    - Brainstorm
  - 7 May
    - Joy in the Morning
  - 13 May
    - The Yellow Rolls-Royce
  - 14 May
    - Harlow
  - 26 May
    - Mirage
- June 1965
  - June 2
    - What's New Pussycat?
  - June 3
    - Shenandoah
  - June 9
    - Up from the Beach French international co-production
  - June 16
    - Those Magnificent Men in Their Flying Machines
  - June 18
    - I'll Take Sweden
  - June 23
    - Genghis Khan (1965 film)
    - The Hallelujah Trail
    - Harlow
    - Von Ryan's Express
    - Willy McBean and his Magic Machine
  - June 24
    - Cat Ballou
  - June 30
    - Ski Party
    - Tickle Me

=== July–September ===
- July 1965
  - July 1
    - The Family Jewels
    - The Great Race
    - The Sons of Katie Elder
  - July 3
    - The Hill (UK)
  - July 12
    - The Art of Love
  - July 14
    - How to Stuff a Wild Bikini
  - July 21
    - I Saw What You Did
  - July 22
    - The Amorous Adventures of Moll Flanders
  - July 29
    - Ship of Fools
- August 1965
  - August 1
    - Voyage to the Prehistoric Planet
  - August 3
    - Darling (UK)
    - You Must Be Joking! (UK)
  - August 8
    - Frankenstein Conquers the World (Japan)
  - August 9
    - The Brigand of Kandahar
  - August 14
    - A Very Special Favor
  - August 18
    - Catch Us If You Can (UK)
    - The Monkey's Uncle
    - Sergeant Deadhead
  - August 23
    - Dr. Who and the Daleks (U.K.)
  - August 25
    - Morituri
    - That Funny Feeling
    - Wild on the Beach
- September 1965
  - September 1
    - Billie
  - September 3
    - The Battle of the Villa Fiorita (UK)
  - September 8
    - Operation C.I.A.
  - September 15
    - The Reward
  - September 20
    - How to Murder Your Wife
  - September 24
    - Marriage on the Rocks
  - September 27
    - Mickey One

=== October–December ===
- October 1965
  - October 6
    - Who Killed Teddy Bear
  - October 7
    - The Agony and the Ecstasy
  - October 11
    - The Bedford Incident (US/UK)
  - October 13
    - Situation Hopeless... But Not Serious
  - October 15
    - The Cincinnati Kid
  - October 17
    - Sting of Death
  - October 27
    - King Rat
- November 1965
  - November 4
    - Never Too Late
  - November 6
    - Dr. Goldfoot and the Bikini Machine
  - November 8
    - Rapture
  - November 15
    - Bunny Lake Is Missing (UK)
  - November 17
    - The War Lord
  - November 18
    - For a Few Dollars More (Italy)
  - November 19
    - Return from the Ashes
  - November 24
    - Harum Scarum
  - November 25
    - Lady L
  - November 26
    - Carry On Cowboy UK)
  - November 27
    - Gamera, the Giant Monster (Japan)
- December 1965
  - December 2
    - That Darn Cat!
  - December 8
    - The Return of Ringo (Italy)
  - December 10
    - A Patch of Blue
  - December 13
    - A Thousand Clowns
  - December 15
    - The Flight of the Phoenix
  - December 16
    - Battle of the Bulge
    - The Spy Who Came in from the Cold (UK)
  - December 19
    - Invasion of Astro-Monster
  - December 22
    - Doctor Zhivago (UK/Italy/US)
  - December 23
    - The Slender Thread
  - December 24
    - Bad Girls Go to Hell
  - December 29
    - Thunderball (UK/US)

== Notable films released in 1965 ==
United States unless stated

=== # ===
- The 10th Victim (La decima vittima), starring Marcello Mastroianni and Ursula Andress – (Italy/France)
- 36 Hours, starring James Garner, Rod Taylor and Eva Marie Saint
- The 317th Platoon (La 317ème section), written and directed by Pierre Schoendoerffer – (France)

=== A ===
- Abashiri Prison (Abashiri Bangaichi), starring Ken Takakura – (Japan)
- Adventures of a Dentist (Pokhozhdyeniya zubnovo vracha), directed by Elem Klimov – (U.S.S.R.)
- The Adventures of the Smurfs (Les aventures des Schtroumpfs) – (Belgium)
- The Agony and the Ecstasy, directed by Carol Reed, starring Charlton Heston and Rex Harrison
- The Alphabet Murders, directed by Frank Tashlin, starring Tony Randall and Anita Ekberg
- Alphaville (Alphaville, une étrange aventure de Lemmy Caution), directed by Jean-Luc Godard – (France)
- Always Further On (Tarahumara (Cada vez más lejos)), directed by Luis Alcoriza – (Mexico)
- The Amorous Adventures of Moll Flanders, starring Kim Novak, Richard Johnson and Angela Lansbury
- The Art of Love, directed by Norman Jewison, starring James Garner, Angie Dickinson, Elke Sommer and Dick Van Dyke
- Arzoo (Wish), starring Sadhana – (India)
- The Ashes (Popioły), directed by Andrzej Wajda – (Poland)

=== B ===
- Baby the Rain Must Fall, starring Steve McQueen and Lee Remick
- Bad Girls Go to Hell, directed by Doris Wishman
- Battle of the Bulge, starring Henry Fonda, Robert Shaw and Robert Ryan
- The Battle of the Villa Fiorita, directed by Delmer Daves, starring Maureen O'Hara, Rossano Brazzi, Olivia Hussey
- Beach Blanket Bingo, directed by William Asher, starring Annette Funicello, Frankie Avalon, Deborah Walley, Don Rickles
- The Bedford Incident, starring Richard Widmark and Sidney Poitier – (US/UK)
- Behind the Mask of Zorro, directed by Ricardo Blasco and starring Tony Russel – (Italy/Spain)
- Billie, directed by Don Weis and starring Patty Duke
- Black Humor, anthology film directed by Claude Autant-Lara, Giancarlo Zagni and José María Forqué – (France/Italy/Spain)
- Black Wind (Viento negro), directed by Servando González – (Mexico)
- Boeing Boeing, starring Jerry Lewis and Tony Curtis
- La Bohème, directed by Franco Zeffirelli – (West Germany)
- Le Bonheur, directed by Agnès Varda – (France)
- Brainstorm, directed by William Conrad, starring Anne Francis and Jeffrey Hunter
- The Brigand of Kandahar, starring Oliver Reed and Yvonne Romain
- Bunny Lake Is Missing, directed by Otto Preminger, starring Laurence Olivier and Carol Lynley – (U.K.)
- Bus Riley's Back in Town, starring Ann-Margret and Michael Parks

=== C ===
- The Camp Followers (Le soldatesse), starring Anna Karina – (Italy)
- Carry On Cowboy, starring Sid James, Kenneth Williams, Jim Dale – (U.K.)
- Casanova 70, starring Marcello Mastroianni and Virna Lisi – (Italy)
- Cat Ballou, starring Jane Fonda and Lee Marvin
- Catch Us If You Can (a.k.a. Having a Wild Weekend), starring the Dave Clark Five – (U.K.)
- China!, a documentary written by Felix Greene
- Chronicle of a Boy Alone (Crónica de un niño solo) – (Argentina)
- The Cincinnati Kid, directed by Norman Jewison, starring Steve McQueen, Edward G. Robinson, Ann-Margret, Karl Malden, Tuesday Weld, Joan Blondell
- City Under the Sea (a.k.a. War-Gods of the Deep), starring Vincent Price and Tab Hunter
- Clarence, the Cross-Eyed Lion, starring Marshall Thompson and Betsy Drake
- Cloportes (La aétamorphose des cloportes), directed by Pierre Granier-Deferre – (France/Italy)
- Coast of Skeletons, directed by Robert Lynn and starring Richard Todd and Dale Robertson – (U.K./South Africa)
- The Collector, directed by William Wyler, starring Terence Stamp and Samantha Eggar – (U.K./U.S.)
- Crack in the World, starring Dana Andrews, Kieron Moore, Janette Scott
- Cup Fever, starring Bernard Cribbins – (U.K.)
- Curse of the Fly, starring Brian Donlevy, George Baker, Carole Gray
- Curse of the Voodoo (a.k.a. Curse of Simba / Voodoo Blood Death), directed by Lindsay Shonteff – (U.K.)

=== D ===
- Darling, directed by John Schlesinger, starring Laurence Harvey, Dirk Bogarde, Julie Christie – (U.K.)
- Dear Brigitte, starring James Stewart, Bill Mumy, Glynis Johns, Ed Wynn, Brigitte Bardot
- The Decadent Influence (Une fille et des fusils, a.k.a. To Be a Crook), directed by Claude Lelouch – (France)
- A Devilish Homicide (Salinma) – (South Korea)
- Die! Die! My Darling! (a.k.a. Fanatic), starring Tallulah Bankhead and Stefanie Powers
- Dingaka, starring Stanley Baker – (South Africa)
- Do Not Disturb, starring Doris Day and Rod Taylor
- Doctor Zhivago, directed by David Lean, starring Omar Sharif, Julie Christie, Geraldine Chaplin, Rod Steiger, Alec Guinness—winner of 5 Academy Awards – (U.K.)
- The Dolls (Le bambole), starring Nino Manfredi, Monica Vitti, Elke Sommer and Gina Lollobrigida – (Italy)
- Dr. Goldfoot and the Bikini Machine, starring Vincent Price and Frankie Avalon
- Dr. Terror's House of Horrors, starring Peter Cushing and Christopher Lee – (U.K.)
- Dr. Who and the Daleks, starring Peter Cushing – (U.K.)

=== E ===
- The Early Bird, starring Norman Wisdom – (U.K.)
- The Eleanor Roosevelt Story, a documentary directed by Richard Kaplan
- Eric Soya's "17" (Sytten), starring Ole Søltoft and Ghita Nørby – (Denmark)
- Eternity in Flames – (China)

=== F ===
- The Face of Fu Manchu, directed by Don Sharp and starring Christopher Lee – (U.K./West Germany)
- The Family Jewels, starring Jerry Lewis
- Fantômas se déchaîne (Fantômas Unleashed), starring Jean Marais – (France)
- Faster, Pussycat! Kill! Kill!, directed by Russ Meyer
- Ferry Cross the Mersey, starring Gerry and the Pacemakers – (U.K.)
- Film, written by Samuel Beckett and directed by Alan Schneider
- Fists in the Pocket (I pugni in tasca) – (Italy)
- The Flight of the Phoenix, directed by Robert Aldrich, starring James Stewart, Richard Attenborough, Hardy Krüger, Ernest Borgnine, Peter Finch
- For a Few Dollars More, directed by Sergio Leone, starring Clint Eastwood – (Italy)
- Frankenstein Conquers the World (Furankenshutain tai Baragon), directed by Ishirō Honda – (Japan)
- Funny Things Happen Down Under, starring Olivia Newton-John – (Australia)

=== G ===
- Il Gaucho, starring Vittorio Gassman and Nino Manfredi – (Italy/Argentina)
- Gendarme in New York (Le gendarme à New York), starring Louis de Funès – (France/Italy/U.S.)
- Genghis Khan, starring Omar Sharif, Stephen Boyd and James Mason
- Girl Happy, starring Elvis Presley
- The Girls on the Beach, directed by William N. Witney, starring Noreen Corcoran and Martin West
- The Glory Guys, directed by Arnold Laven, starring Tom Tryon and Harve Presnell
- Goldstein, comedy ensemble film, with actors from The Second City, including Severn Darden
- The Great Race, directed by Blake Edwards, starring Tony Curtis, Jack Lemmon, Natalie Wood, Peter Falk, Ross Martin
- The Great Sioux Massacre, directed by Sidney Salkow and starring Joseph Cotten, Darren McGavin and Philip Carey
- The Greatest Story Ever Told, directed by George Stevens, starring Max von Sydow, Charlton Heston, Dorothy McGuire, David McCallum, Martin Landau, Telly Savalas
- Guide, directed by Vijay Anand, starring Dev Anand – (India)
- Gumnaam (Unknown), starring Manoj Kumar – (India)

=== H ===
- The Hallelujah Trail, directed by John Sturges, starring Burt Lancaster, Lee Remick, Jim Hutton, Pamela Tiffin
- Hands of a Gunfighter (Ocaso de un pistolero / Il destino di un pistolero), directed by Rafael Romero Marchent – (Italy/Spain)
- Happiness (Le bonheur), directed by Agnès Varda – (France)
- Harlow, starring Carroll Baker, Peter Lawford, Red Buttons, Mike Connors, Leslie Nielsen, Angela Lansbury
- Harlow, starring Carol Lynley, Efrem Zimbalist Jr., Barry Sullivan, Hurd Hatfield, Ginger Rogers
- Harum Scarum, aka Harem Holiday, starring Elvis Presley, Mary Ann Mobley, Fran Jeffries
- Harvey Middleman, Fireman, written and directed by Ernest Pintoff
- Help!, directed by Richard Lester, starring the Beatles – (U.K.)
- The Heroes of Telemark, starring Kirk Douglas and Richard Harris
- A High Wind in Jamaica, starring Anthony Quinn and James Coburn – (U.K.)
- The Hill, directed by Sidney Lumet, starring Sean Connery, Ian Bannen, Ossie Davis – (U.K.)
- The Hour and Turn of Augusto Matraga (A Hora e a Vez de Augusto Matraga) – (Brazil)
- How to Murder Your Wife, starring Jack Lemmon and Virna Lisi
- How to Stuff a Wild Bikini, starring Annette Funicello, Dwayne Hickman, Buster Keaton, Beverly Adams, Mickey Rooney

=== I ===
- I, a Woman (Jeg - en kvinde), directed by Mac Ahlberg – (Denmark/Sweden)
- I Knew Her Well (Io la conoscevo bene), starring Stefania Sandrelli, Nino Manfredi, Franco Nero – (Italy)
- I'll Take Sweden, starring Bob Hope, Dina Merrill, Frankie Avalon, Tuesday Weld
- Impossible on Saturday (Pas question le samedi) – (Italy/France/Israel)
- In Harm's Way, directed by Otto Preminger, starring John Wayne, Kirk Douglas, Patricia Neal, Brandon deWilde, Paula Prentiss, Henry Fonda
- Inside Daisy Clover, starring Natalie Wood, Robert Redford, Christopher Plummer
- Inside the Forbidden City (Song gong mi shi) – (Hong Kong)
- Intimate Lighting (Intimní osvětlení), directed by Ivan Passer – (Czechoslovakia)
- Invasion of Astro-Monster (Kaijû daisensô), directed by Ishirō Honda – (Japan)
- The Ipcress File, directed by Sidney J. Furie, starring Michael Caine – BAFTA Award for Best British Film – (U.K.)
- I Saw What You Did, starring Joan Crawford

=== J ===
- John Goldfarb, Please Come Home!, starring Shirley MacLaine, Richard Crenna, Peter Ustinov
- Joy in the Morning, starring Richard Chamberlain and Yvette Mimieux
- Juliet of the Spirits (Giulietta degli spiriti), directed by Federico Fellini – (Italy/France)

=== K ===
- King Rat, starring George Segal, Tom Courtenay and James Fox
- The Knack ...and How to Get It, directed by Richard Lester and starring Rita Tushingham – (U.K.)

=== L ===
- The Lace Wars (Les fêtes galantes), directed by René Clair – (France/Romania)
- Lady L, directed by Peter Ustinov, starring Sophia Loren, Paul Newman and David Niven
- Laurel and Hardy's Laughing 20's, a retrospective film directed by Robert Youngson
- Licensed to Kill, starring Tom Adams – (U.K.)
- Life at the Top, starring Laurence Harvey and Jean Simmons – (U.K.)
- The Liquidator, directed by Jack Cardiff, starring Rod Taylor and Trevor Howard (U.K.)
- La Loba (The She-Wolf) – (Mexico)
- Lord Jim, starring Peter O'Toole – (UK/US)
- Love and Kisses, starring Rick Nelson
- The Love Goddesses, a documentary directed by Saul J. Turell
- Love Has Many Faces, starring Lana Turner, Hugh O'Brian and Cliff Robertson
- Love Meetings, a documentary by Pier Paolo Pasolini – (Italy)
- The Loved One, directed by Tony Richardson, starring Robert Morse and Jonathan Winters
- Loves of a Blonde (Lásky jedné plavovlásky), directed by Miloš Forman – (Czechoslovakia)

=== M ===
- A Maiden for a Prince (Una vergine per il principe), starring Virna Lisi and Vittorio Gassman – (Italy)
- Major Dundee, directed by Sam Peckinpah, starring Charlton Heston, Richard Harris, James Coburn, Jim Hutton
- The Man from Button Willow
- Man Is Not a Bird (Čovek nije tica) – (Yugoslavia)
- Marco the Magnificent (La fabuleuse aventure de Marco Polo), directed by Denys de La Patellière and Noël Howard – (Multiple countries)
- Marriage on the Rocks, starring Frank Sinatra, Dean Martin and Deborah Kerr
- Marvelous Angelique (Merveilleuse Angélique), directed by Bernard Borderie – (France/Italy/West Germany)
- McHale's Navy Joins the Air Force
- Mickey One, directed by Arthur Penn, starring Warren Beatty
- Mirage, directed by Edward Dmytryk, starring Gregory Peck, Diane Baker and Walter Matthau
- Mister Moses, directed by Ronald Neame and starring Robert Mitchum and Carroll Baker
- The Moment of Truth (Il momento della verità), directed by Francesco Rosi – (Italy)
- The Money Trap, starring Glenn Ford, Rita Hayworth, Ricardo Montalbán, Joseph Cotten, Elke Sommer
- The Monkey's Uncle, starring Annette Funicello and Tommy Kirk
- Morituri, starring Marlon Brando and Yul Brynner
- Mozambique, directed by Robert Lynn – (U.K./West Germany)
- My Baby Is Black! (Les lâches vivent d'espoir), 1961 French film released in the U.S. in 1965 – (France)

=== N ===
- The Nanny, starring Bette Davis – (U.K.)
- The Naked Prey, directed by and starring Cornel Wilde – (U.S./South Africa)
- Never Too Late, starring Paul Ford, Maureen O'Sullivan, Connie Stevens, Jim Hutton
- Nightmare Castle, starring Barbara Steele – (Italy)
- Nightmare in the Sun, starring Ursula Andress, John Derek, Aldo Ray and Sammy Davis Jr.
- Ninety Degrees in the Shade (Třicet jedna ve stínu), directed by Jiří Weiss – (U.K./Czechoslovakia)
- None but the Brave, directed by and starring Frank Sinatra, with Clint Walker and Tommy Sands

=== O ===
- Once a Thief, starring Alain Delon and Ann-Margret – (United States/France)
- One Way Pendulum, directed by Peter Yates – (U.K.)
- Operation C.I.A., starring Burt Reynolds and Danielle Aubry
- Operation Crossbow, starring Sophia Loren – (U.K.)
- Operation Y and Shurik's Other Adventures (Operatsiya „Y“ i drugie priklyucheniya Shurika), starring Aleksandr Demyanenko – (U.S.S.R.)
- OSS 117–Mission for a Killer (Furia à Bahia pour OSS 117), directed by André Hunebelle and starring Frederick Stafford – (France)
- Othello, directed by Stuart Burge, starring Laurence Olivier, Maggie Smith, Frank Finlay – (U.K.)

=== P ===
- Pandora and the Magic Box, directed by Joseph W. Sarno
- Paris Secret, a documentary directed by Edouard Logereau
- A Patch of Blue, starring Sidney Poitier, Elizabeth Hartman, Shelley Winters
- Pierrot le Fou, directed by Jean-Luc Godard, starring Jean-Paul Belmondo and Anna Karina – (France)
- Pinocchio in Outer Space, produced and directed by Ray Goossens – (U.S./Belgium)
- A Pistol for Ringo (Una pistola per Ringo), directed by Duccio Tessari
- Planet of the Vampires (Terrore nello spazio), directed by Mario Bava – (Italy/Spain)
- The Possessed (La donna del lago), directed by Luigi Bazzoni and Franco Rossellini – (Italy)
- Promise Her Anything, directed by Arthur Hiller, starring Warren Beatty and Leslie Caron

=== R ===
- The Rabbit Is Me (Das Kaninchen bin ich) – (East Germany)
- A Rage to Live, directed by Walter Grauman and starring Suzanne Pleshette
- The Railroad Man (Il ferroviere), directed by Pietro Germi – (Italy)
- The Railrodder, a comedy short starring Buster Keaton in his last film – (Canada)
- Rapture (La fleur de l'âge), directed by John Guillermin, starring Melvyn Douglas, Patricia Gozzi and Dean Stockwell – (France/U.S.)
- Răscoala, directed by Mircea Mureșan – (Romania)
- Red Beard (Akahige), directed by Akira Kurosawa, starring Toshiro Mifune – (Japan)
- Red Line 7000, directed by Howard Hawks and starring James Caan
- Repulsion, directed by Roman Polanski, starring Catherine Deneuve – (U.K.)
- Return from the Ashes, starring Maximilian Schell and Samantha Eggar
- The Return of Mr. Moto, starring Henry Silva – (U.K.)
- The Return of Ringo (Il ritorno di Ringo), directed by Duccio Tessari
- Rotten to the Core, directed by John Boulting – (U.K.)
- The Rounders, directed by Burt Kennedy, starring Glenn Ford and Henry Fonda

=== S ===
- Samurai Spy (Ibun Sarutobi Sasuke) – (Japan)
- Sandra (Vaghe stelle dell'Orsa), directed by Luchino Visconti, starring Claudia Cardinale – (Italy)
- São Paulo, Sociedade Anônima (São Paulo, the Anonymous Town) – (Brazil)
- The Saragossa Manuscript (Rekopis znaleziony w Saragossie), starring Zbigniew Cybulski – (Poland)
- The Sandpiper, directed by Vincente Minnelli, starring Elizabeth Taylor, Richard Burton and Eva Marie Saint
- Sands of the Kalahari, starring Stuart Whitman, Stanley Baker, Susannah York – (U.K.)
- The Satan Bug, starring George Maharis and Anne Francis
- Secrets Behind the Wall (Kabe no naka no himegoto) – (Japan)
- Sergeant Deadhead, starring Frankie Avalon and Deborah Walley
- Shadows of Forgotten Ancestors (Tini zabutykh predkiv) – (U.S.S.R.)
- Shakespeare Wallah, directed by James Ivory, starring Shashi Kapoor, Felicity Kendal, Madhur Jaffrey
- The Shameless Old Lady (La vieille dame indigne), directed by René Allio – (France)
- She, starring Ursula Andress and Peter Cushing – (U.K.)
- Shenandoah, starring James Stewart, Doug McClure, Rosemary Forsyth, Katharine Ross
- Ship of Fools, directed by Stanley Kramer, starring Vivien Leigh, Simone Signoret, Lee Marvin, Michael Dunn, José Ferrer
- The Shop on Main Street (Obchod na korze), directed by Ján Kadár and Elmar Klos (Czechoslovakia)
- Simon of the Desert (Simón del desierto), directed by Luis Buñuel – (Mexico)
- The Sin (Al Haram) – (Egypt)
- Situation Hopeless... But Not Serious, starring Alec Guinness, Mike Connors, Robert Redford
- Ski Party, starring Frankie Avalon and Yvonne Craig
- The Skull, starring Peter Cushing, Christopher Lee, Patrick Wymark – (U.K.)
- Slalom, starring Vittorio Gassman, Adolfo Celi, Beba Lončar, Daniela Bianchi – (Italy)
- The Sleeping Car Murders (Compartiment tueurs), directed by Costa-Gavras, starring Yves Montand and Simone Signoret – (France)
- The Slender Thread, directed by Sydney Pollack, starring Sidney Poitier, Anne Bancroft, Telly Savalas and Ed Asner
- The Sons of Katie Elder, directed by Henry Hathaway, starring John Wayne and Dean Martin
- The Sound of Music, directed by Robert Wise, starring Julie Andrews and Christopher Plummer
- The Spy Who Came in from the Cold, directed by Martin Ritt, starring Richard Burton and Claire Bloom – (U.K.)
- Sting of Death, directed by William Grefe
- Story of a Prostitute (Shunpuden), directed by Seijun Suzuki – (Japan)
- Strange Bedfellows, starring Rock Hudson and Gina Lollobrigida
- A Study in Terror (British), a Sherlock Holmes mystery directed by James Hill, starring John Neville as Holmes, Donald Houston as Watson, and Anthony Quayle- (U.K.)
- A Swingin' Summer, starring James Stacy and Raquel Welch
- Sword of the Beast (Kedamono no ken), directed by Hideo Gosha – (Japan)
- Sylvia, starring Carroll Baker and George Maharis
- Synanon, directed by Richard Quine, starring Edmond O'Brien, Chuck Connors, Stella Stevens

=== T ===
- Tattooed Life (Irezumi ichidai), directed by Seijun Suzuki – (Japan)
- Ten Little Indians, starring Shirley Eaton, Hugh O'Brian, Daliah Lavi, Stanley Holloway, Wilfred Hyde-White, Fabian Forte – (U.K.)
- That Darn Cat! starring Dean Jones
- That Funny Feeling, starring Bobby Darin and Sandra Dee
- That Man in Istanbul, directed by Antonio Isasi-Isasmendi and starring Horst Buchholz – (France/Italy/Spain)
- The Third Day, starring George Peppard and Elizabeth Ashley
- Thirty Three (Tridtsat tri) – (U.S.S.R.)
- Those Magnificent Men in Their Flying Machines, directed by Ken Annakin, starring Stuart Whitman, Sarah Miles, Robert Morley, Gert Fröbe – (U.K.)
- A Thousand Clowns, starring Jason Robards, Barry Gordon, Martin Balsam, Barbara Harris
- Thunderball, starring Sean Connery (as James Bond), with Claudine Auger, Luciana Paluzzi, Adolfo Celi – (U.K.)
- Tickle Me, starring Elvis Presley
- Tokyo Olympiad, a documentary directed by Kon Ichikawa – (Japan)
- Town Tamer, directed by Lesley Selander and starring Dana Andrews
- The Truth About Spring, directed by Richard Thorpe, starring Hayley Mills and John Mills
- Two on a Guillotine, directed by William Conrad and starring Connie Stevens

=== U ===
- The Uninhibited (Los pianos mecánicos), directed by Juan Antonio Bardem, starring Melina Mercouri and James Mason – (Spain)
- Up from the Beach, starring Cliff Robertson
- Up to His Ears (Les tribulations d'un chinois en chine), starring Jean Paul Belmondo and Ursula Andress – (France)

=== V ===
- A Very Special Favor, starring Rock Hudson and Leslie Caron
- Victim Five, directed by Robert Lynn – (U.K.)
- Viva Maria!, directed by Louis Malle, starring Brigitte Bardot and Jeanne Moreau – (France)
- Von Ryan's Express, directed by Mark Robson, starring Frank Sinatra, Trevor Howard, Edward Mulhare, Adolfo Celi
- Voyage to the Prehistoric Planet, starring Basil Rathbone

=== W ===
- Waqt, starring Sunil Dutt and Sadhana – (India)
- The War Game, a TV docudrama directed by Peter Watkins – (U.K.)
- The War Lord, starring Charlton Heston, Richard Boone, Rosemary Forsyth
- What's New Pussycat?, directed by Clive Donner, starring Peter Sellers, Peter O'Toole, Woody Allen, Romy Schneider, Paula Prentiss, Capucine
- Who Killed Teddy Bear, starring Sal Mineo, Juliet Prowse and Elaine Stritch
- Wild on the Beach, starring Sherry Jackson, Frankie Randall, Sonny & Cher
- Willy McBean and His Magic Machine, stop-motion film produced by Arthur Rankin Jr. and Videocraft International
- Winter Kept Us Warm, directed by David Secter – (Canada)
- The World of Abbott and Costello, starring Bud Abbott and Lou Costello

=== Y ===
- Yo Yo, directed by and starring Pierre Étaix – (France)
- You Must Be Joking!, starring Lionel Jeffries, Denholm Elliott, Michael Callan – (U.K.)
- Young Cassidy, directed by Jack Cardiff and John Ford – (U.K.)
- Young Dillinger, starring Nick Adams and Mary Ann Mobley

=== Z ===
- Zatoichi and the Chess Expert (Zatōichi jigoku-tabi), directed by Kenji Misumi – (Japan)
- Zatoichi and the Doomed Man (Zatōichi sakate-giri), directed by Kazuo Mori – (Japan)

== Short film series ==
- Looney Tunes (1930–1969)
- Merrie Melodies (1931–1969)
- Speedy Gonzales (1953–1968)
- Goofy (1965)

== Births ==
- January 1 - Dan Yeager, American actor, writer, producer and director
- January 3
  - Jens Albinus, Danish actor
  - Peter Landesman, American screenwriter, director and producer
- January 4
  - Yvan Attal, French actor, scriptwriter and director
  - Julia Ormond, English actress
- January 5 - Vinnie Jones, British actor, producer and singer
- January 8
  - Silas Carson, English actor
  - Michelle Forbes, American actress
- January 9 – Joely Richardson, English actress
- January 10 – Butch Hartman, American animator, writer, producer and director
- January 12
  - Bill Bailey, English comedian, actor and television presenter
  - Ali Wentworth, American actress, comedian and producer
  - Rob Zombie, American singer-songwriter, filmmaker and actor
- January 15 – James Nesbitt, Northern Irish actor
- January 22
  - Diane Lane, American actress
  - Brian McCardie, Scottish actor and writer (d. 2024)
  - Chintara Sukapatana, Thai actress
- January 24 - Carlos Saldanha, Brazilian animator, director, producer and voice actor
- January 27 – Alan Cumming, Scottish actor
- January 28 - Lynda Boyd, Canadian actress, singer, musician and writer
- January 31 - Matt McColm, American actor and stuntman
- February 1
  - Brandon Lee, American actor (d. 1993)
  - Sherilyn Fenn, American actress
- February 3 – Maura Tierney, American actress
- February 5 - Jordi Caballero, Spanish actor, writer and producer
- February 7
  - Chris Rock, American actor and comedian
  - Jason Gedrick, American actor
- February 9
  - Darren Dalton, American actor, screenwriter and producer
  - Keith Wickham, British voice actor, comedian and screenwriter
- February 12 - Christine Elise, American actress
- February 13 - Andy Buckley, American actor
- February 15 - Claire Yarlett, English-born American actress
- February 17 - Michael Bay, American director and producer
- February 18 – Dr. Dre, American music producer
- February 20
  - Ron Eldard, American actor
  - Jim Zulevic, American actor, comedian, writer and radio host (d. 2006)
- February 23 – Kristin Davis, American actress
- February 24 - Mark Moses, American actor
- February 25 - Carrot Top, American stand-up comedian and actor
- February 27 - Noah Emmerich, American actor and director
- March 3 - Ian Beattie, Northern Irish actor
- March 4
  - Stacy Edwards, American actress
  - Paul W.S. Anderson, English filmmaker
- March 9
  - Mike Pollock, American voice actor and former radio personality
  - Coolie Ranx, British-Jamaican actor and singer
- March 11 - Wallace Langham, American actor
- March 13 - Steve Bacic, Canadian actor
- March 14
  - Aamir Khan, Indian actor
  - Kevin Williamson, American screenwriter, director and producer
- March 15 - Robyn Malcolm, New Zealand actress
- March 18
  - David Cubitt, English-born Canadian actor
  - Yul Vazquez, Cuban-American actor and musician
- March 19
  - Lisa Stahl, American actress and game show host
  - Fred Stoller, American actor and stand-up comedian
- March 21 - Cynthia Geary, American actress
- March 22 - Steve Toussaint, British actor and writer
- March 23
  - Peter Jacobson, American actor
  - Wayne Péré, American character actor
- March 25 – Sarah Jessica Parker, American actress
- March 31
  - Steve Bing, American businessman, philanthropist and film producer (d. 2020)
  - William McNamara, American actor
- April 1
  - Jane Adams, American actress and screenwriter
  - Robert Lorenz, American producer and director
  - José Zúñiga, Honduran-American actor
- April 3 - Angela Featherstone, actress and writer
- April 4 – Robert Downey Jr., American actor
- April 7
  - Bill Bellamy, American actor and stand-up comedian
  - Steve Carr, American director and producer
  - Ellie Harvie, Canadian actress
- April 9 - Mark Pellegrino, American actor
- April 11 - Lynn Ferguson, Scottish writer and actress
- April 12 - Kim Bodnia, Danish actor
- April 14 - Tom Dey, American director, screenwriter and producer
- April 16
  - Jon Cryer, American actor
  - Martin Lawrence, American actor and comedian
- April 17
  - William Mapother, American actor
  - Catherine Russell, British actress
- April 22 - Roman Coppola, American filmmaker, screenwriter, producer
- April 25
  - John Henson, American puppeteer (d. 2014)
  - Corrado Invernizzi, Italian actor
- April 26 – Kevin James, American actor and comedian
- April 27 - Anna Chancellor, English actress
- April 30 - Adrian Pasdar, American actor and voice artist
- May 2 - Ari Lehman, American actor
- May 3 - Rob Brydon, Welsh actor, comedian, presenter, singer and writer
- May 6 - Leslie Hope, Canadian actress and director
- May 10 - Kiyoyuki Yanada, Japanese voice actor (d. 2022)
- May 12 - Anthony Brandon Wong, Australian actor
- May 13 - Lari White, American singer-songwriter and actress (d. 2018)
- May 16 - Vincent Regan, British actor
- May 19
  - Maile Flanagan, American actress and comedian
  - Mikhail Gorevoy, Russian actor
- May 23 – Liina Tennosaar, Estonian actress
- May 24
  - John C. Reilly, American actor and comedian
  - Peter Tuiasosopo, American actor
- May 27 – Zenobia Shroff, Indian-American actress and comedienne
- May 28 - Alon Abutbul, Israeli actor (d. 2025)
- May 29 - Matthew Porretta, American actor
- May 30 - Antoine Fuqua, American director
- May 31
  - Jeremy Hotz, Canadian-American actor and stand-up comedian
  - Brooke Shields, American actress and model
- June 1 - Andrew Havill, English actor
- June 8
  - Frank Grillo, American actor
  - Jefferson Mays, American actor
- June 10 – Elizabeth Hurley, English model and actress
- June 18 – Kim Dickens, American actress
- June 19
  - Andrew Lauer, American filmmaker and actor
  - Sean Marshall, American child actor and singer
- June 22 - J. J. Cohen, American actor
- June 24 - Richard Lumsden, English actor, writer, composer and musician
- June 25 - Tricia Cooke, American editor, screenwriter and producer
- June 28
  - Jessica Hecht, American actress
  - Sonny Strait, American voice actor
- July 1
  - Tom Hodges, American actor and producer
  - Harald Zwart, Dutch-Norwegian director
- July 3
  - Tommy Flanagan, Scottish actor
  - Connie Nielsen, Danish actress
- July 4
  - Gérard Watkins, English-French actor, playwright, director and screenwriter
  - Tracy Letts, American actor, playwright and screenwriter
- July 7 - Mo Collins, American actress and comedian
- July 8
  - Corey Parker, American actor and acting coach (d. 2026)
  - Lee Tergesen, American actor
- July 9
  - K. Todd Freeman, American actor
  - David O'Hara, Scottish character actor
- July 11
  - Liane Curtis, American actress and musician
  - Dina Eastwood, American reporter and former actress
  - Pamela Gidley, American actress and model (d. 2018)
- July 14 - Bibo Bergeron, French animator and director
- July 16 - Daryl Mitchell, American actor and rapper
- July 17
  - Santiago Segura, Spanish filmmaker and actor
  - Alex Winter, British-born American director, writer and actor
- July 22 - Patrick Labyorteaux, American actor
- July 23 - Allison Abbate, American producer and animator
- July 24
  - Paul Ben-Victor, American character actor
  - Kadeem Hardison, American actor
  - Doug Liman, American director and producer
- July 25 – Illeana Douglas, American actress
- July 26 – Jeremy Piven, American actor
- July 28 - James Biberi, Albanian-American actor
- July 29 - Ian Roberts, American actor, comedian and writer
- August 1
  - Caprice Benedetti, American actress
  - Sam Mendes, British director, producer and screenwriter
- August 4 - James Tupper, Canadian actor
- August 5
  - Olivier Megaton, French director, writer and editor
  - Scott William Winters, American actor
- August 6
  - Jeremy Ratchford, Canadian actor
  - De'voreaux White, American actor
- August 10 - Claudia Christian, American actress and singer
- August 11
  - Embeth Davidtz, American-South African actress
  - Viola Davis, American actress
  - Duane Martin, American actor
- August 12 - Peter Krause, American actor, director and producer
- August 16 - Brian McCann, American actor, comedian and writer
- August 18
  - Jørgen Langhelle, Norwegian actor (d. 2021)
  - Ikue Ōtani, Japanese actress, singer, voice actress and narrator
- August 19
  - Maria de Medeiros, Portuguese actress, director and singer
  - Kevin Dillon, American actor
  - Kyra Sedgwick, American actress
- August 22
  - Courtney Gains, American actor
  - Valery Nikolaev, Soviet-Russian actor and director
- August 24 – Marlee Matlin, American actress
- August 25 - Kim Kold, Danish actor
- August 29
  - Frances Ruffelle, English actress and singer
  - Dina Spybey, American actress
- August 31
  - Daniel Bernhardt, Swiss actor, model and martial artist
  - Jaime P. Gomez, American actor
- September 3
  - Charlie Sheen, American actor
  - Costas Mandylor, Australian actor
- September 4 - Michael Bentt, British-born American actor
- September 6 - John Polson, Australian actor and director
- September 9
  - Charles Esten, American actor, musician and comedian
  - Constance Marie, American actress
- September 13 - Jeff Ross, American stand-up comedian and actor
- September 15
  - Fernanda Torres, Brazilian actress and writer
  - Joe Chrest, American academic and actor
- September 17
  - Bryan Singer, American director, producer and screenwriter
  - Kyle Chandler, American actor
- September 19 - Cheri Oteri, American actress and comedian
- September 21
  - Cheryl Hines, American actress, comedian and director
  - David Wenham, Australian actor
- September 22 - Dan Bucatinsky, American actor, writer and producer
- September 25 - Gordon Currie, Canadian-American actor
- September 27 - Maria Schrader, German actress, screenwriter and director
- September 28 - Christopher Evan Welch, American actor (d. 2013)
- September 30 - Omid Djalili, British stand-up comedian, actor and writer of Iranian descent
- October 1 - Cindy Margolis, American actress and model
- October 8
  - Peter Greene, American actor (d. 2025)
  - Igor Jijikine, Russian-American actor
  - Burr Steers, American actor, screenwriter and director
- October 10
  - Joe Dixon, English actor
  - Chris Penn, American actor (d. 2006)
  - Rebecca Pidgeon, American actress, singer and songwriter
- October 11
  - Lennie James, English actor
  - Ivo Uukkivi, Estonian actor, singer and television producer
  - Sean Patrick Flanery, American actor, author and martial artist
- October 14 – Steve Coogan, English actor
- October 18 - Ralph Eggleston, American animator, art director, storyboard artist, writer, director and production designer (d. 2022)
- October 19 – Merle Jääger, Estonian actress and poet
- October 20 – William Zabka, American actor
- October 22 - Valeria Golino, Italian actress and film director
- October 25 – Mathieu Amalric, French actor and filmmaker
- October 26 - Kelly Rowan, retired Canadian actress
- October 27 - Mohan Kapur, Indian actor and television host
- October 28 - Jami Gertz, American actress
- October 31 - Rob Rackstraw, British voice actor
- November 1 - Ilia Volok, Ukrainian actor
- November 2 – Shah Rukh Khan, Indian actor
- November 4 - Kiersten Warren, American actress
- November 7 - Mike Henry, American actor, comedian, writer and producer
- November 13 - Tommie Earl Jenkins, American actor and musician
- November 19 - Paul Weitz, American filmmaker and actor
- November 21
  - Björk, Icelandic singer-songwriter and actress
  - Alexander Siddig, Sudanese-English actor
- November 22
  - Sam Fell, British animator, director, screenwriter and voice actor
  - Mads Mikkelsen, Danish actor
  - Kathrine Narducci, American actress
- November 23 - Don Frye, American actor
- November 24 – Shirley Henderson, Scottish actress
- November 25 - Dougray Scott, Scottish actor
- November 26 - Scott Adsit, American actor, comedian and writer
- November 28 - Anastasia Hille, English actress
- November 29
  - Ellen Cleghorne, American actress and comedian
  - Peter Spears, American actor and filmmaker
- November 30
  - Marcus Raboy, American director
  - Ben Stiller, American actor, comedian and filmmaker
  - Andrew Tiernan, British actor and director
- December 2 - Beatrice Macola, Italian actress (d. 2001)
- December 3
  - Barbara Garrick, American actress
  - Steve Harris, American actor
  - Andrew Stanton, American animator, director, screenwriter, producer and voice actor
- December 7 – Jeffrey Wright, American actor
- December 8
  - Ned Dennehy, Irish actor
  - David Harewood, British actor
- December 9 - Margaret Riley, producer (d. 2024)
- December 14 - Ted Raimi, American character actor, director, comedian and writer
- December 15 - Anjul Nigam, Indian-born American actor, producer and writer
- December 16 – J.B. Smoove, American actor and comedian
- December 19 - Jessica Steen, Canadian actress
- December 21
  - Andy Dick, American comedian, actor, musician and television and film producer
  - Declan O'Brien, American writer and director (d. 2022)
- December 22
  - David S. Goyer, American filmmaker
  - Jonathan Joss, American actor (d. 2025)
  - Sergi López, Spanish actor
- December 27 – Salman Khan, Indian actor
- December 31 – Gong Li, Chinese actress

== Deaths ==
- January 14 – Jeanette MacDonald, 61, American actress, singer, San Francisco, One Hour with You
- February 5 – Irving Bacon, 71, American actor, Meet John Doe, Fort Ti
- February 10 – Arnold Manoff, 50, American screenwriter, No Minor Vices, Casbah
- February 15 – Nat King Cole, 45, American singer and actor, St. Louis Blues, Istanbul
- February 20 – Michał Waszyński, 60, Polish director and producer, Prokurator Alicja Horn, Będzie lepiej
- February 23 – Stan Laurel, 74, British actor, The Flying Deuces, Sons of the Desert
- March 1 – Fred Immler, 84, German actor, Madame Dubarry, Zapata's Gang
- March 6 – Margaret Dumont, 82, American actress, Duck Soup, A Night at the Opera
- March 8 – Esther Howard, 72, American actress, The Big Noise, Detour
- March 23 – Mae Murray, 79, American actress, The Merry Widow, The Delicious Little Devil
- March 28
  - Clemence Dane, 77, British screenwriter, Anna Karenina, Perfect Strangers
  - Jack Hoxie, 80, American Western actor, The Last Frontier, Gold
- April 1 – Edna Tichenor, 64, American actress, London After Midnight, The Show
- April 3 – Ray Enright, 69, American director, Alibi Ike, The Spoilers
- April 8 – Lars Hanson, 78, Swedish actor, The Wind, Flesh and the Devil
- April 10 – Linda Darnell, 41, American actress, My Darling Clementine, The Mark of Zorro
- April 24 – Louise Dresser, 85, American actress, A Ship Comes In, The Scarlet Empress
- April 30 – Helen Chandler, 59, American actress, Dracula, The Last Flight
- 5 May – John Waters, 71, screenwriter and director, The Big Country, The Desperate Hours
- June 6 – Lech Owron, 71, Polish actor, Vampires of Warsaw, The Little Eagle
- June 7 – Judy Holliday, 43, American actress, Born Yesterday, Bells Are Ringing
- June 8 – Florence Ryerson, 72, American screenwriter, The Wizard of Oz, The Ice Follies of 1939
- June 15 – Steve Cochran, 48, American actor, The Best Years of Our Lives, White Heat
- June 22 – David O. Selznick, 63, American producer, Gone with the Wind, Rebecca
- June 23 – Mary Boland, 85, American stage and film actress, The Women, Ruggles of Red Gap
- June 27 – Anthony Veiller, 62, American screenwriter, The Stranger, The Killers
- July 11 – Ray Collins, 78, American actor, Citizen Kane, The Kid from Left Field
- July 19 – Clyde Beatty, 62, American actor and animal trainer, Africa Screams, Ring of Fear
- July 24 – Constance Bennett, 60, American actress, Topper, Merrily We Live
- July 28 – Minor Watson, 75, American actor, Woman of the Year, The Jackie Robinson Story
- August 6
  - Nancy Carroll, 61, American actress, The Devil's Holiday, Hot Saturday
  - Everett Sloane, 55, American actor, Citizen Kane, The Lady from Shanghai (suicide)
- August 30 – Pauline Garon, 64, Canadian actress, The Heart of Broadway, The College Hero
- September 2 – Felix E. Feist, 55, American director, This Woman Is Dangerous, The Big Trees
- September 7
  - Catherine Dale Owen, 70, American actress, Such Men Are Dangerous, Born Reckless
  - Jean Peyrière, 79, French actor, Le roi de Paris, Fanfan la Tulipe
- September 8 – Dorothy Dandridge, 42, American actress, singer, Carmen Jones, Porgy and Bess
- September 27 – Clara Bow, 60, American actress, Wings, It
- September 29 – Eddie Gribbon, 75, American film actor, brother of Harry Gribbon
- October 3 – Zachary Scott, 51, American actor, Mildred Pierce, The Southerner
- October 6 – Tom Kennedy, 80, American actor, Petticoat Larceny, Bringing Up Father
- October 18 – Henry Travers, 91, British actor, It's a Wonderful Life, Shadow of a Doubt
- October 21 – Marie McDonald, 42, American actress, The Geisha Boy, Living in a Big Way
- October 23 – Janice Logan, 50, American actress, Dr. Cyclops, Opened by Mistake
- October 31 – Rita Johnson, 52, American actress, Here Comes Mr. Jordan, The Major and the Minor
- November 14 – Russell Collins, 68, American actor, Miss Sadie Thompson, Bad Day at Black Rock
- November 26 – Wild Bill Elliott, 61, American actor, The San Antonio Kid, Sudden Danger
- December 5 – Joseph I. Breen, 77, chief administrator of the Motion Picture Production Code of 1930 (Hays Code) from 1934 to 1954
- December 22 – Albert Ritz, 64, American entertainer of the Ritz Brothers, Sing, Baby, Sing, Life Begins in College
- December 29 – Frank S. Nugent, 57, American screenwriter, The Searchers, She Wore a Yellow Ribbon

== Film debuts ==
- Ian Abercrombie – Von Ryan's Express
- Woody Allen – What's New Pussycat
- Lewis Arquette – The Very Naked Canvas
- Paul Benedict – The Double-Barrelled Detective Story
- Jane Birkin – The Knack ...and How to Get It
- Jacqueline Bisset – The Knack ...and How to Get It
- Cher - Wild on the Beach
- Dabney Coleman – The Slender Thread
- James Cossins – Darling
- Robert De Niro – Three Rooms in Manhattan
- Silvia Dionisio – Darling
- Vernon Dobtcheff – Those Magnificent Men in Their Flying Machines
- Robert DoQui – Taffy and the Jungle Hunter
- Agneta Ekmanner – Love 65
- Michael Gambon – Othello
- Giancarlo Giannini – Libido
- Teresa Gimpera – Fata Morgana
- Uschi Glas – The Sinister Monk
- Olivia Hussey – The Battle of the Villa Fiorita
- Timothy Hutton – Never Too Late
- Derek Jacobi – Othello
- James Karen – Frankenstein Meets the Space Monster
- Stuart Lancaster – Mudhoney
- Tony Lo Bianco – The Sex Perils of Paulette
- Deanna Lund – Once Upon a Coffee House
- Nicoletta Machiavelli – Thrilling
- Ana Martín – El gángster
- Michael Parks – Bus Riley's Back in Town
- Janine Reynaud – Six Days a Week
- Alex Rocco – Motorpsycho
- Katharine Ross – Shenandoah
- Fran Ryan – Mickey One
- José Sacristán – La familia y... uno más
- Andrzej Seweryn – Beata
- Abe Vigoda – Three Rooms in Manhattan
- José Wilker – A Falecida
- Paul Williams – The Loved One
