= List of French films of 1965 =

A list of films produced in France in 1965.

== Films ==
Title	Director	Cast	Genre	Notes
The 10th Victim	Elio Petri	Marcello Mastroianni, Ursula Andress, Elsa Martinelli	Science fiction	Italian-French co-production
The 317th Platoon	Pierre Schoendoerffer	Jacques Perrin, Bruno Cremer, Pierre Fabre	War	
Alphaville	Jean-Luc Godard	Eddie Constantine, Anna Karina, Akim Tamiroff	Science fiction	French-Italian co-production
Angelique and the King	Bernard Borderie	Michèle Mercier, Robert Hossein, Jacques Toja	Adventure	French-Italian co-production
Le Bonheur	Agnès Varda	Jean-Claude Drouot, Claire Drouot, Marie-France Boyer	Drama	
The Buddies	Yves Robert	Philippe Noiret, Pierre Mondy, Claude Rich, Michael Lonsdale, Christian Marin, Jacques Balutin, Guy Bedos	Comedy	
Casanova 70	Mario Monicelli	Mario Monicelli, Michèle Mercier, Virna Lisi	Comedy	Italian-French co-production
Ces dames s'en mêlent	Raoul André	Eddie Constantine	Spy	French-Italian co-production
Circus Angel	Albert Lamorisse	Philippe Avron, Mireille Negre, Henri Lambert	Fantasy	
Code Name: Jaguar	Maurice Labro	Ray Danton, Roger Hanin, Pascale Petit	Eurospy	French-Spanish-West German co-production
The Duke's Gold	Jacques Baratier	Claude Rich, Elsa Martinelli, Danielle Darrieux	Comedy	Co-production with Italy
The False Step	Antoine d'Ormesson	Dominique Paturel, Yori Bertin	Drama thriller	
Fantômas se déchaîne	André Hunebelle	Jean Marais, Louis de Funès, Mylène Demongeot	Comedy, crime	
Le gendarme à New York	Jean Girault	Louis de Funès, Michel Galabru, Jean Lefebvre	Comedy	French-Italian co-production
The Glass Cage	Philippe Arthuys	Françoise Prevost, Jean Négroni, Georges Rivière	Drama	French-Israeli co-production
God's Thunder	Denys de La Patellière	Jean Gabin, Michèle Mercier	Comedy drama	French-Italian-West German co-production
Heaven on One's Head	Yves Ciampi	Andre Smagghe, Folco Jacques Monod, Bernard Fresson	Science fiction	French-Italian co-production
The Hour of Truth	Henri Calef	Karlheinz Böhm, Brett Halsey, Corinne Marchand	Drama	Co-production with Israel
The Inspector Leads the Investigation	Fabien Collin, Jacques Delile	Dany Carrel, Pascale Roberts, Lucile Saint-Simon, Claude Cerval, Jacques Dacqmine, Daniel Emilfork, Paul Frankeur, Henri-Jacques Huet, Christian Marin, Georges Rivière, Mario David, Robert Hossein	Drama thriller	
Juliet of the Spirits	Federico Fellini	Giulietta Masina, Mario Pisu, Sandra Milo	Comedy-drama	Italian-French co-production
The Lace Wars	Rene Clair	Jean-Pierre Cassel, Marie Dubois	Comedy	French-Romanian co-production
The Majordomo	Jean Delannoy	Paul Meurisse, Geneviève Page, Paul Hubschmid	Comedy	Co-production with Italy
The Man from Cocody	Christian-Jaque	Jean Marais, Liselotte Pulver, Philippe Clay	Adventure	Co-production with Italy
Marvelous Angelique	Bernard Borderie	Michèle Mercier, Jean Rochefort, Claude Giraud	Adventure	French-Italian-West German co-production
La Métamorphose des cloportes	Pierre Granier-Deferre	Lino Ventura, Charles Aznavour, Irina Demick	Crime	French-Italian co-production
Un milliard dans un billard	Nicolas Gessner	Claude Rich, Jean Seberg, Elsa Martinelli	Comedy	
Nick Carter and Red Club	Jean-Paul Savignac	Eddie Constantine, Nicole Courcel, Joe Dassin, Jeanne Valérie	Spy	French-Italian co-production
No Caviar for Aunt Olga	Jean Becker	Pierre Brasseur, Sophie Daumier, Pierre Vernier, Francis Blanche	Comedy	
OSS 117 Mission for a Killer	André Hunebelle	Frederick Stafford, Mylène Demongeot, Raymond Pellegrin	Spy	French-Italian co-production
Our Agent Tiger	Claude Chabrol	Roger Hanin, Roger Dumas, Michel Bouquet	Spy	French-Italian-Spanish co-production
Passeport diplomatique agent K 8	Robert Vernay	Roger Hanin, Christiane Minazzoli, Lucien Nat	Spy film	French-Italian co-production
Pierrot le fou	Jean-Luc Godard	Jean-Paul Belmondo, Anna Karina, Dirk Sanders	Avant-garde	French-Italian co-production
The Shameless Old Lady	René Allio	Sylvie, Malka Ribowska, Étienne Bierry, Victor Lanoux	Comedy drama	
The Sleeping Car Murders	Costa Gavras	Yves Montand, Jean-Louis Trintignant, Pierre Mondy	Mystery, thriller	
The Sucker	Gérard Oury	Funès, Bourvil, Beba Lončar	Comedy	French-Italian co-production
Tell Me Whom to Kill	Étienne Périer	Michèle Morgan, Paul Hubschmid	Drama, mystery, thriller	
Three Rooms in Manhattan	Marcel Carné	Maurice Ronet, Annie Girardot, Gabriele Ferzetti	Drama	French-Italian co-production
The Two Orphans	Riccardo Freda	Mike Marshall, Valeria Ciangottini, Sophie Darès	Drama historical	French-Italian co-production
Under Your Hat	Jacques Poitrenaud	Michel Serrault, Jean Poiret, Sophie Desmarets, Jean Richard, Francis Blanche	Comedy crime	French-Spanish co-production
Up to His Ears	Philippe de Broca	Jean-Paul Belmondo, Ursula Andress, Jean Rochefort	Adventure	French-Italian co-production
Viva Maria!	Louis Malle	Brigitte Bardot, Jeanne Moreau, George Hamilton	Adventure, comedy	French-Italian co-production
When the Pheasants Pass	Édouard Molinaro	Paul Meurisse, Bernard Blier, Jean Lefebvre	Comedy	
A Woman in White	Claude Autant-Lara	Marie-José Nat, Jean Valmont, Claude Gensac	Drama	French-Italian co-production
Yo Yo	Pierre Étaix	Pierre Étaix, Claudine Auger	Comedy	

== See also ==
- 1965 in France
