= The World of Abbott and Costello =

1965 compilation film

- Theatrical Poster
- Directed by: Charles Lamont; Charles Barton; Arthur Lubin; Jean Yarbrough; William A. Seiter; Erle C. Kenton (archive footage)
- Written by: Gene Wood (Narration)
- Produced by: Max J. Rosenberg; Milton Subotsky
- Starring: Bud Abbott; Lou Costello (archive footage)
- Narrated by: Jack E. Leonard
- Edited by: Sidney Meyer
- Music by: Joseph Gershenson
- Distributed by: Universal Pictures
- Release date: April 8, 1965
- Running time: 75 minutes
- Country: United States
- Language: English

The World of Abbott and Costello is a 1965 American compilation film starring the comedy team of Abbott and Costello.

== Plot ==
This film is a compilation of scenes from eighteen films that Abbott and Costello made for Universal Pictures between 1941 and 1955. Comedian Jack E. Leonard provides the narration for the film, which incorporates scenes from the following films:

- Abbott and Costello Go to Mars, directed by Charles Lamont
- Abbott and Costello in the Foreign Legion, directed by Charles Lamont
- Abbott and Costello Meet Frankenstein, directed by Charles Barton
- Abbott and Costello Meet the Keystone Kops, directed by Charles Lamont
- Abbott and Costello Meet the Mummy, directed by Charles Lamont
- Buck Privates, directed by Arthur Lubin
- Buck Privates Come Home, directed by Charles Barton
- Comin' Round The Mountain, directed by Charles Lamont
- Hit The Ice, directed by Charles Lamont
- In Society, directed by Jean Yarbrough
- In The Navy, directed by Arthur Lubin
- The Wistful Widow of Wagon Gap, directed by Charles Barton
- Little Giant, directed by William A. Seiter
- Lost in Alaska, directed by Jean Yarbrough
- Mexican Hayride, directed by Charles Barton
- The Naughty Nineties, directed by Jean Yarbrough
- Ride 'Em Cowboy, directed by Arthur Lubin
- Who Done It?, directed by Erle C. Kenton

== Prior compilation appearance ==
A year earlier, Metro-Goldwyn-Mayer released a compilation film, MGM's Big Parade of Comedy, which includes a scene from the Abbott and Costello film, Rio Rita, released by MGM in 1942.

== Release ==
The World of Abbott and Costello was theatrically released by Universal Pictures in 1965 as part of a double feature with McHale's Navy Joins the Air Force.

== Home media ==
The film has been released twice on DVD: the first time, on The Best of Abbott and Costello Volume Four, on October 4, 2005, and again on October 28, 2008, as a bonus feature in the Abbott and Costello: The Complete Universal Pictures Collection.
