= Savignac =

Savignac may refer to:

== People ==
- Antonio Enríquez Savignac (1931–2007), Mexican politician
- Jean-Paul Savignac, French translator, especially of Gaulish
- Joseph-Marie Savignac, Canadian politician in the 1920s–1950s
- Raphaël Savignac (1874–1951), French archaeologist and phtographer
- Raymond Savignac (1907–2002), graphic artist
- Richard Savignac (1905–1991), French boxer at the 1924 Olympics

== Communes in France ==
=== Dordogne department ===
- Savignac-de-Miremont
- Savignac-de-Nontron
- Savignac-Lédrier
- Savignac-les-Églises
- Savignac-Mona

=== Gironde department ===
- Savignac, Gironde
- Savignac-de-l'Isle

=== Lot-et-Garonne department ===
- Savignac-de-Duras
- Savignac-sur-Leyze

=== Elsewhere in France ===
- Savignac, Aveyron, Aveyron department
- Savignac-les-Ormeaux, Ariège department

== See also ==
- Savigniac Order, a monastic order; see Congregation of Savigny
