= René Lefèvre =

René Lefèvre may refer to:

- René Lefèvre (aviator), French aviator
- René Lefèvre (journalist), French journalist
- René Lefèvre (actor) (1898–1994), French actor
