= List of Spanish films of 1965 =

A list of films produced in Spain in 1965 (see 1965 in film).

== 1965 ==
| Title | Director | Cast | Genre | Notes |
|---|---|---|---|---|
1965
| The Art of Living | Julio Diamante | | | Entered into the 15th Berlin International Film Festival |
| Acteón | Jorge Grau | | | Entered into the 4th Moscow International Film Festival |
| Crimen de doble filo | José Luis Borau | Susana Campos, Carlos Estrada | Crime | |
| Fata Morgana | Vicente Aranda | | | First Aranda's film; Escuela de Barcelona |
| Kingdom of the Silver Lion | Franz Josef Gottlieb | Lex Barker, Marie Versini, Ralf Wolter | Adventure | Co-production with West Germany |
| Más bonita que ninguna | Luis César Amadori | Rocío Dúrcal, Luigi Giuliani, Gracita Morales | Comedy musical | |
| Misión Lisboa | | | Spy | |
| Mission to Caracas | | | Spy | |
| El mundo sigue | Fernando Fernán Gómez | Lina Canalejas, Gemma Cuervo | Drama | Never released in cinemas; very hard to see or find |
| Seven Hours of Gunfire | Joaquín Luis Romero Marchent | Rik Van Nutter, Adrian Hoven | Western | Co-production with Italy & West Germany |
| Snakes and Ladders | Manuel Summers | | | Entered into the 1965 Cannes Film Festival |
| The Uninhibited | Juan Antonio Bardem | | | Entered into the 1965 Cannes Film Festival |
| Wild Kurdistan | Franz Josef Gottlieb | Lex Barker, Marie Versini, Ralf Wolter | Adventure | Co-production with West Germany |
