= René Lefèvre (journalist) =

French journalist

René Lefèvre (French pronunciation: [ʁəne ləfɛvʁ]) was a French journalist who joined the satirical newspaper Canard enchaîné at the time of the Algerian War. In 1958, at Lefèvre's instigation, the paper created a special prize for Bernard Clavel, for his early novel Qui m’emporte. The prize, called Prix des Petits Pères (Prize of the Little Fathers), marked the first time that Clavel came to the attention of the French literary establishment.

== Sources ==
- Clavel, Bernard and Rivard, Adéline. Bernard Clavel, qui êtes-vous?, J'ai lu, 1985, p. 84. ISBN 2277218952
- Martin, Laurent. Le Canard enchaîné, ou, Les fortunes de la vertu: histoire d'un journal satirique, 1915-2000. Flammarion, 2001, p. 305. ISBN 2080680412
