= The Fool Killer =

1965 film by Servando González

- Directed by: Servando González
- Screenplay by: Morton S. Fine; David Friedkin
- Based on: The Fool Killer; 1954 novel by Helen Eustis
- Produced by: David Friedkin
- Starring: Anthony Perkins; Edward Albert; Dana Elcar; Henry Hull; Salome Jens
- Cinematography: Alex Phillips Jr.
- Edited by: Juan Marino; Ralph Rosenblum
- Music by: Gustavo César Carrión
- Distributed by: American International Pictures (US)
- Release date: April 28, 1965
- Running time: 99 minutes
- Countries: Mexico; United States
- Language: English

The Fool Killer (also known as Violent Journey) is a 1965 Southern Gothic coming-of-age adventure film directed by Servando González and written by Morton S. Fine and David Friedkin, who adapted their screenplay from the 1954 Helen Eustis novel of the same name.

Set in the Reconstruction era, the film follows George Mellish (Edward Albert), a 12-year-old boy who flees his abusive foster parents and travels across the Southern United States meeting several colorful characters, including Milo Bogardus (Anthony Perkins), an amnesiac American Civil War veteran.

The film was independently produced and shot on location in and around the city of Knoxville, Tennessee.

== Plot ==
After performing a multitude of other chores for his foster parents in the post-Civil War South, 12-year-old orphan George Mellish is beaten for carelessly knocking the butter churn into the road. George laments what a bad boy he is and how much he despises his foster parents. He hears a train coming and grabs a bag of his possessions which he has at the ready. He crawls into a small space under one of the cars. George falls asleep and climbs out from under the train when it stops to collect water. He is not fast enough to make it back before the train departs.

He watches forlornly as his small bag of possessions was left behind on the train. Undaunted, George starts walking West, the same direction the train was heading. He walks a long way and finally encounters Dirty Jim Jelliman, an old man living alone. They become friends, and George stays for several weeks. Jim calls George a fool when he tries to clean Jim’s house. He then tells George a chilling story about the Fool Killer, an 8-foot tall man who roams the countryside looking for fools to kill with his supernaturally sharp "chopper".

When they go to town one day, George falls ill and is taken in by a local family. He runs off again and stumbles into the camp of a tall man who treats him roughly in order to keep George silent. The next morning, the man makes George breakfast and apologizes for treating him so roughly. He introduces himself as Milo Bogardus but instantly admits he stole the name from a dying soldier.

With Milo, George recreates the same kind of friendship he had with Jim. They spend a great deal of time with each other. Milo has amnesia from a traumatic experience in the war. He avoids people and towns because they get changed when they are together. A tent revival draws George's interest. Milo sneers at the idea of a preacher tricking people into believing they are sinful and offering them a cure for it but agrees to go along with George, when the boy is curious and wants to go.

In the tent, Reverend Spotts gives a fire and brimstone sermon that sends George into a religious frenzy. He begs to be saved. The next morning it is discovered that Spotts has been killed brutally with an axe. George is despondent to find that Milo has disappeared without saying goodbye. George wanders into town and is taken in by the Dodds, a childless couple who run a general store.

After some time living contentedly with the Dodds, George sees Milo in town and excitedly invites him to dinner. Milo becomes distinctly agitated as Mr. Dodd says the dinner prayer. Mr. Dodd references the killing of Reverend Spotts. George tells them it must have been the work of the Fool Killer and relates the legend. Milo thanks them for their hospitality and abruptly leaves. George runs after Milo, who tells him he is disturbed by how civilized George has become in the Dodd's house.

Armed with an axe, Milo climbs into Mrs. Dodd's bedroom window. George believes Milo is the Fool Killer. He stands in front of Mrs. Dodd and begs Mr. Dodd not to shoot Milo. Mr. Dodd lowers his gun. Milo is shamed by George's presence. He climbs out the window onto the roof and jumps to his death. Bored with the tranquility of life with the Dodds, George ponders resuming his travels while he roams the train yard. As a train departs, he races to catch it but then simply stands on the tracks and waves goodbye as it pulls far away.

== Cast ==
- Anthony Perkins as Milo Bogardus
- Edward Albert as George Mellish
- Henry Hull as Dirty Jim Jelliman
- Salome Jens as Mrs. Dodd
- Dana Elcar as Mr. Dodd
- Charlotte Jones as Mrs. Ova Fanshawe
- Arnold Moss as Reverend Spotts
- Sindee Ann Richards as Blessing Angeline Fanshawe
- Lana Wood as Alice (uncredited)

== Reception ==
The film was barely distributed in 1965. A re-edited version was released in 1969. The casting of Anthony Perkins was criticized as trite, given his work in Psycho. Edward Albert's performance was highly praised. Vincent Canby derided Servando González's direction, "he has anthologized almost five decades of cinematic clichés — obtrusive wipes, wobbly dissolves and bizarre camera angles that have no relation to the scene being performed.

In addition to the acting, Alex Phillips Jr.'s cinematography is seen as one of the film's strengths. Joe Dante programmed The Fool Killer on a double bill with The Night of the Hunter for Turner Classic Movies in July 2025.

The story Dirty Jim tells George aligns with the folklore of the American west. The Fool Killer was a common bogeyman, and children were warned, "fool-killer's gonna getcha".

== See also ==
- List of American films of 1965
- List of Mexican films of 1965
