= Abbott and Costello Meet the Mummy =

1955 film by Charles Lamont

- Theatrical release poster
- Directed by: Charles Lamont
- Screenplay by: John Grant
- Story by: Lee Loeb
- Produced by: Howard Christie
- Starring: Bud Abbott; Lou Costello; Marie Windsor; Michael Ansara; Peggy King; Richard Deacon; Mel Welles
- Cinematography: George Robinson
- Edited by: Russell Schoengarth
- Music by: Joseph Gershenson (supervisor); Uncredited: Irving Gertz; Henry Mancini; Lou Maury; Hans J. Salter
- Distributed by: Universal-International
- Release date: April 16, 1955 (Rantoul, Illinois)
- Running time: 79 minutes
- Country: United States
- Language: English
- Budget: $726,250

Abbott and Costello Meet the Mummy is a 1955 American horror comedy film directed by Charles Lamont and starring the comedy team of Abbott and Costello. It is the sixth entry in Universal's original Mummy franchise and the 28th and final Abbott and Costello film produced by Universal-International.

The film is primarily set in Cairo. Two expatriate Americans are supposed to work as guardians of a mummy during its transportation, but their prospective employer is murdered and the mummy is stolen. The duo are left in possession of a sacred medallion which supposedly records the location of a hidden treasure. They get acquainted with a female treasure hunter and with the modern followers of the mummy.

== Plot ==
Two Americans, Abbott and Costello, who are stranded in Cairo, Egypt, overhear Dr. Gustav Zoomer discussing the mummy Klaris, the guardian of the Tomb of Princess Ara. Apparently, the mummy has a sacred medallion that shows where the treasure of Princess Ara can be found. The followers of Klaris, led by Semu, overhear the conversation along with Madame Rontru, a businesswoman interested in stealing the treasure of Princess Ara.

Abbott and Costello go to the doctor's house to apply for the position to accompany the mummy back to America. However, two of Semu's men, Iben and Hetsut, murder the doctor and steal the mummy just before Abbott and Costello arrive. The medallion has been left behind, though, and is found by Abbott and Costello, who attempt to sell it. Rontru offers them $100, but Abbott suspects it is worth much more and asks for $5,000, which Rontru agrees to pay.

Rontru tells them to meet her at the Cafe Bagdad, where Abbott and Costello learn from a waiter that the medallion is cursed. They frantically try to give it to one another, until it winds up in Costello's hamburger and he eats it. Rontru arrives and drags them to a doctor's office to get a look at the medallion under a fluoroscope. However, she cannot read the medallion's inscribed instructions, which are in hieroglyphics. Semu arrives, posing as an archaeologist, and offers to guide them all to the tomb. Meanwhile, Semu's followers have returned life to Klaris.

They arrive at the tomb, where Costello learns of Semu's plans to murder them all. Rontru captures Semu, while one of her men, Charlie, disguises himself as a mummy and enters the temple. Abbott follows suit by disguising himself as a mummy, and he and Costello rescue Semu. Eventually all three mummies are in the same place at the same time, and the dynamite that Rontru intends to use to dig up the treasure detonates, killing Klaris and revealing the treasure. Abbott and Costello convince Semu to turn the temple into a nightclub to preserve the legend of Klaris.

== Cast ==
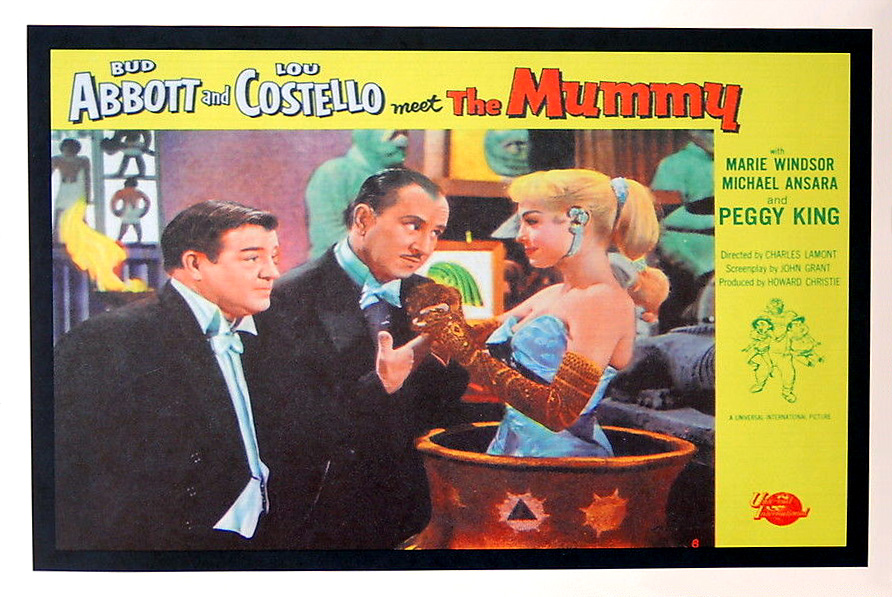
Lobby card

- Bud Abbott as himself
- Lou Costello as himself
- Marie Windsor as Madame Rontru
- Michael Ansara as Charlie
- Dan Seymour as Josef
- Richard Deacon as Semu
- Kurt Katch as Dr. Gustav Zoomer
- Richard Karlan as Hetsut
- Mel Welles as Iben
- George Khoury as Habid
- Eddie Parker as Klaris, the Mummy
- Mazzone-Abbott Dancers as dance troupe
- Chandra Kaly and His Dancers as dance troupe
- Peggy King as vocalist

=== Cast notes ===
Costello's daughter, Carole Costello, has a small part as a flower girl. She was 16 years old at the time.

Although Abbott and Costello were called "Pete Patterson" and "Freddie Franklin" in the script and in the closing credits, they used their real names onscreen during filming.

== Production ==
Abbott and Costello Meet the Mummy was filmed from October 28 through November 24, 1954 and is the last film that Abbott and Costello made for Universal Pictures, although Universal released a compilation film of clips from their films, titled The World of Abbott and Costello in 1965. The day after filming completed, Abbott and Costello arrived in New York City to ride on the first float of the annual Macy's Thanksgiving Day Parade.

Beginning with Universal's The Mummy's Hand (1940), the Mummy was called "Kharis", but in this film, it is called "Klaris". Stuntman Eddie Parker (billed as "Edwin") played the mummy. He had previously doubled Lon Chaney Jr. in Universal's earlier Mummy films.

== Routines ==
- A variation of the swapping poison distraction game in which Bud and Lou each try to hide the cursed medallion in the other man's hamburger, before Lou winds up eating it.
- "Take Your Pick" - Lou becomes confused over pick as in pickaxe vs pick as in choice.
- Lou keeps charming a snake out of a basket whenever he plays the clarinet. When Bud does so, he gets a pretty girl to kiss.

== Release ==
Abbott and Costello Meet the Mummy was shown in Rantoul, Illinois on April 16, 1955. It was later released on June 10, 1955 on a double bill with Universal's This Island Earth.

== Home media ==
The film was released on VHS in the United States by Universal Home Video in October 1993. This film has been released several times on DVD. Originally released as a single DVD on August 28, 2001, it was released three times as part of different Abbott and Costello collections: The Best of Abbott and Costello Volume Four, on October 4, 2005; on October 28, 2008, as part of Abbott and Costello: The Complete Universal Pictures Collection; and in 2015 in the Abbott and Costello Meet the Monsters Collection. The film was released as part of the 3-disc The Mummy: The Complete Legacy Collection and the 21-disc Universal Classic Monsters: Complete 30-Film Collection on September 2, 2014.

== Merchandise ==
The design for the Mummy figure in the 1986 Universal-licensed Classic Movie Monsters series from Imperial Toys was based on the monster from this film.

== In popular culture ==
The film is mentioned in the Everybody Loves Raymond episode "Grandpa Steals"; Frank invites his grandkids to come watch it with him.
