= List of Soviet films of 1965 =

A list of films produced in the Soviet Union in 1965 (see 1965 in film).

== 1965 ==
| Title | Original title | Director | Cast | Genre | Notes |
|---|---|---|---|---|---|
1965
| Adventures of a Dentist | Похождения зубного врача | Elem Klimov | Andrey Myagkov, Vera Vasilyeva, Alisa Freindlich | Comedy | |
| The Bridge Is Built | Строится мост | Gavriil Egiazarov, Oleg Efremov | Igor Vasilev | Drama | |
| Clean Ponds | Чистые пруды | Aleksey Sakharov | Aleksandr Zbruyev | Drama | |
| The Cook | Стряпуха | Edmond Keosayan | Svetlana Svetlichnaya | Comedy | |
| At Early Morning | Рано утром | Tatyana Lioznova | Nikolay Merzlikin | Drama | |
| The First Teacher | Первый учитель | Andrei Konchalovsky | Bolot Beyshenaliyev, Natalya Arinbasarova | Drama | |
| Friends and Years | Друзья и годы | Viktor Sokolov | Aleksandr Grave | Drama | |
| The Girl and the Echo | Девочка и эхо | Arūnas Žebriūnas | Lina Braknytė | Drama | |
| Give me a complaints book | Дайте жалобную книгу | Eldar Ryazanov | Oleg Borisov, Larisa Golubkina, Anatoly Kuznetsov, Anatoli Papanov | Comedy | |
| The Hockey Players | Хоккеисты | Rafail Goldin | Vyacheslav Shalevich, Vladimir Ivashov | Sports drama | |
| The Hyperboloid of Engineer Garin | Гиперболоид инженера Гарина | Aleksandr Gintsburg | Yevgeniy Yevstigneyev, Vsevolod Safonov, Mikhail Astangov, Natalya Klimova | Sci-fi | |
| I Am Twenty | Мне двадцать лет | Marlen Khutsiev | Valentin Popov, Nikolai Gubenko, Stanislav Lyubshin | Drama | |
| Lebedev against Lebedev | Лебедев против Лебедева | Genrikh Gabay | Aleksey Eybozhenko | Drama | |
| Luna | Луна | Pavel Klushantsev | | Popular Science, Sci-fi | Won the "Golden Seal of Trieste" at the IV International Science-Fiction Film Festival in Italy, 1966 |
| A Mother's Heart | Сердце матери | Mark Donskoy | Yelena Fadeyeva | Biopic | USSR State Prize, 1968 |
| Operation Y and Other Shurik's Adventures | Операция «Ы» и другие приключения Шурика | Leonid Gaidai | Aleksandr Demyanenko, Aleksey Smirnov, Natalya Seleznyova, Yuri Nikulin, Georgy Vitsin, Yevgeny Morgunov | Comedy | |
| On the Same Planet | На одной планете | Ilya Olshvanger | Innokenty Smoktunovsky | Drama | |
| Our House | Наш дом | Vasily Pronin | Anatoliy Papanov | Drama | |
| The Salvos of the Aurora Cruiser | Залп «Авроры» | Yuri Vyshinsky | Sergey Boyarsky | Drama | |
| Shadows of Forgotten Ancestors | Тени забытых предков | Sergei Parajanov | Ivan Mykolaichuk, Larisa Kadochnikova, Tatyana Bestayeva | Drama | |
| There Was an Old Couple | Жили-были старик со старухой | Grigori Chukhrai | Ivan Marin, Vera Kuznetsova, Lyudmila Maksakova, Georgi Martynyuk, Galina Polskikh | Drama | Entered into the 1965 Cannes Film Festival |
| They're Calling, Open the Door | Звонят, откройте дверь | Alexander Mitta | Elena Proklova | Drama | |
| Thirty Three | Тридцать три | Georgi Daneliya | Yevgeny Leonov, Nonna Mordyukova, Lyubov Sokolova, Viktor Avdyushko, Saveliy Kramarov | Comedy | |
| Time, Forward! | Время, вперёд! | Sofiya Milkina, Mikhail Shveytser | Sergei Yursky, Leonid Kuravlyov, Inna Gulaya | Drama | |
| Triumph Over Violence | Обыкновенный фашизм | Mikhail Romm | | Documentary | |
| Your Son and Brother | Ваш сын и брат | Vasily Shukshin | Vsevolod Sanayev, Leonid Kuravlyov | Drama | |
| War and Peace | Война и мир | Sergei Bondarchuk | Ludmila Savelyeva, Sergei Bondarchuk, Vyacheslav Tikhonov | Drama | Won the Grand Prix at the 4th Moscow International Film Festival |
| Workers' Settlement | Рабочий посёлок | Vladimir Vengerov | Oleg Borisov | Drama | |
