= List of Mexican films of 1965 =

A list of the films produced in Mexico in 1965 (see 1965 in film):

== 1965 ==
Title	Director	Cast	Genre	Notes
1965
Los bienamados	Juan José Gurrola, Juan Ibáñez			
La Loba	Rafael Baledón	Columba Domínguez, Kitty de Hoyos		
Tarahumara	Luis Alcoriza	Ignacio López Tarso, Aurora Clavel		Won the FIPRESCI Prize at the 1965 Cannes Film Festival
Canta mi corazón	Emilio Gómez Muriel	Libertad Lamarque, Enrique Guzmán, Sara García, Roberto Cañedo, Blanca Sánchez		
Guadalajara en verano	Julio Bracho	Elizabeth Campbell, Alicia Bonet, Claudio Brook, David Reynoso, Enrique Rocha		
Tintansón Crusoe	Gilberto Martínez Solares	Tin Tan, Elvira Quintana		
Loco por ellas	Manuel de la Pedrosa	Tin Tan, Lorena Velázquez		Co-production with Venezuela
El pecador	Rafael Baledón	Arturo de Córdova, Marga López		
El señor doctor	Miguel M. Delgado	Cantinflas, Marta Romero, Miguel Ángel Álvarez, Prudencia Grifell, Wolf Ruvinskis		
Tajimara	Juan José Gurrola	Claudio Obregón, Pilar Pellicer, Beatriz Sheridan		
Los cuervos están de luto	Francisco del Villar	Silvia Pinal, Kitty de Hoyos, Lilia Prado, Enrique Álvarez Félix		
Cada voz lleva su angustia	Julio Bracho	José Gálvez, Enrique Pontón, Lyda Zamora		Co-production with Colombia
Simón del desierto	Luis Buñuel	Silvia Pinal, Claudio Brook		
Alma llanera	Gilberto Martínez Solares	Antonio Aguilar, Flor Silvestre, Manuel Capetillo		
El hijo de Huracán Ramírez	Joselito Rodríguez	David Silva		
El rifle implacable	Miguel M. Delgado	Antonio Aguilar, Flor Silvestre, Olivia Michel, Víctor Junco		
El zurdo	Arturo Martínez	Rodolfo de Anda, Germán Robles, Andrés Soler, Noé Murayama		
Escuela para solteras		Luis Aguilar, Antonio Aguilar, Amador Bendayán		
Los reyes del volante	Miguel Morayta	Marco Antonio Campos, Gaspar Henaine, Fanny Cano		
Nos lleva la tristeza		Sara García		
Sólo de noche vienes	Sergio Véjar	Elsa Aguirre, Julio Alemán		
The First Adventure	Tulio Demicheli	José Calvo, Nino del Arco, Pedro Mari Sánchez		Co-production with Spain
The Fool Killer	Servando González	Anthony Perkins, Edward Albert		
The Gangster	Luis Alcoriza			
