= Jack E. Leonard =

American comedian and actor (1910–1973)

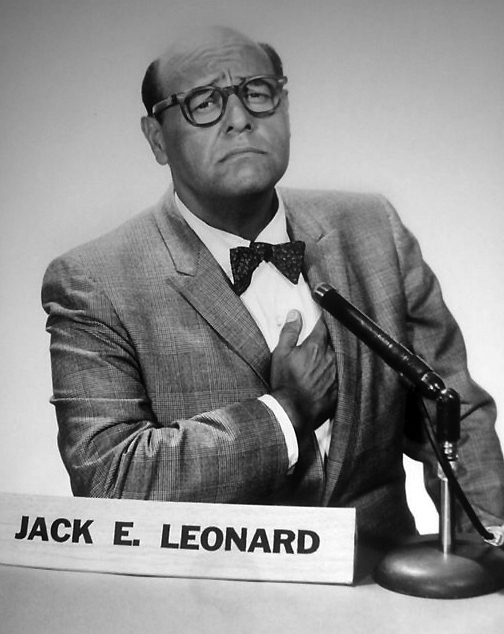
- Leonard in 1959
- Born: Leonard Lebitsky; April 24, 1910; Chicago, Illinois, U.S.
- Died: May 10, 1973 (aged 63); New York City, New York, U.S.
- Occupations: Comedian, actor
- Years active: 1943–1972
- Spouses: Katherine E. "Kay" Rosen (m. 1945; died 1967); Gladys E. Leonard (m.1970; until his death 1973)
- Children: Wanda E. Leonard, Brenda Leonard-Cowart, Linnda Leonard-Noback

Jack E. Leonard (born Leonard Lebitsky; April 24, 1910 – May 10, 1973) was an American comedian and actor who made frequent appearances on television variety and game shows.

== Biography ==
Leonard was born Leonard Lebitsky on April 24, 1910, in Chicago, which he described as "You know, the city where kids play robbers and robbers". His father was Jewish tailor. He claimed one of his childhood friends was gangster (born in the same city in 1908). As a young man, Leonard worked as a lifeguard ("I swam against Johnny Weissmuller ... and he was so fast I haven't seen him since"), and first worked professionally as a dancer, competing in Charleston contests. In the 1930s, he joined a vaudeville troupe, then began touring with the big bands, playing nightclubs all over the country. During World War II he toured bases with the United Service Organizations.

The Tonight Show, hosted by Jack Paar between 1957 and 1962, marked Leonard's first national exposure. For the next several years, he worked steadily in casinos and nightclubs on the Las Vegas Strip, and made hundreds of television appearances on various panel and variety shows. He made occasional recordings, and appeared in a handful of motion pictures, such as Three Sailors and a Girl.

Leonard's comedic method was sarcastic and aggressive, creating an "insult humor" genre which anticipated Don Rickles. Leonard was roastmaster at the Friars' Club roast of Rickles, who he introduced as "a man who's been doing my act for about 12 years now." A trademark line, after taking off his hat to reveal his bald head: "What did you expect, feathers?" He also referenced his weight problem in his act. Leonard's strong and unapologetic onstage personality ("Good evening, opponents!") belied a gentle and giving spirit that would occasionally be revealed in his act when he would sing a sentimental song.

He wore a distinctive outfit: a dark suit, purposely two sizes too small, a white narrow-brimmed hat, and horn-rimmed glasses. On one variety show, Leonard's contemporaneous popularity was demonstrated when a lookalike came on stage and did a Leonard-like schtick. Leonard then walked on stage and addressed his doppelgänger: "You've got a great future, son, but not in this business!"

In 1966, Leonard was back on The Tonight Show when his old friend Jerry Lewis was guest-hosting it. The comics had worked together just two years before on Lewis's movie The Disorderly Orderly, but for some reason the two got "into an ugly spat" and Leonard walked off, "leaving Jerry looking dazed and hurt."

In March 1973, he collapsed shortly after finishing a performance at the Rainbow Room in New York City and underwent emergency cardiac bypass surgery, but died several weeks later at age 63.

== Discography ==
- Rock and Roll for Kids Over Sixteen (1957) Vik LX-1080 mono
- How to Lose Weight with Fat Jack (1964)
- Scream on Someone You Love Today (1967)

== Partial filmography ==
- Three Sailors and a Girl (1953) – Porky
- The Disorderly Orderly (1964) – Fat Jack
- The World of Abbott and Costello (1965) – Narrator (compilation of clips from Abbott and Costello movies)
- The Dictator's Guns (1965) – Keefer
- The Fat Spy (1966) – Irving / Herman Gonjular (Twins)
- A Man Called Adam (1966) – Himself, Party Guest (uncredited)
- Target: Harry (1969) – Valdez
- Journey Back to Oz (1972) – The Signpost (voice) (final film role)
