= Three Sailors and a Girl =

1953 film by Roy Del Ruth

- Directed by: Roy Del Ruth
- Written by: Devery Freeman; Roland Kibbee
- Based on: The Butter and Egg Man; 1925 play by George S. Kaufman
- Produced by: Sammy Cahn
- Starring: Jane Powell; Gordon MacRae; Gene Nelson; Sam Levene; George Givot; Jack E. Leonard
- Cinematography: Carl E. Guthrie
- Edited by: Owen Marks
- Music by: Sammy Fain; Lyrics by Sammy Cahn; Music supervision Ray Heindorf
- Production company: Warner Bros. Pictures
- Distributed by: Warner Bros. Pictures
- Release date: November 23, 1953
- Running time: 95 minutes
- Country: United States
- Language: English
- Box office: $1.9 million

Three Sailors and a Girl is a 1953 American Technicolor musical film made by Warner Bros. Pictures. It was directed by Roy Del Ruth and written by Devery Freeman and Roland Kibbee, based on the George S. Kaufman play The Butter and Egg Man. Ray Heindorf was the musical director, with orchestrations by Gus Levene, and vocal arrangements by Norman Luboff. Choreography was by LeRoy Prinz.

The soundtrack features original songs with music composed by Sammy Fain and lyrics by Sammy Cahn. As was the practice at the time, the soundtrack album was a studio recording [Capitol L-485 (10-inch LP) and FBF-485 (2 EP Box-Set)]. The Capitol Records album was released early in 1954, and featured eight of the songs from the Fein/Cahn songwriting team. The film's stars Jane Powell and Gordon MacRae are the featured vocalists. George Greeley conducted the orchestra and chorus. The album was re-issued and released on CD in 2006; it contained 12 more songs by MacRae.

== Plot ==
While their submarine is docked in New York City, three sailors on liberty invest the money they've earned at sea in a Broadway musical and its up-and-coming star.

Choirboy Jones (Gordon MacRae) carries a gunnysack stuffed with $50,000 in cash from his fellow sailors. Joe Woods (Sam Levene), producing a new show starring the singer Emilio Rossi (George Givot), is delighted to find a new investor, but female lead Penny Weston (Jane Powell) is worried that the boys are in over their heads.

After the show's out-of-town opening is a flop, Woods, Rossi and even the author want out. Penny consults some distinguished Broadway artists for their advice, which includes casting the talented singer Jones, dancer Twitch (Gene Nelson) and comic Porky (Jack E. Leonard) in key roles. The show is a smash and the sailors reap a handsome return on their investment, with Jones and Penny falling in love as a bonus.

== Cast ==
- Jane Powell as Penny Weston
- Gordon MacRae as "Choirboy" Jones
- Gene Nelson as Twitch
- Sam Levene as Joe Woods
- Jack E. Leonard as Porky
- George Givot as Emilio Rossi
- Veda Ann Borg as Faye Foss
- Archer MacDonald as Webster
- Raymond Greenleaf as Morrow
- Henry Slate as Hank the Sailor

Burt Lancaster made an uncredited cameo appearance at the end, playing a Marine who hesitantly asks about taking over the starring role in the musical after Jones has to return to the Navy. Joe Woods brushes him off. When a woman asks why he was so brusque, Joe tells her that the Marine looked too much like Burt Lancaster. Merv Griffin also appeared uncredited as one of the sailors. Jack Larson who played Jimmy Olsen in the TV series Adventures of Superman appeared uncredited as a sailor.

== Soundtrack songs ==
- "Face to Face" - Music by Sammy Fain; Lyrics by Sammy Cahn
- "You're But Oh Right" - Music by Sammy Fain; Lyrics by Sammy Cahn
- "There Must Be a Reason" - Music by Sammy Fain; Lyrics by Sammy Cahn
- "When It's Love" - Music by Sammy Fain; Lyrics by Sammy Cahn
- "I Get Butterflies" - Music by Sammy Fain; Lyrics by Sammy Cahn
- "Kiss Me or I'll Scream" - Music by Sammy Fain; Lyrics by Sammy Cahn
- "The Lately Song" - Music by Sammy Fain; Lyrics by Sammy Cahn
- "Show Me a Happy Woman (and I'll Show you a Miserable Man)" - Music by Sammy Fain; Lyrics by Sammy Cahn
- "It's Going to Be a Big Hit" - Music by Sammy Fain; Lyrics by Sammy Cahn
- "Home Is Where the Heart Is" - Music by Sammy Fain; Lyrics by Sammy Cahn
- "My Heart Is a Singing Heart" - Music by Sammy Fain; Lyrics by Sammy Cahn
- "Embraceable You" - Music by George Gershwin; Lyrics by Ira Gershwin
- "The Japanese Sandman" - Words and Music by Richard a Whiting (background in nightclub scene)
- "The Marines' Hymn" - Music by Jacques Offenbach
