= Abbott and Costello Meet the Keystone Kops =

1955 film by Charles Lamont

- Theatrical release poster
- Directed by: Charles Lamont
- Screenplay by: John Grant
- Story by: Lee Loeb
- Produced by: Howard Christie
- Starring: Bud Abbott; Lou Costello; Fred Clark; Mack Sennett
- Cinematography: Reggie Lanning
- Edited by: Edward Curtiss
- Music by: William Lava; Henry Mancini; Herman Stein
- Production company: Universal-International
- Distributed by: Universal Pictures
- Release date: January 31, 1955
- Running time: 78 min.
- Language: English
- Budget: $743,520

Abbott and Costello Meet the Keystone Kops is a 1955 comedy film directed by Charles Lamont and starring the comedy team of Abbott and Costello.

After the film was completed, Universal-International wanted to rename it Abbott and Costello in the Stunt Men, because they did not consider the "Keystone Kops" to be relevant anymore. However, in October 1954, the studio relented and agreed to use the "Keystone Kops" name.

== Plot ==
Willie Piper is in a nickelodeon watching a silent film: "Eliza and the Bloodhounds" a melodrama which ends with a mother and small child escaping in a snowstorm across a frozen river from a pack of hounds. He gets thrown out for being too demonstrative in the film. His friend Harry Pierce is waiting outside, he shows him an advert in a newspaper looking for people to invest $5,000 in a motion picture studio, exactly the amount of cash they have.

They are sold a deed to the West Orange Studio by a con man, Joe Gorman, on the pretext that he has two studios, one in Brooklyn and one in West Orange, New Jersey, and the travel is getting too much. It appears Gorman has sold the studio multiple times, but it is not even his studio, it is Edison's original studio. They realise that they have been swindled. Leaving the studio Willie gets his foot trapped in a railway line with a train approaching and narrowly escapes injury. They get a lift from an old man with a wagon and horses heading to California they then jump on a train but get off very prematurely. They get a second train loaded with cattle. The guard throws them off.

Meanwhile, Gorman has adopted a new identity as the European film director Sergei Toumanoff. He is also travelling by train to California, with his girlfriend, Leota Van Cleef, who hopes to be a film star.

Meanwhile, Harry and Willie are trying to catch up with Gorman across the country in hope of getting their money back. A group of hobos find them sleeping by a campfire, and swap clothes, so they continue, dressed as hobos. They re-encounter the old man and wagon and con him into giving them $20 which they use to try pay to get on a freight train. They play dice with the train guards and win their uniforms. They do not realise how close they are to Los Angeles and stumble onto the set of the western film that Toumanoff happens to be directing. They think they are under attack by Indians, but are saved by the cavalry. Then they are left on a runaway wagon. Leota rides up dressed as a squaw. Toumanoff is furious with the interruption, but the head of the movie studio, Mr. Snavely, hires Harry and Willie because he is impressed with their "stunt work". Harry and Willie fail to recognise Gorman.

Willie has to dress as a woman, to be Leota's stunt double during a dangerous stunt flying in a biplane. But Toumanoff is plotting to dispose of Harry and Willie before they can learn his true identity. They take off without a pilot. Toumanoff's henchman, Hinds, has sabotaged their parachute and arranged for live bullets to be fired from the other plane in the scene, but Harry and Willie manage to avoid harm. After viewing the film rushes of the airplane stunt, they decide they have accidentally created a good comedy film. Snavely decides that Harry and Willie are a great comedy team, and assigns a visibly annoyed Toumanoff to direct them in a new film.

Snavely is aware that Toumanoff is actually Gorman, and requires Gorman to repay Willie and Harry the $5000 through their wages, but must stick to comedy films. Toumanoff agrees.

A burglar breaks into Toumanoff's house at the same time as Harry is trying to break in. Harry gets arrested by the real police. Willie (in Keystone outfit) bungles the arrest of the real robber. Confusion ensues.

Gorman and Leota then go about robbing the studio safe of $75,000, but are discovered by Harry and Willie (now both dressed as cops), who give chase. The studio's Keystone Kops are asked by Harry and Willie, who believe they are real policemen, to assist in the chase. The Kops decide to play along, believing that they are on the same work team. Willie and Harry fall off the cop wagon and obtain a motorcycle and sidecar, creating a three vehicle chase through the woods.

The chase ends at the film set where Gorman tries to escape on the biplane but is caught. Unfortunately, the stolen money is blown away by the wind generated by the airplane's propeller.

== Cast ==
- Bud Abbott as Harry Pierce
- Lou Costello as Willie Piper
- Fred Clark as Joseph Gorman/Sergei Toumanoff
- Lynn Bari as Leota Van Cleef
- Maxie Rosenbloom as Hinds
- Harold Goodwin as Cameraman
- Roscoe Ates as Wagon Driver
- Mack Sennett as himself
- Heinie Conklin as Sennett comic
- Hank Mann as Prop Man
- Joe Besser as Hunter that Piper borrows a rifle from (uncredited)

== Production ==
=== Casting ===
Lou Costello's daughter Carole played the theater cashier at the beginning of the film, hence the in-joke:

Lou: You're cute.

Cashier: You're silly.

Lou: So's your old man.

=== Filming ===
Scenes were shot between June 7 through July 9, 1954, and included cameos by Costello's daughter, Carole, as a theater cashier, Keystone Cops director Mack Sennett as himself, as well as three original Keystone Cops, Hank Mann, Heinie Conklin, and Herold Goodwin.

The scenes at the very beginning of the film, where Costello's character, Willie Piper, is watching the film Eliza and the Bloodhounds in a theater, featured stock footage from Universal's 1927 silent version of Uncle Tom's Cabin.

== Home media ==
Parts of this film were edited into silent film reels and released as part of Castle Films' 8 mm home movie library. Two of these reels were known as "Hollywood and Bust" and "Have Badge Will Chase."

The film was released twice on DVD, on The Best of Abbott and Costello Volume Four, on October 4, 2005, and again on October 28, 2008 as part of Abbott and Costello: The Complete Universal Pictures Collection.
