= Viva Maria! =

1965 film by Louis Malle

- Theatrical release poster
- Directed by: Louis Malle
- Written by: Louis Malle; Jean-Claude Carrière
- Produced by: Óscar Dancigers
- Starring: Brigitte Bardot; Jeanne Moreau; Paulette Dubost; Gregor von Rezzori; Poldo Bendandi; Claudio Brook; Carlos López Moctezuma; Jonathan Eden; George Hamilton
- Cinematography: Henri Decaë
- Edited by: Kenout Peltier; Suzanne Baron
- Music by: Georges Delerue
- Production companies: Nouvelles Éditions de Films; Les Productions Artistes Associés; Vides Cinematografica
- Distributed by: Les Artistes Associés (France); Dear Film (Italy)
- Release dates: 22 November 1965 (France); 16 February 1966 (Italy)
- Running time: 119 minutes
- Countries: France; Italy
- Languages: French; English; Spanish; German
- Budget: $2.2 million
- Box office: $1.1 million (US and Canada rentals); $4 million (foreign rentals)

Viva Maria! is a 1965 adventure comedy film co-written and directed by Louis Malle, and filmed in Eastman Color. It stars Brigitte Bardot and Jeanne Moreau as two women named Maria who meet and become revolutionaries in the early 20th century. It also stars George Hamilton as Florès, a revolutionary leader. The costumes were by Pierre Cardin.

The film was released in both French and an English-dubbed version.

== Plot ==
In 1907, Marie Fitzgerald O'Malley (Maria II), the Irish-born daughter of a deceased Frenchwoman and an Irish republican anarchist, has assisted her father in conducting bombings against the British government from an early age. While in Central America, Maria II is forced to blow up a bridge on which her father is killed in a shootout with British authorities. The orphaned Maria II escapes capture and seeks refuge in the wagon of Maria I, a French vaudeville performer in a traveling circus troupe. The two Marias eventually bond, and since Maria I's partner has recently committed suicide over a failed romance, they team up for a song-and-dance act called "Maria and Maria", despite Maria II's inexperience as a performer.

During their first performance, Maria II unwittingly invents striptease when her skirt accidentally rips, which turns their stage act into a hugely popular striptease routine. While touring the country, the troupe is horrified to witness a small village being ransacked by the henchmen of Rodríguez, a powerful landowner, whereupon several innocent villagers are murdered and enslaved. After Maria II intervenes by shooting one of the henchmen, the troupe members are imprisoned and sent to Rodríguez's hacienda along with the villagers. While in jail, Maria I meets Florès, a socialist revolutionary fighting to overthrow the dictatorial government of the fictional Central American country of San Miguel, and they quickly fall in love with each other.

The next morning, Rodríguez arrives at his hacienda and summons the Marias to his office, intending to kill them, but the women distract him while the troupe orchestrates an escape. As the troupe flees with Florès, he is shot by one of Rodríguez's henchmen. On his deathbed, Florès urges Maria I to promise to carry on his revolutionary cause, and she agrees. Though initially reluctant to acquiesce to Florès' and Maria I's endeavor, Maria II joins the cause when she comes to the aid of her vulnerable friend. After Maria I inadvertently leads her men into an ambush, and Maria II employs her bombmaking skills to save them, the women gather a peasant army against the forces of Rodríguez, organizing the countryside into a quasi-socialist state.

The Marias' revolutionary activities lead to them becoming venerated like saints, attracting the attention of San Miguel's dictator and the Catholic authorities, who fear the disorder of a revolution and view the townspeople's devotion to the two women as sacrilegious. As they prepare to take the capital city, the Marias are captured by the Father Superior and his churchmen. After a botched attempt by hooded priests to torture them (the Inquisition's equipment is too old to work properly), the Marias are rescued by their victorious army. The dictator, Rodríguez and the Father Superior are all defeated, and the Marias are hailed as revolutionary heroines.

Back in France, the troupe stages a Spanish-language musical retelling of the revolution, with the Marias wearing black wigs.

== Cast ==
- Brigitte Bardot as Marie Fitzgerald O'Malley (Maria II)
- Jeanne Moreau as Maria I
- Paulette Dubost as Mme Diogène
- Claudio Brook as The Great Rodolfo
- Carlos López Moctezuma as Rodríguez
- Poldo Bendandi as Werther
- Gregor von Rezzori as Diogène
- Francisco Reiguera as Father Superior
- Jonathan Eden as Juanito Diogène
- Roberto Pedret as Pablo
- José Ángel Espinosa (credited as José Ángel Espinoza) as the dictator of San Miguel
- George Hamilton as Flores
- Fernando Wagner as Maria II's father (uncredited)

== Production ==
=== Development ===
[W]ith Viva Maria!, which aims at being little more than a fancifully photographed tale of two turn-of-the-century dance-hall girls who cheer up a Latin American revolution, Moreau saw a chance of expressing one of her firmest beliefs. 'Films have never shown the kind of relationship that can exist between two women,' she says. 'Men like to think that women must be constantly jealous of each other, never trusting, never in rapport. That is not true, of course, certainly not today. This film could show that.'

— Time magazine cover story on Jeanne Moreau, 5 March 1965

According to Jeff Stafford of Turner Classic Movies, "Malle's idea [was] to take a buddy movie and subvert it. For inspiration, he instructed Carrière to consider the Gary Cooper – Burt Lancaster relationship in Vera Cruz (1954), which was a favorite Western of the two collaborators. By replacing the traditional male protagonists with two strong females, Viva Maria! not only worked as an amusing gender twist on a popular formula, but was seen in some quarters as a political statement. Malle said German filmmaker Rainer Werner Fassbinder later told him that Viva Maria! fascinated him and his fellow students at Berlin University. Malle recalled, 'It was a time of those radical student movements, and they saw in the heroines the two different approaches to revolution.'"

Malle conceived of the film as "a sort of burlesque boxing match—sexpot v. seductress"; he got the film financed on the condition that Moreau commit to the project.

The male lead was George Hamilton, whom Malle cast on the strength of his performance in Two Weeks in Another Town (1962). Malle said "he was a personal choice and I am happy with him... He's more interested in being in the social columns – I don't understand – when he should be one of the greatest of his generation."

=== Filming ===
Filming began on 18 January 1965. Moreau and Bardot became "like two pals in the army" after 16 weeks of principal photography in Mexico, including Texcoco.

An extra was killed during filming when he fell off an ox cart. Filming was also held up when Bardot fell ill.

The dialogue is in English, French, Spanish, and German, depending on the actor. The French version includes extensive English subtitles.

== Reception ==
In Dallas, Texas, the film was banned for its sexual and anti-Catholic content; the ban was lifted by default in 1968, when the United States Supreme Court struck down the ban and limited the ability of municipalities to ban films for adults in Interstate Circuit, Inc. v. City of Dallas.

In 2010, Viva Maria! was screened at the 21st Ankara International Film Festival as part of a "Power and Rebellion" programme.

=== Box office ===
Viva Maria! recorded 3,450,559 admissions in France. It was the ninth most popular film of 1965 in France, after The Sucker, Goldfinger, Thunderball, Gendarme in New York, Mary Poppins, Fantomas Unleashed, God's Thunder and The Wise Guys. It grossed $875,000 in theatrical rentals in the United States and $5,150,000 in rentals worldwide. This film generated a profit of $2.7 million,in the United Artist profit league for 1966, it finished sixth.

=== Critical response ===
Time called it a "jaunty but slipshod farce"; "Having saddled himself with an idea that often seems too silly for words, Director Malle rides to the rescue with more anti-state, anti-church, antedated spoofery than he can gracefully handle. His rhythm is erratic, as though he were trying to make a movie in five or six different styles at the same time, none wholly his own. But even the deadly slow stretches are redeemed by cameraman Henri Decaë, whose breathtakingly sophisticated photography is a show in itself, imperceptibly shaded as the action moves from lush Rousseau tropics to the cabaret scenes that exude a smoky golden haze in which Moreau and Bardot appear like creatures of Lautrec or Degas, ineffably alluring." According to Variety, the film has "B.B. in her best form since And God Created Woman, and brilliantly matched by Jeanne Moreau. They are backed by a rollicking, comic adventure opus impeccably brought off by director Louis Malle."

In a mixed review, Penelope Houston of Sight and Sound wrote that "there are moments in the film when one might accuse Malle himself of belabouring a few dead horses—echoes of other films, debts to assorted directors which he has not been able fully to pay off in kind: to Ophuls, Renoir again for greasepaint and circuses, the American musical, the Marx Brothers", concluding, "But if there is ever any danger of the film actually melting away as one watches, Malle has his built-in double insurance: viva, in fact, Maria et Maria."

Filmink wrote the film "Vgoes for too long and is misshapen but is full of irreverence and good spirits, not to mention a liberated attitude to sex (the lead girls have passions and aren’t punished for following them) which help the film age well. Bardot is particularly bright and the two stars have an excellent rapport. Photography, costumes and production values are top notch."

=== Accolades ===
Both Moreau and Bardot were nominated for Best Foreign Actress at the 20th British Academy Film Awards; Moreau won the award.

== Home video ==
MGM/UA released Viva Maria! on VHS in February 1994.

The last minute of the film, depicting the women singing a song in Spanish on stage, was cut after the film's New York premiere. MGM Technical Services archivist John Kirk was able to restore this final scene to the LaserDisc release in 1998. The version shown on MGM's This TV cable channel includes the scene.

== Adaptations ==
The film was adapted into a newspaper comic in 1965, drawn by Julio Ribera.

== See also ==
- Bandidas, a 2006 comedy film sometimes compared to Viva Maria!
