= God's Thunder =

1965 film by Denys de La Patellière

Le Tonnerre de Dieu
- Directed by: Denys de La Patellière (as Denys de La Patelliere)
- Written by: Denys de La Patetllère (as Denys de La Patelliere) (adaptation); Pascal Jardin (adaptation); Pascal Jardin (dialogue)
- Screenplay by: Denys de La Patellère (as Denys de La Patelliere); Pascal Jardin
- Based on: Bernard Clavel (novel)
- Produced by: Raymond Danon
- Starring: Jean Gabin; Michèle Mercier
- Cinematography: Walter Wottitz
- Edited by: Claude Durand
- Music by: Georges Garvarentz
- Color process: Black and white
- Production companies: Les Films Copernic; Gloria-Film GmbH; Fida Cinematografica
- Distributed by: Comacico (France); Fida Cinematografica (Italy); Gloria Filmverleih (West Germany)
- Release date: 8 September 1965
- Running time: 91 minutes
- Countries: France; Italy; West Germany
- Language: French
- Box office: 3,593,724 admissions (France)

God's Thunder or Le Tonnerre de Dieu is a 1965 French-Italian-West German comedy-drama film directed by Denys de La Patellière and starring Jean Gabin and Michèle Mercier.

== Plot ==
Upset by his wife's inability to bear him a child, Brassac picks up a prostitute, Simone, in Nantes, the local town, and takes her back home. Although disgusted with Brassac's behaviour, Simone enjoys life on his farm and contrives to heal the rift between Brassac and his wife.

== Cast ==
- Jean Gabin as Léandre Brassac
- Michèle Mercier as Simone Leboucher
- Robert Hossein as Marcel
- Georges Géret as Roger (as Georges Geret)
- Emma Danieli as La dame au teckel (as Emma Danielli)
- Ellen Schwiers as Françoise
- Nino Vingelli as Le patron du café
- Daniel Ceccaldi as Le prêtre
- Louis Arbessier as Bricard, le ministre
- Léa Gray as La taulière
- Danielle Durou as Une fille
- Lydie Balmer as Une fille
- Nicole Beurggrave as Une fille
- Mireille Galot as Une fille
- Paul Pavel as L'ami de Marcel
- Hélène Tossy as La patronne du bistrot
- Lili Palmer as Marie Brassac

== Reception ==
It was the seventh most popular film of 1965 in France, after The Sucker, Goldfinger, Thunderball, Gendarme in New York, Mary Poppins and Fantomas Unleashed.

== See also ==
- List of French films of 1965
