= Bernard Clavel =

French writer

Bernard Charles Henri Clavel
- Born: 29 May 1923; Lons-le-Saunier, France
- Died: 5 October 2010 (aged 87); Grenoble, France
- Occupations: Writer, Journalist, Pastry cook, Social insurance worker
- Writing career
- Language: French
- Years active: 1956–2010
- Genre: Young adult fiction
- Subjects: Humble characters, humanist values, anti-violence, anti-war

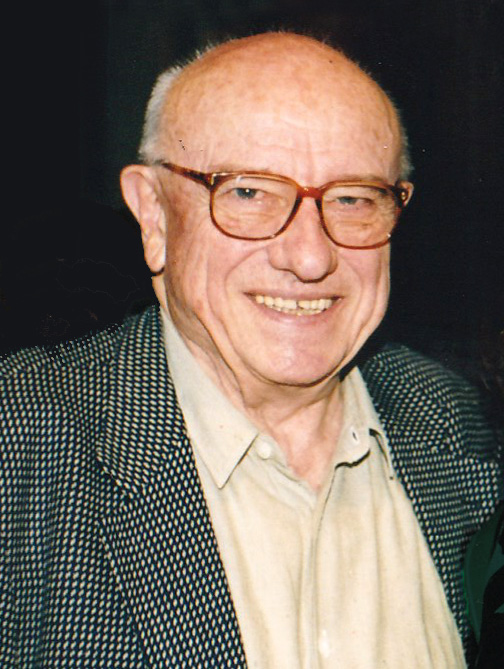
Bernard Clavel at the 1999 International Geography Festival

Bernard Charles Henri Clavel (French pronunciation: [bɛʁnaʁ ʃaʁl ɑ̃ʁi klavɛl]; 29 May 1923 – 5 October 2010) was a French writer.

Clavel was born in Lons-le-Saunier. From a humble background, he was largely self-educated. He began working as a pastry cook apprentice when he was 14 years old. He later had several jobs until he began working as a journalist in the 1950s. After the war, he worked for the social insurance, and he could not dedicate himself to literature until 1964. He lived and worked in many places, and was living in Savoy at the time of his death.

His first novel was L'Ouvrier de la nuit (Night Worker, 1956). He later published works for young people and numerous novels, at times organised into series: La grande patience (The Great Patience, 4 volumes — 1962–1968), Les Colonnes du ciel (Heaven's Pillars, 5 volumes — 1976–1981), or Le Royaume du nord (Northern Kingdom, 6 volumes — 1983–1989).

In his writings, he employed simple language and attached importance to humble characters and to the defence of humanist values by questioning violence and war.

He died in Grenoble.

== Prizes and memberships ==
- Prix Goncourt for Les Fruits de l'hiver: 1968
- Member of Académie Goncourt 1971–1977.
- Member of Coordination française pour la Décennie de la culture de paix et de non-violence.
- Member of Non-Violence XXI group since 2001.

== Partial bibliography ==
- Cargo pour l'enfer, 1993
- Malataverne, 1993
- L'Arbre qui chante
- Les Roses de Verdun
- Collection La Grande Patience
  1. La Maison des autres
  2. Celui qui voulait voir la mer
  3. Le Cœur des vivants
  4. Les Fruits de l'hiver
- Collection Les Colonnes du ciel
  1. La Saison des loups
  2. La Lumière du lac
  3. La Femme de guerre
  4. Marie Bon pain
  5. Compagnons du Nouveau Monde
- Collection Le Royaume du nord
  1. Harricana, 1983
  2. L'Or de la terre, 1984
  3. Miséréré, 1985
  4. Amarok, 1987
  5. L'Angélus du soir, 1988
  6. Maudits sauvages, 1989

== Film adaptations ==
- God's Thunder (1966), Denys de La Patellière, from the book Qui m'emporte.
- Le Voyage du père (1966), Denys de La Patellière.

== Television adaptations ==
- La Maison des autres (1977), Jean-Pierre Marchand Bernard Clavel.
- L'hercule sur la place.
- L'Espagnol (1967), directed by Jean Prat.
- Le Tambour du bief
- Le Silence des armes
- Malataverne
- La Bourelle
- Les colonnes du ciel, adaptation by Gabriel Axel in 5 episodes of 90 minutes.
