= Bud Abbott =

American comedian and actor (1897–1974)

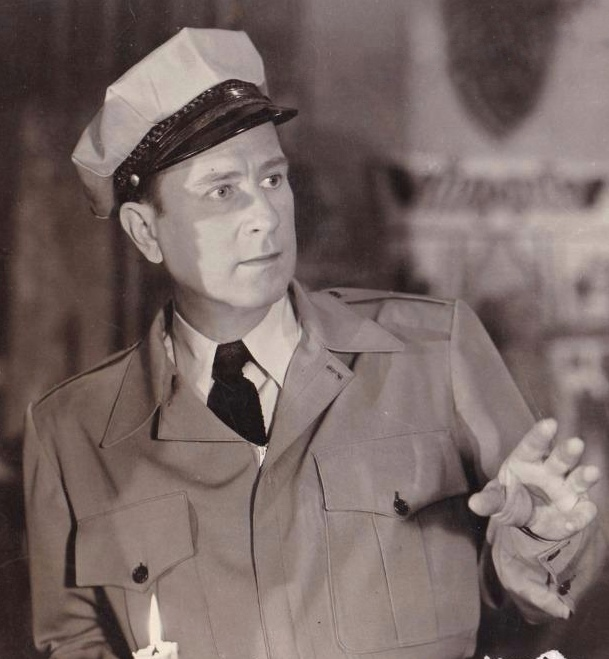
- Abbott in Abbott and Costello Meet Frankenstein (1948)
- Born: William Alexander Abbott; October 2, 1897; Asbury Park, New Jersey, U.S.
- Died: April 24, 1974 (aged 76); Woodland Hills, California, U.S.
- Occupations: Comedian; actor; producer
- Years active: 1924–1968
- Spouse: Betty Smith (m. 1918)
- Children: 2

Signature
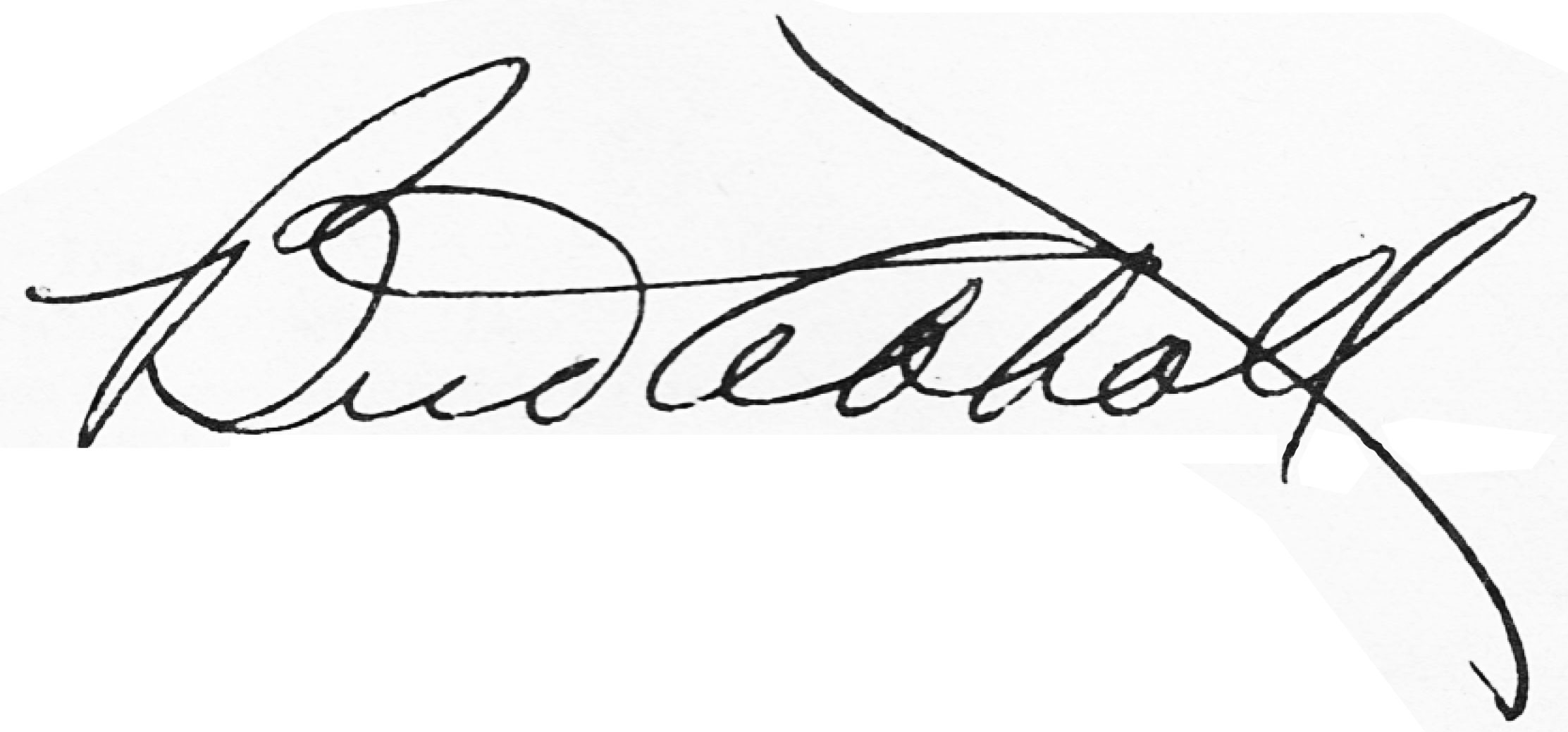

William Alexander "Bud" Abbott (October 2, 1897 (Note: The year of birth has been reported as 1895, 1896, 1897, and 1898 in different sources. The 1895 date was perpetuated by sources copying from earlier incorrect sources. His birth certificate lists October 6, 1897, but his World War I draft card uses October 2, 1897. It is likely that the birth, which occurred on a Saturday, was not registered until the 6th.) – April 24, 1974) was an American comedian, actor and producer, best known as the straight man in the comedy duo Abbott and Costello. With Lou Costello, he performed on stage, radio, film and television, becoming one of the leading Hollywood comedy stars of the 1940s.

Born into a show-business family in Asbury Park, New Jersey, Abbott worked in burlesque theatre management before becoming a performer and producer. He and Costello formally teamed up in 1936, gained national exposure on the Kate Smith Hour radio program in 1938, and appeared on Broadway in The Streets of Paris in 1939. Their film debut in One Night in the Tropics (1940) led to starring roles in Buck Privates (1941), whose success established their partnership at Universal Pictures.

Abbott and Costello made 36 films together between 1940 and 1956, including Hold That Ghost (1941), The Naughty Nineties (1945) and Abbott and Costello Meet Frankenstein (1948). They ranked first among Hollywood box-office stars in 1942 and performed the celebrated baseball routine "Who's on First?". Their success extended to their own radio program, appearances on The Colgate Comedy Hour, and the television sitcom The Abbott and Costello Show (1952–1954).

== Early life ==
Abbott was born in Asbury Park, New Jersey, on October 2, 1897, into a show business family. His parents, Rae Fisher and Harry Abbott, had met while working for the Barnum and Bailey Circus. She was a bareback rider of German Jewish background and he was a concessionaire and forage agent. Bud was the third of the couple's four children. When Bud was a toddler, the family relocated to Harlem, then to the Coney Island section of Brooklyn, and his father became a longtime advance man for the Columbia Burlesque Wheel.

During the summer, when burlesque was on hiatus, his father worked at Dreamland Park in Coney Island. Bud dropped out of grammar school to work at the park. In his teens, he signed on as a cabin boy on a Norwegian steamer, but was soon forced to shovel coal. He worked his way back to the United States a year later.

== Career ==
In his late teens, Abbott began working in the box office of the Casino Theatre in Brooklyn, a burlesque house on the Columbia wheel. He spent the next few years in burlesque box offices, rising to treasurer. In 1918, while working in Washington, D.C., he met and married Jenny Mae Pratt (1902–1981), a burlesque dancer and comedienne who performed as Betty Smith. They remained together until his death 55 years later. Betty performed on the Columbia Wheel, while Bud mostly remained behind the scenes. In 1923, he produced a cut-rate vaudeville tab show called Broadway Flashes, which toured on the small-time Gus Sun circuit. Abbott began performing as a straight man in the show when he could no longer afford to pay one. He continued producing and performing in burlesque shows on the Mutual Burlesque wheel, and as his reputation grew, he began working with veteran comedians like Harry Steppe and Harry Evanson.

=== Lou Costello and Hollywood ===
Abbott crossed paths with Lou Costello in the early 1930s, when Abbott was producing and performing in Minsky's Burlesque shows in New York, and Costello was a rising comic. They worked together for the first time in 1935 at the Eltinge Theatre on 42nd Street, after an illness sidelined Costello's regular partner. They formally teamed up in 1936, and performed together in burlesque, minstrel shows, what was left of vaudeville, and stage shows.

In 1938, they received national exposure as regulars on the Kate Smith Hour radio show, which led to roles in a Broadway musical, The Streets of Paris in 1939. In 1940, Universal signed the team for their first film, One Night in the Tropics. Despite having minor roles, Abbott and Costello stole the film with several classic routines, including an abbreviated version of "Who's on First?" Universal signed the team to a two-picture deal, and the first film, Buck Privates (1941), became a major hit and led to a long-term contract with the studio.

Arthur Lubin, who directed the team's first five starring films, later said: "I don't think there has ever been a finer straight man in the business than Bud Abbott. Lou would go off the script – because he was that clever with lines – and Bud would bring him right back."

During World War II, Abbott and Costello were among the most popular and highest-paid stars in the world. Between 1940 and 1956, they made 36 films and earned a percentage of the profits on each. They were among the Top 10 box office stars from 1941 through 1951, and placed No. 1 in 1942. They also had their own radio program (The Abbott and Costello Show) throughout the 1940s, first on NBC from 1942 to 1947, and from 1947 to 1949 on ABC. During a 35-day tour in the summer of 1942, the team sold $85 million worth of War Bonds.

In the 1950s, they introduced their comedy to live television on The Colgate Comedy Hour, and launched their own half-hour filmed series, The Abbott and Costello Show (1952–54).

=== Strain and split ===
Relations between Abbott and Costello were strained by egos and salary disputes. In burlesque, they split their earnings 60/40, favoring Abbott, because the straight man was always viewed as the more valuable member of the team. This was eventually changed to 50/50, but after a year in Hollywood, Costello insisted on a 40/60 split in his favor. It remained 40/60 for the rest of their careers. Costello also demanded that the team be renamed "Costello and Abbott," but this was rejected by Universal because the studio had been promoting "Abbott and Costello" for years. Abbott's top billing resulted in a "permanent chill" between the two partners, according to Lou's daughter Chris Costello in her biography Lou's on First. Their relationship was further strained by Abbott's alcohol abuse, a habit motivated by his desire to stave off epileptic seizures.

In mid-1945, the comedians were not on speaking terms after Costello fired a maid and Abbott, having no grievance with the maid, hired her. As Costello recalled in 1958: "She went to work for Abbott. I explained to Bud why I let her go, and asked him to fire her, but he wouldn't." Costello refused to speak to Abbott except when they were working. In 1946, the team's box office ranking dropped out of the Top 10 and the studio, with Costello's assent, split the team in character roles in two films: Little Giant and The Time of Their Lives. "Bud didn't like doing them at all," said Abbott's nephew Norman Abbott. "He felt that Lou wanted to go on and be a different kind of comedian, that he didn't want to be a team anymore. So the parts were written that way in couple of pictures, and it didn't work." Abbott resolved their personal situation when he suggested that the team's ongoing plans to build a civic center for underprivileged children be named after Costello's son, who drowned before his first birthday. The Lou Costello Jr. Youth Foundation opened in Los Angeles in 1947 and is still serving the community.

The team's popularity waned in the mid-1950s, and the IRS demanded substantial back taxes, forcing the partners (both of whom had been free spenders and serious gamblers) to sell most of their assets, including the rights to many of their films. When the team's long-term contract with Universal was up in 1954, they demanded more money than the studio was willing to pay, and they were dropped after 14 years at the studio.

In November 1956, Costello was the subject of the Ralph Edwards–produced TV show This Is Your Life. A month later the team opened in Las Vegas. The act went badly. Witnesses differ on exactly what happened (one version has Costello leading a drunk Abbott off the stage), but the accounts agree that Abbott's timing had slowed down noticeably, throwing Costello's responses off and embarrassing him.

Abbott and Costello split in 1957, shortly before Costello appeared on Steve Allen's variety show. Costello made solo appearances on several TV shows and did one film, The Thirty-Foot Bride of Candy Rock (released posthumously in 1959). Costello died on March 3, 1959.

=== Later years ===
Abbott faced financial difficulties in the late 1950s when the IRS disallowed $500,000 in tax exemptions, forcing him to sell his home and come out of semi-retirement.

In 1960, Abbott began performing with a new partner, Candy Candido, to good reviews. But Abbott called it quits, saying, "No one could ever live up to Lou." In 1961, Abbott played a straight role in a dramatic television episode of General Electric Theater titled "The Joke's on Me". In 1962, he was interviewed by NBC's Jack Lescoulie in a nostalgic segment. That year, Abbott was reportedly considered for a cameo in Stanley Kramer's comedy It's a Mad, Mad, Mad, Mad World. In 1964, he suffered the first in a series of strokes and recuperated at the Motion Picture Country Home. The next year, he was filmed on the set of the Elvis Presley movie Frankie and Johnny with Barbara Stanwyck, Frank Sinatra, and other celebrities when Presley donated $50,000 to the Motion Picture Relief Fund to help its $40 million building and endowment drive. In 1967, Abbott provided his own voice for the Hanna-Barbera animated series The Abbott and Costello Cartoon Show. Stan Irwin provided the voice of Costello.

== Personal life ==
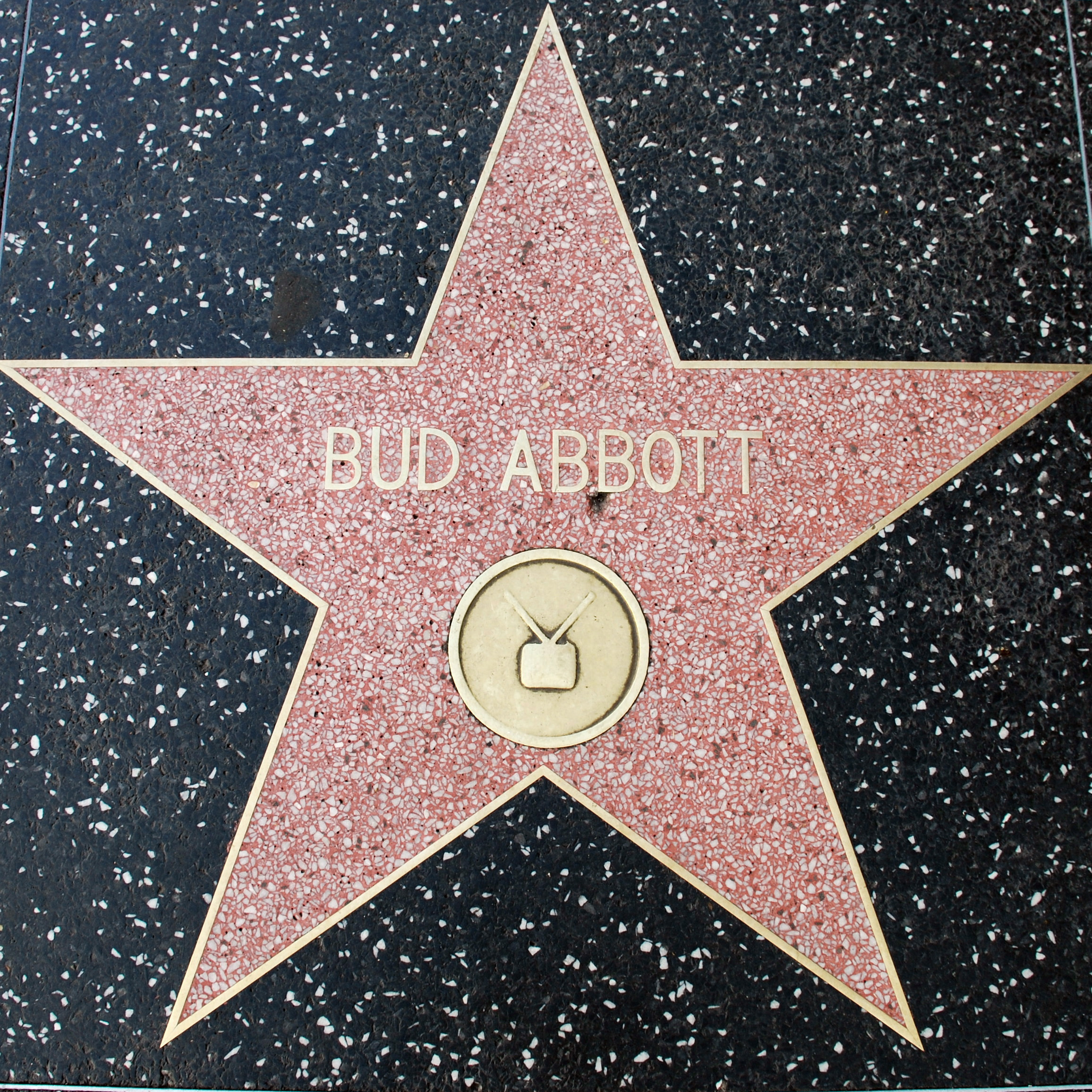
Abbott's star on the Hollywood Walk of Fame for his work in television

Abbott suffered from epilepsy starting from about 1926.

Bud and Betty Abbott were married for 55 years. They adopted two children: Bud Jr. and Rae Victoria "Vickie".

Norman and Betty Abbott, the children of Bud's older sister, Olive, started their careers in Hollywood working behind the scenes on the Abbott and Costello films. Betty became Blake Edwards's longtime script supervisor, and Norman directed many episodic television series, including Leave It to Beaver, The Jack Benny Program, Sanford and Son and Welcome Back, Kotter.

Bud has three stars on the Hollywood Walk of Fame: the radio star is at 6333 Hollywood Boulevard, the motion pictures star at 1611 Vine Street, and the television star at 6740 Hollywood Boulevard.

Abbott was a Freemason via Daylight Lodge No. 525 in Michigan.

== Death ==
Abbott died of cancer at age 76 on April 24, 1974, at his home in Woodland Hills, Los Angeles. He was cremated at Grand View Memorial Park Cemetery in Glendale, California. His ashes were subsequently sprinkled in the Pacific Ocean three miles out from Santa Monica.

His widow, Betty, died on September 12, 1981.

When asked about Abbott shortly after his death, Groucho Marx replied that Abbott was "the greatest straight man that ever lived."

== Honors and awards ==
Abbott and Costello are among the few non-baseball personnel to be memorialized in the Baseball Hall of Fame, although they are not inductees of the Hall itself. A plaque and a gold record of the "Who's On First?" sketch have been on permanent display there since 1956, and the routine has run on an endless video loop in the exhibit area since 1967.

Abbott and Costello each have three stars on the Hollywood Walk of Fame for their work in radio, television and motion pictures.

In 1942, they were voted the country's No. 1 Box Office Stars by exhibitors. They ranked among the Top Ten in 1941, 1942, 1943, 1944, 1948, 1949, 1950 and 1951.

Abbott received the Lifetime Achievement Award for Acting (posthumously) from the Garden State Film Festival in 2006; it was accepted on his behalf by his daughter Vickie Abbott Wheeler.

Abbott is a 2009 inductee of the New Jersey Hall of Fame.

== Filmography ==
Film
Year	Film	Role	Notes
1940	One Night in the Tropics	Abbott	Film Debut/Supporting Role
1941	Buck Privates	Slicker Smith	Starring Role
1941	In the Navy	Smoky Adams	
1941	Hold That Ghost	Chuck Murray	
1941	Keep 'Em Flying	Blackie Benson	
1942	Ride 'Em Cowboy	Duke	
1942	Rio Rita	Doc	
1942	Pardon My Sarong	Algy Shaw	
1942	Who Done It?	Chick Larkin	
1943	It Ain't Hay	Grover Mickridge	
1943	Hit the Ice	Flash Fulton	
1944	In Society	Eddie Harrington	
1944	Lost in a Harem	Peter Johnson	
1945	Here Come the Co-Eds	Slats McCarthy	
1945	The Naughty Nineties	Dexter Broadhurst	
1945	Abbott and Costello in Hollywood	Buzz Kurtis	
1946	Little Giant	John Morrison / Tom Chandler	
1946	The Time of Their Lives	Cuthbert / Dr. Greenway	
1947	Buck Privates Come Home	Slicker Smith	Sequel to Buck Privates
1947	The Wistful Widow of Wagon Gap	Duke Egan	
1948	The Noose Hangs High	Ted Higgins	(Also Producer, uncredited)
1948	Abbott and Costello Meet Frankenstein	Chick Young	
1948	Mexican Hayride	Harry Lambert	
1948	10,000 Kids and a Cop	Himself	Documentary short
1949	Africa Screams	Buzz Johnson	
1949	Abbott and Costello Meet the Killer, Boris Karloff	Casey Edwards	
1950	Abbott and Costello in the Foreign Legion	Bud Jones	
1951	Abbott and Costello Meet the Invisible Man	Bud Alexander	
1951	Comin' Round the Mountain	Al Stewart	
1952	Jack and the Beanstalk	Mr. Dinklepuss	
1952	Lost in Alaska	Tom Watson	
1952	Abbott and Costello Meet Captain Kidd	Rocky Stonebridge	Also Executive Producer
1953	Abbott and Costello Go to Mars	Lester	
1953	Abbott and Costello Meet Dr. Jekyll and Mr. Hyde	Slim	
1955	Abbott and Costello Meet the Keystone Kops	Harry Pierce	
1955	Abbott and Costello Meet the Mummy	Pete Patterson/Abbott	Listed as "Pete Patterson" in the credits but called "Abbott" onscreen
1956	Dance with Me, Henry	Bud Flick	
1965	The World of Abbott and Costello	–	Compilation Film

Television
Year	Title	Role	Notes
1951–1954	The Colgate Comedy Hour	Host	Multiple episodes
1952–1954	The Abbott and Costello Show	Bud Abbott	52 Episodes
1961	General Electric Theater	Ernie Kauffman	Episode: "The Joke's On Me" (04/16/61)
1967–1968	The Abbott and Costello Cartoon Show	Abbott	Voice, 39 Episodes, 156 segments

Other works
Year	Title	Role
1941	Meet the People	Himself
1942	Picture People No. 10: Hollywood at Home	Himself
1949	Screen Snapshots: Motion Picture Mothers, Inc.	Himself
1952	News of the Day	Himself
1954	Screen Snapshots Series 33, No. 10: Hollywood Grows Up	Himself
1955	Toast of the Town	Himself
1956	This Is Your Life	Himself; Episode Lou Costello
1999	The Century: America's Time	Archival footage
1999	ABC 2000: The Millennium	Voice, Archival footage
