= Hit the Ice (film) =

1943 film by Charles Lamont

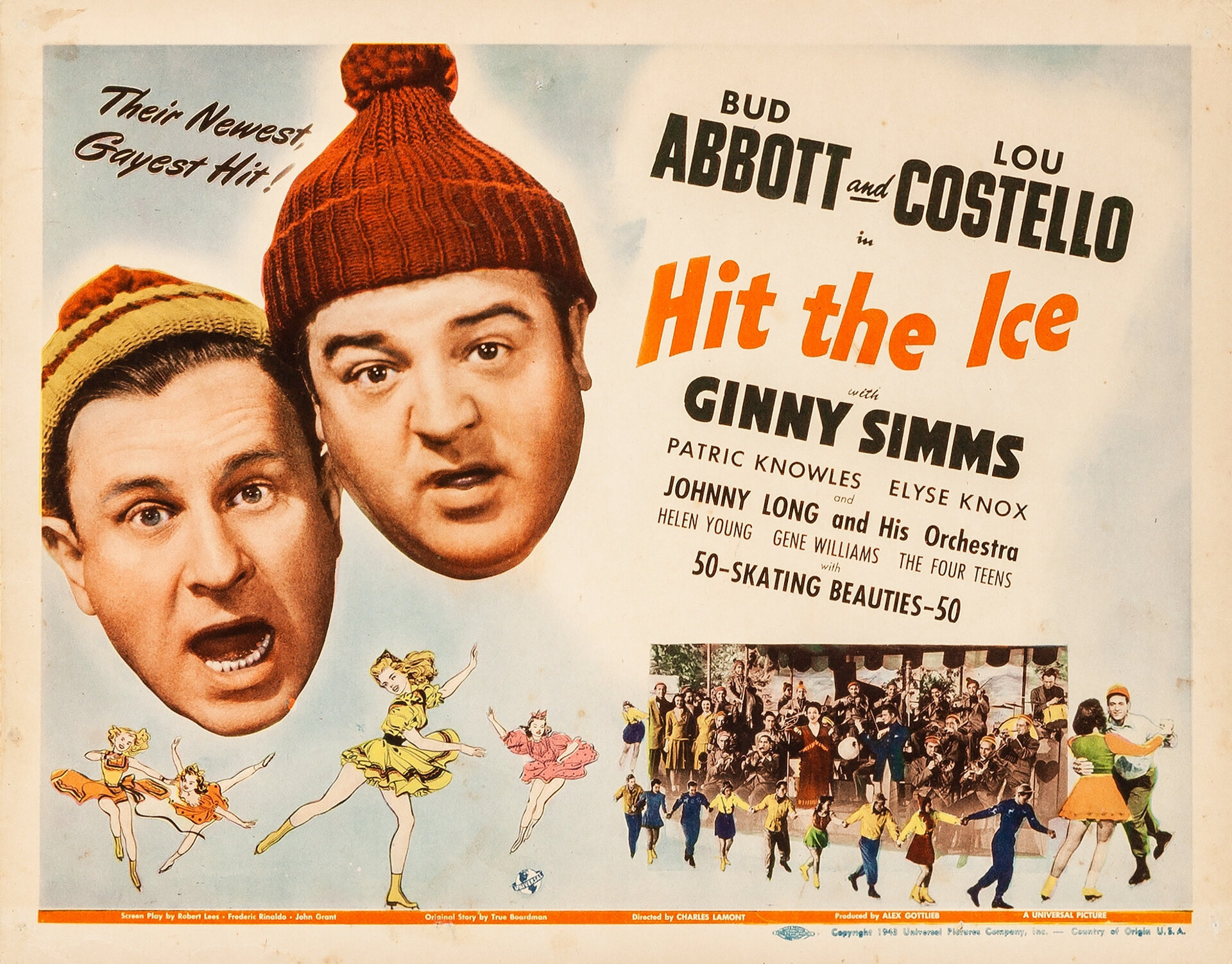
- Lobby card
- Directed by: Charles Lamont
- Written by: True Boardman; Robert Lees; Frederic I. Rinaldo
- Produced by: Alex Gottlieb
- Starring: Bud Abbott; Lou Costello; Ginny Simms; Patric Knowles; Elyse Knox; Sheldon Leonard
- Cinematography: Charles Van Enger
- Edited by: Frank Gross
- Music by: Paul Sawtell
- Distributed by: Universal Pictures
- Release date: June 2, 1943
- Running time: 82 min
- Country: United States
- Language: English
- Box office: $1.8 million (US rentals)

Hit the Ice is a 1943 film starring the comedy team of Abbott and Costello and their first film directed by Charles Lamont. Lamont later directed the team's last few films in the 1950s.

== Plot ==
Two sidewalk photographers, Tubby McCoy and Flash Fulton, aspire to work for the local newspaper. Their childhood friend, Dr. Bill Burns, invites them to come along on a call to a building fire. While attempting to photograph the inferno, Tubby is injured and brought to Burns' hospital. While they are there, Silky Fellowsby, a gangster who is admitted as a patient to establish an alibi for a robbery he is planning, mistake Tubby and Flash for two Detroit hitmen. He expects them to guard the bank's entrance while they rob it, while they mistakenly believe that they are hired to take photographs of the gang as they leave the bank. When the bank is robbed, Tubby and Flash are considered the prime suspects.

Fellowsby heads to a ski resort in Sun Valley to "recuperate", hiring Burns and his nurse to care for him. To clear their names, Tubby and Flash go to the resort, where they are hired as waiters. They attempt to retrieve the stolen cash by blackmailing the gangsters with the bank photographs, which turn out to be worthless since the robbers' faces are not shown. A fight ensues and after a climactic ski chase down the mountain, the gangsters are caught.

== Cast ==
- Bud Abbott as Flash Fulton
- Lou Costello as Tubby McCoy
- Ginny Simms as Marcia Manning
- Patric Knowles as Dr. Bill Elliot (Credits) / Dr. William 'Bill' Burns (in Film)
- Elyse Knox as Peggy Osborne
- Joe Sawyer as Buster (Joseph Sawyer in Credits)
- Marc Lawrence as Phil
- Sheldon Leonard as 'Silky' Fellowsby
- Johnny Long and His Orchestra as themselves

== Production ==
Hit the Ice was put into production 12 days after the team completed It Ain't Hay. It was filmed from November 23 through December 31, 1942. Erle C. Kenton was replaced by Charles Lamont on Hit the Ice after problems with Lou Costello.

On the final day of shooting, the team appeared on their weekly radio show, where they were crowned the nation's top box-office stars for 1942 in a poll of theater exhibitors.

The film contains their routine "All Right", where Costello attempts to impress a girl with his piano playing ability by miming to a phonograph record a hidden Abbott is playing. But Abbott repeatedly falls asleep on the job, leading to some frantic improvisation.

== Rerelease ==
It was re-released by Realart Pictures on a double bill with an earlier Abbott and Costello film, Hold That Ghost, in 1949.

== Home media ==
This film has been released twice on VHS. The first time on VHS and Beta in 1987 and again on VHS in 1991.

This film has been released twice on DVD. The first time, on The Best of Abbott and Costello Volume Two, on May 4, 2004, and again on October 28, 2008, as part of Abbott and Costello: The Complete Universal Pictures Collection.
