= Jean-Paul Savignac =

Jean-Paul Savignac is a translator of Latin, Greek, and Gaulish. He has written three papers on the Gaulish language. He has also written a French-Gaulish dictionary.

== Biography ==
He attended high school at Lycée Buffon in Paris. He pursued higher education at the Sorbonne. As a professor of classical literature, he translated works from Greek and Latin and wrote several books on the Gaulish language. He is also the author of a collection of poems in that language, Le Chant de l'initié.

He is an Officer of the Order of Academic Palms, a member of the Société de Mythology in France, the Association des Amis de Jean Giono, and the French PEN Club. He writes for various literary journals, appears on radio and television programs, and gives numerous lectures.

== Bibliography ==
- Œuvres complètes de Pindare (traduction), 1990. Réédition Collection Minos.
- Les Gaulois. Leurs écrits retrouvés, rassemblés, traduits et commentés. "Merde à César". "Cecos ac Caesar", Paris, éditions de la Différence, 1994 (2nd ed. 2000).
- Le chant de l'initié et autres poèmes gaulois, Paris, éditions de la Différence, 2000.
- Oracles de Delphes, Paris, éditions de la Différence, 2002.
- Eschyle, Prométhée enchainé (translation), Belin, 2004.
- Dictionnaire français-gaulois, Paris, éditions de la Différence, 2004.
- Le Mythe antique : Pourpre et ors, Paris, éditions de la Différence, 2006
- Bellina la Guerrière et l'oracle de Lutèce, Paris, Fayard, 2009
- Alésia, Paris, éditions de la Différence, 2012.
