= Doctor Zhivago (film) =

1965 epic film by David Lean

- Theatrical release poster design by Tom Jung
- Directed by: David Lean
- Screenplay by: Robert Bolt
- Based on: Doctor Zhivago by Boris Pasternak
- Produced by: Carlo Ponti
- Starring: Geraldine Chaplin; Julie Christie; Tom Courtenay; Alec Guinness; Siobhán McKenna; Ralph Richardson; Omar Sharif; Rod Steiger; Rita Tushingham
- Cinematography: Freddie Young
- Edited by: Norman Savage
- Music by: Maurice Jarre
- Production companies: Carlo Ponti Productions; Metro-Goldwyn-Mayer
- Distributed by: Metro-Goldwyn-Mayer
- Release dates: 22 December 1965 (United States); 26 April 1966 (United Kingdom); 10 December 1966 (Italy)
- Running time: 193 minutes
- Countries: United Kingdom; Italy; United States
- Language: English
- Budget: $11 million
- Box office: $111.7 million (US/Canada); 248.2 million tickets (worldwide)

Doctor Zhivago (/ʒɪˈvɑːɡoʊ/) is a 1965 epic historical romance film directed by David Lean with a screenplay by Robert Bolt, based on the 1957 novel by Boris Pasternak. The story is set in Russia during World War I and the Russian Civil War. The film stars Omar Sharif in the title role as Yuri Zhivago, a married physician and poet whose life is altered by the Russian Revolution and subsequent civil war, and Julie Christie as his lover Lara Antipova. Geraldine Chaplin, Tom Courtenay, Rod Steiger, Alec Guinness, Ralph Richardson, Siobhán McKenna, and Rita Tushingham play supporting roles.

Although immensely popular in the West, Pasternak's book was banned in the Soviet Union for decades. As the film could not be made there, it was instead filmed mostly in Spain. It was an international co-production between Metro-Goldwyn-Mayer and Italian producer Carlo Ponti.

Contemporary critics were critical of its length at over three hours and claimed that it trivialized history, but acknowledged the intensity of the love story and the film's treatment of human themes. At the 38th Academy Awards, Doctor Zhivago was nominated for ten Oscars (including Best Picture) and won five: Best Adapted Screenplay, Original Score, Cinematography, Art Direction, and Costume Design. It also won five awards at the 23rd Golden Globe Awards including Best Motion Picture.

As of 2022, it is the ninth highest-grossing film worldwide after adjusting for inflation. In 1998, it was ranked 39th by the American Film Institute on their 100 Years... 100 Movies list, and by the British Film Institute in 1999 as the 27th greatest British film ever.

== Plot ==
=== Part one ===
Lieutenant General Yevgraf Zhivago searches for the daughter of his half-brother Dr. Yuri Zhivago and Larissa "Lara" Antipova. Yevgraf believes a young dam worker, Tanya Komarova, may be his niece and explains to her why.

The story flashes back to decades ago. At his mother's burial, the orphaned child Yuri, owning only an inherited balalaika, was taken by family friends Alexander and Anna Gromeko to Moscow. In 1913, Zhivago, now a doctor and poet, becomes engaged to the Gromekos' daughter Tonya after her schooling in Paris.

Meanwhile, 17-year-old Lara is seduced by her mother's much older friend/lover, the well-connected Victor Komarovsky. Lara's friend, the idealistic Pasha Antipov, who wishes to marry her, is wounded by mounted police at a peaceful demonstration. Lara treats Pasha's wound, and hides a gun he picked up.

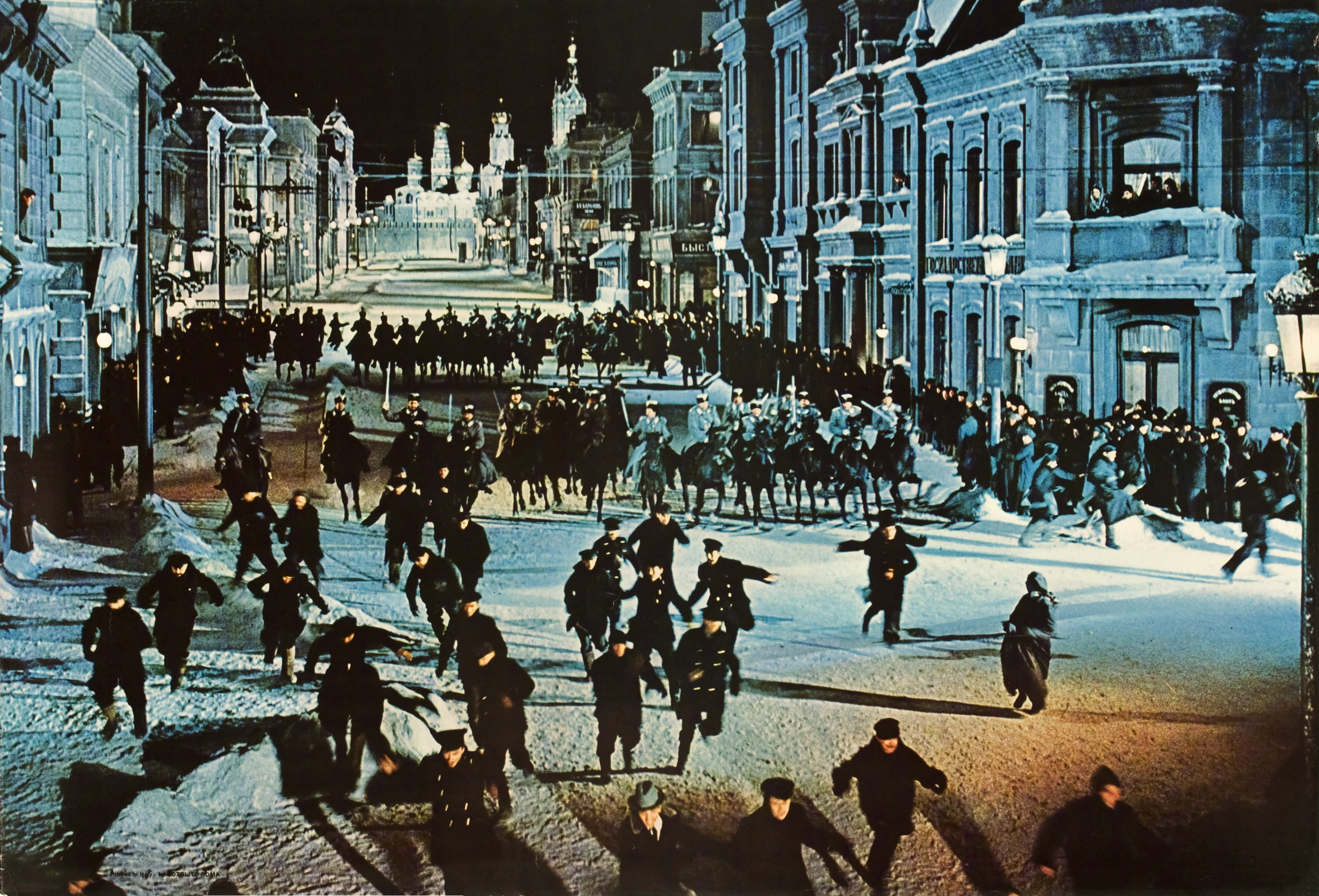
Tsarist dragoons attack a peaceful demonstration

Discovering Lara's relationship with Komarovsky, her mother attempts suicide. Komarovsky attempts to dissuade Lara from marrying Pasha. She refuses and he rapes her. A traumatised Lara later follows Komarovsky to a party, shoots him in the arm, and is escorted out by Pasha. Pasha marries her, despite now knowing about her relationship with Komarovsky. They leave Moscow.

During World War I, Yuri, now married to Tonya, becomes a battlefield doctor. Pasha joins up, but is reported missing. Lara enlists as a nurse to search for him and encounters Zhivago. For six months, they serve at a field hospital, as unrest grows in Russia after exiled Vladimir Lenin returns. The two fall in love, but Zhivago remains faithful to Tonya.

After Russia leaves the war, Yuri returns to Tonya, their son Sasha and the widowed Alexander Gromeko in their Moscow house, which was confiscated by the Soviet government and now houses many other people. Yevgraf, now a Cheka officer, tells Yuri his poems have been condemned as anti-communist. Yevgraf provides documents so the family can travel to the Gromekos' country home, "Varykino", in the Urals near Yuriatin. Their heavily guarded train travels through contested territory where Bolshevik commander Strelnikov is fighting anti-communist White forces.

=== Part two ===
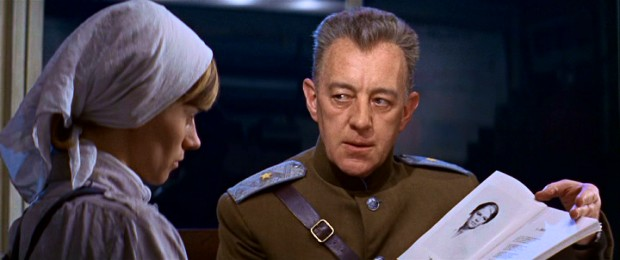
Alec Guinness as Yevgraf and Rita Tushingham as Tanya

The train stops near Strelnikov's armoured train. Yuri gets out, is captured and taken to Strelnikov, whom Yuri recognizes as Pasha. Strelnikov mentions that Lara lives in Yuriatin, now White-occupied. Strelnikov lets Zhivago return to his train. The family find the main house at Varykino sealed up by the Bolsheviks; they settle into a neighbouring cottage. In Yuriatin, Yuri sees Lara, and they begin an affair. When Tonya is about to give birth to a second child, Yuri breaks off with Lara but is forcibly enlisted by Communist partisans.

After two years, Yuri deserts and returns to Yuriatin. Lara says Tonya contacted her while searching for Yuri. Leaving his belongings with Lara, she returned to Moscow. Tonya later sent Lara a sealed letter for Yuri. Tonya had borne a daughter, and she, her father, and two children are living in Paris following deportation.

Yuri and Lara become lovers again but Komarovsky arrives. Cheka agents have been watching them due to Lara's marriage to Strelnikov. Komarovsky offers them help escaping Russia, but they refuse, instead going to Varykino, and hiding in the main house. Yuri begins the "Lara" poems, which will bring him fame but government disapproval. Komarovsky arrives with troops. Recently appointed as a Far Eastern Republic official, he says the Cheka allowed Lara to remain in the area only to lure Strelnikov. He was subsequently captured five miles away and committed suicide on his way to execution by grabbing a guard's gun so they now intend to arrest Lara. Komarovsky's offer of safe passage is accepted, but once Lara is on her way, Yuri does not follow. On the train, Lara tells Komarovsky she is pregnant by Yuri.

Years later, Yevgraf finds a Moscow medical job for his now frail half-brother. Yuri sees Lara, or someone who looks like Lara, in the street but suffers a fatal heart attack before reaching her. At Yuri's funeral, Lara asks Yevgraf for help finding her daughter by Yuri, who vanished during the civil war. Yevgraf helps her search the orphanages, in vain. Lara then disappears and Yevgraf believes she died in a gulag.

Yevgraf believes that Tanya Komarova is Yuri and Lara's daughter; she remains unconvinced. Asked how she became lost, Tanya answers that her "father" (Komarovsky) let go of her hand when they were running from bombardment. Yevgraf responds that a real father would not have let go. Tanya promises to consider Yevgraf's words. Her boyfriend David arrives, and she leaves with him. Yevgraf notices Tanya carries a balalaika. He asks if she can play, and David replies, "She's an artist!", and says she is untrained. Yevgraf responds, "Ah... then it's a gift!"

== Cast ==
- Geraldine Chaplin as Tonya Gromeko
- Julie Christie as Larissa Fyodorovna "Lara" Antipova
- Tom Courtenay as Pavel "Pasha" Antipov / Strelnikov
- Alec Guinness as Yevgraf Andreyevich Zhivago
- Siobhán McKenna as Anna Gromeko
- Ralph Richardson as Alexander Maximovich Gromeko
- Omar Sharif as Yuri Andreyevich Zhivago
  - Tarek Sharif as Yuri at 8 years old
- Rod Steiger as Victor Ippolitovich Komarovsky
- Rita Tushingham as Tanya Komarova
- Adrienne Corri as Amelia
- Bernard Kay as Kuril
- Geoffrey Keen as Professor Boris Kurt
- Klaus Kinski as Kostoyed Amoursky
- Jeffrey Rockland as Sasha Yurievich Zhivago
- Gérard Tichy as Liberius Mikulitsyn
- Noel Willman as Razin
- Jack MacGowran as Petya
- Mark Eden as Bakunin

== Production ==
=== Background ===
Boris Pasternak's novel was published in the West amidst celebration and controversy. Pasternak began writing it in 1945, and was giving private readings of excerpts as early as 1946. However, the novel was not completed until 1956. The book had to be smuggled out of the Soviet Union by an Italian called D'Angelo to be delivered to Giangiacomo Feltrinelli, a left-wing Italian publisher who published it shortly thereafter, in 1957. Helped by a Soviet campaign against the novel, it became a sensation throughout the non-communist world. It spent 26 weeks atop The New York Times best-seller list.

Pasternak was awarded the 1958 Nobel Prize for Literature. While the citation noted his poetry, it was speculated that the prize was mainly for Doctor Zhivago, (Note: The Swedish academy gave Pasternak the prize "for his important achievement both in contemporary lyrical poetry and in the field of the great Russian epic tradition"; according to his niece Ann, the last phrase "clearly" refers to Doctor Zhivago.) which the Soviet government saw as an anti-Soviet work, thus interpreting the award of the Nobel Prize as a gesture hostile to the Soviet Union. A target of the Soviet government's fervent campaign to label him a traitor, Pasternak felt compelled to refuse the Prize. The situation became an international cause célèbre and made Pasternak a Cold War symbol of resistance to Soviet communism.

=== Development and casting ===
The film treatment by David Lean was proposed for various reasons. Pasternak's novel had been an international success, and producer Carlo Ponti was interested in adapting it as a vehicle for his wife, Sophia Loren. Lean, coming off the huge success of Lawrence of Arabia (1962), wanted to make a more intimate, romantic film to balance the action- and adventure-oriented tone of his previous film. One of the first actors signed onboard was Omar Sharif, who had played Lawrence's right-hand man Sherif Ali in Lawrence of Arabia. Sharif loved the novel, and when he heard Lean was making a film adaptation, he requested to be cast in the role of Pasha (which ultimately went to Tom Courtenay).

Sharif was quite surprised when Lean suggested that he play Zhivago. Peter O'Toole, star of Lawrence of Arabia, was Lean's original choice for Zhivago, but turned the part down; Max von Sydow and Paul Newman were also considered. Rod Taylor was offered the role but turned it down. Michael Caine tells in his autobiography that he also read for Zhivago and participated in the screen shots with Christie, but (after watching the results with David Lean) was the one who suggested Omar Sharif. Rod Steiger was cast as Komarovsky after Marlon Brando and James Mason turned the part down. Audrey Hepburn was considered for Tonya, and Robert Bolt lobbied for Albert Finney to play Pasha.

Lean convinced Ponti that Loren was not right for the role of Lara, saying she was "too tall" (and confiding in screenwriter Robert Bolt that he could not accept Loren as a virgin for the early parts of the film), and Jeanne Moreau, Yvette Mimieux, Sarah Miles and Jane Fonda were considered for the role. Ultimately, Julie Christie was cast based on her appearance in Billy Liar (1963) and the recommendation of Jack Cardiff, who directed her in Young Cassidy (1965). Sharif's son Tarek was cast as the young Zhivago, and Sharif directed his son as a way to get closer to his character.

=== Filming ===
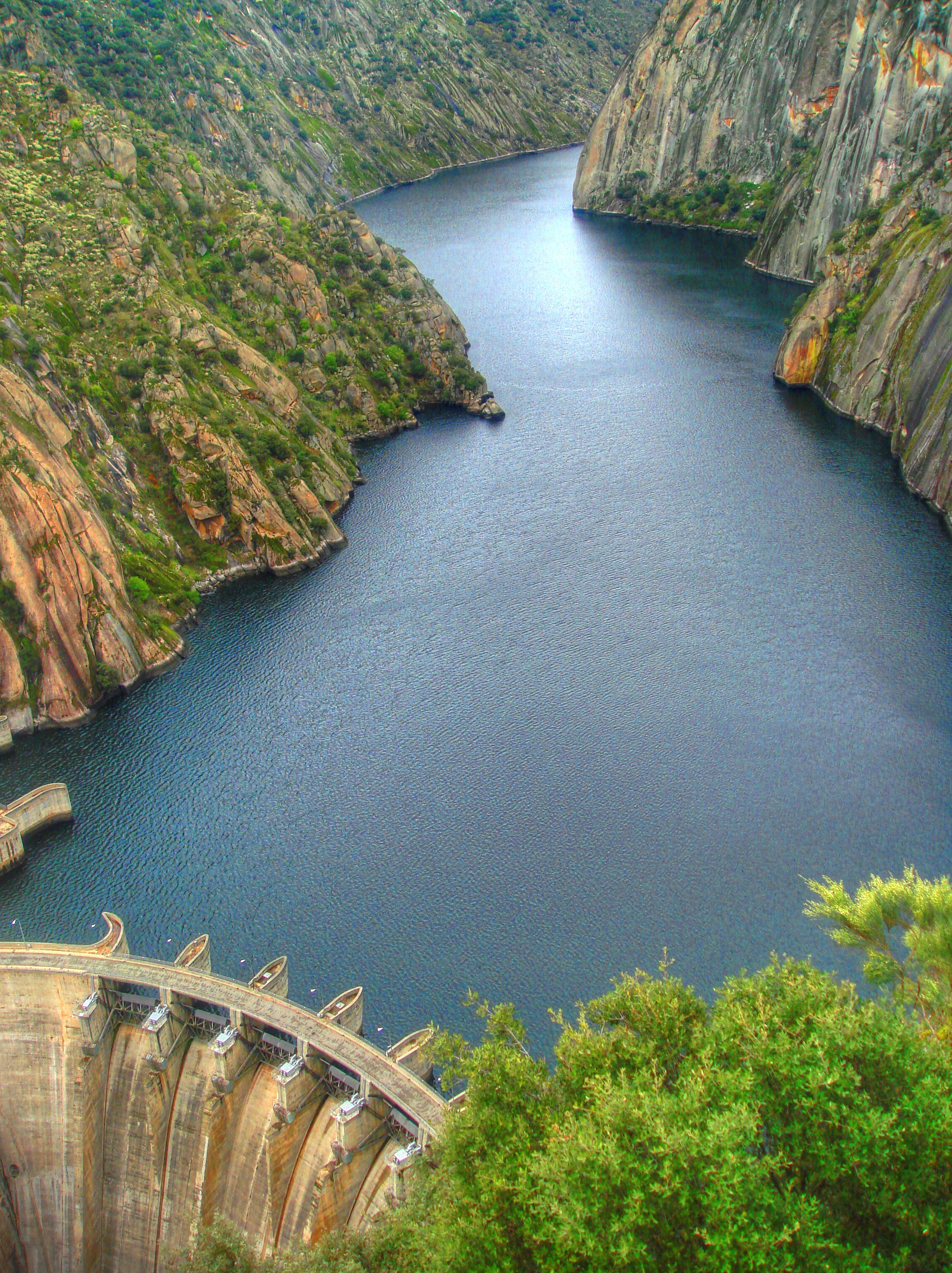
The opening and closing scenes were filmed on location at the Aldeadávila Dam between Spain and Portugal.

Lean's experience filming a part of Lawrence of Arabia in Spain, access to CEA Studios, and the guarantee of snow in some parts of Spain led to his choosing the country as the primary location for filming. However, the weather predictions failed and David Lean's team experienced Spain's warmest winter in 50 years. As a result, some scenes were filmed in interiors with artificial snow made with dust from a nearby marble quarry. The team filmed some locations with natural heavy snow, such as the snowy landscape in Strelnikov's train sequence, somewhere in Campo de Gómara near Soria.

Nicolas Roeg was the original director of photography and worked on some scenes but, after an argument with Lean, he left and was replaced by Freddie Young. Principal photography began on 28 December 1964, and production ended on 8 October the following year; the entire Moscow set was built from scratch outside Madrid. Most of the scenes covering Zhivago's and Lara's service in World War I were filmed in Soria, as was the Varykino estate. The "ice-palace" at Varykino was filmed in Soria as well, a house filled with frozen beeswax. The charge of the partisans across the frozen lake was also filmed in Spain; a cast iron sheet was placed over a dried river-bed, and fake snow (mostly marble dust) was added on top. Some of the winter scenes were filmed in summer with warm temperatures, sometimes of up to 25 °C (77 °F). Other locations include Madrid-Delicias railway station in Madrid and the Moncayo Range. The initial and final scenes were shot at the Aldeadávila Dam between Spain and Portugal. Although uncredited, most of those scenes were shot on the Portuguese side of the river, overlooking the Spanish side.

Other winter sequences, mostly landscape scenes and Yuri's escape from the partisans, were filmed in Finland near Joensuu. Winter scenes of the family travelling to Yuriatin by rail were filmed in Canada. The locomotives seen in the film are Spanish locomotives like the RENFE Class 240 (ex-1400 MZA), and Strelnikov's armoured train is towed by the RENFE Class 141F Mikado locomotive.

One train scene became notorious for the supposed fate that befell Lili Muráti, a Hungarian actress, who slipped clambering onto a moving train. Although she fell under the wagon, she escaped serious injury and returned to work within three weeks (and did not perish or lose a limb). Lean appears to have used part of her accident in the film's final cut.

== Release ==
=== Theatrical ===
Released theatrically on 22 December 1965, the film went on to gross $111.7 million in the United States and Canada across all of its releases, becoming the second highest-grossing film of 1965. It is the eighth highest-grossing film in history, adjusted for inflation. The film sold an estimated 124.1 million tickets in the United States and Canada, equivalent to $1.1 billion adjusted for inflation as of 2018.

In addition, it is the ninth highest-grossing film worldwide after adjusting for inflation. The film sold an estimated 248.2 million tickets worldwide, equivalent to $2.1 billion adjusted for inflation as of 2014. It is the most popular film of all time in Italy with 22.9 million admissions. It was the highest-grossing film in Germany with theatrical rentals of 39 million Deutschmarks from 12.75 million admissions and also the most popular film of all time in Switzerland with over 1 million admissions. In the United Kingdom, it was the most popular film of the year with 11.2 million admissions and was the third-highest-grossing film of all time in Australia with theatrical rentals of A$2.5 million. The film's 2015 limited re-release in the United Kingdom grossed $138,493.

In May 1966, the film was entered into competition at the 1966 Cannes Film Festival.

=== Home media ===
On 24 September 2002, the 35th Anniversary version of Doctor Zhivago was issued on DVD (two-disc set), and another Anniversary Edition in 2010 on Blu-ray (a three-disc set that includes a book). Doctor Zhivago will be released on 4K Ultra Blu-ray on December 1, 2026.

== Critical reception ==
Upon its initial release, Doctor Zhivago was criticized for its romanticization of the revolution. Bosley Crowther of The New York Times felt that the film's focus on the love story between Zhivago and Lara trivialized the events of the Russian Revolution and the resulting Russian Civil War, but was impressed by the film's visuals. Also critical of the film was The Guardian's Richard Roud, who wrote: "In the film the revolution is reduced to a series of rather annoying occurrences; getting firewood, finding a seat on a train, and a lot of nasty proles being tiresome. Whatever one thinks of the Russian Revolution it was certainly more than a series of consumer problems. At least it was to Zhivago himself. The whole point of the book was that even though Zhivago disapproved of the course the revolution took, he had approved of it in principle. Had he not, there would have been no tragedy." Brendan Gill of The New Yorker called the film "a grievous disappointment ... these able actors have been given almost nothing to do except wear costumes and engage in banal small talk. Doctor Zhivago is one of the stillest motion pictures of all time, and an occasional bumpy train ride or crudely inserted cavalry charge only points up its essential immobility." The Monthly Film Bulletin wrote: "The best one can say of Doctor Zhivago is that it is an honest failure. Boris Pasternak's sprawling, complex, elusive novel is held together by its unity of style, by the driving force of its narrative, by the passionate voice of a poet who weaves a mass of diverse characters into a single tapestry. And this is precisely what David Lean's film lacks. Somewhere in the two years of the film's making the spirit of the novel has been lost."

Among the positive reviews, Time magazine called the film "literate, old-fashioned, soul-filling and thoroughly romantic". Arthur D. Murphy of Variety declared, "The sweep and scope of the Russian revolution, as reflected in the personalities of those who either adapted or were crushed, has been captured by David Lean in 'Doctor Zhivago,' frequently with soaring dramatic intensity. Director [David Lean] has accomplished one of the most meticulously designed and executed films—superior in several visual respects to his 'Lawrence of Arabia.'" Philip K. Scheuer of the Los Angeles Times called the film "as throat-catchingly magnificent as the screen could be, the apotheosis of the cinema as art. With Spain and Finland doubling, absolutely incredibly, for Moscow and the Urals in all seasons, we are transplanted to another land and time ... if you will brace yourself for an inordinately lengthy session—intermission notwithstanding—in a theatre seat, I can promise you some fine film-making." Richard L. Coe of The Washington Post called it "Visually beautiful and finely acted." He identified the film's length as its "greatest drawback" but wrote that "we weary of the long train ride or become impatient with individual scenes, but, thinking back on them, we perceive their proper intent." Clifford Terry of the Chicago Tribune wrote that director David Lean and screenwriter Robert Bolt "have fashioned out of a rambling book, a well controlled film highlighted by excellent acting and brilliant production."

Reviewing it for its 30th anniversary, film critic Roger Ebert regarded it as "an example of superb old-style craftsmanship at the service of a soppy romantic vision", and wrote that "the story, especially as it has been simplified by Lean and his screenwriter, Robert Bolt, seems political in the same sense Gone with the Wind is political, as spectacle and backdrop, without ideology", concluding that the political content is treated mostly as a "sideshow". Geoffrey Macnab of The Independent reviewed the film for its 50th anniversary and noted director David Lean's "extraordinary artistry" but found the film bordering on "kitsch". Macnab also felt that the musical score by Maurice Jarre still stood up but criticised the English accents.

On Rotten Tomatoes the film has an approval rating 84% based on 50 reviews, with an average rating of 7.60/10. The critical consensus reads: "It may not be the best of David Lean's epics, but Dr. Zhivago is still brilliantly photographed and sweepingly romantic."

In 2013, Jennifer Lee and Chris Buck cited Doctor Zhivago as an influence on the 2013 Disney animated film Frozen. In 2016, the Directors Guild of America ranked the film 48th on its list of the 80 best-directed films since the Guild’s founding in 1936.

The February 2020 issue of New York Magazine lists Doctor Zhivago as among "The Best Movies That Lost Best Picture at the Oscars."

=== Awards and nominations ===
Both Doctor Zhivago and The Sound of Music received the most nominations at the 38th Academy Awards (ten each). Both films won five Academy Awards apiece, but The Sound of Music won Best Picture and Best Director. Julie Christie was not nominated for her role in Doctor Zhivago, but won Best Actress in the same year, for her performance in Darling.

Award	Category	Nominee(s)	Result	Ref.
Academy Awards	Best Picture	Carlo Ponti	Nominated	
Academy Awards	Best Director	David Lean	Nominated	
Academy Awards	Best Supporting Actor	Tom Courtenay	Nominated	
Academy Awards	Best Screenplay – Based on Material from Another Medium	Robert Bolt	Won	
Academy Awards	Best Art Direction – Color	Art Direction: John Box and Terence Marsh; Set Decoration: Dario Simoni	Won	
Academy Awards	Best Cinematography – Color	Freddie Young	Won	
Academy Awards	Best Costume Design – Color	Phyllis Dalton	Won	
Academy Awards	Best Film Editing	Norman Savage	Nominated	
Academy Awards	Best Music Score – Substantially Original	Maurice Jarre	Won	
Academy Awards	Best Sound	A. W. Watkins and Franklin Milton	Nominated	
British Academy Film Awards	Best Film from any Source	David Lean	Nominated	
British Academy Film Awards	Best British Actor	Ralph Richardson (also for Khartoum and The Wrong Box)	Nominated	
British Academy Film Awards	Best British Actress	Julie Christie (also for Fahrenheit 451)	Nominated	
British Society of Cinematographers Awards	Best Cinematography in a Theatrical Feature Film	Freddie Young	Won	
Cannes Film Festival	Palme d'Or	David Lean	Nominated	
David di Donatello Awards	Best Foreign Production	David Lean	Won	
David di Donatello Awards	Best Foreign Director	David Lean	Won	
David di Donatello Awards	Best Foreign Actress	Julie Christie	Won (Note: Tied with Elizabeth Taylor for The Taming of the Shrew.)	
Golden Globe Awards	Best Motion Picture – Drama		Won	
Golden Globe Awards	Best Actor in a Motion Picture – Drama	Omar Sharif	Won	
Golden Globe Awards	Best Director – Motion Picture	David Lean	Won	
Golden Globe Awards	Best Screenplay – Motion Picture	Robert Bolt	Won	
Golden Globe Awards	Best Original Score – Motion Picture	Maurice Jarre	Won	
Golden Globe Awards	Most Promising Newcomer – Female	Geraldine Chaplin	Nominated	
Golden Screen Awards			Won	
Grammy Awards	Album of the Year	Doctor Zhivago – Maurice Jarre	Nominated	
Grammy Awards	Best Instrumental Performance (Other Than Jazz)	Doctor Zhivago – Maurice Jarre	Nominated	
Grammy Awards	Best Original Score Written for a Motion Picture or Television Show	Doctor Zhivago – Maurice Jarre	Won	
Laurel Awards	Top Drama		Won	
Laurel Awards	Top Male Dramatic Performance	Omar Sharif	Nominated	
Laurel Awards	Top Male Supporting Performance	Tom Courtenay	Nominated	
National Board of Review Awards	Top Ten Films		3rd Place	
National Board of Review Awards	Best Actress	Julie Christie (also for Darling)	Won	
New York Film Critics Circle Awards	Best Director	David Lean	Nominated	
Online Film & Television Association Awards	Film Hall of Fame: Productions		Inducted	
People's Choice Awards	Favorite All-Time Motion Picture Song	"Somewhere My Love (Lara's Theme)"	Won	

=== American Film Institute recognition ===
- AFI's 100 Years... 100 Movies – No. 39
- AFI's 100 Years... 100 Passions – No. 7

== See also ==
- BFI Top 100 British films

== Books Cited ==
- Maxford, Howard (2000). David Lean. Batsford Books. ISBN 184994248X.
