= National Board of Review Awards 1965 =

Annual US film awards ceremony

37th National Board of Review Awards

January 9, 1966

The 37th National Board of Review Awards were announced on January 9, 1966.

== Top Ten Films ==
1. The Eleanor Roosevelt Story
2. The Agony and the Ecstasy
3. Doctor Zhivago
4. Ship of Fools
5. The Spy Who Came in from the Cold
6. Darling
7. The Greatest Story Ever Told
8. A Thousand Clowns
9. The Train
10. The Sound of Music

== Top Foreign Films ==
1. Juliet of the Spirits
2. The Overcoat
3. La Bohème
4. La Tia Tula
5. Gertrud

== Winners ==
- Best Film: The Eleanor Roosevelt Story
- Best Foreign Film: Juliet of the Spirits
- Best Actor: Lee Marvin (Cat Ballou, Ship of Fools)
- Best Actress: Julie Christie (Doctor Zhivago, Darling)
- Best Supporting Actor: Harry Andrews (The Agony and the Ecstasy, The Hill)
- Best Supporting Actress: Joan Blondell (The Cincinnati Kid)
- Best Director: John Schlesinger (Darling)
