= 23rd Golden Globe Awards =

Film award ceremony in 1966

- Date: February 28, 1966
- Site: Cocoanut Grove, Ambassador Hotel, Los Angeles, California

Highlights
- Best Film: Drama: Doctor Zhivago
- Best Film: Musical or Comedy: The Sound of Music
- Best Television show: The Man from U.N.C.L.E.

The 23rd Golden Globe Awards, honoring the best in film and television for 1965, were held on February 28, 1966.

== Winners and nominees ==
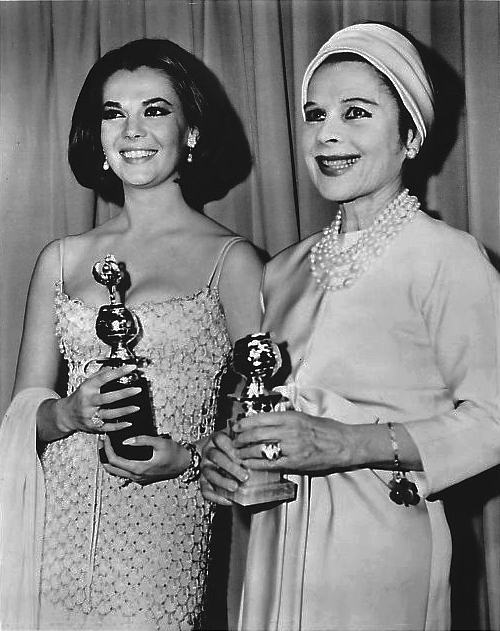
Natalie Wood and Ruth Gordon at the 23rd Golden Globes

=== Film ===
Best Motion Picture
Best Film - Drama	Best Film - Comedy or Musical
Doctor Zhivago; The Collector; The Flight of the Phoenix; A Patch of Blue; Ship of Fools	The Sound of Music; Cat Ballou; The Great Race; Those Magnificent Men in their Flying Machines; A Thousand Clowns
Best Performance in a Motion Picture – Drama
Actor	Actress
Omar Sharif - Doctor Zhivago; Rex Harrison - The Agony and the Ecstasy; Sidney Poitier - A Patch of Blue; Rod Steiger - The Pawnbroker; Oskar Werner - Ship of Fools	Samantha Eggar - The Collector; Julie Christie - Darling; Elizabeth Hartman - A Patch of Blue; Simone Signoret - Ship of Fools; Maggie Smith - Othello
Best Performance in a Motion Picture – Comedy or Musical
Actor	Actress
Lee Marvin - Cat Ballou; Jack Lemmon - The Great Race; Jerry Lewis - Boeing Boeing; Jason Robards - A Thousand Clowns; Alberto Sordi - Those Magnificent Men in their Flying Machines	Julie Andrews – The Sound of Music; Jane Fonda – Cat Ballou; Barbara Harris – A Thousand Clowns; Rita Tushingham – The Knack ...and How to Get It; Natalie Wood – Inside Daisy Clover
Best Supporting Performance in a Motion Picture – Drama, Comedy or Musical
Supporting Actor	Supporting Actress
Oskar Werner - The Spy Who Came in from the Cold; Red Buttons - Harlow; Frank Finlay - Othello; Hardy Krüger - The Flight of the Phoenix; Telly Savalas - Battle of the Bulge	Ruth Gordon - Inside Daisy Clover; Joan Blondell - The Cincinnati Kid; Joyce Redman - Othello; Thelma Ritter - Boeing Boeing; Peggy Wood - The Sound of Music
Other
Best Director	Best Screenplay
David Lean - Doctor Zhivago; Guy Green - A Patch of Blue; John Schlesinger - Darling; Robert Wise - The Sound of Music; William Wyler - The Collector	Doctor Zhivago − Robert Bolt; The Agony and the Ecstasy − Philip Dunne; The Collector − John Kohn and Stanley Mann; A Patch of Blue − Guy Green; The Slender Thread − Stirling Silliphant
Best Foreign Film (English language)	Best Foreign Film (Foreign language)
Darling; The Knack ...and How to Get It; The Leather Boys; Ninety Degrees in the Shade; Othello	Juliet of the Spirits (Giulietta degli spiriti), Italy; Always Further On (Tarahumara, cada vez más lejos), Mexico; Circle of Love (La ronde), France; Red Beard (Akahige), Japan; The Umbrellas of Cherbourg, France
Best Original Score	Best Original Song
"Doctor Zhivago" - Maurice Jarre; "Battle of the Bulge" - Benjamin Frankel; "The Great Race" - Henry Mancini; "The Sandpiper" - Johnny Mandel; "The Yellow Rolls-Royce" -Riz Ortolani	"Forget Domani" - The Yellow Rolls-Royce; "Ballad of Cat Ballou" - Cat Ballou; "The Shadow of Your Smile" - The Sandpiper; "The Sweetheart Tree" - The Great Race; "That Funny Feeling" - That Funny Feeling

=== Television ===
Best Television Series
Best TV Show
The Man from U.N.C.L.E.; Frank Sinatra: A Man and His Music; Get Smart; I Spy; My Name is Barbra
Best Performance in a Television Series
Best TV Star - Male	Best TV Star - Female
David Janssen - The Fugitive; Don Adams - Get Smart; Ben Gazzara - Run for Your Life; David McCallum - The Man from U.N.C.L.E.; Robert Vaughn - The Man from U.N.C.L.E.	Anne Francis - Honey West; Patty Duke - The Patty Duke Show; Mia Farrow - Peyton Place; Dorothy Malone - Peyton Place; Barbara Stanwyck - The Big Valley

== Award breakdown ==
=== Film ===
Winners (minimum 1 win)

- 5 / 5 Doctor Zhivago: Best Actor and Film - Drama, Best Director, Best Original Score & Best Screenplay
- 2 / 4 The Sound of Music: Best Actress and Film - Musical or Comedy
- 1 / 1 The Spy Who Came in from the Cold: Best Supporting Actor
- 1 / 2 Inside Daisy Clover: Best Supporting Actress
- 1 / 2 The Yellow Rolls-Royce: Best Original Song
- 1 / 4 Cat Ballou: Best Actor - Musical or Comedy
- 1 / 4 The Collector: Best Actress - Drama

Nominees (minimum 2 nominations)

- 0 / 2 Boeing Boeing
- 0 / 2 The Knack ...and How to Get It
- 0 / 3 Those Magnificent Men in their Flying Machines
- 0 / 3 A Thousand Clowns
- 0 / 4 The Great Race
- 0 / 4 Othello
