= Ship of Fools (film) =

1965 film by Stanley Kramer

- Theatrical poster
- Directed by: Stanley Kramer
- Screenplay by: Abby Mann
- Based on: Ship of Fools; 1962 novel by Katherine Anne Porter
- Produced by: Stanley Kramer
- Starring: Vivien Leigh; Simone Signoret; Jose Ferrer; Lee Marvin; Oskar Werner; Elizabeth Ashley; George Segal; Jose Greco; Michael Dunn; Charles Korvin; Heinz Ruehmann; Lilia Skala
- Cinematography: Ernest Laszlo
- Edited by: Robert C. Jones
- Music by: Ernest Gold
- Color process: Black and white
- Production company: Stanley Kramer Productions
- Distributed by: Columbia Pictures Corporation
- Release date: July 29, 1965
- Running time: 150 minutes
- Country: United States
- Languages: English; German; Spanish
- Box office: $3,500,000 (rentals) Anticipated rentals accruing distributors in North America

Ship of Fools is a 1965 American drama film directed by Stanley Kramer, set on board an ocean liner bound for Germany from Mexico in 1933. It stars a prominent ensemble cast of 11 stars — Vivien Leigh (in her final film role), Simone Signoret, Jose Ferrer, Lee Marvin, Oskar Werner, Elizabeth Ashley, George Segal, Jose Greco, Michael Dunn, Charles Korvin, and Heinz Rühmann.

Ship of Fools, which was based on Katherine Anne Porter's 1962 novel of the same name, was highly regarded, with reviewers praising the cast's performance but also noting, at 150 minutes, the movie's overlong (for 1965) runtime. The film was nominated for eight Academy Awards in 1966, including for Best Picture, Best Actor for Oskar Werner, Best Actress for Simone Signoret, and Best Supporting Actor for Michael Dunn. It won for Best Art Direction, Black-and-White and Best Cinematography, Black-and-White. The title is also a reference to the popular allegory and the medieval satire of the same name.

== Synopsis ==
The action takes place almost entirely on board a passenger ship in 1933, between Veracruz Mexico and Bremerhaven, Germany. Most of the scenes unfold on the First Class deck or among the upper middle-class passengers, but the ship is also carrying 600 displaced workers―far more than the ship is certified to carry―and they are assigned to squalid conditions in steerage. They are all being deported back to Spain by the order of the Cuban dictator, Gerardo Machado. Many of the passengers bound for Nazi Germany are happy, some are apprehensive, while others downplay the significance of the political situation. Passenger attitudes differ among those who feel "superior", who exclude and demean others, and the "excluded" passengers, who tend to be sympathetic and supportive of others.

== Plot ==
The ship's medical officer, Dr. Schumann, takes a special interest in La Condesa, a Spanish countess with an opiate addiction, being deported from Cuba to a Spanish prison in Tenerife for illegally aiding the rebel cause in the Cuban Revolution of 1933. The 600 field workers in steerage, being deported to Spain due to the low market price of Cuban sugar, cheer the Condesa as she boards the ship under police escort. She tells the doctor she was motivated by seeing the impoverished conditions in which 5,000 laborers lived, under patronage of the man with whom she lived in luxury. She manipulates the doctor for drugs, but her activism aligns with the doctor's humanitarian ideals that the laborers in steerage be treated like human beings rather than cargo. Their shared sympathies soon evolve into love, though both realize it is a hopeless situation. The doctor conceals his heart condition from her.

Selected passengers, mostly Aryan Germans, are invited to dine each night at the captain's table. Some are amused and others offended by the anti-Jewish rants of a German businessman, Rieber, who begins an affair with Lizzi, a blonde woman who admires him for his vitality and mind, until she learns he is married. Austrian-born Rieber extols the virtues of German nationalism and eugenics. The captain is reassured by Rieber's rants, believing that nobody can ever take the Nazi Party seriously. Though Jews and a dwarf are excluded from the table, the Hutten's dog, Baby, is allowed. When Baby is thrown overboard by children from steerage, the dog is saved, but an animal-loving laborer drowns in the rescue, despite the doctor's ministrations. The Huttens fuss over the dog, oblivious that its rescuer has died, even when informed by the doctor.

The Jewish Lowenthal is seated at a side table with a dwarf named Glocken, and the two bond over their social exclusion. Later Freytag, a German passenger, is moved to this table when Rieber learns Freytag's wife is Jewish. Eventually Freytag discloses that he is separated from his Jewish wife due to pressure from his family and his employer as result of Nazi Rassenschande rhetoric. Revealing his Iron Cross 2nd class he earned in World War I, Lowenthal discusses with Glocken what it means to be German, including the Nazi Party and its anti-Jewish sentiment, which Lowenthal hopes to be temporary saying Jews have been good for Germany. Lowenthal is ultimately positive about the future of Jews in Germany, while Glocken is diametrically opposed in his pessimism. Glocken tells Lowenthal that he may be the biggest fool on the ship.

An American artist couple, David and Jenny, have a passionate but tumultuous relationship. David is disconsolate at his lack of success as a socially committed artist; the independent Jenny dislikes his "unsellable" art and does not wish to compete with it in the relationship. He is dismissive of her artistic talent, which she herself undervalues. David expresses that whoever shares his life will need to accept that his art will always supersede her. Jenny fears that their life together will be endlessly fighting, with neither willing to put the other's needs before their own.

Passengers are entertained nightly by a troupe of flamenco musicians and dancers, whose leader pimps the women in the troupe. Johann, an unpaid caregiver to Herr Graf, his invalid uncle, ignores the wholesome and insecure Elsa, who is traveling with her parents. Instead, Johann is attracted to one of the dancers, who rejects him for inability to pay. Johann threatens his stingy uncle if he does not give him money which has been promised to him in his uncle's will. He loses his virginity to one of the dancers, who treats him with gentleness when he pays.

Mary Treadwell, a divorced fading beauty hoping to recapture her youth in Paris, is too mature to interest the captain. She disdains the lieutenant who shows interest, dismissing him first as doing his duty to unattended women and later as insignificant. When former baseball player and fellow American Bill Tenny is seated at her table, she finds him crass and ignorant. Tenny expresses surprise at the open hostility toward the Jews on board; she sarcastically replies that maybe he was too busy "lynching Negroes" to focus on Jews. Tenny pesters one of the flamenco dancers, believing that buying a magnum of champagne entitles him to have sex with her. She gives him the cabin number of Mrs. Treadwell. In a drunken stupor, Tenny barges into the cabin and accosts Mrs. Treadwell, who momentarily responds passionately until she realizes that he has mistaken her for a prostitute; she then hits him repeatedly and expels him from the cabin.

The ship arrives in Tenerife, where the deported workers from steerage disembark. The doctor briefly considers staying with the Condesa, but the captain calls him foolish, contending that she manipulated him for drugs. After an emotionally painful farewell with the doctor, the Condesa is forced to exit the ship under Civil Guard escort. When the captain tells the distraught doctor she is not worth his anguish, the doctor explodes in a fit of pique, throwing cognac in his face and rebuking him, expressing that the Condesa took action against injustice, while they just carry out the orders they are given. Apologetic, the captain advises the doctor that he looks ill and should not respond to a call from a passenger for medical attention. The doctor ignores this and dies of a heart attack. Upon arrival in Bremerhaven his body is unloaded in a coffin with his estranged wife and sons in attendance.

At disembarkation the passengers are shown descending in turn, going back to their ordinary lives. The last passenger to leave the ship is Glocken, who breaks the fourth wall and says he can hear the audience saying, "What has all this to do with us? ...Nothing", he chuckles and walks off.

== Cast ==
Vivien Leigh as Mary Treadwell

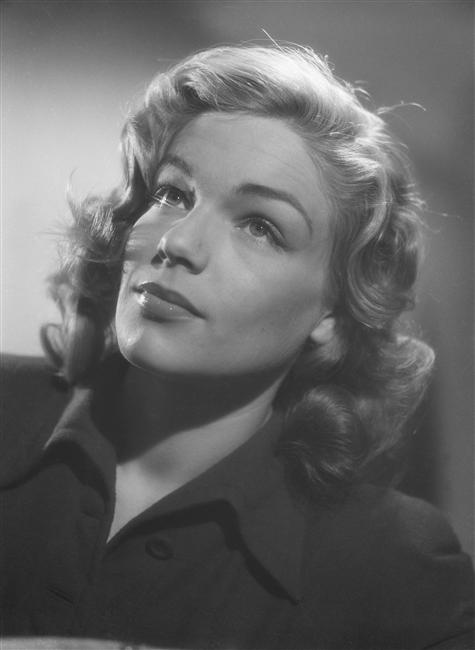
Simone Signoret plays "La Condesa", a Spanish countess and social activist transported to prison for helping arm agitators.

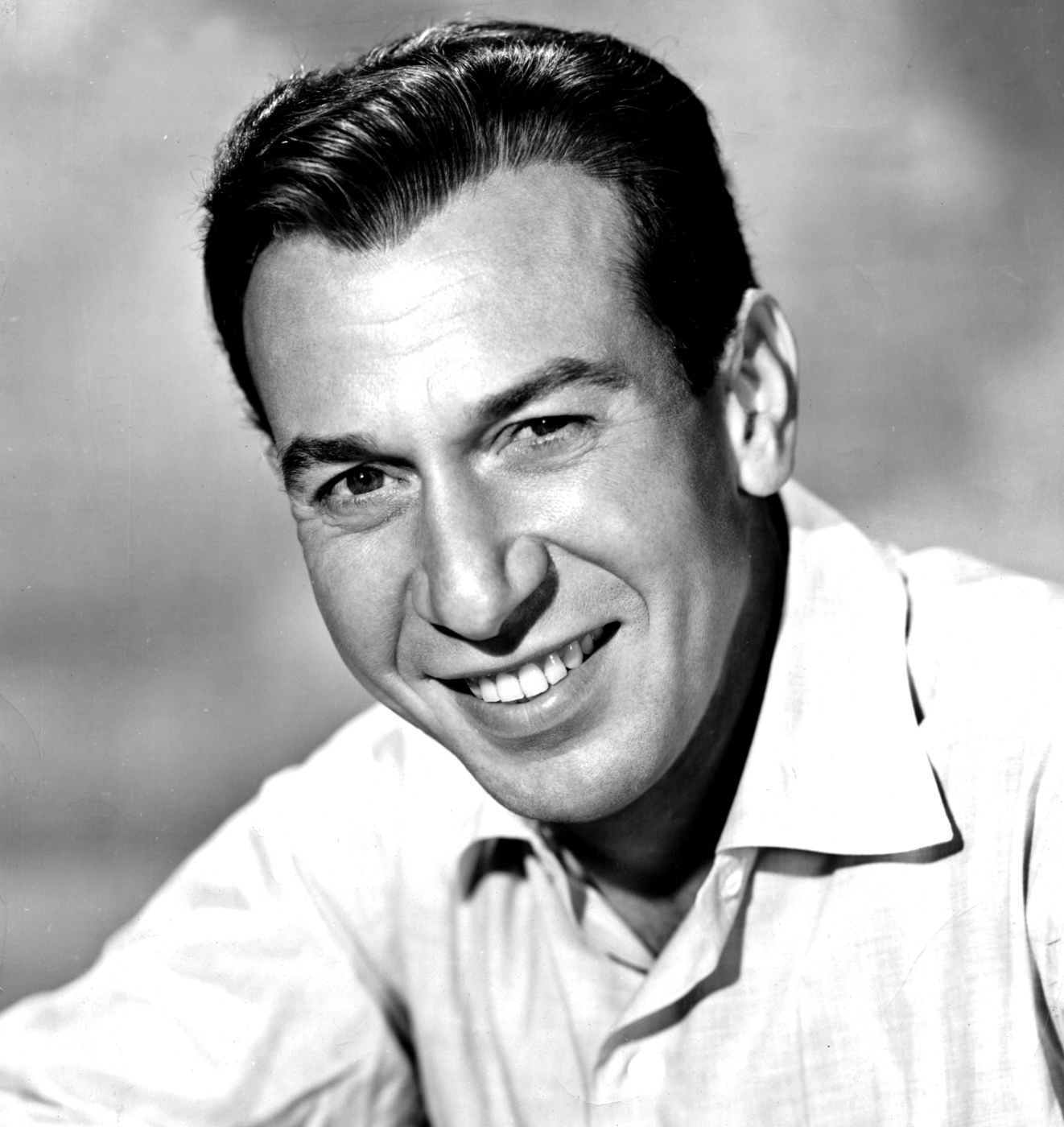
Jose Ferrer plays Rieber, an anti-Jewish German businessman who rants Nazi ideology.

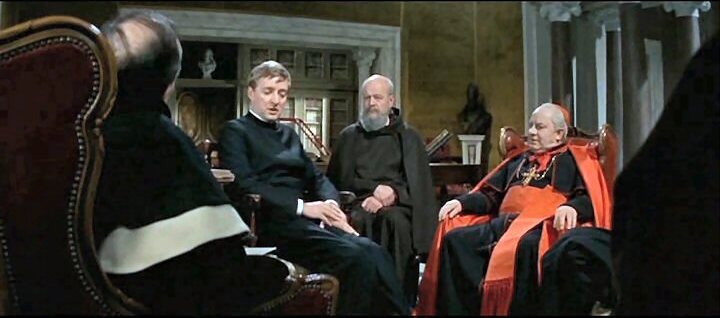
Oskar Werner (second from left) plays Dr. Schumann, who shares the Condesa’s humanitarian insistence that the laborers in steerage be treated like human beings.

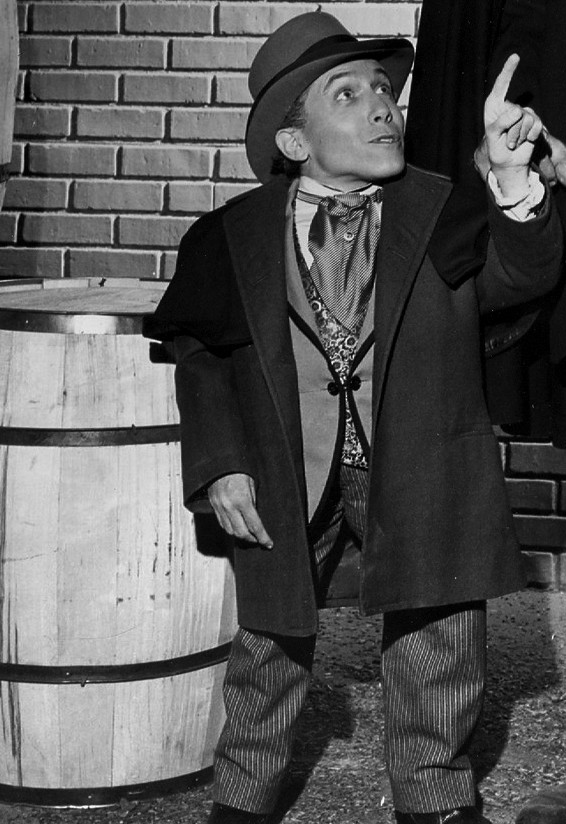
Michael Dunn plays Glocken, a philosophical German dwarf, socially excluded from the Captain’s table for his deformity.

- Vivien Leigh as Mary Treadwell
- Simone Signoret as La Condesa
- José Ferrer as Rieber
- Lee Marvin as Tenny
- Oskar Werner as Dr. Willie Schumann
- Elizabeth Ashley as Jenny
- George Segal as David
- Jose Greco as Pepe
- Michael Dunn as Glocken
- Charles Korvin as Capt. Thiele
- Heinz Rühmann as Lowenthal
- Lilia Skala as Frau Hutten
- Barbara Luna as Amparo
- Christiane Schmidtmer as Lizzi
- Alf Kjellin as Freytag
- Werner Klemperer as Lt. Huebner
- John Wengraf as Graf
- Olga Fabian as Frau Schmitt
- Gila Golan as Elsa
- Oscar Beregi as Lutz
- Stanley Adams as Hutten
- Karen Verne as Frau Lutz
- Charles de Vries as Johann
- Lydia Torea as Pastora
- Henry Calvin as Fat Man
- Peter Mamakos as Religious Man
- Paul Daniel as Carlos
- David Renard as Woodcarver
- Rudy Carrella as Ric
- Silvia Marino as Rac
- Anthony Brand as Guitarist
- Minta Durfee as Ship passenger (uncredited)
- Mushy Callahan as Ship passenger (uncredited)
- Eddie Baker as Prizak (uncredited)
- Steven Geray as Steward aboard Vera (uncredited)

== Songs ==
Music by Ernest Gold
Lyrics by Jack Lloyd

- "Heute abend geh'n wir bummeln auf der Reeperbahn" ("Tonight we're going for a stroll on the Reeperbahn")
- "Irgendwie, irgendwo, irgendwann" ("Somehow, somewhere, sometime")

== Production ==
Katherine Anne Porter's novel Ship of Fools was published in 1962. The essayist and short story author's only novel was the culmination of a 20-year-long project that was based on her reminiscences of a 1931 ocean cruise she had taken from Veracruz to Germany.

Producer David O. Selznick wanted to purchase the film rights, but United Artists owned the property and demanded $400,000. The novel was adapted for film by Abby Mann. Producer and director Stanley Kramer, who ended up with the film, planned to star Vivien Leigh but was initially unaware of her fragile mental and physical health. (Note: At one point in the pre-production, Katharine Hepburn was considered for the role of Mary Treadwell, but dropped out and was replaced by Leigh.) The film proved to be her last film and in later recounting her work, Kramer remembered her courage in taking on the difficult role, "She was ill, and the courage to go ahead, the courage to make the film--was almost unbelievable." Leigh's performance was tinged by paranoia and resulted in outbursts that marred her relationship with other actors, although both Simone Signoret and Lee Marvin were sympathetic and understanding. In particular, during one scene shoot, she hit Lee Marvin so hard with a spiked shoe, that it bruised his face.

At the conclusion of filming, screenwriter Mann reportedly threw a party for almost the entire cast and crew except Gila Golan, whose performance Mann was reputedly not happy with.

== Reception ==
Although well received by audiences, Ship of Fools was compared to Grand Hotel. "Preachy and melodramatic" was another criticism, although the cast was universally praised.

Bosley Crowther of The New York Times said of the film:

Stanley Kramer has fetched a powerful, ironic film ... there is such wealth of reflection upon the human condition in Ship of Fools and so subtle an orchestration of the elements of love and hate, achieved through an expert compression of the novel by Mr. Kramer and his script writer, Abby Mann, that it is really not fair to tag it with the label of any previous film. It has its own quiet distinction in the way it illuminates a theme.

Crowther also singled out the work of Oskar Werner. Similarly, Variety noted, "Director-producer Stanley Kramer and scenarist Abby Mann have distilled the essence of Katherine Anne Porter's bulky novel in a film that appeals to the intellect and the emotions."

The film was banned in Francoist Spain because of its anti-fascist stance.

On Rotten Tomatoes, Ship of Fools holds a rating of 58% from 24 reviews.

== Awards and nominations ==
Award	Category	Nominee(s)	Result	Ref.
Academy Awards	Best Picture	Stanley Kramer	Nominated	
Academy Awards	Best Actor	Oskar Werner	Nominated	
Academy Awards	Best Actress	Simone Signoret	Nominated	
Academy Awards	Best Supporting Actor	Michael Dunn	Nominated	
Academy Awards	Best Screenplay – Based on Material from Another Medium	Abby Mann	Nominated	
Academy Awards	Best Art Direction – Black-and-White	Art Direction: Robert Clatworthy; Set Decoration: Joseph Kish	Won	
Academy Awards	Best Cinematography – Black-and-White	Ernest Laszlo	Won	
Academy Awards	Best Costume Design – Black-and-White	Jean Louis and Bill Thomas	Nominated	
British Academy Film Awards	Best Foreign Actor	Oskar Werner	Nominated	
British Academy Film Awards	Best Foreign Actress	Simone Signoret	Nominated	
Golden Globe Awards	Best Motion Picture – Drama		Nominated	
Golden Globe Awards	Best Actor in a Motion Picture – Drama	Oskar Werner	Nominated	
Golden Globe Awards	Best Actress in a Motion Picture – Drama	Simone Signoret	Nominated	
Laurel Awards	Top Male Supporting Performance	Michael Dunn	4th Place	
National Board of Review Awards	Top Ten Films		4th Place	
National Board of Review Awards	Best Actor	Lee Marvin (also for Cat Ballou)	Won	
New York Film Critics Circle Awards	Best Actor	Oskar Werner	Nominated	
Writers Guild of America Awards	Best Written American Drama	Abby Mann	Nominated	

Vivien Leigh won the L'Étoile de Cristal for her performance in a leading role. (Note: L'Étoile de Cristal was the French equivalent of the Oscar.)

The film is recognized by American Film Institute in these lists:

- 2005: AFI's 100 Years of Film Scores – Nominated

== Home media ==
The film has been issued on VHS, laserdisc and DVD. The film's standalone DVD release is an open matte 1.33:1 transfer with no supplements. The film was later reissued in widescreen with supplements in a Stanley Kramer box set from Sony Pictures Home Entertainment. (Note: The Sony re-release was bundled with The 5,000 Fingers of Dr. T., The Wild One, The Member of the Wedding, and Guess Who's Coming to Dinner.) Currently, the film is also available in a budget-priced two-disc, four-movie collection DVD licensed from Sony to Mill Creek Entertainment. (Note: Other films that are included are Bobby Deerfield, Baby the Rain Must Fall and The Chase.) All four films are presented in their original theatrical aspect ratios and are anamorphically enhanced. The film has been released on Blu-ray in a double feature pack with the film Lilith via Mill Creek.

== See also ==
- List of American films of 1965
