= 18th Directors Guild of America Awards =

- Date: February 12, 1966
- Country: United States
- Presented by: Directors Guild of America

Highlights
- Best Director Feature Film: The Sound of Music – Robert Wise
- Best Director Television: My Name Is Barbra – Dwight Hemion
- Website: https://www.dga.org/Awards/History/1960s/1965.aspx?value=1965

The 18th Directors Guild of America Awards, honoring the outstanding directorial achievements in film and television in 1965, were presented on February 12, 1966.

== Winners and nominees ==
=== Film ===
Feature Film

Robert Wise – The Sound of Music

- Sidney J. Furie – The Ipcress File
- Sidney Lumet – The Pawnbroker
- John Schlesinger – Darling
- Elliot Silverstein – Cat Ballou

=== Television ===
Television

Dwight Hemion – My Name Is Barbra

- Alan Handley – The Julie Andrews Show
- Sheldon Leonard – I Spy for "Affair in T'Sien Cha"
- Stuart Rosenberg – Bob Hope Presents the Chrysler Theatre for "Back to Back"
- George Schaefer – Hallmark Hall of Fame for "The Magnificent Yankee"

=== D.W. Griffith Award ===
- William Wyler
