= Darling (1965 film) =

1965 film by John Schlesinger

- Theatrical release poster
- Directed by: John Schlesinger
- Screenplay by: Frederic Raphael
- Story by: Frederic Raphael; John Schlesinger; Joseph Janni
- Produced by: Joseph Janni
- Starring: Dirk Bogarde; Laurence Harvey; Julie Christie
- Cinematography: Ken Higgins
- Edited by: James Clark
- Music by: John Dankworth
- Production companies: Joseph Janni Production; Vic Films Productions; Appia Films
- Distributed by: Anglo-Amalgamated
- Release dates: 15 July 1965 (Moscow); 16 September 1965 (United Kingdom)
- Running time: 127 minutes
- Country: United Kingdom
- Language: English
- Budget: £392,446 or $1.1 million
- Box office: $4.5 million

Darling is a 1965 British drama film directed by John Schlesinger from a screenplay written by Frederic Raphael. It stars Julie Christie as Diana Scott, a young successful model and actress in Swinging London, toying with the affections of two older men, played by Dirk Bogarde and Laurence Harvey. The film was shot on location in London, Paris, and Rome and at Shepperton Studios by cinematographer Kenneth Higgins; the musical score was composed by Sir John Dankworth.

The film premiered at the 4th Moscow International Film Festival on 16 July 1965, and was released in cinemas in the United Kingdom on 16 September by Anglo-Amalgamated. It became a critical and commercial success, grossing $4.5 million, and received five nominations at the 38th Academy Awards, including Best Picture, and won in three categories: Best Actress (for Christie), Best Original Screenplay, and Best Costume Design. It also won four BAFTA Awards: Best British Actor (Bogarde), Best British Actress (Christie), Best British Screenplay and Best Art Direction (Black-and-White).

== Plot ==
Diana Scott is a bored, young model married to a man named Tony Bridges. One day, Diana meets Robert Gold, a literary interviewer/director for television arts programmes, when she is spotted on the street by his roving film crew and interviewed by him about young people's views on convention. Diana is invited to watch the final edit in the TV studio, and it is there that their relationship starts. After liaisons in hotel rooms, they leave their spouses (and, in Robert's case, children) and move into an apartment.

As a couple, they become part of the fashionable media/arts set in London. Initially, Diana is jealous when Robert sees his wife while visiting his children, but she quickly loses this attachment when she mixes with the men of the media, arts and advertising scene, particularly Miles Brand, a powerful executive for the Glass Corporation, who gets her a part in a trashy film after she has sex with him. The bookish Robert prefers the quiet life; it is he who now becomes jealous but increasingly detached, depressed, and lonely.

Diana attends a high-class charity draw for world hunger for which she is the face. The event, adorned by giant images of African famine victims, is juxtaposed with wealthy guests gorging themselves with food. Diana later becomes pregnant and has an abortion to sustain her career.

Diana flies to Paris with Miles for jet-set sophistication. There, she finds the wild party, beat music, strip dance mind game, and cross-dressing displays repellent, but she slowly adjusts and gains the respect of the crowd when she taunts Miles during the game. On her return to London, Robert calls her a whore upon discovering her affair with Miles and leaves her. Miles then casts her as "The Happiness Girl" in the Glass Corporation's advertising campaign for a chocolate company.

Diana finds comfort in the company of Malcolm, a gay photographer, who has created her new, famous look. They go shopping, where she randomly shoplifts several items. On location at a palazzo near Rome, Diana smiles in her medieval/Renaissance costume and completes "The Happiness Girl" shoot. She is taken with the beauty of the building and the landscape, getting on well with the prince, Cesare, who owns the palazzo. With the friendly Malcolm, Diana decides to stay in Italy. They stay in a simple house by a small harbour in Capri, where Diana dabbles in Catholicism. They are visited by Cesare, who arrives in a huge launch, invites them on board and proposes to Diana. She politely declines his proposal, but Cesare leaves the offer open.

Diana returns to London, still living in the flat she shared with Robert, where she hosts a party with Miles and other characters. Robert visits Diana, but he sees that she is with Miles and departs. Becoming disillusioned with Miles and the vacuous London jet set, Diana flirts with the Catholicism again. Impulsively, she flies to Italy and marries the prince, which proves to be ill-fated. Although she is waited on hand and foot by the servants, she is almost immediately abandoned in the vast palazzo by Cesare, who visits Rome frequently.

Diana flees to London to visit Robert, and the two have sex, leading her to believe they are ready for a stable, long-term relationship. However, in the morning, he tells her that he is leaving her and that he fooled her only as an act of revenge. He reserves a flight to Rome, packs her into his car, and takes her to Heathrow Airport to send her back to her life as Princess Della Romita. At the airport, Diana is hounded by the press. She boards the plane to leave.

== Cast ==
- Julie Christie as Diana Scott
- Laurence Harvey as Miles Brand
- Dirk Bogarde as Robert Gold
- José Luis de Vilallonga as Prince Cesare della Romita
- Roland Curram as Malcolm
- Basil Henson as Alec Prosser-Jones
- Helen Lindsay as Felicity Prosser-Jones
- Carlo Palmucci as Curzio della Romita
- Dante Posani as Gino
- Umberto Raho as Palucci
- Marika Rivera as woman
- Alex Scott as Sean Martin
- Ernest Walder as Kurt
- Brian Wilde as Willett
- Pauline Yates as Estelle Gold
- Peter Bayliss as Lord Grant
- Richard Bidlake as Rupert Crabtree
- Trevor Bowen as Tony Bridges
- Annette Carell as Billie Castiglione
- Jean Claudio as Raoul Maxim
- Georgina Cookson as Carlotta Hale
- James Cossins as Basildon
- Jane Downs as Julie

Uncredited

- Tyler Butterworth as William Prosser-Jones
- Hugo Dyson as Walter Southgate
- Ann Firbank as Sybil Martin
- Angus MacKay as Ivor Dawlish
- Lucille Soong as Allie
- Silvia Dionisio as Sandra della Romita
- Ray Lovelock as Paolo della Romita
- John Steiner as Garrett
- Vernon Dobtcheff as art critic
- Zakes Mokae as man at party
- John Woodvine as customs officer
- John Schlesinger as theatre director

== Production ==
Julie Christie's character was reportedly inspired by the exploits of actress Beth Rogan.

According to Richard Gregson, agent for John Schlesinger, the budget was around £300,000 and was provided by Nat Cohen at Anglo-Amalgamated. The movie was originally called Woman on Her Way.

Shirley MacLaine originally was cast as Diana, but was replaced by Christie. Production on Darling commenced in August 1964 and wrapped in December. It was filmed on location in London, Paris, and Rome. The Romita palazzo was portrayed by the Medici villa. The final scene was shot at Heathrow Airport in London.

In 1971, New York magazine wrote of mod fashion and its wearers: "This new, déclassé English girl was epitomized by Julie Christie in Darling—amoral, rootless, emotionally immature, and apparently irresistible." John Schlesinger admitted Julie Christie did not want to do her nude scene.

== Reception ==
Despite receiving many awards at the time of release, the film later developed a mixed reputation. In his New Biographical Dictionary of Film entry on Schlesinger, David Thomson writes that the film "deserves a place in every archive to show how rapidly modishness withers. Beauty is central to the cinema and Schlesinger seems an unreliable judge of it, over-rating Christie and rarely getting close enough to the action to make a fruitful stylistic bond with it". Leonard Maltin's Movie Guide described it as a "trendy, influential '60s film – in flashy form and cynical content". Tony Rayns, in the Time Out Film Guide, called the film a "leaden rehash of ideas from Godard, Antonioni and Bergman", although with nods to the "Royal Court school", which "now looks grotesquely pretentious and out of touch with the realities of the life-styles that it purports to represent."

On Rotten Tomatoes, Darling holds an approval rating of 74% from 23 reviews, with an average rating of 7.1/10. Metacritic, which uses a weighted average, assigned the film a score of 62 out of 100, based on 10 critics, indicating "generally favorable" reviews.

=== Box office ===
The film was a commercial success, grossing $12 million at the worldwide box office against a budget of £400,000. It earned $4 million in theatrical rentals.

According to Richard Gregson, the film only earned £250,000 in the United Kingdom, but Nat Cohen sold the U.S. rights to Joe E. Levine for $900,000 and made a profit. The film was more successful in the U.S.

=== Accolades ===
Institution	Year	Category	Nominee(s)	Result	Ref.
Academy Awards	1965	Best Picture	Joseph Janni	Nominated	
Academy Awards	1965	Best Director	John Schlesinger	Nominated	
Academy Awards	1965	Best Actress	Julie Christie	Won	
Academy Awards	1965	Best Story and Screenplay – Written Directly for the Screen	Frederic Raphael	Won	
Academy Awards	1965	Best Costume Design – Black-and-White	Julie Harris	Won	
British Academy Film Awards	1965	Best British Film	John Schlesinger	Nominated	
British Academy Film Awards	1965	Best British Actor	Dirk Bogarde	Won	
British Academy Film Awards	1965	Best British Actress	Julie Christie	Won	
British Academy Film Awards	1965	Best British Screenplay	Frederic Raphael	Won	
British Academy Film Awards	1965	Best British Art Direction – Black-and-White	Ray Simm	Won	
British Academy Film Awards	1965	Best British Cinematography – Black-and-White	Kenneth Higgins	Nominated	
Directors Guild of America Awards	1965	Outstanding Directorial Achievement in Motion Pictures	John Schlesinger	Nominated	
Golden Globe Awards	1965	Best English-Language Foreign Film		Won	
Golden Globe Awards	1965	Best Actress in a Motion Picture – Drama	Julie Christie	Nominated	
Golden Globe Awards	1965	Best Director – Motion Picture	John Schlesinger	Nominated	
Laurel Awards	1965	Top Female Dramatic Performance	Julie Christie	Won	
Mexican Cinema Journalists	1967	Best Foreign Actress	Julie Christie	Won	
Moscow International Film Festival	1965	Grand Prix	John Schlesinger	Nominated	
National Board of Review Awards	1965	Top Ten Films		6th Place	
National Board of Review Awards	1965	Best Director	John Schlesinger	Won	
National Board of Review Awards	1965	Best Actress	Julie Christie	Won	
New York Film Critics Circle Awards	1965	Best Film		Won	
New York Film Critics Circle Awards	1965	Best Director	John Schlesinger	Won	
New York Film Critics Circle Awards	1965	Best Actress	Julie Christie	Won	
Writers' Guild of Great Britain Awards	1965	Best British Comedy Screenplay	Frederic Raphael	Won	
Writers' Guild of Great Britain Awards	1965	Outstanding British Original Screenplay	Frederic Raphael	Won	

== See also ==
- BFI Top 100 British films
- List of oldest and youngest Academy Award winners and nominees — youngest winners for Best Actress in a Leading Role
