= 1965 New York Film Critics Circle Awards =

31st New York Film Critics Circle Awards

31st New York Film Critics Circle Awards

January 29, 1966
(announced December 27, 1965)

Best Picture:
Darling

The 31st New York Film Critics Circle Awards honored the best filmmaking of 1965.

== Winners ==
- Best Actor:
  - Oskar Werner - Ship of Fools
- Best Actress:
  - Julie Christie - Darling
- Best Director:
  - John Schlesinger - Darling
- Best Film:
  - Darling
- Best Foreign Language Film:
  - Juliet of the Spirits (Giulietta degli spiriti) • Italy/France
