= John Berry (film director) =

American film director (1917–1999)

- Born: Jak Szold; September 6, 1917; New York City, U.S.
- Died: November 29, 1999 (aged 82); Paris, France
- Other name: Jack Berry
- Occupations: Film director, screenwriter, actor, film producer
- Spouses: Gladys Frankl (m. 1944) Myriam Boyer (m. 1975)
- Children: Dennis Berry, Arny Berry

John Berry (born Jak Szold; September 6, 1917 – November 29, 1999) was an American film and theatre director, screenwriter, producer, and actor. He went into exile in France when his career was interrupted by the Hollywood blacklist.

== Early life ==
Berry was born Jak Szold in The Bronx, New York City, the son of a Polish-Jewish father and a Romanian mother. He was a child performer in vaudeville, first going on stage at the age of four. In his teens he briefly worked as a boxer under the name Jackie Sold.

Berry's father was a restaurateur who at one point owned 28 restaurants around New York City but he went out of business during the Great Depression and Berry sought to support himself by working as a comedian and master of ceremonies in the Catskill resorts as well as working as an actor.

== Career ==
=== Mercury Theatre and Hollywood ===
Berry's first big break came when he was hired by the Mercury Theatre for its debut production, titled Caesar (1937). Berry acted in other roles with the theater and assisted Orson Welles in directing the 1942 production of Native Son. In a late-life interview with The New York Times, Berry spoke positively of his association with Welles and John Houseman, who co-founded the Mercury. "It was like living near the center of a volcano of creating inspiration and fury, glamorous and exciting, full of the kind of theatricality that seems lost forever," he said.

By 1943, Houseman was producing films in Hollywood at Paramount Pictures and hired Berry, who attended Paramount Studios' director-in-training programme, to direct Houseman's production of Miss Susie Slagle's starring Veronica Lake and Lillian Gish. Berry stayed with Paramount in Hollywood and directed other features, including From This Day Forward and Cross My Heart. Berry was sacked by Paramount for refusing to direct the studio's 1946 Alan Ladd spy film O.S.S.

Berry returned to direct the musical Casbah (1948) for Tony Martin's production company featuring Martin and Yvonne De Carlo for Universal, Tension (1950) for MGM and He Ran All the Way (1951) starring John Garfield and Shelley Winters.

=== Blacklisted ===
In 1950, Berry agreed to direct a short documentary on the Hollywood 10, a group of directors and writers who refused to cooperate with the House Un-American Activities Committee (HUAC) in their pursuit of supposed Communist Party infiltration within the U.S. film industry. After directing the crime drama He Ran All the Way (1951), Berry was named a communist by fellow director and former party member Edward Dmytryk, one of the Hollywood Ten, who had been jailed for contempt of Congress for refusing to cooperate with HUAC. A few months after being released from prison, Dmytryk voluntarily testified before the HUAC in April 1951, clearing himself by "naming names". Berry had joined the Communist Party during the Spanish Civil War.

By naming Berry and 25 other alleged communists, Dmytryk was then able to resume his Hollywood career. Berry was also named by ex-Communist Party member Frank Tuttle, who testified before HUAC in 1951 after returning from Austria, to clear his name and regain employment in Hollywood. Unable to secure work, Berry left the U.S. and resettled with his family in Paris. He Ran All the Way would be the last American film Berry directed for nearly a quarter of a century.

In France, Berry was hired to co-direct Atoll K (1951), the last comedy film of Stan Laurel and Oliver Hardy. Berry did not receive a screen credit; only French director Léo Joannon was credited as director.

During the 1950s, Berry directed two films starring Eddie Constantine, Ça va barder (1953) and Je suis un sentimental (1955) and he also directed Tamango (1958), a film about a slave uprising that starred Dorothy Dandridge.

=== Return from exile ===
The blacklist was broken in 1960 with the release of two films written by blacklisted Hollywood Ten member Dalton Trumbo; Exodus and Spartacus, which gave Trumbo — one of the most prominent of the Ten — his first screen credits since being blackballed by Hollywood. With the blacklist gone, Berry returned to the U.S. in the early 1960s, where he directed episodes of the TV shows East Side/West Side and Seaway.

He continued to work in France, but again returned to the U.S. in the 1970s and directed several films, including Claudine (1974), starring Diahann Carroll, for which she received an Academy Award nomination; Thieves (1977) based on the Herb Gardner play and starring Marlo Thomas, Charles Grodin, and Irwin Corey; and The Bad News Bears Go to Japan (1978). At the time of his death in Paris, he was editing a film version (released in 2000, starring Danny Glover and Angela Bassett) of the 1969 Athol Fugard play Boesman and Lena, which he had directed in its acclaimed US premiere at the Circle in the Square Theatre in 1970.

Berry divided the remainder of his career between theater direction in London and film direction in Paris. Berry played Ben, the night club owner, in the movie Round Midnight (1986), which was produced by Irwin Winkler, the writer-director of Guilty by Suspicion.

Berry, looking back at his career for an interview with Newsday, remarked: "I wouldn't give up my life for anything. I have been a curiously blessed individual despite all I've lived through."

== Personal life ==
Berry married French actress Myriam Boyer in 1975, and they remained together until his death in 1999. His son from a previous marriage, Dennis (1944–2021), was also a filmmaker.

He was known as "Jack" to his friends.

=== Death ===
Berry died in Paris on November 29, 1999, aged 82.

== Legacy ==
Berry's experiences during the Hollywood blacklist era were the inspiration for the character played by Robert De Niro in the film Guilty by Suspicion (1991).

== Selected filmography ==
- Miss Susie Slagle's (1946)
- From This Day Forward (1946)
- Cross My Heart (1946)
- Casbah (1948)
- Tension (1950)
- The Hollywood Ten (1950)
- Atoll K (1950)
- He Ran All the Way (1951)
- It Happened in Paris (1952)
- Give 'em Hell (1955)
- Je suis un sentimental (1955)
- Don Juan (1956)
- Tamango (1958)
- Oh! Qué mambo (1959)
- Maya (1966)
- À tout casser (1968)
- Claudine (1974)
- Thieves (1977)
- The Bad News Bears Go to Japan (1978)
- Sister, Sister (1982)
