= A Thousand Clowns (play) =

1962 stage play by Herb Gardner

- Written by: Herb Gardner
- Original language: English
- Genre: Comedy
- Setting: Murray Burns' apartment and Arnold Burns' office. Manhattan. 1962.

Premiere
- Date premiered: April 4, 1962
- Place premiered: Eugene O'Neill Theatre

A Thousand Clowns is a comedic stage play written by American playwright Herb Gardner. The play premiered on Broadway in 1962 and was a critical and commercial success. The play was nominated for the Tony Award for Best Play and since the original production has been revived twice on Broadway in 1996 and 2001.

== Production history ==
The play opened on Broadway at the Eugene O'Neill Theatre on April 5, 1962. The original production was directed and produced by Fred Coe and ran for 423 regular performances closing on April 13, 1963. Coe would go on to direct the 1965 film adaptation. The original production was nominated for three Tony Awards including Best Play, Best Featured Actress (Sandy Dennis) and Best Featured Actor (Barry Gordon). Sandy Dennis won the Tony Award for her performance as Sandra Markowitz.

In 1996, Roundabout Theatre Company revived the play at the Criterion Center Stage Right, opening on July 15, 1996, and closing on August 10, 1996, after 32 regular performances. The production was directed by Scott Ellis.

In 2001, a third Broadway revival was produced, opening at the Longacre Theatre and directed by John Rando. The production opened on July 11, 2001, and closed on September 23, 2001, after 83 regular performances.

The play is available for licensing through Concord Theatricals.

In 1965, a film version of the play was released to critical success, earning four Academy Award nominations including Best Picture. Herb Gardner adapted his play for the screen as was nominated for Best Screenplay.

== Original casts and characters ==
Character	Broadway (1962)	Broadway (1996)	Broadway (2001)
Murray Burns	Jason Robards	Judd Hirsch	Tom Selleck
Sandra Markowitz	Sandy Dennis	Marin Hinkle	Barbara Garrick
Nick Burns	Barry Gordon	Dov Tiefenbach	Nicolas King
Leo Herman	Gene Saks	John Procaccino	Mark Blum
Albert Amundson	William Daniels	Jim Fyfe	Bradford Cover
Arnold Burns	Larry Haines	David Margulies	Robert LuPone

=== Awards and nominations ===
Award	Category	Nominee(s)	Result	Ref.
Tony Awards	Best Play	Written by Herb Gardner; Produced by Fred Coe and Arthur Cantor	Nominated	
Tony Awards	Best Featured Actor in a Play	Barry Gordon	Nominated	
Tony Awards	Best Featured Actress in a Play	Sandy Dennis	Won	
