= Thieves (1977 film) =

1977 film by John Berry

- Theatrical release poster
- Directed by: John Berry
- Screenplay by: Herb Gardner
- Based on: Thieves; 1974 play by Herb Gardner
- Produced by: George Barrie
- Starring: Marlo Thomas; Charles Grodin; Irwin Corey
- Cinematography: Andrew Laszlo; Arthur J. Ornitz
- Edited by: Craig McKay
- Production company: Brut Productions
- Distributed by: Paramount Pictures
- Release date: February 11, 1977
- Running time: 92 minutes
- Country: United States
- Language: English

Thieves is a 1977 American comedy film directed by John Berry, written by Herb Gardner, and starring Marlo Thomas, Charles Grodin and Irwin Corey. It was released on February 11, 1977, by Paramount Pictures. The film was based on Gardner's Broadway play, and has almost the same cast, with the main exception being that Charles Grodin is playing Martin rather than Richard Mulligan, though Grodin directed and produced the play.

== Plot ==
School principal Martin Cramer and schoolteacher Sally are a married couple in their 30s who are stuck in a rut. Their Upper East Side apartment is mostly unfurnished five weeks after they moved from Orchard Street because Sally forgot the name of the moving company. Sally wants to bring a juvenile delinquent student of hers named Carlton in to live with them, but Martin reminds her that the boy stole from him the last time they took him in. Sally laments that Martin is no longer the idealistic person he once was. When Sally says it is time they have a child of their own, Martin tells her to go to sleep. A week later, Sally, who is pregnant, initiates divorce proceedings and then leaves to stay with a friend while she considers getting an abortion. Sally phones Gordon, a man she met in the park, and Gordon invites her to his apartment. After a pleasant conversation Gordon reveals he is married with children to a woman who will not give him a divorce and they decide they would be better off as friends. Meanwhile, Martin has sex with a neighbor, Nancy.

Sally returns home to find that Carlton, who stole keys from the building's doorman Devlin, is stashing stolen goods in the apartment. He offers her the loot in exchange for a passing grade, but Sally offers instead to adopt Carlton if he goes straight. She learns of Martin's fling when she sees Nancy wearing Martin's sweatshirt. Martin returns to the Orchard Street apartment, where Sally eventually remembered sending their valuable antique furniture to, only to find that the current tenant sold the furniture for $40. Drinking a bottle of wine and reminiscing about his first date with Sally when the two broke into a closed Loew's movie theater, Martin breaks into the old theater again where a man named Perez tells him that the theater is now a church. Two police officers arrive to arrest Martin for breaking and entering, but Martin pulls a gun and flees. Sally visits her father Joe and asks him to accompany her to the abortion procedure, but he wants no part of it. After an impassioned speech from Sally about time being the real thief, Joe reveals that Sally was enrolled in school one year early and is 32, not 33 as she thought. He had been saving the "extra year" to give to her as a gift in his will, but decided that this was the day she needed it.

Sally returns to the apartment and finds that her suitcase has been stolen and Devlin is dead. She convinces two neighbors to move his body to a lobby couch while she phones the police. Martin returns and suggests that the two consider their options. Sally begins to leave, but Martin fires his gun in the air three times and says they cannot break up until they decide who is at fault, then begs her to stay. The two kiss and decide to run off hand-in-hand from the sound of police sirens.

== Cast ==
- Marlo Thomas as Sally Cramer
- Charles Grodin as Martin Cramer
- Irwin Corey as Joe Kaminsky
- Héctor Elizondo as Man Below
- Mercedes McCambridge as Street Lady
- John McMartin as Gordon
- Gary Merrill as Street Man
- Ann Wedgeworth as Nancy
- Larry B. Scott as Carlton
- Bob Fosse as Mr. Day
- Norman Matlock as Mr. Night
- Ian Martin as Devlin
- Janet Colazzo as Marianna
- Kenneth Kimmins as Stanley
- Santos Morales as Perez
- MacIntyre Dixon as Passenger
- Bill Lazarus as Officer Miranda
- Alice Drummond as Mrs. Ramsey
- Zvee Scooler as Old Man
- Craig Barrie as Sheriff
- Victor Le Guillow as Julio
- Lee Wallace as Harry
- Jess Osuna as Gilbey
- Joan Kaye as Flo

== Production ==
Herb Gardner's screenplay for Thieves was first realized in 1974 as a Broadway stage production of the same name, financed by Paramount in the hopes of drumming up interest for the film version. John Berry was fired as director five weeks into filming due to "mutual differences" with producer George Barrie. He was replaced by Gardner with Al Viola serving as standby director, but neither were given onscreen credit for directing.

Interior scenes were shot at Astoria Studios in New York, the first feature film to shoot there for almost 40 years.

== Reception ==
Richard Eder of The New York Times wrote that the film "is like a windup toy whose movements are being forced by a jaded and impatient child. It has some good notions, some good jokes and some good performers. But, with rare interludes, it is wrenched and graceless. It seems to be made for an audience whose humor and emotional receptiveness have gone deaf and astigmatic."

Gene Siskel of the Chicago Tribune gave the film one-and-a-half stars out of four and called it "a portrait of unhappy people, people unremittingly sad in a variety of tedious situations."

Arthur D. Murphy of Variety called it "an unfunny comedy" that was "full of superficial humor which doesn't even conceal the hysteria lying just below the characters' surface ... Only Ann Wedgeworth, as a promiscuous apartment dweller, projects any credibility — quite a lot, in fact, to stand out as the film's best performance."

Charles Champlin of the Los Angeles Times called it "a movie to be listened to with well-nigh unabashed pleasure. It is a feast of spoken language, a delight of dialogue."

Gary Arnold of The Washington Post wrote, "Although Gardner reaches for fancy, even heartrending, rhetorical effects, he lacks the lyric of social vision necessary to create something touching or pertinent out of lonely, disillusioned Nice People."

Kaspars Dzeguze wrote in Maclean's, "When a producer's first film goes through the roof with success, it's not surprising that he should look for a sequel. That's one way of explaining why George Barrie, who made the witty and urbane A Touch of Class, would bother with something as hand-me-down and derivative as Thieves."
