= Pat Corley =

American actor (1930–2006)

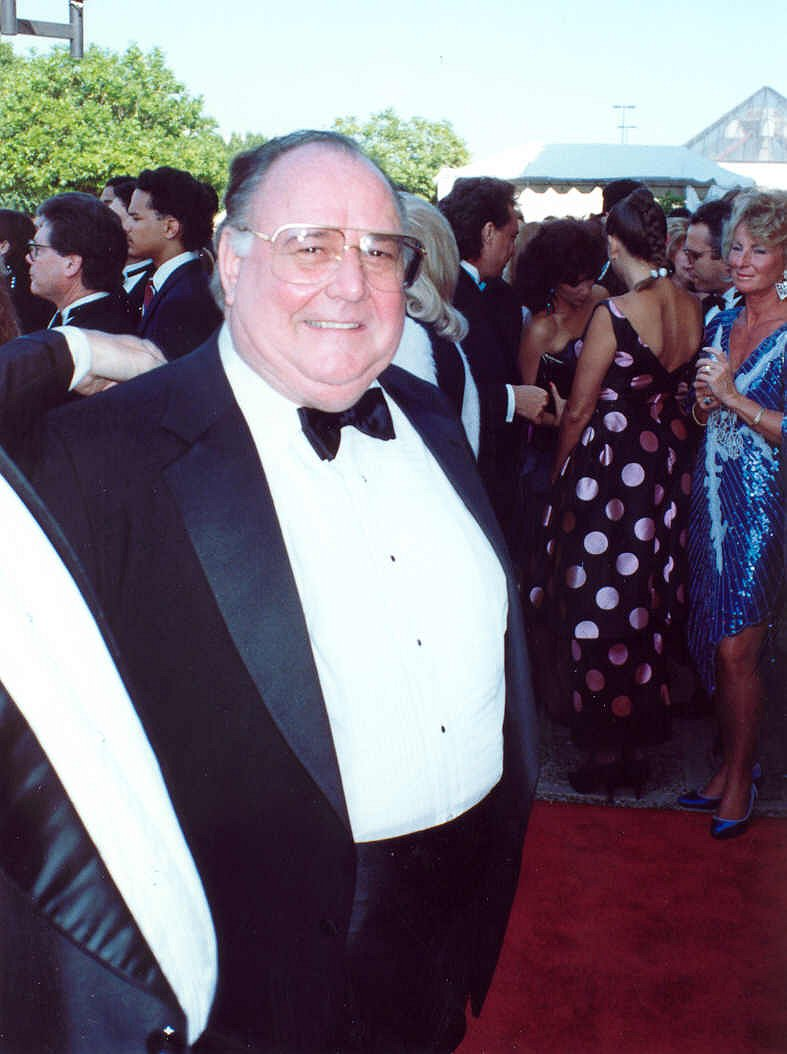
- Pat Corley at the 42nd Primetime Emmy Awards in 1990
- Born: Pat Cleo Corley; June 1, 1930; Dallas, Texas, U.S.
- Died: September 11, 2006 (aged 76); Los Angeles, California, U.S.
- Occupation: Actor
- Years active: 1974–2006
- Spouse: Iris Carter (m. 1957; died 2005)
- Children: 6

Pat Corley (June 1, 1930 – September 11, 2006), born Cleo Pat Corley, was an American actor who portrayed bar owner Phil on the CBS sitcom Murphy Brown from 1988 to 1996. He also had a recurring role as Chief Coroner Wally Nydorf on the television drama Hill Street Blues (1981–87) and supporting roles in a number of films, including Night Shift (1982), Against All Odds (1984), and Mr. Destiny (1990).

== Early life ==
Cleo Pat Corley was born in Dallas, Texas, on June 1, 1930, the son of Ada Lee (née Martin) and R.L. Corley. He got his start in the entertainment business as a teenage ballet dancer for the Stockton Ballet where he performed for three seasons. While serving in the U.S. Army during the Korean War, Corley helped put on entertainment shows for the brass while stationed in France. After his honourable discharge, he entered Stockton College on the G.I. Bill where he met his future second wife, Iris Carter, a younger student, champion debater and a locally acclaimed actress.

== Career ==
After moving to New York City he worked as a waiter, attended the American Theatre Wing, studied under Uta Hagen and auditioned for plays. Corley and his wife toured in summer stock in Indiana and New Jersey with his young daughter Troy in tow. His first Broadway appearance was in James Baldwin's Blues for Mr. Charlie, a production by the Actors Studio, where Corley had been accepted as a member. Early in his career he shared the stage with future stars Al Pacino and James Earl Jones in the Off-Broadway play The Peace Creeps. In the 1970s, Corley appeared in several Broadway productions including Of Mice and Men with James Earl Jones and Sweet Bird of Youth with Christopher Walken.

Corley's Hollywood career began in 1969 in TV with a small role in N.Y.P.D. and a few television commercials. His first feature film roles were in Gordon Parks' The Super Cops and the comedy Law and Disorder with Carroll O'Connor and Ernest Borgnine. He also appeared in Coming Home and in an early Oliver Stone feature, The Hand, with Michael Caine.

Corley appeared on dozens of TV shows, among the earliest of which were: The Wackiest Ship in the Army, Get Christie Love and Kojak. Other series on which Corley has guest-starred include Starsky and Hutch, Barnaby Jones, Hill Street Blues, Hart to Hart, St. Elsewhere, Simon & Simon, Murder, She Wrote, Magnum, P.I., Cagney & Lacey, Night Court, Moonlighting, L.A. Law, and Hey Arnold!. Corley also had roles in two mini-series, Roots and Fresno. He provided the voice of Sheriff McGee in Tom Sawyer (2000).

== Death ==
Corley died of heart failure at Cedars-Sinai Medical Center in Los Angeles on September 11, 2006, at age 76. His wife, actress Iris Corley, had died the year prior.

== Filmography ==
- The Super Cops (1974) as Captain Bush
- Law and Disorder (1974) as Ken
- Get Christie Love! (1974, TV Series, Episode: Highway to Murder)
- Kojak (1974, TV Series, Episode: "Cross Your Heart and Hope to Die") as Mr. Miller
- Delvecchio (1976, TV Series, episode "Numbers") as Manny
- The Blue Knight (1974, TV Series, episode: "Throwaway") as The Man
- Roots (1977, TV Mini-Series) as Referee
- Audrey Rose (1977) as Dr. Webster
- Martinelli, Outside Man (1977, TV Movie) as Sally
- Alexander: The Other Side of Dawn (1977, TV Movie) as Marty
- The Quinns (1977, TV Movie) as Eugene Carmody
- The Bad News Bears in Breaking Training (1977) as Morrie Slaytor
- The Betty White Show (1977, TV Series, Episode: "Mitzi's Cousin") as TV Repairman
- The Night They Took Miss Beautiful (1977, TV Movie) as Roman
- Barnaby Jones (1977-1980, TV Series) as Sid Markham / Sam Powell
- Coming Home (1978) as Harris
- A Death in Canaan (1978, TV Series) as Judge Vincent
- Starsky and Hutch (1978, TV Series, Episode: "Moonshine") as Ben Meadows
- The Paper Chase (1978, TV Series, Episode: "The Seating Chart") as Plumber
- The Amazing Spider-Man (1978, TV Series, Episode: "The Con Caper") as IFMM receptionist
- And I Alone Survived (1978, TV Movie) as Kaminsky
- Family (1979, TV Series) as "Driver" / "Umpire"
- The Best Place To Be (1979, TV Movie)
- Nightwing (1979) as Vet
- The Onion Field (1979) as Jimmy's Lawyer #2
- Diary of a Teenage Hitchhiker (1979, TV Movie)
- Flesh and Blood (1979, TV Movie)
- The Last Word (1979) as Chief Norris
- The Two Worlds of Jennie Logan (1979, TV Movie) as Realtor
- The Rose (1979) as Police Chief Morrison
- The Gift (1979, TV Movie)
- The Waltons (1980, TV Series, Episode: "The Idol") as The Bartender
- Lou Grant (1979-1980, TV Series) as Organizer
- The Black Marble (1980) as Itchy Mitch
- City In Fear (1980, TV Movie) as Supermarket Manager
- On the Nickel (1980)
- Loving Couples (1980) as Delmonico Clerk
- Act of Love (1980, TV Movie) as Sgt. Waterson
- Mark, I Love You (1980, TV Movie) as Bucky Sims
- The Hand (1981) as Sheriff
- The Best Little Girl in the World (1981, TV Movie) as Store Manager
- True Confessions (1981) as Sonny McDonough
- Callie and Son (1981, TV Movie) as Deputy Sheriff
- Mr. Merlin (1981, TV Series, Episode: "The Cloning of The Green") as Roy Oakland
- Of Mice and Men (1981, TV Movie) as Carlson
- Darkroom (1981, TV Series, Episode: "Siege of 31 August") as Colonel / Sheriff
- Hart To Hart (1981, TV Series, Episode "The Hartbreak Kid") as Monty
- Flamingo Road (1982, TV Series, Episode: "Old Friends")
- McClain's Law (1982, TV Series, Episode: "What Patrick Doesn’t Know")
- House Calls (1982, TV Series, Episode: "Ducks of Hazzard")
- Hanky Panky (1982) as Pilot
- Kiss My Grits (1982) as Sheriff Joe Cozy
- Night Shift (1982) as Edward Koogle
- The Executioner's Song (1982, TV Movie) as Val Conlan
- Cagney & Lacey (1982-1988, TV Series) as Sheriff Craddock / Tom
- Hill Street Blues (1982–1986, TV Series) as Coroner Wally Nydorf
- The Powers of Matthew Star (1983, TV Series, Episode: "Matthew Star D.O.A") as Donzelli
- St. Elsewhere (1983, TV Series, Episode: "Release") as Norman Wyler
- The Fall Guy (1983, TV Series, Episode: "Spaced out") as Sheriff Nick Baker
- Starflight: The Plane That Couldn't Land (1983, TV Movie) as Joe Pedowski
- I Want To Live (1983, TV Movie) as Bartender
- Curse of the Pink Panther (1983) as Lt. Palmyra
- Bay City Blues (1983-1984, TV Series) as Ray Holtz
- Against All Odds (1984) as Ed Phillips
- Calendar Girl Murders (1984, TV Movie) as Lt. Tony
- Domestic Life (1984, TV Movie) as Coach
- Scorned and Swindled (1984, TV Movie) as Ty Jenkins
- Hawaiian Heat (1984, TV Series, Episode: "Missing In Hawaii") as Charlie
- Simon & Simon (1984-1987) as Sheriff Brian McKenzie / Don Burton / Mayor K.K. Drinkman
- Robert Kennedy & His Times (1985, TV Mini-Series) as Andy McLaughlin
- Scarecrow and Mrs. King (1985, TV Series, Episode "A Little Sex, A Little Scandal") as Detective Tuggey
- Moonlighting (1985, TV Series) as Farley Wrye / Frankie Tate
- Stormin' Home (1985, TV Movie) as Broker
- Stark (1985, TV Movie) as Wichita Police Chief Waldron
- Hardcastle and McCormick (1985, TV Series, Episode: "She Ain't Deep But She Sure Runs Fast") as Buzz Bird
- Silent Witness (1985, TV Movie) as Brad Huffman
- Murder, She Wrote (1986, TV Series, Episode: "Powder Keg") as Frank Kelso
- Magnum, P.I. (1986, TV Series, Episode: "A Little Bit of Luck...A Little Bit of Grief") as Dennis Mackenzie
- Joe Bash (1986, TV Series, Episode: "Tour of Duty") as Ernest Janowitz
- Stark: Mirror Image (1986, TV Movie) as Wichita Police Chief Waldron
- Falcon Crest (1986, TV Series, Episode: "The Stranger Within") as James Saunders
- Fresno (1986, TV Mini-Series) as Earl Duke
- A Year in the Life (1986, TV Mini-Series) as George Bilzarian
- The Christmas Gift (1986, TV Movie) as Bud Sawyer
- He's the Mayor (1986, TV Series) as Chief Walter Padget
- The Stepford Children (1987, TV Movie) as Sheriff Weston
- L.A. Law (1987, TV Series, Episode: "Pigmallion") as Uncle Willard Sabrett
- Poker Alice (1987, TV Movie) as Mccarthy
- CBS Summer Playhouse (1987, TV Series, Episode: "Day to Day") as Bob
- Mr. Belvedere (1988, TV Series, Episode: "Commentary") as Mr. Franklin
- J.J. Starbuck (1988, TV Series, Episode: "Cactus Jack’s Last Call") as Cactus Jack
- Night Court (1988, TV Series, Episode "Another Day in the Life") as Otis Edwards
- Murphy Brown (1988-1998, TV Series) as Phil the Bartender
- Mr. Destiny (1990) as Harry Burrows
- In Defense of a Married Man (1990, TV Movie) as Det. Brendan Bradley
- Carol Leifer: Gaudy, Bawdy, and Blue (1992, TV Movie) as Lucky Herb
- Saved by the Bell: Wedding in Las Vegas (1994, TV Movie) as Sheriff Myron Thorpe
- Murder One (1995, TV Movie, Episode: "Chapter Four") as Marvin Siegalstein
- All Dogs Go to Heaven 2 (1996) as Officer McDowell (voice)
- Coach (1997, TV Series, Episode: "It’s a Swamp Thing") as Jeb
- When Time Expires (1997, TV Movie) as TV car salesman, Becks Interface
- Walking Across Egypt (1999) as Sheriff Tillman
- Tom Sawyer (2000) as Sheriff McGee (voice)
- Hey Arnold! (2002, TV Series, Episode: On the Lam/Family Man) as Mr. Camacho (voice)
- Purgatory Flats (2003) as Roy
- Come Early Morning (2006) as Papa (final film role)
