= Law and Disorder (1974 film) =

1974 film by Ivan Passer

- Theatrical release poster
- Directed by: Ivan Passer
- Written by: Tzvi Fishman (as Kenneth Harris Fishman); Ivan Passer; William Richert
- Produced by: Fred C. Caruso; Michael Medwin; William Richert; Edgar J. Scherick; Michael Zivian; Albert Finney (uncredited)
- Starring: Carroll O'Connor; Ernest Borgnine; Ann Wedgeworth; Karen Black
- Cinematography: Arthur J. Ornitz
- Edited by: Anthony Potenza
- Music by: Angelo Badalamenti (as Andy Badale); Al Elias
- Production companies: Palomar Pictures International, Inc. Memorial Enterprises; Leroy Street
- Distributed by: Columbia Pictures
- Release date: October 9, 1974
- Running time: 101 minutes
- Country: United States
- Language: English

Law and Disorder is a 1974 American comedy-drama film directed by Ivan Passer, starring Carroll O'Connor, Ernest Borgnine, Ann Wedgeworth and Karen Black.

== Plot ==
In the crime-infested New York City of the 1970s, two residents and friends, Willie and Cy, decide to join the Auxiliary wing of the New York City Police Department to help take back their neighborhood from criminals. Willie is a taxi driver who aspires to buy a diner, while Cy is the owner of a struggling beauty salon. They are joined on the volunteer police force by their friends Bobby, Elliot, Ken and Pete.

The group are eating dinner at Cy's apartment when Willie's wife Sally phones to say that their daughter Karen has been attacked in the elevator. Karen specifies that the attacker was white just as Elliot leads a black man into Willie's apartment, believing him to be the culprit. Willie lets the man go.

The auxiliary police force gets its uniforms and gathers for its first patrol. The unit is only authorized to report suspicious activity but cannot enforce the law; Cy suggests that the restriction be ignored. Willie finds his daughter in the street with her boyfriend, Chico, and sends her home for the night. Cy apprehends a young man for smoking marijuana in the street, but when he brings him to the station he is informed by an officer that he has no grounds for arrest. Later, Cy excitedly shows Willie his new car, which is painted to look like a police car and has a working siren. Willie expresses concern that Cy is inviting trouble.

At a community meeting, a psychologist named Dr. Richter conducts a lecture on rape. Using Cy's wife Irene as a volunteer from the audience, Richter poses as a rapist and recommends she embrace him rather than resist, because a fear response will only provoke the attacker. That night, Irene rouses Cy from sleep for a bedroom role-playing session with Cy pretending to be a rapist.

Cy impresses the other members of the auxiliary force by taking them for a joyride in his fake police car. They listen to a call overheard on Cy's police band radio and activate the siren to run a red light, thrilled with their newly found power.

Willie comes home to find Karen under the influence of a drug. When confronted, Karen admits to taking a pill she received from Chico. Willie heads to the apartment of Chico's family with other members of the auxiliary force in Cy's fake police car. Willie accepts a gun from Cy but declines any further help, heading up to confront Chico himself. Willie spots Chico in the hall and chases Chico throughout the building. Meanwhile, Cy, Pete and Elliot hear a police call over the radio of an officer in trouble nearby while the car is pelted with bottles thrown from the shadows. Pete and Elliot want to leave, but Cy refuses to abandon Willie. When Cy gets out of the car, he is shot. Eddie and Pete drive off in fear. With Chico having gotten away, Willie stumbles out of the building to find Cy dead.

Willie continues to work as a taxi driver. When a posh couple impatiently berates him from the back of the cab on the way to the airport, Willie pulls over, gets out of the cab and walks back toward the city on foot.

== Cast ==
- Carroll O'Connor as Willie
- Ernest Borgnine as Cy
- Ann Wedgeworth as Sally
- Leslie Ackerman as Karen
- Karen Black as Gloria
- Jack Kehoe as Elliot
- David Spielberg as Bobby
- Joe Ragno as Pete
- Pat Corley as Ken
- Anita Dangler as Irene
- Allan Arbus as Dr. Richter
- Lionel Pena as Chico
- Rita Gam as Woman in Cab
- Michael Medwin as Man in Cab

== Reception ==
Vincent Canby of The New York Times called the film "a gentle, touching, sometimes disruptively funny movie about—among other things — ignorance, prejudice, rape, larceny, the failure of small dreams, about people trying desperately to cope and often coming apart." Gene Siskel of the Chicago Tribune gave the film two stars out of four and wrote that the film "comes on like a comedy with the mugging countenances of Carroll O'Connor and Ernest Borgnine. Then it swings into a dirge for the death of the middle-class American Dream. Those emotions never mesh, and the film fails for a reason that has more to do with the nature of television than with 'Law and Disorder' itself." Kevin Thomas of the Los Angeles Times wrote, "That this very ambitious film is marred by an unevenness of tone is far outweighed by Passer's ability to express with compassion and insight the blighted dreams of his beleaguered heroes, played superlatively by Carroll O'Connor and Ernest Borgnine." Gary Arnold of The Washington Post wrote that "Passer keeps straining for laughs, often when none are justified. The would-be funny stuff is executed in a gross, overbearing style which isn't much fun to begin with, and also destroys the sense of pathos that happens to be the film's only involving and authentic quality."

== See also ==
- List of American films of 1974
