= Fred C. Caruso =

American film producer

- Born: United States
- Occupation: Film producer

Fred C. Caruso is an American film producer known for his work on such films as Network and Blue Velvet.

His contributions as a producer for the film version of The Bonfire of the Vanities with director Brian De Palma were detailed in Julie Salamon's 1991 non-fiction book The Devil's Candy.

== Selected filmography ==
He was a producer in all films unless otherwise noted.

=== Film ===
| Year | Film | Credit | Notes |
|---|---|---|---|
| 1971 | Who Is Harry Kellerman and Why Is He Saying Those Terrible Things About Me? | Associate producer | |
| 1974 | Law and Disorder | Associate producer | |
| 1975 | The Happy Hooker | | |
| 1976 | Network | Associate producer | |
| 1977 | Andy Warhol's Bad | Associate producer | |
| 1979 | Winter Kills | | |
| 1979 | The Wanderers | Associate producer | |
| 1980 | Union City | Line producer | Uncredited |
| 1980 | Dressed to Kill | Associate producer | |
| 1980 | The First Deadly Sin | Associate producer | |
| 1981 | Blow Out | Executive producer | |
| 1986 | Blue Velvet | | |
| 1988 | The Presidio | Co-producer | |
| 1989 | Casualties of War | Co-producer | |
| 1989 | We're No Angels | Co-producer | |
| 1990 | The Bonfire of the Vanities | Co-producer | |
| 1993 | Super Mario Bros. | Co-producer | |
| 1994 | Surviving the Game | Co-producer | |
| 1994 | The Life and Times of Charlie Putz | Executive producer | |
| 1995 | Steal Big Steal Little | | |
| 1997 | Telling Lies in America | Co-producer | |
| 1997 | An Alan Smithee Film: Burn Hollywood Burn | Co-producer | |
| 2000 | The Skulls | Co-producer | |
| 2002 | Deuces Wild | | |
| 2004 | The Eavesdropper | Consulting producer | |
| 2010 | Pizza with Bullets | Executive producer | |
| 2012 | 9-Ball | Executive producer | |
| 2012 | Destination Fame | Executive producer | Direct-to-video |
| 2019 | Wetlands | Producer | |

Production manager

| Year | Film | Role |
|---|---|---|
| 1969 | Midnight Cowboy | Assistant production manager |
| 1970 | The Magic Garden of Stanley Sweetheart | Production manager |
| 1970 | Husbands | Production supervisor |
| 1971 | Who Is Harry Kellerman and Why Is He Saying Those Terrible Things About Me? | Production manager |
| 1972 | The Valachi Papers | Production manager |
| 1972 | The Godfather | Unit production manager: Oaktree Productions |
| 1972 | The Stoolie | Production manager |
| 1974 | Claudine | Production manager |
| 1974 | Law and Disorder | Production manager |
| 1975 | The Happy Hooker | Production supervisor |
| 1978 | King of the Gypsies | Executive in charge of production |
| 1979 | The Wanderers | Unit production manager |
| 1980 | Dressed to Kill | Production manager |
| 1980 | The First Deadly Sin | Unit production manager |
| 1981 | Blow Out | Production manager |
| 1982 | Fighting Back | Unit production manager |
| 1984 | Once Upon a Time in America | Executive in charge of production |
| 1985 | Year of the Dragon | Executive in charge of production Unit production manager |
| 1986 | Raw Deal | Production manager |
| 1986 | Blue Velvet | Production manager |
| 1987 | Beverly Hills Cop II | Unit production manager |
| 1988 | The Presidio | Unit production manager |
| 1989 | Casualties of War | Unit production manager |
| 1993 | Super Mario Bros. | Unit production manager |
| 1994 | Surviving the Game | Unit production manager |
| 2010 | Pizza with Bullets | Production manager |
| 2015 | The Painting: The Art of Slaying | Production manager |

As an actor

| Year | Film | Role | Notes |
|---|---|---|---|
| 1986 | Blue Velvet | The Ear | Uncredited |

Thanks

| Year | Film | Role |
|---|---|---|
| 2019 | The Steed | The producers wish to thank |

=== Television ===
| Year | Title | Notes |
|---|---|---|
| 1981 | Today's F.B.I. | |
| 1998 | The Rat Pack | Television film |
| 1999 | Lansky | Television film |
| 2002 | Point of Origin | Television film |

Production manager

| Year | Title | Role | Notes |
|---|---|---|---|
| 1968 | The Thanksgiving Visitor | Production manager | Television film |
| 1973 | The Man Without a Country | Production supervisor | Television film |
