= Barry Gordon =

American actor, singer, political candidate, and presenter (born 1948)

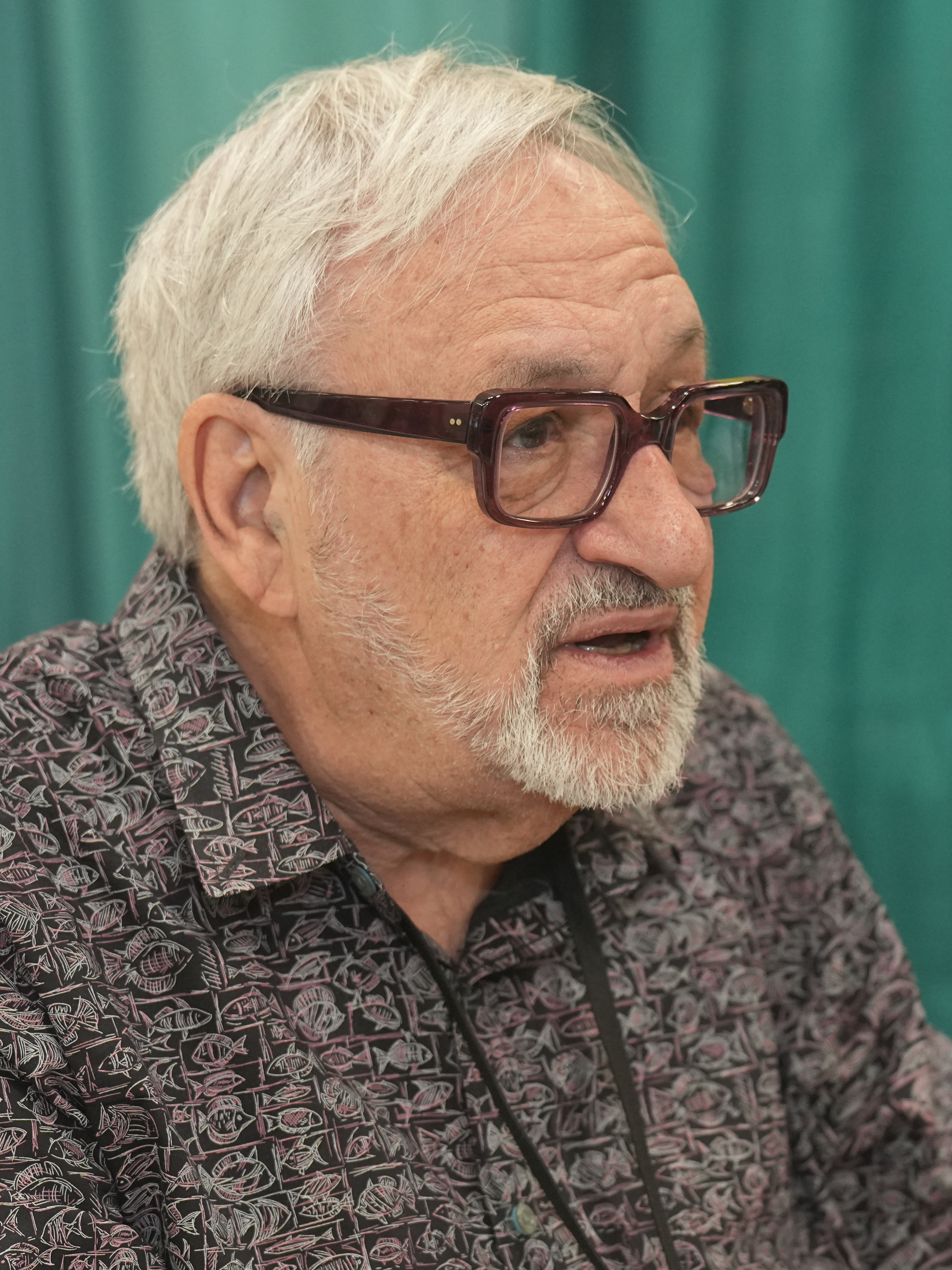
- Gordon in 2024
- Born: December 21, 1948 (age 77); Brookline, Massachusetts, U.S.
- Occupations: Actor; talk show host
- Years active: 1951–present
- Spouse(s): Sally Julian (divorced) Gail Schaper (m. 1993)
- Children: 2

President of the Screen Actors Guild
- In office April 13, 1988 – July 11, 1995
- Preceded by: Patty Duke
- Succeeded by: Richard Masur

Barry Gordon (born December 21, 1948) is an American actor and political talk show host. He was the longest-serving president of the Screen Actors Guild, having served from 1988 to 1995. He is perhaps best known as the original voice of Donatello and Bebop in the Teenage Mutant Ninja Turtles franchise. He was nominated for the Tony Award for Best Featured Actor in a Play in 1963 for his performance in A Thousand Clowns.

== Early life ==
Gordon was born in Brookline, Massachusetts, United States. Gordon is Jewish. His stepfather, Bob Manning, was a crooner of popular love songs in the 1940s and 1950s, most known for his rendition of Hoagy Carmichael's "The Nearness of You".

== Acting ==
=== Childhood career ===
Gordon began performing at age three; in his television debut, he won second place on Ted Mack's Amateur Hour singing Johnnie Ray's "Cry". At six, Gordon recorded "Nuttin' for Christmas". He was the youngest performer to hit a pre-Hot 100 Billboard chart when that song hit No. 6 in 1955. It sold over one million copies, and was awarded a gold disc. The next year, he charted his second and final single "Rock Around Mother Goose". In circa 1956, Bill Haley recorded a private demo recording "Six Year Olds Can Rock and Roll". He begins the recording (released in 1990) by dedicating it to Barry Gordon.

As a child actor, Gordon also appeared on The Jackie Gleason Show, The Jack Benny Program, Richard Diamond, Private Detective, The Danny Thomas Show, Alfred Hitchcock Presents and Star Time with Benny Goodman. Gordon was cast as Humberto in an episode of the sitcom Sally, starring Joan Caulfield, and as Chopper in Leave It to Beaver (episode 119: "Beaver's House Guest"). Gordon guest starred on the sitcoms The Ann Sothern Show and Dennis the Menace.

In 1962, he played the part of the childhood version of "Patient" in Pressure Point. At 13, Gordon began a career on Broadway as Nick in Herb Gardner's A Thousand Clowns, a role for which he earned a Tony Award nomination. He later reprised that role in the film version opposite Jason Robards and Martin Balsam in 1965. The film gave him "introducing" billing, but he had actually been in several films already, most notably his actual film debut in 1956's The Girl Can't Help It as a newspaper boy in which, after seeing Jayne Mansfield, he uttered the line: "If that's a girl, I don't know what my sister is."

=== Adult roles ===
As a teen, Gordon starred alongside Sid Caesar and Vera Miles in the 1967 comedy-horror film The Spirit Is Willing. In the 1970s, Gordon appeared in the Barney Miller spin-off Fish, starring Abe Vigoda, and from 1973 to 1974 was a regular on The New Dick Van Dyke Show. He also played a waiter in "Horror in the Heights", a 1974 episode of Kolchak: The Night Stalker. In 1976, he appeared in an episode of The Practice.

=== Character actor ===
Primarily as a character actor, Gordon became a familiar face in numerous feature films and television series. In the last two seasons of the sitcom Archie Bunker's Place, Gordon had the recurring role of Gary Rabinowitz, Archie's Jewish attorney and love interest of Barbara Lee "Billie" Bunker (played by Denise Miller, who had also co-starred with Gordon in Fish). Gordon also had notable guest-starring roles on Barney Miller as an embezzler, and later in season seven as an attorney, on Fish as a social worker, on Star Trek: Deep Space Nine as a Ferengi businessman, and on Star Trek: Voyager as Ardon Broht, an alien publisher. More recently, he appeared as the Rabbi in Larry David's Curb Your Enthusiasm.

=== Voice work ===
Gordon has worked extensively as a voice actor. His most notable voice roles were Donatello and Bebop in Teenage Mutant Ninja Turtles, and as Jake "Razor" Clawson in SWAT Kats: The Radical Squadron (1993). Gordon's voice was also featured in other animated series, mostly Hanna-Barbera shows such as Jabberjaw (as Clamhead), Tarzan, Lord of the Jungle, The Kid Super Power Hour with Shazam! (as Captain Marvel Jr.), Meatballs & Spaghetti (as bassist Clyde), Pac-Man (as Inky), Mighty Orbots (as Robert Simmons), Pole Position, The Jetsons, The Smurfs, The Adventures of the American Rabbit (as the titular character), Superman, Snorks (as Junior Wetworth), Gravedale High (as Reggie Moonshroud), Space Cats, A Pup Named Scooby-Doo (as Englebert Newton), Darkwing Duck (as Dr. Fossil), Tom & Jerry Kids and its spin-off Droopy, Master Detective, Batman: The Animated Series (as the Penguin's henchman Sheldrake), Aaahh!!! Real Monsters, Timon & Pumbaa, Fantastic Max, and The Pirates of Dark Water. Gordon also provided the voice of "Quicky" the Nesquik Bunny in television commercials for Nestlé.

In May 2009, Gordon played the Cocker Spaniel in the Webkinz Pet of the Month Music Video for May 2009. He reprised the roles as the original Donatello and Bebop in three seasons of Nickelodeon's Teenage Mutant Ninja Turtles.

On April 20, 2022, it was revealed that Gordon would reprise his role as Donatello for the video game, Teenage Mutant Ninja Turtles: Shredder's Revenge. This marks the first time that he would play Donatello for a video game and his first video game role in general.

== Other pursuits ==
In 1984, Gordon returned to school; he graduated summa cum laude as a political science major from California State University, Los Angeles and went on to Loyola Law School, receiving his J.D. in 1991.

Gordon became the longest-serving president of the Screen Actors Guild, holding the office for seven years.

In 1998, Gordon was the Democratic Party nominee for the United States Congress from the Pasadena, California area. He was defeated by Republican Party incumbent James Rogan.

In 2004, when the local Air America Radio affiliate in Los Angeles went off the air, for a then-unspecified period of time, Gordon started a live, call-in progressive political talk show on Pasadena's public-access television cable TV channel 56. It continues to be cablecast and webcast live.

In 2005, Gordon hosted a weekly radio talk show heard on KRLA in Los Angeles, California.

In 2006 and early 2007, Gordon hosted Barry Gordon from Left Field, a weekly talk show broadcast throughout the 25th largest U.S. radio market—the San Bernardino/Riverside region of Southern California—on KCAA Radio in Loma Linda, California. With live streams and podcast archives, the show was notable for featuring nationally known guests, including senators, congressmen, bestselling authors, and entertainment figures.

Since 2007, Gordon has taught courses in politics and the media at the California State University, Los Angeles.

In 2008, Gordon debuted his daily Internet talk show Left Talk on BlogTalkRadio.

== Personal life ==
Gordon's first marriage to Sally Julian, a television host, ended in divorce. He married Gail Schaper, a business psychologist, in 1993; they have two children.

== Filmography ==
=== Film ===
- The Girl Can't Help It (1956) - Barry the Paperboy
- Cinderfella (1960) - Young Fella
- Hands of a Stranger (1962) - Skeet
- Pressure Point (1962) - Boy Patient
- A Thousand Clowns (1965) - Nick Burns
- The Spirit Is Willing (1967) - Steve Powell
- Double-Stop (1968) - Art Student
- Out of It (1969) - Paul
- Love at First Bite (1979) - Flashlight Vendor
- Gallavants (1984) - Edil, Bok, Gank (voices)
- The Adventures of the American Rabbit (1986) - American Rabbit, Rob, Punk Jackal (voices)
- Body Slam (1986) - Sheldon Brockmeister
- Repairs (1987) - Lew the Studio Exex
- Grüne Wüste (1999) - Alex
- Losing Control (2011) - Frank

=== Television ===
- The Jack Benny Program (1954–1961) - Child Jack Benny, Harry Johnson
- The Danny Thomas Show (1956) - Herbie
- Sally (1957) - Humberto
- The Ann Sothern Show (1958) - Donald Carpenter
- General Electric Theater (1959) - Etienne
- Richard Diamond, Private Detective (1959) - Tommy
- Start Time (1959) - Larry
- Alfred Hitchcock Presents (1960) (Season 5 Episode 20: "The Day of the Bullet") - Ignace 'Iggy' Kovacs
- Philip Marlowe (1960) - Jamie
- Leave It to Beaver (1960) - Chopper Cooper
- Alfred Hitchcock Presents (1960) (Season 6 Episode 4: "The Contest for Aaron Gold") - Aaron Gold
- Dennis the Menace (1960) - Buzzy Hanson
- Thriller (1961) - Slip-Slip
- The DuPont Show with June Allyson (1961) - Pepe
- Dr. Kildare (1961) - Billy Hoffman
- Arrest and Trial (1963) - Bobby Randolph
- Summer Playhouse (1964) - Kid
- The Smothers Brothers Show (1966) - Lester
- Love, American Style (1969) - Bill
- The Don Rickles Show (1972) - Conrad Musk
- The New Dick Van Dyke Show (1973–1974) - Dennis Whitehead
- Mannix (1974) - Todd Corvin
- Kolchak: The Night Stalker (1974) - Barry the Waiter
- The Bob Crane Show (1975) - Gordon
- Good Heavens (1976) - Harold
- Jabberjaw (1976) - Clamhead (voice)
- The Practice (1976) - Dr. Byron Fisk
- Tarzan, Lord of the Jungle (1976–1979) - Additional voices
- Fish (1977–1978) - Charlie Harrison
- The Incredible Hulk (1979) - Harold Milburn
- Supertrain (1979) - Billy
- Barney Miller (1979–1982) - David Fingler, Stanley Fine
- Three's Company (1980) - Gilbert Larwin
- Mr. & Mrs. Dracula (1980) - Cousin Anton
- Good Time Harry (1980) - Stan
- I'm a Big Girl Now (1981) - Jerry
- The Kid Super Power Hour with Shazam! (1981) - Freddy Freeman / Captain Marvel Jr. (voice)
- Warp Speed (1981) - David Ingalls
- Time Warp (1981) - M.U.D. (voice)
- The Perfect Woman (1981) - Emo
- Archie Bunker's Place (1981–1983) - Gary Rabinowitz
- Christmas Comes to Pac-Land (1982) - Inky (voice)
- Meatballs & Spaghetti (1982–1983) - Clyde (voice)
- Pac-Man (1982–1983) - Inky (voice)
- Mighty Orbots (1984) - Robert Simmons (voice)
- Gallavants (1984) - Edil, Bok, Gauk (voice)
- Pole Position (1984) - Additional voices
- Snorks (1984–1988) - Junior Wetworth (voice)
- The Jetsons (1985) - Tiny Terror, Betting Machine, Lenny Lase, Mechanic, Sneak (voices)
- The Smurfs (1985) - The Gamemaster, Additional voices
- Stark: Mirror Image (1986) - Lee Vogel
- Throb (1987) - Josh
- Teenage Mutant Ninja Turtles (1987–1996) - Donatello, Bebop, Additional voices
- Superman (1988) - Additional voices
- CBS Summer Playhouse (1988) - Newton Hobbs
- A Family for Joe (1990) - Roger Hightower
- His & Hers (1990) - Bruno Chernak
- Gravedale High (1990) - Reggie Moonshroud (voice)
- Darkwing Duck (1991) - Dr. Fossil (voice)
- Space Cats (1991) - Incidental characters (voices)
- A Pup Named Scooby-Doo (1991) - Englebert Newton (voice)
- Civil Wars (1992–1993) - Mel Wittnauer
- Tom & Jerry Kids (1992) - Additional voices
- Star Trek: Deep Space Nine (1993) - Nava
- L.A. Law (1993–1994) - Seth Shumay
- Droopy, Master Detective (1993) - Additional voices
- Batman: The Animated Series (1993) - Sheldrake (voice)
- SWAT Kats: The Radical Squadron (1993–1995) - Jake "Razor" Clawson, Evil Razor (voices)
- NYPD Blue (1994–2000) - Preston Ross, Dr. Berger, Philip Fox
- Empty Nest (1995) - Earl
- The Pink Panther (1995) - Bongo Cereal Founder (voice)
- Aaahh!!! Real Monsters (1997) - Nerdy Monster, Korbutokov (voices)
- Over the Top (1997) - Marty
- Caroline in the City (1998) - Rabbi Katz
- Arli$$ (1999) - Doctor
- The Hughleys (1999–2000) - The Judge
- Star Trek: Voyager (2001) - Ardon Broht
- Becker (2002) - Mr. Levin
- Dragnet (2003) - Alan Sperry
- Curb Your Enthusiasm (2004–2005) - Rabbi
- Brothers & Sisters (2011) - Rabbi
- Teenage Mutant Ninja Turtles (2012–2017) - '87 Donatello, '87 Bebop (voices)
- Forked Up (2015) - Mr. Goodman
- NewsRap (2018–2019) - Host

=== Video games ===
- Teenage Mutant Ninja Turtles: Shredder's Revenge - Donatello, Bebop
- Nickelodeon Kart Racers 3: Slime Speedway - Donatello
- Nickelodeon All-Star Brawl 2 - Donatello

== Discography ==
=== Albums ===
- Bright Idea / A Fairy Tale (1965) - Attributed to Richard Hoh, Liz Seneff & Barry Gordon
- Yes Sir, That's My Baby (1966)
- Pieces Of Time (1971)
- Distant Songs (1989)
- Santa Swings (1997)
- The World Is Mine / The Pop Recordings 1964-1971 (2019) (compilation album)

=== Singles & EPs ===
- "I Can't Whistle" (1956)
- "Rock Around Mother Goose" (1956)
- "Rock Little Chillun" (1956)
- "10 Years To Go" (1956)
- "I Like Christmas (I Like It, I Like It)" / "Zoomah, The Santa Claus From Mars" (1956)
- "Yes! We Have No Bananas" / "The Thief" (1957)
- "They" / "Katy" (1958)
- "Rabbit Habit" / "The Bluebird Song" (1958)
- "She's Got Soul" (1961)
- "You Can't Lie to a Liar" / "You Can't See The Trees (For The Forest)" (1962)
- "Go Back Little Tear" (1964)
- "Sealed With A Kiss" (1965)
- "Let Me Try" (1965)
- "True Love Can Never Die" (1965)
- "Angelica" (1967)
- "The Girl I Left Behind" / "A House Built on Sand" (1968)
- "The Days of Pearly Spencer" (1968)
- "You Can't Love A Child Like A Woman" (1969)
