= Jack Kehoe =

American actor (1934–2020)

- Born: November 21, 1934; New York City, U.S.
- Died: January 14, 2020 (aged 85); Los Angeles, California, U.S.
- Occupation: Actor
- Years active: 1963–1997
- Partner: Sherry Smith (1980-2020)

Jack Kehoe (November 21, 1934 – January 14, 2020) was an American film actor appearing in a wide variety of films, including the crime dramas Serpico (1973), The Sting (1973), The Pope of Greenwich Village (1984) and Brian De Palma's The Untouchables (1987), as well as the cult favorites The Friends of Eddie Coyle (1973), Car Wash (1976) and Midnight Run (1988), the popular Western Young Guns II (1990), and On the Nickel (1980).

Kehoe was born in Astoria, New York. After serving in the 101st Airborne Division of the United States Army, he studied acting under Stella Adler.

On Broadway, Kehoe appeared in The Ballad of the Sad Cafe (1963) and The Basic Training of Pavlo Hummel (1977).

Kehoe appeared in several Academy Award-winning films, including Jonathan Demme's Melvin and Howard (1980) and Best Picture winner The Sting (1973), in which Kehoe appears as grifter Joe Erie, alias The Erie Kid. His various TV credits included roles in The Twilight Zone, Murder, She Wrote and Miami Vice.

After appearing alongside Michael Douglas in David Fincher's The Game (1997), Kehoe retired. One of the few interviews he gave during his career was conducted for a 1974 issue of New York Magazine in which Kehoe discussed (among several topics) his outlook on Hollywood.

Kehoe died on January 14, 2020, after a stroke, aged 85. He left behind his partner of 40 years, Sherry Smith. She and Kehoe had no children. He is interred in the Forest Lawn Memorial Park.

== Filmography ==
- The Gang That Couldn't Shoot Straight (1971) as Bartender
- The Friends of Eddie Coyle (1973) as The Beard
- Serpico (1973) as Tom Keough
- The Sting (1973) as Erie Kid
- Law and Disorder (1974) as Elliott
- Car Wash (1976) as Scruggs
- The Fish That Saved Pittsburgh (1979) as Setshot
- On the Nickel (1980) as Bad Mood
- Melvin and Howard (1980) as Jim Delgado
- Reds (1981) as Eddie
- The Ballad of Gregorio Cortez (1982) as Prosecutor Pierson
- The Star Chamber (1983) as Hingle
- Two of a Kind (1983) as Mr. Chotiner
- The Pope of Greenwich Village (1984) as Bunky
- The Wild Life (1984) as Mr. Parker
- The Killers (1984) as Harry
- Flight of the Spruce Goose (1986) as Freddie Fletcher
- The Little Sister (1986) as Nikos
- The Untouchables (1987) as Walter Payne
- D.O.A. (1988) as Detective Brockton
- Midnight Run (1988) as Jerry Geisler
- Dick Tracy (1990) as Customer at Raid
- Young Guns II (1990) as Ashmun Upson
- Servants of Twilight (1991) as Dr. Denton Boothe
- Falling Down (1993) as Street Worker
- The Paper (1994) as Phil
- Gospel According to Harry (1994) as Harry
- The Game (1997) as Lieutenant Sullivan
