= Tamango =

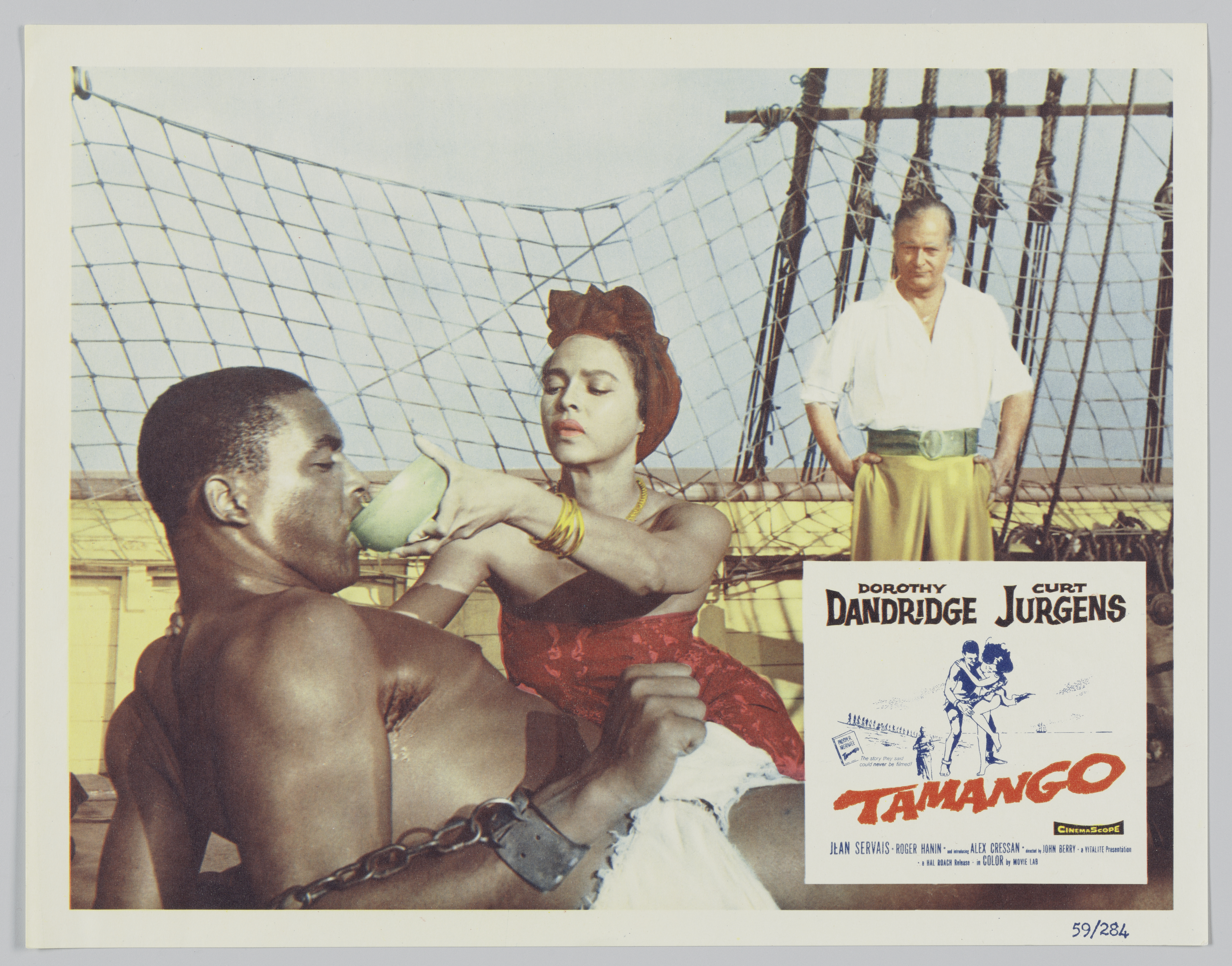
- Lobby card
- Directed by: John Berry
- Written by: John Berry; Lee Gold; Tamara Hovey; Georges Neveux (dialogue)
- Based on: Tamango; 1829 novella by Prosper Mérimée
- Produced by: Adry De Carbuccia; Roland Girard; Sig Shore
- Starring: Dorothy Dandridge; Curd Jürgens; Alex Cressan; Jean Servais
- Cinematography: Edmond Séchan
- Edited by: Roger Dwyre
- Music by: Joseph Kosma
- Distributed by: CEI Incom
- Release dates: January 24, 1958 (France); September 16, 1959 (official United States release date)
- Running time: 98 minutes
- Countries: Italy; France
- Language: English/French

Tamango is a 1958 French/Italian film directed by John Berry, a blacklisted American director who exiled himself to Europe. The film stars Dorothy Dandridge, Curd Jürgens, Alex Cressan and Jean Servais.

Based on a short story written by Prosper Mérimée that was first published in 1829, the film concerns a slave ship on its crossing from Africa to Cuba, the various people that it carries and the slaves' rebellion while on board.

== Plot ==
Captain Reiker, a Dutch sea captain, embarks on what he intends to be his last slave-ship voyage. After buying slaves from an African chief, Reiker starts his voyage for Cuba. Along with the slaves below deck, the passengers include his mistress, the slave Aiché, and the ship's doctor, Corot. Tamango, one of the captured men, plans a revolt and tries to persuade Aiché to join him and the other slaves. When the captured slaves rebel, Tamango holds Aiché hostage. A deadlock between the two sides develops and Captain Reiker states that he will fire a cannon into the ship's hold and kill all the slaves unless they surrender. Aiché is given a chance to leave by Tamango, but after looking up the ladder that leads out of the hold, she chooses to stay with her fellow slaves. The captain fulfills his threat and shoots the cannon into the hold.

== Controversy ==
The film was controversial in different parts of the world. Although the project was filmed in the French city of Nice, France banned Tamango in its West African colonies "for fear it would cause dissent among the natives." The film was released in 1959 in New York City but did not receive nationwide distribution until 1962, as it ran afoul of the Hays Code restriction on scenes depicting sexual relations between members of different ethnic groups.

== Cast ==
- Dorothy Dandridge as Aiché, Reiker's mistress
- Curd Jürgens as Captain John Reiker
- Jean Servais as Doctor Corot
- Alex Cressan as Tamango
- Roger Hanin as 1st Mate Bebe
- Guy Mairesse as Werner
- Clément Harari as Cook
- Doudou Babet as Chadi
- Habib Benglia as Le chef noir
- Pierre Rosso as the diving sailor
