= He Ran All the Way =

1951 film by John Berry

- Theatrical release poster
- Directed by: John Berry
- Screenplay by: Hugo Butler; Dalton Trumbo
- Based on: He Ran All the Way; 1947 novel by Sam Ross
- Produced by: Bob Roberts
- Starring: John Garfield; Shelley Winters; Wallace Ford; Selena Royle; Bobby Hyatt
- Cinematography: James Wong Howe
- Edited by: Francis D. Lyon
- Music by: Franz Waxman
- Production company: Roberts Pictures
- Distributed by: United Artists
- Release date: June 20, 1951 (New York)
- Running time: 78 minutes
- Country: United States
- Language: English
- Box office: $1 million

He Ran All the Way is a 1951 American crime drama film noir directed by John Berry and starring John Garfield and Shelley Winters. Distributed by United Artists, it was produced independently by Roberts Pictures, a company named for Garfield's manager and business partner Bob Roberts, and bankrolled by Garfield. It was Garfield's final film before his death in 1952 at the age of 39.

== Plot ==
Petty thief Nick Robey botches a robbery, shooting and killing a policeman and leaving his partner Al severely wounded. Nick escapes with more than $10,000 and, deliberately losing himself in the crowd, arrives at a local swimming pool, where he meets bakery worker Peg Dobbs. She invites him to her family's apartment. When Peg's mother, father and young brother return from the cinema, Robey takes the family hostage at gunpoint.

As a manhunt for Nick begins outside, he becomes increasingly paranoid. Peg's initial attraction to him is replaced by fear. Her mother and father plead with Nick to leave, but he refuses. He permits Mr. Dobbs to leave for work, warning him of the consequences should the police be contacted. Peg continues to work at the bakery, and her father implores her to stay elsewhere, but she returns later that night. At Nick's demand, Peg phones his mother from work, asking her to meet Nick to give her some money, but Nick's mother refuses. Peg agrees to accompany Nick when he flees and he gives her $1,500 to buy a new car.

The next day, Nick argues with Mr. Dobbs, who insists that Peg will not buy the car. When Peg returns without the car because its headlights need repair, Nick doubts her story. She insists that the car will be delivered to the front door after the dealer has completed the repairs. After attending Sunday church services, Mrs. Dobbs takes her son to the police station, where she describes the situation.

Nick notices that the neighborhood is quiet and becomes scared that the police are outside. Nick violently takes Peg down the stairs toward the exit, terrifying her. Mr. Dobbs, a meek man who has become enraged at the prospect of Nick absconding with his daughter, has been waiting outside with a gun and shoots Nick. When Nick's gun drops beyond his reach and he orders Peg to hand it to him, she shoots him instead. Nick, mortally wounded, crawls outside to the curb in time to see his new car arrive, just as Peg had promised. The police arrive shortly after Nick dies.

== Cast ==
- John Garfield as Nick Robey
- Shelley Winters as Peg Dobbs
- Wallace Ford as Mr. Dobbs
- Selena Royle as Mrs. Dobbs
- Gladys George as Mrs. Robey
- Norman Lloyd as Al Molin
- Bobby Hyatt as Tommy Dobbs
- Clancy Cooper as Stan
- Vici Raaf as Marge
- Keith Hetherington as Captain of Detectives
- Robert Karnes as Police Lieutenant

== Production ==
He Ran All the Way was Garfield's final film. He had allegedly been denied roles following accusations of his involvement with the Communist Party USA. Testifying before the House Committee on Un-American Activities (HUAC), he repudiated communism, denied party membership and claimed that he did not know any members of the party during his time in Hollywood "because I was not a party member or associated in any shape, way, or form". He testified on April 23, 1951, just two months before He Ran All the Way was scheduled to open on June 19. Garfield died less than one year later on May 21, 1952 at age 39.

Communist writer Dalton Trumbo, sentenced to prison time following his conviction for contempt of Congress, had signed to write the screen adaptation of Sam Ross's novel in 1947. According to Trumbo's son Christopher, Guy Endore revised Trumbo's script, as did director John Berry. In a 1997 letter to the Writers Guild of America West, which was seeking to restore credits to allegedly blacklisted members, Trumbo's widow Cleo stated that their friend and fellow writer Hugo Butler had been asked by Trumbo to ensure that the script not be altered while he was incarcerated, and Butler restored much of the original material, adding some of his own.

When the film opened in June 1951, the screenplay was credited to Endore and Butler with John Berry credited as the director. Just prior to the premiere, Berry and Butler were subpoenaed by HUAC, and producer Bob Roberts removed their names from advertising, first in the trade press and then in the general press as the film circulated.

Trumbo was paid $5,000 and five percent of the producers' profits on the condition that the film would cost no more than $400,000, with the possibility that it might cost $100,000 less than that, but he complained to Roberts that the costs had grown to about $650,000, adding, "and that came right out of my pocket". At the end of the year, Variety estimated that He Ran All the Way would gross $1 million in the domestic market, its threshold for reporting the top-grossing films of the year. Less than a month after Garfield's death in May 1952, United Artists announced the rerelease of the film, along with that of three others, in the summer of that year.

== Reception ==
In a contemporary review for The New York Times, critic Bosley Crowther wrote:

John Garfield's stark performance of the fugitive who desperately contrives to save himself briefly from capture is full of startling glints from start to end. He makes a most odd and troubled creature, unused to the normal flow of life, unable to perceive the moral standards of decent people or the tentative advance of a good girl's love. And in Mr. Garfield's performance, vis-a-vis the rest of the cast, is conveyed a small measure of the irony and the pity that was in the book. ... But, unfortunately, the basic assumption that the fugitive could so terrorize a home that its members would keep silent about his presence, even when away from it and him, appears far-fetched in the telling. ... [I]t hardly seems reasonable that one of them would not tell the police or someone of the killer's whereabouts when allowed to go free. The device of having one hostage always remain at home is not sufficiently strong to render plausible the mute submission of members of the family when out on the street. And likewise the morbific suggestion that the daughter of the family falls fitfully in love with this strange vagrant whom she innocently brings into the household is hard to take on the basis of what is shown. ... All in all, there is shock and grim excitement in this studiously horrifying film, but it soon assumes the look of sheer theatrics when it lays its assumptions on the line.

Variety called the film "a taut gangster pic" and wrote: "Good production values keep a routine yarn fresh and appealing. Film is scripted, played and directed all the way with little waste motion, so that the suspense is steady and interest constantly sustained."

== See also ==
- List of films featuring home invasions
