= Charles Grodin =

American actor (1935–2021)

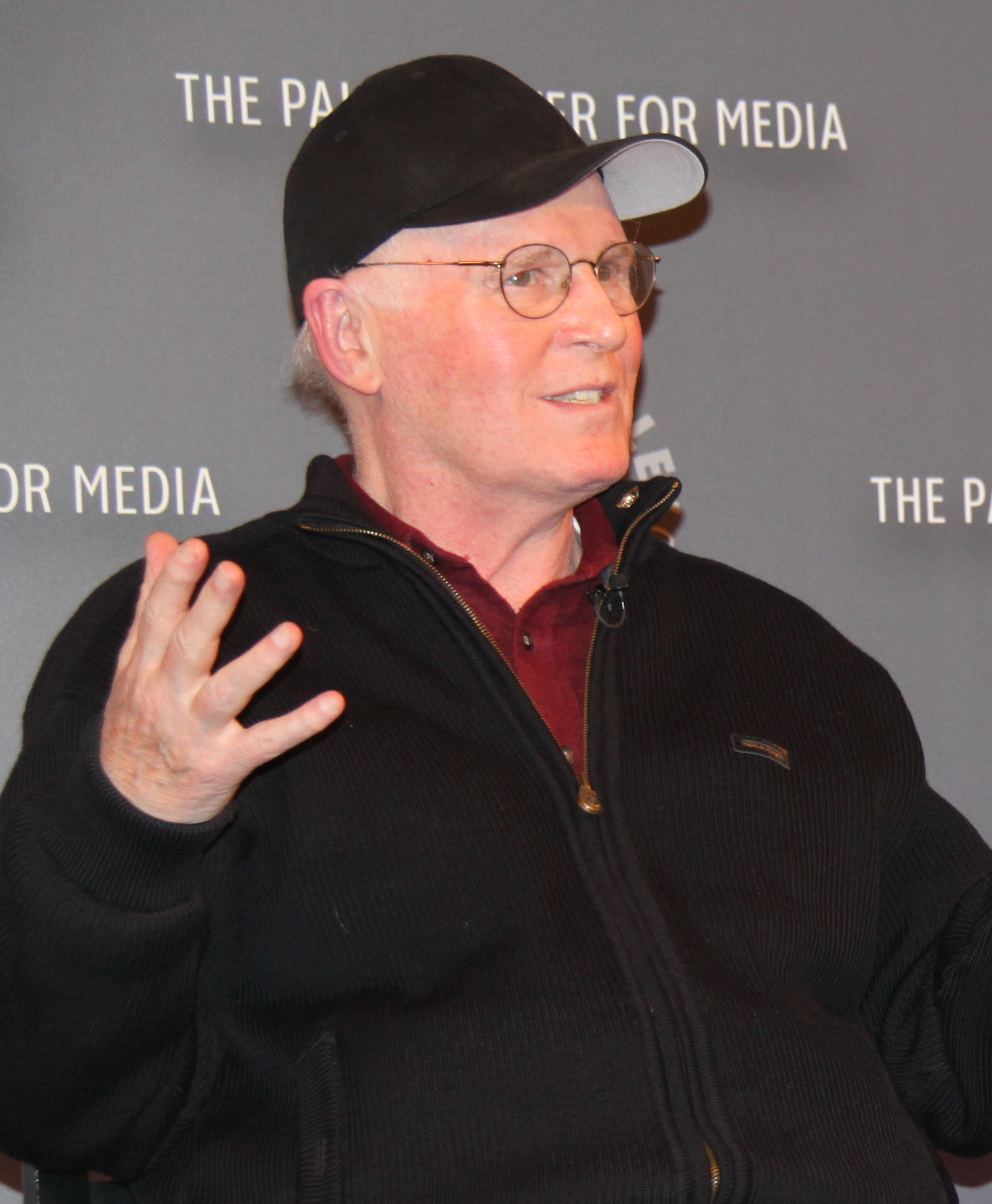
- Grodin in 2013
- Born: Charles Sidney Grodin; April 21, 1935; Pittsburgh, Pennsylvania, U.S.
- Died: May 18, 2021 (aged 86); Wilton, Connecticut, U.S.
- Occupations: Actor; author; comedian
- Years active: 1954–2017
- Known for: The Heartbreak Kid (1972); King Kong (1976); Midnight Run (1988); Beethoven (1992)
- Spouse(s): Julie Ferguson (divorced) Elissa Durwood (m. 1983)
- Children: 2

Charles Sidney Grodin (April 21, 1935 – May 18, 2021) was an American actor, comedian, author, and television talk show host. Known for his deadpan delivery and often cast as a put-upon straight man, Grodin became familiar as a supporting actor in many Hollywood comedies. After a small part in Rosemary's Baby in 1968, he played the lead in Elaine May's The Heartbreak Kid (1972) where he received a nomination for the Golden Globe Award for Best Actor – Motion Picture Musical or Comedy. Grodin also starred in 11 Harrowhouse (1974), for which he also wrote the adaptation.

Grodin achieved fame through roles in Catch-22 (1970), The Heartbreak Kid (1972) and King Kong (1976). Other notable film roles include Heaven Can Wait (1978), The Incredible Shrinking Woman, The Great Muppet Caper (both 1981), The Lonely Guy (1984), Midnight Run (1988), Taking Care of Business (1990), Beethoven (1992), and its sequel, Beethoven’s 2nd (1993).

Grodin made his acting debut in 1958 appearing in the NBC anthology series Decision. He then appeared in numerous TV serials throughout the next decade. Grodin made frequent appearances on The Tonight Show starring Johnny Carson and Late Night with David Letterman. He won the Primetime Emmy Award for Outstanding Writing for a Variety Special for the Paul Simon Special (1978) alongside Chevy Chase, Lorne Michaels, Paul Simon, and Lily Tomlin. Grodin portrayed Carl Shapiro in the miniseries Madoff (2016).

Grodin wrote eight books and three plays. He also hosted a talk show on CNBC and was a political commentator for 60 Minutes II in 2000. Grodin returned to acting in Louis C.K.'s FX show Louie and Noah Baumbach's film While We're Young (2014).

== Early life and education ==
Grodin was born in Pittsburgh on April 21, 1935, to Orthodox Jewish parents. His father, Theodore (1900–1953), owned a wholesale supplies store, while his mother, Lena (1907–1996; née Singer), worked in her husband's business and volunteered for disabled veterans. Grodin's paternal grandfather changed the family name from Grodinsky to Grodin. His maternal grandfather was an immigrant from Belarus who "came from a long line of rabbis" and moved to Baltimore at the turn of the 20th century. Grodin had an older brother named Jack.

Grodin graduated as valedictorian from Peabody High School, where he was elected class president all four years. Grodin attended the University of Miami but left without graduating to pursue acting. He studied acting at HB Studio in New York City under Uta Hagen.

== Career ==
=== Early career ===
Grodin's film debut was an uncredited bit part in Disney's 1954 film 20,000 Leagues Under the Sea. A student of Lee Strasberg and Uta Hagen, he made his Broadway debut in a production of Tchin-Tchin, opposite Anthony Quinn. In 1964, Grodin played Matt Stevens on the ABC soap opera The Young Marrieds. The following year, he became an assistant to director Gene Saks and appeared on several television series including The Virginian.

In 1966, Grodin co-wrote and directed the Broadway play Hooray! It's a Glorious Day...and All That. Around this time, he turned down the part of Benjamin Braddock in The Graduate because of the low salary offered by producer Lawrence Turman, although Turman assured Grodin that the part would make him a star, as it ultimately did for Dustin Hoffman. In 1968, Grodin had a small but pivotal part playing an obstetrician in the horror film Rosemary's Baby and directed the Broadway play Lovers and Other Strangers. He then directed his first television special, Songs of America, with Simon and Garfunkel in 1969.

=== 1970s ===
After a supporting role in the 1970 film Catch-22, Grodin gained recognition as a comedy actor with the lead role in the 1972 film The Heartbreak Kid. In 1974, he both starred in and contributed to the screenplay for 11 Harrowhouse. After that film's rocky reception, Grodin returned to New York and took over directing duties of Herb Gardner's Thieves, which ran on Broadway from 1974 to 1975.

Grodin subsequently appeared in several films during the decade, including the 1976 version of King Kong, the hit 1978 comedy Heaven Can Wait, and Albert Brooks's 1979 comedy Real Life. Alongside his work on screen, Grodin remained active on Broadway, frequently appearing in and producing several plays.

=== 1980s ===
In 1981, Grodin landed a role in The Great Muppet Caper playing Nicky Holiday, a jewel thief who falls in love with Miss Piggy. He also appeared that same year opposite Lily Tomlin in The Incredible Shrinking Woman. Grodin's 1980s roles included Neil Simon's Seems Like Old Times (opposite Chevy Chase and Goldie Hawn) and 1988's well-reviewed comedy Midnight Run, a buddy movie co-starring Robert De Niro. Grodin also appeared in the 1986 CBS prime-time-soap sendup Fresno, playing the evil son of a raisin matriarch (Carol Burnett).

Grodin's Hollywood film roles of the 1980s usually saw him cast as uptight, bland, and world-weary white collar professionals, such as a psychiatrist having a nervous breakdown (The Couch Trip), a health-conscious accountant (Midnight Run), an ineffectual advertising executive (Taking Care of Business), and a lonely, socially awkward nerd (The Lonely Guy). He was cast against this type as a scheming CIA agent in Ishtar.

Commenting on Grodin's work with regard to Ishtar, Hal Hinson in The Washington Post observed: "Grodin has a one-of-a-kind quality on the screen, a sort of inspired spinelessness. And with his cat-burglar rhythms – he seems to play all his scenes as if someone were asleep in the next room – he's become a very sly scene-stealer." Sandra Brennan at Rovi noted that: "Whereas many funnymen have been popular for their ability to overreact and mug their way around everyday obstacles, Grodin belonged, from the beginning, to the Bob Newhart school of wry comedy that values understatement and subtlety."

Aside from his film work, Grodin was a frequent presence on television. In 1977, Grodin hosted an episode of the NBC sketch show Saturday Night Live, where the entire episode revolved around his forgetting that the show was live, and Grodin proceeded to wreck sketches because of his failure to prepare accordingly. His many talk show appearances from the 1970s to the early 2020s often included confrontational and mock angry segments. At one time, Johnny Carson "banned" Grodin from The Tonight Show appearances after taking offense at things Grodin had said. The NBC network would receive angry letters from viewers who did not understand the joke that he was playing a persona, trying to be as different from typical talk show guests as possible. Grodin's appearances on Late Night With David Letterman would sometimes erupt into shouting and name-calling, but Letterman always enjoyed Grodin's segments.

=== 1990s ===
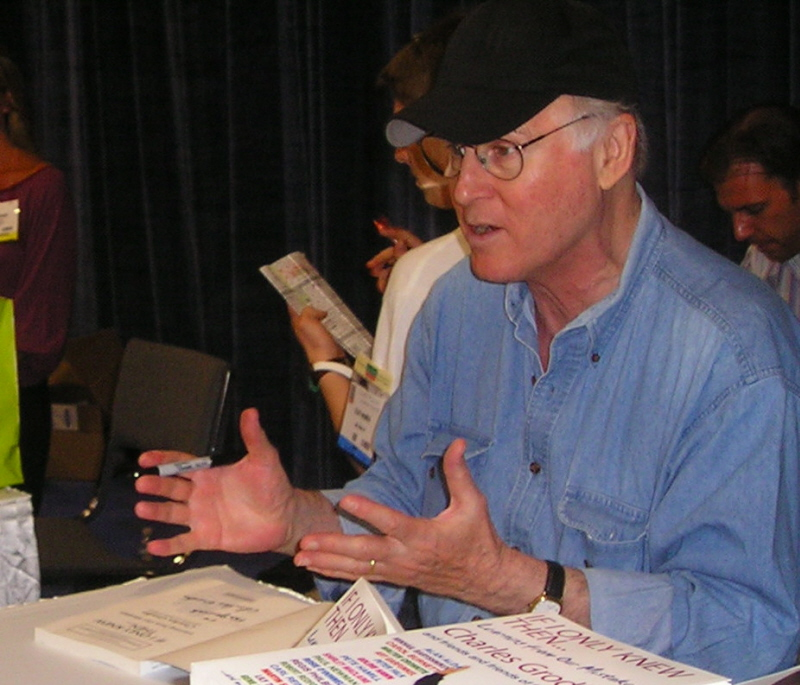
Grodin at BookExpo 2007 at the Javits Center in New York City in 2007

Grodin's career took a turn in 1992, when he played the nervous family man George Newton in the family comedy Beethoven, opposite Bonnie Hunt. The film was a box-office hit, and Grodin reprised the role in the 1993 sequel, Beethoven's 2nd. Also in 1993, Grodin played the role of Harrison Winslow in the film Heart and Souls. After a supporting role in the acclaimed Ivan Reitman comedy Dave, Grodin signed on to play The Old Man in the 1994 limited release sequel to A Christmas Story, It Runs in the Family (a.k.a. My Summer Story). That same year also saw the much-delayed release of Clifford, in which Grodin portrayed the frustrated uncle opposite Martin Short's title role.

From 1995 to 1999, Grodin hosted his own issues-orientated cable news talk show, The Charles Grodin Show. It originated as a nightly show on CNBC, replacing Tom Snyder after he left to start The Late Late Show on CBS. The show was dropped by CNBC in 1998, but aired for a final year as a weekly show on MSNBC before ending its run in late 1999.

=== 2000s ===
From 2000 to 2003, Grodin was a political commentator for 60 Minutes II. In 2004, he wrote The Right Kind of People, an off-Broadway play about co-op boards in certain buildings in Manhattan. Grodin's commentaries were heard on New York City radio station WCBS and other affiliates of the CBS Radio Network, as well as on the CBS Radio Network's Weekend Roundup.

After a 12-year-long hiatus from film, Grodin returned to acting in 2006 in the comedy The Ex starring Zach Braff.

=== 2010s ===
In the 2010s, Grodin made more frequent acting appearances, guest starring on television shows such as Law and Order: Special Victims Unit and The Michael J. Fox Show. He had several supporting roles in films, including Barry Levinson's The Humbling (2014) and Taylor Hackford's The Comedian (2016). Grodin also had a prominent supporting role in Noah Baumbach's While We're Young (2015), playing a celebrated documentary filmmaker and the father of one of the lead characters.

In 2015, Grodin was cast in a recurring role in Louis C.K.'s FX show Louie as Dr. Bigelow, C.K.'s philosophical doctor and mentor in Season 4 and 5. In an interview with Deadline Hollywood, Grodin talked about his relationship with C.K. stating, "I find him to be the single most talented person ... I've ever worked with, he's a wonderful director, writer, and actor." Grodin also portrayed the philanthropist and defrauded investor Carl J. Shapiro in the 2016 miniseries Madoff on ABC based on the Bernie Madoff Ponzi scheme debacle. His final movie was An Imperfect Murder: The Private Life of a Modern Woman, released in 2017.

Grodin was also a prolific author and published his final book in 2013.

== Personal life ==
Grodin was married twice, to Julie Ferguson (divorced) and Elissa Durwood (married 1983). He had two children: daughter Marion (a comedienne), from his marriage to Ferguson, and son, Nicholas, from his marriage to Durwood. For a period in the 2000s, Grodin gave up show business to be a stay-at-home dad to his children.

== Death ==
On May 18, 2021, Grodin died from multiple myeloma at his home in Wilton, Connecticut, at age 86.

== Filmography ==
=== Film ===
Year	Movie	Role	Notes
1954	20,000 Leagues Under the Sea	Drummer Boy	Uncredited
1964	Sex and the College Girl	Bob	
1968	Rosemary's Baby	Dr. C.C. Hill	
1970	Catch-22	Capt. Aarfy Aardvark	
1972	The Heartbreak Kid	Lenny Cantrow	
1974	11 Harrowhouse	Howard R. Chesser	Writer
1976	King Kong	Fred Wilson	
1977	Thieves	Martin Cramer	
1978	Heaven Can Wait	Tony Abbott	
1979	Real Life	Warren Yeager	
1979	Sunburn	Jake Dekker	
1980	It's My Turn	Homer	
1980	Seems Like Old Times	Dist. Atty. Ira J. Parks	
1981	The Incredible Shrinking Woman	Vance Kramer	
1981	The Great Muppet Caper	Nicky Holiday	
1984	The Lonely Guy	Warren Evans	
1984	The Woman in Red	Buddy	
1985	Movers & Shakers	Herb Derman	Writer, producer
1986	Last Resort	George Lollar	
1987	Ishtar	Jim Harrison	
1988	The Couch Trip	George Maitlin	
1988	You Can't Hurry Love	Mr. Glerman	
1988	Midnight Run	Jonathan "the Duke" Mardukas	
1989	Cranium Command	Left Brain	Short
1990	Taking Care of Business	Spencer Barnes	
1992	Beethoven	George Newton	
1993	Dave	Murray Blum	
1993	So I Married an Axe Murderer	Commandeered Driver	
1993	Heart and Souls	Harrison Winslow	
1993	Beethoven's 2nd	George Newton	
1994	Clifford	Martin Daniels	
1994	My Summer Story	Bob Parker (The Old Man)	
2006	The Ex	Bob Kowalski	
2011	The Harmony Game	Self	Documentary
2013	Brazzaville Teen-Ager	Father	Short film
2014	The Humbling	Jerry	
2014	While We're Young	Leslie Breitbart	
2016	The Comedian	Dick D'Angelo	
2017	An Imperfect Murder	Arthur	Final film role, also known as The Private Life of a Modern Woman

=== Television ===
Year	Title	Role	Notes
1958	Decision	Young Hoodlum	Episode: "Man Against Crime"
1958	Armstrong Circle Theatre	Phelps	Episode: "The Nautilus"
1960	Have Gun – Will Travel	Proctor's Henchman	Episode: "Fogg Bound"
1961	The Play of the Week	Performer	Episode: Black Monday
1961	The Defenders	Thomas Martin	Episode: "The Apostle"
1965	The Young Marrieds	Matt Crane Stevens #2	65 episodes
1965	My Mother the Car	Fred	Episode: "Burned at the Steak"
1965	The Trials of O'Brien	Peter Farnum	Episode: "Picture Me a Murder"
1966	The Felony Squad	Edgar	Episode: "Penny Game, a Two-Bit Murder"
1966	Shane	Jed	2 episodes
1967	Iron Horse	Alex	Episode: "The Pembrooke Blood"
1967	The F.B.I.	Carl Platt	Episode: "Sky on Fire"
1967	Captain Nice	News Vendor	Episode: "One Rotten Apple"
1967	The Virginian	Arnie Doud	Episode: "The Reckoning"
1967	The Guns of Will Sonnett	Bells Pickering	Episode: "A Bell for Jeff Sonnett"
1967	N.Y.P.D.	Joey Diamond	Episode: "Money Man"
1968	The Big Valley	Mark Dunigan	Episode: "The Good Thieves"
1969	Judd, for the Defense	Dist. Atty. Tom Durant	Episode: "An Elephant in a Cigar Box"
1969	Simon and Garfunkel: Songs of America	Himself	Director, producer
1974	Paradise	N/A	Co-director, television movie
1977	The Paul Simon Special	Charles	Writer
1977	Saturday Night Live	Himself/host	Episode: Charles Grodin/Paul Simon
1978	Just Me and You	Michael Lindsay	Television movie
1978	The Grass is Always Greener Over the Septic Tank	Jim Benson	Television movie
1981	Laverne & Shirley	Himself	Episode: "Friendly Persuasion"
1983	Charley's Aunt	Lord Fancourt Babberly	Television movie
1986	Fresno	Cane Kensington	Miniseries
1990	The Magical World of Disney	Quentin Fitzwaller	Episode: "The Muppets at Walt Disney World"
1992	Shelley Duvall's Bedtime Stories	Narrator	Episode: "Rotten Island"
1995–1998	The Charles Grodin Show	Host	26 episodes
2000	60 Minutes II	Correspondent	
2012	Law & Order: Special Victims Unit	Brett Forrester	Episode: "Lessons Learned"
2013	The Michael J. Fox Show	Steve Henry	Episode: "Thanksgiving"
2014–15	Louie	Dr. Bigelow	5 episodes
2015	Waiting for Ishtar	Himself	Documentary
2016	Madoff	Carl Shapiro	Miniseries; 4 episodes
2016	The New Yorker Presents	Psychiatrist	Episode: 1.8; Final television role

=== Theatre ===
Year	Title	Role	Notes
1962	Tchin-Tchin	Performer – Robert Prickett	Plymouth Theatre, Broadway
1964	Absence of a Cello	Performer – Perry Littlewood	Ambassador Theatre, Broadway
1968	Lovers and Other Strangers	Director	Brooks Atkinson Theatre, Broadway
1974	Thieves	Director/producer	Broadhurst Theatre and Longacre Theatre, Broadway
1975	Same Time, Next Year	Performer – George Peters	Brooks Atkinson Theatre, Broadway
1977	Unexpected Guests	Director	Little Theatre, Broadway

== Awards and nominations ==
Year	Award	Category	Work	Result	Ref.
1972	Golden Globe Awards	Best Actor in a Motion Picture – Musical or Comedy	The Heartbreak Kid	Nominated	
1978	Primetime Emmy Awards	Outstanding Writing for a Variety Special	The Paul Simon Special	Won	
1980	Golden Raspberry Awards	Worst Supporting Actor	Seems Like Old Times	Nominated	
1988	Valladolid International Film Festival	Best Actor	Midnight Run	Won	
1993	Saturn Awards	Best Supporting Actor	Heart and Souls	Nominated	
1994	American Comedy Awards	Funniest Supporting Actor in a Motion Picture	Dave	Won	
2006	William Kunstler Awards	Racial Justice		Won	

== Bibliography ==
Plays

- Grodin, Charles. Price of Fame: A Play. New York: Samuel French, 1991. ISBN 978-0-573-69220-8.
- Grodin, Charles. One of the All-Time Greats: A Comedy. New York: S. French, 1992. ISBN 978-0-573-69366-3.
- Grodin, Charles. The Right Kind of People. New York: Samuel French, 2008. ISBN 978-0-573-65107-6.

Books

- Grodin, Charles. It Would Be So Nice If You Weren't Here: My Journey Through Show Business. New York: Morrow, 1989. ISBN 978-0-679-73134-4.
- Grodin, Charles. How I Get Through Life: A Wise and Witty Guide. New York: Morrow, 1992. ISBN 978-0-688-11258-5.
- Grodin, Charles. Freddie the Fly. New York : Random House, 1993. ISBN 978-0-679-83847-0.
- Grodin, Charles. We're Ready for You, Mr. Grodin: Behind the Scenes at Talk Shows, Movies, and Elsewhere. New York: Charles Scribner's Sons, 1994. ISBN 978-0-025-45795-9.
- Grodin, Charles. I Like It Better When You're Funny: Working in Television and Other Precarious Adventures. New York: Random House, 2002. ISBN 978-0-375-50784-7.
- Grodin, Charles. If I Only Knew Then... Learning from Our Mistakes. New York: Springboard Press, 2007. ISBN 978-0-446-58115-8.
- Grodin, Charles. How I Got to Be Whoever It Is I Am. New York: Springboard Press, 2009. ISBN 978-0-446-51940-3.
- Grodin, Charles. Just When I Thought I'd Heard Everything: Humorous Observations on Life in America. Santa Monica, Calif: Homina Publishing, 2013. ISBN 978-0-970-44999-3.

== In popular culture ==
Grodin is mentioned as a hero of characters Mac and Dennis in the season six episode of It's Always Sunny in Philadelphia entitled "Mac's Mom Burns Her House Down".

He was referenced in three different episodes of The Simpsons ("I'm Spelling as Fast as I Can", "Little Big Girl" and "Mathlete's Feat").

In the Seinfeld episode "The Doll" Jerry Seinfeld buys a bottle of sauce because the brand's mascot bears a resemblance to Grodin.
