= A Thousand Clowns =

1965 film adaptation from a 1962 play by Herb Gardner

- Theatrical release poster
- Directed by: Fred Coe
- Screenplay by: Herb Gardner
- Based on: A Thousand Clowns by Herb Gardner
- Produced by: Fred Coe; Herb Gardner (associate producer); Ralph Rosenblum (associate producer)
- Starring: Jason Robards; Barbara Harris; Martin Balsam; Barry Gordon
- Cinematography: Arthur J. Ornitz
- Edited by: Ralph Rosenblum
- Music by: Gerry Mulligan; Don Walker
- Distributed by: United Artists
- Release date: December 13, 1965
- Running time: 116 minutes
- Country: United States
- Language: English
- Budget: $1 million
- Box office: $2.4 million (Rentals)

A Thousand Clowns is a 1965 American comedy-drama film directed by Fred Coe and starring Jason Robards, Barbara Harris, Martin Balsam, and Barry Gordon. The script was adapted by Herb Gardner from his 1962 play of the same name. The film tells the story of an eccentric comedy writer who is forced to conform to society to retain legal custody of his nephew.

Jason Robards, Barry Gordon, William Daniels, and Gene Saks all reprised their roles from the original 1962 Broadway production. Balsam won the Academy Award for Best Supporting Actor for his performance in the film.

== Plot ==
Unemployed television writer Murray Burns (Jason Robards) lives in a cluttered New York City studio apartment with his 12-year-old nephew, Nick (Barry Gordon). Murray has been unemployed for five months after quitting his previous job writing jokes for a children's television show called Chuckles the Chipmunk. Nick, the son of Murray's unwed sister, was left with Murray seven years earlier.

When Nick writes a school essay on the benefits of unemployment insurance, his school requests that New York State send social workers to investigate his living conditions. Investigators for the Child Welfare Board Sandra Markowitz (Barbara Harris) and her superior and boyfriend, Albert Amundson (William Daniels), threaten Murray with removal of the child from his custody unless he can prove he is a capable guardian.

Charmed by Nick and Murray, Sandra argues with Albert, who goes off without her to their next case. Sandra spends the night with Murray. She urges Murray to find a job so that he can keep his nephew, and Murray agrees to look. But he walks out of his job interviews, treating them as a joke, because he feels that work would make him conventional and conformist and make every day the same. He apologizes to Sandra, but she is so disappointed in him that she walks out. Yet he knows that if he wishes to keep his nephew, he must swallow his pride and go back to work.

Murray also feels that he cannot let go of Nick until the boy shows some "backbone." In a confrontation with his brother and agent Arnold (Martin Balsam), Murray expounds his nonconformist worldview: that a person must fight at all costs to retain a sense of identity and aliveness and avoid being absorbed by the homogeneous masses. Arnold retorts that by conforming to the dictates of society, he has become "the best possible Arnold Burns."

Murray agrees to meet with his former employer, the detested Chuckles host Leo Herman (Gene Saks). When Nick does not laugh at Leo's pathetic display of comedy, Leo insults Nick, who quietly but firmly puts Leo in his place. Nick becomes upset with Murray for tolerating Leo's insults, and Murray sees the boy has finally grown a backbone. Realizing that Nick has come of age, Murray resigns himself to going back to his old job, Sandra returns, and the next morning Murray joins the crowds of people heading off to work.

== Cast ==
- Jason Robards as Murray Burns
- Barbara Harris as Dr. Sandra Markowitz
- Martin Balsam as Arnold Burns
- Barry Gordon as Nick Burns
- William Daniels as Albert Amundson
- Gene Saks as Leo "Chuckles the Chipmunk" Herman
- Phil Bruns as Sloan
- John McMartin (as "John Macmartin") as Man in office

== Awards and nominations ==
Award	Category	Nominee(s)	Result	Ref.
Academy Awards	Best Picture	Fred Coe	Nominated	
Academy Awards	Best Supporting Actor	Martin Balsam	Won	
Academy Awards	Best Screenplay – Based on Material from Another Medium	Herb Gardner	Nominated	
Academy Awards	Best Scoring of Music – Adaptation or Treatment	Don Walker	Nominated	
American Cinema Editors Awards	Best Edited Feature Film	Ralph Rosenblum	Nominated	
Golden Globe Awards	Best Motion Picture – Musical or Comedy		Nominated	
Golden Globe Awards	Best Actor in a Motion Picture – Musical or Comedy	Jason Robards	Nominated	
Golden Globe Awards	Best Actress in a Motion Picture – Musical or Comedy	Barbara Harris	Nominated	
Laurel Awards	Top Male Supporting Performance	Martin Balsam	Won	
National Board of Review Awards	Top Ten Films		8th Place	
Writers Guild of America Awards	Best Written American Comedy	Herb Gardner	Won	

== Music ==
Music in the film ranges from rudimentary drum cadences to Dixieland arrangements of "The Stars and Stripes Forever". The song "Yes Sir, That's My Baby" is used in several places.

Judy Holliday wrote the lyrics for the theme song "A Thousand Clowns". This was her last film credit, as the film was released after her death on June 7, 1965.

== See also ==
- List of American films of 1965
