= Donald Moffat =

British–American actor (1930–2018)

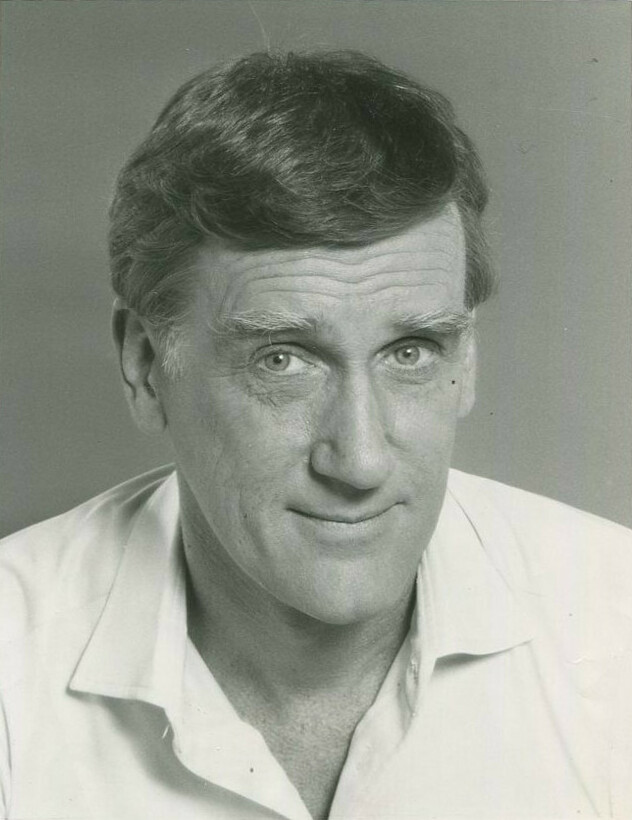
- Moffat in 1977
- Born: December 26, 1930; Plymouth, Devon, England
- Died: December 20, 2018 (aged 87); Sleepy Hollow, New York, U.S.
- Education: Royal Academy of Dramatic Art (BA)
- Occupation: Actor
- Years active: 1956–2005
- Spouses: Anne Murray Ellsperman (m. 1954; div. 1968); Gwen Arner (m. 1970)
- Children: 4

Donald Moffat (December 26, 1930 – December 20, 2018) was a British-American actor with a decades-long career in film and stage in the United States.

Moffat began his acting career on- and off-Broadway, which included appearances in The Wild Duck and Right You Are If You Think You Are, earning Tony Award nominations for both, as well as Painting Churches, for which he received an Obie Award. Moffat also appeared in several feature films, including The Thing (1982), The Right Stuff (1983), and in a rare leading role on film, as a tenuously recovering alcoholic in On the Nickel (1980). Moffat also made guest appearances in numerous television series, including such shows as Little House on the Prairie, Dr. Quinn, Medicine Woman, and The West Wing. He also was a principal in the 1993 TV miniseries Tales of the City.

== Early life ==
Moffat was born on December 26, 1930, in Plymouth, Devon, the only child of Kathleen Mary (née Smith) and Walter George Moffat, an insurance agent. His father was Scottish. His parents ran a boarding house in Totnes. After completing his studies at the local King Edward VI School and a period of national service in the Army from 1949 to 1951, Moffat trained at the Royal Academy of Dramatic Art in London.

== Career ==
=== Stage ===
Moffat began his career as a stage actor in London and New York City. His first work was at the Old Vic Theatre Company in London.

After moving to the United States, Moffat worked as a bartender and a lumberjack in Oregon, his wife's home state. "After six months," he said, "I realized that I was an actor and I would always be an actor. And an actor must act. So I started acting again." His first acting job in the United States was in Princeton, New Jersey. He worked as a carpenter, and his wife did ironing to supplement his $25-per-week pay.

He joined the Association of Producing Artists, a repertory company on Broadway, and was nominated for a Tony for Best Actor in a Play in 1967 for his roles in revivals of Henrik Ibsen's The Wild Duck and Pirandello's Right You Are If You Think You Are.

He was nominated for Drama Desk Awards for Outstanding Actor in a Play for his work in Play Memory (1984) and for Outstanding Featured Actor in the revival of Eugene O'Neill's The Iceman Cometh (1986) with Jason Robards. He won an Obie for Painting Churches. In 1998, he was nominated for a Gemini Award for his performance as attorney Joe Ruah in the CBC miniseries The Sleep Room. He also appeared in many Broadway and Off-Broadway plays, including John Guare's A Few Stout Individuals (as Ulysses S. Grant), The Heiress, The Cherry Orchard, Much Ado About Nothing, The School for Scandal, The Affair and Hamlet.

=== Film ===
Among Moffat's best-known film roles are as Lyndon B. Johnson in The Right Stuff (1983), the U.S. president in Clear and Present Danger, and as Garry, the station commander in The Thing.

=== Television ===
Moffat played Enos in the CBS Western miniseries The Chisholms, Lars Lundstrom in the ABC drama The New Land, and Rem in the CBS science-fiction series Logan's Run. He also appeared in Columbo, The West Wing, Dr. Quinn, Medicine Woman, and Tales of the City, in which his performance as dying executive Edgar Halcyon earned him many new fans. One of his final roles was as Baseball Commissioner Ford Frick in the HBO movie, 61*. Moffat's last role was as a judge in an episode of Law & Order: Trial by Jury in 2005.

== Personal life ==
Moffat married actress Anne Murray in 1954; they had a daughter, Wendy, and a son, Gabriel, before divorcing in 1968. He later married actress Gwen Arner.

Moffat died on December 20, 2018, in Sleepy Hollow, New York, due to complications from a stroke, at the age of 87.

== Selected TV and filmography ==
- The Battle of the River Plate (U.S. title Pursuit of the Graf Spee) (1956) as Swanston, Lookout, HMS Ajax (uncredited)
- Rachel, Rachel (1968) as Niall Cameron
- R. P. M. (1970) as Perry Howard
- The High Chaparral (1970) as Henry Simmons
- Hawaii Five-O (1970) as Dr. David Forbes
- Mission: Impossible (1971) as Alex Pierson
- Night Gallery (1971) "Pickman's Model" as Uncle George
- The Great Northfield Minnesota Raid (1972) as Manning
- Showdown (1973) as Art Williams
- Gunsmoke (1974) "The Foundling" (S19E18) as Joseph Graham
- The New Land (1974) as Reverend Lundstrom
- The Terminal Man (1974) as Dr. Arthur McPherson
- Earthquake (1974) as Dr. Harvey Johnson
- The Call of the Wild (1976) as Simpson
- Ebony, Ivory & Jade (1976) as Ian Cabot
- The Waltons (1977) as Mr. Morgan
- Family (1977) as Philip Raskin
- Exo-Man (1977) as Wallace Rogers
- Logan's Run (1977–1978) as Rem
- Little House on the Prairie (1978) as Mr Mears (2 episodes)
- Eleanor and Franklin: The White House Years (1977) as Harry Hopkins
- Land of No Return (1978) as Air Traffic Controller
- The Word (1978) as Henri Aubert
- Promises in the Dark (1979) as Dr. Walter McInerny
- On the Nickel (1980) as Sam
- Popeye (1980) as the Taxman
- The Chisholms CBS miniseries (1980) as Enos
- The Thing (1982) as M.T. Garry
- The Right Stuff (1983) as U.S. Vice President Lyndon B. Johnson
- License to Kill (1984) as Webster
- Alamo Bay (1985) as Wally
- The Best of Times (1986) as the Colonel
- Monster in the Closet (1986) as General Franklin D. Turnbull
- The Bourne Identity (1988) as David Abbott; in the 2002 film version the role is re-imagined as Deputy Director Ward Abbott (played by Brian Cox)
- The Unbearable Lightness of Being (1988) as Chief Surgeon
- Far North (1988) as Uncle Dane
- L.A. Law (1989) as Judge Lawrence O'Neil
- Music Box (1989) as Harry Talbot'
- The Bonfire of the Vanities (1990) as Mr. McCoy
- Class Action (1991) as Quinn
- Regarding Henry (1991) as Charlie Cameron
- Babe Ruth (1991) as Jacob Ruppert
- Housesitter (1992) as George Davis
- Love, Cheat & Steal (1993) as Frank Harrington
- Clear and Present Danger (1994) as the fictional President Bennett
- Trapped in Paradise (1994) as Clifford Anderson
- The Evening Star (1996) as Hector Scott
- The Sleep Room (1998) as Joe Ruah
- Cookie's Fortune (1999) as Jack Palmer
- 61* (2001) as Ford Frick
- The West Wing (2003) as Talmidge "Tal" Cregg (C.J.'s Father)
- Law & Order: Trial by Jury (2005) as a Judge (final appearance)

== Bibliography ==
- Terrace, Vincent (January 10, 2014). Encyclopedia of television shows, 1925 through 2010 (2nd ed.). Jefferson, N.C.: McFarland. ISBN 978-0-7864-6477-7.
