= Fresno (miniseries) =

- Written by: Mark Ganzel; Barry Kemp; Michael Petryni
- Directed by: Jeff Bleckner
- Starring: Carol Burnett; Dabney Coleman; Teri Garr; Charles Grodin; Gregory Harrison; Valerie Mahaffey
- Theme music composer: John Morris
- Country of origin: United States
- Original language: English
- No. of episodes: 5

Production
- Producer: R. W. Goodwin
- Cinematography: Robert Steadman
- Editor: Andrew Chulack
- Running time: 360 minutes
- Production company: MTM Enterprises
- Budget: US$12 million

Original release
- Network: CBS
- Release: November 16 – November 20, 1986

Fresno is a 1986 American television comedy miniseries that parodied prime time soap operas of the time such as Falcon Crest, Dallas, and Dynasty. Fresno was directed by Jeff Bleckner. The series featured high production values, including lavish haute couture gowns by leading costume designer Bob Mackie, a main cast including Carol Burnett, Teri Garr, Charles Grodin and Dabney Coleman, and supporting cast including Charles Keating, Pat Corley, Louise Latham, Tom Poston and Henry Darrow. It was noted at the time as being the first American satirical TV comedy to be made in the then-popular miniseries format.

== Plot ==
In 1581 conquistadors exploring California name a valley "Fresno" after the bitter taste of its grapes. In present-day Fresno, the raisin-growing empire of the once-wealthy Kensington family are locked in a struggle with their former business partner Tyler Cane. The Kensingtons are pinning their hopes on a new grape variety they have developed. Foreman Juan is charged with getting the prototype raisins to the patent office in Sacramento, but on the way is ambushed by Cane's men, who destroy the shipment. Juan is saved by a stranger, Torch. He accompanies Juan back to the ranch, and is hired as a ranch-hand. As Charlotte shows Torch around the ranch, she explains how, 20 years earlier, her late husband Yancey fell out with Cane, and then died in a "bizarre dehydrator accident". Torch begins to investigate the Kensingtons' affairs, awakening suspicions in Charlotte about Yancey's death, and her interest in finding her real parents.

Attempting to save the business, Cane Kensington strikes a deal with Mr. Acme, owner of Acme Toxic Waste. He pays Cane to allow him to dump toxic waste into Duke Lake, a private dam owned by Cane's neighbor Ethel Duke, and main water source for both the ranches. Suspecting that their meeting may have been overheard by the maid, Bobbi Jo Bobb, Cane decides to send her to Bakersfield. However, Cane's patronage upsets Bobbi Jo's husband Billy Joe, leading to tragic consequences.

Duke's water rights are crucial to Cane and the Kensingtons. Cane visits Duke, offering to buy the water rights, but she refuses. Later that day, in Fresno, Charlotte is outmaneuvered by Cane, who takes control of the annual Raisin Festival and vows to erase the Kensington name from Fresno forever. That night, Billy Joe listens to Bobbi Jo on the radio, and becomes enraged when she makes a dedication to Cane. He shoots the radio, but the bullet ricochets off it, killing Ethel Duke. Billy Joe is arrested and charged with murder. Public defender Desiree DeMornay is assigned the case.

Nature-loving Kevin finds dead fish floating in Duke Lake, and soon discovers a leaking Acme Toxic Waste drum at the bottom of the river. Kevin confronts Mr. Acme, who orders his henchmen to kill Kevin, but they blow up Acme's truck by mistake. Juan confronts Charlotte and demands a raise at gunpoint, but instead Charlotte cuts his wages in half. Cane makes an anonymous phone call to the police, implicating Kevin in the death of Duke, and Kevin is also arrested and charged with murder.

Duke's death triggers a struggle between Cane and the Kensingtons to buy the water rights from Duke's husband, Earl. Tyler bribes Earl, but Cane learns of Tyler's bid, and outbids him. That night, Charlotte goes to Earl's to seduce him, but her plan is ruined when she discovers that Tyler has sent Candy Cane, who emerges from Earl's bathroom clad only in a towel.

Charlotte visits Kevin in jail, where she learns his bail has been set at $250,000. Cane blackmails Mr. Acme into paying him an additional $300,000, so he can buy the water rights. He rushes to the bank to clear the check, but Charlotte arrives just after he leaves, and withdraws most of the money. Tiffany meets Torch at a Fresno restaurant and asks for his help in finding her real parents. Back at the jail, Kevin and Billy Joe deduce that Cane is behind the entire conspiracy. Bobbi Jo arrives, but when she learns of Talon's attempt to seduce her husband, she suspects the worst and rejects him.

Rushing back to Earl's, Cane tries to stop Tyler from buying the water rights, but when Earl phones the bank to verify Cane's check, he learns it is worthless because Charlotte withdrew money to pay Kevin's bail. Ethel's attorney arrives: he explains that Earl cannot sell the water rights because Earl will not inherit Ethel's estate until the reading of the will at 2 p.m. tomorrow.

== Cast ==
Starring

- Carol Burnett as Charlotte Kensington
- Dabney Coleman as Tyler Cane
- Gregory Harrison as Torch
- Teri Garr as Talon Kensington
- Charles Grodin as Cane Kensington

Also starring

- Luis Avalos as Juan
- Pat Corley as Earl Duke
- Valerie Mahaffey as Tiffany Kensington
- Anthony Heald as Kevin Kensington
- Teresa Ganzel as Bobbi Jo Bobb
- Bill Paxton as Billy Joe Bobb
- Jerry Van Dyke as Tucker Agajanian
- Charles Keating as Charles
- Melanie Chartoff as Desiree DeMornay
- Michael Richards & J. E. Freeman as Henchmen

Special guest appearance by

- Jeffrey Jones as Mr. Acme

Guest starring

- Louise Latham as Ethel Duke
- Henry Darrow as Commandant
- Tammy Lauren as Candy Cane
- Natalie Gregory as China Kensington
- Tom Poston as Doc Parseghian
- George D. Wallace as Judge Henry Bejajian
- Dakin Matthews as Prosecutor
- Raye Birk as Mr. Loats
- Thomas Hill as Mr. Crowther
- Jack Kehler as Sgt. Cooper
- Todd Susman as Sgt. Dobbs

== Production ==
Fresno was created and co-written by Barry Kemp, Mark Ganzel, and Michael Petryni, and was produced for CBS by Mary Tyler-Moore's MTM Productions. The miniseries was directed by Jeff Bleckner, who had previously directed episodes of some of the shows parodied in Fresno, including Dynasty, Knots Landing, and Falcon Crest.

The miniseries starred Carol Burnett and Dabney Coleman, with Charles Grodin, Teri Garr, Valerie Mahaffey, Bill Paxton, Anthony Heald, Gregory Harrison, Luis Avalos, Jerry Van Dyke, Charles Keating, Pat Corley, and Jeffrey Jones.

The production shot for two days in the city of Fresno, California, in July 1986, completing its remaining 53 days in Los Angeles. The music was composed by John Morris, and the Emmy-nominated gowns worn by the female leads were designed by Bob Mackie. It was executive produced by Barry Kemp.

Fresno was screened three times in the United States in 1986, 1987 and 1989. It premiered at 8 pm on Sunday, November 16, 1986 with a two-hour series opener, followed by four further one-hour episodes over the next four days.

== Episodes ==
No.	Title	Directed by	Written by	Original release date	US viewers (millions)
1	"The Raisin Basket of the World"	Jeff Bleckner	Mark Ganzel, Barry Kemp & Michael Petryni	November 16, 1986	19.7
Raisin Baron Tyler Cane seeks to cut off the Kensington Ranch water supply so he can control the raisin crop of Fresno, but Cane Kensington will fight him for every last drop.
2	"Episode 2"	Jeff Bleckner	Mark Ganzel, Barry Kemp & Michael Petryni	November 17, 1986	15.2
The Kensingtons need the Duke tract of land for access to the water they need, and Charlotte uses her female wiles to get it. Charles frames his brother Kevin to cover up his own foul deed.
3	"Episode 3"	Jeff Bleckner	Mark Ganzel, Barry Kemp & Michael Petryni	November 18, 1986	12.8
Tiffany finds a kindred spirit in Torch, a drifter without a shirt, and their search reveals the identity of her true parents. Tyler uses Juan as a spy to get the goods on Cane.
4	"Episode 4"	Jeff Bleckner	Mark Ganzel, Barry Kemp & Michael Petryni	November 19, 1986	12.5
Skeletons come out of the closet at the Annual Raisin Festival Masquerade Ball, and an attempt to kill Cane goes wrong.
5	"Episode 5"	Jeff Bleckner	Mark Ganzel, Barry Kemp & Michael Petryni	November 20, 1986	12.7
The identities of two killers are revealed amid courtroom pandemonium. Cane has to be in two court rooms at the same time and tell two different stories.

== Awards and nominations ==
- 1987 Casting Society of America Artio Award for Best Casting for TV Miniseries
- 1987 Emmy Award for Outstanding Achievement in Hairstyling for a Miniseries or a Special
- 1987 Emmy Award for Outstanding Art Direction for a Miniseries or a Special
- 1987 Emmy Award for Outstanding Costume Design for a Miniseries or a Special
- 1987 Emmy Award for Outstanding Editing for a Miniseries or a Special
- 1987 Emmy Award for Outstanding Sound Editing for a Miniseries or a Special
