= Ann Wedgeworth =

American actress (1934–2017)

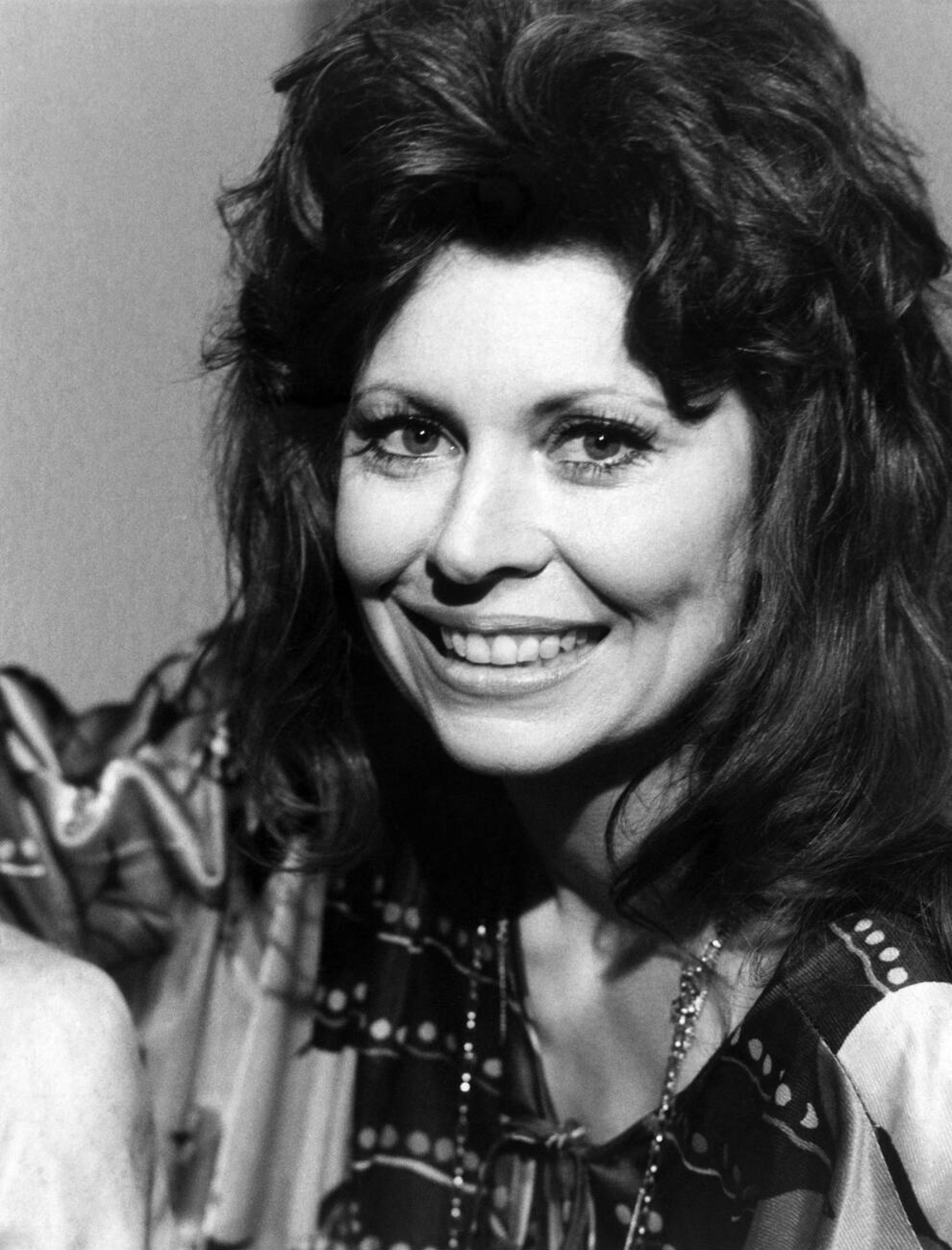
- Wedgeworth in Somerset (1973)
- Born: Elizabeth Ann Wedgeworth; January 21, 1934; Abilene, Texas, U.S.
- Died: November 16, 2017 (aged 83); North Bergen, New Jersey, U.S.
- Education: Highland Park High School
- Alma mater: University of Texas
- Occupation: Actress
- Years active: 1957–2006
- Known for: Three's Company; Chapter Two; Evening Shade
- Spouses: Rip Torn (m. 1955; div. 1961); Ernest Martin (m. 1970)
- Children: 2

Elizabeth Ann Wedgeworth (January 21, 1934 – November 16, 2017) was an American character actress, known for her roles as Lana Shields in Three's Company, Hilda Hensley in Sweet Dreams, and Merleen Elldridge in Evening Shade. She won the Tony Award for Best Performance by a Featured Actress in a Play for Chapter Two (1978).

== Early life ==
Elizabeth Ann Wedgeworth was born in Abilene, Texas. She graduated from Highland Park High School in University Park, Texas, where she was a childhood friend and high school classmate of Jayne Mansfield. She dropped her first name after graduating from the University of Texas in 1957, and moved to New York City. After auditioning several times, she was admitted to The Actors Studio.

== Career ==
=== Theatre ===
Wedgeworth made her Broadway debut in the play Make a Million in 1958. She later had many roles on Broadway and off-Broadway productions, including Period of Adjustment, Blues for Mister Charlie, The Last Analysis, and Thieves. In 1978, she won the Tony Award for Best Performance by a Featured Actress in a Play for Chapter Two.

Wedgeworth appeared off-Broadway at New York's Promenade Theatre from December 5, 1985, until June 1, 1986, in Sam Shepard's A Lie of the Mind, co-starring Harvey Keitel and Geraldine Page; coincidentally, Page, a decade Wedgeworth's senior, had married actor Rip Torn after his divorce from Wedgeworth. At the time, Page and Torn were married, but were estranged at the time of Page's death in 1987. For her performance in A Lie of the Mind, Wedgeworth was nominated for a Drama Desk Award for Outstanding Featured Actress in a Play.

=== Film ===
Wedgeworth had supporting roles in many movies. She had the female leading role opposite Gene Hackman in the 1973 film Scarecrow. She later co-starred in Bang the Drum Slowly (1973), Law and Disorder (1974), One Summer Love (1976), and Thieves (1977). In 1977, she won the National Society of Film Critics Award for Best Supporting Actress for her performance in Handle with Care.

Through the 1980s, Wedgeworth had many supporting roles, often playing mothers, such as in No Small Affair as Jon Cryer's character's, in Sweet Dreams as Patsy Cline's mother, followed by 1987's Made in Heaven as one unknowingly reunited with her dead son. In 1989, she portrayed Aunt Fern in Steel Magnolias. She appeared as Sissy Spacek's character's mother in the 1991 film Hard Promises. She also appeared in two films opposite Renée Zellweger: Love and a .45 and The Whole Wide World. Wedgeworth had her final film role in The Hawk Is Dying, with Paul Giamatti, which opened at the Sundance Film Festival in 2006.

=== Television ===
In early years, Wedgeworth had main roles on numerous daytime soap operas. She played the roles of Angela Talbot on The Edge of Night from 1966 to 1967, and later joined the cast of Another World as Lahoma Vane Lucas. She played the role from 1967 to 1970, and from 1970 to 1973 appeared on its spinoff, Somerset.

In 1979, Wedgeworth was cast as divorcée Lana Shields on the hit ABC sitcom Three's Company. Producers introduced her character to fill the void left by Audra Lindley, who had left to star in the show's spin-off, The Ropers. According to behind-the-scenes reports, the addition of Lana to the cast caused tension between series star John Ritter and the show's writers. Ritter believed it would be out of character for his character, the womanizing Jack Tripper, to inexplicably turn down the advances of Lana, a sexually voracious, attractive older woman. The writers reasoned that because Lana was older than Jack, he would be turned off. Ritter did not believe that the middle-aged Lana, only meant to be in her 40s (whereas Jack was in his late 20s/early 30s), would repel Jack. Wedgeworth claimed that she asked to be released from her contract because of Lana's dwindling role in the show. Wedgeworth appeared in just nine episodes of the series before her character was written out without any explanation and never referred to again.

In 1982, Wedgeworth worked with Linda Bloodworth-Thomason in her first comedy series, Filthy Rich, playing ditsy, good-natured Bootsie Westchester. The series was canceled after two seasons in 1983. In 1989, she guest-starred as Audrey Conner, the emotionally fragile mother of Dan Conner (played by John Goodman) on the ABC sitcom, Roseanne. Her longest role was on the CBS sitcom Evening Shade as Merleen Eldridge. The series aired from 1990 to 1994. In 1994, Wedgeworth starred in the unsuccessful Evening Shade spin-off, Harlan & Merleen.

== Personal life ==
Wedgeworth married Rip Torn in 1955. They had a daughter, actress Danae Torn. The couple divorced in 1961. In 1970, she married acting teacher and director Ernie Martin, and, in 1972, had a daughter, actress/acting teacher/writer Diánna Martin.

== Death ==
In 2017, Wedgeworth died after a long illness, at a nursing home in North Bergen, New Jersey, aged 83.

== Filmography ==
=== Film ===
Year	Title	Role	Notes
1965	Andy	Margie	
1973	Scarecrow	Frenchy	
1973	Bang the Drum Slowly	Katie	
1974	Law and Disorder	Sally	
1974	The Catamount Killing	Kit Loring	
1976	One Summer Love	Pearlie	
1976	Birch Interval	Marie	
1977	Thieves	Nancy	
1977	Handle with Care	Dallas Angel	National Society of Film Critics Award for Best Supporting Actress
1977	The War Between the Tates	Danielle Zimmerman	TV movie
1980	Bogie	Mayo Methot	TV movie
1981	Elvis and the Beauty Queen	Aunt Betty	TV movie
1981	Soggy Bottom, U.S.A.	Dusty Wheeler	
1981	Killjoy	Rosie	TV movie
1984	No Small Affair	Joan Cummings	
1985	Right to Kill?	Eve Whitcomb	TV movie
1985	My Science Project	Dolores	
1985	Sweet Dreams	Hilda Hensley	Nominated—National Society of Film Critics Award for Best Supporting Actress
1986	The Men's Club	Jo	
1987	A Stranger Waits	Susan Berger	TV movie
1987	A Tiger's Tale	Claudine	
1987	Made in Heaven	Annette Shea	
1988	Far North	Amy	
1989	Miss Firecracker	Miss Blue	
1989	Steel Magnolias	Aunt Fern	
1990	Green Card	Party Guest #1	
1991	Hard Promises	Chris's Mom	
1993	Cooperstown	Lila Kunznick	TV movie
1994	Love and a .45	Thaylene Cheatham	
1994	A Burning Passion: The Margaret Mitchell Story	Mrs. O'Flaherty	TV movie
1995	Fight for Justice: The Nancy Conn Story	Mary Howell	TV movie
1996	The Whole Wide World	Mrs. Howard	
1999	The Hunter's Moon	Borlene	
2006	The Hawk Is Dying	Ma Gattling	(final film role)

=== Television ===
Year	Title	Role	Notes
1957	Kraft Theatre	Ruth Cashel	Episode: "Vengeance"
1964	The Defenders	Sally Bernard	Episode: "Hero of the People"
1966–1967	The Edge of Night	Angela 'Angie' Talbot	Unknown episodes
1966	Hawk	Helen Rainey	Episode: "Death Comes Full Circle"
1967–1970	Another World	Lahoma Vane Lucas	Unknown episodes
1970	Somerset	Lahoma Vane Lucas	Episode: "#1.1"
1975	Bronk	Kate	Episode: "The Gauntlet"
1979	Three's Company	Lana Shields	9 episodes
1980	When the Whistle Blows	Sheila Norris	Episode: "Wildcatters"
1982–1983	Filthy Rich	Bootsie Westchester	15 episodes
1985	One Life to Live	Charlie Barnes	Unknown episodes
1986	The Twilight Zone	Clerk	Episode: "The After Hours"
1987	The Equalizer	Irene Baylor	Episode: "Suspicion of Innocence"
1989	Roseanne	Audrey Conner	Episode: "We Gather Together"
1990–1994	Evening Shade	Merleen Elldridge	98 episodes Nominated—Viewers for Quality Television Award for Best Specialty Player

=== Stage ===
Year	Title	Role	Notes
1958	The Crucible	Abigail Williams	Martinique Theatre
1958	Make A Million	Julie Martin	Playhouse Theatre, Broadway
1960	Period of Adjustment	Isabel Haverstick	Hayes Theater, Broadway
1964	Blues For Mister Charlie	Jo Britten	Anta Theatre, Broadway
1964	The Last Analysis	Pamela	Belasco Theatre, Broadway
1974	Thieves	Nancy	Broadhurst Theatre, Broadway
1977	Chapter Two	Faye Medwick	Imperial Theatre, Broadway
1985	A Lie of the Mind	Meg	Promenade Theater, Off-Broadway
