= On the Nickel =

1980 film by Ralph Waite

On the Nickel (film)
- Directed by: Ralph Waite
- Starring: Donald Moffat; Ralph Waite; Penelope Allen; Hal Williams; Jack Kehoe
- Edited by: Wendy Greene Bricmont
- Music by: Fred Myrow
- Release date: 1980
- Running time: 96 min.
- Country: United States
- Language: English

On the Nickel is a 1980 feature film written, produced by, and starring Ralph Waite, as well as Donald Moffat. It features five original songs composed for the movie by Tom Waits.

The film presents the story of Sam (Donald Moffat), a recovering alcoholic, who feels dissatisfied with his life of sobriety and goes back in search of the good times he enjoyed with his old friends living on Los Angeles' skid row. (This includes a section of Fifth Street, which is sometimes called "the Nickel", after the five-cent coin.) Eventually finding his best friend, "C.G." (Waite), still living on the Nickel, the two men reminisce, and Sam gets a fresh look at the lifestyle he had once vigorously abandoned. The film is a multi-level odyssey through the slums of LA, as well as Sam's personal ruminations as he re-evaluates the nostalgia he had felt for the free and bohemian lifestyle of a street person.

The film also stars Hal Williams, Penelope Allen, and Jack Kehoe. The original soundtrack was written and performed by Tom Waits. With its offbeat, comedic depiction of life on the streets, the film has maintained a cult following since its initial release, although it passed out of general availability for 20 years and effectively became a "lost" movie. Despite this, occasional showings on American television have kept viewer interest high and have resulted in Mr. Waite's decision to collaborate with producer Thomas Wise, to re-edit and restore the feature for DVD and internet release in late 2009. On the Nickel debuted on Blu Ray disc in 2017. Discs are currently mastered in Germany and imported to the U.S. and North America. They are compatible with players in the U.S., Central and South America, Canada, and most of Asia.

== Cast ==
- Donald Moffat as Sam
- Ralph Waite as C.G.
- Hal Williams as Paul
- Penelope Allen as Rose
- Jack Kehoe as "Bad Mood"
- Daniel Ades as "God Bless"
- Paul Weaver as Hill
- Ina Gould as Estelle
- Jack O'Leary as William "Big William"
- James Gammon as John "Peanut John"
- Arthur Space as "Soapy" Post
- Bert Conway as Bert
- Jaime Sanchez as Joe
- Tom Mahoney as Bobby "Bobby D"
- Edmund E. Villa as Henry
- Lane Smith as Preacher
- Ellen Geer as Louise
- Gayle Vance as Beatrice
- Nathan Adler as Moses
- Pat Corley as Judge
- Arnold Johnson as Camel
- George Loros as Prophet
- Mike Robelo as "1,000 Miles Shorty"
- John P. Ryan as Doctor
- Patrick Tovatt as Father Don
