= Jon Krampner =

Jon Krampner (born in 1952 in New York City) is an American journalist and author of biographies, popular history and short stories.

== Work ==
Krampner's first book, The Man in the Shadows: Fred Coe and the Golden Age of Television, a biography of television producer Fred Coe, was published in 1997. A second, Female Brando: The Legend of Kim Stanley, followed in 2006 and charted the life of the Broadway actress Kim Stanley. His third book, Creamy and Crunchy: An Informal History of Peanut Butter, the All-American Food was published in 2012. The book is a popular history of peanut butter.

His book, Ernest Lehman: The Sweet Smell of Success (2022), was published by the University Press of Kentucky. Ernest Lehman was the screenwriter of films such as Somebody Up There Likes Me, Sweet Smell of Success, North By Northwest, West Side Story, The Sound of Music, and Who's Afraid of Virginia Woolf?

His next book will be Second-Place Mo: Morris Udall '76 and the Twilight of Democratic Liberalism, to be published by Michigan State University Press in March 2027. It has garnered advance praise from George Will, Curtis Wilkie, and former U.S. Senators Russ Feingold and Tom Harkin.

Krampner is also the author of short stories, including The Provence Lane Haunting (2002), The Mazeroski Blues (2016), and Why I Built My House the Way I Did (2017).

Krampner’s collected papers, consisting of research notes, interview transcripts and audiotapes and general material, are held in the special collections department of the Heard Library at Vanderbilt University in Nashville, Tennessee.

== Critical reception ==
In its review of The Man in the Shadows, Publishers Weekly wrote, "Krampner weaves Coe’s story with solid writing, subtle humor and a slavish devotion to detail." Time called it "engrossing" and TV Guide, "valuable."

Female Brando was described by Talkin’ Broadway as "a must-read for anyone interested in actors and the Golden Age of American Theatre. It is well researched, [...] includes extensive and detailed notes, and is generally fascinating.” The New Yorker said it was "crucial", while Kirkus Reviews said it presented "a steadily turning kaleidoscope of vivid, unsettling images."

The New Yorker also praised Creamy and Crunchy, calling it “enjoyable and informative”. Harvard Business Review described it as "scholarly, yet charming and entertaining."

== Bibliography ==
- The Man in the Shadows: Fred Coe and the Golden Age of Television (Rutgers University Press, 1997)
- The Provence Lane Haunting (Eclipse: A Literary Journal, 2002)
- Female Brando: The Legend of Kim Stanley (Backstage Books/Watson-Guptill, 2006)
- Creamy and Crunchy: An Informal History of Peanut Butter, the All-American Food (Columbia University Press, 2013)
- Joe Wilson: What He Didn’t Find in Africa (Smashwords, 2015)
- The Mazeroski Blues (Across the Margin, 2016)
- Why I Built My House the Way I Did (Across the Margin, 2017)
- Ernest Lehman: The Sweet Smell of Success (University Press of Kentucky, 2022)
