= Fred Coe =

American theatre, film, and television director & producer (1914-1979)

- Born: Frederick Hayden Hughs Coe; December 23, 1914; Alligator, Mississippi, U.S.
- Died: April 29, 1979 (aged 64); Los Angeles, California, U.S.
- Education: Peabody College; Yale Drama School
- Occupations: Director, producer
- Years active: 1945–1979

Frederick Hayden Hughs Coe (December 23, 1914 – April 29, 1979) was an American director and producer, of theatre, television, and film. He was nominated for the Tony Award for Best Play a total of six times, winning in 1960 for the original production of The Miracle Worker.

To television audiences, he was known for his contributions to dramatic anthology programs during the Golden Age of Television. He won two Emmy Awards, out of six total nominations. He was also nominated for an Academy Award for Best Picture for the film A Thousand Clowns (1965), which he both produced and directed.

== Early life ==
Frederick Hayden Hughs Coe was born on December 23, 1914, in Alligator, Mississippi. His father, F. H. H. Coe, was an attorney; his mother, Annette Harrell Coe, was a nurse. Coe grew up in Buckhorn, Kentucky, and Nashville, Tennessee. He attended Peabody Demonstration School in Nashville and Peabody College, before studying at the Yale Drama School. While he lived in Nashville he was active with the Nashville Community Playhouse and founded the Hillsboro Players.

Coe went to Columbia, South Carolina, in 1940 after his graduate work at Yale. There he was director and manager of the Town Theater, which he developed into a venue for new plays. Coe served in the U.S. Army Air Forces during World War II.

== Career ==
=== Television ===
He started as a production manager at NBC in 1945. Coe made his mark in the early years of network television when Lights Out moved from radio to TV on July 3, 1946. Variety reviewed:

Credit for the show's all-around excellence belongs jointly to scripter Wyllis Cooper and producer Fred Coe. Cooper was the last writer of the radio version with an eight-week series on the NBC net last summer. (Show returns for eight weeks Sat. (6) as replacement for Judy Canova). He followed Arch Oboler at the task and has made the switch from radio to tele without a single letdown in the program's eerie quality. Coe, whose light on NBC television has been partly hidden in the past by Ed Sobol and Ernie Colling, both of whom won ATS awards this last year, has come into his own with this show and should now rank right at the top of the heap. Story, titled First Person Singular, concerned a psychopathic killer whose wife's constant nagging, extreme sloppiness, etc., led him to strangle her in their apartment on one of those blistering summer evenings. Killer was never seen, with the camera following the action and taking in just what the eyes of the murderer would see. Thoughts in the killer's subconscious, meanwhile, told what might go on in the mind of such a person as he contemplates his crime, is convicted in court and then hanged. Coe achieved some admirable effects with the camera, drawing the viewer both into the killer's mind and into the action. Use of a spiral montage effect bridged the gap between scenes very well and the integration of film to point up the killer's dream of a cool, placid existence and to heighten the shock effect as the hangman ended his life was excellent. Technical director Bill States was on the beam with the controls in following Coe's direction.

Coe became executive producer of Mr. Peepers in 1952 and kept that job until 1955. The program won a Peabody Award in 1953. He won an Emmy Award in 1954 as Best Producer of a Live Series for his work on Producers' Showcase.

==== Relationship with writers ====
Coe encouraged writers, including Paddy Chayefsky, Horton Foote, Tad Mosel, JP Miller, Summer Locke Elliott, Robert Alan Aurthur, and Gore Vidal. Numerous important actors appeared on Coe's shows, which were directed by, among others, Vincent Donohue, Delbert Mann and Arthur Penn.

=== Broadway ===
Coe also was a significant producer on Broadway. His plays include The Trip to Bountiful, The Miracle Worker, Two for the Seesaw, All the Way Home, A Thousand Clowns, and Wait Until Dark.

=== Film ===
Subsequent to his work in television and theatre, he also produced and directed several films, many of which he previously produced on Broadway such as The Miracle Worker and A Thousand Clowns. The latter film was his directorial debut and was nominated for four Academy awards.

== Personal life ==
Coe was married to, and divorced from, Alice Griggs, and they had two children. At the time of his death he was legally separated from his second wife, Joyce Beeler, with whom he had two children.

=== Death ===
He died of a heart attack on April 29, 1979, in Los Angeles, aged 64. He is buried in Green River Cemetery in Springs, New York.

== Legacy ==
His biography, The Man in the Shadows: Fred Coe and the Golden Age of Television by Jon Krampner, was published by Rutgers University Press in 1997. The UCLA Film and Television Archive has kinescopes of many Coe productions and has made some digital transfers. The Wisconsin Center for Film and Theater Research also has kinescopes.

== Filmography ==
- The Left Handed Gun (1958) (producer)
- The Miracle Worker (1962) (producer)
- A Thousand Clowns (1965) (director, producer)
- Me, Natalie (1969) (director)
