= City in Fear (TV series) =

American documentary television program

- Genre: Documentary
- Created by: 44 Blue Productions
- Country of origin: United States
- Original language: English

Production
- Running time: 60 minutes (incl ads)

Original release
- Network: MSNBC
- Release: present

City In Fear is a 10-episode documentary television programme produced by 44 Blue Productions in the United States for the television station MSNBC.

This documentary investigates many violent events that shocked communities across the US in modern history, such as the 1993 Waco Siege, the 1999 Columbine High School massacre, the Beltway sniper attacks and the Los Angeles riots of 1992. It reveals the events that led up to each case; the causes of the events, as well as the aftermath and how it affected the community. It also investigated whether each event could have been prevented or stopped sooner.

== List of subjects investigated ==
- Columbine High School Massacre
- Gianni Versace Murder
- the Beltway sniper attacks
- LA Riots
- The Hillside Strangler
- BTK (Dennis Rader)
- Chicago Tylenol murders
- The Night Stalker (Richard Ramírez)
- Atlanta child murders
- Waco siege
