= Thieves (play) =

- Original language: English
- Written by: Herb Gardner
- Characters: Martin Cramer, Sally Cramer

Premiere
- Date: 1974
- Place: Broadway, New York City

Thieves is a play by Herb Gardner.

== Plot ==
Its focus is on Martin and Sally Cramer, whose twelve-year marriage is slowly disintegrating. He has become the stuffy headmaster of a fashionable Manhattan private school, while she clings to her dedication to the underprivileged and continues to teach in a ghetto public school. For him, their new high-rise apartment is a sign of their steady upward mobility; she is so unhappy with his need to earn and spend she moves all the antique furniture he has purchased to their first apartment on the Lower East Side. The growing chasm between them isn't helped by individual one-night stands, an unwanted pregnancy and consequent contemplation of abortion, an attempted mugging, and her racist cab driver father Joe Kaminsky.

== Production ==
The play started its out of town tryout in Boston. As Charles Grodin relates, Marlo Thomas called him in the winter of 1974 to say that the director, Michael Bennett had left the show and the star (unnamed) had also left. Herb Gardner asked Marlo to assume the lead, and Marlo agreed, if Grodin would agree to direct. Grodin ended by writing: "Being involved with it remains the most gratifying experience I've had in the theater." People Magazine reported that the leading lady, Valerie Harper, and Michael Bennett had left the show and that Grodin and Thomas had joined it.

The play premiered on Broadway at the Broadhurst Theatre on April 7, 1974 and transferred to the Longacre Theatre on November 11, 1974, closing on January 4, 1975 after 313 performances and 12 previews. Directed by Charles Grodin, the cast included Richard Mulligan as Martin, Marlo Thomas as Sally, and Irwin Corey as Joe, with Ann Wedgeworth, William Hickey and Dick Van Patten in supporting roles.

In an author's note in the script, Gardner wrote: "The entire set should be only a series of platforms and skeletal outlines to indicate the apartments and terraces. The fact of a character will tell us what must be around him."

== Film ==
Gardner adapted his play for a feature film directed by John Berry, which was released in February 1977. Thomas and Corey reprised their stage roles for the Paramount Pictures release, with Charles Grodin as Martin and Hector Elizondo, Mercedes McCambridge, John McMartin, Gary Merrill, and Bob Fosse in supporting roles.
