= Herb Gardner =

American artist, playwright, and screenwriter (1934–2003)

- Born: Herbert George Gardner; December 28, 1934; New York City, New York, U.S.
- Died: September 24, 2003 (aged 68); New York City, New York, U.S.
- Education: High School of Performing Arts; Carnegie Mellon University; Antioch College
- Occupations: Commercial artist, cartoonist, playwright, screenwriter
- Spouse(s): Rita Gardner (m. 1957, div. 1970); Barbara Sproul (m. 1978–his death)
- Children: 2

Herbert George Gardner (December 28, 1934 – September 24, 2003) was an American commercial artist, cartoonist, playwright and screenwriter.

== Early life ==
Born in Brooklyn, New York, Gardner was the son of a bar owner. His family was Jewish. Gardner's late brother, Robert Allen Gardner, was a professor of comparative psychology at the University of Nevada, Reno and is famous for teaming with his wife Beatrix Gardner on Project Washoe, the attempt to teach American Sign Language to a chimpanzee named Washoe.

== Comic strip ==
Gardner was educated at New York's High School of Performing Arts, Carnegie-Mellon University and Antioch College. While a student at Antioch, he began drawing The Nebbishes. The comic strip was picked up by the Chicago Tribune and syndicated to 60-75 major newspapers from 1959 to 1961. Even before syndication, the Gardner characters were a national craze, marketed on statuettes, studio cards, barware (including cocktail napkins), wall decorations and posters. In 1960, after "the balloons were getting larger and larger, and there was hardly any drawing left", he dropped it and began writing plays.

== Plays and films ==
Gardner is best known for his 1962 play A Thousand Clowns, which ran for 428 performances. He received an Oscar nomination for the screenplay for the successful 1965 movie adaptation. The play was revived in 1996 and 2001. Both the 1962 play and the movie starred Jason Robards Jr. as Murray Burns, a charming, unemployed children's show writer, who is forced to choose between social conformity and the probable loss of custody of his 11-year-old nephew to the Child Welfare Bureau. The Robards character was in part based on Gardner's friend at that time, humorist Jean Shepherd. In 2000, Robards wrote:

I feel A Thousand Clowns is his masterpiece. It is a real human comedy of poignancy and laughter, with all of humanity's foibles and eccentricities. There is a great depth of love and understanding for all in this play. There are great life lessons to learn daily, which I find myself still doing. For Herb Gardner to have written this play in his early twenties is a miracle.

Gardner's biggest commercial success was the 1985 play I'm Not Rappaport, which ran for two years, won the Tony Award for Best Play and became the basis for a 1996 movie.

Other Broadway credits include The Goodbye People (1968), Thieves (1974), and Conversations with My Father (1992). He collaborated with Jule Styne on the ill-fated 1980 musical One Night Stand.

== Other works ==
Gardner's autobiographical novel, A Piece of the Action, was published in 1958. Gardner was the screenwriter and co-producer of the 1971 motion picture Who Is Harry Kellerman, and Why Is He Saying Those Terrible Things About Me?, which starred Dustin Hoffman.

== Personal life ==
Gardner married his first wife, actress Rita Gardner (née Schier), in 1957. The marriage ended in divorce in 1970.

In the late 1960s and early 1970s, he was the boyfriend of actress Marlo Thomas.

In 1978 Gardner married Barbara Sproul, professor of religion at Hunter College, with whom he raised two adopted sons, Jake Gardner and Rafferty Gardner. They remained married until his death.

== Death ==
Gardner died in his Manhattan apartment from complications of lung disease on September 25, 2003, aged 68.
