= 1988 in film =

The following is an overview of events in 1988 in film, including the highest-grossing films, award ceremonies and festivals, a list of films released and notable deaths.

== Highest-grossing films ==
The top 10 films released in 1988 by worldwide gross are as follows:

Highest-grossing films of 1988
Rank	Title	Distributor	Worldwide gross
1	Rain Man	MGM / UA	$354,825,435
2	Who Framed Roger Rabbit	Buena Vista	$329,803,958
3	Coming to America	Paramount	$288,752,301
4	Crocodile Dundee II	Paramount	$239,606,210
5	Twins	Universal	$216,614,388
6	Rambo III	Tri-Star	$189,015,611
7	A Fish Called Wanda	MGM	$188,597,000
8	Cocktail	Buena Vista	$171,504,781
9	Big	20th Century Fox	$151,668,774
10	Die Hard	20th Century Fox	$141,500,000

== Events ==
- May 25 – Rambo III is released as the most expensive film ever made with a production budget between $58 and $63 million. The film fails to match the box office earnings from Rambo: First Blood Part II (1985).
- June 26 – Michael Keaton is first announced to play comic book superhero Batman in a forthcoming feature film to be directed by Tim Burton and co–starring Jack Nicholson as Batman's arch nemesis, The Joker.
- July 15 – Die Hard defies low commercial expectations to gross $141.5 million worldwide. Hailed as an influential landmark in the action film genre, it influences a common formula for many action films in the 1990s, featuring a lone everyman against a colorful terrorist character who is usually holding hostages in an isolated setting.
- September 19 – English character actor Roy Kinnear suffers a fall from a horse which will prove fatal while filming The Return of the Musketeers in Toledo, Spain.
- October 10 – Batman officially commences filming at Pinewood Studios in Buckinghamshire, England.
- October 27 – E.T. the Extra-Terrestrial is released on VHS and LaserDisc. In order to combat piracy, the tapeguards and tape hubs on the videocassettes are colored green, and the tape itself is affixed with a small, holographic sticker of the 1963 Universal logo (much like the holograms on a credit card), and encoded with Macrovision. In North America alone, VHS sales come to $75 million.
- December 16 – Rain Man is released to critical and commercial success and becomes the highest grossing film of 1988 worldwide with a gross of $355 million. Winning four Academy Awards including Best Picture, it is the last MGM title to be nominated for Best Picture until Licorice Pizza (2021) 33 years later. Giancarlo Parretti and Max Théret acquire a 52% stake in Pathé.

== Awards ==
Category/Organization	46th Golden Globe Awards January 28, 1989		42nd BAFTA Awards March 19, 1989	61st Academy Awards March 29, 1989
Category/Organization	Drama	Musical or Comedy	42nd BAFTA Awards March 19, 1989	61st Academy Awards March 29, 1989
Best Film	Rain Man	Working Girl	The Last Emperor	Rain Man
Best Director	Clint Eastwood; Bird		Louis Malle; Au revoir les enfants	Barry Levinson; Rain Man
Best Actor	Dustin Hoffman; Rain Man	Tom Hanks; Big	John Cleese; A Fish Called Wanda	Dustin Hoffman; Rain Man
Best Actress	Jodie Foster; The Accused; Shirley MacLaine; Madame Sousatzka; Sigourney Weaver; Gorillas in the Mist	Melanie Griffith; Working Girl	Maggie Smith; The Lonely Passion of Judith Hearne	Jodie Foster; The Accused
Best Supporting Actor	Martin Landau; Tucker: The Man and His Dream		Michael Palin; A Fish Called Wanda	Kevin Kline; A Fish Called Wanda
Best Supporting Actress	Sigourney Weaver; Working Girl		Judi Dench; A Handful of Dust	Geena Davis; The Accidental Tourist
Best Screenplay, Adapted	Naomi Foner Gyllenhaal; Running on Empty		Jean-Claude Carrière and Philip Kaufman; The Unbearable Lightness of Being	Christopher Hampton; Dangerous Liaisons
Best Screenplay, Original	Naomi Foner Gyllenhaal; Running on Empty		Shawn Slovo A World Apart	Ronald Bass and Barry Morrow; Rain Man
Best Original Score	Maurice Jarre; Gorillas in the Mist		John Williams; Empire of the Sun	Dave Grusin; The Milagro Beanfield War
Best Original Song	"Two Hearts"; Buster "Let the River Run"; Working Girl		N/A	"Let the River Run"; Working Girl
Best Foreign Language Film	Pelle the Conqueror		Babette's Feast	Pelle the Conqueror

Palme d'Or (Cannes Film Festival)

Pelle the Conqueror (Pelle erobreren), directed by Bille August, Denmark

Golden Lion (Venice Film Festival)

La leggenda del santo bevitore (The Legend of the Holy Drinker), directed by Ermanno Olmi, Italy / France

Golden Bear (Berlin International Film Festival)

Red Sorghum (Hong gao liang), directed by Zhang Yimou, China

People's Choice Award (Toronto International Film Festival):

Women on the Verge of a Nervous Breakdown (Mujeres al borde de un ataque de nervios), directed by Pedro Almodóvar, Spain

== 1988 films ==
=== By country/region ===
- List of American films of 1988
- List of Argentine films of 1988
- List of Australian films of 1988
- List of Bangladeshi films of 1988
- List of British films of 1988
- List of Canadian films of 1988
- List of French films of 1988
- List of Hong Kong films of 1988
- List of Indian films of 1988
  - List of Hindi films of 1988
  - List of Kannada films of 1988
  - List of Malayalam films of 1988
  - List of Marathi films of 1988
  - List of Tamil films of 1988
  - List of Telugu films of 1988
- List of Japanese films of 1988
- List of Mexican films of 1988
- List of Pakistani films of 1988
- List of South Korean films of 1988
- List of Soviet films of 1988
- List of Spanish films of 1988

=== By genre/medium ===
- List of action films of 1988
- List of animated feature films of 1988
- List of avant-garde films of 1988
- List of comedy films of 1988
- List of drama films of 1988
- List of horror films of 1988
- List of science fiction films of 1988
- List of thriller films of 1988
- List of western films of 1988

== Births ==
- January 3 – Karl Glusman, American actor
- January 6 – Mehwish Hayat, Pakistani actress
- January 7 – Haley Bennett, American actress and singer
- January 12 – Andrew Lawrence, American actor
- January 14 – Tom Rosenthal, English actor, comedian and writer
- January 21 – John Early, American comedian and actor
- February 2
  - Amadou Ly, Senegalese-born American actor, writer and producer
  - Zosia Mamet, American actress and musician
- February 6 – Anna Diop, Senegalese-born American actress
- February 8 – Ryan Pinkston, American actor
- February 10 - Daniel Kwan, American filmmaker (Daniels)
- February 11 – Jazz Raycole, American actress
- February 12
  - Afshan Azad, British actress, model and media personality
  - Nana Eikura, Japanese actress
- February 13
  - Ferdinand Kingsley, British actor
  - Erica Mendez, American voice actress
- February 16 – Steven Caple Jr., American director, producer and screenwriter
- February 17 – Nagita Slavina, Indonesian actress, television host, film producer, and singer
- February 18
  - Sarah Sutherland, Canadian-American actress
  - Maiara Walsh, American actress
- February 20
  - Rihanna, Barbadian singer, songwriter and actress
  - Tracy Spiridakos, Canadian actress
- February 29
  - Reilly Dolman, Canadian actor
  - Langston Fishburne, American actor
- March 4
  - Josh Bowman, English actor
  - Cody Longo, American actor (died 2023)
- March 21
  - Luke Brandon Field, English actor and musician
  - Kevin Guthrie, Scottish actor
- March 22 – Tania Raymonde, American actress
- March 24 – Finn Jones, English actor
- March 25 – Erik Knudsen, Canadian actor
- March 27
  - Brenda Song, American actress, singer and model
  - Holliday Grainger, English actress
- March 29 - Ansu Kabia, British actor
- April 2 – Jesse Plemons, American actor
- April 3 – Ruby Bentall, English actress
- April 4 – Maggie Geha, American actress and model
- April 6 – Mike Bailey, English actor
- April 10
  - Molly Bernard, American actress
  - Haley Joel Osment, American actor
- April 13
  - Allison Williams, American actress
  - Katie Lucas, American actress and writer
- April 14
  - Ben Lloyd-Hughes, British actor
  - Chris Wood, American actor
- April 18 – Vanessa Kirby, English actress
- April 21
  - Robbie Amell, Canadian actor and producer
  - Christoph Sanders, American actor
- April 23 – Carla Quevedo, Argentine actress
- April 25
  - Jonathan Bailey, English actor
  - Sara Paxton, American singer and actress
- April 27
  - Lizzo, American singer, actress, and flautist
  - Regé-Jean Page, British actor
- April 30 – Ana de Armas, Cuban actress
- May 1
  - Nicholas Braun, American actor
  - Anushka Sharma, Indian actress
- May 2 – Laura Brent, Australian actress
- May 3 – Remington Hoffman, American actor and director
- May 7 – Brandon Jones, American actor, producer and musician
- May 16 – Jermaine Fowler, American actor, comedian, producer and writer
- May 17 – Nikki Reed, American actress and writer
- May 22 - Heida Reed, Icelandic actress
- May 24 - Callie Hernandez, American actress
- May 25 - Ashley Whillans, Canadian-American former actress
- June 2 – Awkwafina, American actress, comedian, writer, producer and rapper
- June 4 – Li Man, Chinese actress
- June 5 – Nuh Omar, Pakistani writer and director
- June 6 - Gideon Glick, American actor
- June 7 – Michael Cera, Canadian actor
- June 9
  - Lauren Landa, American voice actress
  - Mae Whitman, American actress
- June 11 - Claire Holt, Australian-American actress
- June 12 - Cody Horn, American actress
- June 13 – Cody Walker, American actor
- June 14
  - Victoire Du Bois, French actress
  - Kevin McHale, American actor and singer
  - Dayo Okeniyi, Nigerian-American actor
- June 16 – Jonny Weston, American actor
- June 22
  - Shefali Chowdhury, British actress
  - Portia Doubleday, American actress
- June 23
  - Pippa Bennett-Warner, British actress
  - Isabella Leong, Hong Kong singer, actress and model
- June 25 – Daniel Webber, Australian actor
- July 1 - Evan Ellingson, American actor (died 2023)
- July 2 – Edward Randell, English musician and actor
- July 4 - Luke Thompson, English actor
- July 6 - Cody Fern, Australian director and actor
- July 7 – Jack Whitehall, English actor, comedian, presenter and writer
- July 8 - Shazad Latif, British actor
- July 10 – Pavlo Lee, Ukrainian actor (died 2022)
- July 12 – Christine Marie Cabanos, American voice actress
- July 13 – Chris Sheffield, American actor
- July 14 – Elise Gatien, Canadian actress
- July 15 – Aimee Carrero, Dominican-born American actress
- July 18
  - Ambyr Childers, American actress
  - Chen Tang, Chinese-American actor
- July 19 – Cherami Leigh, American voice actress
- July 20
  - Chloe Fineman, American actress and comedian
  - Julianne Hough, American dancer, actress, singer and songwriter
- July 21 - Jing Tian, Chinese actress
- July 24 – Joe Pera, American comedian, writer and actor
- July 25 – Mamoudou Athie, Mauritanian-American actor and producer
- July 26 – Francia Raisa, American actress
- July 30 – Nico Tortorella, American actor and model
- July 31 – Charlie Carver, American actor
- August 1 – Max Carver, American actor
- August 16
  - Kevin Schmidt, American actor
  - Rumer Willis, American actress
- August 17 – Joyner Lucas, American rapper and actor
- August 23 - Kim Matula, American actress
- August 24 – Rupert Grint, English actor
- August 26
  - Evan Ross, American actor and musician
  - Danielle Savre, American actress
- August 27 – Alexa PenaVega, American actress and singer
- September 6 – Jovan Adepo, English actor
- September 8 – E. J. Bonilla, American actor
- September 12
  - Matt Martians, American record producer
  - Clara Paget, British actress
- September 15 - John Bradley, English actor
- September 17 – Ritu Arya, English actress
- September 19 – Celine Song, Canadian director, playwright, and screenwriter
- September 22 – Sana Saeed, Indian actress
- September 26 – Lilly Singh, Canadian comedian, former talk show host and YouTuber
- September 28
  - Olivia Jordan, American actress and model, Miss USA 2015
  - Hana Mae Lee, American actress, model and comedian
- October 1
  - Cariba Heine, Australian actress
  - Nick Whitaker, American actor
- October 3 – Alicia Vikander, Swedish actress
- October 4 – Melissa Benoist, American actress, singer and dancer
- October 5 – Bobby Edner, American actor and singer
- October 6 – Everlyn Sampi, Australian actress
- October 17 – Dee Jay Daniels, American former actor
- October 18 – Tessa Schram, Dutch actress and director
- October 21
  - Glen Powell, American actor, writer and producer
  - Mark Rendall, Canadian actor
- October 22
  - Corey Hawkins, American actor
  - Sharon Rooney, Scottish actress
- October 23 – Ritesh Rajan, American actor
- October 24 – May Hong, South Korean model, actress, and artist
- October 28 – Edd Gould, British animator, artist, writer, director and voice actor (died 2012)
- October 29 – Devon Murray, Irish actor
- November 6 – Emma Stone, American actress
- November 9
  - Nikki Blonsky, American singer and actress
  - Alexandrea Owens-Sarno, American actress
  - Lio Tipton (credited as Analeigh Tipton up to 2021), American model and actress
- November 12 – Alistair Brammer, English actor
- November 17 – Justin Cooper, American producer and former child actor
- November 20 – Demetrius Shipp Jr., American actor
- November 22
  - Jamie Campbell Bower, English actor and singer
  - Lily Frazer, English actress
- November 26 – Tamsin Egerton, English actress
- November 30
  - Rotimi, Nigerian-American actor and singer
  - Rebecca Rittenhouse, American actress
- December 1
  - Nadia Hilker, German actress and model
  - Yim Si-wan, Korean actor and singer
  - Zoë Kravitz, American actress
- December 2 – Alfred Enoch, English actor
- December 7
  - Emily Browning, Australian actress
  - Benjamin Clementine, British composer, musician and actor
- December 14 – Vanessa Hudgens, American actress and singer
- December 15 – Gregg Chillin, English actor and writer
- December 16
  - Aleksandr Pal, Russian actor
  - Anna Popplewell, English actress
  - Park Seo-joon, South Korean actor
- December 17
  - Rin Takanashi, Japanese actress and model
  - Aqueela Zoll, American actress
- December 21
  - Shelley Regner, American actress and singer
  - Teresa Ruiz, Mexican-American actress
- December 27 – Hera Hilmar, Icelandic actress
- December 28 – Iwan Lewis, Welsh actor
- December 30 - Jena Sims, American actress

== Deaths ==
Month	Date	Name	Age	Country	Profession	Notable films
January	1	Marcel Hillaire	79	Germany	Actor	Sabrina; Murderers' Row
January	7	Michel Auclair	65	France	Actor	The Day of the Jackal; Beauty and the Beast
January	7	Trevor Howard	74	UK	Actor	Brief Encounter; Mutiny on the Bounty
January	8	Boyd Morgan	72	US	Stuntman, Actor	Dirty Harry; Spartacus
January	10	Hugh A. Robertson	55	US	Film Editor, Director	Midnight Cowboy; Shaft
January	16	Ballard Berkeley	83	UK	Actor	National Lampoon's European Vacation; Stage Fright
January	19	Bridget Boland	75	UK	Screenwriter	War and Peace; Anne of the Thousand Days
January	19	Cary Odell	77	US	Art Director	From Here to Eternity; Cool Hand Luke
January	25	Colleen Moore	88	US	Actress	The Power and the Glory; The Scarlet Letter
February	1	Marcel Bozzuffi	58	French	Actor	The French Connection; Z
February	1	Heather O'Rourke	12	US	Actress	Poltergeist; Poltergeist II: The Other Side
February	5	Emeric Pressburger	85	Hungary	Screenwriter, Director	The Red Shoes; Black Narcissus
February	8	Allan Cuthbertson	67	Australia	Actor	The Guns of Navarone; Performance
February	14	Frederick Loewe	86	Germany	Composer	Gigi; The Little Prince
February	28	Asakazu Nakai	86	Japan	Cinematographer	Seven Samurai; Ran
February	29	Sidney Harmon	80	US	Producer, Screenwriter	Man Crazy; The Talk of the Town
March	1	Joe Besser	80	US	Actor	Africa Screams; Let's Make Love
March	3	Lois Wilson	93	US	Actress	The Covered Wagon; Miss Lulu Bett
March	5	Alberto Olmedo	54	Argentina	Actor, Comedian	Los caballeros de la cama redonda; Las Aventuras del Capitán Piluso en el Castillo del Terror
March	6	Jeanne Aubert	82	France	Actress	La Possession; Mirages
March	7	Divine	42	US	Actor	Pink Flamingos; Hairspray
March	7	Robert Livingston	83	US	Actor	The Three Mesquiteers; The Lone Ranger Rides Again
March	12	DeWitt Bodeen	79	US	Screenwriter	Cat People; I Remember Mama
March	12	Karen Steele	56	US	Actress	Marty; Ride Lonesome
March	13	Steno	71	Italy	Director, Screenwriter	An American in Rome; Banana Joe
March	13	John Holmes	43	US	Actor	Insatiable; Fantasm
March	13	Olive Carey	92	US	Actress	The Searchers; The Alamo
March	16	Dorothy Adams	88	US	Actress	Lady Gangster; Laura
March	27	Renato Salvatori	55	Italy	Actor	Big Deal on Madonna Street; Two Women
March	31	Manuel Silos	82	Philippines	Actor, Director	Blessings of the Land
April	1	Jim Jordan	91	US	Actor	Look Who's Laughing; The Rescuers
April	5	Alf Kjellin	68	Sweden	Actor, Director	Assault on a Queen; Ice Station Zebra
April	6	John Clements	77	UK	Actor	Gandhi; Things to Come
April	7	Albert S. Rogell	86	US	Director	In Old Oklahoma; The Black Cat
April	11	Jeff Donnell	66	US	Actress	In a Lonely Place; Gidget Goes Hawaiian
April	11	Jesse L. Lasky Jr.	77	US	Screenwriter	The Ten Commandments; Samson and Delilah
April	15	Kenneth Williams	62	UK	Actor	Carry On; The Hound of the Baskervilles
April	21	I. A. L. Diamond	67	Moldovia	Screenwriter	Some Like It Hot; The Apartment
April	22	Irene Rich	96	US	Actress	They Had to See Paris; The Champ
April	28	Andrew Cruickshank	80	UK	Actor	El Cid; The Cruel Sea
May	1	Paolo Stoppa	81	Italy	Actor	The Leopard; Once Upon a Time in the West
May	4	Tom Overton	58	US	Sound Engineer	Star Trek: The Motion Picture; A Star Is Born
May	5	George Rose	68	UK	Actor	A Night to Remember; Hamlet
May	12	Paul Osborn	86	US	Screenwriter	East of Eden; Sayonara
May	15	Andrew Duggan	64	US	Actor	What Ever Happened to Baby Jane?; Seven Days in May
May	15	Greta Nissen	82	Norway	Actress	Red Wagon; The Luck of a Sailor
May	18	Daws Butler	71	US	Voice Actor	Mary Poppins; Hey There, It's Yogi Bear!
May	18	Anthony Forwood	72	UK	Actor	Captain Horatio Hornblower R.N.; Knights of the Round Table
May	18	Christopher Gore	43	US	Screenwriter	Fame
May	21	Barbara Laage	67	France	Actress	The Happy Road; Paris Blues
May	22	Tom Adair	74	US	Lyricist	Julie; Sleeping Beauty
May	29	Vladimír Menšík	59	Czech Republic	Actor	September Nights; Three Wishes for Cinderella
May	30	Ella Raines	67	US	Actress	Brute Force; Hail the Conquering Hero
June	2	Raj Kapoor	63	India	Actor, Director, Producer	Awaara; Mera Naam Joker
June	16	Kim Milford	37	US	Actor	Laserblast; Corvette Summer
June	18	Wilford Leach	58	US	Director, Screenwriter	The Wedding Party; The Pirates of Penzance
June	19	Teru Shimada	82	Japan	Actor	You Only Live Twice; Tokyo Joe
June	22	Dennis Day	77	US	Singer, Actor	I'll Get By; Golden Girl
June	22	Stuart Randall	78	US	Actor	Pony Soldier; Naked Alibi
July	1	Alice Nunn	60	US	Actress	Pee-wee's Big Adventure; Mommie Dearest
July	2	Aldo Tonti	78	Italy	Cinematographer	Nights of Cabiria; Reflections in a Golden Eye
July	7	Jimmy Edwards	68	UK	Actor	The Bed-Sitting Room; The Plank
July	12	Joshua Logan	79	US	Director, Screenwriter	Mister Roberts; Paint Your Wagon
July	22	Milton Krasner	84	US	Cinematographer	All About Eve; An Affair to Remember
July	22	Patrick Newell	56	UK	Actor	Young Sherlock Holmes; Becket
July	25	Judith Barsi	10	US	Actress	The Land Before Time; Jaws: The Revenge
July	25	Douglas Hickox	59	UK	Director	Theatre of Blood; Zulu Dawn
July	27	Larry Clemmons	81	US	Animator, Screenwriter	The Jungle Book; The Aristocats
July	31	Trinidad Silva	38	US	Actor	Colors; UHF
August	1	Florence Eldridge	86	US	Actress	Inherit the Wind; Les Misérables
August	2	Robert Emmet Smith	73	US	Art Director	King Rat; Operation Petticoat
August	5	Colin Higgins	47	France	Director, Producer, Screenwriter	Harold and Maude; 9 to 5
August	5	Ralph Meeker	65	US	Actor	Kiss Me Deadly; The Dirty Dozen
August	7	Wilfred Jackson	82	US	Animator	Snow White and the Seven Dwarfs; Fantasia
August	8	Alan Napier	85	UK	Actor	Joan of Arc; Batman
August	10	Adela Rogers St. Johns	94	US	Screenwriter	What Price Hollywood?; A Free Soul
August	11	Anne Ramsey	59	US	Actress	The Goonies; Throw Momma from the Train
August	17	Victoria Shaw	53	Australia	Actress	The Eddy Duchin Story; Edge of Eternity
August	19	Don Haggerty	74	US	Actor	Cause for Alarm!; Footsteps in the Night
August	23	Jack Sher	75	US	Screenwriter, Director	The Kid from Left Field; Four Girls in Town
August	24	Leonard Frey	49	US	Actor	Fiddler on the Roof; Where the Buffalo Roam
August	26	Milton Sperling	76	US	Screenwriter	Battle of the Bulge; The Court-Martial of Billy Mitchell
August	27	Charles Farrell	88	Ireland	Actor	Night and the City; The Crimson Pirate
September	1	Hugh Hunt	86	US	Set Decorator	Ben-Hur; Julius Caesar
September	5	Gert Fröbe	75	Germany	Actor	Goldfinger; The Longest Day
September	6	Harold Rosson	93	US	Cinematographer	The Wizard of Oz; Singin' in the Rain
September	12	Stephen B. Grimes	61	UK	Production Designer	The Way We Were; Out of Africa
September	14	Louis Quinn	73	US	Actor	All the President's Men; Ocean's 11
September	15	Samuel E. Beetley	74	US	Film Editor	The Longest Day; Doctor Dolittle
September	20	Roy Kinnear	54	UK	Actor	Help!; Willy Wonka & the Chocolate Factory
September	21	Henry Koster	83	Germany	Director, Screenwriter	Harvey; The Bishop's Wife
September	21	Christine Norden	63	UK	Actress	Mine Own Executioner; The Black Widow
September	30	Chick Chandler	83	US	Actor	Seven Doors to Death; Hideout
October	1	Lucien Ballard	84	US	Cinematographer	The Wild Bunch; The Killing
October	1	Pavle Vuisić	62	Serbia	Actor	Battle of Neretva; Doktor Mladen
October	4	Margaret Lacey	76	UK	Actress	Diamonds Are Forever; The Ruling Class
October	6	Don Terry	86	US	Actor	Who Killed Gail Preston?; Unseen Enemy
October	9	Edward Chodorov	84	US	Screenwriter	Road House; Kind Lady
October	11	Morgan Farley	90	US	Actor	The Winner's Circle; High Noon
October	11	Bonita Granville	65	US	Actress	Nancy Drew... Detective; These Three
October	12	Ken Murray	85	US	Actor, Producer	The Man Who Shot Liberty Valance; Son of Flubber
October	13	Melvin Frank	75	US	Screenwriter, Director	Mr. Blandings Builds His Dream House; Road to Utopia
October	14	Mary Morris	72	Fiji	Actress	The Thief of Bagdad; Undercover
October	19	Lawrence W. Butler	80	US	Special Effects Artist	Casablanca; The Caine Mutiny
October	24	Valerie Taylor	85	UK	Actress	Repulsion; Went the Day Well?
October	25	Eric Larson	83	US	Animator	Alice in Wonderland; The Jungle Book
October	27	Charles Hawtrey	73	UK	Actor	Sabotage; The Ghost of St. Michael's
October	31	John Houseman	86	Romania	Actor, Producer	The Paper Chase; Rollerball
November	1	George J. Folsey	90	US	Cinematographer	Forbidden Planet; Adam's Rib
November	2	Lukas Heller	58	Germany	Screenwriter	The Dirty Dozen; What Ever Happened to Baby Jane?
November	3	Sidney Carroll	75	US	Screenwriter	The Hustler; A Big Hand for the Little Lady
November	6	John Hubbard	74	US	Actor	One Million B.C.; The Tall T
November	9	Billy Curtis	79	US	Actor	The Wizard of Oz; High Plains Drifter
November	15	Mona Washbourne	84	UK	Actress	My Fair Lady; Casino Royale
November	27	Angela Aames	32	US	Actress	Scarface; Bachelor Party
November	27	John Carradine	82	US	Actor	Stagecoach; The Grapes of Wrath
December	7	Christopher Connelly	47	US	Actor	Benji; Move Over, Darling
December	7	Dorothy Jordan	82	US	Actress	The Searchers; 70,000 Witnesses
December	8	Anne Seymour	79	US	Actress	All the King's Men; Field of Dreams
December	15	Maria De Matteis	90	Italy	Costume Designer	War and Peace; The Bible: In the Beginning...
December	10	Richard S. Castellano	55	US	Actor	The Godfather; Love with the Proper Stranger
December	10	Dennis Arundell	90	UK	Actor, Composer	The Life and Death of Colonel Blimp; "Pimpernel" Smith
December	17	Jerry Hopper	81	US	Director	The Private War of Major Benson; Pony Express
December	21	Bob Steele	81	US	Actor	The Big Sleep; The Colorado Kid
December	22	Tucker Smith	52	US	Actor, Dancer	West Side Story; The Producers
December	24	Noel Willman	70	Ireland	Actor	Doctor Zhivago; The Man Who Knew Too Much
December	26	Julanne Johnston	88	US	Actress	The Thief of Bagdad; Dame Chance
December	26	John Loder	90	UK	Actor	Now, Voyager; Sabotage
December	27	Hal Ashby	59	US	Director, Film Editor	Harold and Maude; Being There

== Film debuts ==
- Tim Allen – Tropical Snow
- Gabrielle Anwar – Manifesto
- Stephen Baldwin – Homeboy
- Ned Bellamy – The Night Before
- Annette Bening – The Great Outdoors
- Patrick Bergin – Taffin
- Thora Birch – Purple People Eater
- Lara Flynn Boyle – Poltergeist III
- Benjamin Bratt – Lovers, Partners & Spies
- Reg E. Cathey – Funny Farm
- Macaulay Culkin – Rocket Gibraltar
- Vondie Curtis-Hall – Coming to America
- Matt Damon – Mystic Pizza
- Benicio del Toro – Big Top Pee-wee
- Stephen Dillane – Business as Usual
- David Duchovny – Working Girl
- Kevin Dunn – Mississippi Burning
- Nora Dunn – Working Girl
- Richard Fancy – Sunset
- Colm Feore – Iron Eagle II
- Iain Glen – Paris by Night
- Cuba Gooding, Jr. – Coming to America
- Clark Gregg – Things Change
- Jess Harnell – Boulevard of Broken Dreams
- Frank Harper – For Queen and Country
- Danielle Harris – Halloween 4: The Return of Michael Myers
- Neil Patrick Harris – Clara's Heart
- Jane Horrocks – The Dressmaker
- Felicity Huffman – Things Change
- Marceline Hugot – Working Girl
- Bonnie Hunt – Rain Man
- Gregory Jbara – The House on Carroll Street
- Milla Jovovich – Two Moon Junction
- Jenifer Lewis – Beaches
- Jane Lynch – Vice Versa
- Marc Macaulay – Graverobbers
- Kevin McNulty – Shoot to Kill
- Graham McTavish – For Queen and Country
- David Morrissey – Drowning by Numbers
- Dermot Mulroney – Sunset
- Clive Owen – Vroom
- Vincent Pastore – Black Roses
- Harold Perrineau – Shakedown
- David Hyde Pierce – Bright Lights, Big City
- Oliver Platt – Married to the Mob
- Bruce Ramsay – Pin
- Noomi Rapace – In the Shadow of the Raven
- Alan Rickman – Die Hard
- Katja Riemann – Faust - Vom Himmel durch die Welt zur Hölle
- Julia Roberts – Satisfaction
- Stephen Root – Crocodile Dundee II
- Richard Schiff – Medium Straight
- Rusty Schwimmer – Memories of Me
- Steven Seagal – Above the Law
- Suzanne Shepherd – Mystic Pizza
- Roger Guenveur Smith – School Daze
- Lili Taylor – She's Having a Baby
- David Thornton – Diamond Run
- Stanley Townsend – Taffin
- Goran Višnjić – Braća po materi
- Marlon Wayans – I'm Gonna Git You Sucka
- Duane Whitaker – Deadly Dreams
- Gregory Alan Williams – Above the Law
