= 38th Academy Awards =

- Official poster
- Date: April 18, 1966
- Site: Santa Monica Civic Auditorium in Santa Monica, California
- Hosted by: Bob Hope
- Produced by: Joe Pasternak
- Directed by: Richard Dunlap

Highlights
- Best Picture: The Sound of Music
- Most awards: Doctor Zhivago and The Sound of Music (5)
- Most nominations: Doctor Zhivago and The Sound of Music (10)

TV in the United States
- Network: ABC

The 38th Academy Awards, honoring the best in film for 1965, were held on April 18, 1966, at the Santa Monica Civic Auditorium in Santa Monica, California. They were hosted by Bob Hope, and were the first Oscars to be broadcast live in color. Lynda Bird Johnson, daughter of President Lyndon B. Johnson, attended the ceremony, escorted by actor George Hamilton.

The most successful films of the year were The Sound of Music and Doctor Zhivago, each with ten nominations and five wins, with the former winning Best Picture. Both films are in the top 10 inflation-adjusted commercially successful films ever made, and both would go on to appear on the American Film Institute list of the greatest American films of the twentieth century.

The Sound of Music was the first Best Picture winner without a screenwriting nomination since Hamlet, and would be the last until Titanic at the 70th Academy Awards. Othello became the third film (of four to date) to receive four acting nominations without one for Best Picture. William Wyler received the last of his record twelve Best Director nominations for The Collector.

== Awards ==
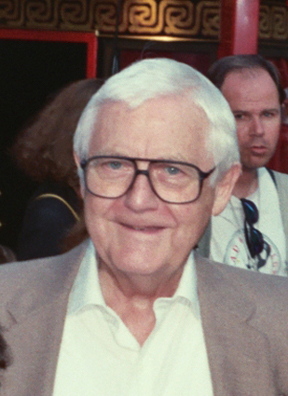
Robert Wise, Best Picture and Best Director winner

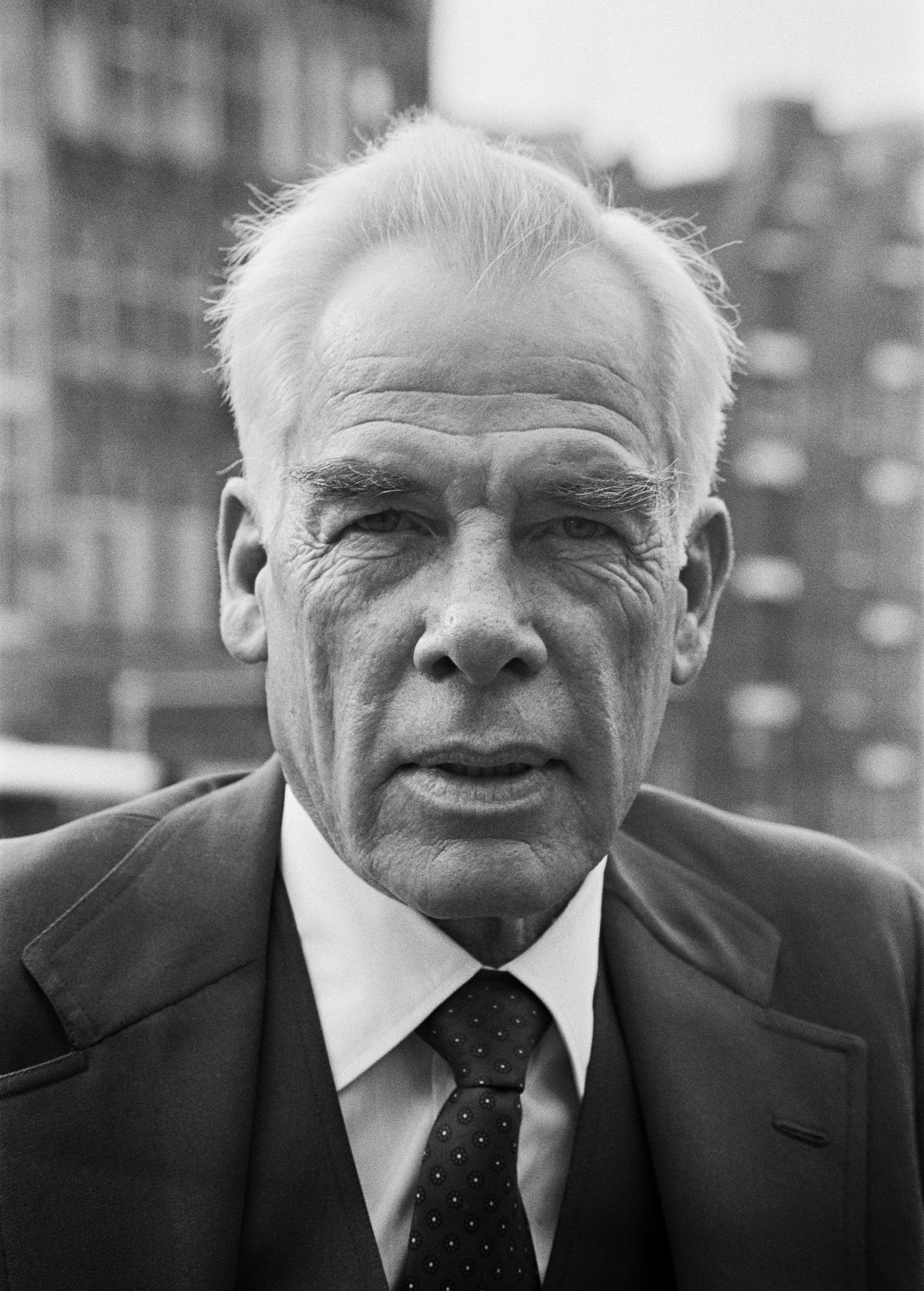
Lee Marvin, Best Actor winner

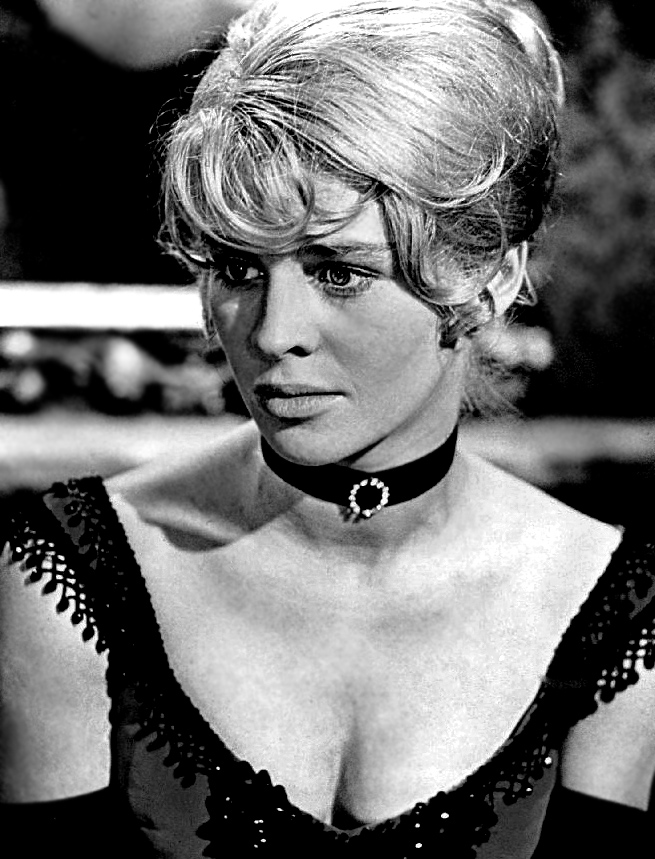
Julie Christie, Best Actress winner

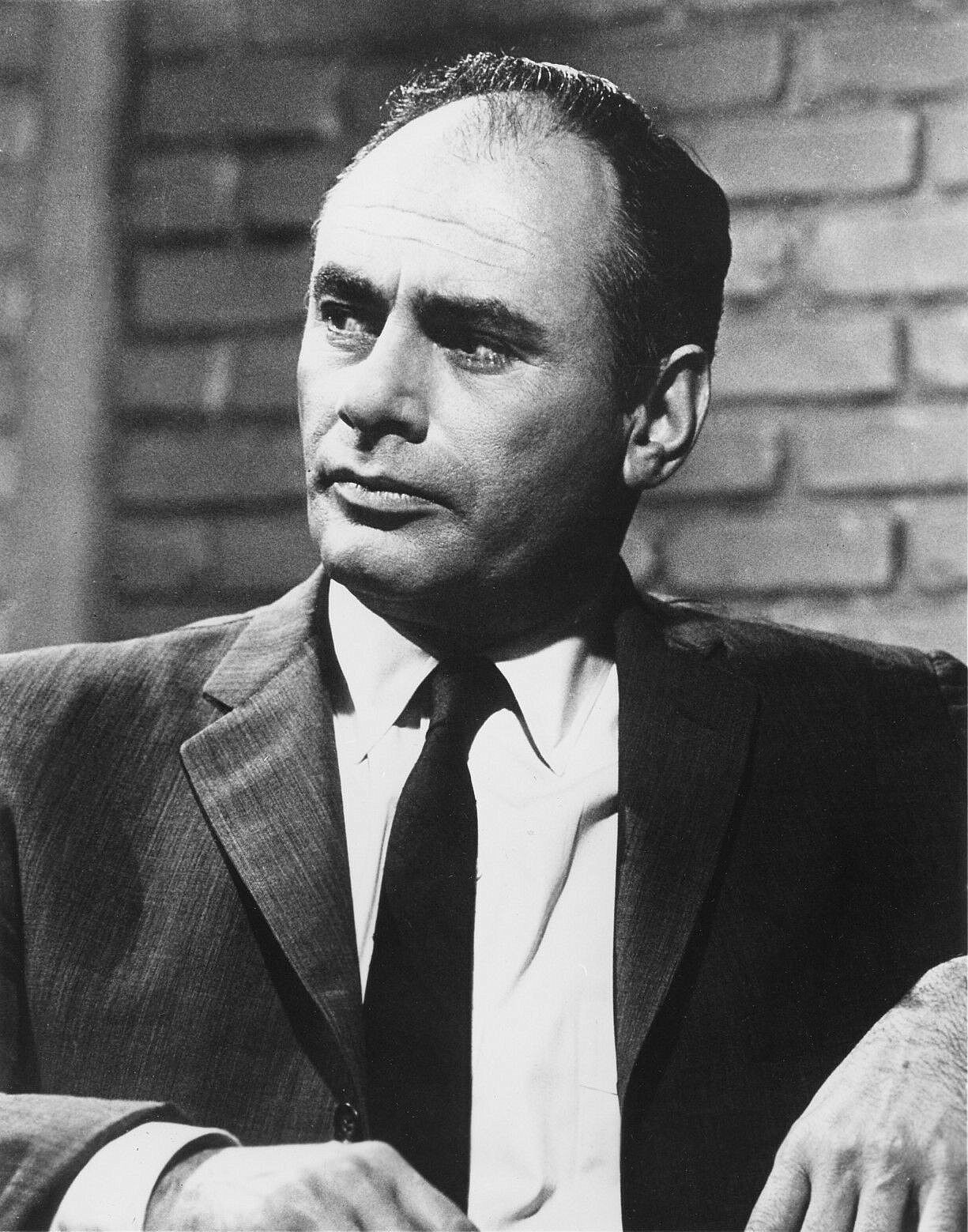
Martin Balsam, Best Supporting Actor winner

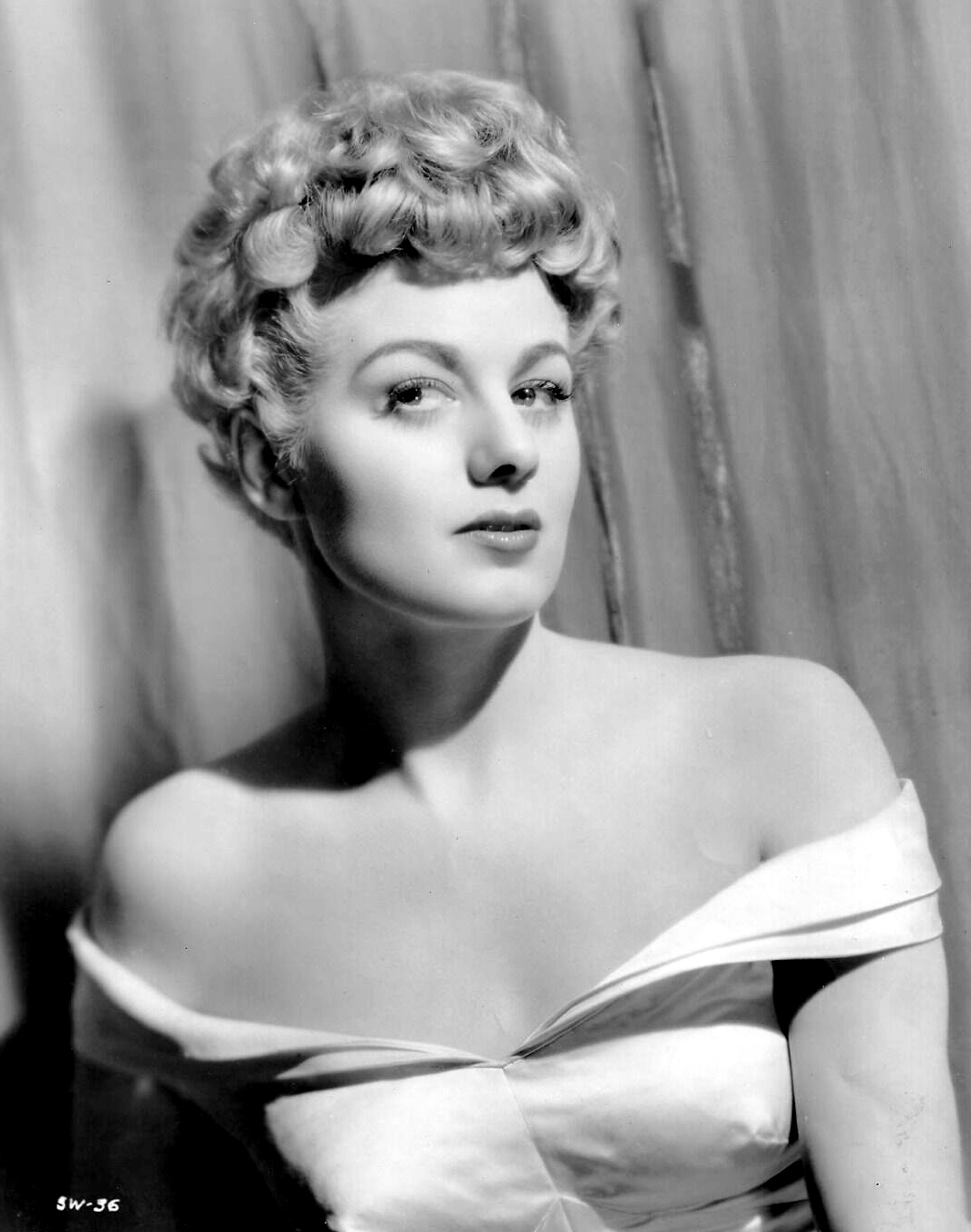
Shelley Winters, Best Supporting Actress winner

Nominees were announced on February 21, 1966. Winners are listed first and highlighted in boldface.

**Best Picture**: **The Sound of Music – Robert Wise, producer**; Darling – Joseph Janni, producer; Doctor Zhivago – Carlo Ponti, producer; Ship of Fools – Stanley Kramer, producer; A Thousand Clowns – Fred Coe, producer	**Best Directing**: **Robert Wise – The Sound of Music**; William Wyler – The Collector; John Schlesinger – Darling; David Lean – Doctor Zhivago; Hiroshi Teshigahara – Woman in the Dunes
**Best Actor**: **Lee Marvin – Cat Ballou as Kid Shelleen / Tim Strawn**; Richard Burton – The Spy Who Came In from the Cold as Alec Leamas; Laurence Olivier – Othello as Othello; Rod Steiger – The Pawnbroker as Sol Nazerman; Oskar Werner – Ship of Fools as Dr. Wilhelm "Willi" Schumann	**Best Actress**: **Julie Christie – Darling as Diana Scott**; Julie Andrews – The Sound of Music as Maria von Trapp; Samantha Eggar – The Collector as Miranda Grey; Elizabeth Hartman – A Patch of Blue as Selina D'Arcey; Simone Signoret – Ship of Fools as La Condesa
**Best Actor in a Supporting Role**: **Martin Balsam – A Thousand Clowns as Arnold Burns**; Ian Bannen – The Flight of the Phoenix as "Ratbags" Crow; Tom Courtenay – Doctor Zhivago as Pavel "Pasha" Antipov; Michael Dunn – Ship of Fools as Carl Glocken; Frank Finlay – Othello as Iago	**Best Actress in a Supporting Role**: **Shelley Winters – A Patch of Blue as Rose-Ann D'Arcey**; Ruth Gordon – Inside Daisy Clover as Lucile Clover; Joyce Redman – Othello as Emilia; Maggie Smith – Othello as Desdemona; Peggy Wood – The Sound of Music as the Mother Abbess
**Best Writing (Story and Screenplay -- Written Directly for the Screen)**: **Darling – Frederic Raphael**; Casanova 70 – Agenore Incrocci, Furio Scarpelli, Mario Monicelli, Tonino Guerra, Giorgio Salvioni and Suso Cecchi d'Amico; Those Magnificent Men in their Flying Machines – Jack Davies and Ken Annakin; The Train – Franklin Coen and Frank Davis; The Umbrellas of Cherbourg – Jacques Demy	**Best Writing (Screenplay -- Based on Material from Another Medium)**: **Doctor Zhivago – Robert Bolt from Doctor Zhivago by Boris Pasternak**; Cat Ballou – Walter Newman and Frank Pierson from The Ballad of Cat Ballou by Roy Chanslor; The Collector – Stanley Mann and John Kohn from The Collector by John Fowles; Ship of Fools – Abby Mann from Ship of Fools by Katherine Anne Porter; A Thousand Clowns – Herb Gardner from A Thousand Clowns by Herb Gardner
**Best Foreign Language Film**: **The Shop on Main Street (Czechoslovakia)**; Blood on the Land (Greece); Dear John (Sweden); Kwaidan (Japan); Marriage Italian Style (Italy)	**Best Documentary (Feature)**: **The Eleanor Roosevelt Story – Sidney Glazier**; The Battle of the Bulge... The Brave Rifles – Laurence E. Mascott; The Forth Road Bridge – Peter Mills; Let My People Go: The Story of Israel – Marshall Flaum; To Die in Madrid – Frédéric Rossif
**Best Documentary (Short Subject)**: **To Be Alive! – Francis Thompson**; Mural on Our Street – Kirk Smallman; Nyitany – Mafilm Productions; Point of View – Vision Associates Productions; Yeats Country – Patrick Carey and Joe Mendoza	**Best Short Subject (Live Action)**: **The Chicken – Claude Berri**; Fortress of Peace – Lothar Wolff; Skaterdater – Marshall Backlar and Noel Black; Snow – Edgar Anstey; Time Piece – Jim Henson
**Best Short Subject (Cartoon)**: **The Dot and the Line – Chuck Jones and Les Goldman**; Clay or the Origin of Species – Eliot Noyes Jr.; The Thieving Magpie – Emanuele Luzzati	**Best Music (Music Score -- Substantially Original)**: **Doctor Zhivago – Maurice Jarre**; The Agony and the Ecstasy – Alex North; The Greatest Story Ever Told – Alfred Newman; A Patch of Blue – Jerry Goldsmith; The Umbrellas of Cherbourg – Michel Legrand and Jacques Demy
**Best Music (Scoring of Music -- Adaptation or Treatment)**: **The Sound of Music – Irwin Kostal**; Cat Ballou – Frank De Vol; The Pleasure Seekers – Lionel Newman and Alexander Courage; A Thousand Clowns – Don Walker; The Umbrellas of Cherbourg – Michel Legrand	**Best Music (Song)**: **"The Shadow of Your Smile" from The Sandpiper – Music by Johnny Mandel; Lyrics by Paul Francis Webster**; "The Ballad of Cat Ballou" from Cat Ballou – Music by Jerry Livingston; Lyrics by Mack David; "I Will Wait for You" from The Umbrellas of Cherbourg – Music by Michel Legrand; Lyrics by Jacques Demy; "The Sweetheart Tree" from The Great Race – Music by Henry Mancini; Lyrics by Johnny Mercer; "What's New Pussycat?" from What's New Pussycat? – Music by Burt Bacharach; Lyrics by Hal David
**Best Sound**: **The Sound of Music – James Corcoran and Fred Hynes**; The Agony and the Ecstasy – James Corcoran; Doctor Zhivago – A. W. Watkins and Franklin Milton; The Great Race – George Groves; Shenandoah – Waldon O. Watson	**Best Sound Effects**: **The Great Race – Treg Brown**; Von Ryan's Express – Walter Rossi
**Best Art Direction (Black-and-White)**: **Ship of Fools – Art Direction: Robert Clatworthy; Set Decoration: Joseph Kish**; King Rat – Art Direction: Robert Emmet Smith; Set Decoration: Frank Tuttle; A Patch of Blue – Art Direction: George Davis and Urie McCleary; Set Decoration: Henry Grace and Charles S. Thompson; The Slender Thread – Art Direction: Hal Pereira and Jack Poplin; Set Decoration: Robert R. Benton and Joseph Kish; The Spy Who Came In from the Cold – Art Direction: Hal Pereira, Tambi Larsen and Ted Marshall; Set Decoration: Josie MacAvin	**Best Art Direction (Color)**: **Doctor Zhivago – Art Direction: John Box and Terence Marsh; Set Decoration: Dario Simoni**; The Agony and the Ecstasy – Art Direction: John DeCuir and Jack Martin Smith; Set Decoration: Dario Simoni; The Greatest Story Ever Told – Art Direction: Richard Day, William J. Creber and David S. Hall (posthumous nomination); Set Decoration: Ray Moyer, Fred M. MacLean and Norman Rockett; Inside Daisy Clover – Art Direction: Robert Clatworthy; Set Decoration: George James Hopkins; The Sound of Music – Art Direction: Boris Leven; Set Decoration: Walter M. Scott and Ruby Levitt
**Best Cinematography (Black-and-White)**: **Ship of Fools – Ernest Laszlo**; In Harm's Way – Loyal Griggs; King Rat – Burnett Guffey; Morituri – Conrad Hall; A Patch of Blue – Robert Burks	**Best Cinematography (Color)**: **Doctor Zhivago – Freddie Young**; The Agony and the Ecstasy – Leon Shamroy; The Great Race – Russell Harlan; The Greatest Story Ever Told – William C. Mellor (posthumous nomination) and Loyal Griggs; The Sound of Music – Ted D. McCord
**Best Costume Design (Black-and-White)**: **Darling – Julie Harris**; Morituri – Moss Mabry; A Rage to Live – Howard Shoup; Ship of Fools – Jean Louis and Bill Thomas; The Slender Thread – Edith Head	**Best Costume Design (Color)**: **Doctor Zhivago – Phyllis Dalton**; The Agony and the Ecstasy – Vittorio Nino Novarese; The Greatest Story Ever Told – Marjorie Best and Vittorio Nino Novarese; Inside Daisy Clover – Edith Head and Bill Thomas; The Sound of Music – Dorothy Jeakins
**Best Film Editing**: **The Sound of Music – William H. Reynolds**; Cat Ballou – Charles Nelson; Doctor Zhivago – Norman Savage; The Flight of the Phoenix – Michael Luciano; The Great Race – Ralph E. Winters	**Best Special Visual Effects**: **Thunderball – John Stears**; The Greatest Story Ever Told – J. McMillan Johnson

=== Honorary Award ===
- To Bob Hope for unique and distinguished service to our industry and the academy.

=== Jean Hersholt Humanitarian Award ===
- Edmond L. DePatie

=== Irving G. Thalberg Memorial Award ===
- William Wyler

== Multiple nominations and awards ==
These films had multiple nominations:

- 10 nominations: Doctor Zhivago and The Sound of Music
- 8 nominations: Ship of Fools
- 5 nominations: The Agony and the Ecstasy, Cat Ballou, Darling, The Great Race, The Greatest Story Ever Told and A Patch of Blue
- 4 nominations: Othello, A Thousand Clowns and The Umbrellas of Cherbourg
- 3 nominations: The Collector and Inside Daisy Clover
- 2 nominations: The Flight of the Phoenix, King Rat, Morituri, The Slender Thread and The Spy Who Came In from the Cold

The following films received multiple awards.

- 5 wins: Doctor Zhivago and The Sound of Music
- 3 wins: Darling
- 2 wins: Ship of Fools

== Presenters and performers ==
The following individuals, listed in order of appearance, presented awards or performed musical numbers.

=== Presenters ===
Name	Role
Hank Simms	Announcer for the 38th Academy Awards
Arthur Freed (AMPAS President)	Gave opening remarks welcoming guests to the awards ceremony
Patty Duke; George Hamilton	Presenters of the award for Best Sound
Dorothy Malone	Presenter of the award for Best Special Visual Effects
Lila Kedrova	Presenter of the award for Best Supporting Actor
Yvette Mimieux	Presenter of the award for Best Sound Effects
Lana Turner; James Garner	Presenters of the Costume Design Awards
Milton Berle; Phyllis Diller	Presenters of the Documentary Awards
Don Knotts; Elke Sommer	Presenters of the Short Subjects Awards
Peter Ustinov	Presenter of the award for Best Supporting Actress
Jason Robards	Presenter of the award for Best Film Editing
Warren Beatty; Debbie Reynolds	Presenters of the awards for Best Art Direction
Angie Dickinson	Presenter of the Jean Hersholt Humanitarian Award to Edmond L. DePatie
Richard Johnson; Kim Novak	Presenters of the awards for Best Cinematography
James Coburn; Virna Lisi	Presenters of the Music Awards
Gregory Peck	Presenter of the award for Best Foreign Language Film
Natalie Wood	Presenter of the award for Best Song
Shirley MacLaine	Presenter of the award for Best Director
George Peppard; Joanne Woodward	Presenters of the Writing Awards
Arthur Freed	Presenter of the Irving J. Thalberg Memorial Award to William Wyler
Julie Andrews	Presenter of the award for Best Actor
Rex Harrison	Presenter of the award for Best Actress
Arthur Freed	Presenter of the Honorary Gold Medal to Bob Hope
Jack Lemmon	Presenter of the award for Best Picture

=== Performers ===
Name	Role	Performed
Johnny Green	Musical arranger and conductor	Orchestral
Academy Awards Chorus	Performers	“The Academy Awards Song (Mr. Oscar)” during the opening presentation
The Smothers Brothers	Performers	"The Ballad of Cat Ballou" from Cat Ballou
Michel Legrand; Jane Morgan	Performers	"I Will Wait for You" from The Umbrellas of Cherbourg
Barbara McNair	Performer	"The Shadow of Your Smile" from The Sandpiper
Robert Goulet	Performer	"The Sweetheart Tree" from The Great Race
Liza Minnelli	Performer	"What's New Pussycat?" from What's New Pussycat?

== See also ==
- 23rd Golden Globe Awards
- 1965 in film
- 8th Grammy Awards
- 17th Primetime Emmy Awards
- 18th Primetime Emmy Awards
- 19th British Academy Film Awards
- 20th Tony Awards
- List of submissions to the 38th Academy Awards for Best Foreign Language Film
