= 1966 Academy Awards =

1966 Academy Awards may refer to:

- 38th Academy Awards, the Academy Awards ceremony that took place in 1966
- 39th Academy Awards, the 1967 ceremony honoring the best in film for 1966
