= 1965 Academy Awards =

1965 Academy Awards may refer to:

- 37th Academy Awards, the 1965 ceremony honoring the best in film for 1964
- 38th Academy Awards, the 1966 ceremony honoring the best in film for 1965
