= List of Odia films of 1988 =

This is a list of films produced by the Ollywood film industry based in Bhubaneshwar and Cuttack in 1988:

== A-Z ==
| Title | Director | Cast | Genre | Notes |
|---|---|---|---|---|
1988
| Bada Bhauja | Rajani Kanta | Bijay Mohanty, Uttam Mohanty, Sri Ram Panda, Kalyani Mandal, Baishali, Jayee, Debu brahma, Debu Bose, Asit Pati, Baby Artist-Soni | | |
| Bahu Heba Emiti | Bijaya Bhaskar | | | |
| Jahaku Rakhibe Ananta | Ashim Kumar | Uttam Mohanty, Kanta Singh | | |
| Kanyadaan | Arun Mohanty | | | |
| Kichi Smruti Kichi Anubhuti | Man Mohan Mahapatra | | | |
| Kurukshetra | Shriram Panda | Shriram Panda, Tripura Misra, Ashru Mochon Mohanty | | |
| Lal Pana Bibi | Prashanta Nanda | Prashanta Nanda, Mahasweta Roy | | |
| Nishitha Swapna | Man Mohan Mahapatra | | | |
| Papa Punya | Sidhartha | | | |
| Pua Moro Kala Thakura | RAju Misra | Uttam Mohanty, Aparajita Mohanty | | |
| Suna Chadhei | Rabi Kinnagi | Uttam Mohanty, Archana Jogelkar | | |
| Thili Jhia Heli Bahu | Bijay Bhaskar | Uttam Mohanty, Aparajita Mohanty | | |
