= Charles Bateman (actor) =

American actor (1930–2024)

- Born: November 19, 1930; San Diego, California, U.S.
- Died: April 20, 2024 (aged 93); La Mesa, California, U.S.
- Education: San Diego Junior College
- Occupation: Actor
- Years active: 1958–1991

Charles Wilbur Bateman (November 19, 1930 – April 20, 2024) was an American actor. He appeared in 76 different television programs between 1958 and 1991, as well as numerous theatrically-released and made-for-telelevision films. He is perhaps best recognized to audiences for his role as the ill-fated First Officer Larsen in the 1972 box-office smash and cinematic classic The Poseidon Adventure.

== Early years ==
Bateman was born on November 19, 1930, in San Diego, California. His early training in acting came at San Diego Junior College and La Jolla Playhouse as well as in a stock theater company. He was one of three children born to Thomas O. Bateman and Ivarene Cornelius Bateman. His mother Ivarene died aged 110.

== Career ==
Bateman also guest starred as a young engineer in the episode "The Tree" of CBS's Lassie, as well as two episodes of Perry Mason: Roy Dowson in "The Case of the Bashful Burro" in 1960, and defendant and title character Jeff Bronson in the 1961 episode, "The Case of the Guilty Clients." He co-starred in the first season of the syndicated cop show Manhunt in 1959, then left in 1969 to star, in two roles, in 39 episodes of the only season of Two Faces West . He might best be remembered for his role as Fred Williams in the 5th and final season of Hazel.

Bateman's first venture into soap operas was in 1980, when he joined the cast of NBC's Days of Our Lives as Maxwell Jarvis, but he left the program after a year. He was later the third actor to portray C.C.Capwell on the soap opera Santa Barbara. His last acting role was in 1991 in an episode of The Trials of Rosie O'Neill.

== Death ==
Bateman died in La Mesa, California on April 20, 2024, at the age of 93.
