= Manhunt (1959 TV series) =

1959 American syndicated television crime drama

- Genre: Crime drama
- Starring: Victor Jory; Patrick McVey
- Theme music composer: Joseph Weiss
- Country of origin: United States
- No. of seasons: 2
- No. of episodes: 78

Production
- Producer: Robert Sparks
- Running time: 30 min.
- Production company: Screen Gems

Manhunt is an American syndicated half-hour television crime drama starring Victor Jory as a San Diego police detective Lt. Howard Finucane, Charles Bateman as his partner Det. George Peters (in the first 13 episodes), and Patrick McVey as police beat newspaper reporter Ben Andrews, who also narrated the episodes. Seventy-eight episodes were broadcast between April 15, 1959, and 1961.

Filmed on location in San Diego, the series regularly showcased local sites such as the Pacific Highway district, police headquarters, the San Diego Zoo, the Star of India, San Diego Bay, the Bali Hai Restaurant and the Hotel Del Coronado. A panorama of the cityscape was featured during the closing credits.

The character Ben Andrews was based on the San Diego Union police beat reporter Pliny Castanien.

== Cast ==
- Victor Jory as Det. Lieutenant Howard Finucane
- Patrick McVey as Ben Andrews
- Charles Bateman as Det. George Peters (episodes 1–13)
- Rian Garrick as Det. Bruce Hanna (episodes 14–23)
- Chuck Henderson as Det. Dan Kramer (episodes 24–39)
- Michael Stefani as Det. Paul Kirk (episodes 40–52)
- Robert L. Crawford, Sr., as Det. Phil Burns (episodes 53–65) (Note: Crawford was the father of actors Robert L. Crawford, Jr., and Johnny Crawford.)
- Todd Armstrong as Det. Carl Spencer (episodes 66–78)

Producer Robert Sparks said that actors who portrayed rookie policemen on the series were "taking on-the-air auditions" with the role increasing from one week to the next. Sparks said, "Everything from his attitude on the set to the nature of his fan mail is carefully checked."

== Episodes ==
=== Season 1 (1959–60) ===
No. overall	No. in season	Title	Directed by	Written by	Original release date
1	1	"Killer in Blue"	George Sherman	John Hawkins	1959
2	2	"Fishing Expedition"	Fred Jackman	Berni Gould	1959
3	3	"Three Boys and a Girl"	TBD	TBD	1959
4	4	"The Rug Man"	TBD	TBD	1959
5	5	"A Decent Burial"	TBD	TBD	1959
6	6	"The Visitor"	TBD	TBD	1959
7	7	"The Gun Smugglers"	TBD	TBD	1959
8	8	"Hold Up"	Fred Jackman	Jack Jacobs	1959
9	9	"Man in the Panama Hat"	Fred Jackman	Bernard C. Schoenfeld	1959
10	10	"Pacification of Ghent"	TBD	TBD	1959
11	11	"The Yellow Dog"	Fred Jackman	Steve McNeil	1959
12	12	"The Lost"	TBD	TBD	1959
13	13	"Hair Trigger"	TBD	TBD	1959
14	14	"Traffic Ticket"	TBD	TBD	1959
15	15	"The Fire Bombers"	TBD	TBD	1959
16	16	"Just a Few Thousand"	Fred Jackman	Rudy Makoul and Joel Rogosin	1959
17	17	"Killer Car"	TBD	TBD	1960
18	18	"The Quarrel"	TBD	TBD	1960
19	19	"Bird of Death"	TBD	TBD	1960
20	20	"Misguided Mother"	TBD	TBD	1960
21	21	"The Reward"	Fred Jackman	Seymour Friedman	1960
22	22	"The Hearing Aid"	TBD	TBD	1960
23	23	"Run, Thief, Run"	TBD	TBD	1960
24	24	"Target Practice"	TBD	TBD	1960
25	25	"The Man with the Pouch"	TBD	TBD	1960
26	26	"The Luau"	Fred Jackman	Teleplay by Al Martin and Ward Hawkins, Story by Al Martin	1960
27	27	"Passport to Death"	TBD	TBD	1960
28	28	"The Ice Caper"	TBD	TBD	1960
29	29	"The Seeing Eye Dog Caper"	TBD	TBD	1960
30	30	"The Payoff Man"	TBD	TBD	1960
31	31	"Double Identity"	TBD	TBD	1960
32	32	"The Man with the Matchbook Cover"	TBD	TBD	1960
33	33	"Matinee Mobster"	Fred Jackman Jr.	Story by : Bernard C. Schoenfeld; Teleplay by : Bernard C. Schoenfeld & Steve McNeil	April 25, 1960
34	34	"A Rose for Willie"	TBD	TBD	1960
35	35	"Charter Flight"	Fred Jackman	Teleplay by Robert Bloomfield and Steve McNeil, Story by Robert Bloomfield	1960
36	36	"A Medal for Mrs. Carrington"	TBD	TBD	1960
37	37	"The Day the Roof Fell In"	TBD	TBD	1960
38	38	"Dum Dum Mother"	TBD	TBD	1960
39	39	"Delayed Action"	TBD	TBD	1960

=== Season 2 (1960–61) ===
No. overall	No. in season	Title	Directed by	Written by	Original release date
40	1	"Ben's Vacation"	TBD	TBD	1960
41	2	"The Gopher"	TBD	TBD	1960
42	3	"One for the Show"	TBD	TBD	1960
43	4	"Queen's Ransom"	Fred Jackman	Margaret & Paul Schneider	1960
44	5	"Finucane's Killer"	Fred Jackman	Margaret & Paul Schneider	1960
45	6	"The Model"	TBD	TBD	1960
46	7	"The Knife"	TBD	TBD	1960
47	8	"Death of a Quiet Man"	TBD	TBD	1960
48	9	"1364 Gately Road"	TBD	TBD	1960
49	10	"Number Five Iron"	Fred Jackman	Jack Jacobs	1960
50	11	"The 27th Year"	TBD	TBD	1960
51	12	"Tenpins"	TBD	TBD	1960
52	13	"Honey Baby"	TBD	TBD	1960
53	14	"The Set-Up"	TBD	TBD	1960
54	15	"The Check Passer"	Fred Jackman	Tony Lawrence	1960
55	16	"The Executioner"	Fred Jackman	Victor Jory	1960
56	17	"The Long Shot"	TBD	TBD	1960
57	18	"The Firebug"	TBD	TBD	1960
58	19	"The Rabies Story"	TBD	TBD	1960
59	20	"Witness in Danger"	TBD	TBD	1961
60	21	"The Walking Engines"	TBD	TBD	1961
61	22	"The Masterpiece"	TBD	TBD	1961
62	23	"A Homer for Thanksgiving"	TBD	TBD	1961
63	24	"Kidnapped"	Fred Jackman	John Hawkins	1961
64	25	"The Accidental Truth"	TBD	TBD	1961
65	26	"The Dead Antelope/Gazelle"	Fred Jackman	Margaret & Paul Schneider	1961
66	27	"A Call from Phoenix"	TBD	TBD	1961
67	28	"Act of Duty"	TBD	TBD	1961
68	29	"The Black Widow"	TBD	TBD	1961
69	30	"War Against San Diego"	Fred Jackman	Margaret & Paul Schneider	1961
70	31	"Wooden Witness"	TBD	TBD	1961
71	32	"Buried Novel"	TBD	TBD	1961
72	33	"Case Without Clues"	Fred Jackman	John Hawkins	1961
73	34	"Woman on the Highway"	TBD	TBD	1961
74	35	"Eency Weency Spider"	Fred Jackman	Teleplay by Charles B. Smith, Story by Rudy Makoul	1961
75	36	"The Guest of Honor"	TBD	TBD	1961
76	37	"The Death Trap"	TBD	TBD	1961
77	38	"The Professor"	TBD	TBD	1961
78	39	"The Long Shadow"	TBD	TBD	1961

== Recognition ==
In 1960 the National Conference of Police Commissioners recognized the program for depicting "an accurate and realistic picture of the modern police officer".
