= A Time for Killing =

1967 film by Roger Corman, Phil Karlson

- Theatrical release poster
- Directed by: Phil Karlson
- Screenplay by: Halsted Welles
- Based on: The Southern Blade by Nelson Wolford; Shirley Wolford
- Produced by: Harry Joe Brown
- Starring: Glenn Ford; George Hamilton; Inger Stevens; Paul Petersen
- Cinematography: Kenneth Peach
- Edited by: Roy V. Livingston
- Music by: Mundell Lowe
- Production company: Sage Western Pictures Inc.
- Distributed by: Columbia Pictures
- Release date: November 1, 1967
- Running time: 88 minutes
- Country: United States
- Language: English
- Budget: $2 million or over $500,000

A Time for Killing is a 1967 adventure war and Western film directed originally by Roger Corman but finished by Phil Karlson. Filmed in Panavision and Pathécolor, it stars Glenn Ford, George Hamilton, Inger Stevens, and Paul Petersen. Todd Armstrong and Max Baer Jr., have feature roles, and Harrison Ford made his credited screen debut.

It was also known as The Long Ride Home.

== Plot ==
During the Civil War, Confederate soldiers escape from a Union prison and head for the Mexican border. Along the way, they kill a Union courier bearing the news that the war is over. Keeping the message a secret, the captain has his men go on and they soon find themselves in a battle with the Union search party who also is unaware of the war's end.

== Cast ==
- Glenn Ford as Maj. Tom Wolcott
- George Hamilton as Capt. Dorrit Bentley
- Inger Stevens as Emily Biddle
- Paul Petersen as Blue Lake
- Timothy Carey as Billy Cat
- Kenneth Tobey as Sgt. Cleehan
- Richard X. Slattery as Cpl. Paddy Darling
- Harrison J. Ford as Lt. Shaffer
- Kay E. Kuter as Owelson
- Dick Miller as Zollicoffer
- Emile Meyer as Col. Harries
- Marshall Reed as Stedner
- Max Baer Jr. as Sgt. Luther Liskell
- Todd Armstrong as Lt. 'Pru' Prudessing
- Harry Dean Stanton as Sgt. Dan Way

== Production ==
=== Development ===
The film was based on a 1961 novel The Southern Blade. The Los Angeles Times called it "fast moving" The New York Times said it was full of "military stereotypes" but that it was written with "professional skill."

In October 1964 the screen rights to the novel were purchased by producer Harry Joe Brown. He set up the project at Columbia Studios, where he joined forces with Roger Corman.

=== Pre-production ===
By the end of 1964, Roger Corman was one of the most successful low-budget filmmakers in Hollywood, mostly working for American International Pictures. "Everything had been interesting, artistically satisfying, economically satisfying", Corman said eighteen months later. "But I decided I was going nowhere and wanted to move directly into the business." So he accepted a contract with Columbia.

Corman had a deal to make three films with Columbia. "But every idea I submitted was too strange, too weird", he later said. "Every idea they had seemed too ordinary to me. Ordinary pictures don't make money today [in 1966] because audiences today are too intelligent... It's a young people's audience... They can see the average for free on TV. You've got to give them something a little more complex artistically and intellectually. To show something you can't see on TV leads inevitably to unusual material."

Corman says the ideas he submitted to Columbia were a biopic of Baron von Richthofen, a story of the St Valentine's Day Massacre and an adaptation of Only Lovers Left Alive. (He would end up making the first two films for other studios).

Eventually he agreed on three films. The first was The Southern Blade, which he was to produce along with Harry Joe Brown. The others were Iwo Jima (about the Battle of Iwo Jima) and Robert E. Lee, a biopic of the famous general. (Later Robert E. Lee would go to United Artists and the proposed third Columbia film would be a war film, The Day They Let the Prisoners Out, by Peter Bogdanovich.)

In June 1965 the title of The Southern Blade was change to The Long Way Home. Filming was meant to start in September 1965.

However, Columbia and Corman clashed and Corman wound up returning to AIP where he directed the hugely successful The Wild Angels. "The main difference between the minors and the majors is the amount of freedom allowed", Corman said. He and the studio came to terms once they agreed to give him a free hand with the script.

Corman had the script rewritten by Robert Towne with whom he had collaborated a number of times, most recently on The Tomb of Ligeia (1965).

=== Casting ===
In April 1966 Glenn Ford signed to star. It was the 100th film that Ford starred in. The following month Cliff Robertson signed to co star. Eventually Robertson dropped out and was replaced by George Hamilton whose fee was a reported $100,000. Inger Stevens and Max Baer Jr also joined the cast.

Warren Beatty had been offered the lead role but turned it down. However he was impressed by Towne's writing, and later hired the writer to do uncredited work on the script for Bonnie and Clyde, which led to a long collaboration between the men.

The film was Harrison Ford's first film with a credited role; despite not having a middle name, he was billed as "Harrison J. Ford" (where the "J" did not stand for anything) to avoid confusion with the silent film actor Harrison Ford.

=== Principal photography ===
Filming started in June 1966 in Kanab, Utah. A mountain peak near Kanab was named after Glenn Ford. Members of the Ute tribe served as extras for the film.

By the end of the month, Corman had left the project and been replaced by Phil Karlson. Columbia gave no reason for this decision. Once Corman left, his editor Monte Hellman also left the project.

Richard Devon, an actor who had worked with Corman, later argued the problem on the film was that Corman could not reconcile his low budget ways to work for a major studio.

He was given a fine budget and stars and everything else. But he started shooting the film and he just couldn't get out of his old ways. He was pushing the footage, he was pushing the actors, the crew was upset, everybody was upset, etc. The Columbia brass looked at the rushes and called him in and said: 'You know. Roger, we want something to be on the film, We don't need this fast kind of attitude that you've had in the past. There's a talent there, there's an ability. Stretch it out." But he couldn't hack it. And he got replaced on the film.

Parts of the film were shot in Zion, Glen Canyon, Kanab movie fort, Paria, and the Coral Pink Sand Dunes in Utah. Filming also took place in Old Tucson, Arizona.

== Reception ==
According to Filmink, after being fired from the film "Corman rarely went near Westerns again. While you can blame this on the general decline in popularity of the genre, there were still a few being made... I wonder if Corman's Time for Killing experience made him particularly anti-Western."

Another article in the same magazine argued that the experience may have influenced Columbia into being more "hands off" when dealing with the independent production company, BBS Productions, "and were rewarded by the huge success of Easy Rider, Five Easy Pieces and The Last Picture Show (all made by alumni from the school of Roger Corman)."

== Soundtrack ==
The original score of the film was composed by Van Alexander who was given seven weeks to compose 45 minutes of music for the film. He collaborated with Ned Washington for a title song by Eddy Arnold. Though producers Harry Joe Brown, Jonie Taps and Columbia's Mike Frankovich were enthusiastic about Alexander's score, once the film was met with a disastrous reception at a preview it was decided to restore the film with a guitar score by Mundell Lowe.

== See also ==
- List of American films of 1967
