= List of Indian films of 1988 =

Provided below is the list of Indian films released on 1988.

== Box office collection ==
The list of highest-grossing Indian films released in 1988, by worldwide box office gross revenue, are as follows:

*	Denotes films still running in cinemas worldwide

Highest worldwide gross of 2023.
Rank	Title	Director	Language	Worldwide gross	Ref
1	Tezaab	N. Chandra	Hindi	₹16 crore (US$1.7 million)	
2	Shahenshah	Tinnu Anand	Hindi	₹12 crore (US$1.3 million)	
3	Paap Ki Duniya	Shibu Mitra	Hindi	₹9.50 crore (US$1.0 million)	
4	Sathyaa	Suresh Krissna	Tamil	₹8 crore (US$850,000)	
5	Khoon Bhari Maang	Rakesh Roshan	Hindi	₹6 crore (US$630,000)	
6	Qayamat Se Qayamat Tak	Mansoor Khan	Hindi	₹5 crore (US$530,000)	
7	Yamudiki Mogudu	Ravi Raja Pinisetty	Telugu	₹5 crore (US$530,000)	
8	Dayavan	Feroz Khan	Hindi	₹4.80 crore (US$510,000)	
9	Yateem	J. P. Dutta	Hindi	₹3.10 crore (US$330,000)	
10	Ashi Hi Banwa Banwi	Sachin Pilgaonkar	Marathi	₹3 crore (US$320,000)	

== Lists of Indian films of 1988 ==
- List of Bengali films of 1988
- List of Gujarati films of 1988
- List of Hindi films of 1988
- List of Kannada films of 1988
- List of Malayalam films of 1988
- List of Marathi films of 1988
- List of Odia films of 1988
- List of Punjabi films of 1988
- List of Tamil films of 1988
- List of Telugu films of 1988

== Notes ==
Preceded by 1987	Indian films 1988	Succeeded by 1989
