= Robert R. Benton =

American set decorator

- Born: April 10, 1924; Los Angeles, California, U.S.
- Died: December 7, 2003 (aged 79); Santa Barbara, California, U.S.
- Occupation: Set decorator
- Years active: 1956–1995

Robert R. Benton (April 10, 1924 – December 7, 2003) was an American set decorator. He was nominated for four Academy Awards in the category Best Art Direction.

== Selected filmography ==
Benton was nominated for four Academy Awards for Best Art Direction:

- The Oscar (1966; co-nominated with Hal Pereira, Arthur Lonergan and James W. Payne)
- The Slender Thread (1965; co-nominated with Hal Pereira, Jack Poplin and Joseph Kish)
- The Americanization of Emily (1964; co-nominated with George Davis, Hans Peter, Elliot Scott and Henry Grace)
- Hud (1963; co-nominated with Hal Pereira, Tambi Larsen and Samuel M. Comer)
