= Todd Armstrong =

American actor (1937–1992)

- In Jason and the Argonauts, 1963
- Born: John Harris Armstrong; July 25, 1937; St. Louis, Missouri, U.S.
- Died: November 17, 1992 (aged 55); Butte, California, U.S.
- Cause of death: Suicide by gunshot
- Occupation: Actor
- Years active: 1961–1983
- Known for: Jason and the Argonauts

Todd Armstrong (born John Harris Armstrong; July 25, 1937 – November 17, 1992) was an American actor who appeared in ten films and several television series. He is best known for playing the title role in the cult classic Jason and the Argonauts (1963), after which his career rapidly waned. He also starred in syndicated crime drama Manhunt.

== Early life ==
Born John Harris Armstrong on July 25, 1937, in St. Louis, Missouri, he was the third child of Louise Armstrong (née McClelland) and Harris Armstrong. He had two older sisters, Joan and Jeffrey. Armstrong's father was a well-known architect who designed many civil landmarks in St. Louis, such as The Shanley Building at 7800 Maryland Avenue in Clayton. Its design won Armstrong the silver medal at the Paris Exposition of 1937.

In 1956, Armstrong graduated from Ladue High School. He moved to California and trained drama at the prestigious acting school Pasadena Playhouse College of Theatre Arts, where he changed his first name to Todd. He graduated in 1958 with classmates including Dustin Hoffman and Gene Hackman.

== Career ==
Armstrong’s wealthy parents set him up with a trust fund but after a couple of years with no success landing acting roles, he took part-time work as a landscape gardener. One of his clients was actress Gloria Henry, who played the mother on the Dennis the Menace television series. Henry learned of her gardener's acting aspirations and was impressed enough by Armstrong's good looks to arrange for him to get a screen test at Columbia Pictures, where she was under contract. He landed a supporting role in the third season of the television show Manhunt, playing Detective Carl Spencer in thirteen episodes in the 1961 season (credited as Todd Armstrong). In 1962, Armstrong made his film debut with a small role in director Edward Dmytryk's drama Walk on the Wild Side (sole credit as Todd Anderson). He made his second movie appearance that year in Five Finger Exercise (his credit reverted to Todd Armstrong).

His first and most prominent leading role in a film was portraying the title character in Jason and the Argonauts (1963). A majority of the cast were British, and Armstrong's voice and that of his co-star Nancy Kovack were dubbed by British actors, with Tim Turner voicing the character of Jason. Todd had only one additional leading role, in the 1965 World War II film King Rat, after which he receded to supporting parts in pictures such as Dead Heat on a Merry-Go-Round (1966), and gradually moved back into television work. His final credit as an actor was in Icebound in the Antarctic (1983), portraying Raymond Shackleton.

== Death ==
Armstrong "married a pianist and settled down in the Virgin Islands". In 1992, he suffered an injury while working, and soon became addicted to painkillers. After this, he died of a self-inflicted gunshot wound on November 17 of that same year. He was 55.

== Filmography ==
Year	Title	Role	Notes
1962	Walk on the Wild Side	Lt. Omar Stroud	
1962	Five Finger Exercise	Tony Blake	
1963	Jason and the Argonauts	Jason	
1965	King Rat	Tex	
1966	The Silencers	Guard	Uncredited
1966	Dead Heat on a Merry-Go-Round	Alfred Morgan	
1966	Winnetou and Old Firehand	Tom	
1967	A Time for Killing	Lt. 'Pru' Prudessing	

== Television ==
Year	Title	Role	Notes
1961	Manhunt	Detective Carl Spencer	13 episodes
1966	Scalplock	Dave Tarrant	Pilot
1968	Gunsmoke	John Wing/John August	2 episodes
1974	Nakia		Episode: "The Driver"
1975	Hawaii Five-O	Curt Anderson	Episode: "Target? The Lady"
1982	The Greatest American Hero	Ted McSherry	Episode: "A Chicken in Every Pot"
1983	Shackleton	Raymond Shackleton	TV film
