= Mural on Our Street =

1965 film

- Directed by: Dee Dee Halleck
- Produced by: Kirk Smallman
- Production company: Henry Street Settlement
- Distributed by: Contemporary Films
- Release date: 1965
- Running time: 10 minutes
- Country: United States
- Language: English

Mural on Our Street is a 1965 American short documentary film directed by Dee Dee Halleck. It was nominated for an Academy Award for Best Documentary Short.

== See also ==
- List of American films of 1965
