= Alexandrea Owens-Sarno =

American actress who played a cameo in Titanic

- Born: Alexandrea Kathryn Owens-Sarno; November 9, 1988 (age 37); San Diego, California, US
- Other names: Alexandrea Owens
- Occupation: Actress
- Years active: 1997; 2014–present
- Known for: Cora Cartmell in Titanic

Alexandrea Owens-Sarno (born November 9, 1988) is an American actress. She is best known for her role as eight-year-old Cora Cartmell, a young steerage passenger in the 1997 film Titanic who dances with Jack Dawson (Leonardo DiCaprio) at an Irish party.

== Biography ==
You're still my best girl, Cora.

–Jack Dawson to Cora Cartmell after switching partners to dance with Rose

Owens-Sarno made her acting debut as Cora Cartmell in James Cameron's 1997 epic, Titanic. Her mother took her and her younger sister Rachel, then 3, to audition for roles at the film's set in Rosarito Beach, Baja California. Owens-Sarno, then in third grade, lined up with ten other girls, all blonde, said a few lines and danced a few steps with the casting director, and was dismissed. A week later she was offered the role of Cora; her mother and sister were cast as extras. The family spent six months on location during the filming.

She became known as "the Titanic girl" among her schoolmates, and has since been asked many times what it was like to perform opposite Leonardo DiCaprio, then a teenage heartthrob, who played the lead role of Jack Dawson. She recalls that he was very "sweet" to her, getting her peanut butter and jelly sandwiches, making faces at her from behind the camera, and chatting with her between takes. He also romped around and played tickling games with her younger sister.

Following her appearance in Titanic, Owens-Sarno hired an agent and began auditioning for other film roles. She was constantly recognized on the street and asked for autographs, and finally decided to take a break from acting. However, she has dutifully kept up with fan mail over the years and sends out autographed pictures of herself in her Titanic role. After college she moved to Los Angeles and enrolled in acting classes. She presently works in improv and sketch comedy.
