= Point of View (film) =

1965 film

- Production company: Vision Associates Productions
- Distributed by: National Tuberculosis Association
- Release date: 1965
- Country: United States
- Language: English

Point of View is a 1965 American short documentary film. It was nominated for an Academy Award for Best Documentary Short.

== See also ==
- List of American films of 1965
