= Nuh Omar =

Pakistani filmmaker (born 1988)

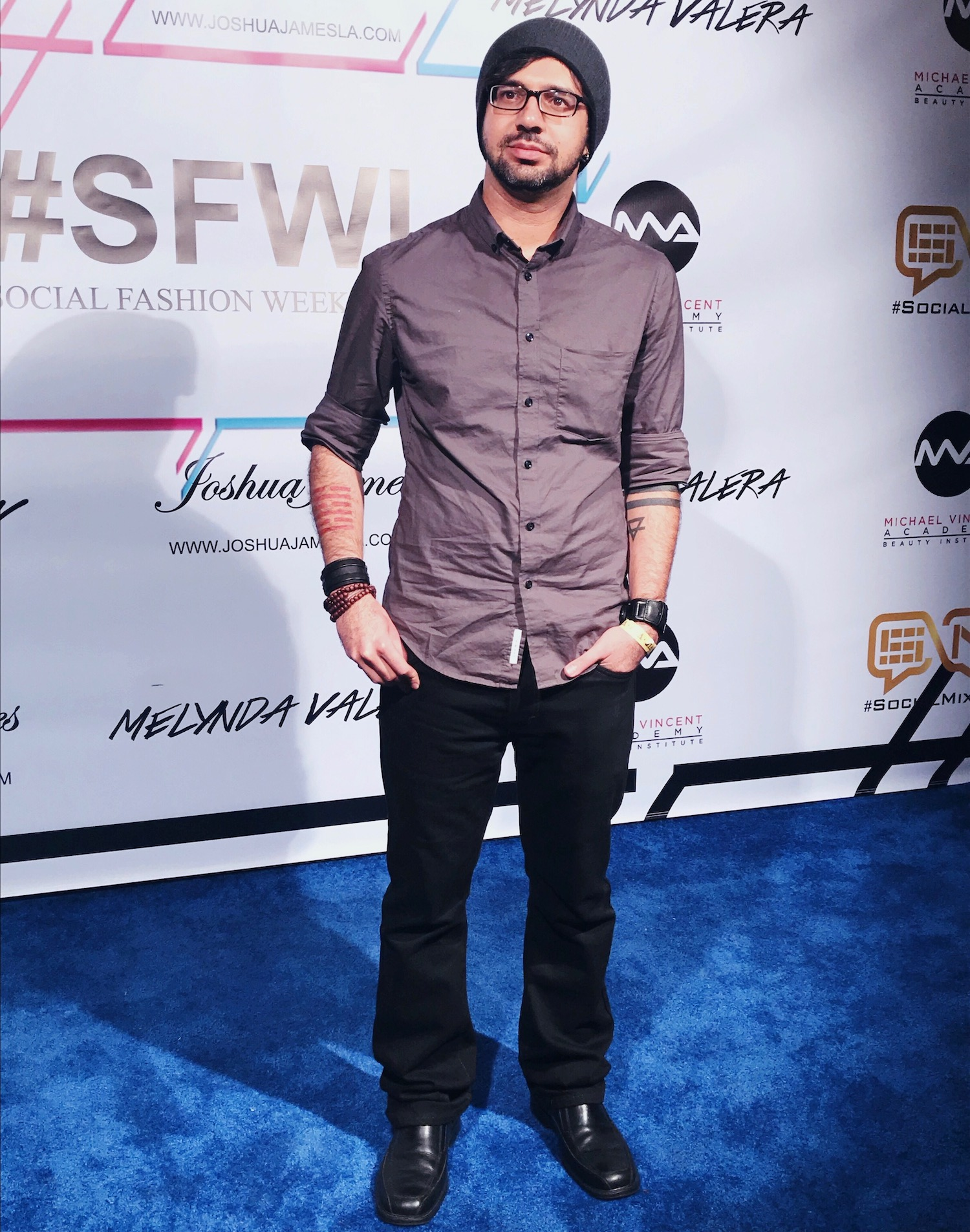
- Nuh Omar in Beverly Hills in 2019
- Born: 5 June 1988 (age 38); Karachi, Pakistan
- Education: BA, Science of Film
- Alma mater: Full Sail University
- Occupations: Director, writer, producer, creator

Nuh Omar (born June 5, 1988) is a director and screenwriter, originally from Pakistan.

== Background ==
Nuh was born in Karachi, Pakistan into the Indian/Pakistani Kureishi family He is the grandson of entrepreneur Safdar Kureishi, the older brother of Omar Kureishi. Family members include Hanif Kureishi and Maki Kureishi. He received his early educated at Karachi Grammar School, a classmate of Bilawal Bhutto Zardari. He has an older sister and a younger brother. His mother was Pakistan’s first female sports photojournalist.

== Education ==
He went to the New York Film Academy in 2006, where he participated in its first 2nd Year Film Program. He then went to Full Sail University where he received his bachelor's degree in The Science of Film.

== Career ==
After graduating from Full Sail, Nuh interned for Scott Gardenhour at The Institute. He worked as a freelance assistant director, having worked on a number of award-winning shorts, as well as working behind the scenes as a documentarian. He wrote and produced the short film We're Americans, Eh?, which received the Audience Award and the award for Best Wardrobe in 2011 at the 24 Hour Film Festival.

In 2012, Nuh returned to Pakistan. In collaboration with Y Productions and producer Ayesha Jalil, he directed a series of short films for Engro Corporation Excellence Awards. His Engro film on the sculptor Shahid Sajjad, Mojiza-e-Fun (The Miracle of Art), was the final project to feature Sajjad before he died.

He then did freelance work writing and directing a variety of internet-based projects, as well as ghostwriting commercials in the country. In mid-2012, he attached himself to now defunct DeVida Lifestyle, an entertainment channel, as an in-house & promo director.

In early-2013, Nuh was hired by advertising agency IAL Saatchi & Saatchi, where he worked as a creative and ad man under COO Imtisal Abbasi and ECD Rashna Abdi on Procter & Gamble brands. He worked on a number of global projects and brands, including Head & Shoulders, Safeguard, Pampers and Commander Safeguard. He parted with the company in early 2014 to return to filmmaking.

In November 2015, he began directing and writing episodes for The Fortress of Dorkness, a YouTube resource channel for pop culture movies and comics created by producer and his long-time collaborator, Christian Villarreal. As of 2018, The Fortress of Dorkness has produced over 100 episodes, all written and directed by Nuh. The channel went on hiatus in 2019, with more intended content to be announced in the future.

In 2019, Nuh teamed up with writer Mark Davis to produce The Alexandrian (known then simply as Cleopatra), an episodic historical drama about the dynasty of the infamous ruler of Egypt, Cleopatra, and work on the project is underway.

In 2014, Nuh began writing a modern adaptation of Oscar Wilde’s The Happy Prince. The screenplay, named The Porter & The Stone, has won numerous awards, including Best Short at Screencraft’s Public Domain Competition 2021, and finalist at The Atlanta Film Festival Screenplay Competition 2022. As of early 2022, it was ranked the number one in the categories of Family and Family-Short on Coverfly’s aggregated ranking system, was in the Top 1% of all projects on Coverfly, and was featured on the Coverfly Red List.

His TV pilot screenplay, A Matter of Time, co-written with Christian Villarreal, won the grand prize at Filmmatic’s TV Pilot Awards Season 6 as Best TV Pilot, along with numerous other accolades, and is currently being shopped around.

Also in development is I'm Here, a TV series about his own journey in the American heartland told through the eyes of a tabloid journalist that interviews cryptids and creatures of folklore, which he initially began developing as a student in 2007. In 2015, Nuh attempted to turn the series into a comic book, but by 2020 decided to return to its intended television roots. The pilot’s screenplay has been a selection at numerous festivals and competitions.

Nuh is currently working with production company Rustic Lightbulb, and producer Severn Lang, to develop the short The Universe at Midnight and the feature Tijuana Bible, which he will write and direct. The Universe at Midnight is expected to go into production in 2022.

He is also writing two feature films, The Imaginary Friend Society, a family film about imaginary friends, and Ophelia, a story about a man chosen to become the next form of death, and his relationship with a Djinn named Ophelia.

== Personal life ==
Nuh lives and works in Karachi, Pakistan and Los Angeles, CA. He has been openly vocal about his struggles with depression, and is an advocate for mental health awareness.

== Accolades ==
Project	Accolade	Presenter
The Porter and The Stone	Winner - Best Short	Screencraft True Story & Public Domain Competition 2021
The Porter and The Stone	Finalist	Atlanta Film Festival Screenplay Competition 2022
The Porter and The Stone	Finalist	Hollyshorts Screenwriting Competition 2021
The Porter and The Stone	Finalist	Outstanding Screenplays Shorts Competition 2021
The Porter and The Stone	Semifinalist	Big Apple Film Festival Screenplay Competition Fall 2021
The Porter and The Stone	Semifinalist	Filmmatic Short Screenplay Awards Season 6 2021
The Porter and The Stone	Semifinalist	SF Indie Film Fest – San Francisco IndieFest Screenplay Competition 2022
The Porter and The Stone	Top 1% Genre/ Format	Coverfly Red List
A Matter of Time	Winner	Filmmatic TV Pilot Awards Season 6 2021
A Matter of Time	Semifinalist	Big Apple Film Festival Screenplay Competition Spring 2021
A Matter of Time	Semifinalist	Filmmatic Drama Screenplay Awards Season 6 2021
A Matter of Time	Semifinalist	Filmmatic Pitch Now Screenplay Competition Season 4
A Matter of Time	Semifinalist	So Cal Screenplay Competition: The Southern California Screenplay Competition 2021
A Matter of Time	Quarterfinalist	SWN TV Pilot Screenplay Competition 2021
I'm Here	Semifinalist	So Cal Screenplay Competition – The Southern California Screenplay Competition 2021
I'm Here	Quarterfinalist	Screencraft TV Pilot Script Competition 2022
I'm Here	Quarterfinalist	Outstanding Screenplays TV Pilot Competition 2021
I'm Here	Quarterfinalist	SWN TV Pilot Screenplay Competition 2021
We're Americans, Eh?	Audience Award	24 Hour Film Festival 2011
We're Americans, Eh?	Best Wardrobe	24 Hour Film Festival 2011
