= The Slender Thread =

1965 film by Sydney Pollack

- 1965 theatrical poster
- Directed by: Sydney Pollack
- Written by: Stirling Silliphant (writer); Shana Alexander (article); David Rayfiel (uncredited)
- Produced by: Stephen Alexander
- Starring: Sidney Poitier; Anne Bancroft; Telly Savalas; Steven Hill
- Cinematography: Loyal Griggs
- Edited by: Thomas Stanford
- Music by: Quincy Jones
- Production company: Athene Productions
- Distributed by: Paramount Pictures
- Release date: December 23, 1965
- Running time: 98 minutes
- Country: United States
- Language: English
- Box office: $1.5 million (rentals)

The Slender Thread is a 1965 American drama film starring Anne Bancroft and Sidney Poitier. It was the first feature-length film directed by future Oscar-winning director, producer and actor Sydney Pollack.

Poitier portrays Alan, a college student who is volunteering at Seattle's then-new Crisis Clinic, a suicide prevention hotline. Shortly after beginning his solo duty on the night shift, Alan receives a call from a woman named Inga (Bancroft) who says she has just taken a lethal dose of pills and wants to talk to someone before she dies. The story line follows the efforts of Alan, a psychiatrist (Telly Savalas) and a detective (Ed Asner) to locate Inga and her husband Mark (Steven Hill), who is on a local fishing vessel. Various flashback scenes depict the events that led Inga to make the attempt on her life.

The film was inspired by a Life magazine article by Shana Alexander about actual events. The film is set in Seattle, and includes scenes shot on location, as well as an opening tracking aerial shot of Seattle circa 1965.

This movie is noted for the physical tracing of the call to find Inga (Bancroft) before she dies. Throughout the movie, the call is traced by hand through several electro-mechanical telephone central office switches which leads to the hotel where Inga was staying (at the Hyatt House, since demolished) near the Seattle–Tacoma International Airport.

== Plot ==
Early one evening, psychology student Alan Newell (Sidney Poitier) rushes from the university to his shift as a volunteer telephone attendant at Seattle's then-new Crisis Clinic. As he drives past the Ballard Bridge, he doesn't notice the car being driven erratically in the opposite lane by a woman (Anne Bancroft) with whose path his will cross later on.

As Alan arrives at the clinic, Dr. Joe Coburn (Telly Savalas), who is on his way out, gives him his telephone number for use only in case of an emergency. Marian the secretary (Indus Arthur) prepares coffee before leaving as well. Now alone, Alan is prepared for an uneventful evening as he prepares to study while manning the phones. The only call he receives is some ramblings from a drunken barber.

Then Alan receives a call from a woman who claims she has ingested a large amount of barbiturates, intending to kill herself, and wants to talk with someone before she dies. Realizing that she is serious, Alan, with the pretense of getting coffee, puts down the phone. On another line, he calls the phone company to trace the call and have the police bring Dr. Coburn back to the clinic. Alan then returns to his call with the woman.

Eventually, Dr. Coburn returns and the call is put on speaker. Marian returns as well to help, and they are joined by a medical technician who monitors the woman's progress as he listens in. At the same time, off-duty Detective Ridley (Edward Asner) joins the police as they search for the woman, whose name Alan learns is Inga (the same woman seen driving recklessly at the beginning of the film). Through flashbacks, Inga begins to recall the events that led up to her desperate situation.

Sometime earlier, Inga's husband Mark (Steven Hill), a commercial fisherman, inadvertently finds out that he is not the biological father of their twelve-year-old son Chris (Greg Jarvis) – something which Inga never had the nerve to tell Mark. Mark takes it hard. A fun night out and a suicide attempt by Inga later on does little for him to forgive her.

As Alan continues to talk to Inga while being supervised by Dr. Coburn, the phone company traces the call using the technology of the day. Meanwhile, Ridley finds Inga's abandoned car, as the police continue their desperate search for her.

The call is finally traced to a hotel near the airport, where Ridley and the police search frantically for Inga. Back at the clinic, Alan and the team are relieved to hear the police entering the room and finding Inga still alive. At that moment, Mark, who was away on an expedition, enters the clinic with the police. He thanks Alan for his help before being taken by the police to be with Inga at the hospital.

Dr. Coburn also leaves for the hospital along with the medical technician, leaving Alan and Marian at the clinic. Relieved and emotionally spent, Alan lets out a triumphant cheer before continuing with the rest of his shift.

== Cast ==
- Sidney Poitier – Alan Newell
- Anne Bancroft – Inga Dyson
- Telly Savalas – Dr. Joe Coburn
- Steven Hill – Mark Dyson
- Edward Asner – Det. Judd Ridley
- Indus Arthur – Marian
- Paul Newlan – Sgt. Harry Ward
- Dabney Coleman – Charlie
- H.N. Wynant – Doctor Morris
- Robert Hoy – Patrolman Steve Peters
- Greg Jarvis – Chris Dyson

== Production ==
On January 6, 1965, it was announced in Daily Variety that Paramount Pictures had secured the rights to produce "Voice in the Wind," a screenplay written by Stirling Silliphant. The script was based on the Life magazine article "Decision to Die," published on May 29, 1964, which chronicled the real-life story of a woman in Seattle, Washington, who attempted suicide. Originally developed as a 100-page treatment for Metro-Goldwyn-Mayer (MGM), the project faced rejection from the studio due to creative differences. Paramount's production president, Howard W. Koch, then acquired the treatment and enlisted Sidney Poitier to star. On April 21, 1965, Daily Variety revealed the film's title had been changed to Call Me Back!

Sydney Pollack, making his motion picture directing debut, was chosen to helm the project, having previously directed and starred in various television programs. In January 1965, Elizabeth Ashley was initially cast as "Inga Dyson," but a third party later informed her that she had been replaced by Anne Bancroft without formal notice. Allegedly, Ashley had turned down a lucrative opportunity worth $100,000 due to her commitment to the project, leading to a legal dispute with the studio. By November 1965, the lawsuit was settled out of court.

Principal photography began on June 14, 1965. Paramount changed the film's title to The Slender Thread after agreeing to relinquish the rights to the title "Call Me Back" to accommodate negotiations for a feature project based on a 1960 NBC teleplay of the same name. Filming took place at Paramount Studios in Hollywood, California, as well as on location in Seattle. Poitier's scenes were filmed on a sound stage, while Bancroft read her lines offstage or through a receiver in her dressing room wired with a live telephone connection. The production incurred a daily expenditure of approximately $12,000 during location shoots. Filming concluded in late June or early July 1965.

The Slender Thread was slated for a special engagement at the Stanley Warner Theater in Beverly Hills, California, on December 15, 1965, to qualify for Academy Award consideration. The film then opened in New York City on December 23, 1965, with a general release in early 1966.

== Awards ==
The film was nominated for two Academy Awards:

- Best Art Direction-Set Decoration, Black-and-White (Hal Pereira, Jack Poplin, Robert R. Benton, and Joseph Kish)
- Best Costume Design, Black-and White (Edith Head)

== Reception ==
At the time, the film received indifferent reviews and did poor business at the box office upon release. However, more recent reviews give it a favorable score of 83%.

== Musical score and soundtrack ==
The Slender Thread

Soundtrack album by Quincy Jones
- Released: 1966
- Recorded: 1965
- Genre: Film score
- Length: 24:47
- Label: Mercury; MG 21070/SR 61070
- Producer: Quincy Jones

Quincy Jones chronology
Mirage (1965)	The Slender Thread (1966)	Quincy's Got a Brand New Bag (1966)

Professional ratings
Review scores
Source	Rating
Allmusic	3.5/5 stars

The film score was composed, arranged and conducted by Quincy Jones, and the soundtrack album was released on the Mercury label in 1966.

=== Reception ===
The Vinyl Factory said "at only 26 minutes this soundtrack may be short on time but not quality. All smooth jazz grooves and rollicking vibes and gorgeous orchestrations, it’s a nice summation of the talents Jones acquired as a jazz music student in Paris in the late 1950s".

=== Track listing ===
All compositions by Quincy Jones

1. "Preludium (Main Title Part II)" − 2:27
2. "Main Theme (Main Title Part I)" − 2:02
3. "Threadbare (Main Title Part III)" − 2:14
4. "Aftermath" − 2:43
5. "Fox's Sugar" − 3:27
6. "Funny Farm" − 1:31
7. "Theme for Inga" − 2:30
8. "Psychosis" − 3:06
9. "No Place to Go" − 3:08
10. "Big Sir" − 2:15

=== Personnel ===
- Unidentified orchestra arranged and conducted by Quincy Jones including
  - Plas Johnson - tenor sax
  - David Grusin - piano
  - Howard Roberts - guitar
  - Carol Kaye - electric bass
  - Emil Richards - percussion

== See also ==
- List of American films of 1965
