= King Rat (film) =

1965 war film by Bryan Forbes

- Theatrical release poster
- Directed by: Bryan Forbes
- Screenplay by: Bryan Forbes
- Based on: King Rat (1962 novel) by James Clavell
- Produced by: James Woolf
- Starring: George Segal; Tom Courtenay; James Fox; Denholm Elliott; Todd Armstrong; Patrick O'Neal; James Donald; John Mills
- Cinematography: Burnett Guffey
- Edited by: Walter Thompson
- Music by: John Barry
- Production company: Coleytown Productions
- Distributed by: Columbia Pictures
- Release dates: October 27, 1965 (New York City); December 2, 1965 (London)
- Running time: 134 minutes
- Countries: United States; United Kingdom
- Language: English

King Rat is a 1965 war film written and directed by Bryan Forbes, adapted from James Clavell's 1962 novel, which in turn is partly based on Clavell's experiences as a POW at Changi Prison in Singapore during the Second World War. It stars George Segal, Tom Courtenay, James Fox, Denholm Elliott, Todd Armstrong, Patrick O'Neal, James Donald and John Mills.

The film was released by Columbia Pictures on October 27, 1965, to generally positive reviews. It received Academy Award nominations for Best Cinematography and Best Art Direction.

== Plot ==
Corporal King is an American prisoner of war held in a Japanese prison camp populated largely by British and Australian servicemen. While his fellow prisoners struggle with sickness and starvation, King prospers through black-market dealings. Among those struggling to survive is Flight Lieutenant Peter Marlowe, an upper-class British RAF officer determined to maintain his civilized standards despite the harsh conditions. After King recruits Marlowe as a translator, Marlowe develops an appreciation for King's resourcefulness and cunning while King's feelings for Marlowe remain ambiguous. When Marlowe is injured, King obtains expensive medication to save his gangrenous arm from amputation and remains at his bedside throughout his illness. It's not clear if King's devotion is genuine friendship or self-interest.

Lieutenant Grey, a lower-class, seemingly incorruptible, British Provost finds King contemptible, but faces an unrelated dilemma by accidentally discovering the high-ranking officer in charge of the meagre food rations has been stealing. He rejects a bribe and takes the matter to Colonel George Smedley-Taylor who tells him the corrupt officer and his assistant have been relieved of their duties without discipline. Grey accuses Smedley-Taylor of being in on the scheme, but is unable to provide proof. Smedley-Taylor promotes the conflicted Grey to acting captain. King breeds rats for meat to sell to the British officers, telling them it is mouse-deer. When a pet dog is put down for killing a chicken, King has it cooked and secretely served. His friends protest when they discover the meat's origin but begin to crave it.

The prisoners celebreate when the Japanese commander announced Japan has surrendered and the war is over. King realizes he is no longer the de facto ruler of the camp, and manages to squelch a premature attempt by resentful underling First Sergeant Max to reassert his rank and authority. Weaver, a lone British paratrooper, arrives to liberate the camp. The prisoners are so shocked that only King is able to respond to Weaver's questions. Weaver is immediately suspicious of King's clean and healthy appearance. As King prepares to depart from the camp with other Americans prisoners, he belittles his friendship with Marlowe, telling him he was nothing more than a paid employee. King and the Americans leave before Marlowe can say goodbye to King. Grey makes a final disparaging remark about King, and Marlowe tells him to be grateful since it was his hatred of King that kept him alive.

== Cast ==
- George Segal as Corporal King
- Tom Courtenay as Lieutenant (later Acting Captain) Robin Grey
- James Fox as Flight Lieutenant Peter Marlowe
- John Mills as Colonel Percy Smedley-Taylor
- Patrick O'Neal as 1st Sergeant Max
- Denholm Elliott as Lieutenant-Colonel Larkin
- James Donald as Dr. Kennedy
- Todd Armstrong as Tex
- Gerald Sim as Lieutenant-Colonel Jones
- Leonard Rossiter as Major McCoy
- Joe Turkel as Dino
- John Standing as Captain Daven
- John Merivale as Colonel Foster
- Geoffrey Bayldon as Vexley
- Alan Webb as Colonel Brant
- John Ronane as Captain Hawkins
- Sam Reese as Kurt
- Dale Ishimoto as Sergeant Yoshima, guard
- Teru Shimada as Japanese General
- Michael Lees as Stevens
- Wright King as Major Brough
- Hedley Mattingly as Dr. Prudhomme
- Hamilton Dyce as The Padre
- Edward Ashley as Prouty
- John Warburton as The Commandant
- Reg Lye as Tinker Bell
- Richard Dawson as Captain Weaver
- Louis Neervort as Torusumi, guard
- George Pelling as Major Barry
- Mickey Simpson as US Sergeant

Credits from the AFI Catalog of Feature Films.

== Production ==
Bryan Forbes was offered the job of writing the script and directing by James Woolf. Forbes called Clavell's novel "stunning" but said

Faced with the task of condensing its 400 pages into screenplay form, I stripped away those portions of the novel I did not wholeheartedly admire (mostly the introduction of native girls which, though possibly authentic, belonged to the realm of Dorothy Lamour) and posed one single question: how did men survive under such conditions? It is my most complex screenplay, with little action and mostly concerned with the interplay of character.

Carl Foreman was originally attached to produce, with a cast including Peter O'Toole, Trevor Howard, John Mills and Albert Finney. However, he left the project in late 1963, claiming he had "[felt] now I have nothing more to say about war," after making four consecutive films on the subject.

Forbes wanted to shoot exteriors in Singapore, and interiors at a studio in Britain. Columbia's new head of production Mike Frankovich wanted to show he was opposed to "runaway productions", and insisted on shooting the entire film in Southern California. A ranch was discovered at Thousand Oaks that was turned into the camp.

Forbes said he and Woolf had a battle with Columbia "who were adamant that we should employ a variety of middle-aged Americans" in the film. He and Woolf arranged it that "in return for employing every resident British actor in Hollywood on the SAG list, we were allowed to import a quota from England." Forbes said the British actors "were selected for their slimness as well as their acting talents and asked to stay on a strict diet until their roles were completed."

Forbes said Columbia's suggestions for the title role included Frank Sinatra, Robert Mitchum, James Garner, and Burt Lancaster, but he felt these would "have made nonsense for Clavell's novel" and he insisted on George Segal. (Michael Callan had also been linked with the part.) The director also insisted on black and white photography. Dirk Bogarde declined the role of Smedley-Taylor. Forbes later called making the film:

A watershed in my professional life, a unique experience I am unlikely to repeat. I was being paid to create something I passionately believed in with the absolute minimum of interference and the maximum loyalty and co-operation of studio, cast and crew alike. I learnt a great deal from that American crew and however fortunate I am in the future, the situation will never be quite as perfect again. It was a hard, physical film to make, not without its moments of despair and indeed desperation, but at the end of the sixty-two shooting days I was so affected I could scarcely talk for fear of breaking down.

The movie previewed poorly and led to Forbes deleting some scenes, and toning down anti-religious passages.

== Reception ==
=== Critical reception ===
Stanley Kauffmann of The New Republic wrote "The film (King Rat) is dexterously made. It is also meretricious, imitative, thematically muddy'. Kauffmann went on to praise the performances in the movie, especially James Fox's.

The film has been praised for its realism and cinematography. Moreover, George Segal's performance has been cited as one of the strongest of his career.

Filmink argued "there was some sex in the novel but Bryan Forbes removed it, which possibly hurt the film at the box office." On the review aggregator website Rotten Tomatoes, 100% of 5 critics' reviews are positive.

=== Creators' response ===
James Clavell later said "my feeling is the film failed because Forbes took away the story thread and made it a composite of character studies".

Forbes was unhappy with what he felt was a misleading ad campaign. He said the film "made little or no impression in America, although it was given long and impressive reviews by the top-line critics — but I remain convinced that whatever chance it had was thrown away by run-of-the-mill and basically dishonest exploitation. Now it has become a cult film on the university campuses, but in 1965 when it was first shown Vietnam was still a clean war, and the American mass audiences were unlikely to take kindly to such a cynical view of human behaviour. It had no happy or heroic ending and said some unpopular things about the American dream. The real audience, the audience for whom it was intended, stayed away."

He later clarified the film "proved to be a success everywhere but in America, at one time playing in four cinemas simultaneously on the Champs-Élysées."

John Mills wrote the film "showed how unpredictable this funny old business can be. It was a wonderful script, a great cast and one of the best directorial jobs Bryan Forbes has ever done... Everybody loved the picture but it wasn’t a success. The only thing I can put it down to is that there was no gorgeous, glamorous girl, no love interest."

=== Awards and nominations ===
Ceremony	Category	Nominee(s)	Result
38th Academy Awards	Best Cinematography	Burnett Guffey	Nominated
38th Academy Awards	Best Art Direction	Robert Emmet Smith, Frank Tuttle	Nominated
19th British Academy Film Awards	United Nations Award	Bryan Forbes	Nominated

== See also ==
- List of American films of 1965

== Bibliography ==
- Forbes, Bryan (1974). Notes for a Life. Collins. ISBN 9780002115674.
- Forbes, Bryan (1993). A Divided Life: Memoirs. Pearson Education New Zealand Limited. ISBN 9780434268283.
