= Robert Emmet Smith =

American art director

- Born: August 21, 1914; California
- Died: August 2, 1988 (aged 73); Newport Beach, California
- Occupation: Art director
- Years active: 1956–1976

Robert Emmet Smith (August 21, 1914 – August 2, 1988) was an American art director and production designer. He was nominated for an Academy Award in the category Best Art Direction for the film King Rat.

== Early life and career ==
Robert Emmet Smith, also known as Bob Smith, was born to Edward Smith on August 21, 1914. Smith graduated from the University of Southern California School of Architecture and was a master mason. He established his career as a motion picture art director and production designer. His numerous credits include motion pictures such as Rio Lobo, Hombre, Lonely are the Brave, A Big Hand for the Little Lady, Operation Petticoat, and King Rat, which garnered him an Academy Award nomination for Best Art Direction in 1966. Bob Smith died in Newport Beach, California on Aug. 2, 1988.

== Selected filmography ==
- The Duchess and the Dirtwater Fox (1976)
- King Rat (1965)
- Operation Petticoat (1959)
- The Monolith Monsters (1957)
- Interlude (1957)
- Slaughter on Tenth Avenue (1957)
- The Mole People (1956)
- Behind the High Wall (1956)
- The Creature Walks Among Us (1956)
