= Jack Poplin =

American art director (1920–2007)

- Born: November 18, 1920; Los Angeles, California
- Died: October 15, 2007 (aged 86)
- Occupation: Art director
- Years active: 1950-1988

Jack Poplin (November 18, 1920 – October 15, 2007) was an American art director. He was nominated for an Academy Award in the category Best Art Direction for the film The Slender Thread.

== Selected filmography ==
- The Slender Thread (1965)
