= Chris Baker (artist) =

English artist (born 1960)

Christopher "Fangorn" Baker
- Born: Christopher Baker; 17 August 1960 (age 66) Birmingham, England
- Areas: Painter, illustrator
- Pseudonym: Fangorn
- Notable works: Redwall

Christopher Baker (usually known as Chris Baker but also professionally as Fangorn), (born 17 August 1960 in Birmingham, England) is a cover artist for British and German versions of the Redwall books, as well as a storyboard and film conceptual artist, most notably with filmmakers Stanley Kubrick and Tim Burton.

Baker's pseudonym "Fangorn" is derived from the name of a forest in J. R. R. Tolkien's The Lord of the Rings novel.

== Biography ==
Baker received his education at the Bournville School of Art.

In the early 1990s, Fangorn provided art for Games Workshop, including the covers art of boxed games Advanced Space Crusade, the Space Hulk supplements Deathwing and Genestealer, and Battle for Armageddon, as well as the covers of several issues of White Dwarf magazine. He also worked alongside Stan Nicholls creating the art for the David Gemmell graphic novels Legend and Waylander.

In addition to his many covers in the Redwall series, Fangorn also contributed artwork to Redwall Map & Riddler and Redwall Friend & Foe.

He won the 2019 BSFA Award for Best Artwork for his cover for Wourism and Other Stories by Ian Whates (Luna Press)

== Bibliography ==
=== Graphic novels ===
- David Gemmell's Legend
- Wolf in Shadow

=== Films ===
- Skyfall (2012) — concept design and storyboards*
- Charlie and the Chocolate Factory (2005) — concept/storyboards (in 2004)
- Corpse Bride (2005) — concept design (in 2003)
- Big Fish (2003) — storyboards (in 2002)
- Road to Perdition (2002) — storyboards (in 2000)
- The Time Machine (2002) — concept/storyboard artist (uncredited) (in 2000)
- Artificial Intelligence: A.I. (2001) — concept/storyboard artist (in 1999)
- Eyes Wide Shut (1999) — concept artist (in 1996)

=== Book covers ===
- Redwall Calendar 1995
- Redwall Diary 1996
- Redwall Tenth Anniversary Edition
- Mossflower
- Mattimeo
- Mariel of Redwall
- Salamandastron
- Martin the Warrior
- The Bellmaker
- Outcast of Redwall
- The Pearls of Lutra
- The Long Patrol
- Marlfox (cover and illustrations)
- The Legend of Luke (cover and illustrations)
- Lord Brocktree (cover and illustrations)
- The Taggerung
