= The Long Patrol (disambiguation) =

The Long Patrol is a 1997 fantasy novel, part of the Redwall series by Brian Jacques.

The Long Patrol may also refer to:

- The Long Patrol, a fictional army of hares in the Redwall series
- "The Long Patrol" (Battlestar Galactica), a 1978 episode of Battlestar Galactica
- Carlson's patrol, a guerrilla action by US Marines on Guadalcanal during World War II
