= Triss =

2002 novel by Brian Jacques

- UK first edition cover
- Author: Brian Jacques
- Illustrator: David Elliot
- Cover artist: David Wyatt
- Language: English
- Series: Redwall
- Release number: 15
- Genre: Fantasy novel
- Publisher: Viking (UK) & Philomel (US)
- Publication date: 2002
- Publication place: United Kingdom
- Media type: Print (hardback and paperback)
- Pages: 416 (UK Hardback) & 400 (US Hardback)
- ISBN: 0-670-91067-8 (UK Hardback) & ISBN 0-399-23723-2 (US Hardback)
- OCLC: 50214982
- Preceded by: The Taggerung
- Followed by: Loamhedge

Triss is a fantasy novel by Brian Jacques, published in 2002. It is the 15th book in the Redwall series.

== Plot summary ==
From the fortress at Riftgard in their kingdom in the far north, the ferret king, King Agarnu, and his cruel offspring, Princess Kurda and Prince Bladd hold sway over a Ratguard army and enslaved creatures. One of the slaves, Trisscar Swordmaid the Eurasian red squirrel escapes with her friends Shogg the European otter and Welfo the common hedgehog, southward to Mossflower. In the attempt, her friend Drufo (a fellow squirrel) is killed. Meanwhile, Kurda hires a pirate ship, the Seascab, captained by Plugg Firetail the red fox, to take her to Mossflower, where she must find the royal artefacts of Riftgard to seal her queenship.

In Redwall Abbey, rebellious Dibbuns Ruggum the European mole and Bikkle the squirrel run away into Mossflower Woods. They discover Brockhall, the ancestral home of Eurasian badgers, but are chased away by snakes. Fortunately, they are rescued by the Skipper of Otters and Log-a-Log Groo the common shrew, and they bring with them a golden paw-ring with strange markings.

US cover of Triss

Sagaxus, heir to Salamandastron, and his friend Bescarum Lepuswold Whippscut the hare (who go by Sagax and Scarum respectively), leave the mountain for adventure with Kroova Wavedog, in his ketch the Stopdog. Scarum's father, Colonel Whippscut of the Long Patrol, searches for them in the name of Lord Hightor, the Badger Lord. Sagax finds a bow on the ketch (the property of its previous owners) with similar markings to the pawring. They disregard it and decide to journey to Redwall, and on their way, they wind up in possession of a dagger with the same pattern.

Triss and her friends, in their ship, see the same markings. Triss is able to interpret them as an R, H, O, and R, standing for "Royal House of Riftgard". On the journey, they become dehydrated, but are rescued by the hedgehogs of Peace Island. Welfo remains with her newfound love, Urtica, while Triss and Shogg continue south. They cross paths with Kurda on the Seascab in the middle of a lightning storm, but the contraband vessel escapes.

Meanwhile, the Redwall denizens try to explore Brockhall, but it is inhabited by three serpents, one of which wears a crown with the Riftgard pattern. The common European adders, Zassaliss, Harssacss, and Sesstra, are the children of Berussca, an adder slain by and who in turn slew King Sarengo, Agarnu's father; they remain bound by Sarengo's mace and chain. Ovus, a tawny owl, brings Bluddbeak, an ancient red kite from afar to defeat the adders, but in their attempt, both birds die. Mokug, a golden hamster who had been Sarengo's slave, is rescued and brings with him a message in Riftgard script. Martin the Warrior visits Skipper's niece, Churk, in her dreams, giving the Redwallers the hint they need to decode the message, but it is a riddle that's difficult to interpret.

Elsewhere, Sagax, Scarum, and Kroova are captured by the crew of the Seascab, and the Stopdog is destroyed. Triss and Shogg meet up with them, and together they are able to escape. Kroova and Shogg set up a hidden stake that injures Plugg, and his tail falls off, though he reattaches it with pine resin.

Kurda and her vermin then cross paths with the Redwallers, who fend them off, while Triss, Shogg, Sagax, Scarum, and Kroova enter the safety of the abbey. Triss sees the Sword of Martin and is immediately drawn to it, wielding it as the Redwallers continue to battle the Ratguard army. Bladd is killed by a falling pot of oatmeal, and Plugg is killed by the snakes, while Kurda concentrates her efforts on destroying the denizens of Redwall.

Eventually, Skipper's niece helps solve the riddle, which leads the Redwallers to Brockhall. There they encounter both the Ratguards and the snakes. During the ensuing battle, Shogg, Sagax, and Triss kill Sesstra, Harssacss, and Zassaliss, but Shogg is poisoned and dies by Triss's side. Later, Triss and Kurda face off, but Kurda falls on her own sword and dies.

Triss, Kroova, Sagax, Scarum, Groo, Skipper, Mokug, and others sail to Riftgard and free the slaves. There, King Agarnu is drowned by the slaves. Kroova stays on Riftgard with the sea otter Sleeve, and the others return to Redwall Abbey.

== Characters ==
- The Pure Ferrets:
  - Sarengo
  - Agarnu
  - Kurda
  - Bladd
- Trisscar Swordmaid
- Shogg
- Welfo
- Urtica
- Plugg Firetail
- Skipper of Otters
- Log-a-Log Groo
- Sagaxus (Sagax)
- Bescarum Lepuswold Whippscut (Scarum)
- Kroova Wavedog
- Lord Hightor
- The Adders:
  - Berussca
  - Zassaliss
  - Harssacss
  - Sesstra
- Ovus and Bluddbeak
- Mokug the Hamster
- Riftun
- Abbot Apodemus
- Malbun Grimp
- Memm Flackery
- Riggan
- Rocc Arrem, Trisscar's late father
- Roobil, the leader of the dibbuns against bedtime
- Ruggum
- Colonel Whippscut & Dunfreda, Bescarum's parents
- Crikulus
- Scummy
- Grubbage, a rare, good rat
- Turfee
- Vorto
- Lady Merola, Hightor's wife and Sagaxus' mother

== Translations ==
- (French) Rougemuraille : L'Odyssée de Triss
- (Russian) "Трисс Воительница"

== Book divisions (English) ==
- Book 1: A Season of Runaways
- Book 2: Serpents and Paradoxes
- Book 3: The Swordmaid

Preceded by The Taggerung	Redwall series (chronological order)	Succeeded by Loamhedge
Preceded by A Redwall Winter's Tale	Redwall series (publication order)	Succeeded by Loamhedge
