= Christopher Denise =

American illustrator

- Born: Ashland, Massachusetts
- Education: Rhode Island School of Design
- Occupations: Artist and illustrator
- Website: christopherdenise.com

Christopher Denise is an American artist and author. He illustrated two of Brian Jacques' Redwall picture books, as well as the picture books The Great Redwall Feast and A Redwall Winter's Tale. He also illustrated The Redwall Cookbook.

He wrote and illustrated the children's book Knight Owl which was a 2023 Caldecott Honor book. This book also was chosen by US bookseller 'Barnes & Noble' as a '2022 Book of the Year'.

Denise was born in Ashland, Massachusetts, and raised in Ireland. After returning to the United States he attended St. Lawrence University before leaving to attend the Rhode Island School of Design. He began his artistic career illustrating textbooks and newspapers while a student at RISD.

In addition to illustrating books, he also does visual development work for animated feature films. He and his wife, children's author Anika Denise, lived in Providence, Rhode Island, prior to moving to Barrington, Rhode Island.

== Written & Illustrated Works ==
- Knight Owl (author and illustrator), 2022
- Knight Owl and Early Bird (author and illustrator), 2024

== Illustrated Works ==
- The Great Redwall Feast (by Brian Jacques), 1996
- Little Raccoon Catches a Cold (by Susan Cañizares), 1997
- Digger Pig and the Turnip (by Caron Lee Cohen), 2000
- A Redwall Winter's Tale (by Brian Jacques), 2001
- Oliver Finds His Way (by Phyllis Root), 2002
- Rabbit and Turtle Go to School (by Lucy Floyd), 2003
- The Wishing of Biddy Malone (by Joy Cowley), 2004
- The Redwall Cookbook (by Brian Jacques), 2005
- Pigs Love Potatoes (by Anika Aldamuy Denise), 2008
- If I Could: A Mother's Promise (by Susan Milord), 2008
- Knitty Kitty (by David Elliott), 2008
- The Fox and the Gulls (by Katacha Diaz), 2009
- Me With You (by Kristy Dempsey), 2009
- Bella and Stella Come Home (by Anika Aldamuy Denise), 2010
- Tugg and Teeny (by J. Patrick Lewis) 2011
- Tugg and Teeny: That's What Friends Are For (by J. Patrick Lewis) 2011
- Tugg and Teeny: Jungle Surprises (by J. Patrick Lewis) 2011
- Following Grandfather (by Rosemary Wells), 2012
- Baking Day at Grandma's (by Anika Aldamuy Denise), 2014
- Sleepytime Me (by Edith Hope Fine), 2014
- Firefly Hollow (by Alison McGhee), 2015
- Lucy's Lovey (by Betsy Devany), 2016
- Groundhug Day (by Anne Marie Pace), 2017
- Bunny in the Middle (by Anika A. Denise), 2019
