= The Great Redwall Feast =

1996 picture book by Brian Jaqcues

- First US Edition Cover
- Author: Brian Jacques
- Illustrator: Christopher Denise
- Cover artist: Christopher Denise
- Language: English
- Series: Redwall
- Genre: Fantasy
- Publisher: Hutchinson (UK) & Philomel (US)
- Publication date: 1996
- Publication place: United Kingdom
- Media type: Print (Hardback & Paperback)
- Pages: 64 (UK Hardback) & 64 (US Hardback)
- ISBN: 0-09-972501-0 (UK Hardback) & ISBN 0-399-22707-5 (US Hardback)
- OCLC: 59629180
- Followed by: A Redwall Winter's Tale

The Great Redwall Feast was written by Brian Jacques and illustrated by the well-known Redwall artist Christopher Denise. It was published in 1996.

== Synopsis ==
The Great Redwall Feast is the first Redwall picture book, and it was written in the form of a ballad. The inhabitants of Redwall Abbey prepare a surprise feast for their Abbot.

== Plot summary ==
The Great Redwall Feast tells about the creatures of Redwall preparing for a feast while Matthias the Warriormouse, Constance the Badger Guardian, Foremole, and the Abbot are traveling in Mossflower Woods questing for a mysterious Bobbatan Weary Nod. The book features the Abbeydwellers bustling in Redwall, cooking, gathering flowers, and doing other chores for their beloved Abbot (presumably Abbot Mordalfus). Many characters from Redwall and Mattimeo are present in the book, however, the baby mole Bungo is the only character to appear and not be featured in any other Redwall novel. Bungo does appear in the second picture book A Redwall Winter's Tale.

== Illustrations and significance ==
The warm-colored illustrations by Christopher Denise were drawn on brown butcher paper using pastels, and instead of showing the Redwallers preparing for war, it shows them much happier and friendly, at work in their daily lives.

Brian Jacques remarked that The Great Redwall Feast was "written a little more for mothers to read to their children, but many Redwall lovers will also enjoy it, because there is the challenge of solving a riddle before the end of the rhyme."

== Translations ==
- (German) Das große Festmahl von Redwall

| Preceded by The Pearls of Lutra | Redwall Series (publication order) | Succeeded by The Long Patrol |
