= Outcast of Redwall =

1995 novel by Brian Jacques

- UK first edition cover
- Author: Brian Jacques
- Illustrator: Allan Curless
- Cover artist: Chris Baker
- Language: English
- Series: Redwall
- Release number: 8
- Genre: Fantasy novel
- Publisher: Hutchinson (UK) & Philomel (US)
- Publication date: 1995
- Publication place: United Kingdom
- Media type: Print (hardback and paperback)
- Pages: 375 (UK Hardback) & 360 (US Hardback)
- ISBN: 0-09-176721-0 (UK Hardback) & ISBN 0-399-22914-0 (US Hardback)
- OCLC: 33010820
- Preceded by: The Bellmaker
- Followed by: The Pearls of Lutra

Outcast of Redwall is a 1995 fantasy novel by Brian Jacques. It is the eighth book and chronologically fifth book in the Redwall series.

== Plot summary ==
In the howling, snowy north, a young common kestrel named Skarlath is lost in a snowstorm after leaving the nest, and is captured by the cruel ferret Swartt Sixclaw and his group of vermin. They also have captured a young Eurasian badger who they torment mercilessly. The two captured young animals help each other escape from the vermin camp. In the scuffle that ensues, the badger creates a massive hornbeam limb club. The ferret and the badger both vow to exact revenge, each declaring the other to be his mortal enemy.

As the young badger could not remember his name, Skarlath dubs him Sunflash after the distinctive golden stripe running down his snout. The two young beasts quickly become inseparable friends and travel throughout Mossflower Woods together, defending the weak and helpless and quickly growing older. Sunflash's reputation quickly spreads throughout the land. He eventually molds his hornbeam limb into a fearsome, stone-spiked warclub, calling it his mace.

Meanwhile, Swartt also grows older, stronger, and wiser. He travels the northern lands with his vixen seer Nightshade and his horde and eventually ends up at the camp of Bowfleg, a fat ferret with a large horde who has settled down in a plentiful land. As an earlier leader of Swartt's, his captains are suspicious, and rightly so: with the help of Nightshade, Swartt executes a cunning trick that kills Bowfleg. Swartt takes over his large horde and marries his daughter, Bluefen, who gives birth to his son before dying.

At this point, Sunflash and Skarlath have spent several seasons in the Lingl-Dubbo cave, the home of the families of Tirry Lingl the common hedgehog and Bruff Dubbo the European mole, who Sunflash had rescued from a marauding family of foxes. Sunflash is eventually called to the mountain Salamandastron in his dreams, and so he travels there to become Badger Lord. He and Skarlath part ways, and Sunflash becomes Lord of the Mountain; this section quotes Sunflash's arrival at Salamandastron from the epilogue of Mossflower.

By this time, Swartt Sixclaw and his large horde have passed through the Redwall region of Mossflower, which is efficiently defended by the resident squirrels and otters. However, the nursemaid of Swartt's infant son was trampled, and the infant ferret is dropped in a ditch. He is retrieved by the good-hearted woodlanders and taken to Redwall Abbey despite their misgivings that he will grow into being evil.

At the abbey, the young ferret's fate is determined. Abbess Meriam and Bella of Brocktree decide to entrust the baby to the care of Bryony, a young mousemaid, and Togget, her sensible mole friend. The ferret is named Veil, and as the seasons turn he grows into a young adult in the abbey. As a youngster he is naughty and mischievous, but as a young adult his true vermin nature begins to show through, as the ferret would steal, lie, and be generally unpleasant to all, especially his adopted mother, Bryony. He is eventually banished, by Bella, from the Abbey when he attempts (and fails) to poison Friar Bunfold (with a hedgehog drinking the water used instead, though she survives the poisoning).

Bryony, feeling his banishment was unjust, leaves the abbey to track the ferret down. Her molefriend Togget accompanies her, and together they follow Veil as he wanders through Mossflower. The young ferret, remaining unapologetic and as mean as ever, makes life difficult for the mousemaid and her friend.

Leagues away, Swartt comes upon Salamandastron and launches an attack. Now allied to a smooth-talking ferret corsair named Zigu, an attack is mounted and war begins. Zigu is eventually killed by a skilled hare of the Long Patrol named Sabretache, and Swartt's horde grows once more with Zigu's crew swelling their ranks. With the help of neighbouring woodlanders, the vermin attack is deflected. Sunflash and Skarlath go hunting after them, and Nightshade lays an ambush with poison arrows. In the ensuing attack, Nightshade kills Skarlath with a poison arrow, only to be slain by Sunflash seconds later. Swartt and his depleted horde flee to the mountains east of Salamandastron.

Veil, Bryony and Togget reach the same mountains from the east, and Veil meets his father for the first time. Neither is impressed by the other. Sunflash is stunned and captured by Swartt, and Bryony encounters the evil Swartt Sixclaw. The ferret warlord tries to kill her by throwing a javelin; Veil, in a moment that portrays his true emotions toward the mousemaid, saves her life by taking the javelin, dying in the process. Sunflash then kills Swartt by throwing him from the mountain.

Sunflash, Bryony and Togget return to Redwall. Bryony, unsure if Veil really meant to save her, accepted that the young ferret she always defended had always been evil. She is later made Abbess and Togget is made Foremole. Sunflash meets Bella, his mother, for the first time since he was a child. He stays with her until her death many seasons later, and he then returns to the western coast to rule at Salamandastron.

== Characters in Outcast of Redwall ==
- Sunflash the Mace
- Swartt Sixclaw
- Skarlath the Kestrel
- Bowfleg
- Nightshade
- Bluefen Sixclaw
- Tirry Lingl
- Bruff Dubbo
- Balefur
- Abbess Meriam
- Bella of Brocktree
- Bryony
- Togget
- Barlom
- Veil Sixclaw
- Friar Bunfold
- Zigu
- Long Patrol
  - Sabretache
  - Colonel Sandgall
  - Bradberry
  - Fordpetal
  - Starbuck
  - Breeze
- Krakulat
- Aggal
- Lord Duskskin, a bat
- Bankrose
- Muggra
- Myrtle
- Brool & Renn
- Redfarl
- Rillbrook the Wanderer
- Ruddle Banksnout
- Sumin
- Elmjak
- Folrig Streampaw
- The Wraith, a stealthy weasel
- Welknose
- Jodd (full name Wilthurio Longbarrow Sackfirth Toxophola Fedlric Fritillary Wilfrand Hurdleframe Longarrow Leawelt Pugnacio Cinnabar Hillwether)

== Book divisions (English) ==
- Book 1: A Friendship Made
- Book 2: A Broken Trust
- Book 3: The Warrior's Reckoning

== Translations ==
- (Finnish) Pahan jälkeläinen
- (French) Rougemuraille : Solaris
  - Tome 1 : Le Sauveur à tête d'or
  - Tome 2 : L'Orphelin maudit
  - Tome 3 : Le Jugement du guerrier
- (German) Der Kampf der Gefährten
- (Italian) Il Reietto di Redwall
- (Swedish) Solblixt Stavbäraren
- (Russian) Изгнанник

Preceded by The Legend of Luke	Redwall series (chronological order)	Succeeded by Mariel of Redwall
Preceded by The Bellmaker	Redwall series (publication order)	Succeeded by The Pearls of Lutra
