= Lord Brocktree =

2000 novel by Brian Jacques

- UK first edition cover
- Author: Brian Jacques
- Cover artist: Chris Baker
- Language: English
- Series: Redwall
- Release number: 13
- Genre: Fantasy novel
- Publisher: Hutchinson (UK); Philomel Books (US)
- Publication date: 1 September 2000
- Publication place: United Kingdom
- Media type: Print (hardback and paperback)
- Pages: 388 (UK hardback) & 370 (US hardback)
- ISBN: 0-09-176877-2 (UK hardback) & ISBN 0-399-23590-6 (US Hardback)
- OCLC: 45314325
- Preceded by: The Legend of Luke
- Followed by: The Taggerung

Lord Brocktree is a fantasy novel by Brian Jacques, published in 2000. It is the 13th book in the Redwall series to be published. It is the earliest chronological installment in the series, and the last prequel written by Jacques.

== Synopsis ==
The book focuses on a badger, Lord Brocktree, and haremaid Dotti as they journey towards Salamandastron, the mountain fortress of badger lords, to recapture it from the wildcat Ungatt Trunn.

== Plot summary ==
US cover of Lord Brocktree

This book revolves around the Eurasian badger Lord Brocktree, father of Boar the Fighter, grandfather of Bella of Brockhall, and great-grandfather of Sunflash the Mace. He sets out to find the ancient badger mountain stronghold of Salamandastron, aided by the quick talking haremaid Dorothea Duckfontein Dillworthy and European otter Ruffgar Brookback.

Meanwhile, in Salamandastron, trouble comes for Brocktree's father, Lord Stonepaw. Years of peace have left the mountain stronghold with few fighters, and those that remain are long past their prime, including Stonepaw himself. The European wildcat Ungatt Trunn, son of Mortspear, Highland King of the North, lays siege to the fortress with his Blue Hordes. Eventually the mountain is overrun, leading to the deaths of many hares and even of Stonepaw himself, who dies valiantly defending his hares, taking many vermin with him as he does. The wildcat takes at least sixty hares as prisoners, but through the efforts of warrior Stiffener Medick and his otter friend Brogalaw, they escape.

Lord Brocktree gets an army from the hare Bucko Bigbones, after Dotti defeats him in a contest.

Thanks to the Bark Crew, the group of guerrillas formed by Stiffener and Brogalaw to harass Trunn, the Blue Hordes are slowly starved, their supplies cut off. Ungatt Trunn tricks the Bark Crew into putting up a last stand in battle, but Lord Brocktree joins forces with the hares and saves the day.

The book culminates in a massive final battle, with many memorable characters killed, including Jukka and Fleetscut. Eventually, when the battle ends up a near-stalemate, Trunn and Brocktree face off in a duel. After a failed assassination attempt on Brocktree by the searats Ripfang and Doomeye and the corsair fleet captain Karangool (Trunn's second in command) the badger eventually wins, snapping Trunn's spine and leaving him on the sand to die. Trunn is thrown into the water but survives, only to be drowned by Groddil, one of his former advisors. The book ends with thousands of hares rallying to form the Long Patrol under Brocktree and Dotti (whom the badger names first Long Patrol General).

== Characters in Lord Brocktree ==
- Lord Brocktree
- Dorothea Duckfontein Dillworthy (Dotti)
- Ruffgar Brookback (Ruff)
- Lord Stonepaw
- Lord Russano
- Stiffener Medick
- Torleep
- Sailears
- Ungatt Trunn
- Mortspear, father of Ungatt Trunn
- Brogalaw (Brog)
- Jukka the Sling
- Ruro
- Fleetscut
- Groddil
- Willip
- The Grand Fragorl, advisor of Ungatt Trunn
- Bucko Bigbones, march hare of the North Mountains
- Karangool, Captain of Trunn's fleet
- Skittles, a precocious baby hedgehog
- Ripfang & Doomeye, searat brothers
- Rulango
- Lady Rosalaun
- Melanius
- Mirefleck
- Blench
- Bobweave & Southpaw, twin hares
- Bramwil
- Riggo
- Riverwolf, a pike
- Gurth Longladle
- Grenn, the oldest known and only female log-a-log of the series
- Ruro
- Snowstripe
- Frutch
- Udara Groundslay
- Uncle Septimus

== Book divisions (English) ==
- Book 1: The Days of Ungatt Trunn (also entitled: "Dorothea Leaves Home")
- Book 2: At the Court of King Bucko (also entitled: "The Tribulations of a Haremaid")
- Book 3: Comes a Badger Lord (also entitled: "A Shawl for Aunt Blench")

== Translations ==
- (French) Rougemuraille : La Forteresse en péril
- (Russian) Последняя битва

Preceded by None	Redwall series (chronological order)	Succeeded by Martin the Warrior
Preceded by The Legend of Luke	Redwall series (publication order)	Succeeded by The Taggerung
