= The Redwall Cookbook =

2005 book by Brian Jacques

- US Paperback Cover
- Author: Brian Jacques
- Illustrator: Christopher Denise
- Cover artist: Christopher Denise
- Language: English
- Series: Redwall
- Genre: Cookbook Fantasy
- Publisher: Philomel (US)
- Publication date: 2005
- Publication place: United States
- Media type: Print (Paperback)
- Pages: 96 (US Paperback)
- ISBN: 0-399-23791-7 (US Paperback)
- OCLC: 57641411
- Dewey Decimal: 641.5 22
- LC Class: TX652.5 .J36 2005

The Redwall Cookbook is a cookbook based on food from the Redwall series. It contains recipes mentioned in the books, from Deeper'n'Ever Pie and Summer Strawberry Fizz to Abbey Trifle and Great Hall Gooseberry Fool.

== Summary ==
This book features numerous recipes for dishes mentioned in the Redwall series, and features illustrations by Christopher Denise. The plot follows Sister Pansy through one cycle of the seasons in Redwall Abbey, as she becomes the Head Cook.

The cookbook is divided into the four seasons: Spring, Summer, Autumn and Winter. As befits the cooking of gentle woodland creatures, all of the recipes (with the exception of the obvious crustacean ingredient in Shrimp'n'Hotroot Soup) are completely vegetarian. Each recipe is preceded by a description of who is making the dish and how it is being prepared. There are also short warnings and anecdotes by the characters sprinkled throughout the text.

== Recipes ==
=== Spring Recipes ===
- Hare's Pawspring Vegetable Soup
- Crispy Cheese'n'Onion Hogbake
- Vegetable Casserole à La Foremole
- Gourmet Garrison Grilled Leeks
- Stuffed Springtide Mushrooms
- Abbot's Special Abbey Trifle
- Spiced Gatehouse Tea Bread
- Honeybaked Apples
- Hot Mint Tea

=== Summer Recipes ===
- Hotroot Sunsalad
- Brockhall Badger Carrot Cakes
- Great Hall Gooseberry Fool
- Cheerful Churchmouse Cherry Crisp
- Rosey's Jolly Raspberry Jelly Rock Cakes
- Afternoon Tea Scones with Strawberry Jam and Cream
- Squirrelmum's Blackberry and Apple Cake
- Guosim Shrew Shortbread
- Summer Strawberry Fizz

=== Autumn Recipes ===
- Mole's Favourite Deeper'n'Ever Turnip'n'Tater'n'Beetroot Pie
- Bellringer's Reward (Roast Roots and Baked Spuds)
- October Ale
- Autumn Oat Favourites
- Hare's Haversack Crumble
- Harvestberry Sunset Pudden
- Loamhedge Legacy Nut bread
- Dibbun's Delight
- Golden Hill Pears

=== Winter Recipes ===
- Shrimp'n'Hotroot Soup
- Veggible Molebake
- Savoury Squirrel Bakes
- Outside'n'Inside Cobbler Riddle
- Stones Inna Swamp
- Rubbadeedubb Pudding
- Nunnymolers
- Applesnow
- Mossflower Mulled Cider
