= BSFA Award for Best Artwork =

- Awarded for: The best science fiction or fantasy artwork published in the previous calendar year
- Country: UK
- Presented by: British Science Fiction Association
- First award: 1980
- Currently held by: Nick Wells for 12-book tessellated cover of Fractal Series
- Website: BSFA Awards

The BSFA Awards are given every year by the British Science Fiction Association. The BSFA Award for Best Artwork is open to any artwork with speculative themes that first appeared in the previous year. Provided the artwork hasn't been published before it doesn't matter where it appears. The ceremonies are named after the year that the eligible works were published, despite the awards being given out in the next year.

Prior to 1986 the award was presented for best artist, rather than artwork. Jim Burns won three of the seven Best Artist awards. He went on to win eleven Best Artwork awards.

== Winners ==
- 1979: Jim Burns
- 1980: Peter Jones
- 1981: Bruce Pennington
- 1982: Tim White
- 1983: Bruce Pennington
- 1984: Jim Burns
- 1985: Jim Burns
- 1986: Keith Roberts - cover of The Clocktower Girl
- 1987: Jim Burns - cover of Worldcon Programme Book
- 1988: Alan Lee - cover of Lavondyss by Robert Holdstock
- 1989: Jim Burns - cover of Other Edens III
- 1990: Ian Miller - covers of The Difference Engine and Interzone 40
- 1991: Mark Harrison - cover of Interzone 45
- 1992: Jim Burns - cover of Hearts, Hands and Voices
- 1993: Jim Burns - cover of Red Dust by Paul J. McAuley
- 1994: Jim Burns - cover of Interzone 79
- 1995: Jim Burns – cover of Seasons of Plenty
- 1996: Jim Burns – cover of Ancient Shores
- 1997: SMS – The Black Blood of the Dead, cover of Interzone 116
- 1998: Jim Burns – Lord Prestimion, cover of Interzone 138
- 1999: Jim Burns – cover of Darwinia
- 2000: Dominic Harman – Hideaway, cover of Interzone 157)
- 2001: Colin Odell – cover of Omegatropic
- 2002: Dominic Harman – cover of Interzone 179
- 2003: Colin Odell – cover of The True Knowledge of Ken MacLeod
- 2004: Stephan Martinière – cover of Newton's Wake (US edition)
- 2005: Pawel Lewandowski – cover of Interzone 200
- 2006: Christopher "Fangorn" Baker – 'Angelbot', cover of Time Pieces
- 2007: Andy Bigwood – 'Cracked World', cover of disLocations
- 2008: Andy Bigwood – cover of Subterfuge
- 2009: Stephan Martinière, cover of Desolation Road (US edition)
- 2010: Joey Hi-Fi – cover of Zoo City
- 2011: Dominic Harman - cover of Ian Whates' The Noise Revealed
- 2012: Blacksheep - cover of Adam Roberts's Jack Glass
- 2013: Joey Hi-Fi – cover of Tony Ballantyne's Dream London
- 2014: Tessa Farmer - installation inspired by The Wasp Factory from Iain Banks
- 2015: Jim Burns - cover of Pelquin's Comet
- 2016: Sarah Anne Langton – cover of Lavie Tidhar's Central Station
- 2017: Jim Burns and Victo Ngai
- 2018: Likhain - In the Vanishers’ Palace: Dragon I and II
- 2019: Chris "Fangorn" Baker – cover of Wourism and Other Stories by Ian Whates (Luna Press)
- 2020: Iain Clark - Shipbuilding Over the Clyde - art for Glasgow 2024 WorldCon bid
- 2021: Iain Clark - Glasgow Green Woman - art for Glasgow 2024 WorldCon bid
- 2022: Alyssa Winans - cover of The Red Scholar’s Wake by Aliette de Bodard (Gollancz)
- 2023: Leo Nickolls - cover of The Surviving Sky by Krikita H. Rao (Titan)
- 2024: Jenni Coutts - cover of Nova Scotia Volume 2
- 2025: Nick Wells - 12-book tessellated cover of Fractal Series

== Best Artist/Artwork nominees ==
=== 1979 ===
- Jim Burns
- Chris Foss
- John Harris
- Peter Lord
- Tony Roberts
- Patrick Woodroffe

=== 1980 ===
- Peter Jones
- Brian Bolland
- Carlos Ezquerra
- Peter Goodfellow
- Chris Moore
- Tim White

=== 1981 ===
- Bruce Pennington
- Chris Achilleos
- Pete Lyon
- Chris Moore
- Tim White

=== 1982 ===
- Tim White
- Peter Goodfellow
- Peter Jones
- Bruce Pennington

=== 1983 ===
- Bruce Pennington
- Peter Jones
- Ian Miller
- Tim White

=== 1984 ===
- Jim Burns
- Peter Jones
- Ian Miller
- Bruce Pennington
- Tim White

=== 1985 ===
- Jim Burns
- Peter Jones
- Rodney Matthews
- Ian Miller
- Tim White

...

=== 2009 ===
- Nitzan Klamer - alternate cover for 20,000 Leagues Under the Sea
- Stephen Martinière - cover for Desolation Road by Ian McDonald (Pyr)
- Stephanie Pui-Min Law - Emerald
- Adam Tredowski - cover for Interzone 220
- Adam Tredowski - cover for Interzone 224
- Adam Tredowski - cover for Interzone 225

=== 2010 ===
- Andy Bigwood – cover for Conflicts (Newcon Press)
- Charlie Harbour – cover for Fun With Rainbows by Gareth Owens (Immersion Press)
- Dominic Harman – cover for The Cat's Cradle by Kurt Vonnegut (Gollancz)
- Joey Hi-Fi -cover for Zoo City by Lauren Beukes (Angry Robot)
- Ben Greene – A Deafened Plea for Peace, cover for Crossed Genres 21
- Adam Tredowski – cover for Finch by Jeff VanderMeer (Corvus)

=== 2011 ===
- Dominic Harman - cover for Ian Whates' The Noise Revealed (Solaris)
- Jim Kay - cover and illustrations of Patrick Ness' A Monster Calls (Walker)
- Pedro Marques - cover for Lavie Tidhar's Osama (PS Publishing)
- Anne Sudworth - cover for Liz Williams' A Glass of Shadow (Newcon Press)

=== 2012 ===
- Ben Baldwin - cover for Dark Currents (Newcon Press)
- Blacksheep - cover for Adam Roberts' Jack Glass (Gollancz)
- Dominic Harman - cover for Eric Brown's Helix Wars (Rebellion)
- Joey Hi-Fi - cover for Simon Morden's Thy Kingdom Come (Jurassic London)
- Si Scott - cover artwork for Chris Beckett's Dark Eden (Corvus)

=== 2013 ===
- Joey Hi-Fi - cover for Tony Ballantyne's Dream London (Solaris)
- Kevin Tong - poster for Metropolis (tragicsunshine.com)
- Richard Wagner - The Angel at the Heart of the Rain (Interzone #246)

=== 2014 ===
- Tessa Farmer - The Wasp Factory
- blacksheep-uk - cover for Bête by Adam Roberts
- Andy Potts - cover for Mars Evacuees by Sophia McDougall
- Richard Anderson - cover for The Mirror Empire by Kameron Hurley
- Jeffrey Alan Love - cover for Wolves by John Fleskes

...

=== 2018 ===
- Ben Baldwin - wraparound cover for Strange Tales slipcase set (NewCon Press)
- Joey Hi-Fi - cover for Paris Adrift by E.J. Swift (Solaris)
- Sarah Anne Langton - cover for Unholy Land by Lavie Tidhar (Tachyon)
- Sing Yun Lee & Morris Wild - artwork for Sublime Cognition conference (London Science Fiction Research Community)
- Likhain - “In the Vanishers’ Palace: Dragon I and II” (Inprnt)
- Bede Rogerson - cover for Concrete Faery by Elizabeth Priest (Luna Press)
- Del Samatar - artwork for Monster Portraits by Del Samatar & Sofia Samatar (Rose Metal)
- Charlotte Stroomer - cover for Rosewater by Tade Thompson (Orbit Books)

=== 2019 ===
- Aitch & Rachel Vale – cover for Deeplight by Frances Hardinge (UK edition) (Macmillan Children’s Books)
- Chris Baker (Fangorn) – cover for Wourism and Other Stories by Ian Whates (Luna Press)
- Julia Lloyd – cover for Fleet of Knives by Gareth L Powell (Titan Books)
- Charlotte Stroomer – cover for The Rosewater Redemption by Tade Thompson (Orbit Books)
- Richard Wagner – cover for Interzone 284

=== 2020 ===
- Chris Baker (Fangorn) - covers for Robot Dreams series (NewCon Press)
- Iain Clark - Shipbuilding Over the Clyde art for Glasgow 2024 WorldCon bid
- Ruby Gloom - cover for Club Ded by Nikil Singh (Luna Press)
- Sinjin Li - cover for A Strange and Brilliant Light by Eli Lee (Jo Fletcher Books)
- Nani Walker - Four Black Lives Matter Murals (Los Angeles Times)

=== 2021 ===
- Iain Clark - Glasgow Green Woman art for Glasgow 2024 WorldCon bid
- Elena Betti - cover for Saving Shadows by Eugen Bacon (NewCon Press)
- Maria Spada - cover of The Year’s Best African Speculative Fiction edited by Oghenechovwe Donald Ekpeki
- Peter Lo/Kara Walker - cover of Danged Black Thing by Eugen Bacon (Transit Lounge Publishing)
- Dan Dos Santos/Lauren Panepinto - cover of Son of the Storm by Suyi Davies Okungbowa (Orbit)

=== 2022 ===
- Alyssa Winans - Cover of The Red Scholar’s Wake by Aliette de Bodard (Gollancz)
- Vincent Sammy - Cover of ParSec 4, “The Hermit”
- Miguel Co - Cover of Vida Cruz-Borja’s Song of the Mango and Other New Myths (Ateneo De Manila UP)
- Manzi Jackson - Cover of Sheree Renée Thomas, Oghenechovwe Donald Ekpeki, and Zelda Knight (ed.)’s Africa Risen: A New Era of Speculative Fiction (Macmillan)
- Jay Johnstone - Cover of Lorraine Wilson’s The Way the Light Bends (Luna Press Publishing)
- Chris Baker (Fangorn) - Cover of Shoreline of Infinity 32

=== 2023 ===
- Elena Betti - Cover of Danged Black Thing by Eugen Bacon (Apex)
- Christine Kim - Cover of Jewel Box by E. Lily Yu (Erewhon Books)
- Vinayak Varma - Illustrations for Strung Along in Seaforth (Interzone 295)
- Juliana Pinho - Cover art of The Alphabet of Pinaa: An AI Reinvents Zerself on an Inhabited Moon (Interzone Digital)
- Leo Nickolls - Cover of The Surviving Sky by Kritika H. Rao (Titan Books)
- Julia Lloyd - Cover of Descendent Machine by Gareth L. Powell (Titan Books)

=== 2024 ===
...

=== 2025 ===
- Spencer Fuller - Cover of The River Has Roots (Arcadia/Hachette)
- Jenni Coutts - Cover of Dark Crescent (Luna Press Publishing)
- Sam Gretton - Cover of The Salt Oracle (Solaris)
- Jenni Coutts - Mushroom Fairy
- Nick Wells - 12-book tessellated cover of Fractal Series (Flame Tree Press)
- Tziano Zhou - Highway Above the Clouds
