= The Taggerung =

2001 fantasy novel by Brian Jacques

- UK first edition cover
- Author: Brian Jacques
- Illustrator: Peter Standley
- Cover artist: Chris Baker
- Language: English
- Series: Redwall
- Release number: 14
- Genre: Animal/Fantasy
- Publisher: Hutchinson (UK) & Philomel (US)
- Publication date: 2001
- Publication place: United Kingdom
- Media type: Print (hardback and paperback)
- Pages: 384 (UK Hardback) and 438 (US Hardback)
- ISBN: 0-09-176928-0 (UK Hardback) & ISBN 0-399-23720-8 (US Hardback)
- OCLC: 52838753
- Dewey Decimal: [Fic] 21
- LC Class: PZ7.J15317 Tag 2001b
- Preceded by: Lord Brocktree
- Followed by: Triss

The Taggerung is a fantasy novel by Brian Jacques, published in 2001. It is the 14th book in the Redwall series.

== Plot summary ==
His birth was a long-awaited legend full of mystery and promise, among the outlaw Juska tribes along the western shore. Denoted by a unique mark on his right paw, the Taggerung is a fearsome fighter (In the story, the word 'Taggerung' literally means a warrior of unbeatable strength, courage, and savagery), a warrior the likes of which has not been seen for many seasons.(Sawney Rath's father was the most recent). When a seer from one tribe predicted his birth at Redwall Abbey, Sawney Rath the ferret, leader of the Juskarath, sets out to capture the Taggerung.

In Mossflower Woods, Rillflag, a European otter from Redwall is completing a birth ritual with his newborn son, Deyna, when Sawney Rath and his tribe of vermin ambush him. Vallug Bowbeast, a deadly ferret archer of the Juska Tribe murders Rillflag and captures the legendary infant. Sawney renames the young otter Zann Juskarath Taggerung or "Tagg" for short, determined to raise him as his own son, and to bring the Taggerung under his control.

US cover of Taggerung depicting Tagg with an Icelandic tail-cap

As Tagg begins to grow older, he finds himself at odds with his fellow tribe members. He refuses to become violent and soon finds himself as the only member of the tribe who has never killed for fun, or at all. When Sawney orders him to skin a runaway red fox named Felch, Tagg refuses, enraging Sawney. Finding the roles reversed, Tagg flees and finds himself pursued by the ferret leader of the Juskarath.

Unfortunately for Rath, his chase is short-lived, as he is soon murdered by the ambitious stoat Antigra with a slingstone. Antigra hates Sawney Rath because she wishes her son, Gruven to be named as the Taggerung, and because of that, Sawney Rath had killed her husband. Sawney's death enables her bumbling son Gruven Zann to take control of the newly renamed Juskazann tribe. The vixen seer Grissoul tells Gruven he must hunt down the former Taggerung and bring back his head. Only then will some other ambitious Juska warriors accept him as their leader. To aid him in his quest, Gruven recruits a small band of vermin including Vallug Bowbeast, the deadly assassin, and Eefera, a high-ranking weasel, to continue the hunt for the Taggerung. Unfortunately for Gruven, his band of vermin would rather kill him than follow his orders, if only the opportunity presented itself. They are too accustomed to following Sawney's orders to listen to the newly appointed chief.

Tagg runs away to find a pear tree, which he eats from and is reprimanded by two voles. They decide he will not hurt them and invite him back to their home to eat stew and meet their nice friends. He enjoys this very much and would love to stay, but he knows that the Juskarath are chasing him. He bids them a bittersweet goodbye and sets off in a boat they give him.

In his travels, Tagg befriends a similarly mysterious (and, unlike Tagg, prone to telling lies) Eurasian harvest mouse named Nimbalo the Slayer, by saving him from a deadly snake from the mountains. Finding themselves in the company of a Eurasian pygmy shrew colony, they rest until they are attacked by Gruven and his slowly-diminishing band of vermin. Gruven and his band start a landslide, killing and burying many pygmy shrews. As Tagg chases the attackers of his newfound companions, the vermin scatter, leaving only one unfortunate member behind. Under the harsh gaze of Tagg, and the threat of being thrown to the pygmy shrews who lost loved ones in the landslide, the long-time member of Rath's old tribe reveals all, including the name of Tagg's true home: Redwall Abbey.

At the same time, Eefera the weasel and Vallug Bowbeast, the most rebellious and intelligent vermin under Gruven's command, decide to desert Gruven, deciding that he and the other two remaining hordebeasts would die in the mountain. They, being better trackers than Gruven, decide to follow the Taggerung and kill him, to bring his head back to the tribe and claim leadership over the Juskas. But they are both silently trying to find an opportunity to kill each other as well; Vallug is the more dangerous as a killer, but Eefera is a better tracker and more cunning.

When Tagg arrives at Redwall, he's mistaken for one of the members of the band of Juska supposed to be hunting him, knocked out and locked up in the cellars. He's then released on impulse by the assistant cook Broggle when the Juska, Eefera and Vallug, who have now captured Gruven and the other vermin, are threatening to kill Nimbalo, but then their plans go wrong. Tagg goes out to fight, and slays Vallug and Eefera, at the same time getting shot with an arrow by Vallug Bowbeast while Nimbalo goes after another rat. Then, Filorn, Tagg's mother, recognises her son. Cregga Rose Eyes, the ancient blind badgermum, after being shot in the chest with an arrow (by accident), appoints Deyna's sister, Mhera, as the new Abbess of Redwall, succeeding the now deceased Abbess Songbreeze, and then dies shortly after. Rukky Garge, a local otterfixer, manages to remove the distinguishing mark of the Taggerung from Deyna's paw, remove his tattoos, and remove the arrow.

Deyna's quest is not quite over, however, as the fox Ruggan Bor, now commanding the remnants of the Juskazann tribe as well as followers of his own, the Juskabor, shortly arrives to attack the stronghold of Redwall Abbey. Due to Gruven's bragging on his return, they now believe the Taggerung is dead and seek to confirm this rumour. As chance may have it, however, the badger ruler of Salamandastron, Russano the Wise, arrives in time to fend off Bor's attack, sending him and his vermin crew crawling on their bellies off into the sunset. Russano then takes a medal from around his neck and drapes it over Cregga Rose Eyes's grave, as she was his adoptive mother many seasons before this terrible battle happened. This had been his reason for travelling to Redwall in the first place.

== Characters in The Taggerung ==
- Deyna, the Taggerung
- Sawney Rath
- Rillflag
- Ribrow
- Felch
- Filorn
- Antigra
- Gruven Zann
- Grissoul
- Nimbalo the Slayer
- Cregga Rose Eyes
- Mhera
- Vallug Bowbeast
- Ruggan Bor
- Russano the Wise
- Milkeye
- Eefera
- Rawbak
- Dagrab
- Boorab the Fool
- Broggle
- Fwirl
- Friar Bobb
- Gundil
- Sister Alkanet
- Brother Hoben
- Rukky Garge
- Skipper of Otters
- Jurkin Dillypin
- Botarus, a Eurasian bittern
- Brother Egburt
- Brull, the first and only female Foremole of the series
- Poskra
- Drogg Spearback
- Durby Furrel
- Rawback
- Ruskem
- Feegle
- Friar Broggle
- Sister Floburt
- Sister Rosabel, Broggle and Fwirl's daughter who wrote the story
- Great Aunt Lollery
- Gruven I, Antigra's husband
- Hoarg
- Wegg
- Yo Karr, a giant eel

== Translations ==
- (French) Rougemuraille : Le Prodige
- (Russian) "Талисман из Редволла"

Preceded by Marlfox	Redwall series (chronological order)	Succeeded by Triss
Preceded by Lord Brocktree	Redwall series (publication order)	Succeeded by A Redwall Winter's Tale
