= Salamandastron =

1992 fantasy novel by Brian Jacques

- UK first edition cover
- Author: Brian Jacques
- Illustrator: Gary Chalk
- Cover artist: Chris Baker
- Language: English
- Series: Redwall
- Release number: 5
- Genre: Fantasy novel
- Publisher: Hutchinson (UK); Philomel Books (US)
- Publication date: 1992
- Publication place: United Kingdom
- Media type: Print (hard and paperback)
- Pages: 336 (UK hardback) & 391 (US hardback)
- ISBN: 0-09-176433-5 (UK Hardback) & ISBN 0-399-21992-7 (US Hardback)
- OCLC: 26764980
- Preceded by: Mariel of Redwall
- Followed by: Martin the Warrior

Salamandastron /ˌsæləmənˈdæstrən/ is a fantasy novel by Brian Jacques, published in 1992. It is the fifth book published and eighth chronologically in the Redwall series.

== Plot introduction ==
Ferahgo the Assassin, a terrible weasel warlord, and his son Klitch lead their army of Corpsemakers to Salamandastron, to take over from the Badger Lord, Urthstripe the Strong. Meanwhile, at Redwall Abbey, two stoats run off with the Sword of Martin the Warrior after accidentally killing Brother Hal with a bow and arrow left out from a carnival the night before, and young Samkim, a mischievous squirrel, and his partner Arula the molemaid set off to claim back the sword. As the young squirrel and mole attempt to restore the symbolic weapon, a deadly fever ravages Redwall Abbey. The only hope to stop the disease is an otter named Thrugg and his partner, young Dumble the dormouse. At the same time, Mara the badgermaid leaves Salamandastron with Pikkle Ffolger, her friend the gluttonous hare, only to be tricked by Feragho's son Klitch and his lackey, Goffa. The two join forces with the Guerilla Union of South Stream Shrews of Mossflower (Guosssom) to take the Blackstone from the mysterious badger ghost.

== Plot summary ==
The book follows the tale of the Badger Lord Urthstripe the Strong and his battle against Ferahgo the Assassin the least weasel. Mara, Urthstripe's young adopted daughter, and her hare friend, Pikkle, befriend Klitch, a young weasel, and Goffa, a ferret. They invite the two into Salamandastron but they are made to leave the following morning, after which Mara and Pikkle decide to leave the great mountain stronghold, Mara especially having become tired of the strict ways of Salamandastron.

Meanwhile, two stoats, named Dingeye and Thura, have recently deserted Ferahgo's army and are unbeknownst to them are being tracked by a group of six vermin from the horde, led by a fox, Dethbrush. They manage to find their way to Redwall Abbey and are taken in by the kind beasts that reside there. While tensions mount as to their presence, the ruling beasts of the Abbey decide they may stay: the two stoats, while uncouth, have done no harm.

Mara and Pikkle, meanwhile, follow Goffa and Klitch, who turns out to be the son of Ferahgo. They are nearly led into a trap but are saved by Sergeant Sapwood, who was sent by Urthstripe to follow them. They are ambushed by Ferahgo's horde, but escape, taking refuge in a cave. Unfortunately, the cave is inhabited by a sand lizard called Swinkee. A fight ensues, and Mara accidentally pulls off Swinkee's tail. After the fight, Mara and Pikkle ask Swinkee if he can take them to Salamandastron. To get Swinkee to do it, they promise him a large bag of live swampflies and marshworms. Swinkee double-crosses them, however, and leads them straight to a tribe of cannibal toads. They are presented to the chieftain, a large, repulsive, fat toad called King Glagweb. He throws them into a pit where 36 young shrews are kept captive as well, one of these is Nordo, son of Log-a-Log of the Guosssom (Guerilla Union Of South Stream Shrews of Mossflower). The shrews explain what the toads are going to do to them and their escape plan.

Later, when they are nearing a feast day, a black acorn drops into the pit, signalling the captives to throw whatever they have at the toads. After a few minutes of hard fighting, Log-a-Logs shrews come and free the captives while fighting and killing the toads. Mara attacks Glagweb, only to be stopped by Log-a-Log, who throws Glagweb into the prison pit, along with a large, healthy, young pike. Later, Log-a-Log asks a boon of Pikkle and Mara, asking them help in retrieving the Blackstone, the symbol of leadership among the Guosssom. He explains he had been ruling only through sheer strength, and that a badger ghost had taken the stone. The trip to the island was treacherous because of the appearance of the Deepcoiler, a large monster residing in the lake that terrorises the Guosssom, along with a conspiracy against Log-a-log launched by a shrew named Tubgutt, whose life is saved by Mara when the Deepcoiler attacks them. Tubgutt apologizes to Mara, and pledges to always assist her for saving his life. When Mara and Pikkle and the Guosssom reach the island, they delve into the islands forest, meeting the 'ghost' badger, who is really a living badger named Urthwyte, the long-lost brother of Mara's father, Urthstripe, and Urthstripes' grandmother and Mara's great-grandmother, Loambudd. Loambudd tells them of how Ferahgo the Assassin, years ago, had murdered Urthound and Urthrun while she was out collecting berries, Urthound telling her to do so not wanting her to be present at what he thought would be a peace conference with Ferahgo. When Loambudd returned, Urthstripe was missing.

Back at Salamandastron, the hordes of Ferahgo have begun to clash with Urthstripe. Throughout the conflict, Klitch and Ferahgo frequently argue with one another, Klitch complaining of Ferahgo's old age and Ferahgo pointing out Klitch's naivete, both nitpicking each other's methods of invading Salamandastron. Ferahgo decides to secretly send in a fox, Farran the Poisoner, to poison the food and water supplies in the mountain. Later, he also discovers a closed-off kitchen outlet, where he has his horde use to tunnel into Salamandastron.

In the mountain, Farran is able to cause the death of two hares: one which he stabs with a poison dagger after accidentally running into her, one who died quickly because Farran had accidentally put too much poison into the food in the kitchen. Because of this overdose, Urthstripe knows that the food and water have been poisoned, and eventually corners Farran in the lower tunnels, where he kills him by force-feeding him his deadly substances. His dead body is put up against the closed kitchen outlet, where the digging noises were heard by a couple of hares. Ferahgo discovers the body as they are just about to break into the mountain, and while they are screaming in terror at the unexpected sight of the corpse, Urthstripe pours boiling water into the tunnel, burning Ferahgo and killing thirty of his soldiers.

Klitch takes over while Ferahgo recovers from his injuries, and he takes two hares hostage that night. As he does this, two soldiers plot to assassinate Ferahgo. However, Ferahgo predicts this and tricks them into killing a rat in his horde instead of him, and proceeds to kill both of them. Later the next day, the hostages Klitch took manage to escape.

US cover

Meanwhile, a young squirrel named Samkim and his good mole friend Arula are wreaking havoc, as will happen with youngbeasts. They start playing with bows and arrows and frighten one of the Redwall abbey dwellers. One night, after the Abbey celebrates the naming of that summer as The Summer of the Lazy Trout, a lightning bolt strikes the weathervane of Redwall, and the sword of Martin the Warrior falls from its resting place high above the Abbey grounds and falls at the feet of Samkim, who is dumbfounded by his discovery.

Dingeye and Thura's stay is cut short when they are forced to flee the Abbey after accidentally killing one of the Redwallers (Brother Hal) with the same bows and arrows that Samkim and Arula had used. Dingeye and Thura head towards the countryside, with Martin's stolen sword in hand. Samkim and Arula pursue the two beasts, intent on not only rescuing the legendary sword of their Abbey Champion, but exacting vengeance upon the murdering vermin. Thura falls dead from Dryditch fever, and is left behind by Dingeye. His body is discovered by Samkim, Furgle the Hermit, and Arula. Furgle recognises the disease symptoms and goes to warn Redwall. Dingeye, however, is caught by the small group led by Dethbrush, and is beheaded with the Sword of Martin the Warrior. Dethbrush takes the Sword from Dingeye's headless carcass.

Back at Redwall, a terrible disease has begun ravaging the Abbey. Furgle the Hermit determines that it is Dryditch Fever. Mrs. Faith Spinney mentioned that there is an old wives' tale saying that the Flowers of Icetor from the Mountains of the North boiled in springwater can cure Dryditch Fever, so the brave otter Thrugg sets off to find them. With the dormouse babe Dumble along for the ride and an injured falcon whom they meet on the road named Rocangus, the trio eventually makes it to the pines where a group of crows terrorise any passerby. After being rescued by Laird MacTalon and a group of falcons, Thrugg succeeds in securing the flowers from the ruler of the mountain: the mighty golden eagle, Wild King MacPhearsome.

Samkim and Arula meet Spriggat, a bug-eating hedgehog, and Alfoh, an old shrew leader before they sail out onto the Big Inland Lake. They catch up with Dethbrush in a storm and Samkim punches him overboard. He is in turn eaten by the Deepcoiler. Samkim grabs the Sword of Martin the Warrior from the body of Dethbrush before the Deepcoiler can dive. Then, after the Deepcoiler dove, it rose again, attacking Spriggat. Then, when the serpent has Spriggat in its jaws, Samkim stabs the Deepcoiler in the roof of the mouth. The serpent then vanishes. Later, Mara and the Guosim find the body of Deepcoiler and retrieve the Sword from it. Along their way, they meet each other and Mara gives Samkim the Sword.

Heading back to Salamandastron, the group arrives to see Salamandastron being sieged by Ferahgo the Assassin. Before their arrival, Urthstripe had challenged Ferahgo and Klitch to a duel and nearly defeated them before Ferahgo's horde intervened, suffering heavy losses but inflicting severe injuries on Urthstripe. When an entrance is opened as the hares try to take Urthstripe to safety to tend to his wounds, Klitch points out the opportunity and the horde enters the mountain. Mara, Samkim, and company all arrive in time to aid the forces of Salamandastron, and in the ensuing battle, Urthstripe, seized by the Bloodwrath, saves Urthwyte's life but is lethally stabbed. Before he dies, he leaps from the towering mountain with Ferahgo in his grasp, killing them both. After the battle, Ferahgo's son, Klitch, is still trapped within Salamandastron. After wandering some way, he gets thirsty and thinks that it is his 'Lucky Day' when he finds some barrels of water. He has forgotten the fact that Farran the Poisoner, hired by Ferahgo, has poisoned all the food and water he saw while on his last mission before his death. Klitch drinks the dregs, and is eventually beset by lances of pain and numbness. He wedges himself on a mountainside opening, and dies of the powerful poison. After Urthstripe's death, Mara, Pikkle, Samkim, Arula, Urthwyte and Loambudd find the badger treasure that Ferahgo was looking for and bury him there.

Soon after Thrugg, Dumble and MacPhearsome return with the haversack full of the flowers of Icetor, Samkim and Arula, along with Mara and Pikkle, return to Redwall Abbey. The Abbey is cured of the fever and soon, another nameday comes upon the abbey. Mara becomes the Badger Mother of Redwall. Urthwyte remains behind as Lord of Salamandastron, along with the surviving members of the Long Patrol.

== Characters ==
- Urthstripe the Strong
- Ferahgo the Assassin
- Burrley
- Mara
- Drooney
- Wild King MacPhearsome
- Urthwyte the Mighty
- Loambudd
- Tubgutt
- Dingeye
- Thura
- Furgle the Hermit
- Mrs. Faith Spinney
- The Long Patrol
  - Windpaw
  - Big Oxeye (Lieutenant)
  - Sergeant Sapwood
  - Bart Thistledown
  - Moonpaw
  - Seawood
  - Shorebuck
  - Starbob
  - Catkin
  - Pennybright
  - Lingfur
  - Barfle
- Migroo
- Raptail
- Dethbrush
- Brother Hal
- Thrugg
- Thrugann
- Ashnin
- Clarissa
- Baby Dumble
- Brother Hollyberry
- Farran the Poisoner
- Log-a-Log
- Nordo (Log-a-Log's son)
- Sister Nasturtium
- Bremmun
- Arula
- Samkim
- King Glagweb
- Goffa
- Mr. Tudd Spinney
- Swinkee
- Clarence
- Sickear
- Alfoh
- Abbess Vale
- Forgrin
- Laird Mactalon
- Tammbeak
- Crows
- Rocangus
- Burrem
- Pikkle Ffolger
- Spriggat
- Deepcoiler, a giant serpent
- Turzel
- Friar Bellows
- Goffa

== Book divisions (English) ==
- Book 1: Questors and Runaways
- Book 2: Warriors and Monsters
- Book 3: Destinies and Homecomers

== Translations ==
- (Finnish) Salamandastronin aarre
- (French) Rougemuraille : Salamandastron
  - Tome 1 : Ferrago l'Assassin
  - Tome 2 : La Fièvre du fossé tari
  - Tome 3 : Le Serpentissime
  - Tome 4 : Mara de Rougemuraille
- (German) Die Jagd nach dem Schatz
  - Von Abenteurern und Ausreißern
  - Von Kriegern und Ungeheurern
  - Von Shicksalen und Heimkehrern
- (Russian) old version – Мара, или Война с Горностаем, new version – Саламандастрон
  - Беглецы и искатели
  - Воины и чудовища
  - Живые и мертвые

Preceded by The Bellmaker	Redwall series (chronological order)	Succeeded by Redwall
Preceded by Mariel of Redwall	Redwall series (publication order)	Succeeded by Martin the Warrior
