= The Legend of Luke =

Children's fantasy novel by Brian Jacques

- UK first edition cover
- Author: Brian Jacques
- Cover artist: Chris Baker
- Language: English
- Series: Redwall
- Release number: 12
- Genre: Fantasy
- Publisher: Hutchinson (UK) & Philomel (US)
- Publication date: 1999
- Publication place: United Kingdom
- Media type: Print (hardback and paperback)
- Pages: 374 (UK Hardback) & 374 (US Hardback)
- ISBN: 0-09-176862-4 (UK Hardback) & ISBN 0-399-23490-X (US Hardback)
- OCLC: 41645963
- Preceded by: Marlfox
- Followed by: Lord Brocktree

The Legend of Luke is a fantasy novel by Brian Jacques, published in 1999. It is the 12th book and fourth chronologically in the Redwall series.

== Plot summary ==
The book begins during the construction of Redwall Abbey, when a roving female hedgehog named Trimp visits the abbey and sings a song to help the workers lifting a beam. Martin the Warrior recognises his father, Luke the Warrior, mentioned in the lyrics and asks Trimp more about him. He decides to go on a quest to learn more about his father. Martin, Gonff the Mousethief, Dinny, and Trimp befriend an orphaned woodlander squirrel named Chugger, the Eurasian goshawk Krar Woodwatcher, as well as two brother otters, Folgrim (who is very close to becoming feral, having filed his teeth to points, and even eating vermin after he kills them) and his older brother Tungro. When they reach the northlands, Martin meets his father's friends: the old mouse, Vurg, and Beauclair Fethringsol Cosfortingham, an exuberant old hare. They show him a book titled In the Wake of the Red Ship, an account of Luke's life.

US cover of The Legend of Luke

The plot then flashes back to Martin's birth to Luke and Sayna. Luke was the leader of a tribe of mice who lived an idyllic life for many seasons until Vilu Daskar, the murderous captain of the pirate ship Goreleech, attacked the settlement and killed Sayna, as well as many others with his Sea Rogues. Luke vowed revenge upon Daskar and soon had an opportunity when Reynard Chopsnout, pirate captain of the Greenhawk, sailed in, hoping to fix his broken vessel. Luke and his tribe slew Chopsnout and his crew and captured the ship. Together with Vurg, Beau, and others, they sailed off. Martin, now older, wished to accompany his father, but Luke declined, giving Martin his sword, and the chance to name the ship, which he dubbed Sayna.

The account of Luke's life contains the scene where Luke gives his sword to his son. The same scene occurs in the beginning of Martin the Warrior, when Martin receives a flashback of his childhood, as he was captured and put out for the seagulls by Badrang the Tyrant. Therefore, the events in part two of The Legend of Luke occurred around the same time as Martin the Warrior.

At one point, Beau was believed to be dead, but survived. Luke, however, was captured and forced into slavery by Daskar when the Sayna was destroyed. He befriended a black squirrel, Ranguvar Foeseeker, who also wanted her revenge. Luke was quite a bit like his son. For instance, he threatened to strangle the slavedriver; similarly, Martin tried to choke a Marshank hordebeast with the creature's own whip. Luke was able to convince Daskar that he knew the location of a hidden treasure that only he could steer to. Vurg and Beau sneaked aboard to free the slaves as Ranguvar and Luke killed foebeasts. Initially planning to run the ship aground where his tribe could join the fight to take the ship, upon realising his tribe had abandoned the area, Luke ordered the slaves to take the ship, trapped Daskar at one end of the ship, then smashed it against two rocks, breaking it. The ship's stern sinks instantly and Luke, Ranguvar, Daskar, and much of the vermin crew upon it were drowned. The bow becomes stuck between the two rocks and the surviving vermin are massacred by the liberated slaves.

Beau and Vurg presented Martin with a tapestry of his grandfather, also named Martin, which looked a lot like Martin himself. They returned to Redwall, and Martin allegedly chose to put down his sword and live a life of peace. The tapestry Martin received was later made into part of the large tapestry that hangs in the Abbey throughout the Redwall series.

== Characters in The Legend of Luke ==
- Martin the Warrior
- Luke the Warrior
- Gonff the Mousethief
- Columbine
- Abbess Germaine
- Bella of Brockhall
- Dinny
- Krar Woodwatcher
- Folgrim and Tungro
- Beauclair Fethringsol Cosfortingham (Beau)
- Vilu Daskar
- Ranguvar Foeseeker
- Reynard Chopsnout
- Ferdy Stickle and Coggs Stickle
- Young Dinny
- Log a Log Furmo
- Kweekum, a dolphin
- Lady Amber
- Bolwag, a sea lion
- Brango
- Bullflay
- Chugger
- Riddig
- Sayna, Luke's wife and Martin's mother
- Sholabar
- Fripple
- Vurg
- Gonff II (Gonflet)
- Skipper Warthorn
- Honeysuckle, Furmo's wife
- Windred, Martin's grandmother
- Jiddy

== Book divisions (English) ==
- Book 1: Martin
- Book 2: Luke
- Book 3: A Warrior's Legacy

== Translations ==
- (French) Rougemuraille : Le Guerrier disparu
- (Italian) La Leggenda di Luca
- (Russian) Легенда о Льюке

| Preceded by Mossflower | Redwall series (chronological order) | Succeeded by Outcast of Redwall |
| Preceded by Marlfox | Redwall series (publication order) | Succeeded by Lord Brocktree |
