= Redwall Friend & Foe =

- First US Edition Cover
- Author: Brian Jacques
- Illustrator: Chris Baker
- Cover artist: Chris Baker
- Language: English
- Series: Redwall
- Genre: Fantasy
- Publisher: Red Fox (UK) & Philomel (US)
- Publication date: 2000
- Publication place: United Kingdom
- Media type: Print (Hardback & Paperback)
- Pages: 24
- ISBN: 0-09-926425-0 (UK Paperback) & ISBN 0-399-23589-2 (US Hardback)
- OCLC: 44852410
- Preceded by: Redwall Map & Riddler

Redwall Friend & Foe was published in 2000 as an accessory to the Redwall series by Brian Jacques.

== Summary ==
This guide features art by Chris Baker and contains descriptions of Redwall heroes and villains. It also features a pull-out poster and a number of questions to test the reader's knowledge of the series.

== Heroes ==
The heroes featured in the guide are:

- Martin the Warrior
- Luke the Warrior
- Sunflash the Mace
- Mariel Gullwhacker
- Joseph the Bellmaker
- Urthstripe the Strong
- Matthias
- Mattimeo
- Grath Longfletch
- Tamello De Fformelo Tussock (Tammo)
- Dannflor Reguba

== Villains ==
The villains featured in the guide are:

- Badrang the Tyrant
- Tsarmina Greeneyes
- Vilu Daskar
- Swartt Sixclaw
- Gabool the Wild
- Urgan Nagru
- Ferahgo the Assassin
- Cluny the Scourge
- Slagar the Cruel
- Ublaz Mad-Eyes
- Damug Warfang
- Mokkan
