= Mariel of Redwall =

1991 novel by Brian Jacques

- UK first edition cover
- Author: Brian Jacques
- Illustrator: Gary Chalk
- Cover artist: Pete Lyon
- Language: English
- Series: Redwall
- Release number: 4
- Genre: Fantasy novel
- Published: 1991 (Hutchinson (UK) & Philomel (US))
- Media type: Print (hardback and paperback)
- Pages: 390 (UK Hardback) & 387 (US Hardback)
- ISBN: 0-09-176405-X (UK Hardback) & ISBN 0-399-22144-1 (US Hardback)
- OCLC: 24742557
- Preceded by: Mattimeo
- Followed by: Salamandastron

Mariel of Redwall is a fantasy novel by Brian Jacques, published in 1991. It is the fourth book published and also the fourth chronologically in the Redwall series.

== Plot summary ==
US cover of Mariel of Redwall

=== Book 1: The Maid from the Sea ===
The story opens with the Gabool the Wild, the nefarious King of Searats, standing at the top of a cliff, watching a small mousemaid struggling to stay afloat in the rough seas below. The pirate king returned to his fortress, Fort Bladegirt, where one of his captains named Bludrigg demanded a share of their most recent plunder. Gabool feigned an air of compliance, but swiftly beheaded Bludrigg. After this incident, he interrogated Joseph the Bellmaker and attempted to force him to build a tower for the enormous bell he captured. This fails, but Gabool was able to successfully persuade the Bellmaker to interpret the mysterious symbols on the bell in exchange for promises of a reunion with the latter's daughter. Gabool, technically upholding this promise, proceeds to shove the old mouse off of the cliff he had been watching the mousemaid being battered by the sea from before.

In the meantime, the mousemaid was rendered unconscious when a piece of flotsam struck her on the head. But miraculously, she survived, waking up after being washed ashore with a rope looped around her neck. Overwhelmed by thirst, the dazed mousemaid eventually found a small pool of fresh water. After successfully fending off a gull with her trusty rope and unsuccessful attempts to retrieve her forgotten identity, the amnesiac mouse named herself Storm Gullwhacker.

When weary Storm next awoke, she found herself surrounded by trident-wielding common toads, led by their disgruntled leader, Oykamon. The mousemaid launched an attack, but was readily overwhelmed and stabbed. She was rescued by Colonel Clary, Brigadier Thyme, and Hon Rosie, hares of the Long Patrol. They decided to bring Storm to Redwall, led by a reclusive, paranoid Eurasian red squirrel, Pakatugg.

At Terramort Isle, Saltar the corsair, brother of Bludrigg, arrived with the Darkqueen. Saltar dueled Gabool, but was treacherously killed in a trap. Immediately afterward, a report came in that Captain Greypatch had stolen the Darkqueen, Gabool's flagship. Gabool told his captains that whoever kills Greypatch will be made second-in-command of all searats. The power-hungry vermin scrambled to amass crew and ships in a bid to claim the reward.

==== Redwall ====
Storm and Pakatugg quickly found themselves at odds with their disharmonious personalities and they soon parted way. Storm attempted to find the way to Redwall by herself, meeting an eccentric hare named Tarquin L. Woodsorrel.

The two reached Redwall without further incident. Tarquin conversed with the badger mother Mellus while Storm got acquainted with Dandin and Saxtus, two resident mice. Despite the mousemaid's aversion to baths, Storm eventually grew accustomed to life at Redwall. One night, Dandin, Saxtus, and Storm were enjoying themselves at the Abbot's Jubilee Feast when Saxtus recited a strange, prophetic poem. The mousemaid let out a sudden cry and fell unconscious. Unbeknownst to the Redwallers, the story in the poem paralleled the events of Storm's life and triggered the return of her memory.

The blind herbalist, Simeon, convinced Storm to tell them her newly recovered identity. Storm revealed that her real name was Mariel, and recounted her journey aboard the Periwinkle with her father, Joseph the Bellmaker. The Periwinkle was bound on a course for Salamandastron to deliver a massive bell to the current badger lord, Rawnblade Widestripe. Unfortunately, they were overtaken and boarded by a pirate ship under Saltar, who killed the Periwinkle crew after a brief struggle. Joseph and Mariel were taken to Terramort, and she was forced to serve at Gabool's table.

Things went from bad to worse for the mousemaid when she unwittingly collided with Gabool in the midst of a fight the pirate king had picked with another pirate named Skullgor. Gabool finished off Skullgor, then turned his attention to the hapless mousemaid. Mariel snatched up Skullgor's sword from the ground and managed to stun Gabool, but was knocked out by the pirate king's henchmen before she could deal the killing blow. Embarrassed by his unexpected loss to a mere mousemaid, Gabool tied a heavy rock to Mariel's leg and threw her into the sea. Luckily, her would be ball-and-chain was dashed to pieces during her fall and she managed to survive. Eventually waking up with nothing but her trusty rope after having been washed ashore.

==== The Quest Begins ====
Northwest of Redwall, Greypatch landed in Mossflower Woods aboard the Darkqueen, hotly pursued by Garrtail aboard the Greenfang. Greypatch easily massacred the crew of the Greenfang and burned the ship. Pakatugg, spotting the ship, followed the searat scouts, but was captured. When interrogated, the squirrel cracked and revealed the location of Redwall.

Back at Redwall, Mariel attempted to leave immediately in her quest to slay Gabool. Dandin, Mother Mellus, Tarquin, and Simeon were able to convince her to search for information on the whereabouts of Terramort first. All the inhabitants of Redwall searched the gatehouse for clues, unearthing a scroll by Fieldroan the Traveler. Information in hand, Mariel resolved to leave the next day alone. However, Martin the Warrior had other plans. During the night, his spirit visited Simeon and prompted the herbalist to give Dandin his deadly sword.

Early the next morning, Mariel set off as intended, alone, but ran into Tarquin L. Woodsorrel along the path. She insisted that she must make the trip alone, but the hare accompanied her anyway. Not long after, the duo encountered Dandin who had been waiting for them with a full picnic ready. Much to Mariel's chagrin, the party gained yet another member, with the addition of Durry Quill, a Redwall hedgehog. Though furious initially, Mariel finally resigned herself to the fact that the trio was dead-set on accompanying her. The travelers came to a river and were abruptly confronted by a murderous heron named Iraktaan. The travelers' combined efforts were sufficient to subdue the vicious bird. Durry nearly lost his life crossing the pike-infested ford. After a nerve-wracking encounter with an adder and long hours of walking, the four found the "otter and his wife," monolithic sculptures that were mentioned in the Terramort poem.

=== Book 2: The Strange Forest ===
==== The Flitchaye ====
After making their report to Lord Rawnblade, Clary, Thyme, and Rosie investigated the wreck of the Greenfang and traced its destruction to the Darkqueen, which has been left unguarded by Greypatch. Greypatch arrived at Redwall and parleyed with the Abbot in a bid to have the Abbey's gates opened, but was injured by a rock-hard turnip. Fed up with the unpleasantness of their experiences on land since leaving the ship, a crew member named Bigfang inveigles the rest of the crew to abandon Greypatch and return to the '’Darkqueen'’. However, the Darkqueen had been commandeered by the three hares, who loosened a volley of arrows at the searats upon their return. After a long standoff, Kybo the searat convinces the crew to abandon the Darkqueen and return to Greypatch.

Mariel and her companions followed the path and entered a dense forest. In this forest, they detected a strange, cloying smell that induced drowsiness. The party fell asleep, and awoke to find themselves trussed to a tree, surrounded by creatures shrouded in barkcloth and weeds. They had been captured by a tribe of weasels called the Flitchaye and their leader Snidjer. Mariel broke them free of their bonds and beat furiously on the oak until help arrived in the form of a massive barn owl, Stonehead McGurney. The aptly named owl used his head as a battering ram, flinging the hapless weasels over the treetops. After introducing Mariel and company to his savage wife Thunderbeak and their four ravenous chicks, Stonehead offered to take them to the next location, the "swampdark", mentioned in the poem the next morning.

Down south in Salamandastron, Lord Rawnblade was missing. The Waveblade, under Captain Orgeye, was grounded near Salamandastron and the badger lord came out of his mountain to do battle. Full of the Bloodwrath, Rawnblade slew the entire corsair crew singlehandedly and set the ship on a course for Terramort.

==== Swampdark and the Sea ====
Near Redwall, the ship's crew returned to Greypatch, who had formulated a fail-proof plan to take Redwall. Greypatch sent Bigfang to burn the gates with a shield of oarslaves. The pirate Kybo went to the east wall with grappling hooks to mount a surprise attack, while Greypatch's company fired a barrage of projectiles as a distraction. At first, his feint attack appeared to be working and Kybo's crew nearly scaled the east wall unnoticed. Unfortunately for the searats, three naughty Dibbuns equipped with knives appeared and gleefully sliced through the searats' ropes. It was a long drop to the forest floor below...

The Terramort questers were guided to swampdark, where Stonehead left them. The dimly-lit swamp proved treacherous, and Dandin almost lost his life in a bog. Nevertheless, the party finally reached the edge of the swamp, but became aware that they had been followed by a group of silent lizards. Mariel attempted to challenge and intimidate them, but the lizards made no move. The party left the swamp and traversed some hills to reach the coastline. There, they met a kindly old dormouse named Bobbo, who brought them home for tea. After introducing them to his pet newt Firl, Bobbo told them his life story— he was captured by Gabool the Wild and became a galley slave, but was left for dead.

As the rest turned in for the night, Mariel asked Bobbo for directions to Terramort, who told her about a swallow ornament that "cannot fly south", a primitive compass. The next day, Bobbo led them to a deep pool. At the bottom was the swallow, trapped between two rocks and guarded by an enormous lobster. The five animals threw food into the water to satiate the crustacean's appetite, and Mariel and Dandin descended into the murky, forbidding depths to retrieve the swallow.

=== Book 3: The Sound of a Bell! ===
==== The Search for the Swallow ====
After suffering an ignominious defeat, Greypatch hatched a new plan to attack the Abbey: fire-swingers! Greypatch convinced his skeptical crew to create scores of miniature boulders wrapped in flammable substances. Tied to vines and swung like oversized bolas, they made formidable incendiary weapons. Since none of their weapons could match the range of a fire-swinger, the Redwallers were defenceless against the onslaught of missiles. However, Colonel Clary, Brigadier Thyme, and Hon Rosie made their way to the Abbey and constructed special bows out of yew staves. The well-trained hares stood on the Abbey ramparts and fired their far-reaching longbows, felling several of Greypatch's rats. Pandemonium broke out among the searats, and they retreated out of range of the Abbey.

As the creatures of the Abbey put up a valiant defence, Dandin and Mariel encountered unexpected difficulties in their pursuit of the swallow. Dandin, with sword in paw, protected Mariel as she tried to dislodge the swallow. Mariel found that the metal swallow was wedged firmly between two rocks, and her vigorous motions to free it attracted the attention of the lobster. During the frenzied melee, Dandin dropped the Sword of Martin and was immobilized, with the creature's claws at his back.

Mariel caught the sword and dealt the lobster a terrible blow, allowing Dandin to be rescued, hauled up on the rope around his waist. Unfortunately, the lobster wheeled around and locked onto the Sword of Martin. A tug-of-war ensued as Mariel was pulled up by her rope and the lobster clutched doggedly onto the opposite end of the sword. However, it releases its grip after being pelted by several rocks from the surface. Mariel and Dandin gasped for air on the shore, thankful to be alive but despondent at their failure to retrieve the swallow. With a twinkle in his eye, Bobbo handed them the swallow, explaining that Firl retrieved the swallow during the confusion. Bobbo then directed them to the burned out hulk of Greenfang, which remained seaworthy despite the damage. After a tearful farewell, the four questers set sail for Terramort, directed by the magnetic swallow.

In the aftermath of Greypatch's attack, the hares and Mother Mellus discussed strategy. Though Redwall was secure from any pirate assault, Mother Mellus voiced her concern about the mistreated oarslaves held captive by Greypatch. In a commendable show of bravery, Clary readily agrees to do whatever he can to free them.

In the twilight, the three hares embarked on a covert mission to the pirate camp. As the tension mounted, Hon Rosie could not contain her mirth and let off a tremendous “Whoohahahahooh,” her signature, high-decibel laugh. All activity in the searat camp ceased and the hares were forced to flee. However, they managed to rescue two shrews during the turmoil.

Greypatch, infuriated by the incident and ordered tripwires and other traps to be set around the camp perimeter. Upon discovering these devices, Clary had Foremole dig a tunnel to the oarslaves. In the middle of the night, sleepy rats were surprised to see pairs of slaves vanishing straight into the ground. The internal conflict among the searats escalated into a duel for leadership between Bigfang and Greypatch. Greypatch overwhelmed Bigfang, forcing him into a campfire and killing him with a swift spear throw.

==== Diverging Roads to Terramort ====
Meanwhile, the travellers to Terramort were having problems of their own. In the thick fog wreathing the ocean, Mariel and Tarquin were unable to see a large ship bearing down on them. One of Gabool's ships named the Seatalon rammed the Greenfang and all four travellers were thrown into the sea. Dandin and Durry were captured by the pirate ship. Mariel and Tarquin treaded water, using the hare's harolina as a float.

The Seatalon’s captain, Catseyes, took Dandin’s sword for himself and consigned Dandin and Durry to the galleys as oarslaves. The two were treated cruelly by slavemaster Blodge and his puny assistant Clatt, who forced the slaves to row for Terramort. At night, however, a hooded mouse with silvery fur came aboard and handed out files to the slaves. He approached Captain Catseyes, claiming to be a courier from Gabool. The enigmatic mouse slayed Catseyes with a thrust from a dagger, and led a revolt to take over the Seatalon. Only then did he reveal his identity: Joseph the Bellmaker!

As for Mariel and Tarquin, they struggled to stay afloat and held an animated conversation until they are lifted aboard the Waveblade by Lord Rawnblade. They arrayed themselves in the searat regalia and landed at Terramort without being identified, despite a harrowing encounter with two pirate ships.

==== Last Stand of the Long Patrol ====
In the meantime, Colonel Clary, Brigadier Thyme, and the Honorable Rosie had run out of options. With Greypatch reaffirmed as leader, the remaining captive oarslaves and Pakatugg were secured in a cage made of branches. The hares decided that the only way to free the oarslaves would be at the cost of their lives. Heavily armed, they approached Greypatch’s camp and ordered Oak Tom, Treerose, and Rufe Brush to spirit away the oarslaves at their signal.

Upon entering the camp, the hares loosed shaft after shaft into the charging corsairs from their deadly longbows. Clary tossed Pakatugg a knife, and the lean squirrel bravely volunteers to die with the hares. When the hares finally exhausted their supply of arrows, the hares and Pakatugg brandished their lances and charged straight into the middle of the pirate crew with one last cry of “Eulaliaaaa!”

Weeping, the three squirrels made their way to Redwall with the last of the oarslaves. Upon hearing the news of the long patrol's last stand, Mother Mellus and Flagg set out in the direction of the searat camp. They stumbled upon two searats preparing to deal the killing blow to Hon Rosie, but killed them before they had a chance. With the aid of Oak Tom and Rufe Brush, they carried the gravely wounded Hon Rosie to Redwall. Left with eighteen corsairs out of his former hundred, Greypatch finally decided to pack up and return to the Darkqueen.

At Terramort, Gabool and his captains saw the large form of Lord Rawnblade from afar. Three searat crews were dispatched to slay the badger. Once ashore, Rawnblade, Mariel, and Tarquin spotted Dandin and Durry. They met up, with the hordes of searats just behind them, and ran among some large rocks. Durry pushed aside a massive boulder, revealing the tunnel to Joseph's secret hideout.

==== The Final Battle ====
As Durry broke the news to Mariel that her father was alive, the exuberant mousemaid, thrilled beyond measure, snatched the party's sole torch and rushed down the tunnel only to be met with the hundreds of Terramort Resistance Against Gabool fighters. Joseph related his story and the two organised a large army of oarslaves dedicated to the destruction of Terramort.

After an argument over who would be the one to kill Gabool, Joseph uncovered his plan for a three-pronged assault on Fort Bladegirt through several tunnels. Mariel and Joseph would attack the fort from opposite sides as Tarquin battered down the main gates with a ram. Lord Rawnblade planned to break through the walls with a massive boulder and charge in. At first, the plan worked perfectly and the searats were completely caught off guard.

Mariel and Joseph's slingers were cut down by arrow fire, Tarquin provided a loud distraction by ramming the gates. As Gabool fearfully watched the onslaught, Rawnblade entered the battle. Assailed by three searats at once, Joseph would have lost his life were it not for the timely intervention of Mariel's Gullwhacker.

==== Into Gabool's Lair ====
When the path was clear, Dandin, Mariel, Joseph, Durry, and Tarquin rushed into the fort after Rawnblade, who had gone in before them. Rawnblade, full of the bloodwrath, fearlessly banged on Gabool's bell, challenging the pirate king. Gabool thrust a dagger into the badger's chest and quickly retreated further into his lair. Fortunately, Rawnblade's breastplate absorbed the impact. Mariel and the rest arrived as Rawnblade split the door into two halves and set off, hard on the heels of Gabool.

In the meantime, Gabool had set a trap. As his pursuers confronted him, he taunted Rawnblade, who furiously charged toward him. When the badger stepped on a carpet between him and Gabool, he plummeted down into a dark pit. A scorpion, Skrabblag, residing in the pit, quickly moved to attack. The spirit of Martin, however, took control of Rawnblade and prompted the badger to fling the poisonous creature out of the pit and onto the face of Gabool. The scorpion gripping, the searat with its pincers, struck Gabool's head with its lethal stinger. Skrabblag detached himself from Gabool as the former pirate king convulsed and died. Dandin quickly killed the creature before it could do further harm, and the party left Terramort forever.

Durry, Tarquin, Dandin, and Joseph each commandeered one of the abandoned pirate ships, and set sail for Redwall with the Trag warriors and the bell. When they reached their destination, all Redwall came to greet them. An enormous feast was prepared, thereafter known as the Feast of the Bell Rising, so named for Rawnblade's generous gift to the Abbey. Dandin's friend Saxtus became Abbot, and Rufe Brush tied Martin's sword to the roof of the Abbey, where it was later found by Samkim in the book Salamandastron. The famed Gullwhacker became the bellpull for the new Joseph Bell, and its owner accompanied Dandin as they sought out new adventures.

=== Translations ===
The Dutch translation by Annemarie Hormann does not include the final two chapters. Also, due to some alterations to the ending, the heroes never capture the Nightwake, the book ends with three ships sailing away as opposed to the four in the original version.

== Characters in Mariel of Redwall ==
=== Redwallers and companions ===
- Mariel Gullwhacker
- Joseph the Bellmaker
- Rawnblade Widestripe
- Colonel Clary
- Brigadier Thyme
- The Honourable Rosemary (Hon Rosie)
- Dandin
- Saxtus
- Durry Quill
- Rufe Brush
- Tarquin Longleap Woodsorrel
- Pakatugg
- Mother Mellus
- Abbot Bernard
- Simeon the Blind Herbalist
- Oak Tom
- Treerose
- Bagg
- Runn
- Grubb
- Friars Alder & Cockleburr
- Flagg
- Iraktaan
- Bobbo
- Oykamon
- Firl, a pet newt
- Sister Serena
- Skrabblag, a scorpion that served Gabool
- Stonehead McGurney

=== Searats and corsairs ===
- Gabool the Wild
- Orgeye
- Hookfin
- Bluddrigg
- Garrtail
- Riptung
- Skullgor
- Grimtooth
- Saltar
- Greypatch
- Bigfang
- Blodge

=== Gabool's ships and their crews ===
- Waveblade:
  - Orgeye
  - Durry Quill (as the Gabriel)
- Blacksail:
  - Hookfin
  - Tarquin L. Woodsorrel (as the Hon Rosie)
- Rathelm:
  - Flogga
- Greenfang:
  - Bluddrigg
  - Garrtail
- Nightwake:
  - Riptung
  - Dandin (as the Abbot Bernard)
- Seatalon:
  - Catseyes
  - Fishtail
- Crabclaw: (originally Periwinkle)
  - Captain Ash
  - Skullgor
  - Grimtooth
  - Joseph the Bellmaker (under original name)
- Darkqueen:
  - Saltar
  - Graypatch
  - Frink
  - Deadglim
  - Lardgutt
  - Kybo
  - Fishgill
  - Bigfang
  - Reekhide
  - Stumpclaw
  - Shornear

== Book divisions (English) ==
- Book 1: The Maid from the Sea (Chapters 1–18)
- Book 2: The Strange Forest (Chapters 19–26)
- Book 3: The Sound of a Bell! (Chapters 27–42)

== Translations ==
- (Dutch) Mariël
  - Mariël: Het Verlaten Strand
  - Mariël: Het Oneindige Bos
  - Mariël: Eiland Aardedood
- (Finnish) Mariel, taistelija
- (French) Rougemuraille : Mariel
  - Tome 1 : La Révolte de Tempête
  - Tome 2 : Kamoul le Sauvage
  - Tome 3 : La Forêt hostile
  - Tome 4 : À l'assaut de Terramort
- (German) Mariel: Das Geheimnis der Glocke
- (Italian) Mariel di Redwall
- (Spanish) Mariel de Redwall
- (Swedish) Mariel, klockmakarens dotter
- (Russian) old version – Мэриел, new version – Мэриел из Рэдволла

Preceded by Outcast of Redwall	Redwall series (chronological order)	Succeeded by The Bellmaker
Preceded by Mattimeo	Redwall series (publication order)	Succeeded by Salamandastron
