= The Bellmaker =

1994 novel by Brian Jacques

- UK first edition cover
- Author: Brian Jacques
- Illustrator: Allan Curless
- Cover artist: Chris Baker
- Language: English
- Series: Redwall
- Release number: 7
- Genre: Fantasy novel
- Publisher: Hutchinson (UK) and Philomel (US)
- Publication date: 1994
- Publication place: United Kingdom
- Media type: Print (hardback and paperback)
- Pages: 352 (UK hardback); 336 (US hardback)
- ISBN: 0-09-176622-2 (UK hardback); ISBN 0-399-22805-5 (US hardback)
- OCLC: 59815552
- Preceded by: Martin the Warrior
- Followed by: Outcast of Redwall

The Bellmaker is a fantasy novel by Brian Jacques, published in 1994. It is chronologically the seventh book in the Redwall series.

== Plot summary ==
Far away, from across the northern sea, the Foxwolf Urgan Nagru and his wife Silvamord arrive in Southsward, bringing two shiploads of rats and storms the Castle Floret. Nagru, the Foxwolf, captures Gael Squirrelking, his wife Serena, their son Truffen and his nursemaid Muta, a mute badger. Entrance to the castle was gained through Silvamord's deceit in feigning weakness and ill fortune in both herself and Urgan Nagru. She then took Truffen the squirrel babe hostage until the gate was opened to the hordes of awaiting rats.

Meanwhile, Dandin and Mariel Gullwhacker have set out from Redwall Abbey but have found themselves stuck in the southern dunes without food. After befriending a hedgehog named Bowly Pintips, they find themselves attempting to save a mole who happened to be under attack by Nagru's rat troops. Just as the trio of would-be rescuers realise their peril, Field Marshal Meldrum Fallowthorn the Magnificent bounds to their aid, accompanied by his four leveret nephews.

US cover of The Bellmaker

Back in Southsward, Gael's otter allies have begun planning a rescue mission. Led by Rab Streambattle, the otters manage to rescue Serena and Truffen, but Gael and Muta encounter trouble. Unable to escape, Muta and Rab stand their ground against waves of Nagru's rat troops, fighting until they collapse under the innumerable odds, presumed dead.

Dandin, Mariel and Meldrum survive long enough to fend off Nagru's last effort, two of his psychotic tracking ermine, called Dirgecallers, who were unleashed to track down the escape prisoners. Mariel and her companions manage to kill the trackers, allowing Serena and Truffen to escape to safety, but they are not able to avoid Nagru's rat troops, as they are captured and led back to Castle Floret.

Back at Redwall Abbey, Joseph the Bellmaker, the father of Mariel, has a vision. Inspired by Martin the Warrior, the legendary Champion and protector of Redwall, Joseph recruits a hare (The Honourable Rosemary, or Hon Rosie for short), a hedgehog (Durry Quill), a squirrel (Rufe Brush) and the Foremole, the leader of moles. Accompanied by Log-a-Log and a band of Guosim shrews, the band reaches the coast. Intent on finding the place shown to him in his vision, Joseph and his companions befriend Finnbarr Galedeep, a rusky wild sea otter, who helps them deceive searat brothers Slipp and Strapp, stealing the excellent Pearl Queen in the process. Strapp steals the crew of his brother, Slipp and gives chase aboard his ship, the Shalloo, but they are all lost at sea when the ship sinks into a whirlpool called the 'Green Maelstrom'.

As Joseph and company sail towards Castle Floret and Urgan Nagru, Slipp and Blaggut, his good-natured first mate, head into Mossflower Woods.

When they awaken, Mariel, Dandin and Meldrum find themselves in the dungeons of Castle Floret, along with the battered Gael Squirrelking. With a bit of luck and the help of Glokkpod, a shrike, they manage to escape, but Mariel becomes separated from her friends. As she attempts to find safety, Mariel meets Egbert the Scholar, an old mole living beneath Castle Floret, who happened to find Rab and Muta and nursed them back to health. Psychologically damaged from their near-death battle, the two warriors are intense, but refuse to speak. With their help, Mariel finds her way inside the castle and lowers the drawbridge.

At Redwall Abbey, the two rats have arrived and found refuge in the kind, peaceful Abbey. Slipp, after a failed plan to find treasure with a band of Dibbuns, has had enough; he attacks and kills the local Badger Mother, Mellus, and escapes the Abbey with Blaggut and a chalice. After Blaggut learns the truth, he kills his captain and returns to the Abbey with the chalice, seeking forgiveness, which he eventually receives.

On the Pearl Queen, many calamities had befallen the Redwallers and their crew, including whirlpools, sharks, shipwrecked islands, and crazy toads. Hon Rosie and Durry Quill were taken for dead for some time, but showed up in fine form later. Three young orphans are acquired as well: the squirrel Benjy, the mousemaid Wincey, and the little ottermaid Figgs. They eventually arrive at Southsward and, with the help of some clans they meet on the way, arrive at Castle Floret, ready for battle.

A massive battle ensues in which Mariel, Dandin, Meldrum, the otters, Finnbarr, Joseph, and the rest fight Nagru's horde of grey rats, most of which are slaughtered. However, the shrew Fatch, a good friend of Rufe and Durry, is slain by Silvamord. Rab Streambattle, who had recently reunited with his wife Iris and regained his sanity, kills Silvamord in the moat shortly afterward for although she is a mighty warrior, she is unable to swim. In the final battle, Finnbarr Galedeep engages Urgan Nagru and kills him by smashing the fangs of his wolf skull into the top of his head. However, Finnbarr dies from the wounds inflicted during the fight.

With Urgan vanquished and his horde depleted, peace is restored upon Castle Floret and Southsward. Gael is reinstated as Squirrelking of Floret with his family and Muta. While the other Redwallers return to the abbey, Joseph stays in Southsward to help restore order. Mariel, Dandin, and Bowly, their warrior spirits unable to be stilled, take off once more in search of adventure.

== Characters in The Bellmaker ==
- Joseph the Bellmaker
- Abbot Saxtus
- Cap’n Slipp
- Urgan Nagru, the Foxwolf
- Mariel Gullwhacker
- Dandin
- Finnbarr Galedeep
- Silvamord
- Meldrum the Magnificent
- Gael Squirrelking
- Rab & Iris Streambattle
- Mother Mellus
- Blaggut
- Bowly Pintips
- Agric
- Log-a-Log
- Bruggit
- Muta
- Oak Tom
- Queen Serena
- Rufe Brush
- Durry Quill
- Egbert the Scholar
- Spurge
- Strapp
- Foremole
- Furpp Straightfurrer
- Furrtil
- Tarquin Longleap Woodsorrel
- Treerose
- Truffen
- Gawjun
- Glogalog
- Glokkpod, a shrike
- Honorable Rosemary
- Yoghul

== Book divisions (English) ==
- Book 1: The Dream
- Book 2: The Pearl Queen
- Book 3: Southsward

== Translations ==
- (Finnish) Kellonvalaja
- (French) Rougemuraille : Joseph le Fondeur
  - Tome 1 : La Menace d'Ourgan le Garou
  - Tome 2 : La Reine-de-Nacre
  - Tome 3 : Les Évadés de Méridion
  - Tome 4 : La Reconquête
- (German) In den Fängen des Tyrannen
- (Italian) Giuseppe di Redwall
- (Swedish) Josef, klockmakaren
- (Russian) Колокол Джозефа

Preceded by Mariel of Redwall	Redwall series (chronological order)	Succeeded by Salamandastron
Preceded by Martin the Warrior	Redwall series (publication order)	Succeeded by Outcast of Redwall
