= A Redwall Winter's Tale =

2001 novel by Brian Jacques

- First US edition cover
- Author: Brian Jacques
- Illustrator: Christopher Denise
- Cover artist: Christopher Denise
- Language: English
- Series: Redwall
- Genre: Fantasy novel
- Publisher: Hutchinson (UK) & Philomel (US)
- Publication date: 2001
- Publication place: United Kingdom
- Media type: Print (Hardback & Paperback)
- Pages: 64 (UK Hardback) & 72 (US Hardback)
- ISBN: 0-09-176948-5 (UK Hardback) & ISBN 0-399-23346-6 (US Hardback)
- OCLC: 59483065
- Preceded by: The Great Redwall Feast

A Redwall Winter's Tale was written by Brian Jacques and illustrated by the well-known Redwall artist, Christopher Denise.

== Plot introduction ==
A Redwall Winter's Tale is the second Redwall picture book. It features the 'molebabe' Bungo and the inhabitants of Redwall trying to decipher more clever riddles.

== Plot summary ==
A Redwall Winter's Tale opens up on the last day of autumn. At Redwall Abbey, the two Dibbuns (toddlers) Bungo and Tubspike are playing outside, waiting for a group of travelling performers that are expected at the Abbey. The Abbot had given them permission to welcome them.

The performers arrive, enter the abbey, and put on a show. Finally, when it is time for bed, the Dibbuns are told the story of the Snow Badger, a mythical creature who makes the snow fall.

Just before dawn the next morning, the Dibbun mole Bungo sees the Snow Badger and is able to talk to him! When the little mole wakes up, he finds a pouch around his neck. It contains a small crystal drop, and a note is written on the inside of the pouch on a scrap of parchment. It is in the form of a riddle, but what does it mean? The Redwallers must try to figure it out...

== Translations ==
- (French) Rougemuraille : Un conte d'hiver : Le Géant de neige

Preceded by The Taggerung	Redwall Series (publication order)	Succeeded by Triss
