= The Pearls of Lutra =

1996 novel by Brian Jacques

Pearls of Lutra
- UK first edition cover
- Author: Brian Jacques
- Illustrator: Allan Curless
- Cover artist: Chris Baker
- Language: English
- Series: Redwall
- Release number: 9
- Genre: Fantasy novel
- Publisher: Hutchinson (UK) & Philomel (US)
- Publication date: 1996
- Publication place: United Kingdom
- Media type: Print (hardback and paperback)
- Pages: 375 (UK Hardback) & 408 (US Hardback)
- ISBN: 0-09-176536-6 (UK Hardback) & ISBN 0-399-22946-9 (US Hardback)
- OCLC: 43178085
- Preceded by: Outcast of Redwall
- Followed by: The Long Patrol

The Pearls of Lutra (published as Pearls of Lutra, without the definite article, in the US) is a fantasy novel by Brian Jacques, published in 1996. It is the ninth book published and eleventh chronologically in the Redwall series.

== Plot summary ==
When gathering herbs near the quarry in Mossflower Woods, the young Redwallers Tansy the common hedgehog and Arven the Eurasian red squirrel come across a mysterious skeleton among the rocks. They are disoriented in a rainstorm and after failing to return to the abbey before the breaking of the storm are rescued by Martin II the mouse, son of Mattimeo and grandson of Matthias. Tansy quickly leads curious Redwallers back to the quarry to examine the mysterious skeleton, and along the way, they meet two travellers: the irrepressible hare Cleckstarr Lepus Montisle and his western barn owl friend Gerul.

Meanwhile, far across the western sea on the tropical isle of Sampetra, trouble is brewing. Ublaz Mad-Eyes, a large, sinewy European pine marten with a hypnotic stare, gathers an army of barbaric monitor lizards and trident-wielding searats. The stoat captain Conva is sent out to retrieve the Tears of All Oceans, six legendary perfectly spherical rose-pink pearls, but after murdering the members of Holt Lutra—a European otter community that owned the pearls—the Tears are stolen by the least weasel Graylunk, who flees into Mossflower Woods. Conva tracks him to Redwall Abbey, where Graylunk takes refuge, before returning to Sampetra.

US cover of Pearls of Lutra

Ublaz is not pleased and murders Conva. He then sends out an elite force of monitor lizards, headed by their general Lask Frildur, to Mossflower to retrieve the pearls. They are escorted by the ferret captain Romsca and her crew.

However, the daughter of the Lutra chieftain is not dead. Far away on the western shores, Grath Longfletch, a strong female otter, was at the gates of the Dark Forest before being found by a pair of bank voles, who nurse her back to health. The otter fashions a powerful bow and a quiver of green-fletched arrows, with which she planned on wreaking her revenge. She eliminates a longboat-crew of searats and then takes their boat southward into Mossflower, where she hopes to find the corsairs that slew her family.

Presently, Conva's brother Barranca discovers that Ublaz has killed his brother, and he begins hatching a plan to overthrow the pine marten and take the island for himself. With the fearsome Lask and his lizards gone to Mossflower, Barranca decides to seize his chance.

Back at Redwall, the old bankvole recorder Rollo determines that the skeleton in the quarry was Graylunk. He had become gravely injured in a fight with the weasel Flairnose, whom he killed, over the pearls before seeking safety at Redwall. There he befriended an old squirrel called Sister Fermald before he went off to die in the woods. Fermald, a clever, though senile old beast, had expertly hidden the pearls throughout the abbey before dying several seasons ago. Tansy, Rollo, and Martin II, along with the hedgehog maid's friends Craklyn the squirrel and Piknim the mouse, begin a search for the six exquisite pearls. The Dibbun Arven and his two partners in crime, the moles Diggum and Gurrbowl, occasionally help in the search.

When Abbot Durral takes young Viola Bankvole for a stroll in Mossflower Woods, they are captured by Lask and his troops. Lask binds the Abbot and the bankvole and attempts to ransom them for the pearls at Redwall. However, the pearls have not yet been found, and Lask and his lizards take the two Redwallers back to their ship to be captives at Sampetra.

Martin, Clecky, Gerul, and the Skipper of Otters pursue the lizards through Mossflower, slaying several but failing to rescue the captives. Gerul and Skipper become wounded and are sent back to the Abbey, but the others chase the lizards to the western shore. There, they meet up with the GUOSIM and Grath Longfletch, who had caught sight of Romsca's ship, the Waveworm, and attempted to pick off some of the vermin. Durral manages to help Viola get to safety on the shore, but the ship departs before he can escape. Viola is sent back to Redwall with two shrews to guide her, and Grath, Clecky, Martin, and the Log-a-Log's two sons use discarded vermin boats to form the Freebeast, a double-outrigger vessel in which they pursue Lask to Sampetra. Viola, who has sneaked aboard, also ends up coming along.

On Sampetra, Barranca has been slain by Rasconza, a clever fox corsair who takes over the rebellion against Ublaz. Initial attempts at negotiation fail, due to the double-dealing of the pair, and when Ublaz tries to have Rasconza assassinated, Sampetra is plunged into all-out war. Ublaz's trident-rats, led by his general Sagitar, desert him and switch to Rasconza's side, but they are unable to take Ublaz's fortress, which is still held by his monitor lizards. Under siege, Ublaz decides to hold out until Lask Frildur returns with reinforcements.

In the search for the six pearls, the Redwaller friends slowly but surely find them all, though not without paying the price. The young mouse Piknim ends up being slain by the cruel jackdaws at St. Ninian's while searching for a pearl. The church is burnt down to prevent evil-doers from ever using it again (it had been used as a base by Redwall's enemies twice before in Redwall and Mattimeo), and the search resumes, with all the pearls eventually being found.

Martin, Grath and their friends closely follow Romsca and Lask across the ocean, and end up meeting the otters of Holt Ruddaring along the way. Inbar Trueflight, another skilled otter archer, and the seal Hawm tag along on the quest.

On the Waveworm, Durral is underfed and mistreated, but the ferret captain Romsca protects him from the fierce violence and hunger of Lask's cruel monitor lizards. Lask and Romsca, who had been at odds with one another since the beginning, finally battle on deck, with the forces of both being wiped out. Romsca ends up slaying Lask but is fatally injured in the process. Before dying, she gives the Abbot instructions on how to set the rudder to fix the ship toward Sampetra. As the last living creature aboard the ship, the old Abbot sails alone toward the evil isle. By the time the ship arrives, he is so weak from hunger and thirst that he is hallucinating; Ublaz, furious that the reinforcements he was waiting for are dead, takes the Abbot hostage.

When Martin, Clecky, Grath, Inbar, the shrews and Viola arrive on Sampetra, a battle ensues. Suspecting Sagitar and her trident-rats have betrayed him, Rasconza mortally wounds her, but she manages to kill him before dying herself, leaving the corsairs leaderless. Most of the monitor lizards and wave-vermin are killed, and Martin corners Ublaz alone in the caverns below his palace. They duel it out, but after wounding Martin, Ublaz accidentally steps on a poisonous coral snake (which he had hypnotised and kept as a pet to intimidate his enemies). The snake bites him, and he dies.

Durral is rescued and the warriors all return to Mossflower. They leave the island of Sampetra with no timber for ship building to force the vermin to learn to live in harmony with each other. Grath stays with Inbar at Holt Ruddaring, as the pair have fallen in love, but the others meet Tansy and her friends at the shore. The young hedgehog, realising the pearls lead only to greed and violence and bring nothing but misery and death to all who own them, casts them out into the sea to be forever lost. For her hard work, perseverance and aptitude, Tansy is made Abbess of Redwall to succeed old Durral. She becomes the first non-mouse abbot/abbess.

== Characters in The Pearls of Lutra ==
- Tansy
- Arven
- Martin II
- Cleckstarr Lepus Montisle (Clecky)
- Gerul the Owl
- Ublaz Mad-Eyes
- Romsca
- Grath Longfletch
- Fermald the Ancient
- Rollo Bankvole (the same Rollo Bankvole from Mattimeo).
- Craklyn
- Piknim
- Conva
- Barranca
- Rasconza
- Abbot Durral
- Viola Bankvole
- Sagitar Sawfang
- Graylunk
- Hawm the Seal
- Lask Frildur
- Inbar Trueflight
- Bladeribb
- Grall, a seagull
- Gurrbowl
- Blowfly
- Brother Dormal
- Log-a-Log
- Plogg & Welko, shrew brothers
- Rangapaw
- Friar Higgle Stump & Furlo Stump, two sons of Jubilation Stump
- Scruvo, a jackdaw
- Sister Cicely
- Skarbod
- Skipper of otters
- Glenner
- Gowja
- Guja
- Wallyum Rudderwake
- Wullger

== Book divisions (English) ==
- Book 1: Six Tears for an Abbot
- Book 2: Westward the Warriors
- Book 3: When Tears Are Shed

== Translations ==
- (Finnish) Jalokivien jäljillä
- (French) Rougemuraille : Les Perles de Loubia
  - Tome 1 : L'Empereur aux yeux fous
  - Tome 2 : Six larmes pour un abbé
  - Tome 3 : L'Âme-Libre
  - Tome 4 : La Vengeance de Loubia
- (German) Die Geiseln des Kaisers
- (Italian) Le Perle di Lutra
- (Swedish) Lutras pärlor
- (Russian) Жемчуг Лутры (Zhemchug Lutry)

Preceded by Mattimeo	Redwall series (chronological order)	Succeeded by The Long Patrol
Preceded by Outcast of Redwall	Redwall series (publication order)	Succeeded by The Great Redwall Feast
