= Marlfox =

1998 novel by Brian Jacques

- UK first edition cover
- Author: Brian Jacques
- Cover artist: Chris Baker
- Language: English
- Series: Redwall
- Release number: 11
- Genre: Fantasy novel
- Publisher: Hutchinson (UK) & Philomel (US)
- Publication date: 1998
- Publication place: United Kingdom
- Media type: Print (hard & paperback)
- Pages: 412 (UK hardback) & 386 (US hardback)
- ISBN: 0-09-176850-0 (UK hardback) & 0-399-23307-5 (US hardback)
- OCLC: 39381004
- Preceded by: The Long Patrol
- Followed by: The Legend of Luke

Marlfox is a fantasy novel by Brian Jacques, published in 1998. It is the 11th book published and 13th chronologically in the Redwall series. Marlfoxes are an unusual breed of anthropomorphic foxes, which serve as the main antagonists in the book.

== Plot summary ==
The wandering Noonvale companions travel to Redwall, where they wish to mount a show. On the way, however, they learn that the Marlfoxes will attempt to seize Redwall, and hasten onward to warn them, while Guosim from another part of Mossflower do the same.

The Marlfoxes consist of High Queen Silth and her brood. They are different from other foxes in their fur, which gives them the ability to blend into almost any surrounding, invisible to all but the keenest eye. This ability has given rise to the false rumour that the Marlfoxes are magic, which they are not. However, Marlfoxes are highly agile and skilled with axes.

Castle Marl, home of the Marlfoxes, is situated in the middle of an enormous inland sea, on the island that was once home to Badger Lord Urthwyte the Mighty. The Marlfoxes command a vast army of water rats, and they travel around the country seeking rare and priceless artifacts.

US cover of Marlfox

The Marlfoxes, backed by an army of water rats, mount a successful invasion of Redwall and steal the tapestry of the long dead mouse hero, Martin the Warrior. The Marlfox Ziral is slain, however, and the remaining Marlfoxes swear revenge on the citizens of Redwall.

Mokkan, one of the Marlfoxes, escapes with the tapestry, leaving his siblings behind. Three young Redwallers, Songbreeze Swifteye the female Eurasian red squirrel, Dannflor Reguba the male Eurasian red squirrel, and a male Guosim common shrew named Dippler set out after Mokkan, trying to retrieve the tapestry. They meet Burble, a European water vole, and have many adventures and meet many friends who help them on their journey, such as the gigantic common hedgehog Sollertree, formerly known as Skyspike, who lost his daughter Nettlebud to the Marlfoxes and water rats, and the Mighty Megraw, a large osprey who used to live by the Marlfox island but was driven away in an ambush by magpies.

Meanwhile, the remaining Marlfoxes lay siege to Redwall. After a series of battles, Songbreeze's father Janglur Swifteye, Dannflor's father Rusvul Reguba, Cregga Rose Eyes the female Eurasian badger, and many others fight off the remaining army, killing the remaining Marlfoxes and restoring peace to Redwall. The surviving rats are divided into eight groups, with each group sent in a different direction.

Song, Dann, Dippler and Burble meet some new friends and set out into the great lake to the island. Mokkan finds that Silth has been killed by one of his sisters, Lantur. He promptly kills her by pushing her into the lake full of northern pike, proclaiming himself King. However, the companions arrive and overthrow the water rat army. Mokkan escapes in a boat, but an escaped slave, whom we find out is Nettlebud, throws a chain at him and knocks him into the lake, where he is eaten by pike.

The surviving water rats are left on the island to become peaceful creatures and farm the land, and the companions return home to Redwall, where Songbreeze Swifteye is named Abbess and Dannflor Reguba is named Abbey Champion by Cregga Rose Eyes, Redwall's blind badgermum. Dippler is named Log-a-log, and Burble is named Chief of the Watervoles.

At the end of the novel is a note, stating that the entire tale was made into a drama, edited by one Florian Dugglewoof Wilffachop the hare.

== Characters in Marlfox ==
=== Redwallers and companions ===
- Songbreeze Swifteye
- Dannflor Reguba
- Dippler
- Burble
- Janglur Swifteye
- Rusvul Reguba
- Cregga Rose Eyes
- Florian Dugglewoof Wilffachop
- Mighty Megraw
- Gawjo Swifteye
- Nutwing
- Friar Butty (the same Friar Butty from The Long Patrol)
- Gurrbowl (the same Gurrbowl from The Long Patrol)
- Brother Melilot
- Roop
- Runktipp
- Croikle, Sollertree's pet frog
- Deesum
- Dwopple, Deesum's mischievous nephew
- Ellayo Swifteye, Janglur's mother and Songbreeze's grandmother
- Sister Sloey (the same Sister Sloey from The Long Patrol)
- Sollertree
- Tragglo Spearback (the same Tragglo Spearback from The Long Patrol)
- Gubbio
- Nettlebud

=== Marlfoxes ===
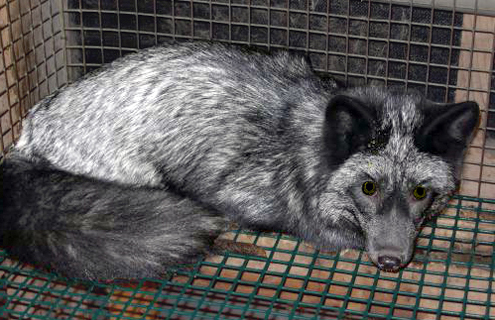
A rare silver morph of the common red fox.

The "Marl" sub-species of foxes portrayed in Marlfox actually do exist. Silver coloured foxes are a rare colour mutation of the common red fox. In the novel, the Marlfox characters are:

- Silth
- The King
- Ascrod
- Gelltor
- Lantur
- Mokkan
- Predak
- Vannan
- Ziral

=== Other villains ===
- Fenno, a rare villainess shrew
- Beelu
- Athrak, a magpie
- Raventail
- Gray One, a vole
- Durrlow, a water rat who later defected
- Ullig
- Wilce

== Book divisions (English) ==
- Act 1: Enter the Players
- Act 2: Four Chieftains Going Forth
- Act 3: The Queen's Island

(These divisions are called "acts," instead of "books," as in the other instalments of the series. This is explained by a note at the end stating that it had been edited by Florian, the hare leader of the Wandering Noonvale Companions.)

== Translations ==
- (French) Rougemuraille : Les Ombrenards
- (Italian) La Regina di Castel Vulpombra
- (Russian) Белые лисы

Preceded by The Long Patrol	Redwall series (chronological order)	Succeeded by The Taggerung
Preceded by The Long Patrol	Redwall series (publication order)	Succeeded by The Legend of Luke
