= Battle for Armageddon =

Board game

Battle for Armageddon is a strategic boardgame produced by Games Workshop. Unlike the many Games Workshop games that use miniatures, this is a more traditional counter and board game.

The game represents the Second War for Armageddon, a war in the Warhammer 40,000 universe. The conflict is between the invading Orks under the leadership of the Ork Warlord Ghazghkull Mag Uruk Thraka and the Imperial world of Armageddon's defence forces under the joint command of Herman von Strab, Overlord of Armageddon; Commander Dante of the Blood Angels; and Imperial Commissar Yarrick. Concentrating on the Armageddon Secundus region of the planet, the game is a mixture of strategy and resource management.

The game draws heavily on World War II Eastern Front sources, with the Orks taking the place of German troops and the Imperium being the Russians. It compares favourably with other Eastern Front counter wargames, emphasising the Germans (Orks) need to secure an early decisive victory otherwise they have to settle for a long drawn out defeat (or draw at the very best) and the hands of the ever increasing Russian (Imperium) forces.

The game was originally released as a boxed game, while the expansion, Chaos Attacks focused on the first war for Armageddon that takes place 300 years before Ghazghkull made his first foray into the Armageddon system.

Both games were later released for free in pdf format by Games Workshop to promote their 3rd War for Armageddon Warhammer 40,000 campaign.

The characters of Ghazghkull and Yarrick were later given rules for use in Warhammer 40,000 and Space Marine.

The game was one of 4 released using the same or similar principles - the others including Horus Heresy and Doom of the Eldar

== Reviews ==
- Challenge #74 (1994)
- Casus Belli #72 (Nov 1992)
