= The Long Patrol =

1997 novel by Brian Jacques

- UK 1st Edition Cover
- Author: Brian Jacques
- Illustrator: Allan Curless
- Cover artist: Chris "Fangorn" Baker
- Language: English
- Series: Redwall
- Release number: 10
- Genre: Fantasy novel
- Publisher: Hutchinson (UK) & Philomel (US)
- Publication date: 1997
- Publication place: United Kingdom
- Media type: Print (hardback and paperback)
- Pages: 384 (UK Hardback) & 358 (US Hardback)
- ISBN: 0-09-176546-3 (UK Hardback) & ISBN 0-399-23165-X (US Hardback)
- OCLC: 59592093
- Preceded by: The Pearls of Lutra
- Followed by: Marlfox

The Long Patrol is a fantasy novel by Brian Jacques, published in 1997. It is the tenth book published and the twelfth chronologically in the Redwall series, and it was a New York Times bestseller.

== Plot summary ==
US cover of The Long Patrol

Tamello De Fformelo Tussock (or Tammo), a young hare who lives at Camp Tussock, longs to be part of the Long Patrol at Salamandastron. However, his father, Cornspurrey De Fformelo Tussock, will not hear of it. He believes that his son is too young to join up.

Against her husband's wishes, Tammo's mother, Mem Divinia, prepares for him to leave during the night with Russa Nodrey, a wandering squirrel who is a friend of the family. The two then set off to find the Long Patrol. Along the way, they encounter the ferrets Skulka and Gromal. They do eventually meet up with the Long Patrol, but Russa is killed saving a baby badger, who is named Russano by one of the hares, Rockjaw Grang, in Russa's honour.

Meanwhile, Gormad Tunn, the rat leader of the Rapscallion army has been dying from mortal wounds. The Rapscallions are in fear of Cregga Rose Eyes, the ruler of Salamandastron. Tunn's two sons, Byral Fleetclaw and Damug Warfang, fight to the death to determine who will be the new commander of the Rapscallions. Damug kills Byral through treachery and takes over control of the army, which he commands to move inland.

At Redwall Abbey, the inhabitants discover that the south wall is mysteriously sinking into the ground. Foremole Diggum and his crew believe the best thing to do is to knock the wall down and re-build it. During the night, a storm brings a tree down on the wall, making the moles' job easier but also leaving the Abbey open to attack. The broken wall reveals a well, which turns out to be part of the ancient castle Kotir. Abbess Tansy, Friar Butty, Shad the Gatekeeper, Giygas, and Craklyn the Recorder investigate below. After a harrowing journey, they find the treasure of Verdauga Greeneyes, the long-dead lord of Kotir.

The Long Patrol goes to Redwall, hoping to inform the denizens about the threat posed by Damug. At the abbey, the spirit of Martin the Warrior appears to Tammo, instructing him to go in the company of the hare Midge Manycoats to Damug's camp. Disguised as a vermin seer, Midge advises Damug not to attack the vulnerable abbey directly, but suggests an alternate place and time instead, buying the defenders precious time to prepare themselves.

When the hare Rockjaw Grang is killed by the Rapscallions, Cregga's dreams direct her to the ridge where Midge has directed the battle to occur. Meanwhile, the Redwallers have gathered all the allies they can find, and with the Long Patrol, they battle a losing effort against the rat hordes. At a crucial point in the battle when it seems Damug has won, Lady Cregga Rose Eyes appears with the rest of the Salamandastron hares. She seizes Damug and strangles him, but he hacks at her face, blinding her in the process. The hares and Redwallers are eventually victorious, and the treasure brought back from Kotir by the Friar Butty is melted down into medals for the creatures that fought in battle. The ridge is named The Ridge of a Thousand after the vermin horde that lost all thousand of their number.

In the end, Tammo marries the beautiful Pasque Valerian, the healer of the Long Patrol, and travels to Salamandastron. Cregga remains at Redwall Abbey as the new Badger Mother, and Russano, later on, journeys to Salamandastron, with Russa's hardwood stick as his weapon. He will turn out to be one of the only Badger Lords never to be possessed by the Bloodwrath (the berserker rage Cregga and others suffered from).

== Characters in The Long Patrol ==
- Tamello De Fformelo Tussock (Tammo)
- Cornspurrey De Fformelo Tussock
- Mem Divinia
- Russa Nodrey
- Russano the Wise
- Long Patrol
  - Major Périgord Habile Sinistra
  - Captain Twayblade Sinistra
  - Pasque Valerian
  - Rockjaw Grang
  - Midge Manycoats
  - Drill Sergeant Clubrush
  - Galloper Riffle Swiftback
  - Galloper Algador Swiftback
  - Lance Corporal Ellbrig
  - Shangle Widepad
  - Sergeant Torgoch
  - Lieutenant Morio
  - Corporal Rubbadub
  - Colonel Eyebright
  - Tare and Turry
  - Trowbaggs
  - Deodar
  - Furgale
  - Reeve Starbuck
  - Cheeva
- Gormad Tunn
- Byral Fleetclaw
- Damug Warfang
- Arven
- Cregga Rose Eyes
- Foremole Diggum
- Abbess Tansy
- Friar Butty
- Shad the Gatekeeper
- Craklyn the Recorder
- Lugworm
- Brother Ginko
- Orocca, a little owl
- Skipper of otters
- Saithe De Fformelo Tussock, Tammo's mother
- Sister Sloey
- Skulka
- Lousewort & Sneezewort
- Fourdun
- Gribble
- Gromal
- Gubbio
- Gurgan Spearback
- Gurrbowl (the same Gurrbowl from Pearls of Lutra, except now female)
- Hogspit
- Log-a-Log
- Taunoc
- Tragglo Spearback
- Yellow Eel, a European eel

== Book divisions (English) ==
- Book 1: The Runaway Recruit
- Book 2: A Gathering of Warriors
- Book 3: The Ridge

== Translations ==
- (Finnish) Jänisten kaukopartio
- (French) Rougemuraille : La Patrouille
  - Tome 1 : La Fugue de Tammo
  - Tome 2 : Les Pièges de Mousseray
  - Tome 3 : Sous les remparts de Rougemuraille
  - Tome 4 : La Crête des mille
- (Italian) La Pattuglia Delle Dune
- (Swedish) Långa Patrullen
- (Russian) "Дозорный отряд"

Preceded by The Pearls of Lutra	Redwall series (chronological order)	Succeeded by Marlfox
Preceded by The Great Redwall Feast	Redwall series (publication order)	Succeeded by Marlfox
