= Mattimeo =

1989 fantasy novel by Brian Jacques

- UK first edition cover
- Author: Brian Jacques
- Illustrator: Gary Chalk
- Cover artist: Pete Lyon
- Language: English
- Series: Redwall
- Release number: 3
- Genre: Fantasy novel
- Publisher: Hutchinson (UK) & Philomel (US)
- Publication date: 1989
- Publication place: United Kingdom
- Media type: Print (hardback and paperback)
- Pages: 312 (UK Hardback) & 446 (US Hardback)
- ISBN: 0-09-173898-9 (UK Hardback) & ISBN 0-399-21741-X (US Hardback)
- OCLC: 19263369
- Preceded by: Mossflower
- Followed by: Mariel of Redwall

Mattimeo is a fantasy novel by Brian Jacques, published in 1989. It is the third book in the Redwall series. It is also one of the three Redwall novels to be made into a television series, alongside its self-titled novel (Season 1) and "Martin the Warrior" (Season 3).

== Plot summary ==
=== Slagar the Cruel ===
Mattimeo is a direct sequel to Redwall and Mossflower, taking place eight seasons (two years) after the events of the first novel. The peaceful woodland creatures of Redwall Abbey are busy preparing for a feast during the summer solstice. Matthias and Cornflower have had a son named Mattimeo, who has been generally spoiled throughout his life by the inhabitants of Redwall. Meanwhile, the masked red fox, Slagar the Cruel, and his gang of rat and weasel slavers are planning to enter Redwall Abbey during one of their feasts. Slagar, a villainous fox (the son of Sela and previously known as Chickenhound) craving revenge for a crime never committed against him, intends to capture slaves from Redwall and take them to an underground kingdom ruled by a mysterious, god-like figure named Malkariss to be sold as slaves. After drugging the Abbey residents, he kidnaps Mattimeo, Tim and Tess Churchmouse, Cynthia Bankvole and Sam Squirrel. They meet Auma (a young Eurasian badger maid) and Jube (a common hedgehog), who were also kidnapped by Slagar the Cruel. Upon discovering the children missing, Matthias, Basil Stag Hare and Jess Squirrel, with the help of a few friends, leave the Abbey to hunt down Slagar and return the children back home. They encounter Cheek, a European otter cub Matthias describes as "Cheek both by name and by nature".

US cover of Mattimeo

On their journey, they meet up with Orlando the Axe, the father of Auma, and Jabez Stump, the father of Jube. As they journey, they find the Guerrilla Union of Shrews in Mossflower (Guosim), and convince them to aid the travelers on their quest.

=== General Ironbeak ===
Meanwhile, at the Abbey, a horde of rooks, Eurasian magpies, and carrion crows led by the common raven known as General Ironbeak have come to conquer it. They instantly capture most of Redwall, starting from the top and working their way down. Then, Baby Rollo, Cornflower and Mrs. Churchmouse get kidnapped by the rooks, but the remaining Abbeydwellers manage to capture the Magpie brothers, Quickbill, Diptail and Brightback, with drugged strawberries, courtesy of Sister May. When the magpies went to forage for food for Ironbeak's crew, they ate the strawberries. The two forces then negotiate a hostage exchange. After that, the Abbey's residents take refuge in a basement called Cavern Hole, stocked with many supplies. Then Cornflower has an idea to dress up as a ghost and scare the rooks; they succeed, but General Ironbeak doesn't fall for the trick. He traps Constance in the gatehouse, then slips his army through the barricade.

=== Malkariss ===
After a long journey up cliffs, fighting a horde of archer rats, and crossing a desert and a gorge, Matthias' gang finally arrive at the underground kingdom of Malkariss, where Slagar has been trading his slaves. There, the heroes fight the massive army of rats, while Matthias frees the slaves held there and is reunited with his son. Then, while they fight, Matthias fights a large fiend called the Wearet and is thrown off a walkway into a pit, where he confronts Malkariss, who is revealed to be an ancient and somewhat repulsive European polecat. Malkariss is about to kill Matthias with his own sword when the tyrant's slaves appear and destroy their master by pelting him with the stones and rocks which they had been using to build. Matthias frees the slaves and a great battle ensues, during which Malkariss' kingdom is destroyed and his minions defeated. Later, Slagar reappears and kills Vitch, a rat slaver he worked with. Matthias and Orlando attempt to kill Slagar, who flees, only to plunge to his death down a well shaft.

The company return to Redwall after Stryk Redkite kills Ironbeak and his seer, Mangiz, and the woodlanders of Redwall send off the remaining ravens with iron collars around their necks.

The book ends with the residents of Redwall celebrating with a feast. Father Abbot declared the season Autumn of the Warriors' Return. The epilogue reveals that Tim had since become the abbey recorder (in an extract from his diary). Tess and Mattimeo had married, and Basil officially adopted Cheek (now bearing the title Cheek Stag Otter).

== Characters in Mattimeo ==
- Matthias
- Cornflower
- Mattimeo
- Slagar the Cruel
- Vitch
- Tim and Tess Churchmouse
- Cynthia Bankvole
- Rollo Bankvole
- Sam Squirrel
- Mangiz
- Auma
- Cheek
- Jubilation (Jube) Stump
- Basil Stag Hare
- Jess Squirrel
- Orlando the Axe
- Jabez Stump
- Nadaz
- Threeclaws
- General Ironbeak
- Stryk Redkite
- Constance the Badger
- Abbot Mordalfus
- Sir Harry the Muse
- John and Mrs Churchmouse
- Grubclaw
- Winifred the Otter
- Halftail
- Skinpaw
- Scringe
- Wedgeback
- Snakespur
- Fengal
- Deadnose
- Ambrose Spike
- Lettie Bankvole
- Ragwing
- Malkariss
- Ambrose Spike
- Badrag
- Bageye
- Brother Trugg
- Browntooth
- Stonefleck
- Rosyqueen Stump
- Damper
- Diptail
- Drynose
- Scurl Droptail, a con-artist Great crested newt
- Elmtail
- Sister May
- Fleaback
- Flugg, the new log-a-log after the first one dies
- Friar Hugo
- Skan, a rather selfish shrew
- Hairbelly
- Wartclaw

== Reception ==
Publishers Weekly said the book is a "truly thrilling conclusion" to the Redwall trilogy, and praised the characters as being "realistically drawn" and "full of personality". The Kirkus Reviews also offered some praise, calling it a "treat for Redwall's fans", but criticized its writing as being "wholly simplistic" and lacking depth.

== Translations ==
- (Dutch) Het Zuidland
  - Het Zuidland: Slagar de Wrede
  - Het Zuidland: De Kloof
  - Het Zuidland: Malkariss
- (French) Rougemuraille : Mattiméo
  - Tome 1 : Salik le Barbare
  - Tome 2 : Le Général Becdacier
  - Tome 3 : Le Royaume du mal
- (German) Mattimeo: Die Rache des Fuchses
  - Slagar der Grausame
  - General Eisenschnabel
  - Lord Malkariss
- (Italian)
- (Swedish)
  - Del 1: Slagar den Grymme
  - Del 2: General Järnnäbb
- (Greek) Οι Γενναιοι: Του Ρεντγоυολ
- (Latvian) Matimeo - Leģenda par Matiasa dēlu un Bendesmaisu Cietsirdi
  - Matimeo: Bendesmaiss Cietsirdis
  - Matimeo: Ģenerālis Dzelzsknābis
  - Matimeo: Malkariss

Preceded by Redwall	Redwall series (chronological order)	Succeeded by The Pearls of Lutra
Preceded by Mossflower	Redwall series (publication order)	Succeeded by Mariel of Redwall
