= Mossflower =

1988 novel by Brian Jacques

- UK first edition cover
- Author: Brian Jacques
- Illustrator: Gary Chalk
- Cover artist: Pete Lyon
- Language: English
- Series: Redwall
- Release number: 2
- Genre: Fantasy novel
- Publisher: Hutchinson (UK); Philomel Books (US)
- Publication date: 1988
- Publication place: United Kingdom
- Media type: Print (hardback and paperback)
- Pages: 420 (UK Hardback) & 431 (US Hardback)
- ISBN: 0-09-172160-1 (UK Hardback) & ISBN 0-399-21549-2 (US Hardback)
- OCLC: 17983913
- Preceded by: Redwall
- Followed by: Mattimeo

Mossflower is a fantasy novel by Brian Jacques, published in 1988. It is the second book published and third chronologically in the Redwall series.

It was intended to be adapted as the fourth season of the Redwall television series, before it was cancelled.

== Plot summary ==
US cover of Mossflower

The story begins in the Mossflower Wood, where a community of animals suffers under the tyranny of a ruling European wildcat named Verdauga Greeneyes. When a mouse from the north by the name of Martin the Warrior travels to Mossflower Woods, he is captured and brought to the castle Kotir. While there, his sword is broken by Verdauga's daughter, Tsarmina, and he is imprisoned within the Kotir dungeons. Meanwhile, Tsarmina poisons Verdauga with the help of the vixen Fortunata and blames it on her brother Gingivere. She places her brother in prison and takes the throne for herself.

While in the dungeons, Martin eventually meets Gonff the Mousethief, a fellow mouse who was imprisoned for stealing food from the Kotir storages. Meanwhile, Abbess Germaine the female mouse and the surviving members of Loamhedge, an abbey stricken with a plague, arrive and join the woodlanders. Martin and Gonff escape with help from the Corim (Council Of Resistance In Mossflower) and join with Young Dinny the European mole on a quest to find the European badger known as Boar the Fighter, Badger Lord of Salamandastron. Bella, a Corim leader and Boar's daughter, believed only her father could defeat Tsarmina and put an end to her cruel reign.

The crew sets out on the quest to find Boar. They are pursued by Splitnose the stoat, Blacktooth the ferret, and their leader, Scratch the least weasel. The trio eventually dies - Scratch by a mute swan, and Splitnose and Blacktooth in a duel. The crew eventually comes to a river with a ferry, where they meet a snake and a newt who threaten to kill the travelers. A common shrew emerges and scares away the duo into the river, and introduces himself as Log-a-log Big Club, a former village leader, escaped oar slave, and currently a ferry operator. He joins the group on its quest. They sail on his boat, Waterwing to the mountains. The ship is broken in a waterfall. When Martin comes to, he is in a huge mountain ruled by bats, called Bat Mountpit. After Martin, Dinny and Log-a-log help scare away the tawny owl that nests on the rooftop, they leave. They get ambushed by common toads, and get thrown into the "Screamhole", where they reunite with Gonff. They meet the Snakefish, the massive European eel who is trapped in the hole, and formulate a plan to escape. They eventually escape with the help of the Snakefish, who wreaks havoc among the toads. The group reaches the beach. They trek through the sand, attacked by local territorial birds. Deprived from food and freshwater, they witness gulls kill a rat. They stay at the rat's hut, and continue the next day, with Salamandastron very near. The companions reach Salamandastron with the help of a few hares, and meet with Boar the Fighter. Boar introduces them to the hares that live in the mountain, and then reforges Martin's broken sword with metal from a meteorite, but is killed while fighting the crew of his mortal enemy Ripfang the seafaring rat who had attacked Salamandastron several times before. Ripfang's former oarslaves and several members of Log-a-Log's former tribe take over the sea rat ship, Bloodwake, with help from Martin and his allies. They return to Mossflower Woods, where Martin kills Tsarmina and destroys Kotir by both flooding it and knocking over its walls with a ballista. In the final battle with Tsarmina, Martin is left near death. With the help of the woodlanders, he eventually recovers, but his memory is never the same thereafter, as evidenced in The Legend of Luke.

The book ends with Bella's son, Sunflash, finding Salamandastron and becoming its ruler.

== Characters in Mossflower ==
- Martin the Warrior
- Gonff the Mousethief
- Tsarmina Greeneyes
- Bella of Brockhall
- Gingivere
- Young Dinny
- Brogg
- Old Dinny
- Abbess Germaine
- Boar the Fighter
- Skipper Warthorn the Otter
- Lady Amber
- Captain Cludd
- Fortunata
- Verdauga Greeneyes
- Sunflash the Mace
- Splitnose
- Blacktooth
- Thicktail
- Ratflank
- Lord Cayvear
- Marshgreen
- Scratch the Weasel
- Riverwyte the Mask
- Deathcoil
- Whipscale
- Scragg
- Squint
- Snakefish
- The Gloomer, a massive, non-sentient rat
- Stormfin, a tame pike
- Argulor
- Lupin
- Bane
- Ben Stickle
- Log-a-log Big Club
- Breeze
- Root
- Chibb, a robin
- Coggs Stickle
- Columbine, Gonff's love interest and later wife
- Dampwatch
- Starbuck
- Ferdy Stickle
- Timballisto
- Urthclaw
- Ashleg, the first pine marten of the series
- Beech
- Ripfang
- Sandingomm

== Reception ==
Publishers Weekly described the book as "rousingly old-fashioned", and stated that fans of Redwall would enjoy it. Kirkus Reviews praised Jacques' ability to skillfully switch between multiple plot strands and characters without confusion, as well as his well-individualized characters. However, they also commented on the simplicity of the book's philosophy.

== Translations ==
- (Dutch) Het Moswoud
  - Het Moswoud: De Koningin van Duizend Ogen
  - Het Moswoud: De Weg Naar de Vuurberg
  - Het Moswoud: De Afrekening
- (Finnish) Sammalkukkametsän Sota
- (French) Rougemuraille : Martin le guerrier
  - La Reine aux yeux multiples
  - La Montagne de feu
  - Le Retour triomphal.
- (German)
  - In den Fängen der Wildkatze
  - Mossflower
  - Kotir: die Burg des Schreckens
- (Italian) Fiormuschiato
- (Norwegian) Moseblom
- (Swedish) Mossblomma
- (Russian) Котир: Война с Дикой Кошкой
- (Spanish) Mossflower
- (Latvian) Ķērpjziedu zeme - Leģenda par Mārtinu Karotāju
  - Ķērpjziedu zeme: Kotīra
  - Ķērpjziedu zeme: Salamandastrona
  - Ķērpjziedu zeme: Ūdenskauja

== Publication history ==
- 1988, UK, Hutchinson ISBN 0-09-172160-1, Hardback, il. by Gary Chalk
- 1988, US, Philomel ISBN 0-399-21549-2, Hardback, il. by Gary Chalk
- 2004, US, Philomel ISBN 0-399-24031-4, Hardback (green leatherette), il. by David Elliot

Preceded by Martin the Warrior	Redwall series (chronological order)	Succeeded by The Legend of Luke
Preceded by Redwall	Redwall series (publication order)	Succeeded by Mattimeo
