= Martin the Warrior =

1993 novel by Brian Jacques

- UK first edition cover
- Author: Brian Jacques
- Illustrator: Gary Chalk
- Cover artist: Chris Baker
- Language: English
- Series: Redwall
- Release number: 6
- Genre: Fantasy
- Publisher: Hutchinson (UK); Philomel (US)
- Publication date: 1993
- Publication place: United Kingdom
- Media type: Print (hardback, paperback)
- Pages: 375 (UK hardback); 376 (US hardback)
- ISBN: 0-09-176150-6 (UK hardback)
- OCLC: 29470552
- Preceded by: Salamandastron
- Followed by: The Bellmaker

Martin the Warrior is a fantasy novel by Brian Jacques, published in 1993. It is the sixth book in the Redwall series. It is also one of the three Redwall novels to be made into a television series, alongside the self-titled novel (Season 1) and "Mattimeo" (Season 2).

== Subdivisions ==
- The Prisoner and the Tyrant
- Actors and Searchers
- The Battle of Marshank

== Plot ==
US cover of Martin the Warrior

Martin the Warrior tells the story of a young mouse named Martin, a slave in Marshank under the cruel stoat Badrang the Tyrant. When Badrang leaves Martin to be tortured by the weather and seabirds, a young mousemaid, named Laterose or Rose with whom Martin falls in love, and a European mole, named Grumm hear his cry of defiance. They become instrumental in helping Martin, along with a young male Eurasian red squirrel, named Felldoh and Rose's brother, Brome, escape Marshank. When that is accomplished, they decide to travel to Noonvale to rouse an army to attack Marshank. However, in the ocean, Felldoh and Brome are separated from Rose, Martin, and Grumm. Felldoh and Brome meet up with the Rambling Rosehip Players, a travelling band of creatures, and join forces with them, eventually freeing the slaves as Brome bluffs his way into and out of Marshank, disguised as a rat from Captain Tramun Clogg the stoat's corsair crew. Meanwhile, Martin, Rose and Grumm meet a female common hedgehog named Pallum after being imprisoned by Eurasian pygmy shrews. They are eventually freed by saving the life of the Pygmy Queen's son, Dinjer, along with Pallum, who in turn joins up with them.

After a long series of adventures, the four adventurers reach Noonvale, Rose and Grumm's home. They gather an army there, but it is not large enough. But all is not lost. Boldred, a scholarly female short-eared owl whom they met on the way to Noonvale, helps gather a huge army, including the pygmy shrews and the Gawtrybe (a group of savage red squirrels). The entire army then sails to Marshank and reach it in good timing, since the Rambling Rosehip Players are in a predicament. Badrang and all of the vermin under his command, with the exception of mad Cap'n Tramun Clogg, are slain.

Rose is killed in the final battle by the very tyrant she had gone with Martin to defeat. After the battle, Martin along, with Ballaw the male hare, Rowanoak the female Eurasian badger, Brome and Keyla the male European otter all stay in Polleekin the female mole's treehouse for the short rest of the season. Martin is devastated, his one love gone and has nowhere to go. He declines going back to Noonvale with the rest, the memory of Laterose lingering too strong, not to mention that, he will have to tell Urran Voh what had happened to his daughter. He makes a vow not to tell anyone about his friends or Noonvale, in order to protect them from future enemies. He decides simply to relate a tale of living, by the sword in the caves, until the time came to move on southward.

The story of Martin and Rose is later brought to Redwall during the time of Abbot Saxtus the Eurasian harvest mouse by Aubretia the mouse, a descendant of Brome and Bultip the hedgehog, a descendant of Pallum, who brought a sprig of climbing-rose culled from that which grew on Rose of Noonvale's grave. This becomes the Laterose of Redwall. In the passing of Spring to Summer, it blooms year round a bit later than the rest and that is why it is called the Laterose.

== Characters ==
- Martin the Warrior
- Badrang the Tyrant
- Tramun Clogg
- Felldoh
- Laterose of Noonvale (Rose)
- Grumm Trencher
- Brome
- The Rambling Rosehip Players
  - Ballaw
  - Celandine
  - Buckler
  - Kastern
  - Rowanoak
  - Trefoil
- Pallum
- Barkjon
- Keyla
- Fuffle
- Hillgorse
- Druwp
- Urran Voh (Rose's father)
- Aryah (Rose's mother)
- Luke the Warrior, father of Martin
- Boldred the owl
- Hortwingle (Horty) (Boldred's husband)
- Emalet (the owl's daughter)
- Queen Amballa
- Polleekin
- Dinjer
- Wakka
- Wulpp
- Bluehide
- Aggril
- Oilback
- Gurrad
- Skalrag
- Crosstooth
- Fleabane
- Nipwort
- Rotnose
- Stumptooth
- Bluddnose
- Growch
- Gruzzle

== Translations ==
- (Dutch) De Roodburcht
- (Finnish) Urhea Martin
- (French) Rougemuraille: Le Fils de Luc
  - Tome 1 : Tarkan le tyran
  - Tome 2 : Les Baladins de l'Églantine
  - Tome 3 : La Longue route
  - Tome 4 : La Bataille de Marpoigne
- (German) Redwall: Martin der Krieger
  - Der Gefangene und der Tyrann
  - Der Ruf nach Freiheit
- (Hungarian) Martin a harcos
- (Italian) Martino il Guerriero
- (Norwegian) Helten av Redwall
- (Swedish) Martin Krigaren
- (Russian) Мартин Воитель

== Animated series adaptation ==
In February 2021, Netflix announced that an animated streaming television series based on the novel is in the works.

| Preceded by Lord Brocktree | Redwall series (chronological order) | Succeeded by Mossflower |
| Preceded by Salamandastron | Redwall series (publication order) | Succeeded by The Bellmaker |
