= Redwall =

Fantasy novel series by Brian Jacques

- Redwall (1986); Mattimeo (1989); Mossflower (1988); Mariel of Redwall (1991); Salamandastron (1992); Martin the Warrior (1993); The Bellmaker (1994); Outcast of Redwall (1995); Pearls of Lutra (1996); The Long Patrol (1997); Marlfox (1998); The Legend of Luke (1999); Lord Brocktree (2000); The Taggerung (2001); Triss (2002); Loamhedge (2003); Rakkety Tam (2004); High Rhulain (2005); Eulalia! (2007); Doomwyte (2008); The Sable Quean (2010); The Rogue Crew (2011); Orphans of Mossflower (2027)
- Author: Brian Jacques
- Illustrator: Various
- Cover artist: Various
- Country: United Kingdom
- Language: English
- Genre: Children's, Fantasy novel
- Published: 23 October 1986 – September 2027
- Media type: Print (hardback & paperback)

Redwall is a children's fantasy novel series by British writer Brian Jacques, published from 1986 to 2011. It is also the title of the first book of the series, published in 1986, as well as the name of the abbey featured in the book. There is an animated television series based on three of the novels (Redwall, Mattimeo, and Martin the Warrior), which first aired in 1999. The books are primarily aimed at pre- to early adolescents. Twenty-two novels and two picture books have been published, ending with The Rogue Crew, which was posthumously released on 3 May 2011, almost three months after Jacques' death on 5 February. A new novel, Orphans of Mossflower, is scheduled to be published on 7 September 2027, 16 years after Jacques' death.

== Series overview ==
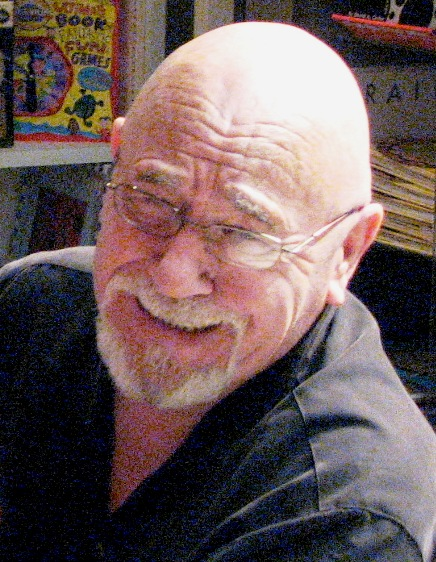
The Redwall series was written by Brian Jacques.

The series follows anthropomorphic forest animals living in Redwall Abbey and the surrounding area of Mossflower Wood. In multiple installments of the series, the peaceful forest animals are called upon to defend their home from enemies such as vermin; for example, the first installment of the series features a band of antagonistic rats.

The novels in the series are set in various time periods in the fictional history of Redwall and Mossflower; the chronological order of the stories is not the same as the order in which they were written, some taking place before the construction of Redwall Abbey itself or in far-flung locations beyond Mossflower. Some of the books focus on characters who, in other volumes, are legendary historical figures, such as The Legend of Luke. Because of the widely spaced storylines, very few characters are mentioned in more than one or two novels. One notable exception is Martin the Warrior, one of the founders of Redwall Abbey, whose adventures are chronicled in several of the novels and who is frequently mentioned as an icon of heroism who inspires later Redwall denizens, occasionally appearing to them as a spiritual vision.

Despite the changing historical setting and absence of recurring characters, familiar character archetypes recur throughout the books, often characters in tribe-specific leadership roles, such as the Badger Lords, the Skipper of Otters, or the shrew tribe leader "Log-a-Log". Other recurring elements include "Dibbuns" (the Redwall name for infant woodlanders) and detailed descriptions of food.

Although the main setting is an abbey, and several characters are referred to as monks, friars, or other such titles, the series makes little mention of religious beliefs or practices. Early novels establish a St. Ninian's church near Redwall Abbey, but a later novel retcons St. Ninian's as a misnomer for a building that was never a church.

The Redwall novels are characterized as fantasy, but contain little in the way of magic or the supernatural, apart from visions, prophetic dreams, and the anthropomorphism of the animal characters. The sword of Martin the Warrior is believed by many characters to be magical, and vermin occasionally try to steal it for this reason; Mossflower reveals that it was forged from a fragment of a meteorite at the volcanic fortress Salamandastron by the Badger Lord known as Boar the Fighter. The novels' "monsters" are not mythical creatures, but real-world predators such as adders, sharks, and wolverines.

At the time of Jacques' death, twenty-one novels had been released, the final one being The Sable Quean in February 2010. The twenty-second book, The Rogue Crew, was released posthumously on 3 May 2011.

The prequels to Redwall were not released in any chronological order. The sequels, including Mattimeo, were released in the order in which they occur. The books are listed below in their chronological order within the fictional world of Redwall, with publication dates noted.

The first three chronologically ordered books (Lord Brocktree, Martin the Warrior, and Mossflower) take place before the construction of Redwall Abbey, while the fourth, The Legend of Luke, takes place during its construction. Many of the books that take place before Redwall was constructed are told via a framing device. Most books adjacent to each other in chronological order take place within a generation or so of each other, as evidenced by mentions of past characters in the later books. Redwall and Mattimeo feature the same cast, as do Mariel of Redwall and The Bellmaker, with a short span of time between them. From Triss onward, however, they take place so far apart in time that none share any characters with other books anymore.

=== Characters ===
In Redwall, there are a variety of recurring animal species; species commonly portrayed in protagonistic roles include hedgehogs, mice, shrews, and badgers.

Species often determines a creature's nature, whether good or evil. For example, a band of rats, led by Cluny the Scourge, threatens the abbey in Redwall; in Mattimeo, a different group of rats captures woodland characters.

Birds are present in the series, playing both good and evil roles including an attempted siege of Redwall in Mattimeo of the abbey by antagonistic crows. An example of birds serving a positive role, however, is in Redwall. The colony of sparrows living the roof of the abbey, while initially hostile to the woodland creatures, grow friendly after Matthias nurses the injured sparrow Warbeak, who would later become queen, back to health and befriends her.

=== Locations ===
The books are centered around Redwall Abbey, a red sandstone abbey built after the events of Mossflower. It is home to many of the good animals of Mossflower Woods. Also important is the mountain fortress called Salamandastron, home to the Badger Lords and the famed hares of the Long Patrol, the mountain's army. Other notable places include the fortress Riftgard, Loamhedge, and Green Isle. A main recurring waterway is the River Moss. In other stories, like The Bellmaker and The Legend of Luke, most of the story takes place aboard sailing ships.

There are also the far northern lands; much of the wildlife in the books from those lands are those native to Scotland specifically, such as pine martens and golden eagles. There are also islands featured in the series; usually, each island is featured in one book only.

== Reception ==
The Redwall series has been widely praised. The books of the Redwall series have drawn comparisons to J. R. R. Tolkien’s The Lord of the Rings, to Kenneth Grahame's The Wind in the Willows, and Richard Adams's Watership Down. Jacques combines "action, poetry, songs, courage, and vivid descriptions" to create a unique style that spans the series.

The Redwall series has received praise for its "equal-opportunity adventuring, in which female creatures can be just as courageous (or as diabolical) as their male counterparts". Novels such as Mariel of Redwall, Pearls of Lutra, High Rhulain and Triss all feature strong female leading characters. Jacques has also received acclaim for his development of unique language intrinsic to certain species, giving the novels an "endearing dialectal dialogue".

Some reviews have been critical of the Redwall novels for providing too simplistic a view of good and evil. The characteristics of the animals in the novels are fixed by their species, making them quite "predictable", though there have been a few books, such as in Outcast of Redwall and Pearls of Lutra, in which vermin have acted selflessly, in one taking a spear through the chest and back meant for his former nursemaid (though she disregards his actions as impulse and comes to consider him born to be evil), and in the other saving the Abbot of Redwall from lizards. Another exception is in The Bellmaker, where a searat strives to start being good instead of evil, abandoning his life of pirating to live by himself. In some cases, different members of the same species possess different moral compasses. For example, the wildcats in the book Mossflower each exhibit different characteristics: although Lady Tsarmina is cruel and vicious, her father Lord Verdauga is seen as hard but fair, and her brother Gingivere is kind and eventually joins the side of the woodlanders. As a general rule, though, characters tend to "epitomize their class origins", rarely rising above them.

Many reviewers have also criticized the Redwall series for repetition and predictability, citing "recycled" plot lines and Jacques' tendency to follow a "pattern to the dot". Other reviewers note that such predictable "ingredients" may be what "makes the Redwall recipe so consistently popular". Although the series does not break new ground in terms of plot formula, it does provide satisfying adventures with "comforting, predictable conclusions for its fans".

== Illustrators ==
The last interior artist was Sean Rubin. Prior to Rubin taking over in 2009, David Elliot illustrated six books in the Redwall series, including Eulalia!, published in 2007. Elliot also illustrated the anniversary edition of Mossflower, with full page illustrations. Other previous interior illustrators include Gary Chalk (Redwall, Mariel of Redwall, and Martin the Warrior), Allan Curless (The Bellmaker, The Long Patrol), Chris Baker (Marlfox to Lord Brocktree) and Peter Standley (The Taggerung). The cover artist of the US editions of the novels is Troy Howell. Pete Lyon and Douglas Hall provided cover art for different UK editions of the first four books. Later, Chris Baker became the UK cover artist up until the release of Triss, when David Wyatt took over.

== Adaptations ==
=== International editions ===
Books in the Redwall series have been translated into more than 20 languages, including Italian, German, Norwegian, Danish, Swedish, Polish, Dutch, Russian, and Japanese.

=== Television series and cancelled films ===
The first season of the Redwall television series, released in 1999, was based upon the novel Redwall. It was later followed by two more seasons, based on the books Mattimeo and Martin the Warrior. Each season contained 13 episodes. Each episode was opened with Brian Jacques himself giving a synopsis of the story so far. These scenes were later cut from subsequent re-airings and DVD releases.

In February 2021, Netflix acquired full adaptation rights to the novel series. A feature film based on the novel Redwall and an animated "event series" based on the character Martin the Warrior are in the works for the streaming platform. Patrick McHale, creator of Over the Garden Wall, was attached to the project and writing the film's script. Due to changes at Netflix in December 2022, however, McHale was no longer working on the feature film. In April 2026, it was reported that all the animated adaptations from Netflix were cancelled.

=== Audiobooks ===
There have been full-length audiobooks published of most of the Redwall books, the exceptions being The Pearls of Lutra, Marlfox, Lord Brocktree (on cassette), The Legend of Luke, and The Rogue Crew. Instead of being read by a single actor, the novels are narrated by a large cast. Brian Jacques served as the narrator for almost all of the audiobooks (with Salamandastron being the sole exception), sometimes reading select parts, and his son Marc Jacques appeared as the characters Matthias, Martin and others. The audiobooks also feature fully-realized musical performances of the songs that each book contains, composed and performed by Billy Maher.

Some abridged audiobooks have also been released. They include Redwall, Mossflower, Pearls of Lutra, The Long Patrol, Marlfox, The Legend of Luke and Lord Brocktree. Each is three hours in length and read solely by Brian Jacques or another narrator.

=== Opera ===
In 1996, Evelyn Swenson composed an opera based on the first book in the Redwall series. It was produced by OperaDelaware in Wilmington, Delaware and later toured Europe.

=== Games ===
There are multiple officially-licensed video games based on the Redwall series. All of these games were created by Soma Games under the banner of The Lost Legends of Redwall. These games include "Redwall AbbeyCraft - The Corsair's Last Treasure," a Minecraft adventure map; "The Scout Anthology," a video game narrative with three acts; "The Lost Legends of Redwall," an app with three different choose-your-own-adventure narratives; and "Feasts & Friends," a cooking simulation.

== Other books ==
- The Great Redwall Feast (1996) (picture book)
- Redwall Map & Riddler (1998)
- Redwall Friend & Foe (2000)
- A Redwall Winter's Tale (2001) (picture book)
- Tribes of Redwall Badgers (2001)
- Tribes of Redwall Otters (2002)
- Tribes of Redwall Mice (2003)
- The Redwall Cookbook (2005)
- The Redwall Graphic Novel (2007)
