= List of Redwall episodes =

Redwall is a television series made by Canada-based Nelvana and France-based Alphanim and is based on the Redwall novels by Brian Jacques. The series spans three seasons, the first based on the first book Redwall, the second on Mattimeo and the third on Martin the Warrior. There are 39 episodes in total.

== Series overview ==
Season	Book	Episodes	Originally released	
Season	Book	Episodes	First released	Last released
1	Redwall	13	September 8, 1999	October 8, 1999
2	Mattimeo	13	November 4, 2000	January 21, 2001
3	Martin the Warrior	13	December 3, 2001	February 25, 2002

== Episodes ==
=== Season 1: Redwall (1999) ===
No. overall	No. in season	Title	Directed by	Original release date
1	1	"Cluny the Scourge: Part 1"	Raymond Jafelice and Pascal Pinon	September 8, 1999
The searat Cluny the Scourge comes to Mossflower woods with his fellow rats, and young Matthias remembers him from his childhood days, the rat who murdered his family.
2	2	"Cluny the Scourge: Part 2"	Raymond Jafelice and Pascal Pinon	September 11, 1999
Cluny sends Shadow over the wall to get the tapestry of Martin the Warrior, the rats plan to attack and uses their forces as decoys so they can climb across from a tree into Redwall. Meanwhile, Matthias and Basil Stag Hare go to set the voles free. Asmodeus the snake is introduced, so is Basil. Cheesethief makes his debut appearance as well.
3	3	"Treachery"	Raymond Jafelice and Pascal Pinon	September 12, 1999
Cluny gets the vixen Sela and her son, Chickenhound, to heal his leg. And uses her as a way to make the Redwallers think an attack is coming from straight on, when really it is coming from the ground. Killconey is introduced.
4	4	"Sparra's Kingdom"	Raymond Jafelice and Pascal Pinon	September 17, 1999
Matthias goes up onto the roof with the sparrow Warbeak to see if Martin's sword is up in the sparrows' domain. Matthias learns that the snake Asmodeus has Martin's sword.
5	5	"Cluny's Clowns"	Raymond Jafelice and Pascal Pinon	September 18, 1999
A circus comes to Mossflower and Cluny sneaks two of his rats, Redtooth and Fangburn, into it so they can take over Redwall from the inside. Methuselah dies.
6	6	"High Standards"	Raymond Jafelice and Pascal Pinon	September 19, 1999
Basil, Jess, and Matthias go to get the tapestry of Martin the Warrior from Cluny. No food can get into the Abbey because of Cluny's blockade.
7	7	"Captain Snow"	Raymond Jafelice and Pascal Pinon	September 24, 1999
Not knowing where Asmodeus's home is, Matthias goes to ask the white owl Captain Snow if he knows where Asmodeus lives. Squire Julian the cat and the shrews are introduced.
8	8	"Battle Plans"	Raymond Jafelice and Pascal Pinon	September 25, 1999
Cluny moves his camp right outside Redwall, and Basil and Constance the badger build a giant crossbow to kill Cluny. Killconey the ferret, however, hears about it, and Cheesethief is used as a decoy.
9	9	"The Visitor"	Raymond Jafelice and Pascal Pinon	September 26, 1999
The dormouse Furlo the Spicer comes to Redwall and kidnaps Cornflower because Cluny has captured Furlo's wife and will release her if Furlo kidnaps Cornflower. Matthias, being Redwall's defender, goes with Foremole to save Cornflower.
10	10	"A Favour Returned"	Raymond Jafelice and Pascal Pinon	October 1, 1999
The tribing dormice are killed and eaten off by Asmodeus. Cluny starts to 'go off his rocker', as Fangburn says. Matthias goes to get the sword but turns around because Warbeak tells him the rats are making plans. Warbeak and another sparrow go to count the number of rats, but Warbeak is captured and put on Asmodeus's trail. Darkclaw, Killconey, and Fangburn think about taking over with Cluny 'out of service'.
11	11	"Asmodeus"	Raymond Jafelice and Pascal Pinon	October 2, 1999
Matthias finally is able to go get the sword from the adder Asmodeus Poisonteeth. With the help of the Guosim shrews, he finds Asmodeus's lair. Cluny makes 'any creature big enough to lift sword' join him. Asmodeus is killed by Matthias in the end, but he and the shrews are stuck underground. Log-a-Log is introduced.
12	12	"Underground"	Raymond Jafelice and Pascal Pinon	October 3, 1999
Matthias and the shrew try to get out from underground. Meanwhile, Cluny prepares an attack. Killconey tells Cluny and Fangburn about what Matthias is doing. Cornflower and silent Sam the squirrel find the armor of Martin the Warrior.
13	13	"The Final Conflict"	Raymond Jafelice and Pascal Pinon	October 8, 1999
Cluny uses the dormouse, Plumpen, to let him into the Abbey. Matthias and the shrews get back from Mossflower woods. Matthias is away at the time to get the 'Shrewvian Reinforcements' as Log-a-Log says. Once Matthias is back the final battle begins. Cluny is killed in the end, so is the rest of Cluny's rat, stoat (weasels are mentioned but are never seen), and ferret horde.

=== Season 2: Mattimeo (2000–2001) ===
No. overall	No. in season	Title	Directed by	Original release date
14	1	"Slagar the Slaver"	Raymond Jafelice and Luc Bihan	November 4, 2000
A mysterious hooded fox named Slagar the Cruel abducts a young badgermaid named Auma and her father Orlando sets out to find her. Eight seasons after the defeat of Cluny, Matthias is married to Cornflower and they have a son called Mattimeo. Slagar, out for revenge against Matthias, sneaks into Redwall with his horde disguised as a group of traveling entertainers. They drug everyone's drinks and while the Abbey dwellers are asleep, kidnap Mattimeo and the other children as Slagar curses Matthias' name.
15	2	"The Magician Revealed"	Raymond Jafelice and Luc Bihan	November 5, 2000
The adult residents of Redwall awaken to discover their children are gone. Matthias, Basil Stag Hare and Jess Squirrel leave on a mission to find them. Meanwhile, Mattimeo, Sam, Cynthia, Auma, and others from Redwall find out that Slagar is Chickenhound, the fox who was believed to be dead.
16	3	"Where the Little Folk Go"	Raymond Jafelice and Luc Bihan	November 12, 2000
Matthias, Jess, and Basil find the young otter Cheek. Jube the hedgehog is taken captive by Slagar. A newt cheats Mattimeo and friends out of everything they have. Matthias, Jess, Basil, and Cheek meet Jabez Stump and Orlando the Axe. The inhabitants of Redwall begin to figure out clues from the spirit of Martin the Warrior.
17	4	"Found... And Lost"	Raymond Jafelice and Luc Bihan	November 19, 2000
Matthias and his partners are close to finding the kidnapped children, but Slagar lures him and the others into a cave and blocks the entrance under a pile of rocks. The Guosim shrews know that something is going on. The Redwallers find more clues to where Slagar is headed.
18	5	"To Be a Warrior"	Raymond Jafelice and Luc Bihan	November 26, 2000
The Guosim shrews have freed Matthias and the others. Slagar and the slaves keep on moving. More clues are found by the Redwallers.
19	6	"Ironbeak"	Raymond Jafelice and Luc Bihan	December 3, 2000
The raven Ironbeak with his army of rooks, crows, and magpies comes to Mossflower and they begin to attack Redwall.
20	7	"Peril in the Toplands"	Raymond Jafelice and Luc Bihan	December 10, 2000
Slagar moves the slaves up to the top of a plateau, where the rat Stonefleck is waiting for them. They then have to travel through the forest of the 'Painted Ones', which resemble lemurs. They then have to cross a river where a giant horde of rats is waiting. With the help of an owl, Sir Harry the Muse, Matthias and the others get onto the plateau, face the 'Painted Ones' and begin to cross the river. The rats, however, try to stop them, and send a lot of them into the water, full of carnivorous fish.
21	8	"Feathered Friends & Foes"	Raymond Jafelice and Luc Bihan	December 17, 2000
Ironbeak and his armies take over parts of Redwall, the sparrows who have been told where Slagar is heading find Matthias fighting the rats on the plateau. Matthias wins with the help of the sparrows, but the sparrow queen Warbeak is killed.
22	9	"The Abyss"	Raymond Jafelice and Luc Bihan	December 24, 2000
Mattimeo and the other slaves are forced to walk across a desert. Then they must cross a rickety bridge across a giant abyss. Matthias and the others begin to cross the desert but Slagar has burned the bridge. The owl, Sir Harry, comes to their rescue when vultures attack them. He also helps them cross the abyss.
23	10	"Malkariss"	Raymond Jafelice and Luc Bihan	December 31, 2000
The battle against Ironbeak gets even fiercer. The slaves are taken by black-robed rats from Malkariss. Matthias and the others are warned by a crazy old rabbit that danger lies ahead. They also run into Slagar's stranded weasel, stoat, and ferret henchmen.
24	11	"Battle"	Raymond Jafelice and Luc Bihan	January 7, 2001
Mattimeo and the others are introduced to the underground empire of Malkariss by the rat Nadaz. Matthias and the others figure out that Malkariss is what once was Loamhedge Abbey. A battle against the black-robed rats begins. A red kite named Stryk crashes at Redwall and Constance and Cornflower begin to take care of her. Ironbeak has control of almost the entire Abbey.
25	12	"Reunited"	Raymond Jafelice and Luc Bihan	January 14, 2001
Matthias faces the monster, the Wearet, and the battle underground gets worse. Log-a-log is killed. The slaves are freed. Matthias is presumed dead when he falls off of a cliff and learns that Malkariss is an old, pathetic ferret.
26	13	"Return to Redwall"	Raymond Jafelice and Luc Bihan	January 21, 2001
The kingdom of Malkariss is destroyed. Back at Redwall the red kite, Stryk, kills Ironbeak. Orlando and Matthias chase Slagar down after he kills a fleeing Vitch, but he falls down a well to his death. They then all return safely home to Redwall Abbey.

=== Season 3: Martin the Warrior (2001–2002) ===
No. overall	No. in season	Title	Directed by	Original release date
27	1	"Captured!"	Luc Bihan	December 3, 2001
Young Martin, a slave to the stoat Badrang, fights off the weasel Hisk and remembers how he was captured and how much he hates Lord Badrang. Meanwhile, a mousemaid named Rose and her mole friend Grumm come upon Badrang's fortress, Marshank. They are looking for Rose's brother Brome who has been caught and imprisoned by Badrang. Clogg, a pirate stoat, also sees Marshank in the distance.
28	2	"The Return of Clogg"	Luc Bihan	December 10, 2001
The stoat pirate, Tramun Josiah Cuttlefish Clogg, comes ashore and meets up with his old pal, Lord Badrang.
29	3	"Escape from Marshank"	Luc Bihan	December 17, 2001
Martin, Brome, and the squirrel Felldoh escape from Marshank with the help of Rose and Grumm.
30	4	"New Friends and Old Enemies"	Luc Bihan	December 24, 2001
Brome, Felldoh, Martin, Rose, and Grumm are all split up at sea. Brome and Felldoh wind up not far away and are taken in by the Rambling Rosehip Players, led by the hare Ballaw de Quincewold and the badger Rowanoak. Martin, Rose, and Grumm are forced to be slaves of a pygmy shrew colony where they meet the hedgehog, Pallum.
31	5	"The Play's the Thing"	Luc Bihan	December 31, 2001
To help the other slaves who are in Marshank, Felldoh, Brome and Ballaw along with the other Rambling Rosehip Players plan to put on a performance at Marshank and help the slaves escape during it all.
32	6	"Freedom and Monsters"	Luc Bihan	January 7, 2002
Rose, Grumm, Martin, and Pallum head toward Rose's home of Noonvale, while Felldoh and Brome try to free the slaves.
33	7	"The Great Escapes"	Luc Bihan	January 14, 2002
Rose, Grumm, Martin, and Pallum are captured by cannibal lizards, but, luckily, are saved by the heron called the Warden. Felldoh, Brome and the escaped slaves fight against Clogg and his pirates.
34	8	"From Marshes to Mountain Heights"	Luc Bihan	January 21, 2002
Martin and his friends leave the marshes and go into the mountain land where they run into the savage squirrels, the Gawtrybe.
35	9	"Heroes and Fools"	Luc Bihan	January 28, 2002
Martin fights Wakk, leader of the Gawtrybe. Then he and his companions must climb a mountain with the Gawtrybe following them.
36	10	"Tunnel Vision"	Luc Bihan	February 4, 2002
Martin and his friends are saved from the Gawtrybe by the owl, Boldred. Felldoh begins attacking Marshank every night.
37	11	"Felldoh's Revenge"	Luc Bihan	February 11, 2002
Mad with hatred towards Badrang, Felldoh sneaks off to confront the evil stoat in a one-on-one duel. Badrang doesn't play fair, however, and sends for his troops who surround Felldoh and kill him outside Marshank's gate. Martin and the others reach Noonvale.
38	12	"Battlefield Marshank"	Luc Bihan	February 18, 2002
Martin leaves Noonvale with an army to attack Marshank, the Rambling Rosehip Players and escaped slaves do as well. Boldred the owl has gathered an army of the pygmy shrews, the Gawtrybe, the water shrews, the Warden, and other creatures to join Martin's army.
39	13	"Rose of Noonvale"	Luc Bihan	February 25, 2002
The final battle takes place inside Marshank. In the end, Badrang is killed but so is Martin's love, Rose. Heartbroken, Martin says goodbye to his friends and travels south alone. It is explained that eventually he found peace when he helped build Redwall Abbey.
