= The Ribbajack =

2004 fantasy book by Brian Jacques

The Ribbajack & Other Curious Yarns
- Author: Brian Jacques
- Language: English
- Genre: Young adult fantasy
- Publisher: Philomel
- Publication date: 2004
- Media type: Print (hardcover)
- Pages: 168 pp (hardcover edition)
- ISBN: 0-399-24220-1
- OCLC: 54046189

The Ribbajack & Other Curious Yarns is a fantasy book by Brian Jacques, published in 2004. It was published the same year as Jacques' Rakkety Tam (the 17th book in his better known Redwall fantasy series). There are six tales in this book, all of them like the tales in Seven Strange and Ghostly Tales, by the same author. The titles are: "The Ribbajack", "A Smile and a Wave", "The All Ireland Champion Versus the Nye Add", "The Mystery of Huma D'Este", "Miggy Mags and the Malabar Sailor", and "Rosie's Pet."

The "Ribba Jack" is also an ancient term for a physical appearance of ones worst fear. The Ribbajack (in the story) is a grotesque animal that is summoned by a person's anger to kill another.

== Individual story plotlines ==
=== The Ribbajack ===
Archibald Smifft, who lives at a boarding school, torments anyone he can find with insults and the like. The matron and headmaster discover his practices of dark magic, and decide that something must be done. One day, when an old army veteran comes to lecture him about his horrible behavior, he is extremely displeased and searches for something to take revenge. Just then, the two boys that share his dormitory come in and one accidentally lets slip that he possesses a letter containing information on the Ribbajack. Archibald snatches the letter at once and attempts to conjure his own Ribbajack to destroy the man who lectured him - and succeeds. Fortunately for the monster's intended victim, the medal that he is wearing at the time, gifted to him by an Indian fakir, is enchanted to drive away Ribbajacks and turn them on their creators - thus, Archibald Smifft is gone from the boarding school forever.

=== A Smile and a Wave ===
Maggie would like to go to the ice-skating rink, but she must bring her coat with her if she is to go. The only problem is that she deliberately left the coat at school because of her dislike of it. Her mother orders her to go back to the school to retrieve the coat, despite Maggie's protests that the school is locked at night. Reluctantly, Maggie revisits the school and finds her coat but comes upon a ghost of a girl holding a rose. The girl's face frightens Maggie enough to put on her coat and flee the school. Later, a school official finds some information in a book concerning the name of the school, the Leah Edwina Tranter School. Leah was a lonely girl with wealthy parents who did not spend much time with her. When she was fourteen years old, she disappeared and later turned up dead concealed behind a bookcase and holding a rose in one hand. Her father was devastated and sank into depression. His wife left him. Much later, he wrote in his will that a school was to be built on the site of his home, and that it was to be named the Leah Edwina Tranter School.

=== The All Ireland Champion Versus the Nye Add ===
Roddy Mooney is extremely good at fishing; thus, he is the All Ireland Champion Fisherman, but he is lazy and does not help his mother to take care of the house and themselves (he lives with his mother). One day, he crosses paths with young Mickey Hennessy, who declares that he intends to catch a Nye Add. Roddy finds out about Nye Adds from Mickey; they are mermaids. Roddy pretends that he does not believe Mickey, but goes home to get his fishing supplies and catch the Nye Add that Mickey claims he saw earlier (although Roddy believes it is a huge fish because he and Mickey saw the Nye Add's tail). Roddy hooks something large and attempts to reel it in, but the thing on the other end of the line pulls back and Roddy falls into the water - it's a Nye Add! Soon after, the Nye Add's mother shoves Roddy back up to the surface and scolds her daughter severely. Roddy is never the same again after his encounter with the Nye Add. The narrator reveals that Mickey goes down to the riverbank every midsummer night and that the Nye Add returns to the surface at the same time to look for Roddy. Mickey has learned her language and that she is a Kelpie, not a Nye Add. Finally, it's revealed that the story is being narrated by Mickey himself.

=== The Mystery of Huma D'Este ===
Jason Hunter is an extremely handsome boy, a great sprinter...and a bully. When he finds out about a new student coming to the school, he attempts to make her his next target but he cannot do it, for some reason. Later, he finds out her name is Huma D'Este and attempts to use it to make fun of her, but she retaliates by making fun of his name and drawing a rude picture on the blackboard. Much later, one morning Jason is drawn by a mysterious voice to a Greek temple where Huma D'Este is waiting for him. She shows him eleven marble statues and he deduces that one is missing. After trying to get him to tell her who was the captain of the Argo in Greek mythology, she tells him that he was called Jason and that he was the final piece of her collection. Jason finds out that "Huma D'Este" is an anagram of "The Medusa"! She turns him to marble. Myriad years later, two of Jason's classmates, Carlene and Mal Blake, have married and have children and grandchildren. The two go on a cruise and Carlene tours an exhibit of marble statues. She notices that one of the statues looks suspiciously like her classmate Jason Hunter.

== Reception ==
Kirkus Reviews praised the book for its "sly humor and suspenseful plotting".
