= The Rogue Crew =

2011 novel by Brian Jacques

- Author: Brian Jacques
- Illustrator: Sean Rubin
- Language: English
- Series: Redwall
- Release number: 22
- Genre: Fantasy novel
- Publication date: May 3, 2011
- Publication place: United Kingdom
- Media type: Print (Hardback)
- ISBN: 978-0-399-25416-1
- Preceded by: The Sable Quean

The Rogue Crew is the 22nd book of the Redwall series by Brian Jacques, released on May 3, 2011. It is the final novel of the Redwall series, due to Jacques' death on February 5, 2011.

== Plot ==
After a defeat at the hands of the Rogue Crew, Razzid Wearat's seer, Shekra the red fox, tells him of Redwall Abbey, a place that he can plunder easily. He sets the course for it, killing all who stand in his way.

Skor Axehound the European otter and Rake Nightfur the European brown hare hear about this and they team up to kill off the Wearat and his horde once and for all. Meanwhile, the Wearat wreaks havoc on land, killing otters and Guosim common shrews, all the time making his way to Redwall.

Skor Axehound has a young son Swiffo, who doesn't care for weapons and, against his father's will, joins the fortunate Freepaws. The hares that are in the Long Patrol, as well as the otters of the Rogue Crew, try to outdo one another, until Kite the Slayer finds that there are differences between them, but in order to overcome this together, they all need to look past them.

Shekra stumbles across Drogbuk Wiltud the common hedgehog. They take him aboard the Greenshroud hoping to get directions to Redwall, until finally, Skor meets up with the Wearat's crew and Drogbuk leaps overboard. Swiffo finds the hedgehog and gives him a good bath, making him lose all of his spikes. Swiffo later gets killed by a vermin fox who has poison darts when they are closer to the Abbey.

When the Greenshroud is within sight of Redwall, Dibbun babies spot it from the top of a tower, and when their caretaker comes to get them she notices the green-sailed ship on its way. She warns the Abbot, while Skor and Rake find their way there. When they arrive, the Wearat is defeated by Jum Gurdy, the otter cellardog, and Posybud, a young hedgehog. The vermin crew is slain.

Preceded by The Sable Quean	Redwall series (publication order)	Succeeded by –
