= Redwall (TV series) =

Animated series

- Title card for Season 1
- Genre: Action; Drama; Supernatural
- Based on: Redwall by Brian Jacques
- Developed by: Steve Roberts
- Directed by: Raymond Jafelice (seasons 1–2); Pascal Pinon (season 1); Luc Bihan (seasons 2–3)
- Voices of: see Voice Cast
- Composers: Daniel Fernandez; Jack Procher
- Countries of origin: Canada; France (season 1); Germany (seasons 2–3)
- Original language: English
- No. of seasons: 3
- No. of episodes: 39 (list of episodes)

Production
- Executive producers: Michael Hirsh; Patrick Loubert; Clive A. Smith; Ramsay Cameron; Christian Davin (season 1); Dan Maddicott (season 1); Peter Volkle (seasons 2–3)
- Running time: 22 minutes
- Production companies: Nelvana Limited; Molitor Productions Ltd.; United Productions (season 1); Alphanim (season 1); TV-Loonland AG (seasons 2–3)

Original release
- Network: Teletoon (Canada); France 2 (France); France 3 (France); KI.KA (Germany)
- Release: September 8, 1999 – February 25, 2002

Redwall is an animated television series co-produced by the Canada-based Nelvana, along with the France-based Alphanim (season 1) and Germany-based TV-Loonland AG (seasons 2–3) that ran from 1999 until 2002. The series is based on the Redwall novels by Brian Jacques. The series spans three seasons, the first based on the first book Redwall, the second on Mattimeo and the third on Martin the Warrior.

The series originally aired on Teletoon (now as Cartoon Network) in Canada, along with being independently distributed in the U.S. by American Public Television through public television stations.

== Plot ==
=== Redwall ===
Cornflower and Matthias.

A young mouse named Matthias lives at Redwall Abbey. Reminiscing on his past life, he remembers how his family was very poor. During a particularly harsh winter, an army of Rats, led by Cluny the Scourge, attacked his village. Separated from his family, Matthias saw Cluny just before he was rescued by his sister and, with advice from voles, travelled to Redwall Abbey, with the memory of Cluny still fresh in their minds. After difficult travels, Matthias' sister collapsed, and Matthias followed soon after. When he came to, he found that he had been brought to Redwall Abbey, where the fathers of the abbey later informed him that his sister had died of exhaustion from the journey. Matthias was then raised in the abbey as a novice, yet dreamed of becoming a great warrior like Martin, the warrior-mouse that helped found Redwall. When he joined Constance the Badger in escorting some woodlanders from a feast at the Abbey, he was shocked when he spotted Cluny and his rats marching onto Redwall, taking a nearby church as their main base. Cluny and his captains went to Redwall, claiming to be travelers until they were inside, when Cluny makes his demands clear. In a fit of rage, Matthias attacked them, telling them exactly what he thought of them. Cluny and his captains were forced to leave when Constance threatened to kill them if they did not leave. When he was forced outside, Cluny instructed his only climber, the ninja-esque Shadow, to steal the image of Martin from the tapestry to reduce Redwall's morale. Shadow was successful, but was intercepted by Matthias, and fell to his death from the walls. Cluny then took the image of Martin as his war standard. However, Cluny had nightmares about Martin and Matthias for as long as the tapestry was in his possession. This was soon remedied when Matthias's friends, Jess Squirrel and Basil Stag Hare, stole the tapestry back.

After a number of battles, Matthias was busily looking for Martin's sword, theorizing that they could drive Cluny away if they found it. With old Methuselah the abbey recorder and Cornflower (a young mouse who Matthias was close friends with), they discover that Matthias was to be the next Abbey warrior, like Martin before him. Through a riddle they found under the tapestry, they discovered Martin's tomb underneath a set of stone stairs, and there they found Martin's shield and sword-belt. Next, Matthias found Martin's sheath in the roost of the Sparra, a tribe of savage sparrows living in the roof spaces, ruled by the insane King Bull Sparra. Matthias stole the sheath from the Sparra, killing Bull Sparra in the process, and befriended a young Sparrow named Warbeak. However, he learned that the sword was taken from the Sparra by Asmodeus Poisonteeth, a huge snake. On a journey to find information, Matthias met the Guosim Shrews, a tribe of argumentative shrews who told him to speak to a large snowy owl named Captain Snow for information. Snow told him that Asmodeus lives in a nearby quarry, but mocked Matthias for thinking he could stand a chance against the snake. In fact, he bet Matthias that if he got the sword, he would give up eating mice (and shrews), as well as apologise to Julian Gingivere, a vegetarian cat who used to be friends with Snow, until he banned Snow from his home because of his manners and taste in food. Matthias, after a brief return to the Abbey, set off on an expedition to find the sword, with help from the Guosim. They followed Asmodeus to the large quarry. There, Matthias found the sword, and in a fierce battle with the snake, decapitated him. Meanwhile, Cornflower discovered Martin's old battle-armour in an abbey attic.

Throughout this period, Cluny had been using various tactics to try to take over Redwall, including tunnelling in, using a battering ram, blackmailing a spice-merchant dormouse to kidnap Cornflower as ransom, burning the gates, using a siege tower, and sneaking his soldiers in with a visiting local circus. Every single time the rats failed, and Cluny began to show signs of insanity.

While Matthias was away gathering more troops to fight the rats, Cluny forced a dormouse he had captured to sneak into Redwall and open the gates from the inside. Cluny and his army entered the Abbey at last. However, Matthias came back, dressed in Martin's armour, alongside an army of shrews and sparrows that he had gathered. He found that Cluny had taken over, and was about to execute all the Redwallers (starting with Cornflower). The sight of Matthias dressed as the mouse he had seen in his dreams terrified Cluny, who sent his troops against Matthias and his army. During the ensuing battle between Cluny's army and the mixed defenders of Redwall (The Defenders of Redwall, the Guosim, and the Sparra), Cluny kidnapped Cornflower and hid in the belltower. When Matthias followed them in, Cluny ambushed him, and a duel began, which led them both up to the top of the belltower. Cluny jumped down and caught Cornflower again, threatening to kill her if Mathias did not come down to face him. Mathias swore to, if Cluny released her. Cluny released Cornflower, but Matthias cut the bellropes, causing the Abbey-bell to crash down onto Cluny, killing him instantly.

In the aftermath of the battle, Abbot Mortimer was fatally wounded. Before he died, he declared Matthias to be the Abbey warrior, and that Cornflower would be his wife.

In the epilogue, we see how life in Redwall is back to normal. The Sparra are now ruled by Warbeak who is a good ruler, and the Sparra are now friends with the Redwallers. Some of the Guosim Shrews have chosen to stay at Redwall, and have become beekeepers (even learning to speak to the bees, so they can argue with them). The new abbot is brother Mordalfus, previously known as brother Alf, who used to run the Abbey Pond. Matthias and Cornflower are now happily married and have a son, named Mattimeo (which is somehow short for Matthias Methuselah Mortimer (possibly MATThIas MEthuselah mOrtimer)). The new Abbey Recorder, John Churchmouse, signs off saying that the gates of Redwall are always open to travellers, inviting the viewer to visit if they are ever passing.

=== Mattimeo ===
Several seasons after the death of Cluny, Matthias and Cornflower had a son, Mattimeo. But one night, as the Redwallers were celebrating, they were interrupted by the masked fox, Slagar the Cruel, who was previously known as Chickenhound, who entered Redwall with a band of rodents, drugged everyone and kidnapped all of their children. Matthias, Basil Stag Hare and Jess headed out to save them, gaining new and old allies along the way, such as Orlando the Axe, the Guosim shrews, and the "Sparra".

Meanwhile, in their absence, things started to go wrong for Redwall. It came under attack by ravens, led by General Ironbeak. The ravens took all of their food and the dormitories, leaving Cavern Hole as the only free location. However, the Redwallers struck back by using Martin's armor as a ghost to scare the raven. They later saved a mountain bird named Stryk Redkite, who was being harassed and later hurt by the ravens. Eventually, Ironbeak figured out their little trick after seeing Constance the badger going to put away Martin's armour. He locked her in the gatehouse and had his troops take Cavern Hole. Constance was able to break out and save the Redwallers as a newly recovered Stryk killed Ironbeak. The other ravens left Redwall.

Matthias and company were able to follow Slagar's trail to an old buried abbey, Loamhedge, where a cult of rats who worshiped Malkariss, were enslaving others. The fight ended with the slaves stoning Malkariss to death and Matthias setting them free. Eventually, they won with the abbey sinking into the earth. At the surface, Slagar tried to get back at Matthias for the death of his mother but ended up falling into the hole from which he escaped.

Company returned to Redwall with the young ones and slaves. After seven seasons, things were going peacefully at Redwall. The slaves of Malkariss and Matthias' companions settled in Redwall. Matthias, Basil and Orlando began training Redwall's next generation of defenders.

=== Martin the Warrior ===
At the same seventh season after Matthias returned, the Redwallers listen to Tim Churchmouse, who tells the tale of how their hero, Martin, became the warrior he is known as today. In the lands of the Marshank coast, the terrible Badrang the Tyrant was increasing his piracy attacks, forcing Luke the Warrior, Martin's father, to go out to sea to combat the sea rats. He left his son his sword and told him to never let another creature take it. Years later, Martin was captured by Badrang and his sword taken. The young mouse served many years in the fortress of Marshank as a slave. When he defended an old squirrel named Barkjon, Badrang had him hung outside in the rain with hungry gulls to peck at him and was later put in the prison pit with Barkjon's son, Felldoh, and a mouse named Brome. Meanwhile, Badrang's old shipmate, Tramun Clogg, arrived to take Marshank. Brome's sister, Laterose, also known as Rose, and her friend, the mole Grumm, also arrived and began digging their way into the prison pit while Clogg began his siege. The five made it to Clogg's boats and managed to commandeer one. However, the boat had a hole, flooding it. A raging storm and a fish separated the group. Martin, Rose and Grumm ended up captured by pygmy shrews and met a hedgehog by the name of Pallum. After saving Queen Amballa's son, Dinjer, they were free to go to Noonvale, Rose's home.

Meanwhile, Brome and Felldoh washed up somewhere else, meeting the Rosehip Players, a traveling circus who agreed to help them free the slaves of Marshank. Managing to win Clogg's amusement, they got inside Marshank and freed most of the slaves. A few days later, Brome disguised himself as one of the rats to get inside, and freed the other slaves through the prison pit's tunnel.

En route to Noonvale, the company made many friends, such as the Warden of Marshwood Hill and Boldred the owl and enemies like the uncivilized cannibalistic lizards and the rogue Gawtrybe. With help from the shrews and otters, they made it to Noonvale but were unable to raise an army to defeat Badrang. However, many were drawn to Martin's cause, including the Gawtrybe as he made his way to Marshank.

Clogg took his opportunity to capture Marshank while Badrang was out. However, Badrang knew of the tunnel in the prison pit. He had Clogg's soldiers swear allegiance to him while Clogg became Marshank's one man slave operation. Felldoh became so obsessed with Marshank's fall that he began solo attacks against it. When he faced Badrang head-to-head, he was beaten to death by his minions. It wasn't until Martin arrived with his army that he forced Badrang into a corner. Martin's army burned down Marshank's gate, and began their attack. In the confusion, Martin retrieved his father's sword and slew Badrang with it. Unfortunately, Badrang had stabbed and killed Rose during the battle. The Fur and Freedom Fighters returned to Noonvale, where it will remain a secret, while Martin continued on his own path.

== Episodes ==
Season	Book	Episodes	Originally released	
Season	Book	Episodes	First released	Last released
1	Redwall	13	September 8, 1999	October 8, 1999
2	Mattimeo	13	November 4, 2000	January 21, 2001
3	Martin the Warrior	13	December 3, 2001	February 25, 2002

== Voice cast ==
=== Redwall ===
- Tyrone Savage as Matthias — The main character, a young orphaned mouse who was raised as a novice among the monks at Redwall Abbey since he was young. Cluny the Scourge murdered his parents and he was the only one in the abbey to recognize the evil rat. The arrival of Cluny provokes Matthias to take action to defend Redwall and find the legendary sword of Martin the Warrior, the founder of Redwall Abbey and its order. Matthias is kind, noble and courageous.
- Alison Pill as Cornflower — A young, pretty fieldmouse and Matthias' love interest. Dutiful, brave and level-headed, Cornflower is loyal to Matthias and helps him in his search for Martin the Warrior's sword and armor.
- Janet Wright as Constance — The badger mother of Redwall Abbey. She is feared by Cluny's army because of her fierce anger, brute strength and stout courage. She is tough, yet loyal and cares for Redwall and the residents under her care. She supports Matthias's decision to fight against Cluny.
- Chris Wiggins as Abbot Mortimer — The stern mouse leader of the Redwall monks who raised Matthias. A pragmatic pacifist, Abbot Mortimer despises fighting and is against the idea of Matthias' quest to find Martin's armor and sword. Only after experiencing Cluny's numerous attempts to invade Redwall does the Father Abbot give in to the decision to fight to protect Redwall. He is mortally wounded by Cluny's forces during the final battle and gives Matthias his blessing as Redwall's protector and Cornflower's husband with his dying breath.
- Richard Binsley as Basil Stag Hare — A feisty and courageous hare who assists Matthias in defending Redwall. His character was based on Brian Jacques' boss, a retired Army captain.
- Wayne Robson as Methuselah — The ancient but kindly historian of Redwall who helped raise Matthias. He is the only monk in the Abbey to recognize Matthias as the descendant of Martin the Warrior and Redwall's protector. He was injured by Chickenhound and died several days later of the wounds he sustained.
- Diego Matamoros as Cluny the Scourge — The main antagonist, a fierce and unrelenting rat warmonger who wants to seize control of Redwall. Cluny was responsible for the destruction of Matthias' village and the loss of his family. He is strong, quick and cunning. He has a barbed steel claw dipped with poison at the end of his tail, which he uses to kill his enemies and anyone who disobeys his orders.
- David Hemblen as Asmodeus Poisonteeth — A villainous adder who terrorizes Mossflower Wood. He keeps Martin's sword in his lair.
- Susan Roman as Jess Squirrel — A clever, crafty and helpful red squirrel and a compatriot of Basil Stag Hare. She is Sam Squirrel's mother.
- Graham Haley as Foremole — The mole foreman of Redwall Abbey who uses his expert tunnelling skills to assist the Redwallers in their defense against Cluny.
- John Stocker as Brother Alf — The caretaker of Redwall Abbey's pond, a skilled fisherman and Abbot Mortimer's successor.
- Tracey Moore as Warbeak Sparra - A young sparrow from the Sparra tribe. At first hostile, she befriends Matthias and helps him escape from her tyrannical uncle, King Bull Sparra. As a result, Warbeak becomes one of Matthias' most loyal allies.
- Marion Day as Guosim - The matriarch of the Guosim shrew tribe. She accompanies Matthias to Asmodeus' lair.
- Bruce Dow as Log-a-Log - An argumentative but loyal shrew who accompanies Matthias to Asmodeus' lair. After Guosim's death, he becomes the patriarch of the Guosim shrew tribe.
- Julie Lemieux as Sela Vixen — A fox healer who resides in Mossflower Wood, she also double-deals in information and is hired to heal Cluny after he sustains injuries in one of his attacks on Redwall. She and her son Chickenhound steal false battle plans, which leads to her death.
- Jonathan Wilson as Chickenhound — Sela's son and accomplice. He survives being disposed of by Cluny's soldiers and makes his way to Redwall under the guise of bringing knowledge of an attack on the abbey, but uses it to loot valuables; when Methuselah tries to raise the alarm, he strikes the mouse with his bag of spoils and escapes into Mossflower.
- Lawrence Bayne as Fangburn, Killconey — Two of Cluny's most trusted members of his army.
- Keith Knight as Squire Julian Gingivere — A massive cat that lives in a run-down barn in Mossflower Wood. He is actually vegetarian and detests the taste of mice. Julian assists Matthias in his quest for the sword of Martin the Warrior.
- Dan Hennessey as Ragear — An ineffectual rat in Cluny's army, prone to blundering any and every mission given to him. He is the first character to be killed by Asmodeus.
- Alyson Court as Myrtle — A character created for the television series, she is Matthias' older sister and rescues him from their burning home after Cluny's attack on their village. Myrtle travels through the winter to get them both safely to Redwall Abbey, but dies of fatigue shortly after their arrival.

=== Mattimeo ===
- Tim Curry as Slagar the Cruel — A villainous fox slavetrader, revealed to be a maimed and delusional Chickenhound.
- Michael Seater as Mattimeo — Matthias and Cornflower's young son.
- Tyrone Savage as Matthias
- Melissa McIntyre as Cornflower
- Janet Wright as Constance
- John Stocker as Abbot Mordalfus
- Richard Binsley as Basil Stag Hare
- Wayne Best as General Ironbeak — An evil raven who plans to conquer Redwall, Jabez Stump — A hedgehog who is head of a large family.
- Susan Roman as Jess Squirrel
- Graham Haley as Foremole
- Tracey Moore as Warbeak Sparra
- Bruce Dow as Log-a-Log
- Catherine Disher as Winifred Otter
- Jake Goldsbie as Vitch — A young rat whose short stature allowed him to pass for a mouse while spying at Redwall.
- Kyle Fairlie as Cheek — An orphaned otter who is quite mischievous. He joins Matthias and his friends on their journey to find the missing Abbey children. Basil grows fond of him and eventually adopts him.
- Sarah Gadon as Cynthia — a young vole who cries, Tess - A young female mouse and Tim Churchmouse's sister. She falls in love with Mattimeo.
- Kristin Fairlie as Auma — A young female badger and Orlando's daughter.
- Paul Soles as Ambrose Spike — A wizened hedgehog who brews beverages in the cellar of Redwall.
- Ali Mukaddam as Jubilation "Jube" Stump — The only son of Jabez the hedgehog. He is the youngest of eleven children, with the others all being girls. He received his name from the cry of joy his father made when he learned he finally had a son.
- Alex House as Sam — Jess Squirrel's son. He can now speak and is as fearless as his mother.
- Fiona Reid as Sister May — A mouse who is in charge of Redwall's infirmary. She helps nurse Stryk Redkite back to health and as a result the bird becomes fiercely protective of her.
- Anthony Bekenn as Orlando the Axe — A courageous and fierce badger warrior and Auma's widower father. He assists Matthias and his group in tracking down Slagar the Cruel.

=== Martin the Warrior ===
- Amos Crawley as Martin — A brave young mouse who is the son of a warrior named Luke. He was captured and enslaved by Badrang as a child but eventually escapes, vowing to bring an end to the stoat's tyranny and free the other prisoners.
- Lindsey Connell as Rose — A beautiful mouse maiden with a talent for singing and imitating bird calls. She joins Martin in his quest to free the slaves of Marshank and becomes the love of his life.
- Diego Matamoros as Badrang — An evil stoat who rules from his fortress called Marshank. He is a ruthless and cunning tyrant with dreams of building an empire.
- John Stocker as Tramun Clogg — A stoat corsair who is captain of a ship known as the Seascarab. Formerly a friend of Badrang, the two have become bitter enemies.
- Graham Haley as Grumm — A mole friend of Rose who travels with her to Marshank to find her missing brother, Brome.
- Ali Mukaddam as Felldoh — An intense and defiant squirrel who grew up as a slave in Marshank. The cruel treatment he and his father Barkjon suffered there led him to be filled with hatred toward Badrang.
- Luca Perlman as Brome — Rose's little brother who wandered away from their home, Noonvale, and ended up imprisoned at Marshank. He idolizes Felldoh but becomes disturbed as the squirrel's anger at Badrang begins to consume him.
- Tracey Moore as Queen Amballa — The eccentric ruler of a tribe of pygmy shrews who initially imprisons Martin and his friends but becomes an ally when they rescue her son Dinjer from a gannet.
- Noah Reid as Keyla — An otter imprisoned at Marshank who aides Martin, Felldoh and Brome in escaping and is the leader of the slave rebellion in their absence.
- Jonathan Wilson as Skalrag — A conniving fox who serves as a spy for Badrang.

== Telecast and home media ==
Redwall was originally aired on Teletoon (now as "Cartoon Network") in Canada, along with being independently distributed in the U.S. by American Public Television through public television stations. As of 2024, the show is currently streaming on Amazon.

The series has been released on VHS and DVD in five languages: English, French, German, Russian and Arabic. In the U.S., all three seasons were released on DVD by Funimation, while in Canada distribution was handled by Kaboom Entertainment, and then, Sony Pictures Home Entertainment re-issued Redwall: The Adventures Begin and other series on July 1, 2016. In the United Kingdom, FremantleMedia, Abbey Home Media (through its Tempo Video label) and Just Entertainment Ltd released the series on VHS and DVD. In Australia, MRA Entertainment Group and Eagle Entertainment released several volumes of the series. In Germany, m2 Verlag GmbH - Best Entertainment and Pidax have both released all volumes of the series on DVD. In France, StudioCanal released the first two seasons on DVD.

=== VHS ===
		Episodes
Redwall: The Movie	UK: 1999; NA: December 31, 2000	An abridged version of the first season of Redwall edited to a feature-length running time.
Redwall: Treachery	UK: September 25, 2000	Contains episodes 1-3 of season 1.
Redwall: Sparra's Kingdom	UK: February 26, 2001	Contains episodes 4-6 of season 1.
Redwall: Captain Snow	UK: June 4, 2001	Contains episodes 7-9 of season 1.
Redwall: The Final Conflict	UK: September 17, 2001	Contains episodes 10-13 of season 1.
Redwall: The Adventure Begins	NA: 2002	Contains episodes 1-4 of season 1.
Redwall: Cluny's Clowns	NA: 2002	Contains episodes 5-6 of season 1.
Redwall: The Search for Martin's Sword	NA: 2002	Contains episodes 7-8 of season 1.
Redwall: The Visitor	NA: 2002	Contains episodes 9-10 of season 1.
Redwall: The Final Conflict	NA: 2002	Contains episodes 11-13 of season 1.

=== DVD ===
DVD name	Release dates			Episodes
DVD name	Region 2	Region 1	Region 4	Episodes
Redwall: The Movie	November 25, 2002	November 22, 2005		An abridged version of the first season of Redwall edited to a feature-length running time.
Redwall: The Adventure Begins		June 24, 2003		Contains episodes 1-6 of season 1. (Note: Re-released in region 1 on March 9, 2010 by Phase 4 Film's Kaboom! Entertainment label.)
Redwall: The Next Adventure		April 13, 2004		Contains episodes 7-13 of season 1. (Note: Re-released in region 1 on April 12, 2011 by Phase 4 Film's Kaboom! Entertainment label.)
Mattimeo: Slagar the Slaver	May 10, 2004			Contains episodes 1-4 of season 2.
Mattimeo: To Be a Warrior	September 13, 2004			Contains episodes 5-8 of season 2.
Mattimeo: The Abyss	May 9, 2005			Contains episodes 9-13 of season 2.
Redwall: The Siege		May 24, 2005		Contains episodes 1-4 of season 1.
Redwall: Friends and Foes		August 23, 2005		Contains episodes 5-7 of season 1.
Redwall: Volumes 1-4			2006	Contains all episodes from season 1 across four separate volumes.
Redwall: Volumes 5-8			2006	Contains all episodes from season 2 across four separate volumes.
Redwall: Season One		February 21, 2006		Contains all 13 episodes from season 1.
Mattimeo, A Tale of Redwall: Season Two		May 23, 2006		Contains all 13 episodes from season 2.
Martin the Warrior, A Tale of Redwall: Season Three		August 22, 2006		Contains all 13 episodes from season 3.
Redwall: Cluny the Scourge	June 9, 2008			Contains episodes 1-3 of season 1.
Redwall: Cluny's Clowns	June 29, 2009			Contains episodes 4-8 of season 1.
