= The Sable Quean =

2011 novel by Brian Jacques

- UK first edition cover
- Author: Brian Jacques
- Illustrator: Sean Rubin
- Language: English
- Series: Redwall
- Release number: 21
- Genre: Fantasy novel
- Publisher: Philomel Books
- Publication date: February 23, 2010
- Publication place: United Kingdom
- Media type: Print (Hardback & Paperback)
- Preceded by: Doomwyte
- Followed by: The Rogue Crew

The Sable Quean is the 21st novel in the Redwall series by Brian Jacques, and the last to be published before his death on February 5, 2011 (a twenty-second novel, The Rogue Crew, was released in May 2011). It is illustrated by Sean Rubin. It was to be originally released in autumn 2009, but the release date was moved to January 2010, and then later delayed a second time to February 23, 2010. The mass market paperback edition was released on April 26, 2011.

== Book divisions ==
- Book 1: Travel is an Adventure!
- Book 2: Go Find the Babes!
- Book 3: Escape from Althier!
- Book 4: The Battle of Redwall Abbey

== Plot ==
Young Buckler Kordyne, a hare of the Long Patrol army, has a discussion with his ruler Brang Forgefire, Badger Lord of the mountain Salamandastron. Buckler is bored with mountain life, so Brang suggests that he visits Redwall Abbey to deliver some new bellropes to the Abbess (Brang had accidentally broken the ropes last time he was there); while Buckler visits the Abbey, he can also visit his brother on his farm, which is nearby. Buckler agrees, taking along with him his gluttonous friend, Subaltern Diggs.

At Redwall Abbey, a music contest for the position of Bard of Redwall is being organized; however two Dibbuns (toddlers) disappear in the process. The duo, a mole and a squirrel, had wandered outside to the woodlands to picnic, but a waiting band of vermin "Ravagers" bound, gagged, and carried them off before anyone could notice their absence. One of the Ravagers, Globby, is overcome by the temptation of Redwall food and attempts to break inside the kitchens; however, he is captured by the otter Skipper Ruark, who punishes the miscreant by forcing him to clean up the mess he had made by his burglary. In the hue and cry raised when the two Dibbuns were discovered missing, Globby escapes the kitchens and flees to the attics, using a pilfered kitchen knife as a weapon. In the attempt to recapture and interrogate him, both he and the squirrel Brother Tollum are slain.

In Mossflower Woods, Buckler and Diggs hear two vermin from the Ravager horde trying to capture a young shrewmaid named Flib. Diggs knocks the vermin unconscious, and the two hares sit down to eat, ignoring the shrew because of her ingratitude. After she finally relents, and shares food with them, Buckler deals with the two vermin, tying them to each other and sending them off. Not heeding his advice, they return later with some of their Ravager buddies to spy on the group. Flib, Diggs, and Buckler join forces with a musical traveling group of hedgehogs, voles, and moles, who are also on their way to Redwall. When Flib and two of the younger hedgehogs sleep outside the performing company's raft, on the riverbank, they are captured by the Ravagers.

As it turns out, many young ones have been captured by the Ravagers, led by Zwilt the Shade and Vilaya, both evil sables. They are keeping the hostages in the remains of Brockhall (a place under an immense old tree), which they have renamed Althier, and are planning to use the captives to force Redwall to surrender to their demands. Several of the captive young ones, led by Flandor the otter, Tura the squirrel, and Flib's younger sister Midda, try without success to figure out a workable escape plan. Many of the young ones are in despair, and would rather concentrate on where their next meal is coming from than ways to get out.

Meeting up with the Guosim shrews led by Flib's father Jango Bigboat, Buckler, Diggs, and the performing company proceed to Redwall. Abbess Marjoram discusses the position with Buckler and several others, who agree to lead a force into Mossflower to search for the young ones. The first search attempt yields the Redwallers with one Ravager captive, and Buckler's badly wounded and almost delirious sister-in-law Clarinna. She informs Buckler that his brother Clerun was brutally slain by Zwilt the Shade, and that her two little children have been taken by the Ravagers. Before Buckler and his searchers can set out again, the Ravagers, led by Vilaya and Zwilt, show up in force at Redwall, and make their demands for surrender. Diggs attempts to use his vermin captive, Gripchun, as a hostage to turn the tables, but Zwilt merely has the unfortunate prisoner shot with arrows. The Ravagers then retreat, saying they will return, and that the Redwallers should prepare to surrender to them.

Meanwhile, in Vilaya and Zwilt's absence, Flib has roused the captive toddlers and young ones into digging an escape tunnel in secret. She and two very young, inexperienced moles help her dig, but their tunnel caves in, which collapses part of the prison chamber and traps the trio in the landslide. However, a warrior mole called Axtel happens across the remains of their tunnel and digs them out. After hearing Flib recount the position the other babes are in, Axtel leaves her a spear and instructs her to watch over the two molebabes, while he digs back into Althier to get the rest. Soon after he leaves, Flib encounters two fox Ravagers, but slays one with the spear and runs the other off with a whip. A kind watervole, Mumzy, who has been watching and knows there are other Ravagers about, moves the trio of young ones from Axtel's campsite to her concealed bankside home nearby.

By now, Vilaya has returned, and ordered the young ones to be moved to another prison cave on the other side of Althier; this one has rock walls instead of dirt, and cannot be dug out of easily. She attacks Midda, trying to get her to reveal information about the tunnel, but soon finds herself badly beaten by Flandor, who damages her eye with his rudder-like tail. In rage, the Sable Quean stabs the young otter with a poisoned blade she wears in a phial about her neck, slaying him. She then sends Zwilt and some Ravagers out to hunt for the escapees, and the prison guards, who have deserted.

Axtel, digging his way into Althier, barges into the new prison cave, managing to rescue the toddlers Tassy and Borti. The Ravagers, stopping the other babes from escaping, wound the warrior mole badly by stabbing him through the footpaw, but he manages to limp away with the two babes, blocking his escape route with a boulder so as not to be followed. Upon getting above ground again, Tassy tries to help heal Axtel's footpaw. The trio find Buckler and the search party from Redwall, who have set out again. They also meet up with Mumzy, who leads them to her home and the other three escaped young ones.

Back in Althier, an infant mouse quite accidentally discovers a hidden rift in the rock, which leads to a natural cave system behind the wall. Seizing the opportunity, the entire pack of young ones, now led by Midda and Tura, flee down the tunnel, blocking the rift with soil and rocks behind them. Vilaya soon discovers the absence of her prisoners; killing the stoat who was supposed to be on guard duty, she orders the Ravagers to unblock the rift and get after the young ones. Zwilt returns to Althier then, and demands to know what is going on. The ensuing argument causes a rift between the two sables, who split forces when they manage to enter the caves; Zwilt takes a group in one direction, while Vilaya takes hers in the other. Vilaya, now knowing she cannot trust Zwilt, sends her old rat confidante to spy on him. Zwilt, however, has other plans; he orders one of his biggest soldiers to strangle the helpless rat before she can report back to Vilaya. This action, once Vilaya hears of it, causes the two sables to become deadly enemies.

Buckler, meanwhile, has taken the entire Guosim shrew force and most of the able-bodied creatures from Redwall, planning to storm Althier, as they now know its location thanks to the warrior Axtel. By the time they get there, both the young ones and the Ravagers have gotten far down the tunnels, leaving no sign as to where they have gone. The group searches Althier from end to end with no success; during the search, Diggs becomes separated from the rest and is soon lost in Althier without a torch.

Vilaya and her force catch up with Zwilt's above ground. Neither sable has succeeded in finding the runaways. The two sables battle, and Zwilt stabs Vilaya with his broadsword; she falls unconscious with the pain. Thinking Vilaya is dead, Zwilt prepares to cut off her head as a warning to other vermin, but one of the Ravager stoats (a female named Gliv) urges him not to, saying it would be a bad omen. As the other Ravagers march off to make war on Redwall, Gliv is left behind with instructions to bury Vilaya; however, knowing that the Sable Quean is still alive, she nurses her back to health, and instructs her to follow Zwilt and slay him. Vilaya cruelly repays her rescuer by slaying her with the poisoned dagger, deciding that she can better do the job alone.

The escapees by now have reached the surface; but their freedom is short-lived, as an insane hedgehog named Triggut Frap imprisons them on his pike-surrounded watermeadow island, intending to use them as slaves to build him a proper house. However, Diggs arrives, along with a huge young female badger named Ambrevina Rockflash that met up with him on the way. Ambrevina was a friend of the young otter Flandor, and is seeking his whereabouts. When Midda informs her of his murder by Vilaya, the badger swears to avenge him.

Leaving the young ones in Mumzy's care, Diggs and Ambrevina return to Redwall, as Buckler and the other group did upon hearing that Zwilt and the Ravagers were headed there. They join in the battle against the Ravagers' battering ram at the front gate, not knowing that Zwilt and four of his soldiers are attempting to force a secret entrance open from the back. After the battering ram plot is foiled, a prolonged siege ensues. Diggs, relieved of guard duty, heads off to the kitchens to find a bite to eat. What he ends up finding is Zwilt, who has just managed to get in. Badly wounding the young hare, and causing Diggs to lose his ear and his memory in the process, the sable flees into Great Hall, but encounters Abbess Marjoram, Buckler's sister-in-law Clarinna, and several other Abbey females. Before he and his four soldiers can do any harm, Buckler appears on the scene. In the fantastic sword duel that ensues, Zwilt realizes he has finally met a beast who is more than his match. Taking a nearby baby hostage, he commands the young hare to surrender; offering to give his life for the babe, Buckler does. Having his soldiers pin the young hare to the stairs, Zwilt attempts to behead him. However, Clarinna comes up behind him and runs him through with the Sword of Martin, which had been hanging on the wall nearby. Abbess Marjoram tells Buckler when he offered to give his life for the babe he did something far braver than slaying Zwilt. The four soldiers flee, but do not escape, as a berserk Axtel takes care of them once and for all.

Meanwhile, outside the Abbey walls, Vilaya has resumed control of the Ravagers; the Redwallers, however, with the aid of Ambrevina and the Guosim, soundly rout the vermin, forcing the remainder into a scattered retreat. Vilaya flees, alone, but Ambrevina follows her, intent on avenging Flandor. Just as she catches up with Vilaya, the sable trips the badger with her cloak, hoping to throw her off. This proves to be her undoing, as Ambrevina falls right on top of the Sable Quean; the force causes the poison phial necklace to break, the shards piercing Vilaya and slaying her. Weeping for Flandor, Ambrevina returns to Redwall.

Diggs, who has completely forgotten who he is and now believes himself to be a colonel in the Long Patrol, wanders away from the Abbey, but returns in company with Mumzy and the freed captives. After having his memory restored by a friend's hitting him hard on the head, Diggs, in company with Buckler and Ambrevina, returns to Salamandastron. The two young hares then report to Lord Brang the adventurous outcome of their 'little visit' to Redwall.

Preceded by Doomwyte	Redwall series (publication order)	Succeeded by The Rogue Crew
