= Doomwyte =

2008 novel by Brian Jacques

- UK first edition cover
- Author: Brian Jacques
- Illustrator: David Elliot
- Cover artist: Troy Howell
- Language: English
- Series: Redwall
- Release number: 20
- Genre: Fantasy novel
- Publisher: Puffin Books
- Publication date: 2 October 2008
- Publication place: United Kingdom
- Media type: Print (hardback and paperback)
- Pages: 400 pp (first edition)
- ISBN: 978-0-14-138437-5
- Preceded by: Eulalia!
- Followed by: The Sable Quean

Doomwyte is the 20th novel in the Redwall series by Brian Jacques. It was released on 2 October 2008 in the United Kingdom and on 16 October 2008 in the United States.

== Book divisions (English) ==
- Book 1: The Raven
- Book 2: A Prince's Descendants
- Book 3: Baliss

== Plot ==
The Eurasian magpie Griv, resting from a storm just outside a window, listens to the story the young mouse Bisky is telling, about how his ancestor Gonff the Mousethief stole four great jewels from the Great Doomwyte Idol. However, the listeners, all fellow youngsters and Dibbuns, disbelieve the story. The young Redwallers have a pillowfight which the Eurasian red squirrel Dwink (who was especially sceptical of Bisky's tale) started. Griv leaves for the lair of the Doomwytes, of which she is a member, and tells the Wytes' leader, Korvus Skurr the common raven, about the jewels.

Bisky and Dwink are caught in their fight by the infirmary keeper Brother Torilis, who reports them to Abbot Glisam. While reporting to Abbot Glisam, Bisky tells him of his story. Samolus Fixa, a relative of Bisky's, overhears them and confirms to Glisam that there is truth in Bisky's story. Samolus, Bisky and Dwink dig through the Abbey records in the gatehouse, coming upon the journal of Lady Columbine (Gonff's wife), Dinny (Gonff's friend) and Gonff himself. All three tell a similar account of Gonff stealing the jewels and offering them to Columbine, who refuses to have them because they have seen too much evil. Gonff then composes riddles to the location of the jewels.

Korvus Skurr and his smooth snake adviser Sicariss hear and believe Griv's story. Thinking that the jewels are within Redwall, Korvus sends crows to kidnap a Redwaller to verify the story. However, a crow is killed by the hare Laird Bosie McScutta of Bowlaynee, and the others subsequently retreat. The Redwallers, having seen this, offer Bosie the position of Abbey Warrior, which he accepts.

Korvus, not giving up, now sends his best warriors, the Ravenwytes. Led by the crow Veeku, the Ravenwytes are much more skilled (and brave) than their crow counterparts, and finally manage to capture a squirrel Dibbun. Fortunately Bosie comes to the rescue again, killing a Ravenwyte. All the Ravenwytes, except one named Tarul, flee in panic.

Korvus then makes a pact with the giant adder Baliss, the descendant of Asmodeus from the first book in the series. Although Baliss is blind, his extraordinary sense of smell and touch compensate for this handicap. Korvus offers all his reptiles to Baliss to eat, in exchange for Baliss's services, which the adder agrees. Luck, however, was not on Korvus's side as Sicariss overhears and begins to distrust him.

The party searching for the jewels, which included Bisky, Dwink, Samolus, Skipper Rorgus, Foremole Gullub Gurrpaw and Gatekeeper Umfry Spikkle, attempt to solve Gonff's riddle, which leads them to the cellar and, from there, to a tunnel. The tunnel eventually splits, and so does the party. Bisky, Rorgus and Umfry go down one, Samolus, Bosie and Dwink go down another, and Foremole Gullub stays behind to guard the rations.

Tarul, having been starved and nearly deafened due to his hiding place near the belltower, finally sees his chance when two Dibbuns come and ring the bells. However, just as Tarul goes between the bells, Sister Violet comes to help and the bells squash Tarul, resulting in his death.

Bisky, Rorgus and Umfry encounter Painted Ones at the end of their tunnel, while Samolus, Bosie and Dwink encounter the owl Aluco down theirs. Aluco uses a green jewel to scare away the Painted Ones, and upon close inspection the jewel is revealed to be an eye to the Doomwyte Idol. Aluco agrees to help them, and the company eludes the Painted Ones and re-enter Redwall. However, Bisky is captured by the Painted Ones.

After Tarul's death, Cellarhog Corksnout Spikkle (Umfry's father) is ordered to dispose of his body. Baliss arrives just as Corksnout is disposing of Tarul. Sensing a quick meal, Baliss attempts to eat Tarul, but instead headbutts Corksnout. Corksnout's spikes are trapped in Baliss's head, festering and infected; Baliss goes insane from the pain and goes after Korvus, whom he blames.

Bisky, in captivity, is quickly irritated by Jeg, the son of Chief Chigid. He is joined by a Guosim shrew, Dubble, who is escaping from his bully father, Log-a-Log Tugga Bruster. Dubble and Bisky escape but are captured almost immediately by a tribe of bickering mice called the Gonfelins, who are descendants of Gonff and therefore Bisky's distant relatives. The two meet Pikehead Nokko, head of the Gonfelins, and he reveals that they have a Doomwyte jewel. Bisky also meets Nokko's daughter Spingo, and they become great friends.

Tugga Bruster and the Guosim arrive at Redwall and are from there guided to the Painted Ones' lair to rescue Bisky and Dubble. Unbeknownst to them, Bisky and Dubble are leading the Gonfelins to the Painted Ones' lair anyway. The Redwallers and the Guosim see Baliss thrashing around in madness due to Corksnout's spikes, and are soon ambushed by the Painted Ones. However, the Gonfelins arrive just then and the Painted Ones are heavily outnumbered. This, coupled with the death of their chief, Chigid, prompts many Painted Ones to surrender. Tala, wife of Chigid, swears revenge to Tugga Bruster, who had killed her husband.

Dubble, upon seeing that Jeg was not with the Painted Ones, chases after him in Mossflower. Jeg had tricked Dwink away from the group and is preparing a fire to burn him when Dubble arrives. After freeing Dwink, Dubble chases after Jeg, and they fight. Before Dubble can kill him, Jeg is eaten by Baliss.

The Redwallers, Guosim and Gonfelins return to Redwall, unbeknownst that Dubble is not with them. Tugga Bruster then gets humiliated by Nokko, and, to get his own, he attempts to steal Aluco's emerald and make it look like Nokko did it. Unfortunately for him he is caught by Dwink, whose footpaw he breaks. However, by that time most of the Abbey had arrived and the Guosim banish Tugga Bruster. After leaving the Abbey, Tugga Bruster is killed by Tala, who was lurking in the ditch by the Abbey.

Dubble goes into a less familiar part of Mossflower and is attacked by carrion crows. A black otter, Zaran the Black, drives them off and allows Dubble to rest in her home. She tells him that she is plotting revenge against Korvus Skurr and the Doomwytes, because it was Korvus who killed her husband and young one. Zaran is digging above the Doomwytes' lair to make it collapse and cave in, suffocating the inhabitants inside.

Baliss has arrived at the Doomwytes' lair and has caved in a single entrance, blocking himself and the Wytes' inside. In a panic, the carrion crows and rooks begin frantically eating their reptilian counterparts, with only Sicariss being spared. Baliss is desperately trying to find cool water to stop his pain momentarily. He finds a lake, and is attacked by Welzz, Korvus Skurr's giant pet catfish. Baliss kills him in defence.

Bisky and Spingo steal a Guosim logboat to sail down the River Moss and attempt to find Dubble. They find him and Zaran above the Doomwytes' lair, doing their tunnelling operation. Bisky and Spingo join but Spingo gets buried alive in a depression. Zaran makes holes for her to breathe while Bisky and Dubble return to Redwall for help.

At the abbey, Dwink, Rorgus and Foremole are joined in their search by Perrit, a female squirrel. Gonff's next clue frequently cites "Friar's Grace" which turns out to be a clay pot made by Goody Stickle. To Brother Torilis' dismay, the searchers break the pot, revealing another green emerald and the next clue.

Going on, the clue mentions the "wild sweet gatherers home" which turns out to be outside the Abbey. They eventually find loads and loads of bees, and among them, Blodd Apis, a mad, mentally deranged hedgehog. Despite her madness, Apis is very cunning. She manages to get them all drunk on her mead while she is unaffected because she lives on it. She was about to pour wood ants' juice on them to make her bees sting them to death when Foremole, who proved less potent to the drink, smashes the juice on her. The bees then promptly kill Apis. Searching her body, the searchers find another Doomwyte jewel, a ruby this time.

Bisky and Dubble arrive just after Dwink, Rorgus, Foremole and Perrit leave. They inform the Redwallers about the situation above the Doomwytes' lair, and Friar Skurpul leads the moles to the rescue as Deputy Foremole. Bisky and Dubble return with loads of Guosim, Gonfelins and Redwall moles. On the way, Dubble is offered the position of Log-a-log. However, he refuses and gives the title to Garul, an older shrew. The moles manage to successfully rescue Spingo, but Skurpul is buried alive in her place.

Upon seeing the chaos in the Doomwytes' lair, the woodlanders attempt to finish off the dirty work. Bisky, Nokko, Dubble and Bosie attempt to rescue the moles trapped on the ceiling. Four moles fall to their deaths, but the rest are saved.

Korvus then sees that Sicariss was lying to him all along. After killing the smooth snake, he attempts to escape through a recess in the wall. Zaran was too skilled and had worked too hard to be denied by now, and she promptly kills Korvus. Bosie also suffers a serious wound from Veeku and goes into the Bloodwrath, slaying dozens of Wytes. Eventually, the battle is won and the Wytes defeated.

However, Baliss is still in the cave. To trap him there, Gobbo, a member of the Gonfelins, makes a fire at the entrance. Bosie, Zaran, Spingo and the mole Frubb collapse the Doomwytes' lair, crushing Baliss inside.

The party then returns to Redwall, where they have a great feast, mainly composing of Dubble's dishes. The Abbey mourns the death of Skurpul, Ruttur, Rooter and Grabul, the moles who died saving Spingo. Nokko then hands over the last Doomwyte jewel and declares the Gonfelins as citizens of Redwall. Abbot Glisam, seeing that the jewels have seen too much evil, buries them in the memory of the moles on top of the crushed Doomwyte rock.

Seasons later, Perrit becomes Mother Abbess of Redwall, marries Dwink, and has a daughter named Mittee. Zaran marries Rorgus and has Rorzan, a son. Bisky and Spingo marry and have a daughter, Andio, and Dubble becomes head Friar of the Kitchen. Glisam, having retired as Abbot, becomes Abbey Teacher, teaching the illiterate Umfry Spikkle how to read and write.

== Main characters ==
- Bisky
- Dwink
- Samolus Fixa
- Laird Bosie McScutta of Bowlaynee, the first and only hare to be the abbey's champion
- Abbess Perrit
- Dubble
- Spingo
- Pikehead Nokko
- Umfry Spikkle
- Zaran the Black
- Skipper Rorgus
- Foremole Gullub Gurrpaw
- Corksnout Spikkle
- Brother Torilis
- Aluco
- Log-a-log Tugga Bruster, the first and only evil log-a-log of the series
- Korvus Skurr
- Sicariss
- Baliss the Slayer
- Veeku
- Chigid
- Abbot Glisam, the first and only dormouse abbot of the series.
- Blodd Apis, a rare villainous hedgehog
- Jeg, a Painted One rat
- Griv
- Tala, Chigid's wife
- Welzz, a Wels catfish

== Publication history ==
- 2008, United Kingdom, Puffin Books ISBN 978-0-14-138437-5 Pub date 2 October 2008, Hardback
- 2008, United States, Philomel Books ISBN 0-399-24544-8, Pub date 16 October 2008, Hardback

Preceded by Eulalia!	Redwall series (publication order)	Succeeded by The Sable Quean
