= Eulalia! =

2007 novel by Brian Jacques

- UK first edition cover
- Author: Brian Jacques
- Illustrator: David Elliot
- Language: English
- Series: Redwall
- Release number: 19
- Genre: Fantasy novel
- Publication date: October 4, 2007
- Publication place: United Kingdom
- Media type: Print (Hardback & Paperback)
- Preceded by: High Rhulain
- Followed by: Doomwyte

Eulalia! is the 19th book in the Redwall children's fantasy novel series by author Brian Jacques and illustrated by David Elliot. "Eulalia" ("Victory") is also the war cry used by the fighting hares and badgers in the Redwall series.

The novel was going to be released in 2006 (to continue the pattern that a new Redwall book is released every year), but was delayed. It was released on October 4, 2007 in the US and UK. Brian Jacques attended a book signing for Eulalia! in Newark, Delaware's Borders on Sunday, October 14 and again in Minneapolis, Minnesota's Wild Rumpus on October 27.

== Summary ==
In the far, cold Northern Isles, the red fox captain Vizka Longtooth and his Sea Raiders plunder a lonely farmhouse where the young Eurasian badger Gorath and his grandparents live. Vizka knocks Gorath unconscious with his chain and mace and puts him on board his ship, the Bludgullet. Vizka's brother Codj locks the two old badgers in the house and sets it on fire.

US cover of Eulalia!

Meanwhile, at the mountain stronghold Salamandastron, the Badger Lord Asheye has foreseen that an unknown badger (which turns out to be Gorath) will succeed him in autumn. He sends a young European brown hare, "Mad" Maudie, to search for the badger. After a series of events, Maudie finds herself trapped by sand lizards. At the same time, a young European hedgehog called Orkwil Prink is expelled from Redwall Abbey due to thieving.

Meanwhile, the captured Gorath swears to kill Codj for the deaths of his grandparents, and the crew soon realize Gorath is a dangerous beast when he kills a taunting least weasel. The ambitious Vizka decides to recruit Gorath into his crew. Maudie, meanwhile, has been rescued from the sand lizards by a long-eared owl named Asio Bardwing. He agrees to lead her to the Guosim common shrews who will take her to Redwall, where Lord Asheye ordered her to go. They locate the Guosim; however, Asio is killed rescuing a baby shrew from an adder.

Vizka soon realizes that Gorath would rather die than join his crew, so he simply starves him. However, before Gorath dies, Codj captures Orkwil Prink, who befriends Gorath. Being a thief, Orkwil soon frees himself and Gorath. During the escape, Gorath kills Codj, thereby avenging his grandparents.

Maudie and the Guosim are being tagged by another vermin band: the Brownrats, headed by the fat Gruntan Kurdly, who wanted the Guosim's logboats. They meet up with Barbowla the otter, his holt, and the squirrel Rangval the Rogue. A baby shrew is kidnapped by the Brownrats; Maudie and the Log-a-Log (leader) of the Guosim rescue him, but the Log-a-Log is killed in the process.

Gorath and Orkwil have made it to Redwall and have warned Abbot Daucus and Skipper Rorc of the approaching Sea Raiders. They are then joined by Rangval, Barbowla and his otters and the Guosim. Maudie appears later, bringing the baby shrew and the news that the Log-a-Log was killed. His son becomes the new Log-a-Log and swears revenge on the Brownrats.

Vizka had captured a mean vole and ordered him to disguise himself to gain entrance to Redwall, which he wants to conquer. This scheme fails, and the vole is captured by the Redwallers. Vizka then decides to tunnel his way in. However, his crew encounters the scouts of the Brownrats, who chase them to the north. Gorath has seen Vizka besieging the Abbey and gets restless. He escapes during the middle of a feast and Orkwil, Rangval and Maudie set out in search of him. However, just as they were leaving, the vole kills a Sister of Redwall, steals the Sword of Martin the Warrior and runs off.

Gorath, who is in the grip of a berserk rage, sweeps in on a horde of Brownrats, killing dozens. Soon afterwards, one of Vizka's Sea Raiders encounters the vole. He kills him, steals the sword and heads back to Vizka's force. Orkwil, Rangval and Maudie find the vole's body. Vizka, who is nearby, hears the trio talking and captures them. A little later, the Sea Raider with Martin's sword returns to Vizka, who promptly kills him because he wants the sword. Vizka leaves with his horde, telling 3 vermin to guard Maudie and her companions; however, the haremaid and her friends easily overpower them and escape, knowing that Vizka has Martin's sword.

Gorath faints after the berserk rage leaves him. When he comes round, he finds himself in company with two badgers: the young female Salixa and her mentor the Tabura. They return to Redwall, where Gorath and Salixa leave the Tabura. The two young badgers, who are both falling in love with each other, head out looking for Vizka and his crew. The duo soon are surrounded by the vermin on top of a plateau with the Guosim, Barbowla and no rations. Maudie, Orkwil and Rangval, disguised as vermin, join Gorath's army on the plateau. In the process of sneaking up to it, at some point they lose Orkwil; Maudie and Rangval make it to Gorath's force, however.

Gruntan Kurdly, meanwhile, has been killed by a swan. Vizka takes control of the Brownrats and orders them to besiege the plateau. Just as Gorath's army is about to be annihilated, Orkwil reappears leading a horde of Redwallers. They kill the Brownrats and the Sea Raiders, but Vizka and five vermin escape. Gorath pursues Vizka through Mossflower Woods. Vizka's vermin desert him after he killed one for laughing at him, and Vizka returns to the Bludgullet, anchored in the River Moss. However, Gorath is already there and kills Vizka in an amazing fight with his friends watching. The Bludgullet is renamed the Eulalia and Gorath, Salixa, Orkwil, Maudie, Rangval and the Guosim sail down the River Moss to Salamandastron, where Lord Asheye gives the title of Badger Lord to Gorath.

In the celebrations that follow, Lord Asheye realizes that it is near autumn and that he must depart Salamandastron. To cheer Asheye up, Salixa sings a song that the Tabura composed. Asheye suddenly recognizes the song, and realizes the Tabura is his long-lost brother Melutar. Asheye and his friend Major Mullein sail to Redwall.

Gorath and Salixa marry, and have a daughter named Rowanbloom.

== Book divisions (English) ==
- Book 1: Longtooth's Prisoner
- Book 2: A Thief Absolved
- Book 3: The Battle of the Plateau

== Main characters ==
- Gorath the Flame
- Orkwil Prink
- Captain Vizka Longtooth
- Maudie (the Hon.) Mugsberry Thropple ("Mad Maudie")
- The Tabura
- Lord Asheye
- Salixa
- Log-a-Log Osbil
- Log-a-Log Luglug
- Gruntan Kurdly
- Rangval the Rogue
- Abbot Daucus
- Barbowla Boulderdog
- Kachooch Boulderdog
- Laggle
- Benjo Tipps
- Magger
- Rorc
- Dimp
- Sideswiper Smythe
- Sister Atrata, the only abbey sister in the entire book
- Yik
- Firty
- Glurma
- The unnamed grumpy watervole

Preceded by High Rhulain	Redwall series (publication order)	Succeeded by Doomwyte
