= Bruce Dow =

American actor

- Born: April 1, 1963 (age 63); Seattle, Washington, U.S.
- Occupation: Actor
- Years active: 1989–present

Bruce Dow (born April 1, 1963) is an American actor, best known for his five featured roles on Broadway, his 12 seasons in leading roles at the Stratford Festival, his Dora Mavor Moore Awards-winning performances at Buddies in Bad Times, the world's largest and longest running LGBTQ theatre, his voicing the character of Max for Total Drama Pahkitew Island and his appearances on the Rick Mercer Report and Murdoch Mysteries. He also appeared on Corn & Peg as Captain Thunderhoof's arch enemy, the Bad Bronco. He also voices Sir Topham Hatt and Harold the Helicopter (US) in Thomas & Friends: All Engines Go.

== Career ==
Dow made his Broadway debut in Jane Eyre, and has appeared on Broadway in The Music Man, Anything Goes, King Herod in the 2012 Tony-nominated revival of Jesus Christ Superstar which opened in the Avon Theatre in Stratford, Ontario; and then as Paul Burrell in the Diana: A True Musical Story. In the winter of 2011, Jesus Christ Superstar transferred to the La Jolla Playhouse and then to Broadway at the Neil Simon Theatre for an opening in March 2012.

Known for his critically acclaimed, non-traditional interpretations of well-known roles, Dow has appeared as the Emcee in Cabaret, directed by Amanda Dehnert, the Baker in Into the Woods, directed by Peter Hinton-Davis and as Pseudolus in A Funny Thing Happened on the Way to the Forum, directed at Stratford by Des McAnuff and later in Washington, D.C., by Alan Paul.

In 2011, appeared as 'Trinculo' in The Tempest, starring Academy Award winner Christopher Plummer. The production debuted at the Stratford Festival, was later filmed by Melbar Entertainment, and has been shown in cinemas across the United States and Canada.

In 2013, he won his first Dora Mavor Moore Award as best actor in a musical for his portrayal of pop-fashion icon Leigh Bowery in Of a Monstrous Child: A Gaga Musical, for which he also received the Toronto Theatre Critics Association Award for the same category. He won his second Dora Award for Outstanding Performance by a Male in a Principal Role in 2014 for his portrayal of Larry/Harry/Garry/Barry in the world premiere of Tim Luscombe's controversial play, PIG for Buddies in Bad Times.

In 2014, he was also nominated for a Helen Hayes Award as best actor for Pseudolus in A Funny Thing Happened on the Way to the Forum, for the Tony Award-winning Shakespeare Theatre Company in Washington, D.C. He then appeared as Timothy Sweetman in Dr Silver: A Celebration of Life, presented by Outside The March and The Musical Stage Company, in Toronto in 2018.

In 2005, he recorded his debut CD Lucky to Be Me. In 2008, he released a second CD, Keepin' Out Of Mischief.

He is also a professional stage director, a produced composer and lyricist, and an experienced theatre educator, specializing in Shakespeare and musical theatre. He has taught at colleges and universities across Canada and the United States, including The National Theatre School of Canada, the Stratford Festival Department of Professional Theatre Training, SUNY Plattsburgh, Sheridan College and the Randolph Academy for the Performing Arts.

Dow is series director for the Intimate Experiences Cabaret Series, at Buddies in Bad Times theatre in Toronto.

== Filmography ==
Film / Television
Year	Title	Role	Notes
1999-2001	Redwall	Voice role of Log-A-Log and Black Robed Rat	TV series, 22 episodes
2000	Redwall: The Movie	Voice role of Log-A-Log	TV movie
2010	The Tempest	Trinculo	Filmed stage version
2010	Murdoch Mysteries	Pierre Barnett	TV series, 1 episode: "Blood and Circuses"
2011	Drone	Jerry	Short film
2014	Total Drama Pahkitew Island	Max (voice)	TV series, 10 episodes
2015	The Amazing Gay Pile	Suxxxane Summers	TV series, 1 episode: "Houston"
2015	She Stoops to Conquer	Unnamed role	Short film
2015	Peg+Cat	Uncle Phil	TV Series, 1 episode: "The Wonderland Problem/The Bat Mitzvah Problem"
2015	The Strain	Dale	TV series, 1 episode: "Quick and Painless"
2017-2019	Hotel Transylvania: The Series	Additional Voices	TV series, 2 episodes: "Frankenstunt/What About Blob" and "A Year Without Creepmas"
2019	Anne with an E	Examiner	TV series, 1 episode: "Great and Sudden Change"
2019	Corn & Peg	Voice role of Bad Bronco	TV series, 1 episode: "Comic Catastrophe"
2021	Diana	Paul Burrell and part of Ensemble	Filmed stage version of the musical
2021–2025	Thomas & Friends: All Engines Go	Voice of Sir Topham Hatt (US/UK; 2021–2022) and Harold (US)	TV series
2021	Thomas & Friends: Race for the Sodor Cup	Voice of Sir Topham Hatt (US/UK; original dub)	TV film
2022	Thomas & Friends: The Mystery of Lookout Mountain	Voice of Sir Topham Hatt (US)	TV film
2024	Thomas & Friends: The Christmas Letters Express	Voice of Harold and Sir Topham Hatt (US)	TV film
2025	Thomas & Friends: Sodor Sings Together	Voice of Sir Topham Hatt (US)	TV film

== Personal life ==
Dow is gay and genderqueer. He often speaks on issues of sexuality, youth and mental health.
