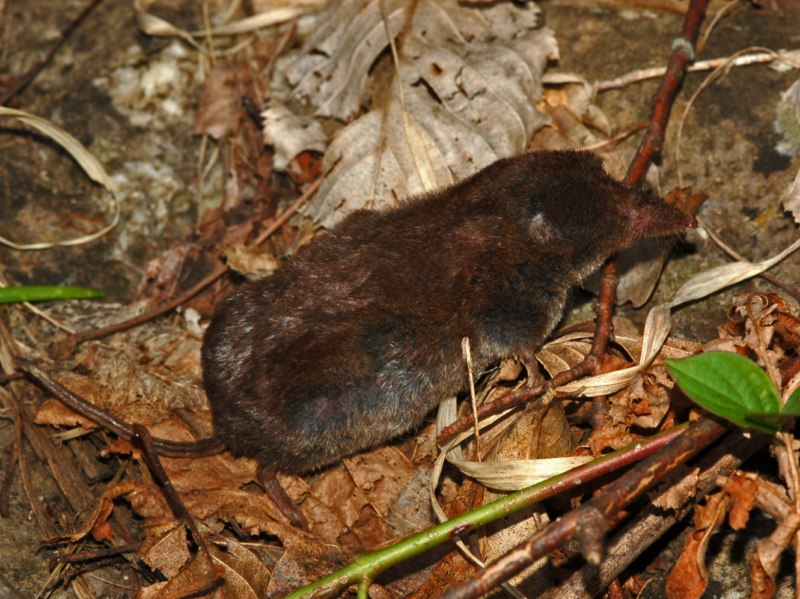
- Sorex antinorii

Conservation status
- Least Concern (IUCN 3.1)

Scientific classification
- Kingdom: Animalia
- Phylum: Chordata
- Class: Mammalia
- Order: Eulipotyphla
- Family: Soricidae
- Genus: Sorex
- Species: S. antinorii

Binomial name
- Sorex antinorii Bonaparte, 1840
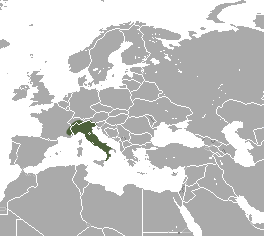
- Valais shrew range

Synonyms
- Sorex crassicaudatus Fatio, 1905; Sorex silanus Lehmann, 1961; Sorex valaicus Zagorodnyuk and Khazan, 1996

= Valais shrew =

Species of mammal

The Valais shrew (Sorex antinorii) is a species of mammal in the family Soricidae.

== Taxonomy ==
Its karyotype has 2n = 24/25 and FN = 40. Until 2002, it was viewed as a chromosomal race of the wide-ranging and karyotypically polymorphic species S. araneus.

== Distribution ==
It is found in all of Italy except southern Apulia, in southeastern France, and in southern Switzerland. This species prefers areas with dense vegetation, at an elevation of 0–1,300 metres (0–4,265 ft) above sea level.
