= High Rhulain =

2005 novel by Brian Jacques

- UK first edition cover
- Author: Brian Jacques
- Illustrator: David Elliot
- Cover artist: David Wyatt
- Language: English
- Series: Redwall
- Release number: 18
- Genre: Fantasy novel
- Publisher: Puffin (UK) & Philomel (US)
- Publication date: 2005
- Publication place: United Kingdom
- Media type: Print (Hardback & Paperback)
- Pages: 352 (UK Hardback) & 341 (US Hardback)
- ISBN: 0-14-138160-4 (UK Hardback) & ISBN 0-399-24208-2 (US Hardback)
- OCLC: 60793890
- Preceded by: Rakkety Tam
- Followed by: Eulalia!

High Rhulain is a children's fantasy novel by Brian Jacques, published in 2005. It is the 18th book in the Redwall series.

== Plot summary ==
The novel begins with Riggu Felis, European wildcat warlord of Green Isle, and his two sons, Jeefra and Pitru, attempting to kill an osprey, later known to be Pandion Piketalon. Riggu scorns his sons' attempts to kill the osprey and jumps into the fray himself, attempting to scare it into submission. The osprey is not intimidated and sinks his talons into the cat's face, flying into the air with him. The wildcat drops to the ground with half of his face torn off. Because of this incident, the wildcat orders all birds on Green Isle to be slain.

Tiria Wildlough is daughter of Banjon Wildlough, the Skipper of Otters at Redwall Abbey. One afternoon, she and a few friends go out into Mossflower Woods to gather some wood, and along the way they run into some trouble in the form of a small but ferocious vermin band terrorizing Pandion. Tiria and her friends manage to fight them off, but the vermin swear revenge.

US cover of High Rhulain

When Tiria returns to Redwall, she and her father have a discussion, where Tiria learns that otter law allows only male otters to be Skippers. This upsets Tiria greatly, and she is quick to listen when Martin the Warrior and High Queen Rhulain Wildlough appear to her in a dream, telling her the otters of Green Isle need her assistance and leadership. After deciphering and scouring the Abbey for many clues with Old Quelt, Sister Snowdrop, Abbess Lycian, Brinty, Tribsy, and Girry, Tiria learns through another dream that she has to leave on her own, so she heads to Log-a-Log Urfa's encampment along with her father and Brink Greyspoke. Soon after, Brinty is killed when the aforementioned vermin band attacks Redwall, seeking vengeance.

At the same time, a rogue otter named Leatho Shellhound leads the free otter clans in various attacks against the ruling wildcats in an attempt to free their enslaved friends. Many famous otter clans take part, including Galedeep (related to Finnbarr Galedeep of The Bellmaker), Streambattle (related to Rab of The Bellmaker), and Wavedog (related to Kroova of Triss). However, Finnbarr and Kroova were sea otters, and Finnbarr had no known living kin.

Log-a-Log Urfa takes Tiria to Cuthbert Blanedale Frunk, an eccentric Long Patrol hare in the service of Lord Mandoral Highpeak at Salamandastron, where she receives a sling from the Badger Lord made of shark skin and the breastplate of the High Rhulain. Along with a number of hares of the Long Patrol, Tiria sails to Green Isle in Frunk's ship, the Purloined Petunia, and they meet up with Shellhound and his otter clans.

At the abbey, the Redwallers continue to solve riddles from Sister Geminya, finding Corriam Wildlough's lance and the High Rhulain's coronet. Brantalis Skyfurrow, a visiting goose, flies the crown to Tiria at Green Isle.

When Tiria reaches Green Isle, she finds the otter clans in a stand-off with Riggu. Leatho Shellhound is trapped in a burning tower, set afire by Riggu's mate, Lady Kaltag, who lost her mind after the loss of her son, Jeefra. The birds Pandion and Brantalis save Leatho, but Riggu shortly after slays Pandion, who had previously ripped off part of his face, forcing him to wear a mask. Tiria, seeing Pandion killed, hurls the barbed star that first injured Pandion at Riggu, and with amazing accuracy, she strikes and kills Riggu Felis.

Meanwhile, Riggu's other son Pitru had taken some forces and led them out of the burning fortress. Pitru establishes himself as the new warlord among the wildcats. Knowing the otters will now return to where their families are hiding, Pitru builds a barricade square in the route that the otter clans have to take in order to rejoin their families. With the help of newly freed Leatho Shellhound, Lorgo Galedeep, Kolun Galedeep, and Banya Streamdog, Tiria routes the remaining vermin forces. Sadly, however, Cuthbert dies bringing down a Nessie-type monster Slothunog, and Pitru with him. Recovering from this loss, Tiria is later proclaimed by all as the new High Rhulain of Green Isle.

== Characters in High Rhulain ==
- Tiria Wildlough
- Banjon Wildlough
- Old Quelt
- Sister Snowdrop
- Abbess Lycian
- Brinty
- Tribsy
- Girry
- Log-a-Log Urfa
- Brink Greyspoke
- Weilmark Scaut
- Riggu Felis
  - His sons: Jeefra and Pitru
  - His wife: Lady Kaltag
- Atunra, the first and only female pine marten of the series
- Pandion Piketalon
- Brantalis Skyfurrow
- Scorecat Yund
- Otter Warriors:
  - Leatho Shellhound
  - Lorgo Galedeep
  - Kolun Galedeep
  - Banya Streamdog
  - Runka Streamdog
  - Whulky Wildlough
  - Chab Wildlough
  - Roggan Streamdiver
- Other Otters on Green Isle
  - Memsy
  - Deedero Galedeep
  - Birl Gully
  - Ould Zillo the Bard
- Cuthbert Blanedale Frunk
- Lord Mandoral Highpeak
- Brother Perant
- Burbee
- Colour Sergeant O'Cragg
- Raphael Granden
- Gawra Hom, a common seal
- Groffgut
- Groodl
- Groop
- Threetooth
- Whulky
- Chab

== Reviews ==
Anita Burkham of Horn Book said that Jacques' "trademark blend of folksy good humor and high-spirited action," and High Rhulain character's exhibits a "joie de vivre that earns them the loyalty of their many fans."

== Book divisions (English) ==
- Book 1: The Forgotten Tome
- Book 2: The Fool of the Sea
- Book 3: Across the Western Sea

== Translations ==
- (French) Rougemuraille
- (Russian) Остров королевы

Preceded by Rakkety Tam	Redwall series (chronological order)	Succeeded by Eulalia!
Preceded by Rakkety Tam	Redwall series (publication order)	Succeeded by Eulalia!
