= Jakestown =

Radio show

Jakestown is a radio show hosted by Brian Jacques on BBC Radio Merseyside. One regular feature of this show concerned "The Mystery Tenor" which allowed Jacques to indulge in his great enjoyment of tenor voices. Brian Jacques retired from radio in October 2006, and Jakestown was cancelled.

The programme's theme tune was a song, the words of which were: "I come from the city where the cats don't sleep, they howl the whole night long, And the sparrows give a cough on the windowsill, in lieu of a mornin' song, And the buskers in the subway sound as good as the fellers off TV, And I'm not bad when I've had a few, you should come and listen to me. Well the tug boats on the River Mersey have a song all of their own, And the Goodison Choir and the Anfield Army sing 'You'll never walk alone', When the sun comes out the Liver Birds stand up and stretch their wings, And there's a song in a thousand hearts, And that's when Liverpool sings. A bustling city, open wide, The North West gate to Merseyside."
