= The Angel's Command =

2003 novel by Brian Jacques

- Author: Brian Jacques
- Illustrator: David Elliot
- Language: English
- Series: Castaways
- Genre: Fantasy novel
- Publisher: Puffin Books
- Publication date: 2003
- Publication place: United States
- Media type: Print (paperback)
- Pages: 340
- Preceded by: Castaways of the Flying Dutchman
- Followed by: Voyage of Slaves

The Angel's Command is a 2003 novel by Brian Jacques, author of the popular children's series Redwall, and the sequel to Castaways of the Flying Dutchman. It follows the adventures of an immortal boy and his dog as they face pirates and other dangers from the high seas to the mountains.

== Plot summary ==
The Castaways of the Flying Dutchman trilogy is based on the legend of the Flying Dutchman. It tells of how a young boy and his dog managed to escape the fate that befell the ship and its crew. Instead, they were given eternal life, the ability to speak in any tongue, and the ability to talk to each other with their thoughts. Ben, the boy, and Ned, the dog, are sent on a mission to help those in need.

In The Angel's Command, they meet up with a French buccaneer and try to help him fulfill his dream of returning home. Ben and Ned are beset by challenges, and the last one causes the death of their dear friend. Afterwards, they meet up with two other young people, Dominic and Karay. They help an old count find his lost nephew, Adamo, who is captive to the Razan, a clan of robbers living in the Pyrenees, led by an old witch. Ned, Ben, Karay, and Dominic manage to rescue Adamo. Nevertheless, the boy and his dog must move on, and their story continues. The novel was followed by a sequel in 2006 titled Voyage of Slaves.

== Translations ==
- Les Naufragés du Hollandais Volant, tome 2 : Le Pirate et la sorcière (French)
