= Rakkety Tam =

2004 novel by Brian Jacques

- UK first edition cover
- Author: Brian Jacques
- Illustrator: David Elliot
- Cover artist: David Wyatt
- Language: English
- Series: Redwall
- Release number: 17
- Genre: Fantasy novel
- Publisher: Viking (UK) & Philomel (US)
- Publication date: 2004
- Publication place: United Kingdom
- Media type: Print (hardback and paperback)
- Pages: 384 (UK Hardback) & 372 (US Hardback)
- ISBN: 0-670-91069-4 (UK Hardback) & ISBN 0-399-23725-9 (US Hardback)
- OCLC: 56659890
- Preceded by: Loamhedge
- Followed by: High Rhulain

Rakkety Tam is a fantasy novel by Brian Jacques, published in 2004. It is the 17th book in the Redwall series.

== Plot summary ==
From a region known only as the Land of Ice and Snow emerges Gulo the Savage, a vicious wolverine in command of a horde of a hundred white vermin (red foxes and ermine) who eat the flesh of their enemies. After murdering his father, Dramz, Gulo assumed control of his father's territory. However, only he who possess the Walking Stone may rule, and after his father's death, Gulo's brother, Askor, steals the stone and sails to Mossflower Woods. Gulo pursues his brother with the vermin under his command. Most notably with his captain the white fox named Shard and his mate the vixen Freeta. Although Shard is the captain of this horde, it is Freeta that holds the real power, intelligence and sway.

Meanwhile, the mercenary Eurasian red squirrel Rakkety Tam MacBurl, along with his companion Wild Doogy Plumm, find themselves at odds with their current rulers, Squirrelking Araltum and Idga Drayqueen, both arrogant, foolish creatures who spend more time on ceremonies in their honor than ruling the kingdom.

US cover of Rakkety Tam

When the forces of the Squirrelking are ambushed by Gulo and 30 squirrels are slaughtered, Tam and Doogy are given the chance to escape the trivialities of the kingdom and track the invaders. Gulo had stolen the king's new Royal Banner, so Tam and Doogy are sent off to find it. The king promises to release them of their bonds after long minutes of persuasion from Idga (they had sworn allegiance to him some seasons before) if they succeed in finding, and returning, the banner. They eventually meet up with the Long Patrol and continue their hunt.

The Long Patrol, however, has its own problems. Eight hares were ambushed and lost a precious drum, which was supposed to be going to Redwall Abbey as a present. It turns out that Gulo has possession of the drum as well as the banner.

At Redwall, the cousin of the Abbot and his travelling companion arrive with a story and a riddle. When two maidens, Sister Armel (the infirmary sister), a squirrel, and the niece to Skipper of Otters, Brookflow (often called Brooky), try to solve the riddle, the spirit of Martin the Warrior appears to Armel, telling her to take his sword and bring it to 'the Borderer who sold and lost his sword', that being Rakkety Tam. Armel and Brooky head out into the woods, but are captured by Gulo's army.

Meanwhile, a volethief named Yoofus Lightpaw is up in a tree when he sees Gulo's army beneath with the king's banner. He steals it from them and flees with it. Tam, Doogy, and the Eurasian goshawk Tergen are sent to find Gulo's army. There, they find Sister Armel and Brooky held captive, and upon rescuing the two maids, Armel gives Tam the Sword of Martin, taken back from Gulo's captain, Shard. The freed captives and the rescuers then return to Redwall.

When the army of hares reaches Redwall, a brief skirmish takes places in which one hare is killed and the Long Patrol Brigadier Crumshaw is wounded by arrows. Rakkety Tam takes command of the force and splits them into two groups: one to constantly harass the flesh-eating enemy, and the other to guard Redwall. Tam and Doogy take the harassment force out to find Gulo's army, encountering the Guosssim, Log-a-Log Togey, and Yoofus. They join forces to fight off Gulo. However, when crossing the pines, they lose Doogy and Yoofus.

Yoofus and Doogy end up in the house of one of Yoofus' neighbours, a dormouse named Muskar Muskar, and his family, who are being held as servants by a small group of thick-headed but violent vermin. Yoofus and Doogy fight off the vermin in there. They want to go back to Yoofus's cave before continuing back to Redwall. When the two arrive, the volewife feeds the hungry travellers sausages and they meet Rockbottom, a tortoise (who is actually the Walking Stone). They head back to Redwall with Rockbottom for safekeeping. At Redwall, the other part of Gulo's army attacks the Abbey after slipping past the Long Patrol, led by Shard's mate, Freeta. It is she that is responsible for entrance of the Abbey for it was her cunning that thought up the plan. The vermin are all killed by armed Redwallers led by Armel and Brooky, but in a fierce battle, Freeta mortally wounds Crumshaw.

Meanwhile, Tam and the rest of his force are buying time for their Guosim allies to clear the Broadstream of a massive fallen tree. Tam's force is ambushed on the banks of a river by Gulo's forces, resulting in the death of Corporal Butty Wopscutt. They swim for their Guosim allies who manage to free the Broadstream and pull the hares on board. Then, they lure Gulo (who is in pursuit on the recently moved tree trunk) so that he tumbles over a waterfall. Thinking Gulo is gone for good Tam's forces head for home. Surprisingly, Gulo doesn't die. The wolverine even manages to capture Doogy, who was escorting Yoofus and his wife back to Redwall. To save his friend, Tam challenges Gulo to single combat. The winner would gain possession of the 'walking stone'. In the end, Tam wins by launching Gulo onto his shield, onto which he had carved a sharp edge, and severing his head.

Tam eventually marries Sister Armel, and they have a daughter, Melanda. Together, they journey back with Doogy, Brooky, and Tergen to the Squirrelking and Queen, who have had a son named Roopert. When Doogy and Tam are freed of their old bonds and the Squirrel monarchs are overthrown, two old friends of Tam's, Hinjo and Pinetooth, ask Tam and Armel to be the new king and queen, but Armel takes the crowns and throws them into the sea. Then they all continue on to Salamandastron, where Tergen stays, and all the others return to Redwall.

== Characters ==
- Dramz
- Gulo the Savage
- Askor
- Rakkety Tam MacBurl (Tam)
- Wild Doogy Plumm (Doogy)
- Squirrelking Araltum and Idga Drayqueen
- Lady Melesme
- Sister Armel
- Brookflow (Brooky)
- Tergen
- Shard and Freeta
- Log-a-Log Togey
- Yoofus Lightpaw
- Long Patrol
  - Brigadier Buckworthy Crumshaw
  - Corporal Butty Wopscutt
  - Sergeant Wonwill
  - Captain Derron Fortindom
  - Lancejack Wilderry
  - Ferdimond De Mayne
  - Kersey
  - Dauncey (Kersey's brother)
  - Cartwill
  - Folderon
  - Flunkworthy
  - Flummerty
- Melanda MacBurl (Tam and Armel's daughter)
- Furtila
- Arflow
- Brugil
- Didjety Lightpaw, Yoofus' wife
- Skipper of otters
- Ferwul
- Mister Death, a European adder
- Wandering Walt
- Zerig
- Hitheryon Jem

== Book divisions (English) ==
- Book 1: The Warrior Who Sold His Sword
- Book 2: The Warrior Who Gained a Sword
- Book 3: The Walking Stone

== Translations ==
- (French) Rougemuraille: La Pierre Qui Marche
- (Russian) "Рэккети Там"

Preceded by Loamhedge	Redwall series (chronological order)	Succeeded by High Rhulain
