= Loamhedge =

2003 novel by Brian Jacques

- UK first edition cover
- Author: Brian Jacques
- Illustrator: David Elliot
- Cover artist: David Wyatt
- Language: English
- Series: Redwall
- Release number: 16
- Genre: Fantasy novel
- Publisher: Viking (UK) & Philomel (US)
- Publication date: 2003
- Publication place: United Kingdom
- Media type: Print (hardback and paperback)
- Pages: 432 (UK Hardback) & 432 (US Hardback)
- ISBN: 0-670-91068-6 (UK Hardback) & ISBN 0-399-23724-0 (US Hardback)
- OCLC: 53390567
- Preceded by: Triss
- Followed by: Rakkety Tam

Loamhedge is a fantasy novel by an English author Brian Jacques, published in 2003. It is the 16th book in the Redwall series.

== Plot summary ==
One day while Abruc the otter and his son Stugg are out foraging for food, they find two badgers; an old one, dead, and a giant one who is barely clinging to life. The otters take the giant back to their colony, where he is revived and reveals himself to be called Lonna Bowstripe. He is told that his attacker was most likely the pirate Raga Bol, whose ship has been lost, and his crew of sea-rats are moving inland. Lonna vows to hunt down and kill the entire crew. Armed with his bow and arrows, he sets out to exact his revenge.

Meanwhile, at Redwall Abbey, there is a young hare maid named Martha Braebuck, who is totally incapable of walking, thus restricting her to a wheelchair. She is wheeled around by her very hyperactive brother Hortwill Braebuck (Horty) and his friends, Springald and Fenna. While napping in front of the tapestry of Martin the Warrior, Martin and Sister Amyl appear to Martha in a dream, and she is told that the secret to making her able to walk can be found within the ancient walls of Loamhedge Abbey and that two individuals are coming that can help her.

US cover of Loamhedge

As it so happens, the two in question are Bragoon and Sarobando, two lifelong friends who ran away from the Abbey as Dibbuns. They survive by tricking small vermin bands and taking their food. This time, it's the gang of the weasel Burrad, whose numbers are at about 13. After Bragoon enters the camp (and Skrodd accidentally kills Burrad) they tell the gang that they must leave Mossflower Woods and never return. Skrodd has other plans, however, and convinces the gang to head to Redwall, where there is a rumour of a magical sword. One night, Skrodd is killed by the rat Dargle, who gets mostly decapitated during Skrodd's death throes. The bodies are discovered by a young fox named Little Redd (Later named Badredd), who convinces the gang he is the one who killed Dargle. They continue on to Redwall, though no one really takes the fox seriously.

Bragoon and Sarobando arrive at the Abbey during the Summer festival and are told Martha's sad story and where the cure can be found. They decide to set out to Loamhedge, but not before Horty's group asks if they can go too. When Abbot Carrul refuses, the trio creates a distraction and escapes the Abbey. Though they wind up being captured by Darrats, they are rescued by Bragoon and Saro, who are not entirely pleased to see them. Since they are already fairly far from the Abbey and could risk recapture, however, they are allowed to join the quest.

Meanwhile, Badredd's group has arrived at Redwall and is holding it under siege by slipping in through the east wall gate. Realizing he could do with some more troops, Badredd sends Flinky and Crinktail out to recruit some new vermin. The two stoats unwittingly run into Raga Bol and his crew, who take over management of besieging the Abbey.

Elsewhere, the group of questers scales the tall cliffs leading to Loamhedge and enters a cave to avoid the rain. There they find Lonna and exchange stories. Lonna encounters Martin the Warrior's spirit during the night, telling him the whereabouts of Raga Bol. Lonna sets out, and the gang from Redwall continue up the cliff face and keep walking to the ancient Abbey.

At Redwall, Raga Bol continues to try to break into the Abbey. After an escapade of using a ladder to scale one of the windows, one sea rat manages to enter the Abbey and is about to kill Carrul when Martha suddenly lunges out of her chair and pushes him away, realising she now has the ability to stand and all she needed was will power.

Badredd's group managed to escape the Abbey during the battle, and Bol sends a rat named Blowfly after them. Instead of finding the escapees, Blowfly encounters Lonna, who asks him where the Abbey is and then kills him. When Lonna arrives at Redwall, he manages to kill many sea rats, and due to the efforts of the now mobile Martha, gets inside of the main building and is able to snipe out the crew from there. In a last-ditch attempt to kill the badger, Raga Bol tricks Lonna into coming out to the open where a group of spear throwers wait to slay him. Things go wrong when Lonna seizes Bol and uses him as a living shield against the spears. Then he goes on a rampage and kills every last rat.

In the meantime, the five travellers find a stream but get ambushed by reptiles. Sarobando sneaks out and gets Log-a-log Briggy to help them get out of the ambush. They soon find themselves in another wasteland and get lost. When Horty finds a dormouse named Toobledum and his pet lizard Bubbub, Toobledum shows them the way to Loamhedge. The expedition to find Loamhedge has finally arrived at the dead Abbey, but all the things in Abbess Sylvaticus' grave have rotted away to nothing or turned into dust. Rather than return empty pawed, Bragoon and Saro tell the young ones to wait outside while they write their own cure, essentially saying that one just needs faith in oneself. On the way back, the group encounters the Abyss and are attacked by Kharanjul the Wearet and his army of painted rats. In an attempt to allow Horty, Fenna, and Springald to get to safety, Sarobando and Bragoon hold off the oncoming forces, eventually pushing the bridge over the edge of the abyss. Though they won the battle, the duo is badly injured, and they die shortly after.

Ten seasons after they return to the Abbey, we find that Springald has become Abbey Recorder, Fenna has become Abbess, Horty has joined the Long Patrol at Salamandastron, adding the nom de guerre 'Longblade' to his name, Lonna has become ruler of Salamandastron, and Martha sings and dances on the walls every season in memory of the two who left to try to find her a cure.

== Book divisions (English) ==
- Book 1: "They're Not as Big as I Thought They'd Be"
- Book 2: "If Only They Were Back Here at Redwall"
- Book 3: "We Lived One Summer Too Long"

(These titles are in quotation marks because they are spoken by various characters during the book.)

== Translations ==
- (French) Rougemuraille : Le Secret de Loumèges
- (Russian) Меч Мартина

| Preceded by Triss | Redwall series (chronological order and publication order) | Succeeded by Rakkety Tam |
