= Apis =

Apis or APIS may refer to:

- Apis (deity), an ancient Egyptian god
- Apis (Greek mythology), several different figures in Greek mythology
- Apis (city), an ancient seaport town on the northern coast of Africa
- Apis (genus), the genus of the honey bee
- Apis, a fictional character from One Piece anime-only Warship Island arc
- Apis (constellation), an obsolete name for Musca
- Dragutin Dimitrijević (1876–1917), known as "Apis", Serbian colonel and coup organiser, leader of the Black Hand group
- Albastar Apis, a Slovenian motor glider
- Wezel Apis 2, a German motor glider
- Advance Passenger Information System, an electronic data interchange system
- Aircraft Positioning and Information System, an airport stand guidance system

== See also ==
- API (disambiguation) for "APIs"
  - Application programming interface
