= Seven Strange and Ghostly Tales =

1991 collection of short stories by Brian Jacques

- First edition cover Cover art by Terry Oakes
- Author: Brian Jacques
- Publisher: Philomel Books
- Publication date: 1991
- ISBN: 0-399-22103-4

Seven Strange and Ghostly Tales, published in 1991, is a collection of short stories for children by the author of the Redwall series, Brian Jacques.

== Plot ==
The collection is made up of seven short stories.

=== The Fate of Thomas P. Kanne ===
Mr. Bausin, caretaker of the Middlechester Museum, is constantly erasing graffiti by a mysterious and persistent graffiti artist, the "Phantom Snake". Schoolboy Thomas P. Kanne, who uses the anagram "Phantom Snake" for his name, is constantly surreptitiously adding his signature to everything he can. In need of a challenge, he decides to target the new Egypt exhibit of the Middlechester Museum, the one part he has not previously defaced. Bausin, who worships the Egyptian gods, locks Thomas in the museum, where he is attacked by a large jackal-headed figure and faints. He awakens to Bausin mummifying him alive and locking him in the sarcophagus of a boy pharaoh; Bausin, as it turns out, is an anagram of "Anubis".

=== Jamie and the Vampires ===
Jamie, a young boy often berated by his overbearing mother, is tricked by his friends into accepting a dare: sit by the grave of a suspected vampire for ten minutes at midnight. He sneaks out and while he waits, he starts preparing to trick his friends in return, applying makeup to make it look like he has been bitten by a vampire. As he waits for them to come after him, a young vampire comes out of the tomb. As the vampire prepares to drink from his neck, the vampire's mother comes out and begins berating him. Jamie flees, and his friends find him hysterically laughing and repeating "Just like my mother!"

=== Allie Alma ===
Alma hates her name and prefers to go by Allie, insisting that everyone at school calls her that instead. While working with the Neighborhood Volunteer Help Junior Branch, however, she goes by Alma. She has a habit of stealing emotionally valuable trinkets from the elderly people that she helps and convincing them that they lost them, and the objects will turn up where they least expect them to. While she is helping an old Austrian neighbour, Mrs. Struben, with her groceries, Alma asks about a little handmade egg. Mrs. Struben tells her about the Christmas during WWII when her uncle gave her the egg, which he had made for her, and about how her cousin Helga wanted the egg for herself. When their family fled from an air raid, Mrs. Struben dropped the egg and Helga attempted to retrieve it, but was trapped inside the building. She was found dead the next day, but not dead from the bombing—she had died of shock. When Allie successfully steals the egg, she hallucinates being trapped in the air-raided building and dies of a heart attack. At her funeral, Mrs. Struben laments that her cousin died the same way, though she cannot remember if her name was Helga or Alma.

=== The Lies of Henry Mawdsley ===
Henry Mawdsley is a young boy infamous for his lies and tall tales. As he is making up a lie on his way to school to explain his tardiness, he meets a strange old man named Nick Lucifer who offers to make a deal with him: everyone will believe his lies for a week, and afterwards Lucifer will take possession of his soul forever. After he signs the contract, hidden from the strange man by a cloud of smoke at his own insistence, Henry's lies grow increasingly more elaborate and he quickly becomes frustrated with how easy it is to get away with anything he wants. When the end of the week comes, Lucifer reveals himself as the devil and starts to claim Henry's soul. The angel Gabriel intervenes and Lucifer realizes that Henry neither signed his real name nor signed in blood; Henry then claims to be illiterate and Gabriel tells Lucifer that a boy who cannot read or write cannot sign a contract, as he does not know its terms. An angry Lucifer vanishes and Henry thanks Gabriel by signing his name perfectly, leaving Gabriel astonished as to how he was able to fool both an angel and his own teacher.

=== Bridgey ===
Bridgey lives with her alcoholic, abusive uncle, doing the chores on his farm and cooking for him. She takes special care of the ducks and the mysterious creature in the pond, the Grimblett. One day, when her uncle is on the market, Bridgey accidentally drops her uncle's honey pot in the pond. She spends the rest of the day terrified that he will beat her, and forgets to put the ducks in the pen. When he discovers the loss in the morning, he storms outside. Bridgey's ducks trip her uncle and he falls into the pond, where he is eaten by the Grimblett.

=== The Sad History of Gilly Bodkin ===
In the 1600s, peasant boy Gilly Bodkin is set on tasting a sugar stick. The family that owns the land that his family lives on, the Manfields, drive by in their horse-drawn carriage regularly. One day, Gilly runs beside the cart and asks for a sweetmeat. One of the girls, arguing with her sister, throws a sugar stick out of the carriage and onto the road. When Gilly tries to get it, he is killed by the horse. His ghost haunts the road until it is rarely used. Many years later in the 1990s, the descendants of the Manfield family come to visit their ancestral home. Gilly's ghost asks their daughter for a sugar stick and she kindly gives him one; however, he finds it too sweet for his liking and fades away.

=== R.S.B. Limited ===
When Jonathan starts attending the school that his great-grandfather used to go to, he is quickly set on by a group of three bullies who call themselves "R.S.B. Limited" and tell him that if he purchases their "insurance" they will protect him from any threats—including themselves. Jonathan is unable to pay, and they force him to smudge his face with dirt several times a day. As Jonathan is trying to settle into the school and make friends, he starts seeing a boy that looks very like himself, but no matter how hard he tries, Jonathan cannot meet him face to face. One day when Jonathan is sick, his lookalike leaves a note for the bullies offering to pay the full cost of his and his friend Kate's insurance if they will meet him on the roof of the sports building after school. When the bullies arrive, a storm brews and Jonathan's lookalike transforms into his great-grandfather; the lead bully tries to take money from him, but the building they are in collapses, sending the three terrified bullies to the hospital. A confused Jonathan returns to school and waves goodbye to his lookalike.

== Publication history ==
- First published in the UK by Hutchinson in 1991
- First published in the US by Philomel in 1991
- Audiobook narrated by Brian Jacques released 2010

== Reception ==
Seven Strange received a starred review from Booklist. Publishers Weekly said of the book that "Jacques's collection of original ghost stories features 'the requisite apparitions, vampires and satanic incarnations, all spun with a distinctly English flair'."
