= Brian Jacques =

English author (1939–2011)

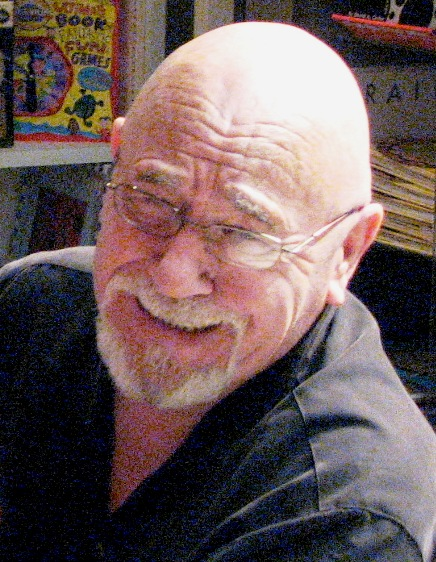
- Jacques in November 2007
- Born: James Brian Jacques; 15 June 1939; Liverpool, England
- Died: 5 February 2011 (aged 71); Liverpool, England
- Resting place: Anfield Cemetery, Liverpool
- Education: St John's School
- Occupation: Author
- Known for: Redwall novel series
- Spouse: Maureen Jacques
- Children: 2
- Website: www.redwallabbey.com

James Brian Jacques (/ˈdʒeɪks/, as in "Jakes"; 15 June 1939 – 5 February 2011) was an English author known for his Redwall series of children's fantasy novels and Castaways of the Flying Dutchman series. He also completed two collections of short stories entitled The Ribbajack & Other Curious Yarns and Seven Strange and Ghostly Tales.

== Early life ==
James Brian Jacques was born in Liverpool on 15 June 1939. Jacques' parents were James Alfred Jacques, a truck driver, and Ellen Ryan, both born in Liverpool. His father's family were from Lancashire, his mother's family all had Irish roots. Jacques' maternal grandfather, Matthew Ryan, was from Wexford, Ireland. Jacques was the middle child: he had an older brother, Tony, and a younger brother, James.

Jacques grew up in Kirkdale near to the Liverpool Docks. He was known by his middle name, Brian, because his father and younger brother were also named James. His father loved literature and read his boys adventure stories by Daniel Defoe, Sir Thomas Mallory, Sir Arthur Conan Doyle, Robert Louis Stevenson, and Edgar Rice Burroughs, but also The Wind in the Willows with its cast of animals. Jacques showed early writing talent.

At age ten, assigned to write an animal story, he wrote about a bird that cleaned a crocodile's teeth. His teacher could not believe that a ten-year-old wrote it, and caned him for refusing to admit copying the story. He attended St John's Roman Catholic school in Kirkdale, where his favourite teacher was Austin Thomas, a former Second World War army captain. Thomas had a major impact on Jacques: "I was fourteen at the time when Mr. Thomas introduced the class to poetry and Greek literature. It was because of him, I saved seven shillings and sixpence to buy The Iliad and The Odyssey at this dusty used book shop."

== Career ==
Jacques left school at age fifteen, as was usual at the time, and set out to find adventure as a merchant sailor. When he returned to Liverpool, he began a varied career, spending time as a railway fireman, longshoreman, long-distance truck driver, bus driver, postmaster, and a stand-up entertainer. However, he often visited the local public library to continue his love of reading, and continued to develop his writing abilities. He published a succession of humorous poems and short stories through the 1970s, and in 1981 won a long term Residency at the Everyman Theatre, Liverpool, where his plays Brown Bitter, Wet Nellies and Scouse were performed.

In the 1980s, Jacques worked as a milkman, on a round which included the Royal Wavertree School for the Blind. He got to know the children there, and volunteered to read to them. However, he became dissatisfied with the state of children's literature, with too much adolescent angst, and began to write stories for them. So that the visually impaired children would be able to picture the scenes he was writing for them, he developed a highly descriptive style, emphasizing sound, smell, taste, gravity, balance, temperature, touch, and kinesthetics. From these short stories and reading sessions emerged Redwall, an 800-page handwritten manuscript.

=== Redwall ===
During his time at the Everyman Theatre, Jacques had met and become friends with Alan Durband, an English teacher at C.F. Mott College of Education, a writer, and co-founder of the Everyman. Wanting Durband's opinion of Redwall, Jacques gave him the completed manuscript. Impressed, Durband then showed it to his own publisher without telling Jacques. Durband reportedly told his publishers: "This is the finest children's tale I've ever read, and you'd be foolish not to publish it"; Jacques was summoned to London to meet with the publishers, who gave him a contract to write the next five books in the series.

Redwall was unusual for its length. Although it is now common for children's books to have 350 pages, and the Harry Potter books far exceed that, at the time it was commonly regarded that 200 pages were the maximum that would hold a child's attention. It set the tone for the series as a whole, centering on the triumph of good over evil, with peaceful mice, badgers, voles, hares, moles and squirrels defeating rats, weasels, ferrets, snakes and stoats. Jacques did not shy away from the reality of battle, and many of the "good" creatures die.

Redwall alludes to the surrounding human civilization - for example, with a scene featuring a horse-drawn cart. The subsequent books ignore humans completely, portraying an Iron Age society from the misty past building castles, bridges and ships to the scale of forest creatures, writing their own literature and drawing their own maps. Jacques was highly involved in the audio books of his work, even personally enlisting his sons and others to voice Redwall inhabitants. Jacques said that the characters in his stories are based on people he encountered in his life. He based Gonff, the self-proclaimed "Prince of Mousethieves", on himself when he was a young boy hanging around the docks of Liverpool. Mariel is based on his granddaughter. Constance the Badgermum is based on his maternal grandmother. Other characters are a combination of many of the people he had met in his travels.

Jacques lived through the rationing during and after the Second World War, when he fantasized about the dishes in his aunt's illustrated Victorian cookbook. Groaning boards spread with sumptuous feasts are common scenes in his stories, described in intricate sensory detail. The war also informed his depictions of gruesome battles. Jacques was known to be old-fashioned in his living; he thought an old typewriter to be more reliable than a computer, and he was known to be not fond of video games and other modern technology, though he allowed an animated television series to be produced based on his work, which aired on PBS in the United States. In the series, he introduced himself at the beginning of each episode and answered children's questions at the end, though the UK and Canadian airings omitted the Q&A session. He never felt that he fit the image of a "writer sitting in his garden." Nevertheless, he was deeply touched by his success at reaching children. He was also pleased to be recognized by the people of Liverpool. His novels have sold more than 20 million copies worldwide and have been published in 28 languages.

== Personal life ==
Jacques lived with his wife, Maureen, in Liverpool. They had two sons: Marc is a carpenter and bricklayer, and David a contemporary artist and muralist.

Jacques had musical interests. In the 1960s, he formed a folk music band with two of his brothers; the band is called the Liverpool Fishermen. He hosted a radio show called Jakestown on BBC Radio Merseyside from 1986 to 2006, featuring selections from his favourite operas.

=== Death ===
In 2011, Jacques was admitted to the Royal Liverpool Hospital to undergo emergency surgery for an aortic aneurysm. He died from a heart attack at 71 years old on 5 February 2011.

== Recognition ==
In June 2005, he was awarded an Honorary Doctorate of Letters by the University of Liverpool. A prize was created at Bristol Grammar School, known as the 'Brian Jacques Award for Most Improved Creative Writing', and is awarded to a student in Year 8 as book tokens.

== Books ==
=== Redwall series ===
1. Redwall (1986)
2. Mossflower (1988)
3. Mattimeo (1989)
4. Mariel of Redwall (1991)
5. Salamandastron (1992)
6. Martin the Warrior (1993)
7. The Bellmaker (1994)
8. Outcast of Redwall (1995)
9. The Pearls of Lutra (1996)
10. The Long Patrol (1997)
11. Marlfox (1998)
12. The Legend of Luke (1999)
13. Lord Brocktree (2000)
14. The Taggerung (2001)
15. Triss (2002)
16. Loamhedge (2003)
17. Rakkety Tam (2004)
18. High Rhulain (2005)
19. Eulalia! (2007)
20. Doomwyte (2008)
21. The Sable Quean (2010)
22. The Rogue Crew (2011) (posthumous)

==== Tribes of Redwall series ====
- Tribes of Redwall Badgers (2001)
- Tribes of Redwall Otters (2001)
- Tribes of Redwall Mice (2003)
- Tribes of Redwall Squirrels (Unreleased)
- Tribes of Redwall Hares (Unreleased)

==== Miscellaneous Redwall books ====
- The Great Redwall Feast (1996)
- Redwall Map & Riddler (1997)
- Redwall Friend & Foe (2000)
- A Redwall Winter's Tale (2003)
- The Redwall Cookbook (2005)

=== Castaways of the Flying Dutchman series ===
- Castaways of the Flying Dutchman (2001)
- The Angel's Command (2003)
- Voyage of Slaves (2006)

=== Urso Brunov ===
- The Tale of Urso Brunov: Little Father of All Bears (2003)
- Urso Brunov and the White Emperor (2008)

=== Other works ===
- Seven Strange and Ghostly Tales (1991)
- The Ribbajack & Other Curious Yarns (2004)
- Get Yer Wack (Anvil Press, 1971)
- YENNOWORRAMEANLIKE (Raven Books, 1972)
- According to Jacques - A Mersey Bible (Raven Books, 1975)
- Jakestown, My Liverpool (Raven Books, 1979)
