= Redwall (novel) =

1986 novel by Brian Jacques

- First edition (UK)
- Author: Brian Jacques
- Illustrator: Gary Chalk
- Cover artist: Pete Lyon
- Language: English
- Series: Redwall
- Release number: 1
- Genre: Fantasy
- Publisher: Hutchinson (UK); Philomel (US)
- Publication date: October 23, 1986
- Publication place: United Kingdom
- Media type: Print (hardback and paperback)
- Pages: 311 (UK hardback); 351 (US hardback)
- ISBN: 0-09-165090-9 (UK hardback); 0-399-21424-0 (US hardback)
- OCLC: 13395159
- Followed by: Mossflower

Redwall is a fantasy novel by Brian Jacques. Originally published in 1986, it is the first book of the Redwall series. The book was illustrated by Gary Chalk, with the British cover illustration by Pete Lyon and the US cover by Troy Howell. It is also one of the three Redwall novels to be made into an animated television series (aired on PBS, but produced by the Canadian studio Nelvana), along with Mattimeo (season 2) and Martin the Warrior (season 3).

== Plot summary ==
A young anthropomorphic mouse named Matthias is a novice monk at Redwall Abbey, where he was adopted as a young orphan, though he dreams of a life of adventure, inspired by the legends of Martin the Warrior, the founder of Redwall. One summer, Redwall Abbey is surrounded by the army of Cluny the Scourge, an infamously evil one-eyed rat. Matthias is guided by visions of Martin the Warrior. While the abbey inhabitants prepare the defense of their home against Cluny's impending attack, Matthias seeks Martin's famous sword, supposedly hidden somewhere within the abbey. He is helped particularly by Methuselah, an ancient and grizzled mouse who serves as Redwall's historian. Cluny, meanwhile, attempts to gain entrance to the abbey in numerous ways- a battering ram, tunnelling, a siege tower and various others.

When Cluny is almost fatally injured following a failed attempt to scale the Abbey walls, a healer fox named Sela is summoned to help him. Sela is a spy, who has sold secrets to both sides in various wars. Cluny, however, suspects Sela is up to something, and when his suspicions are proven, has her murdered by two of his captains. Sela's son, Chickenhound, seeks refuge at Redwall but ends up accidentally killing Methuselah after being caught stealing. Driven from the abbey, Chickenhound is maimed in the wilderness by the venomous adder Asmodeus Poisonteeth, a local terror in Mossflower Wood, the forest that surrounds the abbey.

Clues to the location of Martin's sword and shield have been built into the abbey, allowing Matthias to recover the shield, though he discovers the sword has been stolen by a wild house sparrow tribe, the Sparras, that dwells on Redwall's roof. He learns from the violent sparrows that the sword was stolen from them in turn by Asmodeus. The king of the sparrows attacks Matthias but dies when the two plummet together off the abbey roof. Matthias recovers and ventures to Asmodeus's lair with his new allies Log-a-Log, a shrew, and Warbeak Sparra, the new and just queen of the aforementioned Sparras. Matthias and Log-A-Log succeed in retrieving the sword from Asmodeus's cave. They are originally accompanied by a female shrew named Guosim, who is the final victim of Asmodeus. Matthias kills Asmodeus with the sword. Alerted to the fall of the abbey by the Sparra tribe, Matthias rushes back to Redwall to save his friends.

The Redwall inhabitants use various weapons to repel Cluny's attacks, such as a barrel of hornet's nests, vegetable oil (poured over a battering ram to make it impossible to hold onto), and boiling water (which results in the death of one of Cluny's best soldiers). Constance the Badger, one of the Abbey's main defenders, single-handedly fights and kills Cluny's second-in-command, and later mistakenly murders another captain after seeing him dressed in Cluny's armour. The abbey finally falls when Cluny captures a family of dormice, and forces their leader to infiltrate Redwall and open the gate for him, in exchange for their lives. Matthias, his allies now including the Mossflower shrews and the whole Sparra tribe, along with the newly captive Redwall population, battles against Cluny's minions. Cluny strikes his poison-barb tail at the father abbot, Mortimer, but Matthias quickly avenges the abbot's injury by dropping the abbey's giant bell on top of Cluny, crushing him to death and cracking the bell in the process. Abbot Mortimer is fatally wounded by Cluny's poison-barb tail. On his deathbed, he decrees that Matthias should not become a monk, but instead proclaims him Warrior of Redwall.

The book ends with an epilogue- an entry in the journal of John Churchmouse, a minor character who became chronicler of Redwall after Methuselah's death. It is a year since the death of Abbot Mortimer, and his successor, Mordalfus (formerly Brother Alf), has organised a great feast to celebrate the completion of his first year as Abbot. Matthias has married the fieldmouse Cornflower and she has given birth to their son, Mattimeo, an abbreviated version of the name Matthias Methuselah Mortimer. The cracked Joseph Bell has been reshaped into two new bells called Matthias and Methuselah.

== Characters ==
=== Redwall Inhabitants & Allies ===
Matthias - The protagonist of the novel. He is a novice at Redwall Abbey, and has lived there all his life, having been orphaned at a very young age. At the start of the novel, he is inept and always getting into scrapes. He longs to be a warrior, like the Abbey's famous founder. His wish comes true when the Abbey is threatened.

Brother Methuselah - An ancient, wise mouse who becomes Matthias' mentor.

Abbot Mortimer - The long-time Abbot of Redwall. The first major event in the book is a feast to celebrate his Golden Jubilee. Father figure to Matthias.

Constance - A female badger, old friend of Abbot Mortimer, and Redwall's main defender. Throughout the novel, she kills several of Cluny's chief officers.

Basil Stag Hare - A garrulous hare with a seemingly insatiable appetite. He befriends Matthias, and later plays a major role in the defence of Redwall.

Cornflower - A fieldmouse who falls in love with and marries Matthias.

Jess Squirrel, Winnifred The Otter, Ambrose Spike (a hedgehog) - Other defenders of Redwall

The Foremole - Leader of a band of moles who assist the Redwall inhabitants several times during the novel.

Friar Hugo - The rather pompous head cook at Redwall Abbey. He is taken hostage by Cluny in the final battle.

Brother Alf - A minor character and old friend of Mortimer, who names him as his successor on his deathbed. Brother Alf (later known as Mordalfus) appears in several other Redwall books.

Warbeak - A sparrow who, at first reluctantly, helps Matthias in his quest to find Martin's sword. They eventually become very good friends.

Log-A-Log - Leader of a band of shrews who assist Matthias in his search for Asmodeus, and accompany him back to Redwall. As a reward, Abbot Mortimer decrees on his deathbed that Redwall should be the shrews' new home.

Squire Julian Gingevere & Captain Snow - A vegetarian cat and a barn owl. Before meeting Matthias, the two had been best friends, but fallen out over Captain Snow's gruesome eating habits. Matthias helps reconcile them. They return to Redwall Abbey with him, and slaughter all members of Cluny's horde that survive the main battle. They are invited to the feast at the end of the book, but neither ever appears again.

=== Villains / Allies ===
Cluny The Scourge - The novel's main antagonist. An evil rat who wants to take over Redwall. Much of the book details his many failed attempts to achieve this.

Redtooth - Cluny's second-in-command. Redtooth is murdered by Constance roughly halfway through the book. Cluny never discovers what happened to him. A new second-in-command is never officially appointed.

Cheesethief - An ambitious rat, who is fiercely loyal to Cluny, but also thirsts for power. He covets the position of second-in-command following Redtooth's disappearance. He shows contempt for potential rivals, and even murders a new recruit who shows promise.

Fangburn - A loyal member of Cluny's hoard. For much of the novel, he seems rather inept and stupid, but becomes stronger after the demise of Redtooth.

Darkclaw - A taciturn rat whose role increases after Redtooth's death. Favourite for the post of new second-in-command, though never officially appointed.

Sela - A female fox who is summoned to heal Cluny's wounds when he is grievously injured. She is also a spy. She attempts to betray Cluny's plans to the inhabitants of Redwall, but Cluny outwits her and eventually has her killed.

Chickenhound - Her son. He survives the beating that kills his mother. He tells Abbot Mortimer of Cluny's plans, but when he receives no reward, he absconds from the Abbey with many valuables, killing Methuselah in the process.

King Bull Sparra - The tyrannical ruler of the sparrows who live in the rafters of the Abbey. He captures Matthias and holds him prisoner, but Warbeak and her mother help him escape.

Asmodeus Poisonteeth - A snake who stole Martin's sword from the Sparra king some time before the events of the novel. He makes several appearances early in the novel, killing one of Cluny's captains and devouring Redtooth's corpse. Matthias learns of Asmodeus' possession of the sword whilst imprisoned at the court of King Bull Sparra, and later embarks on a quest to recover it.

== Awards and nominations ==
Winner:

- Lancashire Libraries Children's Book of the Year Award
- Western Australian Young Readers' Award

Nominated:

- Carnegie Medal

== Publication history ==
Select print publications:

- 1986, UK, Hutchinson Children's Books Ltd., ISBN 0-09-165090-9, October 1986, hardback
- 1987, USA, Philomel Books, ISBN 0-399-21424-0, August 1987, hardback
- 1987, UK, Red Fox, ISBN 0-09-951200-9, September 1987, paperback
- 1990, USA, Avon Books, ISBN 0-380-70827-2, March 1990, paperback
- 1997, USA, G P Putnam's Sons, ISBN 0-399-23160-9, September 1997, hardback
- 1998, USA, Ace, ISBN 0-441-00548-9, June 1998, paperback
- 2002, USA, Thorndike Press, ISBN 0-7862-3858-5, February 2002, hardback
- 2002, UK, Penguin Putnam Books, ISBN 0-14-230237-6, September 2002, paperback

== Graphic novel ==
Redwall: The Graphic Novel
- Redwall: The Graphic Novel cover
- Author: Brian Jacques, Stuart Moore
- Illustrator: Bret Blevins, Richard Starkings
- Language: English
- Series: Redwall
- Genre: Fantasy
- Publisher: Philomel
- Publication date: 4 October 2007
- Publication place: United States
- Media type: Print
- Pages: 143
- ISBN: 0-399-24481-6

Redwall has been adapted into a graphic novel, titled Redwall: The Graphic Novel. It was released on 4 October 2007.

== Musical ==
Redwall was adapted into a musical called Redwall: The Legend of Redwall Abbey.

== Proposed film adaptation ==
In February 2021, Netflix announced an animated feature film adaptation. It will be based on the self-titled first book of the novels with the script to be penned by Patrick McHale. In November 2022, McHale announced that he had finished the script, but due to changes at Netflix Animation, McHale left the project only a month later.

== See also ==
- Batrachomyomachia – an ancient Greek comedic poem about a war between frogs and mice

Preceded by Salamandastron	Redwall series (chronological order)	Succeeded by Mattimeo
Preceded by none	Redwall series (publication order)	Succeeded by Mossflower
