= Sean Rubin =

American illustrator and author of children's books

Sean Rubin is an American illustrator and author of children's books.

Rubin is known for writing and illustrating the children's book Bolivar. He also illustrated some of the Redwall novels and contributed to the Mouse Guard: Legends of the Guard anthology.

Rubin was born in Brooklyn, New York and lives in Charlottesville, Virginia.

== Bolivar ==
Bolivar is about Bolivar the dinosaur and his young neighbour Sybil in New York City.

Rubin began work on Bolivar in 2003, commencing illustration work in 2011. Published by Archaia in 2017, Bolivar was named an NY Public Libraries Best Book of 2017, and was also nominated for an Eisner Award.

In April 2018 it was announced Bolivar was acquired by Fox, 21 Laps Entertainment and Boom! Studios to be adapted into a feature film.

== This Very Tree ==
In 2021 Rubin wrote and illustrated This Very Tree: A Story of 9/11, Resilience, and Regrowth.

Published by Pan Macmillan, the book narrates the life of the Callery Pear nicknamed the "Survivor Tree", discovered at Ground Zero following the September 11 attacks in New York.

== Awards ==
Rubin and author Susan Kusel won the Sydney Taylor Book Award in 2022 for their book The Passover Guest, a retelling of the I.L. Peretz story. It was published by Neal Porter Books in 2021.

In 2025, Rubin won the Cook Prize Silver Medal for his non-fiction picture book, The Iguanodon's Horn. Presented by the Bank Street College of Education, this award honors the best science, technology, engineering, and math (STEM) picture books for children aged 8 to 10.
