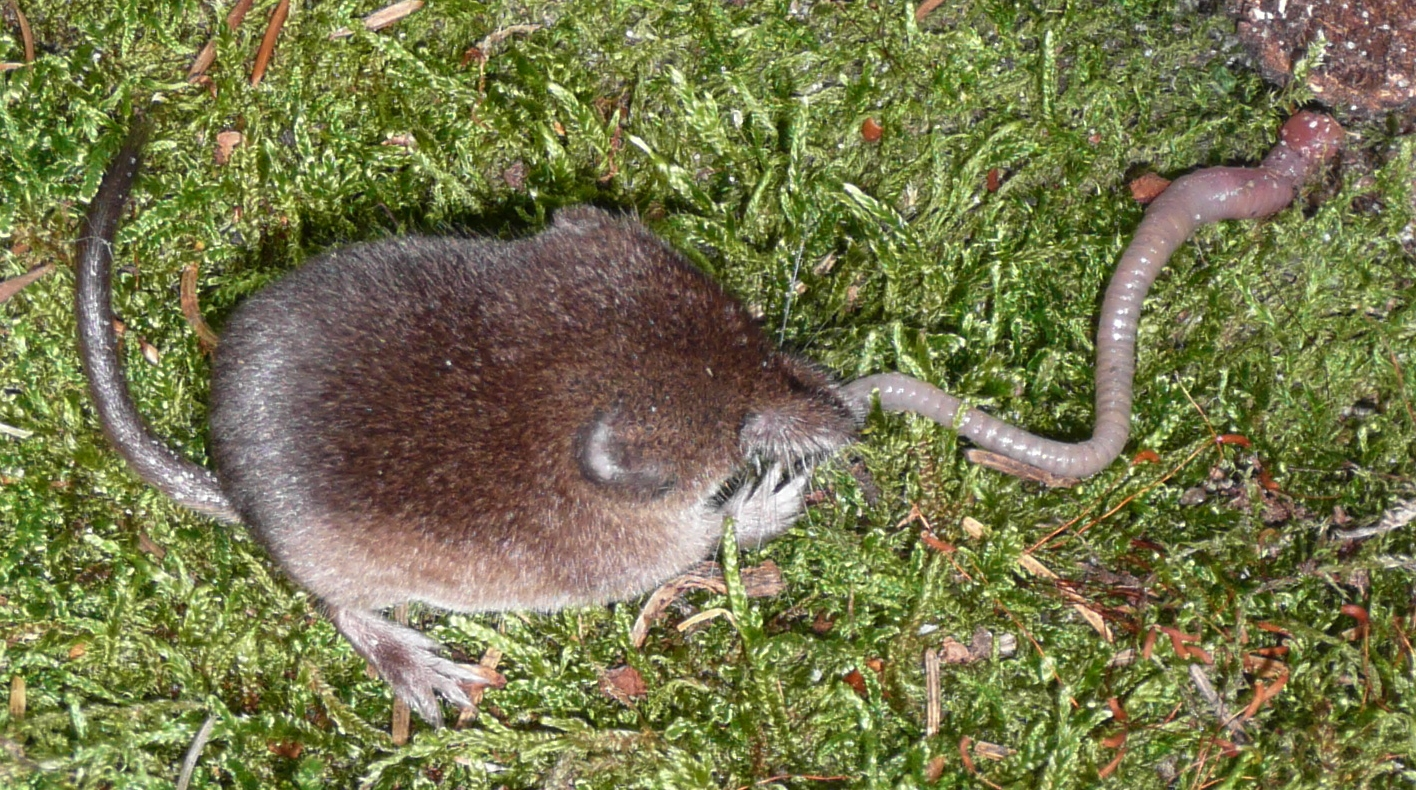

Conservation status
- Least Concern (IUCN 3.1)

Scientific classification
- Kingdom: Animalia
- Phylum: Chordata
- Class: Mammalia
- Order: Eulipotyphla
- Family: Soricidae
- Genus: Sorex
- Species: S. araneus

Binomial name
- Sorex araneus Linnaeus, 1758
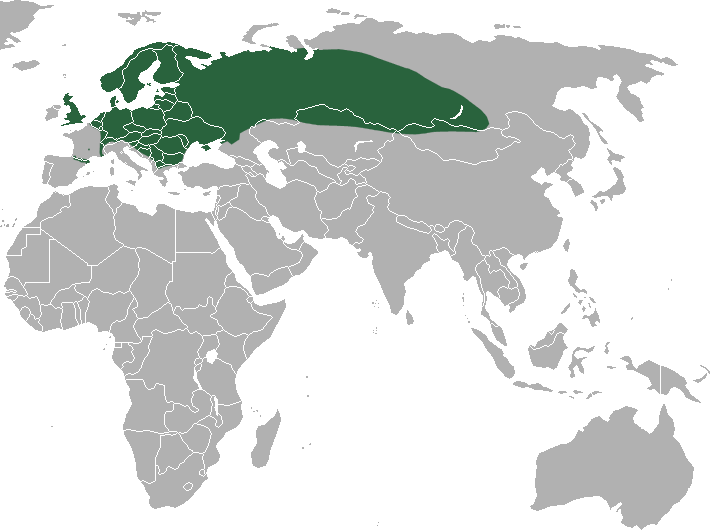
- Common shrew range

Synonyms
- Sorex europaeus

= Common shrew =

Species of mammal

The common shrew (Sorex araneus), also known as the Eurasian shrew, is the most common shrew, and one of the most common mammals, throughout Northern Europe, including Great Britain, but excluding Ireland. It is 55 to 82 millimetres (2.2 to 3.2 in) long and weighs 5 to 12 grams (0.2 to 0.4 oz), and has velvety dark brown fur with a pale underside. It is one of the rare venomous mammals. Juvenile shrews have lighter fur until their first moult. The common shrew has small eyes, a pointed, mobile snout and red-tipped teeth. It has a life span of approximately 14 months.

Shrews are active day and night, taking short periods of rest between relatively long bursts of activity.

== Territory ==
Common shrews are found throughout the woodlands, grasslands, and hedgelands of Britain, Scandinavia, and Eastern Europe. Each shrew establishes a home range of 370 to 630 m^{2} (440 to 750 yd²). Males often extend the boundaries during the breeding season to find females. Shrews are extremely territorial and will aggressively defend their home ranges from other shrews. They make their nests underground or under dense vegetation.

== Diet ==
Common shrew foraging (UK)

The common shrew's carnivorous and insectivorous diet consists of insects, slugs, spiders, worms, amphibians and small rodents. Shrews need to consume 200% to 300% of their body weight in food each day in order to survive; to achieve this they must eat every 2 to 3 hours, and they will starve if they go without food much longer than that. They do not hibernate because their bodies are too small to store sufficient fat reserves and they have a short fasting duration.

Common shrews have evolved adaptations to survive through the winter. Their skulls shrink by nearly 20% and their brains get smaller by as much as 30%. Their other organs also lose mass and their spines get shorter. As a result, total body mass drops by about 18%. When spring returns, they grow until they reach roughly their original size. Scientists believe that low temperatures trigger their bodies to break down bones and tissues and absorb them. As temperatures start to rise with the onset of spring, their bodies start to rebuild the lost bones and tissues. This ability to shrink their bodies significantly reduces their food requirements and increases their chances of survival in the winter. Common shrews exhibit three distinct seasonal phenotypes; however, these phenotypes have the same relative oxygen consumption despite varying temperatures.

Shrews have poor eyesight and instead use their excellent senses of smell and hearing to find food.

== Breeding ==
The common shrew breeding season lasts from April to September, but peaks during the summer months. After a gestation period of 24 to 25 days, a female gives birth to a litter of five to seven babies. A female rears two to four litters each year. The young are weaned and independent within 22 to 25 days.

Young shrews often form a caravan behind their mother, each carrying the tail of its sibling in front with its mouth.

== Chromosomal polymorphism ==
The chromosome number (karyotype) of Sorex araneus varies widely, with a number of distinct "chromosomal races" being present over the species' range. One such race was described in 2002 as a new species, S. antinorii. This is an example of chromosomal polymorphism (chromosomal variability as a result of chromosome fusions or disassociations).

These karyotypes have been known to naturally hybridize, such as in the Petchora race and the Naryan-Mar variant in Northeastern Russia.

== Echolocation ==
A study by Nanjing Normal University in 2019 found that Sorex araneus is capable of echolocation via high-frequency tittering and close-range spatial orientation. Comparison of genes involved in hearing between bats, bottlenose dolphins and Sorex araneus suggests that this is a result of convergent evolution.

== Protection and population ==
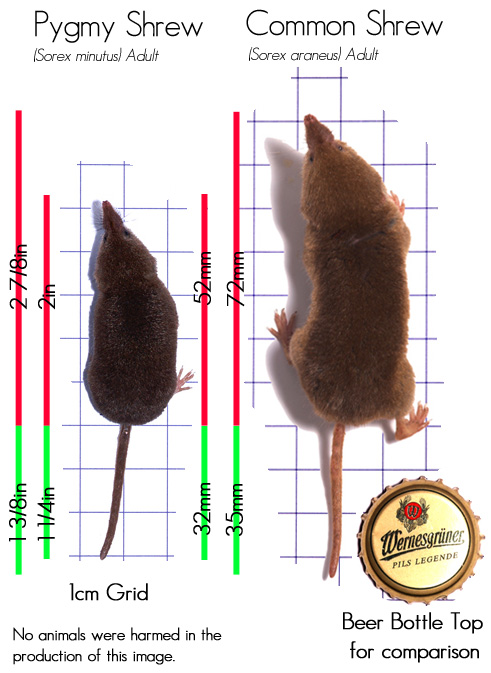
Common & Eurasian pygmy shrews (genus Sorex), size comparison

The common shrew is not an endangered species, but in Great Britain it, like other shrews, is protected from certain methods of killing by the Wildlife and Countryside Act of 1981.

In Britain, shrews can be found at densities of up to one per 200 m^{2} (240 yd²) in woodlands. The main predators of shrews are owls, cats, weasels, snakes, stoats, and red foxes.
