= List of fictional rodents =

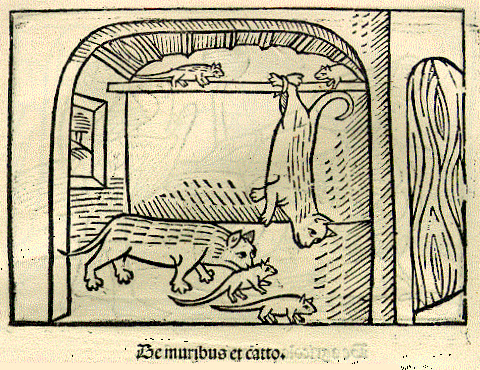
A print showing cats and mice from a 1501 German edition of Aesop's Fables

This list of fictional rodents is subsidiary to the list of fictional animals and covers all rodents, including beavers, mice, chipmunks, Gophers, guinea pigs, hamsters, marmots, prairie dogs, porcupines and squirrels, as well as extinct or prehistoric species. Rodents, particularly rats and mice, feature in literature, myth and legend. The North American Salish people have an epic tale in which the Beaver, rejected by Frog Woman, sings a rain-power song that results in a disastrous flood.

Mickey Mouse, the cheerful, anthropomorphic cartoon character, was a tremendous success for The Walt Disney Company in 1928. Mice feature in some of Beatrix Potter's small books, including The Tale of Two Bad Mice (1904), The Tale of Mrs Tittlemouse (1910), The Tale of Johnny Town-Mouse (1918), and The Tailor of Gloucester (1903), which last was described by J. R. R. Tolkien as perhaps the nearest to his idea of a fairy story, the rest being "beast-fables". Among Aesop's Fables are The Frog and the Mouse and The Lion and the Mouse.

== Literature ==
Character/s	Species	Author	Work	Notes
Ratty	Water Rat	Kenneth Grahame	The Wind in the Willows	
Templeton	Rat	E. B. White	Charlotte's Web	
Reepicheep	Mouse	C. S. Lewis	The Chronicles of Narnia	Reepicheep is a minor character in Prince Caspian, a major character in The Voyage of the Dawn Treader, and appears briefly in The Last Battle.
Tucker Mouse	Mouse	George Selden	Cricket in Times Square	Tucker appears in three additional books by George Selden: Harry Kitten and Tucker Mouse Tucker's Countryside and Harry Cat's Pet Puppy.
Ralph	Mouse	Beverly Cleary	The Mouse and the Motorcycle	Ralph appears in two additional books by Beverly Cleary: Runaway Ralph and Ralph S. Mouse.
Miss Bianca and Bernard	Mouse	Margery Sharp	The Rescuers and its eight follow-ups	
Matthias	Mouse	Brian Jacques	Redwall	Matthias is an anthropomorphic mouse, appearing in the Redwall series. Later called Matthias the Warrior, Matthias is a male mouse of Redwall Abbey
Geronimo Stilton	Mouse	Elisabetta Dami	Geronimo Stilton	
Despereaux	Mouse	Kate DiCamillo	The Tale of Despereaux	
Angelina Ballerina	Mouse	Katharine Holabird	Angelina Ballerina	A young mouse with a passion for dancing. Lives in the fictional town Chipping Cheddar, similar to 1920s London.
Poppy	Mouse	Avi	Poppy	A young deer mouse living in a forest trying to stay safe from the clutches of a nefarious owl.
Algernon	Mouse	Daniel Keyes	Flowers for Algernon	Algernon is a laboratory mouse who has undergone surgery to increase his intelligence.
Basil	Mouse	Eve Titus	Basil of Baker Street	Later adapted to the animated film The Great Mouse Detective
Maisy	Mouse	Lucy Cousins	Maisy (book series)	The main character of the book series by Lucy Cousins, Maisy also featured in the TV series based on the book series. Maisy is a white mouse who lives in an orange house with a red roof.

== Comics ==
Character/s	Species	Comic	Notes
Hammy	Squirrel	Over the Hedge	A hyperactive squirrel, Hammy is the least intelligent, though also the most lovable character in the strip, spouting random comments at random moments. His comments usually state an unusually short lecture on a topic of little interest to the other characters. The character started the strip as "Hammy," but the character was replaced by "Sammy."
Princess Sally Acorn	Chipmunk	Sonic the Hedgehog	The co-leader of the Freedom Fighters alongside Sonic. She was created as a character for the Sonic the Hedgehog cartoon, and then used in the comic as well. As Princess to the King he once overthrew, and now leader of a rebellion, Robotnik views her as a threat. She wishes to overthrow Robotnik and free her father from the void. A romantic relationship is often shown with Sonic, though often feelings towards other characters, such as Geoffrey St. John, and Monkey Kahn, have arisen as well.
Rat	Rat	Pearls Before Swine	Rat is a narcissistic, misanthropic rat and an antihero. He frequently breaks the fourth wall, as well as being aware of his existence as a fictional comic strip character. Because of this, Rat is often critical of the comic strip's style and artwork as well as the other characters in the strip and many other living things. Rat is an insensitive character in the strip, whose interactions with others are typically sarcastic, condescending, self-centered, insulting and sometimes violent.
Ratbert	Rat	Dilbert	Ratbert first appeared in a lab and escaped to Dilbert's home, albeit without Dilbert's welcome. Scott Adams had intended for the character to appear for a single arc, but he returned by popular demand. For a long time, Ratbert struggled to find love and respect at home or in a workplace. His innocence and cuteness won the sympathy of the audience and eventually Adams himself, so Dilbert accepted him as part of the family.

== Folklore and mythology ==
Character/s	Origin	Notes
Pérez the Mouse	Ratoncito Pérez	A figure popular in Spanish and Hispanic American cultures, similar to the tooth fairy. Adapted into an animated film titled The Hairy Tooth Fairy.
Mouse	1001 Arabian Nights (Volume 3, 150); The Mouse and the Ichneumon	
Mouse	1001 Arabian Nights (Volume 3, 151); The Flea and the Mouse	
ROUS	1001 Arabian Nights (Volume 9, 901–902); The Mouse and the Cat	
Mouse	Aesop's Fables; The Lion and the Mouse	
Mouse	Hickory Dickory Dock	
Mouse	The Giant Turnip	Makes a difference in pulling out the firmly rooted vegetable
Rat	This Is the House That Jack Built	This is the Rat that ate the malt, that lay in the house that Jack built
The Mouse King	The Nutcracker and the Mouse King	An evil seven-headed mouse king that seeks to destroy the Nutcracker.
Rat	Chinese zodiac	The first of the zodiac years.
Ratatoskr	Norse mythology	A squirrel who lives on Yggdrasil, the world tree. It ferries messages between the eagle at the top and the dragon Nidhogg down at the roots.

== Film ==
Character/s	Species	Film	Notes
Hubert Flynn	Rat	Rat	A man who is transformed into a rat by unknown nature and his family tries to cope with the change.
Mouse	Mouse	Mouse Hunt	A smart mouse determined to stay in an old house and avoid the house owners who are trying to rid him in order to auction their property.
Remy	Rat	Ratatouille	The main protagonist. Remy is a rat who dreams of becoming a chef. He befriends Linguini, a worker at a famous Parisian restaurant, and assists him in his culinary career.
Mrs. Brisby	Mouse	The Secret of NIMH	Main protagonist. Mother mouse who attempts to save home and children from danger.
Roddy	Rat	Flushed Away	A pampered pet rat who is forced out of his posh London home.
Sebastian	Rat	The Suicide Squad	The pet rat of Ratcatcher 2 which is always with her.
G-Force	Guinea pig	G-Force	A team of specially trained guinea pig agents who work for the FBI. They consist of Darwin, Blaster, and Juarez.
Bucky	Hamster	G-Force	A hamster who resides in a pet shop and has disdain towards G-Force. Voiced by Steve Buscemi.
Socrates	Rat	Willard	A rat who makes fast friends with Willard Stiles in both 1971's Willard and the 2003 remake of the same name.
Ben	Rat	Ben	A rat befriended by a lonely young boy. Ben leads a colony trained by the character Willard Stiles in the prior film Willard.
Hammy	Squirrel	Over the Hedge	An overactive squirrel obsessed with cookies.
Stuart Little	Mouse	Stuart Little	A mouse adopted by a human family. Voiced by Michael J. Fox.
Surly	Squirrel	The Nut Job and The Nut Job 2: Nutty by Nature	A selfish purple squirrel who is an outcast who finds a nut shop. Voiced by Will Arnett.
Jaq and Gus Gus	Mouse	Cinderella	Talking mice, both voiced by Jimmy Macdonald.
Fievel Mousekewitz	Mouse	An American Tail	A sweet and innocent baby mouse, newly immigrated to America from Russia. Voiced by Phillip Glasser and Thomas Dekker.
Abigail	Mouse	Once Upon a Forest	A headstrong wood mouse and the leader of the Furlings. Voiced by Ellen Blain.

== Music ==
Character/s	Species	Song	Artist	Notes
Gerald the Mouse	Mouse	"Bike"	Pink Floyd/Syd Barrett	A homeless aging mouse.
The mouse who ran up the clock	Mouse	"Hickory Dickory Dock"	Traditional	A mouse who ran up the clock until it struck one, after which it ran down again.
La souris verte	Mouse	"Une Souris Verte"	Traditional	A green mouse.
The Three Blind Mice	Mouse	"Three Blind Mice"	Traditional	Three blind mice who run after the farmer's wife, only for her to cut off their tails with a carving knife.
Ben	Rat	"Ben"	Don Black	The theme song of the film Ben. Performed by Lee Montgomery and Michael Jackson over the end credits. It won a Golden Globe for Best Original Song in 1972.
Various Rats, Ben	Rat	"Rats"	Pearl Jam	A track on the album Vs. mentions the character from its titular film Ben. Edder stated that "Rats" is about the idea that "rats are probably a hell of a lot more admirable" than humans.
Harvey the Wonder Hamster	Hamster	"Harvey the Wonder Hamster"	"Weird Al" Yankovic	A hamster who neither bites nor squeals, known for running on a hamster wheel.
Hampton the Hampster	Hampster	"Hampsterdance"		

== Television ==
Character/s	Species	Television show	Notes
Chuck Gopher	Gopher	Gophers!	The head of the Gopher family. Played by Lou Hirsch.
Farfour	Mouse	Tomorrow's Pioneers	A Mickey Mouse lookalike and the host of the Arabic children’s television program.
Fran	Red squirrel	Higglytown Heroes	A female red squirrel and Kip’s pet.
Gordon T. Gopher	Gopher	Gordon the Gopher	First appeared on presenting television shows in 1985–1987 with Phillip Schofield on the interstitial or in-vision continuity programme The Broom Cupboard. His main puppeteer was Paul Smith.
Hammy	Hamster	Tales of the Riverbank	Curious and kind and lives in an old boot on the Riverbank.
Linny	Guinea pig	Wonder Pets!	A female Guinea pig, leader of the Wonder Pets.
Nobert, Zazi and Leon	Mouse	The Magic Library/Bookmice	Three mice, live secretly behind the walls of the neighbourhood library.
Ratinho	Rat	Castelo Rá-Tim-Bum	Ratinho is a recurring character of the show known for singing the song "Banho É Bom" (lit. Taking a Bath is Good). Even though the show was live-action, his sections were animated.
Rattus Rattus	Rat	Horrible Histories (2009 TV series)	Rattus is the primary host and official mascot of the TV series. Voiced by John Eccleston.
Rattus P. Rattus	Rat	The Ferals	A puppet character. He is a black rat with Ochre eyes, a mischievous sense of humour, has a love of foul odors and wears a leather jacket. He is the leader of the ferals.
Rizzo the Rat	Rat	The Muppet Show	A recurring character in the show and Gonzo's partner in films.
Roland Rat	Rat	Various	Popular British television puppet character.
Topo Gigio	Mouse	The Magic World of Topo Gigio	Popular Italian television puppet character and regular feature on The Ed Sullivan Show.
Tutter	House mouse	Bear in the Big Blue House	A small blue mouse who is a friend of Bear.
Warehouse Mouse	Mouse	Imagination Movers	
Xaropinho	Rat	Programa do Ratinho	A puppy character controlled by Eduardo Mascarenhas. He is known for his dark humor and sound effects.

== Animation ==
Character	Species	Work	Notes
Alvin and the Chipmunks	Chipmunk	Alvin and the Chipmunks	Main characters in the animated series The Alvin Show, Alvin and the Chipmunks and Alvinnn!!! and the Chipmunks
Banner	Squirrel	Bannertail: The Story of Gray Squirrel	The protagonist of the series; a young squirrel who wears a bell around his neck and was raised by a cat.
Basil of Baker Street	Mouse	The Great Mouse Detective	An eccentric but intelligent detective whose investigation of a local toymaker's kidnapping uncovers an evil plot to take over Great Britain. He is voiced by Barrie Ingham.
Bubble and Squeak	Mouse	Tube Mice	
Charlie, Eddie, Janey, Jenny, Lizzy, and Willy Mouse	Mice	Bagpuss	Mice ornaments that came to life. Voiced by Oliver Postgate
Chip	Beaver	Iggy Arbuckle	Jiggers' nephew.
Chip 'n' Dale	Chipmunk	Private Pluto (animated debut)	Featured in a number of Disney animated productions, later starring in the series Chip'N'Dale Rescue Rangers and Chip 'n' Dale: Park Life.
The Chipettes	Chipmunk	Alvin and the Chipmunks	
Chuck	Chipmunk	Urban Vermin	He wants to join the GLF. Madman is Chuck's idol. He failed in training but he can join the GLF.
Coco	Squirrel	Urban Vermin	A female flying squirrel, the mechanic of the GLF, and another main protagonist. Prior to the series, Coco worked for Ken, but switched to Abe's side to use her genius for good instead.
Cro-Marmot	Marmot	Happy Tree Friends	Cro-Marmot is a prehistoric greenish-yellow marmot frozen in a block of ice who wears leopard skin loincloth and wields a wooden club.
Daggett	Beaver	The Angry Beavers	Voiced by Richard Steven Horvitz. Nicknamed as "Dag" and "Daggy", he is Norbert's younger brother by four minutes. Hyperactive and immature, Daggett has a habit of overemphasized and manic motions and a potent penchant for name-calling.
Danger Mouse	Mouse	Danger Mouse	Protagonist of the eponymous Danger Mouse cartoons, and voiced by David Jason. He is a parody of British spy fiction tropes, and is frequently tasked with saving the world.
Mrs. Elizabeth Brisby, Mr. Ages, Teresa, Martin, Timothy, Cynthia	Mouse	The Secret of NIMH	
El Nombre	Gerbil	El Nombre	A Mexican gerbil who featured in segments of the BBC children's programme Numbertime, and later got his own series.
Flaky	Porcupine	Happy Tree Friends	A red porcupine whose quills are full of white flakes like dandruff, thus her name; she is one of the most popular characters in the series and she has the identifiable personality of being a very cautious and timid character.
Foamy	Squirrel	Neurotically Yours	A foul-mouthed squirrel who lives with his owner Germaine, for whom he often openly expresses his dislike. Although he likes to eat cream cheese bagels, has a strong disdain for most things, including obesity, pop culture, and Metallica (he blames them for the end of Napster)
Forrest	Squirrel	Carl the Collector	
Giggles	Chipmunk	Happy Tree Friends	Giggles is a pink chipmunk who has a white diamond-shaped marking, a white oval on her torso, and wears a big red bow on her head. She has the personality of a young girl, as she enjoys frolicking through flowers, having tea parties with Petunia, ice skating, and having a shy and sweet demeanor.
Gopher	Gopher	Winnie the Pooh and the Honey Tree	Created by Disney and not based on any character in A. A. Milne's books, Gopher is a gray anthropomorphic bucktoothed gopher with a habit of whistling out his sibilant consonants.
Hammy	Squirrel	Over the Hedge	A hyperactive American red squirrel, Hammy is the least intelligent, though also the most lovable character in the strip, spouting random comments at random moments. Voiced by Steve Carell.
Squit	Squirrel	Panzai	A mischievous and energetic squirrel who often causes comic trouble for Panzai Bear and his friends. Squit sometimes acts as both friend and enemy depending on the situation. He teams up with Zippy Bee for mischief, looks up to Panzai Bear, and often drags Vicky Skunk and Mr. Worm into his antics.
Hamtaro	Hamster	Hamtaro	A courageous Ham-Ham who is always ready to help out his friends and his owner Laura.
Handy	Beaver	Happy Tree Friends	Handy is an orange beaver with amputated arms, whose stumps are covered with bandages. He wears a tool belt and a yellow worker's helmet.
Hubie and Bertie	Mouse	Looney Tunes' and Merrie Melodies	A pair of mice who annoy cats
Jeff	Squirrel	Forest Friends	An athletic squirrel who often serves as the leader to his group of friends, but can be a show off and tease his friends occasionally.
Jerry Mouse	Mouse	Tom and Jerry	Jerry is a brown mouse from the Tom and Jerry cartoons.
Jiggers	Beaver	Iggy Arbuckle	Iggy's best friend.
JP	Rat	Urban Vermin	He is an informant of The GLF and The Ken's Rat Army. He lives in shadows. He does not choose sides.
Kiff Chatterly	Squirrel	Kiff	
Kira	Rat	Iggy Arbuckle	
Li'l Sneezer	Mouse	Tiny Toon Adventures	A young, gray, diaper-clad mouse who constantly has allergic reactions, resulting in violent sneezing outbursts.
Linny	Guinea pig	Wonder Pets!	Linny is a five-year-old guinea pig and the leader of the Wonder Pets.
Louie Watterson	Mouse	The Amazing World of Gumball	An elderly black mouse who is one of the Watterson family.
Marcell Toing	Rat	Ratatoing	A cooker rat who looks for ingredients for his food in human restaurants.
Max	Guinea pig	Bionic Max	The world's first bionic guinea pig.
Maisy	Mouse	Maisy (TV series)	
Marion	Hamster	Bounty Hamster	Voiced by Alan Marriott. A small blue galactic bounty hunting hamster, who accompanies Cassie in her search for her lost father. Goes berserk when called cute and prone to clumsiness and forgetfulness.
Max	Mouse	Max, the 2000-Year-Old Mouse	A pink mouse, who lives in a museum and narrates the episodes.
Mickey Mouse	Mouse	Mickey Mouse	A cartoon character created in 1928 by Walt Disney and Ub Iwerks at The Walt Disney Studio. Mickey is an anthropomorphic black mouse and typically wears red shorts, large yellow shoes, and white gloves. He is one of the most recognizable cartoon characters in the world and is the mascot of The Walt Disney Company, the world's largest media conglomerate in terms of annual revenue. Mickey debuted in November 1928 in the animated cartoon Steamboat Willie after initially appearing in a test screening earlier that year. Mickey appeared primarily in short films, but also in a few feature-length films. Nine of Mickey's cartoons were nominated for the Academy Award for Best Animated Short Film, one of which, Lend a Paw, won the award in 1942. In 1978, Mickey became the first cartoon character to have a star on the Hollywood Walk of Fame.
Mighty Mouse	Mouse	Mighty Mouse	Mighty Mouse is an American animated anthropomorphic superhero mouse character created by the Terrytoons studio for 20th Century Fox.
Minnie Mouse	Mouse	Mickey Mouse	Mickey Mouse's girlfriend who first appeared in Steamboat Willie alongside him in 1928. In the 1930s, Minnie wore her eye shadow, her flower hat and short flapper girl skirt, and a pair of large high heels. Nowadays she wears her oversized ribbon bow on her hair and her short-skirted dress. At the Disney theme parks, Minnie wears her iconic red and white polka-dotted dress and bow. In 2018, Minnie joined the ranks of other animated celebrities (including Mickey) by receiving her own star on the Hollywood Walk of Fame.
Momonga	Flying squirrel	Chiikawa	A flying squirrel with a bratty personality but a focus on acting cute, which it does for attention.
Montague	Mouse	Johnny Test	Montague is a lab rat, experimented on by Susan and Mary Test. He was also given the ability to talk.
Mortimer Mouse	Mouse	Mickey Mouse	Mickey's rival for Minnie's affections.
Mouse Fitzgerald	Mouse	12 oz. Mouse	The main protagonist who is an alcoholic. Voiced by Matt Maiellaro.
Naomi	Mouse	Forest Friends	Jeff's best friend, fond of fairy tales and kind-hearted.
Nibbles (a.k.a. Tuffy)	Mouse	Tom & Jerry	Portrayed as a baby mouse named Nibbles or a mature boy mouse named Tuffy. Sometimes he is indicated to be Jerry's nephew.
Nigel Ratburn	Rat	Arthur	Arthur's strict but lovable 3rd-grade teacher.
No-Neck	Rat	Urban Vermin	Ken's Colonel at the Rats Army.
Norbert	Beaver	The Angry Beavers	Voiced by Nick Bakay. A.K.A. "Norb"/"Norby", he is Daggett's laid-back older brother. Generally well-spoken and intelligent, Norbert is a highly sarcastic beaver and can do great feats of impeccable engineering with aplomb and without explanation. While he is frequently manipulative of his younger brother and just as often condescending he shows great concern and love for Daggett, constantly soliciting and imposing hugs on the less receptive sibling.
Nutty	Squirrel	Happy Tree Friends	Nutty is a light-green squirrel with a yellow diamond-shaped marking on his head and a large curled-up tail that moves when he's excited. Nutty has an addiction for candy or anything that is sugary. He has a big swirly lollipop, candy cane, small all-day sucker, and a candy apple stuck to his fur, which he even treats as his wardrobe, as evidenced in Chew Said a Mouthful, although this sometimes changes.
Packrat	Rat	The Powerpuff Girls	An anthropomorphic rat who is a villainous thief
Penfold	Hamster	Danger Mouse	Danger Mouse's faithful, if sometimes ineffectual, sidekick.
Pinky and Brain	Mouse	Pinky and the Brain	A pair of laboratory mice who scheme to conquer the world. The Brain is a genius, while Pinky is insane.
Rascal	Rat	Forest Friends	He likes to antagonise the Forest Friends and does the scheming for tricks.
Rastamouse	Mouse	Rastamouse	Crime fighting mouse; lead guitar player for Da Easy Crew.
Ratasha	Rat	Forest Friends	Although she teases the Forest Friends, she has a slightly nicer nature than the rest of her family.
Rhubella	Rat	Tiny Toon Adventures	A ginger-coloured rat. Roderick's girlfriend. Loves to belittle and mock the Tiny Toons.
Rocky	Squirrel	Rocky and Bullwinkle	Rocket J. Squirrel, usually called by the nickname "Rocky", is the name of the flying squirrel protagonist of the 1959-1964 animated television series Rocky and His Friends and The Bullwinkle Show (both shows often referred to collectively as The Rocky and Bullwinkle Show), produced by Jay Ward. Rocky's sidekick is the cartoon moose, Bullwinkle. Both Rocky and Bullwinkle were given the middle initial "J" as a reference to Ward.
Roderick	Rat	Tiny Toon Adventures	A dark grey-coloured rat. Ill-mannered and antagonises the Tiny Toons.
Rodney J. Squirrel	Squirrel	Squirrel Boy	Andy's pet talking squirrel who is the titular protagonist of the series
Rufus	Naked mole-rat	Kim Possible	A naked mole-rat who is Ron Stoppable's pet.
Rupert	Squirrel	The Great Rupert	A dancing squirrel who accidentally helps two economically distressed families overcome their obstacles.
Sandy Cheeks	Squirrel	SpongeBob SquarePants	Sandy is a squirrel and is SpongeBob and Patrick's friend. Sandy is notable for her Texan characteristics and knowledge of Karate and science.
Scaredy	Squirrel	Scaredy Squirrel	A smart, germophobic, and occasionally shy squirrel who works as a stacker at a grocery store called Stash "N" Hoard and is fond of cleaning
Screwy Squirrel	Squirrel	Metro-Goldwyn-Mayer cartoons	Brash and erratic and is considered by some to be annoying with few sympathetic personality characteristics.
Secret Squirrel	Squirrel	The Atom Ant/Secret Squirrel Show	Secret Squirrel is Agent 000 in a parody of the spy genre
Sheldon	Beaver	Carl the Collector	Carl's best friend.
Slappy Squirrel	Squirrel	Animaniacs	A grumpy aging lady squirrel who gets a kick out of blowing up her opponents. She often accompanies her sweet and pleasant nephew Skippy.
Sniffles	Mouse	Merrie Melodies' and Looney Tunes	An innocent and well-meaning mouse, who takes risks wherever he goes.
Speedy Gonzales	Mouse	Looney Tunes	Speedy Gonzales (commonly shortened to just Speedy) is an anthropomorphic mouse in the Warner Bros. Looney Tunes and Merrie Melodies series of cartoons. He is portrayed as "The Fastest Mouse in all Mexico" with his major traits being the ability to run extremely fast and speaking with an exaggerated Mexican accent. He usually wears an oversized yellow sombrero, white shirt and trousers (a common, traditional outfit worn by men and boys of rural Mexican villages), and a red kerchief, similar to that of a reveler in the San Fermin festival.
Splendid	Squirrel	Happy Tree Friends	A pale blue superhero flying squirrel with light blue patagia (gliding wings), a light blue/white oval marking on his torso, and a red mask around his head. He is largely based on Superman; he can fly, shoot laser beams from his eyes, has super strength, super speed, supersonic hearing, can turn back time, and can breathe ice. He is often seen doing housework until he hears the screams of a character that needs to be rescued
Master Splinter	Rat	TMNT	An aged anthropomorphic rat who is the adoptive father and martial arts master of the Ninja Turtles.
Squirrel	Squirrel	Adventure Time	A male squirrel who believes he can fly, although he actually he cannot.
Surly	Squirrel	Surly Squirrel	A selfish purple squirrel, who has a reputation for thievery. Also stars in the film The Nut Job.
Toothy	Beaver	Happy Tree Friends	A purple beaver with very large, gapped teeth (from which his name is derived)and freckles.
Wubbzy	Gerbil	Wow! Wow! Wubbzy!	An anthropomorphic gerbil with a bendable tail who is the titular character of the series.
Zoop	Squirrel	Iggy Arbuckle	

== Video games ==
=== Beavers ===
Name	Game	Notes
Chip	Animal Crossing	A special beaver villager who runs the town fishing tournament at regular intervals.
Joustin' Beaver	Joustin' Beaver	Main character and parody of singer Justin Bieber, which resulted in a back-and-forth legal battle between Bieber and the title's publisher in 2012.
Sharky the Beaver	Sharky the Beaver	Title character from the augmented reality app for the Sphero robotic ball peripheral.
C.J.	Animal Crossing: New Horizons	A special beaver villager who visits the player's town weekly to buy the player's fish and take fish model commission requests. He also runs a fishing tourney like his predecessor seasonally.
Nuts and Bolts	Webkinz World	A pair of construction worker beavers appearing in Webkinz World in the Eager Beaver Adventure Park arcade game

=== Hamsters ===
Name	Game	Notes
Boo	Baldur's Gate	Minsc's animal companion in the Baldur's Gate series of games.
Chip	Virtua Hamster	Player character from cancelled Sega 32X title that travels through a series of tubes via a skateboard and rocket pack.
Jogurt	Shining Force	Small hamster-like creature who wears a large metal helmet. Considered a "joke character" who remains perpetually weak even after joining the player's group.
Minsc	Tiny Brains	A blue hamster and one of the game's four playable characters. Used as a lab experiment by humans, he has the unique ability to create solid platforms in midair.
Newton	Flying Hamster	Player character who flies using a propeller made from a leaf shoot to rescue his girlfriend Sookie from a giant eagle.
Rick the Hamster	Kirby's Dream Land 2	One of Kirby's animal companions. Able to jump up walls and carry Kirby on his back. One of the Dream Friends in Kirby Star Allies.
Wrecking Ball	Overwatch	A.K.A . Hammond. Fights in a ball-shaped mech suit.

=== Mice ===
Name	Game	Notes
Agent Squeak	Spy Mouse	Secret agent mouse who must use to stealth to obtain as much cheese as possible while avoiding enemy cats.
Apollo	Sneakers	Main character. A white mouse who must team up with his fellow rodents Bonnie, Brutus, Watt, and Pete to save Bonnie's brother Tiki from a group of rats.
DarkMaus	DarkMaus	Main character. A warrior mouse who embarks on a quest to vanquish evil in his kingdom.
Daroach	Kirby: Squeak Squad	The greedy and tactical leader of the Squeaks. His gang members include Spinni, a ninja; Storo, the muscle; and Doc, the brains, as well as numerous underlings called Squeakers. Also appears in Kirby Star Allies as a Dream Friend.
Hanpan	Wild Arms	A sapient "Wind mouse" companion to one of the main characters, Jack Van Burace. Helps his companion by providing advice and remotely interacting with objects.
Happy and Rappy	Mappy Kids	The sons of Mappy, titular character of his own game, they are mice who must travel to meet their future wife and eventually build her a house.
Hickory Dock	Ni no Kuni: Wrath of the White Witch	The king of the mice in Ding Dong Dell's sewers. He has a long-running rivalry with the cat monarchy, and functions as the game's second boss.
K.O. the Mouse	Little Samson	One of the four playable characters trusted with artifacts known as the Magic Bells to defeat the Prince of Darkness. Can scale walls and lay bombs that explode after a brief moment.
Mappy	Mappy	The game's main character itself is a mouse. Mappy runs on Namco Super Pac-Man hardware, modified to support horizontal scrolling. The name "Mappy" is likely derived from mappo, a Japanese slang term (slightly insulting) for a policeman.
Maxie the Mouse	Mouse Trap Hotel	Player character who must travel from the basement to the penthouse suite in a hotel to meet his girlfriend.
Mia	Mia's Big Adventure Collection	She is a feisty and clever mouse who carries a skateboard in her backpack. She lives in the attic of an old Victorian house on Carrington Lane, where her family has lived for generations.
Mouse	Little Nemo: The Dream Master	One of the animals Nemo can befriend by giving them candy. Able to walk up walls while Nemo rides its back wielding a mallet.
Mouse Tribe	Tunnel Tail	Group of anthropomorphic mice banded together to fight a dark force called the Lumini. Led by Cezar, they include Ama, a female warrior, Dini, a mage, and Tolomi, an old sage.
Mouser	Super Mario Bros. 2	Also a recurring villain for cartoon segments of The Super Mario Bros. Super Show!.
Ms. Mowz	Paper Mario: The Thousand-Year Door	Small, round white mouse thief with a red mask and high heels. The game's only optional party member.
Nazrin	Undefined Fantastic Object	The stage 1 boss and stage 5 mid boss of the 12th mainline touhou game. She has the ability to find sought-for objects and uses dowsing to do so.
Oozy the Mouse	Claymates	A possible transformation for the main character, Clayton, after he collects a piece of grey clay.
Pad	Tiny Brains	A lab mouse who acts as one of the game's four playable characters. Due to experimentation by humans, he has the ability to teleport and switch places with any object.
Penelope	Sly Cooper series	Anthropomorphic Dutch mouse machinist and pilot who often competes in international flying competitions under the alias "The Black Baron". She assists the Cooper gang as an RC vehicle specialist. She later turns against them and becomes an enemy to them after being recruited by Cyrille Le Paradox.
Pipsy	Diddy Kong Racing	A small yellow mouse who serves as one of the playable racers. Drives a pink kart that specializes in acceleration and handling.
Spike	Commandos 2: Men of Courage	A trained mouse given to commando Paul "Lupin" Toledo by the Burmese Spiritual Leader which can be used to distract enemies so that the commandos can evade or incapacitate them.
The Mouse	Crazy Mouse	Blue mouse gourmand who must gather as much food as possible. Player character in the first Xbox Live Arcade game developed in China.
The Mouse	Mouse Trap	Player character in the 1981 Pac-Man clone by Exidy. Can transform into a dog by eating a bone.
The Mouse	Rodent's Revenge	Player character who must avoid cats while trapping them with moveable blocks.
Tilo	Ghost of a Tale	Small anthropomorphic mouse minstrel who serves as the playable character and must travel through dungeons in a dark medieval setting.
Transformice	Transformice	The playable characters of the multiplayer browser game. Have the ability to become shaman and help other mice obtain hard-to-reach cheese.
Mina	Mina the Hollower	The player character. A white mouse and hollower attempting to rescue a cursed island.

=== Rats ===
Name	Game	Notes
Brick	Pizza Tower	A "stupid rat" who appears as a companion for the secondary character, Gustavo.
Diego	Funky Lab Rat	Player character. A lab rat with the ability to pause and rewind time to help overcome obstacles and escape his experimenters.
Ethan	Ethan: Meteor Hunter	An anthropomorphic rat who gained the ability to freeze time after exposure to a mysterious meteorite.
Freya Crescent	Final Fantasy IX	Member of the Burmecian race of anthropomorphic rats. A Dragon Knight by trade, she is skilled with spears and took up a quest to find her lost love, Sir Fratley.
Jefferson and Washington	Rat Attack!	Main antagonists. A pair of rats who gained enhanced intelligence in a space shuttle experiment and seek to take over the world with an army of their brethren.
Mad Rat	Mad Rat Dead	Undead rat protagonist with the power to turn back time.
Mercurio	Armello	Anthropomorphic brown rat and chosen hero of the Rat Clan.
New Rat City (or NRC)	Rat Chaos	An "Avatar of Rats" that appears after you "unleash rat chaos" on board the spaceship and offers to take you to the Planet of Rat, but also begins a stream of consciousness about bullying, depression, and self-loathing. The character won the XYZZY Award for Best Individual NPC in 2012.
Rat King	Dark Souls II	A non playable character that offers a covenant to the player.
Ratso	JumpStart Math for Second Graders	The antagonist.
Rhei Rat	Brutal: Paws of Fury	Anthropomorphic grey rat who fights using Thai Boxing style.
Roadkill	Comix Zone	Pet of the main character, Sketch Turner, who aids him during the game by stunning enemies, pulling switches, and finding hidden items.
Rocky Rodent	Rocky Rodent	Title character. A crazed punk rat who gains new abilities as he changes his hairstyle.
Ronnie the Super Rat	Pesterminator: The Western Exterminator	Primary antagonist who wishes to create an army of super pests to take over the world.
Skid	JumpStart Advanced 1st Grade	The antagonist.
Skritt (NPC race)	Guild Wars 2	Non player characters of many subcategories, common in subterranean regions, sometimes hostile and sometimes friendly.
Slade	Shining Force II	A member of the Rat-Men tribe who joins the player's party first as a thief, and later an assassin.
Twitch the Plague Rat	League of Legends	One of the game's playable champions. A sewer rat who was mutated to possess human-level intelligence following exposure to magic waste.

=== Squirrels ===
Name	Game	Notes
Chatty	Free Realms	Flying squirrel mascot and spokesman who appeared in the game's television commercials and advertisements.
Conker	Diddy Kong Racing	Protagonist and main character in the Conker series. In the newer games, Conker is a greedy, heavy drinking, red squirrel. Though highly materialistic and never afraid to insult, he always approaches new characters with a positive outlook. His adventures occur because he gets drunk and wanders in the opposite direction to his home. In Conker's Pocket Tales, he has to rescue his girlfriend, Berri, from the Evil Acorn; the same version of Conker appears in Diddy Kong Racing, where he is a playable character and that game marks his first appearance.
Flurl the Squirrel	Donkey Kong Jungle Beat	One of Donkey Kong's animal friends whose body can be used like a parachute to allow him to glide around and reach new areas.
Mr. Nutz	Mr. Nutz	An anthropomorphic red squirrel wearing shoes, gloves and a cap.
Ray the Flying Squirrel	SegaSonic the Hedgehog	A yellow flying squirrel. One of three playable characters in the Sonic the Hedgehog series arcade game.
The Squirrel	Nutjitsu	Main character. A tan squirrel ninja who must use stealth to retrieve stolen acorns from kitsune samurai.
The Squirrel	Urban Space Squirrels	Super-powered playable character who uses "antiparticle bombs" to propel him to higher surfaces, solve puzzles, and avoid obstacles.
Skunny Hardnut	Skunny: Back to the Forest	Red squirrel title character of the Skunny series of platformers and kart racers. Sometimes joined by his girlfriend and fellow squirrel Rosie.
Zero	Zero the Kamikaze Squirrel	Aero's rival from the previous games. A version for the Game Boy Advance was planned in 2003, but went unreleased.
Ratatosk	Heroine's Quest	Ratatosk is a talking squirrel who claims his teeth can cut the mighty branches of Yggdrasil.
Sally Acorn	Sonic The Hedgehog	a red-haired brown chipmunk who appears as a major character in the 1993 Sonic the Hedgehog animated series and later in the Archie Comics series. [86]

=== Other ===
Name	Species	Game	Notes
Berri	Chipmunk	Conker's Bad Fur Day	Conker's girlfriend and love interest
Chad the Chipmunk	Chipmunk	The Park	An evil chipmunk with a big bushy tail like a squirrel's who is the main antagonist of the game
Fang the Hunter	Jerboa	Sonic the Hedgehog: Triple Trouble	A jerboa. His character is a treasure hunter in search of the Chaos Emeralds; however he does not know of their true power and merely wants to sell them for profit. He is a slick, sneaky, and mischievous character who will steal the Emeralds for an easier job. Fang tries hard to outwit others, but is held back by his naivety and often fails.
Globmeister the Gopher	Gopher	Claymates	A possible transformation for the main character, Clayton, after he collects a piece of brown clay.
Jimmy Lightning	Gopher	Peggle	Brown gopher who provides players with a "multiball" power-up.
Peter Pack Rat	Pack rat	Peter Pack Rat	A pack rat who risks his life to hoard items.
Virgil Reality	Vole	Bubsy TV pilot, later integrated into games.	A stereotypical 80s nerd archetype. He created the "Virgil Reality Helmet", which can turn any thought into reality.

== Mascots and others ==
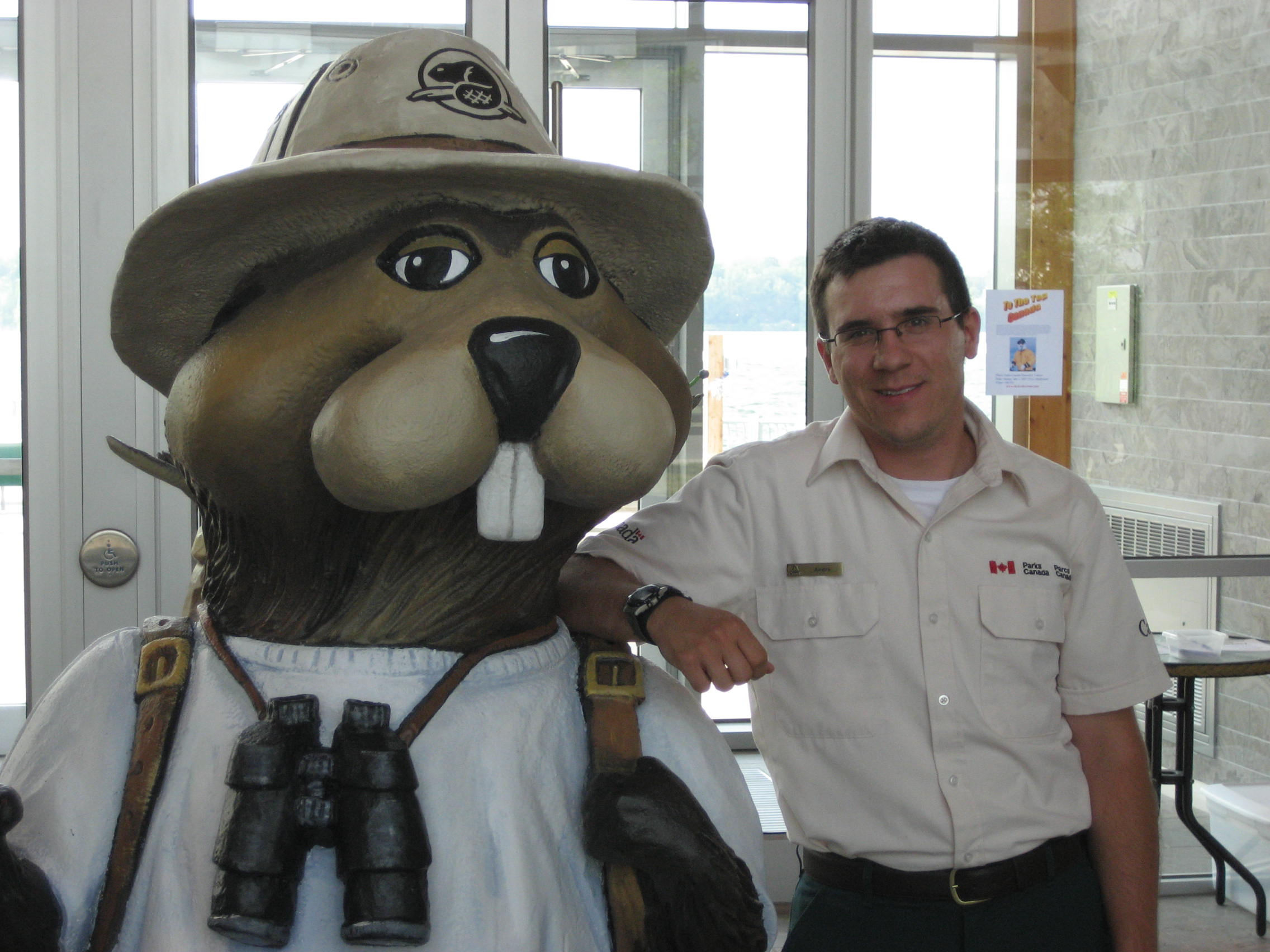
Parka the official beaver mascot of Parks Canada.

Character/s	Species	Use	Notes
Chuck E. Cheese	Rat, later mouse	Chuck E. Cheese pizza restaurant	Formerly Chuck E. Cheese's Pizza Time Theatre and Chuck E. Cheese's Pizza. Originally a rat, but retconned into a mouse in 1993.
Buc-ee's Beaver	Beaver	Buc-ee's convenience store chain	It is featured on the Buc-ee's logo wearing a red baseball cap.
Digger	Gopher	NASCAR on Fox camera icon	Character is shown in the corner of the camera, starting with the 2009 Daytona 500.
Gary the Squirrel	Squirrel	The Best Show with Tom Scharpling	Puppet controlled by the show's host, frequently busts on call screener/associate producer Mike Lisk.
Kia Soul hamsters	Hamsters	Kia Soul commercials	A trio of hamsters who do various gimmicks to represent the KIA Soul car
Mitzi Mozzarella	Mouse	The Rock-afire Explosion from Showbiz Pizza Place	A female mouse who was the only female character in the band.
Parka	Beaver	Parks Canada	The mascot for the Canadian park
The Nutty Squirrels	Squirrels	Shirley, Squirrely and Melvin	A scat singing virtual band, formed in the late 1950s with the song "Uh-Oh".
Scouse	Mouse	Scouse the Mouse	A children's album, released in the UK in 1977, that featured the vocals of Ringo Starr and others.
The Go gopher	Gopher	Go programming language	Mascot for the Go Programming language
Ayunda Risu	Squirrel	Hololive Production's Virtual YouTuber	A squirrel girl who got lost in the human world and became a Virtual YouTuber for hololive Indonesia.
Hakos Baelz	Rat	Hololive Production's virtual YouTuber	A virtual YouTuber with rat-like appearance and chaotic theme, part of hololive English.
Ratinho dos Classificados	Rat	Folha de S.Paulo	He was a recurring character from the advertisement campaigns of the Brazilian journal Folha de S.Paulo. He often said the telephone number for anyone interested in advertising in the classified pages and ended up squashed someway.
Dorime and Ameno	Rat	Internet meme	They are characters from an internet meme. The meme was born on Twitch in 2014. The Hearthstone player Noxious used "Ameno" by Era as a soundtrack during his matches, and the song was soon associated with dramatic occurrences. Years later, images containing the phrase "dorime" and "ameno" went viral on Latin America, with the Dorime Rat, a rat dressed with priest robes, becoming specially popular in December 2019. The meme was adapted to the metroidvania game Tales of Dorime - Ameno's Rescue.
Virgil	Rat	Ride the Cyclone	He is an anthropomorphic rat in the musical Ride the Cyclone. While a background character, he serves an important use as the killer of the amusement park machine The Amazing Karnak.
