= Anatole and the Cat =

1958 Caldecott picture book

- Anatole and the Cat (2010 Edition)
- Author: Eve Titus
- Illustrator: Paul Galdone
- Publisher: Penguin Random House (Dragonfly Books)
- Publication date: 1957; 12 January 2010
- Media type: Children's picture book
- Pages: 32
- Awards: Caldecott Honor
- ISBN: 978-0375855474

Anatole and the Cat is a 1957 picture book written by Eve Titus and illustrated by Paul Galdone. The book tells the story of a mouse who secretly works at a cheese factory and what happens when the owner brings a cat to the factory. The book was a recipient of a 1958 Caldecott Honor for its illustrations.

== Plot ==
Anatole is the happiest, most contented mouse in all of Paris. He is Vice-President in charge of Cheese Tasting at Duvall’s cheese factory. He works in secret at night–the people at Duvall have no idea their mysterious taster is really a mouse! So M’sieu Duvall thinks nothing of bringing his pet cat to the factory...

Clever Anatole must act to protect his job and his life! He must do what no mouse has done before–find a way to bell the cat. Bonne chance, Anatole!
