= The Kid Who Batted 1.000 =

1951 title (publ. Doubleday)

The Kid Who Batted 1.000 is the name of two separate books, both juvenile baseball novels. The key plot device – the advent of a young batsman who is able to achieve a walk (base on balls) at every plate appearance – is identical in both novels.

"1.000" is a perfect baseball batting average – a hit for every at bat – and by convention is pronounced "a thousand" rather than "one point oh", so the title of the books is generally spoken as "The kid who batted a thousand". Achieving a base on balls at every plate appearance actually gives one an on-base percentage of 1.000 rather than a batting average of 1.000 (in fact one's batting average, if expressed numerically, would by convention be .000).

== The Kid Who Batted 1.000 (1951) ==
The Kid Who Batted 1.000 is a 1951 book by Bob Allison and Frank Ernest Hill with illustrations by Paul Galdone.

The conceit is that the Chicks, a (fictional) last place team in the American League, discover Dave King, a teenage hick and aspiring chicken farmer in backcountry Oklahoma who is found to have the ability to hit any ball delivered by any major-league pitcher in the strike zone – but always foul. Eventually he receives four pitches out of the strike zone and draws a walk, every time at bat, thus leading the Chicks to the league championship (an on-base percentage of 1.000 would be the highest in major league history by a very large margin). In his final at bat, in the seventh game of the World Series, he hits a home run to win the game and series (thus achieving a lifetime batting average of 1/1, or 1.000, albeit in postseason play only). After the season, having earned enough money to set up a chicken farm, King does so and retires from baseball.

== The Kid Who Batted 1.000 (2002) ==
The Kid Who Batted 1.000 is a 2002 book by Lee Gruenfeld writing under the pen name of Troon McAllister.

The concept here is the same, except that the teen protagonist, rather than being the unschooled but naturally athletic country bumpkin Dave King, is an unathletic pencilneck bound for MIT, Marvin Kowalski. But Kowalski has one athletic ability, the same as King had in the earlier book, the ability to foul off anything in the strike zone until he eventually draws a walk. Kowalski, like King leads his last-place team (in this book, the (fictional) Des Moines Majestyks) to a major league championship.

== See also ==
- The Kid Who Only Hit Homers
- The On-Base Specialist (non-fiction)
