= Anatole (mouse) =

Title character of a children's book series

Anatole is the title character in a series of children's picture books written by Eve Titus and illustrated by Paul Galdone. "Anatole" is also the name of the series. The ten books were originally published from 1956 to 1979. Two books in the series, Anatole in 1957, and Anatole and the Cat in 1958, were named Caldecott Honor books.

== Plot ==
Anatole the mouse lives in a mouse village outside the city of Paris. One day, while commuting by bicycle to forage for food, he overhears some humans complaining about mice as villains. Deeply aggrieved at the insult to his honor, Anatole resolves to do better. He goes to work in a French cheese factory as a taster and evaluator of the cheese. Working alone and anonymously late at night, he leaves notes to guide the cheesemakers in their work. His taste for good cheese leads to the factory's commercial success and to his murine fame to such an extent that Anatole is regularly hailed as a "mouse magnifique" by rodent contemporaries. The factory's human owners and workers also hold his work in high esteem, although they have no idea that the mysterious Anatole is a mouse, believing him simply an eccentric cheese connoisseur who prefers to work alone.

In these works the author, through the character of Anatole, consistently places emphasis on the dignity of work. Anatole lives in a conventional nuclear family, married to the beautiful and supportive Doucette and with six lovely children.

== Television series ==
The stories have also been used for an animated television series from Canada's Nelvana studios and France's Alphanim. The 26-episode series originally aired on America's CBS network in 1998, and was rerun on the Disney Channel from 2001 until 2004. Previously, in 1966, there was an animated segment based on the books for the cult film Alice of Wonderland in Paris.

== Stage show ==
In 2014, "Anatole" and "Anatole and the Cat" were combined and adapted into a successful musical with book and lyrics co-authored by John Maclay and Lee Becker, and with music by James Valcq. First Stage Children's Theater premiered the show in February 2014, and it was met with great commercial and critical success.

== Anatole series ==
- Anatole (1956)
- Anatole and the Cat (1957)
- Anatole and the Robot (1960)
- Anatole over Paris (1961)
- Anatole and the Poodle (1965)
- Anatole and the Piano (1966)
- Anatole and the Thirty Thieves (1969)
- Anatole and the Toyshop (1970)
- Anatole in Italy (1973)
- Anatole and the Pied Piper (1979)

== See also ==
- List of fictional rodents
