= Paul Galdone =

American illustrator of children's books (1907–86)

- Born: June 2, 1907; Budapest, Austria-Hungary
- Died: November 7, 1986 (aged 79); Nyack, New York, USA
- Occupations: Illustrator, writer
- Writing career
- Notable works: Anatole; The Gingerbread Boy; Three Little Kittens; The Little Red Hen; The Three Billy Goats Gruff; George Washington's Breakfast

Paul Galdone (June 2, 1907 – November 7, 1986) was an illustrator and writer known best for children's picture books.

== Early life ==
He was born in Budapest and he emigrated to the United States in 1921. He studied art at the Art Student's League and New York School for Industrial Design. He served in the US Army during World War II.

== Career and honors ==
Galdone illustrated nearly all of Eve Titus' books, including Basil of Baker Street series which was translated to the screen in the animated Disney film, The Great Mouse Detective. Galdone and Titus were nominated for Caldecott Medals for Anatole (1957) and Anatole and the Cat (1958). The titles were later named Caldecott Honor books in 1971.

His books Anatole (1956); Tom, Tom the Piper's Son (1964); and The Little Red Hen (1973) received starred reviews from Kirkus Reviews.

His retellings of classic tales like The Little Red Hen have become staples.

He was posthumously awarded the 1996 Kerlan Award for his contributions to children's literature.

== Death ==
On November 7, 1986 at age 79, he died of a heart attack in Nyack, New York.

== Selected works ==
Year	Title	Contribution	Text
1946	The Little Green Car	Illustrated	by C. D. Emerson
1950	The Reluctant Landlord	Illustrated	by Scott Corbett
1951	Nine Lives; or, the celebrated cat of Beacon Hill	Illustrated	by Edward Fenton
1951	The kid who batted 1,000	Illustrated	by Bob Allison and Frank Ernest Hill
1951	Of Mikes and Men	Illustrated	by Jane Woodfin
1952	Space Cat	Illustrated	by Ruthven Todd
1956	Anatole (series of ten to 1979)	Illustrated	by Eve Titus featuring a "mouse village" near Paris
1958	Basil of Baker Street (series of five to 1982)	Illustrated	by Eve Titus featuring the "great mouse detective"
1959	Grandfather and I	Illustrated	by Helen E. Buckley
1959	Paddy the Penguin	Illustrated	
1960	The Old Woman and Her Pig	Illustrated	
1960	The Different Dog	Illustrated	by Dale Everson
1961	The House that Jack Built	Adapted and illustrated	
1961	The Three Wishes	Adapted and illustrated	
1962	The First Seven Days	Written and illustrated	
1963	The Blind Men and the Elephant	Illustrated	by John Godfrey Saxe, from the Indian fable Blind men and an elephant
1963	Paul Revere's Ride	Illustrated	from the American poem "Paul Revere's Ride" by Henry Wadsworth Longfellow
1964	Tom, Tom the Piper's Son	Illustrated	
1966	The History of Simple Simon	Illustrated	
1969	Little Tuppen	Illustrated	
1968	Henny Penny	Adapted and illustrated	from the "Henny Penny" fable
1968	The Horse, the Fox and the Lion	Adapted and illustrated	
1968	The Wise Fool	Illustrated	
1969	George Washington's Breakfast	Illustrated	by Jean Fritz
1969	The Monkey and the Crocodile: A Jataka Tale from India	Written and illustrated	from one of the Indian Jataka tales
1969	The Life of Jack Spratt, His Wife & His Cat	Illustrated	
1970	The Three Little Pigs	Adapted and illustrated	from the fable The Three Little Pigs; with Joanna Galdone
1970	Androcles and the Lion	Adapted and illustrated	
1971	Three Aesop Fox Fables	Adapted and illustrated	from Aesop's Fables; with Joanna C. Galdone
1971	The Town Mouse and the Country Mouse	Adapted and illustrated	from "The Town Mouse and the Country Mouse" tale
1972	The Three Bears	Adapted and illustrated	from the "Goldilocks and the Three Bears" tale
1972	The Moving Adventures of Old Dame Trot	Adapted and illustrated	
1972	Honeybee's Party	Illustrated	
1973	The Little Red Hen	Adapted and illustrated	from the "Little Red Hen" folktale
1973	The Three Billy Goats Gruff	Adapted and illustrated	from the Norwegian fairytale Three Billy Goats Gruff
1974	Speak Up, Edie!	Illustrated	by Johanna Johnston
1974	Little Red Riding Hood	Adapted and illustrated	from the fairytale Little Red Riding Hood
1974	Jack and the Beanstalk/The History of Mother Twaddle and the Marvelous Achievements of Her Son Jack	Adapted and illustrated	from the Jack and the Beanstalk tale
1975	The Gingerbread Boy	Adapted and illustrated	from the American fairytale The Gingerbread Boy
1976	Cinderella	Adapted and illustrated	from the Cinderella tale
1976	Puss in Boots	Adapted and illustrated	from the French fairytale Puss in Boots by Charles Perrault
1976	The Magic Porridge Pot	Adapted and illustrated	
1977	The Tailypo: A Ghost Story	Illustrated	by Joanna Galdone from the tale "Tailypo"
1977	A Strange Servant	Illustrated	Translated by Blanche Ross
1978	The Princess and the Pea	Illustrated	by Hans Christian Andersen from "The Princess and the Pea" fairytale
1979	Hans in Luck	Adapted and illustrated	from the "Hans in Luck" fairytale
1980	King of the Cats	Adapted and illustrated	from the "King of the Cats" folktale
1981	The Three Sillies	Adapted and illustrated	
1981	The Amazing Pig	Written and illustrated	
1982	The Monster and the Tailor: A Ghost Story	Adapted and illustrated	
1982	What's in Fox's Sack? An Old English Tale	Adapted and illustrated	
1983	The Greedy Old Fat Man	Written and illustrated	
1983	The Turtle and the Monkey	Illustrated	by Joanna C. Galdone
1984	The Elves and the Shoemaker	Adapted and illustrated	from the tale The Elves and the Shoemaker
1985	Rumpelstiltskin	Adapted and illustrated	from the Rumpelstiltskin fairytale
1986	The Three Little Kittens	Adapted and illustrated	from the English nursery rhyme "Three Little Kittens"
1987	The Complete Story of the Three Blind Mice	Illustrated	by John W. Ivimey from the English nursery rhyme "Three Blind Mice" (posthumous publication)
