= Anatole (TV series) =

- Title card featuring Anatole
- Genre: Children's television series
- Created by: Eve Titus
- Composer: Milan Kymlicka
- Countries of origin: France; Canada
- Original language: English
- No. of episodes: 26

Production
- Production companies: Nelvana Limited; Valentine Productions s.a.r.l.

Original release
- Network: CBS (United States); YTV (Canada); TF1 (TF!) (France)
- Release: 3 October 1998 – 28 June 1999

Anatole is an animated children's television series based on the Anatole book series by Eve Titus. The series was presented by Scottish Television Enterprises and produced by Valentine Productions s.a.r.l. and Nelvana. It originally aired on Canada's YTV network from 1998 to 1999, and premiered in the US on CBS on 3 October 1998, and aired through the 1998–99 television season.

== Premise ==
The series tells the story of Anatole, an anthropomorphic mouse who lives in Paris, Europe. He works as a night watchman in a cheese factory. He has a wife, Doucette, and a family of six little mice.

== Characters ==
=== Main ===
- Anatole, the series' lead. A loyal, honest, brave and open-minded mouse, Anatole is a good father to his children and a wonderful husband to Doucette.
- Gaston, Anatole's friend
- Doucette, Anatole's wife. Kind, loyal, wise and patient, Doucette is a source of comfort and advice to her children and her husband. A good mother, She gets genuinely worried whenever her family are in peril. In "The Hunchbat of Notre Dame", it is revealed that she is afraid of heights.
- Paul, Anatole's oldest son. He loves inventing, sword-fighting and sailing.
- Paulette, Anatole's oldest daughter. She shares similar interests as her brother Paul, including inventing and sword fighting.
- Claude, Anatole's middle son. He loves books and proves to have an active imagination.
- Claudette, Anatole's middle daughter. Literary like her brother Claude, Claudette also loves art.
- Georges, Anatole's youngest son
- Georgette, Anatole's youngest daughter
- Pamplemousse, the mayor of the mouse village

=== Supporting ===
- Edgar - A large but good-natured rat who helps Anatole rescue Claude, Paul and Paulette from the Parisian sewers.
- Molière - Anatole's dependable mole friend, who is an expert miner/tunneler.
- Rene
- Yvette
- Mayor Soucy
- Pascal
- Uncle Louis
- M. Duval
- Charlemagne the Cat - M. Duval's pet cat and one of Anatole's antagonists in the series.
- Pierre the Pigeon - A pigeon who would much rather walk than fly, due to getting dizzy while flying (airsickness).
- Otto
- Gretchen
- Hans
- Nathalie
- Comtesse De Souris
- Maurice
- Jacques - A misunderstood, hunchbacked bat who guards the Notre Dame Cathedral. At first intimidating, he is actually a passionate music lover and Gothic architecture. He shares similarities to Quasimodo from "The Hunchback of Notre Dame" and Erik the Phantom from "Phantom of the Opera."
- The Two Crows
- Nostromo
- The Bakers
- Thief
- Two weasels

== Production ==
CBS announced in January 1998 that it would return to airing cartoons as part of its Saturday morning programming schedule for the 1998–99 television season, and Anatole was among the new animated series announced, as part of a supply deal from Nelvana including Franklin, Dumb Bunnies, Birdz, Mythic Warriors: Guardians of the Legend and From the Files of Flying Rhinoceros (later retitled to Flying Rhino Junior High). On April 1, 1998, Scottish Television Enterprises and Nelvana signed an agreement that added STE as a production partner for the CBS slate. As part of the deal, STE was granted distribution rights to the entire Nelvana-CBS slate within the UK, outside of Franklin.

In July 1998, it was announced that CBS would premiere Anatole and the rest of its Saturday morning animated programming on 19 September 1998, though by September the premiere date had slipped to 3 October 1998.

== Episodes ==
Charles E. Bastien directed every episode of Anatole.

No.	Title	Original release date	Prod. code
1	"Anatole's Parisian Adventure"	3 October 1998	1
Anatole goes with Gaston to the cheese factory solving M. Duval's bitter cheese problem and earning himself the position as Vice President of the company.
2	"Sewer Rats"	10 October 1998	2
Paul, Paulette and Claude drift into the sewers, but are rescued by Antatole's friends and a rat named Edgar.
3	"The Mouse Who Cried Wolf"	17 October 1998	3
After a cry wolf case from Claude, Anatole goes to find Doucette, George and Georgette trapped in a toy store while the others return a man his wallet.
4	"Mouse-A-Lisa"	24 October 1998	4
Thieving bakers do a series of art thefts. With help from Claudette's artistic talent, Anatole exposes the thieves to the police.
5	"The Artful Dodger"	31 October 1998	5
The Shadow Thief Elvon is robbing Paris. As a sneaky geezer he gets Paulette to help him out, but Anatole turns the tables on him at his latest robbery.
6	"The Village is Falling"	7 November 1998	6
Humans are digging holes to fix a water pipe. With Molière and the town's help, Anatole and Gaston manage to find it for the humans before they dig up the mouse village.
7	"The High Fliers"	21 November 1998	7
Anatole, Georgette, George and Gaston fix up a kite and fly on it. Two magpies go after the kite and Doucette's homemade medal, but Anatole sorts it out.
8	"Anatole and the Hunchbat of Notre Dame"	28 November 1998	13
Visiting Gaston's cousin Maurice, Anatole finds that Maurice is being evicted from Notre Dame by a bat named Jacque, but Anatole is able to negotiate with him.
9	"The Cheesy Imposter"	5 December 1998	8
Duval's employee Marcel takes credit for Anatole's cheese recipe, but Anatole is able to get his confession and save his livelihood. Meanwhile Paul and Paulette get some cheese from the factory to Mons. Pamplemousse.
10	"The Phantom of the Cheese"	12 December 1998	9
Anatole has a gift for the opera singer Madame Leblanc, but cheese disappears. Anatole finds a singing mouse named Renee. Anatole depends on her to help him recover the cheese from the security guard.
11	"Wild Life"	19 December 1998	11
A monster apparently lurks in the park. It turns out to be a Canadian Beaver named Natalie. Anatole and Gaston help Natalie to the Canadian Embassy before she is taken back to the petting zoo.
12	"The Night of Lights"	26 December 1998	10
Otto, Gretchen and their boy Hans visit the mouse village in time for the Night of Lights. A fire started by Hans forces the mice to start all over again, but the town forgives him.
13	"Feline Follies"	2 January 1999	12
A cat show in the park is complicating matters for the mouse village. Comtesse De Souris is escorted by bloodhound while Anatole and Gaston execute a move to repel the cats from the village.
14	"Anatole and the String of Pearls"	25 January 1999	14
Monsieur Duval has Anatole guard a priceless pearl necklace meant to be Duval's birthday-present to his wife, but when a thief takes the necklace, Anatole is determined to save it.
15	"The Mousepiece"	TBA	TBA
Anatole is building a miniature car as a birthday-present for Paul and Paulette, but Gaston discovers it. Anatole made him promise to keep it a secret, but Gaston makes things worse by telling Pamplemousse, then both ruin the car. Can they all fix the car and deliver it on time?
16	"Tricky You"	TBA	TBA
On April Fool's day, the kids begin pranking everyone, but the pranks end up turning into serious and even life-threatening situations.
17	"Truffle Treasure"	TBA	TBA
It was Anatole and Doucette's wedding-anniversary, and the former wants to reenact his proposal to the latter, so he and Gaston secretly head to Truffle Valley, but things take a turn for the worse, and the anniversary turns into a rescue-mission.
18	"The Long, Long Night"	TBA	TBA
Doucette and the children go camping, leaving Anatole to enjoy having their house all to himself...until Gaston comes over and begins alarming Anatole of tales of woodland-dwelling monsters. They set off for the former's family (who are doing perfectly fine), only to find themselves the ones in trouble.
19	"Les Mouserables"	TBA	TBA
Anatole recalls how Pamplemousse's uncle Louis dictated the mice by withholding all the food, so Anatole, along with Doucette and Gaston, create their own village where everyone can live happily, and even forgives Pamplemousse. The story teaches the children that you can't hate anyone forever.
20	"Over the Sea"	TBA	TBA
Duval has finally gotten a shipment of cheese heading for the United States, but when Charlemagne ambushes the party, Gaston gets taken with the shipment, and Anatole has to save him before the ship leaves.
21	"The Mystery of the Dancing Ghost"	19 April 1999	22
On Halloween, Claude and Claudette read ghost stories, but then hear strange noises and assume it is a ghost from said stories, but really it is two weasels burglerizing Pamplemousse. The children learn the lesson to not jump to conclusions.
22	"World of Cheese"	3 May 1999	23
Anatole and Doucette take a vacation to Switzerland, but it turns into a recovery-mission when the rat J.P steals Duval's cheese. Can the trio save the cheese and put J.P in his place?
23	"Anatole and the New Cat"	17 May 1999	21
A new family of mice move to Duval's factory, but they are greedy and began taking too much cheese. Worse, Charlemagne is too overwhelmed with the mice' presence, which gets him replaced by a meaner cat named Nostromo. To end this problem, Anatole and Charlemagne must team-up.
24	"Bully for Anatole"	31 May 1999	24
A neighbor mayor mouse and his son arrive in the town, only to begin bullying the populace.
25	"The Perils of Paulette"	14 June 1999	25
Doucette's sister Yvette pays a visit, and her tales of travel seduce Paulette into tagging along with her aunt, but she has stumbled into a woodcarver's shop making dollhouses for Australia, and may get sent along with them.
26	"My Favourite Mouse"	28 June 1999	26
Moliere has connected Anatole's house to the cheese factory he works at, but this makes Gaston jealous of Anatole focusing on Moliere so much. Coincidentally, Claude and Claudette become jealous of their siblings Paul and Paulette getting more of their parents' attention.
