= Mr. Shaw's Shipshape Shoeshop =

1970 book by Eve Titus

Mr. Shaw's Shipshape Shoeshop is a 1970 children's picture book written by Eve Titus and illustrated by Larry Ross. Unlike Titus' other books the story does not feature an anthropomorphic mouse. However, it features heavy use of the "sh" sound.

== Plot summary ==
Sylvester Shaw is a shoemaker by trade who (along with his cat, appropriately named "Shoo-Shoo") operates his own business in a port city. Besides shoemaking, his main passion is ship watching – every Wednesday he closes his shop at noon to watch the ships (especially his favorite, the S. S. Sheba) sail out of port. Shaw dreams of taking an ocean voyage but does not make enough money in his business to do so.

One Wednesday Shaw receives word that the building in which his store is located will be torn down by the city as being a fire hazard, and he must relocate in 30 days. Franklin Flair, owner of a much larger operation (the Fair-and-Square Shoeshop) offers Shaw the opportunity to come work for him, but Shaw declines, wanting to maintain his own business; Flair agrees to hold the offer open should Shaw reconsider.

While ship watching, Sailor O'Shea from the Sheba meets Shaw and, upon learning he is a shoemaker, offers Shaw the chance to repair the shoes of Captain Shipley, the Sheba's captain. When he returns the shoes, Shaw is given a tour of the Sheba and is invited to the ship's party, both then and every time the Sheba is in port.

As the month progresses Shaw is unable to find a suitable building in which to relocate his business; thus, he reluctantly agrees to accept Flair's offer of employment. Flair offers him a window area (with a view of the harbor) and agrees to allow him to hang up his sign as a reminder of his old business. As the Sheba is in port that day, he visits Captain Shipley to notify him of his new address, and is informed of a ship's party the following day, which coincides with Shaw's move to Flair's building.

While Flair's men pack up Shaw's equipment, Sailor O'Shea arrives to take Shaw to the Sheba's party. While at the party Shaw receives a surprise – Flair and Captain Shipley both agreed that Shaw would be happier running his own business, and would love to do so while on a ship; thus, Captain Shipley appoints Shaw "Ship's Shoemaker" and relocates Shaw's entire business to the Sheba, just in time for Sheba's upcoming around-the-world trip.

The story ends with Shaw and Shoo-Shoo having traveled around the world 10 times, with Shaw's business aboard the Sheba being as busy as ever.
