= The Kid Who Only Hit Homers =

1972 children's novel by Matt Christopher

- Author: Matt Christopher
- Publisher: Little, Brown & Co.
- Publication date: March 16, 1972
- ISBN: 1-599-53107-0

The Kid Who Only Hit Homers (1972) is a children's novel about baseball written by American author Matt Christopher. It was the first in a series of four novels featuring a young man (Sylvester Coddmeyer III) who is trained to play baseball by supernatural visitations from former Major League players.

== Plot ==
Sylvester Coddmeyer III is having trouble hitting on his little league baseball team and, as a result, is thinking about quitting baseball. Sylvester loved baseball, but he wasn't what you'd call a good hitter. He had decided against joining the team when he met George Baruth. He promised Sylvester he would help him become one of the best players ever. Before long he was hitting homers. When his friend "Snooky" tries to convince him this mysterious man was just a figment of his imagination, Sylvester tries to prove to him the truth.

== Sequels ==
- Return of the Home Run Kid (1992): Sylvester is no longer in the lineup, and is met by "Cheeko". Sylvester ends his slump but has a bad feeling about "Cheeko", who turns out to be a cheat (as "Cheeko" was in real life, being banned from the sport).
- Comeback of the Home Run Kid (2006): Sylvester begins summer baseball but then sprains his right ankle in a freak accident. He is then met by a mysterious man wearing a New York Yankees hat who offers assistance. However, Sylvester (after his bad experience with "Cheeko" in the prior novel) is not certain he can trust the man. (The plotline closely follows the mysterious man's own freak injury in the 1951 World Series.)
- The Home Run Kid Races On (2010): For the first three seasons, Sylvester has been taught by people who resemble baseball legends. Duane insists the men are impersonators, while Snooky believes the visits are supernatural. In this novel, Sylvester is taught by "Mr. Teacey" while Snooky attempts to get to the bottom of the mystery.
