= Une souris verte =

Song
- Language: French
- English title: A Green Mouse
- Genre: Children's song
- Songwriter: Traditional

"Une souris verte" ("A Green Mouse"), is a French children's song dating back to the 19th century or the end of the 18th century.

There are many variations of the ending of this song.

== Origin ==
This song, commonly known across France and several other francophone countries, dates back to the late 18th century or the early 19th century.

== Lyrics ==
Une souris verte,
Qui courait dans l'herbe,
Je l'attrape par la queue,
Je la montre à ces messieurs.
Ces messieurs me disent :

Trempez-la dans l'huile,
Trempez-la dans l'eau,
Ça fera un escargot tout chaud.

Je la mets dans un tiroir,
Elle me dit qu'il fait trop noir. (1)

Je la mets dans mon chapeau,
Elle me dit qu'il fait trop chaud. (2)

Je la mets dans ma culotte,
Elle me fait trois petites crottes. (3)

Je la mets dans ma main,
Elle me dit qu'elle est très bien. (4)

=== Version 1 ===
(2) and further

Je l’envoie dans son école,
Elle me dit j’en ai ras l'bol.
Je la mets dans son p'tit lit,
Elle me dit j'dois faire pipi.
Je la mets sur un cheval,
Elle me dit joyeux carnaval.

=== Version 2 ===
(3)

Je la mets sur un coussin,
Elle me dit qu'elle est très bien.

Je la mets dans mon p'tit lit,
Elle me dit moi j'reste ici !

=== Version 3 ===
(3) and further

Je la mets dans mes grandes poches,
Elle me dit elles sont trop moches

Je la mets dans ma chemise,
Elle me fait trois petites bises.

Je la mets dans ma culotte,
Elle me fait trois petites crottes !

Je la mets dans mon jardin,
Elle me dit qu'elle s'y sent bien.

=== Version 4 ===
after (3)

Je la mets là dans ma main,
Elle me dit qu'elle est très bien.

Je la mets dans ma cuisine,
Elle me mange toute la farine.

Oh ! La coquine !

=== Version 5 ===
(1) and (2) in reverse order

=== Another version ===
after "Tout chaud."

La cuillère à pot
Dans la rue Carnot
Numéro zéro.
