= Basil of Baker Street =

Children's novels by Eve Titus

Front cover of Basil of Baker Street

Basil of Baker Street is a series of children's novels written by Eve Titus and illustrated by Paul Galdone. The stories focus on the titular Basil of Baker Street and his personal biographer Doctor David Q. Dawson. Together they solve the many crimes and cases of the mouse world. Both live in Holmestead, a mouse community built in the cellar of 221B Baker Street, where Sherlock Holmes is a tenant upstairs.

The five original titles were published from 1958 to 1982 by McGraw-Hill. The series was revived three decades later when a new work was published by Aladdin Paperbacks in October 2018, written by Cathy Hapka and illustrated by David Mottram. Two more books were published in 2019 and 2020.

The 1986 Disney animated feature film The Great Mouse Detective was loosely based on these novels.

== Characters ==
- Basil of Baker Street – "The Sherlock Holmes of the Mouse World"; he is very similar to Holmes (who sometimes used the alias Basil, as in "The Adventure of Black Peter"). His hobbies include archery, archaeology, and mountaineering. Eve Titus gave him the name "Basil" in honor of actor Basil Rathbone, known for his portrayal of Holmes.
- Dr. David Q. Dawson – Basil's personal biographer; based on Dr. John H. Watson from the Sherlock Holmes stories. He is an aficionado of cheese.
- Professor Padraic Ratigan – Basil's archenemy and a master criminal; based on Professor James Moriarty from the Sherlock Holmes story "The Final Problem". Although his name is "Ratigan", in the book series he is a mouse.
- Captain Doran – Ratigan's lieutenant; based on Colonel Sebastian Moran from the Sherlock Holmes story "The Adventure of the Empty House".
- Mademoiselle Relda – An opera singer; based on Irene Adler from the Sherlock Holmes story "A Scandal in Bohemia". Basil is hinted to possess unrequited love for Relda but the background of their relationship is not explored in the books.
- Mrs. Judson – Basil's housekeeper; based on Mrs. Hudson from the Sherlock Holmes stories. She makes an excellent cheese soufflé.

Several supporting characters throughout the books are named for or based on members of the Holmes fan club The Baker Street Irregulars.

== Series ==
The first five books were written by Eve Titus, illustrated by Paul Galdone, and published by McGraw-Hill. The series note "A Basil of Baker Street Mystery" is sometimes cataloged as a subtitle.

1. Basil of Baker Street (1958), 96 pp., LCCN 58-8050 Basil and Dawson go searching for the missing twin children of Mr. and Mrs. Proudfoot. The search takes them from Baker Street to a harbor, and even to the countryside of England. The plot device of a typewriter as the 'smoking gun' is adapted from the Sherlock Holmes story "A Case of Identity".
2. Basil and the Lost Colony (1964) Basil leads an expedition in search of the Lost Colony of the Tellmice. Along the way he is being hunted by Ratigan and his gang.
3. Basil and the Cave of Cats (1971) (published in paperback in the US as Basil and the Pygmy Cats) Basil finds a clue that hints at the existence of Pygmy Cats. He and Dawson search for the truth, all the while escaping Professor Ratigan and Captain Doran. At the same time, they must restore the Maharajah of Bengistan to his throne.
4. Basil in Mexico (1976) About to embark on a trip to Mexico to help out with a case there, Basil is suddenly called upon to solve the Case of the Counterfeit Cheese. Then, upon his arrival in Mexico, he discovers that the famed "mousterpiece", the Mousa Lisa, is missing, and that it is up to him to find the perpetrator. Almost immediately afterwards, Dr. Dawson is kidnapped.
5. Basil in the Wild West (1982) Basil and Dawson continue their North American road trip by solving two mysteries in the Wild West. First, they have to stop a crew of smugglers from taking control of part of the West, and then solve the mystery of the "Thing" who is scaring guests of the Hathaway Hotel.
6. Basil and the Big Cheese Cook-Off (2018) Basil and Dawson journey to Paris to solve a mystery threatening the world-renowned international cheese cook-off cooking competition.
7. Basil and the Royal Dare (May 2019) Basil and Dawson come to the aid of the British and Bohemian Royal Families (of mice), when several royal teens go missing.
8. Basil and the Library Ghost (May 2020) When Basil and Dr. Dawson reunite with old friends, the C for Cheese Gang, at Oxford, they investigate rumors that Ratcliffe College's library is haunted.
