= Neurotically Yours =

- Logo of Neurotically Yours
- Created by: Jonathan Ian Mathers
- Voices of: Jonathan Ian Mathers; Dawn Bennett
- Original language: English

Original release
- Release: September 10, 2001 – present

Neurotically Yours is an animated web series created by Jonathan Ian Mathers, based on the comic of the same name, starring a goth girl named Germaine Endez and her neurotic squirrel roommate, Foamy. Since its inception, the series has received mainly positive reviews from fans for its dark humor.

== History ==
The comic book series was created first. It focused solely on Germaine; Foamy only made random comments about the current situation. Germaine's design was noticeably based on Devi D's design from Jhonen Vasquez's comic I Feel Sick, and Mathers admitted she was a source of inspiration.

The webseries debuted on September 10, 2001. It started with this same set-up, but over the years Germaine's character took a back seat as Foamy developed into an angry, "wisdom-spreading" cult leader and his rants against society became increasingly popular. Episodes are mainly located at Ill Will Press, YouTube, and Newgrounds. A new episode of Neurotically Yours is posted approximately once every two weeks. To date, there are over 400 official episodes of Neurotically Yours. There are also a number of fan-produced episodes circulated among various fan sites on the Internet.

In 2009, Mathers began hosting all of the Neurotically Yours webtoons exclusively on YouTube and Newgrounds. Two reasons provided for the change-over included poor quality copies being made and distributed without credit to Mathers. Mathers also cited overall bandwidth usage, stating that the monthly bills were "insane". Having changed over to YouTube, Mathers was able to provide viewers with a feed to subscribe to more episodes (both current and past episodes), as well as limiting his overall monthly bill, thus making site maintenance easier.

From 2009 to 2011, Mathers published Neurotically Yours in a comic-strip format. Most of the strips were single-panel format, with the occasional entry in two or three panels.

Following the 2016 soft reboot, Neurotically Yours has become one of several series run under the broader Youtube banner of 'Foamy the Squirrel', which also includes his side series Island (focusing on Sue Z. June, Foamy and Pilz-E), his animated rant videos and a roughly-weekly (usually posted on Thursdays or Fridays) video podcast called Squirrels and Robots which he co-hosts with Pilz-E, Begley and a "slightly homicidal A.I." named J.O.S.I. It has been made clear, however, this is simply to please the Youtube algorithm, and the series proper with Germaine and Foamy is still officially Neurotically Yours.

== Plot ==
=== Original series ===
The central story line revolves around the interactions between Foamy and Germaine and, on occasion, their relationships with other characters. The story starts off with Germaine sitting in front of a computer typing away, while Foamy remains a constant distraction in the background and has occasionally contemplated suicide. These themes become the premise for both the main story arc, as well as the development of the characters themselves. As the plot continues to develop, Germaine dedicates her time trying to have her poetry published, spending hours on it and then being rejected.

As time goes on, Germaine becomes the subject of men's attention, while becoming increasingly more comfortable in her own body. Eventually, she attempts to manipulate events via use of her sexuality. However, in later episodes, Germaine discusses the idea of clothing being used to objectify women and expresses dismay with this trend, though it eventually becomes part of her character. She works as a prostitute to support herself.

After a journey of self-discovery, Germaine eventually ends up in the same general cycle she was in before. She finds herself in opposition to various issues regarding women and even blaming these issues for causing people to accept such degrading roles in life. Even with all the self-development, self-discovery, and enlightening moments, Germaine seemingly develops into the same role she had prior to leaving. She struggles with weight and image issues, and yet again feels discriminated against.

=== Reboot (2011) ===
In August 2011, the cartoon was rebooted. Creator Jonathan Ian Mathers posted in his blog and Facebook: "Is it really the last Foamy episode? No. It's just a way to start things over." Mathers acknowledged that the cartoon had become increasingly mature and dark, which had caused reader confusion and loss of his younger audience. The reboot promised that Germaine will make "better choices" and that the "sexual content will be dropped by 90% at least", although the comic will still be aimed at adults.

A Topical Rant was released along with the first episode of the reboot. In it, Foamy blasts Hollywood for its many unsuccessful reboots but points out that reboots can work when done right. The squirrel states that the creator will focus his efforts on only one web-series. It will be "a bit shinier" in style, although Foamy "will still be ticked off" and Germaine "will still be jiggly". He exhorts his listeners to "just ******* relax".

Within the cartoon, Germaine is given the option by Foamy to reset her life, thus undoing the previous ten years of her life. Foamy describes this as being a do over of "everything", which he has given out only three times before. The reboot involves a physical move: they move out of New York City to a small town in Connecticut. This changes Germaine's "personal turmoil" from financial to not fitting in, while Foamy is "150%" angrier.

=== Post reboot ===
Germaine makes attempts to reform her character and personality, including changing her hair and getting breast-reduction surgery. Despite Mathers's claims however, not long after the reboot the series began to return to the original style, relying heavily on jokes and content derived on Germaine's sexuality. Germaine returns to using her sexuality to financially support herself.

In January 2015, Foamy moves out in protest over Germaine's "stupidity" and makes his home in a post-office box.

The apparent continued focus on other characters in the series was also quickly dropped, leaving only more known series regulars such as Pilz-e and Begely.

However, on September 10, 2015, Mathers uploaded a new cartoon, revealing that Germaine had suffered a mental breakdown. The episode picks up six months after the previous one, and the new cartoon showed her meeting Foamy outside a mental hospital in New York City, and it was revealed that much of the sexual content shown in past cartoons had actually been a series of hallucinations by Germaine. Mathers said that he had been planning the episode for a long time, and had deliberately reverted to crude sexual humor in order to emphasize how the pressure of a sexually obsessed society can warp women's perspectives.

Mathers now claims that Germaine will "rebuild herself", and says that "[Germaine] will be a little darker, and a bit more jaded, but she'll figure things out."

== Card Cult ==
Foamy has established the "Cult of Foamy", also known as the "Card Cult".

In the real world, the cult advertises the Ill Will Press website. Mailing in for a card is no longer required to join, as Mathers has created a downloadable cult pack that includes printable cards, a cut-out Foamy "virtual relic", an MP3 of the cult song, and digital files including wallpaper. Official cards can still be requested and autographed ones can be purchased from Mathers. The website shop also offers trading cards, T-shirts, CDs and DVDs, books, and toys.

In the comic, the Card Cult's rise correlates to Foamy's development, in terms of his rants and increasing importance relative to Germaine. The points of the cult are "the slow demise of the human race through squirrelly force" and to "take over the world". When a member posits that the human race will eventually self-destruct anyway, Foamy replies that they can still "speed up the process."

In terms of the story, there have been many secrets surrounding the Cult of Foamy. One conspiracy theorist believes that Foamy has lived an unnaturally long life with many owners (who were later found dead), and has "over the years" been "amassing his minions" while subtly trying to take over the world through various means of influence. Foamy alludes to his power over the world and time when he offers the reset button to Germaine in 2011; the reboot does not eliminate the Cult, although it "sets it back a bit".

The number of members is a mystery. In each of the two Cult Meeting episodes, the only attendants are Foamy, Pilz-E, and Begley. In contrast, at one point 3,000 people gathered outside Germaine's apartment "with offerings of bagels and cream cheese".

== Fictional character biographies ==
=== Animal characters ===
Foamy the Squirrel is an opinionated, foul-mouthed squirrel who lives with his owner Germaine. Foamy and Germaine both speak out against the stupidity, injustice, and annoyances they perceive in life – both their fictional life or in the real world. Foamy's other appearances in the web series include singing "Squirrel Songs" (to raise money for the "Church of Foamy") and answering "Foamy Fan Mail" (which he hates, finding the questions stupid or repetitive). Foamy is 400 years old and has had 632 owners. His stated purpose is to take over the world; for this purpose he founded the Foamy Card Cult, and he combined old robots with the brains of his former owners to create an army.

Pilz-E is an insane, bespectacled squirrel who is addicted to medication for a number of psychosomatic sicknesses. There is also implication that he is being used for medical experiments. Pilz-E's banter is often nonsensical, caused by medication-induced hallucinations. He is good hearted, but he tends to misunderstand words or take people (usually Germaine) too literally. Despite being considered Foamy's friend, Foamy seems to find it hard at times to deal with his drugged up behavior. Germaine brought Pilz-E with her to Connecticut because she feels he cannot be left alone.

The Hatta is a black squirrel who is both a stereotype for and very defensive of African-American culture. He is quick to pull the race card in any situation and has even starred in his own rants. Much like Begley, he appears less frequently in the series than either Pilz-E or Germaine.

Begley is a purple-mohawked British squirrel who rebels against authority figures and generally fulfills the stereotype of punk. He came to New York in Anchovie's suitcase, following jail time for calling the Queen a "wanka". He enjoys sexuality (unlike Foamy), although he is willing to help Foamy commit acts of mischief. He backpacked to Germaine's new home in Connecticut, angry at her for leaving him behind in New York with Anchovy. He appears infrequently in the series, sometimes breaking the fourth wall to ask for more episodes.

Roswell is Jack Partfine's dog. He believes Foamy is an old evil cult leader bent on world domination, or possibly the mythical squirrel Ratatoskr or a descendant. He serves as a foil to Foamy; one of the few characters who does not underestimate him in any way, yet is ignored by the rest of the world. In the reboot he, like Foamy, whines about Connecticut and longs to move back to New York.

Puff is Betty's pet cat who listens to music and is always seen wearing pink headphones.

=== Human characters ===
Germaine Endez is Foamy's "owner" through most of the episodes. Originally living in a New York City apartment, she moved to her grandfather's Connecticut house after the 2011 reboot. Her struggles provide angst for Neurotically Yours: she is a poet seeking publication, she is highly sexualized, she overeats and has weight issues, she experiments with witchcraft and meditation but seems to be an atheist, she changes her bra/cup size multiple times through surgery and magic, and her indecision between heterosexuality and bisexuality have pushed Foamy to demand she "pick a side already". Germaine also constantly suffers from money problems; her spotty employment record includes working in an occult bookstore, prostitute, sales clerk at Walk-Mart, nude model for a New York art school, and barista at Starschmucks. In the early episodes, Germaine was flat chested, and a more stereotypical Goth/Punk, somewhat feminist young woman; before the reboot, her appearance often changed, mostly in her weight, bust size, hair style/color. After the reboot, Germaine attempted to better herself by getting breast-reduction surgery and abandoning her gothic fashion sense, although she eventually failed to do so, reversing her breast-reduction and readapting her gothic style.

Anchovie Allcock, also known as Pizza Guy, is Germaine's stalker and a general pervert. Originally a failing pizza delivery boy in England, he moved to New York after seeing Germaine on FaceNook. He has had various jobs: pizza delivery man, clerk at Burger Goo, security guard at a lingerie shop, and gym teacher. He is a very persistent and proficient stalker, secretly photographing Germaine to post on a website and finding ways to interact with her. Anchovie hates Foamy because the squirrel foils many of his plans for Germaine; Foamy, on the other hand, just thinks Anchovie is pathetic. Germaine kills and dismembers Anchovie in the background of a Topical Rant, but he subsequently reappeared in a post-reboot and Begley has told Germaine that he has taken to performing more disturbing acts of stalking in Germaine's absence like collecting left-behind hair. After Germaine underwent breast-reduction surgery, Anchovie was horrified, revealing his obsession with Germaine to be 100% superficial in nature.

Franklin O'Kee is an elitist who loves working at Starshmuck's coffee shop. He despises Foamy, who refuses to kowtow to "coffee house propaganda" and grows increasingly irate at the difficulty of getting a regular cup of coffee. Franklin's homosexuality is implied throughout the series, with acknowledgement after the reboot. He eventually quit working at Starsmucks in an attempt to open his own homosexual-themed coffee shop with Germaine as a business partner, although the blatantness of the coffee shop's theme lead to poor business and his castration by Germaine out of frustration.

Mammed Udi is a hard-working Hindu man from India. His jobs include technical support for Smell Tech Computers, an Eaters Anonymous hotline that Germaine calls, a suicide hotline operator, and the pharmacist who supplies Pilz-E's medications.

Joanna, or "Mutie", was Germaine's mute female roommate. She was physically distracting "eye candy", with blond hair in ponytails, blue eyes, and an exaggerated breast size. She appeared in a number of initially unreleased episodes. In "Cute Mute", it is revealed that Germaine brought her home from a party because she was drunk, but she decides to room there to help with bills. Joanna's last appearance was in the episode "Hot Enough For You?", where she is pulled underwater by a mysterious tentacle. However, she appears briefly at the end of the "An Arthouse Halloween" episode released on October 16, 2012.

Jack Partfine is a cryptozoologist from New York who moved to Connecticut because his profession could not cover his expenses. He is good-natured, friendly, and constantly apologizing for the accusations blurted by his dog, Roswell. However, he does appear to be slightly paranoid and a conspiracy theorist. Introduced in the episode "Secrets of The Foamy Cult", he is the first human introduced since the reboot.

Dia is a religious-minded young woman who left India to avoid an arranged marriage to Mammed Udi, and find purpose to her life. She believes she may be hallucinating after she discovers some expired tofu in her fridge that talks and moves. In addition to a cameo appearance in the Neurotically Yours episode "Midnight Release", Dia had two episodes of her own series with Tofu, called Dia & Tofu.

Betty Bo'Qua, a.k.a. "The Previous Owner", is Foamy's owner before Germaine. Against Foamy's advice, Betty performed witchcraft to become a shemale; she drew the ire of demonic spirits and, as a result, must perform an annual ritual if she wants to keep living. She also performs off Broadway from time to time.

Ollie is Germaine's grandfather. Ollie took it upon himself to raise Germaine after her father left her and her mother was deemed unfit to parent. Ollie is an old school New York citizen whose years of city-living made him hardened and sarcastic. He appears cold at times, but does his best to raise his granddaughter, even if it means letting her make her own mistakes. Ollie appears solely in the Chibisodes, being introduced in "New Phone". In the present day, he currently lives in Florida while Germaine house sits his Connecticut house. He has yet to make an appearance in the present day however.

Salt Forester is Foamy's new owner, who is introduced in the episode "Mail Friend". Salt is an aspiring novelist with a scratchy voice who reluctantly takes in Foamy so he can get his P.O. box back after Foamy took up residence. His work is noted to be rather poor by Foamy, and uses waffles as a recurring theme, though Foamy, since first meeting him, has managed to get him to cut down the amount of waffle material Salt has written. Until recently, Salt and his roommate Sue lived in a storage unit, claiming it was the cheapest possible option in New York City. Sue has since moved out of the unit (see below).

Sue Z. June is Salt's roommate introduced in the episode "New Room". She is a mute by choice and communicates mostly through texting, otherwise appearing stoic and completely emotionless. Salt says that the only time Sue ever spoke, she said, "I don't speak because no one listens." Salt tries to stay on her good side because she has a mean streak and a tendency for tazing other people with little or no provocation, which causes Foamy to take an instant liking to her. Sue has since replaced Germaine as Foamy's verbal foil and musical accompaniment, despite her refusal to react to his ranting, other than responding with different emojis to show her emotional replies. It's also indicated that she plays Roller-Derby and has become notorious for ripping off opponents' limbs. Recently, Sue relocated to a supposedly "remote island" location to get away from people (yet it still has a local coffee shop), but Foamy and Pilz-E found her and immediately moved in.
