= Urban Vermin =

Canadian animated television series

- Garbage Liberation Front (GLF) – the team of vermin fighting for liberation of their block.
- Created by: Diana Arruda; Tim Thompson
- Country of origin: Canada
- Original language: English
- No. of episodes: 26

Production
- Executive producers: Beth Stevenson; Anne Loi
- Producer: Kym Hyde
- Running time: 22 minutes
- Production company: Decode Entertainment (Note: As Urban Productions Inc.)

Original release
- Network: YTV
- Release: October 8 – November 12, 2007

Urban Vermin is a Canadian animated television series produced by Decode Entertainment for YTV. The series takes place in a world of anthropomorphic animals, where a pair of raccoons named Abe and Ken who work together in a war battle between good and evil. Abe's team is called the GLF (Garbage Liberation Front), along with Coco, Nigel and Madman, while Ken's army is simply called TRA (The Rat Army), alongside No-Neck and Zitzy. The series aired from October 8 to November 12, 2007. 26 episodes were produced.

== Premise ==
Urban Vermin is a story about two raccoon brothers that were once best friends until Ken decided to assemble an army of rats to help him seize control of all the garbage on their block. Abe decides to strike back against his evil brother and assembles his team of resistance fighters to help him free the block of Ken's reign.

== Characters ==
=== Main heroes ===
- Abe (voiced by Gabe Plener) – The leader of the GLF. Abe is a young brown raccoon who wears a lime green shirt, dark green camouflage pants, and a green hat with a pair of goggles. He is adventurous, brave, and a huge fan of Manchego cheese. He possesses boundless energy, a mind for keen strategy, tons of fortitude, and an endless supply of goodwill towards all verminkind. His trademarks are his trusty antenna staff, his trusty tape measure, his unexplainable fear of ladybugs, and his die-hard belief in truth, justice and the vermin way. Abe does not always practice what he preaches, but will usually admit to making a mistake. He loves pulling pranks on Ken and eating molten chocolate cake. Abe hates his birthday, mostly because he shares it with his younger brother, Ken. He gets excited about secret planning tables, missions, and banana peels. Abe is the leader of the GLF, which operates out of a master control center hidden deep inside a backyard tree. There is enough garbage in the alleys to share if Ken does not succeed in hoarding it all. A fierce rivalry with Abe's brother Ken has always existed and always kept them at odds. There was even a time when Abe was the rebellious teen and Ken the goody mama's boy; however, Abe is now the good guy while Ken is the control freak evil dictator who rules the block with an iron paw.
- Coco (voiced by Alyson Court) – The mechanic of the GLF. Coco is a fearless, orange flying squirrel who worked for Ken, but switched to Abe's side to use her genius for good instead. She graduated top of her class at Vermin High Rocket Scientist School. Her thesis project was inventing a time machine that could travel half a second into the past. It was brilliant but useless. She worked at a comic shop and developed an obsession with science fiction. Around this time she also found an abandoned shed full of spare parts and started inventing amazing, brilliantly useful things. Ken offered Coco a contract, so she moved into the ice cream truck and took it from there. Within a year she could see the error of her ways; every citizen in the block was utterly miserable. Now she works for Abe. She shares a clubhouse with three smelly boys. Like any other team, they complement each other but can also get under each other's skin as Coco's stubbornness is pretty legendary. She is aware that Nigel has a crush on her, but she denies liking him back. She took ten years of accordion lessons, which is revealed in "Raiders of the Lost Kazoo".
- Nigel (voiced by Dwayne Hill) – The muscle of the GLF. Nigel is a powder blue mole who has the strength of ten ordinary vermin, he's a talented tunneler, and, also, blind as a mole. Nigel was the second member of the GLF after its founder, Abe. Abe tried to go it alone, got ambushed by a rat patrol, and Nigel jumped in to save him. Nigel is so blind that he actually thought he was saving a beautiful damsel in distress at the time. But fate was sealed. Nigel's sense of loyalty, happy-go-lucky-ness, and clumsiness knows no bounds. He loves to tell long-winded stories and jokes that are not funny—though he thinks they are. Nigel grew up in a big family of funny moles, most being quite gifted when it comes to comedic timing. Nigel grew up in the shadow of his siblings, becoming a student of comedy. He knows a lot about the craft; he is just not funny himself. Throughout the series, it is shown he has a huge crush on Coco, but is too shy to tell her.
- Madman (voiced by Joseph Motiki) – The last of the GLF. Madman is a black and white striped skunk who has no chance of smell, and he has an ability to think in ways most other vermin never could. This is both a source of weakness and enormous strength that's an asset to the team. Despite his ridiculous ideas mentioned in a variety of voices and personas, he says the right thing at the right time and comes up with the solution to a problem too big for anyone else to comprehend. She joined the GLF by ripping down all the recruitment posters so he was sure to be the only one to join up. He actually thought they were tasty and ended up eating them all by accident. Before that he was born in Stinkton who wandered away one day and got adopted by a family of 2 Legs.

=== Allies ===
- Chuck – he is a chipmunk. He wants to join the GLF. Madman is Chuck's idol. He failed in training but he can join the GLF.
- TeDe (TD) – he is a skunk and leader of the Stink Club.
- Winston – he is a skunk from Stinkton, Madman's real hometown. He is Madman's twin brother.
- Biffy – he is a mole and Nigel's nephew. He sports a red mohawk and wears a green outfit, including a green vest, green camouflage pants, and a red shirt.
- Hans Flix – he is a Marmot and lives with his mother.
- Juanita – she is a raccoon and the mayor of the Block. She has a soft spot for Abe. Madman has a huge crush on her.
- JP – he is an informant of the GLF and Ken's Rat Army. He lives in shadows. He does not choose sides.
- Nero – Nero is a scientifically enhanced cybernetic chihuahua. Zitzy decided to enhance him, to make him better, stronger, faster, but he is on GLF's side. He first appeared in "Dog of War".

=== Villains ===
==== Main ====
- Ken (voiced by Scott McCord) – Ken is Abe's brother who is petty, egomaniacal, lazy, cruel, greedy, jealous, vain, and cheats at hopscotch. He was born to be a dictator, and his closest confidante is a pink flamingo scepter named Penelope. Spoiled rotten as a kid by his mother, he simply could never live in a world where he could not continue his spoiled rotten lifestyle. His brother growing up was Abe, who was not as spoiled, because raccoons always spoil the youngest—it is a tradition. He currently rules the Block, controlling as much of the garbage as he can. Only the GLF keep him from absolute control on a daily basis. They can often be found dining and dancing together in the throne room. He operates out of an old ice cream truck he refers to as the Lair or the Evil Pizzeria of Doom.
- No-Neck (voiced by Yannick Bisson) – No-Neck is a gray rat serving as the Colonel of the Rat Army. Although he runs a tight ship, he likes playing the harp, collecting cocktail umbrellas, and singing karaoke.
- Zitzy (voiced by Adam Reid) – Zitzy is a Team Tryanny's Resident Evil Scientist. He is a brown possum who faints a lot, even when he is just frustrated. He was just a possum with diabolical dreams and a scientific calculator when the Empire was at the feet of Ken and Coco. When she left, he lied on his resume and got the job. He has never, ever been able to measure up to Coco. He steals all her ideas from all the blueprints she left behind, but it is hard to replicate them without making something blow up. But the reason he lied on his resume in the first place is because he knows he is a genius, light years ahead of his time, and he just knows that the world of evil doing is nothing without him.

==== Minor ====
- Fake Mommy – she is a thief. She tricks Ken and Abe. She stole Ken and Abe's items.
- Kim Jong Shrill – he works for Ken's army, but he betrays Ken and tries to kill him and No-Neck. He hates dirt and microbes. His name is a pun on Kim Jong-il.

== Gadgets and items ==
- Alleycat: Alleycat is GLF's toy car and war machine.
- Krusher: Krusher is Ken's extreme monster truck.
- B.A.G. 3000: B.A.G. 3000 is a dangerous weapon created by Coco. The weapon's effect is laughing. But the last one is most dangerous. So Coco was thrown last one. Zitzy takes plans for the B.A.G. 3000 and makes it. Zitzy's B.A.G. 3000 was destroyed by Madman.
- Robotic Juanita: Created by Zitzy. Ken needs it because he wants to become the Block's new mayor.
- Dirty Donut Machine: Created by Zitzy. It makes dirty donuts. Dirty donut's effect is zombify vermin.
- Space-Time Continuum Harp: Created by Coco. The effect is to briefly stun vermin at the talent show just long enough for the GLF to swoop in and steal the shrimp ring. Coco makes a mistake; she opens a hole in the space-time continuum. Coco and Nigel are doomed to repeat the same mission.
- Kazoo of Doom: Used by Tabba in the past at the war. Effect of the kazoo is of controlling rats.

== Broadcast ==
Urban Vermin was broadcast on YTV from October 8 to November 12, 2007.

Jetix Europe acquired Urban Vermin for broadcast in Europe, with Buena Vista International Television handling television distribution sales.

== Home media ==
The home video distributor KaBoom! Entertainment have brought the rights to the show with Nelvana distributed by the company. Peace Arch Entertainment released two DVDs in 2008 and they are titled Arms Race and Battle of the Brothers. Each release uses the English and French tracks. Every release contains three episodes.

== Reception ==
The Globe and Mail praised the look of the series, stating that the "computer-generated animation is crisp and visually compelling".
