= The Great Mouse Detective =

1986 animated mystery film

- Theatrical release poster
- Directed by: John Musker; Ron Clements; Dave Michener; Burny Mattinson
- Story by: Pete Young; Vance Gerry; Steve Hulett; Ron Clements; John Musker; Bruce M. Morris; Matthew O'Callaghan; Burny Mattinson; Dave Michener; Melvin Shaw
- Based on: Basil of Baker Street by: Eve Titus; Paul Galdone
- Produced by: Burny Mattinson
- Starring: Vincent Price; Barrie Ingham; Val Bettin; Susanne Pollatschek; Candy Candido; Diana Chesney; Eve Brenner; Alan Young
- Edited by: Roy M. Brewer Jr.; James Melton
- Music by: Henry Mancini
- Production company: Walt Disney Feature Animation
- Distributed by: Buena Vista Distribution (Note: Distributed under the Walt Disney Pictures banner.)
- Release date: July 2, 1986
- Running time: 74 minutes
- Country: United States
- Language: English
- Budget: $14 million
- Box office: $50 million

The Great Mouse Detective (Note: Released as Basil the Great Mouse Detective in some countries and The Adventures of the Great Mouse Detective during its 1992 re-release.) is a 1986 American animated adventure film based on the children's book series Basil of Baker Street by Eve Titus and Paul Galdone and produced by Walt Disney Feature Animation. Directed by John Musker, Dave Michener, Ron Clements, and Burny Mattinson, it features the voices of Vincent Price, Barrie Ingham, Val Bettin, Susanne Pollatschek, Candy Candido, Diana Chesney, Eve Brenner, and Alan Young. The plot follows a mouse detective who undertakes to help a young mouse find and save her father from the criminal mastermind Professor Ratigan.

The Great Mouse Detective draws heavily on the tradition of Sherlock Holmes with a heroic mouse who consciously emulates the detective. Titus named the main character after actor Basil Rathbone, who is best remembered for playing Holmes in film (and whose voice, sampled from a 1966 reading of "The Red-Headed League" was the voice of Holmes in this film, nearly 19 years after his death). Sherlock Holmes also mentions "Basil" as one of his aliases in the Arthur Conan Doyle story "The Adventure of Black Peter".

The Great Mouse Detective was released to theaters on July 2, 1986, to positive reviews from critics and financial success, in sharp contrast to the box office underperformance of Disney's previous animated feature film, The Black Cauldron (1985). The film's timely success has been credited with keeping Walt Disney Animation going after the previous film's failure by renewing upper management's confidence in the department, thus setting the stage for the Disney Renaissance when feature animated films would become the corporation's most lucrative and prestigious product.

== Plot ==
In 1897 London, a young mouse named Olivia Flaversham celebrates her birthday with her single father, Mr. Flaversham, who is a gifted toymaker. A bat with a crippled wing and a peg leg arrives and kidnaps Flaversham. Olivia leaves to find Basil of Baker Street, the famous Great Mouse Detective. David Q. Dawson, a retired army surgeon mouse newly returned from Afghanistan, meets Olivia and escorts her to Basil's residence.

Basil initially dismisses them, but when Olivia mentions the bat that abducted her father, Basil realizes that Olivia saw Fidget, the assistant of Professor Ratigan, the criminal mastermind whom Basil was working to catch. It is then revealed that Ratigan kidnapped Flaversham to force him to create a clockwork robot replica of the Queen of the Mice, so that Ratigan can usurp her place as "Supreme Ruler of all Mousedom". Flaversham initially refuses to participate in the scheme, but capitulates when Ratigan threatens to harm Olivia.

Fidget appears in Basil's window, then suddenly disappears. Basil, Dawson and Olivia take Toby, Sherlock Holmes' pet Basset Hound, to trail Fidget's scent. They trace the bat to a human-sized toyshop. While searching the area, Dawson finds Fidget's checklist, and Basil discovers Fidget has been stealing clockwork mechanisms and toy soldiers' uniforms. Fidget ambushes and kidnaps Olivia before Basil and Dawson can stop him.

Basil conducts chemical tests to the checklist, discovering it came from the "Rat Trap", a tavern near the junction of the sewer and the Thames. Basil and Dawson disguise themselves as sailors and head to the tavern. They spot Fidget, and follow him to Ratigan's headquarters, only to be ambushed by Ratigan and his henchmen. Ratigan has the pair tied to a spring-loaded mousetrap connected to a Rube Goldberg machine of various killing devices. Ratigan then sets out for Buckingham Palace, where his henchmen hijack the royal guards' roles and kidnap the Mouse Queen. Inspired by a remark Dawson made, Basil deduces the trap's weakness, freeing himself, Dawson and Olivia.

At Buckingham Palace, Ratigan forces Flaversham to operate the toy Queen, while the real one is taken to be fed to Felicia, Ratigan's pet cat. The toy Queen declares Ratigan the ruler of all Mousedom, and he announces his dictatorial plans for his new "subjects". After Basil, Dawson, and Olivia save Flaversham and the real Queen, they restrain Fidget and Ratigan's other henchmen, while Toby chases Felicia until she jumps over a wall, into a pack of Royal Guard Dogs. Basil seizes control of the mechanical queen, making it denounce Ratigan as a fraud while breaking it into pieces. Realizing Ratigan's treason, the enraged crowd attacks, but Ratigan escapes on his dirigible with Fidget, holding Olivia hostage.

Basil, Dawson, and Flaversham create an airship from a matchbox, balloons, and a Union Jack, setting off in pursuit. Ratigan tosses Fidget overboard to lighten the load. Basil jumps onto the dirigible to confront Ratigan, causing it to crash straight into Big Ben's clockface. Inside the clocktower, Basil restrains Ratigan, rescues Olivia, and safely delivers her to Flaversham. Ratigan breaks free and attacks Basil, just before the clock strikes 10:00; the vibrations cause Ratigan to fall to his death. He attempts to take Basil with him, but Basil grabs a part of Ratigan's dirigible and saves himself.

Back at Baker Street, the group recounts their adventures. The Flavershams bid a fond farewell and leave to catch their train. Dawson reluctantly resolves to leave as well, until a new distressed client arrives. Basil introduces Dawson to her as his friend and investigative partner, prompting Dawson to remain and assist in Basil's future cases.

== Voice cast ==
- Vincent Price as Professor Ratigan, a villainous rat who hates being reminded of being one, and Basil's long-established arch-enemy.
- Barrie Ingham as Basil, a brilliant mouse detective from London's Baker Street.
  - Ingham also voices Bartholomew, a drunken mouse lackey of Ratigan.
- Val Bettin as David Q. Dawson, previously of the Queen's 66th Regiment in Afghanistan. He eventually becomes Basil's associate, friend, and personal biographer. Dawson also serves as the film's narrator.
  - Bettin also voices a thug guard of Ratigan.
- Susanne Pollatschek as Olivia Flaversham, a young Scottish mouse who seeks Basil's help in finding her father.
- Candy Candido as Fidget, Ratigan's bumbling bat right-hand henchman who cannot fly because of a crippled wing.
  - Candido also voices a reprobate in the pub.
- Diana Chesney as Mrs. Judson, Basil's mouse housekeeper who is often exasperated by his antics.
- Eve Brenner as the Mouse Queen, whom Ratigan attempts to depose.
- Alan Young as Mr. Flaversham, Olivia's affectionate Scottish father who owns a toy shop.
- Shani Wallis as Lady Mouse, the female mouse that Basil and Dawson agree to help at the end of the film.

Basil Rathbone voices Sherlock Holmes, the famous human detective who lives above Basil. The voice of Rathbone (who had died in 1967) is taken from the 1966 Caedmon Records recording of the Sherlock Holmes story "The Red-Headed League". Voice samples of Nigel Bruce were not used for the voice of Watson, Holmes' medical associate, because a similar recording of him was not available. Laurie Main portrays Watson.

Wayne Allwine, Tony Anselmo, and Walker Edmiston voice Ratigan's thug guards. Melissa Manchester also appears as the dancing mouse who sings "Let Me Be Good To You".

== Production ==
The idea of doing an animated film about Sherlock Holmes with animals was first discussed during the production of The Rescuers. Veteran layout artist Joe Hale is credited with suggesting to adapt the children's book series Basil of Baker Street by Eve Titus, but the project fell into development limbo because of the similarities to The Rescuers. In 1982, Ron Clements proposed adapting the children's book series into an animated feature and, along with story artist Pete Young, it was pitched to Disney president Ron Miller, who approved the project. Earlier in his career, Clements created a 15-minute Sherlock Holmes animated short recorded on Super 8 film. Because the animators were displeased with the direction The Black Cauldron was heading, Basil of Baker Street was approved as an alternative project.

Burny Mattinson and John Musker were assigned as the original directors while Dave Michener was also added as co-director. Miller became the producer for the film. The first idea for the victim was for Olivia—then an older and potential love interest whom Dawson falls for, but Miller suggested the character be "a little girl, someone they [the audience] can feel sorry for." One of the dropped characters was a stool pigeon who always hung around Buckingham Palace and tipped Basil off about the skullduggery. The writers dropped the characters deciding for Basil to figure it out for himself.

With the departure of Miller in 1984, the board of directors appointed Michael Eisner, who had resigned from Paramount Pictures, to become the new CEO. Eisner recruited former production head Jeffrey Katzenberg to become studio chairman over Disney's film division. Following a story reel screening of Basil, Eisner and Katzenberg complained about the slow pacing of the story and ordered for rewrites before animation would commence. Although the intended release was set for Christmas 1987, Eisner slashed the projected production budget at $24 million in half where it was green-lit at $10 million and moved the release date up to July 1986 giving the production team one year to complete the film. To replace Miller who had been producer, Feature Animation chairman Roy E. Disney assigned Mattinson to serve as director/producer, but finding both tasks much too laborious, Mattinson decided to remain as producer. Musker and Michener remained as directors, but with the shortened production schedule, Clements became an additional director.

Following the box office under-performance of the 1985 Paramount/Amblin film Young Sherlock Holmes, Eisner decided to rename Basil of Baker Street into The Great Mouse Detective, feeling the name "Basil" was "too English". The re-titling of the film proved to be unpopular with the filmmakers so much that animator Ed Gombert wrote a satirical interoffice memo, allegedly by studio executive Peter Schneider, which gave preceding Disney films generic titles such as Seven Little Men Help a Girl, The Wonderful Elephant Who Could Really Fly, The Little Deer Who Grew Up, The Girl with the See-through Shoes, Two Dogs Fall in Love, Puppies Taken Away, and A Boy, a Bear and a Big Black Cat. Some of the generic titles later became part of a category on the January 1, 1987 episode of Jeopardy!.

=== Casting ===
Following a succession of American and British actors who read for the part of Basil, Royal Shakespeare actor Barrie Ingham won the role within six minutes of his audition. Val Bettin was co-director Ron Clements's first choice for Dawson. For Olivia, Susanne Pollatschek was selected over hundreds of other applicants while Alan Young, who had voiced Scrooge McDuck for Mickey's Christmas Carol, was selected to voice her father Hiriam because of his authentic Scottish brogue.

When the filmmakers watched the 1950 comedy film Champagne for Caesar to study Ronald Colman's performance as a possible model for Basil, they immediately decided to cast Vincent Price, who also starred in the film, as Ratigan. A veteran actor for 52 years, Price was willing to do an audition commenting "If anybody but Disney had asked me, I would have been offended." Following a voice test, veteran voice artist Candy Candido recorded his dialogue for Fidget in one hour. To heighten the pitch, the tape recording of his voice was sped up. Candido's natural voice was kept for one character shouting "Get off, you eight-legged bum."

=== Animation ===
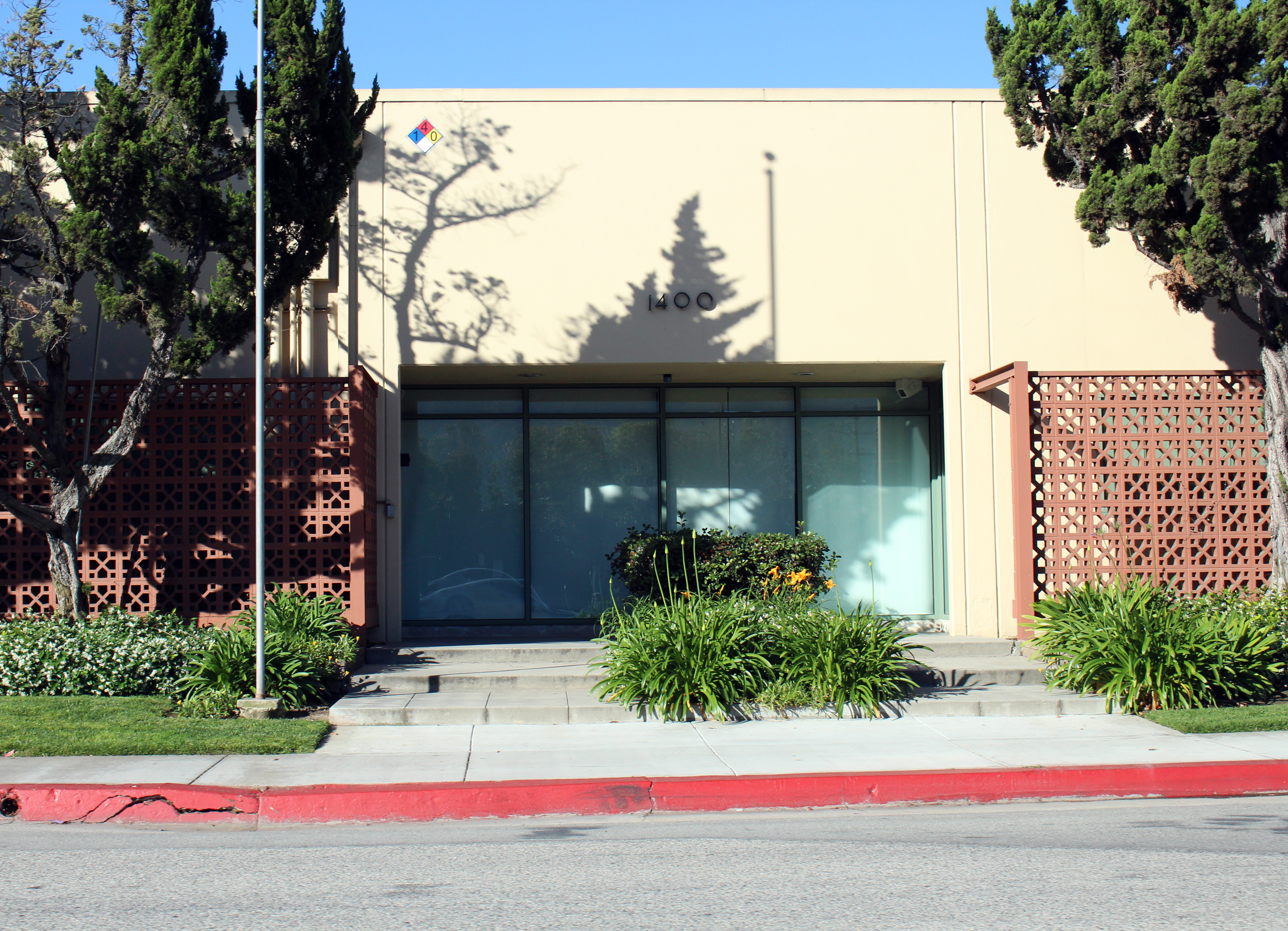
Before the box office failure of The Black Cauldron, the animation unit on The Great Mouse Detective was moved to animate the film at 1400 Flower Street in Glendale, California (pictured here).

Basil was first modeled on Bing Crosby, but the animators eventually took inspiration from Leslie Howard. Initially, Ratigan had been designed as thin, weasely, and ratlike. Following the screening of Champagne for Caesar, Glen Keane noted that following the casting of Price, "his expressive voice and attitude inspired us to further redesign the character." Additionally, during one story meeting, Glen Keane decided to base the stature of Ratigan on then-Disney CEO Ron Miller, who was a 6'6" former football player for the Los Angeles Rams. Furthermore, Keane lifted his personality as he was thumbing through these "photographs of people of London in the 1800s, of railroad men, and there was this one guy smoking a cigar—he had a top hat and there was just something about this guy—this Ratigan ... this rat sucking the cigar, completely dressed to the hilt, he was sharp and perfect—he's a sewer rat dressed like a king and he lives as a king!" The following supervising animators included Mark Henn for Basil, Hendel Butoy for Dawson, Rob Minkoff for Olivia, Andreas Deja for Queen Moustoria, Ruben Aquino for Mrs. Judson, and Mike Gabriel for Toby and Felicia.

The original finale was to take place on the hands of Big Ben with Ratigan eventually falling to his demise. However, layout artist Mike Peraza approached Musker with the idea of restaging the final confrontation so the characters would break through the face of Big Ben with the grinding clockwork gears providing added menace, in which Musker agreed. Peraza's inspiration for the scene was a Japanese anime film, The Castle of Cagliostro (1979), the feature film debut of animator Hayao Miyazaki which is part of the Lupin III franchise; The Castle of Cagliostro, which Peraza was a fan of, featured a climactic scene involving characters amidst giant turning gears in a clock tower. Pereza and his team was sent to London for video reference and were granted unprecedented access to the clockworks inside Big Ben. Because the bells would chime at every quarter-hour, the team completed their research in one hour.

Animators Phil Nibbelink and Tad Gielow spent months designing the interior of Big Ben at the Feature Animation building, with each gear produced as wire-frame graphics on a computer that was printed out and traced onto animation cels onto which the colors and characters were added. The two-minute climax scene thus used computer-generated imagery (CGI), making it the first Disney film to extensively use computer animation, a fact that Disney used to promote the film during marketing.

The film was the last work to feature Eric Larson as an animation consultant before his retirement. Larson was the last of Disney's Nine Old Men, the group that had defined much of Disney's theatrical direction since the 1930s. The character of Dr. Dawson was modeled on Larson as a tribute.

== Music ==
The Adventures of the Great Mouse Detective (Original Motion Picture Soundtrack)

Soundtrack album by Various artists
- Released: 1992
- Label: Varèse Sarabande
- Producer: Henry Mancini

Unusually for a Disney animated feature, there was no soundtrack album released alongside the film; it was released in 1992 alongside the film's reissue under its new title by Varèse Sarabande, one of the few Disney cartoons to have an original soundtrack on the label to date (and the only one not to be issued under a Walt Disney imprint). The album marked the debut of Henry Mancini for score composition of an animated feature aside from the animated opening for The Pink Panther.

Initially, Mancini composed a song titled "Are You the One Who Loves Me?" to serve as a parody of a Victorian British music hall. Already in rough animation, the song was recorded by Shani Wallis. However, Katzenberg and the new management desired a more contemporary song as they would help make the film more marketable. Michael Jackson was considered by Eisner to voice a character who would enter the saloon, confront Basil, and sing a song at the tavern, but the suggestion was met with uncomfortable silence for which Eisner withdrew the idea; Eisner later proposed for Madonna to perform the song. Eventually, Melissa Manchester was brought in; she wrote and performed "Let Me Be Good to You", by which the rough animation had to be re-timed and often re-animated to properly sync with the song. Mancini also co-wrote two of the film's three original songs, "The World's Greatest Criminal Mind" and "Goodbye So Soon" (both performed by Vincent Price).

=== Songs ===
Original songs performed in the film include:

No.	Title	Writer(s)	Performer(s)	Length
1.	"The World's Greatest Criminal Mind"	Henry Mancini, Larry Grossman & Ellen Fitzhugh	Vincent Price
2.	"Let Me Be Good to You"	Melissa Manchester	Melissa Manchester
3.	"Goodbye So Soon"	Henry Mancini, Larry Grossman & Ellen Fitzhugh	Vincent Price

== Release ==
During the film's initial theatrical release, the film was accompanied with the 1937 short film Clock Cleaners.

The film was re-released on February 14, 1992, retitled as The Adventures of the Great Mouse Detective.

=== Home media ===
Following the theatrical re-release, the film was released on VHS and Laserdisc in July 1992 as part of the Walt Disney Classics series. It was placed into moratorium on April 30, 1993. It was released again on VHS on August 3, 1999 (with a game sheet inside it as part of a contest) and on DVD in 2002 with a short making-of featurette. In the United Kingdom, it was first released on VHS in 1992 followed by re-releases in 1993 and 1995.

A "Mystery in the Mist Edition" of The Great Mouse Detective was released on DVD on April 13, 2010, and on Blu-ray Disc on October 9, 2012. Unlike previous home media releases, which all used the 1992 reissue title print (The Adventures of the Great Mouse Detective), this DVD restored the original 1986 title card, which had previously not been seen since the original 1986 release. The DVD also has the film in its 1.78:1 widescreen aspect ratio, which brings it closer to its original theatrical aspect ratio. The Blu-ray edition is region-free and thus can be played in any region of the world. The Blu-ray was finally released in the UK on November 9, 2015, and released in France on Blu-ray on October 20, 2015.

== Reception ==
=== Critical reaction ===
On their syndicated television show, At the Movies, the film received a "two thumbs up" rating from critics Gene Siskel and Roger Ebert. In his print review for The Chicago Tribune, Siskel enthusiastically praised the film as the most "truly memorable animated feature in 25 years" that "travels a wide emotional range, taking us from cuddly to scary, from recognition to wonder." Likewise, in his print review for the Chicago Sun-Times, Ebert gave the film three stars out of four in which he praised the film's animation and compared the film to that of Disney's golden age. He summarized that "the result is a movie like The Great Mouse Detective, which looks more fully animated than anything in some 30 years."

London's Time Out magazine wrote, "As usual with film noir [...] it is the villain who steals the heart and one is rooting for in the breathtaking showdown high up in the cogs and ratchets of Big Ben." Nina Darnton of The New York Times applauded that "[t]he heroes are appealing, the villains have that special Disney flair – humorous blackguards who really enjoy being evil – and the script is witty and not overly sentimental." Johanna Steinmetz, also from The Chicago Tribune, graded the film three-and-a-half stars (out of four) writing "This movie is cute, cute, cute, but it's a higher grade of cute than The Rescuers (1977) and The Fox and the Hound (1981). The key to good Disney animation is character and facial expression, and Detective abounds in both." Alex Stewart reviewed The Great Mouse Detective for White Dwarf #83, and stated that "After their dismal fudge of The Black Cauldron, it's good to see the Disney studios taking a step, however cautious, towards the world of animation as it is today. The style is looser and more vigorous, and, in a climactic fight inside Big Ben, effectively amalgamates computer-drawn clockwork with hand-drawn characters."

The review aggregator website Rotten Tomatoes reported that the film received a 79% approval rating based on 28 reviews, with an average rating of 7.3/10. The website's consensus states that "The Great Mouse Detective may not rank with Disney's classics, but it's an amiable, entertaining picture with some stylishly dark visuals." Metacritic gave the film a score of 73 based on 13 reviews, indicating "generally favorable reviews".

Animation critic Charles Solomon listed this as one of the best animated films of the 1980s while singling out Keane's key work on Ratigan.

=== Box-office ===
The film grossed around $50 million worldwide against a budget of over $14 million during its initial release. Its inexpensive success after its predecessor's under-performance gave the new management of Disney confidence in the viability of their animation department, though it was surpassed at the box office by An American Tail. Re-titled as The Adventures of the Great Mouse Detective, the film was re-released theatrically on February 14, 1992, where it grossed $13.3 million. The Great Mouse Detective has had a lifetime North American gross of $38.7 million across its original release and reissue.

== Legacy ==
Basil and Professor Ratigan were characters to meet-and-greet at the Disney Parks, until both were retired after 2004.

In the television series Darkwing Duck, a little statue of Basil opened the secret passage to Darkwing's hidden base. Some of the characters from the film have recurring cameo appearances in the television series House of Mouse.

Professor Ratigan is one of the villains with a main focus in the anthology film Once Upon a Halloween. He is also one of the villains present in the board game Disney Villainous.

Basil of Baker Street appears as a playable character in the video game Disney Heroes: Battle Mode.

Like many other Walt Disney Animation Studios characters, the characters of the film have cameo appearances in the short film Once Upon a Studio.

Additionally, in honor of Mickey Mouse's 75th anniversary, was planned a film under the title The Search for Mickey Mouse in which Mickey gets kidnapped by unknown forces, forcing Minnie Mouse to enlist Basil of Baker Street to investigate his disappearance. However, the project was cancelled after it suffered script problems.

In 2022, Rapunzel's Tangled Adventure, Monsters at Work and Wish alumni Tom Caulfield revealed that he, Bill Motz, and Bob Roth pitched a crossover series featuring The Rescuers and The Great Mouse Detective at Disney Television Animation. The series would have featured the descendant of Basil working at a modern version of the Rescue Aid Society. According to Caulfield, the project was scrapped due the release of the Chip 'n Dale: Rescue Rangers film.

== Bibliography ==
- Hulett, Steve (2014). Mouse In Transition: An Insider's Look at Disney Feature Animation. Theme Park Press. ISBN 978-1941500248.
- Koenig, David (1997). Mouse Under Glass: Secrets of Disney Animation & Theme Parks. Irvine, California: Bonaventure Press. ISBN 978-0964060517.
- Stewart, James (2005). DisneyWar (1st ed.). New York: Simon and Schuster. ISBN 0-684-80993-1.
