= DarkMaus =

2016 role-playing video game

- Developer: Daniel Wright
- Publisher: Daniel Wright
- Engine: Microsoft XNA
- Platform: Microsoft Windows
- Release: WW: January 26, 2016
- Genre: Action role-playing
- Mode: Single-player

DarkMaus is an action role-playing video game developed by Daniel Wright. The game was released for Microsoft Windows via Steam on January 26, 2016.

== Plot ==
Dark Maus is set in the world of Hazath, which has become corrupted. It follows a lone mouse who sets out to discover what has happened.

== Gameplay ==
In Dark Maus, the combat is skill based. Weapons include swords and bows, and the player has the ability to shoot fireballs. As enemies will be much more powerful than the player, they will need to devise strategies to defeat them. The player will be punished for being greedy. When the player dies, a ghost character will appear to assist the player. Over time, the player can collect multiple ghosts, and choose which of their weapons they would like to use. The game begins with a steep difficulty curve, with the intention being for the player to be thoughtful about how to progress. There are multiple playstyles for the player to adopt, each with their own strengths and weaknesses.

== Development ==
DarkMaus' concept was inspired by the Dark Souls series. The developer kept a blog in which they detailed the development process of the game. The first entry was added on March 6, 2014. An early version was released on Steam on September 10, 2015. It was designed to be played on an Xbox controller.

== Reception ==
DarkMaus holds an aggregated Metacritic score of 83/100 based on 5 critic reviews. Hardcore Gamer awarded it a score of 4 out of 5, saying "In DarkMaus, Daniel Wright has created a focused, challenging experience that successfully translates the core tenets of Dark Souls."
