= Eve Titus =

American writer

- Born: July 16, 1922; New York City, New York, U.S.
- Died: February 4, 2002 (aged 79); Orlando, Florida, U.S.
- Resting place: Ashes spread in the Chesapeake Bay
- Other name: Nancy Lord
- Occupations: Writer, concert pianist
- Spouse: Donald Titus (divorced)
- Children: Richard (1950–2007)

Eve Titus (July 16, 1922 – February 4, 2002) was an American children's writer. She is particularly known for her books featuring the anthropomorphic mice characters Anatole, a heroic and resourceful French mouse, and Basil of Baker Street, a Victorian era mouse private detective who emulates Sherlock Holmes. Anatole later became the subject of a Canadian-produced animated television series entitled Anatole, while Basil was adapted into the 1986 Disney animated feature film The Great Mouse Detective.

Titus was a member of Mystery Writers of America and The Baker Street Irregulars.

== Books ==
Anatole

- Anatole (1956)
- Anatole and the Cat (1957)
- Anatole and the Robot (1960)
- Anatole Over Paris (1961)
- Anatole and the Poodle (1965)
- Anatole and the Piano (1966)
- Anatole and the Thirty Thieves (1969)
- Anatole and the Toy Shop (1970)
- Anatole in Italy (1973)
- Anatole and the Pied Piper (1979)

Basil of Baker Street

- Basil of Baker Street (1958)
- Basil and the Lost Colony (1964)
- Basil and the Pygmy Cats (1971)
- Basil in Mexico (1976)
- Basil in the Wild West (1982)

Other

- The Kitten Who Couldn't Purr (1960)
- Mouse and the Lion (1962)
- The Two Stonecutters (1967)
- Mr. Shaw's Shipshape Shoeshop (1970)
- Why the Wind God Wept (1972)
