= List of The Deptford Mice characters =

A list of fictional characters featured in Robin Jarvis's novel series, The Deptford Mice. Also listed are characters appearing in the prequels, The Deptford Histories and The Deptford Mouselets, as well as the sequel The Deptford Mice Almanack.

== The Deptford Mice ==
=== Audrey Brown ===
Audrey Brown (later Audrey Scuttle) is a house mouse, and the main protagonist of the books. She is the daughter of Albert and Gwen Brown, and the sister of Arthur Brown. She was born on 2 January in the empty house in Deptford inhabited by the mice.

Audrey loves dressing in lace and ribbons and especially loves a pair of silver bells which Twit the field mouse had given her. She is very headstrong but also very brave and courageous.

Audrey's story begins when she is given The Anti-Cat Charm by The Green Mouse in The Dark Portal. This leads her into the sewers where she confronts Jupiter at his altar. She throws the mousebrass at the evil cat god and he was sent to his doom.

In The Crystal Prison, she is forced by the Starwife, ruler of the squirrels in Greenwich Park, to accompany the rat Madame Akkikuyu to Fennywolde, a cornfield inhabited by Twit and many other fieldmice. After Hodge, Whortle and Jenkin are mysteriously murdered, the fieldmice begin to think that Audrey had killed them. They become convinced she is a witch and are about to hang her, but Twit invokes the Gallow's Law and marries her in order to save her, which fulfills the bat's prophecy in The Dark Portal about Twit being a "witch husband".

Audrey then returns to the Skirtings, leaving her husband behind. When the Starwife comes to the Skirtings in The Final Reckoning, she chooses Audrey to succeed her. This is a destiny that the mouse struggles against at first, tossing the Silver Acorn pendant down the cellar steps in anger.

After the Starwife dies and her body is burned in a pyre, Audrey finds a snowdrop flower in the ashes. She uses this to defeat the spirit of Jupiter once and for all.

Then, after digging through the cellar, she finds the silver acorn and takes it up to the observatory hill to become the new Starwife and reigns for ten years. However, when black squirrels arrive in Greenwich in The Deptford Mice Almanack, she is ousted from office by the mysterious squirrelmaid Morella. What became of Audrey after that is currently unknown.

Audrey's one true love was Piccadilly, whom she had a rough start with when they first met in The Dark Portal. She blames the city mouse for the death of her father, whom Piccadilly had last been with at the time of his death. Though Piccadilly eventually develops feelings for Audrey, he returns to the city, thinking that Audrey will never accept him. Over the course of The Crystal Prison, Audrey realizes that she wants nothing more than to see Piccadilly again, and was extremely despaired when she realized that she would have to marry Twit just to survive the events caused by Jupiter. When Piccadilly returns to Deptford in The Final Reckoning, Audrey admits to him that she missed him a lot, but was unable to say much else. Before Piccadilly met his untimely death, Audrey desperately tries to explain her marital situation to him, but a confused Piccadilly just brushes it off and goes out to confront Morgan and Jupiter. Audrey is overwhelmed with grief at his death, but was able to find acceptance when she was able to share a kiss with his ghost before parting ways for good.

=== Arthur Brown ===
Arthur Brown is the brother of Audrey.

=== William "Twit" Scuttle ===
William Scuttle, or Twit, is a field mouse and the cousin of Oswald Chitter. His nickname comes from the fact that many of the characters consider him to be dim-witted and a twit, but he ends up proving them wrong.

=== Oswald Chitter ===
Oswald Chitter is an albino mouse, and so is quite sickly. He is taller than the other mice, and because of this on one occasion was mistaken for a rat.

=== Piccadilly ===
Piccadilly is a grey mouse from the city who speaks with a cockney accent and has a cheeky attitude. Piccadilly's parents were killed by an Underground train when he was young and this tragedy caused him to deny the existence of the Green Mouse, preferring instead to depend upon his own sharp wits.

Many believe that it was the Green Mouse who guided Piccadilly's steps to the sewers of Deptford that fateful Spring. It was down in those dark tunnels that he met Albert Brown, and witnessed his death at the hands of Jupiter. He falls in love with Audrey sometime during his stay, though their relationship does not get anywhere as Audrey blames Piccadilly for the death of her father. When he eventually returned to Holeborn, his natural abilities earned him the office of Minister for War. When his fellow city mice are massacred in an unexpected attack from the city rats, he returns to Deptford where his relationship with Audrey develops awkwardly. Piccadilly later dies in a battle against a ghostly Jupiter much to Audrey's horror. At the conclusion of The Final Reckoning, a ghostly Piccadilly is able to share a kiss with Audrey moving on, admitting that he has always loved her.

=== Albert Brown ===
Albert Brown is the husband of Gwen Brown and the father of Arthur and Audrey.

In the beginning of The Dark Portal, Albert succumbs to the magical powers of the Grille in the basement of the empty house in Deptford and wanders into the sewers. Frightened and alone, he remembers that the Great Spring Festival is approaching; this year his son and daughter will receive their mousebrasses, and he will probably miss it.

Trying to find his way out of the sewers, Albert stumbles across Piccadilly, a young grey mouse from the city, and the two quickly become friends. The two soon come upon a large chamber in which is a portal with a candle on each side. They both realise that this is the altar of Jupiter. As they listen, Jupiter's lieutenant, Morgan, is discussing something with the being in the darkness.

Albert decides to go closer so he can hear the conversation more clearly, ignoring Piccadilly's protests. Albert is quickly caught by Morgan, and Jupiter orders his lieutenant to give the mouse to him so he can peel him himself.

After telling Piccadilly to run, Albert also tosses his mousebrass at him, instructing him to give it to "Gwennie."

When Piccadilly meets Audrey and tells her what happened, she becomes angry with him and doesn't want to believe that her father is dead. But after Jupiter is defeated, the spirit of Albert appears to her, and she finally accepts his death.

In the end of The Final Reckoning, Albert's ghost appears once more to Audrey, telling her that he loves her, her brother and her mother, and that he understands the affection that is growing between Gwen and Thomas Triton and wishes them joy. Then he leads the ghost of Piccadilly to the other side.

=== Gwen Brown ===
Gwen Brown is the wife of Albert Brown and the mother of Arthur and Audrey.

=== Thomas Triton ===
Thomas Triton, referred to as a midshipmouse, lives on the Cutty Sark in Greenwich. He has sailed across the world, but is now retired, though he is still haunted by a mysterious event that happened in his past.

=== The Starwife ===
The Starwife is the ancient leader of the squirrels in Greenwich Park, who lives in a chamber underneath an oak tree. She wears a silver acorn pendant and possesses a shiny black disc known as the Starglass, with which she can see into the future. She has good intentions though she can seem cruel, as she is not above using threats and trickery to accomplish certain tasks. In The Final Reckoning, she reveals to Audrey that she is a black squirrel, a nearly extinct race of squirrels. As she is aging fast and unable to find a black squirrel successor, she tricks Audrey into taking her place as the next Starwife, who eventually accepts the position after the fall of Jupiter.

=== Jupiter ===
Jupiter is the mysterious god of the rats who live in the sewers of London in The Dark Portal.

Audrey Brown confronts him at the end of the novel and finds that he is a monstrous cat. She throws her mousebrass at him and he falls into and is drowned in the sewer water. When his body washes up on the shore near the River Thames, it is tossed into a fire and burned.

After this, in The Crystal Prison, Jupiter's ghost speaks through a tattoo on the fortune-teller Madame Akkikuyu's ear, claiming that he was Nicodemus, a spirit trapped in limbo. When the rat agrees to help him, it is revealed that Jupiter wants to take over her body since his was destroyed. Akkikuyu kills herself before this happens.

Unfortunately, this enables the spirit of Jupiter to return. When Alison Sedge breaks Akkikuyu's crystal ball, Jupiter is free. In the final book of the trilogy, The Final Reckoning, he smothers the world in an eternal winter. He steals the Starwife's Starglass, and uses this to remove the stars from the sky. Before he can do anything else, however, Audrey confronts him once more. She throws a snowdrop flower into his mouth, and this condemns him to the doom of life throughout eternity. Jupiter's backstory was revealed in The Alchymist's Cat, where it is revealed that his real name is Leech, a runty black kitten who resented his brother, the real Jupiter, eventually murdering him and usurping his power before journeying to the sewers.

=== Morgan ===
Morgan is Jupiter's lieutenant, a piebald Cornish rat.

=== Madame Akkikuyu ===
Madame Akkikuyu is a black rat from Morocco who poses as a fortune teller, though she has no real magical powers until she deals with Jupiter, who gives her magical abilities. She is the only non-evil rat in the trilogy.

=== Orfeo and Eldritch ===
Orfeo and Eldritch are two bat brothers who can see into the future.

=== Alison Sedge ===
Alison Sedge is a field mouse who appears in The Crystal Prison. When she received her Sign of Grace and Beauty mousebrass in the summer before the events of the novel, she began teasing boys and took great care of her appearance.

But despite the fact that she and Jenkin Nettle grew apart for this very reason, it is clear that she still loves him.

When Audrey Brown comes to Fennywolde, Alison becomes very jealous because Jenkin seems to take a liking to her. After Jenkin is killed by Mahooot the owl, Alison blames Audrey for what had happened. Even after she realizes that the spirit of Jupiter is behind everything, she still hates Audrey.

Ever hurt over the death of Jenkin, Alison goes mad and stops taking care of herself. Her appearance becomes so frightful that some even consider her a witch.

When the strange black squirrel Morella arrives in Greenwich in The Deptford Mice Almanack, it is noted that she looks very much like the young Alison. The connection between the two has not been revealed yet.

=== Jenkin Nettle ===
Jenkin Nettle is a field mouse who appears in The Crystal Prison, and is the son of Isaac Nettle.

Jenkin's father acts very cruel to him, giving the young mouse beatings if he does something Isaac finds unacceptable. Deep down, Isaac does love his son, but always blames him for the death of his wife Meg who died giving birth to Jenkin.

Once, Jenkin had been in love with Alison Sedge, but after she received her Sign of Grace and Beauty their relationship ended because she had become vain.

When Audrey Brown visits the field, Jenkin is immediately attracted to her. One night he gets her out of bed and tells her he was planning to build a nest around The Hall of Corn and he wants to share it with her. He proposes to her but she turns him down, saying that she knows that he and Alison are meant to be together.

Soon after this, though, Jenkin and Audrey are chased out of the field by the now evil, animate corn doll. However, when they reach the edge of the field, the corn doll stops chasing them. At first they think they are out of danger, until Mahooot the owl picks Jenkin up in his talons, carrying him into the sky.

Sadly, Jenkin is killed and eaten by Mahooot, and Isaac discovers the owl pellet containing his son's mousebrass soon after.

=== Marty ===
Marty is a friend of Piccadilly's. He lives in the mouse community of Holeborn in the city, and has an unusual zigzag pattern of fur on his back.

=== Barker ===
Barker is a seemingly crazy old rat whom Piccadilly befriends. It's revealed that his craziness is just a front, and that he has an unknown past with the Starwife, which was briefly touched upon in the Final Reckoning.

=== The Green Mouse ===
The Green Mouse is a magical figure in woodland mythology. He is the essence of all growing things whose power is at its height in the summertime.

== The Deptford Histories ==
=== William Godwin ===
William Godwin, or Will, is a young boy who is one of the main characters in The Alchymist's Cat, the first book in The Deptford Histories, set in London in the 1660s. He is left an orphan after his father dies and heads to London to claim his inheritance. However once there he is attacked by two thieves and happens upon finding shelter in Spittle's alchemist shop. He is then promptly made his assistant and sent to do his every bidding. On one of his tasks he comes across a cat and her kittens and brings them back to the shop. Eventually he discovers the truth as to why he was kidnapped by Spittle and escapes him leaving the burning capital behind carrying the last kitten that survived.

=== Elias Theophrastus Spittle ===
Elias Theophrastus Spittle is an evil alchemist who forces Will to become his assistant and slave. Unbeknownst to Will Spittle is actually his uncle who is intent on claiming his inheritance from his dead father. Towards the end of the book Spittle tries to murder Will.

=== Jupiter ===
Jupiter is the title character of The Alchymist's Cat. He is a striped ginger-coloured kitten whom Dr. Spittle makes his familiar.

=== Leech ===
Leech is the jealous brother of Jupiter. At the end of the book, it turns out that he, rather than his brother, is the villain Jupiter in the main Deptford Mice books.

=== Dab ===
Dab is the gentle, tortoiseshell-coloured sister of Jupiter and Leech, who hates to see the two fight. She is later dissected by Elias Spittle in the Alchemist's Cat.

=== Imelza ===
Imelza is the mother of the three kittens Jupiter, Dab and Leech.

=== Ysabelle ===
Ysabelle is the young squirrel maiden protagonist of The Oaken Throne. She goes on a journey to become the Starwife in the story, which is set in the Middle Ages.

=== Vespertilio ===
Vespertilio is a young bat in The Oaken Throne. He wants to become a warrior like his late father and fight the squirrels, the enemies of the bats. He later meets Ysabelle and, at first very reluctantly, accompanies her in her traveling. He falls in love with her during their travels, but ultimately dies before Ysabelle can return the feelings.

=== Giraldus ===
Giraldus is a leprous mole who becomes one of Ysabelle's traveling companions.

=== Tysle Symkim ===
Tysle Symkim is Giraldus's friend and guide, a shrew with a lame leg.

=== Wendel Maculatum ===
Wendel Maculatum is a stoat jester who befriends Ysabelle.

=== Lady Ninnia ===
Lady Ninnia is the Queen of the Hazel Realm and the mother of Ysabelle.

=== Lord Cyllinus ===
Lord Cyllinus is the father of Ysabelle and the consort of Ninnia.

=== Morwenna ===
Morwenna is an evil squirrel who betrayed the realm of Greenreach. She is the priestess of Mabb.

=== Rohgar ===
Rohgar is the bat army's most celebrated general.

=== Fenlyn Purfote ===
Fenlyn Purfote is the field mouse captain who founded Fennywolde.

=== The Ancient ===
The Ancient is the messenger of the moon goddess, who came to Earth in the form of a hare.

=== Woodget Pipple ===
Woodget Pipple is the field mouse friend of Thomas Stubbs (later known as Thomas Triton), who appears in Thomas.

=== Simoon ===
Simoon is a jerboa prophet.

=== Mulligan ===
Mulligan is a mouse sailor who befriends Thomas and Woodget on their trip on the Calliope.

=== Dahrem Ruhar ===
Dahrem Ruhar is an evil adept of the serpent god Sarpedon, who gains the trust of Thomas, Woodget and Mulligan disguised as a mouse named Dimmy.

=== Chattan Giri ===
Chattan Giri is a mongoose captain in the city of Hara, located in India.

=== Sobhan Giri ===
Sobhan Giri is Chattan's sister.

=== Karim Bihari ===
A mongoose warrior of Hara and a friend of Chattan's.

=== Sadhu ===
The Sadhu of Hara is an ancient lorus.

=== High Priest of Sarpedon ===
A sable is the evil High Priest of Sarpedon.

== The Deptford Mouselets ==
=== Fleabee ===
Fleabee is a young female rat who appears in Fleabee's Fortune. She is gentle and kind, unlike the other rats who live in the sewers of London.

=== Scabmona ===
Scabmona is Fleabee's little sister, and unlike her in every way.

=== Klakkweena ===
Klakkweena is Fleabee's mother, the wife of Rancid Alf and the daughter of Black Ratchet.

=== Rancid Alf ===
Rancid Alf is Fleabee's father, the husband of Klakkweena.

=== Lickit ===
Lickit is a rat boy around the age of Fleabee.

=== Muff ===
Muff is a hamster who is the head of a circus act.

=== Tilik and Vasili ===
Tilik and Vasili are gerbils from Mongolia who are a part of Muff's act.

=== Ambrose ===
Ambrose is one of the Starwife's squirrel sentries.

=== Whortle Nep ===
Whortle Nep first appears in The Crystal Prison, but is the main character in Whortle's Hope, which takes place the summer before the events of the former.

=== Willibald, Woppenfrake and Firgild ===
Willibald, Woppenfrake and Firgild are three magical watervole brothers who appear in Whortle's Hope.

=== Virianna ===
Virianna is the mother of Willibald, Woppenfrake and Firgild and the priestess of the Green who lived during the time of Fenlyn Purfote.

=== Ogmund ===
Ogmund is the nephew of the bat brothers Orfeo and Eldritch, who appears in Ogmund's Gift.

== The Deptford Mice Almanack ==
=== Gervase Brightkin ===
Gervase Brightkin is a red squirrel who travels to Greenwich Park ten years after the events of The Final Reckoning. He is a writer and an artist, and The Deptford Mice Almanack is written as though he is its author.

=== Morella ===
Morella is a mysterious black squirrel maiden who comes to Greenwich with her father Modequai ten years after the events of The Final Reckoning. Her appearance is quite a shock, as black squirrels were thought to be a dead race. It is rumoured that she and her father are the last surviving members of the Hawthorn Realm, one of the five royal houses of black squirrels.

Soon after her arrival, Morella's father barges into Audrey Scuttle's chamber and takes the silver acorn from her neck. Then Morella becomes the new Starwife as the 'Usurping Mouse'is chased away. Strangely, Morella greatly resembles the field mouse Alison Sedge, though the significance of this has never fully been revealed.

=== Modequai ===
Modequai is the father of Morella.

=== Pirkin Gim Gim ===
Pirkin Gim Gim is a hedgehog and a friend of Gervase Brightkin, though he considers him to be more of a nuisance.

=== Dodder ===
Dodder is a harmless old rat whom Gervase Brightkin talks to in order to learn of the traditions of the rat folk.

=== Dilly-O ===
Dilly-O is the son of Arthur Brown and Nel Poot, named after Piccadilly.

=== Waldo ===
Waldo is the brother of Dilly-O, named after Oswald Chitter.

=== Sorrel ===
Sorrel is the sister of Dilly-O and Waldo.
