= List of fictional rodents in literature =

This list of fictional rodents in literature is subsidiary to the list of fictional animals and covers all rodents appearing in printed works of literature including beavers, chipmunks, gophers, guinea pigs, hamsters, marmots, prairie dogs, and porcupines plus the extinct prehistoric species (such as Rugosodon).

== Squirrels ==
This section exclusively lists all squirrels (flying, red, grey, sazzys, and otherwise).

Character/s	Author	Work	Notes
Urchin	M. I. McAllister	The Mistmantle Chronicles	A red squirrel with peculiar coloring.
Bannertail	Ernest Thompson Seton	Bannertail: The Story of a Graysquirrel	A Western gray squirrel. Orphaned as a baby, he was taken in and raised by a cat. Adapted into an anime series.
Felldoh	Brian Jacques	Martin the Warrior	A young red squirrel.
Jess Squirrel	Brian Jacques	Redwall & Mattimeo	A red squirrel who is an excellent climber.
Morwenna	Robin Jarvis	The Oaken Throne	An evil black squirrel who betrayed the Starwife, queen of the squirrels, and allowed enemies to attack the realm of Greenreach.
Perri	Felix Salten	Perri	A female red squirrel who lives in the forest.
Ranguvar Foeseeker	Brian Jacques	The Legend of Luke	A female black squirrel who is a berserker.
Rufe Brush	Brian Jacques	Mariel of Redwall & The Bellmaker	A young red squirrel who is somewhat taciturn, but proves to be a hero.
Ruro	Brian Jacques	Lord Brocktree	A female squirrel who is part of a tribe that speaks using archaic words.
Russa Nodrey	Brian Jacques	The Long Patrol	A nomadic female red squirrel.
Samkim	Brian Jacques	Salamandastron	A young squirrel who is fond of archery. He goes on a quest to recover a legendary sword that has been stolen from the abbey where he lives.
Miss Suzy Squirrel	Miriam Young	Miss Suzy	A brown squirrel who loves to cook and clean. She is evicted by a gang of red squirrels but her newfound friends eventually help her out.
Sarobando	Brian Jacques	Loamhedge	An older female squirrel who travels with her otter friend Bragoon.
Scaredy Squirrel	Mélanie Watt	Scaredy Squirrel	Scaredy is inevitably faced with the fears he tries so hard to avoid, eventually learning that it is not as bad as he initially imagined. However, he only slightly alters his strict daily routines after these experiences. Adapted into a TV series.
The Starwife	Robin Jarvis	The Deptford Mice	An ancient and wise black squirrel who wields celestial magic and reigns over a colony of squirrels in Greenwich Park.
Squirrel	Pat Miller	Squirrel's New Year's Resolution	A young squirrel who finds out about New Year's resolution.
Squirrel Nutkin	Beatrix Potter	The Tale of Squirrel Nutkin	A red squirrel, who gets on others nerves and goes too far when he annoys Old Brown almost getting killed.
Timmy Tiptoes	Beatrix Potter	The Tale of Timmy Tiptoes	A grey squirrel, who gets into a bad situation when he is wrongly accused of stealing and hoarding the wood's nuts.
Ysabelle	Robin Jarvis	The Oaken Throne	A black squirrel princess who must embark on a dangerous journey to claim the throne.

== Mice ==
Character/s	Author	Work	Notes
Albert	Eleanor May	Mouse Math series	A playful mouse who spends time with his sister Wanda.
Algernon	Daniel Keyes	Flowers for Algernon	A laboratory mouse who has undergone surgery to increase his intelligence by artificial means.
Amos	William Steig	Amos and Boris	An adventurous mouse who loves the sea and becomes friends with a whale named Boris.
Anatole	Eve Titus	Anatole (1956)	A mouse who lives in a mouse village outside Paris and is determined to prove humans wrong in regarding mice as villainous.
Angelina Mouseling	Katharine Holabird	Angelina Ballerina	A young ballet dancer who has many great times and sometimes mishaps with her best friend Alice.
Arthur and Humphrey	Graham Oakley	The Church Mice series	The two mice are the protagonists, along with Sampson the cat, in the series, which take place in and around a church in the fictional town of Whortlethope, England.
Audrey Brown	Robin Jarvis	The Deptford Mice	A mouse girl whose search for her missing father leads her into the sewers where she must defeat an evil rat god.
Basil of Baker Street	Eve Titus	Basil of Baker Street	A private detective mouse who lives in Sherlock Holmes's cellar.
Bernard and Deborah De Soto	William Steig	Doctor De Soto	Professional dentists. Being mice, they refuse to treat animals dangerous to mice, with the exception of a suffering fox.
Bianca and Bernard	Margery Sharp	The Rescuers	Members of the 'Mouse Prisoner's Aid Society' assigned to rescue and cheer up poor imprisoned people in distress.
Big Bad Mouse	Julia Donaldson	The Gruffalo	A cunning mouse who scares away all his predators with a made-up story about the Gruffalo but then finds the monster is real.
Charles	Tim Davis	Mice of the Herring Bone, Mice of the Nine Lives, Mice of the Seven Seas, Mice of the Westing Wind - Book 1, Mice of the Westing Wind - Book 2	With his friend, Oliver, Charles joins a feline navy ship to save Her Majesty's treasure from a band of sea dogs.
Christopher	William Wise	Christopher Mouse: The Tale of a Small Traveler	A domesticated mouse, who becomes an intrepid explorer, braving danger along the way.
The Cranston Family	Richard Peck	Secrets at Sea	Made out of Helena, Louise, Beatrice, Lamont, and their later parents and sisters Vicky and Alice.
Despereaux Tilling	Kate DiCamillo	The Tale of Despereaux	A castle-mouse and the only living mouse of his mother's last litter. Named for the despairs and sadnesses of that time, Despereaux is an oddball among the mouse community from birth, as he is born with a small body, huge ears, and open eyes.
Frankie and Benjy	Douglas Adams	Hitchhikers' Guide to the Galaxy	Two members of the species which had ordered the Magratheans to construct planet Earth
Geronimo Stilton	Edizioni Piemme	Lost Treasure of the Emerald Eye	A nervous, mild-mannered mouse who would like nothing better than to live a quiet life, but he keeps getting involved in far-away adventures with his relatives.
Hopper	Lisa Fiedler	Mouseheart	Former pet store mouse who escapes into Brooklyn’s tunnel system
Hunca Munca & Tom Thumb	Beatrix Potter	The Tale of Two Bad Mice	They both destroy a doll's house finding the food is inedible. But after a change of heart they fix the damage.
Jensen	Jane Breskin Zalben	Mousterpiece	An art-loving mouse who proceeds to fill an empty museum exhibit with her own abstract art.
Johnny Town-Mouse and Timmy Willie	Beatrix Potter	The Tale of Johnny Town-Mouse	Johnny lives in town which proves to be too scary and too much for Timmy, while Timmy lives in the country which is too quiet and full of sudden surprises for Johnny.
Martin the Warrior	Brian Jacques	Mossflower, Martin the Warrior, & The Legend of Luke	Martin, a young mouse, is the son of a warrior. In Martin the Warrior, Martin manages to escape from slavery at the hands of Badrang the Tyrant, and then returns to take back his father's stolen sword and put an end to Badrang forever. Martin's further adventures are chronicled in the other two books.
Mary Mouse	Enid Blyton	Mary Mouse	A mouse exiled from her mousehole and becomes a maid at the dolls' house, employed by Sailor Doll.
Matthias	Brian Jacques	Redwall & Mattimeo	A young, clumsy mouse who eventually becomes a great warrior and defeats the evil rat Cluny the Scourge.
Max	Hanne Türk	Max the Mouse series	A grey mouse, who has many domestic adventures, often with his beloved cat-tiger toy. He was created in 1982. The book series were then adapted into a German TV Series in 1987 titled "Philipp die Maus" plus an up-to-date magazine series.
Milo	Marcus Pfister	Milo and the Magical Stones	A mischievous little mouse, who discovers a magic glowing stone which starts up a hunt for more of these stones.
Mus	Paul Kidd	Mus of Kerbridge	A mouse made intelligent by a brutal spell and becomes adventurous on a quest in Kerbridge.
Maddie	Judith Moria Grace Butterfield	Mouse in the Penthouse	A young shy and timid mouse who travels to portals which lands her in Hollywood as a film director.
Maisy	Lucy Cousins	Maisy (book series)	The main character of the book series by Lucy Cousins, Maisy also featured in the TV series based on the book series. Maisy is a white mouse who lives in an orange house with a red roof.
Mrs. Frisby	Robert C. O'Brien	Mrs. Frisby and the Rats of NIMH	A widowed field mouse who seeks the aid of a group of former laboratory rats in rescuing her home from destruction by a farmer's plow.
Mouse	Arnold Lobel	Mouse Soup	A brown mouse, very into literature who manages to trick his way out of Weasel's soup pot by telling him stories as a part of his Mouse Soup recipe.
Mr. Jingles	Stephen King	The Green Mile	A mouse whom Del teaches various tricks.
Miggs Family	Miriam Norton	The Kitten Who Thought He Was A Mouse	The family consists of the mother, father, Lester and his two sisters. They then adopt and raise an abandoned kitten Lester named Mickey.
The Mouse King	E.T.A. Hoffmann	"The Nutcracker and the Mouse King"	The seven-headed mouse king who leads his mouse army in an epic battle against the Nutcracker and the toys.
Nora	Rosemary Wells	Noisy Nora	The middle child of her family, who makes noise to get some attention.
Oliver	Tim Davis	Mice of the Herring Bone, Mice of the Nine Lives, Mice of the Seven Seas, Mice of the Westing Wind - Book 1, Mice of the Westing Wind - Book 2	A reluctant hero, Oliver uses his common sense to defeat a band of scurvy sea dogs.
Ralph	Beverly Cleary	The Mouse and the Motorcycle	A mouse who lives in the run-down Mountain View Inn, and takes interest in a boy's toy motorcycle.
Reepicheep	C. S. Lewis	Chronicles of Narnia	A brave and gallant mouse.
Ricky Ricotta	Dav Pilkey	Ricky Ricotta's Mighty Robot series	The eponymous protagonist, who befriends a robot made by Dr. Stink McNasty.
Sam	Daniel Kirk	Library Mouse	A mouse who loves reading and is inspired to write his own books.
Santa Mouse	Michael Brown	Santa Mouse	Becomes Santa's little helper on Christmas Eve.
Sheila Rae	Kevin Henkes	Sheila Rae, the Brave	A fearless but reckless sort who brags on about her bravery until her little sister Louise gets the better of her.
Snips	A. J. Macgregor	The Story of Snips - A Very Naughty Mouse	A mischievous mouse who is prone to getting in trouble and runs away to seek a better life.
Dr. Stinky McNasty	Dav Pilkey	Ricky Ricotta's Mighty Robot	The book's main antagonist. He creates the titular robot in order to destroy the city of Squeakyville, but it refuses to obey his commands.
Stuart Little	E. B. White	Stuart Little	A white mouse adopted by the Little family in New York City.
Tailoring Mice	Beatrix Potter	The Tailor of Gloucester	They live in tunnels between the tailor's workshop and house. After he rescues them from Simkins, they repay him by finishing a wedding coat while he is ill in bed.
Mrs. Tittlemouse	Beatrix Potter	The Tale of Mrs. Tittlemouse	A terribly tidy mouse who doesn't like even specks of dirty feet in her house.
Vera	Marjolein Bastin	Vera the Mouse	A sweet and feminine Dutch country mouse

== Rats ==
This section exclusively lists all rats (domestic, barn, wharf and pack rats alike).

Character/s	Author	Work	Notes
Ben	Stephen Gilbert	Ratman's Notebooks	A menacing rat featured in this 1968 horror novel; also appears in the film adaptation Willard, the 2003 remake Willard, and the sequel Ben.
Dangerous Beans	Terry Pratchett	The Amazing Maurice and his Educated Rodents	A near-blind albino rat with a guru-like guidance to the rats and the only one who can withstand Spider's mind control.
Death of Rats	Terry Pratchett	Hogfather	A rodent version of Death, who came into being when Death disappears during Reaper Man. Instead of a human skeleton, Death of Rats possesses a rodent skeleton.
King Rat	China Miéville	King Rat	Fallen king of the rats, father of Saul, and locked into a centuries long feud with the Piper.
Lariska	Eduard Uspenskiy	Cheburashka	The Old Lady Shapoklyak's pet rat, whom she keeps in her purse.
Malcolm	W. H. Beck	Malcom at Midnight	A class pet rat, who is prejudiced as a menace by the Midnight Academy until he proves them wrong by saving a kidnapped Iguana.
Melchisedec	Frances Hodgeson Burnett	A Little Princess	A domestic rat whom Sara Crewe befriends during her time as a servant at Miss Minchin's Seminary; she calls him "a Bastille rat sent to be my friend".
Nicodemus	Robert C. O'Brien	Mrs. Frisby and the Rats of NIMH	Leader of the rats of NIMH.
Oprah	Jay Black	Guttersnipe	Oversized yet elusive wharf rat and nemesis of antiheroic protagonist, exterminator John Richter.
Professor Ratigan	Eve Titus	Basil of Baker Street	Basil's archenemy and a master criminal.
Ratine	Jules Verne	Adventures of the Rat Family	Heroine of the rat family, who sets to undo the evil magician Gardafour's wicked spells.
Ratty	Lynne Jonell	Emmy and the Rat series	Emmy's closest friend, who comforts the girl at stressful times and has amazing powers.
Ripred	Suzanne Collins	The Underland Chronicles	Main character, giant rat (gnawer), leader of the rat resistance
Samuel Whiskers & Anna Maria	Beatrix Potter	The Tale of Samuel Whiskers or The Roly-Poly Pudding	A rat couple who try to make Tom Kitten into a pudding until they are driven away by John Joiner.
Scabbers	J.K. Rowling	Harry Potter series	Ron Weasley's pet rat.
Scrabble	Louisa May Alcott	Little Women	Pet rat of the March sisters.
Socrates	Stephen Gilbert	Ratman's Notebooks	A white rat who is befriended, and used for evil, in this 1968 horror novel; also appears in the film adaptation Willard and the 2003 remake Willard.
Surfer	Paul Zindel	Rats	A white pet of Sarah and Michael McGraw who becomes the leader of the mutant rats and introduces them to music and dance.
Templeton	E. B. White	Charlotte's Web	A barnyard rat who unwillingly helps Wilbur and cares more about eating things.
Walter	Barbara Wersba	Walter: The Story of a Rat	A literate rat who tries to get to know Miss Pomeroy who shares a lot in common with him.
Whisker	Cameron Stelzer	Pie Rats: The Forgotten Map	A circus rat, originally named Wentworth Winterbottom, who becomes a Pie Rat and a member of Captain Black Rat's crew aboard the Apple Pie and is renamed Whisker.
The Other Mr Bobo	Neil Gaiman	Coraline	A cluster of rats brought together to create a copy of Mr Bobo.

== Other ==
Character/s	Species	Author	Work	Notes
Mr. and Mrs. Beaver	Beaver	C. S. Lewis	The Lion, the Witch and the Wardrobe	Beaver couple who assist the Pevensie children in Narnia.
Chilawee and Chikanee	Beaver	Grey Owl	The Adventures of Sajo and her Beaver People	Two young beavers, Chilawee and Chikanee, adopted by Sajo, an Ojibwe First Nations girl.
Chip Chip	Chipmunk	Norman Wright	Chip Chip	An adventurous chipmunk who would rather play than go to school. Illustrations by Nino Carbe
Chippy Hackee	Chipmunk	Beatrix Potter	The Tale of Timmy Tiptoes	Timmy Tiptoes' saviour in the nut theft riot.
Dormouse	Dormouse	Lewis Carroll	Alice's Adventures in Wonderland	Spends most of his time sleeping and occasionally cutting in conversations without paying attention.
Ereth	Porcupine	Avi	Poppy	A porcupine who is the best friend of the deer mouse Poppy.
Olga da Polga	Guinea pig	Michael Bond	The Tales of Olga da Polga series	Olga was named after the Bond family's real guinea pig.
Paddy the Beaver	Beaver	Thornton Burgess	The Adventures of Paddy the Beaver	An industrious beaver who builds a dam, a lodge, and a canal in the Green Forest.
Poppy	Peromyscus	Avi	Poppy	A deer mouse who loves dancing. She shows bravery when she takes it upon herself to find out the truth behind Ocax and save her family.
Porcupine	Porcupine	Meg Tilly	Porcupine	An unnamed porcupine represents the tough outside and kind heart of the narrator, Jacqueline, who faces difficult times when her father dies and her mother abandons her and her two younger siblings. In the final scene, she meets and feeds the wild porcupine.
Ratty	European water vole	Kenneth Grahame	The Wind in the Willows	A generous and understanding good friend of Mole, but has many doubts about Mr. Toad.
Sulu	Hamster	Dav Pilkey	Captain Underpants	Melvin Sneedly's pet hamster whom he combined with a bionic robot. He is later adopted by George and Harold.
Humphrey	Hamster	Betty G. Birney	Humphrey series	Humphrey, the narrator, is a smart hamster who, unbeknownst to those he meets and befriends, learns from the world around him, just outside his cage.
