= The Deptford Mice Almanack =

- First edition cover
- Author: Robin Jarvis
- Illustrator: Robin Jarvis
- Language: English
- Series: The Deptford Mice
- Genre: Dark fantasy
- Publisher: Macdonald Young Books
- Publication date: 1997
- Publication place: United Kingdom
- Media type: Print (Hardcover)
- ISBN: 0-7500-2101-2
- OCLC: 59587220
- Preceded by: Thomas
- Followed by: Fleabee's Fortune

The Deptford Mice Almanack is a companion book to The Deptford Mice and Deptford Histories trilogies by Robin Jarvis, presented in an in-universe style. It was first published in 1997 by Macdonald Young Books in the United Kingdom.

== Synopsis ==
Ten years after the events of The Final Reckoning, a red squirrel artist and writer named Gervase Brightkin is staying as a guest of mouse heroine Audrey Scuttle, now the Starwife in Greenwich Park. He is commanded by her to create an almanack to record the lore and traditions of the mice, squirrels, bats, and rats. There are entries for all the days of the year, and every major event in the main novels is given a date. Gervase includes journal entries throughout telling of his stay in Greenwich as well as his travels to Fennywolde and Holeborn to ask William 'Twit' Scuttle and Arthur Brown to tell their stories.

While in Fennywolde, Gervase encounters Alison Sedge, the field mouse who was jealous of Audrey in The Crystal Prison. She was seemingly driven mad because of the death of her love interest, Jenkin Nettle, for which she blames Audrey. Alison solemnly warns that Audrey will not be the Starwife for much longer and will know great loss. At the end of the year, the Great Oak (in which the evil rat god Hobb was imprisoned by a previous Starwife, Ysabelle) falls down because of heavy winds. It is seen as an ill omen, and many of the grey squirrels in the park begin to whisper that it was Audrey's fault because she is not a squirrel but "merely" a mouse. Traditionally, the office of Starwife was always held by a squirrel.

When two black squirrels, Morella and her father Modequai, arrive in Greenwich, everyone is shocked as that monarchical race was thought to be extinct. The grey squirrels see Morella as the perfect replacement for Audrey, and ultimately there is a revolt. Audrey is ousted from office, her silver acorn pendant is given to Morella, and the latter takes the title of Starwife. However, it is heavily implied that Morella is not what she seems. The almanack ends on this ominous note, setting the stage for a future Deptford Mice novel to resolve the cliffhanger.
