= Twit =

Twit may refer to:

- TWiT.tv, a podcast network
- This Week in Tech, a podcast on the TWiT.tv network
- The Twits, a children's book by Roald Dahl
- The Twits (film), a 2025 film based on the Roald Dahl book
- The Twits (album), a 2023 album by Bar Italia
- "Twit" (song), a 2019 song by Hwasa
- William "Twit" Scuttle, a fictional character; in the List of The Deptford Mice characters

== See also ==
- Upper Class Twit of the Year, a comedy sketch by Monty Python
- Twitter
- Tweet (disambiguation)
