= Whortle's Hope =

- Author: Robin Jarvis
- Language: English
- Series: The Deptford Mouselets
- Genre: Dark fantasy
- Publisher: Hodder Headline
- Publication date: 1 November 2007
- Publication place: United Kingdom
- Media type: Print (paperback)
- Pages: 378
- ISBN: 0-340-85512-6
- OCLC: 191889137
- Preceded by: Fleabee's Fortune
- Followed by: Ogmund's Gift

Whortle's Hope is a dark fantasy novel for children by British author Robin Jarvis. It is the second book in The Deptford Mouselets series, prequels to Jarvis's Deptford Mice trilogy aimed at a slightly younger audience. It was first published in the United Kingdom in 2007. The story focuses on Whortle Nep, a fieldmouse who was a minor character in The Crystal Prison, and is set a year prior to that book's events.

== Synopsis ==
In the story, which takes place in the summer before the events of The Crystal Prison, it is almost the time of the Fennywolde games, when the young field mice compete to see who will have the honour of being the head sentry of the cornfield for the entire summer. Young Whortle longs to win the competition, but not if it means his friends are going to sabotage the other competitor's chances. He wants to win on his own merits, but soon realises winning isn't the most important thing as another mouse needs the prize more than he does.

== Reception ==
John Lloyd of The Bookbag gave Whortle's Hope a five star review, calling it "an essential addition to the bookshelves of anybody who has read Robin Jarvis before, and despite filling in blanks elsewhere in the series for fans, it really works as an initial launch into the rest."
