= Final Reckoning =

Final Reckoning may refer to:

- A Final Reckoning, a 1928 film
- The Final Reckoning, a 1990 novel
- Mission: Impossible – The Final Reckoning, a 2025 film
