= The Power of Dark =

THE POWER OF DARK
- Author: Robin Jarvis
- Language: English
- Genre: Children
- Publisher: Egmont Publishing
- Publication date: 30 June 2016
- Publication place: United Kingdom
- Media type: Print
- Pages: 288
- ISBN: 9781405280235

The Power of Dark is the first in a series by children's author Robin Jarvis known as The Witching Legacy. The series returns to the coastal town of Whitby, the setting of Jarvis' supernatural children's fantasy trilogy, The Whitby Witches. The series will consist of four novels. The Power of Dark was first published in June 2016. The second novel, The Devil's Paintbox, was published in March 2017. A third volume, Time of Blood, is expected to be published later in 2017.

== Plot ==
Whitby is a coastal town in Yorkshire, which has many gothic associations, not least Dracula. Cherry Cerise is the last of the Whitby Witches and it is left to her to defend the town from supernatural attacks. Best friends Lil and Verne have grown up in Whitby where Lil's parents keep the local witchcraft shop, Whitby Gothic, but they are sceptical about the existence of witches.

When a terrible storm threatens the town, Cherry is convinced that ancient evil forces are at work. The legend goes that the Nimius was created by magician Melchior Pyke, with the assistance of a young witch known as Scaur Annie. But they were both betrayed by Pyke's villainous manservant, Mister Dark, causing a feud that has survived even beyond death.

Now Mister Dark is back with a malevolent plan to destroy Whitby. Cherry cannot stop him alone and must enlist the help of Lil and Verne who do not even believe in magic.

== Inspiration ==
Robin Jarvis has long been drawn to the coastal town of Whitby for its historic and Gothic associations and he decided to revisit it for another supernatural series, 'I've felt the lure to return to those narrow cobbled streets on the East Cliff, climb the 199 steps up to the gale beaten graveyard and look back over the town. Whitby is a place that won't let you go and strange, unearthly stories are waiting to be scratched out of the sand and soil.' He was also keen to explore how Whitby had changed in the intervening years and was particularly interested in the expansion of the Goth culture. Whitby has become a place of pilgrimage for Goths, and the book explores the economic and cultural influence through Lil's parents' shop, Whitby Gothic, and references Whitby's popular Goth Weekend.

== Reception ==
Review coverage has been positive with readers delighted by Jarvis' return to his former setting of Whitby. A reviewer for The Bookbag said, "this is an entertaining and imaginative story, and I look forward to the sequels". The Strange Alliances blog said, "Expect a highly imaginative story (bizarre inventions meet old magical entities) with terrific atmosphere (Whitby at its most storm lashed) scary bits (anything to do with Mr Dark) and lots of and great characters (the flamboyant witch Cherry Cerise)," while the Books for Keeps newsletter said, "The characters really come alive and you build a connection to them and what they are going through in this fast paced, exciting and at times very dark tale of magic and murder." The Power of Dark was also selected for Amazon's summer reading list.
