= Thomas (Jarvis novel) =

1995 novel by Robin Jarvis

- First edition
- Author: Robin Jarvis
- Language: English
- Series: Deptford Histories
- Genre: Dark fantasy Adventure
- Publisher: Macdonald Young Books
- Publication date: 1995
- Publication place: United Kingdom
- Media type: Print (Hardcover & Paperback)
- Pages: 490 pp
- ISBN: 0-7500-1745-7
- OCLC: 34722186
- Preceded by: The Oaken Throne
- Followed by: The Deptford Mice Almanack

Thomas is a dark fantasy adventure novel for children by British author Robin Jarvis. It is the third book in The Deptford Histories trilogy, a series of prequels to Jarvis's Deptford Mice books, and serves as a backstory for the eponymous mouse mariner Thomas Triton. It was first published in the United Kingdom in 1995 by Macdonald Young Books. In 2006, it was published in the United States by Chronicle Books.

== Plot summary ==
Four years after the events of The Final Reckoning, midshipmouse Thomas Triton is troubled by memories of a traumatic incident in his youth that resulted in the death of his best friend, Woodget Pipple. His wife Gwen suggests that it would make him feel better if he wrote down what was bothering him.

Many years prior, Thomas is taken in by a kindly community of field mice after being caught in a snowstorm. There he meets Woodget, a little field mouse who becomes his close friend, and a beautiful maiden named Bess Sandibrook. Thomas falls deeply in love with Bess, but is unaware that Woodget has similar feelings for her. Stating that she loves Woodget, Bess gently rejects Thomas, only for them both to realise that Woodget has run away after mistakenly thinking he's getting in the way of their romance. Thomas vows to find Woodget, and catches up with him at a dock as a ship called the Calliope is getting ready to set sail. Thomas and Woodget meet a tough Irish mouse named Mulligan, who invites them to have a drink with him on the ship before he leaves. But they stay too long and to their dismay are stuck on the ship. The two become suspicious of Mulligan, who is evasive and will not let anyone see the contents of a satchel he always carries with him. The Calliope eventually crashes in a violent storm, killing most of its passengers.

Mulligan washes ashore in Crete with Dimlon, a simple-minded young mouse Thomas and Woodget befriended during the voyage. Dimlon drops his facade of innocence and reveals himself to Mulligan as Dahrem Ruhar, an adept of the Scale, an evil cult that worships a banished reptile god called Suruth Scarophion. Mulligan has been carrying a piece of a jade egg sacred to the Scale, trying to prevent them from obtaining it and joining it with the other pieces, which would create a vessel into which Scarophion can be reborn. Thomas and Woodget survived the storm as well, and come onto the island in time to see a dying Mulligan, poisoned by the blades of Dahrem. He has carried the egg fragment with him and pushes it into the horrified Woodget's paws, telling him to take it to a place called Hara. Thomas and Woodget are discovered by an army of Indian mongooses who demand to know where they got the egg fragment from. After they explain the situation, the mongooses offer to take the two mice to Hara, their home city in India so they can speak to the sadhu and ask his advice. Dahrem, once again in the guise of Dimlon, comes along with them. Upon their arrival in Hara, Thomas, Woodget and mongoose Captain Chattan go to see the sadhu, who also possesses a piece of the jade egg of Scarophion. In the night, the Scale arrive and launch a vicious attack on the city of Hara to steal the fragment. To everyone's shock, it is the sadhu himself who opens the gates for the Scale to enter. Dahrem attacks Woodget in the sadhu's chamber, demanding that he hand over the egg fragment Mulligan gave him. Thomas and Chattan hear the field mouse's screams and come to his rescue. Chattan engages in battle with Dahrem, who demonstrates his ability as an adept to tear his mammalian flesh off and assume the form of a lizard. Ultimately Dahrem is killed, but not before poisoning Chattan with his blades.

Faced with nowhere else to go, Thomas and Woodget decide to head to Singapore, where it is said that the jerboa prophet Simoon has journeyed. In a seedy bar called the Lotus Parlour, Thomas accidentally lets it slip to the bar's owner, Ma Skillet, that he and Woodget have the final egg fragment. Simoon is present and scolds the two mice for having walked directly into Scale territory. The bar is full of members of the cult (including Ma Skillet, the high priestess) who capture Thomas, Woodget, and Simoon and take them to their temple. The high priest joins the egg fragments together, and it appears Suruth Scarophion will be reborn. But as the reptilian form writhes within the newly created egg, it suddenly shrivels and dies. Simoon reveals that it was the plan all along to let the Scale obtain every piece of the egg, as he and other members of the Green Council like the sadhu knew it would ultimately be useless. The fragment held by Mulligan was periodically moved to different shrines to the benevolent Green Mouse deity, and thus gradually became a holy object. Cast from the ruined egg, Scarophion's spirit enters a nearby statue in his image. Riding on its back, the enraged high priest chases Thomas, Woodget, and Simoon. The statue is destroyed when it crashes on a crag of rock, and Woodget kills the high priest to save Thomas's life.

At the end of the journey, Thomas and Woodget are at a dock in Singapore waiting for a ship to take them back to England. An old beggar approaches them, but soon they discover that it is Ma Skillet, former high priestess of the Scale. She puts Thomas into a trance, during which he picks up Woodget and casts him into the water. Despite the field mouse's pleas, Thomas lets him presumably drown. Hours later, Thomas emerges from the trance and to his horror, remembers what he has done. He screams in anguish.

In present day Hara, Chattan's sister Sobhan is taking her grandson to see the sadhu. She tries to help the latter remember his former identity, but he responds that Zenna, the siren who rescued him from the sea, wiped his memory completely and he is content that way. The final line reveals that this new sadhu is none other than Woodget.

== Background ==
Robin Jarvis has stated that since he created the midshipmouse Thomas Triton, he wanted to explore the character's dark past, hinted at in The Deptford Mice books: "In the original trilogy, he was always keeping some dark secret back until we finally learn that somehow he was responsible for the death of his best friend, Woodget. With that in mind I set about compiling his history and writing his memoirs." For this novel, he wanted an entirely different sort of enemy, which is how he came up with the idea for the cult of the banished serpent god. Jarvis "found their habit of ripping their skins off to be quite revolting and terrifying, but its a perfectly logical and necessary thing for them to do." Zenna, the siren who becomes infatuated with Woodget after he defends her from her mocking sisters, was named after the daughter of a librarian Jarvis met when he visited her school in Shropshire.

== Reception ==
Regarding Thomas, Ilene Cooper of Booklist said "its archaic sentence structures and florid word choices are problematic, but series fans probably won't mind. They'll find the familiar mix of violent and heroic acts that has made the series popular." Kirkus Reviews called it "a rousing tale of horror and heroism."
