= Deathscent =

2001 novel by Robin Jarvis

- First edition (publ. Collins)
- Author: Robin Jarvis
- Publisher: CollinsVoyager
- Publication date: April 2, 2001
- ISBN: 978-0-006-75386-5

Deathscent is a children's novel written by British novelist Robin Jarvis set in an alternate Tudor England. it was published in 2001 and is intended to be part of a longer series, entitled "Intrigues of the Reflected Realm," however sequels are yet to appear. During an interview in 2011, Jarvis stated he wished to continue the series and had worked out the plot for the second book in the series, though also said he wasn't sure when work on it may begin.

The story concerns the arrival, via a strange craft, of an alien called Brindle, hailed as a heavenly messenger. He is rescued by the Elizabethan people of Malmes-Wutton, who nurse him back to health. The initial fear brought about by the unusual facial feature on his forehead, is soon gone as Brindle shows himself to be a caring friendly individual. Malmes-Wutton itself, rather than being a part of the English countryside, is a floating island encased in a glass dome, and like the other floating islands of Englandia, is part of the collection of islands making up the uplifted isles of the Reflected Realm, where in place of animals there are mechanicals, and people live greatly extended lives. After befriending the two young apprentices who work in the workshop of Malmes-Wutton, he travels with them when they depart to return to the capital of Englandia to work on war machines. Brindle appears to be the picture of innocence, and a dedicated and protective friend when the looming threat of the Spanish ambassador, his rather unusual and evil mechanical creature and other fearsome characters become more than potential problems. The reader continually discovers many other unusual aspects of this alternative "Tudor England" and, as the story develops, it is clear that Brindle himself is not all he appears, as events lead to some rather disturbing discoveries. The title 'Deathscent' represents the smell of death- Brindle and his kind have a far greater understanding of smell, but the best is smell of death when someone is killed. Notice the line 'Wars have been fought for it', instead of over it.

"Across the stark heavens the mysterious object came blazing, swerving and spinning in all directions, growing larger with every passing moment. There was no time to panic, no time to raise alarm.

Out in the deep darkness float the ninety-three isles of the beautified realm of Britain. Elizabeth Tudor is celebrating her one hundred and seventy-eighth year on the throne of Englandia. Into this world a place with no living animals and arcane technology appears a visitor, bringing with him strange devices and sinister practices. He’s about to change things forever."
