= Thorn Ogres of Hagwood =

1999 novel by Robin Jarvis

- First edition cover
- Author: Robin Jarvis
- Language: English
- Series: The Hagwood Trilogy
- Genre: Fantasy novel
- Publisher: Puffin Open Road Media Teen & Tween
- Publication date: 1999 11 December 2012
- Publication place: United Kingdom
- Media type: Print (Paperback)
- ISBN: 014130085X
- OCLC: 42039631
- Followed by: Dark Waters of Hagwood; War in Hagwood

Thorn Ogres of Hagwood is the first book in the Hagwood trilogy by Robin Jarvis. It was originally published in 1999 by Penguin House, then re-published on 11 December 2012 by Open Road Media Teen & Tween, where the rest of the series was subsequently published. The sequel, Dark Waters of Hagwood, was released on 4 June 2013, and the final book of the trilogy, War in Hagwood, was released on 26 July 2016.

== Plot introduction ==
The werlings of Hagwood (small creatures with the ability to transform into animals) live peacefully in the trees of the forest, overlooked and unbothered while they leisurely perfect the art of wergling (shape-changing). But unlike his fellow werlings, the bumbling Gamaliel Tumpin can’t manage to wergle into even the simplest of forms (a mouse) like his peers. He’s tormented by his sister, Kernella, and teased by his classmates. And he envies star student Finnen Lufkin, who can transform into almost any creature. But wergling will soon be the least of Gamaliel’s troubles. The evil elf queen Rhiannon, the High Lady of the Hollow Hill, is desperately seeking a precious possession that was stolen long ago. Her evil knows no bounds, and with her army of monstrous thorn ogres, she will not stop until it’s found. The werlings’ peaceful existence is threatened by death and danger, and clumsy, awkward Gamaliel will need to call on the strength within him to fight for his family and his home.
