= A Warlock in Whitby =

1995 fantasy novel

- First edition cover
- Author: Robin Jarvis
- Language: English
- Series: The Whitby Witches
- Genre: Fantasy novel
- Publisher: Hodder Wayland
- Publication date: 1995
- Publication place: United Kingdom
- Media type: Print (Hardcover & Paperback)
- ISBN: 0-7500-0581-5
- OCLC: 24671201
- Preceded by: the Whitby Witches
- Followed by: The Whitby Child

A Warlock in Whitby is the second book in The Whitby Witches series by Robin Jarvis. It was originally published in 1995. The trilogy is said to draw "deeply on local history, myth and legend. The books are deeply creepy and utterly compelling."

== Plot summary ==
Set in the seaside town of Whitby just before Bonfire Night, the novel is set a few months after The Whitby Witches. Having failed to retrieve the moonkelp, Nelda is forced to marry the wicked aged Esau Grendel. A fish Demon from the distant past that was imprisoned beneath the Earth after the imprisonment of the Monstrous serpent Morgawrus, awakes once more and haunts Whitby, eating cats. Rowena Cooper's husband, Nathaniel Crozier travels to Whitby to find out what happened to his wife. Tricking Aunt Alice into leaving Whitby for London to see her dying friend Patricia, Nathaniel realizes the staff of Hilda was one of four magical objects created to defend the world against Morgawrus. Nathaniel plans to destroy these guardians and unleash Morgawrus upon the world, planning to use him to take over. Followed by Ben, Nathaniel goes to a church where he finds one guardian and destroys it. He then discovers that the second guardian belongs to the elderly Mr Roper, a friend of Ben's whom he kills although not before Roper is able to give the guardian to Ben. Nathaniel threatens Jennet who is bewitched by him, forcing Ben to hand over the guardian which he promptly destroys, loosing Morgwrus. He then goes to try and take over Morgawrus while setting the Fish Demon loose in the Aufwader caves, knowing that the last guardian is somewhere there. In exchange for allowing Esau to make love to her, conceiving their child, Esau gives Nelda the last guardian which she gives to Tarr. Esau is killed by the Fish Demon before it is killed as the caves are destroyed as a result of Morgawrus breaking free. Nathaniel attempts to bewitch Morgwrus but is stopped by Aunt Alice who has returned from London, Patricia having been murdered by a slave of Nathaniel's. Nathaniel is killed by Morgawrus who attempts to kill Aunt Alice. However the old woman uses the book of shadows, given to her by Patricia, a book which contains all she knows, to defeat Morgawrus who is imprisoned once more. But this brave act is too much for the old woman and her body gives up. She becomes a feeble helpless old thing, reliant on the work of her friends, family and Doctor to just continue living.
