= The Whitby Witches =

1991 book by Robin Jarvis

- First edition cover
- Author: Robin Jarvis
- Language: English
- Series: The Whitby Witches
- Genre: Fantasy novel
- Publisher: Hodder Wayland
- Publication date: 1991
- Publication place: United Kingdom
- Media type: Print (Hardcover & Paperback)
- ISBN: 0-7500-0581-5
- OCLC: 24671201
- Followed by: A Warlock in Whitby

The Whitby Witches is the first book in The Whitby Witches series by Robin Jarvis. It was originally published in the United Kingdom in 1991, and republished in 2006 in the United States.

== Plot summary ==
After the deaths of their parents, eight-year-old orphan Ben and his older sister, Jennet, have been pushed from foster home to foster home for the majority of their young lives. After they have lived at a dreary hostel for a few months, the mistress Mrs Rodice has the children hauled off to live in the seaside village of Whitby, with relish. Ben and Jennet do not get along as Ben possesses a sixth sense meaning that he can see the spirits of dead people, including his parents. Jennet does not share this gift and therefore assumes he is lying and deliberately causing trouble. It is Ben's uncanny ability to see the dead that has caused him and his sister to be shunted between homes, as the families fostering them are unnerved by Ben.

Upon the arrival in Whitby, the children are adopted by a kind and eccentric elderly spinster named Miss Alice Boston, a former university lecturer. She and the children take to each other almost immediately, despite the children being a little bemused by Miss Boston's (or Aunt Alice as they grew to call her) odd mannerisms and lifestyle. Miss Boston tells Ben the scary stories of Whitby much to his delight as he adores horror stories, but Jennet does not approve as she believes it will encourage his lies and his stories that he can see their dead parents.

Miss Boston is friends with many of the elderly spinsters in the Whitby community. The widowed Mrs Prudence Joyster, whose late husband was in the army; the batty, cat-loving Miss Matilda Droon, Miss Edith Whethers the postmistress, and the wealthy and grossly obese Dora Banbury-Scott, twice the widow who refuses to grow old gracefully. Ben and Jennet settle into Whitby and Ben encounters the "Fisher Folk", or the "Aufwader" as they call themselves, a reclusive and mysterious tribe of humanoid dwarf-like beings who are unseen by all except those with the sixth sense. Ben meets Nelda Shrimp, the youngest of the diminishing tribe and her aunt, Hesper Gull. They tell them that their kind are forbidden to fraternise with humans as it has done nothing but cause grief in the past. But Nelda has a premonition that Ben is involved in the fate of their tribe.

The Fisher Folk were once plentiful in centuries past, until the witch-doctor of the tribes, Oona, fell in love with a human fisherman and together they produced a half-breed child. Enraged with this act of violation the Lords of the Deep, spirit-lords of the oceans, killed the fisherman and Oona committed suicide. Cheated of revenge, the Lords of the Deep turned to the Fisher Folks and condemned all the mothers and their newborns to die in childbirth, meaning that the tribes would never prosper. Nelda's own mother fell victim to this terrible fate along with so many other female Aufwaders.

Meanwhile, a newcomer in town, Mrs Rowena Cooper, opens up a new antiques shop, and begins making herself very popular with the Whitby residents, by donating large sums of money to charity and charming even the most disagreeable neighbours. After being invited to tea at Mrs Cooper's house, Miss Boston and Mrs Joyster are instantly suspicious; Mrs Cooper appears ditzy, childish and too friendly for their liking. However, she has managed to woo over Miss Whethers, Miss Droon and Mrs Banbury-Scott most of all, whom she practically force-feeds expensive chocolates. After they leave, Miss Boston and Mrs Joyster share their doubts about Mrs Cooper, and Mrs Joyster is certain she has seen her before, but cannot recall where or when. She returns to her seaside cottage and reads her late husband's journal. In its pages, she discovers a horrifying truth:

Rowena Cooper is in fact an evil woman named Roslyn Crosier, who, along with her diabolical husband Nathan, tormented and tortured an African tribe, inflicting unspeakable cruelty on them using black magic. The journal briefly mentions a gigantic black dog which terrified the tribe. Overcome with fury, she confronts Cooper, who reveals the truth of her identity and mocks Prudence, who is killed on the way home when an enormous black dog attacks her.

Ben discovers that Nelda fears for her missing father, especially as a corpse has been discovered and has been identified as her uncle, Silas, a fiendish member of the tribe, and Hesper's husband. Hesper and Nelda tell Ben that they are searching for the moon kelp, a magical plant stolen from the Lords of the Deep, and if returned, the Deep Ones will grant the wish of anyone who finds it. Hesper wants to use it to lift the curse from the tribe. Shortly after Prudence's death, a hand of glory is stolen from the museum, and Mrs Banbury-Scott's manor is seriously vandalized, yet she and her entire staff slept peacefully through the chaos. At Prudence's funeral, Mrs Banbury-Scott dies apparently of a heart attack, and has bequeathed her entire estate to Rowena.

Ben and Nelda continue to hunt for the moon-kelp, but Nelda's family are outcast from the tribe when a murdered body is found, believed to be Hesper's evil husband, Silas. Nelda's missing father, Abe, is blamed for the crime. Meanwhile, Jennet stumbles upon a tragic, lonely nun named Sister Bridget, being tormented and threatened by Rowena.
