= M. I. McAllister =

British writer (born 1956)

Margaret I. McAllister is an English author of children's books, born in 1956. She grew up on the north-east coast of England. Her first book, A Friend for Rachel (also called The Secret Mice) was published by the Oxford University Press in 1997. Urchin of the Riding Stars, the first in The Mistmantle Chronicles, was published by Bloomsbury Publishing in 2005. A Friend for Rachel and The Mistmantle Chronicles are now published by Purple House Press, who announced in October, 2024, that a sixth book in the Chronicles is forthcoming.

== Bibliography ==
- The Mistmantle Chronicles Book 1 : Urchin of the Riding Stars
- The Mistmantle Chronicles Book 2 : Urchin and the Heartstone
- The Mistmantle Chronicles Book 3 : The Heir of Mistmantle
- The Mistmantle Chronicles Book 4 : Urchin and the Raven War
- The Mistmantle Chronicles Book 5: Urchin and the Rage Tide
- The Mistmantle Chronicles Book 6: Tales of Mistmantle
- The Life Shop
- A Friend for Rachel
- Hold My Hand and Run
- Ghost at the Window
- The Octave of Angels
- Never Wash Your Hair
- The Worst of the Vikings
- The Mean Dream Wander Machine
- The Doughnut Dilemma
- Winner
- My Guinea Pig is Innocent
- Snow Troll
- Black Death
- Threads of Deceit
