= The Mistmantle Chronicles =

Children's novel series by M. I. McAllister

US Urchin of the Riding Stars cover.

The Mistmantle Chronicles is a series of children's novels by M. I. McAllister about anthropomorphic squirrels, hedgehogs, otters, and moles. The protagonist is a pale, honey-coloured Eurasian red squirrel named Urchin. The series is set in a world of islands that appears to lack any large landmasses.

The first book in the Mistmantle Chronicles, Urchin of the Riding Stars, was published by Bloomsbury Publishing in 2005.

== Books ==
=== Urchin of the Riding Stars (2005) ===
A squirrel named Urchin is born in Mistmantle on the night of the Riding Stars. There is a prophecy that he will take down a great leader. His mother dies in childbirth. He is found by Crispin and Fir, who give him to the loud and talkative Apple to raise. The rulers of Mistmantle, Queen Spindle and King Brushen, have a son who is then murdered. A pair of villains in disguise, Captain Husk and Lady Aspen, seize control of the island, introducing a regime of culling and forced labour.

=== Urchin and the Heartstone (2006) ===
The animals of Mistmantle prepare for the coronation of Crispin the squirrel. But when the Heartstone goes missing and Urchin gets kidnapped by some unexpected visitors from the island called Whitewings, panic begins to rise. Urchin knows he must escape the island before it's too late. Crispin does his part and many lives are risked to save Urchin. Along the way, Urchin gains a new friend and also discovers a secret about his past that will change his life forever.

=== The Heir of Mistmantle (2007) ===
The heir of Mistmantle, Princess Catkin, is kidnapped. A mysterious epidemic begins to ravage the island, and news starts spreading about sightings of the infamous Captain Husk, who everyone believed was dead. The inhabitants of Mistmantle begin to worry that these events are connected and that Husk will return. Urchin and his friend Juniper must recover Catkin before her life is in serious danger.

=== Urchin and the Raven War (2008) ===
Peace on Mistmantle is disrupted when Lord Arcneck returns to the island from Swan Isle, asking for help in a war against bloodthirsty ravens. King Crispin and his friends aid him, but they bring the wrath of the ravens down on Mistmantle. When the vengeful ravens attack Mistmantle Island, the animals of Mistmantle band together to defeat them.

== Islands ==
=== Mistmantle ===
Mistmantle is the island where the Mistmantle Chronicles are mainly set. It is a relatively small island with mists that surround it which keep those who would seek to harm Mistmantle and those who do not belong on the island away. Only a Voyager has been known to leave Mistmantle and return more than three times.

=== Swan Isle ===
About one-third into the first book, Crispin makes his way across the ocean and his voyage takes him to two other islands in the same chain as Mistmantle. One is a barren piece of stone while the other is dominated by giant crabs and other crustaceans, which he battles to escape. Eventually, he reaches an island far from Mistmantle, which is later identified as Swan Isle. It is where he meets Lord and Lady Arcneck, rulers of the island, and Whisper, a female red squirrel who later becomes his love interest.

=== Whitewings ===
Whitewings is a large island compared to Mistmantle and is about three days away by boat. In the second book, Urchin is taken there to satisfy the mad King Silverbirch's desire for silver. It has a large stone fortress a little way from the beach where Urchin is brought in; the fortress is destroyed by an earthquake at the end of the book.

=== Ashfire ===
Ashfire is the island where Cedar and Almond originally come from. It is home to an active volcano, or "fire mountain" as it is referred to in the books, and is known to have water poisonous to non-native creatures. Cedar and Almond left the island when they were young as the volcano erupted.

== Characters ==
=== Urchin ===
Urchin is a young, energetic and charismatic red squirrel who looks different from most. His fur is the colour of honey; only the tips of his ears and tail are the colour that identifies his species. He is born on a night of Riding Stars on the shore opposite to where Mistmantle Tower is located. His mother lives just long enough to give him a blessing. He is rescued by Crispin, then a skittish page, and Apple, who takes him in and raises him as her adopted son. Several years later he is approached by Crispin, who had since become a captain, and asks Urchin to be his page, which he accepts enthusiastically.

=== Crispin ===
Crispin is a red squirrel who is a captain of Mistmantle. He finds Urchin on the shore when he is a new captain. In the first book Crispin is exiled after being falsely accused of murder and ends up on Swan Isle, where he meets a red squirrel called Whisper, whom he later marries. She is later murdered by Gloss the mole. Crispin journeys back to Mistmantle with Urchin on the backs of swans and helps to save Mistmantle from Husk.

=== Husk ===
Husk is an ambitious squirrel who seeks to take over the island in the first book by influencing the king's decisions. He becomes evil when he discovers an old pit beneath Mistmantle Tower where the kings of old made sacrifices. He murders babies that have physical disabilities with the help of his girlfriend and later wife, Lady Aspen. After his plots are revealed by Captain Padra, he is pursued and dies falling into the pit. His body isn't discovered until book three, when Juniper, his son, goes looking for him to disprove rumours that Husk is alive.

=== Padra ===
Padra is an otter with a face that looks as if he is always about to laugh. He is Crispin's best friend. He, Husk, and Crispin are all captains in book one. Padra is very angry when Crispin is exiled from Mistmantle, and takes Urchin on as a page after Crispin enters the Mists. Padra has a longtime girlfriend called Arran, and they get married at the end of book one. In book two they have twins, Tide and Swanfeather. He is the older brother of Fingal. In book five, he and Arran have another baby whom they name Fionn.

=== Arran ===
Arran is Padra's longtime girlfriend and later wife. She is made a captain of Mistmantle at the end of book one and resigns in book five as she wishes to spend more time with her young daughter, Fionn.

=== Lugg ===
Lugg is a down-to-earth, brave and determined mole who is a member of the Circle and a captain. In book one, Lugg aids Urchin in his adventures and fights alongside Padra in the battle against Husk. After he is named king, Crispin makes Lugg a captain. In the third book, Lugg dies after he tries to stop Linty from taking Catkin away from the island and his heart gives out. Fingal names his boat after Lugg.

=== Brother Fir ===
Brother Fir is Mistmantle's priest in books one to four. He is said to have kind, wise eyes and a depth of joy that no one else has. He dies peacefully of old age in book four. Juniper becomes the next priest.

=== Sepia ===
Sepia is a kind, caring squirrel with the sweetest voice on the island, and is the leader of the Choir. She is introduced in book one, at the Spring Festival, and becomes a main character throughout the other books. She rescues Princess Catkin in book three because she is the only one calm and kind enough to get past Mistress Linty, Catkin's captor. She and Urchin have a developing relationship throughout the series; he proposes to her at the end of book five and she accepts.

=== Juniper ===
Juniper is Urchin's friend that helps him throughout his journeys; they consider each other brothers. He limps due to a twisted paw and later discovers his prophetic powers. In book three, he finds out Husk was his father when his foster mother Damson is on her deathbed, making him afraid he will turn out like Husk. He becomes the island's priest when Brother Fir dies in book four.

=== Needle ===
Needle the hedgehog is Urchin's friend who sticks with him throughout all his adventures. She is a little sharper than most hedgehogs. Needle is a seamstress in the castle and is made part of the Circle with Urchin in book three. Urchin and Lugg rescue Needle's younger brother Scufflen from Husk, who sentences him to be culled in book one.

=== Cedar ===
Cedar is a squirrel from the island of Whitewings. She first appears in book two, where she is undercover in King Silverbirch's court. She plays a significant role in helping Urchin escape from King Silverbirch and rebels against Silverbirch. At the end of the book, Cedar goes to Mistmantle and marries King Crispin. In the remaining books, she is the queen of Mistmantle and a useful healer.
