= The Dark Portal =

Novel by Robin Jarvis

- First edition
- Author: Robin Jarvis
- Language: English
- Series: The Deptford Mice
- Genre: Dark fantasy
- Publisher: Macdonald & Company
- Publication date: 1989
- Publication place: United Kingdom
- Media type: Print (Hardcover & Paperback)
- Pages: 240
- ISBN: 9781587171123
- OCLC: 849988788
- Followed by: The Crystal Prison

The Dark Portal is a dark fantasy novel for children by British author Robin Jarvis. The first book in The Deptford Mice trilogy and Jarvis's debut novel, it follows the story of Audrey Brown, a mouse girl who is looking for her missing father. Her search takes her into the sewers of Deptford where, with the help of her friends and family, she must face an army of evil rats and their living god, a mysterious being known as Jupiter.

The book was first published in the United Kingdom by Macdonald & Company in 1989, and was a runner-up for that year's Nestlé Smarties Book Prize. In 2000, it was published by SeaStar Books in the United States and given the Booklist Editors' Choice designation.

In March 2024, Pushkin Children's Books reissued The Dark Portal in paperback and ebook formats. The text was given "a thorough dusting" and new illustrations were done by Jarvis.

== Plot ==
A community of mice lives an idyllic existence in an old empty house in the London borough of Deptford. The only problem they have is a fear of the vicious rats in the sewers below who worship a mysterious living god called Jupiter. No one has ever seen Jupiter, not even his subjects, and rumours abound as to who or what he truly is. One mouse named Albert Brown is drawn into the sewers by dark enchantments on the grill in the house's basement. He meets a young city mouse named Piccadilly who is also lost and the two quickly become friends. After hours of wandering they find themselves in the altar chamber of Jupiter. Whilst eavesdropping on a conversation between the evil being and his rat lieutenant, Morgan, Albert is captured and taken away to be killed by Jupiter. Unable to save himself, he tells Piccadilly to run for his life.

The next morning is the Great Spring Celebration, an important holiday for the mice when those who have come of age are given mousebrasses, magical talismans that help guide them through their lives. This year Albert's children Arthur and Audrey will receive theirs, but Audrey is too preoccupied with thoughts of her missing father to be excited about the festivities. When Audrey goes to get her mousebrass, she is shocked to encounter the Green Mouse, a benevolent deity worshipped by the mice, who personally hands her a pendant known as the Anti-Cat Charm. Her family is doubtful when Audrey tells them about her experience, but do wonder at the mousebrass she received. The Anti-Cat Charm is rarely given out as cats are never seen in the area. That night, Audrey slips into the sewers to visit a rat fortune teller named Madame Akkikuyu, hoping she can tell her where her father is. However, the mouse soon determines that Akkikuyu is a fraud and angrily leaves. On her way back through the sewers Audrey meets Piccadilly. When he learns she is the daughter of Albert, Piccadilly presents the latter's mousebrass which had been entrusted to him. Gently, he tries to tell Audrey that Albert is likely dead, but she refuses to believe him and calls him a coward for abandoning her father when he needed aid. Arthur and his friends the albino mouse Oswald and fieldmouse Twit enter the sewers to search for the missing Audrey, eventually finding her and Piccadilly after they all fight off a gang of rats.

The group returns to the house and Audrey's mother Gwen is given Albert's mousebrass. Upon hearing Piccadilly's story, she stoically accepts her husband's death and makes her children promise never to enter the sewers again. This becomes a problem when Audrey realises her own mousebrass is missing and guesses it was lost during her trip to the sewers. Knowing that she must get it back because the Green Mouse told her to keep it always, she asks Oswald to look for it with his dowsing rod, also goading Piccadilly into accompanying him to prove he is not a coward. Waiting at the grill for them to return and regretting her callous treatment of Piccadilly, Audrey is kidnapped by rats sent by Jupiter, who is concerned about a prophecy he heard that the girl will defeat him. Meanwhile, Piccadilly and Oswald come across some sleeping rats, one of whom has Audrey's mousebrass. They quietly remove it, but just then the rats begin waking up. Promising to bring help, Piccadilly is able to get away, but Oswald finds himself having to pose as a rat to avoid detection. In doing so, he learns that Jupiter has been planning to unleash the Black Death on the world once more, which will rid it of humans and enable him to conquer it.

Audrey is taken to Jupiter's altar chamber, where she has a tense confrontation with the malevolent deity, who emerges from his dark lair for the first time in hundreds of years to reveal himself as a hideous giant cat. A group of mice including Piccadilly, Arthur, Gwen, Twit, and grizzled seafarer Thomas Triton show up in the altar chamber to battle Jupiter as well. Oswald appears from a nearby tunnel and returns Audrey's Anti-Cat Charm to her, which she then throws at Jupiter. The evil cat is dazzled by brilliant green flames that explode from the mousebrass, losing his balance and falling into the water rapidly flooding his chamber. The spirits of the many mice and rats he has tortured and devoured then rise up and drag Jupiter down to a watery grave. Audrey glimpses her father among the legion of spirits as they depart and despairs before finally accepting his death. The sewer floods and the Black Death is destroyed. Thankful that they are alive, and resolving to celebrate Jupiter's downfall once they return home, the mice begin the journey back to the surface.

== Main characters ==
- Audrey Brown is a spunky, intelligent mouse girl with a sharp tongue that often gets her into trouble. She loves to daydream and enjoys dressing up in lacy outfits and wearing ribbons in her hair. When her father goes missing, she refuses to believe he is dead and sets out to find him.
- Arthur Brown is the brother of Audrey, a plump, jolly mouse who often becomes irritated by his sister's saucy attitude and tendency to seemingly dream up wild, fantastic stories. Jarvis has indicated that he based the character of Arthur on himself.
- Piccadilly is a cheeky and independent young grey mouse from the city who speaks with a Cockney accent. He is an orphan whose parents were killed by an underground train. While on a foraging expedition, he becomes lost in the sewers where he encounters Albert Brown. When the two stumble upon the altar chamber of Jupiter, Albert is captured while Piccadilly barely escapes with his life. He eventually meets up with Audrey, who blames him for abandoning her father.
- William 'Twit' Scuttle is a kindhearted country mouse who is the cousin of Oswald Chitter. The result of a forbidden union between a house mouse and a field mouse, he is viewed by most as a simpleton with "no cheese upstairs".
- Oswald Chitter is a frail albino mouse whose mother fusses over him. Because of how tall and awkward he is, to his chagrin he is sometimes mistaken for a rat. He has the ability to find lost objects with a divining rod.
- Thomas Triton is a retired midshipmouse who makes his home aboard the Cutty Sark. He befriends Twit when the latter is unexpectedly dropped onto the ship by the bats Orfeo and Eldritch.
- Jupiter is a mysterious evil being worshipped as a living god by the rats in the sewers of Deptford. He lives in a shadowy portal and no one has ever seen any more of him than his blazing red eyes.
- Morgan is a cruel piebald Cornish rat who serves as Jupiter's loyal lieutenant.
- Madame Akkikuyu is a black rat from Morocco who travels around posing as a fortune teller. Though she lacks true magical powers, she has always longed to possess them.
- Orfeo and Eldritch are bat brothers who can see into the future. The problem is that they intentionally make their visions as vague as possible so no one can interpret them until the events actually happen.
- Albert Brown is the father of Audrey and Arthur. A strange force compels him to enter the sewers where he meets a horrible end at the claws of Jupiter. His disappearance sets the story in motion.
- The Green Mouse is the benevolent deity worshipped by the mice. A rodent version of the mythical Green Man, he is the essence of nature and all growing things. His power is strongest in the spring and dies completely in the winter.

== Background ==
Jarvis came up with the idea for The Deptford Mice trilogy while working as a model-maker for television programmes and commercials. He had been designing a big, furry alien but decided to take a break and draw something small. That something was a mouse who would become the character Oswald Chitter. Jarvis continued to doodle mice, and when a friend of his saw the sketches, he suggested they be sent to a publisher. The publisher responded positively and asked if there was a story to accompany the drawings. At the time there wasn't one, but Jarvis then wrote the story of The Deptford Mice. He had originally envisioned it as a picture book, but it became a 70,000 word manuscript. When Jarvis's editor told him that the manuscript could make a trilogy due to its long length, he went away and cut it, and then came up with more ideas for the second and third books.

== Reception ==
The Dark Portal has been praised as "a tale of horror and valor, good and evil, leavened with humor." A starred review from Publishers Weekly called the book a "spooky and enthralling animal fantasy just right for Redwall fans" and added that Jarvis "provides counterpoint to the heart-racing adventure with scenes of haunting beauty, including Audrey's mystical encounter with the Green Mouse and the country mouse Twit's nocturnal flight over London. The author conveys a sense of place powerful enough to elevate the South London boroughs of Greenwich and Blackheath to requisite stops on any bookish child's literary tour of the British capital." Deirdre B. Root of Kliatt found The Dark Portal to be "entertaining and genuinely frightening." According to Patty Campbell of The Horn Book Magazine, "as publishers jockey for position in the 'what do I read after H[arry] P[otter]?' fantasy sweepstakes, only one new series has emerged as a serious contender, Robin Jarvis's saga of the Deptford mice, The Dark Portal." The book also received a positive review in The Sacramento Bee stating that "this fast-paced suspense tale is all heart in its gripping story of good vs. evil and life-threatening confrontations beneath the streets of London."

Lloyd Alexander called The Dark Portal "a grand-scale epic" that is "filled with high drama, suspense, and some genuine terror", while Madeleine L'Engle said that "Robin Jarvis joins the ranks of Kenneth Grahame, Richard Adams, and Walter Wangerin in the creation of wonderfully anthropomorphic animals. Audrey and Arthur Brown tell us a lot about ourselves." Peter Glassman, owner of the New York City children's bookstore Books of Wonder, obtained a copy of The Dark Portal while on a trip to London. He greatly enjoyed it and would now and then come across others who had as well. The author of The Outsiders, S. E. Hinton, once told Glassman that The Deptford Mice novels became her son's favorites after finding them in Britain, but she could not understand why they were not yet available in the United States. Glassman would eventually obtain the rights for his company, SeaStar Books, to publish the trilogy and make it more readily available to American readers.

== Adaptations ==
=== Cancelled film ===
In the mid-1990s, there were plans for Jim Henson Pictures to make a film adaptation of The Deptford Mice, which would be based on the story of The Dark Portal and feature animatronic puppets. The project was ultimately abandoned for reasons unknown.

=== Theatre ===
In 2010 London-based theatre company Tiny Dog Productions created the first official stage production of The Dark Portal under licence from Robin Jarvis. After successful preview showings at The Space Theatre, London.; the production was again performed in April 2011 at the New Wimbledon Theatre.
