= Marjolein Bastin =

Dutch artist

Marjolein Bastin (née uit den Bogaard) (born 1943) is a Dutch nature artist, writer, children's author and illustrator. She is the creator of the character "Vera the Mouse".

== Biography ==
Bastin was born in Loenen (aan de Vecht) and studied at the Academy of Arts in Arnhem, where she met her husband and manager Gaston Bastin. Her father was educator and photographer John Henri uit den Bogaard (1911-1993). They have a daughter, Sanna (born in 1973), and a son, Mischa (born in 1974). Sanna runs the "Marjolein Bastin Kadowinkel" (The Marjolein Bastin Giftshop) while Mischa is a lawyer in Kansas City, USA. Marjolein and Gaston divide their time between country homes in the Netherlands and Missouri, and a tropical retreat in the Cayman Islands.

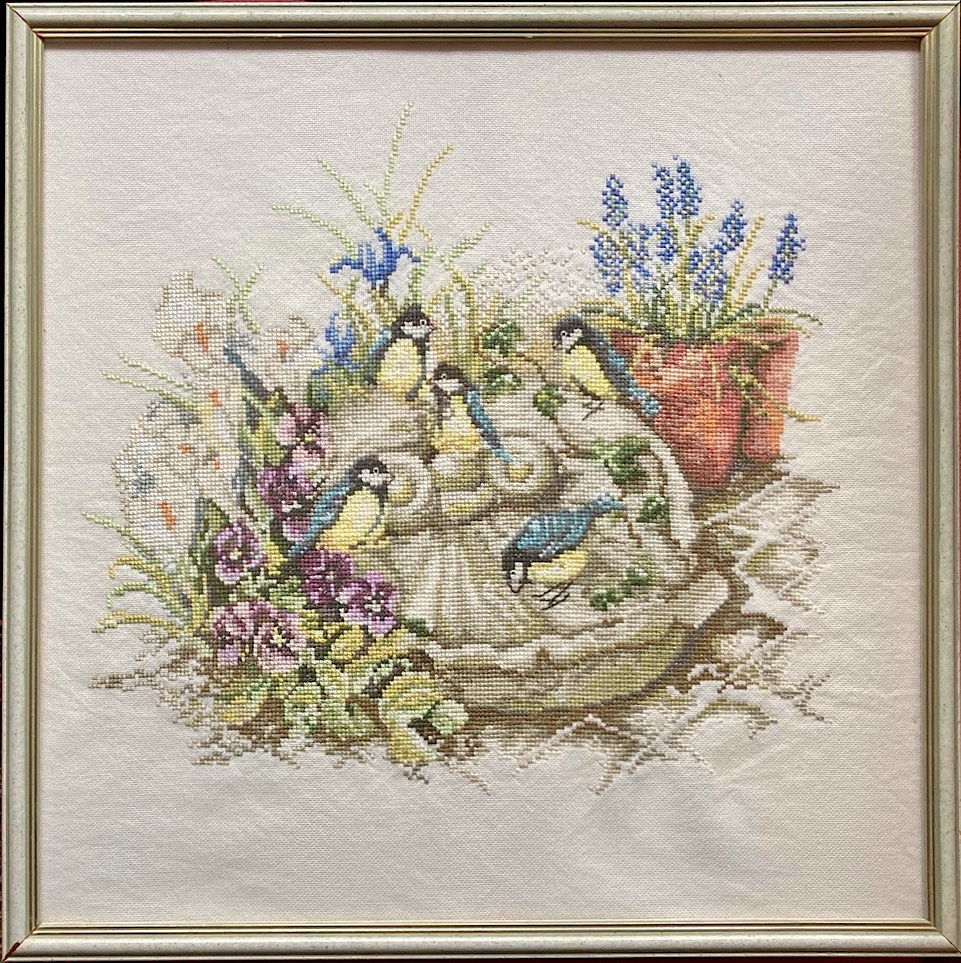
Embroidery of great tits around a water bowl with black grapes in the background (made by S.C. Bakker, ca. 1989). Design by Marjolein Bastin.

From 1960 to 1965, Bastin worked for different advertising agencies and publishers. Shortly after completing her studies at the Academy of Arts, she was asked to illustrate a one-page feature for the popular Dutch women's weekly Libelle. A Hallmark Cards designer discovered Bastin's artwork while on a trip to the Netherlands in the early 1990s. Stationery, greeting cards, home décor items and gifts in Hallmark's Nature's Sketchbook by Marjolein Bastin line are among the company's best-selling offerings. Many of her drawings are available as cross-stitch patterns, through Lanarte. Heye Puzzles offer Bastin's work as jigsaw puzzles.

In Good Housekeeping in 2003 she is quoted as saying, "I love the familiar and ordinary" and, "[t]he world that lies before us every day is just as beautiful as what's exotic and rare. Nature makes us all rich."

In Country Living in 2004 her garden was described as combining both formal manicured lines (e.g. topiary) along with "wild and woolly habitats" to encourage visits from a variety of different animals.

== Works ==
- 1985 – My Name Is Vera (Vera the Mouse Series)
- 1985 – Vera's Special Hobbies
- 1985 – Vera Dresses Up
- 1985 – Vera and her Friends
- 1986 – Vera the Mouse
- 1988 – Games With Vera
- 1988 – Vera in the Garden
- 1988 – Vera in the Kitchen
- 1988 – Vera in the Washtub
- 1991 – Nature Diary
- 1991 – A Little Dog for Vera
- 1994 – Flowers A to Z
- 1994 – From My Window
- 1994 – Nature's Sketchbook
- 1995 – Gardener's Companion
- 1995 – A Walk in the Woods
- 1996 – Seasons of Friendship
- 1998 – Butterflies - Winged Miracles of Nature
- 2004 – View From a Sketchbook: Nature Through the Eyes of Marjolein Bastin (with Tovah Martin)

In 2000 Vera starred in a 30-minute animated movie called "Vera the Mouse: Mr. Mole's Surprise".
