= Fleabee's Fortune =

- Author: Robin Jarvis
- Language: English
- Series: The Deptford Mouselets
- Genre: Dark fantasy
- Publisher: Hodder Headline
- Publication date: 14 October 2004
- Publication place: United Kingdom
- Media type: Print (paperback)
- Pages: 240
- ISBN: 978-0-340-85510-2
- OCLC: 670447561
- Followed by: Whortle's Hope

Fleabee's Fortune is a dark fantasy novel for children by British author Robin Jarvis. It is the first book in The Deptford Mouselets series, prequels to Jarvis's Deptford Mice trilogy aimed at a slightly younger audience. It was first published in the United Kingdom in 2004. The story is set in the sewers of Deptford and focuses on a rat girl named Fleabee who is unusually kindhearted.

== Synopsis ==
Fleabee, a young rat living in the sewers of Deptford, is unlike others of her kind. She is good-natured and doesn't wish to harm anything. However, the Festival of the First Blood is approaching, a coming-of-age tradition for the rats when they must commit their first murder. If they fail to do so, they will be killed themselves. Even the dark magic of Jupiter, lord of the rats, cannot instill bloodlust in Fleabee.

Though rat culture requires that they be cold and uncaring, Fleabee's mother Klakkweena is secretly concerned for her daughter's safety. She wonders if Fleabee is not meant to follow Jupiter but the Raith Sidhe, the three ancient usurped gods of the rats. Klakkweena surreptitiously takes Fleabee to the fortune-teller Madame Akkikuyu, who agrees that Fleabee should consult Mabb, the goddess of the Raith Sidhe. Akkikuyu gives Fleabee a Mabb Rest, a special pillow used to summon her in dreams. That night, not only does Mabb appear but also 'Orace Baldmony, the ghost of a rat who defected from Jupiter and converted to the religion of the benevolent Green Mouse. Baldmony tells Fleabee she has a good heart and should resist the evil Mabb. But Fleabee cannot see another way out of her predicament and agrees to become Mabb's new high priestess. When she wakes up, Fleabee finds an amethyst-encrusted dagger on her pillow, a gift from the goddess.

At the Festival of the First Blood, Fleabee keeps wondering what Mabb is going to do to help save her. Then a light appears on the enchanted dagger, and she is led to an ancient temple of the Raith Sidhe hidden deep within the sewers. In it are three altars dedicated to the deities Hobb, Mabb, and Bauchan. Behind the altar of Mabb, Fleabee suddenly hears frightened sobs. A young grey squirrel named Ambrose is hiding there. He was captured that night for the purpose of being a victim for the juvenile rats, and managed to escape from them. Fleabee realises that Mabb intends for her to sacrifice Ambrose on the altar. She refuses, stating that she wouldn't kill for Jupiter and she won't for Mabb either. 'Orace Baldmony's ghost appears and informs Fleabee that she must leave the sewers as soon as possible. After telling her sister Scabmona goodbye, Fleabee escapes with Ambrose to the world above where she plans to start a new life. The epilogue reveals that one day after many years have gone by, Fleabee will return to the sewers and have a final confrontation with the affronted and vengeful Mabb.

== Background ==
In writing this book Jarvis says he "wanted to show life from the rat point of view for a change and had lots of fun with it, especially with Fleabee's sister, the completely horrible Scabmona."

== Reception ==
Dani Colvin of The Sunday Tasmanian called the book "a deliciously, delightfully dark read for ages nine and up" and added that "the characters, though ghastly, are hugely enjoyable and some, most notably Fleabee's mother Klakkweena and sister Scabmona, still manage to be more than one-dimensional."
