= Robin Jarvis =

British novelist

Robin Jarvis (born 8 May 1963) is a British young adult fiction (YA) and children's novelist, who writes dark fantasy, suspense and supernatural thrillers. His books for young adults have featured the inhabitants of a coastal town battling a monumental malevolence with the help of its last supernatural guardian (The Witching Legacy), a diminutive race of Werglers (shape shifters) pitched against the evil might of the faerie hordes (The Hagwood Trilogy), a sinister "world-switching" dystopian future, triggered by a sinister and hypnotic book (Dancing Jax), Norse Fates, Glastonbury crow-demons and a time travelling, wise-cracking teddy bear. (The Wyrd Museum series), dark powers, a forgotten race and ancient evils on the North Yorkshire coast (The Whitby Witches trilogy), epic medieval adventure (The Oaken Throne) and science-fiction dramatising the "nefarious intrigue" within an alternate Tudor realm, peopled by personalities of the time, automata servants and animals known as Mechanicals and ruled by Queen Elizabeth I. (Deathscent).

Jarvis' books for younger readers have featured anthropomorphic rodents and small mammals – especially mice - as featured in the Deptford Mice series. A number of his works are based in London, in and around Deptford and Greenwich where he used to live, Felixstowe, or in Whitby, the setting for The Whitby Witches trilogy and his latest series: The Witching Legacy.His first novel – The Dark Portal, featuring the popular Deptford Mice – was the runner up for the Smarties book prize in 1989. His work has been described as "genre Busting" and "original, spooky, unusual, psychological supernatural horror fantasy with a very modern twist". Jarvis has said that he is not a writer of horror fiction, however his work has also been compared to that of "…Stephen King, but for Young Adults." The Deptford Mice was adapted and dramatized by Tiny Dog Productions, and staged in January 2010 and April 2011.

== Biography ==
Jarvis was born in Liverpool, the youngest of four children, and grew up in Warrington, attending Penketh High School. His favorite subjects at school were Art and English and he went on to study Graphic Design at Newcastle Polytechnic (now Northumbria University). After college, he moved to London and worked in the television and advertising industries as a model-maker. He lives in Greenwich in southeast London.

== Bibliography ==
=== The Witching Legacy ===
The Power of Dark (June 2016)
The Devil's Paintbox (March 2017)
Time of Blood (July 2017)
Legacy of Witches (April 2021)

The Witching Legacy is a four title series published by Egmont Books, in which Jarvis returns to the North Yorkshire town of Whitby. Jarvis said in a 2015 press release. "Now the time is right to climb those 199 steps once more and discover what’s been happening. Gasp – very grave and Dark things…" He further said of the town "The place won't leave me alone, it compels stories out of me. It's such a perfect blend of every location you could want, with a fabulously rich history that stretches back over a thousand years."

The Power of Dark follows the story of two friends who get caught up in a supernatural vendetta from the past. "Something is brewing in the town of Whitby. To best friends Lil and Verne, it just seems like a particularly bad storm, but Cherry Cerise, the last of the Whitby witches, fears that ancient forces are at work, reviving the curse of a long lost magical artifact."

The Devil's Paintbox continues the adventures of Lil when "More than ever she needs the support of best friend Verne and the witch Cherry Cerise, but they are preoccupied by their attempts to uncover more secrets of the golden Nimius. When Lil finds an antique box of watercolour paints she welcomes the diversion, little realising that every time she uses it something nasty escapes. But it is while they are distracted an old enemy finds a path to their door . . ."

Time of Blood In this third title, the sinister Mister Dark is more powerful than ever and has enslaved young Verne to his will. Can Lil save her best friend before their enemy unleashes his most audacious and insane plan yet? Even with the help of new, surprising allies - a witch, a mysterious man of many disguises and the secretive aufwaders beneath the cliff - all seems hopeless. Whitby has never been a more frightening and dangerous place to live, and the murdered dead refuse to rest in peace.

=== The Whitby Witches Trilogy ===
The Whitby Witches (Originally published 1991) (Re-published as an Egmont Modern Classic 2017,"...and the inspiration for The Power of Dark and its sequels.")
A Warlock in Whitby (1992)
The Whitby Child (1994)

=== The Hagwood Trilogy ===
Thorn Ogres of Hagwood (1999) (Re-published December 2012) (eBook and print on demand)
Dark Waters of Hagwood (June 2013) (eBook and print on demand)
War in Hagwood (July 2016) (eBook and print on demand)

Originally published by Puffin Books, Thorn Ogres of Hagwood has been published online by Open Road Integrated Media. The sequel Dark Waters of Hagwood was published in June 2013, and the series finale; War in Hagwood in July 2016.

After the original publication of the first instalment, the long-awaited second and third books were finally published over ten years later.

The series follows the heroic battle for survival of a peace-loving race of Werlings who have the power to Wergle or shape shift. Living an untroubled existence, they unwittingly become embroiled in an epic struggle against the mighty powers of dark faerie magic and the least likely champion must find the hero within.

The first title in the series has been described as "Fun for Hobbit-addicts and Potter-philes of all ages."

=== Dancing Jax ===
Dancing Jax (February 2011)
Freax and Rejex (February 2012)
Fighting Pax (July 2014)

The Dancing Jax trilogy is a dark fantasy series for Young Adults, published in the United Kingdom by HarperCollins. Jarvis has said the series was inspired by a dream. "...it gave me everything I needed, the title of the book, the characters and their names and other key 'ingredients'".

The series relates the hypnotic and destructive power held over its readers by a devilish book, originally written in the 1930s by an evil magician. The book acts as a gateway to Mooncaster, "a fairytale world, full of Jacks, Queens and Kings, unicorns and wolves", but further described as "No fairytale", and by the author himself as "Not for the faint-hearted".

The book explores themes of Many-worlds interpretation, Popular culture, Dystopia and Fear conditioning.

The first, second, and third volumes of the trilogy have been published in Germany by Script5.

=== Tales from the Wyrd Museum ===
The Woven Path (1995) (Re-published July 2011)
The Raven's Knot (1996) (Re-published October 2011)
The Fatal Strand (1998) (Re-published February 2012)

=== The Deptford Mice ===
The Deptford Mice Trilogy
The Dark Portal (1989) (Re-published May 2012) (eBook edition)
The Crystal Prison (1989) (Re-published May 2012) (eBook edition)
The Final Reckoning (1990) (Re-published May 2012) (eBook edition)

The Deptford Histories
The Alchymist's Cat (1991)
The Oaken Throne (1993)
Thomas (1995)

The Deptford Mice Almanack (1997)

The Deptford Mouselets
Fleabee's Fortune (2004)
Whortle's Hope (2007)

The Deptford Mouselets are a series of stand-alone prequel novels for younger children, featuring characters from The Deptford Mice and The Deptford Histories series.

=== Intrigues of the Reflected Realm ===
Deathscent (2001)
