= The Alchymist's Cat =

1991 novel by Robin Jarvis

- First edition cover
- Author: Robin Jarvis
- Language: English
- Series: The Deptford Histories
- Genre: Fantasy
- Publisher: Macdonald Young Books
- Publication date: 1991
- Publication place: United Kingdom
- Media type: Print (Hardcover & Paperback)
- Pages: 320
- ISBN: 0-7500-0889-X
- OCLC: 28800221

The Alchymist's Cat is a dark fantasy novel for children by British author Robin Jarvis. It is the first book in The Deptford Histories trilogy, a series of prequels to Jarvis's Deptford Mice books. Set in 17th century London, it serves as a backstory for the original trilogy's main antagonist, Jupiter. It was first published in the United Kingdom in 1991 by Macdonald Young Books. In 2004, it was published in the United States by Chronicle Books as The Alchemist's Cat.

== Synopsis ==
In London in 1664, an orange tabby cat named Imelza encounters a black cat she comes to call Master Midnight. When asked his real name, he identifies himself only as Imp. Imelza is seduced by him, and he impregnates her that night.

Shortly after his entire family dies of smallpox, young Will Godwin of the town of Adcombe is invited to London by an uncle he has never met. He asks his neighbour, John Balker the miller, to accompany him there. Despite the older man's misgivings and concerns for Will's safety, he agrees to do so. Will's first night in London is disastrous. He and Mr. Balker are told that Will's uncle will meet them at a seedy tavern called the Sickle Moon, but he fails to show up. The miller becomes drunk and as Will is leading him from the establishment, the two are attacked by a pair of ruffians. They murder Mr. Balker, but before they can turn their attention to Will, a man appears and scares them away by a show of what seems to be magic. The man introduces himself to Will as an apothecary named Elias Theophrastus Spittle. He hides Will in his shop before convincing the gathering crowd outside that it was the lad who killed Mr. Balker. Will tries to protest, but Spittle says that it would be wiser for him to remain silent, lest he incur the wrath of the mob. Now a fugitive, Will has no choice but to become the apothecary's servant to ensure his silence. Partly for disguise and partly to demean him, Spittle cuts the boy's hair short. When Will attempts to climb the stairs to the apothecary's private quarters, he is immediately shooed away and told never to go there again. Still, he is intrigued by the crimson-painted door. While Spittle is away, Will takes the opportunity to explore the upper floor, and finds a room filled with the paraphernalia of a wizard. The apothecary catches him and is about to severely punish him when Will offers his assistance in gathering whatever magical ingredients the man might need. Spittle is pacified, and when Will asks if he is a wizard, he says that though he has studied the black arts, he is an alchemist rather than any sort of magician. It is his goal to find the Philosopher's Stone.

One night, Spittle sends Will out to fetch the hair of a hanged man. He is successful but gets the attention of the night watchman. Forced to flee, he takes refuge in the graveyard of the church of St. Anne. Suddenly, a series of howls pierce the night, frightening off the pursuing night watchman. Will follows the source of the sound and finds Imelza, having given birth to a litter of kittens. She and her small family are half-dead with cold and starvation. Taking pity on them, Will carries them back to Spittle's apothecary shop. In order to be allowed to keep them, Will persuades Spittle to make one of the cats his familiar. Spittle chooses Jupiter, a strong and healthy ginger tabby, whom he trains in the magic arts. However, Spittle hates the ugly black runt, and names him Leech out of spite. Spittle has no interest in the tortoiseshell female, whom Will calls Dab. Due to Spittle favouring his brother, Leech becomes murderously envious of him. Spittle takes Will and his new familiar to St. Anne's cemetery to call forth the spirit of a wizard from the previous century, Magnus Augustus Zachaire, to aid him in his search for the Philosopher's Stone. Zachaire's spirit does appear but is angry at being disturbed and wishes to return to his grave. Spittle, however, traps him in a bottle which he carries back to the shop. Unwilling to help Spittle before, the furious Zachaire now absolutely refuses to do so, but Spittle says he will not release him until he finds the Stone. Leech discovers Zachaire's bottle and the two begin to secretly converse with each other. During these talks, Zachaire informs Leech that the latter cannot use any spells because Jupiter has already assumed the role of magic user in his family. The spirit also foresees a future where Jupiter will attain godhood as "Lord of All", which infuriates Leech. However, if Jupiter were to die, his powers would pass to his brother.

The Bubonic plague begins and spreads throughout London. Although Imelza and Dab escape from Spittle, Imelza is beaten to death by a frightened mob blaming animals for the spread of the plague. Will's friend Molly, working as a plague doctor, saves Dab from near death. When Dab returns home, Spittle takes her away and murders her in the night for an anatomical experiment. Leech is the only witness to Dab's abduction but refused to help her due to her having called specifically for Jupiter's aid rather than his. Jupiter and Leech battle over who is heir to the black arts. When Zachaire reveals to Spittle that he lengthened his lifespan through a magic potion called the Elixir of Life, Spittle puts his quest for the Philosopher's Stone on hold in favour of recreating it instead. This potion renders the drinker essentially immortal save for two Achilles heels: fire and water. When Spittle succumbs to the plague and dies, Jupiter reveals his ability to talk to Will and the two finish the alchemist's work on the Elixir of Life to resurrect him. It is at this point that Will learns that Spittle is in fact his uncle, who lured him to London to take his inheritance. Spittle tries to murder Will, and Jupiter is at first hesitant to stop him as he doesn't want to betray his master. But when he discovers his sister Dab's preserved corpse, he is filled with rage and drinks the potion himself, turning on Spittle. He has a magical duel with Spittle and a fire breaks out. Using the power of the Elixir of Life, Zachaire summons his skeleton from the grave and becomes human again. He and Spittle put aside their differences and are about to escape the burning shop when Zachaire suddenly changes his mind. Wanting to die once more, he drags Spittle into the fire with him. Leech betrays Jupiter and leaves him to burn to death, inheriting his brother's magic powers. Leech then falls into the fire himself. Will escapes the burning capital city with Molly, who turns out to have been John Balker's estranged daughter. The two of them make plans to return to Adcombe. Will reveals that he has rescued one of the cats, so terribly burned that it is impossible to tell which it is. Later, the cat is revealed to be Leech. Having drunk the Elixir of Life as well as a hair tonic that changes his sable fur to ginger, Leech convinces a rat once kept by Spittle to lead him to the sewers. Leech takes his brother's name and title as his own: "Jupiter, Lord of All".

== Background ==
Jarvis chose the setting of The Alchymist's Cat from reading the diaries of Samuel Pepys and said he "spent ages revelling in the research. Plague and the Great Fire - I couldn't wish for a better backdrop!" He imagined the character Dr. Spittle to appear similar to comic actor Alastair Sim. However, when creating the first edition's cover painting, Jarvis used his barber as a reference. He says the scene where Spittle cuts Will's hair was included as a nod to him.

== Reception ==
Sally Estes of Booklist called the novel a "creepy, atmospheric horror tale" and a "vivid tale of treachery, cruelty, and sorcery, leavened only by Will's innate goodness." Kirkus Reviews called it "a crackerjack creepfest" and added that "Jarvis's florid, purple-tinged prose presents London--with her filthy alleys and crime-ridden alehouses, her overgrown cemeteries and plague-haunted streets--as a major player in the unfolding disaster. Meanwhile, ghastly revelations pile upon grisly tableaus as the plot hurtles towards a spectacular final conflagration amidst London's Great Fire." Christine McGinty of School Library Journal said "The book is filled with adventure, suspense, and a feeling of dread. However, parts of it move very slowly, particularly in the beginning. Still, Jarvis closes with an unexpected cliff-hanger that will have readers craving more books about Jupiter."

== Unproduced film adaptation ==
In late 2004, Robin Jarvis announced on his website that a film adaptation of The Alchymist's Cat was to be made the following year. The script would be written by Richard Carpenter. Jarvis found it a "fantastically exciting prospect" and added that "the actors that are being mentioned in connection with it are the best around." However, no further updates were ever given about the project, and it can be assumed that it was ultimately scrapped for reasons unknown. Carpenter died in 2012.
