= The Crystal Prison =

Novel by Robin Jarvis

- First edition cover
- Author: Robin Jarvis
- Language: English
- Series: The Deptford Mice
- Genre: Dark fantasy
- Publisher: Macdonald & Company
- Publication date: 1989
- Publication place: United Kingdom
- Media type: Print (Hardcover & Paperback)
- ISBN: 1-58717-107-4
- Preceded by: The Dark Portal
- Followed by: The Final Reckoning

The Crystal Prison is a dark fantasy novel for children by British author Robin Jarvis. It is the second book in The Deptford Mice trilogy, first published in the United Kingdom in 1989 by Macdonald & Company, London. In 2001, it was published by SeaStar Books in the United States. The book continues the story of the young house mouse Audrey after she and her friends have defeated the evil cat Jupiter, lord of the sewer rats.

== Plot ==
The story picks up shortly after the last book left off. Albino mouse Oswald Chitter is deathly ill, having caught an infection during his time in the Deptford sewers battling the villainous cat Jupiter with his friends. In caring for him, Oswald's parents have become sick as well. They are now being tended to by their friends the Browns, city mouse Piccadilly, and Oswald's fieldmouse cousin Twit. Midshipmouse Thomas Triton arrives with news that the Starwife, the wise and ancient queen of the squirrels, has summoned Audrey to her chambers so she can hear the story of Jupiter's downfall firsthand. While there, the Starwife reveals the main reason for summoning Audrey: the rat Madame Akkikuyu was found wandering aimlessly in Greenwich Park by her sentries. A phony fortune teller who once served Jupiter, Akkikuyu lost her mind when she discovered he was a cat. Now she is harmless, and the Starwife believes it best if Audrey, whom Akkikuyu considers her close friend, accompanies the rat to Twit's home of Fennywolde, a rural field. There she can live out her days in peace and happiness. Audrey is horrified when she learns she is to stay with Akkikuyu for the rest of the rat's life. She has no choice in the matter when the Starwife uses her magic to create a medicine to heal Oswald that will only work if Audrey agrees to the bargain. Oswald and his parents recover and there is a celebration, but Audrey is too depressed to join in.

Upon her arrival in Fennywolde, Akkikuyu immediately gains the respect of the inhabitants by saving the lives of two fieldmouse children and chasing off the owl who attacked them. Now able to move from their winter quarters and into the field again, the fieldmice build the Hall of Corn, an immense structure made from corn stalks. To celebrate its opening, Audrey creates a corn dolly as a gift to the fieldmice. But country beauty Alison Sedge, jealous of the town mouse's popularity, informs the strict religious fundamentalist Isaac Nettle, who denounces the doll as blasphemy to the Green Mouse deity and tosses it away. Meanwhile, Akkikuyu is haunted by a voice calling her name and discovers that it is a spirit named Nicodemus animating a tattooed face on her ear. He says he is trapped in limbo and needs her help in freeing him. In return he promises her magic powers. To convince her he is telling the truth, Nicodemus brings the discarded corn dolly to life. Multiple fieldmice turn up dead, and the Fennywolders begin to suspect Audrey as Isaac continues to vilify her. Nicodemus explains to Akkikuyu that to free him from the other side, a ritual must take place in which a female will be sacrificed. Audrey is the one he has in mind, to Akkikuyu's dismay. When the fieldmice discover that Audrey's animated corn dolly is the murderer, they want to hang her as a witch. But Twit invokes the Gallows Law, which states that if the accused can find a willing spouse, they cannot be hanged. He offers to marry Audrey, and she accepts only to save her life. Audrey is now under the protection of the Green Mouse, and thus unable to be sacrificed by Nicodemus. However, Akkikuyu suggests that Alison would be the perfect substitute.

Akkikuyu lures Alison into the ritual circle by saying she will cast a spell against Audrey. Alison soon finds out differently and midway through the ceremony, Akkikuyu herself learns she has been tricked as she sees she is turning into a cat. Nicodemus is revealed as the spirit of Jupiter, who plans to inhabit her body. Horrified, Akkikuyu leaps into the bonfire to free herself from Jupiter's control and burns to death. Alison escapes and Jupiter is left trapped inside Akkikuyu's crystal ball, where he transferred his soul temporarily during the ritual. The fire spreads throughout Fennywolde and it takes many days to be put under control. Having learned the truth, the Fennywolders realise they misjudged Audrey. Now that Akkikuyu is dead, she is free to return home, although Twit stays behind to help rebuild Fennywolde. Some time later, Alison, driven mad with grief and hatred, finds Akkikuyu's charred crystal ball. Cursing Audrey, she tosses the globe away. It smashes and Jupiter is released to wreak vengeance on his enemies.

== Background ==
Jarvis has said he based Fennywolde on the fields of a farm he played in as a child: "Everything in the book was there, the meadow, the ditch and the pool surrounded by trees. It was a perfect setting for the mice's second adventure and made a refreshing change from the sewers." For The Crystal Prison he "wanted a change of pace, slowly building up an atmosphere of tension and fear. [Jarvis] was particularly pleased with the murderer...who lurked in the cornfield."

== Reception ==
Sally Estes of Booklist said that The Crystal Prison "lacks the power of its predecessor, but it still stands up well as a foreboding bridge to the trilogy's concluding volume." According to Eva Mitnick of School Library Journal, "Although this book stands on its own, readers who aren't familiar with the first volume might become impatient with the first section, which introduces a multitude of characters and moves slowly, impeded by old-fashioned, florid prose. The pace picks up in the countryside, where an ever-hungry owl and the mysterious spirit bring menace and tragedy to the close-knit community of field mice who live there, and the final chapters are breathtakingly thrilling. Some literal-minded readers may wonder how a mouse could stride or possess a waist and long flowing hair, but fans of Brian Jacques's Redwall series (Philomel) and Avi's Tales from Dimwood Forest series (HarperCollins) will likely relish this tale."
