= The Final Reckoning =

1990 novel by Robin Jarvis

- Author: Robin Jarvis
- Language: English
- Series: The Deptford Mice
- Genre: Dark fantasy
- Publisher: Macdonald & Company
- Publication date: 1990
- Publication place: United Kingdom
- Media type: Print (Hardcover & Paperback)
- Pages: 305 pp
- ISBN: 0-7500-0272-7
- OCLC: 31710682
- Preceded by: The Crystal Prison
- Followed by: The Alchymist's Cat

The Final Reckoning is a dark fantasy novel for children by British author Robin Jarvis. It is the third and the final book in The Deptford Mice trilogy, first published in the United Kingdom in 1990 by Macdonald & Company, London. In 2002, it was published by SeaStar Books in the United States. The book continues the story of the young house mouse Audrey and her friends as they attempt to banish the spirit of the evil cat Jupiter once and for all.

== Plot summary ==
It is winter and Yule festivities are underway in the Skirtings, the mouse community of the old empty house in Deptford. The Brown siblings, Arthur and Audrey, have returned from their disastrous stay in Fennywolde where, to prevent her being hanged as a witch, the latter was married to Twit. Several troubling events begin to occur: the psychic bats leave the house's attic, the Starwife's magical Starglass is stolen, and there are reports of a bloodthirsty rat army growing in the city. The Deptford mice soon reach the horrifying conclusion that the spirit of Jupiter has returned to seek revenge by smothering the world in eternal winter, and they have no idea how to defeat him this time as he is already dead.

The city rats, now led by Jupiter's former lieutenant Morgan (who survived his fall into the sewer water at the end of the first book), prepare to go to Deptford and slaughter all the mice there. But Jupiter appears to Morgan and once again ensnares him into his service. Lured to his master's base, the Deptford Power Station, Morgan is confused and horrified when all his rats are immediately murdered by Jupiter on their arrival. Piccadilly, Thomas, and Arthur go to the power station hoping that they can vanquish Jupiter by using Audrey's mousebrass charm, which is what worked last time. It is now in the possession of Morgan, who battles Piccadilly in a one-on-one duel but ultimately decides to commit suicide to free himself from Jupiter's control. When Piccadilly uses the mousebrass against Jupiter, he finds that the cat spectre is too powerful to be harmed by it now. The city mouse is surrounded and killed by the ghosts of Morgan's rats, returned from the dead as an invincible army wielding ice spears.

Thomas, wounded by an ice spear, is brought to the Skirtings by Arthur. Though reluctant as she assumes everyone will soon die anyway, the Starwife agrees to help Thomas, but only if Audrey assists her. With her magical silver acorn pendant, the Starwife casts the healing spell while simultaneously performing a ritual to transfer her powers to the unsuspecting Audrey. When Audrey learns she is now the new Starwife whether she likes it or not, she reacts in fury, tossing the pendant away. The former Starwife goes out into the yard where she prepares to sacrifice herself as part of a final plan to defeat Jupiter. Her frozen body is discovered the next morning and burned in a funeral pyre as she wished. Shortly afterward, a banging is heard on the front door of the empty house, which turns out to be a horde of Jupiter's ghostly rats trying to get in. Quickly, all the mice escape through the sewers to the Cutty Sark with Thomas, but Audrey hears a voice in her head compelling her to return to the garden. In spite of protests, she does so and finds a single snowdrop flower in the remains of the Starwife's pyre.

Audrey makes her way to the Greenwich Observatory, where she finally confronts Jupiter, throwing the snowdrop flower at him, which causes him terrific agony. He drops the Starglass and it shatters. Consumed by blistering green flames, Jupiter is sent to the void to be tormented by spring eternally. All the rat ghosts disappear as well. The frozen world begins to thaw and a beautiful spring day begins. The Green Mouse appears and thanks Audrey for releasing him. He also presides over the union of her mother Gwen and Thomas Triton, who have grown close. After some weeks, Arthur and a few other mice go to the old empty house in Deptford. The damage from Jupiter's ghosts cannot be repaired, however, and they return to live on the Cutty Sark with Thomas. Audrey, who accompanied them, searches until she finds the discarded silver acorn pendant. Taking leave of her family, she travels to Greenwich where she finally accepts her role as the new Starwife.

== Background ==
According to Jarvis, "After the unfolding drama of the previous story I knew this one had to have a powerful beginning which dragged the reader onto a roller coaster ride that did not let up until the very last page." Several parts of the Holeborn scenes were cut from the finished book due to issues of space, which Jarvis considered "a great pity as there were some old campaigners in the missing pieces who I was very fond of."

Just before he began writing the book, Jarvis invested in a typewriter. As he had previously written everything long hand, this made things much easier for him and his novels would subsequently increase in length.

== Reception ==
The Final Reckoning was called "a humdinger of a tale" by Sally Estes of Booklist, with "a poignant denouement that will satisfy the trilogy's fans." Kirkus Reviews also praised the book, saying it was a "superlative conclusion to a top-notch series." Charlotte Decker of Library Media Connection gave a positive review where she described The Final Reckoning as being "packed with action as the rats once again come under Jupiter's evil will and wage war upon the mice. As this is the last in the series, readers new to the books may have trouble keeping characters straight but there is enough information about events from the previous titles to allow them to enjoy the story."
