= The Deptford Mice =

Book by Robin Jarvis

- Box set cover
- The Dark Portal (1989); The Crystal Prison (1989); The Final Reckoning (1990)
- Author: Robin Jarvis
- Illustrator: Robin Jarvis
- Country: United Kingdom
- Language: English
- Genre: Children's, Dark fantasy
- Publisher: Macdonald & Company; Simon & Schuster; Hodder Children's Books; Pushkin Children's Books (UK) SeaStar Books (USA) Acorn Independent Press (e-books)
- Media type: Print (Hardback & Paperback); Audiobook; E-book

The Deptford Mice is a trilogy of children's dark fantasy novels by British author Robin Jarvis. The first book, The Dark Portal, was published in 1989 by Macdonald & Company in London, followed that same year by The Crystal Prison and then The Final Reckoning in 1990. The trilogy tells the story of a young mouse girl named Audrey Brown and her friends as they fight Jupiter, the evil living god of the sewer rats in the London borough of Deptford.

The first book in the series, The Dark Portal, was a runner-up for the Smarties book prize in 1989. In 2000, The Deptford Mice trilogy made its debut in the United States with the publication of The Dark Portal by SeaStar Books. The Crystal Prison and The Final Reckoning were published there in 2001 and 2002 respectively.

In November 2023, it was announced that Pushkin Children's Books had acquired worldwide publishing rights to The Deptford Mice and would be reissuing the trilogy throughout 2024. These editions are "freshly edited" and feature new covers and illustrations by Jarvis.

== Development ==
Jarvis came up with the idea for The Deptford Mice while working as a model-maker for television programmes and commercials. He had been designing a big, furry alien but decided to take a break and draw something small. That something was a mouse who would become the character Oswald Chitter. Jarvis continued to doodle mice, and when a friend of his saw the sketches, he suggested they be sent to a publisher. The publisher responded positively and asked if there was a story to accompany the drawings. At the time there wasn't one, but Jarvis then wrote the story of The Deptford Mice. He had originally envisioned it as a picture book, but it became a 70,000 word manuscript. When Jarvis's editor told him that the manuscript could make a trilogy due to its long length, he went away and cut it, and then came up with more ideas for the second and third books. The entire storyline of the trilogy was worked out by Jarvis before he sat down to write it. This meant that he knew the ultimate fates of all the characters from the beginning and was able to easily insert foreshadowing. Some of the real history and lore of Greenwich and Blackheath was incorporated by Jarvis into the novels because he believes "that if you can incorporate elements of documented history into fantasy, this will hopefully enhance the experience for the reader and make it more convincing."

== Trilogy ==
=== The Dark Portal ===
A community of mice lives an idyllic existence in an old empty house in the London borough Deptford. The only problem they have is a fear of the vicious rats in the sewers below who worship a mysterious living god called Jupiter. One mouse named Albert Brown is drawn into the sewers by dark enchantments on the grill in the house's basement. His daughter Audrey, refusing to believe he is dead, sets out to find him and in the process discover the truth about the villainous Jupiter.

=== The Crystal Prison ===
Audrey is commanded by the Starwife, all-powerful queen of the squirrels, to accompany the rat Madame Akkikuyu to the countryside against her will. Formerly in the service of the now-defeated Jupiter, Akkikuyu has gone mad and is completely harmless. Her only wish is to find peace and happiness. But as soon as she and Audrey arrive in the country, fieldmice start turning up dead. Audrey unwittingly becomes the main suspect, but little does anyone know, the dark events are stemming from an evil spirit who is manipulating Akkikuyu.

=== The Final Reckoning ===
In the final book of the trilogy, Jupiter returns in spectral form, vowing revenge on the mice who destroyed his mortal body. More powerful than ever, he smothers the world in an eternal winter and gathers together a seemingly invincible army of ice spear-wielding ghost rats. The mice of Deptford are at a loss as to how to vanquish him this second time because he is already dead. Worse still, their ally the Starwife has had her realm destroyed and her magical Starglass stolen by Jupiter, who plans to use it to blot out the sun and bring an end to all life on earth.

== Other books ==
Jarvis has also written prequels to The Deptford Mice. These include The Deptford Histories trilogy, which delves into the backstories of major characters like Jupiter and Thomas Triton, and The Deptford Mouselets, intended to introduce younger children to The Deptford Mice. The Mouselets stories are much more lighthearted in tone, with little to no violence, and the books are not nearly as long as those in the main trilogies. The Deptford Mice Almanack, written from an in-universe perspective, has also been released to complement the novels. It describes the fictional traditions and lore of the animal characters, as well as events taking place ten years after The Deptford Mice trilogy. The Deptford Mice Almanack ends with an ominous cliffhanger, and Jarvis has stated that he plans to write "one more, final Deptford Mice book. It will be set some years after the events of The Final Reckoning and is going to be the most frightening story of them all. I can't wait to get started on that one. All I can say about it is that the peril-o-meter will be in the red zone all the way, so expect lots of desperate battles and more than a few tears, because at long last, after all these years of imprisonment, the evil Lord Hobb is back. The Three Thrones of the terrifying ancient rat gods will rise again..."

== Adaptations ==
=== Audiobook ===
In 1995, Macdonald Young Books released abridged readings of the three novels on cassette tape. The Dark Portal was narrated by Tom Baker, The Crystal Prison by Martin Shaw, and The Final Reckoning by Jon Pertwee. These were later reissued in 2001 by Hodder Headline to coincide with their new Hodder Silver print editions of the books.

Shortly after The Deptford Mice's first publication in the United States, Blackstone Audio released unabridged audiobooks on cassette, compact disc, and digital formats in an arrangement with NorthSouth Books. Roe Kendall narrated the entire trilogy.

=== Cancelled film ===
In the mid-1990s, there were plans for Jim Henson Pictures to adapt The Deptford Mice into a film. The project was ultimately abandoned for reasons unknown.

=== Stage ===
In 2010, London-based theatre company Tiny Dog Productions created the first official stage production of The Dark Portal under licence from Robin Jarvis. After successful preview showings at The Space Theatre, London.; the production was again performed in April 2011 at the New Wimbledon Theatre.
