= Pat Costello (actor) =

American actor, producer, stunt double and the brother of Lou Costello

- Born: Anthony Sebastian Cristillo; December 10, 1902; Paterson, New Jersey, U.S.
- Died: September 13, 1990 (aged 87); Encino, California, U.S.
- Occupations: Actor, producer, stunt double
- Years active: 1941–1966
- Spouse: Mary Costello
- Family: Lou Costello (brother)

Anthony Sebastian Cristillo (December 10, 1902 – September 13, 1990), professionally known as Pat Costello, was an American actor, producer, stunt double and brother of comedian Lou Costello. He is credited as the executive producer for the American television sitcom The Abbott and Costello Show.

== Early life ==
Costello was born in Paterson, New Jersey to Sebastiano Cristillo and Helen Rege. He served in the army during World War I and played the saxophone for bandleader Paul Whiteman as well as his own orchestra.

== Career ==
Costello started his career as an actor in the 1941 Abbott and Costello film Buck Privates. He also served as his brother's stunt double on the first ten Abbott and Costello films.

In 1959, after Lou Costello died of a heart attack, Pat retired from show business.

In 1966, Costello had a bit role in the Jerry Lewis film Three on a Couch.

== Death ==
Costello died in September 1990 of heart failure at his home in Encino, California, at the age of 87.

== Filmography ==
=== Acting and stunt double work ===
Year	Title	Role	Notes
1941	Buck Privates	Recruit Who Slugs Herbie	Actor & Stunt Double (uncredited)
1941	Bowery Blitzkrieg	Trainer	Actor
1941	In the Navy		Stunt Double (uncredited)
1941	Hold That Ghost		Stunt Double (uncredited)
1941	Sing Another Chorus	Actor	Actor (uncredited)
1941	Keep 'Em Flying		Stunt Double (uncredited)
1941	Mob Town	Bit Part	Actor (uncredited)
1941	Spooks Run Wild	Bus Driver	Actor (uncredited)
1942	Jail House Blues	Flute Player	Actor & Stunt Double (uncredited)
1942	The Corpse Vanishes	Attendant at Alice's Wedding	Actor (uncredited)
1942	Ride 'Em Cowboy		Stunt Double (uncredited)
1942	Rio Rita		Stunt Double (uncredited)
1942	Let's Get Tough!	Navy Recruiter	Actor (uncredited)
1942	Who Done It?		Stunt Double (uncredited)
1942	Bowery at Midnight	Tramp Questioned by Richard	Actor (uncredited)
1942	The Payoff	Pat - Reporter	Actor
1942	Madame Spy	Taxicab Driver	Actor (uncredited)
1943	It Ain't Hay		Stunt Double (uncredited)
1944	Million Dollar Kid	Spike	Actor
1945	Here Come the Co-Eds		Stunt Double (uncredited)
1945	The Naughty Nineties		Stunt Double (uncredited)
1946	Little Giant	Costumer	Actor & Stunt Double (uncredited)
1946	The Brute Man	Car 22 Patrolman	Actor (uncredited)
1948	Mexican Hayride	Tim Williams	Actor
1959	The 30 Foot Bride of Candy Rock		Stunt Double (uncredited)
1966	Three on a Couch	Black Suit Man at Party	Actor (uncredited)

=== Producing work ===
Year	Title	Notes
1952	Jack and the Beanstalk	Executive Producer (Film)
1952-1954	The Abbott and Costello Show	Executive Producer - 51 Episodes
1953	I'm the Law	Executive Producer - 27 Episodes
