= Joe Kirk =

American actor (1903–1975)

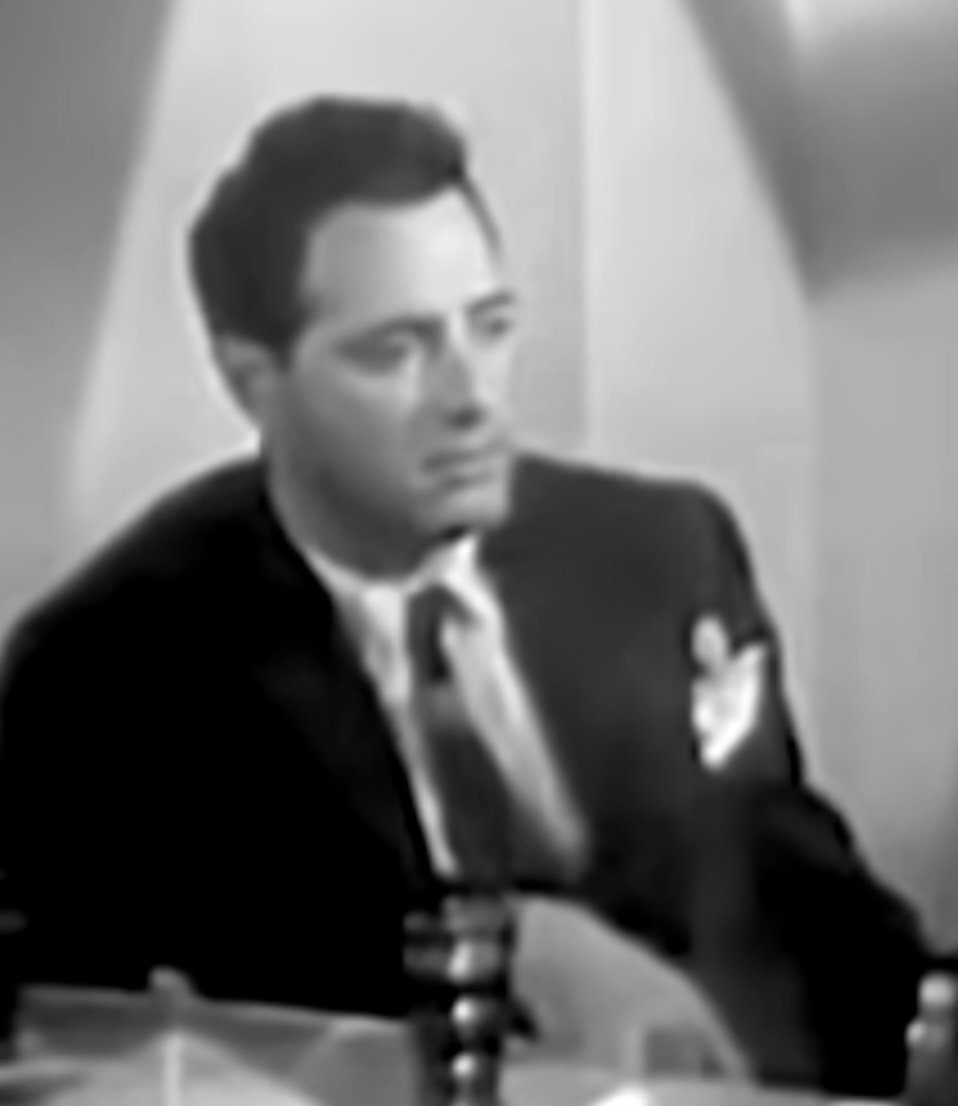
- Kirk in X Marks the Spot (1942)
- Born: Ignazio Curcuruto; October 1, 1903; New York City, U.S.
- Died: April 16, 1975 (aged 71); Los Angeles, California, U.S.
- Resting place: Forest Lawn Memorial Park, Los Angeles
- Occupation: Actor
- Years active: 1930s–1958
- Known for: Mr. Bacciagalupe
- Notable work: The Abbott and Costello Show
- Spouses: Marie Katherine Cristillo (div. 1953) Elizabeth Joan Walker (before 1975)
- Children: 2
- Relatives: Lou Costello (brother-in-law)

Ignazio "Nat" Curcuruto (October 1, 1903 – April 16, 1975), better known by his stage name Joe Kirk, was an American radio, film, and television actor who was best known for playing the role of Mr. Bacciagalupe on The Abbott and Costello Show. He was married to Lou Costello's sister, Marie, in real life.

== Early life and career ==
Kirk was born Ignazio Curcuruto (known as Nat to his family) in New York City, one of four children—Letitia, Philip (1902–95), Nat (1903–75) and Josephine—of Italian immigrants from Sicily, Giuseppe "Joe" Curcuruto and Elvira Puglisi Curcuruto (1882–1977).

He got his professional start in vaudeville, where he worked as a master of ceremonies and a comedian during the 1930s.

== Radio career ==
Kirk was a regular supporting player on Abbott and Costello's radio show during World War II and the postwar era of the 1940s. He was heard in various bit parts, including in a recurring closing gag as an audience member who heckles Costello.

== Television career ==
Kirk played Mr. Bacciagalupe and others on the duo's appearances on The Colgate Comedy Hour and then on the television version of The Abbott and Costello Show. Kirk's friendly, mustachioed character held a variety of jobs. At various points in the show, he was a barber, grocer, fruit vendor, ice cream vendor, peanut vendor, bakery owner and music store salesman. As Mr. Bacciagalupe, Kirk spoke with a thick Sicilian-American accent; his surname as well was pronounced in the Sicilian manner and not in proper Italian. When excited, Mr. Bacciagalupe frequently made improvized asides in the Italian language. Lou Costello, who was Italian-American himself, also understood these side remarks, and sometimes broke character and laughed along as well.

In the episodes featuring his character, Mr. Bacciagalupe would often show impatience with the indecision portrayed by Lou Costello, whom he called by his Sicilian name, Luigi. As he "lost his temperature", Mr. Bacciagalupe would lapse into broken Italian phrases and increasingly animated gesticulation to express his frustration. Sometimes he would find his place of business wrecked by Abbott and Costello's antics; at other times he would confound them completely and they would retreat in confusion as he crowed in triumph.

Kirk's Mr. Bacciagalupe character appeared in 15 of the 26 episodes in the show's first season, 1952–53. In all, he appeared in 19 episodes of the show's 52 total episodes through its end in 1954.

== Film career ==
The bulk of Kirk's early film career consisted of playing bit parts, often uncredited, in low-budget productions. Typical roles for him were "ethnic" Sicilian-Americans – gangsters, bartenders, bookies and henchmen. He appeared in several films produced by low-budget studio Monogram Pictures, including Spooks Run Wild (1941), Mr. Wise Guy (1942) and Smart Alecks (1942). Kirk appeared as the villager Schwartz in Universal's House of Frankenstein (1944). He was occasionally billed as Joseph I. Kirk, the "I" standing for his birth-name, Ignazio.

Through his marriage to Marie Cristillo, the sister of Lou Costello, Kirk secured steady appearances (albeit in small roles) in Abbott and Costello films. His more prominent parts included the pet shop owner in Rio Rita (1942), Honest Dan the Bookie in Here Come the Co-Eds (1946), the shady real estate agent in Buck Privates Come Home (1947), an uncredited bystander in "Abbott and Costello Meet Frankenstein" (1948) and Dr. Orvilla in Abbott and Costello Go to Mars (1953).

Kirk continued acting through the late 1950s, with appearances in The Jackie Robinson Story (1950), the 1956 Bowery Boys comedy Hot Shots and Fritz Lang's drama Beyond a Reasonable Doubt (1956). He also took small roles in television shows such as Adventures of Superman, The Sheriff of Cochise and U.S. Marshal, before retiring from show business in 1958.

== Personal life ==
Kirk was married to Marie Katherine Cristillo (1912–88), who was the sister of Lou Costello and daughter of producer Sebastian Cristillo. After their marriage, Marie was known interchangeably as Marie Curcuruto or Marie Kirk. The couple had two sons.

He was the great-uncle of actress Marki Costello, who is the granddaughter of Lou Costello. Kirk was buried in Forest Lawn Memorial Park (Hollywood Hills).

== Filmography ==
Year	Title	Role	Notes
1941	Spooks Run Wild	Camp Counselor	Uncredited
1941	Dick Tracy vs. Crime, Inc.	Brownstone Heavy 3	Serial, Uncredited
1942	Mr. Wise Guy	Man in Newsreel with Prize Money	Uncredited
1942	Rio Rita	Pet Shop Owner	Uncredited, had a small cameo in this Abbott & Costello movie
1942	Smart Alecks	Mike	
1942	Pardon My Sarong	Henchman with Tabor	Uncredited
1942	Who Done It?	Harry – the Radio Technician	Uncredited
1942	X Marks the Spot	Henchman Jerry	
1942	Pittsburgh	Nightclub Bit Role	Uncredited
1942	Over My Dead Body	Sailor	
1943	Margin for Error	Officer Solomon	Uncredited
1943	Pistol Packin' Mama	Joe McGurn	
1944	Phantom Lady	Sanders – Stage Manager	Uncredited
1944	Sweethearts of the U.S.A.	Ghost of Napoleon	
1944	Moon Over Las Vegas	Ticket Taker	Uncredited
1944	Ghost Catchers	Mug	Uncredited
1944	Christmas Holiday	Airline Attendant	Uncredited
1944	Bowery to Broadway	Billboard Man	Uncredited
1944	The House of Frankenstein	Schwartz	Uncredited
1945	Here Come the Co-Eds	Honest Dan Murphy the Bookie	
1945	See My Lawyer	Bookie	Uncredited
1945	Blonde Ransom	Bender	
1945	The Naughty Nineties	Croupier	
1945	River Gang	Gangster	Uncredited
1946	Little Giant	Salesman	
1946	Smooth as Silk	Joe	Uncredited
1946	Inside Job	Fenway	Uncredited
1947	Buck Privates Come Home	Real Estate Salesman	
1947	The Web	Joe – Plainclothesman	Uncredited
1948	The Noose Hangs High	Gangster	Uncredited
1948	Abbott and Costello Meet Frankenstein	Man at Costume Party in Fez	Uncredited
1948	My Dear Secretary	Process Server with Divorce Papers	Uncredited
1948	Mexican Hayride	Second Businessman	Uncredited
1949	The Big Sombrero	Man With Cigar	Uncredited
1949	Impact	Hotel Clerk	
1949	Red Light	Reporter in Newsreel	Uncredited
1950	The Jackie Robinson Story	Tony	Uncredited
1951	Comin' Round the Mountain	Concession Stand Counterman	Uncredited
1952	Jack and the Beanstalk	Villager	Uncredited
1952	Lost in Alaska	Henchman	
1952	Abbott and Costello Meet Captain Kidd	Flirtatious Pirate	Uncredited
1952–1954	The Abbott and Costello Show	Mr. Bacciagalupe / Double Crossing Dan / Indian	19 episodes, played a major supporting role in the shows' first season
1953	The Mississippi Gambler	Onlooker at Poker Game	Uncredited
1953	Abbott and Costello Go to Mars	Dr. Orvilla	
1953	Fort Algiers	Luigi	
1954	The Long Wait	Servo's Hit Man	Uncredited
1955	Night Freight	Bartender	
1956	Beyond a Reasonable Doubt	Clothing Store Clerk	
1956	Hot Shots	Detective Adams – Arresting Officer	Uncredited
1957	Monkey on My Back	Fight Spectator	Uncredited
1957	Official Detective	Al the Bartender / Beck	TV series (US), 2 episodes
1965	I'll Take Sweden	Man in Bunny Costume	Uncredited, (final film role)
