= The Time of Their Lives =

1946 fantasy-comedy film

- Theatrical release poster
- Directed by: Charles Barton
- Written by: Walter DeLeon; Val Burton; Bradford Ropes; John Grant (additional dialogue)
- Produced by: Val Burton
- Starring: Bud Abbott; Lou Costello; Marjorie Reynolds; Gale Sondergaard; Binnie Barnes; John Shelton
- Cinematography: Charles Van Enger
- Edited by: Philip Cahn
- Music by: Milton Rosen
- Production company: Universal Pictures
- Distributed by: Universal Pictures
- Release date: August 16, 1946
- Running time: 82 minutes
- Country: United States
- Language: English
- Budget: $830,625

The Time of Their Lives is a 1946 American fantasy comedy film directed by Charles Barton and starring the comedic duo Abbott and Costello alongside Marjorie Reynolds, Gale Sondergaard and Binnie Barnes. It was produced and distributed by Universal Pictures.

== Plot ==
In 1780, master tinker Horatio Prim arrives at the Kings Point estate of Tom Danbury. Although Horatio has failed to raise enough money to buy Danbury's housemaid Nora O'Leary out of indentured servitude, he carries a letter of commendation from Gen. George Washington that he hopes will persuade Danbury to let them marry. Unfortunately, Horatio has a romantic rival in Danbury's devious butler, Cuthbert Greenway, who tries to prevent Horatio from presenting his letter. Nora, however, rushes off to show the letter to Danbury, but she inadvertently overhears Danbury discussing his part in Benedict Arnold's plot. Danbury seizes Nora and hides the letter in a secret compartment in the mantel clock. Danbury's fiancée, Melody Allen, standing outside the window, witnesses this betrayal and enlists Horatio's help to ride off and warn Washington's army. But American troops on their way to arrest Tom overrun the estate, loot it and set it ablaze. Melody and Horatio are mistakenly shot as traitors, and their bodies are cast into a well. Their souls are condemned to remain bound to the estate until their innocence can be proven.

For the next 166 years the ghosts of Horatio and Melody roam the grounds of the estate. In 1946, after the estate has been rebuilt and restored with much of its original furnishings, playwright Sheldon Gage invites his fiancée, June Prescott, her Aunt Millie, and his psychiatrist, Dr. Ralph Greenway, a descendant of Cuthbert, to spend the weekend.

They are greeted by the clairvoyant maid, Emily, who senses that the grounds are haunted. Ghosts Horatio and Melody have some fun with this idea and scare the guests in various ways — especially Greenway, whom Horatio at first mistakes for Cuthbert. Horatio and Melody also find themselves frightened by modern inventions like the electric light and the radio. These supernatural events prompt the newcomers to hold a séance led by Emily. From clues offered by Horatio, Melody and Tom's repentant spirit, they discern the identities of the ghosts and the existence of the letter which can free them.

The group searches for Horatio's letter, but the original mantel clock containing the letter is in a New York museum. Greenway, to atone for the misdeeds of his ancestor, goes to the museum to retrieve the letter. But when museum officials refuse to let him examine the clock, Greenway steals it. He arrives back at the estate where the state police are waiting for him. They arrest Greenway, but are prevented from taking him off the estate by the curse that binds Horatio and Melody to it. When the clock is finally opened and the letter is revealed, Melody and Horatio's innocence is proven and they are freed. Each is called to heaven by a loved one: Melody by Tom, and Horatio by Nora, who meets him at heaven's gate but points to a sign that reads, "Closed for Washington's Birthday". Horatio must wait one more day to get into heaven.

== Cast ==
- Bud Abbott as Cuthbert Greenway/Dr. Ralph Greenway
- Lou Costello as Horatio Prim
- Marjorie Reynolds as Melody Allen
- Binnie Barnes as Mildred Dean
- John Shelton as Sheldon Gage
- Gale Sondergaard as Emily
- Lynn Baggett as June Prescott
- Jess Barker as Thomas Danbury
- Ann Gillis as Nora O'Leary
- Donald MacBride as Lt. Mason
- William Hall as Sgt. Conners
- Robert Barrat as Maj. Putnam
- Rex Lease as Sgt. Makepeace
- Kirk Alyn as Dandy at Party
- Harry Brown as Second Sergeant
- George M. Carleton as Museum Guard
- Wheaton Chambers as Bill, Museum Guard
- James Conaty as Party Guest
- John Crawford as Dandy at Party
- Vernon Downing as Leigh, Traitor
- Marjorie Eaton as Bessie, Danbury's Maid
- Myron Healey as Dandy at Party
- Boyd Irwin as Cranwell, Traitor
- Selmer Jackson as Mr. Dibbs, Museum Curator
- William H. O'Brien as Danbury Servant
- Scott Thomson as Dandy at Party
- Harry Woolman as Motorcycle Rider

== Production ==
The Time of Their Lives was filmed at Universal Studios from March 6 through May 15, 1946. The working title was The Ghost Steps Out. It was the first Abbott and Costello film to be directed by Charles Barton, who would go on to helm eight of their movies, including Abbott and Costello Meet Frankenstein (1948).

As in the duo's preceding film, Little Giant, Abbott and Costello do not play friends or partners, but are individual characters. Also as in the previous movie, Costello's character is largely the hero, while Abbott plays a somewhat unsympathetic dual role. The team's trademark burlesque routines are absent, and they speak directly to each other only in one scene at the beginning of the film. This change in the comics' onscreen formula was reportedly due to both disappointing box office receipts for their 1945 films The Naughty Nineties, Here Come the Co-Eds, and Abbott and Costello in Hollywood, and personal tensions that led to a brief break up that year.

Advertising materials for the film depicted both Abbott and Costello in modern clothes, and gave no indication that the film was part period piece or fantasy.

Bud Abbott, who had epilepsy and had not previously learned to drive, did so for one scene in this film. According to his son, Bud Abbott Jr., this was the only time in his life he ever drove an automobile.

A few weeks into filming, Costello wanted to switch roles with Abbott. He refused to report to work, but director Charles Barton waited him out. Costello eventually returned, said nothing more about it, and continued in the same role.

== Reception ==
Although the film was a departure from the usual Abbott and Costello formula, Variety magazine called it "a picnic for Abbott and Costello fans" that "won't shock the patrons with any unfamiliar novelties ... Direction is well-aimed at the belly-laugh level, and the trick photography is handled with flawless technique." Motion Picture Daily wrote, "Any resemblance between this and the last half dozen Abbott and Costello pictures is so slight and incidental as to be written off completely by the showmen whose customers used to raise the rafters with shouts and screams of laughter in the dawn of the A. and C. era. The audience present at the previewing of The Time of Their Lives at the Forum Theater in Los Angeles all but rolled in the aisles with merriment, exactly as in the good old days." The Hollywood Reporter wrote, "By long odds, it is the best A&C show to date."

Trade critic sentiment did not translate into box-office, however. Abbott and Costello slipped to 20th place overall (but 12th among independent theater owners) in the 1946 Motion Picture Herald poll of top money making stars after placing 11th overall (and 12th among independent theater owners) in 1945.

== Re-release ==
The film was re-released in 1951, along with Little Giant.

== Home media ==
The film has been released three times on VHS: 1989, 1991, and 2000. It has also been released twice on DVD: The Best of Abbott and Costello Volume Two on May 4, 2004; and on October 28, 2008, as part of Abbott and Costello: The Complete Universal Pictures Collection.

== See also ==
- List of ghost films
- List of films about the American Revolution
