= Norman Abbott =

American entertainer

- Born: July 11, 1922; New York City, New York, U.S.
- Died: July 9, 2016 (aged 93); Valencia, California, U.S.
- Occupation(s): Vaudevillian, Actor, Producer, Director
- Spouse: Dominique Abbott
- Children: 4 (inc. 3 stepsons)
- Relatives: Bud Abbott (uncle)

Norman Abbott (July 11, 1922 – July 9, 2016) was an American vaudevillian, actor, producer and television director.

== Life and career ==
Abbott was born in New York City, where his mother and his uncle, comedian Bud Abbott of Abbott and Costello, raised him. His early experience in entertainment was as a vaudeville performer, including summers working the 'borscht circuit" in resorts in the Catskill Mountains of New York.

While Abbott and Costello were filming Rio Rita in 1942, Bud Abbott arranged for his nephew to play an unbilled bit in the movie. This led to two more small roles in MGM "B" features. In the early 1940s, he and Pat Costello (brother of Lou Costello) worked as stand-ins for Abbott and Costello during the filming of Who Done It? (1942), and Norman played a bit as a pop-eyed radio organist. When actor Bernard Punsly left Universal's Little Tough Guys series to join the armed forces, Norman Abbott was recruited to replace Punsly in Abbott's only starring film, Keep 'Em Slugging (1943).

During World War II, Abbott served as a member of the original United States Navy SEALs team.

After the war, Abbott became a dialogue director on the Abbott and Costello films and was mentored by the team's director, Charles T. Barton. Abbott later directed episodes of The Jack Benny Program, Leave It to Beaver, Get Smart, The Munsters, Welcome Back, Kotter, Dennis the Menace, and Sanford and Son.

Abbott's obituary in The Hollywood Reporter described him as "the brainchild behind the Broadway sensation Sugar Babies, the comeback vehicle for Mickey Rooney in the late 1970s". He conceived the idea of a Broadway musical based on burlesque after inheriting his uncle's "treasure trove of burlesque material, including written gags, props, music and posters". Despite his having originated the concept, Abbott was fired as director of the show after two weeks of rehearsing.

Abbott died in Valencia, California, on July 9, 2016.

== Filmography ==
Year	Title	Role	Notes
1942	Rio Rita	Hotel Laundry Boy	Uncredited
1942	Grand Central Murder	Whistling Messenger	Uncredited
1942	The Affairs of Martha	Newsboy	Uncredited
1942	Who Done It?	Organist	Uncredited
1942	Whistling in Dixie	Attendant	Uncredited
1943	Keep 'Em Slugging	Ape	(leading role)
1950	Katie Did It	Chick	Uncredited
1953	Walking My Baby Back Home	Doc	
