= John Grant (screenwriter) =

American comedy writer (1891–1955)

- Born: 27 December 1891; Tarentum, Pennsylvania, United States
- Died: 19 November 1955 (aged 63); Palm Desert, California, United States
- Occupation: Screenwriter
- Spouse: Dorothy Maye Grant

John Grant (December 27, 1891 – November 19, 1955) was a comedy writer best known for his association with Bud Abbott and Lou Costello. Costello called him their "chief idea man". Grant contributed to Abbott and Costello's radio, film and live television scripts, as well as the films of Dean Martin and Jerry Lewis and Ma and Pa Kettle.

== Career ==
=== Early career ===
Although he appeared in a few legitimate musical comedies, Grant was primarily a burlesque comedian, straight man and producer. He performed in shows on the Columbia and Mutual Burlesque wheels in the 1920s, and at Minsky's in the early 1930s. His second wife, Dorothy Maye, was a strip tease artist.

=== Abbott and Costello ===
Grant met Bud Abbott in burlesque in the early 1920s when Abbott was still working in theater box offices. While working for Mutual as a general manager and trouble shooter, Grant cut Lou Costello's salary during the Great Depression. Two years later, according to Hedda Hopper, he and Costello met again when the latter was appearing on a bill at a Brooklyn theatre; Abbott was also appearing there and Grant suggested that they team up. They did and were an immediate success. (This story is inconsistent with the most credible and documented version of events, where the team first performed together at the Eltinge Theater in 1935 and teamed nearly a year later.)

Abbott and Costello spent the next two years playing burlesque, vaudeville, and the Steel Pier in Atlantic City. In February 1938 they were booked on the Kate Smith radio program. After several appearances they hired Grant, who was working in Toronto, to be their head writer. Grant contributed material for Abbott and Costello on radio, in films, and on the Colgate Comedy Hour.

Grant contributed to nearly every Abbott and Costello film by injecting comedy routines into stories written by other screenwriters. Most of his material would be included in the final film because he was the only writer Abbott and Costello trusted. He was also on the set during filming and helped with ad-libbed material. In 1941 Hedda Hopper described Grant as "much more than the writer of those laugh jerkers that have zoomed the pair into box office tops; he's their friend, confidant and godfather, and the three of them are more like brothers than business associates."

Grant frequently modified established burlesque material and other comedians sometimes claimed ownership. In October 1941 a former burlesque colleague of Grant's, Barney Gerard, claimed Grant and Abbott and Costello had plagiarized or paraphrased two routines when the team were regulars on The Chase and Sanborn Hour radio show.

=== Producer ===
In May 1943, with Abbott and Costello temporarily sidelined by Costello's illness, Grant was promoted to producer at the team's home studio, Universal. The studio announced that he would produce a musical in color, Hip Hip Hooray. This became Bowery to Broadway (1944). Grant also received a producer credit on the Abbott and Costello films Here Come The Co-Eds and The Naughty Nineties (both 1945).

=== Firing and Re-hiring ===
During the second Red Scare, Costello became convinced that there was a communist conspiracy to infiltrate the film industry. He demanded that his employees sign a loyalty oath swearing that they had no Communist ties. Grant refused to sign and Costello fired him in 1951. Grant, who was never blacklisted, did not work on their film Lost in Alaska (1952), but did work on the films Double Crossbones (1951) with Donald O'Connor, Ma and Pa Kettle at the Fair (1951), and Sailor Beware with Martin and Lewis. Costello felt that the script for Lost in Alaska suffered because of Grant's absence and rehired him for Abbott and Costello Meet Captain Kidd (1952) and subsequent films.

Grant's later screenplay credits include Abbott and Costello Go to Mars (1953); Abbott and Costello Meet Dr. Jekyll and Mr. Hyde (1953); Abbott and Costello Meet the Keystone Kops (1955); and Abbott and Costello Meet the Mummy (1955). Grant was credited on a film originally written for Abbott and Costello, Fireman Save My Child (1954), which was made with Hugh O'Brian and Buddy Hackett when Costello became ill.

=== Final Years ===
Grant died of a heart attack on 19 November 1955 in Palm Desert, California. He was survived by his wife, Dorothy; his brother and three sisters; and two daughters from his first marriage.

== Family ==
Grant's love of burlesque and vaudeville was passed down to his two daughters from his first marriage. He also inspired his great-grandson, Ken Drab, who in 2008 became a webcomic artist and has authored and illustrated several children's books.

== Select Credits ==
- One Night in the Tropics (1941) - uncredited
- Buck Privates (1941)
- In the Navy (1941)
- Hold That Ghost (1941)
- Keep 'Em Flying (1941)
- Ride 'Em Cowboy (1942)
- Rio Rita (1942) - "special material"
- Pardon My Sarong (1942)
- Who Done It? (1942)
- It Ain't Hay (1943)
- Hit the Ice (1943)
- In Society (1944)
- Lost in a Harem (1944)
- Bowery to Broadway (1944) - producer only
- Here Come the Co-eds (1945) - also producer
- The Naughty Nineties (1945) - also producer
- The Time of Their Lives (1946)
- Buck Privates Come Home (1947)
- The Wistful Widow of Wagon Gap (1947)
- The Noose Hangs High (1948)
- Abbott and Costello Meet Frankenstein (1948)
- Mexican Hayride (1948)
- Abbott and Costello Meet the Killer, Boris Karloff (1949)
- Abbott and Costello in the Foreign Legion (1950)
- Abbott and Costello Meet the Invisible Man (1951)
- Double Crossbones (1951)
- Comin' Round the Mountain (1951)
- Sailor Beware (1952) - additional dialogue
- The Colgate Comedy Hour (1952–55)(TV Series)
- Ma and Pa Kettle at the Fair (1952)
- Abbott and Costello Meet Captain Kidd (1952)
- Abbott and Costello Go to Mars (1953)
- Abbott and Costello Meet Dr. Jekyll and Mr. Hyde (1953)
- Fireman Save My Child (1954)
- Abbott and Costello Meet the Keystone Kops (1955)
- Abbott and Costello Meet the Mummy (1955)

== Notes ==
- Furmanek, Bob and Ron Palumbo (1991). Abbott and Costello in Hollywood. New York: Perigee Books. ISBN 0-399-51605-0
