= Gene de Paul =

American musician (1919–1988)

Background information
- Born: Gene Vincent de Paul; June 17, 1919; New York City, New York, U.S.
- Died: February 27, 1988 (aged 68) Northridge, California, U.S.
- Occupation(s): Pianist, composer, songwriter
- Instrument: Piano

Gene Vincent de Paul (June 17, 1919 – February 27, 1988) was an American pianist, composer and songwriter.

== Biography ==
Born in New York City, he served in the United States Army during World War II. He was married to Billye Louise Files (November 23, 1924 – January 30, 1977) of Jack County, Texas.

He joined the American Society of Composers, Authors and Publishers (ASCAP) in 1941, and went on to compose the music for many motion pictures. He was nominated (with Don Raye) for an Academy Award for Best Music, Original Song in 1942 for the song "Pig Foot Pete" from the movie Hellzapoppin. The song actually was not included in that movie, but in the 1941 feature, Keep 'Em Flying, and was thus ineligible for the nomination and award. The award was given to "White Christmas".

De Paul collaborated with Johnny Mercer, Don Raye, Carolyn Leigh, Charles Rinker and others at Universal Studios, Walt Disney Studios and other Hollywood companies. His collaboration with Walt Disney Studios involved the creation of the music for "Alice in Wonderland," "The Legend of Sleepy Hollow," and "The Headless Horseman."

De Paul composed the 1953 hit song "Teach Me Tonight".

De Paul was one of the composers of the songs and dances, along with lyricist Johnny Mercer, for the 1954 musical film Seven Brides for Seven Brothers.

He was inducted into the Songwriters Hall of Fame in 1985.

Gene de Paul died in February 1988, at the age of 68, and was interred in the Forest Lawn Memorial Park Cemetery in Hollywood Hills.

== Musical film credits ==
- Seven Brides for Seven Brothers 1954 with lyrics by Johnny Mercer
- Lil Abner partnered with Johnny Mercer

== Broadway credits ==
- Li'l Abner 1956 with lyrics by Johnny Mercer

== Notable songs ==
- 1941 "I'll Remember April", w & m Don Raye, Patricia Johnston & Gene de Paul
- 1941 "You Don't Know What Love Is", w & m Don Raye & Gene de Paul
- 1941 "Gimme Some Skin, My Friend", (performed by The Andrews Sisters in the Abbott and Costello film In the Navy) w & m Don Raye & Gene de Paul
- 1942 "Cow Cow Boogie (Cuma-Ti-Yi-Yi-Ay)", music by Don Raye, lyrics by Benny Carter & Gene de Paul, featured in Ride 'Em Cowboy that year, and many films since, including The Aviator, Raging Bull, and The Joker Is Wild.
- 1943 "Star Eyes", w & m Don Raye & Gene de Paul from the film I Dood It
- 1944 "Mr. Five by Five", w & m Don Raye & Gene de Paul
- "He's My Guy" w & m Raye & de Paul, introduced in the 1943 film of the same name, and recorded by Ella Fitzgerald, Peggy Lee and also Dinah Shore (included on the CD The War Years: Songs That Won The War, released 2001).
- 1953 "Teach Me Tonight" with lyrics by Sammy Cahn
