= Naughty Nineties =

Naughty Nineties may refer to:

- The Gay Nineties (1890s), a cultural period of liberalisation from the stern morality
- The Naughty Nineties a 1945 film set in the period starring Bud Abbott and Lou Costello
