= Hold That Ghost =

1941 film by Arthur Lubin

- Theatrical release poster
- Directed by: Arthur Lubin
- Written by: Robert Lees; Fred Rinaldo; John Grant
- Produced by: Burt Kelly; Glenn Tryon
- Starring: Bud Abbott; Lou Costello; Richard Carlson; Joan Davis; Evelyn Ankers; Shemp Howard; The Andrews Sisters
- Cinematography: Elwood Bredell
- Edited by: Philip Cahn
- Music by: Score: Hans J. Salter; Songs: Mário Lago (music); Roberto Roberti (music); Harold Adamson (lyrics) (all uncredited)
- Production company: Universal Pictures
- Distributed by: Universal Pictures
- Release date: August 6, 1941
- Running time: 85 minutes
- Country: United States
- Language: English
- Budget: initially $190,000; eventually over $300,000

Hold That Ghost is a 1941 American horror comedy film directed by Arthur Lubin and starring the comedy team of Abbott and Costello and featuring Joan Davis, Evelyn Ankers and Richard Carlson. It was produced and distributed by Universal Pictures. Abbott and Costello performed a half-hour live version of the film for radio audiences on Louella Parsons' Hollywood Premiere on August 1, 1941.

== Plot ==
Gas station attendants Chuck Murray and Ferdie Jones aspire to better jobs. They temporarily work as waiters at Chez Glamour, a high-class nightclub where Ted Lewis and The Andrews Sisters perform, but are fired for causing a scene. Ferdie dreams of having his own nightclub one day.

Back at the service station, gangster "Moose" Mattson, brings his car in for gas and cleaning. When he is spotted by the police, he speeds off with Chuck and Ferdie trapped inside the vehicle. During the chase, Matson trades shots with the police and is killed. According to the gangster's unconventional will, whoever was with Matson when he died will inherit his estate. The boys are bequeathed Mattson's rundown tavern, the Forrester's Club. Mattson had also given a cryptic clue about a hidden stash of money, stating that he "kept his money in his head," but its existence remains questionable.

Mattson's attorney introduces the boys to an associate, Charlie Smith. Chuck and Ferdie are unaware that Smith is a member of Moose's gang and seeks the money. Smith has arranged for a wildcat bus to drop them off at the Forrester's Club, but the unscrupulous bus driver abandons them and three unrelated passengers—a doctor, a radio actress, and a waitress—at the tavern during a heavy rainstorm.

As the night progresses, strange things happen. Smith disappears while searching the basement, and his corpse turns up unexpectedly several times. The water in the tavern tastes foul. Ferdie discovers his bedroom is rigged to transform into a casino with hidden gambling equipment. The girls are scared by what appears to be a ghost. Two detectives show up, but vanish soon after starting their investigation. While Ferdie examines a map to find the quickest route back to town, candles on the table move mysteriously and scare him.

Ferdie inadvertently discovers Moose's treasure hidden inside the stuffed moose head above the fireplace. A disgruntled member of Moose's gang appears and demands the money at gunpoint. The boys manage to knock him out, but other gang members appear. Chuck and the doctor fight off two of them, while others chase Ferdie, who has the loot, through the tavern. Ferdie scares off all the gangsters by imitating the sound of a police siren. The doctor announces that the tavern's unsavory water has valuable therapeutic properties, and Ferdie and Chuck transform the place into a posh health resort. The boys hire Ted Lewis and The Andrews Sisters to headline, and the maitre d' who fired them from Chez Glamour turns up as a temp waiter.

== Cast ==
Actor	Role
Bud Abbott	Chuck Murray
Lou Costello	Ferdinand Jones
Richard Carlson	Dr. Jackson
Joan Davis	Camille Brewster
Evelyn Ankers	Norma Lind
Marc Lawrence	Charlie Smith
Mischa Auer	Gregory
Shemp Howard	Soda Jerk
Russell Hicks	Bannister (Matson's attorney)
William B. Davidson	Moose Matson
Ted Lewis and his Orchestra	Themselves
The Andrews Sisters	Themselves
Milton Parsons	Bus Driver
Harry Hayden	Jenkins
Paul Fix	Lefty

== Production ==
Hold that Ghost (working title: Oh, Charlie) was made immediately after Buck Privates, from January 21 through February 24, 1941, on a budget of $190,000. The original opened with Chuck and Ferdie working at their gas station and featured many scenes of Mattson's gang planning or attempting to scare the boys out of the tavern. At the climax, another faction of Mattson's gang who had escaped from prison arrives and the rival groups fight over the loot, which turns out to be counterfeit. The state police, who had picked up the wildcat bus driver, arrive and arrest the gang members. Chuck and Ferdie are still able to open a resort based on the therapeutic properties of the well water.

Lubin said the film "had more of a plot" than Buck Privates. "It was more or less straight comedy."

As the film was nearing completion, Buck Privates became one of Universal's all-time biggest hits. Oh, Charlie's release was delayed so that the studio could hastily make and release a second Abbott and Costello service comedy, In the Navy. Universal then put Oh, Charlie back into production in mid-May to append the opening and closing of the film with musical numbers by the Andrews Sisters (who appeared in both service comedies) and bandleader Ted Lewis. New scenes were written and others were re-shot for continuity purposes. These revisions were scripted primarily by Edmund L. Hartmann without credit. Upgrading Oh, Charlie cost anywhere from $25,000 to $150,000, according to different studio sources. In June 1941, the picture was retitled Hold That Ghost.

A 30-minute radio adaptation was performed by Abbott and Costello on Louella Parsons' program, Hollywood Premiere, one week before the film was released.

== Reception ==
Upon the film's release it received almost unanimously positive reviews. The Motion Picture Herald reported, "Yes, Ladies and Gentlemen, they’ve done it again. In fact by count and with witnesses, the Messrs. Abbott and Costello got more, louder and longer laughs in Hold That Ghost at its Hollywood preview than they did in Buck Privates or In the Navy. Veritably, it is to be doubted if any two comedians ever got so many laughs in one picture any time, anywhere." The Hollywood Reporter added: "the laughs come so fast and furious that a great many lines are entirely drowned out. At one point, about half the audience was saying ‘Sh’ to the other half."

Motion Picture Daily called it "by far the corniest comedy the Abbott and Costello duo has committed, but don’t get me wrong—for 'corniest' is, in this case, a synonym for best." Variety called the picture "a slam-bang and knockabout comedy, silly and ridiculous, but a laugh-creator and audience-pleaser."

Critics did complain about the superfluous musical numbers. The Philadelphia Inquirer was typical: "Universal dusted off Ted Lewis and the Andrews Sisters, inserting them in nightclub sequences fore and aft to add a bit of ‘name’ value. For our money...they only pad out the picture." The New York Times considered the film "immensely funny" but also criticized its musical numbers and, as a result, its length.

Review aggregation website Rotten Tomatoes reports that 100% of critics gave the film positive write-ups based on six reviews, and 90% of 780 users liked it, with an average rating of 4.2/5, earning it a "Fresh" score. Film critic Leonard Maltin gave the film three out of four stars and noted it as "Prime A&C." Allmovie contributor Hal Erickson gave the film three out of a possible five stars and stated that the "moving candle" scene might be "Costello's funniest-ever screen scene." Abbott and Costello biographer Jim Mulholland has described it as the "team's best film next to Buck Privates."

== Rerelease ==
Hold that Ghost was re-released twice by Realart Pictures in 1948 and 1949, along with Hit the Ice.

== Home media ==
This film has been released on VHS three times: 1982, 1988 and 1991. It was released twice on DVD. The first time, on The Best of Abbott and Costello Volume One, on February 10, 2004, and again on October 28, 2008, as part of Abbott and Costello: The Complete Universal Pictures Collection.
