= The Big Chase =

- Theatrical release poster
- Directed by: Arthur Hilton
- Written by: Fred Freiberger; Orville H. Hampton
- Produced by: Robert L. Lippert Jr.
- Starring: Glenn Langan; Adele Jergens; Lon Chaney Jr.
- Cinematography: John J. Martin
- Edited by: Carl Pierson
- Music by: Bert Shefter
- Production company: Lippert Productions
- Distributed by: Lippert Pictures; Exclusive Films (UK)
- Release date: June 18, 1954
- Running time: 60 minutes
- Country: United States
- Language: English

The Big Chase is a 1954 American crime drama film directed by Arthur Hilton and starring Glenn Langan, Adele Jergens, Lon Chaney Jr., Jim Davis and Douglas Kennedy. One of the film's scenes was directed by producer Robert L. Lippert Jr. This is the second film in which Langan appeared with Jergens, his real-life wife.

== Plot ==
A policeman with a pregnant wife on his side uses a helicopter to chase a payroll thief trying to escape to Mexico.

== Cast ==
- Glenn Langan as Officer Pete Grayson
- Adele Jergens as Doris Grayson
- Lon Chaney Jr. as Kip
- Jim Davis as Brad Bellows
- Douglas Kennedy as Police Lt. Ned Daggert
- Jay Lawrence as Jim Miggs
- Joe Flynn as Milton Graves
- Phil Arnold as Bunkie
- Gil Perkins as payroll guard
- Wheaton Chambers as Doctor Janssen
- Lita Milan as nurse

== Reception ==
The Monthly Film Bulletin wrote: "A harsh, lucid and semi-documentary method, combined with rapidly paced cutting, give this thriller more than usual tension. No gloss is cast over the absence of moral sense in the criminals, and their pursuers are shown in a scarcely more favourable light; the story has a tang of vicious reality and certainly succeeds in inducing nervous pressure. A "B" picture with a distinct flavour."
