= Abbott and Costello Go to Mars =

1953 film by Charles Lamont

- Theatrical release poster
- Directed by: Charles Lamont
- Screenplay by: D. D. Beauchamp; John Grant
- Story by: Howard Christie; D. D. Beauchamp
- Produced by: Howard Christie
- Starring: Bud Abbott; Lou Costello; Mari Blanchard; Robert Paige; Horace McMahon
- Cinematography: Clifford Stine
- Edited by: Russell Schoengarth
- Music by: Henry Mancini; Milton Rosen; Herman Stein
- Production company: Universal-International
- Distributed by: Universal Pictures
- Release date: April 6, 1953
- Running time: 77 minutes
- Country: United States
- Language: English
- Budget: $762,446
- Box office: $1.25 million (US and Canada rentals)

Abbott and Costello Go to Mars is a 1953 American science fiction comedy film starring the comedy team of Bud Abbott and Lou Costello and directed by Charles Lamont. It was produced by Howard Christie and made by Universal-International. Despite the film's title, no character in the film actually travels to the planet Mars (although Abbott and Costello's characters believe they are on Mars at one point.) The film marks the debut of Harry Shearer.

== Plot ==
Original trailer

Orville, the oldest orphan at the Hideaway Orphans Home, accidentally hides inside a truck headed to a top-secret laboratory. There he is placed under the supervision of lab worker Lester to help load supplies onto an experimental rocket ship. While on board with Lester, Orville flips the ignition switch and the rocket ship blasts off, flying across the country and eventually landing outside of New Orleans, where Mardi Gras is in progress. Lester and Orville, believing that they have successfully landed on Mars, don spacesuits and go into the city, where they assume the grotesquely costumed celebrants are Martians, while the others assume they are fellow costumed celebrants.

Meanwhile, two escaped convicts, Harry the Horse and Mugsy, stumble upon the rocket ship, put on spacesuits and head to New Orleans to rob a bank and steal clothes. Lester and Orville are wrongly accused of the crimes and flee back to the rocket ship, where Mugsy and Harry force them to launch and demand to actually go to Mars. However, once in outer space, Lester and Orville get control of the crooks' gun and attempt to land back on Earth.

The ship instead lands on Venus, where the four men are quickly captured by female guards and brought to the ruler of the planet, Queen Allura. She informs them that Venus is inhabited only by women because men were banished long ago. She takes more than a liking to Orville and makes him her king consort on the condition that he remains true to her. Orville agrees, and has Harry and Mugsy imprisoned. However, Mugsy convinces one of the female guards to flirt with Orville to prove to Queen Allura that he cannot be trusted. Disillusioned with Orville, the Queen orders all the men to leave Venus.

Upon returning to the Earth, the men are lauded as heroes in a parade, but Allura, who is watching the celebration from Venus, sends a spaceship to Earth to drop a cake on Orville's head.

== Cast ==
- Bud Abbott as Lester
- Lou Costello as Orville
- Mari Blanchard as Allura
- Robert Paige as Dr Wilson
- Horace McMahon as Mugsy
- Martha Hyer as Janie
- Jack Kruschen as Harry
- Joe Kirk as Dr. Orvilla
- Jean Willes as Capt. Olivia
- Anita Ekberg as Venusian Guard
- Jackie Loughery as Guard
- Renate Hoy (Miss Germany) as Handmaiden
- Harry Shearer as Boy
- Dudley Dickerson as Porter

== Production ==
Science fiction author Robert A. Heinlein wrote a film treatment in 1950 titled Abbott and Costello Move to the Moon that may have inspired the film's screenplay.

Principal photography took place from August 1 to 28, 1952.

The Venusian women were played by 1952 Miss Universe contestants, including Anita Ekberg, the winner of the Miss Sweden competition a year earlier. The Venusian cars featured in Abbott and Costello Go to Mars were later used in the science fiction film This Island Earth (1955).

Harry Shearer made his debut as a child at the orphanage.

Shortly after the film's release, Abbott and Costello appeared on The Colgate Comedy Hour and did a comedy sketch in which they attended the film's premiere.

== Home media ==
The film has had two DVD releases, the first as part of The Best of Abbott and Costello Volume Three, released on August 3, 2004, and the second as part of Abbott and Costello: The Complete Universal Pictures Collection, released on October 28, 2008.

== In popular culture ==
In the 2018 film Stan & Ollie, Stan Laurel, played by Steve Coogan, looks ruefully at a film poster for Abbott and Costello Go to Mars just after learning that his last chance to make a new film with Oliver Hardy has fallen through.
