= Edmund Hartmann =

American screenwriter (1911–2003)

Edmund L. Hartmann (September 24, 1911 – November 28, 2003) was an American film and television writer and producer from the 1930s to the 1970s. Hartmann worked with numerous actors, including Bob Hope. He produced the television classic My Three Sons for ten seasons from 1962 and also produced Family Affair. Both shows were filmed by Don Fedderson Productions.

== Early years ==
Hartmann was born in St. Louis, Missouri, in 1911; his father was Moses Hartmann, a judge in St. Louis. Hartmann graduated from Soldan High School when he was 15 years old and from Washington University in St. Louis in 1931. During his time studying law at the university he wrote songs for musicals that were performed on campus and acted in some productions. He was a member of Delta Theta Phi legal fraternity and Pi Tau Pi schoastic organization.

== Career ==
After graduating Hartmann moved to New York, where he was one of the writers for comedies that included Strike Me Pink and Scandals. He moved to Hollywood by 1934. Film studios for which he wrote included Paramount, Fox, RKO, Universal, and Warner Bros.

In 1959, Hartmann was chairman of the Writers Guild of America.

== Personal life and death ==
Hartmann was married to Julie Riley and Virginia Smith. He had one child (Susan Hartmann). He was a grandfather to four. He died in his long-time home in Santa Fe, New Mexico, on November 28, 2003, aged 92.

== Works ==
=== Writer ===
- After the Honeymoon (1971)
- The Shakiest Gun in the West (1968)
- The Sword of Ali Baba (1965)
- Casanova's Big Night (1954)
- Here Come the Girls (1953)
- The Caddy (1953)
- My Favorite Spy (1951)
- The Lemon Drop Kid (1951)
- Fancy Pants (1950)
- Sorrowful Jones (1949)
- The Paleface (1948)
- Let's Live a Little (1948)
- Variety Girl (1947)
- The Face of Marble (1946)
- The Naughty Nineties (1945)
- Sudan (1945)
- See My Lawyer (1945)
- Here Come the Co-Eds (1945)
- The Scarlet Claw (1944)
- Ali Baba and the Forty Thieves (1944)
- Sherlock Holmes and the Secret Weapon (1943)
- Hi Diddle Diddle (1943)
- Hi'ya, Chum (1943)
- Lady Bodyguard (1943)
- Sherlock Holmes and the Secret Weapon (1942)
- Ride 'Em Cowboy (1942)
- The Feminine Touch (1941)
- Sweetheart of the Campus (1941)
- Time Out for Rhythm (1941)
- San Francisco Docks (1940)
- Diamond Frontier (1940)
- South to Karanga (1940)
- Enemy Agent (1940)
- Ma! He's Making Eyes at Me (1940)
- Black Friday (1940)
- Two Bright Boys (1939)
- Ex-Champ (1939)
- Big Town Czar (1939)
- The Last Warning (1938)
- The Last Express (1938)
- Law of the Underworld (1938)
- Hideaway (1937)
- Behind the Headlines (1937)
- The Man Who Found Himself (1937)
- China Passage (1937)
- Wanted! Jane Turner (1936)
- Without Orders (1936)
- The Big Noise

=== Producer ===
- To Rome With Love (1969)
- Family Affair (1966)
- My Three Sons (1960)
