= Arthur Hilton =

British-born film editor and director (1897–1979)

- Born: April 5, 1897; London, England
- Died: October 15, 1979 (aged 82); Sherman Oaks, California, U.S.
- Occupation: Film Editor
- Years active: 1928–1979

Arthur Hilton (April 5, 1897 – October 15, 1979) was a British-born film editor and director.

== Biography ==
Hilton was born in London and edited his first film in 1928. Shortly after, he immigrated to the US, where he worked on such films as the W. C. Fields classic comedies The Bank Dick (1940) and Never Give a Sucker an Even Break (1941), and Julien Duvivier's portmanteau film Flesh and Fantasy (1943). Hilton was nominated for an Academy Award in 1946 for Best Film Editing for Robert Siodmak's film noir The Killers.

Hilton later established himself as a director, with his film director credits including The Return of Jesse James (1950), The Big Chase (1954), and Cat-Women of the Moon (1953), the latter considered by The Encyclopedia of Science Fiction as "absurd [but] one of the most influential science-fiction films ever made.". Hilton's television director credits include Lassie, New Comedy Showcase, Mission: Impossible, Wanted Dead or Alive, and Police Story. Hilton was recognized by American Cinema Editors for his editing work on the 1977 mini-series Washington: Behind Closed Doors.

== Selected filmography ==
- 1930: Captain Thunder
- 1931: The Virtuous Husband
- 1933: What Price Innocence?
- 1934: That's Gratitude
- 1935: Swellhead
- 1935: Together We Live
- 1936: In Paris, A.W.O.L.
- 1938: Breaking the Ice
- 1940: The Bank Dick
- 1941: Keep 'Em Flying
- 1941: Man Made Monster
- 1942: Who Done It?
- 1942: Pardon My Sarong
- 1943: Flesh and Fantasy
- 1943: Crazy House
- 1944: Phantom Lady
- 1944: The Suspect
- 1944: Bowery to Broadway
- 1944: Ghost Catchers
- 1945: Scarlet Street
- 1945: Here Come the Co-Eds
- 1945: The Strange Affair of Uncle Harry
- 1945: The Naughty Nineties
- 1946: The Killers
- 1948: Let's Live a Little
- 1948: Secret Beyond the Door
- 1950: The Baron of Arizona
- 1950: The Return of Jesse James
- 1950: House by the River
- 1953: Cat-Women of the Moon
- 1954: The Big Chase
- 1973: Harry in Your Pocket
