= 10,000 Kids and a Cop =

- Directed by: Charles Barton
- Starring: Bud Abbott; Lou Costello
- Narrated by: James Stewart; Brenda Joyce
- Distributed by: Universal Pictures
- Release date: October 1948
- Country: United States
- Language: English

10,000 Kids and a Cop is a 1948 documentary short directed by Charles Barton about the philanthropic work of the Lou Costello Jr. Youth Foundation in Los Angeles, California, named after the comedian's son who had died in 1943 aged 1, and it was originally distributed for free to U.S. film exhibitors.

== Cast ==
- Abbott and Costello
- James Stewart
- William Bendix
- Brenda Joyce

== Home media ==
A restored version of the film was included as a special feature in the 2006 DVD release of The Abbott and Costello Show.
