= Fireman Save My Child (1954 film) =

1954 film by Leslie Goodwins

- Theatrical poster.
- Directed by: Leslie Goodwins
- Written by: Lee Loeb; John Grant
- Produced by: Howard Christie
- Starring: Spike Jones; Hugh O'Brian; Buddy Hackett
- Cinematography: Clifford Stine
- Edited by: Russell Schoengarth
- Distributed by: Universal Pictures
- Release date: May 2, 1954
- Running time: 79-80 mins
- Country: United States
- Language: English

Fireman Save My Child is a 1954 American comedy film starring Hugh O'Brian and Buddy Hackett. The movie was originally intended for Bud Abbott and Lou Costello. It was directed by Leslie Goodwins.

== Plot ==
In San Francisco in the 1910s, the clownish musical band that runs Firehouse 12 often drowns out alarms with their loud music. Smokey Hinkle (Buddy Hackett), a bumbling inventor and scion of a renowned firefighting family, buys retired firehouse horse Emma to pull his buggy, but when Emma hears an alarm, she follows the fire trucks at top speed. Smokey arrives at the fire at the same time as his pal, fireman Smitty (Hugh O'Brian), who points out that the blaze is in Smokey's own house. Smokey uses his new invention, an ingenious fire extinguisher, to put out the flames, prompting Smitty to hire Smokey as a fireman in exchange for half of the profits from the sale of the extinguisher.

Back at the firehouse, Smokey immediately starts a fire and struggles to convince Lt. McGinty (Spike Jones), who is busy leading band rehearsal that they must stop playing and put out the flames. Soon after, Capt. Bill Peters (Tom Brown) demonstrates his new mechanized fire-engine, and although it continually breaks down, he insists to Chief Rorty (George Cleveland) that his truck is the way of the future. Rorty agrees to let him motorize one firehouse, but frustrates Bill by assigning him to Firehouse 12. The squad immediately set to work on the new equipment, and although Smokey proves to be an inept fireman, he excels at Bill's tests because of his dedication to memorizing the manual. To slow Smokey's progress, the other firemen steal his pants, forcing him to repeatedly attend drills in his underwear.

Meanwhile, Smokey sells Emma, and her new owner (Ned Davenport) grows frustrated as she continues to chase fire trucks, and sells her for pennies. During the next weeks, everyone in the firehouse except for Smokey gains skills with the mechanized hoses and ladders. During one drill Smokey falls from the speeding truck into the apartment of Harry (Henry Kulky), a large and jealous husband who assumes Smokey is having an affair with his wife (Adele Jergens). When Smitty gets thrown from the truck into the same apartment days later, Harry promptly decides to move to New York. Commissioner Spencer (Harry Cheshire) then plans a party, for which McGinty's band practices night and day. When Harry later becomes trapped in his Murphy bed and his wife sounds an alarm, Firehouse 12 shows up wearing their silly band outfits, causing Spencer to suspend them all. Bill resigns in defeat, after which Smokey barges into Spencer's office to defend the men.

Realizing Smokey is related to renowned firefighters Hose, Hook and Ladder Hinkle, Spencer reinstates the firehouse, and then urges Smokey to demonstrate his fire extinguisher. The invention is a hit, but Smokey infuriates Smitty by donating it to the city for free. At Spencer's party, McGinty's band plays a number that includes a little person climbing out of the tuba and a grenade explosion. Just before Smokey displays his extinguisher to the crowd, jealous rivals replace the fluid with gasoline, which triggers a bonfire. Deducing the ruse, Smokey, Smitty and McGinty jump in the fire-engine and chase the hoodlums' car, followed closely by Emma and her bewildered new owner. When the hoodlums pull into a garage, Smokey flies off the fire hose and through the garage window, and subdues the men by spraying them with his extinguisher.

By the time Spencer arrives, the fire truck has combusted, but Smokey extinguishes it with ease, impressing the crowd. Smitty is thrilled until Smokey admits that he has forgotten the formula for the extinguisher. Soon after, Smokey, Smitty and McGinty are called to rescue Harry's wife, who thanks them all with kisses, causing Harry to knock out all three. He tosses their unconscious bodies onto Emma, whose owner watches gratefully as she walks away.

== Cast ==
- Spike Jones as Lt. McGinty
- Buddy Hackett as Smokey Hinkle
- Hugh O'Brian as Smitty
- Tom Brown as Capt. Bill Peters
- George Cleveland as Chief Rorty
- Henry Kulky as Harry
- Adele Jergens as Harry's wife
- Harry Cheshire as Commissioner Spencer
- Tristram Coffin as Tucker
- John Cliff as Crane
- Ned Davenport as Emma's first owner
- Tim Graham as Emma's second owner
- Stafford Repp as Emma's third owner
- Robert Wehling as Emma's fourth owner
- Willis Bouchey as the Mayor
- Madge Blake as the Mayor's wife
- Billy Barty as the little person
- Lee Erickson as the boy
- William M. Griffith as the male secretary
- Henry Rowland as the fireman
- Charles Maxwell as the driver
- Spike Jones' City Slickers as the firemen

== Production ==
=== Casting ===
The Hugh O'Brian and Buddy Hackett roles were originally meant for Bud Abbott and Lou Costello, but last-minute substitutions were required when Costello fell ill. Comical musical band "Spike Jones and His City Slickers" also appear at great length, with Jones garnering top billing. The movie was directed by Leslie Goodwins.
