= Here Come the Co-Eds =

1945 film by Jean Yarbrough

- Theatrical release poster
- Directed by: Jean Yarbrough
- Screenplay by: Arthur T. Horman; John Grant
- Story by: Edmund Hartmann
- Produced by: John Grant
- Starring: Bud Abbott; Lou Costello; Peggy Ryan; Martha O'Driscoll; Lon Chaney Jr.
- Cinematography: George Robinson
- Edited by: Arthur Hilton
- Music by: Edgar Fairchild
- Distributed by: Universal Pictures
- Release date: February 2, 1945
- Running time: 88 minutes
- Country: United States
- Language: English
- Budget: $717,621.39

Here Come The Co-Eds is a 1945 American comedy film starring the comedy team Abbott and Costello.

== Plot ==
Oliver Quackenbush, Molly McCarthy and her brother Slats who acts as her publicity agent work for the Miramar Ballroom as taxi dancers. Slats plants a phony article in the local newspaper that declares Molly's ambition is to attend Bixby College. The dean of Bixby reads the article and offers her a scholarship. She agrees, but only if Oliver and Slats can accompany her. They are hired as caretakers.

Meanwhile, Chairman Kirkland, whose daughter Diane also attends Bixby, holds the mortgage on the college and threatens to foreclose if the dean continues to ignore tradition and does not expel Molly. Slats and Oliver run into some problems of their own as they fail at every task assigned to them by their supervisor, Mr. Johnson.

Slats devises a plan to raise $20,000 to save the school: Oliver will wrestle the Masked Marvel. However, just before the match the Masked Marvel becomes ill and is replaced by Mr. Johnson. Oliver still manages to win the match, and Slats takes the $1,000 winnings and bets it on Bixby in a basketball game at 20-to-1 odds. Unfortunately the bookie attempts to ensure the outcome by hiring a professional team to play in place of Bixby's opponent, Carleton. Oliver dresses in drag and joins the Bixby team. Halfway through the game he receives a bump on the head and is convinced he is Daisy Dimple, "the world's greatest woman basketball player." Bixby pulls into the lead, but Oliver suffers another bump on the head and returns to his usual persona, and ends up losing the game for Bixby. To make up for it, he steals the bookie's money and after a crosstown chase (in a sailboat on a trailer), the boys arrive in time to pay the mortgage and save the school.

== Cast ==
- Bud Abbott as Slats McCarthy
- Lou Costello as Oliver Quackenbush
- Peggy Ryan as Patty Gayle
- Martha O'Driscoll as Molly McCarthy
- June Vincent as Diane Kirkland
- Lon Chaney Jr. as Johnson (credited as Lon Chaney)
- Donald Cook as Dean Larry Benson
- Charles Dingle as Jonathan Kirkland
- Phil Spitalny and his All-Girl Orchestra as themselves

== Production ==
- It was filmed from October 24 through December 6, 1944.
- North Hollywood Park was the filming location of Bixby college, while the school's main building was a Universal backlot "Shelby" home (Colonial Mansion 1927) that was also used in another Abbott and Costello film, The Time of Their Lives.
- Lou Costello was a real-life basketball star in high school, and performed many of the trick shots himself, without special effects.

== Rerelease ==
This film was re-released in 1950 by Realart Pictures.

Castle Films released three short films using scenes from the film Oysters and Muscles (1948), using the wrestling match, Fun on the Run (1949) using the basketball game and Kitchen Mechanics (1949) that used the cleaning of the caretaker's cottage.

== Routines ==
- This film includes the "Oyster Stew" routine, where Costello attempts to eat a bowl of soup containing an oyster that spits at him whenever he tries to take a sip. The routine was originated by Billy Bevan. A variation using a frog instead of an oyster appears in another Abbott and Costello film, The Wistful Widow of Wagon Gap. This gag also appears in The Three Stooges' short subjects, Dutiful But Dumb (1941), Shivering Sherlocks (1948) and Income Tax Sappy (1954).
- Another routine, previously used in One Night in the Tropics, is "Jonah and the Whale". In this routine, Costello attempts to tell a joke that he claims to have written himself, but Abbott says Costello surely can't be telling a particular joke, after which he goes on to spoil the punchline.

== Home media ==
This film has been released twice on DVD. The first time, on The Best of Abbott and Costello Volume Two, on May 4, 2004, and again on October 28, 2008, as part of Abbott and Costello: The Complete Universal Pictures Collection.
