= The 30 Foot Bride of Candy Rock =

1959 film

- Theatrical release poster
- Directed by: Sidney Miller
- Written by: Rowland Barber; Arthur Ross
- Produced by: Lewis J. Rachmil
- Starring: Lou Costello; Dorothy Provine; Gale Gordon
- Cinematography: Frank G. Carson
- Edited by: Al Clark
- Music by: Raoul Kraushaar; Rudy Schrager
- Distributed by: Columbia Pictures
- Release date: August 6, 1959
- Running time: 75 minutes
- Language: English
- Budget: $700,000

The 30 Foot Bride of Candy Rock is a 1959 American comedy science fiction film starring Lou Costello and Dorothy Provine and directed by Sidney Miller.

== Plot ==
Artie Pinsetter is a junk collector and amateur inventor who lives in the desert town of Candy Rock. Artie's fiancée, Emmy Lou Raven, is exposed to radiation in a cave and is thereby transformed into a thirty-foot giant. When Artie nervously explains to his betrothed's rich uncle that she has gotten "big", the uncle misunderstands "big" as "pregnant", and insists that Artie marry her immediately. After comic hilarity ensues, Artie is eventually able to restore her to normal size. But the final scene shows Pinsetter's dog has been enlarged to giant size, suggesting further problems.

== Cast ==
- Lou Costello as Artie Pinsetter
- Dorothy Provine as Emmy Lou Raven
- Gale Gordon as Rossiter
- Lenny Kent as The Sergeant
- Charles Lane as Standard Bates
- Jimmy Conlin as Magruder
- Will Wright as Pentagon General
- Peter Leeds as Bill Burton
- Veola Vonn as Jackie Delaney

== Production ==
The 30 Foot Bride of Candy Rock was filmed from December 3 through December 22, 1958, and is the only film that Lou Costello starred in without his longtime professional partner, Bud Abbott. It is based on an original screenplay titled The Secret Bride of Candy Rock Mountain.

The film was not released until August 1959, five months after Costello died of a heart attack.

Much of the outdoor footage was shot at the Iverson Movie Ranch in Chatsworth, California, including a number of scenes depicting the oversized blonde beauty at her new home—a barn. The barn was part of a ranch set on the Upper Iverson known as the Fury Set, which was originally built for the television show Fury.

== Critical reception ==
Writing in AllMovie, critic Hal Erickson described the film as "tr[ying] to be a satire of Attack of the Fifty Foot Woman, a slapstick comedy, a marital farce, and a sci-fi epic all in one, but it never really jells," further noting that "ill with rheumatic fever during shooting, Costello seems more solemn and reserved than usual." A review in TV Guide described the film as "basically a one-joke comedy" that "is fairly funny and, without the services of Abbott, less frantically paced than most Costello vehicles." Reviewer Rob Nixon wrote in Turner Classic Movies that the film "did exude a certain juvenile appeal," but also noted that Costello's widow "expressed her disappointment in the picture's quality with a line worthy of one of Abbott and Costello's routines: 'It would have killed him.'"

== In popular culture ==
Clips from the film were used for a parody in the music video "She Will Have Her Way" by Neil Finn.

== Home media ==
Sony Pictures Home Entertainment released the film as a made-to-order DVD on September 13, 2010. Mill Creek released the film on Blu-ray as part of a four film collection called "Sci-Fi from the Vault" on February 21, 2023.
