= Lou Costello =

American comedian and actor (1906–1959)

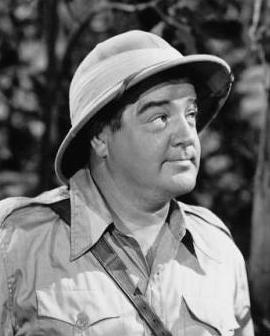
- Costello in Africa Screams (1949)
- Born: Louis Francis Cristillo; March 6, 1906; Paterson, New Jersey, U.S.
- Died: March 3, 1959 (aged 52); Beverly Hills, California, U.S.
- Resting place: Calvary Cemetery, Los Angeles
- Occupations: Comedian; actor; producer
- Years active: 1926–1959
- Spouse: Anne Battler (m. 1934)
- Children: 4
- Family: Pat Costello (brother); Joe Kirk (brother-in-law)

Signature
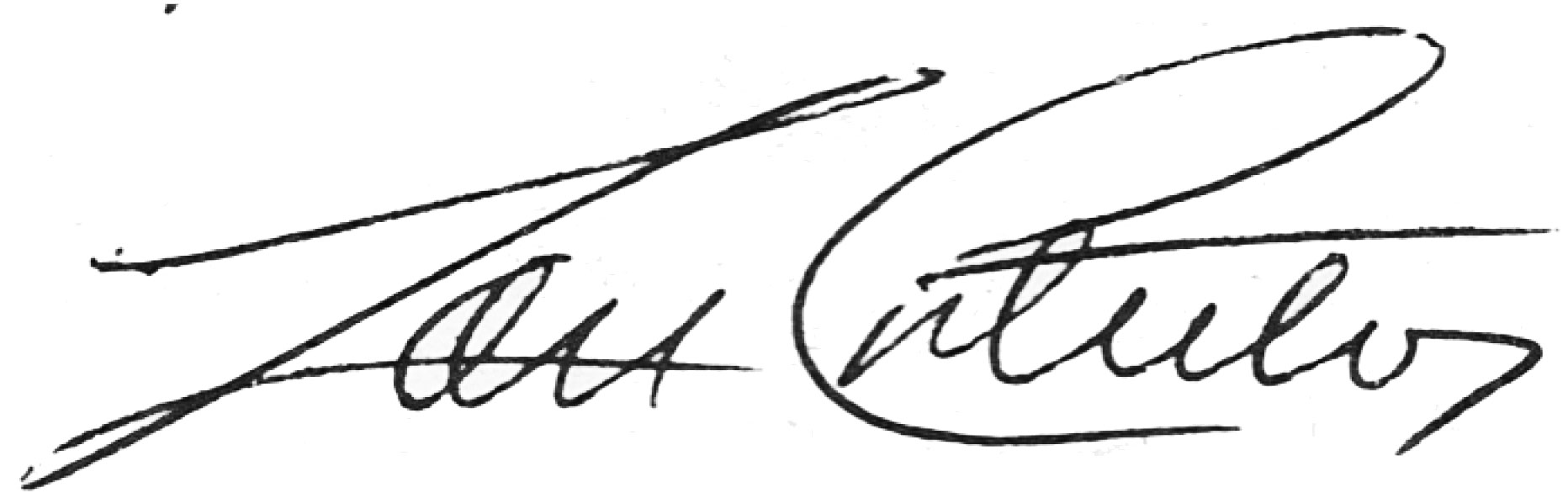

Louis Francis Cristillo (March 6, 1906 – March 3, 1959), better known as Lou Costello, was an American comedian, actor and producer. He was best known for his double act with Bud Abbott and their routine "Who's on First?".

Abbott and Costello, who teamed in burlesque in 1936, were among the most popular and highest-paid entertainers in the world during World War II. During a national tour in 1942, they sold $85 million in war bonds in 35 days. By 1955, their popularity waned from overexposure, and their film and television contracts lapsed. Their partnership ended in 1957, after which Costello made numerous solo appearances on TV and starred in one film.

== Early life ==
Louis Francis Cristillo was born on March 6, 1906, in Paterson, New Jersey, the son of Sebastiano Cristillo, an insurance sales agent, and Helen Rege, a silk weaver. His father was Italian, from Caserta, Campania, while his mother was an American of Italian, French and Irish ancestry, with her grandfather Francesco Rege being a native of Piedmont, Italy.

Costello attended Public School 15 in Paterson and was "an avid baseketball player." Here Come the Co-Eds director Jean Yarbrough said "that he (Costello) made all of the trick shots himself, never missing the basket." In his teens he fought as a boxer under the name of Lou King.

== Career ==
Costello was a great admirer of silent-film comedian Charlie Chaplin. In 1927, Costello hitchhiked to Hollywood to become an actor, but could only find work as a laborer or extra at Metro-Goldwyn-Mayer and Hal Roach Studios. His athletic skill brought him occasional work as a stunt man, notably in The Trail of '98 (1928). He can also be spotted sitting ringside in the Laurel and Hardy film The Battle of the Century (1927). He said that he took his professional name from actress Helene Costello, although by this time his brother Anthony (Pat) had used the name in his career as a professional musician.

=== Burlesque and Bud Abbott ===
In 1928, with the advent of talking pictures, Costello headed back east intending to acquire theatrical experience. Stranded in St. Joseph, Missouri, he persuaded a local burlesque producer to hire him as a "Dutch" comic, a corruption of Deutsch, meaning "German" in this context. (See also Joe Weber and Lew Fields.) By the end of 1928, Costello was back in New Jersey. He began working in burlesque on the Mutual Burlesque wheel in 1929.

After the Mutual Wheel collapsed during the Great Depression, Costello worked for several stock burlesque impresarios, including the Minskys, where he crossed paths with talented producer and straight man Bud Abbott. They did not work together until 1935 at the Eltinge Theatre on 42nd Street in New York City after Costello's straight man fell ill. They formally teamed in 1936.

=== Radio and Hollywood ===
Abbott and Costello were signed by the William Morris talent agency, which landed them featured roles and national exposure on The Kate Smith Hour, a popular radio variety show, in 1938. The team's signature routine, "Who's on First?", made its radio debut on Smith's show early that year. Many of the team's sketches were further polished by John Grant, an ex-burlesque producer and straight man who was hired soon after the team joined the program. Their success on the Smith show led to their appearance in a Broadway musical in 1939, The Streets of Paris.

Abbott and Costello were hosting a summer replacement series for The Fred Allen Show in 1940 when they were signed by Universal Pictures for supporting roles in One Night in the Tropics (1940). They stole the film with their classic routines, including a shortened version of "Who's On First?" (the complete version was performed in The Naughty Nineties, released in 1945). The team's breakthrough picture was Buck Privates, released early in 1941. Three more films followed in 1941, and they were voted the No. 3 box-office stars that year.

That year they became regulars on Edgar Bergen's The Chase and Sanborn Program, and in October 1942 launched their own series, The Abbott and Costello Show on NBC. The show ran on NBC through the spring of 1947, then ABC through the spring of 1949.

=== Fame and tragedy ===
As their careers grew more successful, serious cracks began to appear in Abbott and Costello's relationship. Reportedly their first disagreement occurred in 1936 over a booking in a minstrel show at the Steel Pier in Atlantic City, New Jersey. Costello wanted to accept the gig, which was outside their usual burlesque venues, but Abbott was hesitant. Costello offered Abbott a larger split of their salary, and Abbott agreed. At the end of 1941, Costello insisted that the team split their income 60/40 in Costello's favor, and Abbott agreed.

Abbott and Costello appeared in 36 films from 1940 to 1956 and were among the most popular and highest-paid entertainers in the world during World War II. Among their most popular films are Buck Privates, Hold That Ghost, Who Done It?, Pardon My Sarong, The Time of Their Lives, Buck Privates Come Home, Abbott and Costello Meet Frankenstein and Abbott and Costello Meet the Invisible Man.

In the summer of 1942, Abbott and Costello embarked on a 35-day cross-country tour to promote and sell war bonds. The Treasury Department credited them with the sale of $85 million in bonds.

In March 1943, after completing a winter tour of army bases, Costello suffered an attack of rheumatic fever and was unable to work for six months. On November 4 of that year, he returned to the team's popular radio show, but while rehearsing at their NBC studio, Costello received word that his infant son Lou Jr. had accidentally drowned in the family pool. Unnoticed by the nanny, the baby had worked loose the slats in his playpen and fallen into the pool.

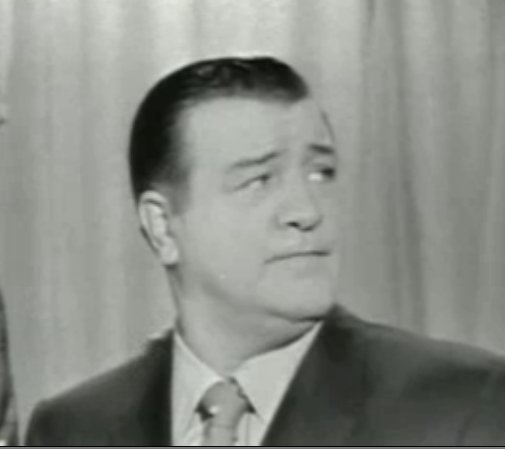
Costello being surprised on This Is Your Life in 1956

The baby was just two days short of his first birthday. Costello had asked his wife to keep Lou Jr. up to hear his father on the radio for the first time. Rather than cancel the broadcast, Costello said, "Wherever he is tonight, I want him to hear me," and proceeded with the show. No one in the audience knew of the death until after the show, when Bud Abbott explained the sad events of the day and how Costello epitomized the phrase "the show must go on" that night. Maxene Andrews of the Andrews Sisters said that Costello's demeanor changed after the loss of his son: "He didn't seem as fun-loving and as warm... He seemed to anger easily... there was a difference in his attitude."

In 1945, when Costello fired a maid and Abbott hired her, Costello announced that he would no longer work with Abbott. They remained under contract to Universal and were required to complete two films in 1946, which became Little Giant and The Time of Their Lives. The two men did not appear together much in either film and rarely spoke to one another off-camera. Abbott attempted to heal their relationship by suggesting that the foundation that they had founded for rheumatic fever sufferers be named the Lou Costello Jr. Youth Foundation, which touched Costello deeply. The youth foundation still exists in Los Angeles.

Their radio program moved to ABC, the former NBC Blue Network, from 1947 to 1949 and was prerecorded.

In 1951, the duo began to appear on live television, joining the rotating hosts of The Colgate Comedy Hour. Eddie Cantor, Martin and Lewis and Bob Hope were among the others. In 1952, their filmed situation comedy The Abbott and Costello Show began running in syndication nationwide. Costello owned the half-hour series, with Abbott working on salary. The show, which was loosely adapted from their radio program and films, ran for two seasons from 1952 to 1954 but found long life in syndicated reruns. Abbott and Costello were forced to withdraw from Fireman Save My Child in 1954 after Costello suffered a relapse of rheumatic fever. They were replaced by studio contract players Hugh O'Brian and Buddy Hackett.

Costello was surprised and honored by Ralph Edwards on NBC's This Is Your Life in 1956.

=== Abbott and Costello split ===
By the mid-1950s, Abbott and Costello no longer ranked among the top box-office stars. They were undermined by overexposure in concurrent film and television appearances, and were eclipsed by Dean Martin and Jerry Lewis, who were as popular in the 1950s as Abbott and Costello had been a decade earlier. In 1955 the team could not reach a contract agreement with Universal and left the studio after 15 years.

In the early 1950s, troubles with the Internal Revenue Service forced both men to sell their large homes and the rights to some of their films. Abbott and Costello's final film together, Dance with Me, Henry (1956), was a box-office disappointment and received mixed critical reviews.

Abbott and Costello dissolved their partnership amicably early in 1957. Costello worked with other comedians, including Sidney Fields in Las Vegas, and sought film and television projects. He appeared several times on Steve Allen's The Tonight Show, most often performing his old routines with Louis Nye or Tom Poston in the straight-man role. In 1958, he played a dramatic role in the episode "The Tobias Jones Story" of Wagon Train.

== Death ==
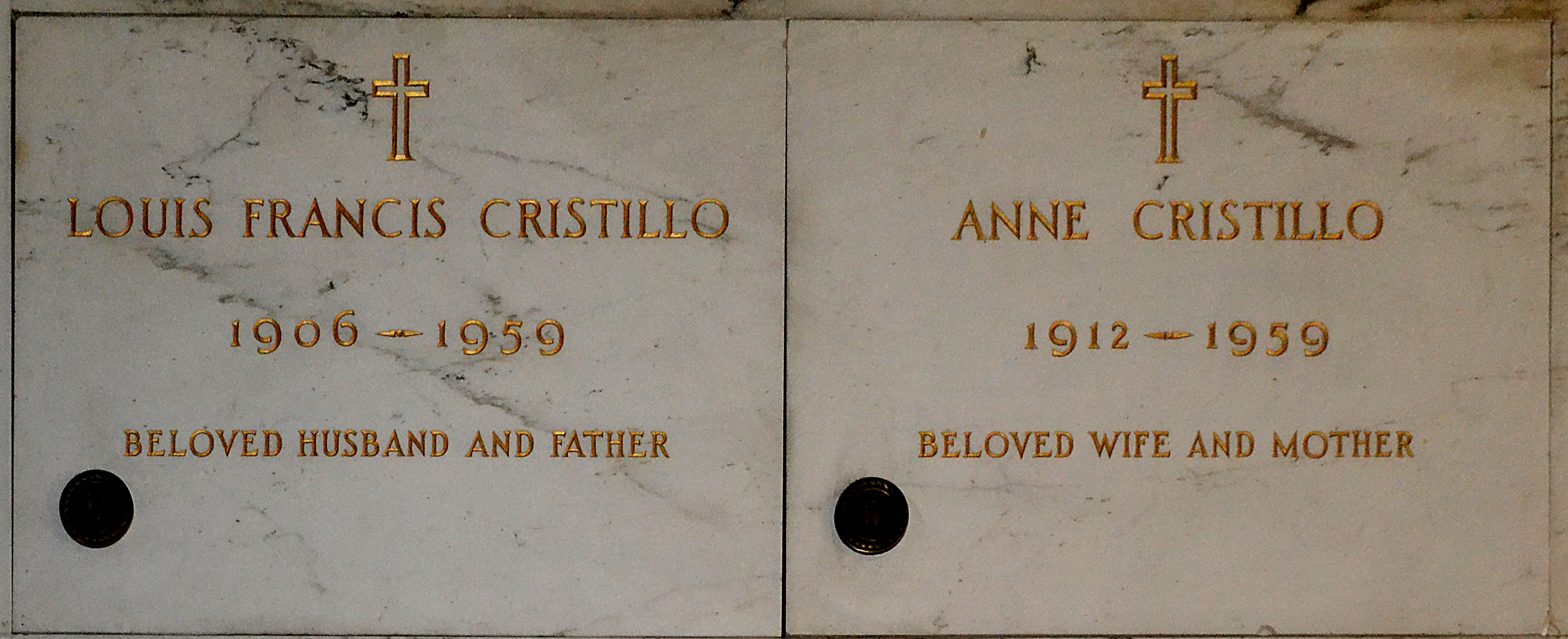
The crypts of Costello and his wife Anne

In February 1959, shortly after completing The 30 Foot Bride of Candy Rock, his only film without Abbott, Costello suffered a heart attack and was hospitalized at Doctors Hospital in Beverly Hills, where he died on March 3, 1959, aged 52.

Sources differ on the circumstances of his last day and final words. According to some accounts, he told visitors that the strawberry ice cream soda that he had just finished was "the best I ever tasted" and then died. By other reports, including those of several contemporaneous obituaries, the ice-cream soda exchange had occurred earlier in the day. Later, after his wife and friends had departed, he asked his nurse to adjust his position in bed just before suffering a fatal heart attack.

After a funeral Mass at his Catholic parish, St. Francis de Sales in Sherman Oaks, Costello was interred at the Calvary Cemetery in East Los Angeles on March 8. His wife Anne died from an apparent heart attack nine months later on December 5, 1959, at age 47.

== Family ==
On January 30, 1934, Costello married Anne Battler, a burlesque chorus dancer. Their first child, Patricia "Paddy" Costello, was born in 1936, followed by Carole on December 23, 1938, and Lou Jr. (nicknamed "Butch") on November 6, 1942, who died in a drowning incident a year later. Their last child, Christine, was born on August 15, 1947.

Costello's elder brother Pat Costello was a musician who led his own band before moving to Hollywood, where he was enlisted to perform stunts in Lou's place in the first ten Abbott and Costello films. He later appeared in a supporting role in Mexican Hayride (1948).

Costello's sister Marie Katherine Cristillo (1912–1988) was married to actor Joe Kirk (Nat Curcuruto), who portrayed Mr. Bacciagalupe on the Abbott and Costello radio and television shows and appeared in supporting roles in several of the team's films.

Costello's daughter Carole appeared in uncredited baby roles in a few Abbott and Costello films. She would later become a contestant coordinator for the game show Card Sharks as well as a nightclub singer. She died of a stroke on March 29, 1987, aged 48, while married to Craig Martin, eldest son of Dean Martin. Carole's daughter Marki Costello is an actress, director and producer in film and television.

Costello's daughter Chris published a biography titled Lou's on First in 1981.

== Memorials ==
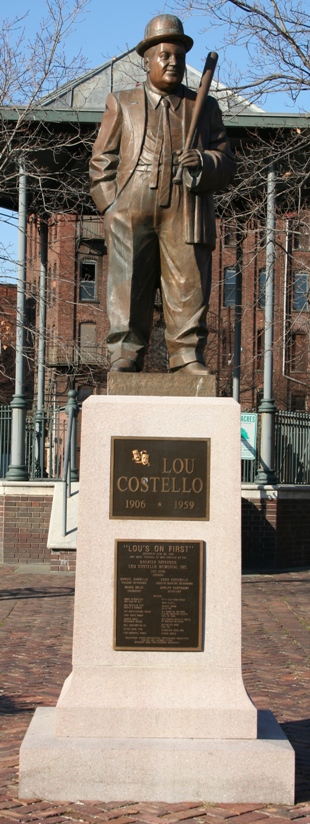
The Lou Costello statue in Paterson, New Jersey

In 1946, Costello was joined by Abbott to fund the Lou Costello Jr. Youth Foundation, a 3.3-acre recreation center on Olympic Blvd. in the Boyle Heights district of Los Angeles. Opened on May 3, 1947, it included a baseball field and swimming pool. In 1951 the center was sold to the city for less than one-third of its cost, and the name was changed to the Lou Costello Jr. Youth Recreation Center.

On June 26, 1992, the city of Paterson, New Jersey, in conjunction with the Lou Costello Memorial Association, erected a statue of Costello in the newly named Lou Costello Memorial Park in the city's historic downtown section. It shows Costello holding a baseball bat, a reference to the team's most famous routine, "Who's on First?" The statue has been shown in two episodes of The Sopranos and in the film Paterson (2016). In 2005, Madison Street, in the Sandy Hill section of Paterson where Costello was born, was renamed Lou Costello Place.

The centennial of Costello's birth was celebrated in Paterson in March 2006. From June 24 to 26, 2006, the Fort Lee Film Commission held a centennial film retrospective at the Fine Arts Theatre in Hollywood. Films screened included the premiere of a digital film produced by the teenagers of the present-day Lou Costello Jr. Recreation Center in East Los Angeles. Also premiered was a 35 mm restored print of the Costello-produced 1948 short film 10,000 Kids and a Cop, which was shot at the Lou Costello Jr. Youth Center in East Los Angeles.

In 2009, Costello was inducted into the New Jersey Hall of Fame.

Abbott and Costello are among the few non-baseball personnel to be memorialized in the Baseball Hall of Fame, although they are not formal inductees. A plaque and a gold record of the "Who's on First?" sketch have been on permanent display there since 1956, and a video of the routine loops endlessly in the exhibit area.

== Radio ==
Year	Title	Role	Notes
1938–1940	The Kate Smith Hour	Costello	
1940–1949	The Abbott and Costello Show	Costello	
1947–1949	The Abbott and Costello Children's Show	Costello	

== Filmography ==
Year	Film	Role	Notes
1927	The Battle of the Century		Ringside Extra
1927	The Taxi Dancer		Extra
1927	The Fair Co-Ed		Extra
1928	Rose-Marie		Lost film Extra
1928	Circus Rookies		Lost film Extra
1928	The Cossacks		Extra
1928	The Trail of '98		Stunt Double and Extra
1940	One Night in the Tropics	Costello	Film debut of Abbott and Costello
1941	Buck Privates	Herbie Brown	
1941	In the Navy	Pomeroy Watson	
1941	Hold That Ghost	Ferdinand Jones	
1941	Keep 'Em Flying	Heathcliffe	
1942	Ride 'Em Cowboy	Willoughby	
1942	Rio Rita	Wishy Dunn	
1942	Pardon My Sarong	Wellington Phlug	
1942	Who Done It?	Mervyn Milgrim	
1943	It Ain't Hay	Wilbur Hoolihan	
1943	Hit The Ice	Tubby McCoy	
1944	In Society	Albert Mansfield	
1944	Lost in a Harem	Harvey Garvey	
1945	Here Come the Co-Eds	Oliver Quackenbush	
1945	The Naughty Nineties	Sebastian Dinwiddie	
1945	Abbott and Costello in Hollywood	Abercrombie	
1946	Little Giant	Benny Miller	
1946	The Time of Their Lives	Horatio Prim	
1947	Buck Privates Come Home	Herbie Brown	Sequel to Buck Privates
1947	The Wistful Widow of Wagon Gap	Chester Wooley	
1948	The Noose Hangs High	Tommy Hinchcliffe	
1948	Abbott and Costello Meet Frankenstein	Wilbur Grey	
1948	Mexican Hayride	Joe Bascom/Humphrey Fish	
1948	10,000 Kids and a Cop	Himself	Documentary short
1949	Africa Screams	Stanley Livingston	
1949	Abbott and Costello Meet the Killer, Boris Karloff	Freddie Phillips	
1950	Abbott and Costello in the Foreign Legion	Lou Hotchkiss	
1951	Abbott and Costello Meet the Invisible Man	Lou Francis	
1951	Comin' Round the Mountain	Wilbert Smith	
1952	Jack and the Beanstalk	Jack	In color; producer
1952	Lost in Alaska	George Bell	
1952	Abbott and Costello Meet Captain Kidd	Oliver "Puddin' Head" Johnson	In color
1953	Abbott and Costello Go to Mars	Orville	
1953	Abbott and Costello Meet Dr. Jekyll and Mr. Hyde	Tubby	
1955	Abbott and Costello Meet the Keystone Kops	Willie Piper	
1955	Abbott and Costello Meet the Mummy	Freddie Franklin	
1956	Dance with Me, Henry	Lou Henry	
1959	The 30 Foot Bride of Candy Rock	Artie Pinsetter	Only starring film without Abbott; released posthumously
1965	The World of Abbott and Costello	–	Compilation film

== Television ==
Year	Title	Role	Notes
1951–1955	The Colgate Comedy Hour	Costello	Rotating hosts
1952–1954	The Abbott and Costello Show	Costello	52 episodes
1956–1958	The Steve Allen Show	Himself	7 episodes
1956	This Is Your Life	Himself	
1957	I've Got a Secret	Himself	
1958	General Electric Theater	Neal Andrews	episode: Blaze of Glory
1958	Wagon Train	Tobias Jones	episode: The Tobias Jones Story
