= In the Navy (film) =

1941 American film directed by Arthur Lubin

- Theatrical release poster
- Directed by: Arthur Lubin
- Written by: Arthur T. Horman; John Grant
- Produced by: Alex Gottlieb
- Starring: Bud Abbott; Lou Costello; Dick Powell; The Andrews Sisters
- Cinematography: Joseph A. Valentine
- Edited by: Philip Cahn
- Music by: Charles Previn
- Production company: Universal Pictures
- Distributed by: Universal Pictures
- Release date: May 30, 1941
- Running time: 85 minutes
- Country: United States
- Language: English
- Budget: $379,207.42
- Box office: $2 million (est.)

In the Navy is a 1941 American comedy film directed by Arthur Lubin and starring the team of Abbott and Costello alongside Dick Powell, Claire Dodd and The Andrews Sisters. Produced and distributed by Universal Pictures, it was the second service comedy based on the peacetime draft of 1940. The comedy team appeared in two other service comedies in 1941, before the United States entered the war: Buck Privates released in January and Keep 'Em Flying released in November.

== Plot ==
Popular crooner Russ Raymond abandons his career at its peak and joins the Navy using his real name, Tommy Halstead. However, Dorothy Roberts, a reporter, discovers his identity and follows him in the hopes of photographing him and revealing his identity to the world.

Aboard the battleship Alabama, Tommy meets up with Smokey and Pomeroy, who help hide him from Dorothy, who hatches numerous schemes in an attempt to photograph Tommy/Russ being a sailor. Pomeroy is in love with Patty Andrews, sends her numerous fan letters, and tries to impress her with false tales of his physique and his naval rank. Eventually, Patty discovers that Pomeroy is only a baker, and Pomeroy spends much of the movie attempting to win her affection.

== Cast ==
- Bud Abbott as Smokey Adams
- Lou Costello as Pomeroy Watson
- Dick Powell as Thomas Halstead
- Claire Dodd as Dorothy Roberts
- The Andrews Sisters as Themselves
- Dick Foran as Dynamite Dugan
- Billy Lenhart as Butch
- Kenneth Brown as Buddy
- Shemp Howard as Dizzy

== Production ==
After Buck Privates became a big hit, the studio rushed Abbott and Costello into a second service comedy. In the Navy was filmed from April 8, 1941, through May 9, 1941. This was actually after the team had already completed Hold That Ghost. The latter was held back for revisions and the naval comedy was released as the team's second starring vehicle.

There was, however, one problem before it could be released: when the film was screened for the Navy, officers were offended by the sequence where Pomeroy (Costello) impersonates a captain and puts the battleship through a series of madcap maneuvers. Since the sequence was the climax of the film, it could not be edited out. The studio solved the problem by making the sequence Pomeroy's dream. This caused the film to go over its original budget of $335,000.

Portions of the film were shot in the Coachella Valley, California.

== Routines ==
Abbott and Costello perform the "Lemon Bit", a crooked shell game routine; the math routine, "13 x 7 = 28"; and "Buzzing the Bee" (a variation called "Sons of Neptune"), an initiation routine where each member of the team tries to trick the other into asking to be sprayed in the face. During this sequence, Costello began laughing and spit his water on the deck. Director Arthur Lubin left it in the film.

== Reception ==
Reviews from critics were positive. Bosley Crowther of The New York Times wrote: "Maybe they aren't quite as funny as they were in Buck Privates, but even fair with Abbott and Costello is good enough for now ... Yes, the boys make something of In the Navy in spite of the fact that there is very little there. Certainly the Andrews Sisters and Mr. Powell, with their flat songs, would not be missed. They simply get in the way when you want to be watching Lou and Bud, who are the show." A reviewer in Variety reported that "Abbott and Costello provide constant laughs with their zany routines." Film Daily wrote, "The picture is timely, tuneful and highly amusing screenfare for all audiences." Harrison's Reports wrote: "It may not be as hilarious as 'Buck Privates' since some of the gags are already known; yet it is a very good comedy, with many amusing situations."

== Re-release ==
In the Navy was re-released in January 1949 with Who Done It?.

== Home media ==
This film has been released three times on DVD. Originally released as single DVD on August 26, 1998, it was released twice as part of two different Abbott and Costello collections. The first time, on The Best of Abbott and Costello Volume One, on February 10, 2004, and again on October 28, 2008, as part of Abbott and Costello: The Complete Universal Pictures Collection.
