= Mexican Hayride =

1948 film by Charles Barton

- Theatrical release poster
- Directed by: Charles Barton
- Written by: John Grant; Oscar Brodney
- Based on: Mexican Hayride; 1944 musiical by Herbert Fields; Dorothy Fields
- Produced by: Robert Arthur
- Starring: Bud Abbott; Lou Costello; Virginia Grey; Luba Malina; John Hubbard
- Cinematography: Charles Van Enger
- Edited by: Frank Gross
- Music by: Walter Scharf
- Distributed by: Universal-International
- Release date: December 27, 1948
- Running time: 77 minutes
- Country: United States
- Language: English
- Budget: $1,032,218
- Box office: $2.2 million

Mexican Hayride is a 1948 film starring the comedy team of Abbott and Costello. The film is based on Cole Porter's Broadway musical Mexican Hayride starring Bobby Clark. No songs from the stage musical were used in the film.

== Plot ==
Joe Bascomb chases con man Harry Lambert to Mexico City, after Harry apparently swindled him (and some friends) in an oil stock scam back in the United States. Joe's ex-girlfriend, Mary has hired Harry as her agent, and is going by the name 'Montana', passing herself off as a toreador. When Joe encounters Harry at a bullring arena, he also sees Mary, who is in the ring. As part of 'Amigo Americana Week', she is about to toss her hat into the crowd where the lucky recipient will be proclaimed 'goodwill ambassador'. Mary is supposed to toss the hat to Gus Adamson, another con man whom Harry has arranged to be chosen, but Mary instead throws the hat in anger at Joe. It turns out that Joe, now the 'goodwill ambassador', is also being pursued by American authorities for partaking in the oil stock scam; he uses an alias, 'Humphrey Fish', while in Mexico.

Joe is persuaded to participate in Harry's, Dagmar's and Mary's plan to sell fake silver mine stock. While giving tours of the bogus mine, Joe extols its beauty and sells stock to anyone he can. Eventually the authorities track down and incarcerate Joe, along with Harry; Joe manages to escape and, disguised as an old Mexican woman, helps Harry escape. They return to the bullring in search of Dagmar and the stock money. Joe enters the ring, only to be chased by an irate bull. Dagmar, who has the money concealed in her hat, tosses it to him. Harry enters the ring to retrieve the hat from Joe, who is still being pursued by the bull. Eventually, the money is recovered and returned to the authorities. The gang is cleared of wrongdoing involving the silver mine, but are not yet cleared in their oil stock scam back in the States. Dagmar makes reparations for those charges as well, and they are free to return home.

== Cast ==
- Bud Abbott as Harry Lambert
- Lou Costello as Joe Bascom/Humphrey Fish
- Virginia Grey as Montana
- Luba Malina as Dagmar
- John Hubbard as David Winthrop
- Pedro de Cordoba as Senor Martinez
- Fritz Feld as Professor Ganzmeyer
- Tom Powers as Ed Mason
- Pat Costello as Tim Williams
- Frank Fenton as Gus Adamson
- Chris Pin Martin as Mariachi Leader
- Sidney Fields as Reporter
- Flores Brothers Trio as Trio

== Production ==
Mexican Hayride was filmed from June 11 through August 12, 1948. Early plans for production called for the film to be made in Technicolor.

Both Costello and Abbott objected to the making of this film. Costello wanted a different cast, including Carmen Miranda and Lucille Ball, while Abbott simply hated the script. They were both suspended for a week, and filming began only two days behind schedule.

Costello's brother Pat plays one of the detectives on his trail. In one scene ("Like you?" "Like me!"), the physical description of Costello's character Joe Bascom is compared with that of the detective, noting several similarities.

The Cole Porter song "I Love You" sung by Virginia Grey and John Hubbard was filmed but cut from the released movie.

== Routines ==
- At the beginning of the film, when Joe catches up with Harry, Joe says, "Who told me there was oil in my backyard? Who got me to sell phoney stock to my friends? Who ran away with the money? Who got Mary mad at me? And if you're tired of hearing 'Who', I got a 'What' for you... on second base!", which is a reference to the comedy duo's famous routine, Who's on First?.
- Silver Ore, in which Abbott tries to teach Costello about how jewelry is made ("Or what?")
- Sidney Fields appears as a reporter interviewing Costello, who never lets Costello get a word in.
- Fritz Feld appears as a speech therapist advising Costello in the art of speaking, resulting in humor.

== Home media ==
This film has been released twice on DVD. The first time, on The Best of Abbott and Costello Volume Three, on August 3, 2004, and again on October 28, 2008, as part of Abbott and Costello: The Complete Universal Pictures Collection.
