= Abbott and Costello in Hollywood =

1945 film

- Theatrical release poster
- Directed by: S. Sylvan Simon
- Written by: Nat Perrin; Lou Breslow
- Produced by: Martin A. Gosch
- Starring: Bud Abbott; Lou Costello; Frances Rafferty; Robert Stanton; Jean Porter; Warner Anderson "Rags" Ragland; Mike Mazurki
- Cinematography: Charles Schoenbaum
- Edited by: Ben Lewis
- Music by: George Bassman
- Production company: Metro-Goldwyn-Mayer
- Distributed by: Loew's Inc.
- Release date: October 4, 1945 (U.S.)
- Running time: 83 minutes
- Country: United States
- Language: English

Abbott and Costello in Hollywood (Note: On screen title is Bud Abbott and Lou Costello in Hollywood.) is a 1945 American black-and-white comedy film directed by S. Sylvan Simon and starring the comedy team of Abbott and Costello alongside Frances Rafferty. Made by Metro-Goldwyn-Mayer, it was produced by Martin A. Gosch.

== Plot ==
A barber, Buzz Curtis, and a porter, Abercrombie, work for a Hollywood salon. They are sent to the office of agent Norman Royce to give him a haircut and a shoeshine. On the way there they run into former co-worker Claire Warren, who is about to star as the lead in a new musical. At the same time her co-star Gregory LeMaise, whose fame is dwindling, arrives and invites her to join him at lunch. She declines, which angers him.

While at the agent's office Buzz and Abercrombie witness LeMaise enter and declare to Royce that he cannot work with Claire. Royce, who has just seen a young singer, Jeff Parker audition, fires LeMaise and offers the job to Parker. This causes LeMaise to change his mind, and Royce does as well, giving LeMaise his job back. Buzz and Abercrombie quickly switch careers and become Parker's agents, and head to the studio's chief, Mr. Kavanaugh, to find a role for Parker.

When they meet up with Kavanaugh, it is because they just crashed their car into his at the Mammoth Studios gate. Kavanaugh bans them from the lot, but they manage to sneak back in with a group of extras. Once inside they find themselves at the wardrobe department and Buzz gets dressed as a cop and Abercrombie as a tramp. They use their newfound disguises to roam the lot. Things do not work out well for Abercrombie. He wanders onto a movie set where a saloon brawl is being filmed and a scene calls for a mannequin to be thrown off a high balcony. Abercrombie, who can't give himself away by talking, ends up playing the part of the mannequin.

Later, Buzz and Abercrombie try to help Parker get the role by getting LeMaise out of the picture by trying to start a fight with him. Their plan is to photograph him hitting Abercrombie and then having him arrested. The plan goes off without a hitch until Abercrombie falls overboard after being hit and is feared drowned. LeMaise decides to hide, and Parker is given the role in his place. LeMaise eventually discovers that Abercrombie is still alive and chases him around the backlot. LeMaise eventually is caught, and Claire and Parker become famous when the film is successful. Subsequently, Buzz and Abercrombie become big-time agents in Hollywood.

== Cast ==
- Bud Abbott as Buzz Kurtis
- Lou Costello as Abercrombie
- Frances Rafferty as Claire Warren
- Bob Haymes as Jeff Parker (as Robert Stanton)
- Jean Porter as Ruthie
- Dean Stockwell as Dean
- Warner Anderson as Norman Royce
- Rags Ragland as himself (as 'Rags' Ragland)
- Mike Mazurki as Klondike Pete
- Carleton G. Young as Gregory LeMaise
- Donald MacBride as Dennis Kavanaugh
- Edgar Dearing as first studio cop
- Marion Martin as Miss Milbane
- Arthur Space as Director
- William Phillips as Kavanaugh's assistant, (as Wm. 'Bill' Phillips)
- The Lyttle Sisters as Singing Quartette at Ciro's (uncredited)
- Robert Emmett O'Connor as studio cop (uncredited)

== Production ==
Filming took place from April 10 through June 1, 1945, with some retakes filmed in July.

During production, Abbott and Costello returned to Universal Studios on May 13 for retakes on The Naughty Nineties (1945).

This is the last of three feature films that Abbott and Costello made on loan to Metro-Goldwyn-Mayer while under contract to Universal; the other two features were Rio Rita (1942) and Lost in a Harem (1944).

Many stars appear in the film as themselves, such as Lucille Ball, Rags Ragland, Preston Foster, and Dean Stockwell, and director Robert Z. Leonard.

The name of the production company in the film is Mammoth Studios, in an effort by the MGM "to cast itself, or versions of itself, in its own films".

== Routines performed ==
Insomnia is one of the routines that Abbott and Costello perform. Costello is unable to fall asleep, so Abbott gives him a record that is guaranteed to put anyone to sleep. However, no one is around to turn it off, and when the needle reaches the end, it starts skipping, which wakes him. Abbott agrees to stay awake to turn it off when it is over, but falls under the spell of the record and goes to sleep himself. They try again, this time with cotton in Abbott's ears (a sequence that was used in the MGM compilation film, (That's Entertainment, Part II). When this also fails, Costello ties a string from his foot to the record player. The thought is when he falls asleep, his foot will drop shutting off the machine, but instead it turns on the radio, which blasts a loud march!

== Reception ==
Bosley Crowther of The New York Times wrote: "Among the real rib-tickling sketches in this film the two high spots are Costello's schooling in the tonsorial art and his desperate battle to overcome insomnia. During these interludes his brilliant pantomimic talents are brought into full play. As for the rest, well, even half a laugh is better than none." Variety wrote: "An Abbott and Costello picture may not be an artistic triumph, but the duo certainly try hard enough to make audiences laugh. Their latest, Abbott and Costello in Hollywood, is no exception; it should do fairly good business." Harrison's Reports wrote that the film "should more than satisfy those who respond easily to [Abbott & Costello's] particular brand of slapstick humor."

== Home media ==
Warner Home Video released the film on DVD November 21, 2006, with Lost in a Harem (1944).
