= Ride 'Em Cowboy (1942 film) =

1942 film by Arthur Lubin

- Theatrical Poster
- Directed by: Arthur Lubin
- Written by: True Boardman; John Grant
- Produced by: Alex Gottlieb
- Starring: Bud Abbott; Lou Costello; Dick Foran; Anne Gwynne; Ella Fitzgerald
- Cinematography: John W. Boyle
- Edited by: Philip Cahn
- Music by: Frank Skinner
- Distributed by: Universal Pictures
- Release date: February 20, 1942
- Running time: 86 minutes
- Language: English
- Box office: $2 million (US rentals)

Ride 'Em Cowboy is a 1942 film starring the comedy team of Abbott and Costello, Dick Foran, Anne Gwynne, Johnny Mack Brown, Ella Fitzgerald (in her first film appearance), Samuel S. Hinds, Douglas Dumbrille, and Morris Ankrum, and directed by Arthur Lubin. The film focuses on Abbott and Costello as they play the role of two peanut vendors on the run from their boss. Despite their lack of knowledge in the trade, they get jobs as cowboys on a dude ranch. The film is set in the West.

== Plot ==
The author of best-selling Western novels, Bronco Bob Mitchell, has never set foot in the West. A newspaper article has exposed this fact to his fans, and his image is suffering because of it. He decides to make an appearance at a Long Island charity rodeo to bolster his image. When a steer escapes while he is riding a horse nearby, he is thrown. Not knowing what to do, a cowgirl, Anne Shaw, comes to his rescue and saves his life by bulldogging the steer.

During the rescue, she is injured and cannot compete and loses her chance to win the $10,000 prize. Although Bob is grateful, she quickly becomes angry due to his city-slicker hotshot personality and returns to her father's dude ranch in Arizona. Bob follows her with the hopes of making amends, and actually learns how to be a real cowboy.

Meanwhile, Willoughby and Duke are vendors at the rodeo. They are not very good at their job, and soon cause enough havoc that they hide from their boss. Their hiding place winds up being a cattle car, and they soon find themselves on their way out west. When they arrive, Willoughby accidentally shoots an arrow into an Indian tepee. Custom says that this is a proposal, but Willoughby and Duke soon run in fear when the Indian maiden inside the tent turns out to be plump and unattractive. They wind up at the same dude ranch where Anne and Bob are at, and they are soon given jobs by the foreman, Alabam'.

Anne concedes and begins to instruct Bob on the ways of cowboy life, while Willoughby and Duke are still menaced by the Indians. Eventually, Anne decides that Bob has improved enough to enter him on their team at the state rodeo championship. Unfortunately, a gambler, Ace Henderson, has made large bets against the ranch and has his gang kidnap Bob and Alabam'. Willoughby and Duke unwittingly come to the rescue while they are running from the Indians, and everyone returns to the rodeo in time. Bob, finally a true cowboy, rides a bronco long enough to win the championship. The Indians catch up to Willoughby there, but as a joke, his bride turns out to be Duke.

== Cast ==
- Bud Abbott as Duke
- Lou Costello as Willoughby
- Dick Foran as Bronco Bob Mitchell
- Anne Gwynne as Anne Shaw
- Johnny Mack Brown as Alabam' Brewster
- Judd McMichael as Tom (as The Merry Macs)
- Ted McMichael as Harry (as The Merry Macs)
- Joe McMichael as Dick (as The Merry Macs)
- Mary Lou Cook as Dotty Davis (as The Merry Macs)
- Ella Fitzgerald as Ruby
- Samuel S. Hinds as Sam Shaw
- Douglass Dumbrille as Jake Rainwater
- Morris Ankrum as Ace Anderson

== Music and dance ==
Ella Fitzgerald, in her first screen role, plays Ruby, who fills several roles as one of the employees of the ranch. At the opening rodeo, she is dressed as a rodeo clown and comes to Anne's side when she is hurt. Later in the film, she can be seen removing an apron before singing. Ella sings "A-Tisket, A-Tasket" in the bus, as the ranch crew drives from the railway station to the ranch. Ruby and the other employees interact playfully during the song.

The film also introduced the song "I'll Remember April", sung by Dick Foran. During the 1950s and 1960s, the song became a favorite of jazz musicians based on chord changes that particularly lent themselves to improvisation.

Musical numbers were staged by Nick Castle.

== Routines ==
The burlesque routine, "Crazy House", appears in the film where Costello enters a sanitarium for "peace and quiet", only to have his rest disturbed by a succession of bizarre visitors. This version is presented as a dream sequence in which all the people he encounters are dressed as Indians.

== Production ==
Ride 'Em Cowboy was filmed from June 30-August 9, 1941, on location at both the B-Bar A and the Rancho Chihuahua dude ranches. It was originally intended to be the third starring film for Abbott and Costello, but its production was delayed so that the team could make In the Navy, and then its release was delayed so that Keep 'Em Flying could be filmed and released. Dorothy Dandridge appears in the film as a dancer (uncredited). The song "Cow-Cow Boogie" (written by Bennie Carter) was cut from film, but it was later sung in a Dandridge short film of the same name.

== Release ==
The film was the eighth-biggest hit of 1942.

Ride 'Em Cowboy was re-released with Keep 'Em Flying in 1949, and Who Done It? in 1954 by Realart Pictures.

A 10-minute segment of Ride 'Em Cowboy was released as No Indians, Please by Castle Films in the 1940s and '50s.

== Home media ==
This film has been released twice on DVD. The first was on The Best of Abbott and Costello Volume One, on February 10, 2004, and again on October 28, 2008, as part of Abbott and Costello: The Complete Universal Pictures Collection.
