= It Ain't Hay =

1943 film by Erle C. Kenton

- Theatrical release poster
- Directed by: Erle C. Kenton
- Written by: Damon Runyon; Allen Boretz; John Grant
- Produced by: Alex Gottlieb
- Starring: Bud Abbott; Lou Costello; Grace McDonald; Cecil Kellaway; Eugene Pallette
- Cinematography: Charles Van Enger
- Edited by: Frank Gross
- Music by: Harry Revel
- Distributed by: Universal Pictures
- Release date: March 10, 1943
- Running time: 80 min
- Country: United States
- Language: English
- Box office: $1.6 million (US rentals)

It Ain't Hay is a 1943 film starring the comedy team of Abbott and Costello.

== Plot ==
Cab driver Wilbur Hoolihan accidentally kills a hack horse owned by King O'Hara and his daughter, Princess O’Hara, by feeding it candy. In hopes of raising enough money to replace it, he and his friend Grover Mockridge visit a crooked gambling parlor. They win enough money, but before they can purchase a new horse, a con man swindles Wilbur out of the cash. Some touts inform Wilbur and Grover that an old horse is available for free at one of the upstate tracks. They visit the track but mistakenly take the wrong horse, a champion by the name of Tea Biscuit, and present the horse to O'Hara.

Tea Biscuit's owner, Col. Brainard, offers a reward for the return of the horse. By this time, O'Hara has taken a fare up to Saratoga. Wilbur and Grover, realizing their error, drive to Saratoga to find O'Hara. The three touts also realize that Wilbur and Grover took Tea Biscuit, and trail them hoping to recover the horse and collect the reward. Wilbur and Grover manage to find O'Hara and hide Tea Biscuit in their hotel room, but they are hounded by the house detective, Warner, who was tipped off by the touts. Fleeing Warner, Wilbur rides the horse but ends up at the track in time for a big race. The three touts and Warner converge on the track and confront Grover, who makes a deal with them to turn over the horse Wilbur riding for $100. Grover then uses that money to bet on Tea Biscuit. Before the race, Wilbur is thrown off Tea Biscuit and lands on Rhubarb, and Rhubarb's jockey saddles up Tea Biscuit. With a real jockey aboard, Tea Biscuit wins the race while Wilbur and Rhubarb come in last. Warner and the touts take Wilbur's horse, which they believe is Tea Biscuit, to Col. Brainard for the reward, but it is the wrong horse. Grover holds the only winning ticket on Tea Biscuit, and uses the windfall to buy O'Hara a replacement horse.

== Cast ==
- Bud Abbott as Grover Mockridge
- Lou Costello as Wilbur Hoolihan
- Grace McDonald as Kitty McGloin
- Cecil Kellaway as King O'Hara
- Eugene Pallette as Gregory Warner
- Patsy O'Connor as Peggy / Princess O'Hara
- Leighton Noble as Pvt. Joe Collins
- Shemp Howard as Umbrella Sam
- Samuel S. Hinds as Col. Brainard
- Eddie Quillan as Harry the Horse
- Richard Lane as Slicker
- Andrew Tombes as Big-Hearted Charlie
- Wade Boteler as Reilly
- Selmer Jackson as Grant
- The Four Step Brothers
- The Vagabonds
- Mike Mazurki as Bouncer (Uncredited)
- Herb Vigran as Man in the Back Room (Uncredited)
- Pierre Watkin as Major Harper (Uncredited)

== Production ==
It Ain't Hay is based upon the Damon Runyon story, Princess O'Hara, which Universal first made into a film in 1935 with Chester Morris.

Filming of this picture began on September 28, 1942, and lasted until November 11. Lou's brother Pat Costello was used as his stunt-double in the "headless horseman" sequence.

It was during production, on November 6, that Lou's wife Anne gave birth to their son, Lou "Butch" Costello Jr.

== Fourth wall ==
There is a scene that breaks the fourth wall: Wilbur and Grover are in their apartment when someone knocks at the door. Grover says, "Go answer the door, it might be Warner." Wilbur answers, "It won't do no good, we're signed up with Universal." Abbott and Costello had a long-term contract with Universal Pictures at the time. Also, in the beginning of the movie, someone asks Shemp Howard's character why he's carrying an umbrella when it isn't raining. He answers, "Who knows? I'm a Damon Runyon character."

== Home media ==
It Ain't Hay was released on DVD on October 28, 2008, as part of Abbott and Costello: The Complete Universal Pictures Collection. The film's studio-authorized DVD release had been delayed for many years due to legal issues with the estate of Damon Runyon.

== See also ==
- List of films about horses
- List of films about horse racing
