= Buck Privates =

1941 film by Arthur Lubin

- Theatrical release poster
- Directed by: Arthur Lubin
- Written by: Arthur T. Horman
- Produced by: Alex Gottlieb
- Starring: Bud Abbott; Lou Costello; Lee Bowman; The Andrews Sisters
- Cinematography: Milton R. Krasner; Jerome Ash
- Edited by: Philip Cahn
- Music by: Charles Previn
- Production company: Universal Pictures
- Distributed by: Universal Pictures
- Release date: January 31, 1941
- Running time: 84 minutes
- Country: United States
- Language: English
- Budget: $245,000
- Box office: $4,000,000 (USA)

Buck Privates is a 1941 American musical military comedy film directed by Arthur Lubin that turned Bud Abbott and Lou Costello into bona fide movie stars. It was the first service comedy based on the peacetime draft of 1940. The comedy team made two more service comedies before the United States entered the war (In the Navy and Keep 'Em Flying). A sequel to this movie, Buck Privates Come Home, was released in 1947. Buck Privates is one of three Abbott and Costello films featuring The Andrews Sisters, who were also under contract to Universal Pictures at the time.

Abbott and Costello performed a one-hour radio adaptation of the film on the Lux Radio Theatre on October 13, 1941.

== Plot ==
Slicker Smith and Herbie Brown are sidewalk peddlers who hawk neckties out of a suitcase. Chased by a cop, they duck into a movie theater, not realizing that it is now being used as an Army enlistment center. Believing that they are signing up for theater prizes, they accidentally enlist.

Meanwhile, spoiled playboy Randolph Parker and his long-suffering valet, Bob Martin, also report to the theater. Randolph expects his influential father to pull some strings so he can avoid military service. Bob, on the other hand, takes his military obligations in stride. Tensions between the two men escalate further with the introduction of Judy Gray, a camp hostess and a friend of Bob's upon whom Randolph sets his sights.

At boot camp, Slicker and Herbie are mortified to discover that Collins, the policeman who chased them, is now their sergeant. Randolph, meanwhile, learns that his father will not use his influence on his behalf, believing that a year in the Army will do Randolph some good. For all the difficulties, camp life isn't so bad, since The Andrews Sisters appear at regular intervals to sing sentimental or patriotic tunes (including "Boogie Woogie Bugle Boy") and Herbie continues to foul up with little consequence.

Although he is an expert marksman, Randolph skips an army shooting match in order to spend the afternoon with Judy. The company loses the match and all the money they had bet on him, causing them to resent him even more. However, during a war game exercise, Randolph redeems himself by saving Bob and coming up with a ruse to win the sham battle for his company. He is finally accepted by his unit and wins Bob's and Judy's admiration in the process. When he learns that he's been accepted to Officer Training School, he initially refuses, believing that his father's political influence was responsible. However, his commanding officer assures him that his training record and recommendations from his superiors factored in the decision. Bob has also been offered an appointment to OTS, and Judy announces that she will be joining them there as a hostess. Meanwhile, Smitty and Herbie accept Collins' invitation to shoot dice, but Herbie ends up (literally) losing his pants.

== Cast ==
- Bud Abbott as Slicker Smith
- Lou Costello as Herbie Brown
- Lee Bowman as Randolph Parker III
- Jane Frazee as Judy Gray
- Alan Curtis as Bob Martin
- Nat Pendleton as Sgt. Michael Collins
- The Andrews Sisters as Themselves
- Samuel S. Hinds as Maj. Gen. Emerson
- Harry Strang as Sgt. Callahan
- Nella Walker as Mrs. Karen Parker
- Shemp Howard as Chef
- Don Raye as Dick
- Hughie Prince as Henry

== Production ==
Buck Privates was filmed from December 13, 1940, through January 11, 1941. It was originally budgeted at $233,000 over 20 days; in the end it was $12,000 over budget and four days over schedule. The film was originally conceived as a straight military story with Lee Bowman, Alan Curtis, and Jane Frazee in a romantic triangle, and Bud Abbott and Lou Costello offering comedy relief, as they had in their previous film One Night in the Tropics. When it became clear that Abbott and Costello were really the focal point of Buck Privates, they became the stars of the film. The "cast of characters" credits, after the end title, were filmed before the emphasis was shifted to Abbott and Costello, so Lee Bowman was billed first, as originally intended.

The "drill routine", where Smitty tries to get Herbie and other soldiers to march in formation, had been performed by Abbott and Costello on stage for more than three years, where it lasted about two-and-a-half minutes. Director Arthur Lubin and film editor Arthur Hilton, recognizing the potential for a major comedy scene, combined footage from all the various takes—in which Abbott and Costello never performed the same way twice—and extended the drill routine into a five-minute sketch that became a highlight of the finished feature. Abbott and Costello were amazed when they saw the scene on film; they were so accustomed to the shorter, two-minute sketch that they couldn't believe how cleverly it had been amplified.

Lubin recalled the film "was very strange to shoot because they didn't go by much of a shooting script. Being burlesque comedians they just did their old routines. They would say 'This routine is "Spit in the Bush".'... And they would have to act it for me and show it what it was. The entire first script was a series of titled gags. I would just say 'We'll take a close up here and a two shot here'. I never interfered. There were was nothing I could do because these were tried and true old burlesque things that they and their forefathers and their forefathers, probably since the Greek period, had done."

The character Judy mentions that her father was a captain in the "Fighting 69", a reference to The Fighting 69th.

== Reception ==
Director Arthur Lubin recalled, "The studio was a little uncertain about how they were going to be accepted. But at the first preview the audience just died. Buck Privates was a very, very funny show. And, actually, I must say it was very little credit to the director. It consisted mainly of fabulous gags that these two wonderful guys knew from years and years of being in burlesque."

Universal had already sold Buck Privates to exhibitors as a low-priced "B" feature, rented to theaters for a flat fee instead of a percentage of the ticket sales. This became an embarrassing mistake when the film went on to become Universal's biggest moneymaker of the year, grossing over $4 million at the box office at a time when movie tickets averaged 25 cents. Because of the flat-fee rentals, the studio had surrendered much of the profits to the theaters. Universal began promoting Abbott and Costello as a major attraction, and from then on sold their films as "A" features commanding higher prices and profits. Universal gave director Lubin, who was under contract at a fixed salary, a $5,000 bonus and told him to start on another film, Hold That Ghost. Lubin directed five Abbott and Costello films in ten months.

=== Critical ===
The film received positive reviews from critics. Theodore Strauss of The New York Times called it "an hour and a half of uproarious monkeyshines. Army humor isn't apt to be subtle and neither are Abbott and Costello. Their antics have as much innuendo as a 1,000-pound bomb but nearly as much explosive force."

The reviewer for Variety wrote: "Geared at a zippy pace, and providing lusty and enthusiastic comedy of the broadest slapstick, Buck Privates is a hilarious laugh concoction that will click solidly in the general runs for profitable biz."

Film Daily enthused: "If ever a 'sleeper' appeared out of Hollywood, this is it ... the attraction is a grand, madcap musical which packs a whale of a wallop for the general public liking laughs galore on the frankly slapstick side."

Harrison's Reports described it as "A good comedy for the masses ... Abbott and Costello definitely establish themselves as a comedy team that should win wide popularity."

== Award nominations ==
The film received two Academy Award nominations in 1941. Hughie Prince and Don Raye were nominated for the Academy Award for Best Original Song for "Boogie Woogie Bugle Boy" and Charles Previn was nominated for the Academy Award for Original Music Score (Scoring of a Musical Picture).

== World War II ==
Japan used this film as propaganda to demonstrate to its own troops the "incompetence" of the United States Army. The film was shown to U.S. troops in every theater of war.

== Rerelease ==
It was re-released in 1948, and again on a double bill with Keep 'Em Flying by Realart Pictures in 1953 during the Korean War.

== Andrews Sisters ==
The Andrews Sisters perform four songs in the film: "You're a Lucky Fellow, Mr. Smith", "Boogie Woogie Bugle Boy", "Bounce Me Brother, With a Solid Four", and "(I'll Be With You) In Apple Blossom Time". The composers of the first three of these songs, Don Raye and Hughie Prince, appear in the film as new recruits alongside Abbott and Costello. "Boogie Woogie Bugle Boy" was nominated for an Academy Award.

The studio was against using "(I'll Be With You) In Apple Blossom Time" because of fees demanded by the music publisher. The Andrews Sisters paid the fee themselves, and it went on to become one of their most requested songs.

"Bounce Me Brother, With a Solid Four" also features one of the more famous Lindy Hop dance sequences of the swing era. Many dancers from Los Angeles, including Dean Collins, Jewel McGowan, Ray Hirsch, and Patty Lacey, are featured.

== Home media ==
This film was released on VHS and Beta in 1983, then re-released on VHS in 1989 and again in 1991. It has been released three times on DVD, first as single DVD on April 1, 1998 OCLC 44543569, and later as part of two different Abbott and Costello collections. The first time, on The Best of Abbott and Costello Volume One, on February 10, 2004, and again on October 28, 2008, as part of Abbott and Costello: The Complete Universal Pictures Collection. A Blu-ray edition was released on April 17, 2012.
