= Who Done It? (1942 film) =

1942 film by Erle C. Kenton

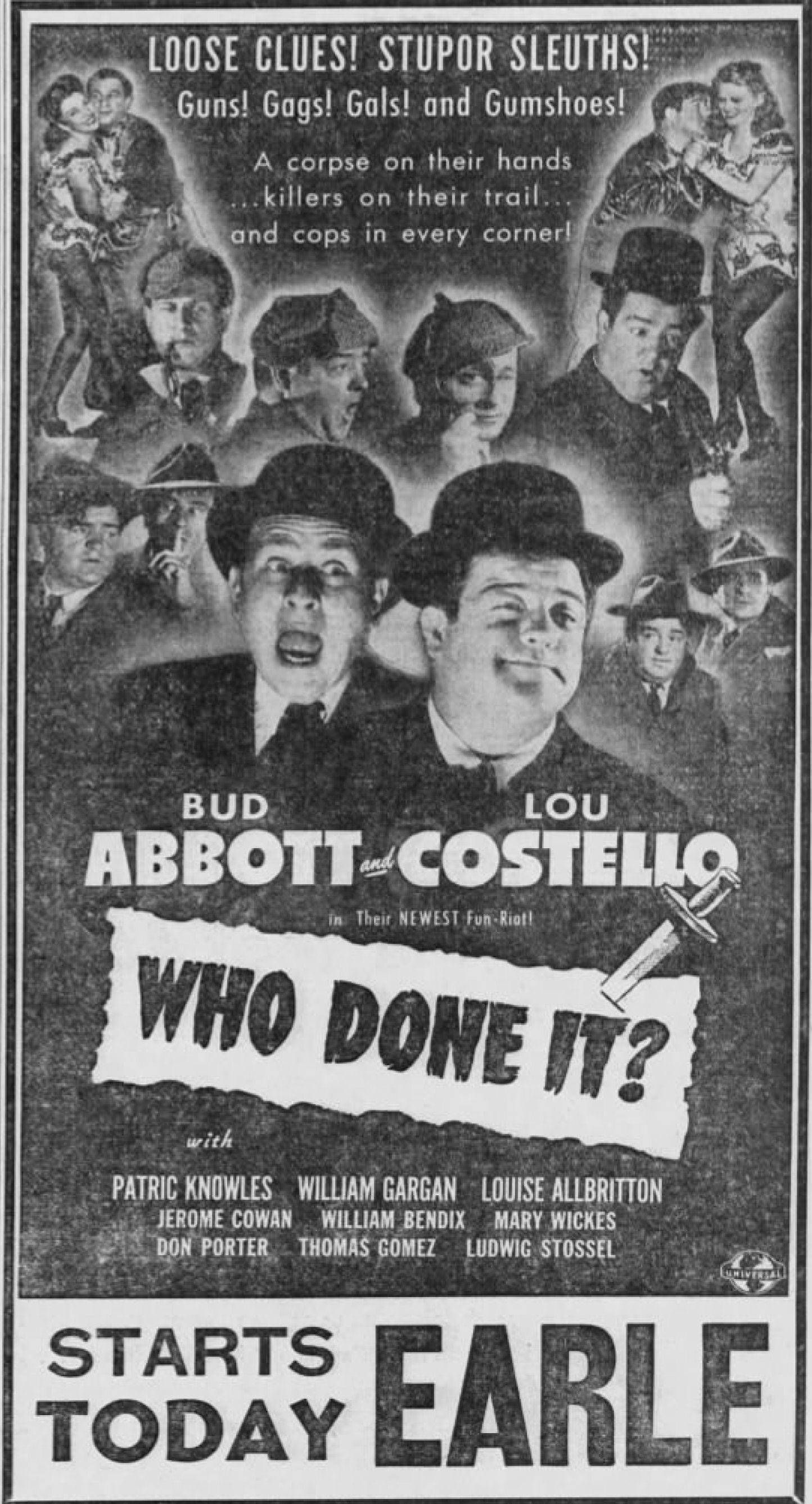
- Newspaper advertisement
- Directed by: Erle C. Kenton
- Written by: Stanley Roberts; Edmund Joseph; John Grant
- Produced by: Alex Gottlieb
- Starring: Bud Abbott; Lou Costello; Patric Knowles; William Gargan; Louise Allbritton; Jerome Cowan; William Bendix; Mary Wickes
- Cinematography: Charles Van Enger
- Edited by: Arthur Hilton
- Music by: Frank Skinner
- Distributed by: Universal Pictures
- Release date: November 6, 1942
- Running time: 76 minutes
- Country: United States
- Language: English
- Box office: $1,750,000 (US rentals)

Who Done It? is a 1942 American comedy-mystery film directed by Erle C. Kenton and starring Bud Abbott and Lou Costello. It is noteworthy as their first feature that contains no musical numbers.

== Plot ==
Chick Larkin and Mervyn Milgrim both work at the soda counter of a local radio station's headquarters. Their true passion, however, is to become writers on a radio mystery show. They attend a broadcast of the radio program Murder at Midnight along with one of the writers, Jimmy Turner, and the producer, Jane Little.

As the show begins, the network president, Colonel J.R. Andrews, is mysteriously electrocuted. Seeing this as an opportunity to become radio writers, Chick and Mervyn impersonate detectives and attempt to solve the crime with the help of Juliette Collins, who works for the station. Meanwhile, Moran and Branningan, two real detectives, consider the 'fake' detectives to be prime suspects. A prolonged chase ensues throughout the studio, and the body of Dr. Marek, Andrews' personal physician, is also discovered.

Larkin and Milgrim flee the studio, but hear on the radio that Milgrim has apparently won $10,000 on the Wheel of Fortune radio program. Larkin and Milgrim return to claim the prize, only to be arrested by the real detectives. Turner and Little, who have also been investigating, manage to convince everyone that there should be a full reenactment of the program that led to the murders, so that the true culprit might crack and be revealed.

An eavesdropping Nazi spy, who used the radio station to transmit information to his cohorts, attends the reenactment broadcast. It turns out that the spy murdered the Colonel and his physician because they found out about his illegal radio transmissions. During the broadcast, he loses his nerve and flees to the roof, where he is pursued by Larkin and Milgrim. After a struggle, Milgrim uses a slingshot to break the light bulbs that spell out the name "TOWNSEND PHELPS", causing the sign to now read "SEND HELP". The police arrive and the murderer is arrested.

== Cast ==
- Bud Abbott as Chick Larkin / Voice of Himself on Radio
- Lou Costello as Mervin Q. Milgrim / Voice of Himself on Radio
- Patric Knowles as Jimmy Turner
- William Gargan as Police Lt. Lou Moran
- Louise Allbritton as Jane Little
- Thomas Gomez as Col. J.R. Andrews
- William Bendix as Detective Brannigan
- Don Porter as Art Fraser
- Jerome Cowan as Marco Heller
- Mary Wickes as Juliet Collins
- Ludwig Stössel as Dr. Anton Marek

== Who's on first? ==
There are two references to the team's popular Who's on First? routine. During the murder scene, Abbott confuses Costello with the "volts-and-watts" routine. Lou bleats, "Next you'll be telling me Watt's on second base!"

Later, in the radio giveaway program scene, Bud and Lou tune the radio to a broadcast of their own Who's on First? routine, which they promptly turn off and, as an obvious inside joke, disparage.

The film originates the team's classic "Handcuff Bit" routine. In trying to show Costello how to properly apply handcuffs, Brannigan (William Bendix) ends up handcuffing himself while Costello taunts him. This routine was repeated in their 1952 television show and in ABBOTT AND COSTELLO MEET CAPTAIN KIDD; with Charles Laughton.

== Music ==
When Mervyn makes it to the Wheel Of Fortune radio program on time, he is greeted with an instrumental section of the song "You're A Lucky Fellow, Mr. Smith", featured in their film Buck Privates (appropriately enough, to celebrate the "lucky" winner).

== Release ==
After completion of this film, Abbott and Costello began a tour of the United States to help promote the selling of U.S. War Bonds.

Who Done It? was re-released in 1949 with Keep 'Em Flying, and in 1954 with Ride 'Em Cowboy.

=== Home media ===
This film has been released three times on VHS 1989, 1991 and 2000. It has also been released twice on DVD. The first time, on The Best of Abbott and Costello Volume One, on February 10, 2004, and again on October 28, 2008, as part of Abbott and Costello: The Complete Universal Pictures Collection.
