= The Naughty Nineties =

1945 American film by Jean Yarbrough

- Theatrical poster
- Directed by: Jean Yarbrough
- Written by: Edmund L. Hartmann; John Grant; Edmund Joseph; Hal Fimberg
- Produced by: John Grant; Edmund L. Hartmann
- Starring: Bud Abbott; Lou Costello; Alan Curtis; Rita Johnson
- Cinematography: George Robinson
- Edited by: Arthur Hilton
- Music by: Lloyd Akridge; Paul Dessau
- Distributed by: Universal Pictures
- Release date: June 20, 1945
- Running time: 76 minutes
- Country: United States
- Language: English

The Naughty Nineties is a 1945 American film directed by Jean Yarbrough and starring the comedy team of Abbott and Costello. It was written by Edmund L. Hartmann, John Grant, Edmund Joseph and Hal Fimberg.

The film is noteworthy for containing a filmed version of the duo's famous "Who's on First?" routine. This version is shown at the National Baseball Hall of Fame and Museum in Cooperstown, New York.

== Plot ==
The time is the 1890s. Captain Sam, owner of the showboat River Queen, travels along the Mississippi River bringing honest entertainment to each town. At a stop in Ironville, he meets Crawford, Bonita, and Bailey, who are wanted by the local sheriff. Against the advice of his daughter Caroline, his lead actor Dexter Broadhurst, and his chief roustabout Sebastian Dinwiddle, the Captain joins them for a card game at a local gambling house.

The Captain is plied with alcohol until he is intoxicated and gets involved in a crooked card game where he loses controlling interest in the show boat to Bonita and Crawford. They turn the showboat into a floating gambling casino with every game rigged in their favor. Dexter and Sebastian help the captain regain ownership of his vessel and oust the unwanted criminals.

== Cast ==
- Bud Abbott as Dexter Broadhurst
- Lou Costello as Sebastian Dinwiddle
- Alan Curtis as Crawford
- Rita Johnson as Bonita Farrow
- Henry Travers as Capt. Sam Jackson
- Lois Collier as Miss Caroline Jackson
- Joe Sawyer as Bailey
- Joe Kirk as croupier
- Lillian Yarbo as Bonita's cook (uncredited)
- Sam McDaniel as Matt, the cook-waiter (uncredited)
- John Hamilton as Sheriff of Ironville (uncredited)
- Jack Norton as drunk at Gilded Cage Café (uncredited)
- Milt Bronson as gambler (uncredited)
- Carol Hughes as Tessie (uncredited)

== Routines ==
=== Who's on First? ===
The line, "Who's on First?", was ranked No. 91 on American Film Institute's 100 Movie Quotes. The "Who's on First?" scene was intended to appear much earlier in the film. Costello begins the routine by saying, "When we get to St. Louis...", but at this point in the film they are already in St. Louis. Members of the film's crew can be heard laughing off camera during the routine.

=== Other routines ===
The film also contains the "Lower/Higher" routine, where Costello auditions as a singer while Abbott shouts directions to the stage crew to change the height and placement of the backdrop curtain. Costello believes Abbott is directing him, not the stagehands, and follows Abbott's instructions by singing higher or lower, or even on one foot.

Bonita sneaks poison into Lou's wine, leading to the old swapping of glasses routine (previously done by Abbott & Costello in Pardon My Sarong).

Costello accidentally bakes feathers into a cake, which is served to everyone in the saloon. The patrons wind up coughing up a blizzard of feathers. This gag was taken from the Three Stooges short Uncivil Warriors (1935).

Costello and Sawyer perform the "Mirror Scene," copying each other's actions. Variations of this old vaudeville routine were done by several movie comedians, most famously in the 1933 Marx Brothers film Duck Soup. Abbott and Costello had used it before, too, in Lost in a Harem.

To break up the crooked card game and rescue Captain Sam, Abbott concocts a plan to dress as a bear and scare everyone out of the casino. Costello ends up wrestling with a real bear, thinking that he's wrestling Abbott in a bear suit.

There is also a variation on the "Niagara Falls" routine. Dexter and Sebastian sneak into Bailey's room while he is asleep to search for incriminating evidence. Bailey has a sleepwalking nightmare where he imagines he is being attacked by Indians, resulting in Sebastian being repeatedly throttled.

Abbott and Costello also eat a meal that was prepared in a kitchen with stray cats roaming and meowing leading them to believe they are eating cat when the meal is ready. This also appears in Malice in the Palace (1949) from the Three Stooges.

== Production ==
Filming occurred from January 15, 1945, through March 1, 1945. On May 13, 1945, during filming of their next film, Abbott and Costello in Hollywood for MGM Pictures, Abbott and Costello returned to Universal for re-shoots on this film. The riverboat used was originally constructed for the 1936 Universal musical Show Boat.

== Reception ==
Variety wrote: "It's one of their average musicomedies containing considerable of the standard material, either straight or rewrite, with which they've been identified for years. ... The comedy is belabored and some of the situational funny stuff is much too prolonged in addition to being familiar. However the stars keep the pace fast which is what will probably satisfy."

The Monthly Film Bulletin wrote: "There is little or nothing new in the comedy sequences of this film, in which Costello, as Sebastian, works hard at playing the fool, and will no doubt amuse his fans. Direction and supporting cast are quite good."

Leslie Halliwell said: "Dim comedy apart from the team's rendition of their most famous routine, 'Who's On First'."

The Radio Times Guide to Films gave the film 2/5 stars, writing: "Bud and Lou: names that terrorise hardened movie-goers or evoke rapture at the prospect of their comic antics. While they lack the genius of Stan and Ollie it's slapstick and music hall, not sublime comedies of errors ... The highlight for many will be the six-minute 'Who's on First' dualogue, about the playing order of the St Louis baseball team. It's a routine that defies description and eschews a question mark."

== Re-release ==
It was re-released in 1950 along with One Night in the Tropics (1940), which also contained a shorter version of the "Who's on First?" routine.

== Home media ==
This film has been released three times on DVD. The first time, on The Best of Abbott and Costello Volume Two, on May 4, 2004, and again on October 28, 2008, as part of Abbott and Costello: The Complete Universal Pictures Collection. In November 2019, Abbott and Costello: The Complete Universal Pictures Collection was rereleased on DVD and Blu-ray as an 80th anniversary edition.
