= Keep 'Em Flying =

1941 comedy film directed by Arthur Lubin

- Theatrical release poster
- Directed by: Arthur Lubin
- Written by: True Boardman; Nat Perrin; John Grant
- Produced by: Glenn Tryon
- Starring: Bud Abbott; Lou Costello; Martha Raye; Carol Bruce
- Cinematography: Joseph Valentine
- Edited by: Philip Cahn
- Music by: Charles Previn
- Production company: Universal Pictures
- Distributed by: Universal Pictures
- Release date: November 28, 1941
- Running time: 86 min
- Country: United States
- Language: English
- Budget: $450,000

Keep 'Em Flying is a 1941 American comedy film directed by Arthur Lubin starring the team of Abbott and Costello alongside Martha Raye and Carol Bruce. The film was their third service comedy based on the peacetime draft of 1940. The comedy team had appeared in two previous service comedies in 1941, before the United States entered the war: Buck Privates, released in January, and In the Navy, released in May. Flying Cadets, along with Keep 'Em Flying were both produced by Universal Pictures in 1941.

The film's title is taken from the official motto of the U.S. Army Air Corps, some five months after it had been reformed into the USAAF. Keep 'Em Flying reflected the "spirit of the times" and encouraged many young men to volunteer for flight training."

== Plot ==
Jinx Roberts, an arrogant but talented stunt pilot, and his assistants Blackie and Heathcliff, are fired from a carnival air show after a disagreement with the owner. Jinx decides to join the Army Air Corps, and he, Blackie and Heathcliff go to a nightclub to party one last time. Jinx falls for the club's singer, Linda Joyce. Coincidentally, she leaves her job to become a USO hostess at the same academy where Jinx and her brother, Jimmy, are enrolled.

Jinx's instructor at the academy turns out to be Craig Morrison, his co-pilot on a commercial aircraft years earlier, and the two still hold animosity for each other. Meanwhile, Blackie and Heathcliff persuade a colonel to allow them to join the Air Corps as ground crewman. They fall in love with twin USO hostesses.

Once romance takes hold, Blackie and Heathcliff take their girls back to the same carnival they were fired from. The owner is not pleased to see Heathcliff and chases him through the fun house. Heathcliff somehow ends up telling his troubles to a gorilla.

Jinx hatches a plan to help Jimmy solo by abandoning him in mid-air. Jimmy is nearly killed landing the plane. Linda deplores Jinx for his ill-conceived actions and he, along with Blackie and Heathcliff, who have had several mishaps of their own, are discharged from the air corps. In an aerial display during graduation, Craig parachutes out of a plane but gets his chute caught on the tail end of the aircraft. Jinx, watching from the ground, confiscates an aircraft and flies to his rescue. For his heroic actions, Jinx is reinstated and wins back Linda's affections.

== Cast ==
- Bud Abbott as Blackie Benson
- Lou Costello as Heathcliff
- Martha Raye as Gloria Phelps / Barbara Phelps
- Carol Bruce as Linda Joyce
- William Gargan as Craig Morrison
- Dick Foran as Jinx Roberts
- Charles Lang as Jim Joyce
- William Davidson as Gonigle
- Truman Bradley as Butch
- Loring Smith as Maj. Barstow
- William Forrest as Colonel
- Freddie Slack as Pianist

== Production ==
Keep 'Em Flying was filmed at the Cal-Aero Academy in Ontario, California from September 5-October 29, 1941 under the working title Up in the Air. Costello's brother Pat Costello was used as Lou's stunt double. Cinematographer Elmer Dyer filmed the aerial sequences with Paul Mantz looking after the aerial "stunts".

Although Keep 'Em Flying was filmed after Ride 'Em Cowboy, the film was released first to coincide with the War Department's Keep 'Em Flying Week.

== Reception ==
Reviews from critics were generally not as positive as those for previous Abbott and Costello films. Bosley Crowther of The New York Times found (the), "routine and sticky" plot overly intrusive on the duo's antics and concluded that "As sustained entertainment ... 'Keep 'Em Flying' doesn't heed its own advice. Too often it hits the ground with a dull, resounding plop."

Variety wrote: "'Keep 'Em Flying' is the fourth release starring Abbott and Costello within a 10-month stretch. It indicates that the boys are appearing too often with their burlycue type of roustabout comedy to remain in public popularity for any length of time, unless new material is provided for their screen appearances. Too many of the numerous laugh routines displayed here are only slight variations of previous material, with resultant loss of audience reaction." However, Film Daily reported: "Easily as good as before and maybe funnier, Abbott & Costello score again in another laugh-fest that's primed for top grosses."

Harrison's Reports wrote, "Here's another Abbott and Costello picture that will set audiences roaring with laughter." John Mosher of The New Yorker called the film "a bit too usual. Many may even feel that the Costello squeal is getting feebler."

Diabolique magazine in 2019 argued it was the only one of Lubin's films with the duo that was not "first rate entertainment."

(Note: An Academy Award anomaly occurred when one of the songs from Keep 'Em Flying, "Pig Foot Pete", received a nomination for the Academy Award for Best Original Song. However, the Academy attributed the song to another Universal Pictures release, Hellzapoppin', even though it was not used in that production.)

== Re-release ==
Keep 'Em Flying was re-released by Realart Pictures with Ride 'Em Cowboy in 1949, and with Buck Privates in 1953.

== Home media ==
Keep 'Em Flying has been released twice on DVD. The first time, on The Best of Abbott and Costello Volume One, on February 10, 2004, and again on October 28, 2008, as part of Abbott and Costello: The Complete Universal Pictures Collection.
