= One Night in the Tropics =

1940 comedy film; film debut of Abbott and Costello

- Ad banner from the 1950 reissue, promoting the team as the stars
- Directed by: A. Edward Sutherland
- Written by: Gertrude Purcell; Charles Grayson
- Based on: Love Insurance; 1914 novel by Earl Derr Biggers
- Produced by: Leonard Spigelgass
- Starring: Allan Jones; Robert Cummings; Nancy Kelly; Bud Abbott; Lou Costello; William Frawley; Peggy Moran
- Cinematography: Joseph A. Valentine
- Edited by: Milton Carruth
- Music by: Jerome Kern; Dorothy Fields
- Production company: Universal Pictures
- Distributed by: Universal Pictures
- Release date: November 15, 1940
- Running time: 82 minutes
- Language: English
- Budget: over $500,000

One Night in the Tropics is a 1940 musical film notable as the film debut of Abbott and Costello. They are listed as supporting actors but have major exposure with five of their classic routines, including an abbreviated version of "Who's on First?" Their work earned them a two-picture deal with Universal, and their next film, Buck Privates, made them bona fide stars. Songs in the film were written by Jerome Kern with lyrics by Dorothy Fields.

The film is based on a 1914 novel, Love Insurance by Earl Derr Biggers, the creator of Charlie Chan. It was filmed as a silent movie in 1919 as Love Insurance by Paramount Pictures with Bryant Washburn and Lois Wilson, and in 1925 by Universal as The Reckless Age. The film's copyright was renewed in 1967. (Note: Under R423759)

== Plot ==
Steve Harper's upcoming wedding to Cynthia Merrick on the Caribbean island of San Marcos is threatened by his tenacious former girlfriend, Mickey Fitzgerald, and by Cynthia's disapproving aunt. Steve's pal, Jim "Lucky" Moore, an insurance agent, conceives an innovative "love insurance" policy that will pay Steve $1 million if his wedding to Cynthia doesn't happen. The policy is underwritten by a tough nightclub impresario, Roscoe, who warns Jim to ensure that the wedding goes off as planned. Roscoe also dispatches his henchmen, Abbott and Costello, to keep Mickey from interfering.

But Mickey dupes Abbott and Costello into taking her to San Marcos, while Cynthia grows attracted to Jim. After Mickey shows Cynthia the insurance policy, Cynthia calls off the wedding. Roscoe arrives to force the marriage at gunpoint, but Jim foils his plan and apologizes to Cynthia. Steve and Mickey, meanwhile, acknowledge their attraction and force their own wedding at gunpoint. This voids the policy and Roscoe avoids the $1 million payout.

== Cast ==
- Allan Jones as Jim "Lucky" Moore
- Nancy Kelly as Cynthia Merrick
- Bud Abbott as Abbott
- Lou Costello as Costello
- Robert Cummings as Steve Harper
- Mary Boland as Aunt Kitty Marblehead
- William Frawley as Roscoe
- Peggy Moran as Mickey Fitzgerald
- Leo Carrillo as Escobar
- Don Alvarado as Rodolfo
- Nina Orla as Nina
- Edgar Dearing as Cop with Black Eye (uncredited)
- Larry Steers as Desk Clerk (uncredited)

== Production ==
One Night in the Tropics was filmed from August 26 through September 30, 1940, under the working titles Riviera, Caribbean Nights, Caribbean Holiday, and Moonlight in the Tropics. With music by Jerome Kern and Dorothy Fields, it was originally planned for production in 1936 with a different cast but temporarily shelved due to financial troubles at Universal. The film introduced radio comedians Abbott and Costello to the public, leading to a string of popular films with the team that saved Universal from bankruptcy.

== Promotion ==
Just prior to the beginning of production, on August 21, 1940, Jones, Cummings and Virginia Bruce were guests on Abbott and Costello's radio show and promoted the film. Bruce was originally cast as Cynthia but withdrew after an automobile accident caused her to miscarry.

To promote its new comedy team, Universal staged the world premiere in Lou Costello's home town of Paterson, New Jersey at the Fabian Theatre on October 30, 1940. Universal had similarly promoted Gloria Jean by premiering her first film, The Under-Pup, in her home town of Scranton, Pennsylvania the previous year.

== Reception ==
Critics called the story portions frothy and lightweight, but saved their praise for Abbott and Costello. Film Daily: "Audiences will find One Night in the Tropics diverting enough, and it should be well received by patrons in situations generally. The opus isn't of particularly heavy gauge as musicals go, but it has enough to commend it solidly. There are humorous situations poised to tickle the film fan, and the duo invested chiefly with this duty is the Bud Abbott-Lou Costello combo so popular on the airwaves. The clowns do their baseball bit and other belly-laugh routines, and do them well." Motion Picture Herald: "What with the Abbott-Costello duo of Kate Smith's radio hour known but not seen by millions of citizens, a point for showmen to underscore in behalf of this musical comedy is that the comedians, in making their debut on the screen, forfeit none of their effectiveness but add to it, Showmen who inform their customers that these zanies stop the film in each of these interludes will be within the facts." Photoplay: "Strictly nonsense, but the antics of Abbott and Costello are so funny and the film is so lighthearted that you'll be very entertained."

The theater owners' general consensus was the same as the critical response: "Abbott and Costello save this one from flopping. Our patrons won't go for this kind of music." (Robert F. Nettle, Crandon, Wisconsin). Some exhibitors who enjoyed excellent business with Abbott and Costello's first starring film, Buck Privates, played One Night in the Tropics late (during the fall of 1941, almost a full year after its release) to cash in on the team's new popularity.

== Re-release ==
The film was re-released by Realart Pictures in 1950 on a double bill with The Naughty Nineties and in 1954 alongside Little Giant. Realart removed 13 minutes of footage to make Abbott and Costello the focal point of the film. The 69-minute reissue was promoted as a full-fledged Abbott and Costello comedy and, because the film was originally released before they were stars, few of their fans had seen it. Universal restored the missing footage in the early 1990s for all subsequent home video releases of the film.

Filmink called it "a really fun movie albeit with a silly plot."

== Home media ==
This film has been released on VHS and twice on DVD. The first DVD release was The Best of Abbott and Costello, Volume One on February 10, 2004, and again on October 28, 2008, as part of Abbott and Costello: The Complete Universal Pictures Collection.
