= Philip Cahn =

American film editor (1894–1984)

- Born: June 18, 1894; New York, New York; United States
- Died: September 28, 1984 (aged 90); Thousand Oaks, California; United States
- Occupation: Film editor
- Years active: 1930 - 1962 (film)

Philip Cahn (June 18, 1894 – September 28, 1984) was an American film editor who edited more than eighty films and television series. He also directed the 1935 film I've Been Around.

Philip Cahn, I. James Wilkinson, and Ben Lewis founded The Society of Motion Picture Film Editors in 1937, which was renamed the Motion Picture Editors Guild in 1944.

Philip Cahn was the brother of the director Edward L. Cahn and the father of the editor Dann Cahn.

== Selected filmography ==
- King for a Night (1933)
- I've Been Around (1935)
- The Great Impersonation (1935)
- The Affair of Susan (1935)
- Alias Mary Dow (1935)
- The Girl on the Front Page (1936)
- Girl Overboard (1937)
- Behind the Mike (1937)
- Rio (1939)
- The Big Guy (1939)
- Senorita from the West (1945)
- I Was an American Spy (1951)

== Bibliography ==
- Lisa Dombrowski. The Films of Samuel Fuller: If You Die, I’ll Kill You. Wesleyan University Press, 2015.
