= Holiday Lodge =

- Genre: Comedy
- Created by: Seymour Berns
- Starring: Johnny Wayne; Frank Shuster; Maureen Arthur; Charles Smith; Justice Watson
- Theme music composer: Cyril J. Mockridge
- Country of origin: United States
- Original language: English
- No. of seasons: 1
- No. of episodes: 13

Production
- Producer: Cecil Barker
- Running time: 22 minutes
- Production companies: J&M Productions

Original release
- Network: CBS
- Release: June 25 – September 17, 1961

Holiday Lodge is an American comedy television series created by Seymour Berns. The series stars Johnny Wayne, Frank Shuster, Maureen Arthur, Charles Smith and Justice Watson. The series aired on CBS from June 25, 1961, to September 17, 1961.

== Cast ==
- Johnny Wayne as Johnny Miller
- Frank Shuster as Frank Boone
- Maureen Arthur as Dorothy Jackson
- Charles Smith as Woodrow
- Justice Watson as J.W. Harrington

== Reception ==
Jack Gould of The New York Times wrote: "The program is a study in the theatrical bankruptcy that plagues much of West Coast television ... situations were rooted in wild and disastrous improbabilities that lacked even the most elementary type of humor."

In a retrospective look at the Wayne and Shuster comedy team, pop culture magazine Vulture described Holiday Lodge as both "generic" and "a total bomb", attributing the show's failure to Wayne and Shuster's lack of creative involvement. (The duo were hired strictly as performers, and did not write for the series.)

== Episodes ==
No.	Title	Directed by	Written by	Original release date
1	"The Secret Convention"	Seymour Berns	Hal Goodman & Larry Klein	June 25, 1961
2	"The Sheila Franklin Caper"	Unknown	Unknown	July 2, 1961
3	"The Kissing Bug"	Unknown	Unknown	July 9, 1961
4	"Never Hit a Stranger"	Seymour Berns	Ed Simmons	July 16, 1961
5	"Johnny's Good Deed"	Unknown	Unknown	July 23, 1961
6	"Wanted: Two Recreation Directors"	Unknown	Unknown	July 30, 1961
7	"Prince for a Day"	Unknown	Unknown	August 6, 1961
8	"Twinkle, Twinkle Little Star"	Unknown	Unknown	August 13, 1961
9	"Johnny's Other Face"	Unknown	Unknown	August 20, 1961
10	"Jewel Thieves Anonymous"	Unknown	Unknown	August 27, 1961
11	"Johnny Goes Dramatic"	Unknown	Unknown	September 3, 1961
12	"Stanley's Problem"	Unknown	Unknown	September 10, 1961
13	"Hollywood, I'll Lick You Yet"	Unknown	Unknown	September 17, 1961
