= A Shakespearean Baseball Game =

1958 comedy sketch by Wayne and Shuster

A Shakespearean Baseball Game A Comedy of Errors, Hits and Runs
- Written by: Frank Shuster; Johnny Wayne
- Characters: Team manager; Yogi/Rocky (catcher); Sam (1st base); Bill (2nd base); Richard (3rd base); Rusty (shortstop); Sandy (relief pitcher); Two umpires; Macduff; Harry, Joe and Pete (outfielders)
- Subject: Baseball
- Genre: Sketch comedy
- Setting: Bosworth Field (a baseball stadium near Stratford)

Premiere
- Date: May 22, 1958
- Place: Toronto, Ontario (CBC Television)

"A Shakespearean Baseball Game", subtitled "A Comedy of Errors, Hits and Runs", is a sketch by the Canadian comedy duo Wayne and Shuster. First performed on television in 1958 and slightly revised in 1971 and 1977, the sketch depicts a fictional baseball game with the manager, players, and umpires all speaking in Shakespearean verse. The dialogue parodies lines from the plays Hamlet, Macbeth, Julius Caesar, and Richard III while referencing modern baseball culture. It became Wayne and Shuster's signature sketch, and both its television and radio recordings have been preserved as significant works.

== History ==
"A Shakespearean Baseball Game" was created to poke fun at the hoopla surrounding the Stratford Festival, a Shakespearean festival founded in Stratford, Ontario, Canada, in 1953. Like other works by Wayne and Shuster, the sketch assumes knowledge of the classics, in this case the plays Hamlet, Macbeth, Julius Caesar, and Richard III. In preparation for the sketch, the comedians read most of Shakespeare's plays and went to the Stratford Festival, the American Shakespeare Theatre in Stratford, Connecticut, and the Royal Shakespeare Theatre in Stratford-upon-Avon, England. Wayne crafted the iambic pentameter for the sketch. Modal Elizabethan music was composed for the sketch by the comedy duo's arranger, Johnny Dobson.

The sketch was first performed on television on May 22, 1958, closing The Wayne & Shuster Hour's 1957–58 season with CBC Television. It was then performed on US television on June 1, on their third appearance on The Ed Sullivan Show, which they emceed while Sullivan was in Europe. The duo had been scheduled to perform game-show parody "The $64,000 Squeal", and had a heated argument over switching to "Shakespearean Baseball". Wayne was concerned that the new sketch wasn't yet ready for the US, while Shuster felt it was worth the risk to make a bigger impact and help attract additional job offers as their CBC contract had expired. The show was seen by an estimated 40 million viewers in the US and Canada.

The sketch was performed for CBC Radio on June 18, 1959. This recording was among the Wayne and Shuster works restored and preserved in 2000 by the Masterworks program of National Archives Canada.

The sketch was included on the duo's first comedy album, Wayne and Shuster: In Person Comedy Performance, in 1960. In 1971, the comedians slightly revised the script and re-broadcast the sketch on colour television. In 1977, the comedians produced a third version in honour of the formation of the Toronto Blue Jays.

== Description ==
Pitchers, catchers, shortstops, lend me your ears.

— "A Shakespearean Baseball Game"

The setting for the sketch is "Bosworth Field (A Baseball Stadium Near Stratford)", an allusion to the site of the final battle in Richard III. That play was the first to be staged by the Stratford Festival in its 1953 debut season. The sketch incorporates 33 quotations and puns from Shakespearean plays, along with visual slapstick. Characters speak their lines in blank verse, with the poetic metering of iambic pentameter.

The sketch runs for 10 to 11 minutes. The main roles are the team's manager and catcher, in parodies of Horatio and Hamlet, with 11 supporting roles. (Note: In addition to the two main roles, there were eleven supporting players. Writing on the Ed Sullivan performance, Barbara Moon noted "From casting they needed five girls and eleven men". With the team being all male players, this is consistent with the roles in a transcript from The Wayne and Shuster Years: 50 Years of Comedy.)

Shuster plays the manager of the fictional Stratford team, while Wayne plays the team's catcher, (Note: In the original version the catcher is named Yogi; in 1971, he was renamed "The Mighty Rocky".) a slugger who has not had a hit in ten games. The catcher mopes in the locker room and soliloquizes in the manner of Hamlet, "Oh, what a rogue and bush league slob am I, who has ten days hitless gone." With the Stratford team down 1–0 in the bottom of the ninth inning with two outs, the catcher is next at bat. Unlike "Casey at the Bat", to which it has been compared, "A Shakespearean Baseball Game" ends with the would-be hero being hit by a pitch in the head, becoming delirious, and ultimately being carried off the field. His manager vows, "No longer would Stratford see Yogi play ball, I'm trading the bum to Montreal".

In the 1977 version, the manager was named "The Mighty Thurman", the starting pitcher was called "Catfish", and the relief pitcher was dubbed "Sparky", incorporating names of baseball stars of that era.

== Reception ==
Lay on Macduff! And watch out for that breaking stuff!

— "A Shakespearean Baseball Game"

The sketch was well received on its 1958 premieres on Canadian and US television. Arthur Brydon of The Globe and Mail called it "some of the cleverest Wayne and Shuster comedy of the season", and that it was suitable for Sullivan. William Drylie of the Toronto Daily Star wrote that the sketch was "one riot followed by another" in one of their strongest shows, and agreed that it was ready for Sullivan. Following the sketch's US debut on The Ed Sullivan Show, Variety reported that the duo were "the freshest comedy team extant" and suggested that Sullivan's show be renamed after them.

There was considerable speculation that Wayne and Shuster might have permanently moved to New York, as their CBC contract had expired and their hosting Sullivan was a great success. On June 13, 1958, they signed a new contract with CBC which made them the highest-paid performers in Canadian television.

== Retrospectives ==
"A Shakespearean Baseball Game" is considered Wayne and Shuster's signature sketch. In a CBC interview, the duo noted the sketch's initial performances as the height of their career. The sketch is included in The Wayne & Shuster Years, a 75-minute retrospective of their 50+ year career, broadcast on CBC Television on February 24, 1991, and released on home video on May 28, 1996. Hosting the special, Shuster introduces the sketch as "our personal best".

The original television recording was included in Wayne and Shuster in Black and White, a retrospective series of 22 half-hour episodes, edited from the CBC archives by Shuster and broadcast on CBC Television in 1996. The Toronto Star rated that series 5 out of 5 and called the sketch a "grand takeoff" and "wonderful moments to savor".

In 2002, John McKay of The Canadian Press wrote that the sketch remains "deceptively sophisticated".

== Legacy ==
For decades, English teachers requested copies of the sketch for their classes.

In the form of a short play, the sketch has been staged theatrically at the Louisville Slugger Museum & Factory as part of the Kentucky Shakespeare Festival, the Toronto Jewish Film Festival, and at numerous other theatre festivals and events.

According to the Canadian Adaptations of Shakespeare Project at the University of Guelph, the sketch influenced later sports comedy parodies of Shakespeare by Chris Coculuzzi and Matt Toner in "Shakespeare's Rugby Wars" (2001) and "Shakespeare's World Cup" (2002).

== See also ==
- "Who's on First?" a baseball comedy sketch based on a 1930s burlesque routine, popularized by Abbott and Costello

== Footnotes ==
=== Sources ===
- Coculuzzi, Chris; Toner, Matt (2005). Shakespeare's Sports Canon. Upstart Crow Publishing. ISBN 9780973909302.
- Drouin, Jennifer (2014). Shakespeare in Quebec: Nation, Gender and Adaptation. University of Toronto Press. ISBN 9781442647978.
