= Margaret Collier Award =

Discontinued annual Canadian media award

The Margaret Collier Award is a lifetime achievement award, presented to a Canadian writer for their outstanding body of work in film or television. Formerly presented as part of the Gemini Awards, it became part of the Canadian Screen Awards in 2013. It can be presented to an individual writer or writing team. As of 2025, administration of the award has been transferred to the Writers Guild of Canada as part of its WGC Screenwriting Awards program.

The award is named in honour of Margaret Collier, the longtime executive director of ACTRA's chapter for television writers.

== Past recipients ==
=== Gemini Awards ===
- 1986 - Charles E. Israel
- 1987 - Grahame Woods
- 1988 - M. Charles Cohen
- 1989 - Donald Brittain
- 1990 - Ted Allan
- 1992 - Harry Rasky
- 1993 - George R. Robertson
- 1994 - Alex Barris
- 1995 - Timothy Findley
- 1996 - Anna Sandor
- 1998 - Douglas Bowie
- 1998 - Frank Shuster, Johnny Wayne for their collaborations as Wayne & Shuster. Frank Shuster accepted the award as Wayne had died in 1989.
- 1999 - Suzette Couture
- 2000 - Rob Forsyth
- 2001 - David Barlow
- 2002 - Patrick Watson
- 2003 - Charles Lazer
- 2004 - Wayne Grigsby
- 2005 - not presented
- 2006 - Pete White
- 2007 - Susan Marcus, Chris Clark, Lilly Barnes, Joy Simons-Newall
- 2008 - David Cole
- 2009 - Barbara Samuels
- 2010 - Donald Martin
- 2011 - Bob Carney

=== Canadian Screen Awards ===
- 2013 - Heather Conkie
- 2014 - Semi Chellas
- 2015 - Tassie Cameron
- 2016 - Karen Walton
- 2017 - Denis McGrath
- 2018 - Brad Wright
- 2019 - David Shore

=== WGC Screenwriting Awards ===
- 2025 - Andrew Wreggitt
- 2026 - Ian Weir

== See also ==
- Canadian television awards
