= Rinse the Blood Off My Toga =

Comedy sketch by Wayne and Shuster

- Written by: Frank Shuster; Johnny Wayne
- Characters: Flavius Maximus; Brutus; Calpurnia; Cassius; Mark Antony; Tiberius; Claudius; Regulus Bibendus
- Subject: Assassination of Julius Caesar
- Genre: Sketch comedy
- Setting: Roman Senate

Premiere
- Date: 1954
- Place: McGill Street Studios; Toronto, Ontario; (CBC Radio)

"Rinse the Blood Off My Toga" is a comedy sketch by the Canadian comedy duo Wayne and Shuster. First broadcast on The Wayne and Shuster Hour on CBC Radio in 1954, it was reenacted for their British television debut in 1957 and their first appearance on The Ed Sullivan Show in 1958. The sketch recasts the Shakespearean historical tragedy as a detective story with gangster overtones. Set in the Roman Senate right after the assassination of Julius Caesar, the script has Brutus (Shuster) engaging the services of private eye Flavius Maximus (Wayne) to identify Caesar's assassin. Several lines from the sketch became popular catchphrases, including Flavius's order of a "martinus" (a single martini) in a Roman bar, and the repeated lament of Caesar's widow Calpurnia in a thick Bronx accent, "I told him, 'Julie, don't go!'" It is considered Wayne and Shuster's most famous sketch.

== History ==
The original 13-minute sketch of "Rinse the Blood Off My Toga" was broadcast on CBC radio in 1954. Written by Frank Shuster and Johnny Wayne, the sketch was produced by Drew Crossan. Shuster stars as Brutus and Wayne plays "private Roman eye" Flavius Maximus, whom Brutus hires to identify Caesar's assassin. Supporting players included Don Ewer, Jacob Reinglass, Ed McNamara, Johnny Shapiro, Peggi Loder, and Sylvia Lennick as Caesar's widow Calpurnia.

The sketch was first televised on CBC on February 11, 1955, and reworked for another CBC television broadcast in January 1958. A 20-minute version of the sketch was performed for the duo's British television debut on October 2, 1957, on Granada's Chelsea at Nine.

On May 4, 1958, Wayne and Shuster performed the sketch in their first appearance on The Ed Sullivan Show. The original script was shortened slightly for this televised performance.

== Description ==
Bartender: What're you drinking?
Flavius: Gimme a martinus.
Bartender: You mean a martini.
Flavius: If I wanted two I'd ask for them.

— "Rinse the Blood Off My Toga"

The sketch recasts Shakespeare's historical tragedy Julius Caesar as "a hard-boiled detective story". Fresh after Caesar's assassination, Brutus (Shuster) engages the services of "private Roman eye" Flavius Maximus (Wayne) to identify the killer, and Flavius goes around interrogating suspects. The sketch also parodies gangster narratives: "The play's characters are treated as if they had Mob connections as Flavius looks for Mr. Big". Caesar himself is referred to as "Big Julie". Flavius delivers his lines with the clipped pronunciation of Joe Friday from Dragnet. Eventually Flavius identifies Brutus as the perpetrator. Meanwhile, Caesar's widow Calpurnia walks around lamenting over her dead husband in a thick Bronx accent, "I told him, 'Julie, don't go!'"—referring to Caesar's decision to go to the Roman Senate that day.

In addition to the roles of Flavius, Brutus, and Calpurnia, there are eight supporting male roles. Like other sketches by the comedy duo, the script requires audience familiarity with history, the classics, and even Latin for an appreciation of its humour.

The skit traditionally begins with the statement "This play is presented with apologies to William Shakespeare - and Sir Francis Bacon, just in case," a reference to the longstanding Baconian theory of Shakespeare authorship.

== Reception ==
Flavius: He's dead. He was stabbed through the portico.
Brutus: That's even more painful than the rotunda.

— "Rinse the Blood Off My Toga"

Wayne and Shuster's 1957 British television performance of the sketch received praise from British TV producers and invitations to return. Though the newspapers did not review the sketch, a Canadian-born critic for The Evening Standard sent a note to their hotel, stating, "Well done. Canada is proud of you."

Wayne and Shuster's performance of the sketch in their debut on The Ed Sullivan Show was an immediate success. Jack Gould of The New York Times declared Wayne and Shuster to be "the harbingers of literate slapstick on TV". The show's ratings—which had dropped from No. 1 to the low 20s—soared that night, and Sullivan called the duo "the biggest hit on my show in the ten years we've been on the air".

Several lines from the script became popular catchphrases. Flavius's order of a "martinus" (a single martini) in a Roman bar prompted some New York bars to begin offering a "Martinus Special". A Toronto bar introduced a drink called "Big Julie", after the sketch's moniker for Julius Caesar.

The line that received the biggest laugh was the lament of Caesar's widow Calpurnia, played by Toronto actress Sylvia Lennick. She wailed over and over in a thick Bronx accent: "I told him, 'Julie, don't go!'" It became one of the most memorable lines of 1950s North American television. The enthusiastic response to that line both in rehearsals and during the live broadcast surprised Lennick, who had been hesitant to put on the accent in front of a New York City audience. In a 2008 interview with the Toronto Star to mark the 50th anniversary of the Sullivan performance, Lennick stated that when she first read the script, she hadn't thought that "I told him, 'Julie, don't go!'" would be the sketch's biggest laugh line: "I thought I was going to kill them when I said, 'It's the Ides of March, already'".

== Further success on Sullivan ==
Sullivan had signed Wayne and Shuster to appear 26 times in the 1958–59 season, but due to the positive feedback to "Rinse the Blood Off My Toga", he invited them to return the following week, on May 11, to perform their sketch "The Brown Pumpernickel" (a spoof of The Scarlet Pimpernel). Lennick was also called back to repeat her catchphrase in her Roman costume, receiving a warm reception. Two weeks later, Sullivan brought Wayne and Shuster back again to host the show in his absence. In a bit written by the duo, Lennick again delivered her catchphrase. This time, she sat in the audience, playing a woman whose husband, one Julius Melnik, had been waiting ten years to be introduced on camera, and now that the camera was focused on his seat, he had stepped out. Lennick appropriately wailed: "I told him, 'Julie, don't go!'" Wayne and Shuster went on to appear on Sullivan a total of 67 times.

== Retrospectives and preservation ==
A radio recording of the sketch from June 18, 1959, was chosen for special preservation in 2000 and restored as part of the Masterworks program of National Archives Canada. It was subsequently released on Wayne and Shuster: The Radio Years. It is often played on CBC Radio on March 15. (Note: March 15 is the Ides of March, the day of the assassination of Julius Caesar.)

A version appears, along with others of their most popular skits of the time, on their 1960 record, In Person Comedy Performance.

In the 1980s, a colour version of "Rinse the Blood Off My Toga" and other material from Wayne and Shuster's CBC programs was included in 80 half-hour episodes which were syndicated internationally to two dozen countries.

A colour version of the sketch is included in The Wayne & Shuster Years, a 75-minute retrospective of their 50+ year career, broadcast on CBC Television on February 24, 1991, and released on home video on May 28, 1996.

The sketch was also included in Wayne and Shuster in Black and White, a retrospective series of 22 half-hour episodes, edited from the CBC archives and broadcast on CBC Television in 1996. While assembling this material, Shuster felt that the 1958 performance was "much superior" but found that two important lines—including Lennick's "Julie, don't go!"—had been cut out with scissors. He carefully guided the editing of material from the 1954 version into the gaps of the 1958 version, with an explanation of this decision in his introductory narration.

== Legacy ==
Wayne and Shuster agreed that "Rinse the Blood Off My Toga" was their most celebrated sketch. A performance photograph of the sketch is included on the Comedy Wall of Fame in the Canadian Broadcasting Centre.

The working script for "Rinse the Blood Off My Toga", along with other donated Canadian entertainment memorabilia, was sealed in a time capsule placed under the cornerstone for Toronto's Performing Arts Lodge (PAL) in a ceremony on May 5, 1992. Located on The Esplanade, the lodge is a residence for retired and young performing artists.

The sketch has been screened and staged theatrically at benefits. The sketch was screened at the Royal Ontario Museum in 2016, as part of a Toronto Jewish Film Festival event which posthumously honoured the duo and their work.
