= Rosie Shuster =

Canadian comedy writer and actress (born 1946)

- Born: June 19, 1946 (age 80); Toronto, Ontario, Canada
- Occupation: Writer
- Spouse: Lorne Michaels (m. 1967; div. 1980)
- Parent(s): Frank Shuster (father), Ruth Burstyn (mother)

Rosie Shuster (born June 19, 1946) is a Canadian comedy writer and actress. She was a writer for Saturday Night Live during the 1970s and 1980s.

== Early and personal life ==
Rosie Shuster was born in Toronto, Ontario, Canada to Ruth (née Burstyn), an interior designer, and Frank Shuster, of the Wayne and Shuster comedy duo. She was named after the character Rosalind from William Shakespeare's play As You Like It. Like her father, she is a cousin of Superman co-creator Joe Shuster. She grew up in the neighbourhood of Forest Hill on Ridelle Avenue and attended school at West Prep and Forest Hill Collegiate. She studied English at the University of Toronto, married her first husband Lorne Michaels at Holy Blossom Temple and is of Jewish descent.

Shuster was married to Saturday Night Live's creator, Lorne Michaels, from 1967 to 1980. The pair first met in junior high school, when Michaels, born Lorne Lipowitz, followed her home, hoping to meet her famous father. Together, Shuster and Michaels wrote and performed comedy sketches through high school, summer camp, and college. They began their TV career on The Hart and Lorne Terrific Hour show for Canadian TV on the Canadian Broadcasting Corporation (CBC). Appearing on the show were Dan Aykroyd and Gilda Radner, among others. Shuster and Michaels moved to Los Angeles to work on The Lily Tomlin Show for ABC, where they also met Laraine Newman, whom they invited, along with Aykroyd and Radner, to join the Not Ready for Prime Time Players for Saturday Night Live.

== Career ==
=== Writing for Saturday Night Live ===
Of the beginnings of SNL, Shuster has said, "There was a long incubation period where everybody was kind of falling in love with each other and cracking each other up, trying to find their place, have a voice. We were stockpiling a lot of commercial parodies. You could feel something organically happening amongst us."

Shuster's comedy legacy at SNL includes some of the show's most memorable characters and sketches from its early days, such as the beloved Killer Bees, and the Todd and Lisa sketch, played by Bill Murray and Gilda Radner. Radner's character of Roseanne Roseannadanna first appeared in a sketch by Shuster. Teaming up with Radner and writer Anne Beatts, she wrote the first sketches featuring Emily Litella, Radner's confused yet outspoken elderly woman, and Baba Wawa, her spoof of Barbara Walters.

On the social impact of SNL, Shuster noted, "You have to remember in the mid-seventies, there was Watergate and Vietnam. Rock music had broken out in the sixties as well as a lot of films like the Jack Nicholson kind of movies, Five Easy Pieces. They reflected the revolution in consciousness that came out of the sixties but television was still square as hell. So part of the impetus of the whole show was to just shake things up and to reflect back what was happening in the culture, the edginess and spontaneity that wasn't happening on television."

During the eighties, Shuster helped Dana Carvey develop his recurring character the Church Lady, the uptight, smug, and pious host of Church Chat. She also wrote a Tyrone sketch for Eddie Murphy which he performed when he was honored with the Mark Twain Award at the Kennedy Center.

=== Later work ===
Shuster's other writing work includes the Broadway show Gilda Live at the Winter Garden Theatre, written with Michael O'Donoghue, Marilyn Miller, Alan Zweibel, and Anne Beatts, and directed by Mike Nichols, who later turned the show into a film in 1980.

During the early nineties, Shuster was a writer and producer for Carol and Company and The Larry Sanders Show with Garry Shandling.

Shuster produced the three-volume Wayne and Shuster Legacy Series for the CBC, which first aired in 2008. She has also written a number of film scripts for MGM, Tristar, Warner Brothers, and Orion.

In 2016, Shuster appeared in the documentary Behind the Scenes at Saturday Night Live: An Evening With Laraine Newman, Carol Leifer and Rosie Shuster.

Along with other SNL alumni, Shuster is interviewed in the 2018 documentary on the life of Gilda Radner titled Love, Gilda.

Shuster is featured in the 2024 film Saturday Night, which chronicles the night of premier of the very first Saturday Night Live episode, portrayed by Rachel Sennott.

=== Film ===
In 1980, Shuster appeared as a cocktail waitress in The Blues Brothers.

== Awards and honors ==
Shuster has received two Emmys and four Emmy nominations for her writing on SNL and The Larry Sanders Show. She was nominated for an Emmy and a CableACE award for one of her scripts for The Larry Sanders Show. She has been inducted into the Museum of Broadcasting.
