= Who's on First? =

Comedy routine made famous by Abbott and Costello

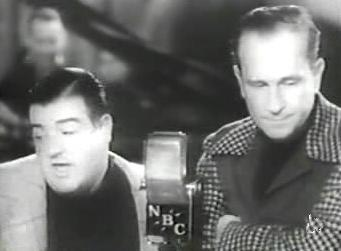
Abbott and Costello performing "Who's on First?"

"Who's on First?" is a comedy routine made famous by American comedy duo Abbott and Costello. The premise of the sketch is that Abbott is identifying the players on a baseball team for Costello. However, the players' names can simultaneously serve as the basis for questions (e.g., "Who is the first baseman?") and responses (e.g., "The first baseman's name is Who."), leading to reciprocal misunderstanding and growing frustration between the performers. Although it is commonly known as "Who's on First?", Abbott and Costello frequently referred to it simply as "Baseball".

In 1956, a gold record of "Who's on First?" was placed in the National Baseball Hall of Fame and Museum in Cooperstown, New York. A video (taken from the team's 1945 film The Naughty Nineties) plays continuously at the Hall.

In 1999, Time named the routine Best Comedy Sketch of the 20th Century.

An early radio recording from October 6, 1938, was placed in the Library of Congress's National Recording Registry in 2002.

== History ==
"Who's on First?" is descended from minstrel and turn-of-the-century wordplay sketches. One of the most famous was developed by Weber and Fields and called "I Work On Watt Street". Other examples include "The Baker Scene" (the comedian "loafs" at a bakery located on Watt Street) and "Who Dyed" (the business owner is named "Who"). In the 1930 movie Cracked Nuts, comedians Bert Wheeler and Robert Woolsey examine a map of a mythical kingdom with dialogue like this: "What is next to Which." "What is the name of the town next to Which?" "Yes." In British music halls, comedian Will Hay performed a routine in the early 1930s (and possibly earlier) as a schoolmaster interviewing a schoolboy named Howe, who came from Ware, but now lives in Wye. By the early 1930s, a "Baseball Routine" had become a standard "bit" in burlesque in the United States. Abbott's wife recalled him performing the routine with another comedian before teaming with Costello.

Bud Abbott stated that it was taken from an older routine called "Who's the Boss?", a performance of which can be heard in an episode of the radio comedy program It Pays to Be Ignorant from the 1940s. After they formally teamed up in burlesque in 1936, he and Costello continued to hone the sketch. It was a big hit in the fall of 1937, when they performed the routine in a touring vaudeville revue called Hollywood Bandwagon.

In February 1938, Abbott and Costello joined the cast of The Kate Smith Hour radio program and the sketch was first performed for a national radio audience on March 24 of that year. The routine may have been further polished before this broadcast by burlesque producer John Grant, who became the team's chief collaborator, and Will Glickman, a staff writer on the Smith show. Glickman may have added the nicknames of then-contemporary baseball players like Dizzy and Daffy Dean to set up the routine's premise. This version, with extensive wordplay based on most of the fictional baseball team's players having "strange nicknames" that seemed to be questions, became known as "Who's on First?" Some versions continue with references to Enos Slaughter, which Costello misunderstands as "He knows" Slaughter. Another reference was to Bob Feller, where Abbott asks, "Feller pitching?" and Costello responds, "Of course there's a feller pitching!" By 1944, Abbott and Costello had the routine copyrighted.

Abbott and Costello performed "Who's on First?" hundreds of times in their careers. Although it was rarely performed precisely the same way twice, the routine follows a definite structure. They did the routine for President Franklin Roosevelt several times. An abridged version was featured in the team's 1940 film debut, One Night in the Tropics. The duo reprised the bit in their 1945 film The Naughty Nineties and it is that longer version which is considered their finest recorded rendition. (Note: Director Jean Yarbrough did two takes, possibly because the first was marred by laughter from the film crew. Yet even on the take that is used in the film, it is possible to hear muffled laughs in the background.) They also performed "Who's on First?" several times on radio and television (notably in The Abbott and Costello Show episode "The Actor's Home").

In 1956, a gold record of "Who's on First?" was placed in the National Baseball Hall of Fame and Museum in Cooperstown, New York. A video (taken from The Naughty Nineties) now plays continuously on screens at the Hall.

In the 1970s, Selchow and Righter published a "Who's on First?" board game.

In 1999, Time named the routine Best Comedy Sketch of the 20th Century.

An early radio recording from October 6, 1938, was placed in the Library of Congress's National Recording Registry in 2002.

In 2005, the line "Who's on First?" was included on the American Film Institute's list of 100 memorable movie quotations.

== Sketch ==
The names given in the routine for the players at each position are:

Position	Player
First base	Who
Second base	What
Third base	I Don't Know
Left field	Why
Center field	Because
Right field	—N/a
Pitcher	Tomorrow
Catcher	Today
Shortstop	I Don't Give a Darn

The name of the shortstop is not given until the very end of the routine and the right fielder is never named. In the Selchow and Righter board game, the right fielder's name is "Nobody".

At one point in the routine, Costello thinks that the first baseman is named "Naturally":

Abbott: You throw the ball to first base.
Costello: Then who gets it?
Abbott: Naturally.
Costello: Naturally.
Abbott: Now you've got it.
Costello: I throw the ball to Naturally.
Abbott: You don't! You throw it to Who!
Costello: Naturally.
Abbott: Well, that's it—say it that way.
Costello: That's what I said.
Abbott: You did not.
Costello: I said I throw the ball to Naturally.
Abbott: You don't! You throw it to Who!
Costello: Naturally.

Abbott's explanations leave Costello hopelessly confused and infuriated. At two points in the routine Costello appears to parody Abbott by saying what appears to be gibberish to him, but inadvertently gets it right:

Costello: Now Tomorrow throws the ball and the guy up bunts the ball. Now when he bunts the ball, me being a good catcher, I want to throw the guy out at first base, so I pick up the ball and throw it to who?
Abbott: Now that's the first thing you've said right!
Costello: I don't even know what I'm talking about!

And finally,

Costello: Now I throw the ball to first base, whoever it is drops the ball, so the guy runs to second. Who picks up the ball and throws it to What. What throws it to I Don't Know. I Don't Know throws it back to Tomorrow—a triple play.
Abbott: Yeah, it could be.
Costello: Another guy gets up and it's a long fly ball to Because. Why? I don't know. He's on third and I don't give a darn!
Abbott: What was that?
Costello: I said, I don't give a darn!
Abbott: Oh, that's our shortstop!

That is the most commonly heard ending. "I Don't Care" and "I Don't Give a Damn" have also turned up on occasion, depending on the perceived sensibilities of the audience. The performance in the film The Naughty Nineties ends with "I Don't Care".

The skit was performed only twice on the team's radio series, being heard more often when they guested on other shows. On their April 17, 1947 show, it serves as a climax for a broadcast which begins with Costello receiving a telegram from Joe DiMaggio asking Costello to take over for him due to his injury. Since DiMaggio played center field at the time, Costello ostensibly would be the center fielder, moving Because to right field.

== Writing credit ==
"Who's On First?" evolved from earlier wordplay sketches but it is not known who transposed the basic wordplay to baseball, although numerous people have claimed or been given credit for it. Such claims typically lack reasonable corroboration. For example, a 1993 obituary of comedy sketch writer Michael J. Musto (1919–1993) claims that, shortly after Abbott and Costello teamed up, they paid Musto $15 to write the script. Obituaries of songwriter Irving Gordon (1915–1996) claim that he had written the sketch. Musto would have been 17 when Abbott and Costello teamed in 1936, but a script entitled "The Baseball Rookie", with the names of Costello and Joe Lyons, his straight man before Abbott, dates even earlier, perhaps to 1934, when Musto would have been 15 and Gordon would have been 19.

== Copyright infringement case ==
In 2015, the heirs of Abbott and Costello filed a federal copyright infringement lawsuit in the Southern District of New York claiming unauthorized use of over a minute of the comedy routine in the play Hand to God. The suit named producer Kevin McCollum, playwright Robert Askins, and the promoters as defendants. The defense claimed that the underlying "Who's on First?" routine was in the public domain because the original authors, Abbott and Costello, were not the ones who filed a copyright renewal, but the court did not see the need to make a final determination on that. The court ruled against the heirs, saying that the use by the play was transformative.

On appeal, the Second Circuit affirmed the district court in 2016 but for the other reason. The one minute of the routine used in the play did not constitute transformative fair use, since it was a significant portion and was taken word for word. But that was moot since the court also found that the heirs had failed to establish that they owned the copyright. (The court did not reach the issue of whether the routine had entered the public domain since the parties had apparently stipulated that they believed its copyright term was coterminous with One Night in the Tropics, where it had first been published for purposes of copyright law at that time). The U.S. Supreme Court denied certiorari on the case in 2017.

== Derivatives and references in popular culture ==
The sketch has been reprised, updated, alluded to and parodied many times over the decades in all forms of media. Some examples include:

- The comedy troupe The Credibility Gap (1968–1979) did a rock group variation on this routine involving a promoter, played by Harry Shearer, and a newspaper advertising salesman, played by David L. Lander, confusing the night's acts as proper nouns. The acts were The Who, The Guess Who and Yes.
- Eugene Levy and Tony Rosato performed a variation on this theme on the "Midnight Express Special" episode (season 3, episode 19) of SCTV (Second City Television), which originally aired on January 23, 1981, involving the rock groups The Band, The Who and Yes. The final punchline changed to "This is for the birds (The Byrds)!" "Ah, they broke up long ago!"
- Episode six of the fourth season of WKRP in Cincinnati (1981) is entitled "Who's on First?". It revolves around Mr. Carlson being mistaken for a hospitalized Herb Tarlek, and to "prove Andy wrong" Les Nessman is then convinced to act as Mr. Carlson. When a thug named Dave shows up to confront Johnny Fever about an unpaid gambling debt, Johnny claims Andy Travis's identity, while Mr. Carlson refers to Andy as "Johnny" ... with painful consequences for Andy.
- The biography of Lou Costello written by his daughter Chris is titled Lou's on First (1982).
- In the mid-1980s, Johnny Carson's spoof of then-president Ronald Reagan preparing for a press briefing included "Hu is on the phone", a reference to fictional Chinese leader Chung Dong Hu (there would eventually be a real Chinese leader Hu Jintao). Reagan also misunderstands references to Secretary of the Interior James Watt (misheard as "what") and PLO leader Yassir Arafat (misheard as "Yes sir"). The "Hu" interpretation was also done in the Family Guy episode "Extra Large Medium", in which Peter Griffin, in his medium routine, claims to "possess" the spirit of Costello inside him, and quickly falls into the routine with police officer Joe Swanson when it is revealed the victim in question is named Melvin Hu. They take too long to recover his body in time to deactivate the bomb strapped to him, and upon it exploding Peter immediately concludes the routine admitting he was not actually psychic.
- In the 1986 Billy Crystal HBO special Don't Get Me Started, Brother Theodore and Sammy Davis Jr. practice an ill-fated version of the routine in their own incongruous performance styles.
- In the 1988 film Rain Man, the film's titular character, played by Dustin Hoffman, stims by reciting the skit to himself whenever his brother Charlie, played by Tom Cruise, makes him anxious by meddling with his personal effects.
- In the Garfield and Friends episode "Who Done It?" (1992), Orson hires a group of identical triplet dogs named "Who", "What", & "Where" to work on the farm, which causes major confusion for Roy and Wade when trying to figure out their names. The routine was featured again in the later episode "Canned Laughter" (1994) where Garfield distracts Jon's comedy robot by asking it to explain the routine to him.
- In the Animaniacs segment "Woodstock Slappy" (1994), Slappy and Skippy Squirrel attend the 1969 Woodstock Festival, where they pay homage to the routine. Similar to the SCTV version, Slappy confuses The Who, The Band and Yes for proper nouns.
- In The Kids in the Hall sketch "McGuillicutty and Green", there is a parody of the skit where the straight man Green constantly spoils the joke by explaining it to McGuillicutty: "Oh I see what your problem is! You're confused by their names because they all sound like questions."
- In the Invasion of the Neptune Men episode of Mystery Science Theater 3000 in 1998, during one host segment, Mike and the 'Bots put on a Who's on First–themed skit concerning Japanese Noh theater.
- In The Simpsons episode "Marge Simpson in: 'Screaming Yellow Honkers'" (1999), Superintendent Chalmers and Principal Skinner attempt to perform the routine, but Chalmers gives up after Skinner explains the joke with his first line: "Not the pronoun, but rather a player with the unlikely name of 'Who' is on first."
- In the Get Fuzzy comic for September 12, 2005, an injured Rob asks Satchel to use speed dial to call "Dr. Watt", who is second on the speed dial list after Dr. Hu. Satchel gleefully replies "Third Base!", much to Rob's annoyance.
- In the 2007 film Rush Hour 3, LAPD Detective James Carter (Chris Tucker) visits a kung fu studio where he meets Master Yu and an instructor named Mi. Carter, Yu and Mi engage in a comedic back and forth in which they confuse the names Yu and Mi with the words "you" and "me".
- In 2007, Canadian Internet comedy group LoadingReadyRun released a parody called It's Very Simple.
- In How I Met Your Mother episode Hopeless (2011) from season 6, while deciding where to go out for the night, the gang begins to recall the names of New York City nightclubs that are common words and spoken phrases ("Was", "Wrong", "Oh No", "Where", "Okay", "Lame", "Focus", "Closed", "Shut Up") and they end up talking in a confusing circle until Barney's dad, Jerry, exclaims "I don't know, third base, right?" and Robin responds "Ew, Third Base is all frat guys." As Third Base is yet another name of a club.
- Late Night with Jimmy Fallon, in December 2012, featured a variation of the routine called "Who's on First?: The Sequel". Depicted with vintage touches (black and white images, retro costumes, etc.), the skit finds host Jimmy Fallon in the Bud Abbott role and announcer Steve Higgins as Lou Costello. The twist here is that "Who", "What" and "I Don't Know" actually join in on the quick repartee, with the players respectively played by Billy Crystal, Late Night head writer A. D. Miles and Jerry Seinfeld.
- In Bojack Horseman episode "Downer Ending", (2014) a group of characters encounter a doctor named Allan Hu, which Bojack at first confuses with BBC television show Doctor Who; which Bojack's roommate Todd Sanchez further confuses for Doctor Quinn, Medicine Woman. In utter confusion, Todd at one point says "I don't know", to which all the characters simultaneously exclaim "Third base!".
- The October 19, 2014, strip of the comic Pearls Before Swine sees Rat ask Goat "Whose drummer was Keith Moon?" Goat responds that he is correct, although Rat does not understand that Goat is telling him Moon was the drummer for The Who. It leads to a routine of more confusions, including Charlie Watts of The Rolling Stones, Bob Weir of the Grateful Dead, Steve Howe of Yes and Pete Townshend – also of The Who. Thinking Goat is asking what band Townshend is the guitarist for, an exasperated Rat screams "I don't know!" Goat replies "Third base!" The final panel sees the still-exasperated Rat threatening to hit the comic's author Stephan Pastis with a baseball bat, asking "When would you like this hit?". Pastis responds "Winwood's the guitarist for Traffic."
- The 2015 puzzle video game Keep Talking and Nobody Explodes features a module officially referred to on page 9 of the Bomb Defusal Manual V1 as Who's on First. Its description reads: "This contraption is like something out of a sketch comedy routine, which might be funny if it wasn't connected to a bomb. I'll keep this brief, as words only complicate matters". The module works similarly to the routine, in which the Defuser must recite the word that appears on the module's display to the Expert. The Expert must then follow the steps in the manual to tell the Defuser which button to press. The reference comes in the form of the words that appear on the module's buttons, some of them being homophones of other words that may appear, an example being the words there, they're and their, thus resulting in a similar confusion to that of the sketch.
- In 2017, Studio C made a spin-off of this as a sketch in their seventh season, titled Detective Doctor, At Your Service, where several characters have names such as Detective Doctor, Doctor Hisbrother and Officer Wounded, making the scene of an attempted murder much more confusing to deal with.
- Emcee duo Blanche Debris and Jonny Porkpie did an adaptation of the sketch at the 2017 Burlesque Hall of Fame weekender and reunion, recontextualized as the lineup for a burlesque show.
- A variant of unknown origin, called "Abbot and Costello do Hebrew", is popular in the Jewish American community. Its humor draws from the homophonic similarity of a number of words in English – hu, he, me, ma and dag are homophones of the Hebrew words for he, she, who, what and fish respectively.
- The skit is an easter egg on Google Assistant, Siri, Amazon Alexa and Bixby. Asking Google Assistant "OK Google, Who's on first?" will lead to the response "Yes, he is." or "Exactly." Siri responds "Correct. Who is on first." Alexa responds "That's what I keep telling you. Who's on first, What's on second." Bixby responds "I think Who gets the ball and throws it to What."
- There are several American restaurants named "Who's on First", located on 1st Street or 1st Avenue of their respective cities, including New York City, Waconia, MN and Snohomish, WA
- In the spring split of 2022, League Championship Series casters Azael and Captain Flowers performed a spin-off of the skit using "River" and "Blue", the tags of two players from the esports team Dignitas as well as the river location and blue jungle camp on Summoner's Rift.
- In the 2026 documentary You Can See Everything, comedian and filmmaker Nathan Fielder shows a video of the routine to Theranos founder and convicted felon Elizabeth Holmes as a way to explain that a recent conversation of theirs, in which Holmes attempted to deny that she had committed fraud, felt similarly absurd and frustrating to him, as it hinged on Holmes' misleading use of the word "can," reminiscent of the two meanings of "Who" in the sketch. Although she politely watches the sketch and initially acts as if she gets the joke, when asked directly by Fielder to say the name of the player on first base, Holmes states, with no apparent understanding of the basic premise of the sketch or the unintentionally humorous nature of her response, "I don't know."

== Real-life parallels ==
On several occasions, players with names phonetically similar to the characters in the sketch reached the appropriate bases as runners, or defended them as infielders:

- On October 3, 1920, Allie Watt played one game at second base for the Washington Senators so that, for a brief time, "Watt's on second".
- During a May 31, 1966, game against the Minnesota Twins, relief-pitcher Eddie Watt of the Baltimore Orioles led off the 5th inning with his only career double, again creating a "Watt's on second" situation.
- In September 2007, Los Angeles Dodgers shortstop Chin-Lung Hu, a late-season callup from Las Vegas, got his first major league hit against the Arizona Diamondbacks, a single; Dodgers announcer Vin Scully said "Shades of Abbott and Costello, I can finally say, 'Hu is on first base.'"

== See also ==
- Curse of knowledge
- Four Candles, a sketch from the British sketch comedy program The Two Ronnies, first performed in 1976, with a similar premise involving misinterpreted phrases.
- Propositional attitude
- "A Shakespearean Baseball Game", a Wayne and Shuster sketch first performed in 1958
