= The Trouble with Tracy =

Canadian television sitcom

- Genre: Sitcom
- Written by: Goodman Ace
- Directed by: Paul Kimberley; Seymour Berns; Vlad Handera
- Starring: Diane Nyland; Steve Weston; Franz Russell; Sylvia Lennick
- Composers: Al Kasha; Joel Hirschhorn
- Country of origin: Canada
- Original language: English
- No. of seasons: 1
- No. of episodes: 130

Production
- Executive producer: Murray Chercover
- Producer: Seymour Berns
- Production location: CFTO-TV Toronto Studios
- Running time: 30 minutes
- Production companies: CTV; National General Television

Original release
- Network: CTV
- Release: 1970 – 1971

The Trouble with Tracy is a Canadian sitcom produced by CTV for the 1970–1971 television season, with intended distribution by the U.S.-based National General Pictures. The series was based on scripts from the American radio comedy Easy Aces (1930–1945), written by Goodman Ace. It has been cited as one of the worst sitcoms ever produced.

The series was produced as a daily program and aired on weekday afternoons at 3:30 p.m., beginning September 14, 1970. It was not listed in the newspaper's television listings the previous week.

A total of 130 episodes were produced, with seven episodes filmed every five days. The series became known for its low production values. Because of the limited budget and production schedule, errors such as flubbed lines and bloopers sometimes appeared in the final broadcasts. The show used a laugh track rather than a live studio audience.

== Production ==
The Trouble with Tracy was filmed in Toronto at the studios of CFTO-TV. Although produced in Canada, the series was set in New York City and centered on a newlywed couple, Tracy Sherwood Young (Diane Nyland) and Doug Young (Steve Weston).

Tracy was portrayed as cheerful, literal-minded, and prone to malapropisms, while Doug was an advertising executive frequently exasperated by her well-intentioned but disruptive attempts to help. Episodes typically took place in the Youngs' apartment or at Doug's workplace, and were often narrated by Doug. Storylines usually revolved around complications caused by Tracy's behaviour at home, at work, or in social situations, with the couple reconciling by the end of each episode.

Other regular characters included:

- Paul Sherwood (Franz Russell), Tracy's hippie brother, who was known for money-making schemes, often involving Tracy, and for frequently borrowing from Doug.
- Mrs. Sherwood (Sylvia Lennick), Tracy's critical mother.
- Tony Marshall (Arch McDonnell), the Youngs' friendly neighbour and a writer.
- Mr. Jonathan Norris (Ben Lennick), Doug's demanding boss.
- Sally Anderson (Bonnie Brooks), Tracy's cousin and Doug's secretary.

The show's pilot was initially titled The Married Youngs, a play on The Young Marrieds and the married couple's surname. The pilot was directed by Seymour Berns, one of the show's producers. Berns was an Emmy Award-nominated director and producer whose previous credits included The Red Skelton Show and The Jack Benny Program, and had a long association with CBS before moving to National General Pictures in the late 1960s to develop projects for them. . Berns changed the title to The Trouble with Tracy, naming it after his daughter Tracy.

The 1969 pilot was produced by CFTO and financed by CBS, with the aim of selling the series to CBS affiliates or into broadcast syndication. The producers were initially unsuccessful in selling the series in the United States. In June 1971, the series was sold to WOR-TV in New York City for a trial run. The series also aired on WOR-TV in New York City for the 1971-1972 television season, with contemporary television listings show it in a 6:00 p.m. weekday slot. WOR aired the initial 130 episodes nightly but declined to renew the series, and National General Pictures was unable to sell it to other American stations.

The show aired Monday to Friday during its original run on CTV. Episodes were later rerun by CTV in the 1972–73 season at 9:30 a.m. and were also seen in daytime repeats on CITY-TV Toronto in the 1981–82 season.

== Context ==
The Trouble with Tracy is often considered to have been produced primarily to satisfy Canadian content requirements. Cultural critics, including Geoff Pevere, have noted that despite its reputation and lack of success, the series also represented one of the early attempts to produce a scripted television program within the financial limitations of Canadian television production at the time.

At the time of the series' production, American television networks had the financial resources and broader programming portfolios to absorb losses by cancelling underperforming shows early. CTV, which had limited national reach compared with CBC Television, was under greater pressure to recover its investment by airing the full series. The network had only recently emerged from a period of financial instability and operated as a cooperative of its affiliated stations. Under that structure, network programming was closely tied to its member stations, a model more comparable to PBS in the United States or ITV in the United Kingdom than to the centralized structure of later Canadian commercial television networks.

== Ongoing influence in Canadian popular culture ==
In their book TV North: Everything You Ever Wanted to Know About Canadian Television, Peter Kenter and Martin Levin described The Trouble with Tracy as "universally considered the worst Canadian TV show of all time, especially by those who have never seen it". Despite its reputation, the show developed a cult following, particularly among viewers who first encountered it as teenagers. Reruns continued after the original 1970–71 run, including CTV repeats in 1972–73 and daytime repeats on CITY-TV Toronto in 1981–82.

The Canadian rock band Barenaked Ladies featured a song titled "The Trouble With Tracy" on one of their early demo tapes. Apart from the title, the song had no connection to the television series.

In March 2003, The Comedy Network announced plans to air a pilot for a new version of The Trouble with Tracy, based on the original scripts. The pilot, scheduled for April 1, 2003, was described as the start of a planned 13-episode series starring Laurie Elliott as Tracy and David Lipovitch as Doug. A press conference was held, during which Elliott, Lipovitch, and Diane Nyland participated in interviews and promotional events.

The campaign was later revealed to be an April Fools' Day prank. The "pilot" consisted only of a brief introduction leading into an episode of The Gavin Crawford Show. The prank caught some media outlets by surprise, including the Toronto Star and Canada AM, which had reported on the revival plans as if they were genuine.

== See also ==
- The Starlost – another Canadian-produced series that faced similar budgetary and production challenges
- Old time radio
