= Michael Wayne (historian) =

Canadian historian (born 1947)

Michael Wayne (born 18 April 1947) is a Canadian historian of the United States known primarily for his work on the American South and race relations in the United States. He is a professor of history emeritus at the University of Toronto and a senior fellow at Toronto's University College.

== Early life and education ==
Wayne was born 18 April 1947. As an undergraduate, he studied at the University of Toronto and Amherst College. He received his PhD from Yale University where he studied under C. Vann Woodward.

== Career ==
Wayne is a professor of history emeritus at the University of Toronto and a senior fellow at Toronto's University College.

Wayne has written primarily about the American South and race relations in the United States. His major works include The Reshaping of Plantation Society: The Natchez District, 1860–1880 dealing, in part, with the impact of sharecropping and intermarriage between the White elite, Death of an Overseer: Reopening a Murder Investigation from the Plantation South, and Imagining Black America. The Reshaping of Plantation Society won the 1983 Saloutos Book Award of the Agricultural History Society.

His An Old South Morality Play: Reconsidering the Social Underpinnings of the Proslavery Ideology challenged popular views of class structure in the slaveholding South. In The Black Population of Canada West on the Eve of the American Civil War: A Reassessment Based on the Manuscript Census of 1861 he disputes the narrative that the typical Black residents of the Canadian West were fugitive slaves.

Wayne also wrote a satirical novel dealing with the follies of academia and the peculiarities of Canadian and American identities; titled Lincoln's Briefs, it has been published by Canadian Scholars' Press.

== Personal life ==
Michael Wayne is the son of Johnny Wayne, who was a member of the Canadian comedy duo Wayne and Shuster.

== Nonfiction books ==
- The Reshaping of Plantation Society: The Natchez District, 1860–1880
- Death of an Overseer: Reopening a Murder Investigation from the Plantation South
- Imagining Black America. An Old South Morality Play: Reconsidering the Social Underpinnings of the Proslavery Ideology

== See also ==
- Natchez Mississippi
