= Calpurnia (wife of Caesar) =

Last wife of Julius Caesar

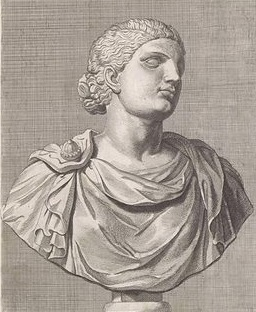
- Engraving by Hubertus Quellinus
- Born: c. 76 BC; Rome
- Died: after 44 BC; Rome
- Known for: The last wife of Julius Caesar
- Spouse(s): Julius Caesar (59–44 BC; his death)
- Father: Lucius Calpurnius Piso Caesoninus

Calpurnia (c. 76 BC – after 44 BC) was either the third or fourth wife of Julius Caesar, and the one to whom he was married at the time of his assassination. According to contemporary sources, she was a good and faithful wife, despite her husband's infidelity; and, forewarned of the attempt on his life, she endeavoured in vain to prevent his murder.

== Biography ==
=== Background ===
Born c. 76 BC, Calpurnia was the daughter of Lucius Calpurnius Piso Caesoninus, consul in 58 BC. Her half-brother was Lucius Calpurnius Piso, who would become consul in 15 BC.

=== Marriage ===
Calpurnia married Julius Caesar late in 59 BC, during the latter's consulship. She was about seventeen years old, and was likely younger than her stepdaughter, Julia. About this time, Julia married Gnaeus Pompeius Magnus, a former protégé of Sulla, who had been consul in 70 BC, and recently become one of Caesar's closest political allies. (Note: The formation of the First Triumvirate, between Caesar, Pompeius, and Marcus Licinius Crassus, who had been Pompeius' colleague in the consulate, is generally dated to 60 BC; and the marriage of Julia to Pompeius in 59 viewed as an act formalizing the alliance. The death of Julia in 54, together with that of Crassus the following year, were two of the circumstances that most strained the relationship between Caesar and Pompeius, ultimately leading to the outbreak of the Civil War in 49.)

Prior to their marriage, Caesar had been married either two or three times. In his childhood, Caesar had been betrothed to Cossutia, the daughter of a wealthy eques, although there is some uncertainty as to whether they were ever formally married. (Note: Plutarch refers to Pompeia as Caesar's third wife, implying that Cornelia was his second, and Cossutia his first.) According to Suetonius, he was obliged to break off their engagement when, at the age of sixteen, (Note: The passage in Suetonius is unclear as to the timing of his nomination, but states that Caesar was in his sixteenth year (and thus was fifteen years old) when his father died, and that he broke off his engagement to Cossutia during the following year, having been nominated Flamen Dialis.) he was nominated Flamen Dialis, a high-ranking priestly office whose holders had to be married by confarreatio, an ancient and solemn form of marriage that was open only to patricians.

Caesar then married Cornelia, a woman of patrician rank and the daughter of Lucius Cornelius Cinna, at that time the most powerful man in Rome. By all accounts, their marriage was a happy one, and the product of their union was Julia, Caesar's only legitimate child. Following the downfall and death of Cinna and the ruin of his faction, the dictator Sulla commanded Caesar to divorce his rival's daughter, a demand that Caesar refused at great personal risk, for it nearly cost him his life. Cornelia died in 69 or 68 BC, as her husband was preparing to set out for Spain.

On his return, Caesar married Pompeia, a granddaughter of Sulla. Their marriage ended in scandal. In 63 BC, Caesar had been elected Pontifex Maximus, receiving as his official residence a house on the Via Sacra. Here the sacred rites of the Bona Dea, from which all men were excluded, were celebrated in the winter of 62. But an ambitious young nobleman named Publius Claudius Pulcher entered the house disguised as a woman, ostensibly for the purpose of seducing Pompeia. His subsequent discovery shocked the Roman aristocracy, and rumors swirled about Pompeia's fidelity. Caesar felt that he had no choice but to divorce Pompeia, not because he personally believed the rumors, but because the wife of the Pontifex Maximus had to be above suspicion. (Note: This occasion gives rise to the English proverb, "Caesar's wife must be above suspicion".)

Caesar then married Calpurnia. Her contemporaries describe Calpurnia as a humble, often shy woman. By all accounts Calpurnia was a faithful and virtuous wife, and seems to have tolerated Caesar's affairs: he was rumored to have seduced the wives of a number of prominent men, including both of his allies in the First Triumvirate; and he had for some time been intimate with Servilia, a relationship that was an open secret at Rome. It was rumored that Caesar was the father of Servilia's son, Marcus Junius Brutus, although this is improbable on chronological grounds, (Note: Brutus was born in 85 BC, and since Caesar is generally accepted to have been born in 100 BC that means he would have been only fifteen at Brutus's birth.) and that Servilia attempted to interest Caesar in her daughter, Junia Tertia—who according to other rumors, was also Caesar's daughter. (Note: This, or some similar rumor, may be the reason why Pompeius is said to have referred to Caesar as "Aegisthus". In Greek mythology, Aegisthus was conceived in an incestuous union when his father, Thyestes, raped his own daughter, Pelopia, following a prophecy that such a son would avenge Thyestes against his brother, Atreus, who had seized the throne of Mycenae. Abandoned as an infant, Aegisthus was raised by his uncle, whom he would later murder. Driven out of Mycenae by Atreus' son, Agamemnon, Aegisthus took his cousin's wife, Clytemnestra, as a lover during the Trojan War, and with her help murdered Agamemnon on his return. Agamemnon's son, Orestes, then avenged his father by killing both Aegisthus and his own mother.) Caesar also carried on affairs with the Mauretanian queen, Eunoë, and most famously with Cleopatra, the Queen of Egypt, who claimed that he was the father of her son, Ptolemy XV, better known as "Caesarion". No children resulted from Calpurnia's marriage to Caesar.

=== Premonition ===
According to the Roman historians, Caesar's murder was foretold by a number of ill omens, as well as the Etruscan haruspex Spurinna, who warned him of great personal danger either on or by the Ides of March in 44 BC. The night before his assassination, Calpurnia dreamed that Caesar had been wounded, and lay dying in her arms. In the morning, she begged him not to meet the senate, as he had planned, and moved by her distress and entreaties, he resolved not to go. But Decimus Junius Brutus, one of Caesar's closest friends, whom he had recently appointed Praetor Peregrinus, and secretly one of the conspirators against him, came to the house and persuaded Caesar to ignore the omens, and go to the senate.

=== Widowhood ===
Following her husband's assassination, there is a story of her rushing out of her house in grief accompanied by several women and slaves. Calpurnia delivered all of Caesar's personal papers, including his will and notes, along with his most precious possessions, to the consul Mark Antony, one of Caesar's most trusted allies, who had not been involved in the conspiracy.

Calpurnia is peculiarly absent in Octavian propaganda, which has been regarded by historians as somewhat mysterious. The only later attestation to her is an inscription by a freedwoman named Anthis which states "She was the wife of Caesar, the great divinity" which puts its dating to at least 42 BC when Caesar was deified.

== Coinage ==
There has been some speculation that Calpurnia may have stood as a model for the goddess Victory on coins struck by Caesar for his triumph after returning from Spain, but this is not generally accepted. The goddess Venus on the aureus minted by Caesar for his fifth consulship has also been interpreted to have been modeled on Calpurnia.

== Legacy ==
The Roman tribe Calpurnia was named in her honor.

== Cultural depictions ==
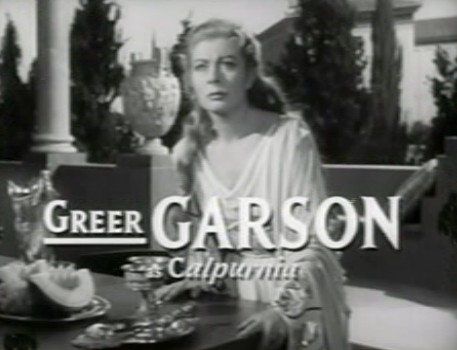
Greer Garson as Calpurnia

- In Shakespeare's Julius Caesar, Calpurnia has a dream that a statue of Caesar was flowing with blood as many Romans wash their hands in the blood. She also sees in her dream that Julius Caesar would die in her arms.
- Calpurnia was portrayed by Gertrude Michael in Cleopatra (1934), Greer Garson in the 1953 adaptation of Shakespeare's Julius Caesar, Gwen Watford in Cleopatra (1963), Joan Sims in Carry On Cleo (1964), Jill Bennett in the 1970 adaptation of Julius Caesar and Valeria Golino in the 2002 miniseries Julius Caesar.
- Calpurnia was shown solving a murder in Mist of Prophecies (2002)—part of the Roma Sub Rosa series by Steven Saylor. She gets Gordianus the Finder to look into a threat to her husband in a later book in this series, The Triumph of Caesar (2008). She is portrayed as a woman of formidable intelligence and efficiency, utterly devoted to her husband's interests, but with an incongruous fascination with trying to foretell the future.
- Calpurnia was portrayed by Haydn Gwynne in HBO's series Rome. She is depicted as proud and traditional and having had a vision of Caesar's death.
- Shakespeare's Calpurnia was portrayed by Sylvia Lennick in Wayne and Shuster's comedy sketch "Rinse the Blood Off My Toga", parodied as a hysterical Italian-American housewife, repeatedly wailing "I told him, Julie! Don't go!" in a Bronx accent.

== Bibliography ==
- Gaius Julius Caesar, Commentarii de Bello Gallico (Commentaries on the Gallic War).
- Marcus Velleius Paterculus, Compendium of Roman History.
- Lucius Mestrius Plutarchus (Plutarch), Lives of the Noble Greeks and Romans.
- Gaius Suetonius Tranquillus, De Vita Caesarum (Lives of the Caesars, or The Twelve Caesars).
- Appianus Alexandrinus (Appian), Bellum Civile (The Civil War).
- Lucius Cassius Dio Cocceianus (Cassius Dio), Roman History.
- Smith, William, ed., (1867). Dictionary of Greek and Roman Biography and Mythology, in 3 volumes. [First published 1844–1849 (John Murray)]. Boston: Little, Brown and Company. Vols. 1–3
- Jerome Carcopino (translator), Cicero: The Secrets of his Correspondence, Volume 1, Taylor & Francis (1951).
