= Diane Nyland =

Canadian actress, director and choreographer

- Born: 20 January 1944; Kitchener, Ontario, Canada
- Died: 6 October 2014 (aged 70); Toronto, Ontario, Canada
- Occupations: Actress, director
- Known for: The Trouble with Tracy

Diane Nyland Proctor (20 January 1944 – 6 October 2014) was a Canadian actress, director and choreographer. She is perhaps best known for having portrayed the title role in the infamous 1970-71 CTV television series The Trouble with Tracy.

She joined the National Ballet of Canada for two seasons, turning to acting in the mid-1960s. She joined the Charlottetown Festival in 1965 and remained there for several years, with roles including Josie Pye in the original production of Anne of Green Gables - The Musical and Belinda in Johnny Belinda. She was cast in the title role in CTV Television's The Trouble with Tracy in 1970. After that show's production run ended in 1971, she became a director and choreographer in musical theatre, with only one further television role, in a 1992 episode of Street Legal.

Her directorial credits included both Toronto and national touring productions of musicals such as Dancing in the Dark, Rose Is a Rose, Mame, Oklahoma!, My Fair Lady, Guys and Dolls and I Do! I Do!. She served as artistic director of the Kawartha Summer Theatre in Kawartha Lakes in the 1990s; in 1997 she returned to the Charlottetown Festival to direct productions of both Johnny Belinda and Anne of Green Gables - The Musical.

== Death ==
Nyland died in Toronto from heart failure and chronic obstructive pulmonary disease on 6 October 2014.

== Awards ==
- 1986 - Dora Award winner, Outstanding Choreography for Nunsense

== Career ==
=== Television ===
- 1970-71 - The Trouble with Tracy
- 1992 - Street Legal, guest on episode "It's a Wise Child"

=== Theatre ===
- 1968-69 - Charlottetown Festival, Johnny Belinda as Belinda MacDonald
