= The Red Skelton Show =

Television series

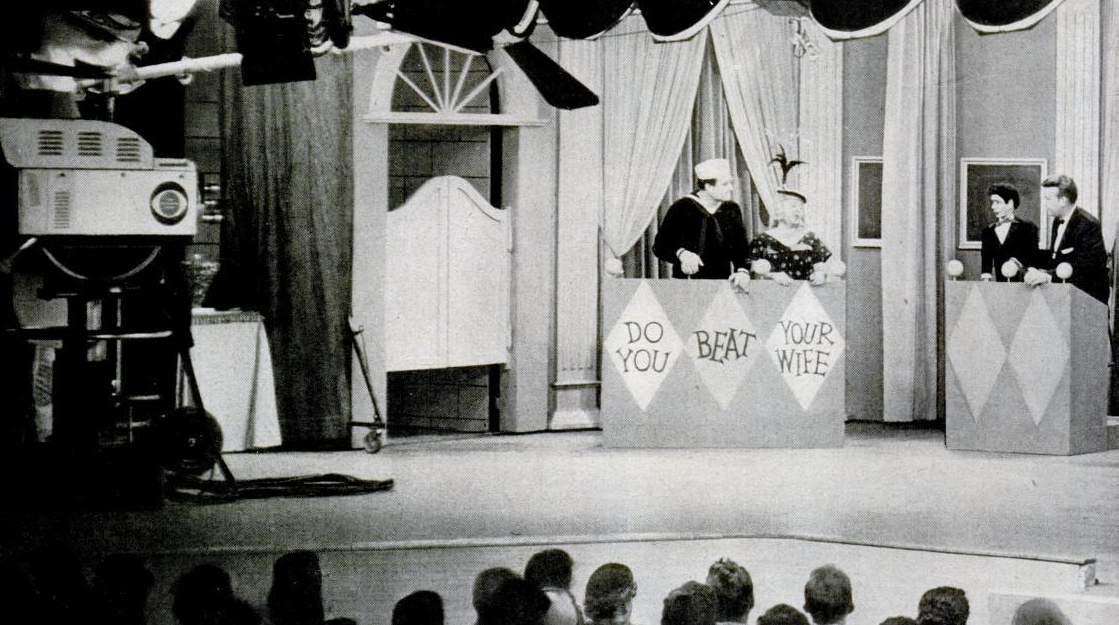
- Red Skelton and Mickey Rooney at dress rehearsal for The Red Skelton Show at studio 33, January 15, 1957.
- Also known as: The Red Skelton Hour
- Genre: Variety
- Directed by: Seymour Berns; Jack Donohue; John Gaunt; Ed Hiller; Bill Hobin; Terry Kyne; Howard A. Quinn; Martin Rackin
- Presented by: Red Skelton
- Voices of: Art Gilmore
- Theme music composer: David Rose
- Opening theme: "Holiday for Strings". (Date of Registration with U.S. Copyright 26-3-1942)
- Composers: David Rose; Jack Lloyd; Alan Copeland; Nelson Barclift
- Country of origin: United States
- Original language: English
- No. of seasons: 20
- No. of episodes: 672

Production
- Executive producer: Guy Della-Cioppa
- Producers: Cecil Barker; Seymour Berns; Ben Brady; Dee Caruso; Perry Cross; Gerald Gardner; Red Skelton; Douglas Whitney
- Running time: 22–24 minutes (1951–1962; 1970–1971); 45–48 minutes (1954; 1962–1970)
- Production companies: Van Bernard Productions; Sursum Productions

Original release
- Network: NBC (1951–1953; 1970–1971); CBS (1953–1970)
- Release: September 30, 1951 – August 1, 1971

The Red Skelton Show is an American television comedy/variety show that aired from 1951 to 1971. In the decade prior to hosting the show, Richard "Red" Skelton had a successful career as a radio and motion pictures star. Although his television series is largely associated with CBS, where it appeared for more than sixteen years, it actually began and ended on NBC. During its run, the program received three Emmy Awards, for Skelton as best comedian and the program as best comedy show during its initial season, and an award for comedy writing in 1961. In 1959 Skelton also received a Golden Globe Award for Best TV Show.

== Origins: 1950s ==
Red Skelton's network television program began at the start of the 1951 fall season on NBC, sponsored by Procter & Gamble. The MGM agreement with Skelton for television performances did not allow him to go on the air before September 30, 1951. After two seasons on Sunday nights, the program was picked up by CBS in the fall of 1953 and moved to Tuesday night, the time slot with which it would become primarily associated during most of its run. After his first CBS season the program was moved to Wednesday night and expanded to an hour for the summer of 1954 only; it was then reduced back to a half-hour for a time, later expanded again, returning to Tuesday night, where it would remain for the next sixteen years, co-sponsored by Johnson's Wax and Pet Milk between 1955 and 1962.

The program was produced at Desilu Productions and CBS Television City in Hollywood, and over five years, from 1955 through 1960, was telecast in color approximately 100 times. In 1960, Skelton purchased the Charlie Chaplin Studios, with plans to continue using the facility for his television show and for making films. It was the most-colorcast of the few programs CBS aired in color during this period. By 1960, CBS no longer manufactured television receivers — unlike its rival NBC's parent company, RCA — and pulled the plug on colorcasts. With the exception of a few specials and some yearly broadcasts of The Wizard of Oz, CBS would not colorcast again on a regular basis until the 1965–1966 fall season, when the network could no longer avoid public demand amidst rising sales in color television receivers.

Skelton was infatuated with his appearance on color television, and he cajoled CBS to colorcast the program. In 1961, Skelton also invested in three rental remote vans with live, film, and color videotape capability. Although visionary, the venture in color was premature and, when it failed, CBS bought Skelton's facilities (formerly Charlie Chaplin Studios) as part of renewing Skelton's contract.

From 1956 to 1962, Sherwood Schwartz, later widely known for creating the popular sitcoms Gilligan's Island and The Brady Bunch, among others, was head writer of Skelton's show, for which Schwartz won an Emmy Award in 1961.

== Format during the 1960s ==
On September 25, 1962, the program was again expanded to a full hour, becoming The Red Skelton Hour. It remained in this longer format for the balance of its CBS run. The format of the program during this period was quite simple.

=== Pre-opening ===
This pre-opening format was changed slightly each year during the rest of the show's CBS run, but followed this basic format.

Instead of a traditional opening title card, announcer Art Gilmore would intone, "From Television City in Hollywood", and Skelton would perform a brief comedic blackout sketch, ending with the show's resident vocal group (the Skeltones) singing the words "The Red Skelton Hour" (beginning in the 1964–1965 season, Skelton would simply stand alone, smiling and waving at the camera, spotlighted on a darkened stage as the shot zoomed in (dressed in some seasons as one of his various characters), as Gilmore would announce the title, and (in later seasons) the singers sang the title), leading into a brief musical "song and dance" number (about 90 seconds long) performed in lyrical song by several smiling male and female dancers as they danced and moved cheerfully across the large stage. This introductory number would have a certain visual theme, such as gardening, college football, the signs of the zodiac, etc., and the set, the dancers' costumes, and the lyrics of the dancers' song would reflect the theme. After the dancers sang the first two stanzas, they continued the song, singing "our guest star ..." followed by the guest's name, matched with a camera shot of the guest (most evenings there was at least one major celebrity guest as well as a musical guest); "David Rose and his orchestra," with a shot of Rose; the singers (originally the Modernaires; the Skel-tones by 1963; by the fall of 1964 as the Alan Copeland Singers (Copeland, the credited vocal arranger of the show, was originally a member of the Modernaires); and by the 1969–1970 season as The Jimmy Joyce Singers and the dancers (introduced after 1964 as the Tom Hansen Dancers, after the show's credited choreographer); and finally introducing Skelton as the star of the show; the assembled dancers looking "stage left" anticipating Skelton's entrance on stage to begin his opening monologue.

For the final CBS season (1969–1970), a cold open blackout sketch was added, featuring the antics of two alien moon men, green in color, performing comedic antics on the moon, as the song "Mah Nà Mah Nà" was playing. This led immediately into the dancers' routine.

=== Opening monologue ===
After the opening song-and-dance routine, Skelton opened with a monologue. The monologue often lapsed into character humor, including "Gertrude and Heathcliff, the Two Seagulls", which he performed by crossing his eyes and sticking his thumbs into his armpits for "wings" (Johnny Carson, who was a writer on this program for a period, reminisced about writing for this spot). Skelton performed the "Doughnut Dunkers," one of his earliest signature routines, in a 1964 episode during this monologue.

=== Guest stars ===
This was followed by a guest-star performance, often a singer. Musical accompaniment was generally provided by the show's orchestra and led by its well-known bandleader, David Rose. He was also the composer of the show's familiar signature tune, "Holiday for Strings". The guest then appeared with Skelton in a comedy sketch. In other episodes, the Tom Hansen Dancers would perform another song-and-dance number, sometimes joined by the guest star.

Among the notable guest stars on the program were western film stars Amanda Blake and Roscoe Ates, who played a sheriff in the 1961 episode "Candid Clem". John Wayne, Jack Benny, Phyllis Diller, George Raft, Martha Raye, Robert Vaughn, Audrey Meadows, Carol Lawrence, Shirley Bassey, Godfrey Cambridge and Carol Channing also made appearances. Popular television actress Phyllis Avery appeared twice in "Clem's Watermelons" (1961) and "Nothing But the Tooth" (1962). Billy Gray, who played Bud Anderson Jr. on "Father Knows Best", guest starred after the former show ended its six-year run.

==== Musical guests ====
The Beach Boys made their network television debut as musical guests on the September 24, 1963 episode, singing "Surfin' USA." The Rolling Stones videotaped three songs in London for a 1964 Skelton show. Another British Invasion band, The Kinks, appeared in early 1965 (shortly before the American Federation of Musicians banned them from touring in the US for the next four years). The Supremes and the Motown Sound visited the Skelton hour in 1965. Other musical guests included Bobby Rydell, the Lettermen, Vikki Carr, Horst Jankowski, Gloria Loring, the New Christy Minstrels, the Doodletown Pipers, Herb Alpert and the Tijuana Brass, the Association, Lulu, Johnny Mathis, Tom Jones, Matt Monro, Lou Rawls and Dionne Warwick.

=== Comedy sketches ===
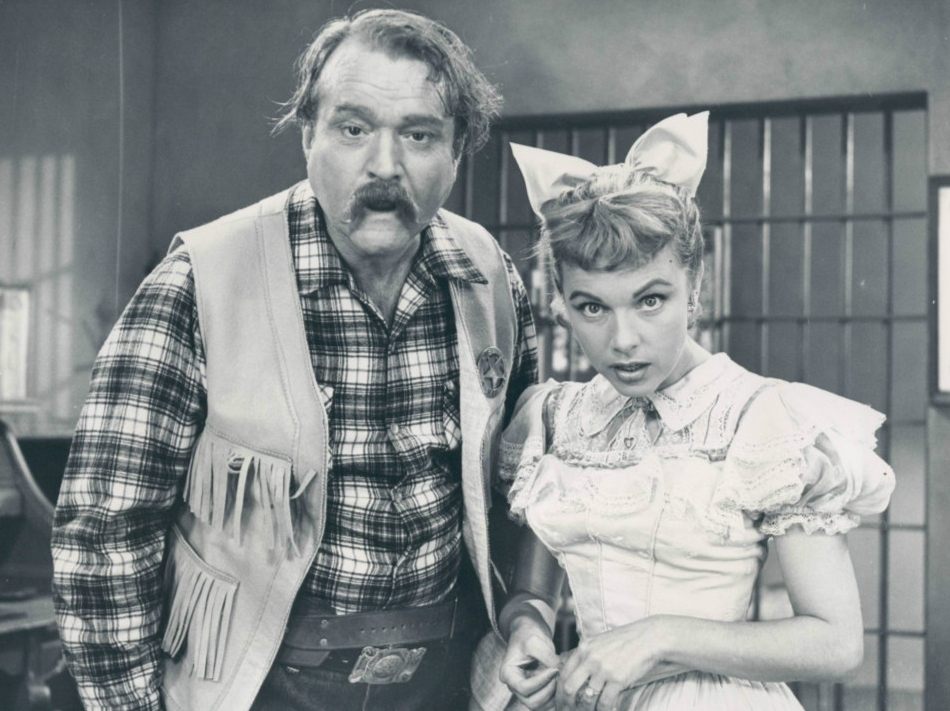
Skelton as Deadeye with actress Terry Moore, 1959.

The sketches were usually built around one of Red's many characters, including "Deadeye", an incredibly inept sheriff in the Old West; "San Fernando Red", a shady real estate agent (named for the San Fernando Valley, which was still a largely rural area when the show began); "Cauliflower McPugg", a punchdrunk boxer; "George Appleby", a hen-pecked husband; "Junior, the Mean Widdle Kid" (whose trademark line was, "If I dood it, I get a whippin' ... I DOOD IT!"), "Clem Kadiddlehopper", a hick who was identified in at least one sketch as being from Cornpone County, Tennessee; and "Freddie the Freeloader". Freddie, regarded by many as Skelton's signature character, was a bum with a heart of gold, who was played by Skelton (and in one episode in 1961, by Ed Sullivan) in clown makeup reminiscent of Emmett Kelly, but somehow not as sad. Freddie could be either a speaking character or totally pantomimed. While many of Skelton's other characters originated on his radio shows, Freddie was created for television in 1952. Skelton's father, Joseph, who died two months before his youngest son, Richard, was born, was once a clown for the Hagenbeck–Wallace Circus. Skelton, who had spent some time working for the same circus as a youth, copied his father's clown makeup for Freddie. During the sketches, Skelton and the celebrity guest star would sometimes break character and make good-natured wisecracks at one another.

In its later years, the show generally finished with "The Silent Spot", with Skelton pantomiming Freddie or another silent character. It was hard for some younger viewers to accept that such an overwhelmingly visual, physical performer had once been a staple of radio. After "The Silent Spot", the show closed with Red looking into the camera and saying sincerely, "Good night and may God bless."

The Tom Hansen Dancers would return in their costumes from the pre-opening song-and-dance number and invite the audience to join the show the following week, singing to the tune of "Holiday for Strings" as the closing credits appeared.

While the vast majority of Skelton's skits were comedy, there were a few serious segments. One memorable segment came in 1969, when Skelton performed a self-written monologue about the Pledge of Allegiance, providing commentary on the meaning of each phrase of the Pledge. CBS received 200,000 requests for copies; the company subsequently released the monologue as a single recording by Columbia Records.

=== Skelton television characters ===
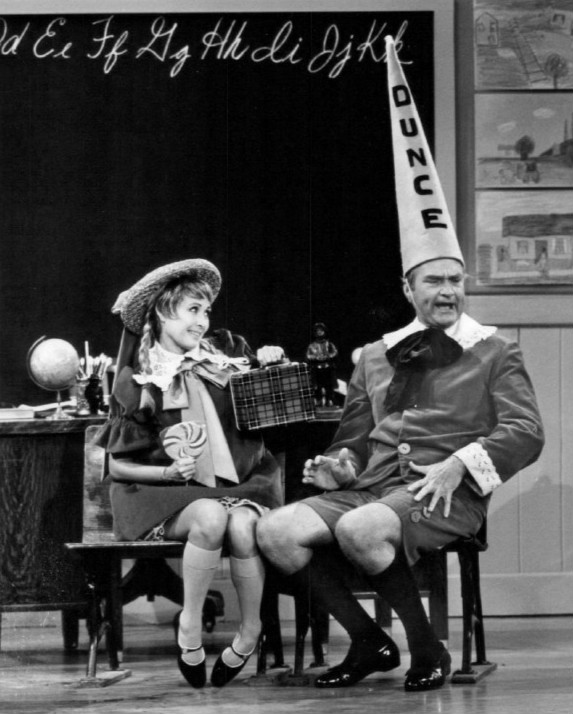
Junior

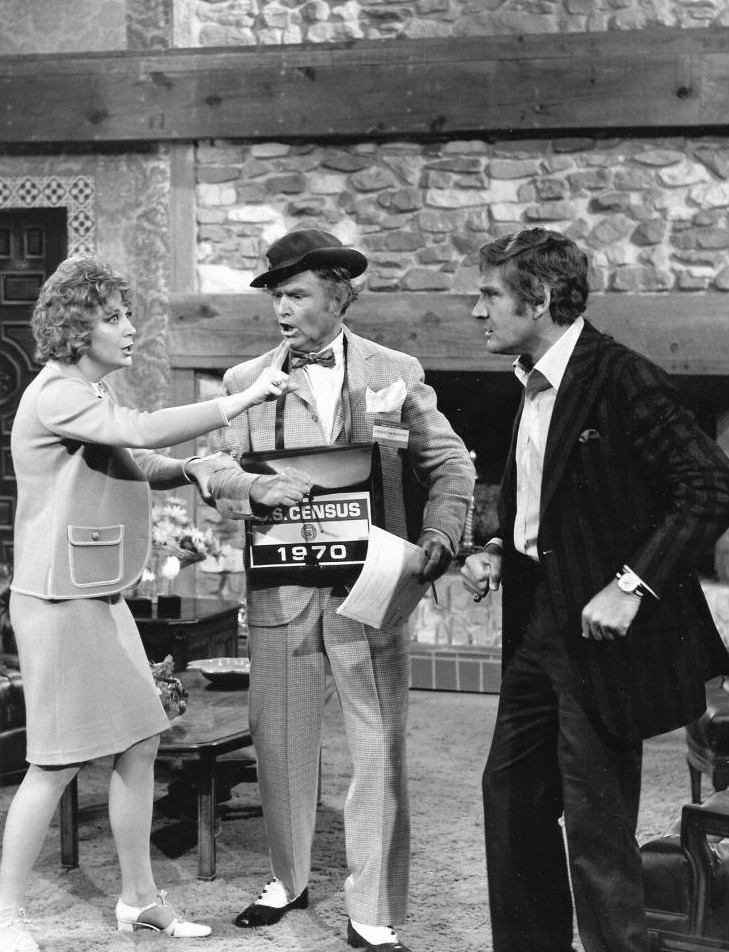
Clem Kadiddlehopper

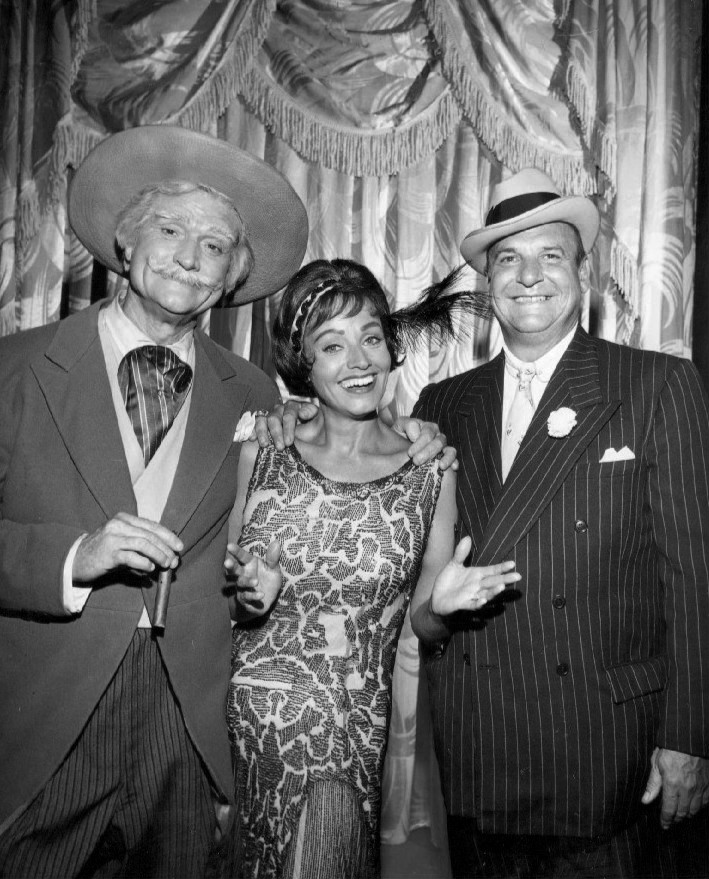
San Fernando Red

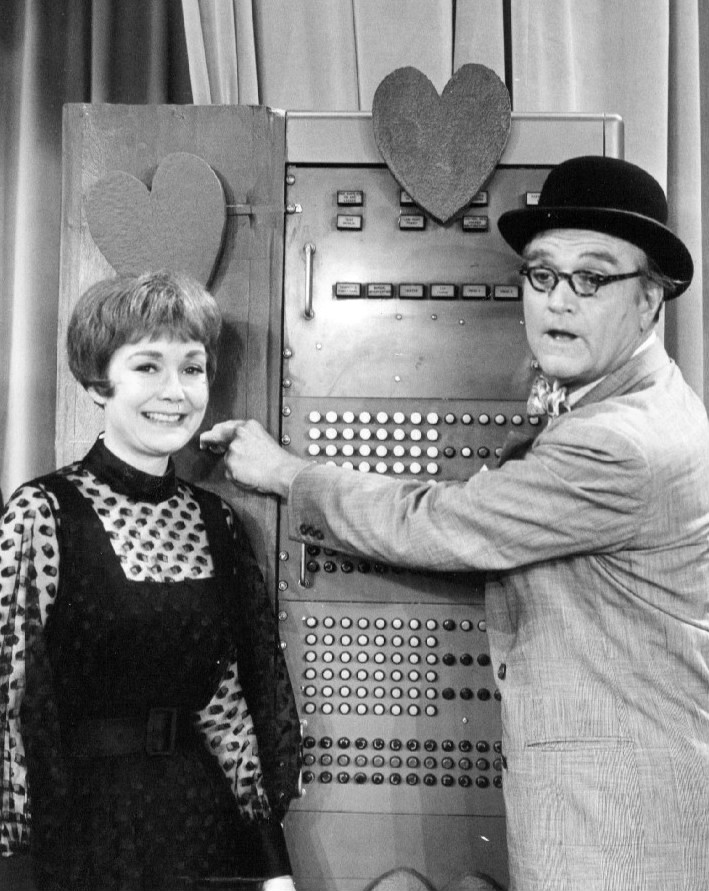
George Appleby

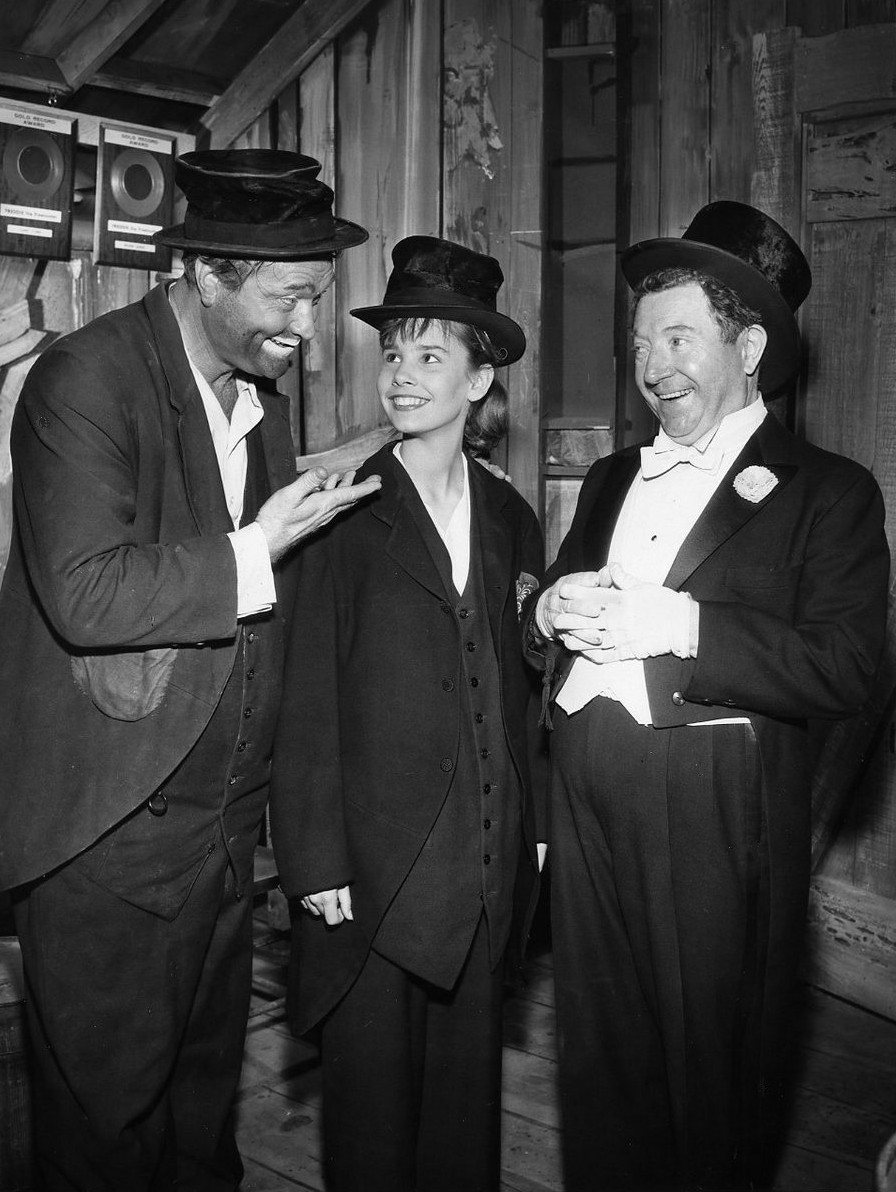
Freddie the Freeloader

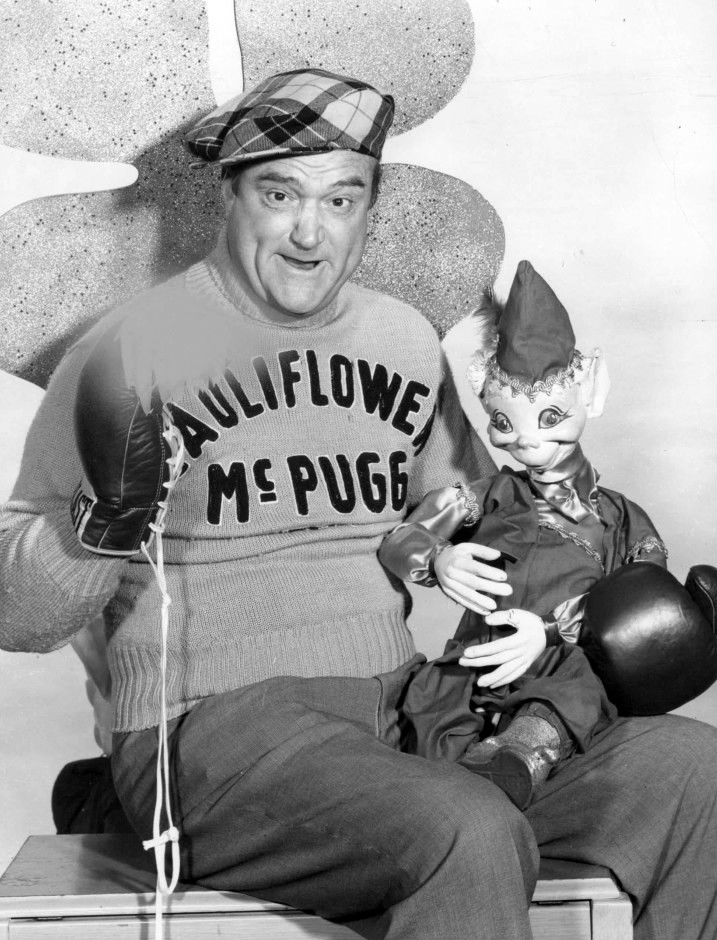
Cauliflower McPugg

== Final years: 1970–1971 ==
CBS ended its association with the program in early 1970. This apparently marked the beginning of one of several attempts by CBS to downplay programming (even shows gaining relatively strong Nielsen ratings) whose primary appeal was to "Middle America", an audience more rural and also somewhat older than that generally desired by network television advertisers. Marketers were moving towards a younger, "hipper" and more urban audience (see the "rural purge"). Skelton was reportedly heartbroken at the cancellation.

=== The move to NBC: 1970 ===
At least in part due to Skelton's iconic status, the program was picked up by NBC in late 1970. However, the program that aired was quite different from the one that Skelton's CBS audience was used to seeing. The new set was dark, devoid of the bright and colorful backdrops that viewers had seen on CBS. The show was cut back to its original half-hour length and it was moved from Tuesday to Monday nights.

Perhaps the biggest change was that the show began to incorporate "regulars" for the first time along with Skelton, Rose, and Rose's orchestra. A repertory company of young, comic actors and actresses was added, as well as veteran performers such as Eve McVeagh and The Burgundy Street Singers who had been previously seen after an abortive comeback on network television by 1950s folk singing star Jimmie Rodgers on ABC two years earlier.

The new format never really worked; the audience sensed that there was little rapport between Skelton and his repertory company. The program ended in March 1971, although selected programs from this final season were rerun on NBC on Sunday nights during mid-1971 by Procter & Gamble, so it could be said that Skelton's network television career had ended exactly where it had begun.

== Skelton's later TV career ==
Skelton continued to make appearances for many years afterwards, increasingly as a nostalgic figure, but was never again a regular feature of network television programming. He was awarded the Academy of Television Arts and Sciences Governors Award, a lifetime achievement award, in 1986. Skelton was inducted into the Academy of Television Arts & Sciences' Television Hall of Fame in 1989.

== Broadcast history and Nielsen ratings ==
Season	Time slot (ET)	Rank	Rating
1951–1952	Sunday at 10:00–10:30 pm on NBC	4	50.2
1952–1953	Sunday at 7:00–7:30 pm on NBC	28	33.7 (Tied with The Lone Ranger)
1953–1954	Tuesday at 8:30–9:00 pm on CBS (September 1953 – June 1954); Wednesday at 8:00–9:00 pm on CBS (July–September 1954)	Not in the Top 30	
1954–1955	Tuesday at 8:00–9:00 pm on CBS (September–December 1954); Tuesday at 9:30–10:30 pm on CBS (January 1955 – June 1961)	Not in the Top 30	
1955–1956	Tuesday at 8:00–9:00 pm on CBS (September–December 1954); Tuesday at 9:30–10:30 pm on CBS (January 1955 – June 1961)	14	32.3
1956–1957	Tuesday at 8:00–9:00 pm on CBS (September–December 1954); Tuesday at 9:30–10:30 pm on CBS (January 1955 – June 1961)	15	31.4 (Tied with The Lineup)
1957–1958	Tuesday at 8:00–9:00 pm on CBS (September–December 1954); Tuesday at 9:30–10:30 pm on CBS (January 1955 – June 1961)	15	28.9
1958–1959	Tuesday at 8:00–9:00 pm on CBS (September–December 1954); Tuesday at 9:30–10:30 pm on CBS (January 1955 – June 1961)	12	28.5
1959–1960	Tuesday at 8:00–9:00 pm on CBS (September–December 1954); Tuesday at 9:30–10:30 pm on CBS (January 1955 – June 1961)	5	30.8
1960–1961	Tuesday at 8:00–9:00 pm on CBS (September–December 1954); Tuesday at 9:30–10:30 pm on CBS (January 1955 – June 1961)	19	24.0
1961–1962	Tuesday at 9:00–9:30 pm on CBS	6	27.1
1962–1963	Tuesday at 8:30–9:30 pm on CBS	2	31.1 (Tied with Candid Camera)
1963–1964	Tuesday at 8:00–9:00 pm on CBS	11	25.7
1964–1965	Tuesday at 8:30–9:30 pm on CBS	6	27.4
1965–1966	Tuesday at 8:30–9:30 pm on CBS	4	27.6
1966–1967	Tuesday at 8:30–9:30 pm on CBS	2	28.2
1967–1968	Tuesday at 8:30–9:30 pm on CBS	7	25.3
1968–1969	Tuesday at 8:30–9:30 pm on CBS	11	23.3 (Tied with Mission: Impossible and Bewitched)
1969–1970	Tuesday at 8:30–9:30 pm on CBS	7	23.8
1970–1971	Monday at 7:30–8:00 pm on NBC (September 1970 – March 1971); Sunday at 8:30–9:00 pm on NBC (June–August 1971)	Not in the Top 30	

== Awards and nominations ==
Primetime Emmy Awards
Year	Season	Category	Recipient(s)	Status
1952	One	Outstanding Comedy Series	N/A	Won
1952	One	Best Comedian or Comedienne	Red Skelton	Won
1959	Eight	Outstanding Comedy Series	N/A	Nominated
1960	Nine	Outstanding Comedy Series	N/A	Nominated
1960	Nine	Outstanding Directing for a Comedy Series	Seymour Berns	Nominated
1961	Ten	Outstanding Writing for a Comedy Series	Sherwood Schwartz, David O'Brien, Martin Ragaway, Arthur Phillips, Al Schwartz, Red Skelton	Won
1962	Eleven	Outstanding Comedy Series	N/A	Nominated
1962	Eleven	Outstanding Directing for a Comedy Series	Seymour Berns	Nominated
1962	Eleven	Outstanding Writing for a Comedy Series	Ed Simmons, David O'Brien, Martin Ragaway, Arthur Phillips, Al Schwartz, Sherwood Schwartz, Red Skelton	Nominated
1963	Twelve	Outstanding Variety Series	N/A	Nominated
1963	Twelve	Outstanding Directing for a Comedy Series	Seymour Berns	Nominated
1963	Twelve	Outstanding Writing for a Comedy Series	Ed Simmons, Dave O'Brien, Martin Ragaway, Arthur Phillips, Larry Rhine, Mort Greene, Hugh Wedlock Jr., Red Skelton, Bruce Howard, Rick Mittleman	Nominated
1965	Fourteen	Outstanding Individual Achievements in Entertainment – Performers	Red Skelton	Nominated
1966	Fifteen	Outstanding Variety Series	Seymour Berns	Nominated
1967	Sixteen	Outstanding Video Tape Editing	Lewis W. Smith	Nominated
1970	Nineteen	Outstanding Choreography	Tom Hansen	Nominated
