= The Lineup (TV series) =

American radio and television series

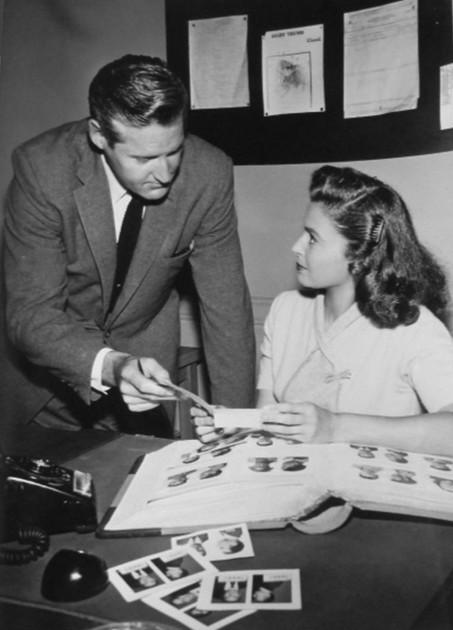
- Marshall Reed as Fred Asher with guest star Donna Martell
- Also known as: San Francisco Beat
- Genre: Police drama
- Written by: E. Jack Neuman; Sidney Marshall; Joseph Petracca
- Directed by: William Asher; Earl Bellamy; Seymour Berns; Thomas Carr; Paul Henreid; Hollingsworth Morse; Don Siegel; Harold D. Schuster
- Starring: Warner Anderson; Tom Tully; Marshall Reed
- Country of origin: United States
- Original language: English
- No. of seasons: 6
- No. of episodes: 190

Production
- Producers: Cecil Baker; Jaime Del Valle; Robert Sparks
- Running time: 30 mins. (1954–1959); 60 mins. (1960)

Original release
- Network: CBS
- Release: October 1, 1954 – January 27, 1960

The Lineup is an American police drama which aired on CBS radio from 1950 to 1953 and on CBS television from 1954 to 1960.

Syndicated reruns of the series were broadcast under the title San Francisco Beat.

== Radio ==
The radio version depicted the investigations of Lieutenant Ben Guthrie (played by Bill Johnstone, one of several actors to play The Shadow on radio) and Sergeant Matt Greb (played by Wally Maher until his death on December 27, 1951), later replaced by Sergeant Pete Carger (played by Jack Moyles), detectives in the police force of an unnamed "great American city". The primary writer of the radio series was Blake Edwards.

== Television ==
The television version was set specifically in San Francisco and was produced with the cooperation of the San Francisco Police Department, which received a credit at the close of each episode. It starred Warner Anderson as Guthrie and Tom Tully as Grebb. Grebb was now an inspector instead of a sergeant because at the time the series was made there was no such rank as sergeant in the Bureau of Inspectors, SFPD's investigative division, and a full inspector was the closest equivalent to the generic detective sergeant the character had been on radio. The TV version, a CBS Television production, was filmed on location, using Desilu's production facilities.

In the final season, the show expanded to an hour, and the Grebb character was replaced by a number of younger officers, including Policewoman Sandy McAllister (played by Rachel Ames). Others in the cast were Jan Brooks, Bob Palmer, Skip Ward, William Leslie, Tod Burton, Marshall Reed, and Ruta Lee. The announcer was Art Gilmore.

The Lineup was a Top 20 Nielsen ratings hit for three of its six seasons during its original network run. The series finished at number 17 in the Nielsen ratings for the 1955–1956 season, at number 16 for 1956–1957 and at number 18 for 1957–1958. It received an Emmy nomination for Best Action or Adventure Series in 1956.

== Cast ==
- Warner Anderson as Det. Lt. Ben Guthrie
- Tom Tully as Inspector Matt Grebb (seasons 1–5)

== Episodes ==
=== Season 1: 1954–55 ===
No. overall	No. in season	Title	Directed by	Written by	Original release date
1	1	"The Paisley Gang"	Thomas Carr	E. Jack Neuman	October 1, 1954
2	2	"Hit and Run"	Unknown	Unknown	October 8, 1954
3	3	"John Doe 37"	Unknown	Unknown	October 15, 1954
4	4	"The Morgan Murder Case"	Unknown	Unknown	October 22, 1954
5	5	"The Kenovak Murder Case"	Unknown	E. Jack Neuman	October 29, 1954
6	6	"Tappan and Long"	Felix Feist	James Poe	November 5, 1954
7	7	"The Finley Case"	Earl Bellamy	E. Jack Neuman	November 12, 1954
8	8	"Cop Killer"	Earl Bellamy	Blake Edwards	November 19, 1954
9	9	"The Dunn Case"	Felix Feist	E. Jack Neuman	November 26, 1954
10	10	"Mexican Bandit"	Earl Bellamy	John Vlahos	December 3, 1954
11	11	"Cop Shooting"	Earl Bellamy	Joseph Petracca	December 10, 1954
12	12	"The Davis Murder Case"	Unknown	Unknown	December 17, 1954
13	13	"The Christmas Story"	Hollingsworth Morse	E. Jack Neuman	December 24, 1954
14	14	"Dial 116"	Unknown	Unknown	December 31, 1954
15	15	"Roberts Dress Shop Robbery"	Unknown	Unknown	January 7, 1955
16	16	"The Wildcat Chase"	Thomas Carr	DeVallon Scott	January 14, 1955
17	17	"The Sub-Machine Case"	Hollingsworth Morse	E. Jack Neuman	1955
18	18	"The Trussing Case"	Hollingsworth Morse	Joseph Petracca	January 28, 1955
19	19	"The Griswold Case"	Hollingsworth Morse	Sidney Marshall	February 4, 1955
20	20	"The Hacker Case"	TBD	TBD	1955
21	21	"The Danny Burke Case"	Harold D. Schuster	Sidney Marshall	1955
22	22	"The Paymaster Office Robbery"	TBD	TBD	1955
23	23	"The Sniper Case"	TBD	TBD	1955
24	24	"San Francisco Playboy"	TBD	TBD	1955
25	25	"The Joseph Dorsey Case"	TBD	TBD	1955
26	26	"Callow Car Stealing"	TBD	TBD	1955
27	27	"Girl Safecrackers"	TBD	TBD	1955
28	28	"The Ann Brennizer Case"	Hollingsworth Morse	Sidney Marshall	1955
29	29	"One Man Crime"	TBD	E. Jack Neuman	1955
30	30	"The Falling Out Of Thieves"	TBD	TBD	1955
31	31	"The Mike Fielding Case"	TBD	TBD	1955
32	32	"Theater Robbery Case"	TBD	TBD	1955
33	33	"The Assault Case"	Harold D. Schuster	Sidney Marshall	1955
34	34	"The Messenger Case"	TBD	TBD	1955
35	35	"The Murphy Robbery Case"	TBD	TBD	1955
36	36	"The Husky Slugger Case"	TBD	TBD	1955
37	37	"The Kasino Case"	Harold D. Schuster	Leonard Heideman	1955
38	38	"The Keating Case"	TBD	TBD	1955
39	39	"Shopwell Market Robberies"	TBD	TBD	1955

=== Season 2: 1955–56 ===
No. overall	No. in season	Title	Directed by	Written by	Original release date
40	1	"The T.V. Case"	Hollingsworth Morse and Harold D. Schuster	Sidney Marshall	September 30, 1955
41	2	"The Silk Stocking Case"	Harold D. Schuster	Montgomery Pittman	October 7, 1955
42	3	"The Green Case"	Unknown	Sidney Marshall	October 14, 1955
43	4	"The Mad Husband Case"	Unknown	Unknown	October 21, 1955
44	5	"The Chinatown Case"	Unknown	Unknown	October 28, 1955
45	6	"The Theatrical Bandit"	Unknown	Unknown	November 4, 1955
46	7	"The Garrity Case"	Unknown	Unknown	November 11, 1955
47	8	"The False Witness Case"	Thomas Carr	DeVallon Scott	November 18, 1955
48	9	"The Yeager Case"	Unknown	Unknown	November 25, 1955
49	10	"The Dennis Case"	Unknown	Unknown	December 2, 1955
50	11	"The Bloody Auto Case"	Unknown	Unknown	December 9, 1955
51	12	"The Franklin Case"	Unknown	Unknown	December 16, 1955
52	13	"The Boosting Case"	Unknown	Unknown	December 23, 1955
53	14	"The Radio Case"	Unknown	Unknown	December 30, 1955
54	15	"The Del Mar Case"	Unknown	Unknown	January 6, 1956
55	16	"The Palko Case"	Felix Feist	Ellis Marcus	January 13, 1956
56	17	"The Rosemary Conway Case"	Unknown	Unknown	January 20, 1956
57	18	"The Willie Martin Case"	Hollingsworth Morse	Fred Eggers	January 27, 1956
58	19	"The Fencing Case"	Harold D. Schuster	Ellis Marcus	February 3, 1956
59	20	"The Abel Case"	Hollingsworth Morse	Sidney Marshall	February 10, 1956
60	21	"The Barker Case"	Unknown	Fred Eggers	February 17, 1956
61	22	"The Johnston Case"	Unknown	Ellis Marcus	February 24, 1956
62	23	"The Marston Case"	Unknown	Unknown	March 2, 1956
63	24	"The Baker Case"	TBD	TBD	1956
64	25	"The Design Case"	Unknown	Montgomery Pittman	March 16, 1956
65	26	"The White Case"	Unknown	Unknown	March 23, 1956
66	27	"The Deadwood Case"	Hollingsworth Morse	Fred Eggers	March 30, 1956
67	28	"The Julian Case"	Unknown	Unknown	April 6, 1956
68	29	"The Rodriguez Case"	Unknown	Unknown	April 13, 1956
69	30	"The Dayton Case"	Harold D. Shuster	Unknown	April 20, 1956
70	31	"The Charley Case"	Unknown	Sidney Marshall	April 27, 1956
71	32	"The Telephone Case"	Harold Shuster	Ellis Marcus	May 4, 1956
72	33	"The Harlan Case"	Hollingsworth Morse	Montgomery Pittman	May 11, 1956
73	34	"The Wharton Case"	Harold D. Schuster	Fred Eggers	May 18, 1956
74	35	"The Delaney Case"	Unknown	Fred Eggers	May 25, 1956
75	36	"The Dogdon Case"	Unknown	Unknown	June 1, 1956
76	37	"The Bombing Case"	Unknown	Unknown	June 8, 1956
77	38	"The Spencer Case"	Harold Shuster	Story by : Ellis Marcus; Teleplay by : Fred Eggers	June 15, 1956
78	39	"The Easy Case"	Unknown	Unknown	June 22, 1956

=== Season 3: 1956–57 ===
No. overall	No. in season	Title	Directed by	Written by	Original release date
79	1	"The Adams Case"	Hollingsworth Morse	Lawrence Resner	September 28, 1956
80	2	"The Fisherman's Wharf Case"	Harold D. Schuster	Lawrence Resner	October 5, 1956
81	3	"The Ringing Bells Case"	Unknown	Joseph Calvelli	October 12, 1956
82	4	"The Sorenson Case"	Unknown	E. Jack Neuman	October 19, 1956
83	5	"The Motorcycle Case"	Harold D. Shuster	Lawrence Resner	October 26, 1956
84	6	"The Julius Caesar Case"	Unknown	Leonard Lee	November 2, 1956
85	7	"The Crazy Killer Case"	Harold D. Shuster	Norman Jacob	November 9, 1956
86	8	"The Cosmopolitan Bunco Case"	Hollingsworth Morse	Joseph Calvelli	November 16, 1956
87	9	"The Madcap McGee Case"	Unknown	Unknown	November 23, 1956
88	10	"The Paper Millionaire Case"	Hollingsworth Morse	Fred Eggers	November 30, 1956
89	11	"The Rancho Cordova Case"	Unknown	Unknown	December 7, 1956
90	12	"The James Sunday Case"	Unknown	Unknown	December 14, 1956
91	13	"The Adam Condon Case"	Unknown	Unknown	December 28, 1956
92	14	"The Chinese Teapot Case"	Unknown	Joseph Calvelli	January 4, 1957
93	15	"The Toy Tiger Case"	Unknown	Lawrence Resner	January 11, 1957
94	16	"The Ellis Garden Case"	Unknown	Fred Eggers	January 18, 1957
95	17	"The Missing Limousine Case"	Unknown	William Spier	January 25, 1957
96	18	"The Juke Box Bandit Case"	Hollingsworth Morse	Jerry Aldeman	February 1, 1957
97	19	"The Armored Car Case"	Unknown	Lou Morheim	February 8, 1957
98	20	"The Robert Ericson Case"	Unknown	Unknown	February 15, 1957
99	21	"The Bay Meadows Case"	Unknown	Unknown	February 22, 1957
100	22	"The Walking Dead Man Case"	Unknown	Unknown	March 1, 1957
101	23	"The Heinrich Menzel Case"	Unknown	Fred Eggers	March 8, 1957
102	24	"The Charlene Bleak Murder Case"	Unknown	Unknown	March 15, 1957
103	25	"The Cherokee Rose Case"	Unknown	Unknown	March 22, 1957
104	26	"The Question Mark Case"	Unknown	Unknown	March 29, 1957
105	27	"The Sailor's Wife Case"	Unknown	Unknown	April 5, 1957
106	28	"The Georgie Gillette Case"	Unknown	Fred Eggers	April 12, 1957
107	29	"The Robert Avery Case"	Hollingsworth Morse	Fred Eggers	April 26, 1957
108	30	"The Ambitious Peddler Case"	Unknown	Unknown	May 3, 1957
109	31	"The Transom Burglar Case"	Unknown	Unknown	May 10, 1957
110	32	"The Goode Case"	Unknown	Unknown	May 17, 1957
111	33	"The Stanley Devlin Case"	James V. Kern	Fred Eggers	May 24, 1957
112	34	"The Unwelcome Visitor Case"	Unknown	Unknown	May 31, 1957
113	35	"The Alfred Morgan Case"	Unknown	Unknown	June 21, 1957

=== Season 4: 1957–58 ===
No. overall	No. in season	Title	Directed by	Written by	Original release date
114	1	"The Fleet Queen Case"	Andrew V. McLaglen	Joseph Calvelli	September 27, 1957
115	2	"The Security Officer Case"	Unknown	Unknown	October 4, 1957
116	3	"The Honolulu Treasure Case"	Unknown	Unknown	October 11, 1957
117	4	"The Phoney Witness Case"	Unknown	Unknown	October 18, 1957
118	5	"The Missing Crime Case"	Andrew V. McLaglen	Arthur Orloff	October 25, 1957
119	6	"The Circus Malone Case"	Unknown	Unknown	November 1, 1957
120	7	"The 17643 Case"	Andrew V. McLaglen	Unknown	November 8, 1957
121	8	"The Harger Jameson Case"	Unknown	Unknown	November 15, 1957
122	9	"The Phantom Robber Case"	Unknown	Unknown	November 22, 1957
123	10	"The Reluctant Addict Case"	Unknown	Unknown	November 29, 1957
124	11	"The Missing Russian Hill Matron Case"	Andrew V. McLaglen	Lawrence Resner	December 6, 1957
125	12	"The Vacationing Escapee Case"	Unknown	Unknown	December 13, 1957
126	13	"The Happy Janitor Case"	Andrew V. McLaglen	Unknown	December 20, 1957
127	14	"The Cut-up Cone-on Case"	Unknown	Norman Jacob	December 27, 1957
128	15	"The Donald Damen Case"	Unknown	Unknown	January 3, 1958
129	16	"The Willard Peabody Case"	Unknown	Unknown	January 10, 1958
130	17	"The Ash Blonde Model Case"	Unknown	Unknown	January 17, 1958
131	18	"The Hot Shot Robbery Case"	Seymour Berns	Unknown	January 24, 1958
132	19	"The Fire Bug Case"	Unknown	Unknown	January 31, 1958
133	20	"The Samuel Bradford Case"	Unknown	Unknown	February 7, 1958
134	21	"The Pawn Ticket Case"	Unknown	Unknown	February 14, 1958
135	22	"The Jealous Mambo Dancer Case"	Unknown	Unknown	February 21, 1958
136	23	"The Scott Franklin Case"	Unknown	Unknown	February 28, 1958
137	24	"The Louie Lawrence Case"	Unknown	Unknown	March 7, 1958
138	25	"The George Case"	Unknown	Unknown	March 14, 1958
139	26	"The Clarence Culver Case"	Unknown	Unknown	March 21, 1958
140	27	"The Little Hero Case"	Andrew V. McLaglen	Unknown	March 28, 1958
141	28	"The Slowboat Murphy Case"	Unknown	Unknown	April 11, 1958
142	29	"The Deacon Whitehall Case"	Unknown	Unknown	April 18, 1958
143	30	"The Missing Scientist Case"	Unknown	Unknown	May 2, 1958
144	31	"The High Fashion Case"	Seymour Burns	Paul Franklin	May 9, 1958
145	32	"The Dr. George Jeremy Case"	Unknown	Fred Eggers	May 16, 1958
146	33	"The Samson Magill Case"	Unknown	Unknown	May 23, 1958
147	34	"The G.I. Shoe Case"	Unknown	Unknown	June 6, 1958
148	35	"The Glorietta Shakedown Case"	Harold Shuster	Lawrence Resner	June 20, 1958

=== Season 5: 1958–59 ===
No. overall	No. in season	Title	Directed by	Written by	Original release date
149	1	"The Samuel McCutcheon Case"	Hollingsworth Morse	Unknown	September 26, 1958
150	2	"The Big Score Case"	Unknown	Lawrence Resner	October 3, 1958
151	3	"The Rufus Granger Case"	Unknown	Unknown	October 10, 1958
152	4	"The Missing Cargo Case"	Unknown	Unknown	October 17, 1958
153	5	"The Sarge Caldwell Case"	Unknown	Unknown	October 24, 1958
154	6	"The Professional Guest Case"	Harold D. Schuster	Joseph Calvelli	October 31, 1958
155	7	"The Chick Madison Case"	Unknown	Unknown	November 7, 1958
156	8	"The Prester John Case"	Unknown	Unknown	November 14, 1958
157	9	"The Vanishing Writer Case"	Unknown	Unknown	November 21, 1958
158	10	"The Winners Takes Nothing Case"	Unknown	Unknown	November 28, 1958
159	11	"The Scotty Waterford Case"	Unknown	Unknown	December 5, 1958
160	12	"The Grady Gremlin Case"	Hollingsworth Morse	Fred Eggers	December 12, 1958
161	13	"The Girl Bandit"	Unknown	Unknown	December 19, 1958
162	14	"The Veiled Lady Case"	Unknown	Unknown	December 26, 1958
163	15	"The Rorschach Murder Case"	Unknown	Unknown	January 2, 1959
164	16	"The Frederick Freemont Case"	Unknown	Unknown	January 9, 1959
165	17	"The Final Punch Case"	Unknown	Unknown	January 16, 1959
166	18	"The Boylston Billing Case"	Unknown	Unknown	January 23, 1959
167	19	"The Corny Cassidy Case"	Unknown	Unknown	January 30, 1959
168	20	"The Hamilton Harker Case"	Unknown	Unknown	February 6, 1959
169	21	"The Charles Cleveland Case"	Hollingsworth Morse	Unknown	February 13, 1959
170	22	"The Waterfront Romeo Case"	Unknown	Unknown	February 20, 1959
171	23	"The Pigeon Drop Case"	Unknown	Unknown	February 27, 1959
172	24	"The Garmen Millingham Case"	Unknown	Fred Eggers	March 6, 1959
173	25	"The Big Dan McGran Case"	Unknown	Unknown	March 13, 1959
174	26	"The D.B.V. Cuddington Case"	Unknown	Unknown	March 20, 1959
175	27	"The Trap Door Spider Case"	Unknown	Unknown	March 27, 1959
176	28	"The Girls and Guns Case"	James V. Kern	John Taylor	April 3, 1959
177	29	"The Walking Firefly Case"	Unknown	Unknown	April 10, 1959
178	30	"The Changeable Blonde Case"	Unknown	Unknown	April 17, 1959
179	31	"The Chain Store Robbery Case"	Unknown	Unknown	May 1, 1959
180	32	"The Murdered Blonde Case"	Unknown	Unknown	May 8, 1959
181	33	"The Drugstore Cowgirl Case"	Unknown	Unknown	May 15, 1959
182	34	"The Chloroform Murder Case"	Unknown	Unknown	May 22, 1959
183	35	"The Daniel Leadley Case"	Unknown	Unknown	May 29, 1959

=== Season 6: 1959–60 ===
No. overall	No. in season	Title	Directed by	Written by	Original release date
184	1	"Wake Up To Terror"	Jesse Hibbs	Jack Laird	September 30, 1959
185	2	"The Strange Return Of Army Armitage"	Unknown	Unknown	October 7, 1959
186	3	"My Son Is A Stranger"	Unknown	Unknown	October 14, 1959
187	4	"The Death Of A Puppet"	Paul Henreid	Joseph Calvelli and Mel Goldberg	October 21, 1959
188	5	"Edge Of Disaster"	Unknown	Unknown	October 28, 1959
189	6	"Prelude to Violence"	Unknown	Unknown	November 4, 1959
190	7	"Run to the City"	Stuart Rosenberg	William Driskill	November 11, 1959
191	8	"Lonesome as Midnight"	Paul Henreid	Ken Kolb	November 18, 1959
192	9	"The Counterfeit Citizens"	Unknown	Unknown	December 2, 1959
193	10	"The Chinatown Story"	Unknown	Unknown	December 9, 1959
194	11	"The Vengeful Knife"	Unknown	Unknown	December 16, 1959
195	12	"Peg Leg's Wife Case"	Unknown	Unknown	December 23, 1959
196	13	"Prince of Penmen"	Paul Henreid	Robert Bloomfield	December 30, 1959
197	14	"Woman on the Ledge"	Unknown	Unknown	January 13, 1960
198	15	"Seven Sinners"	Unknown	Unknown	January 20, 1960
199	16	"The Rosaric Case"	Unknown	Unknown	January 27, 1960
200	17	"The Deadly Romeo Case"	TBD	TBD	1960
201	18	"The King Con Case"	TBD	TBD	1960

== Guest stars ==
- Russ Conway appeared in "The Robert Avery Case" (1957) and "The Missing Cargo Case" (1958).
- Walter Coy appeared in "The Murdered Blonde Case" (May 8, 1959).
- Ron Hagerthy appeared in "The Toy Tiger Case" and then as John Oakhurst in "The Security Officer Case" (1957).
- Rodolfo Hoyos Jr. guest-starred as Luis Gonzalez in "The Reluctant Addict Case" (1957).
- Douglas Kennedy appeared in "The Charles Cleveland Case" (1959) and "The Drugstore Cowgirl Case" (1959).
- Joyce Meadows appeared as Paula Adams in "The Boylston Billing Case" (1959).
- Eve Miller appeared in "The Christmas Story" (1954), "The Stanley Devlin Case" (1957) and "The Daniel Leadley Case" (1959).
- Nan Leslie was cast three times, in "The Chick Madison Case" (1958) and "The Pigeon Drop Case" and "The Girls and Guns Case" (both 1959).
- Donna Martell guest-starred in "Girl Safecrackers" (1955) and "The Pawn Ticket Case" (1958).

== Production ==
Producer Jaime del Valle began in March each year to work on the next season. Each episode was based on files from the San Francisco police, "dramatized but authentic". San Francisco Police Inspector John Kane worked with del Valle to review police records and select cases to be developed into 39 episodes for the coming broadcast year. Six salaried writers produced rough drafts of scripts for del Valle to review and annotate for changes. Del Valle said that scripts were assigned according to writers' strengths: "One writer may be good on crimes of violence while another may do mostly the psychological sort of thing." Exterior scenes were filmed on location in San Francisco. Interior scenes were done at RKO-Pathe Studios in Hollywood.

== Film version ==
The film The Lineup, based on the series, was released in 1958 by Columbia Pictures, with Eli Wallach in the starring role. It was directed by Don Siegel, who had also directed "The Paisley Gang", the pilot episode of the television series. Warner Anderson and Marshall Reed reprised their roles for the film.
