= Steve Weston =

Canadian actor (1940–1985)

Steve Weston (1940 – May 12, 1985) was a Canadian television and theatre actor. He is best known to Canadian audiences from his stint as the husband in the sitcom The Trouble With Tracy, and as a series regular on the sketch comedy series Bizarre. However, he was also an accomplished stage actor and once played the role of Gooper Pollitt in a Toronto production of Cat on a Hot Tin Roof. Also appeared on the short lived CBLT TV (Toronto Comedy) Sunday Morning with a cast that included Rosemary Radcliffe.

At the time of his death, Weston was the on-screen daytime continuity announcer at CHCH-TV and was well known for making improvised comments about the developments in the soap operas that were airing on the station.

Weston's death was the result of a fall from a roof. He had been suffering from a pancreatic disorder that caused him to experience hallucinations.
