= Sylvia Lennick =

Canadian actress

- Born: Sylvia Bela Paige; November 14, 1915; Toronto, Ontario, Canada
- Died: August 10, 2009 (aged 93); Toronto, Ontario, Canada

Sylvia Bela Lennick (née Paige; November 14, 1915 – August 10, 2009) was a Canadian comedic actress. A supporting cast member of Wayne & Shuster's television comedy troupe, she was most famous for her role as Calpurnia, with the famous catch phrase "I told him, Julie! Don't go!", in the Shakespearean parody "Rinse the Blood Off My Toga".

In addition to her work with Wayne and Shuster, Lennick was a semi-regular on many of the CBC's weekly television series in the 1950s, including Cannonball and Tugboat Annie, as well as numerous comedy, drama and musical specials throughout the 1950s, 60s and 70s, and also played Mrs. Sherwood in the 1970-71 sitcom The Trouble with Tracy. She had supporting roles in film and television in her later years, including the Disney Channel television film Get a Clue and the horror film Visiting Hours.

== Life and career ==
She spent much of her life married to her Wayne & Shuster castmate Ben Lennick. They had three children: Michael, a television producer, Julie, an actress who performs regularly with the Toronto Civic Light-Opera Co., and David, a radio host. The Lennicks were Jewish, and the scheduling of the troupe's breakthrough appearance on The Ed Sullivan Show forced the Lennicks to postpone David's bar mitzvah.

Sylvia and Ben met in the early days of World War II as members of the Toronto left-of-center Theatre of Action. Together and separately they won many awards for their work in theatre, radio and the early days of Canadian television, most notably on the CBC. They were among the founding members of what eventually became the Canadian actors' performing union, ACTRA.

In the 1940s Ben and Sylvia teamed with others to form their own Toronto stage company. A decision to keep the marquee on the theatre they rented to save money gave the production company its name, Belmont Theatre Productions.

In the 1950s, Sylvia and Ben Lennick starred in the CBC Radio series At Home with the Lennicks.

In the early 1960s Ben and Sylvia, along with partner Jack Merigold, revived Belmont Theatre Productions and produced several seasons of well-received dramas, comedies and musicals. In the mid-1970s Ben and Sylvia, along with Jack Merigold and new cast member Allan Price, took the concept one crucial step further with the creation of their new company Theatre in the Home, bringing professional theatre productions to shut-ins in retirement communities and private residences.

In 1983, Lennick and Jan Rubeš appeared as Fräulein Schneider and Herr Schultz in a Toronto production of Cabaret.

In a 2008 interview with the Toronto Star to mark the 50th anniversary of the Wayne & Shuster troupe's historic performance on The Ed Sullivan Show, Lennick stated that when she first read the script, she hadn't thought that "I told him, Julie! Don't go!" would be the sketch's biggest laugh line: "I thought I was going to kill them when I said, `It's the Ides of March, already.'"

== Death ==
Lennick died on August 10, 2009, at Toronto's Sunnybrook Health Sciences Centre of complications from pneumonia, aged 93.
