= Seymour Berns =

American television producer and director

- Born: May 30, 1919; Chicago, Illinois, U.S.
- Died: May 16, 1982 (aged 62); Los Angeles, California, U.S.
- Education: University of California, Los Angeles (BA)
- Occupations: Television producer; television director; television executive
- Notable work: The Jack Benny Program; The Red Skelton Hour; The Trouble with Tracy
- Spouse: Ann Berns
- Children: 1

Seymour Berns (May 30, 1919 – May 16, 1982) was an American television producer, director and executive. His credits included The Jack Benny Program, The Red Skelton Show, The Red Skelton Hour and the Canadian sitcom The Trouble with Tracy. He received five Primetime Emmy Award nominations between 1959 and 1970.

== Early life and education ==
Berns was born in Chicago, Illinois, on May 30, 1919. He moved to California in 1935 and graduated from the University of California, Los Angeles in 1942.

== Career ==
Berns began his broadcasting career at CBS, where he worked as an usher before moving into radio production and directing. During the 1940s and 1950s, his credits included Hollywood Barn Dance, Melodies America Loves, House Party with Art Linkletter, Double or Nothing, Tricks and Treats, Hollywood Opportunity, Hollywood House, Dead Letter Office, Premium Quiz and Free for All.

By the late 1950s, Berns was directing and producing The Jack Benny Program. He directed the 1959 episode "Airport Sketch" and produced and directed the 1959 episode "Jack Paar Show". He received a Primetime Emmy Award nomination in 1959 for Best Direction of a Single Program of a Comedy Series for The Jack Benny Show.

Berns produced and directed The Red Skelton Show and The Red Skelton Hour. He received Emmy nominations for his work on the programs in 1962, 1963 and 1966.

In 1969, Berns was responsible for the television output of National General Television Productions, having spent much of his career as a producer-director for CBS. While at National General, he produced and directed The Trouble with Tracy, a Canadian sitcom made for CTV. Originally piloted as The Married Youngs, the series was renamed by Berns after his daughter Tracy.

Berns later served as production vice president of Columbia Pictures Television. He joined PolyGram Television in 1980 and was its vice president of production and development at the time of his death.

Berns was president of the National Academy of Television Arts and Sciences in 1969.

== Personal life and death ==
Berns was married to Ann Berns. They had a daughter, Tracy, for whom The Trouble with Tracy was named.

Berns died of cancer on May 16, 1982, at Cedars-Sinai Hospital in Los Angeles.

== Awards and nominations ==
The Television Academy lists Berns as receiving five Primetime Emmy Award nominations:

Year	Award	Work	Result
1959	Best Direction of a Single Program of a Comedy Series	The Jack Benny Show	Nominated
1962	Outstanding Directorial Achievement in Comedy	The Red Skelton Show	Nominated
1963	Outstanding Directorial Achievement in Comedy	The Red Skelton Hour	Nominated
1966	Outstanding Variety Series	The Red Skelton Hour (Berns was producer)	Nominated
1970	Outstanding Directing for a Comedy Series	The Second Bill Cosby Special	Nominated
