= Frank Shuster =

Canadian comedian (1916–2002)

Frank Shuster OC
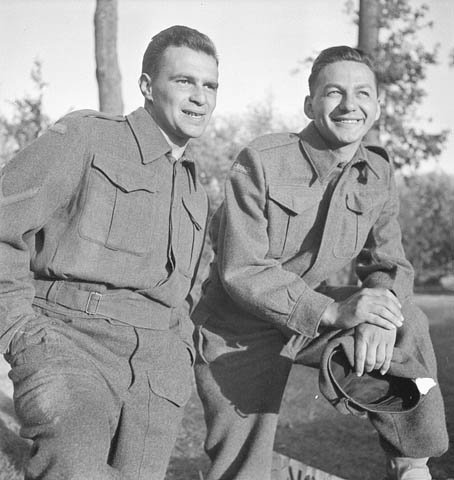
- Johnny Wayne (left) and Frank Shuster (right)
- Born: September 5, 1916; Toronto, Ontario
- Died: January 13, 2002 (aged 85); Toronto, Ontario
- Resting place: Holy Blossom Memorial Park, Toronto
- Education: University of Toronto
- Occupation: Comedian
- Spouse: Ruth Shuster (née Burstyn)
- Children: Rosie Shuster and Steve Shuster
- Relatives: Joe Shuster (cousin)
- Awards: Order of Canada
- Military career
- Allegiance: Canada
- Branch: Canadian Army
- Service years: 1942–1946
- Rank: Sergeant
- Conflicts: World War II

Frank Shuster, OC (September 5, 1916 – January 13, 2002) was a Canadian comedian best known as a member of the comedy duo Wayne and Shuster, alongside Johnny Wayne. Wayne played to Shuster's straight man.

== Early life ==
Shuster was born to a Jewish immigrant family in Toronto, Ontario, and spent part of his childhood in Niagara Falls. Shuster was originally Shusterovich. His family returned to Toronto in the college/Spadina area, in time for Shuster to attend high school at Toronto's Harbord Collegiate Institute, where he met Johnny Wayne in 1930.

The two would soon be performing sketches and routines at school talent shows, continuing to do the same when they both attended the University of Toronto, majoring in English literature. Starting with entertaining scouts, he and Shuster wrote some original scores and performed at the university's Hart House Follies.

== Professional career ==
By the early 1940s Wayne and Shuster began appearing on local radio station CFRB, and during World War II they joined the Canadian Army as performers, entertaining Canadian troops, and performed on the CBC Radio series The Army Show.

After the war, the duo appeared on CBC radio and television, becoming a network fixture with regular appearances from the 1940s through the 1980s.

In 1951 the Shusters were able to move a custom designed home designed by Ruth's architect brother Harry Bursten on Ridelle Avenue in the well to do Forest Hill neighbourhood of Toronto where they lived for the next 19 years. He and Wayne, who lived only a few doors away, would often work together on scripts in Shuster's 2nd floor study.

They appeared on The Ed Sullivan Show 66 times. The duo would remain a comedy team for 50 years, until Wayne's death in 1990.

In 1996, Shuster was made an Officer of the Order of Canada.

== Later life ==
Shuster was married to Ruth Shuster c. 1943, and had two children, Rosie and Steve. Rosie Shuster (b. 1946) was a comedy writer for Saturday Night Live and other television programs, and former wife of Lorne Michaels. Steve Shuster, a standup comic, writer, musician, and actor, died in 2017 at the age of 67.

He was also the cousin of Joe Shuster, co-creator of Superman.

Shuster died on January 13, 2002, in Toronto, Ontario, at the age of 85.
