= Wayne and Shuster =

Canadian comedy duo

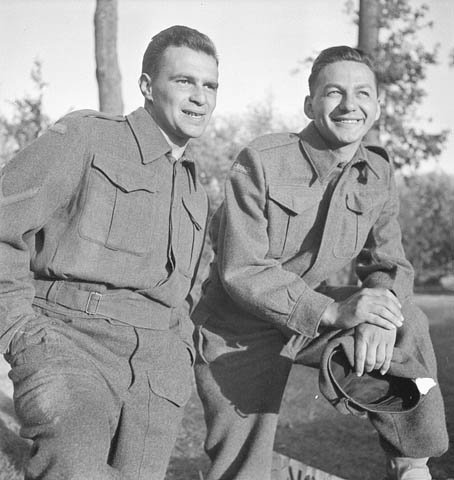
- Wayne (left) and Shuster (right) before a performance in France, 1944
- Education: University of Toronto
- Notable work: "Rinse the Blood Off My Toga"; "A Shakespearean Baseball Game"

Comedy career
- Years active: 1941–1990
- Medium: Television; radio; stage
- Genre: Comedy
- Former members: Johnny Wayne; Frank Shuster

Wayne and Shuster were a Canadian comedy duo formed by Johnny Wayne and Frank Shuster. They were active professionally from the early 1940s until Wayne's death in 1990, first as a live act, then on radio, then as part of The Army Show, which entertained troops in Europe during World War II, and later on both Canadian and American television.

Wayne (born Louis Weingarten; May 28, 1918 – July 18, 1990) and Shuster (September 5, 1916 – January 13, 2002) were well known in Canada and became Ed Sullivan's most frequently recurring guests, appearing a record 67 times on his show. Despite repeated suggestions that they should move to the United States to further their careers, the duo chose to remain based in Canada.

== Beginnings ==
Wayne and Shuster were born in the same neighbourhood in Toronto, Ontario, Canada, and met in grade school. In 1931, while students at Harbord Collegiate Institute, they performed their first skit together for their Boy Scout troop, and, as part of the school drama club, continued to entertain fellow students. They both studied at the University of Toronto, where they wrote and performed as "Shuster and Wayne".

== Radio ==
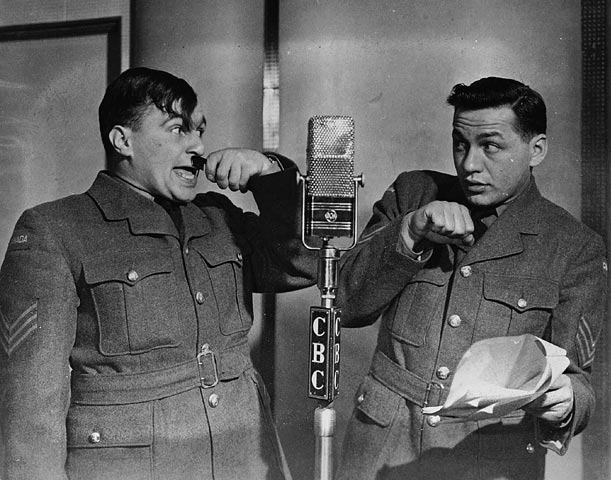
Performing for The Army Show on CBC Radio during World War II

In 1941, they made their radio debut on CFRB in their own show, The Javex Wife Preservers, for which they were each paid $12.50 per week to dispense household hints in a humorous fashion. Their popularity on CFRB, then a top-rated Toronto radio station, soon landed the pair on the Canadian Broadcasting Corporation's (CBC) Trans-Canada Network as part of the Buckingham Cigarette Blended Rhythm Show.

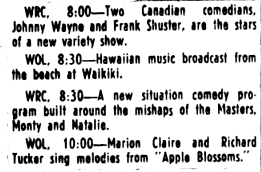
Listing for the pair's new comedy/variety radio show, airing in the US in 1947.

They enlisted in the Canadian Army in 1942 and were immediately assigned to The Canadian Army Radio Show, which was produced in Montreal. Shuster and Wayne wrote most of the music, lyrics and skits, and were part of a cast that featured singers Jimmie Shields and Raymonde Maranda. The radio show was a success, resulting in The Army Show, a touring stage version that opened in Toronto in April 1943 to popular acclaim. Time called it "a high-spirited, always likeable, often lavish soldier show", noting that two Toronto sergeants, Frank Shuster and Johnny Wayne, had written the book, songs and lyrics.

The revue travelled across Canada in 1943 to entertain troops and help with the sale of Victory Bonds, and included a stop at the Quebec Conference. In addition to Shuster and Wayne, the cast included singer Roger Doucet, Brian and Dennis Farnon, Denny Vaughan, and Lois Hooker, who later, as Lois Maxwell, played Miss Moneypenny in fourteen James Bond films. In late 1943, the revue was split into five units and sent to England to entertain troops. Shuster and Wayne again prepared most of the material for all the units, and were assigned to a unit that followed Canadian troops into France after D-Day. The duo often performed close enough to the front lines that they had to contend with snipers, strafing and a relatively close encounter with an exploding V-1 "buzz bomb".

After demobilization, Shuster and Wayne returned to Toronto and started The RCA Victor Show on CBC Radio. An advertising executive suggested that "Wayne & Shuster" sounded better than "Shuster & Wayne". Since the order of their names was not important to the two, they agreed to the change. Alex Barris later recalled that they had a CBC office with two doors: one read "Wayne & Shuster", the other "Shuster & Wayne". Their popularity rapidly grew, and CBC changed the name of their radio program to The Wayne & Shuster Show. By 1950, their Canadian weekly audience numbered 3 million. They also began to make a name for themselves in the United States when they were hired to make a radio network series to replace William Bendix's The Life of Riley while it was on summer hiatus in 1947.

== Television ==
Wayne and Shuster first appeared on television in 1950, but not in Canada, which did not have network television until 1952. Their radio sponsor, Toni Home Permanent, also sponsored the American television show Toni Twin Time, hosted by Jack Lemmon. The sponsor asked the duo to make regular appearances on the program, which was not doing well. After two shows, a sponsor executive asked them to take over the hosting duties from Lemmon, who was young, inexperienced and visibly nervous. Wayne and Shuster, however, were unsure about the new medium of television and turned down the offer.

In 1952, CBC producer Mavor Moore approached them about doing a regular live comedy show on the new CBC Television network. After watching Milton Berle deal with lighting, sound, music and audience demands while broadcasting live from New York City, the two were still concerned about the demands of live television. They agreed to make one CBC television appearance in Montreal in 1952, but turned down the opportunity to produce a regular show in Toronto. Wayne said, "You guys don't know anything about television. We don't either. Why don't we wait until we both know something about it?"

Two years later, in 1954, they agreed to host a regular comedy show on CBC. In 1955, on one of their shows, they presented a Shakespearean spoof called "Rinse the Blood Off My Toga", which they also presented on British television the same year. A literary mashup of William Shakespeare and Mickey Spillane, the sketch features a hard-boiled Roman private investigator hired by Brutus to investigate the murder of Julius Caesar on the Ides of March. As with many of their scripts, "Rinse the Blood Off My Toga" assumed the audience had a working knowledge of history, Shakespeare and sometimes even Latin.

In 1958, in response to the opening of the Stratford Festival in Stratford, Ontario, they created "A Shakespearean Baseball Game", written in iambic pentameter and rhyming couplets, and featuring lines lifted from Hamlet and Macbeth. In later years, they considered this their favourite script. The Canadian Communications Foundation later cited both "Rinse the Blood Off My Toga" and the Shakespearean baseball sketch among their most famous sketches.

Lorraine Thomson, who often appeared on their live broadcasts in the 1950s, called their writing "a kind of cross between a more erudite British sense of humour and the more American vaudevillian sense of humour", and said that they treated their audiences with respect.

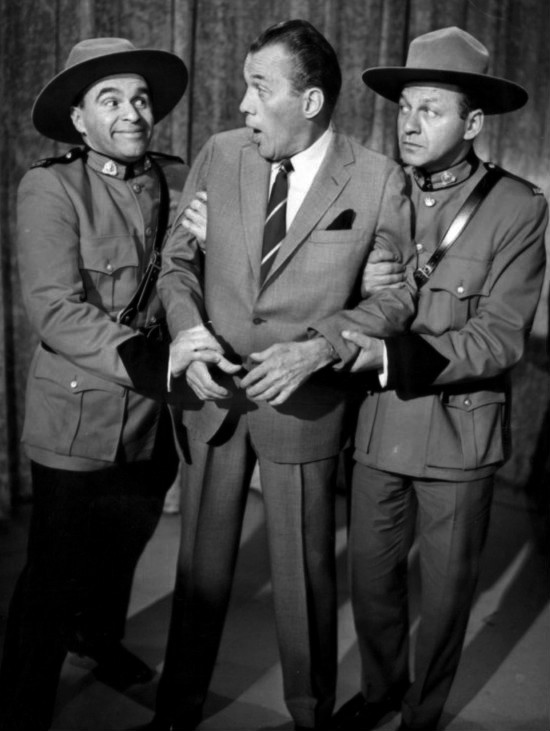
The Mounties get their man when Ed Sullivan brought his show to Toronto in 1963.

In 1958, they signed a one-year contract with Ed Sullivan to appear regularly on The Ed Sullivan Show for $7,500 a show. The agreement included a handshake understanding that Sullivan would not cut or edit their sketches, which tended to run 12 minutes or longer. Their first sketch for Sullivan was a 14-minute version of "Rinse the Blood Off My Toga", which they had previously done for CBC and British television. Singer Eartha Kitt once asked Frank Shuster, "What have you got on Ed Sullivan?", after Sullivan cut one of her songs from a program but left Wayne and Shuster's 12-minute sketch intact. The only time Sullivan asked for an edit was to remove a joke about Southern lynchings, because he was worried about offending network stations in the Southern United States. Sullivan loved the Canadian duo and repeatedly renewed their contract; they appeared on The Ed Sullivan Show a record 67 times over the next 11 years. Frank Shuster later disputed this count, telling television critic Jim Bawden, "We were on Ed 58 times. The record books say 67, but that's wrong."

Ed Sullivan advised the two, despite their success in the United States, to remain in Toronto. They took his advice and turned down many offers to move to the United States permanently. In later years, Shuster often told the story of one agent who tried to get them to move to Hollywood, insisting, "You know, Frank, there's more to life than happiness."

In 1962, and again in 1963, they were ranked as the best comedy routine in America by Motion Picture Daily and Television Today. They also co-starred in the CBS sitcom Holiday Lodge, which aired as a summer replacement for, and was produced by, Jack Benny in 1961.

In 1964, Wayne and Shuster created a series of six short documentaries for CBC Television, later presented on CBS during the 1966 summer season, about comedians such as W. C. Fields and the Marx Brothers. With music scored by John Williams, the series was titled Wayne & Shuster Take an Affectionate Look at.... They made another six episodes the following year. In 1965, The Wayne & Shuster Hour won the Silver Rose at the Rose d'Or Television Festival.

In 1962 and again in 1965, the pair went to Britain and produced Wayne and Shuster specials for the BBC.

In the 1960s, they moved from a weekly television show to monthly Wayne & Shuster comedy specials on CBC Television. By the 1970s, they were producing three to four comedy specials per year, which often drew Canadian television ratings of more than two million viewers.

Wayne and Shuster's skits often employed large casts of characters. Supporting players included Canadian actors Don Cullen, Jack Duffy, Tom Harvey, Bill Kemp, Paul Kligman, Ben Lennick, Sylvia Lennick, Pegi Loder, Les Rubie, Eric Christmas, Joe Austin, Larry Mann, Paul Soles, Marilyn Stuart, Roy Wordsworth, John Davies, Carol Robinson, Lou Pitoscia, Peggy Mahon, Don Ewer, Howard Swinson and Keith Hampshire. For many years, their music director was Canadian jazz artist Norman Amadio.

Wayne and Shuster were infamous for their vociferous arguments during scriptwriting sessions, television production and editing sessions. Wayne in particular was exacting during production and often took the studio crew to task for perceived faults. Technicians sometimes responded by refusing to work overtime at the end of the day. During one sketch, crew members were instructed to throw fruit and vegetables at both comedians from off-camera. Instead, the crew only hurled fruit at Wayne. One floor director remembered Wayne as "two people. On the [studio] floor he was a son of a bitch, but outside he was one of the nicest guys you could meet." Despite their temperamental reputation in the studio, both were described as friendly, thoughtful and welcoming outside of work.

Because of their combative working relationship in the studio, the two agreed early on not to mix socially. Shortly after their CBC radio show became popular, Wayne told Shuster that he was organizing a party but was not going to invite his partner "because we're always together and we'll start in about the business. So, to hell with that." Shuster agreed, and from that point on they led separate lives away from work, with different interests and hobbies.

== Later career ==
By the late 1970s, critics were calling their comedy irrelevant and out of date, but their Canadian television ratings remained strong. In 1980, CBC repackaged their material into 80 half-hour specials that were syndicated worldwide.

The pair continued to produce comedy specials until Wayne's death from cancer in 1990. After Wayne's death, Shuster went back into the editing suite and, from almost 40 years of their television shows, produced a retrospective series of twenty-two shows, which he also hosted. In 1999, three years before his death, he hosted a one-hour compendium of their work, Wayne & Shuster: The First Hundred Years.

== Legacy and revivals ==
Wayne and Shuster are widely described as foundational figures in English Canadian television comedy. In 2012, a Heritage Toronto legacy plaque honouring the duo was unveiled at Harbord Collegiate Institute during the school's 120th anniversary celebrations. In 2019, a lane in the Bathurst and Harbord area of Toronto, where they grew up, was named Wayne and Shuster Lane.

In 2023, Bygone Theatre and Hart House Theatre presented Wayne & Shuster Live!, a stage production of classic Wayne and Shuster sketches directed by Paul Bates and based on original scripts by Wayne and Shuster. The production ran at Hart House Theatre from May 25 to May 27, 2023, and was developed with the involvement of the duo's descendants, Brian and Michael Wayne and Rosie Shuster. The Canadian Jewish News also reported in 2023 that Wayne and Shuster's children were helping bring the duo's classic comedy sketches to a new generation.

== Awards ==
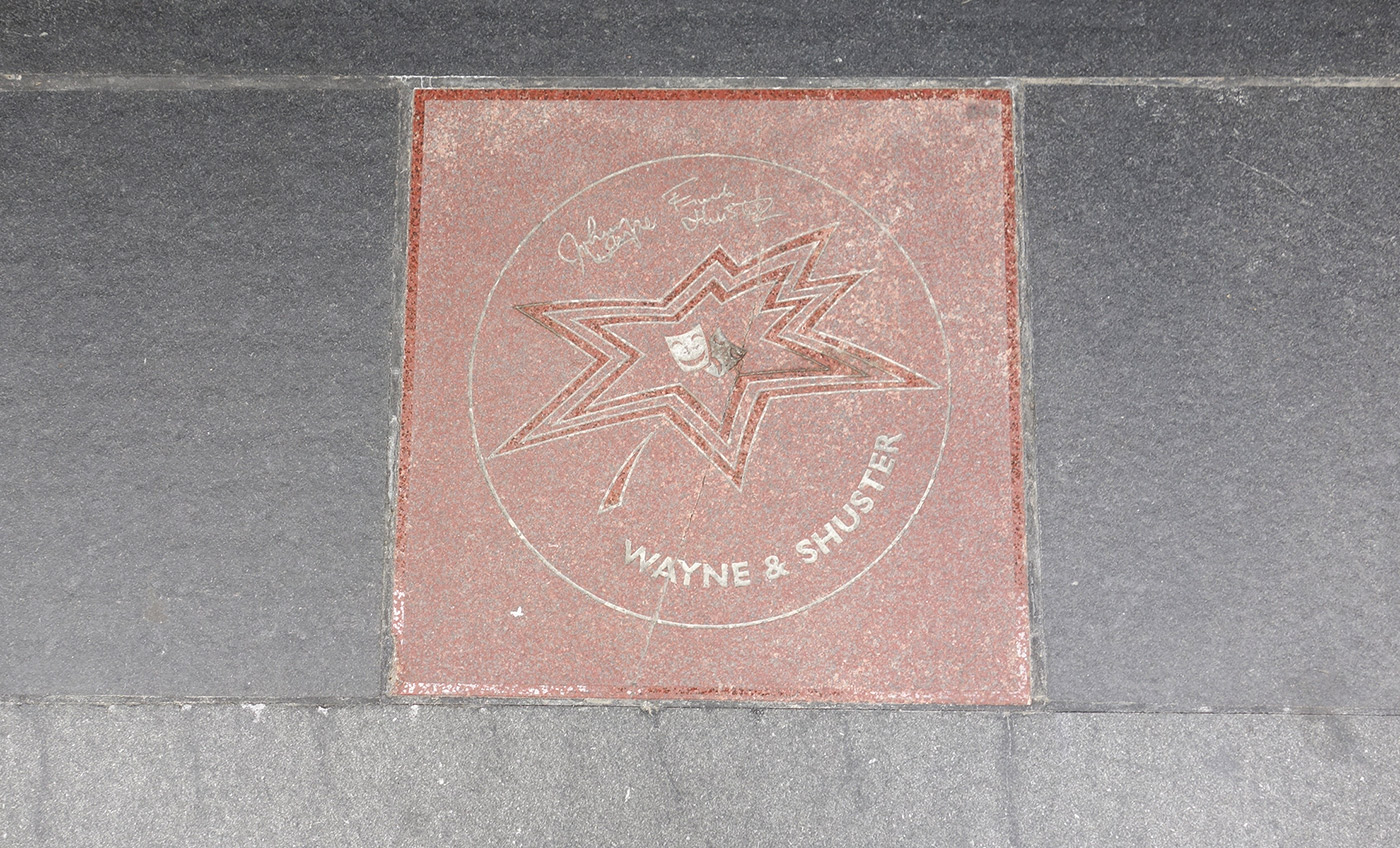
Wayne & Shuster Plate at Roy Thomson Hall

- After Wayne's death in 1990, the duo received a special Gemini Award for their outstanding contribution to Canadian television.
- In 1996, Shuster accepted the Margaret Collier Award for the duo's comedy writing.
- In 1996, Shuster was named an Officer of the Order of Canada.
- In 1999, Wayne and Shuster were inducted into Canada's Walk of Fame.
- In 2012, the duo were recognized with a Heritage Toronto plaque at their old high school, Harbord Collegiate Institute.
- In 2019, a lane in the Bathurst/Harbord area where they grew up was named Wayne and Shuster Lane.

== Other media ==
In 2000, Australian music group The Avalanches created a track called "Frontier Psychiatrist", which was built on various samples of previously recorded material, most noticeably the Wayne and Shuster sketch "Frontier Psychiatrist". Audio clips of two other Wayne and Shuster sketches were also used in creating the track, along with samples of dozens of pieces of music. "Frontier Psychiatrist" was released as a single and became a hit in the United Kingdom, reaching No. 18 on the charts. Johnny Wayne vocalizes the song's repeated refrain "that boy needs therapy"; both Wayne and Frank Shuster are the featured voices throughout verses one and two.
