= Johnny Wayne =

Canadian comedian and comedy writer (1918–1990)

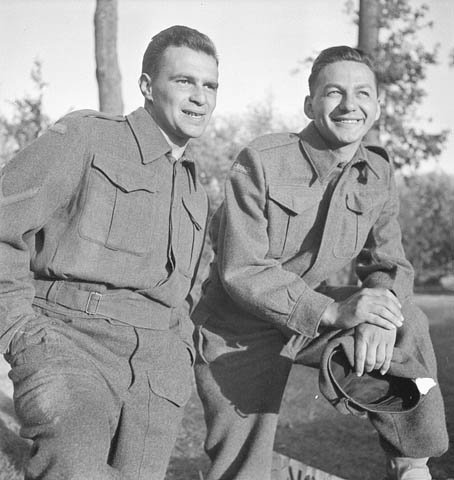
- Johnny Wayne (left) and Frank Shuster (right) in 1944
- Born: Louis Weingarten; May 28, 1918; Toronto, Ontario, Canada
- Died: July 18, 1990 (aged 72); Toronto
- Resting place: Holy Blossom Memorial Park, Toronto
- Education: University of Toronto
- Occupations: Comedian, comedy writer
- Spouse: Beatrice (1946-1980, her death)
- Children: Michael, Jamie, and Brian
- Military career
- Allegiance: Canada
- Branch: Canadian Army
- Service years: 1942–1946
- Rank: Sergeant
- Conflicts: World War II

Johnny Wayne (born Louis Weingarten, also given as John Louis Weingarten; May 28, 1918 – July 18, 1990) was a Canadian comedian and comedy writer best known for his work as part of the comedy duo Wayne and Shuster alongside Frank Shuster (1916–2002).

== Early life ==
The son of a successful clothing manufacturer who spoke several languages, Charles Bryon Weingarten and mother Sarah, and the eldest of seven children, Johnny Wayne was born in downtown Toronto, in the College/Spadina area, and attended Harbord Collegiate Institute, where he met his future comedy partner, and later attended the University of Toronto, majoring in English literature.

Starting with entertaining scouts, he and Shuster wrote some original scores and performed at the university's Hart House Follies.

== Professional life ==
Wayne and Shuster began working together in the 1930s and continued their successful collaboration on stage, radio, and television until Wayne's death. Wayne played to Shuster's straight man.

During World War II Wayne enlisted with the Canadian Army with Shuster, assigned to The Army Show (1942–1945), a troop entertainment unit like ENSA, including stage-performing soon after the Normandy landings of June 1944.

Following the war, they produced material for the Department of Veteran Affairs, before rejoining CBC Radio in 1946, producing 39 half-hour episodes a year, until 1953. Wayne with Shuster went to the new medium of television in the mid-1950s.

The duo appeared in The Ed Sullivan Show in May 1958, and were considered as Canada's comedy ambassadors, later going on to produce for the Canadian Broadcasting Corporation until 1989.

He had musical talents and was a successful songwriter in the 1950s, including co-writing Bobby Gimby's 1958 hit "Jimbo". In 1964 he recorded the song "Charlottetown", which he wrote and sang for the Canadian Confederation Centennial.

In 1999 the pair were given a star on Canada's Walk of Fame.

== Personal life and death ==
Wayne was a curling enthusiast and was a commentator alongside Alex Trebek and Doug Maxwell during the 1968 CBC Curling Championship.

He married Beatrice Lokash in 1946. They were married until her death from cancer in 1980.

They were parents to three children, one of whom is notable historian Michael Wayne.

Wayne died from brain cancer in 1990. He is buried at Holy Blossom Cemetery in his home town of Toronto.

== See also ==
- List of notable brain tumor patients
