= List of The Abbott and Costello Show episodes =

This is a list of episodes for The Abbott and Costello Show, an American syndicated television series that was broadcast for two seasons starting in 1952. A total of 52 episodes were filmed.

== Series overview ==
Season	Episodes	Originally released	
Season	Episodes	First released	Last released
1	26	September 1952	May 1953
2	26	October 1953	May 1954

== Episodes ==
=== Season 1 (1952–53) ===
No. overall	No. in season	Title	Directed by	Written by	Original release date
1	1	"The Drugstore"	Jean Yarbrough	Sidney Fields	1952
Bud and Lou find a job in Mr. Fields' brother's drugstore and wreck the place. Includes the "Jonah and the Whale" routine. First Appearances of Lou Costello, Bud Abbott, Joe Besser, Sidney Fields, Gordon "Mike The Cop" Jones, Joe "Mr. Bacciagalupe" Kirk and Hillary Brooke
2	2	"The Dentist Office"	Jean Yarbrough	Sidney Fields	1952
Lou gets a toothache and he attempts to get arrested so he can receive free treatment while incarcerated.
3	3	"Jail"	Jean Yarbrough	Eddie Forman	1952
Lou damages Mrs. Crumbcake's 79-cent water pail and she drags him into court for damages. In jail, Lou's crazed cellmate becomes enraged whenever he hears "Niagara Falls."
4	4	"The Vacation"	Jean Yarbrough	Sidney Fields	1952
Bud and Lou head to the Biltmore Hotel near Phoenix for a vacation. The "Hertz U-Drive" and the "Pack-Unpack" routines are performed.
5	5	"The Birthday Party"	Jean Yarbrough	Eddie Forman	1953
Lou throws a birthday party for himself, but nearly poisons his guests when he puts ant paste on his hors d'oeuvres instead of antipasto. Bud throws him out and Lou consoles himself by ordering a giant decorated cake from Mr. Bacciagalupe.
6	6	"Alaska"	Jean Yarbrough	Eddie Forman	1953
Lou is notified that his uncle Tom in Alaska has struck gold, so Bud and Lou plan to help him spend it.
7	7	"The Vacuum Cleaner Salesman"	Jean Yarbrough	Sidney Fields	1953
Bud and Lou visit an employment agency run by Mr. Fields' brother. Lou gets a job selling vacuum cleaners door to door.
8	8	"The Army Story"	Jean Yarbrough	Sidney Fields	1953
Bud and Lou join the Army National Guard, where they recreate their routines from the feature film Buck Privates. "7 X 13 = 28", "Drill Routine" and "Dice Game" are performed.
9	9	"Pots & Pans"	Jean Yarbrough	Sidney Fields	1953
Lou sells pots and pans door-to-door, and tries to prepare a dinner to show their quality, with disastrous results.
10	10	"The Charity Bazaar"	Jean Yarbrough	Sidney Fields	1953
Bud and Lou participate in Hillary Brooke's charity bazaar raising money with the "shell game." Lou blows his money at the kissing booth.
11	11	"The Western Story"	Jean Yarbrough	Sidney Fields	1953
Bud and Lou accept Hillary's invitation to visit her uncle's ranch in Arizona.
12	12	"The Haunted House"	Jean Yarbrough	Sidney Fields & Eddie Forman	1953
Hillary will inherit her uncle's haunted castle if she spends the night there. Bud and Lou come along to protect her.
13	13	"Peace & Quiet"	Jean Yarbrough	Eddie Forman	1953
Lou sleeps all day but can't sleep at night. Bud takes him to see a psychiatrist. Eventually Bud checks him into a sanitarium for a night's rest. "Crazy House" is performed.
14	14	"Hungry"	Jean Yarbrough	Sidney Fields	1953
Bud and Lou visit a couple of restaurants. In one they become involved with twin waitresses. In the other, Lou has a battle with an oyster. Also includes "Alexander 4444."
15	15	"The Music Lovers"	Jean Yarbrough	Sidney Fields	1953
Lou takes music lessons in order to try to impress Hillary Brooke and her father with his musical abilities. While pretending to perform, Bud falls asleep and ruins the scheme.
16	16	"The Politician"	Jean Yarbrough	Sidney Fields	1953
Lou runs for City Council, and delivers a speech in a neighborhood park that causes quite a disruption. First Appearance of Bingo The Chimp
17	17	"The Wrestling Match"	Jean Yarbrough	Sidney Fields	1953
Lou and Stinky agree to settle their differences with a wrestling match. When Stinky becomes ill, his little brother Ivan the Terrible takes his place. While Mike gets a shave, Bud and Lou borrow his uniform to get a free meal at a restaurant.
18	18	"Getting a Job"	Jean Yarbrough	Sidney Fields	1953
The "Loafing" routine is performed. Lou is hired to deliver hats to the Susquehanna Hat Company on Floogle Street and encounters several lunatics on the way. Stinky and Lou get into a hitting match. Bud and Lou visit Mr. Fields' employment agency.
19	19	"Bingo"	Jean Yarbrough	Sidney Fields	1953
Mike the Cop tells Lou that he must have a license for his pet chimp. But Lou accidentally applies for a marriage license.
20	20	"Hillary's Birthday"	Jean Yarbrough	Sidney Fields	1953
While shopping for Hillary Brooke's birthday present, Lou nearly destroys a grocery store. Later, at her party, Mr. Fields becomes upset about the noise.
21	21	"Television"	Jean Yarbrough	Sidney Fields	1953
Lou is a contestant on a TV quiz show where he wins a pack of bubblegum. A neighbor slips on a piece of gum and takes Mr. Fields to court where Bud and Lou testify as witnesses.
22	22	"Las Vegas"	Jean Yarbrough	Sidney Fields	1953
Bud and Lou pay $90 for a car and head for Las Vegas, where Lou takes part in a violent game of billiards. The "mudder/fodder" routine is performed.
23	23	"Little Old Lady"	Jean Yarbrough	Sidney Fields	1953
Bud and Lou attempt to help an old lady who has been evicted. They raise $300 and she uses the money to bet on a racehorse.
24	24	"The Actors' Home"	Jean Yarbrough	Sidney Fields	1953
Bud is taken away to an old actors' home where he and Lou perform their famous "Who's on First?" routine. Final Appearance of Joe "Stinky" Besser
25	25	"Police Rookies"	Jean Yarbrough	Sidney Fields	1953
Mike the Cop helps Bud and Lou enroll in the police academy. Lou blows up the gym playing with a hand grenade.
26	26	"Safari"	Jean Yarbrough	Sidney Fields	1953
Hillary takes care of Bingo, who is sick. The whole gang travels to the Belgian Congo to find Bingo's parents. Lou tangles with a gorilla. Final Appearance of Joe "Mr. Bacciagalupe" Kirk

=== Season 2 (1953–54) ===
No. overall	No. in season	Title	Directed by	Written by	Original release date
27	1	"The Paper Hangers"	Jean Yarbrough	Clyde Bruckman & Sidney Fields	1953
Mr. Fields hires Bud and Lou to wallpaper an apartment because they owe rent. Later, as waiters in a restaurant, they brawl with hoodlums.
28	2	"Uncle Bozzo's Visit"	Jean Yarbrough	Clyde Bruckman	1953
Lou's eccentric opera-singing uncle Bozzo comes from Italy to stay with the boys for a couple of months.
29	3	"In Society"	Jean Yarbrough	Clyde Bruckman	1953
A wealthy society matron pays Bud to attend a formal reception and impersonate the Duke of Gluten. Lou comes along pretending to be his cousin, the Earl of Waldo. Final Appearance of Hillary Brooke
30	4	"Life Insurance"	Jean Yarbrough	Clyde Bruckman & Sidney Fields	1953
Mr. Fields takes out an insurance policy on Lou. Later, when Bud takes Lou on a hunting trip so he can get some rest, he suspects Bud and Mr. Fields want to kill him for the insurance money.
31	5	"Pest Exterminators"	Jean Yarbrough	Jack Townley	1953
Bud and Lou are pest exterminators who are mistaken for psychiatrists when they attend to Mrs. Featherton's "aunts."
32	6	"Killer's Wife"	Jean Yarbrough	Clyde Bruckman	1953
A heavyweight prize fighter named Killer thinks that Lou is having an affair with his beautiful wife. Bud attempts to get Lou trained and fit in a gym. Guest Star Max Baer
33	7	"Cheap Skates"	Jean Yarbrough	Jack Townley	1953
Bud and Lou accidentally buy a crate of rollerskates, not knowing that they have stolen diamonds hidden inside. Final Appearance of Bingo The Chimp
34	8	"South of Dixie"	Jean Yarbrough	Clyde Bruckman	1953
Lou falls in love with a counter girl, and lands himself and Bud roles in a Civil War melodrama with her.
35	9	"From Bed to Worse"	Jean Yarbrough	Clyde Bruckman	1953
Bud and Lou attempt to plant a backyard garden in order to win a cash prize offered by a civic group.
36	10	"$1000 TV Prize"	Jean Yarbrough	Jack Townley	1954
Lou wins a $1000 TV quiz prize when he answers the phone in Mr. Fields' apartment, then has to get Mr. Fields out of the way so he can collect it.
37	11	"Amnesia"	Jean Yarbrough	Jack Townley	1954
Lou is in love with a girl he has never met. As a gag, Bud and his friends convince him that he has already married the girl. The woman who poses as his wife then makes his existence miserable.
38	12	"Efficiency Experts"	Jean Yarbrough	Clyde Bruckman	1954
Bud and Lou are hired to restrain a wealthy man's daughters from spending money. The girls then turn the tables on them.
39	13	"Car Trouble"	Jean Yarbrough	Clyde Bruckman	1954
Lou wins a car. But Bud sells it to buy a cheaper one. Using the profits, they go on a vacation to Flint, Michigan.
40	14	"Wife Wanted"	Jean Yarbrough	Clyde Bruckman	1954
Lou will inherit $10,000 from his grandfather in Alaska if he is married. He wants to marry a former girlfriend who is dating a man named Bonebender Brodsky.
41	15	"Uncle from New Jersey"	Jean Yarbrough	Jack Townley	1954
Mr. Fields is about to evict the boys. Bud convinces Mr. Fields that Lou's Uncle Ruppert is a millionaire and Lou is the sole heir. Lou impersonates the visiting uncle. Mike the Cop begins to believe that the visiting uncle (Who had died 15 years earlier) has been murdered.
42	16	"Private Eye"	Jean Yarbrough	Clyde Bruckman	1954
Lou receives his diploma from the Watchdog Correspondence School. He helps a neighbor in the rooming house locate $50,000 in bonds in a haunted house.
43	17	"The Tax Return"	Jean Yarbrough	Jack Townley	1954
Lou receives a tax refund check for one million dollars and thirteen cents. He takes the check to a bank and demands cash, and is followed by crooks.
44	18	"Public Enemies"	Jean Yarbrough	Clyde Bruckman	1954
Lou is mistaken for a crook named Dapper Dan and is forced to take part in a safecracking job.
45	19	"Bank Holdup"	Jean Yarbrough	Jack Townley	1954
Bud and Lou unwittingly take jobs as armed bodyguards for a couple of hoodlums and assist in a bank robbery. They use their share of money to pay their rent, then later try to get it back from Mr. Fields' safe.
46	20	"Well Oiled"	Jean Yarbrough	Jack Townley	1954
Bud and Lou help Mr. Fields, who is being threatened with a lawsuit. Lou poses as a Texas millionaire to help discredit the woman. Final Appearance of Gordon "Mike The Cop" Jones
47	21	"The Pigeon"	Jean Yarbrough	Clyde Bruckman	1954
Bud and Lou's beautiful next door neighbor uses Lou as a decoy to help break up with her mobster boyfriend.
48	22	"Honeymoon House"	Jean Yarbrough	Clyde Bruckman	1954
Bud and Mr. Fields help Lou put together a prefab house in order to impress his fiancée and her parents. A jealous former boyfriend sabotages their work.
49	23	"Fencing Master"	Jean Yarbrough	Jack Townley	1954
Lou insults a neighbor, who is a fencing champion, and Bud gets him involved in an experiment of a mad scientist who convinces Lou that he is indestructible.
50	24	"Beauty Contest Story"	Jean Yarbrough	Jack Townley	1954
Bud and Lou judge a beauty contest and pressure is applied to sway their votes.
51	25	"Fall Guy"	Jean Yarbrough	Clyde Bruckman	1954
Bud and Lou want to take two sisters on a date but their father convinces the boys to put an antenna on his roof.
52	26	"Barber Lou"	Jean Yarbrough	Lou Costello & Sidney Fields	1954
Lou tries to give Bud a rubdown following instructions from a radio show, but he's tuned into a program explaining how to paint a car at home.
