= The Mouse-Merized Cat =

- Directed by: Robert McKimson
- Story by: Warren Foster
- Starring: Mel Blanc; Tedd Pierce (Uncredited)
- Music by: Carl Stalling
- Animation by: Richard Bickenbach; Arthur Davis; Cal Dalton; Don Williams
- Layouts by: Cornett Wood
- Backgrounds by: Richard H. Thomas
- Color process: Technicolor
- Production company: Warner Bros. Cartoons
- Distributed by: Warner Bros. Pictures
- Release date: October 19, 1946
- Running time: 6:24
- Language: English

The Mouse-Merized Cat is a 1946 Warner Bros. cartoon in the Merrie Melodies series, directed by Robert McKimson. It is a sequel to 1945's Tale of Two Mice, with the Abbott and Costello characterizations ("Babbit and Catstello") cast as mice. A 1942 cartoon, A Tale of Two Kitties, cast Abbott and Costello as cats and introduced Tweety Bird. They are voiced by Tedd Pierce and Mel Blanc respectively. This cartoon marks the final appearances for Babbit and Catstello during the Golden age of American animation.

== Plot ==
The cartoon opens in outer space, and moves in slowly on the planet Earth, the United States, and a fictional state called "Mouseachewsetts." The camera continues to move closer, to an overhead view of Fluger's Delicatessen, wedged in between two skyscrapers. The camera pans the interior of the deli, finally coming to Catstello waiting patiently at the entrance of a mouse hole. He addresses the camera and audience: "I thought you'd never get here." He alerts Babbit that the people/audience are here, but Babbit is angry. Catstello failed to gather food as directed, because he fears the cat.

After much resistance, Babbit hypnotizes Catstello and turns him, in turn, into Bing Crosby (voiced by Gil Turner), Frank Sinatra, Jimmy Durante, Rochester (which is removed from Cartoon Network in the United States) and a chicken. Satisfied that his hypnotic powers work, Babbit then hypnotizes Catstello into believing he is a dog. He sends Catstello out to chase the cat away.

At first, Catstello's barking frightens the cat, who hides under a trash bin. But Catstello picks up the bin, and the cat is shocked to see Catstello, rather than a dog. Catstello comes out of his trance and flees back into the mouse hole, where Babbit hypnotizes him again. Catstello runs out barking to confront the cat, but the cat, with a hypnosis book, undoes Babbit's spell and Catstello flees back to Babbit. Then a battle begins between Babbit and the cat for control of Catstello. Like a ball in a tennis match, Catstello bounces back and forth several times between the hypnotic powers of Babbit and the cat.

Finally, Catstello produces two hand mirrors that reflect the hypnotic beams at Babbit and the cat. Then Catstello, hypnosis book in hand, turns the cat into a bronco and Babbit into a cowboy. They ride off together out of the deli, leaving Catstello happily eating cheese, reading the book Live Alone and Like It, and remarking "Oh — I'm a baaaaad boy!" (The book was written by Marjorie Hillis, the editor of Vogue, around 1936 for unmarried women.)

== Home media ==
This short is available on the Looney Tunes Collector's Choice: Volume 4 Blu-ray.

== See also ==
- Looney Tunes and Merrie Melodies filmography (1940–1949)
