= List of The Sylvester & Tweety Mysteries episodes =

This is a list of episodes from The Sylvester & Tweety Mysteries, featuring Granny, Sylvester, Tweety, and Hector as globe-trotting detectives.

== Series overview ==
Season	Episodes	Segments	Originally released	
Season	Episodes	Segments	First released	Last released
1	13	N/A	September 9, 1995	February 17, 1996
2	8	16	September 7, 1996	February 22, 1997
3	13	26	September 13, 1997	May 16, 1998
4	13	26	September 19, 1998	May 1, 1999
5	5	10	September 18, 1999	December 18, 2002

== Episodes ==
=== Season 1 (1995–96) ===
No. overall	No. in season	Title	Directed by	Written by	Storyboard by	Original release date	Prod. code
1	1	"The Cat Who Knew Too Much"	James T. Walker	Tim Cahill, Julie McNally	Carolyn Gair, Garrett Ho	September 9, 1995	406-289
Granny, along with pets Sylvester, Tweety and Hector are in New Orleans for Tweety's canary crooning contest. However, when Tweety is birdnapped by Rocky and Mugsy, Sylvester gives chase, leaving Granny and Hector to rescue their friends.: Villains: Louie Z Anna aka Mr Big with the help of Minnie Julep And Rocky and Mugsy; Note: This episode, alongside many others in Season 1, was dedicated to Friz Freleng, who died on May 26, 1995.
2	2	"Platinum Wheel of Fortune"	James T. Walker	Alicia Marie Schudt	Carolyn Gair, Ken Harsha, Garrett Ho	September 16, 1995	406-287
Sylvester and Tweety are in Monte Carlo, Monaco for Granny's Grand Prix race. Unfortunately, Granny is framed for stealing a platinum roulette wheel, so she and Tweety are on the lam until they can clear her name. Meanwhile, Sylvester is pursued all over Monte Carlo by Pitu Le Pew, Pepé Le Pew's cousin, who's mistaken him for an attractive female skunk.: Villain: Silas Micawber aka the Maid
3	3	"Double Take"	James T. Walker	Story by : Carolyn Gair-Taylor; Written by : Robert Schechter	Kevin Frank, Carolyn Gair, Joel Seibel	September 23, 1995	406-293
A crimewave occurs in Copenhagen, Denmark, and the culprit appears to be Granny. With Detective Nohans of Interpol watching her every move, Sylvester and Tweety must hunt down the real culprit – an old flame named Moo Goo Guy Pan – before he steals some rare Danish pastries and frames her for that as well.: Villain: Moo Goo Guy Pan
4	4	"A Chip Off the Old Castle"	Lenord Robinson	Tom Minton, John P. McCann	Kevin Frank, Ken Harsha, Ryan Roberts	September 30, 1995	406-286
Granny travels to Ireland with Sylvester, Hector and Tweety to investigate the theft of the infamous Blarney Stone. Meanwhile, Sylvester unwittingly discovers a vital clue while keeping watch.: Villain: Duffy
5	5	"Something Fishy Around Here"	James T. Walker	Chris Otsuki	Chris Dent, Kevin Frank, Joel Seibel, Karl Toerge, Roy Wilson	October 7, 1995	406-291
Now in Tokyo, Japan, at the Waterland Theme Park, Granny discovers that Charlene, the world's largest tuna, is missing. Upon investigating, however, Sylvester and Tweety run afoul of the local Triad assassins. But is the culprit the ninja assassins, or someone with another plan in mind for the tuna?: Villains: Tunamoto and Alba Core
6	6	"B2 or Not B2"	Lenord Robinson	Tim Cahill, Julie McNally	Andrew Austin, Chris Dent, Charles Visser	November 4, 1995	406-294
Granny tries to figure out who's bumping Bingo tournament winners on a cruise she got for a lecture.: Villain: Shecky White
7	7	"Bull Running on Empty"	Lenord Robinson	Tom Minton	Andrew Austin, Kevin Frank, Ken Harsha	November 11, 1995	406-288
Granny, Tweety, and Sylvester travel to Spain in search of a thief who has stolen the priceless Pamplona Periscope. This leads Granny on the trail of an old elusive enemy of hers called the Spanish Mole.: Villain: The Spanish Mole aka Senor Gabriel
8	8	"A Ticket to Crime"	Lenord Robinson	Alicia Marie Schudt	Andrew Austin, Chris Dent, Kevin Frank	November 18, 1995	406-292
Stuck with an array of professional (and equally suspicious) detectives, Granny tries to solve the mystery of their (recently) deceased host's death.: Villain: Ed McMuffin
9	9	"The Maltese Canary"	James T. Walker	Alicia Marie Schudt	Kevin Frank, Joel Seibel	November 25, 1995	406-296
In San Francisco, Granny takes personal command of Sam Spade's office and is visited by Jingleheimascmitt, Joel Ferret and Mr. Greenstreek who all presume that Tweety (is currently on the run from Sylvester) is the very Maltese Canary she seeks. Villains: Mr. Greenstreak, Joel Ferret and Jingleheirmascmitt
10	10	"It Happened One Night Before Christmas"	James T. Walker	Tim Cahill, Julie McNally	Andrew Austin, Chris Dent, Kevin Frank, Carolyn Gair, Karl Toerge	December 16, 1995	406-298
Granny tries to figure out who has her brother's $8,000 he made from his company.: Villain: Mr. Totter
11	11	"Outback Down Under"	Lenord Robinson	Robert Schechter	Andrew Austin, Anthony Cervone, Shawna Cha, Charles Visser	January 27, 1996	406-290
The sheep in Australian ranches are going missing, and Granny must find out who's doing it.
12	12	"It's a Plaid, Plaid, Plaid, Plaid World"	James T. Walker	Tim Cahill, Julie McNally	Kevin Frank, Carolyn Gair, Joel Seibel	February 3, 1996	406-295
Granny is summoned to Scotland to find out who has stolen her family's beloved tartan.
13	13	"Go Fig"	Lenord Robinson	Tom Minton	Andrew Austin, Chris Dent	February 17, 1996	406-297
Granny, Tweety, Hector and Sylvester are asked to investigate rancher Sam Fincus' (Yosemite Sam) missing fig crops.: Villain: Sir Issac Fig

=== Season 2 (1996–97) ===
Note: From this season onward, each episode consists of two 11-minute segments instead of a full-length episode.

No. overall	No. in season	Title	Directed by	Written by	Storyboard by	Original release date
14a	1a	"Spaced Out"	James T. Walker	Carolyn Gair-Taylor, Tom Minton, Karl Toerge	Roman Arambula, Kevin Frank, Carolyn Gair-Taylor	September 7, 1996
Granny, Sylvester, and Hector accidentally uncover an alien invasion.
14b	1b	"Autumn's Leaving"	Karl Toerge	Tim Cahill, Julie McNally	Phillip Mosness, John Over	September 7, 1996
Granny, Sylvester, and Tweety encounter Witch Hazel in a creepy New England forest.
15a	2a	"Catch as Catch Cannes"	Al Zegler	Tim Cahill, Julie McNally	Roman Arambula, Debbie Baber	September 14, 1996
Granny and the gang investigate the theft of film prizes at a festival; Sylvester disguises himself as a Hollywood producer to pursue Tweety.
15b	2b	"Yodel Recall"	Al Zegler	John Behnke, Rob Humphrey, Jim Peterson	Carolyn Gair-Taylor, Norma Rivera-Klingler	September 14, 1996
Granny, Sylvester, Tweety and Hector try to solve a mysterious kidnapping of the Von Trump family singers; Sylvester has a run-in with The Abominable Snowman.
16a	3a	"Don't Polka Me"	Karl Toerge	Tim Cahill, Julie McNally Cahill	Roman Arambula, Kevin Frank, Carolyn Gair-Taylor	September 28, 1996
Chaos ensues when accordion reeds are replaced by duck calls at a dance festival; Two cats keep trying to want Tweety for themselves with Sylvester attempting to get him back.
16b	3b	"The Granny Vanishes"	Al Zegler	Frank Santopadre	Phil Mosness, John Over	September 28, 1996
Tweety searches for Granny on the Orient Express; Moo Goo Guy Pan from the episode "Double Take" returns disguised as Granny again on the Orient Express.
17a	4a	"The Scare Up There"	Karl Toerge	John Behnke, Rob Humphrey, Jim Peterson	Kevin Frank, Phillip Mosness	November 2, 1996
Mischievous gnomes cause chaos for Sylvester on board a plane.
17b	4b	"If It's Wednesday, This Must Be Holland!"	Karl Toerge	Carolyn Gair-Taylor, Tom Minton, Karl Toerge	John Over	November 2, 1996
Granny gives a chase to a smuggler who has stolen rare Blue Tulips from Holland.
18a	5a	"Curse of De Nile"	Al Zegler	John Behnke, Rob Humphrey, Jim Peterson	Edward L. Baker, Kevin Frank	November 9, 1996
Granny, Sylvester, and Tweety travel to Egypt to find the missing archaeologist Colonel Rimfire.
18b	5b	"Hawaii 33 1/3"	Karl Toerge	Carolyn Gair-Taylor, Tom Minton, Karl Toerge	Phillip Mosness, John Over	November 9, 1996
Granny, Sylvester, and Tweety investigate the disappearance of Hawaiian Tiki statues.
19a	6a	"Keep Your Pantheon"	Al Zegler	John Behnke, Rob Humphrey, Jim Peterson	Edward L. Baker, Sue Maia Mazer	November 16, 1996
Sylvester steps back in time when he chases Tweety into Pandora's Box.
19b	6b	"London Broiled"	Al Zegler	Tim Cahill, Julie McNally	Al Zegler	November 16, 1996
Granny becomes the next target for the Shropshire Slasher on a trip to London, England; A drip of formula in a lab turns Tweety into a monster on and off which frightens Sylvester. Note: The tour that Granny, Sylvester, Tweety, and Hector go on is called The Tragical Mystery Tour. This is a parody of The Beatles album Magical Mystery Tour.
20a	7a	"They Call Me Mr. Lincoln"	Al Zegler	Tim Cahill, Julie McNally	Kathleen Carr, Kevin Frank, Carolyn Gair-Taylor	February 15, 1997
Sylvester accidentally uses Abraham Lincoln's sacred toothpick and is forced to leave the state.
20b	7b	"Froggone It"	Karl Toerge	Tom Minton	Sue Maia Mazer, Phillip Mosness, John Over	February 15, 1997
Granny and the gang investigate the kidnapping of Michigan J. Frog from Warner Bros. Studios.
21a	8a	"One Froggy Throat"	Karl Toerge	Tom Minton	Kevin Frank, Sue Maia Mazer, Phillip Mosness	February 22, 1997
Sylvester becomes plagued by Michigan J. Frog.
21b	8b	"Mush Ado About Nothing"	Al Zegler	Frank Santopadre	Marty Murphy, John Over, Al Zegler	February 22, 1997
Hector and Sylvester are forced to take turns as Granny's new sled dog.

=== Season 3 (1997–98) ===
No. overall	No. in season	Title	Directed by	Written by	Storyboard by	Original release date
22a	1a	"The Star of Bombay"	Karl Toerge	Carolyn Gair-Taylor, Tom Minton and Karl Toerge	Dave Cunningham, Kevin Frank and Jim McLean	September 13, 1997
Granny, Sylvester, and Tweety investigate a missing Indian film star.
22b	1b	"Happy Pranksgiving"	Al Zegler	Tim Cahill and Julie McNally	Carolyn Gair-Taylor and Maia Mazer	September 13, 1997
Granny and the gang try to find the "Squeegee the Clown" parade balloon.
23a	2a	"Is Paris Stinking?"	Karl Toerge	The Trio	Dave Cunningham, Kevin Frank and Jim McLean	September 20, 1997
French authorities ask Granny and the gang to find out what is causing a foul smell in the city.
23b	2b	"Fangs for the Memories"	Al Zegler	Frank Santopadre and Rick Rodgers	Carolyn Gair-Taylor and Maia Mazer	September 20, 1997
Granny, Sylvester, and Tweety take shelter in a spooky castle which is a home of the vampire Count Bloodcount.
24	3	"Moscow Side Story / Fair's Fair"	Karl Toerge Al Zegler	Alicia Marie Schudt Carolyn Gair-Taylor, Tom Minton and Karl Toerge	Dave Cunningham, Kevin Frank and Jim McLean Ed Baker	October 11, 1997
In Russia, Granny is hired to find the stolen 'Borscht Belt' that if worn makes the wearer a comedian.; At the Idaho State Fair, Tweety finds suspicion in a bake-off. The gang also try to win first prize at the Idaho State Fair pie eating contest.
25	4	"El Dia de los Pussygatos / 3 Days & 2 Nights of the Condor"	Karl Toerge Al Zegler	Scott Peterson The Trio	Dave Cunningham, Kevin Frank and Jim McLean Ed Baker	November 1, 1997
Granny and the gang's next trip is in Mexico where the Mayor is held at ransom. *Note*: During 'El Dia de los Pussygatos', Tweety's statements are followed by a laugh track.; Sylvester and Beaky Buzzard fight over Tweety. Sylvester's scheme to disguise himself as a buzzard backfires when Beaky's Mama falls madly in love with him. In the end, Sylvester becomes trapped in his buzzard costume and is captured by the amorous female bird of prey who chooses him to be her mate.
26	5	"Yelp / Jeepers Creepers"	Al Zegler Karl Toerge	Tim Cahill and Julie McNally Carolyn Gair-Taylor and Karl Toerge	Carolyn Gair-Taylor Dave Cunningham, Kevin Frank and Jim McLean	November 15, 1997
Granny and the gang try to look for a stolen diamond collar at an international dog show; Granny enters Hector in the dog show; Sylvester gets attacked by dogs while going after Tweety; Charlie Dog makes an appearance.; Granny tries to find missing jewels at a party; Sylvester's former partner-in-crime, One-Eyed Jack appears at the party and they have a major fight.
27	6	"Fleas Release Me / Niagara's Fallen"	Al Zegler Karl Toerge	The Trio Tim Cahill and Julie McNally	Carolyn Gair-Taylor and Maia Mazer Dave Cunningham, Kevin Frank and Jim McLean	February 7, 1998
Granny and the gang must investigate the vanishing of performers at a flea circus.; Granny and the gang travel to Niagara Falls to see why the water is being diverted.
28	7	"Spooker of the House / Furgo"	Karl Toerge Al Zegler	Frank Santopadre and Rick Rodgers Tim Cahill and Julie McNally	Dave Cunningham, Kevin Frank and Jim McLean Carolyn Gair-Taylor and Maia Mazer	February 14, 1998
Howard Taft's ghost haunts Sylvester at The White House.; Granny's Nash gets hijacked by Rocky and Mugsy and it's up to her pets to find out what they will do with it.
29	8	"The Fountain of Funk / Yes, We Have No Canaries"	Karl Toerge Al Zegler	Tom Minton Frank Santopadre and Rick Rodgers	Dave Cunningham, Kevin Frank and Jim McLean Ed Baker	February 21, 1998
Mr. Bates, a technology nerd wants Granny and the pets to locate the retro 1970s for him.; Granny and the pets are summoned to the South Pacific to look for stolen canaries on "Kanary Island" with a "K."
30	9	"The Shell Game / Rasslin' Rhapsody"	Karl Toerge Al Zegler	The Trio	Dave Cunningham, Kevin Frank and Jim McLean Ed Baker and Maia Mazer	February 28, 1998
While sailing through exotic Galapagos Islands with Granny and Tweety on a ship, Sylvester falls overboard and is stranded on an island with Tweety where they meet Cecil Turtle.; Granny accidentally gets tickets to "Rassle Mania" and is on the case when someone steals the championship belt; Sylvester winds up in the wrestling ring against The Crusher.
31	10	"Ice Cat-Pades / To Catch a Puddy"	Al Zegler Karl Toerge	The Trio Alicia Marie Schudt and Karl Toerge	Ed Baker and Maia Mazer Dave Cunningham, Kevin Frank and Jim McLean	April 25, 1998
Babbit and Catstello appear in this Canadian hockey mystery for Granny and the Gang to solve.; Sylvester is accidentally mistaken for being a cat burglar.
32	11	"Family Circles / Sea You Later"	Karl Toerge Al Zegler	Tim Cahill and Julie McNally Tom Minton, Karl Toerge and Carolyn Gair-Taylor	Brian Chin and Marty Murphy Carolyn Gair-Taylor	May 2, 1998
Granny and the gang must find the source of the mysterious crop circles; Sylvester encounters Foghorn Leghorn while going after Tweety when Tweety hides out in the chicken coop in Foghorn's nest thinking that Foghorn Leghorn is his parent.; Renegade Manatees rampage against Lake Placid sea creatures.
33	12	"A Case of Red Herring / Roswell That Ends Well"	Al Zegler Karl Toerge	Alicia Marie Schudt Rick Rodgers and Frank Santopadre	Carolyn Gair-Taylor Dave Cunningham, Kevin Frank and Jim McLean	May 9, 1998
Granny offers her help to a famous Swedish lawyer.; An alien is missing in the New Mexico desert.
34	13	"A Good Nephew Is Hard To Find / Mirage Sale"	Karl Toerge Al Zegler	The Crew The Trio	Dave Cunningham, Kevin Frank, Maia Mazer and Jim McLean Ed Baker and Maia Mazer	May 16, 1998
Granny and her pets go to Tokyo to see her nephew, Paul Freleng.; In the Sahara Desert, Granny, Sylvester, Tweety and Hector investigate the case about the disappearance of the Playboy who got drafted in the Foreign Legion.

=== Season 4 (1998–99) ===
No. overall	No. in season	Title	Directed by	Written by	Storyboarded by	Original release date
35	1	"The Stilted Perch / A Game of Cat and Monster!"	Karl Toerge Charles Visser	The Trio	Dave Cunningham, Kevin Frank and Jim McLean Ed Baker, Carolyn Gair-Taylor and Maia Mazer	September 19, 1998
At a bed and breakfast, Granny and her pets solves the mystery about the disappearance of Flint Northwood and encounters a magician criminal Granny has recently put in prison.; Granny and the pets receive a letter from Colonel Rimfire that he is trapped in the Black Forest in Bavaria. Sylvester is taken by the Vincent Price mad scientist and encounters Gossamer.
36	2	"You're Thor?! / I Gopher You"	Charles Visser Karl Toerge	Carolyn Gair-Taylor The Trio	Carolyn Gair-Taylor Dave Cunningham, Kevin Frank and Jim McLean	September 26, 1998
Vikings hire Granny to look for the golden statue of Thor.; Granny is on the case of a cattle herd being stolen from a rustler; the Goofy Gophers are bothered by loud sounds up ground.
37	3	"Hold the Lyin' King, Please / Suite Mystery of Wife - At Last I Found You..."	Charles Visser	The Trio Tim Cahill and Julie McNally	Ed Baker and Carolyn Gair-Taylor Carolyn Gair-Taylor and Maia Mazer	October 3, 1998
Sylvester trades places with a lion for the afternoon.; An Alfred Hitchcock mystery parody has Granny wondering if a mild-mannered scientist is harboring a secret, such as maybe bumping his nagging wife off.
38	4	"The San Francisco Beat / The Triangle of Terror"	Karl Toerge	Jim McLean and Brain B. Chin The Trio	Dave Cunningham, Kevin Frank and Jim McLean	October 10, 1998
Granny and the pets visit San Francisco and investigate the disappearance of a Beatnik's magic flute.; Granny and her pets finds a Musical triangle for a Conductor; Sylvester falls out of the plane and is stranded at sea.
39	5	"Casino Evil / Happy Bathday to You"	Charles Visser Karl Toerge	Frank Santopadre The Trio	Ed Baker and Carolyn Gair-Taylor Dave Cunningham, Kevin Frank, and Jim McLean	November 7, 1998
Granny and the pets go to Las Vegas to help Mr. Winner look for his missing Albino monkey; Sylvester takes in the Albino monkey's place for a show performance.; Granny and her pets go to Baths, England where they explore a bath factory; Tweety celebrates his birthday.
40	6	"The Rotha-Khan / Good Bird Hunting"	Karl Toerge Charles Visser	Brian Chin The Trio	Dave Cunningham, Kevin Frank, Jim McLean and Dave Mink Carolyn Gair-Taylor, Maia Mazer and Norma Rivera-Klingler	November 21, 1998
In Mongolia, Sylvester accidentally breaks the cemented footprints of the mighty Rotha Khan, the founder of the town and it lands Granny in jail; Sylvester and Hector encounters Rotha Khan in person.; While Granny is trekking South America searching for a long-lost ancient idol, Sylvester finds it and the idol makes him mighty and strong; Pete Puma pursues after Tweety.
41	7	"Feather Christmas / A Fist Full of Lutefisk"	Charles Visser Karl Toerge	Carolyn Gair-Taylor The Trio	Carolyn Gair-Taylor, Maia Mazer and Norma Rivera-Klingler Karl Toerge	December 12, 1998 December 26, 1998
During the holidays in New England, Granny and the gang helps get back a little girl's bird that is delivered to a pet shop that the parents sent it.; At Trondheim, Norway during New Year's Eve, Granny and her pets solve a mystery about a giant taking the town's lutefish.
42	8	"Venice, Anyone? / The Fifty Karat Furball"	Karl Toerge Charles Visser	Frank Santopadre The Trio	Dave Cunningham, Kevin Frank, Jim McLean and Dave Mink Ed Baker	January 16, 1999 January 23, 1999
While vacationing at Venice, Italy, Granny, Sylvester and Tweety must find out who is behind the water disappearing.; Granny brings her pets along to a crime-solvers convention in Crimea where Rocky and Mugsy plan to steal the I of Istanbul which Sylvester accidentally swallows.
43	9	"Son of Roswell That Ends Well / A Mynah Problem"	Karl Toerge Charles Visser	Brian B. Chin and Karl Toerge The Trio	Dave Cunningham, Kevin Frank, Jim McLean and Dave Mink Ed Baker, Maia Mazer and Norma Rivera-Klingler	January 30, 1999 February 6, 1999
While renting a relative's cottage for the summer, Granny gets mad when the satellite dish goes out and she and her pets go up in space to go get a general who has dog-like behavior.; In New Zealand, Granny investigates the case about the missing Mynah Bird; Sylvester goes after the Mynah Bird and wants to eat it.
44	10	"Whatever Happened to Shorty Twang / A Big Knight Out"	Karl Toerge Charles Visser	Brian B. Chin and Karl Toerge The Trio	Dave Cunningham, Kevin Frank, Jim McLean and Dave Mink Ed Baker, Dave Cunningham, Maia Mazer and Dave Mink	February 13, 1999 February 20, 1999
Granny and the gang investigates the disappearance of a country singing star in Nashville.; Granny, Sylvester, Tweety and Hector go to a medieval festival where someone has stolen King Arthur's stone that holds his sword.
45	11	"Brussels Sprouts / The Golden Bird of Shangri-Claw"	Karl Toerge Charles Visser	Brian Chin The Trio	Dave Cunningham, Kevin Frank, Jim McLean and Dave Mink Ed Baker, Maia Mazer and Norma Rivera-Klingler	February 27, 1999
Granny must find out who has taken the statue of Napoleon; Granny poses Hector as Napoleon to get the thieves.; At Mount Everest, Granny investigates to see why it's no longer the tallest mountain in the world; Sylvester and Tweety fall down from Mount Everest and lands at "Shangri-Claw" where all the cats think Tweety is the golden bird.
46	12	"When Granny Ruled the Earth / Dutch Tweet"	Karl Toerge Charles Visser	Brian Chin The Trio	Dave Cunningham, Kevin Frank, Jim McLean and Dave Mink Barry Caldwell and Enrique May	March 27, 1999
Granny, Sylvester, Tweety and Hector have ancestors in a documentary back in prehistoric times from 5 Billion BC to 5 Million BC.; In Amsterdam, Granny is there to bid on a windmill figurine which has Rembrandt's famous night watch and loses her glasses and two thieves try to take the figurine for the night watch.
47	13	"Bayou on The Half Shell / Seeing Double"	Karl Toerge Charles Visser	Brian Chin Tom Minton	Dave Cunningham, Kevin Frank and Jim McLean Ed Baker, Maia Mazer and Norma Rivera-Klingler	May 1, 1999
A giant crawdad is on the loose at the Bayou and Granny and Tweety are on the case; Hector and Sylvester are put in obedience school.; Granny, Sylvester, Tweety and Hector go to "Happy Pet Village" for a tour. Meanwhile, Tweety meets Orson (Orson is really the classic design of Tweety who was featherless in 3 Bob Clampett shorts) and they both drive Sylvester crazy and confused.

=== Season 5 (1999–2002) ===
This was the only season to be animated using digital ink and paint instead of cel animation. The final episode, consisting of the stories "The Tail End" and "This is the End", was meant to air in 2000 but the show was cancelled before it could air, and didn't air on television until December 18, 2002, on Cartoon Network.

No. overall	No. in season	Title	Directed by	Written by	Storyboarded by	Original release date
48	1	"This Is the Kitty / Eye For An Aye Aye"	Karl Toerge Charles Visser	Brian Chin The Trio	Dave Cunningham, Kevin Frank, Jim McLean and Dave Mink Enrique May, Maia Mazer and Norma Rivera-Klingler	September 18, 1999
Granny narrates and is a souvenir volunteer at the city zoo while Sylvester is trying to pursue Tweety who lets a Jack Webb like detective and animals get in his way.; In Madagascar, Granny and the gang are in a souvenir shop and discovers Captain Kidd's missing treasure map and they go treasure-hunting for it while Yosemite Sam and his lemur crew try to get it for themselves.
49	2	"When Harry Met Salieri / The Early Woim Gets the Boid"	Karl Toerge Charles Visser	Frank Santopadre The Trio	Dave Cunningham, Kevin Frank and Jim McLean Enrique May, Maia Mazer and Norma Rivera-Klingler	September 25, 1999
In Vienna, Austria, Granny, Sylvester and Tweety investigate ghosts who are stealing the sound of music.; While in Seoul, Korea, Granny's old friend, Mr. Kim who owns a silk factory, discovers his worms are disappearing and only has one more left and Granny leaves Sylvester to watch it so nothing happens.
50	3	"Blackboard Jumble / What's The Frequency, Kitty?"	Karl Toerge Charles Visser	Brian B. Chin	Dave Cunningham, Kevin Frank, Jim McLean and Dave Mink Enrique May, Maia Mazer, Norma Rivera-Klingler and Charles Visser	November 20, 1999
Sylvester and Hector face against each other in a battle of blackboard brouhaha.; Sylvester runs from an overly-friendly ghost named Spooky in a mansion; Marvin the Martian and K-9 make a cameo appearance at the end.
51	4	"Dial V for Veterinarian / California's Crusty Bronze"	Karl Toerge Charles Visser	Dave Cunningham and Karl Toerge Tom Minton	Dave Cunningham, Kevin Frank, Jim McLean and Dave Mink Enrique May, Maia Mazer, Norma Rivera-Klingler and Charles Visser	February 5, 2000
Granny takes her pets to the veterinarian.; A restaurant in Los Angeles is under threat, so Granny tries to solve who is ruining the restaurant's reputation.
52	5	"The Tail End? / This Is the End"	Charles Visser Karl Toerge	The Trio Karl Toerge	Enrique May, Maia Mazer, Norma Rivera-Klingler and Charles Visser Dave Cunningham, Kevin Frank, Jim McLean and Dave Mink	December 18, 2002
Scientists at the Manx Institute have developed a Manx mouse - and it's gone missing. Everyone suspects Sylvester and chases after him. The Manx brotherhood wants to cut off his very special tail. Can Granny solve the case? Would this be the end of Sylvester's very special tail? No!; Sylvester finally eats Tweety and kills him at last, but he's thrown in jail for 100 days and the show is strictly canceled until further notice resulting in the world crashing down on him by an angry mob of thousands of furious people, telling and reminding him that he's a naughty, black-hearted cannibal. Tweety and Sylvester are doomed. This is later revealed to be just a dream Sylvester was having and after being awakened, Sylvester makes peace with Tweety and ends their deteriorating conflict for good.
