= Lost in a Harem =

1944 film by Charles Reisner

- Theatrical release poster
- Directed by: Charles Reisner
- Written by: Harry Ruskin; John Grant; Harry Crane
- Produced by: George Haight
- Starring: Bud Abbott; Lou Costello; Marilyn Maxwell; Murray Leonard
- Cinematography: Lester White
- Edited by: George Hively; Ben Lewis
- Music by: David Snell
- Production company: Metro-Goldwyn-Mayer
- Distributed by: Loew's Inc.
- Release date: August 31, 1944
- Running time: 89 minutes
- Language: English
- Budget: $1,225,000

Lost in a Harem is a 1944 American comedy film directed by Charles Reisner and starring the team of Abbott and Costello alongside Marilyn Maxwell.

== Plot ==
When a traveling vaudeville show becomes stranded in the Middle East, their singer, Hazel Moon, takes a job at a local cafe. Two of the show's prop men, Peter Johnson and Harvey Garvey, are hired as comedy relief, but their act unfortunately initiates a brawl. The two men, along with Hazel, wind up in jail (where Abbott and Costello perform the "Slowly I Turned" routine with a crazy derelict with Pokomoko as the trigger word). They encounter Prince Ramo, a sheik, who offers to help them escape if they agree to help him regain the throne that his Uncle Nimativ had usurped with the aid of two hypnotic rings.

After escaping jail, Peter and Harvey join Ramo and his desert riders and hatch a plan to have Hazel seduce Nimativ, as he is quite vulnerable to blondes. Once Nimativ is distracted, Peter and Harvey plan to retrieve the hypnotic rings to facilitate Ramo's reclamation of the throne.

Peter and Harvey enter the capital city, posing as Hollywood talent scouts, and meet up with Nimativ. He is quickly enamored with Hazel and manages to hypnotize Peter and Harvey, who then reveal their plans. They are imprisoned (and encounter once again the derelict, who this time introduce them to an invisible friend named Mike with clear sound effects from a door, a piano and a broken glass), while Hazel is hypnotized into being one of Nimativ's wives. After Ramo helps the boys escape, they enlist the aid of Teema (Lottie Harrison), Nimativ's first wife, by promising her a movie career. Harvey then disguises himself as Teema, while Peter dresses up as Nimativ. They manage to steal the rings during a large celebration and turn the rings against Nimativ, who abdicates the throne. Ramo again becomes ruler, with Hazel as his wife, and the boys return to the United States with the derelict as the driver.

== Cast ==
- Bud Abbott as Peter Johnson
- Lou Costello as Harvey Garvey
- Marilyn Maxwell as Hazel Moon
- John Conte as Prince Ramo
- Douglass Dumbrille as Nimativ
- Lottie Harrison as Teema
- Lock Martin as Bobo (as J. Lockard Martin)
- Murray Leonard as The Derelict
- Adia Kuznetzoff as Chief Ghamu
- Milton Parsons as Crystal Gazer
- Ralph Sanford as Mr. Ormulu
- Jimmy Dorsey and His Orchestra as Themselves
- Billy Bletcher as Dubbed Voice of Bobo (uncredited)
- Bud Jamison as Overlord (uncredited)
- Duke York as jailer (uncredited)
- Jay Silverheels (guard at execution)(uncredited)

== Production ==
Lost in a Harem was filmed from March 22 through June 3, 1944, mainly using leftover sets and costumes from the 1944 Metro-Goldwyn-Mayer production of Kismet.

Abbott & Costello filmed Lost in a Harem for Metro-Goldwyn-Mayer before they made In Society for Universal, but it was released afterwards. It is the second of three films that Abbott and Costello made on loan to MGM while under contract to Universal, the other two being Rio Rita and Abbott and Costello in Hollywood.

Jimmy Dorsey and his orchestra perform several musical numbers, the first of which backs Maxwell singing "What Does It Take" early in the film.

Douglass Dumbrille's character's name, "Nimativ", is "vitamin" spelled backwards.

== International reaction ==
This film was banned in Morocco, and Syria required that it be edited before it could be shown there.

== Routines ==
- In this film, Abbott and Costello perform the "Slowly I Turned" routine with Murray Leonard. Here the trigger word is Pokomoko.
- In this film, Abbott and Costello also perform their routine from episode 6 of The Abbott and Costello Show, "invisible friend". The invisible friend's name in this film is Mike.
- In this film, Abbott performs a brief version of the "Mirror Routine" used by many comedians from the silent film era onwards. In general, two different people think they are viewing their mirror image with one of them suspicious of that fact and trying to trip-up the "image" into demonstrating that it is another person. Abbott performs the routine with Douglass Dumbrille.

== Home media ==
Warner Bros. released the film on DVD along with Abbott and Costello in Hollywood as a double feature-disc on November 21, 2006.
