= Slowly I Turned =

Comedy routine

"Slowly I Turned" is a popular vaudeville sketch in which a character relates a story about their life to a stranger and is triggered into violent outbursts when the listener inadvertently utters a triggering word or phrase. Versions have also been performed in movies and on television. Comedians Harry Steppe, Joey Faye, and Samuel Goldman each laid claim to this routine, also referred to as "The Stranger with a Kind Face" by clowns, "Niagara Falls" by fans of The Three Stooges and Abbott and Costello, "Martha" by fans of I Love Lucy, with vaudevillian Frank Scannell, "Pokomoko", and "Bagel Street".

== Routine ==
The routine features a man recounting the day he took his revenge on his enemy –and becoming so engrossed in his own tale that he attacks the innocent listener to whom he is speaking. The attacker comes to his senses, only to again go berserk when the listener says something that triggers anew the old memory.

Typically, the routine has two characters meeting for the first time, with one of them becoming highly agitated over the utterance of particular words. Names and cities (such as Niagara Falls) have been used as the trigger, which then sends the unbalanced person into a dissociative state; the implication is that the words have an unpleasant association in the character's past. While the other character merely acts bewildered, the crazed character relives the incident, uttering the words, "Slowly I turned... step by step... inch by inch..." as he approaches the stunned onlooker.

Reacting as if this stranger is the object of his rage, the angry character begins hitting or strangling him, until the screams of the victim shake him out of his dissociative state. The character then apologizes, admitting his irrational reaction to the mention of those certain words. This follows with the victim innocently repeating the words, sparking the insane reaction all over again. This pattern is repeated in various forms, sometimes with the entrance of a third actor, uninformed as to the situation. This third person predictably ends up mentioning the words and setting off the manic character, but with the twist that the second character, not this new third person, is still the recipient of the violence.

== Depictions ==
The Three Stooges performed the sketch in Gents Without Cents, a September 1944 short, as part of a show they put on within the movie. The Stooges' version, in which the trigger phrase is "Niagara Falls", was filmed in 1943 for the feature film Good Luck, Mr. Yates, but the scene was cut at the last minute. Instead of wasting the footage, producer-director Jules White built Gents Without Cents around it. In their version, Moe is the storyteller and Curly the innocent victim. In a unique twist, the third character to arrive (Larry) is the object of Moe's hatred, who is also triggered by the words, but beats up Curly and not Moe. Curly tries to trigger Moe to attack Larry, but instead they both attack Curly, chasing him off the stage. Decades later, Moe performed a version of the sketch on his own as the storyteller on an episode of The Mike Douglas Show.

Abbott and Costello performed the "Pokomoko" version in their August 1944 film Lost in a Harem, and later did a "Niagara Falls" version for their early 1950s television show, with Sidney Fields, who played many characters on the show, as the delusional man beating Costello while they are both locked in a jail cell. The television version ended with Costello’s troublesome lawyer, also played by Fields, entering the scene. Costello asks the lawyer to take the case of the storytelling stranger, and the lawyer says, "Help him out? I don’t know anything about him! What’s his name? Where is he from?" Costello whispers in Fields' ear, to which he responds aloud, "Niagara Falls?" and is immediately attacked by the crazed storyteller. Another variation which also appeared on a different episode of the show was the Susquehanna Hat Company/Bagel Street routine, also done as the Floogle Street routine. A January 1952 episode of The Colgate Comedy Hour included the sketch, once again with Abbott and Costello, but with Errol Flynn playing the delusional man.

The routine also appears in episode 19, "The Ballet" (1952), of season 1 of I Love Lucy, with Lucy playing the stranger with a kind face and a clown playing the storyteller, with the trigger word "Martha". Lucille Ball later performed the "Martha" version on CBS Opening Night in 1963, now playing the vagabond storyteller herself, with Phil Silvers as the stranger with the kind face.

Milton Berle's 1956 Coral Records single release, "Buffalo," replaced Niagara Falls with Buffalo as the trigger word. This performance was written for Berle by future Broadway composer Fred Ebb.

Danny Thomas and Joey Faye reprised the routine in Season 8, episode 20, "Good Old Burlesque" (1961), of The Danny Thomas Show.

Some of the lyrics of 1982 single "Native Love (Step by Step)" by the drag singer Divine are based on this routine: "Step by step / Slowly I turn / Step by step / Come on", as is also the case for the 1990 single "Don't Call Me Dude", by the thrash metal band Scatterbrain. The song is about a man who is triggered by innocently being called "dude" after his girlfriend left him, saying only "Yo, later, dude": "Slowly I turned," he says at the end of the song after recounting how he killed the innocent man with his bare hands. This routine is also depicted in Godspell.

== See also ==
- Burlesque
