= Tale of Two Mice =

1945 film by Frank Tashlin

- Lobby card
- Directed by: Frank Tashlin (uncredited)
- Story by: Warren Foster
- Starring: Mel Blanc; Tedd Pierce (both uncredited)
- Music by: Carl W. Stalling
- Animation by: Richard Bickenbach; Cal Dalton; Arthur Davis; Izzy Ellis
- Backgrounds by: Richard H. Thomas
- Color process: Technicolor
- Production company: Warner Bros. Cartoons
- Distributed by: Warner Bros. Pictures
- Release date: June 30, 1945
- Running time: 7:48
- Language: English

Tale of Two Mice (billed on the lobby card and reissued as A Tale of Two Mice) is a 1945 Warner Bros. cartoon in the Looney Tunes series, directed by an uncredited Frank Tashlin. It is a sequel to 1942's A Tale of Two Kitties, with the Abbott and Costello characterizations ("Babbit and Catstello") now cast as mice. As with the prior cartoon, they are voiced by Tedd Pierce and Mel Blanc respectively.

== Plot ==
Catstello is being chased by a cat rapidly at high speed around the house, yelling "Hey Babbit!" Catstello narrowly escapes into the mousehole, while the cat crashes into a wall. Babbit notices this and asks Catstello for the cheese. Catsstello replies that he does not have any, because he is scared of the cat. Babbit then chastises Catstello for his cowardice, but he fails to change Catstello's behavior. Babbit then continuously slaps his partner on the head.

They attempt to steal cheese that is being guarded by a cat. Their schemes include creeping past a sleeping cat, which does not go so well as Catstello runs off at first time, a small airplane and a rope and pulley system. Finally, Catstello manages to escape the cat with a wedge of Swiss cheese, which Babbit does not like. Fed-up with Babbit constantly ordering him around and repetitively slapping him as well as his ingratitude for all of Catsello's efforts, Catstello continuously slaps him and force-feeds Babbit chunks of Swiss cheese, remarking "Ooohhh, I'm a baaaaaaad boy!".

== Notes ==
- This cartoon was re-released into the Blue Ribbon Merrie Melodies program on January 10, 1953, retitled A Tale of Two Mice. Because the cartoon was re-released in the 1952-53 animation season, the Lydian "THE END" ending card is present in place of the original ending title card. Despite the re-release, the original opening and ending titles, as well as the title card and credits, are known to exist.

== Home media ==
This short is available on the Looney Tunes Collector's Choice: Volume 1 Blu-ray.

== See also ==
- Looney Tunes and Merrie Melodies filmography (1940–1949)
