= Abbott and Costello =

American comedy duo

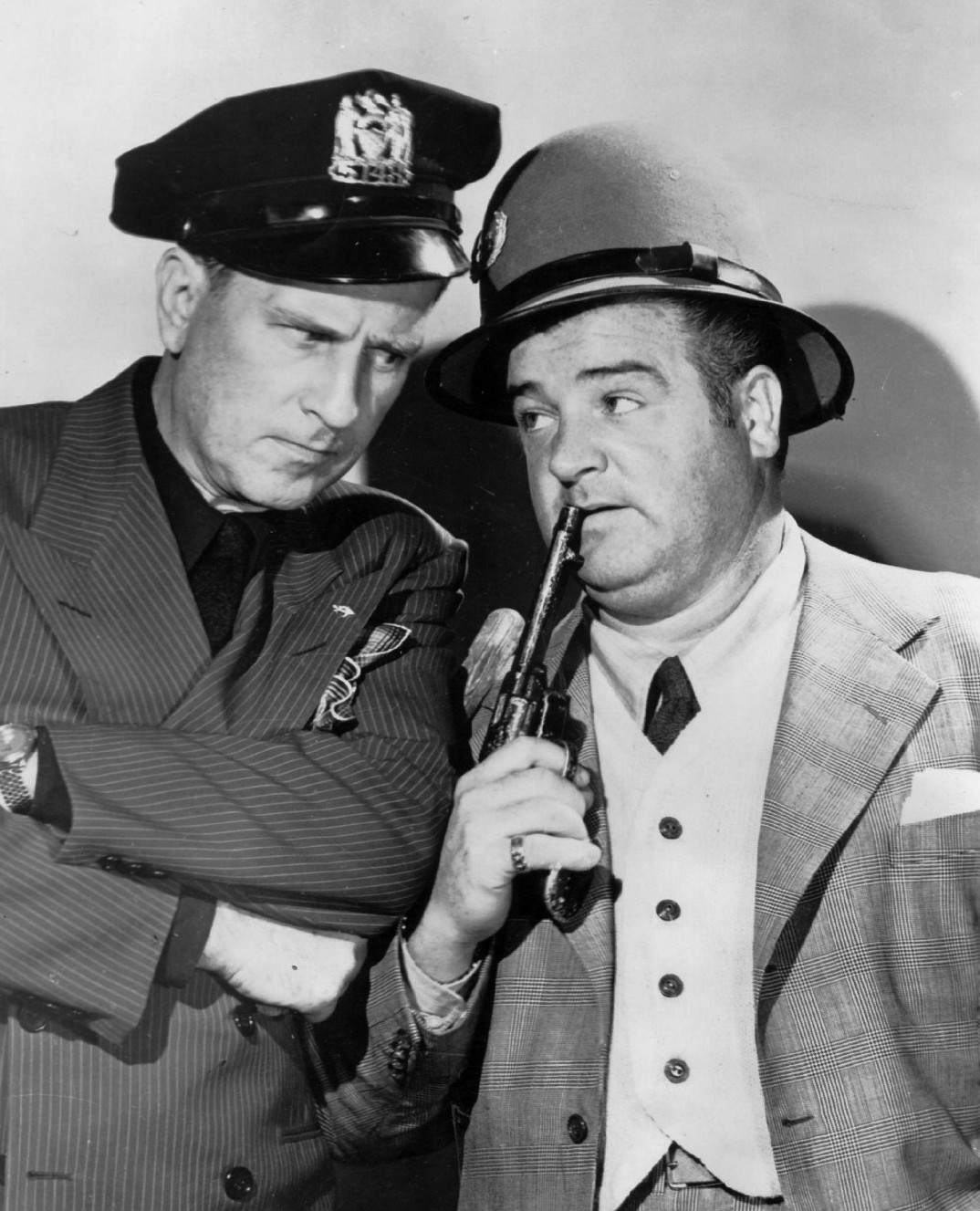
- Abbott (left) and Costello (right) circa 1940s
- Born: New Jersey, U.S.
- Notable work: Abbott and Costello Meet Frankenstein; Hold That Ghost; The Naughty Nineties; The Time of Their Lives; Who Done It? Buck Privates; The Abbott and Costello Show

Comedy career
- Years active: 1935–1957
- Medium: Burlesque, vaudeville, film, radio, television
- Genres: Word play, physical comedy, surreal humour
- Former members: Bud Abbott; Lou Costello

Abbott and Costello were an American comedy duo composed of comedians Bud Abbott and Lou Costello, whose work in radio, film, and television made them the most popular comedy team of the 1940s and 1950s, and the highest-paid entertainers in the world during the Second World War. Their patter routine "Who's on First?" is considered one of the most famous comedy routines of all time, a version of which appears in their 1945 film The Naughty Nineties.

Abbott and Costello made their film debut in the 1940 comedy One Night in the Tropics. The following year, they appeared in three armed service comedies: Buck Privates, In the Navy, and Keep 'Em Flying. They also appeared in the 1941 horror comedy film Hold That Ghost, and went on to appear in several other horror comedies, including Abbott and Costello Meet Frankenstein (1948), Abbott and Costello Meet the Killer, Boris Karloff (1949), Abbott and Costello Meet the Invisible Man (1951), Abbott and Costello Meet Dr. Jekyll and Mr. Hyde (1953), and Abbott and Costello Meet the Mummy (1955). Other films starring the duo include Pardon My Sarong, Who Done It? (both 1942), The Time of Their Lives (1946), Buck Privates Come Home (1947), Africa Screams (1949), and Abbott and Costello Go to Mars (1953).

== Burlesque ==
The two comedians had crossed paths a few times previously, but first worked together in 1935 at the Eltinge Burlesque Theater on 42nd Street in New York City. Their first performance resulted from Costello's regular partner becoming ill, and Abbott substituting for him.

Other performers in the show, including Abbott's wife, encouraged a permanent pairing. The duo built an act by refining and reworking numerous burlesque sketches with Abbott as the devious straight man and Costello as the dimwitted comic.

Decades later, when AMC moved the old theater 168 feet (51 metres) further west on 42nd Street to its current location, giant balloons of Abbott and Costello were rigged to appear to pull it.

== Radio ==
With Carmen Miranda, The Streets of Paris, in 1939.

The team's first known radio broadcast was on The Kate Smith Hour on February 3, 1938. At first, the similarities between their voices made it difficult for radio listeners (as opposed to stage audiences) to tell them apart during their rapid-fire repartee. As a result, Costello affected a high-pitched, childish voice. "Who's on First?" was first performed for a national radio audience the following month. They performed on the program as regulars for two years, while also landing roles in a Broadway revue, The Streets of Paris, in 1939.

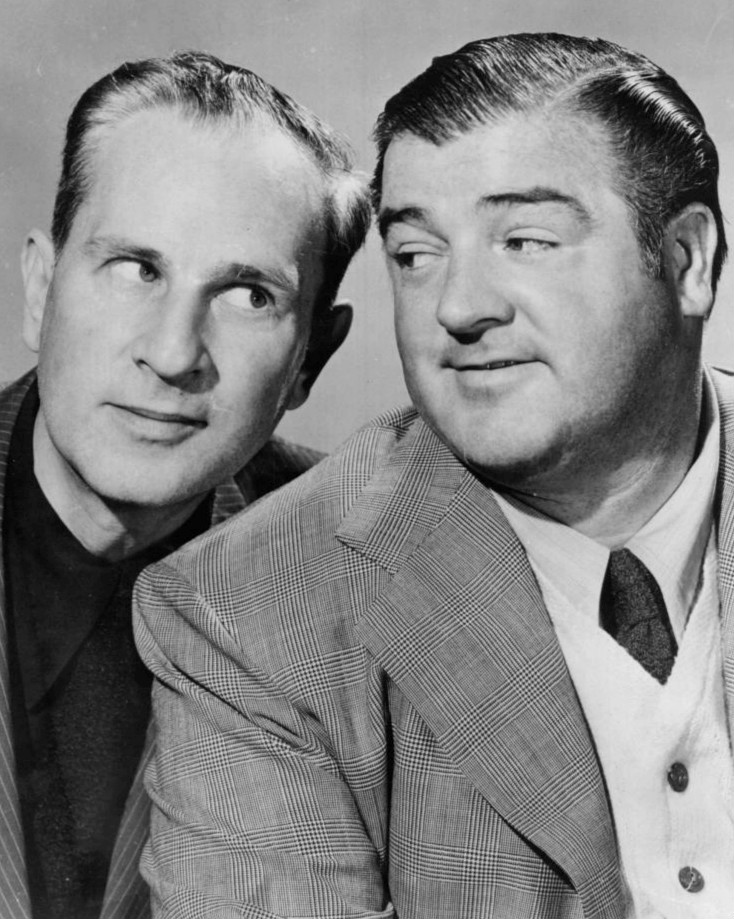
Abbott and Costello on radio (note Abbott without toupee normally worn in films)

After debuting their own program, The Abbott and Costello Show, as Fred Allen's summer replacement in 1940, Abbott and Costello joined Edgar Bergen and Charlie McCarthy on The Chase and Sanborn Hour in 1941. Two of their films (Hold That Ghost and Buck Privates) were adapted for radio that year. Hold That Ghost was presented as a half-hour adaptation on August 1, 1941, on Louella Parsons' Hollywood Premiere, and Buck Privates was presented on Lux Radio Theatre as a one-hour adaptation on October 13, 1941. Their program returned in its own weekly time slot starting on October 8, 1942, with Camel cigarettes as sponsor.

The Abbott and Costello Show mixed comedy with musical interludes (by vocalists such as Connie Haines, Ashley Eustis, the Delta Rhythm Boys, Skinnay Ennis, Marilyn Maxwell and the Les Baxter Singers).

Among the show's regular and semi-regular performers were Joe Kirk (Costello's brother-in-law) as the excitable Sicilian immigrant Mr. Bacciagalupe, Artie Auerbach as Mr. Kitzel, Elvia Allman, Iris Adrian, Mel Blanc, Wally Brown, Sharon Douglas, Verna Felton, Sidney Fields, Frank Nelson, Martha Wentworth and Benay Venuta. Guest stars included Cary Grant, Frank Sinatra, The Andrews Sisters and Lucille Ball.

Ken Niles was the show's longtime announcer, doubling as an exasperated foil to Costello, who routinely insulted his on-air wife (played by Elvia Allman). Niles was succeeded by Michael Roy, alternating over the years with Frank Bingman and Jim Doyle.

The show went through several orchestras, including those of Ennis, Charles Hoff, Matty Matlock, Matty Malneck, Jack Meakin, Will Osborne, Fred Rich, Leith Stevens and Peter van Steeden.

The show's writers included Howard Harris, Hal Fimberg, Parke Levy, Don Prindle, Eddie Cherkose (later known as Eddie Maxwell), Leonard B. Stern, Martin Ragaway, Paul Conlan and Eddie Forman, as well as producer Martin Gosch. Sound effects were handled primarily by Floyd Caton.

In 1947, the show moved to ABC (the former NBC Blue Network). During their time on ABC the duo also hosted a 30-minute children's radio program (The Abbott and Costello Children's Show) on Saturday mornings. The program featured child vocalist Anna Mae Slaughter and child announcer Johnny McGovern. It finished its run in 1949.

== Film ==
In 1940, Universal Studios signed them for a musical, One Night in the Tropics starring Allan Jones and Nancy Kelly. Cast in supporting roles, Abbott and Costello stole the picture with several classic routines, including "Who's on First?". Signed to a two-picture contract, their second film, Buck Privates (1941), directed by Arthur Lubin and co-starring The Andrews Sisters, was a massive hit, earning $4 million at the box office and launching Abbott and Costello as stars.

Their next film was a haunted house comedy, Oh, Charlie!; however, Buck Privates was so successful that the studio decided to delay the release so the team could hastily film and release a second service comedy. In the Navy (1941), co-starred crooner Dick Powell and the Andrews Sisters, and initially out-grossed Buck Privates. Loew's Criterion in Manhattan was open until 5 a.m. to oblige over 49,000 customers during the film's first week.

Oh, Charlie went back into production to add music featuring the Andrews Sisters and Ted Lewis. The film was eventually retitled Hold That Ghost (1941). The duo next appeared in Ride 'Em Cowboy (1941), with Dick Foran, but its release was delayed so they could appear in a third service comedy, Keep 'Em Flying (1941). This was their last film directed by Arthur Lubin. All of their 1941 films were big hits, and Abbott and Costello were voted the third biggest box office attraction in the country in 1941.

Universal loaned the team to Metro-Goldwyn-Mayer for a musical comedy, Rio Rita (1942). During filming Abbott and Costello had their hand and foot prints set in concrete at what was then "Grauman's Chinese Theatre". Back at Universal they made Pardon My Sarong (1942), a spoof of South Sea Island movies; and Who Done It? (1942), a comedy-mystery.

In 1942, exhibitors voted them the top box office stars in the country, and their earnings for the fiscal year were $789,026. The team did a 35-day tour during the summer of 1942 to promote and sell War Bonds. The Treasury Department credited them with $85 million in sales.

After the tour the team starred in It Ain't Hay (1943), from a story by Damon Runyon; and Hit the Ice (1943).

Costello was stricken with rheumatic fever upon his return from a winter tour of army bases in March 1943 and was bedridden for approximately six months. On November 4, 1943, the same day that Costello returned to radio after a one-year hiatus due to his illness, his infant son Lou Jr. (nicknamed "Butch" and born November 6, 1942) died in an accidental drowning in the family's swimming pool. Maxene Andrews remembers visiting Costello with sisters Patty and LaVerne during his illness, and remembered how Costello's demeanor changed after the tragic loss of his son, recalling, "He didn't seem as fun-loving and as warm...He seemed to anger easily...there was a difference in his attitude".

After Costello recovered, the duo returned to MGM for Lost in a Harem (1944) then were back at Universal for In Society (1944), Here Come the Co-Eds (1945) and The Naughty Nineties (1945). Their third and final film for MGM was Abbott and Costello in Hollywood (1945).

In 1945, a rift developed when Abbott hired a domestic servant who had been fired by Costello. Costello refused to speak to his partner except when performing. The following year they made two films, Little Giant and The Time of Their Lives, in which they appeared as separate characters rather than as a team. This was likely the result of the tensions between them, plus the fact that their most recent films had not performed as well at the box office. Abbott resolved the rift when he suggested naming Costello's pet charity, a foundation for underprivileged children, the "Lou Costello Jr. Youth Foundation." The facility opened in 1947 and still serves the Boyle Heights district of Los Angeles.

Abbott and Costello reunited as a team in Buck Privates Come Home (1947), a sequel to their 1941 hit. In The Wistful Widow of Wagon Gap (1947) they were supported by Marjorie Main. They signed a new contract with Universal which allowed them to appear in films outside of their studio contract. The first of these, The Noose Hangs High (1948), was distributed by Eagle-Lion.

The team's next film, Abbott and Costello Meet Frankenstein (1948), co-starring Bela Lugosi and Lon Chaney Jr, was a massive hit and revitalized the duo's careers. It was followed by Mexican Hayride (1948), an adaptation of a Cole Porter musical without the songs. They followed with Africa Screams (1949) for Nassour Studios, an independent company which was released through United Artists. Back at Universal, they returned to horror comedy with Abbott and Costello Meet the Killer, Boris Karloff (1949).

The pair was sidelined again for several months when Costello suffered a relapse of rheumatic fever. They returned to the screen in Abbott and Costello in the Foreign Legion (1950). They returned the following year in Abbott and Costello Meet the Invisible Man (1951); then Comin' Round the Mountain (1952), a hillbilly comedy.

Their first color film, Jack and the Beanstalk (1952), was an independent production distributed by Warner Bros. After filming Lost in Alaska (1952) back at Universal, they made a second independent color movie, Abbott and Costello Meet Captain Kidd (1952) co-starring Charles Laughton, which was also distributed by Warner Bros.

At Universal, they starred in Abbott and Costello Go to Mars (1953) and Abbott and Costello Meet Dr. Jekyll and Mr. Hyde (1953). They were forced to withdraw from Fireman Save My Child in 1954 due to Costello's ill health, and were replaced by lookalikes Hugh O'Brian and Buddy Hackett along with Spike Jones and his City Slickers. Their last two films for Universal were Abbott and Costello Meet the Keystone Kops (1955) and Abbott and Costello Meet the Mummy (1955). In 1956, they appeared in their final film together, Dance With Me, Henry, an independent production released through United Artists.

== Television ==
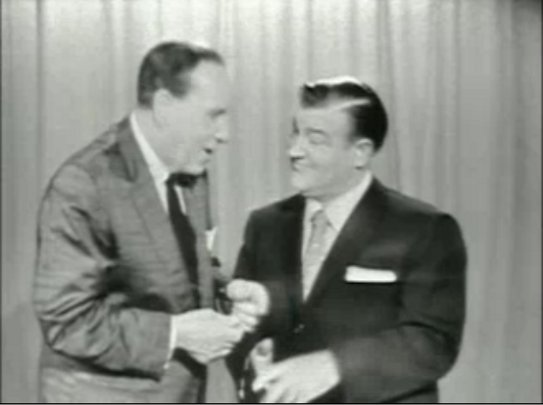
Abbott and Costello on NBC's This Is Your Life November 21, 1956

In January 1951, Abbott and Costello joined the roster of rotating hosts of The Colgate Comedy Hour on NBC. (Eddie Cantor and Martin and Lewis were among the others.) Each show was a live hour of vaudeville in front of an audience, revitalizing the comedians' performances and giving their old routines a new sparkle.

From the fall of 1952 to the spring of 1954, a filmed half-hour series, The Abbott and Costello Show, appeared in syndication on over 40 local stations across the United States. Loosely based on their radio series, the show cast the duo as unemployed wastrels. One of the show's running gags involved Abbott perpetually hounding Costello to get a job, while Abbott was happily unemployed. The show featured Sidney Fields as their landlord and Hillary Brooke as a neighbor and sometime love interest for Costello. Other regulars were future Stooge Joe Besser as Stinky, a whiny child in a Little Lord Fauntleroy suit; Gordon Jones as Mike the cop, who always lost patience with Costello; Joe Kirk, an Italian immigrant caricature whose role varied with the requirements of the script; and Bobby Barber, who played many "extra" parts.

The simple plot lines were often an excuse to recreate comedy routines from their films and burlesque days, including "Who's on First?" Since Costello owned the series (with Abbott working on salary), this allowed them to own these versions of the classic routines as well. The 2nd season was more story-driven. There was no continuity. Although The Abbott and Costello Show originally ran for only two seasons, it found a larger viewership in reruns from the 1960s to the 1990s. The shows have also been released in three different DVD sets over the years.

== "Who's on First?" ==
"Who's on First?" is Abbott and Costello's signature routine. Time magazine (December 26, 1999) named it the best comedy routine of the 20th century. The sketch was based on other earlier burlesque wordplay routines. They began honing the routine shortly after teaming up in 1936, and performed it in vaudeville in 1937 and 1938. It was first heard by a national radio audience on March 24, 1938, when the team were regulars on the Kate Smith radio show. By then, John Grant had been writing or adapting other sketches for the team and may have helped expand "Who's on First?" prior to its radio debut. He stayed on as their head writer into the 1950s.

Depending upon the version, Abbott has either organized a new baseball team and the players have nicknames, or he points out the proliferation of nicknames in baseball (citing St. Louis Cardinals sibling pitchers Dizzy and Daffy Dean) before launching into the routine. The infielders' nicknames are Who (first base), What (second base) and I Don't Know (third base). The key to the routine is Costello's mounting frustration set against Abbott's unyielding formality. Audio recordings are readily available on the Internet.

A notable version is the first television performance on the 1951 Colgate Comedy Hour.

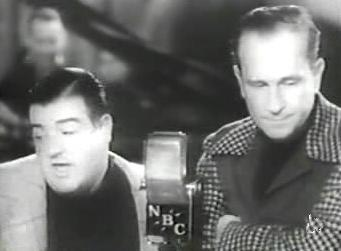
Abbott and Costello performing "Who's on First?"

"Who's on First?" is believed to be available in as many as twenty versions, ranging from one minute to up to ten minutes. The team could time the routine at will, adding or deleting portions as needed for films, radio or television. The longest version is seen in "The Actors' Home" episode of their filmed TV series, running approximately eight minutes. A live performance commemorating the opening day of the Lou Costello Jr Youth Foundation in 1947 was recorded, and has been included in numerous comedy albums. The team's final performance of "Who's on First?" on TV was on Steve Allen's variety show in 1957.

== Personal lives ==
Abbott and Costello were both married performers when they met in burlesque. Abbott wed Betty Smith, a dancer and comedienne, in 1918, and Costello married a chorus girl, Anne Battler, in 1934. The Costellos had four children; the Abbotts adopted two. Abbott and Costello faced personal demons at times. Both were compulsive gamblers. Costello attended horse races and raised horses at his ranch in Canoga Park. Additionally both had serious health problems. Abbott suffered from epilepsy and turned to alcohol for seizure management. Costello had occasional, near-fatal bouts with rheumatic fever.

== Later years ==
In the 1950s, Abbott and Costello's popularity waned with the emergence of Dean Martin and Jerry Lewis. Another reason for their decline was overexposure. Each year they made two new films, while Realart Pictures re-issued their older hits; their filmed television series was widely syndicated, and the same routines appeared frequently on the Colgate program. (Parke Levy, a writer, told Jordan R. Young, the author, in The Laugh Crafters: Comedy Writing in Radio and TV's Golden Age, that he was stunned to learn that the pair were afraid to perform new material.)

In 1952, Abbott and Costello sued Universal for breach of contract for $5,000,000. Universal dropped the comedy team in 1955 after they could not agree on contract terms. In the early 1950s, the Internal Revenue Service charged them for back taxes, forcing them to sell their homes and most of their assets, including the rights to most of their films.

In 1956, they made one independent film, Dance with Me, Henry, and Costello was the subject of the television program This Is Your Life, then formally dissolved their partnership in 1957. In his posthumously published 1959 autobiography, My Wicked, Wicked Ways, Errol Flynn claims that he triggered the breakup. Flynn, a chronic practical joker, invited them, along with their wives and children, to his house for dinner, and afterwards, he commenced to show a home movie that "accidentally" turned out to be hard-core pornography. While Flynn pretended to be baffled, Costello and Abbott each blamed the other for the film's substitution.

In his last years, Costello made about ten solo appearances on The Steve Allen Show doing many of the old routines without Abbott. Costello performed stand-up in Las Vegas, and appeared in episodes of GE Theater and Wagon Train. On March 3, 1959, not long after completing his lone solo film, The 30 Foot Bride of Candy Rock, he died of a heart attack three days short of his 53rd birthday.

Abbott attempted a comeback in 1960 with Candy Candido. Although the new act received good reviews, Abbott quit, saying, "No one could ever live up to Lou." Abbott made a solo, dramatic appearance on an episode of General Electric Theater in 1961. In 1966, Abbott voiced his character in a series of 156 five-minute Abbott and Costello cartoons made by Hanna-Barbera. Costello's character was voiced by Stan Irwin. Bud Abbott died of cancer on April 24, 1974.

== Filmography ==
Year	Movie	Lou Costello Role	Bud Abbott Role	Studio
1940	One Night in the Tropics	Costello	Abbott	Universal; Film debut
1941	Buck Privates	Herbie Brown	Slicker Smith	Universal; First starring roles
1941	In the Navy	Pomeroy Watson	Smokey Adams	Universal
1941	Hold That Ghost	Ferdinand Jones	Chuck Murray	Universal
1941	Keep 'Em Flying	Heathcliffe	Blackie Benson	Universal
1942	Ride 'Em Cowboy	Willoughby	Duke	Universal
1942	Rio Rita	Wishy Dunn	Doc	MGM
1942	Pardon My Sarong	Wellington Phlug	Algy Shaw	Universal
1942	Who Done It?	Mervyn Milgrim	Chick Larkin	Universal
1943	It Ain't Hay	Wilbur Hoolihan	Grover Mickridge	Universal
1943	Hit the Ice	Tubby McCoy	Flash Fulton	Universal
1944	In Society	Albert Mansfield	Eddie Harrington	Universal
1944	Lost in a Harem	Harvey Garvey	Peter Johnson	MGM
1945	Here Come the Co-Eds	Oliver Quackenbush	Slats McCarthy	Universal
1945	The Naughty Nineties	Sebastian Dinwiddie	Dexter Broadhurst	Universal "Who's on First?" routine from this film is featured at the National Baseball Hall of Fame.
1945	Abbott and Costello in Hollywood	Abercrombie	Buzz Kurtis	MGM
1946	Little Giant	Benny Miller	John Morrison/Tom Chandler	Universal
1946	The Time of Their Lives	Horatio Prim	Cuthbert/Dr. Greenway	Universal
1947	Buck Privates Come Home	Herbie Brown	Slicker Smith	Universal-International; Sequel to Buck Privates
1947	The Wistful Widow of Wagon Gap	Chester Wooley	Duke Egan	Universal-International
1948	The Noose Hangs High	Tommy Hinchcliffe	Ted Higgins	Eagle-Lion
1948	Abbott and Costello Meet Frankenstein	Wilbur Gray	Chick Young	Universal-International
1948	Mexican Hayride	Joe Bascom/Humphrey Fish	Harry Lambert	Universal-International
1949	Africa Screams	Stanley Livington	Buzz Johnson	United Artists
1949	Abbott and Costello Meet the Killer, Boris Karloff	Freddie Phillips	Casey Edwards	Universal-International
1950	Abbott and Costello in the Foreign Legion	Lou Hotchkiss	Bud Jones	Universal-International
1951	Abbott and Costello Meet the Invisible Man	Lou Francis	Bud Alexander	Universal-International
1951	Comin' Round the Mountain	Wilbert Smith	Al Stewart	Universal-International
1952	Jack and the Beanstalk	Jack	Mr. Dinklepuss	Warner Bros. In sepia and color.
1952	Lost in Alaska	George Bell	Tom Watson	Universal-International
1952-54	The Abbott and Costello Show	Himself	Himself	Television Show; Presented by Allan Enterprises
1952	Abbott and Costello Meet Captain Kidd	Oliver "Puddin' Head" Johnson	Rocky Stonebridge	Warner Bros. In color
1953	Abbott and Costello Go to Mars	Orville	Lester	Universal-International
1953	Abbott and Costello Meet Dr. Jekyll and Mr. Hyde	Tubby	Slim	Universal-International
1955	Abbott and Costello Meet the Keystone Kops	Willie Piper	Harry Pierce	Universal-International
1955	Abbott and Costello Meet the Mummy	Costello (erroneously listed in the film as "Freddie Franklin")	Abbott (erroneously listed in the film as "Pete Patterson")	Universal-International
1956	Dance with Me, Henry	Lou Henry	Bud Flick	United Artists; Final film as a duo
1965	The World of Abbott and Costello	Himself	Himself	Universal; Compilation film

=== Box office ranking ===
According to Quigley Publishing's Poll of Exhibitors (1932-2009+), who published The Motion Picture Almanac, Motion Picture Herald, and Motion Picture Daily, for a number of years Abbott and Costello were ranked among the most popular stars in the US:

- 1941 – 3rd
- 1942 – 1st (US), 2nd (UK)
- 1943 – 3rd (US), 3rd (UK)
- 1944 – 8th (US), 10th (UK)
- 1945 – 11th (US), 8th (UK)
- 1946 – 20th
- 1947 – 16th
- 1948 – 3rd
- 1949 – 3rd
- 1950 – 6th (US), 2nd (UK)
- 1951 – 4th (US), 4th (UK)
- 1952 – 11th
- 1953 – 20th

== Discography ==
- 1942: Laugh, Laugh, Laugh (Parts I and II) Victor 27737

== Spin-offs ==
The 1960s cartoon series was not the first time Abbott and Costello were animated. During the height of their popularity in the 1940s, Warner Bros.'s Looney Tunes/Merrie Melodies animation unit produced 3 cartoons featuring the pair as cats or mice named "Babbit and Catstello". One of the cartoons, Bob Clampett's A Tale of Two Kitties (1942), introduced Tweety. The other cartoons are Tale of Two Mice (1945) and The Mouse-Merized Cat (1946). In all three cartoons, Tedd Pierce (normally a storyman/writer for the cartoons) and Mel Blanc, respectively, provide voice impressions of the comedy duo.

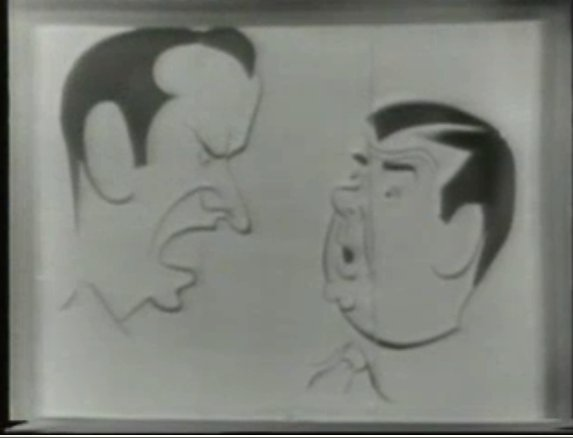
Caricature of the pair from NBC-TV's Colgate Comedy Hour.

The revival of their former television series in syndicated reruns in the late 1960s and early 1970s helped spark renewed interest in the duo, as did the televising of many of their old film hits. In 1994, comedian Jerry Seinfeld—who says Abbott and Costello were strong influences on his work—hosted a television special Abbott and Costello Meet Jerry Seinfeld (the title refers to the duo's popular film series in which they met some of Universal's famed horror picture characters), on NBC.

== In popular culture ==
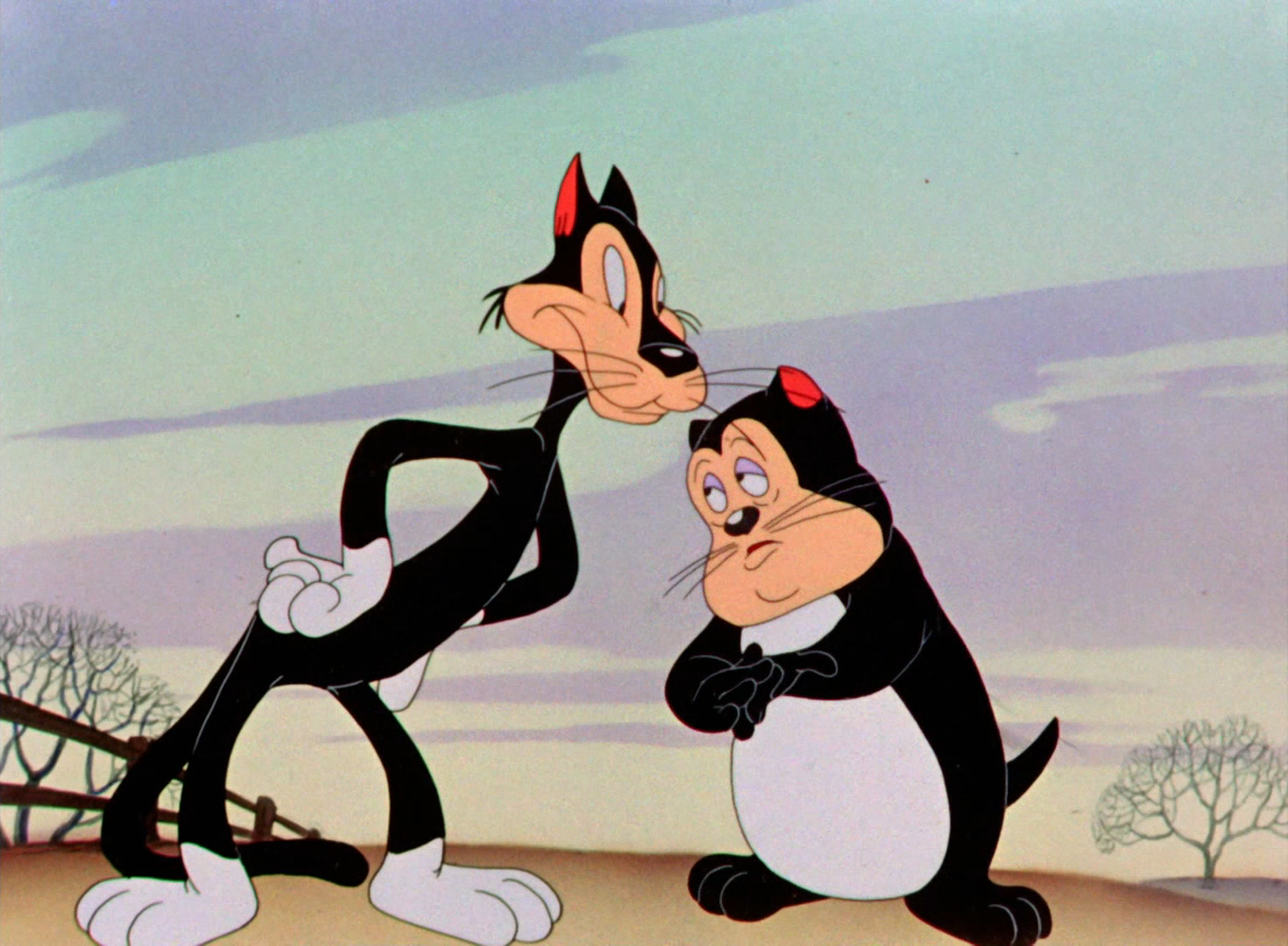
Babbit and Catstello, the duo's Looney Tunes parody as seen in A Tale of Two Kitties (1942)

Abbott and Costello were frequently parodied in Looney Tunes & Merrie Melodies cartoons as Babbit and Catstello, they appeared in cartoon such as: A Tale of Two Kitties (1942), Tale of Two Mice (1945), Hollywood Canine Canteen and The Mouse-Merized Cat (both from 1946). They were also directly referenced in Hollywood Daffy (1946). A catchphrase from Abbott and Costello's radio show, "I'm only three and a half years old" was often quoted in these cartoons too. Even Bugs Bunny's famous catchphrase, "Ain't I a stinker?" was borrowed from Lou Costello.

Although they are not inductees of the Hall itself, Abbott and Costello are among the few non-baseball personnel to be memorialized in the Baseball Hall of Fame. A plaque and a gold record of the "Who's on First?" sketch have been on permanent display there since 1956, and the routine runs on an endless video loop in the exhibit area.

Their "Who's on First?" routine has been referred to numerous times. In the 1988 movie Rain Man, Dustin Hoffman's autistic character Raymond Babbitt recites an affectless "Who's on First?" as a defence mechanism. In 1982, Tonight Show host Johnny Carson performed a topical sketch as then-President Ronald Reagan in which "Who's on First?"-style confusion arose from the names of Interior Secretary James Watt, Palestinian leader Yassir Arafat and Chinese leader Hu Yaobang.

The comedy group The Credibility Gap performed a rock and roll update of "Who's on First?" using the names of rock groups The Who, The Guess Who, and Yes, recorded and released on their first album, The Bronze Age of Radio. On the January 13, 2001, episode of Saturday Night Live host Charlie Sheen and SNL cast-member Rachel Dratch performed a modified version of "Who's on First?" in a sketch. NBC's Studio 60 on the Sunset Strip (2006), a drama about life backstage at a television comedy series, used "Who's on First?" as a plot device.

A TV movie called Bud and Lou, based on a book by Hollywood correspondent Bob Thomas, was broadcast in 1978. Starring Harvey Korman as Bud Abbott and Buddy Hackett as Lou Costello, the film told the duo's life story, focusing on Costello and portraying him as volatile and petty.

Jerry Seinfeld is an avid Abbott and Costello fan and their influence on him was celebrated in a 1994 NBC special, Abbott and Costello Meet Jerry Seinfeld. Seinfeld's TV series includes numerous references to the team. George Costanza's middle name is "Louis", after Costello. "The Old Man" (Season 4, Episode 18, aired February 18, 1993) featured a cantankerous old man named "Sid Fields" (played by veteran actor Bill Erwin) as a tribute to the landlord on the Abbott and Costello TV show. A friend of Kramer's is named Mickey Abbott. A copywriter for the J. Peterman catalog is named Eddie Sherman, after the team's longtime agent. In Episode 30, Kramer hears the famous Abbott and Costello line, "His father was a mudder. His mother was a mudder."

In 1991, the US Postal Service featured Abbott and Costello on a first-class stamp, part of a "Comedian Commemorative Issue", illustrated by Al Hirschfeld.

In 2003, Montclair State University dedicated a student residential complex named The Abbott and Costello Center on Clove Road in the Little Falls portion of the university's campus.

In Robin Hood: Men in Tights, a 1993 spoof comedy directed by Mel Brooks, Dick Van Patten played the part of the Abbot. At one point, a man who looked and sounded like Lou Costello (played by Chuck McCann) yelled "Hey, Abbott!", in exactly the same way Lou did in the Abbott and Costello movies, repeating a joke from Brooks' Robin Hood sitcom When Things Were Rotten in which Van Patten shouted the line. Van Patten responds, "I hate that guy!"

Abbott and Costello were inducted into the New Jersey Hall of Fame in 2009.

In 2015, a non-profit fan film was produced titled Abbott & Costello Meet Superman. The film was screened at the Superman Celebration Film Festival in Metropolis Illinois and is currently streaming on YouTube. Abbott and Costello are played by two actors from New York, Aaron M. Lambert and Jake Navatka.

In the 2016 sci-fi movie Arrival, the two Heptapods (alien beings) are named Abbott and Costello by the scientists, because the one named Abbott is taller and quieter while the one named Costello is shorter and chattier. The names also have extra-diegetic significance as two of the main themes in the movie are linguistics and (mis)communication, which mirrors themes of the "Who's on First?" routine.
