= Abbott and Costello Meet Captain Kidd =

1952 film by Charles Lamont

- Theatrical release poster
- Directed by: Charles Lamont
- Written by: Howard Dimsdale; John Grant
- Produced by: Alex Gottlieb
- Starring: Bud Abbott; Lou Costello; Charles Laughton; Hillary Brooke; Leif Erickson; Fran Warren
- Cinematography: Stanley Cortez
- Edited by: Edward Mann
- Music by: Raoul Kraushaar
- Production company: Woodley Productions
- Distributed by: Warner Bros. Pictures
- Release dates: December 17, 1952 (Chicago); December 24, 1952 (Los Angeles)
- Running time: 70 minutes
- Country: United States
- Language: English
- Budget: $701,688
- Box office: $2 million (U.S.)

Abbott and Costello Meet Captain Kidd is a 1952 American comedy film directed by Charles Lamont and starring the comedy team of Abbott and Costello along with Charles Laughton, who reprised his role as the infamous pirate from the 1945 film Captain Kidd. It was the second film shot in SuperCinecolor, a three-color version of the two-color Cinecolor process that utilized an Eastmancolor negative, as Cinecolor did not offer three-color origination, only two-color origination via bipack.

== Plot ==
On their way to their jobs at the Death's Head Tavern, Oliver "Puddin' Head" Johnson and Rocky Stonebridge encounter Lady Jane, who asks them to bring a love note to the tavern singer, Bruce Martingale.

At the tavern, the notorious Captain Kidd dines with Captain Anne Bonney, a female pirate. She complains that Kidd raided ships in her territory and demands her share of the treasure. Kidd informs Bonney that he has hidden the amassed treasure on Skull Island, and that he has the only map showing its exact location. He agrees to take her, with her ship following close behind in the event of a double-cross. But as Oliver nervously waits on them, he inadvertently switches Lady Jane's love note with Kidd's map. Rocky discovers the mistake and negotiates with Kidd to take them along and share the treasure in exchange for the map. Kidd ostensibly agrees, but he intends to kill Oliver and Rocky once he takes possession of the map.

The voyage begins with the addition of Bruce, who has been shanghaied. Kidd unsuccessfully attempts to regain the map throughout the entire voyage. Meanwhile, Bonney mistakenly believes that Lady Jane's love note was written to Oliver and becomes intrigued. During the voyage, Kidd raids an English ship carrying Lady Jane and kidnaps her.

When the ships reach Skull Island, Oliver and Rocky dig to find the treasure. Kidd arrogantly declares his plans to kill them along with Captain Bonney, who alerts the others to Kidd's true intentions and signals her crew to attack. Bonney's crew wins the fight, the treasure is recovered and Kidd becomes her prisoner.

== Cast ==
- Bud Abbott as Rocky Stonebridge
- Lou Costello as Oliver Johnson (alias Captain "Puddin' Head" Feathergill)
- Charles Laughton as Captain William Kidd
- Hillary Brooke as Captain Bonney
- Bill Shirley as Bruce Martingale
- Leif Erickson as Morgan
- Fran Warren as Lady Jane

== Production ==
Abbott and Costello Meet Captain Kidd was filmed from February 27 through March 25, 1952. As Universal Pictures would not spend the extra money to produce the film in color, Abbott and Costello opted to produce it themselves. Using a contractual agreement with Universal that permitted them to create one independent film per year, they produced the film using Abbott's company, Woodley Productions.

Charles Laughton, at a low period in his career, was paid just $25,000. On April 6, 1952, shortly after filming was completed, Abbott and Costello hosted an episode of the Colgate Comedy Hour with Laughton as a guest. Later that year, the three men filmed a two-minute commercial for Christmas Seals.

The handcuff scene first performed in Who Done It? (1942) is recycled in the film. In this version, Captain Kidd demonstrates to Oliver how handcuffs should be worn by latching them on himself.

== Release ==
Abbott and Costello Meet Captain Kidd premiered in Chicago on December 17, 1952, with Abbott and Costello appearing in person.

The film was rereleased in 1960 by RKO Pictures.

== Reception ==
Critic Grace Kingsley of the Los Angeles Times wrote: "Charles Laughton is here debuting in slapstick, and adds prodigiously to the fun, in fact may be said almost to steal the picture. ... Many of the gags are blase, but there are some fresh ones, too. It's a good take-off on pirate screen yarns any way, and Laughton, besides his slapsticking, adds some amusing satirical touches."

== Home media ==
The film, along with Rio Rita, was released on DVD format on April 1, 2011 through the Warner Archive Collection.
