= In Society =

1944 film by Jean Yarbrough

- Theatrical release poster
- Directed by: Jean Yarbrough
- Written by: John Grant; Edmund Hartmann; Hal Fimberg
- Produced by: Edmund L. Hartmann
- Starring: Bud Abbott; Lou Costello; Marion Hutton; Kirby Grant; Arthur Treacher
- Edited by: Philip Cahn
- Music by: Edgar Fairchild
- Distributed by: Universal Pictures
- Release date: August 18, 1944
- Running time: 74 min
- Language: English
- Budget: $659,526.14 or $679,000

In Society is a 1944 film starring the comedy team of Abbott and Costello. It was the first of five Abbott and Costello films to be directed by Jean Yarbrough. It was re-released in 1953.

== Plot ==
Eddie Harrington and Albert Mansfield are plumbers who receive a call about a leak in the private bathroom of Mr. Van Cleve, a wealthy businessman. The grumpy man, though his costume is ready, does not attend the ball but goes to bed instead. The leak is keeping him awake, but the costume ball that his wife is throwing downstairs is not.

Eddie and Albert enlist the aid of a friend, Elsie Hammerdingle, a taxi driver, to take them to the mansion. While they are upstairs attempting to fix the leak—but flooding the room instead—Peter Evans, a guest dressed as a cab driver, mistakes Elsie for another costumed guest, despite her insistence that she really is just a cab driver. He winds up inviting her to another gala event, Mrs. Winthrop's estate Briarwood, where a valuable painting, The Plunger (a heavy gambler), is to be unveiled.

Mrs. Van Cleve was intending to send Eddie and Albert a letter of complaint for the devastation that they inflicted on her home. However, she is distracted for a moment while doing her mail, and instead sends them her own invitation to the unveiling of the Plunger at Briarwood. They think it is a reward for a job well done and look at it as a chance to meet other wealthy clients. Albert, being a plumber, can only think of a plumbing tool and is amazed at the value of the painting. However, a loan shark named Drexel to whom they owe money (they borrowed money from him to start their business and are balking at repaying him), demands they steal the painting while they are there. When they refuse to go through with the plan, Drexel and Marlow, a crooked chauffeur at the party, attempt to steal the painting themselves. When the painting is discovered to be missing, Gloria Winthrop, accuses Elsie, Eddie, and Albert of being the thieves. However, they clear their names when Eddie and Albert, in a fire truck, capture Drexel and Marlow and recover the painting.

At the end, some guests claim that Eddie and Albert stole their tuxedos and the two are chased across a field.

== Cast ==
- Bud Abbott as Eddie Harrington
- Lou Costello as Albert Mansfield
- Marion Hutton as Elsie
- Kirby Grant as Peter
- Margaret Irving as Mrs. Winthrop
- Anne Gillis as Gloria
- Arthur Treacher as Pipps
- Thomas Gomez as Drexel
- George Dolenz as Count Alexis
- Steven Geray as Baron Sergei
- Murray Leonard as Marlow
- Thurston Hall as Mr. Van Cleve
- Nella Walker as Mrs. Van Cleve
- William B. Davidson as Parker
- Dorothy Granger as Hysterical Woman (uncredited)
- Elvia Allman as Hysterical Woman (uncredited)

The credits at the end of the movie has George Dolenz and Steven Geray roles switched.

== Routines ==
This film includes the classic "Bagel Street" scene—itself adapted from the vaudeville routine "Floogle Street"—during which Abbott and Costello attempt to deliver straw hats to the Susquehanna Hat Company, but everyone they meet along the way has a reason for hating that company, including a lunatic who claims that he was killed on Bagel Street, and each of them destroys a hat until there are none left.

This is followed by another scene where the two men go careening down a steep street on a sofa, barely missing collisions, and causing havoc until the sofa lands in the river.

Another classic routine at the end of the movie was the throwing of rocks to stop the boys in their tracks at a tremendous distance. The point of comedy was no one could throw anything at that distance to hit their target with accuracy. This routine was "borrowed" from earlier comedies such as Laurel and Hardy and later with The Three Stooges.

== Production ==
Filmed from June 12 through July 21, 1944, with much of it being filmed at the Jewett Estate on Arden Road in Pasadena, California.

Although Abbott and Costello made this film for Universal Pictures after they filmed Lost in a Harem for Metro-Goldwyn-Mayer, this movie was released first.

Lou Costello had recently returned to work following a battle with rheumatic fever. As a result, Universal wanted to release this film as quickly as possible. To save time, much of the climactic fire engine chase was lifted from W.C. Fields' Never Give a Sucker an Even Break.

== Home media ==
This film has been released twice on DVD. The first release was on The Best of Abbott and Costello Volume Two, May 4, 2004, and the second was on October 28, 2008, as part of Abbott and Costello: The Complete Universal Pictures Collection.
