= Lucky Losers =

1950 film by William Beaudine

- Directed by: William Beaudine
- Written by: Charles Marion; Bert Lawrence
- Produced by: Jan Grippo
- Starring: Leo Gorcey; Huntz Hall; Gabriel Dell; David Gorcey; William Benedict
- Cinematography: Marcel LePicard
- Edited by: William Austin
- Music by: Edward J. Kay
- Distributed by: Monogram Pictures
- Release date: May 14, 1950
- Running time: 69 minutes
- Country: United States
- Language: English

Lucky Losers is a 1950 American comedy film directed by William Beaudine starring The Bowery Boys. The film was released on May 14, 1950, by Monogram Pictures and is the eighteenth film in the series. It had the working title of High Stakes.

== Plot ==
Slip and Sach's boss, David J. Thurston, has allegedly committed suicide. Slip finds a book of matches with the name of a local nightclub on his boss' desk and finds out from Gabe that a casino is being run out of it. Slip comes to the conclusion that the club had something to do with his boss' death and sets out to find his murderer.

The boys get jobs at the club and Louie poses as a rich cattleman as they gather the information to convict the murderers.

== Cast ==
=== The Bowery Boys ===
- Leo Gorcey as Terrance Aloysius 'Slip' Mahoney
- Huntz Hall as Horace Debussy 'Sach' Jones
- William Benedict as Whitey
- David Gorcey as Chuck
- Buddy Gorman as Butch

=== Remaining cast ===
- Gabriel Dell as Gabe Moreno
- Bernard Gorcey as Louie Dumbrowski
- Hillary Brooke as Countess
- Lyle Talbot as Bruce McDermott
- Harry Cheshire as Chick
- Joe Turkel as Johnny Angelo

== Notes ==
Producer Jan Grippo was a professional magician brought to Hollywood to teach Veronica Lake to be convincing doing card tricks in This Gun for Hire. He later became Leo Gorcey's agent and produced the Bowery Boys series. He performed the card and dice tricks seen in the film.

== Home media ==
Warner Archives released the film on made-to-order DVD in the United States as part of "The Bowery Boys, Volume One" on November 23, 2012.

Preceded by Blonde Dynamite; 1950	'The Bowery Boys' movies 1946-1958	Succeeded by Triple Trouble; 1950
