= Sidney Fields =

American actor (1898–1975)

- Born: Sidney Hirsch Feldman; February 5, 1898; Milwaukee, Wisconsin, U.S.
- Died: September 28, 1975 (aged 77); Las Vegas, Nevada, U.S.
- Occupations: Writer, actor
- Years active: 1920s-1966
- Spouse: Marie E. Collins (m. 1928)

Sidney Fields (February 5, 1898 — September 28, 1975), born Sidney Hirsch Feldman, was an American comedic actor and writer most notable for his featured role on The Abbott and Costello Show in the 1940s (radio) and early 1950s (television). He was sometimes credited as "Sid Fields" or "Sidney Field".

== Early life ==
Fields was born Sidney Hirsch Feldman, the son of Hirsch and Mary Feldman, in Milwaukee, Wisconsin on February 5, 1898. His parents were born in Russia. He began his career when he was a boy, by working in local theaters. As Sidney Feldman, he married Marie E. Collins (b. 1900), also a burlesque performer, on Dec. 27, 1928.

== Career ==
As a teenager, he worked in amateur shows and local vaudeville as a "comedy monologist," and later became partner in a comedy team with vaudeville and burlesque performer Jack Greenman. The team was cast by Harold Minsky in his family's celebrated burlesque theater in the 1920s. The team split up in the 1930s, and Fields obtained work in Hollywood as a writer, contributing jokes for Rudy Vallee on the radio and Eddie Cantor in films. He obtained small acting roles as well in Cantor films such as Strike Me Pink (1936). He also appeared with the Ritz Brothers in Straight, Place and Show (1938).

Although he knew them from their burlesque days, Fields began working with Abbott and Costello in 1944, first in the film In Society (1944) and as a writer/performer on their radio series, where he introduced his Professor Melonhead character. Fields also played small parts in the Abbott and Costello movies Mexican Hayride, Little Giant, and The Naughty Nineties. From 1951 he supported Abbott and Costello on NBC-TV's The Colgate Comedy Hour, and in 1952, he was cast in the team's filmed series, The Abbott and Costello Show. He also wrote the majority of scripts for the first season.

Fields played the hot-tempered, bald-headed landlord of the rooming house where Abbott and Costello lived. He was a frequent target of gags and schemes foisted by the two main characters. Fields also played numerous other roles, almost always wearing a wig, moustache, glasses or other disguise. (These characters were often related to the landlord.) The ensemble cast included Hillary Brooke as a neighbor and love interest of Lou Costello's, Gordon Jones as Mike the Cop, who was a dimwitted comedic foil for the boys, Joe Besser as Stinky Davis, a 40-year-old man dressed in a Little Lord Fauntleroy suit, and Joe Kirk (Costello’s brother-in-law) as Mr. Bacciagalupe, an Italian immigrant caricature who ran different small businesses, depending on the episode.

The show ran for two seasons and played in syndication for decades. After the show ended, Sidney played occasional small roles in television shows, and worked as a staff writer and comedian in Jackie Gleason and His American Scene Magazine.

Fields retired to Las Vegas, where he died of lung cancer, on September 28, 1975, age 77.
