= The Sylvester & Tweety Mysteries =

Animated television series

- Title card
- Genre: Mystery fiction Comedy; Slapstick; Adventure
- Based on: Looney Tunes by Warner Bros.; Sylvester the Cat by Friz Freleng; Tweety by Bob Clampett
- Developed by: Fay Whitemountain
- Directed by: James T. Walker; Karl Toerge; Lenord Robinson; Al Zegler; Charles Visser; Robert Alvarez(timing)
- Voices of: Joe Alaskey; June Foray; Frank Welker
- Theme music composer: Richard Stone
- Ending theme: Merrily We Roll Along
- Composers: Richard Stone(seasons 1–2); J. Eric Schmidt; Cameron Patrick(seasons 4–5); Gordon Goodwin; Steve Bernstein
- Country of origin: United States
- Original language: English
- No. of seasons: 5
- No. of episodes: 52 (91 segments) (list of episodes)

Production
- Executive producer: Jean MacCurdy
- Producers: Tom Minton; James T. Walker; Michael R. Gerard(season 1)
- Running time: 22 minutes
- Production company: Warner Bros. Television Animation

Original release
- Network: Kids' WB
- Release: September 9, 1995 – February 5, 2000
- Network: Cartoon Network
- Release: December 18, 2002

The Sylvester & Tweety Mysteries is an American animated television series produced by Warner Bros. Television Animation which aired from September 9, 1995 to February 5, 2000 on Kids' WB. The final episode, containing the segments "The Tail End?" and "This Is the End", was never shown on Kids' WB, not premiering until December 18, 2002, when the show aired in reruns on Cartoon Network. 52 episodes were produced.

== Premise ==
The show follows Looney Tunes characters Sylvester and Tweety, along with their owner Granny and bulldog Hector (Sylvester's foil in many 1950s era shorts, here given a redesign similar to Marc Antony), as they solved mysteries around the world. Sylvester, of course, is still trying to eat Tweety in the meantime, with Hector acting as the bird's bodyguard. The first season was dedicated to the memory of Friz Freleng, Warner Bros. animator and original creator of the Sylvester and Tweety shorts, who had died at age 88 shortly before the series premiered. The show originally consisted of one case per 23-minute episode; however, starting with the second season, the show consisted of two separate 11-minute mysteries.

Other Looney Tunes characters make cameo appearances, including Daffy Duck, Yosemite Sam, Elmer Fudd, the Tasmanian Devil, Pepé Le Pew, Beaky Buzzard, Babbit and Catstello, Hubie and Bertie, Foghorn Leghorn, Witch Hazel, Michigan J. Frog, Rocky and Mugsy, Marvin the Martian, Hippety Hopper, Gossamer, Count Blood Count, Sam Sheepdog, Cecil Turtle, Nasty Canasta, the Crusher, Pete Puma, Merlin the Magic Mouse, the Goofy Gophers, Hugo the Abominable Snowman, Speedy Gonzales, and the Road Runner. The latter-day Warner Bros. character, Cool Cat, also appears in some form of cameo in almost every episode, and his nemesis, Colonel Rimfire, makes several appearances. Bugs Bunny, Porky Pig, and Wile E. Coyote are the only most prominent characters to not appear in the series.

The final episode of the series never aired on Kids' WB, but did air on Cartoon Network on December 18, 2002.

== Episodes ==
| Season | Episodes | Segments | Originally released | |
| Season | Episodes | Segments | First released | Last released |
|---|---|---|---|---|
| 1 | 13 | N/A | September 9, 1995 | February 17, 1996 |
| 2 | 8 | 16 | September 7, 1996 | February 22, 1997 |
| 3 | 13 | 26 | September 13, 1997 | May 16, 1998 |
| 4 | 13 | 26 | September 19, 1998 | May 1, 1999 |
| 5 | 5 | 10 | September 18, 1999 | December 18, 2002 |

== Characters ==
- Sylvester (voiced by Joe Alaskey) acts as narrator throughout the episodes, and continually tries to devour Tweety for his supper, though he is always thwarted by Hector or Tweety's craftiness. Despite their never-ending feud, the pair manage to get along for the most part, and Sylvester will defend Tweety when someone else tries to harm the canary. Sylvester also unwittingly discovers many clues, claiming as the narrator to have knowledge of the case (though this is probably bluster). Besides chasing Tweety, Sylvester often explores the surroundings, leading him to sometimes be in awkward situations (i.e. being chased by a male cousin of Pepe Le Pew, Pitu Le Pew or using Granny's umbrella to pierce a villain's blimp). Through these situations, the baritone and tenor singing, lisping tuxedo cat endures all manner of pain and suffering, but comes out none the worse for wear. Sylvester is allergic to wool and is jealous of Tweety.
- Tweety (voiced by Joe Alaskey) is a cute but mischievous yellow canary. Tweety is often trying to escape Sylvester by foiling him through either his flying, clever timing, or his bodyguard, Hector. Tweety usually stays with Granny and is responsible for some major clues. Despite his feud with Sylvester, the pair will team up if Granny is threatened and can work together very well. Tweety also serves as a source of ironic humor at times, usually in reference to Sylvester's foiled attempts to eat him. The show also harks back to Tweety's earlier shorts by Bob Clampett (in fact, Tweety meets his old self in the episode Seeing Double, depicted as a separate character called Orson, Tweety's prototype) and he is not above malice towards "dat bad ol' putty tat".
- Granny (voiced by June Foray) is a practical old fashioned world-renowned detective. Granny travels the globe with Sylvester and Tweety, attending events such as races or canary contest and is often called upon by the locals to solve a crime. However, there have been attempts to frame Granny, causing some difficulty in finding clues. She is overprotective of Tweety, and will not hesitate to give Sylvester a good whack on the head. She sometimes calls upon the cat to investigate clues or defend the group while they sleep, though, showing signs of obvious trust. Granny is good natured mostly, but can become stern. With Granny as the main detective of the show, she bears similarity to Miss Marple.
- Hector (voiced by Frank Welker) is Granny's pet bulldog and Tweety's bodyguard. Hector keeps Sylvester from eating the canary and will often beat him up if he gets in his way. Hector will defend Granny, Tweety or even Sylvester if threatened, but is not above stealing food or trying to please others.
- Cool Cat is the most mysterious character in this cartoon. Appears in most (or even all) episodes in one form or another.

== Home media ==
On September 9, 2008, Warner Home Video released The Complete First Season of The Sylvester and Tweety Mysteries on DVD in Region 1. This release comes exactly 13 years since the premiere of the show. No further DVD releases have been announced. Three episodes from season 1 are included as bonus features in the direct-to-video film King Tweety.

| DVD name | Ep # | Release date |
|---|---|---|
| The Complete First Season | 13 | September 9, 2008 |

== Awards and nominations ==
The series was nominated multiple times for a Daytime Emmy Award in the category Special Class Animated Program. The series won two Annie Awards in the category of voice acting for June Foray in the role of Granny.

== Legacy ==
On February 17, 2021, it was announced Tweety would have starred in Tweety Mysteries, similar in concept to The Sylvester & Tweety Mysteries except that the series would have been a live-action/animation hybrid and would have aired on Cartoon Network. However, the series was scrapped in December 2022.

In May 2023, reruns of the series started airing on the Warner Bros. Discovery/Hasbro Entertainment-co-owned TV network Discovery Family.
