= Grace Kingsley =

American film journalist (1873–1962)

- Born: August 10, 1873; Lansing, Michigan
- Died: October 8, 1962 (aged 89); Los Angeles, California
- Occupation: Film journalist
- Employer: Los Angeles Times

Grace Kingsley (August 10, 1873 – October 8, 1962) was the first motion-picture editor and columnist of the Los Angeles Times, beginning the position in 1914 and ending when she retired in 1933. She continued to write film reviews and features on a part-time basis until the age of 80.

== Life ==
Kingsley was born in Lansing, Michigan, August 10, 1873 and was brought to California by her parents when she was six years old.

As an adult, she studied law and took classes in literature. She worked in a law office, and then at night she did drama reviews and features, first for a weekly publication, The Capitol, and then for the Los Angeles Herald. She began working for the Los Angeles City Schools as a secretary to three successive school superintendents.

Her work attracted the attention of Harry Andrews, city editor of the Los Angeles Times, and he hired her to do special features. She began working full-time for the Times in 1910, and in 1914 became the paper's motion-picture editor.

In his memoir, filmmaker Karl Brown described Kingsley's reporting style:

She would not touch scandal in any way, no matter how juicy it might be. She reported picture doings only, not bedroom escapades, brawls, separations, or desertions. Her idea of picture news was to tell who was doing what, where, when, and for how long. This sort of information was vital to free-lance actors, cameramen, and technicians. It gave them a daily guide to where jobs were open or were about to open. Her section of the Times was a sort of trade paper, read by everyone in the business as the first thing to do every morning.

After leaving full-time employment, she continued to write film reviews and features on a part-time basis until the age of 80. Her tenure as a film reporter included covering motion pictures' transition from silent film to "talkers" and in her significant role in the film industry, she introduced such figures as Gary Cooper to the Hollywood scene.

Kingsley died in Los Angeles on October 8, 1962 at Garden Crest Sanitarium and was survived by a sister, Dr. Mildred Mossman, and a niece, Mrs. Grace Nolan. She was buried at Rosedale Memorial Cemetery.
