= The Abbott and Costello Show =

American syndicated TV sitcom (1952–54)

- Genre: Sitcom
- Directed by: Jean Yarbrough
- Starring: Bud Abbott; Lou Costello; Hillary Brooke; Gordon Jones; Sidney Fields; Joe Kirk (1952–53); Joe Besser (1952–53)
- Composers: Raoul Kraushaar (Season 1); Mahlon Merrick (Season 2)
- Country of origin: United States
- Original language: English
- No. of seasons: 2
- No. of episodes: 52 (list of episodes)

Production
- Executive producer: Pat Costello
- Producers: Jean Yarbrough; Alex Gottlieb
- Cinematography: George Robinson (Season 1); Jack MacKenzie (Season 2)
- Running time: 25–26 minutes
- Production company: Television Corporation of America

Original release
- Network: Syndicated
- Release: September 1952 – May 1954

The Abbott and Costello Show is an American television sitcom starring the comedy team of Bud Abbott and Lou Costello. The program premiered in syndication in the fall of 1952 and ran two seasons to the spring of 1954. Each season ran 26 episodes.

The series is considered to be among the most influential comedy programs in history. In 1998, Entertainment Weekly praised the series as one of the "100 Greatest TV Shows of All Time". In 2007, Time magazine selected it for its "The 100 Best TV Shows of All-TIME". Jerry Seinfeld has declared that The Abbott and Costello Show, with its overriding emphasis upon funny situations rather than life lessons, was the inspiration for his own long-running sitcom, Seinfeld.

== Overview ==
The show was conceived as a vehicle to bring the duo's tried-and-true burlesque routines to television in a format that the team could control, without the limitations and unpredictability of live television or the musical interludes or love stories that marked most of their feature films. Basically, if a situation or gag was funny, the team filmed it with little regard to plot, character or continuity. As a result, the show became a valuable record of classic burlesque scenes performed by the duo.

Abbott and Costello portrayed unemployed entertainers sharing a small apartment in a rooming house in Los Angeles. The supporting cast included Sidney Fields as Sidney Fields, their landlord; Hillary Brooke as Hillary Brooke, their neighbor and sometime love interest for Costello; Gordon Jones as Mike the Cop, a dimwitted foil for the boys and sometime rival for Hillary; and Joe Kirk (Costello's brother-in-law) as Mr. Bacciagalupe, an Italian immigrant caricature who held a variety of jobs depending upon the requirements of the script. Joe Besser occasionally appeared as Stinky, a manchild dressed in a Little Lord Fauntleroy suit. Bobby Barber and Joan Shawlee also appeared frequently in small roles. Several episodes featured a pet chimpanzee named "Bingo", who was costumed in the same outfit as Costello; she was later fired from the show after biting Costello.

The show was modified for the second season. While the rooming house format was retained, Brooke, Kirk and Besser did not appear, and scripts were structured like two-reel comedies and less dependent on old burlesque routines.

== Production notes ==
The show was initially put into production in May 1951, soon after Abbott and Costello had joined the roster of rotating hosts of The Colgate Comedy Hour. Episodes were filmed in groups scheduled around the team's movie, personal appearance, and live TV commitments.

Lou Costello owned the show with Bud Abbott working on salary. The first two establishing episodes were produced by Alex Gottlieb, who had produced the team's first eight films and, more recently, their two independent color films, Jack and the Beanstalk and Abbott and Costello Meet Captain Kidd (1952). Jean Yarbrough, who directed every episode of the TV series, took over the producing chores thereafter. Costello's brother, Pat Costello, was listed as the producer, but his function was nominal.

Eddie Forman, head writer on the team's radio show, wrote the first five TV episodes, after which Sidney Fields was credited for the remaining 21 shows in the first season. Episodes in the second season were primarily scripted by veteran writers of two-reel comedy, Clyde Bruckman (15 shows) and Jack Townley (10). Fields received a co-writing credit on five episodes, including one with Costello.

First season shows opened with a title sequence over a montage of scenes from Abbott and Costello's early Universal films. Each episode began with a framing sequence on a stage, where the pair would share gags with the audience and occasionally a fellow cast member, and often set up the episode's plot. They would reappear halfway through the episode and discuss what had just occurred or hint at things to come. These stage portions were dropped in the second season, which followed a more traditional sitcom format. A simpler opening title sequence, without film clips or co-star credits, was also introduced.

The series did not employ a laugh track in the strictest sense; completed episodes were screened for an audience in a theater and their reactions were recorded and added to the soundtrack. In the 2021 4K restoration release, several episodes have the option to mute audience reactions.

The first season was filmed at the Hal Roach Studios in Culver City. The 14.5-acre (59,000 m^{2}) studio, once known as "The Lot of Fun," was razed in 1963 and replaced by "Landmark Street," an area of light industrial buildings, businesses and an automobile dealership, where a plaque marks the studio's former location. The second season was shot at Motion Picture Center Studios (today Red Studios Hollywood), where the team had made Abbott and Costello Meet Captain Kidd. Soon after, the studio became Desilu-Cahuenga Studios. I Love Lucy and the Danny Thomas and Jack Benny shows were also filmed there.

== Broadcast history ==
| Season | Episodes | Originally released | |
| Season | Episodes | First released | Last released |
|---|---|---|---|
| 1 | 26 | September 1952 | May 1953 |
| 2 | 26 | October 1953 | May 1954 |

The show was not a network program when first introduced in the fall of 1952, but was sold into syndication by MCA Inc. to about 40 local stations across the country. As a result, it was broadcast on different days, at different hours, and in different episode order in different cities. In New York City, it began airing on December 5, 1952, on WCBS-TV, leading earlier reference works to erroneously presume that the show was carried nationally on the CBS network starting on that date. (WCBS broadcast the show at 10:30 pm, which was after network programming had signed off and local programming resumed.) The series had already debuted in other cities by then, including Los Angeles. Similarly, second-season episodes (1953–54) were telecast in New York on NBC's flagship station, WNBT (later WNBC-TV), but not carried on that network, either. (The 2024 release of Season 2 arranges the episodes in production order.) The only time the show was broadcast on a network was when CBS repeated first-season episodes as part of its Saturday morning schedule in the 1954–55 season.

The sitcom had a long life in reruns from the late 1950s to the 1990s. In the 2010s and into the 2020s, the series has appeared on classic TV networks such as MeTV and its spinoff/sister network Decades.

== Home media ==
There have been several releases since the early 1990s:

- The Abbott and Costello Show: Shanachie Entertainment: 13-volume VHS series staggered release beginning in November, 1992.
- The Abbott and Costello Show: Shanachie Entertainment: 13-volume DVD series staggered release beginning in January, 2003.
- The Abbott and Costello Show: 100th Anniversary Collection Season 1: Passport Video. September 5, 2006 (The 100th anniversary refers to the centennial of Lou Costello's birth)
- The Abbott and Costello Show: 100th Anniversary Collection Season 2: Passport Video. October 3, 2006 (The 100th anniversary refers to the centennial of Lou Costello's birth)
- The Abbott and Costello Show: The Complete Series (Collector's Edition): E1 Entertainment. March 30, 2010
- The Abbott and Costello Show: Season 1: E1 Entertainment. October 2, 2012
- The Abbott and Costello Show: Season 2: E1 Entertainment. May 20, 2014
- The Abbott and Costello Show: Season 1: ClassicFlix. December 14, 2021. (Blu-ray utilizing the first 4K scans of the original camera negatives and soundtracks).
- The Abbott and Costello Show: Season 2: ClassicFlix. January 30, 2024. (Blu-ray utilizing the first 4K scans of the original camera negatives and soundtracks.)

== In popular culture ==
- In Robin Hood: Men in Tights, a 1993 spoof comedy directed by Mel Brooks, Dick Van Patten played the part of the Abbot. At one point, a man who looked and sounded like Lou Costello (played by Chuck McCann) yelled "Hey, Abbott!", in exactly the same way Lou did in the Abbott and Costello movies, repeating a joke from Brooks's Robin Hood sitcom When Things Were Rotten in which Van Patten shouted the line. Patten responds, "I hate that guy!"
