= Babbit and Catstello =

Looney Tunes cartoon characters

- Looney Tunes/Merrie Melodies characters
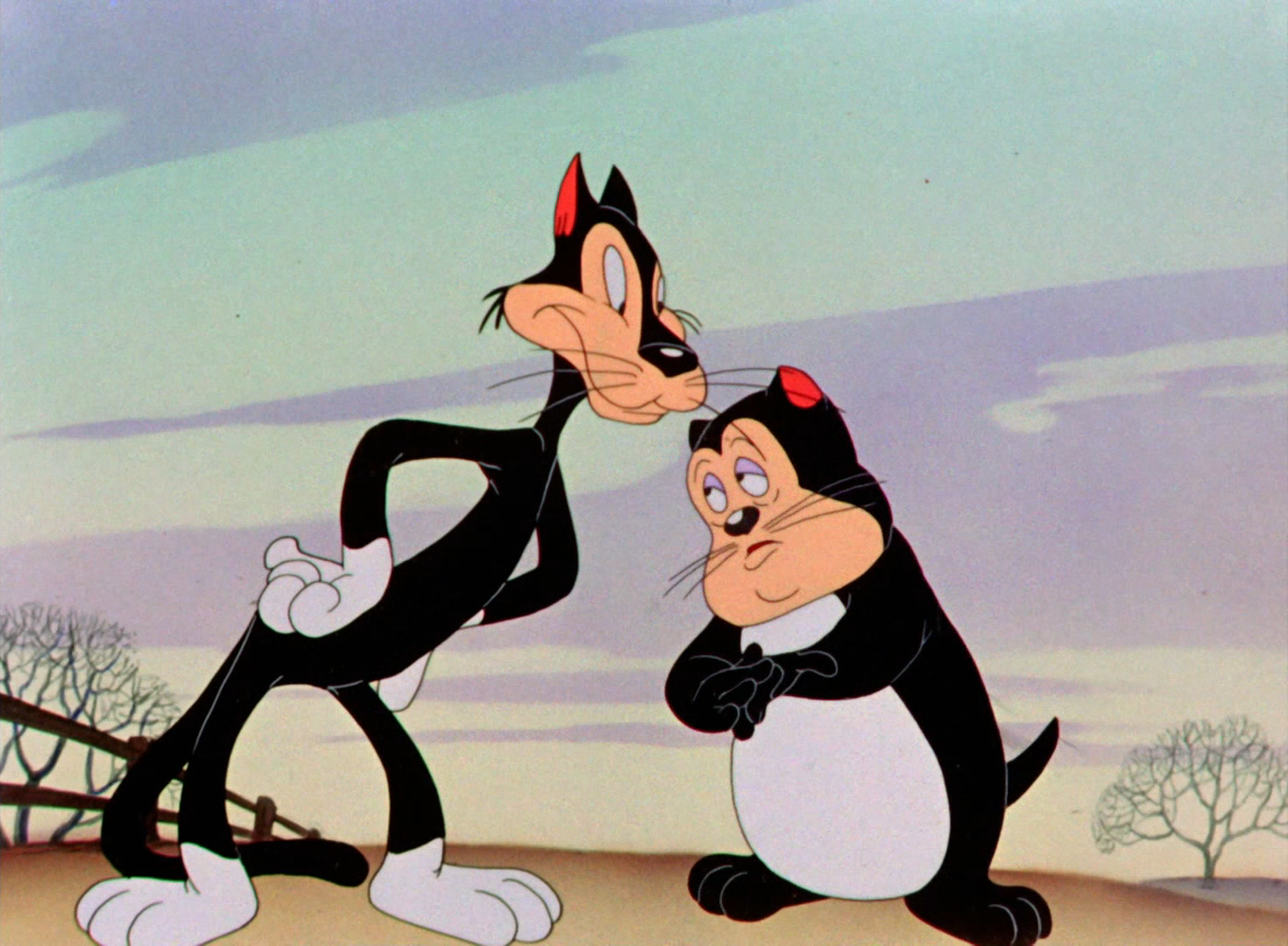
- Babbit and Catstello in A Tale of Two Kitties.
- First appearance: A Tale of Two Kitties (1942)
- Created by: Bob Clampett
- Voiced by: Babbit: Tedd Pierce (1942–1946); Corey Burton (The Sylvester & Tweety Mysteries); Catstello: Mel Blanc (1942–1946) (Note: In The Mouse-Merized Cat, animator Richard Bickenbach, Bob Lyons and Sam Wolfe voiced Catstello's impressions of Hollywood stars.); Frank Welker (The Sylvester & Tweety Mysteries)

In-universe information
- Species: Cats (first cartoon); Mice (second and fourth cartoon); Dogs (third cartoon)

Babbit and Catstello are fictional characters, based on the comedic duo Abbott and Costello, that appeared in Warner Bros. animated cartoons. The characters appeared in four cartoons between 1942 and 1946: once as cats, once as dogs, and twice as mice.

== Overview ==
Although the short, fat character calls the other one "Babbit", the tall, skinny one never addresses his partner by name; the name "Catstello" for the short, fat character was either within production material or invented later. In their first three cartoons, Babbit was voiced by Tedd Pierce, and Mel Blanc performed Catstello.

=== Copyright status ===
The pair's debut cartoon, A Tale of Two Kitties, entered the public domain in 1970, due to United Artists, the holder of the short at the time, failing to renew the copyright by that year. This makes them both public domain characters.

== Appearances ==
=== A Tale of Two Kitties ===
Originally, the pair were cats in pursuit of a small bird for their meal in the 1942 Bob Clampett-directed cartoon A Tale of Two Kitties, a cartoon notable for the first appearance of the unnamed bird character who would eventually become Warner Bros. cartoon icon Tweety. The hapless duo fail in every attempt to capture the bird, establishing the pattern that would be used time and again in future Tweety cartoons. At one point, Catstello utters a variation of one of his archetype Lou Costello's famous lines: "I'm a baaaaad pussycat!"

=== Tale of Two Mice ===
Three years later, Babbit and Catstello reappeared in the similarly-named A Tale of Two Mice, directed by Frank Tashlin. Though their characterizations were the same, the two were now mice, living in a hole in the wall of a typical cartoon kitchen.

Their goal in this cartoon was the cheese in the kitchen's refrigerator, the only obstacle being the resident house cat. Babbit attempts to coerce Catstello (often by beating him up) into going after the cheese solo, using various methods to get it (which involved Catstello getting hurt). However, in the end, it is Swiss cheese, which Babbit can't stand. Angrily, Catstello beats him up and begins force-feeding the cheese, saying Costello's original line: "Oh — I'm a baaaaad boy!"

=== Hollywood Canine Canteen ===
They make a cameo in 1946's Hollywood Canine Canteen as the pet dogs of the real life Abbott and Costello (Costello's dog even refers to Abbott's dog as "Babbit").

=== The Mouse-Merized Cat ===
Finally, in 1946, they appeared in Robert McKimson's The Mouse-Merized Cat, wherein Babbit uses a book to hypnotize Catstello. Babbit has Catstello believe he's a dog in order to scare off the cat so they can get to the food in the refrigerator. However, the cat soon studies hypnosis and is able to reverse Babbit's spell. This results in Catstello running back and forth between the two as they continue using hypnosis. Finally, Catstello hypnotizes Babbit and the cat into believing they are, respectively, a cowboy and his horse. Catstello tricks Babbit with his Yosemite Sam-like voice before he and the cat gallop away.

The final scene shows Catstello eating cheese and reading a book on living alone, before turning to the audience and once again reciting "Oh — I'm a baaaaad boy!"

=== Later appearances ===
The pair have mainly made cameos in modern Warner Bros. animated projects, their most major appearance being in "Ice Cat-Pades", a segment of the 1995–2000 series The Sylvester & Tweety Mysteries. They both are also playable characters in the video game Looney Tunes: World of Mayhem, and later made cameo appearances in the feature film Coyote vs. Acme.
