= A Tale of Two Kitties =

1942 film by Robert Clampett

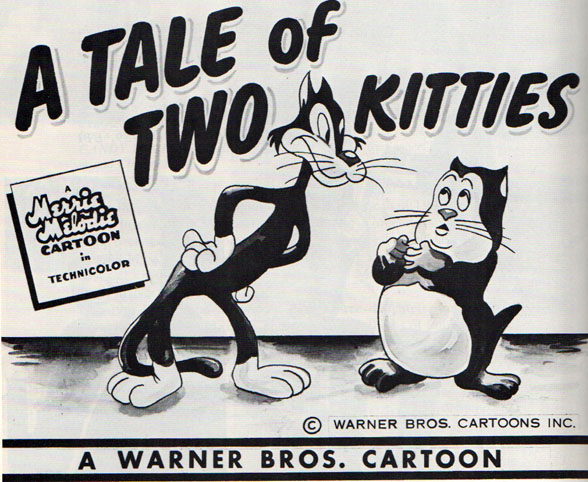
- Lobby card
- Directed by: Robert Clampett
- Story by: Warren Foster
- Produced by: Leon Schlesinger
- Starring: Mel Blanc; Tedd Pierce (both uncredited)
- Music by: Carl W. Stalling
- Animation by: Rod Scribner
- Color process: Technicolor
- Production company: Leon Schlesinger Productions
- Distributed by: Warner Bros. Pictures
- Release date: November 21, 1942
- Running time: 7 min
- Country: United States
- Language: English

A Tale of Two Kitties is a 1942 American animated comedy short film directed by Robert Clampett. It was released on November 21, 1942. It is part of the Merrie Melodies series, the first cartoon to feature Babbit and Catstello, as well as the first cartoon to feature Orson, a character who would later be given feathers and named Tweety. It was re-released as a "Blue Ribbon" reissue in 1948, rendering the original film and credits lost.

The short entered the public domain in 1970, because United Artists, the holder of the short at the time, failed to renew the copyright by that year. This means Tweety's first, featherless, design is in the public domain, in accordance with American copyright law.

== Plot ==
The full film

There are two running gags: The very accurate impression of Abbott and Costello's routines and the riffs on “getting it in the end”.

Enter two hungry cats, Babbit and Catstello. Babbit is beating on Catstello, trying to convince him to climb a tall ladder and “get the bird” (Tweety; then-called Orson) from his huge nest on top of a tall, slender tree. Catstello is at first reluctant, claiming heightrophobia, but Babbit jabs him in the rear with a pin, sending him flying to the top of the ladder. As Babbit cries “give me the bird” Catstello says to the audience “If the Hays Office would only let me, I would give him the bird all right.” He swipes at the tiny sleeping, featherless bird and misses. The ladder splits in two, becoming stilts and Babbitt catches him as he slides down one leg. Babbit then puts Catstello through the following attempts to catch the bird, in vain:

1. First, he launches Catstello into the air using a jack-in-the-box: He keeps on bouncing. When Orson first sees Catstello, he speaks to the audience in surprise "I tawt I taw a putty tat!" He hits the cat with a club, and turns every attempt by the Catstello to protect himself against him, finally putting a stick of dynamite inside the window of a divers' helmet. “ Oh the poor putty tat,” the bird exclaims. “ he crushed his little head!” Orson gives an evil grin.
2. The despondent Catstello is consoling himself by munching on an apple, but Babbit promises he will “get it in the end”, and sends his buddy soaring by exploding the TNT barrel he is sitting on. As Catstello overshoots, Orson grabs the apple, pulls out a worm and devours it. The cat crashes onto the roof of a barn, slides down and ends hanging by one paw, upside down, on a wire. Orson then plays "This Little Pitty” with the cat's toes, until he falls. Orson attempts to "save" the cat by giving him a rope tied to an anvil, which falls off the roof and crash lands onto Catstello sending him deep into the ground. Babbitt drags a Victory Garden up to the hole and pulls the anvil up, with Catstello plastered to it. He peels his buddy off the anvil and restores his three dimensional state.
3. Finally, Babbit attaches a long wooden plank to Catstello's arms, turning him into a glider. By this time, it is night. Catstello declares he is a Spitfire, expectorating enthusiastically. He speeds by Orson's nest, waking the bird, who puts on his Air Raid Warden's hat and reports this as an unidentified object. Catstello is swiftly shot down. He is falling toward a pitchfork, but halts midair and moves to one side, landing safely on Babbit.

Orson walks in front of their noses announcing a "total bwackout". “ Now's our chance” Babbitt whispers but just as Babbit and Catstello are about to devour him, the bird hollers “Turn Out Those Lights!” and their eyes blink out.

== Voice cast ==
- Mel Blanc as Catstello and Orson
- Tedd Pierce as Babbit

== Production ==
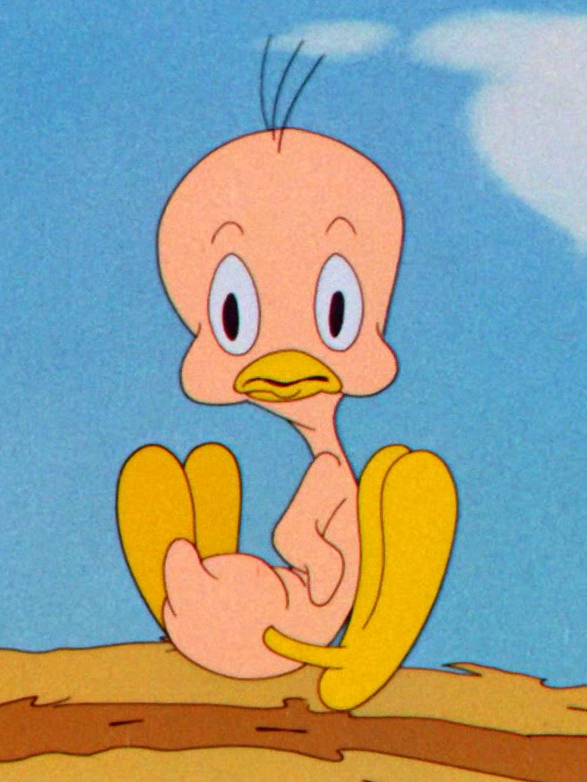
Tweety's debut appearance, as Orson

Tweety was originally referred to as "Orson" during the production of this cartoon, and was depicted as an aggressive pink baby bird in his first three appearances rather than the timid yellow canary he's better known as. Tweety's design was previously used for a different baby bird in one of Clampett's previous shorts, Wacky Blackout. According to Clampett, Tweety's initial design was based on the director's baby pictures, and that his characterization was based on Red Skelton's character "Junior the Mean Widdle Kid."

The cartoon contains a jab at the movie industry's self-censorship bureau. When Babbit demands Catstello to give him the bird, Catstello breaks the fourth wall by telling the audience "If the Hays Office would only let me, I'd give him the 'boid,' all right!", which is a reference to the middle finger. Unlike a similar gag in Farm Frolics (1941), Warner Bros. did not cut out the gag in the reissued version.

== See also ==
- List of animated films in the public domain in the United States
