= Hillary Brooke =

American actress (1914–1999)

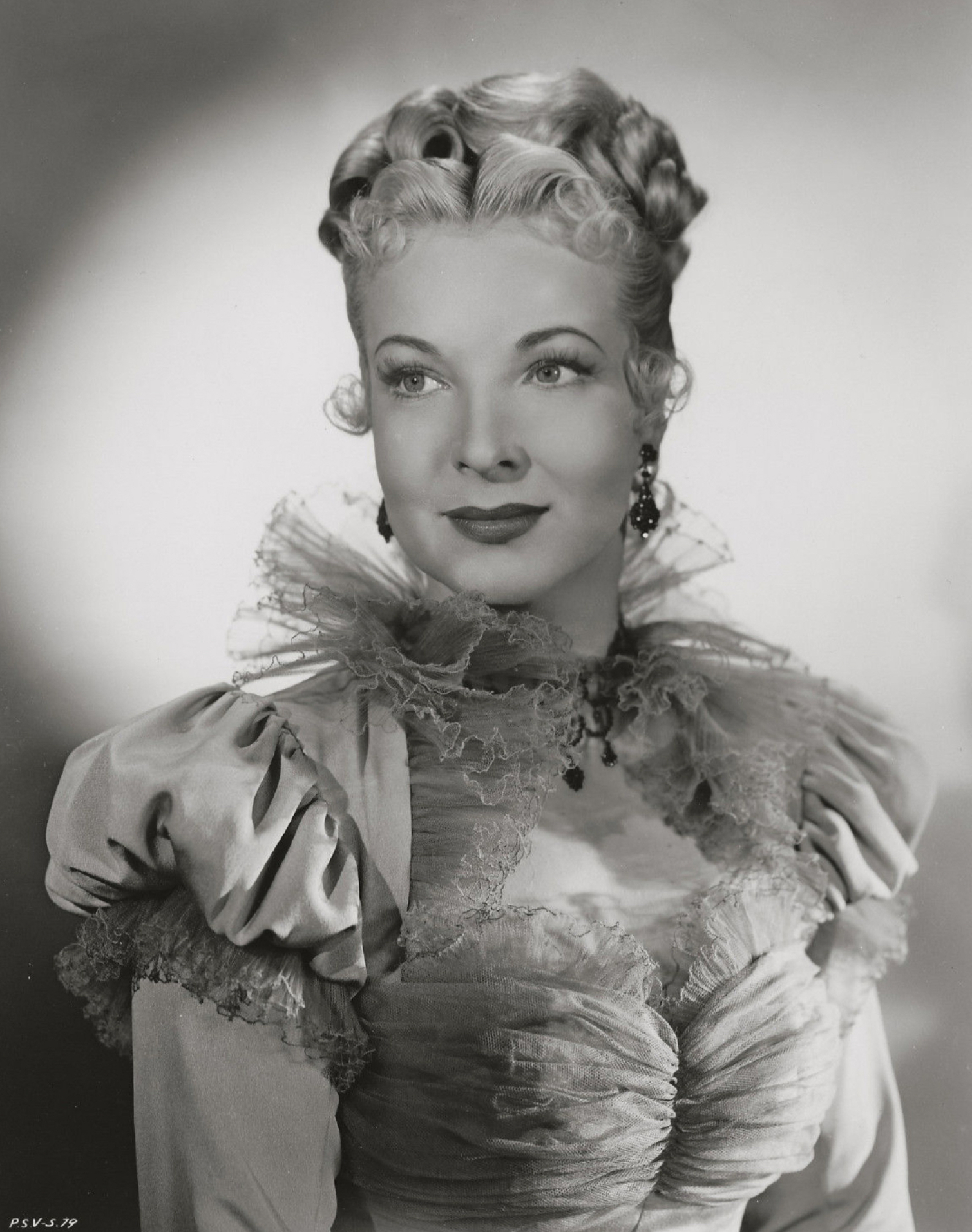
- Brooke in Vendetta (1950)
- Born: Beatrice Sofia Mathilda Peterson; September 8, 1914; Astoria, New York, U.S.
- Died: May 25, 1999 (aged 84); Bonsall, California, U.S.
- Other name: Hillary Brook
- Education: Columbia University
- Occupation: Actress
- Years active: 1937–1960
- Spouses: Alan Shute (m. 1936; div. 1940) Jack Voglin (m. 1941; div. 1948) Raymond A. Klune (m. 1960; died 1988)
- Children: 3

Hillary Brooke (born Beatrice Sofia Mathilda Peterson; September 8, 1914 – May 25, 1999) was an American film actress.

== Career ==
A 5′6″ blonde from the Astoria neighborhood of New York City's borough of Queens, Brooke, who was of Swedish ancestry, started work as a model while attending Columbia University. She spent a year in the United Kingdom, mastering an RP accent that she used in several of her films. She frequently played English women in Hollywood films, and also had such a role in her only British-made film, The House Across the Lake.

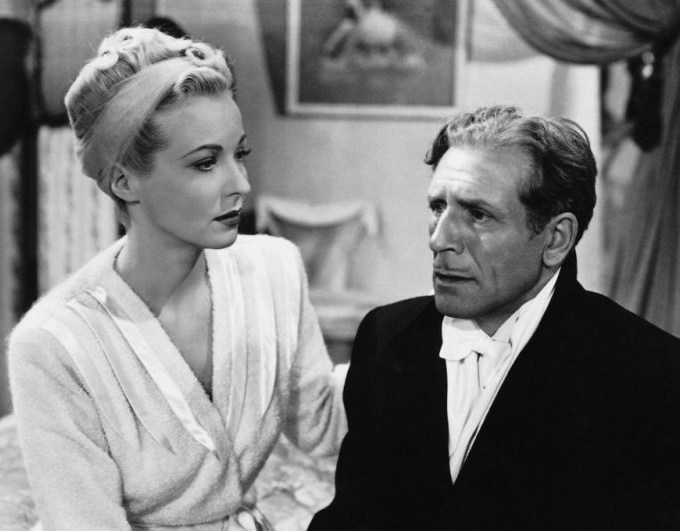
With Paul Cavanagh in The Woman in Green

Brooke began her acting career in movies, where she changed her name to Hillary Brooke because, as she put it, she thought her own name was “so long and so heavy". She co-starred in three Sherlock Holmes films with Basil Rathbone and Nigel Bruce, Sherlock Holmes and the Voice of Terror (1942), Sherlock Holmes Faces Death (1943) and The Woman in Green (1945).

She was a regular on several television series of the early 1950s, playing Roberta Townsend, the glamorous love interest of Margie's father Vern Albright on the 1952–1955 TV series My Little Margie. On The Abbott and Costello Show, produced in the early 1950s and syndicated for many years afterward, Brooke played the role of a straitlaced, classy tenant of the rooming house where the two main characters lived. She was treated with reverence by the duo and was not a target of pranks and slapstick. The love interest of Lou Costello, she always addressed him as "Louis". As with the other main characters, her character's name was her real name. She also appeared in Africa Screams (1949) and Abbott and Costello Meet Captain Kidd (1952) with the comedy team.

Brooke's other movie credits include Jane Eyre (1943), The Enchanted Cottage (1945), Lucky Losers (1950) with The Bowery Boys, the Alfred Hitchcock thriller The Man Who Knew Too Much (1956), the 3-D film The Maze (1953), and William Cameron Menzies classic Invaders from Mars (1953).

On September 28, 1957, she played Doris Cole in the second episode of Perry Mason, titled "The Case of the Sleepwalker's Niece". She had been strangled by Mason star Raymond Burr seven years earlier in the film Unmasked. Brooke also played Angela Randall in I Love Lucy's "The Fox Hunt", which aired February 6, 1956. She retired from television in 1960 following guest appearances on Richard Diamond, Private Detective as Laura Renault and in Michael Shayne as Greta Morgan.

== Personal life ==
Brooke married Alan Shute in 1936, divorcing in 1940. Brooke then married assistant director Jack Voglin in 1941, and the couple had one child together, Donald, before divorcing in 1948. Brooke was married to Raymond A. Klune, an executive at MGM, from 1960 until his death on September 24, 1988. Through Klune she had two stepchildren, Carol V. Klune and Donald C. Klune.

On May 25, 1999, Brooke died from a blood clot in the lung at a hospital in Bonsall, California. She was cremated with her ashes scattered in the Pacific Ocean. She had two brothers, one of whom was called Arthur (1912-2008), but who was not actor Arthur Peterson Jr. (1918-1996), as has often been claimed in recent years. Her actual brother is mentioned among surviving kin in her obituaries.

For her contribution to the television industry, Hillary Brooke has a star on the Hollywood Walk of Fame at 6307 Hollywood Boulevard.

== Quotes ==
She refused to play dumb blondes.
"Vacuity will never substitute for a glint of intelligence," she remarked. "However, anyone, man or woman, who is ostentatiously erudite, is lacking in something else or else is just a crashing bore."

"I never thought I was a great actress. Maybe I would have been better if I'd worked harder at it. But I really enjoyed my career and the wonderful people I worked with."

== Partial filmography ==
- New Faces of 1937 (1937) – Showgirl (billed as Beatrice Schute)
- Eternally Yours (1939) – Blonde on Stage (uncredited)
- Two Girls on Broadway (1940) – Second Girl in Powder Room (uncredited)
- Florian (1940) – Horsewoman (uncredited)
- New Moon (1940) – Party Guest (uncredited)
- The Philadelphia Story (1940) – Main Line Society Woman (uncredited)
- The Lone Rider Rides On (1941) – Sue Brown
- Maisie Was a Lady (1941) – House Guest (uncredited)
- Country Fair (1941) – (uncredited)
- The Lone Rider in Frontier Fury (1941) – Georgia Deering
- Dr. Jekyll and Mr. Hyde (1941) – Mrs. Arnold (uncredited)
- Unfinished Business (1941) – Woman (uncredited)
- Married Bachelor (1941) – Hillary Gordon (uncredited)
- Two-Faced Woman (1941) – Dress Shop Clerk Hotel-Caller (uncredited)
- Mr. and Mrs. North (1942) – Party Guest (uncredited)
- Sleepytime Gal (1942) – Railroad Station Blonde (uncredited)
- To the Shores of Tripoli (1942) – Parade Spectator (uncredited)
- Ship Ahoy (1942) – Hillary (uncredited)
- Calling Dr. Gillespie (1942) – Mrs. Brown (uncredited)
- Wake Island (1942) – Girl at the Inn (uncredited)
- Counter-Espionage (1942) – Pamela Hart
- Sherlock Holmes and the Voice of Terror (1942) – Jill Grandis – Driver (uncredited)
- Happy Go Lucky (1943) – Wife (uncredited)
- The Crystal Ball (1943) – Friend of Jo Ainsley (uncredited)
- Sherlock Holmes Faces Death (1943) – Sally Musgrave
- Jane Eyre (1943) – Blanche Ingram
- Standing Room Only (1944) – Alice Todd
- Lady in the Dark (1944) – Miss Bar (uncredited)
- And the Angels Sing (1944) – Polish Bride (uncredited)
- Practically Yours (1944) – (uncredited)
- Ministry of Fear (1944) – Mrs. Bellane #2
- The Enchanted Cottage (1945) – Beatrice Alexander
- The Crime Doctor's Courage (1945) – Kathleen Carson
- The Woman in Green (1945) – Lydia Marlowe
- Road to Utopia (1946) – Kate
- The Strange Woman (1946) – Meg Saladine
- The Gentleman Misbehaves (1946) – Nina Mallory
- Strange Impersonation (1946) – Arline Cole
- Earl Carroll Sketchbook (1946) – Lynn Stafford
- Big Town (1946) – Lorelei Kilbourne
- Monsieur Beaucaire (1946) – Mme. Pompadour
- Strange Journey (1946) – Patti Leeds
- I Cover Big Town (1947) – Lorelei Kilbourne
- Big Town After Dark (1947) – Lorelei Kilbourn
- Let's Live Again (1948) – Sandra Marlowe
- The Fuller Brush Man (1948) – Mildred Trist
- Big Town Scandal (1948) – Lorelei Kilbourne
- Africa Screams (1949) – Diana Emerson
- Alimony (1949) – Linda Waring
- Bodyhold (1949) – Flo Woodbury
- Unmasked (1950) – Doris King Jackson
- Beauty on Parade (1950) – Gloria Barton
- Lucky Losers (1950) – 'Countess' Margo
- The Admiral Was a Lady (1950) – Shirley Pedigrew
- Vendetta (1950) – Lydia Nevil
- Insurance Investigator (1951) – Addie Wilson
- Skipalong Rosenbloom (1951) – Square Deal Sal
- Lost Continent (1951) – Marla Stevens
- Confidence Girl (1952) – Mary Webb
- Abbott and Costello Meet Captain Kidd (1952) – Capt. Bonney
- Never Wave at a WAC (1953) – First Lt. Phyllis Turnbull
- The Lady Wants Mink (1953) – Evelyn Cantrell
- Invaders From Mars (1953) – Mrs. Mary MacLean
- The Maze (1953) – Peggy Lord
- Mexican Manhunt (1953) – Eve Carter
- The House Across the Lake (1954, aka Heat Wave) – Carol Forrest
- Dragon's Gold (1954)
- Bengazi (1955) – Nora Nielson
- The Man Who Knew Too Much (1956) – Jan Peterson
- Spoilers of the Forest (1957) – Phyllis Warren
