= Ana Paula Höfling =

American dancer and academic

- Education: Royal Academy of Dance
- Occupations: Dancer, dance scholar, academic, and capoeirista
- Career
- Dances: Classical ballet
- Education: University of California, Berkeley; University of Hawaii at Manoa; University of California, Los Angeles

Ana Paula Höfling is an American dancer, dance scholar, academic, and capoeirista.

== Education and training ==
Höfling began dancing as a child and trained in classical ballet at the Royal Academy of Dance. She has a Bachelor of Arts in linguistics from the University of California, Berkeley, a master of fine arts in dance from the University of Hawaii at Manoa, and a Master of Arts in dance and a PhD in Culture and Performance Studies from the University of California, Los Angeles.

Höfling studied capoiera with Mestre Acordeon, Mestre João Grande, Mestre Jogo de Dentro and the Grupo Semente do Jogo de Angola.

== Career ==
Höfling served on the faculty at Wesleyan University, where she was an Andrew Mellon postdoctoral fellow, and at the University of Wyoming. She was an IIE Fulbright scholar at the Academia Superior de Artes de Bogotá in Colombia.

In May 2015 she published some of her research in the book Performing Brazil: Essays on Culture, Identity, and the Performing Arts. She authored the book Staging Brazil: Choreographies of Capoeira, as part of her academic research, which analyzed the role of capoeira and its practitioners in establishing a national culture of Brazil and the globalization of capoeira. Her research focuses on issues of race, class, and authorship within capoeira and Afro-Brazilian culture. Höfling has also researched representations of mesticagem in 20th century ballet in Rio de Janeiro and choreographic productions of Eros Volúsia, Mercedes Baptista, and Felicitas Barreto. She has also contributed chapters to the book Axé Bahia: The Power of Art in an Afro-Brazilian Metropolis. Her research has been published in the Routledge Encyclopedia of Modernism, the Brazilian Journal on Presence Studies, and the Journal for the Anthropological Study of Human Movement.

She is a member of the Dance Studies Association, the Brazilian Studies Association, and the Latin American Studies Association. She currently serves on the faculty at the University of North Carolina at Greensboro as an assistant professor of dance studies and as an Honors College teacher. In the spring of 2019 she was appointed as the director of graduate studies for the UNCG School of Dance.
