= Carlota de Camargo Nascimento =

Brazilian sculptor and poet

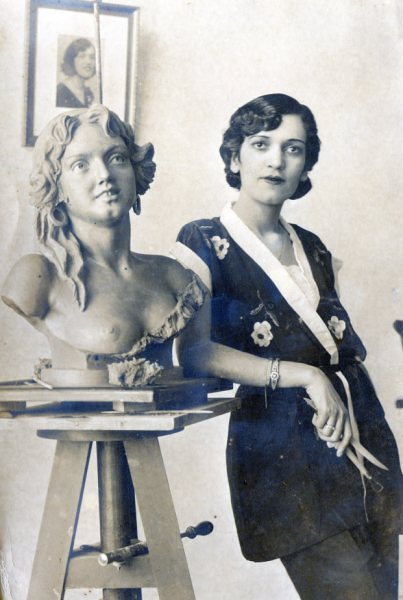
- Carlota de Camargo Nascimento and the bust of gipsy (1947)
- Born: October 7, 1904; Aracaju, Sergipe, Brazil
- Died: July 2, 1974 (aged 69); Rio de Janeiro, Brazil
- Education: Escola Nacional de Belas Artes
- Children: 1
- Other name: Loty
- Known for: Sculpture

Carlota de Camargo Nascimento (Loty) (October 7, 1904 – July 2, 1974) was a Brazilian sculptor and poet. She signed her works as Loty. Loty was one of the first female sculptors in Brazil.

== Biography ==
Loty was born in Aracaju, Sergipe, Brazil. She studied in Escola Nacional de Belas Artes under Rodolfo Bernardelli (1852–1931). Loty had one son, Joaquim Carlos de Camargo Costa. She died, aged 69, in Rio de Janeiro.

Loty's name is included in the Brazilian Dictionary of Artists (Dicionário Brasileiro de Artistas Plásticos) and in the bibliography of the Art Exhibitions (Salões de Artes Brasileiros) of the 1930s, 1940s and 1950s.

Loty received the Golden, the Silver and the Bronze Medals of the Salão Nacional de Belas Artes.

In 1931, Loty participated in the Salão of 1931, a fine arts exhibition for modern artists. Its director, Lucio Costa, made these remarks about Loty:

There is a young artist for whom I reserve a special reference for the great effort and admirable proof of talent: it is Carlota de Camargo Nascimento. Carlota is present in the Salon with a painting of a lady, a head of a child, a bust of a yound lady, two nude studies, all build with sobriety and beauty, and perfect knowledge of the technique. She also brought to the Salon two small nude studies enveloped in a very fine feeling, a harmony similar to that with which the French sculptors treat their subject. These are works that force sculpture to go further to more daring experiments, and Carlota should prepare more pieces, in the same vein, but in larger scale for the next Salons. (VIEIRA, Lucia Gouvêa, Salão de 1931. Marco da revelação da arte moderna em nível nacional. Loty

Loty's closest friends included Oswaldo Teixeira, painter and director of Museu Nacional de Belas Artes; the poet Olegário Mariano, who composed the verses for one of her sculptures; Gilka Machado; José Pancetti; and Portuguese sculptor Teixeira Lopes.

== Main works ==
- Jaguarary (1933; inspired in the poem Jaguarary by Olegário Mariano - four verses are at the bottom of the work).
- Cacique (1950) (sold to Uruguay).
- Ritmo Eterno
- Fim da Jornada (1944)
- Banco da Vieira Souto
- Banco da Praça XV
- Meio-dia – worker resting at midday
- Bust of artist Sarah Villela de Figueiredo
- Bust of Bertha Lutz
- Bust of poet Gilka Machado
- Head of Child – son of painter Mário de Murtas
- Bust of Joaquim Carlos
- Bust of Joaquim Carlos.
- Bust of Roma
- Bust of Guimas.
- Bust of Chinese Girl
- Bust of Ludwig van Beethoven
- Christ
- Caricatures in porcelain O Amigo da Onça - Teatro Municipal
- Bust of Franz Liszt

== See also ==
- Núcleo Bernardelli
- Oswaldo Teixeira
- Olegário Mariano
- Gilka Machado
- José Pancetti
- António Teixeira Lopes
- Casa-Museu Teixeira Lopes
- Medalhas de Prata e Ouro no Salão Nacional de Belas Artes (Anos 30 e 50)
