= Mercedes Baptista =

Brazilian ballet dancer

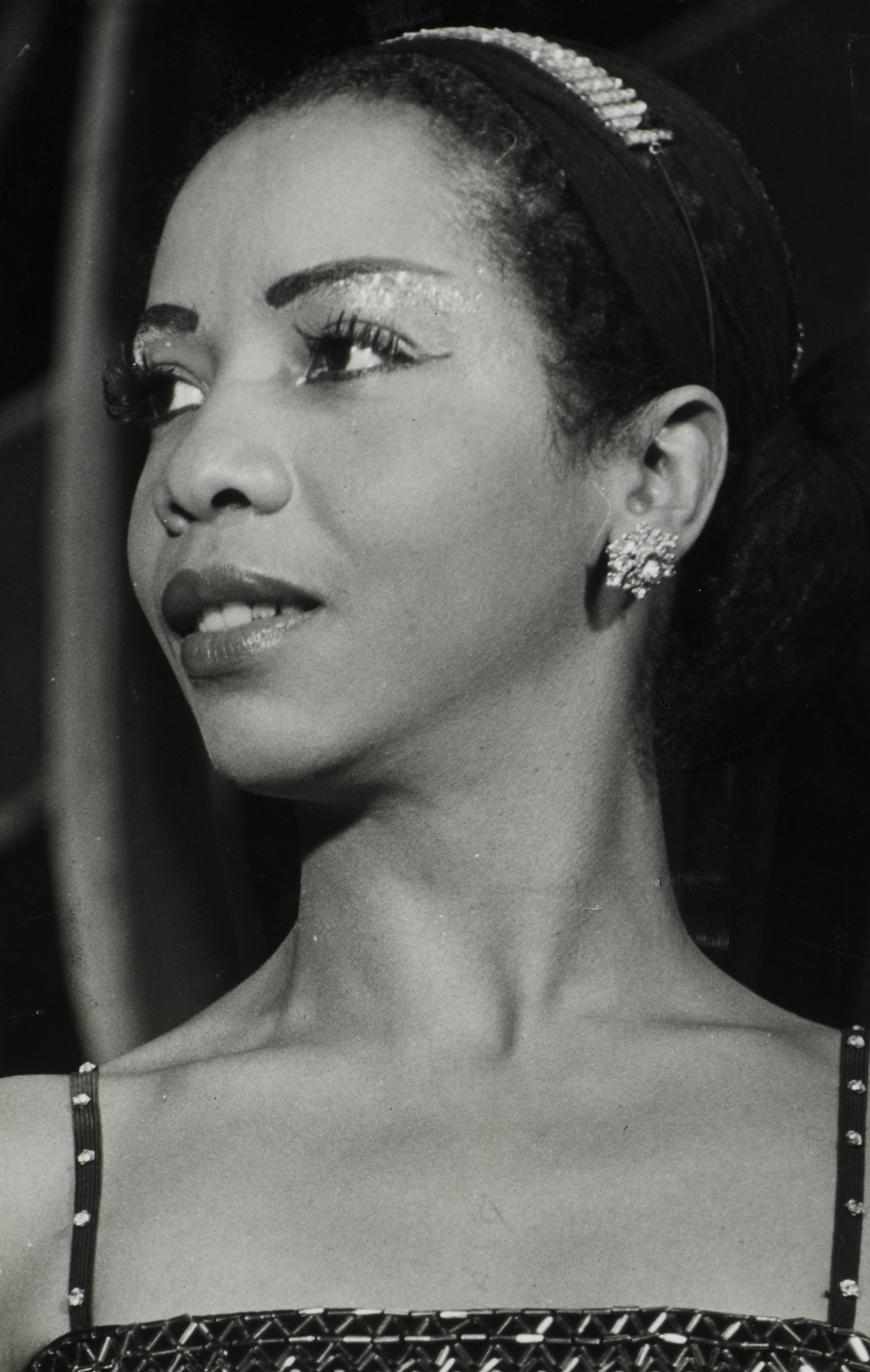
- Born: May 20, 1921; Campos dos Goytacazes, Rio de Janeiro (state), Brazil
- Died: August 19, 2014 (aged 93); Rio de Janeiro
- Occupation(s): ballet dancer, choreographer

Mercedes Ignácia da Silva Krieger, known as Mercedes Batista or Mercedes Baptista (20 May, 1921 — 19 August, 2014) was a Brazilian ballet dancer and choreographer, the first black woman to join Theatro Municipal do Rio de Janeiro's corps de ballet.

Baptista was responsible for the creation of the Afro-Brazilian ballet, inspired by the candomblé terreiros, elaborating a codification and vocabulary proper for these dances.

== Life ==
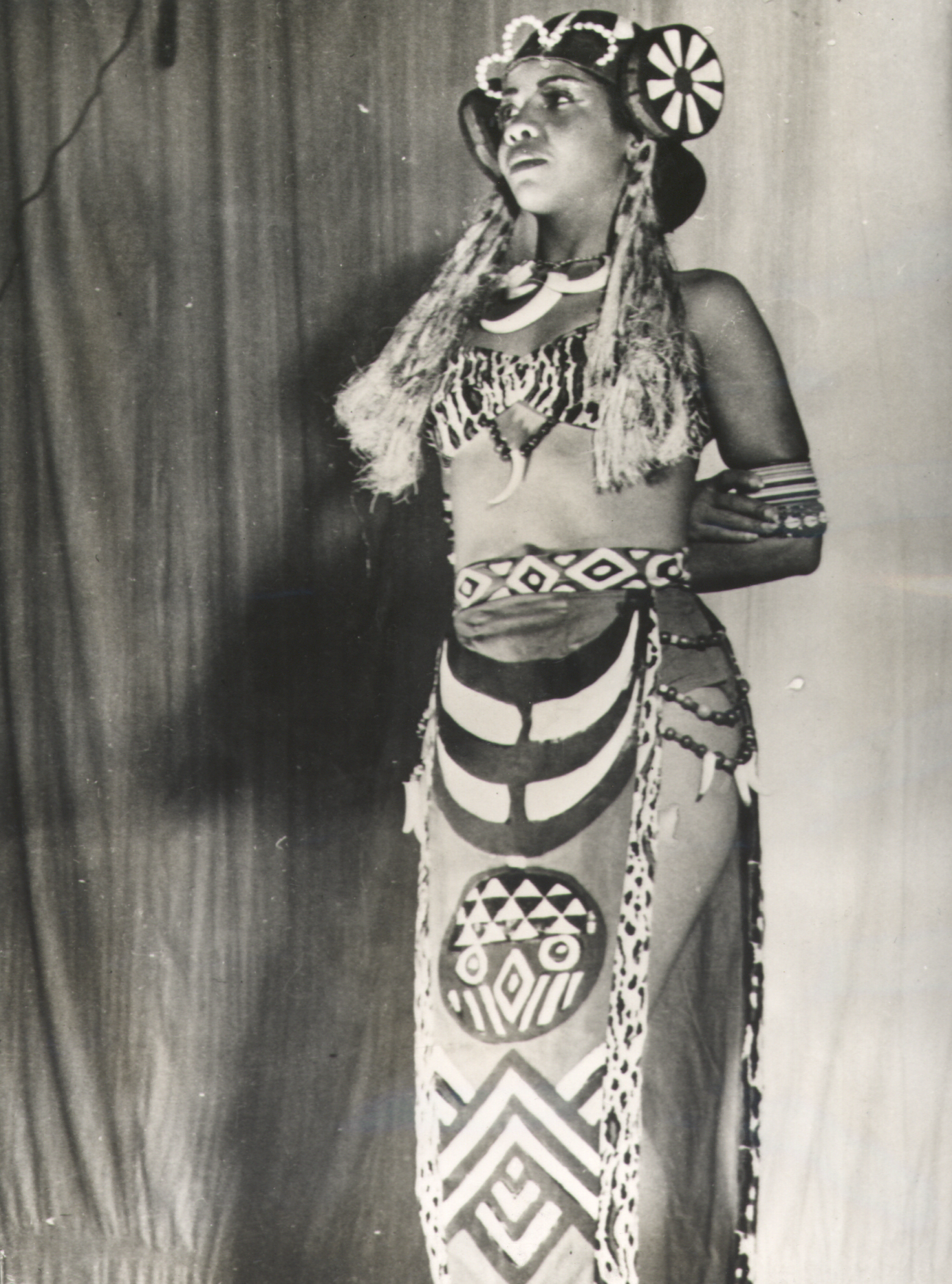
Mercedes Baptista in her Ballet Folclórico, circa 1950. Arquivo Nacional.

Mercedes Batista was born in Campos dos Goytacazes. From a humble background, she moved to Rio de Janeiro, where she had several jobs (among which, she worked as a maid, as a worker in a hat factory, and in a printing), but it was as box office clerk in a movie theater that she had the dream to work in the arts She attended a municipal school at Tijuca neighborhood, Colégio Municipal Homem de Mello.

She began her ballet studies (in 1945) with the dancer Eros Volúsia, then a teacher at the Serviço Nacional de Teatro (National Theater Service); she completed her training at the Theatro Municipal School of Dance (now the Maria Olenewa State Dance School) with the Russian-Brazilian teacher Maria Olenewa and Yuco Linderberg in the 1940s. On March 18, 1948, in a difficult selection test, she was approved to join the ballroom of the Municipal Theater, being the first black woman to obtain it and, along with Raul Soares who also attended this contest, one of the two black people there.

Despite this, she suffered constant discrimination, to the point of not being able to work; in a 1981 interview she stated: "Madeleine Rosay, Vaslav Veltchek, Edy Vasconcelos and Nina Verchinina gave me good career opportunities, without looking at my color. The problems came after that. I got myself excluded of everything and even if I put a doormat covering my face, they would not let me step on the scene. I only once crossed the stage wearing pointed sneakers, and still in the background. " - to which she sought to circumvent, as she said on another occasion: "Everything was always very difficult, but who would assume or make it clear that part of my difficulties was because I was not white? They would never tell me this, or say that the problem was racial, but I knew it was, and so I always struggled every time to try to perfect myself. " She then went to join the Teatro Experimental do Negro as a dancer, then as collaborator and eventually as a choreographer.

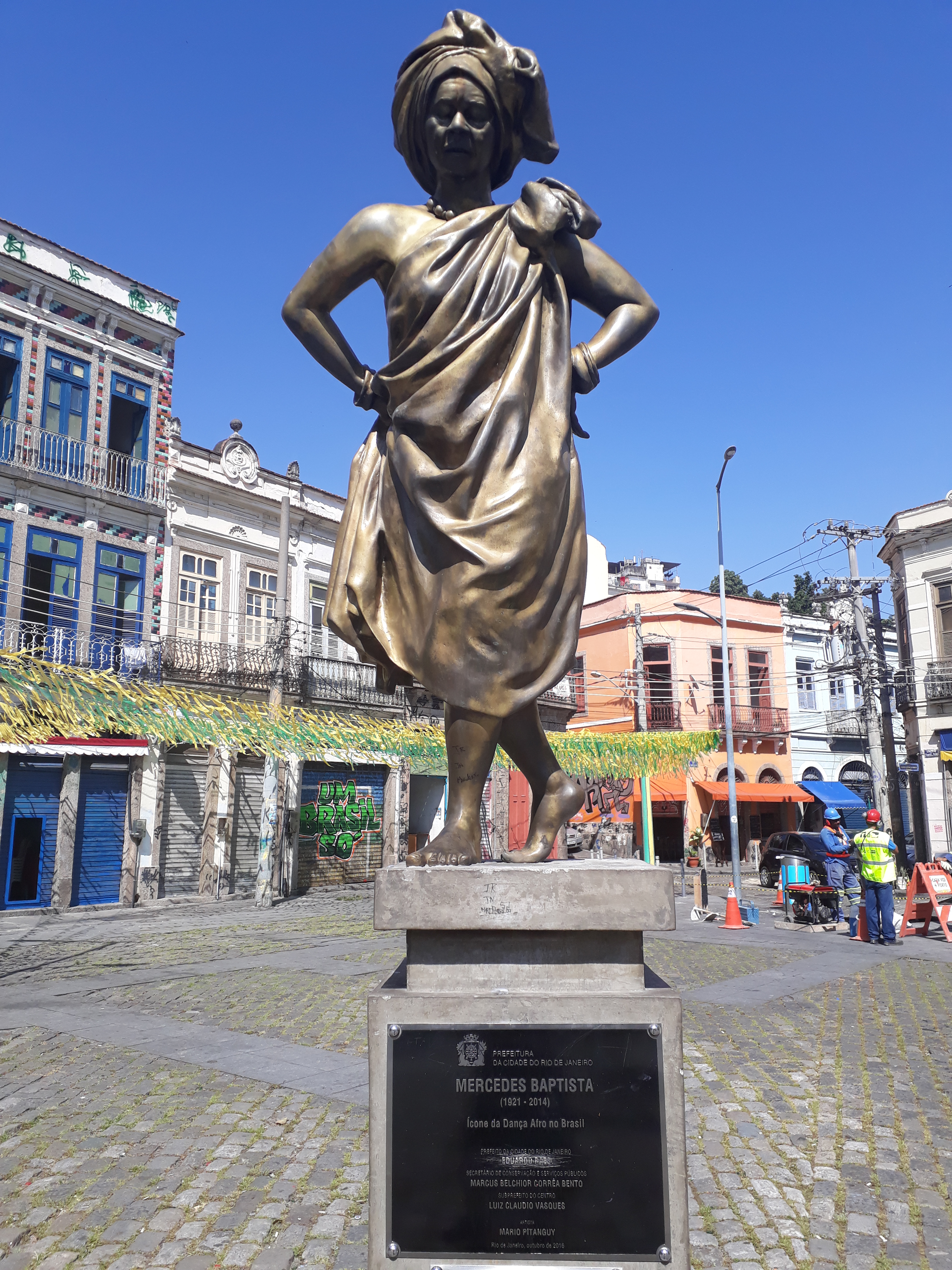
Sculpture of Mercedes Baptista in Rio de Janeiro, byM. Pitanguy.

Invited by choreographer and anthropologist Katherine Dunham, creator of the first all-African-American modern dance company, Baptista went to that country where she took classes in modern dance and took part in the civil rights movement.

Back in Brazil, she founded the Ballet Folclórico Mercedes Baptista, dedicated to the formation of black dancers, who researched and incorporated Afro-Brazilian culture into their work and movements, gaining prominence in the artistic scene and touring throughout Europe and Latin America.

In 1963 she elaborated the choreography of the samba school Acadêmicos do Salgueiro, and pioneered in its comissão de frente elements of classical dance."

== Death ==
Suffering from diabetes and heart problems, Mercedes died at the age of 93 in the retirement home where she lived in the Copacabana neighborhood, and her body was cremated at the Memorial do Carmo.

== Homages ==
Baptista was honored by Rio samba schools Acadêmicos do Cubango, in 2008, and Unidos de Vila Isabel, in 2009.

She was the subject of a documentary film in 2007, Balé de Pé no Chão – A dança afro de Mercedes Baptista, directed by Lílian Sola Santiago and Marianna Monteiro.

In 2016 a sculpture of her was erected at Rio's port zone, sculpted by Mario Pitanguy.

== Bibliography ==
- Mercedes Baptista: a criação da identidade negra na dança, Paulo Melgaço, Fundação Cultural Palmares, 2007.
