= Rio Rita (1942 film) =

1942 comedy film directed by S. Sylvan Simon

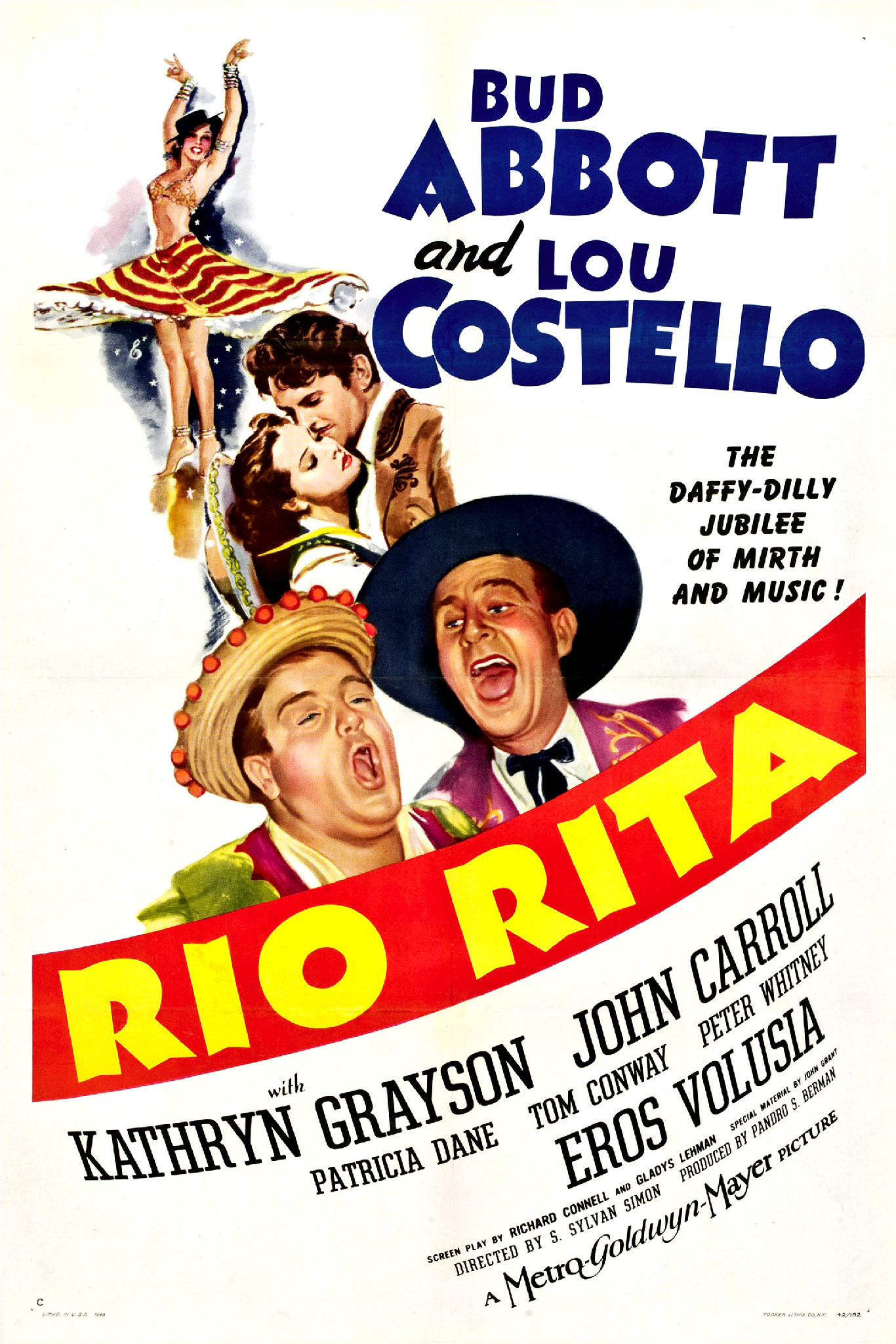
- Theatrical Poster
- Directed by: S. Sylvan Simon
- Written by: Richard Connell; Gladys Lehman; John Grant
- Based on: Rio Rita by Guy Bolton and Frederick A. Thompson
- Produced by: Pandro Berman
- Starring: Bud Abbott; Lou Costello; Kathryn Grayson; John Carroll
- Cinematography: George J. Folsey
- Edited by: Ben Lewis
- Music by: Score: Herbert Stothart; Songs: Harold Arlen (music); Yip Harburg (lyrics)
- Distributed by: Metro-Goldwyn-Mayer
- Release date: March 11, 1942
- Running time: 91 minutes
- Country: United States
- Language: English
- Budget: $900,000
- Box office: $3,220,000

Rio Rita is a 1942 American comedy film directed by S. Sylvan Simon and starring Abbott and Costello. It was based upon the 1927 Flo Ziegfeld Broadway musical, which was previously made into a 1929 film also titled Rio Rita that starred the comedy team of Wheeler & Woolsey. Kathryn Grayson (in her first starring picture) and John Carroll replace the 1929 version's Bebe Daniels and John Boles.

== Plot ==
Nazi spies have infiltrated the Hotel Vista del Rio, a resort on the Mexican border. They plan to use a radio broadcast by a famous guest, Ricardo Montera, to transmit coded messages to their cohorts. Doc and Wishy are stowaways in Montera's car, who steal a basket of "apples" that turn out being miniature radios used by the spies. Rita Winslow, the hotel's owner and childhood sweetheart of Montera, hire Doc and Wishy as house detectives, who discover the Nazi codebook and give it to Montera. They are then kidnapped by the spies, and left in a room with a bomb set to explode, but manage to escape while Wishy plants the bomb in the pocket of one of the culprits. Meanwhile, the broadcast has already begun and Montera, refusing to participate in treason, fights the spies until the Texas Rangers arrive. The spies' escape by car is thwarted when the planted bomb finally explodes.

== Cast ==
- Bud Abbott as 'Doc'
- Lou Costello as 'Wishy'
- Kathryn Grayson as Rita Winslow
- John Carroll as Ricardo Montera
- Patricia Dane as Lucette Brunswick
- Tom Conway as Maurice Craindall
- Peter Whitney as Jake
- Barry Nelson as Harry Gantley
- Arthur Space as Trask
- Dick Rich as Gus
- Eva Puig as Marianna
- Joan Valerie as Dotty
- Mitchell Lewis as Julio
- Eros Volusia as herself
- Norman Abbott as Hotel Laundry Boy
- King Baggot as Hotel Guest

== Production ==
Rio Rita was the first of three films that Abbott and Costello made on loan to Metro-Goldwyn-Mayer while under contract to Universal Pictures; the other two pictures being Lost in a Harem and Abbott and Costello in Hollywood.

Filming of Rio Rita began on November 10, 1941 and concluded January 14, 1942 and included location shooting near Palm Springs, California.

During production of Rio Rita, Abbott and Costello had their hand and footprints enshrined at Grauman's Chinese Theater on December 8, 1941. The team also signed a new agreement regarding their partnership on January 9, 1942. Costello would now earn 60 percent of their salary with Abbott taking 40 percent.

Joe Kirk, who later played Mr. Bacciagalupe in The Abbott and Costello Show, has a small role. (Kirk later became Costello's brother-in-law).

== Reception ==
The film earned $1,927,000 in the US and Canada and $1,293,000 elsewhere during its initial theatrical release, making MGM a profit of $1,340,000.

== Home media ==
This film, along with Abbott and Costello Meet Captain Kidd, were released on DVD on April 1, 2011 through the Warner Archive Collection.
