= Samba da Vida =

1937 film directed by Luiz de Barros

- Directed by: Luiz de Barros
- Screenplay by: Gilberto de Andrade; Luiz de Barros
- Based on: Frederico Segundo, by Eurico Silva
- Produced by: Adhemar Gonzaga
- Starring: Jaime Costa; Manoelino Teixeira; Pinto Filho
- Cinematography: Edgar Brasil
- Music by: Waldemar Henrique
- Production company: Cinédia
- Release date: 25 October 1937
- Running time: 105 minutes
- Country: Brazil
- Language: Portuguese

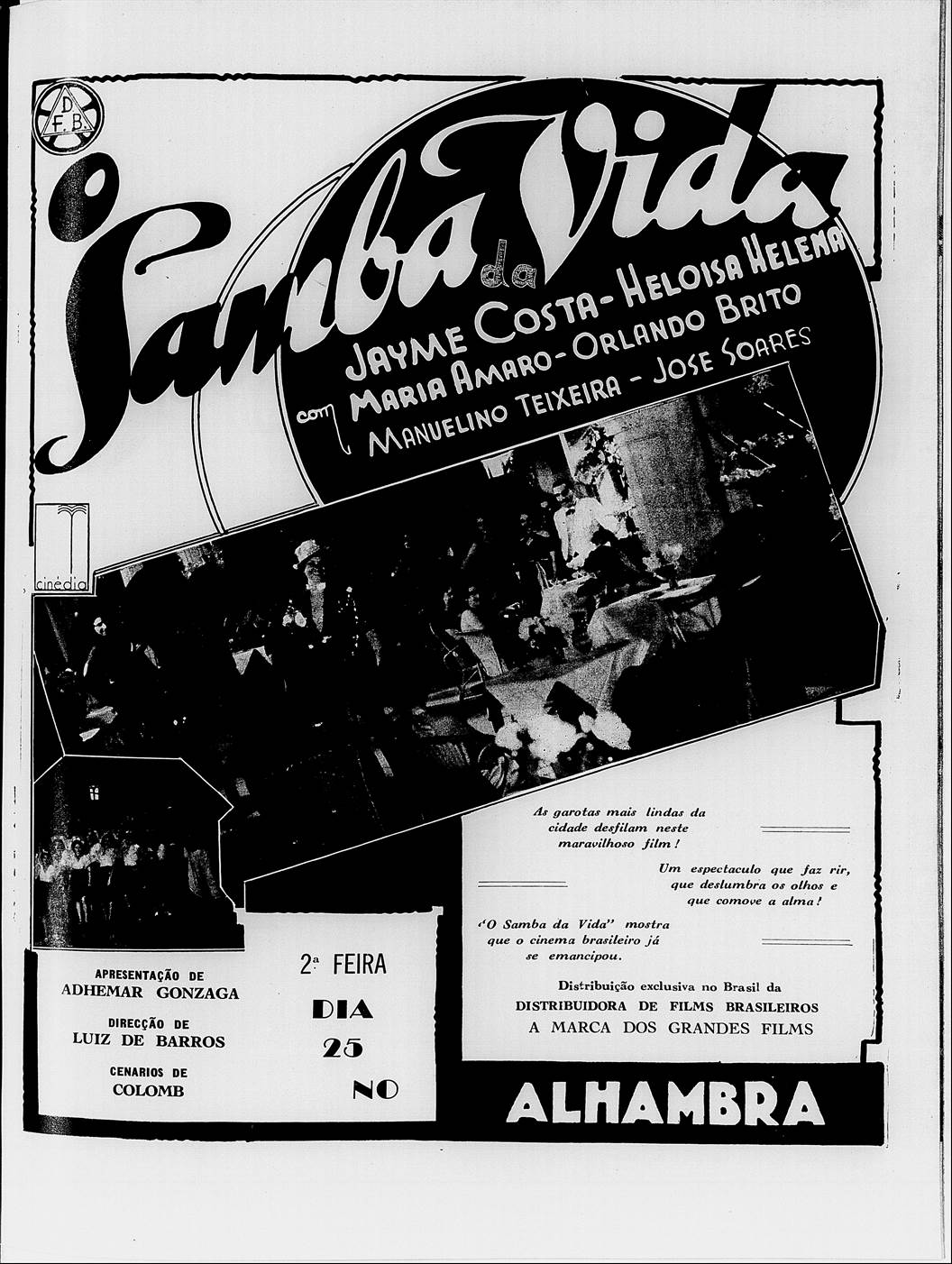
Poster for Samba da Vida

Samba da Vida is a 1937 Brazilian film produced by Adhemar Gonzaga and directed by Luiz de Barros. The film is based on the play Frederico Segundo, by Eurico Silva.

== Cast ==
Actor actress	Role
Jayme Costa	Pedro Paulo
Heloísa Helena	Helena
Ítala Ferreira	Martiniana Ludovico
Belmira de Almeida	Matilde
Rodolfo Mayer	Rodolfo
Edmundo Maia	Coronel Frederico II
Orlando Brito	Carlos
Wilson Porto	Frederico Pinhões
Manoel Rocha	Detetive Rodrigo Fonseca
Maria Amaro	Geni
Manoelino Teixeira	João
Lu Marival	
Eros Volúsia	
