= Olegário Mariano =

Brazilian poet and politician

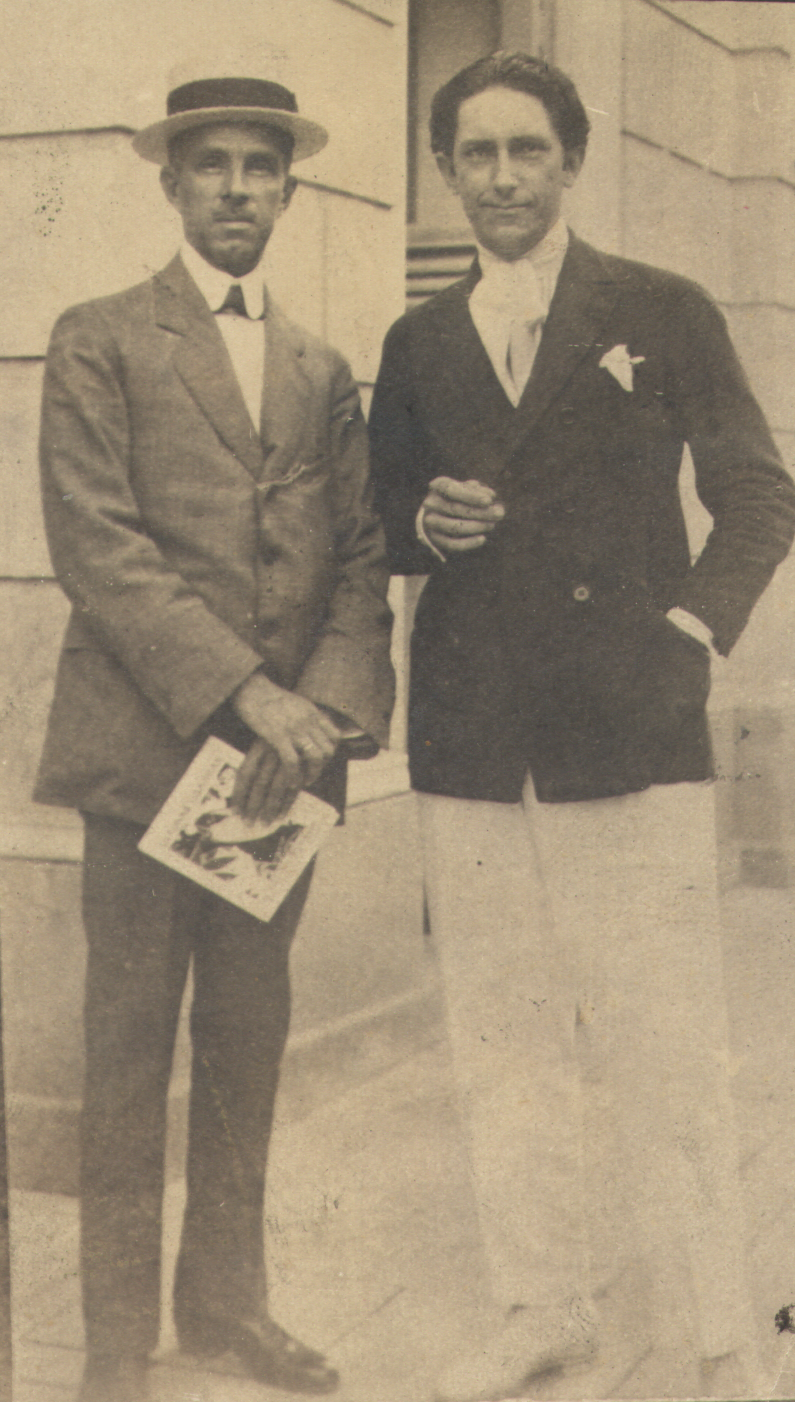
Mário de Alencar and Olegário Mariano (1909).

Olegário Mariano Carneiro da Cunha (Recife, March 24, 1889 – Rio de Janeiro, November 28, 1958) was a Brazilian poet, politician, and diplomat. He was a cousin of the poet Manuel Bandeira (1886-1968).

== Biography ==
Olegário Mariano was the son of José Mariano Carneiro da Cunha and his wife, Olegária da Costa Gama, both supporters of Abolition and the Republic.

He was an inspector of secondary education and a theatre censor. In 1918 he was Brazil’s representative in the Melo Franco Mission, as embassy secretary in Bolivia. He was a deputy to the Constituent Assembly of 1934. In 1937 he held a seat in the Chamber of Deputies, then he was Minister Plenipotentiary at the Centenaries of Portugal in 1940; delegate of the Brazilian Academy of Letters at the Inter-Academic Conference in Lisbon for the Orthographic Agreement of 1945; Brazilian ambassador to Portugal between 1953 and 1954. He held the position of officer of the 4th Real Estate Registry Office in Rio de Janeiro, having previously been a notary public.

In 1938, in a contest promoted by the magazine Fon-Fon, he was elected Prince of Brazilian Poets, replacing Alberto de Oliveira, who held the title after the death of Olavo Bilac, the first to obtain it. In the magazines Careta and Para Todos, he wrote under the pseudonym João da Avenida, a section of worldly chronicles in humorous verses. He became known as "the poet of the cicadas", because of one of his favorite themes.

== Works ==
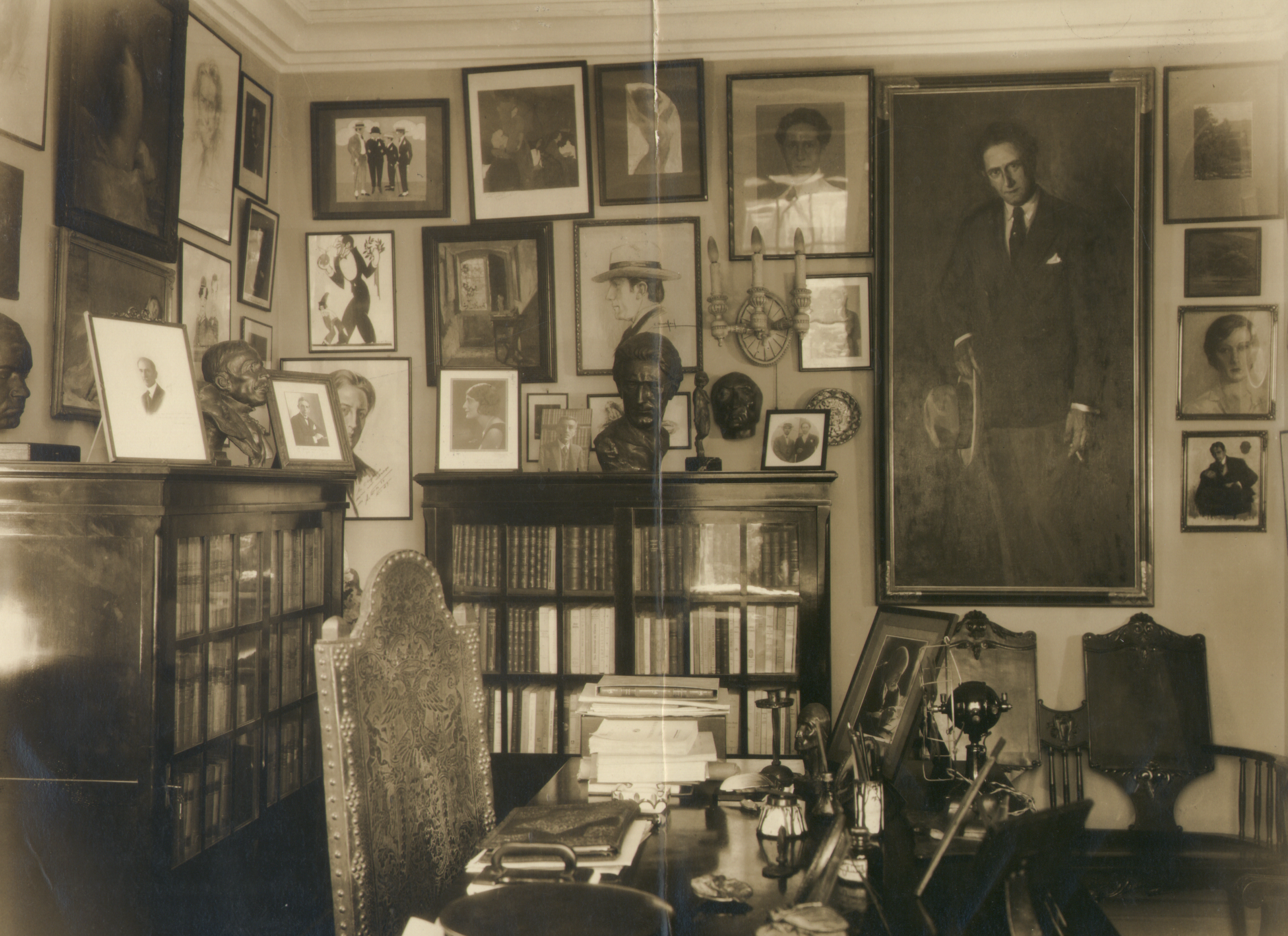
Olegário Mariano's office.

- Angelus (1911)
- Sonetos (1921)
- Evangelho da sombra e do silêncio (1913)
- Água corrente, com uma carta prefácio de Olavo Bilac (1917)
- Últimas Cigarras (1915)
- Castelos na areia (1922)
- Cidade Maravilhosa (1922)
- Bataclan, crônicas em verso (1927)
- Canto da minha terra (1931)
- Destino (1931)
- Poemas de amor e de saudade (1932)
- Teatro (1932)
- Antologia de tradutores (1932)
- Poesias escolhidas (1932)
- O amor na poesia brasileira (1933)
- Vida Caixa de brinquedos, crônicas em verso (1933)
- O enamorado da vida, com prefácio de Júlio Dantas (1937)
- Abolição da escravatura e os homens do norte, conference (1939)
- Em louvor da língua portuguesa (1940)
- A vida que já vivi, memórias (1945)
- Quando vem baixando o crepúsculo (1945)
- Cantigas de encurtar caminho (1949)
- Tangará conta histórias, children's poetry (1953)
- Toda uma vida de poesia, 2 vol. (1957)

== Brazilian Academy of Letters ==
He was elected on December 23, 1926, to chair number 21 of the Brazilian Academy of Letters.

== Decorations ==
- Commander of the Military Order of Saint James of the Sword of Portugal (March 28, 1935)
- Grand Officer of the Military Order of Christ of Portugal (August 5, 1940)
- Grand Officer of the Military Order of Saint James of the Sword of Portugal (August 24, 1945)
