= Madeleine Rosay =

Brazilian ballet dancer and TV presenter

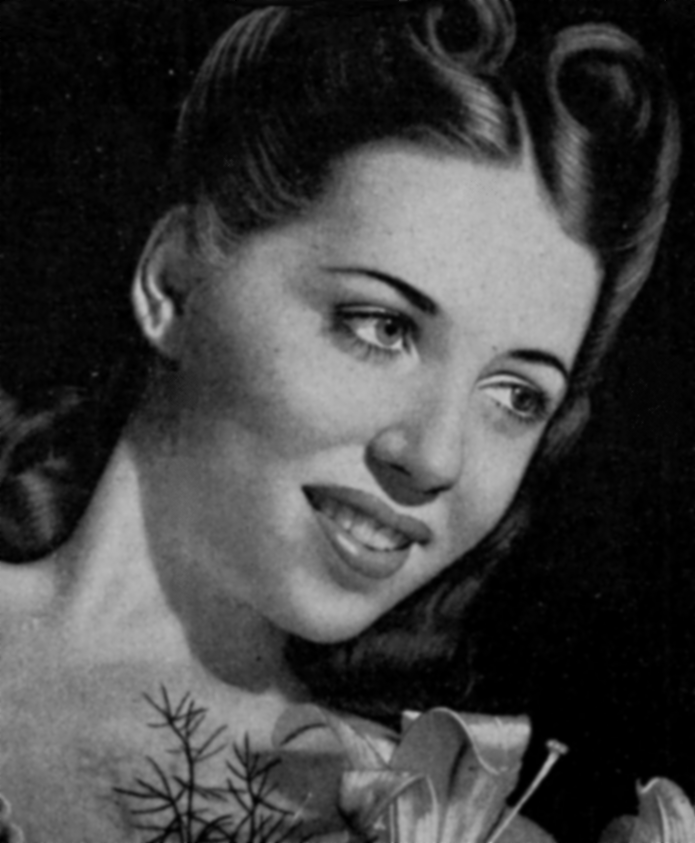
- Rosay in 1942
- Born: Magdalena Rosenzveig; 12 October 1923; Rio de Janeiro, Brazil
- Died: July 28, 1996 (aged 72); Rio de Janeiro, Brazil

Signature
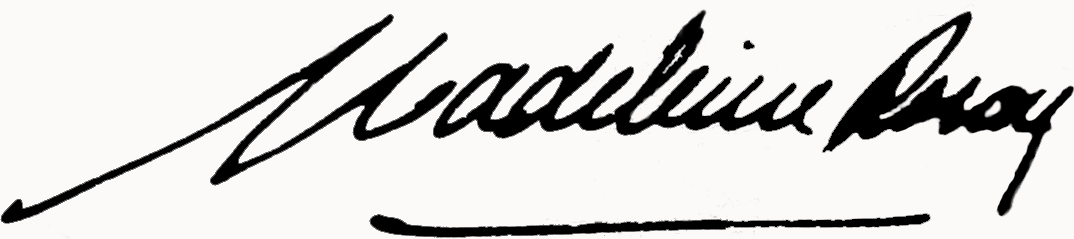

Madeleine Rosay, born Magdalena Rosenzveig (12 October 1924 – 28 July 1996), was a Brazilian ballet dancer and TV presenter.

== Life ==
Rosay was born in Rio de Janeiro in 1923 to Polish Jewish parents, David Rosenzveig and Jeannette Kohn. She started to learn to dance at the age of seven under Maria Olinewa. Within four years she was a member of the Theatro Municipal's Academy of Ballet's as a salaried dancer. Her parents were not keen that when she became a professional ballet dancer but they agreed to her arguments of how artistic it was. She was a prima ballerina at the age of fifteen.

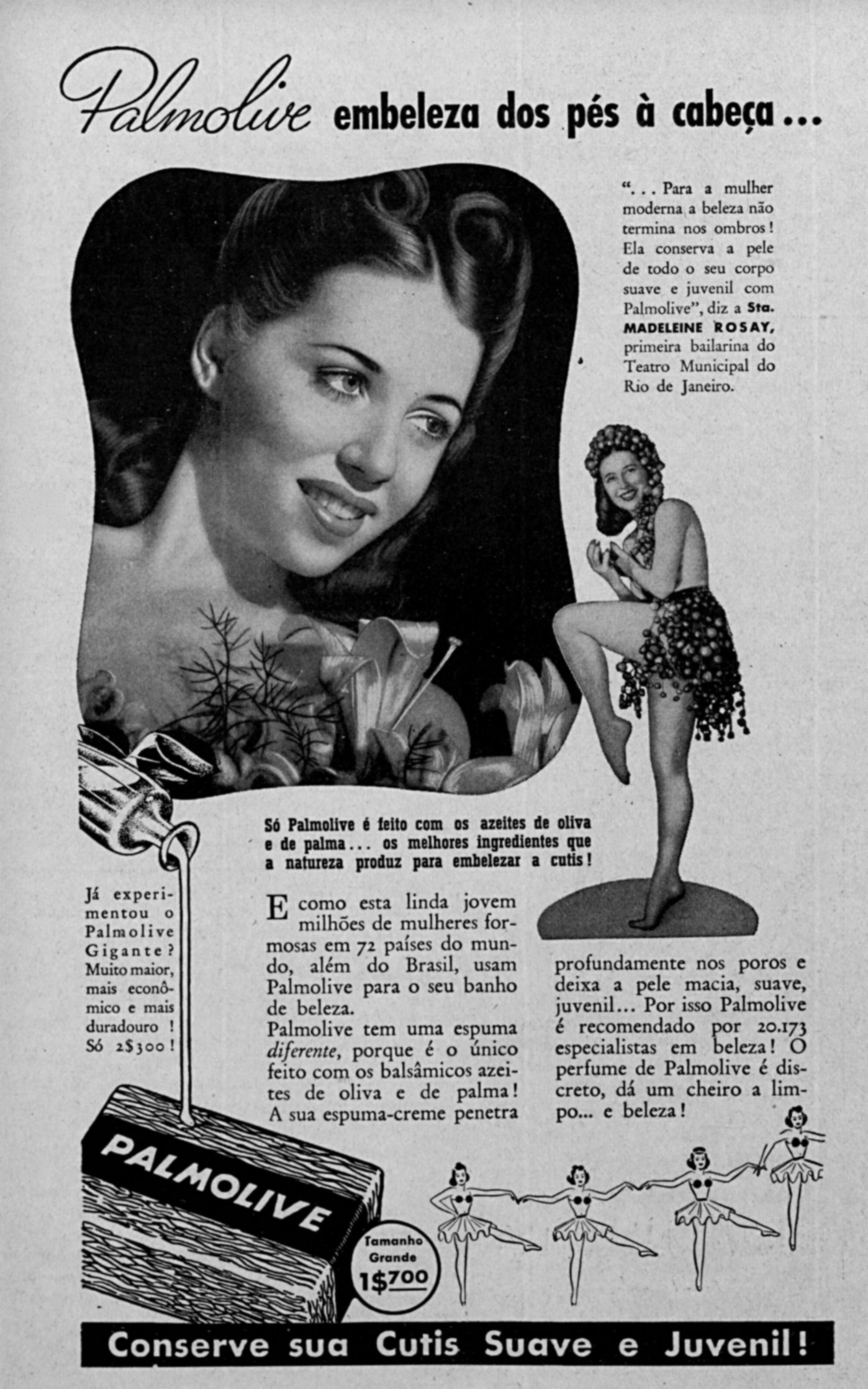
1942 soap advert

She went on to teach at the Theatro Municipal where her students included the singer Sylvia Telles. In 1942 she appeared in an advertisement for Palmolive soap.

In 1947 she married and her husband objected to her dancing. Rosay created a new career in television. She went on to host a version of "What's My Line" which was called "Guess what it does" and it started in Brazil in 1953. She was later the presenter of the programme "Break the Bank".

== Legacy ==
There is a ballet school in Brazil which is named for Rosay.

== Films ==
- Bonequinha de Seda (1936)
- Querida Suzana (1947)
- Vamos com Calma (1956)
