= Gilka Machado =

Brazilian poet and political activist

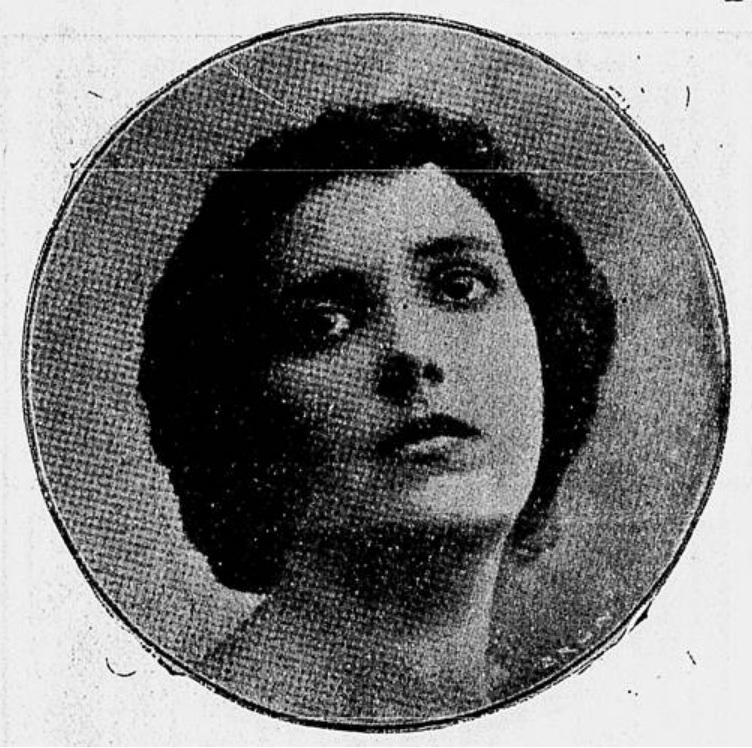
Gilka Machado (1917)

Gilka Machado (1893–1980) was a Brazilian poet and political activist. She became known as one of the first women to write erotic poetry in Brazil; her work is usually classified as symbolist. Machado was also one of the founders of the Partido Republicano Feminino (Women's Republican Party) in 1910, which advocated for the women's right to vote.

== Life ==
Machado was born in 1893, in Rio de Janeiro. She started to write poetry as a child. At age 14 she participated of a literary contest held by the newspaper A Imprensa, winning the three main prizes with poems under her name and pseudonyms. The critics were scandalized by her poems, calling her an "immoral matron".

Her first book of poems, Cristais partidos, was published in 1915. The book was prefaced by Olavo Bilac. The following years, she published the books: A revelação dos perfumes (1916), Estado de alma (1917), Poesias (1915-1917)- (1918) and Mulher Nua, in 1922.

In 1933 she won a contest by the magazine O Malho as the greatest Brazilian woman poet of the 20th century.

== Personal life ==
In 1910, Gilka Machado married the poet Rodolfo de Melo Machado (1885-1923), with whom she had two children, Hélios and Heros. Heros would become known as the dancer Eros Volúsia.

As an adult, she supported her family by working for the Rio Railway Company.

== Works ==
- Cristais partidos [Broken Crystals], 1915
- A revelação dos perfumes [A Revelation of Perfumes], 1916
- Estado de alma [Condition of the Soul], 1917
- Poesias (1915-1917) [Poems (1915-1917)], 1918
- Mulher nua [Naked Woman], 1922
- Meu glorioso pecado [My Glorious Sin], 1928
- Sublimação [Sublimation], 1938
- Velha poesia, 1965
