= Eros Volúsia =

Brazilian dancer and actress (1914–2004)

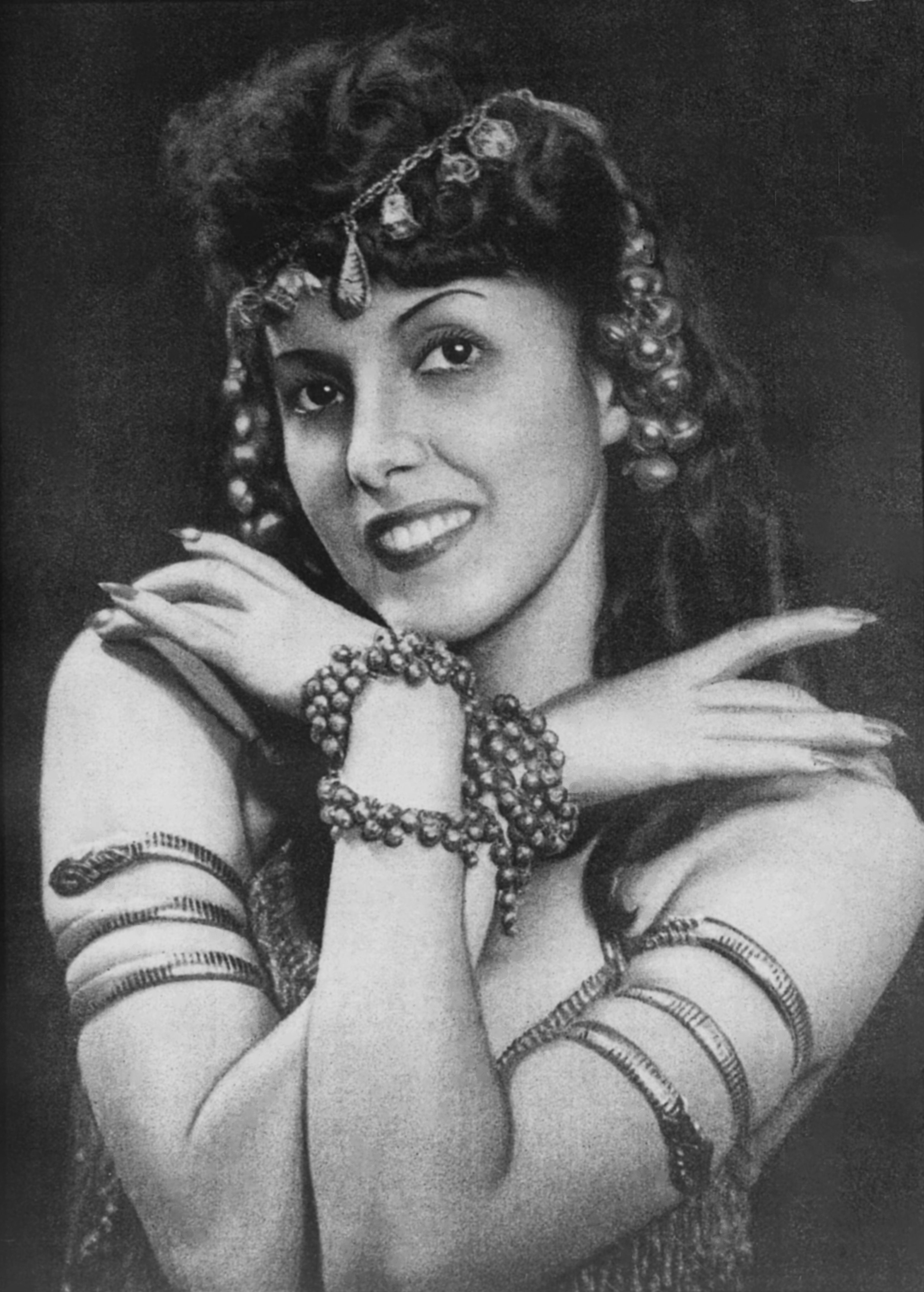
- Eros Volúsia as Salome (1943)
- Born: Heros Volúsia Machado; June 1, 1914; Rio de Janeiro, Brazil
- Died: January 1, 2004 (aged 89)
- Occupation(s): Dancer, actress
- Parent: Gilka Machado Rodolfo Machado

Heros Machado (1 June 1914 – 1 January 2004), known as Eros Volúsia was a Brazilian dancer and actress. Her dancing style blended classical ballet to Afro-Brazilian dancing traditions.

Volúsia participated in several movies in Brazil and Hollywood, among them the 1942 film Rio Rita, starring Abbott and Costello.

== Biography ==
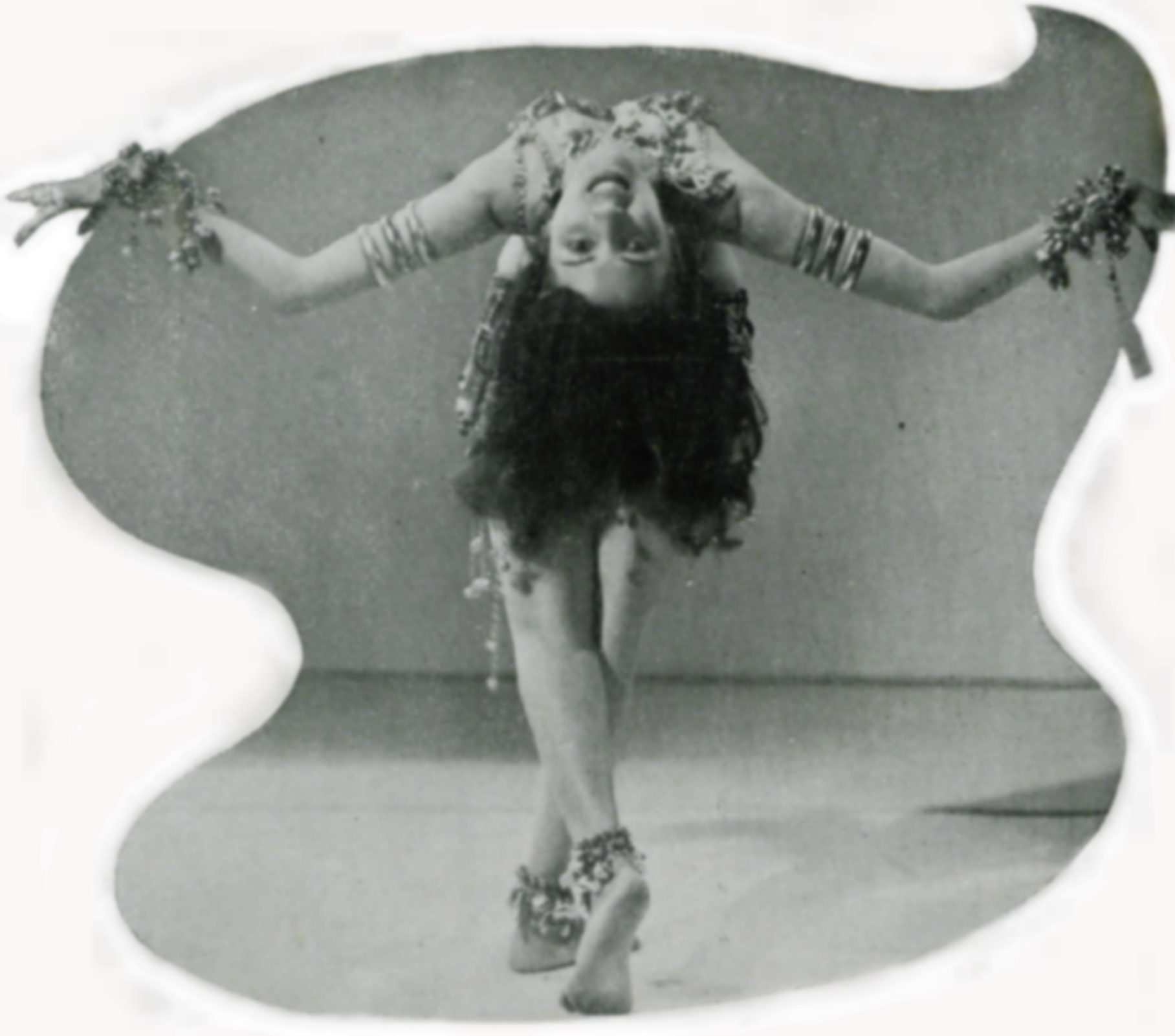
Volúsia posing in an advertisement

Volúsia was born in Rio de Janeiro, in 1914; her parents were the poets Gilka Machado and Rodolfo Machado. Volúsia entered the ballet school in 1928, where she studied under Maria Olenewa. She also attended the umbanda terreiro of João da Luz, where she had her first contact with Afro-Brazilian dances.

In 1929, Volúsia made her first presentation at Theatro Municipal, dancing samba barefooted. She would make another presentations in the following years, invited by cultural salonists like Paschoal Carlos Magno. In the spirit of Brazilian modernism Volúsia researched Amerindian and African dances in order to create a "national dance" (bailado nacional).

In 1935 she participated of her first Brazilian film, Favela dos Meus Amores. She would be featured in other four films in Brazil.

On 22 September 1941 she was featured at the cover of Life magazine. The following year she participated in a musical act in the MGM film Rio Rita, with Abbott and Costello. She would be compared to Carmen Miranda by local media.

== Filmography ==
Year	Title	Role	Notes
1935	Favela dos Meus Amores		
1937	Samba da Vida		
1942	Rio Rita	Eros Volusia	
1943	Caminho do Céu		
1944	Romance Proibido	dancer	
1949	Pra Lá de Boa		(final film role)
