= List of Wild Kratts episodes =

Wild Kratts is a Canadian live-action/animated educational children's television series created by Chris and Martin Kratt. The Kratt Brothers Company and 9 Story Media Group produce the series, which is presented by PBS Kids in the United States and by TVOKids in Canada. The show's aim is to educate children about biology, zoology, and ecology, and teach kids small ways to make big impacts. It has ties to the Kratts' previous shows, Kratts' Creatures and Zoboomafoo, and contains numerous characters from the latter.

In the series, the animated Kratts' brothers encounter wild animals during stories of adventure and mystery. This program is the longest lasting series created by the Kratt brothers, lasting for over a decade after the respective 3-month and 2-year runs of the two previous series.

== Series overview ==
Season	Episodes	Originally released	
Season	Episodes	First released	Last released
1	40	January 3, 2011	October 25, 2012
2	26	October 15, 2012	January 31, 2014
3	26	April 7, 2014	July 22, 2015
4	26	July 29, 2015	April 14, 2017
5	20	July 24, 2017	January 23, 2019
6	20	April 15, 2019	July 12, 2021
7	20	May 22, 2023	January 18, 2027

== Episodes ==
=== Season 1 (2011–2012) ===
No. overall	No. in season	Title	Directed by	Written by	Country/region	Animals	Original release date	Prod. code
1	1	"Mom of a Croc"	Chris Kratt	Chris Kratt	Nile River (Uganda)	Nile crocodile, hippopotamus, Nile monitor, African softshell turtle, marabou stork, honey badger	January 3, 2011	101
At the Nile River, zoologists Chris and Martin Kratt are on a mission to show one of their fellow Wild Kratts team members—brilliant young inventor Aviva Corcovado—that there's more to crocodiles than just violence and snapping jaws. After shrinking themselves down to a few inches tall by using Aviva's Miniaturizer invention, the Kratt brothers disguise themselves as crocodile eggs and sneak into a mother crocodile's new nest. In the Wild Kratts team's turtle-shaped aircraft and headquarters—the Tortuga, one of Aviva's greatest inventions—the Wild Kratts tech team, consisting of Aviva, communications expert and mechanic Koki, and skilled pilot Jimmy Z monitor Chris and Martin and watch as the mother crocodile faithfully guards her nest against predators for months without even eating anything. Eventually, as the crocodile eggs hatch and the crocodile mom uses her mouth to carry several of her newly hatched babies to the river, Aviva changes her mind about crocodiles and decides that these reptiles are in fact caring and dedicated mothers. But when the mother crocodile leaves the river to go get more hatchlings from her nest, predators threaten the first batch of baby crocodiles. The Kratt brothers must use the incredible Creature Power Suits—two of Aviva's inventions—to gain the abilities of crocodiles and protect the vulnerable crocodile hatchlings. Animal names: Crocodilla, Chompella (formerly Chomp), Crunchina (formerly Crunch), Jawsana (formerly Jaws), Munchette (formerly Munch), Snapifer (formerly Snapper), Frederica (formerly Fred)
2	2	"Whale of a Squid"	Martin Kratt	Martin Kratt	Southern Ocean	Sperm whale, giant squid, colossal squid, New Zealand arrow squid, amphipod	January 4, 2011	102
The Kratt brothers use Aviva's amphipod-inspired submersible, the Amphisub, to dive into the deep waters of the Southern Ocean. There, they witness a never-before-seen wildlife moment: a battle between a sperm whale and a giant squid. However, the water pressure at the extreme depths where the battle is taking place badly damages and partially crushes the Amphisub, forcing Aviva to use her new ExtendoArm invention to pull the submersible back to the Tortuga. To allow Chris and Martin to return to the site of the whale-versus-squid battle, Aviva programs two new Creature Power Suits—Sperm Whale Power for Chris, and Squid Power for Martin. The Kratt brothers use their new Creature Powers to dive back into the deep sea, where the sperm whale and the giant squid are still locked in combat. Suddenly, the sperm whale becomes entangled in a discarded fishing net and begins sinking toward an area full of underwater volcanoes. To make matters worse, a colossal squid attacks the sperm whale's calf. Chris and Martin must put their Creature Powers of both sperm whale and squid to good use to rescue the mother sperm whale and her calf. Animal names: Bumper, Squiddo, Squidtacular, Squidsicle, Beaks
3	3	"Aardvark Town"	Chris Kratt	Chris Kratt	Botswana	Aardvark, spotted hyena, common warthog, lion, South African shelduck, African rock python, Cape porcupine, Macrotermes termite, aardwolf	January 5, 2011	103
The Wild Kratts crew travels to Botswana's savanna to create a geological map of all the local aardvark dens, hoping to study the secrets of the rarely seen aardvark. But after a young aardvark accidentally becomes a stowaway in Chris' backpack, the team set off on a search to return him to his home burrow, and find his mother. Along the way, they discover how aardvarks manipulate earth materials to alter landscapes and learn the incredible (and valuable) service this amazing animal provides to all burrow-living creatures of Africa. But after searching hole after hole, the Kratt brothers discover that the aardvark's mother and the other burrowing animals have been kidnapped by the evil inventor, Zach Varmitech, who plans to use the aardvark to dig his pool for him. They manage to stop Zach and return the mama aardvark to "Slurpy" while Zach has a run-in with an angry warthog. Villain of the week: Zach Varmitech Animal name: Slurpy
4	4	"Flight of the Draco"	Martin Kratt	Martin Kratt	Borneo	Draco lizard, sulphur crested cockatoo, Bornean orangutan	January 6, 2011	104
While studying the mysterious Draco lizards of Borneo—one of the few gliding lizards in the world—Chris falls out of a tree and develops a severe fear of heights, forcing Martin to study the lizards alone. But while Chris tries to conquer his fear, the evil fashion designer Donita Donata and her henchman Dabio kidnap all the Draco lizards of the rainforest—and Martin—to create a new fall line of living lizard jewelry, with Martin as their new top male model. To save his brainwashed brother, and all the Draco lizards in the forest, Chris is forced to overcome his fear and don the powers of the gliding lizard. Villains of the week: Donita Donata, Dabio, Zach Varmitech Animal name: Zippy
5	5	"Mystery of the Squirmy Wormy"	Chris Kratt, Martin Kratt	Chris Kratt, Martin Kratt	New York City	Earthworm, American bullfrog, blue jay, American robin, brown thrasher, star-nosed mole, largemouth bass, common raccoon	January 7, 2011	105
Aviva builds the Kratt brothers a new machine, a miniaturizer, allowing them to shrink down to microscopic levels. After a rainstorm, the brothers decide to use it to solve the mystery of why earthworms come up to the surface after a rainstorm. They decide to stage the experiment in Central Park. They then spend the day with an earthworm named Pinky, tunneling underground, and observing the everyday life of a worm. But after their new worm friend is carried off by a bird and left on the sidewalk to die, Chris and Martin race to save the worm before the sun dehydrates her. Animal name: Pinky
6	6	"Platypus Cafe"	Chris Kratt	Chris Kratt	Tributary of the Murray River	Platypus, common yabby	January 10, 2011	106
While kayaking in a tributary of Australia's Murray River, Chris and Martin find a mother platypus and her eggs, and shrink down to watch them hatch. But when the evil endangered species Chef Gourmand floods the platypus's den and steals the platypus eggs, and kidnaps Chris as a side dish, Martin and Aviva work around the clock to solve the mystery of the platypus' sixth sense with the Kratts' new platypus friend. Meanwhile, as Chris tries to stall Gourmand, fellow villains, Zach Varmitech and Donita Donata, arrive for the main course—poached platypus eggs, with a side of Kratt brother. Martin activates his platypus powers with the sixth sense to rescue Chris and the eggs. Villains of the week: Chef Gourmand, Zach Varmitech, Donita Donata Animal names: Plato, Platty, Platter
7	7	"Polar Bears Don't Dance"	Luc Chamberland	Eva Almos	Baffin Island	Polar bear, walrus	January 12, 2011	107
Four days ago, during the events of the episode "Mom of a Croc", while snowboarding across the Canadian tundra, the Kratt brothers discover a mother polar bear and her cub, and Martin is almost attacked by the protective mother. After a narrow escape, Chris and Martin learn about the intense rivalry between the Arctic polar bear, and another protective mother, the Arctic walrus. But after Zach Varmitech kidnaps the cub and the calf of both animals everything goes wrong, and the Kratt brothers activate their creature power suits. Chris manages to activate his creature power suit immediately, but Martin finds it impossible to touch the mother bear without being mauled by her. The brothers manage to save the babies, but Zach kidnaps the moms to start a show in an ice arena and leaves the Kratts to survive in a thick blizzard. Then, Martin activates his creature power suit with a polar bear cub friend and they both survive as they head to save the moms with Aviva. Chris and Martin stop Zach from making the moms fight each other in the ice arena. Villain of the week: Zach Varmitech Animal name: Poby Note: This was the pilot episode and the only episode that Luc Chamberland directed.
8	8	"Build It Beaver"	Chris Kratt	Chris Kratt	Maine	North American beaver, American bullfrog, common raccoon, gray wolf, star-nosed mole, North American river otter, moose, wood duck, largemouth bass, smallmouth bass, crayfish	January 13, 2011	108
After testing Aviva's new invention, a parachute canoe, the Kratt brothers meet a young boy named Aidan Kratt, who lives near a beaver pond. But before they can leave, Chris discovers a family of beavers has integrated his favourite paddle into their beaver dam. Chris removes it, causing the whole dam to fall apart and leaving the beavers and numerous other animals without a home. Feeling guilty, Chris and Martin volunteer to help rebuild the dam as the rest of the crew bring the pond creatures into the Tortuga. But they soon discover that a flash flood is on the horizon, one that could possibly doom every creature in the pond if they do not finish the dam in time. And if breaking the dam over and over again was not enough, they also have to deal with beaver predators, and must solve the issue by the use of the abilities of the beaver. Animal names: Sticker, Timber, Buddy, Twig
9	9	"Voyage of the Butterflier XT"	Chris Kratt	Chris Kratt	Trans-North America	Monarch butterfly, eastern tiger swallowtail caterpillar, Canada lynx, Gila monster, tree swallow, European garden spider, peregrine falcon, walrus, Nubian giraffe	January 17, 2011	109
After being challenged by Aviva, Chris and Martin shrink down to the size of a monarch butterfly, and travel with a butterfly named Maxilla on her annual migration to Mexico, flying over 3,000 miles of land and sea. But the plan is complicated when Donita plans on stealing all the butterflies to launch a new line of butterfly barrettes. After she gets away with most of the butterflies while Chris and Martin are hibernating, the brothers activate their creature power suits to stop her, only to discover a shocking secret about the monarch butterflies that will change their entire worldview. Villains of the week: Donita Donata, Dabio Animal names: Maxilla, Maxilla Jr.
10	10	"Honey Seekers"	Martin Kratt	Martin Kratt	Kalahari	Honey badger, greater honeyguide, African honey bee, lion, impala, blue wildebeest,	January 19, 2011	110
While camping in the Kalahari Desert, searching for Africa's roughest, toughest predator, Chris and Martin learn that Chef Gaston Gourmand is planning on serving a mystery animal at his next buffet, with Zach Varmitech as his guest of honor. Now, the Kratt brothers must race to save the mystery animal and learn about the toughest creature which Martin thinks is the lion but Chris thinks it is the African honeybee. While at the same time discovering it is the African honey badger, learning about the symbiotic relationship between it and the honey guide until Gourmand captures the mystery animal which reveals itself to be the honey badger. The bros activate their honey guide and honey badger powers but Chris gets trapped along with Aviva. And when Martin discovers a key to stopping Gourmand, he activates his honey guide power suit to lure all the honey badgers in the Kalahari to Gourmand to defeat him. Villains of the week: Chef Gourmand, Zach Varmitech Animal names: Sweet Tweet, Tough-O
11	11	"Bass Class"	Martin Kratt	Martin Kratt	Wisconsin	Smallmouth bass, largemouth bass, crayfish, earthworm, striped bass, redbreast sunfish	January 20, 2011	111
While studying bass in America's Great Lakes, Chris and Martin meet a young boy named Gavin Kratt, who shows them his third-place-fishing trophy. But after Zach tries to steal Gavin's trophy and fails to do so, he challenges the brothers to a winner-take-all contest—whoever catches the biggest bass gets to win and keeps Gavin's trophy. At the same time learning the secrets of fishing and the bass. But the brothers soon learn that Zach is cheating, and are faced with the dilemma of how to win the contest fairly, torn between their own sense of morality, and the need to help Gavin. Villain of the week: Zach Varmitech Animal names: Gulpa
12	12	"Fireflies"	Martin Kratt	Chris Roy	Georgia	Photinus firefly, Photuris firefly, American toad	January 24, 2011	112
The Wild Kratts crew spends the night in a North American forest, studying the secrets of fireflies' bioluminescence. But when Donita Donata kidnaps all the forest's fireflies, Martin rushes off to save them despite Chris's warnings and is captured by Donita again, leaving it up to Chris to save both him and the fireflies. Villains of the week: Donita Donata, Dabio Animal name: Blinker
13	13	"Mystery of the Weird Looking Walrus"	Chris Kratt	Eva Almos	Bering Sea	Walrus, giant Pacific octopus, butter clam	January 27, 2011	113
While deep-sea diving in the Bering Sea to solve a mystery of why walruses are so weird-looking with Aviva's newly rebuilt manta riders, the Kratt brothers discover that Zach Varmitech has stolen a rare and priceless pearl. They soon learn that Zach plans to trade it to Donita Donata, in return for her partnership with him in his next evil plot, until Zach loses the pearl in the sea. The Kratts are then forced to search for the pearl while trying to save the walruses with walrus power to stop Zach who has captured them to be his robotic slaves to find the rare pearl. Villains of the week: Zach Varmitech, Donita Donata Animal name: Blobby
14	14	"Tazzy Chris"	Chris Kratt	Eva Almos	Tasmania, Zach's mansion	Tasmanian devil, American bullfrog, bulldog	January 31, 2011	114
Chris, Martin, and the Wild Kratts crew volunteer to fly to the island of Tasmania, to tag the endangered Tasmanian devil, hoping to save the species from extinction. Along the way, they find that Tasmanian devils are not the vicious carnivores that most humans believe they are, but instead gentle scavengers. But after a T-devil bites Chris's suit, it malfunctions, mutating him into an out-of-control Tasmanian devil/human hybrid. As Chris begins to slow down the mission, he gets to eat rotten meat and carcasses. Martin notices the malfunction and worries that his brother might never be the same again. Meanwhile, Zach devises a plan to keep the neighborhood children off his lawn, by turning T-devils into Tasmanian devil robots. After discovering Zach's plan, Chris must learn to control his new wild side to help the neighborhood kids and stop Zach's plot before he causes the Tasmanian devils to become extinct, forever. Villain of the week: Zach Varmitech Animal name: T-Bone, Rufus
15	15	"Octopus Wildkratticus"	Chris Kratt	Eva Almos	Pacific Ocean	Giant Pacific octopus, octopus fossil, great white shark, walrus, bowhead whale, Atka mackerel	February 3, 2011	115
While playing with Aviva's new invention, ace manta riders, Martin accidentally causes the creature power suits to fall into an Arctic trench, onto an octopus named Seven (due to his missing tentacle). In a desperate attempt to get the suits back, Chris, Martin, and Aviva dive into the depths of the ocean with a new invention called the Octopod, only to discover the suits have activated while they were still on Seven, mutating him into a horrific sea monster. Now the Kratt brothers and Aviva must risk their lives to retrieve the suits and save Seven. Animal names: Seven
16	16	"Walk on the Wetside"	Martin Kratt	Eva Almos	Costa Rica	Plumed basilisk, harpy eagle, green iguana, Boa constrictor	February 21, 2011	116
The Wild Kratts fly to Costa Rica to study another rare lizard, the basilisk lizard, capable of running on water. But unknown to the Wild Kratts, Donita and Dabio have been secretly hacking their communications, and Donita soon kidnaps their new lizard friend, Splash Claw, hoping to use him as a hat to win a contest in Paris. The brothers must then decode the mystery of water running to save Splash Claw before it is too late. Villains of the week: Donita Donata, Dabio Animal name: Splash Claw
17	17	"Elephant in the Room"	Chris Kratt	Eva Almos	Serengeti	African bush elephant, spotted hyena	February 22, 2011	117
While driving their jeep (the Createrra) across the African savanna, Chris and Martin find a baby elephant separated from his mother. Martin names him Thornsley, and brings him back to the Tortuga HQ, only to discover the power of a baby African elephant, and the work necessary to take care of one. While the team is sleeping, Thornsley takes control of the Tortuga, causing Aviva, Koki and Jimmy Z to crash-land in the desert, leaving the Kratt brothers stranded in the savanna. Jimmy Z gets mad when the elephant eats his sandwich, the gang gets miniaturized by the shrink machine and gets trapped in a shoe. The bros manage to find the Tortuga, finding it a wreck by the young mischievous elephant, and bring the crew back to their original size. Chris and Martin then find his herd and his mom, who's trapped in mud, and must use elephant strength and power to save her. They do so and Thornsley is reunited with his mother. Animal name: Thornsley
18	18	"Let the Rhinos Roll!"	Martin Kratt	Eva Almos	Serengeti	Black rhinoceros, red-billed oxpecker, lion, veiled chameleon, giant African land snail, brown dog tick	March 28, 2011	118
After black rhinos begin disappearing on the African Serengeti, the Wild Kratts crew fly there to investigate. After a suspicious rhino stampede, Chris and Martin find a baby rhino that they name Nubs. Martin takes Nubs back to the Tortuga HQ, while Chris continues to investigate the stampede, wondering if there is a connection between it and the disappearances, and if there is something sinister at work. But to Chris' horror, he discovers that Zach Varmitech is behind the whole plot, and is transforming rhinos into his own personal bulldozers. After kidnapping Chris onboard his jet, Zach reveals to him that finding Nubs was a trap so that he could trace the location of the team's headquarters—the Tortuga—and have the rhinos destroy it, with Martin and the Wild Kratts still inside. Faced with their impending doom, the Wild Kratts quickly use the strengths and weaknesses of the black rhino to save themselves, rescue Chris, and both foil Zach's plot. Villain of the week: Zach Varmitech Animal name: Nubs
19	19	"Kickin' It With the Roos"	Chris Kratt	Eva Almos	Outback	Red kangaroo, dingo, wedge-tailed eagle, laughing kookaburra	April 21, 2011	119
While cruising in the Australian Outback, a joey named Hopster steals the keys to the Createrra VX, stranding Chris and Martin in the outback until they can find the keys. In an effort to retrieve their only remaining set of car keys, Chris and Martin activate their creature power suits and disguise themselves as red kangaroos, hoping to blend in with the mob and find Hopster. But after being challenged to a kickboxing match by the herd's alpha male, the Roo boss, Chris is forced to fight him so Martin can get the keys from Hopster. But as predators begin to descend upon the mob, the Kratt brothers struggle simply to survive in the ruthless Australian Outback. Animal names: Hopster, Roo Boss
20	20	"The Blue and the Gray"	Martin Kratt	Martin Kratt	Virginia	Eastern gray squirrel, blue jay, northern goshawk, American black bear, wild turkey, common raccoon, bobcat, white-tailed deer, North American beaver, coyote	April 22, 2011	120
The Wild Kratts Crew fly to a North American oak tree forest to study the unique relationship between gray squirrels, and the oak trees that they create. But after getting lost in the forest, Chris and Martin challenge each other to a creature contest, to see which is the better oak tree planter, the grey squirrels or the blue jays. But after the contest goes too far, Martin's creature power suit malfunctions, mutating him into an oak tree. Unable to move his branches to deactivate his suit, and with Chris stuck as a grey squirrel, the Kratt brothers soon realize that they are trapped in the forest, and are surrounded by predators. Due to the Kratt brothers' communicators also being broken, Koki is unable to track their location, leaving it up to a pair of Wild Kratts kids to find and rescue them. Animal name: Old Needle Claws
21	21	"Falcon City"	Martin Kratt	Martin Kratt	New York City	Peregrine falcon, rock pigeon	May 23, 2011	121
After flying to the nearest city to learn about the peregrine falcon, the world's fastest bird (and world's fastest animal)—capable of diving up to 240 miles per hour—the Kratt brothers are disappointed to find only a flock of ordinary pigeons. But after accidentally activating his creature power suit, Chris transforms into a homing pigeon and finds himself lost in the big city. While trying to find his way home, Chris discovers that pigeons are not so ordinary and boring after all. Meanwhile, Zach decides to rid his skyscraper of all birds, including the family of peregrines that are nested on the side of the building, leaving it up to the Wild Kratts to harness the powers of both falcon and pigeon to save them. Villain of the week: Zach Varmitech Animal name: Fluff
22	22	"Koala Balloon"	Martin Kratt	Eva Almos	Outback	Koala, thorny devil, dingo, monarch butterfly	July 11, 2011	122
The Kratt brothers devise a new creature challenge, to try to survive 24 hours in the wild Australian Outback, without any kind of technology whatsoever—including their creature power suits. Both are wanting to learn more about Australia's rare desert creatures, the old-fashioned way. Ignoring Aviva's concerns about their safety, they pack their bags with survival gear, and skydive into the desert, hoping to find excitement and adventure. Meanwhile, Zach Varmitech and his Zachbots also fly to Australia to find eucalyptus leaves for Zach's eucalyptus tea, hoping to use it as a cure to his common cold. But after finding a stow-away koala in the eucalyptus leaves, Zach ejects him from his jet, attached to dozens of balloons. The Kratt brothers watch as he falls from the sky, rescue him, and name him "Koala Balloon". They volunteer to watch him and keep him safe until they arrive at the designated eucalyptus forest where the other Wild Kratts are waiting for them. Meanwhile, Aviva worries that the brothers might not survive the night, but Koki and Jimmy reassure her that Chris and Martin know what they are doing. But the koala makes Martin and Chris's survival in the desert even more difficult when he accidentally destroys their precious food and water, endangering all their lives. The two then spend their night protecting the koala from a pack of hungry dingoes, instead of getting their much-needed sleep. Eventually, Martin reveals that he packed the creature power suits anyway, just in case they needed them and use thorny devil powers with a thorny devil friend. The brothers are then forced to lose their bet with Aviva, activating their creature power suits so they could survive long enough to make it the eucalyptus forest. After finally meeting with the rest of the team, they set the koala free, and admit defeat, learning that even some of the greatest explorers and zoologists in their history sometimes needed help from modern-day technology. Villain of the week: Zach Varmitech Animal names: Koala Balloon, Spinster
23	23	"Cheetah Racer"	Martin Kratt	Martin Kratt	Tanzania	Cheetah, Thomson's gazelle skull, peregrine falcon, black rhinoceros	September 2, 2011	123
While Chris and Martin are playing with their new cheetah friend, Blur, Aviva designs a new invention, Cheetah Sneaks, hoping that it will be able to outrun a cheetah. However, the invention fails, and the Kratt brothers announce that no land animal can run faster than the cheetah—capable of running speeds up to 75 miles per hour. Aviva takes on the challenge and tries to design an invention that she hopes will outrun the cheetah, though Chris and Martin doubt she will succeed. Learning of Aviva's plan, Zach tries to prove that he is a better inventor than her, and joins in, turning the friendly competition into a high-speed race. With the contest now complicated by Zach's cheating, Chris and Martin are forced to use their creature power suits. However, when Martin finds that Blur is missing, he discovers that Zach has kidnapped her, and uses his Falcon suit ("Falcon City") once again to stop Zach. Villain of the week: Zach Varmitech Animal name: Blur
24	24	"Stuck on Sharks"	Chris Kratt	Chris Kratt	Australia	Great white shark, remora, orca, bluestreak cleaner wrasse, yellowfin tuna, giant oceanic manta ray	October 17, 2011	137
Martin and Chris are on a mission to uncover the secret life of the mysterious great white shark. They use Aviva's incredible Remora Rocketsub to "stick with" a female shark and learn that the giant predator of the sea actually has many challenges to contend with and that she could help them discover something that no one has ever seen before—the birth of great white shark pups. But when Gourmand sniffs around looking for ingredients for his shark fin soup recipe, the Wild Kratts team must help rescue their new friend. Villain of the week: Chef Gourmand Animal names: Sucker-Head, Razor-Mouth
25	25	"Mimic"	Martin Kratt	Martin Kratt	Tanzania	Cheetah, honey badger, black mamba, Grant's zebra, black rhinoceros, lion, Thomson's gazelle, spotted hyena, Nubian giraffe, African honey bee, band-eyed drone fly	October 18, 2011	125
While exploring why some animals mimic the looks of others, Martin and Chris encounter their old cheetah friend Blur, who is now a mom—she has given birth to a cheetah cub. But before they know it, evil fashion designer Donita Donata 'cat-naps' the startled mom right in front of their eyes. The Wild Kratts team springs into action on a rescue mission before Donita adds the momma cheetah to her new fall line. Martin discovers that the cheetah cub has unexpected powers of mimicry, and its ability to mimic the ferocious honey badger is the key to foiling Donita and protecting the cheetah. Villains of the week: Donita Donata, Dabio Animal names: Blur (from "Cheetah Racer"), Spot Swat
26	26	"Little Howler"	Martin Kratt	Martin Kratt	Canada	Gray wolf, cougar, common raven, moose cheetah	October 19, 2011	134
Chris and Martin find a wolf pup in Martin's bag after a chaotic morning involving a wolf pack and Chris's Creature Power Suit set in moose mode. Animal name: Little Howler, Blur (from "Cheetah Racer")
27	27	"Raptor Round-Up"	Martin Kratt	Martin Kratt	Tanzania	Secretarybird, eastern chanting goshawk, martial eagle, spotted eagle-owl, peregrine falcon, bald eagle, white-headed vulture, turkey vulture, king vulture, wedge-tailed eagle, harpy eagle, eastern screech owl, crested serpent eagle, lion, common warthog, black mamba	October 20, 2011	140
Martin and Chris challenge themselves to ID as many hawks, eagles, owls, falcons, and vultures as they can. But Gaston Gourmand has his own plan for the raptors and has been capturing them all in his quest to find the tastiest bird wing. The Wild Kratts team succeeds in rescuing the raptors before they become Gourmand's next gourmet delicacy. They'll have to use everything they know about classification and birds of prey to round up the raptors and return them to the wild. Villain of the week: Chef Gourmand Animal name: Stomp
28	28	"A Bat in the Brownies"	Martin Kratt	Martin Kratt	Georgia	Little brown bat, mosquito, eastern screech owl, largemouth bass, peregrine falcon, common raccoon	October 24, 2011	136
When a brown bat crash-lands into a plate of Jimmy Z's famous brownies, Martin and Chris set out to convince Aviva, Koki, and Jimmy Z, that bats are nothing to be afraid of. With bat activated Creature Power Suits, the bros follow join their new friend on a nocturnal fly about, and the entire crew must come to the rescue when a bat colony's roost is destroyed by a lightning bolt. Animal name: Bite-Size
29	29	"Masked Bandits"	Chris Kratt	Chris Roy	New York	Common raccoon, gray wolf, crayfish	October 25, 2011	131
As they prepare for a creature costume party, the Wild Kratts team begins to notice all sorts of strange things happening in the Tortuga HQ. Jimmy is sure there is a ghost or monster living with them, but the Kratt brothers are convinced it is some kind of creature. When the gang sets out to discover who is causing all the trouble, they discover a raccoon family has snuck into the Tortuga and that certain animals gravitate towards human habitation because it provides food and protection from predators. They must put the raccoons back to their home before the entire Tortuga HQ gets wrecked up and avoid wolves during the process. Animal name: Mama Raccoon
30	30	"Ker-honk"	Chris Kratt	Chris Kratt	Borneo	Proboscis monkey, Sunda clouded leopard, false gharial, sulphur crested cockatoo, crested serpent eagle, reticulated python	December 30, 2011	124
When Chris and Martin's Creature Power Suits get jammed in proboscis monkey mode, they find themselves joining the troop to help them stay out of reach of the top predators of the Indonesian rainforest. Animal names: Schnozzle, Nosey
31	31	"The Food Chain Game"	Chris Kratt	Chris Kratt	Tanzania	Harvester termite, helmeted guineafowl, grasshopper, Thompson's gazelle, bat-eared fox, martial eagle, cheetah, African bush elephant, lion, African rock python, Grant's zebra, Nubian giraffe, common warthog, caracal, black rhinoceros, African honey bee	January 16, 2012	130
Aviva wants to build a food web for the African savannah, so she devises a game and Martin and Chris accept her challenge. They will each start as a blade of grass and climb to the top of the food web in a game of "Food Web Fury" so Aviva can track the table during the game progress. As they play, the brothers boost their knowledge of the complex relationships between predators and prey as well as the differences between herbivores and carnivores. Animal names: Blur (from "Cheetah Racer"), Thornsley (from "Elephant in the Room")
32	32	"Flight of the Pollinators"	Chris Kratt	Chris Kratt	Central America	European honey bee, goldenrod crab spider, fig wasp, green-breasted mango, eyelash viper, kinkajou	March 30, 2012	132
When a miniaturized Chris gets covered with pollen and ends up sticking to a bee, he is off into the remarkable world of the pollinators. Martin, Aviva, and the rest of the creature explorers must find Chris in an adventure that uncovers the amazing delivery system of plants and their animal partners. They learn that plants use animals to help them make their seeds through a process called pollination, so Martin, Aviva, and the rest of the gang use that method to save Chris. Animal names: Beast, Flash, Figgy
33	33	"Caracal-Minton"	Martin Kratt	Martin Kratt	Namibia	Caracal, helmeted guineafowl, cheetah, common warthog, spotted hyena, spotted eagle owl, Nile crocodile	April 2, 2012	126
The Wild Kratts crew has a badminton tournament. While Chris and Martin are playing, a caracal steals Aviva's birdie, causing her to break down in tears. And this is no ordinary birdie—it is Aviva's precious family heirloom. Chris and Martin reassure her that they will find it, and try to find the caracal. When they do, Chris encourages Aviva to build a guinea fowl flapper, because guinea fowls are what the caracal likes to eat. She gets the inspiration to build one. On the way, Chris and Martin get captured by the same caracal that took their birdie, which they name Hang Time. When they get there, they face two caracal kittens who want to eat them. They get their birdie back but when a caracal kitten named Pouncemore gets dropped in the middle of the Namibian savanna, the Kratt brothers must use caracal creature powers and take him back to his home before hyenas find him. Animal names: Hang Time, Pouncemore
34	34	"Zig-Zagged"	Chris Kratt	Eva Almos	Angola	Grant's zebra, spotted hyena, Nubian giraffe, hippopotamus, Nile crocodile, North American beaver, Tasmanian devil	May 14, 2012	127
Chris and Martin get caught in the middle of a zebra stampede, and when the dust clears, a lone baby zebra is left behind. The Wild Kratts must find the young zebra's herd and return him to his mom. Along the way, they learn the secrets of patterns in the creature world and how the zebra's stripes are critical to a special defence called "confusion camouflage". Animal names: Maze
35	35	"A Huge Orange Problem"	Martin Kratt	Martin Kratt	Borneo	Bornean orangutan, proboscis monkey, false gharial, African bush elephant, crested porcupine, black rhinoceros, common warthog, spotted hyena, aardvark, Draco lizard, platypus	June 4, 2012	128
While Chris and Martin are off searching for the endangered orangutan in the forests of Borneo. Back at the Tortuga HQ, Aviva, Koki and Jimmy get carried away swinging on vines and their muscles get so incredibly sore that they cannot do anything. The bros attempt to rush back with the first aid kit but a huge orangutan keeps tossing them back into the forest. Here they learn that orangutans use a special leaf and chew it into a lotion to ease muscle soreness, and return with this orangutan medicine to help their friends. But Zach has sent his Zachbots to cut the trees of the orangutan forest, and Martin and Chris activate the orangutan powers of the Creature Power Suit to rid the forest of saw-armed Zachbots and save the orangutans' rainforest home. Villain of the week: Zach Varmitech Animal names: Huge-O, Schnozzle (from "Kerhonk") Thornsley (from "Elephant in the Room") Plato (from "Platypus Cafe") Slurpy (from "Aardvark Town")
36	36	"Birds of a Feather"	Chris Kratt	Eva Almos	New Guinea	Raggiana bird-of-paradise, superb bird-of-paradise, Lawes's parotia, fly	September 7, 2012	138
When Aviva reveals that dancing is just not her thing, Chris and Martin set out in the New Guinea forest to inspire her to give dancing a try by uncovering some of the greatest dancers in the creature world—the birds-of-paradise. They soon find that the male birds use their showy bright feathers and extraordinary dances to display to potential female mates that they are healthy and strong. But when the gang gets caught up in Donita's plan to capture these fashionable birds for her latest clothing line, Aviva must put her dancing skills on the line to save them and stop Donita. Villains of the week: Donita Donata, Dabio Animal names: Hip-Hop, Smiley
37	37	"Seasquatch"	Martin Kratt	Chris Roy	Pacific Ocean	Yeti crab, phytoplankton, water flea, New Zealand arrow squid, Atka mackerel, giant squid, sperm whale, tube worm, caridean shrimp, anglerfish	October 22, 2012	129
When Martin accidentally knocks Jimmy's controller into the ocean, the Kratt brothers volunteer to go into the deep to find it, encountering an anglerfish and other deep sea creatures. But then the submarine loses power while they are exploring the strange landscape of the ocean depths and they are trapped on the ocean floor of the deep sea. Aviva must figure out how to harness the energy from the deep sea's hydrothermal vents to save the brothers and return them to the surface. The Wild Kratts team learns all about the amazing process of chemosynthesis and how deep sea creatures transform toxic chemicals into energy. With a little help from the yeti crab, Martin and Chris are able to capture this energy and use it to restart the Amphisub and return to the surface. Animal names: Seasquatch, Bumper (from "Whale of a Squid")
38	38	"The Gecko Effect"	Martin Kratt	Martin Kratt	Borneo	Tokay gecko, moonrat, conehead katydid	October 23, 2012	133
There's a mystery to be solved, as the Wild Kratts team wonders how a gecko climbs up smooth surfaces and can even climb upside down. The gang uses their Miniaturizer to shrink down and discover it's all about physics: all objects have electrical charges that attract one another and the gecko's marvelous toe pad structure charges so much that they can walk on surfaces as smooth as glass. But in the meantime, Zach has stolen their Miniaturizer and imprisons them in a glass terrarium. Martin and Chris activate the new gecko powers of their Creature Power Suits that Aviva has made in the Creature Power Disc Creator (also known as the M.I.K.—Mobile Invention Kit) so the Kratt brothers must get the crew out of the glass terrarium and must retrieve the Miniaturizer before Zach shrinks all the animals in the creature world. Villains of the week: Zach Varmitech (cameo appearances Donita Donata, Dabio, Chef Gourmand) Animal names: Okay
39	39	"Googly-Eye: The Night Guru"	Chris Kratt	Chris Kratt	Borneo	Horsfield's tarsier, proboscis monkey, conehead katydid, brown tree snake	October 24, 2012	139
The Kratt brothers secretly "borrow" Aviva's half-finished night vision goggles to go in search of a mysterious nocturnal creature. But when the unstable goggles stop working, the brothers find themselves taken in by the nocturnal society of the tarsier. As they investigate, the Wild Kratts team discovers that nocturnal creatures only come out at night and learn that eyes help a creature see by collecting the light that comes from objects all around. But when the tarsier troop is in danger of losing one of their own, Chris and Martin must tap into their newfound understanding of nocturnal living and help the troubled tarsier family. Animal names: Googly Eye, Googly Jr.
40	40	"Quillber's Birthday Present"	Chris Kratt	Chris Kratt	Botswana	Crested porcupine, lion, Grant's zebra, common warthog, African bush elephant, Nubian giraffe	October 25, 2012	135
It's Aviva's birthday, and Chris and Martin decide to collect shed porcupine quills to make a beautiful necklace as a gift. As they tag along with an African crested porcupine, they discover that animals have different ways and even some highly specialized features to defend themselves from predators. For example, porcupine quills are modified hairs, designed by nature into a deadly defense. However, Zach ties balloons to many animals which then float up to his jet. The Kratt brothers must use the porcupine's amazing defense from their Creature Power Suits to protect the porcupines from Zach's latest animal collection scheme and rescue the animals Zach had captured. Villain of the week: Zach Varmitech Animal names: Quillber, Maze, (from "Zig-Zagged"), Mama Porcupine

=== Season 2 (2012–2014) ===
Beginning with this season, every episode begins with a view of the Earth before the Kratt brothers are shown introducing the audience.

No. overall	No. in season	Title	Directed by	Written by	Country/region	Animals	Original release date	Prod. code
41	1	"Bad Hair Day"	Martin Kratt	Martin Kratt	Tanzania	Lion, crested porcupine, hippopotamus, Nile crocodile, cheetah, African rock python, Macrotermes termite, common warthog, plains zebra	October 15, 2012	201
Martin and Chris Kratt and the crew are sitting around in the Createrra watching lions basking in the morning sun. A lion cub then wakes up, jumps around then wakes up his dad, the leader of the pride. Koki thinks he will be enraged that he has been woken up but Martin assures her that lion dads are one of the best dads in the world. He proves her wrong when he starts playing with him, he shakes his mane, and starts a chat about what animal has the biggest hairdo. They are interrupted when the dad roars and some fog comes out of his mouth, leading to Martin's decision to name him 'He Who Breathes Fire'. He then goes on a territory patrol. The Wild Kratts follow him while the crew stay with the pride. They experience social organization and how it helps lions. But when two twin lions try to take over the pride, the crew take the lion cubs to the Tortuga until He Who Breathes Fire gets back. The Kratt brothers are repeatedly delayed by various creatures and soon learn that being one of the top predators on the African savanna is not as easy as it looks. Animal names: He Who Breathes Fire, Lil' Cubby, El Cutisimo, Screen Saver, Cat Burglar, Martin, Chris
42	2	"Race for the Hippo Disc"	Chris Kratt	Chris Kratt	Uganda	Hippopotamus, peregrine falcon, giraffe, plains zebra, Nile crocodile, lion	October 16, 2012	202
When the brothers accidentally lose the Hippo Power Disc in the Ugandan savannah, the Wild Kratts team goes into crisis mode. They must find the disc before Zach does or he'll steal the secrets to Aviva's precious Creature Power technology. There's a mystery to be solved too: Why are hippos so territorial? Villain of the week: Zach Varmitech Animal names: Tusker, Hipster Opotamus, Momma Opotamus
43	3	"Creature Power Challenge"	Martin Kratt	Martin Kratt	Tanzania	Giraffe, common warthog, black rhinoceros, African bush elephant, Nile crocodile, cheetah, hippopotamus, peregrine falcon, white-headed vulture, spotted eagle-owl	October 17, 2012	203
Martin and Chris hold a contest to see whether rhinos or elephants are stronger, cheetahs or peregrine falcons faster, hippos or crocs better swimmers. However, Zach brings the Disrupt-O-Bots to malfunction the Creature Power Suits and the Tortuga HQ. As the suits continue to act up, the Kratt brothers realize that the powers that nature has given the animals to survive will only work in the appropriate habitats. They must get rid of Zach's Disrupt-O-Bots and finish the Creature Power challenge. Villain of the week: Zach Varmitech Animal names: Crunchina, Snappifer, and Frederica (from "Mom of a Croc")
44	4	"Termites Versus Tongues"	Chris Kratt	Chris Kratt	Tanzania	Macrotermes termite, harvester termite, common warthog, aardwolf, bat-eared fox, honey badger, aardvark	October 18, 2012	204
Aviva and Koki accidentally miniaturize themselves and get carried away by termites. The Kratt brothers must catch up to the termites and rescue them and face their predators that collect and eat termites as well as experiencing a predator-prey relationship: aardwolves, bat-eared foxes, honey badgers and aardvarks all targeting the same prey, termites. However, termites use their jaws and chemical defences to ward off these predators. Animal names: Slurpy and Slurpy's mom (from "Aardvark Town"), Big Momma T, Warty
45	5	"Secrets of the Spider's Web"	Chris Kratt	Chris Kratt	Costa Rica	Golden silk orb-weaver, European garden spider, European honey bee, Mediterranean house gecko	October 31, 2012	208
The Kratt brothers are testing out Aviva's new "super strength" rope. Unfortunately, it breaks, and Chris falls to the ground. Just when it seems that they are about to give up on creating super strong rope, a golden orb weaver spider (dubbed "Orbit" by Martin) gently parachutes down on to Chris's face on a thread of spider silk, inspiring Aviva to try to replicate spider silk. Two miniaturized Kratts explore the world of the spider and how it creates its web, finding clues along the way that indicate what spider silk is made of that will help Aviva to replicate it. They also explore the world of biotechnology, the science of nature-inspired inventions. But Donita has the intention of capturing all the orb spiders to make a dress made out of golden silk. The Kratt brothers must prevent her from doing so by using the strength and toughness of spider silk. Villains of the week: Donita Donata, Dabio Animal name: Orbit
46	6	"Happy Turkey Day"	Martin Kratt	Martin Kratt	United States	Wild turkey, coyote, northern goshawk, common raven, American black bear, bobcat, common raccoon, American toad	November 19, 2012	205
The Kratts are on a mission to stop Gourmand who is hunting for the largest turkey in the forest. As they work out how to stop him, they also help the crew to learn to differentiate wild turkeys from domesticated turkeys and learn about their amazing abilities. With the help of Wild Kratts kids Ronan, Gavin and Aidan, the Kratt brothers must protect the turkey habitat from Gourmand before he captures a turkey as one of the most important ingredients for his meal. Villain of the week: Chef Gourmand Animal name: Lightning
47	7	"Neck and Neck"	Chris Kratt	Chris Kratt	Tanzania	Giraffe, plains zebra, lion, Thomson's gazelle, impala, greater kudu	January 18, 2013	206
Aviva and Koki develop a small rivalry over why giraffes have long necks: so they can eat leaves that other animals cannot reach, or is it because they use it for a unique fighting style called necking- slamming each other's neck into the opponent's neck? The Kratts do not like this argument, so they try to find out why giraffes have long necks. They explore how giraffes use their long necks to prevent competition for food and resources and how they neck fight. But a giraffe secretly takes Creature Power Suit parts and supplies from the Tortuga, including Martin's deactivation Module and Chris' whole Creature Power Vest. Now Martin is stuck in a giraffe creature power suit, unable to deactivate it. The Kratt brothers must catch up with the giraffe, take back the materials, get Chris' Creature Power Suit, and save Martin. Animal names: Necktie, Necklace, Maze (from "Zig-Zagged")
48	8	"Speaking Dolphinese"	Chris Kratt	Chris Kratt	Caribbean Sea	Common bottlenose dolphin, great white shark, sea sponge, flathead grey mullet, sand perch	February 5, 2013 (Note: This episode was first released as a part of the "Lost at Sea" special on January 21, 2013, and on DVD the following day.)	213
The Kratt brothers learn Dolphinese from dolphins, the smartest creature in the world. Chris and Martin learn about their habitat and communication with two 4-year-old dolphins named Whistle and Click and join in with their new dolphin powers. However, a hungry shark is trying to capture Whistle when he wanders away to a shipwreck and he's trapped and scared. Martin goes and tries to find him, and does but gets trapped with Whistle with his suit deactivated. Aviva and Koki find and try to help them, but do not succeed either. Can Chris be able to master the dolphin language to warn the pod and save them all? Animal names: Click, Whistle
49	9	"Blowfish Blowout"	Chris Kratt	Chris Kratt	Caribbean Sea	Long-spine porcupinefish, plankton, water flea, spider crab, Atlantic goliath grouper, slender seahorse, hawksbill sea turtle, bluestreak cleaner wrasse, northern red snapper	February 7, 2013	216
The Kratt brothers miniaturize themselves in an attempt to learn more about the plankton near a coral reef. Unfortunately, they get swept out to sea by a strong current losing access to the miniaturizer. The brothers come across a pufferfish and learn about its habitat and defence. Meanwhile, Donita hatches a scheme to use a sea crown to make herself the best fashion queen. Aviva and Koki search for the Kratt brothers using pufferfish power. Villains of the week: Donita Donata, Dabio Animal names: Blimpy, Puffy
50	10	"Snow Runners"	Chris Kratt	Chris Kratt	Canada	Snowshoe hare, hispid hare, Canada lynx, northern goshawk, white-tailed deer, plumed basilisk (shed skin)	February 18, 2013	219
On their way to return some hispid hares whom they rescued from a forest fire to Nepal, the Wild Kratts crew stops to pick up Martin and Chris who accidentally drive the rocket-powered adventure sled into the Tortuga, nearly causing it to slide down the hill it was parked on and the hispid hare cage to slide out the open door. Martin and Chris must use the winter adaptations of the snowshoe hare and the lynx to find the hares and to bring them back to Asia before it is too late. However, Chris is in his basilisk suit and the lynx is giving Martin a difficult time that slows down the rescue of the hispid hares. Sooner or later, the lost becomes the hunted as one hispid is about to be hunted by the lynx. With the brothers' help and lynx power, the hunted become the rescued. Animal name: Avalanche
51	11	"Bugs Or Monkeys?"	Martin Kratt	Martin Kratt	Costa Rica	Geoffroy's spider monkey, jaguar, plumed basilisk, harpy eagle, peanut bug, Cholus insignis, broad-nosed weevil	April 1, 2013	207
A miniaturized Martin wants to check out insects in the rainforest, but Chris wants to investigate the world of the spider monkey. Chris wins when he puts mini Martin in his backpack and heads off through the treetops. When Martin gets kidnapped by a mischievous baby spider monkey, both brothers experience spider monkey anatomy and monkey locomotion. But just as the rescued Martin starts heading back to the Tortuga on Chris in his new spider monkey power suit, a jaguar emerges from the jungle shadows with its eyes on the baby spider monkey. The Kratts must save the baby monkey and reunite it with its family again. Animal name: Grabsy
52	12	"Shadow: The Black Jaguar"	Martin Kratt	Martin Kratt	Costa Rica	Jaguar, spectacled caiman, Geoffroy's spider monkey	April 2, 2013	209
The Wild Kratts team found a distress call in Costa Rica to find out that Zach wants to capture a rare black jaguar and use her to create his new Spybots that could wipe out the environment. The Kratt brothers meet Nina (Maya Lowe), a Wild Kratts kid, and along with her and Aviva go to learn about orange-and-black jaguars. Then they go to the orange-spotted jaguar den which reveals the jaguar to be a mother who has given birth to a black jaguar cub which Martin names 'Shadow' and Zach's Zachbots capture him. The Kratt brothers tap into the jaguar in their Creature Power Suits to get back Shadow before Zach leaves the rainforest. Villain of the week: Zach Varmitech Animal names: Shadow, Grabsy (from "Bugs Or Monkeys?")
53	13	"Rainforest Stew"	Chris Kratt	Chris Kratt	Costa Rica	Brown-throated sloth, Uroxys beetle, sloth moth, harpy eagle, jaguar, Geoffroy's spider monkey	April 3, 2013	211
The Wild Kratts learn about the sloth and sloth moth habitat in the South American rainforest. Gourmand is creating a rainforest stew that includes several rainforest species such as spider monkeys, jaguar, sloth and harpy eagle eggs. Chris enjoys being a sloth but he ends up being close to his demise while he notices the recipe. Martin activates his harpy eagle suit and detects Gourmand leaving. The Kratt brothers must rescue all of the animals before Gourmand leaves. Villain of the week: Chef Gourmand Animal names: Chillax, Grabsy (from "Bugs Or Monkeys?")
54	14	"Attack of the Tree Eating Aliens"	Chris Kratt	Chris Kratt	United States	Pileated woodpecker, Asian longhorn beetle, American pine marten, eastern gray squirrel, common raccoon	June 7, 2013	220
The Wild Kratts learned that two kids' forest clubhouse is dying. They must investigate and solve the tree-killing mystery. At first, Aviva and Koki think that woodpeckers did it but Martin gets trapped in a tree while he's miniaturized and sees a longhorn beetle, a species from China transferred by ships, munching on trees and invading habitats to fight. The Kratt brothers must save the forest trees with woodpecker powers before the longhorn beetles get rid of all of them. Will they get rid of the longhorn beetles and return them in time? Animal name: Headbanger
55	15	"To Touch a Hummingbird"	Martin Kratt	Martin Kratt	Costa Rica	Green-breasted mango, jaguar, brown-throated sloth, harpy eagle, Geoffroy's spider monkey, eyelash viper	July 5, 2013	210
Martin and Chris are getting cocky about all the Creature Powers they've collected, and Koki cautions them not to get too full of themselves because when they do, nature always teaches them a lesson. The brothers dismiss her advice, then a hummingbird appears. Amazed by its flight capabilities, Aviva creates a hummingbird power disc while the brothers set out trying to touch the friendly little bird, which is more difficult than they think. Gourmand, meanwhile, decides to create chocolate-covered hummingbird egg snacks, prompting the brothers to utilize hummingbird powers to save the eggs before Gourmand can cook them. Villain of the week: Chef Gourmand Animal names: Spaceship, Grabsy (from "Bugs Or Monkeys?"), Shadow (from "Shadow: The Black Jaguar"), Chillax (from "Rainforest Stew")
56	16	"Rattlesnake Crystal"	Martin Kratt	Martin Kratt	Sonoran Desert	Western diamondback rattlesnake, Harris's antelope squirrel, western spotted skunk, Gila monster, European garden spider, elf owl, greater roadrunner, coyote, Sonoran collared lizard, horse	August 19, 2013	221
While cruising through the clouds trying to decide where to adventure to next, the Tortuga is forced to make an emergency crash landing in the Sonoran Desert. The Kratt bros are excited to explore this new habitat, but Koki has bad news: the Tortuga will go permanently offline and die forever unless they can find a fresh stock of rare tellurium crystals. The bros go off searching for the rare mineral, but find the search difficult until they stumble upon a western diamondback rattlesnake and learn about its heat vision power, as it hunts a ground squirrel. Utilizing the rattlesnake's unique sensory abilities and creature powers, the bros race against the clock to find some tellurium and save the Tortuga.
57	17	"Gila Monster Under My House"	Martin Kratt	Martin Kratt	Sonoran Desert	Gila monster, bobcat, fall field cricket	August 20, 2013	223
Wild Kratts kid Javier finds a Gila monster under his porch in the Sonoran Desert and quickly calls the Wild Kratts. Trying to calm Javier down, the bros introduce him to the misunderstood lizard and its many creature powers—including its incredible jaw strength. Unbeknownst to them, Zach overhears and decides to kidnap the Gila monster to be part of his new line of animal wrenches. The bros must use Gila monster creature powers in order to stop Zach and return the captive lizards to the wild. Villain of the week: Zach Varmitech Animal name: Lockjaw
58	18	"Tortuga Tune-Up"	Martin Kratt	Martin Kratt	Caribbean Sea	Hawksbill sea turtle, green-breasted mango, plumed basilisk, tiger shark, spider crab	August 21, 2013	215
Aviva is troubled—by the Tortuga. She realizes that she's never programmed one of her favorite inventions with the ability to swim underwater. Searching for inspiration, the Kratt bros go underwater to explore a coral reef where they find a hawksbill sea turtle. While gathering information for Aviva, the bros learn all about sea turtle shield defence, as their new animal friend fends off a hungry tiger shark. Just when everything seems okay and the Tortuga is ready to test its new abilities, the master key is lost and sinks to the bottom of the ocean. The bros must then use sea turtle powers to fend off the circling shark and recover the key. Animal names: Shield, Blimpy (from "Blowfish Blowout"), Ocean Pony (from "Seahorse Rodeo")
59	19	"Road Runner"	Martin Kratt	Martin Kratt	Sonoran Desert	Greater roadrunner, Sonoran collared lizard, fall field cricket, western diamondback rattlesnake, coyote, Gila monster	August 22, 2013	217
Martin and Chris are trying to catch an elusive lizard while Koki, having just completed an inventory, declares that they have to go to a town to get supplies. But Martin and Chris still have not seen so many of the reptiles that live in the Sonoran desert. The bros beg for some time to investigate a particular lizard, which gets snatched up by a roadrunner. The bros secretly beg Aviva to come and make a roadrunner disc to use before Koki is ready to leave. Aviva is only able to make one roadrunner disc, so the brothers take turns with roadrunner powers, ultimately using roadrunner powers to discover the identity of the mystery lizard. Martin gets caught by a Gila monster after he deactivates his suit so he cannot speak once Koki and Jimmy wrapped Martin for first aid, thinking he is in pain. Chris and Aviva help out to find the identity once Koki locks the Tortuga and they leave the Sonoran Desert but discover the identity of the mystery lizard before leaving. Animal name: Speed Limit
60	20	"Skunked!"	Chris Kratt	Chris Kratt	Sonoran Desert	Western spotted skunk, cougar, western diamondback rattlesnake, Arizona bark scorpion, Sonoran collared lizard, pinacate beetle, greater roadrunner, coyote	October 25, 2013	222
When the Tortuga gets taken over by spotted skunks who decide to den up, the Wild Kratts team must try to reclaim their headquarters. In what turns out to be a very stinky situation, the Wild Kratts team gets sprayed one by one and are forced to try ever more elaborate plans to take back their HQ, while simultaneously searching for an effective skunk stink antidote. Meanwhile, Zach sneaks into the Tortuga to take it and all of Aviva's inventions data, and even kidnaps the skunks with his new invention. The crew learned about their defences and how they release their stench. The Kratt brothers must use their skunk powers to stink up Zach to make him run away from the Sonoran Desert and free the skunks from the Tortuga. The Wild Kratts team then have to use Aviva's antidote (a mixture of hydrogen peroxide, baking soda, and dish soap) to freshen them again. Villain of the week: Zach Varmitech Animal names: Mr. P.U. Skunk Note: This is the first episode to premiere after the network fully transitioned entirely to the standard PBS Kids branding on October 7, 2013.
61	21	"Seahorse Rodeo"	Martin Kratt	Martin Kratt	Caribbean Sea	Slender seahorse, horse, northern red snapper, bluestreak cleaner wrasse, flathead grey mullet, Atlantic goliath grouper, water flea, amphipod	December 23, 2013	212
Chris and Martin are riding horses on the beach of Costa Rica one day when they suddenly go flying into the water and discover a seahorse. Martin wants to "ride" the seahorse with Chris, and together make a string of lies, Chris telling Aviva that they want to use the Miniaturizer to explore how this seahorse interacts with other inhabitants of the coral reef system. Of course, Aviva does not fall for it and instead plays a strict mother, telling the Kratts she's going to keep an eye on them. But while the Kratts are at play, Donita Donata is busy scheming up her next big plan: seahorse earrings. To do that she calls the Kratts, and eventually they give in accidentally. The Kratt brothers must collect all seahorses with creature powers and trick Donita to get her away and free the seahorses. Villains of the week: Donita Donata, Dabio Animal names: Ocean Pony, Golf Ball
62	22	"Aqua Frog"	Martin Kratt	Martin Kratt	United States	American bullfrog, smallmouth bass, largemouth bass, spiny softshell turtle, North American beaver, redbreast sunfish	December 26, 2013	214
Martin and Chris are researching frogs at Frogwater Pond. The bros meet one big bullfrog in the best spot in the pond, where they witness the beginning of the frog's life cycle. That sends Aviva into panic because she realizes that due to the transformation that happens within the frog's own life cycle, this particular Creature Power Suit may be her most challenging yet. To help get the Power suit done, they shrink down and see the frog's life cycle. Unbeknownst to them, Zach has instructed his bots to clean up his ship and dump his garbage into a stream. When Zach's waste enters the pond, Koki, Jimmy Z, Aviva, and some local Wild Kratt kids go into rescue mode to stop the ooze from reaching the eggs and developing tadpoles. The Kratt bros, meanwhile, swim upstream to stop Zach with their frog powers. Then, the rest of them used a filter that Aviva made to get rid of the ooze at last. Villain of the week: Zach Varmitech Animal name: Tuba
63	23	"Rocket Jaw: Rescuer of the Reef"	Chris Kratt	Chris Kratt	Caribbean Sea	Longlure frogfish, hawksbill sea turtle, northern red snapper, queen parrotfish, flathead grey mullet, Atlantic goliath grouper, coral polyp, amphipod	December 27, 2013	218
While checking out how coral reefs are formed, the gang notices some very strange types of parrotfish taking whole branches of coral and swimming off with them. After further investigation, the Wild Kratts crew realizes that Zach and Donita have sent robotic fish to collect coral for mass production of coral jewellery. The gang must use the power of the greatest hunters of the reef—the frogfish—who also happens to be the fastest creature alive, to capture the reef–wrecking robots before it's too late. Villains of the week: Zach Varmitech, Donita Donata, (mentioned: Dabio) Animal name: Rocket Jaw
64	24	"Desert Elves"	Chris Kratt	Chris Kratt	Sonoran Desert	Burrowing owl, elf owl, jumping bean moth, Mexican jumping bean, pinacate beetle, Sonoran collared lizard, western diamondback rattlesnake, Harris's antelope squirrel, Arizona bark scorpion, coyote	November 18, 2013	224
When Koki and Jimmy get stranded in the desert, Aviva and the Kratt brothers must rely on the serendipitous trail of Jimmy's lost seed collection to lead them to their friends. But when the Mexican jumping bean trail becomes broken by some unsuspecting creatures inside them, the gang must rely on the eyes, ears and powers of the "desert elves", the owl, to find their friends in the harsh desert habitat. They realize it is an elf owl underground and an elf owl that lives inside a cactus. Animal name: Elfis
65	25	"Journey to the Subnivean Zone"	Chris Kratt	Chris Kratt	Quebec, Subnivean zone	Meadow vole, ermine, red fox, peregrine falcon, moose, wild turkey, snowshoe hare	January 30, 2014	226
When a mission to discover the birth of a snowflake goes awry, the Kratt brothers discover a strange and unlikely colony of snow creatures living in the mysterious Subnivean Zone. But when Aviva's quest for an engineered "beach vacation" inadvertently alters the fragile northern landscape, the gang must work together to restore the life-giving blanket of snow that is so critical to creature survival. Animal names: Rolo, Torpedo
66	26	"Groundhog Wakeup Call"	Martin Kratt	Martin Kratt	Appalachian Mountains	Groundhog, American robin, coyote	January 31, 2014	225
Down in the southern Appalachians, the crew decides to take a rest day. Aviva goes out for a nap in a field and a little newborn groundhog nibbles on her nose. She calls him Dandelion and decides to make a new Creature Power Suit. The bros wonder if the groundhog has abilities to make a Creature Power Suit, but Aviva says she's sure these cute little groundhogs have some hidden superpowers and she decides to test this suit out herself. It turns out that one of the hidden powers of the groundhog is their ability to hibernate, and the bros have to figure out what causes groundhogs to emerge from their burrows as they try to rescue Aviva from a deep winter sleep that her groundhog Power Suit has put her into. Animal name: Dandelion

=== Season 3 (2014–2015) ===
No. overall	No. in season	Title	Directed by	Written by	Country/region	Animals	Original release date	Prod. code
67	1	"The Hermit Crab Shell Exchange"	Martin Kratt	Martin Kratt	Caribbean	Caribbean hermit crab, sea hermit crab, red cushion sea star, laughing gull, tiger shark, Atlantic goliath grouper, green moray eel, queen conch	April 7, 2014	301
Martin and Chris play pranks on each other and discover a hermit crab on the beaches of the Caribbean sea and try to avoid Gourmand who plans on boiling all of the hermit crabs on the beach. Villain of the week: Chef Gourmand Animal name: Picky
68	2	"Where the Bison Roam"	Chris Kratt	Chris Kratt	Great Plains	American bison, common raccoon, black-tailed prairie dog, peregrine falcon, pronghorn antelope, elk, coyote, burrowing owl, black-footed ferret, European honey bee	April 8, 2014	310
The team explores the spot where Lewis and Clark first saw the American prairie. While cleaning the teleporter's activation ring, Jimmy Z accidentally rolls it onto the horn of the lead bull in the herd. The Kratts have to find a way to get the ring back without getting charged and discover that bison and prairies are more difficult to find than they were back then. Animal names: Raging Bull, Muncher, [mentioned: Mr. Roo Boss (from "Kicking It With the Roos") and Necktie (from "Neck and Neck")]
69	3	"Bandito: The Black-Footed Ferret"	Martin Kratt	Martin Kratt	Great Plains	Black-footed ferret, black-tailed prairie dog, peregrine falcon	April 9, 2014	309
Martin crash-lands Aviva's new Stone Digger and encounters a lost colony of black-footed ferrets. Zach soon discovers the ability of these sneaky creatures and uses them for his new robber bots. Can the Wild Kratts create black-footed ferret powers before Zach can use his robber bots? Villain of the week: Zach Varmitech Animal name: Bandito
70	4	"When Fish Fly"	Chris Kratt	Chris Kratt	Caribbean Sea	Atlantic flyingfish, laughing gull, common bottlenose dolphin	April 10, 2014	302
Martin and Chris switch jobs as Creature Adventurers with Inventors Aviva and Koki to see who has the most challenging job. The two girls come across a school of flying fish and the gang learns about how flying fish can glide across the water while trying to save Koki, who got separated riding on "Fishy". Animal names: Fishy, Click and Whistle (from "Speaking Dolphinese")
71	5	"Osprey"	Martin Kratt	Martin Kratt	Everglades	Osprey, smallmouth bass, dragonfly, green-breasted mango, largemouth bass	April 11, 2014	307
Jimmy drops the Tortuga key into the ocean, so Chris, Martin, and Aviva are on a race to develop osprey powers in order to find the lost keys to the Tortuga. Zach is also in this race to retrieve the key and steal all the Wild Kratts tech. The Wild Kratts are on the clock to get enough information to develop osprey power before Zach can steal the Tortuga keys. Villain of the week: Zach Varmitech Animal names: Slip Grip and Fluffy Flier
72	6	"Back in Creature Time: Day of the Dodo"	Chris Kratt	Chris Kratt	Mauritius (1600s), Philippines	Dodo, tarsier, Philippine eagle, dragonfly	July 7, 2014	325
After a quick scan on Philippine eagle eggs and learning the animals are going extinct, which means the Kratt brothers will never adventure with creatures gone forever until Aviva reveals a Trampoline like a time machine which the Kratt brothers use to jump back in time up to 500 years in the past. First, they decided to see a dodo and Koki, Chris, and Martin jump back on Mauritius Island in the early 1600s when the dodos became extinct. Gourmand's ancestor, Great Great Granddaddy Gourmand (Zachary Bennett) plans to use the dodos for his lunch. The Wild Kratts have to rescue the dodos before they become extinct and travel back to the present day before the remote runs low on power. Villains of the week: Great Great Granddaddy Gourmand, Zach Varmitech Animal names: Rocko, Brainio
73	7	"Back in Creature Time: Tasmanian Tiger"	Martin Kratt	Martin Kratt	Tasmania (1880s), Philippines	Tasmanian tiger, Tasmanian devil, tiger quoll, wedge-tailed eagle, eastern grey kangaroo, Philippine eagle, domestic sheep	July 7, 2014	326
Aviva invented a "time trampoline" that allows the Kratt brothers to travel back in creature time. The animal they go to visit this time is the Tasmanian tiger, who they try to teach how to survive as the humans start to cultivate the land. They meet Donita Donata and Dabio's ancestors, Shonita Donata (Eva Almos) and Shabio (Cory Doran), as some shepherds who contributed to the extinction of the Tasmanian tiger. Zach uses this opportunity to try to trap the Kratt brothers back in creature time. Villains of the week: Zach Varmitech, Shonita Donata, Shabio Animal names: Taz Dad, Taz Mom, Little X
74	8	"The Amazing Creature Race"	Chris Kratt	Chris Kratt	Great Plains	Pronghorn, black-tailed prairie dog, American bison, burrowing owl, black-footed ferret	July 8, 2014	312
The Wild Kratts hold a competition to determine who the best runners are in the animal world. Chris races as a pronghorn antelope, Martin races as a gray wolf, Aviva races as a Thomson's gazelle, and Koki races as a cheetah. Meanwhile, Zach waits to capture the winning animal for use as a "runner-bot". Villain of the week: Zach Varmitech Animal names: Pacer, Raging Bull (from "Where the Bison Roam")
75	9	"Prairie Who?"	Martin Kratt	Martin Kratt	Great Plains	Lesser prairie-chicken, coyote, prairie rattlesnake, black-tailed prairie dog, prairie falcon, prairie kingsnake, American bison	July 9, 2014	313
While the crew try to find a prairie animal to adventure within the great plains, the Tortuga gets caught by a tornado, and they get separated in the prairie. Chris told the crew to find a prairie rattlesnake at a sunning spot where this cool creature could be warming. The Wild Kratts team tries to find each other, discovering many prairie animals along the way, because they got a bad message. Animal name: Tracker
76	10	"Mystery on the Prairie"	Chris Kratt	Chris Kratt	Great Plains	Brown-headed cowbird, loggerhead shrike, American bison, prairie kingsnake, American robin, grasshopper	July 10, 2014	314
When Martin and Chris find an unusual thorn bush with "spiked" grasshoppers and beetles, they set out to uncover the identity of the mystery culprit, a loggerhead shrike. Martin also comes across a shrike nest with a cowbird hatchling and is captured by the shrike. Now the Wild Kratts have to figure out a way to rescue both Martin and the cowbird without startling the local bison herd. Animal names: Spike, Mama Shrike, Moo, Thorn, Spear, Spike Jr.
77	11	"Mosquito Dragon"	Chris Kratt	Chris Kratt	Everglades	Mosquito, dragonfly, American alligator, common raccoon, American black bear, white-tailed deer	July 21, 2014	304
While exploring the swamps of Florida the team gets attacked and swarmed by mosquitoes. The team tries to figure out why mosquitoes suck other creatures' blood. They discover the mosquito life cycle and learn that blood is rich with protein that mosquitoes need for their eggs and is this the reason why mosquitoes drink blood. Meanwhile, Zach designs "mosquito-bots" to steal data from the Tortuga's computers. When Zach releases the swarm of mosquito-bots, the Kratt brothers need dragonfly powers to save the Tortuga. Since real mosquitoes sense warm air from the breath of people and animals Zach has designed his mosquito bots to sense gases and air coming from the Tortuga; however, this backfires on him as his own ship has way hotter and easier to detect gas and air than the Tortuga and the bots start coming to Zach's ship. Villain of the week: Zach Varmitech Animal name: Swamp Dragon
78	12	"Crocogator Contest"	Martin Kratt	Martin Kratt	Everglades	American alligator, American crocodile, common raccoon, white-tailed deer, American bullfrog, largemouth bass, Florida softshell turtle, tiger shark, mosquito	July 21, 2014	311
The Wild Kratts go on a Crocogator Challenge to figure out what the differences between crocodiles and alligators are, and why the creature needs those differences.
79	13	"Slider: The Otter"	Martin Kratt	Martin Kratt	Everglades, Northern Woodlands	North American river otter, American alligator, alligator gar, largemouth bass, bluegill, osprey	July 22, 2014	303
Martin and Chris found a river otter cub looking for his family. The Kratt brothers help their otter friend Slider search for his otter pack, all while teaching him how to survive in the Cypress Swamp. They find a close family of otters believing it to be Slider's family; however, it is not and the Kratts and Slider get chased out of their territory. They are then shocked to learn from DNA evidence that Slider is actually an otter from the northeastern United States that accidentally got brought to Florida after being trapped on a ship. They have to fly him home using osprey powers as due to the ship incident that brought him to Florida he is scared of heavy machinery and thus did not want to go inside the Tortuga nor Buzz Bike. Animal names: Slider
80	14	"Search for the Florida Panther"	Chris Kratt	Chris Kratt	Everglades	Florida panther, American alligator, great emerald pondhawk, blue dasher, mosquito, white-tailed deer, common raccoon	July 23, 2014	306
When the Wild Kratts team notice an endangered and injured Florida panther, the team has to help it heal. To make matters worse the panther is a mother and has cubs, so it's up to Martin and Chris to use Florida panther powers to cub-sit the baby panthers. However, this job is easier said than done as the cubs are so hungry to the point where they attempt to eat Martin and Chris's communication devices, so they have to hunt food themselves using stealth like a real big cat. They also have to deal with dangerous alligators who steal their food and attempt to eat the cubs; however, the mother panther heals from its injuries, springs to the rescue and makes the alligator back down. Animal names: Mama Panther, Swat, Crunch
81	15	"Opossum in My Pocket"	Chris Kratt	Chris Kratt	Everglades	Virginia opossum, American alligator, North American river otter, burrowing owl, American bullfrog, mosquito, dragonfly, common pill-bug, coyote, eastern diamondback rattlesnake, Florida leatherleaf slug, Florida woods cockroach	July 24, 2014	308
While on a mission to find Chris' lost backpack in the Cypress Swamp, the brothers discover an opossum looking for one of its babies. Gourmand is also on the hunt with the backpack and a lost baby opossum, with the idea of making an opossum pizza pocket. They witness an opossum playing dead instinctively when a coyote attempts to make a meal out of it. Chris and Martin use opossum powers to help them navigate the swamp; however, the suit has all the opossum's powers including playing possum, which is shown when Gourmand scares Martin and causes him to go in tonic immobility mode, which gives Gourmand time to get to his kitchen. Eventually the Kratt bros and Aviva confront Gourmand, then find another bag. Gourmand evilly warns them not to open it but Aviva pulls the string and realizes Gourmand set this bag up as a trap for them and the contents of this bag are highly venomous eastern diamondback rattlesnakes, so now the team is trapped in a field of deadly rattlesnakes. The opossum ends up receiving 2 venomous bites from the snakes and the team ponders why nothing is happening to the opossum, then they realize that opossums have immunity to snake venom, and since Martin and Chris are in opossum suits they also have rattlesnake venom immunity, so they are able to save the baby opossum and get themselves and Aviva out of the snake field, and while Gourmand is angry about his defeat the snakes start to turn on him and he angrily leaves. Meanwhile, the opossum family is reunited. Villain of the week: Chef Gourmand Animal names: Jill, Joey, Lil' Jack, Jojo, Jillybean
82	16	"Praying Mantis"	Martin Kratt	Martin Kratt	Suburb	European mantis, tokay gecko, milk snake, peppered moth	August 12, 2014	323
One summer morning, Wild Kratts kids Gavin and Ronan wake up to find praying mantis hatchlings all over their room, so they decided to call the Wild Kratts for help in getting them out of bed without hurting the mantises. The Kratt brothers suit up with Gecko Power and the Tortuga arrive to get the two kids out while not trampling over any hatchlings. Meanwhile, Zach Varmitech develops a petty grudge against the Wild Kratts and builds robotic mantis arms with a captured mantis inside. Zach uses the extending arms to seize the Miniaturizer. He then kidnaps Koki and Jimmy and confines them in his ship. Now the Wild Kratts have to save the day. Villain of the week: Zach Varmitech Animal names: None
83	17	"Under Frozen Pond"	Martin Kratt	Martin Kratt	Maine	North American river otter, North American beaver, Canada goose, American bullfrog, rainbow trout	January 19, 2015	305
The gang and some Wild Kratts kids head to a frozen pond to see what the water animals there do during winter. However, Zach, Donita, and Gourmand want to have a secret meeting in that area. The gang meets Zach, Donita, Dabio, and Gourmand, who all play a hockey game to see who stays and who goes. Villains of the week: Zach Varmitech, Donita Donata, Dabio, and Chef Gourmand Animal names: Slider (from "Slider: The Otter"), Sticker, Timber, Buddy and Twig (from "Build it Beaver")
84	18	"Chameleons on Target"	Martin Kratt	Martin Kratt	Madagascar, cloud forest	Parson's chameleon, nose-horned chameleon, Brookesia chameleon, band-eyed drone fly, golden bamboo lemur, Milne-Edwards's sifaka, diademed sifaka, aye-aye, peregrine falcon, smallmouth bass, common raccoon, eastern gray squirrel, American black bear, northern goshawk, blue jay, wild turkey	April 20, 2015	315
Aviva loses her new malfunction-removing ring chip to a skinny finger mystery lemur. Chris and Martin decided to use the powers of the local chameleons to see if they can find the lemur and get the ring chip back. They also need to work with their chameleon tongues since every time they open their mouthes, their tongues fly out. Animal name: Target
85	19	"Lemur Stink Fight"	Chris Kratt	Chris Kratt	Madagascar, spiny desert	Ring-tailed lemur, spiny chameleon, Agaeus bicolor	April 21, 2015	320
The Wild Kratts crew wake up to the screechy and eerie sound of what is a war for peace between two groups of ring-tailed lemurs. They soon learn how they stay out of each other's fur by leaving smells. Soon, Donita Donata and Dabio are collecting the scents of the ring-tailed lemurs for perfume causing the Ring-tailed War to start again. Villains of the week: Donita Donata and Dabio Animal names: Clingon, Stinkflinger
86	20	"Capture the Fishmobile"	Chris Kratt	Chris Kratt	Atlantic Ocean	Brown pelican, common bottlenose dolphin, sperm whale, longlure frogfish, osprey, laughing gull, Gulf menhaden	April 22, 2015	324
Martin and Chris challenge the crew to a hunting game with Aviva's new sea vehicles: The Fishmobiles. The gang accepts and the winner would be the leaders of the team. The crew join a school of menhaden and the bros use some of the best fishing creatures in the world. Animal names: Gular, Bumper and Bumper's mom (from "Whale of a Squid"), Rocket Jaw (from "Rocket Jaw: Rescuer of the Reef"), Fishy Flier (formerly Fluffy Flier) (from "Osprey"), Click and Whistle (from "Speaking Dolphinese")
87	21	"Aye Aye"	Chris Kratt	Chris Kratt	Madagascar	Aye-aye, sperm whale, mouse lemur, pileated woodpecker	July 8, 2015	318
The Kratts pretend that they're pirates and soon met up with a strange castaway. They soon find that their guest is a baby aye aye and the bros go find his parents. Soon, the little aye aye causes real trouble when he almost ends up dead in the Tortuga air vents. Animal names: Goblin, Goblin's Mom, Bumper (from "Whale of a Squid"), Headbanger (from "Attack of the Tree Eating Aliens")
88	22	"Tenrec Treasure Hunt"	Chris Kratt	Chris Kratt	Madagascar, cloud forest	Lesser hedgehog tenrec, lesser long-tailed shrew tenrec, mole-like rice tenrec, lowland streaked tenrec, web-footed tenrec, ring-tailed mongoose, aye-aye, diademed sifaka, Madagascar hissing cockroach, earthworm, beetle grub, golden bamboo lemur, Parson's chameleon	July 8, 2015	322
Chris makes a treasure hunt for the crew on the Madagascan insectivore: the tenrecs. It soon gets difficult when their last clue leads to a mini-Martin lost in Madagascar. The crew uses all they know on tenrecs to find Martin plus a baby tenrec named Pokey and finish the treasure hunt at the same time. Animal names: Pokey, Mama-T, Spikeball, Bing-Boing, Goblin (from "Aye Aye")
89	23	"Lemur Legs"	Martin Kratt	Martin Kratt	Madagascar, spiny desert	Verreaux's sifaka, radiated tortoise, lesser hedgehog tenrec, spiny chameleon	July 15, 2015	319
The Wild Kratts are in Madagascar for the first time and meet a sifaka lemur family in the spiny desert. Meanwhile, Gourmand is planning on stealing the sifaka family of lemurs and serving them like frog legs. So the Wild Kratts must use lemur powers in order to save the lemurs themselves. Villains of the week: Chef Gourmand, Zach Varmitech and Donita Donata (cameo) Animal names: Bob, Mrs. President, Fuzztop, Lounger
90	24	"Golden Bamboo Lemur"	Martin Kratt	Martin Kratt	Madagascar, cloud forest	Golden bamboo lemur, Parson's chameleon, fossa, aye-aye, diademed sifaka, mouse lemur, Geoffroy's spider monkey, proboscis monkey, greater flamingo	July 15, 2015	321
On their last day in Madagascar, the Wild Kratts crew get a call from a Madagascan Wild Kratts kid that a new baby golden bamboo lemur is born. They soon meet the little golden lemur and soon meet Donita Donata who is collecting the lemur for a new golden dress. And to keep the Kratts busy, she releases a pair of spider monkeys and proboscis monkeys to cause madness in Madagascar. Villains of the week: Donita Donata and Dabio Animal name: Goldpuff
91	25	"Mini Madagascar"	Martin Kratt	Martin Kratt	Madagascar, cloud forest	Madagascar hissing cockroach, pygmy mouse lemur, diademed sifaka, Brookesia chameleon, termite, forest leech, lowland streaked tenrec, band-eyed drone fly, snowshoe hare, northern goshawk, hawksbill sea turtle, slender seahorse, long-spine porcupinefish, tiger shark	July 22, 2015	317
Chris and Martin go minisized and explore the small world of Madagascar. They think that Madagascar is safe without any big predators around. They soon see that Madagascar is filled with small monsters. Animal names: Lemaire, Avalanche (from "Snow Runners"), Shield (from "Tortuga Tune-up"), Blimpy (from "Blowfish Blowout"), Ocean Pony (from "Seahorse Rodeo")
92	26	"Fossa-Palooza"	Chris Kratt	Chris Kratt	Madagascar, cloud forest	Fossa, diademed sifaka, Madagascar hissing cockroach, Parson's chameleon, lowland streaked tenrec	July 22, 2015	316
Chris is bummed that the crew has to leave Madagascar for Mother's Day. They have not met the fossa (a very catlike, predatorial mongoose of Madagascar). Suddenly, Martin opens the garage door in midflight and Chris falls in Madagascar to find a fossa mom and baby. Villains of the week: Donita Donata and Dabio Animal name: None

=== Season 4 (2015–2017) ===
No. overall	No. in season	Title	Directed by	Written by	Country/region	Animals	Original release date	Prod. code
93	1	"The Last Largest Lobster"	Martin Kratt	Martin Kratt	Massachusetts	American lobster, laughing gull, Atlantic cod, Gulf menhaden, water flea, Caribbean hermit crab, sardine, great white shark	July 29, 2015	409
A seagull drops one of Martin's Creature Power Discs into the ocean, and when the Kratt brothers dive in after the disc, they encounter an enormous lobster. Aviva programs Lobster Powers for Chris and Martin, but when the Kratt brothers try them out, only Chris's Creature Power Suit activates as an adult lobster. Martin's Power Suit malfunctions, turning Martin into a microscopic lobster larva. The Wild Kratts kids begin a search for Martin, but Chris must protect "the last largest lobster" from Chef Gourmand. Villain of the week: Chef Gourmand Animal names: The Last Largest Lobster, Red Crush
94	2	"Stars of the Tides"	Chris Kratt & Chris Roy	Chris Kratt	Atlantic Ocean	Common starfish, Caribbean hermit crab, barnacle, common tortoise limpet, water flea, amphipod, sea anemone, red sea urchin, laughing gull, mussel, dog whelk, American lobster, common sunstar	July 29, 2015	408
When the Kratt brothers argue over which of them gets to keep a beautiful seashell, Aviva organizes a contest to settle the matter. Chris and Martin will need to survive and race to the finish line in one of the harshest habitats on Earth: the intertidal zone. To do so, they must use the Creature Powers of animals that live in this constantly changing environment.
95 96 (Note: According to the Copyright Catalog, "A Creature Christmas" and "Creatures of the Deep Sea" take up two episode numbers, while the other hour-long specials only take up one.)	3 4	"A Creature Christmas"	Martin Kratt & Chris Roy	Martin Kratt	Northwest Territories, Madagascar, South Dakota, Peru	Snowy owl, gray wolf, American red squirrel, muskox, caribou, American pine marten, blue jay, red panda, giant panda, golden snub-nosed monkey, plains zebra, cheetah, hippopotamus, black rhinoceros, African bush elephant, aardvark, Nile crocodile, golden bamboo lemur, osprey, wild turkey, Florida panther, American bison, North American beaver, groundhog, North American river otter, platypus, koala, proboscis monkey, red kangaroo, Tasmanian devil, Bornean orangutan, ring-tailed lemur, diademed sifaka, aye-aye, lowland streaked tenrec, black-footed ferret, Geoffroy's spider monkey, jaguar, lion, Atlantic puffin, Parson's chameleon, aardvark, spirit bear, Draco lizard, Virginia opossum, loggerhead shrike, brown-headed cowbird, red kangaroo, Arctic wolf, orca, narwhal, moose	November 25, 2015	405 406
The Wild Kratts are celebrating their annual Christmas party, when they receive alerts that Zach Varmitech, Donita Donata, and Gourmand are capturing infant animals from all over the world. They postpone their party in order to stop them. After failing to stop the villains the first time, the Wild Kratts continue to postpone their Christmas party in order to stop the villains' plan to use infant animals as decorations in a shopping mall. Villains: Zach Varmitech, Donita Donata and Dabio, Chef Gourmand Animal names: Slurpy (from "Aardvark Town"), Platty and Platter (from "Platypus Cafe"), Buddy and Twig (from "Build It Beaver"), T-Bone (from "Tazzy Chris"), Thornsley (from "Elephant in the Room"), Nubs (from "Let the Rhinos Roll!"), Hopster (from "Kickin' It With the Roos"), Fluffy Flier (from "Osprey"), Koala Balloon (from "Koala Balloon"), Nosey (from "Kerhonk"), Spot Swat (from "Mimic"), Maze (from "Zig-Zagged"), Little Howler (from "Little Howler"), Hipster (from "Race for the Hippo Disc"), Jilly Bean, Jo-Jo, Joey Lil' Jack (from "Opossum in My Pocket"), Lightning (from "Happy Turkey Day"), Grabsy (from "Bugs or Monkeys?"), Shadow (from "Shadow: The Black Jaguar"), Dandelion (from "Groundhog Wakeup Call"), Slider (from "Slider: The Otter"), Swat and Crunch (from "Search for the Florida Panther"), Bandito (from "Bandito: The Black-Footed Ferret"), Muncher (from "Where the Bison Roam"), Moo, Thorn, Spear, Spike Jr. (from "Mystery on the Prairie"), Target (from "Chameleons on Target"), Pokey (from "Tenrec Treasure Hunt"), Goblin (from "Aye Aye"), Clingon (from "Lemur Stink Fight"), the baby crocs (from "Mom of a Croc"), Gold Puff (from "Golden Bamboo Lemur"), Stuffo (from "Panda Power Up!"), Frosty and Scoop (from "Snowy Owl Invasion"), Blue Goggle (from "Golden Snub Nosed Monkey Man"), Lost-and-Found (from "Red Panda Rescue"), Spirit Jr. and Bellyful (from "Spirit Bear"), Baby Tooth and Kid Musky (from "Baby Tooth & Kid Musky"), Swirly (from "This Orca Likes Sharks"), Two Tusker (from "The Mystery of the Two Horned Narwhal")
97	5	"Box Turtled In!"	Chris Kratt & Chris Roy	Chris Kratt	United States	Eastern box turtle, European honey bee, coyote, bald eagle, dragonfly, common raccoon, peregrine falcon, fire ant	April 25, 2016	418
When Jimmy Z accidentally lands the Tortuga on the Miniaturizer, the ship and the Wild Kratts crew are miniaturized. A coyote then carries the box turtle-sized Tortuga away from the Miniaturizer, and the Wild Kratts must return to the Miniaturizer and get back to normal size. However, predators and cars pose a threat to the Tortuga, just like they do to real turtles. Animal names: Caja, Bandito the Raccoon
98	6	"The Other Martins"	Martin Kratt & Chris Roy	Martin Kratt	Maine	Purple martin, American pine marten, American red squirrel, American bullfrog, spiny softshell turtle, housefly, dragonfly, mayfly	April 26, 2016	411
When a bird called a purple martin keeps dive-bombing Chris, Chris complains to Aviva, Koki, and Jimmy Z about it. At first, the team is confused, thinking Chris is talking about his brother, Martin. When they discover Chris is talking about a bird, the Wild Kratts decide to creature adventure with both the purple martin and a member of the weasel family called the pine marten. Martin is delighted to hang out with animals that share his name, but Chris is unhappy due to a series of unfortunate events that happen to him, one of which is a squirrel stealing his Creature Power vest. Martin must save the day by using Pine Marten Power to get Chris's Creature Power vest back from the squirrel. Animal names: Martin Jr, Li'l Marty
99	7	"Sea Otter Swim"	Chris Kratt & Chris Roy	Chris Kratt	Pacific Ocean	Sea otter, red sea urchin, clam, bald eagle, Steller sea lion, common bottlenose dolphin, brown pelican, sperm whale, loggerhead turtle, green moray eel, kelp perch, starfish	April 27, 2016	414
Jimmy reveals to the other Wild Kratts that he's not a very good swimmer. To help Jimmy learn to swim better, the Kratt brothers take Jimmy to meet a friend of theirs-a sea otter named Coach. While Jimmy practices swimming and diving, the Wild Kratts learn about the features that make sea otters such good swimmers. They also lose a sea otter disc and they challenge Jimmy to find it first and if he finds the disc he can activate sea otter powers. Animal names: Coach, Cork, Click and Whistle (from "Speaking Dolphinese"), Gular (from "Capture the Fishmobile"), Bumper (from "Whale of a Squid")
100	8	"Animals Who Live to be 100 Years Old"	Martin Kratt & Chris Roy	Martin Kratt	Colombia, Galápagos Islands, Dinaric Alps, Arctic, Sea of Japan	Common fruit fly, scarlet macaw, Galápagos tortoise, human fish, bowhead whale, immortal jellyfish, sardine	April 28, 2016	419
In the 100th episode of the series, Martin introduces the rest of the Wild Kratts team to his pet fruit fly, Juice. However, since fruit flies only live for a few weeks, Juice soon dies, saddening the Wild Kratts. The gang begins to wonder about animal lifespans and if any animals can live for 100 years or more, so they decide to travel the world in search of the longest-lived creatures. But someone else is also looking for the world's oldest animals-Zach Varmitech, who wants to discover the secrets to long life so that he can live forever. The Wild Kratts must protect the oldest creatures on Earth from Zach's scheme. Villains of the week: Zach Varmitech and Donita Donata (cameo) Animal names: Juice, Juice 2, Grandpa
101	9	"Spirit Bear"	Chris Kratt & Chris Roy	Chris Kratt	Chichagof Island (Southeast Alaska)	Spirit bear, American black bear, orca, earthworm, slug, pinacate beetle, ant, sockeye salmon	April 29, 2016	416
Chris, Martin, and Aviva kayak to an island to look for black bears. When they get there, Aviva catches a glimpse of a white bear; however, the Kratt brothers do not believe Aviva and tell her that there are no polar bears on the island. But when the white bear reappears, Chris and Martin realize that the bear is no polar bear-it's a spirit bear, a variety of black bear that sometimes has white fur. Meanwhile, a new villain, Paisley Paver and her assistant, Rex, arrive on the island, planning to pave it and build a mega storage facility. To stop this new enemy from destroying the bears' home, the Kratt brothers will need to use the incredible Creature Powers of the black bear. Villains of the week: Paisley Paver and Rex (mentioned: Zach Varmitech) Animal names: Bellyful, Paw Flip, Spirit, Spirit Jr.
102	10	"Panda Power-up!"	Chris Kratt	Chris Kratt	China	Giant panda	July 19, 2016	402
The Wild Kratts travel to China to conduct a population survey of one of Aviva's favorite animals: the giant panda. However, Zach Varmitech has plans to capture the pandas and make them into robotic stuffed toys. When Zach discovers that the Wild Kratts have arrived in China, he has his Zachbots drain the power from the team's technology, leaving the Wild Kratts stranded in the bamboo forest. To make matters worse, Zach captures Martin, who is testing the new Giant Panda Creature Power Suit, along with the real pandas. The Wild Kratts will need to use the bamboo-digesting secrets of the giant panda to convert bamboo into energy, "panda power up" their technology, and rescue Martin and the pandas from Zach. Villain of the week: Zach Varmitech Animal name: Stuffo
103	11	"Pangolin Rescue"	Chris Kratt	Chris Kratt	Tanzania, China	Ground pangolin, Chinese pangolin, plains zebra, termite, black rhinoceros, crested porcupine, impala, martial eagle, lion, ant, clouded leopard, malabar grouper, bluestreak cleaner wrasse	July 20, 2016	404
While on the African savanna, the Wild Kratts discover a ground pangolin. This animal, like other pangolin species, has one of the most incredible defenses in the creature world: overlapping keratin scales that make pangolins resemble artichokes on legs. However, the Wild Kratts soon get an alert from Chinese Wild Kratts kids Yi (Emilia McCarthy) and Duyi (Parker Lauzon) that someone has set traps to catch Chinese pangolins. The team travels to China to help protect these critically endangered creatures. The Wild Kratts soon find out who has set the pangolin traps: Chef Gourmand, who is trapping both ground and Chinese pangolins and plans to make "medicinal" smoothies out of their scales. The Kratt brothers must use Pangolin Powers to free all of the pangolins that Gourmand has captured. Villain of the week: Chef Gourmand Animal names: T. Rex, Artichoke, Nubs (from "Let the Rhinos Roll!"), Quillber (from "Quillber's Birthday Present")
104	12	"Golden Snub Nosed Monkey Man"	Chris Kratt & Chris Roy	Chris Kratt	Daba Mountains	Golden snub-nosed monkey, clouded leopard	July 21, 2016	410
The Wild Kratts travel to China looking for snub-nosed monkeys: primates capable of surviving in snowy mountains. However, the team soon must search for Martin, who not only gets lost in the mountains along with a baby snub-nosed monkey, but is transformed into a Yeti-like creature when his Snub-Nosed Monkey Creature Power Suit malfunctions. The other Wild Kratts are not the only ones looking for Martin either—Zach Varmitech plans to capture the Yeti and show it to people in exchange for money. Unfortunately for Martin, he is the closest thing to a Yeti in the mountains. Villain of the week: Zach Varmitech Animal names: Blue Goggle, Golden Ice
105	13	"Red Panda Rescue"	Martin Kratt & Chris Roy	Martin Kratt	China	Red panda, golden snub-nosed monkey, giant panda	July 22, 2016	415
Chris finds a lost red panda cub in the bamboo forest of China. The Wild Kratts wonder what taxonomic family this cute creature belongs to-Koki thinks the red panda is a bear, Jimmy Z thinks it's a canine and a type of fox, Aviva thinks it's a member of the weasel family, and Chris thinks it's related to raccoons. However, Martin reveals that the red panda is actually in a family of its own-Ailuridae. The Wild Kratts team plans to return the red panda cub to her mother, but Zach Varmitech arrives, traps Aviva, Koki, and Jimmy in an energy net, and steals the red panda cub, planning to give her to Donita Donata as a present for the fashion designer's birthday. Chris and Martin must use their Creature Powers of two Chinese animals-the snub-nosed monkey and the giant panda-to rescue the red panda cub from Zach and get her back to her mother. Villains of the week: Zach Varmitech, Donita Donata (cameo) Animal name: Lost-and-Found
106	14	"The Colours of China"	Martin Kratt & Chris Roy	Martin Kratt	China	Golden pheasant, red panda, giant panda, golden snub-nosed monkey, Lichtenfelder's gecko, Chinese moon moth	July 25, 2016	417
While Chris and Martin are looking for cool creatures in the bamboo forest of China, they encounter golden pheasants. The vivid colors of the male pheasant cause the Kratt brothers to wonder why golden pheasants-and all the other amazing animals of China-are coloured the way they are. But when Donita Donata captures several different species of Chinese animals and fades their colours, planning to use the now-grey animals as statues in a fashion show, the Wild Kratts must rescue the creatures and restore the animals' unique colours and patterns. Along the way, the team discovers the important roles that colour plays in the lives of animals everywhere. Villains of the week: Donita Donata and Dabio Animal names: Stuffo (from "Panda Power Up!"), Lost-and-Found (from "Red Panda Rescue"), Blue Goggle and Golden Ice (from "Golden Snub Nosed Monkey Man")
107 108	15 16	"Creatures of the Deep Sea"	Chris Kratt & Chris Roy	Chris Kratt	Atlantic Ocean	Giant oceanic manta ray, barreleye, Atlantic sea nettle, amphipod, goblin shark, black dragonfish, water flea, caridean shrimp, anglerfish, colossal squid, giant tube worm, vent shrimp, giant isopod, dumbo octopus, sperm whale, yeti crab, Scotoplanes globosa	November 23, 2016	425 426
The Wild Kratts use Aviva's newest transport to dive down into the deep sea for exploration and to potentially discover new life forms. Meanwhile, Gourmand, using a submersible borrowed from Zach Varmitech, descends down into the deep sea to find new creatures to cook. Then the Wild Kratts try to stop Gourmand from cooking deep sea creatures. In the process, they learn more about the deep sea. Villain of the week: Chef Gourmand, Zach Varmitech (cameo in a flashback, but has no dialogue) Animal name: Crazy Eyes, Dragon Glow, Snapjaw, Pulpo, Heat Seeker, (mentioned: Seasquatch [from "Seasquatch"]) Bumper's Mom (from "Whale Of A Squid")
109	17	"Liturgusa Krattorum"	Martin Kratt	Martin Kratt	Peru	Liturgusa krattorum, jaguar, black-headed spider monkey, European honey bee, turnip-tailed gecko, purple tree tarantula, violaceous trogon, streak-throated bush tyrant	January 16, 2017	401
The Kratt brothers find out that a scientist has discovered a new species of mantis in the Amazon Rainforest in Peru and named it Liturgusa krattorum, after them. They decide to creature adventure with this unique insect. Meanwhile, villains Zach Varmitech, Donita Donata, and Chef Gourmand are terrified that the mantis was named after the Kratt brothers instead of after them, so they decide to capture all of the Liturgusa krattorum. The Wild Kratts must rescue the mantises and get them back to "living free and in the wild". Villains of the week: Zach Varmitech, Donita Donata and Dabio, Chef Gourmand Animal name: Shadow (from "Shadow: The Black Jaguar")
110	18	"Snowy Owl Invasion"	Martin Kratt & Chris Roy	Martin Kratt	China, Northwest Territories, Maine	Snowy owl, giant panda, polar bear, northern collared lemming, walrus, snowshoe hare, Canada goose, American alligator, meadow vole	January 17, 2017	403
The Wild Kratts hear about snowy owls being sighted in areas far south of their usual Arctic habitat. The team decides to investigate, but trouble starts when Donita Donata decides to make hats out of the snowy owls. They then learn that the reason for this phenomenon is when prey is scarce in the arctic during the winter which leads to the snowy owls flying south to find more prey. Villains of the week: Donita Donata and Dabio Animal names: Frosty, Gold Nugget, Scoop, Stuffo (from "Panda Power Up!")
111	19	"Puffin Rescue"	Martin Kratt	Martin Kratt	Atlantic Ocean	Atlantic puffin, hawksbill sea turtle, common bottlenose dolphin, great white shark, Geoffroy's spider monkey	January 18, 2017	407
A rogue wave hits the Tortuga, separating the members of the Wild Kratts team from each other. When Martin is stranded on a remote island, he finds several puffins, giving him the idea to use Puffin Power to find and rescue the other Wild Kratts. Villain of the week: Zach Varmitech (cameo) Animal names: Puffo, Puff, Finnster, Mama Puffin, (mentioned: Grabsy [from "Bugs or Monkeys?"])
112	20	"Eel-lectric!"	Chris Kratt & Chris Roy	Chris Kratt	Amazon rainforest	Electric eel, harpy eagle, spectacled caiman, jaguar, red-bellied piranha	January 19, 2017	412
When the Tortuga crashes in the Amazon rainforest, the ship loses power when its electrical systems are damaged. However, Chris and Martin are happy to be in one of the most biologically rich habitats on Earth, and set out into the rainforest to creature adventure. The Kratt brothers soon find a creature that may be able to solve the Tortuga's electricity problem: the electric eel. They learn about how the electric eel uses its electric powers to catch prey and defend itself from predators like caiman crocodiles. However, they have to use their electric eel powers and fast when jaguars and crocodiles invade the Tortuga and terrorize Koki and Jimmy so the Kratts use eel defense power to scare them away; however, the Tortuga starts to sink into the Amazon River and the Kratts need to use their eel powers to power up the Tortuga. Animal name: Voltage
113	21	"The Mystery of the Two Horned Narwhal"	Martin Kratt & Chris Roy	Martin Kratt	Arctic Ocean	Narwhal, orca, American bison	January 20, 2017	413
Chris and Martin are arguing with each other about which is better, horns or antlers, when they get a call from Wild Kratts kid Nua about a whale with a unique hornlike tusk: the narwhal. The Wild Kratts travel to the Arctic to investigate the structure and purpose of the narwhal's tusk. But when the Kratt brothers find an Inuit carving depicting a narwhal with two tusks, the Wild Kratts decide to find out whether the two-tusked narwhal is real or just a myth. Animal name: Two Tusker
114	22	"Archerfish School"	Chris Kratt & Chris Roy	Chris Kratt	Borneo	Banded archerfish, giant mudskipper, Sunda clouded leopard, Draco lizard, Borneo python, Horsfield's tarsier, Sunda pangolin, Bornean orangutan, beetle, cricket	April 10, 2017	420
One day, while the Wild Kratts are in an Asian mangrove swamp, Chris is practicing archery. However, since his aim is not very good, he and Martin decide to check out the greatest archer in the creature world: the archerfish. The Kratt brothers learn about the archerfish's creature powers that allow it to hit small prey with jets of water. Aviva programs Archerfish Powers for Chris and Martin, and just in time too-Donita Donata is capturing animals for her new line of fashion, and the Kratt brothers will need to use the Creature Powers of the archerfish to stop the evil fashion designer. Villain of the week: Donita Donata and Dabio Animal names: Arrow
115	23	"This Orca Likes Sharks"	Martin Kratt & Chris Roy	Martin Kratt	Amazon River, Atlantic Ocean	Orca, jaguar, plumed basilisk, brown-throated sloth, Geoffroy's spider monkey, scarlet macaw, bull shark, mangrove snapper, brown pelican, yellowfin tuna, giant squid, great white shark	April 11, 2017	421
After a run-in with a dangerous bull shark in a South American river, the Kratt brothers find a bottle with an old map inside. The map shows the travels of a legendary orca that supposedly specializes in eating large sharks. To find out if the story of the shark-eating orca is true or not, Chris and Martin join a pod of orcas and use the newly-upgraded Dolphin Decoder to communicate with them. The Wild Kratts soon discover that orcas are powerful, intelligent predators that can prey on almost any other animal in the sea. But when a great white shark threatens an orca calf, the shark is eaten by none other than Old Sharktooth, the legendary shark-hunting orca. Animal names: Swirly, Old Sharktooth, Shadow (from "Shadow: The Black Jaguar")
116	24	"Baby Tooth & Kid Musky"	Chris Kratt & Chris Roy	Chris Kratt	Ellesmere Island	Arctic wolf, muskox	April 12, 2017	422
The Wild Kratts travel to the Arctic tundra, where two very different but interconnected creatures live: the thick-haired, sharp-horned muskox and its main predator, the pack-hunting Arctic wolf. Chris wants Aviva to make an Arctic Wolf Creature Power Suit, but Martin wants a Muskox Power Suit. Both Kratt brothers set out across the tundra to find their preferred animal, each trying to convince Aviva to program their chosen Creature Power Suit. However, when a pack of Arctic wolves threatens a muskox calf, Chris and Martin try to choose sides in the conflict, but realize that there really are no bad guys in a predator-prey relationship-the prey are trying to defend themselves, but the predators must kill or die of starvation. They then defeat the wolves. Animal names: Kid Musky, Baby Tooth
117	25	"Cheetah Adopted"	Martin Kratt & Chris Roy	Martin Kratt	Tanzania	Cheetah, plains zebra, Thomson's gazelle, aardvark, giraffe, martial eagle, African bush elephant, lion, common warthog, termite	April 13, 2017	423
The Wild Kratts need to resupply the Tortuga, but Chris and Martin want to have an adventure on the African savanna. Before travelling to a nearby town to buy supplies, the rest of the team drops the Kratt brothers-who promise not to call for help or ask Aviva for new Creature Powers-off on the savanna. But when Chris and Martin find Spot Swat the cheetah cub living with a family of warthogs, they must use their Creature Powers of African animals to get Spot Swat back to his mother, Blur, without having to contact Aviva, Koki, and Jimmy Z. Eventually, a lion threatens the cub so Martin and Chris use cheetah powers to save Blur but the 3 end up falling in a ditch and they eventually have to use aardvark powers to get out and reunite Spot Swat with Blur. Animal names: Spot Swat (from "Mimic"), Blur (from "Cheetah Racer"), Slurpy (from "Aardvark Town"), Necktie (from "Neck and Neck"), Mama Warthog
118	26	"Musk Ox Mania"	Chris Kratt & Chris Roy	Chris Kratt	Tanzania, Ellesmere Island	Muskox, Arctic wolf, black rhinoceros, Thomson's gazelle	April 14, 2017	424
While the Kratt brothers are being charged by an angry rhino on the African savanna, they decide to use a harpy eagle feather from Chris's creature souvenir collection to activate Harpy Eagle Powers and fly out of harm's way. However, Chris forgot his souvenir collection on the Arctic tundra (during the events of "Baby Tooth and Kid Musky"). To find the valuable collection, the Wild Kratts travel to the Arctic and search for the collection using the Creature Powers of the muskox. However, the team will have to hurry, because Zach Varmitech is also after the creature souvenirs. Villain of the week: Zach Varmitech Animal names: Baby Tooth and Kid Musky (from "Baby Tooth & Kid Musky"), Headbasher

=== Season 5 (2017–2019) ===
No. overall	No. in season	Title	Directed by	Written by	Country/region	Animals	Original release date	Prod. code
119 120	1 2	"Hero's Journey"	Chris Kratt & Chris Roy	Chris Kratt	Alaska	Sockeye salmon, salmon shark, orca, grizzly bear, bald eagle, Atka mackerel, sea otter, Steller sea lion, American black bear, gray wolf, American pine marten, North American river otter, American black bear, laughing gull, moose, dragonfly nymph	July 24, 2017	519 520
When Aviva's new Time Thruster invention gets attached to a migrating salmon, the Wild Kratts must follow the salmon run through the Alaskan wilderness to recover the Time Thruster. Animal names: Hero, Hero Jr, Little G, Mama Grizz, Little Howler (from "Little Howler"), Swirly (from "This Orca Likes Sharks")
121	3	"Mystery of the North Pole Penguins?"	Martin Kratt & Chris Roy	Martin Kratt	Antarctica, Arctic	Emperor penguin, leopard seal, Arctic wolf, polar bear, orca, Antarctic silverfish, Antarctic petrel, sardine	July 25, 2017	501
The Wild Kratts hear from Wild Kratts kid Nua that there are penguins in the Arctic, where the birds are not supposed to be. The team must investigate this mystery and get the "lost" penguins back to where they belong. They learn that the reason penguins do not live in the Arctic is that they are not built to deal with land predators there like Arctic wolves and polar bears. Eventually, they learn that Donita is the one that put the penguins there and demand she gives them the exact location where they came from. Villain of the week: Donita Donata and Dabio Animal name: Spinner
122	4	"Temple of Tigers"	Chris Kratt & Chris Roy	Chris Kratt	India	Bengal tiger, southern plains gray langur, sambar deer, common raccoon, snowshoe hare, mottled wood owl	July 27, 2017	502
Aviva manages to sneak up and surprise the Kratt brothers, as well as notice a raccoon that they failed to see. The Kratts then worry that they lost their signature "creature sense". To prove that they have not lost their "creature sense", the Kratt brothers head off in search of the stealthy and powerful Bengal tiger in India's jungles. However, Donita Donata is trying to make fashion accessories out of tigers, so the Kratts have to use tiger powers to save the Bengal tigers from Donita. Villains of the week: Donita Donata and Dabio Animal names: Camo, Queen Stealth, Baby Blue, Tackle
123	5	"The Dhole Duplicator"	Martin Kratt & Chris Roy	Martin Kratt	India	Dhole, Bengal tiger, southern plains gray langur, sambar deer, Indian leopard, Indian peafowl, sloth bear	November 6, 2017	503
In India, the Kratt brothers learn of a doglike animal called a dhole which is said to be able to chase away tigers. To see if this is true, they contact the Wild Kratts kid Mala and venture into the jungle. They then find a mother dhole with a pup; however, an Indian leopard threatens the dhole. Wondering how a small dhole can defeat a big cat like the leopard, they learn they use power in numbers and use their pack of dholes to outnumber the leopard. They then activate dhole powers but lose the pack, which proves dangerous when they encounter a large Bengal tiger who tries to eat them. And, since Martin and Chris are not enough to chase away the tiger, it pursues them. Then Aviva makes a duplicator machine that works for a few seconds but ultimately fails. Martin then makes a dhole call that summons the pack to come chase away the hungry tiger. Animal names: Little Red, Mama Dhole
124	6	"The Cobra King"	Chris Kratt & Chris Roy	Chris Kratt	India	Indian cobra, king cobra, Indian grey mongoose, green pond frog, dhole, Bengal tiger	November 7, 2017	504
While the Kratt brothers are in India, searching for Martin's lost Creaturepod, they encounter a spectacled cobra. Martin names the cobra Hoodie and the bros learn about the cobra's creature powers. They learn about how this snake can flatten its ribs into a hood, and learn about venom when it hunts a frog. Meanwhile an Indian gray mongoose shows up. Then Hoodie the cobra fights the mongoose and they learn about the mongoose's immunity to snake venom. Due to the mongoose's immunity despite being bitten by Hoodie, he is unharmed by the snake's venom (however, it is only partially immune; too much venom can be dangerous), and manages to kill Hoodie (and presumably eat him). They then get spectacled cobra powers and find the lost Miniaturizer; however, there is a Bengal tiger sleeping next to it. They try to scare it away using venomous snake powers but the tiger goes on the Miniaturizer. Meanwhile Aviva and Koki stumble upon a large female king cobra, the largest venomous snake in the world, and it has a nest, which is unusual among snakes. Aviva names the snake Queenie. This inspires Aviva to modify the Indian cobra powers to king cobra power. However, there is also a hungry male king cobra around which is bad for the bros as they have spectacled cobra powers and king cobras love eating other snakes. Eventually Chris gets caught by the king cobra and Martin has to activate king cobra powers to rescue Chris before his immunity meter gets high, and Martin ends up engaging in a fight with the male king cobra, which is clearly bigger than Martin. Chris rescues Martin by activating king cobra powers and trying to look bigger than the king cobra. They then get their Miniaturizer back from the tiger. The Kratts and the rest of the team go back to Queenie's nest and watch as the baby king cobras hatch. Jimmy gets scared and flies away without them. Animal names: Hoodie, Queenie, Princess
125	7	"Fire Salamander"	Martin Kratt & Chris Roy	Martin Kratt	Black Forest	Fire salamander, red slug, spider, earthworm, European hedgehog, American red squirrel, Eurasian lynx, red fox, white-tailed deer, peregrine falcon, European mink, wildcat, European polecat, beech marten	November 8, 2017	505
After seeing a salamander crawling out of a fire in the Black Forest, the Kratt brothers set off to solve the mystery of the fire salamander's life cycle. They also have to stop Donita and Dabio from capturing one thousand of them for her plan to make a fire-resistant dress, and even save Chris. Villains of the week: Donita Donata and Dabio Animal names: Flame and Sparker
126	8	"Cheeks the Hamster"	Chris Kratt & Chris Roy	Chris Kratt	Germany	European hamster, red fox, golden hamster, European polecat	April 23, 2018	506
When the Wild Kratts lose several Micro XT power chips in Germany, they decide to follow hamsters to see if the rodents find any of the chips. Animal names: Cheeks
127	9	"Wild Ponies"	Martin Kratt and Chris Roy	Martin Kratt	Assateague Island	Chincoteague pony, diamondback terrapin, dragonfly, Atlantic blue crab, housefly, Delmarva fox squirrel	April 24, 2018	507
When the Kratt brothers find a herd of wild horses on a beach, Aviva and Koki are eager to see them. However, the Wild Kratts are forced to retreat into the Tortuga when a storm hits. After the storm, the team finds a wild horse foal who was separated from the herd by a wave. Chris and Martin set off to reunite the foal with his mother. Animal names: Spooky
128	10	"Elephant Brains!"	Chris Kratt & Chris Roy	Chris Kratt	India	Asian elephant, African bush elephant, Indian crested porcupine, butterfly, aardvark, housefly, American crocodile, American alligator (in flashback)	April 25, 2018	508
The Wild Kratts travel to Asia to meet the Asian elephant and investigate the differences between it and African elephants. They discover Paisley and Rex and must use elephant power to stop Paisley. Villains of the week: Paisley Paver and Rex Animal names: Fingertip, Thornsley (from "Elephant in the Room"), Slurpy (from "Aardvark Town")
129	11	"Sloth Bear Suction"	Martin Kratt & Chris Roy	Martin Kratt	India	Sloth bear, Bengal tiger, southern plains gray langur, termite, peregrine falcon	April 26, 2018	509
While the Wild Kratts are in India, Wild Kratts kid Mala tells them about an Indian animal in danger: the sloth bear. Since the team does not know much about this unusual bear species, they decide to study it—but at the same time, they must rescue a sloth bear from Donita. They then learn about how sloth bears use suction power. Villains of the week: Donita Donata and Dabio Animal names: Shaggo, Shaggette, Shaggy Vacuum
130	12	"City Hoppers!"	Chris Kratt & Chris Roy	Chris Kratt	New York City	Red-legged grasshopper, American kestrel, rock pigeon	June 15, 2018	510
While the Kratt brothers investigate the creature powers of grasshoppers, Aviva and Koki help Wild Kratts kids Nolan and Sani build a catapult. Meanwhile, Donita Donata, Gourmand, and Paisley Paver visit Zach Varmitech's headquarters. Villains of the week: Donita Donata, Paisley Paver, Zach Varmitech, Gaston Gourmand Animal name: Catapult
131	13	"Blue Heron"	Martin Kratt & Chris Roy	Martin Kratt	Virginia	Great blue heron, smallmouth bass, Atlantic blue crab, green heron	June 15, 2018	511
While exploring marshes, the Kratt brothers find a heron, and the Wild Kratts team begins studying herons in order to create a Heron Creature Power Disc. However, Zach Varmitech, hoping for an opportunity to steal the Wild Kratts' technology, miniaturizes the Tortuga. Villain: Zach Varmitech Animal names: Blue Beaky
132	14	"Choose Your Swordfish"	Chris Kratt & Chris Roy	Chris Kratt	Atlantic Ocean	Swordfish, Atlantic blue marlin, Atlantic sailfish, shortfin mako shark, frigate tuna	June 15, 2018	512
The Wild Kratts study the similarities and differences between the three types of billfish: swordfish, marlin, and sailfish. They must also stop Zach Varmitech from capturing and selling all the fish in the world. Villain: Zach Varmitech
133	15	"Komodo Dragon"	Martin Kratt & Chris Roy	Martin Kratt	Komodo Island, Everglades	Komodo dragon, green anole, brown anole, wild water buffalo, osprey, wild boar (carcass)	June 15, 2018	513
Koki was in the Tortuga doing her daily villain monitor and found out that Gourmand was going to Komodo Island. Meanwhile the Kratts are in the United States, hanging out with brown and green anoles. The Wild Kratts travel to the island of Komodo to stop Chef Gourmand from cooking Komodo dragon eggs. To succeed, the team will need to use Komodo Dragon Powers. Villains: Chef Gourmand, Zach Varmitech
134 135	16 17	"Creepy Creatures!"	Martin Kratt & Chris Roy	Martin Kratt	Brazil, Tanzania, Outback, Pacific Ocean, Maine	Goliath birdeater, vampire bat, American Brahman, spotted hyena, bat-eared fox, thorny devil, Tasmanian devil, goblin shark, black dragonfish, jaguar, Geoffroy's spider monkey, aye-aye, Gila monster, Komodo dragon, gray wolf, anglerfish, yeti crab, little brown bat, eastern milk snake, European garden spider, Mentioned: king cobra	October 22, 2018	517 518
The villains are stealing scary animals from all over the world for a haunted house that they called the Scary Animal Mansion and it's up to the Wild Kratts and Wild Kratts kids must stop them and save their animal friends. Villain of the week: Zach Varmitech, Donita Donata, Dabio, Chef Gourmand, Paisley Paver, Rex Animal names: Goblin (from "Aye Aye"), Grabsy (from "Bugs Or Monkeys?"), Shadow (from "Shadow: The Black Jaguar"), T-Bone (from "Tazzy Chris"), Seasquatch (from "Seasqutach"), Dragon Glow (from "Creatures of the Deep Sea"), Little Howler (from "Little Howler")
136	18	"The Fourth Bald Eagle"	Chris Kratt & Chris Roy	Chris Kratt	Alaska	Bald eagle, American black bear, sockeye salmon, osprey, bufflehead	January 21, 2019	514
Martin and Chris help out when a bald eagle goes missing and try to stop Gourmand when he tries to cook it. Villain of the week: Chef Gourmand Animal names: Stars, Stripes, Downy, Little Sis
137	19	"The Erminator"	Martin Kratt & Chris Roy	Martin Kratt	Quebec	Ermine, black-capped chickadee, pileated woodpecker, snowshoe hare, blue jay	January 22, 2019	515
While Martin and Chris explore the powers of the chickadee, Martin encounters an Ermine and follows it to the Ermine's prey. Animal names: The Erminator
138	20	"Hercules: The Giant Beetle"	Chris Kratt & Chris Roy	Chris Kratt	Costa Rica	Hercules beetle, Atlas beetle, Geoffroy's spider monkey, bull frog, fly	January 23, 2019	516
While investigating exoskeletons, the Hercules beetle accidentally gets enlarged. Animal names: Hercules, Atlas

=== Season 6 (2019–2021) ===
No. overall	No. in season	Title	Directed by	Written by	Country/region	Animals	Original release date	Prod. code
139	1	"Mystery of the Flamingo's Pink"	Chris Kratt and Chris Roy	Chris Kratt	Caribbean	American flamingo, brine shrimp	April 15, 2019	602
When Aviva makes a flamingo power suit that turns white, the team sets out to discover how flamingos become pink. However Gourmand wants to take all of the shrimp so he can eat the brine shrimp which makes the flamingos pink. Aviva, Chris, and Martin must work together to save all of the brine shrimp. Villain of the week: Chef Gourmand Animal name: Pinkster
140	2	"Spots in the Desert"	Martin Kratt and Chris Roy	Martin Kratt	Sonoran Desert, Costa Rica	Ocelot, harpy eagle, margay, jaguar, elf owl, greater roadrunner, Sonoran collared lizard, antelope jackrabbit, coyote, Gila monster, western diamondback rattlesnake	April 16, 2019	603
The Wild Kratts receive a call from Manuel that an ocelot has been spotted in the desert. Animal name: Cookie and Elfis (from "Desert Elves")
141	3	"Deer Buckaroo"	Chris Kratt and Chris Roy	Chris Kratt	Kentucky	White-tailed deer, coyote, bald eagle, American black bear, gray wolf, golden eagle, American red squirrel	April 17, 2019	604
The Wild Kratts search for a white-tailed deer named Buckaroo as they learn about deer society and their antlers. Animal name: Buckaroo
142	4	"Wolf Hawks"	Martin Kratt and Chris Roy	Martin Kratt	Sonoran Desert	Harris's hawk, Harris's antelope squirrel, greater roadrunner, gray wolf, moose, antelope jackrabbit	November 4, 2019	605
While hiking through the Sonoran Desert, Martin encounters a Harris's hawk. Villain of the week: Zach Varmitech and Chef Gourmand (cameo in a flashback, but has no dialogue) Animal names: Wolfish, Wolfy, Hairy [mentioned: Little Howler (From "Little Howler")]
143	5	"Hammerheads"	Martin Kratt	Martin Kratt, Chris Roy, and Louis Champagne	Caribbean Sea	Great hammerhead, Atlantic blue crab, osprey, eyed flounder, southern stingray	November 5, 2019	607
Martin spots a hammerhead shark while diving in the ocean. Villain of the week: Zach Varmitech
144	6	"The Real Ant Farm"	Chris Kratt, Chris Roy, and Louis Champagne	Chris Kratt	Amazon rainforest	Leafcutter ant, black-headed spider monkey, eastern cottontail, domestic pig, phorid fly	November 6, 2019	606
Martin, Chris, and Aviva go on an adventure into the Amazon Rainforest, where they find a hidden world of busy leafcutter ants, farming for the colony. The team learns about agriculture in nature, and these ants must clip leaves to bring back food. Then later, Martin learns that leafcutter ants are fungus farmers. Unfortuntely, Zach wants to make robo-ants and steal all the veggies in the world so that everyone has to buy the veggies from him. The Kratts must stop him and save Scarlett's family farm. Villain of the week: Zach Varmitech
145	7	"Mystery of the Mini Monkey Models"	Chris Kratt, Chris Roy, and Louis Champagne	Chris Kratt	Amazon rainforest	Saddleback tamarin, emperor tamarin, pygmy marmoset, common marmoset, cotton-top tamarin, golden lion tamarin, harpy eagle, ocelot, Achilles morpho, scarlet macaw	November 7, 2019	608
The Wild Kratts team splits up to find mini monkeys known as tamarins and marmosets to discover why they have such weird hairstyles and bright colors. Villain of the week: Donita Donata, Dabio Animal names: Thumb, Pointer
146	8	"The Vanishing Stingray"	Chris Kratt, Chris Roy, and Louis Champagne	Chris Kratt	Caribbean Sea	Southern stingray, eyed flounder, Virgin Islands dwarf sphaero, common bottlenose dolphin, sand perch	November 8, 2019	609
A bored Martin and Chris decide to play a game of creature hide-and-seek, and search the sand flats for one of the greatest hiding animals in the ocean—the stingray. Villain of the week: Zach Varmitech Animal names: Smiley, Click and Whistle (both from "Speaking Dolphinese")
147	9	"In Search of the Easter Bunny" "Spring Bunnies"	Martin Kratt and Chris Roy	Martin Kratt	A meadow, Northern Woodlands of North America, Sonoran Desert	Eastern cottontail, snowshoe hare, antelope jackrabbit, pygmy rabbit, desert cottontail, mountain cottontail, pileated woodpecker, coyote, western diamondback rattlesnake, American robin, gadwall	March 30, 2020	601
The Kratt brothers split up; Chris heads north while Martin heads south in search of the species of rabbit or hare who they think is the real Easter bunny.
148 149	10 11	"Amazin' Amazon Adventure"	Chris Kratt, Chris Roy, and Louis Champagne	Chris Kratt	Amazon rainforest	Amazon river dolphin, giant otter, capybara, red-bellied piranha, golden-tailed sapphire, dyeing poison dart frog, military macaw, scarlet macaw, blue-and-yellow macaw, saddleback tamarin, emperor tamarin, squirrel monkey, Colombian red howler, bull shark, jaguar, ocelot, spectacled caiman, green anaconda, brown-throated sloth, electric eel, kinkajou, Achilles morpho, golden silk orb-weaver, Liturgusa krattorum, pygmy marmoset	April 20, 2020	617 618
When Aviva experiences an invention slump, the Wild Kratts team is determined to help. They take her down the mysterious Amazon River in search of inspiration from the amazing creatures that live there. But Aviva must reclaim her invention prowess fast, because Zach, Donita, Gourmand, and Paisley seek to mine the area's biodiversity for their own nefarious schemes. Villain of the week: Zach Varmitech, Gaston Gourmand, Donita Donata, Paisley Paver, and Rex Animal names: Blockhead, Snorty, Voltage (from "Eel-lectric")
150	12	"The Great Froggyback Ride"	Chris Kratt, Chris Roy, Louis Champagne	Chris Kratt	Amazon rainforest	Dyeing poison dart frog, squirrel monkey, leafcutter ant, Achilles morpho	July 13, 2020	610
The Wild Kratts are creatures adventuring in the Amazon when they accidentally get miniaturized again. A mischievous monkey makes off with the Miniaturizer and the team must rely on the creature powers of the poison frog, going on a wild froggyback (Chris back) ride to rescue the Miniaturizer, or stay mini-sized forever. Animal names: Roy G. Biv, Red, Orange, Yellow, Green, Blue, Indigo, Violet
151	13	"Parrot Power"	Martin Kratt, Chris Roy, Louis Champagne	Martin Kratt	Amazon rainforest	Scarlet macaw, blue-and-yellow macaw, military macaw, pygmy marmoset, golden-tailed sapphire	July 14, 2020	611
While flying over the Amazon rainforest, the gang share a bowl of colorful jelly beans. Martin tells them that the jelly beans remind him of parrots. This confuses everybody until he says it's because parrots come in almost every color. Soon the bros are off on a creature mission to find as many colorful parrots (including macaws containing their favourite colors) as they can in the Amazon. But they need to stop Donita Donata from stealing the macaw's feathers. Villain of the week: Donita Donata, Dabio Animal names: Squawk, Squeak
152	14	"Iron Wolverine"	Chris Kratt, Chris Roy, Louis Champagne	Chris Kratt	Norway	Wolverine, Siberian Husky, Norway lemming, caribou, gray wolf	July 15, 2020	612
When Chris sets up a massive cross country race in the North, each Wild Kratts team member must set off across the tundra with little more than one form of transportation and a small pack of gear. Along the way, each team is both helped and hindered by the greatest northern cross country traveler of all: the wolverine. Animal names: Gulo
153	15	"Adapto the Coyote"	Martin Kratt and Chris Roy	Martin Kratt	New York, Rocky Mountains, Sonoran Desert, Great Plains	Coyote, rock pigeon, American red squirrel, mountain cottontail, hawksbill sea turtle, meadow vole, Sonoran collared lizard, turkey vulture, ermine, blue jay	July 16, 2020	613
When a coyote pup sneaks into the Tortuga, the Wild Kratts want to learn why this creature is so adaptable. Villain of the week: Zach Varmitech Animal names: Adapto
154	16	"Tardigrade Xtreme"	Chris Kratt, Chris Roy, Louis Champagne	Chris Kratt	Tanzania, Antarctica, Atlantic Ocean, Sahara desert, the Moon	Tardigrade, giraffe, African bush elephant, lion, black rhinoceros, dumbo octopus, emperor penguin, dromedary	October 5, 2020	614
The Kratt brothers are curious to see if there is life on other planets; meanwhile, Jimmy Z discovers a tardigrade. The Wild Kratts crew travel around the globe and discover that tardigrades can live almost anywhere, from the ocean floor to the desert. Animal names: Gummy Bear, Thornsley (from "Elephant in the Room")
155	17	"Uh-Oh Ostrich"	Martin Kratt, Chris Roy, Louis Champagne	Martin Kratt	Tanzania	Common ostrich, black rhinoceros, giraffe, common warthog, blue wildebeest, Thomson's gazelle, cheetah, lion, African bush elephant, plains zebra, peregrine falcon, African collared dove, Macrotermes termite, secretarybird, greater kudu mentioned: spotted hyena, leopard, African wild dog	October 6, 2020	615
While cruising across the African savanna in the Tortuga, a gust of wind blows a piece of paper out of Aviva's hand and into an ostrich nest. The bros think it's a new secret formula and they spring into action to rescue her work from one of the most protective parents on earth: the ostrich. Animal names: Stretch, Stretch Jr., Nubs (from "Let the Rhinos Roll") Necktie and Necklace (from "Neck and Neck"), Thornsley (from "Elephant in the Room") Blur (from "Cheetah Racer")
156	18	"The Great Creature Tail Fail"	Martin Kratt, Chris Roy, Louis Champagne	Chris Kratt	Tanzania, Pacific Ocean, Alaska	Cheetah, giraffe, common ostrich, American red squirrel, plains zebra, Thomson's gazelle, housefly, tokay gecko, bald eagle, sockeye salmon, orca, laughing gull, gray wolf	October 7, 2020	616
When a stowaway red squirrel accidentally gets loose on the African savanna, the guys activate Cheetah Powers to catch her. Unfortunately, they run into major creature power suit malfunctions. The Tail Match Modulator is broken and producing a mismatched tail with every activation. In their quest to return the red squirrel home to North America, the gang discovers the amazing variety and diverse functions of creature tails along the way. Animal names: Tailer, Blur (from "Cheetah Racer"), Spot Swat (from "Mimic"), Okay the Tokay (from "The Gecko Effect"), Hero Jr. (from "Hero's Journey"), Swirly (from "This Orca Likes Sharks"), Little Howler (from "Little Howler")
157 158	19 20	"Cats and Dogs"	Martin Kratt and Louis Champagne	Martin Kratt	Serengeti, North America, Amazon rainforest, China, Sahara desert	Plains zebra, impala, black rhinoceros, lion, African bush elephant, giraffe, African wildcat, black-backed jackal, caracal, German Shepherd, Exotic Shorthair, domestic dogs, domestic cats, coyote, ocelot, margay, bush dog, cheetah, African wild dog, vulturine guineafowl, Nile crocodile, white-headed vulture, Egyptian cobra, African leopard, bobcat, gray wolf, bat eared fox, Bengal tiger, dhole, sand cat, fennec fox, clouded leopard, golden snub-nosed monkey, raccoon dog Computer image/video: Siberian Husky, red fox, red squirrel, dingo, Arctic wolf, jaguar	July 12, 2021	619 620
While the Kratt brothers are adventuring on the African savanna, they remark on numerous cats and dogs. Shortly, Wild Kratts kids from around the world begin asking the brothers about wild cats and dogs and whether they were dog or cat people. However, Zach, who has been secretly spying on them, has an idea to capture these creatures as "special" pets. Villain of the week: Zach Varmitech Animal names: Witty, Batsox, Swish, Splash, Pumpkin Face, Megafang Mentioned: Little Howler (from "Little Howler"), Little Red (from "Dhole Duplicator"), Baby Tooth (from "Baby Tooth and Kid Musky"), Adapto (from "Adapto the Coyote"), Spot Swat (from "Mimic"), Shadow (from "Shadow: The Black Jaguar"), Pounce More (from "Caracal Minton"), Baby Blue (from "Temple of Tigers"), Little Cubby (from "Bad Hair Day")

=== Season 7 (2023–2027) ===
No. overall	No. in season	Title	Directed by	Written by	Country/region	Animals	Original release date	Prod. code
159	1	"Outfoxed"	Chris Kratt, Louis Champagne	Chris Kratt	Canada, Antarctica	Red fox, American red squirrel, Basset Hound, bluegill, emperor penguin	May 22, 2023	701
While playing with acorns in his Creature Power Suit, Chris gets caught and carried off by a red fox, however, the Wild Kratts crew is always being "outfoxed" with Gourmand. Villain of the week: Chef Gourmand Animal names: Red Flash, Shy Guy, Sneaker and Pouncer
160	2	"Clever the Raven"	Martin Kratt, Louis Champagne	Martin Kratt	Canada	Common raven, rainbow trout, bald eagle, gray wolf, American bison, American crow	May 23, 2023	702
The Tortuga is parked in the Great North and some strange noises when the Wild Kratts set on a mission to clever the raven to resemble as a wolf pack. Villain of the week: Chef Gourmand, Donita Donata, Dabio and Zach Varmitech Animal names: Little Howler (from "Little Howler") and Clever the Raven
161	3	"Race to Goat Mountain"	Martin Kratt, Louis Champagne	Martin Kratt	Rocky Mountains	Mountain goat, Bighorn sheep, gadwall, grizzly bear, American pine marten, snowshoe hare, Canada lynx, wolverine, caribou, gray wolf, peregrine falcon	May 24, 2023	704
Chris and Martin enjoy to race the goat mountain with Goat Creature Powers to prevent Paisley Paver and Rex, then both challenged the race to the top of the Goat Mountain. Villain of the week: Paisley Paver and Rex Animal names: Big, Bang
162	4	"Owl Odyssey"	Chris Kratt, Louis Champagne	Chris Kratt	Quebec, Australia, Tanzania, Brazil, Siberia	Powerful owl, Pel's fishing owl, great horned owl, burrowing owl, barn owl, great grey owl, Eurasian eagle-owl, American red squirrel, grizzly bear, red fox, koala, raccoon, common bottlenose dolphin, hippopotamus, nine-banded armadillo, laughing gull, meadow vole, black-capped chickadee	May 25, 2023	703
When the Wild Kratts gets marooned and lost a world away from Tortuga, but the gang finds inspiration in several owls. Along the way, they encounter the continent except Antarctica until they get back home. Animal names: Hipster (from "Race for the Hippo Disc") and Nobody
163 164	5 6	"Our Blue and Green World"	Martin Kratt, Louis Champagne	Martin Kratt	Amazon rainforest, Costa Rica, Madagascar	Blue whale, Indri, Parson's chameleon, Indian peafowl, scarlet macaw, spider monkey, squirrel monkey, resplendent quetzal, green anaconda, catshark, river dolphin, nose-horned chameleon, blue jay, basilisk, Galapagos tortoise, green-breasted mango, proboscis monkey, shortfin mako shark, draco, jaguar, red howler, sloth, green iguana, capybara, ocelot, giant otter, red-bellied piranha, sifaka, pygmy mouse lemur, bluestreak cleaner wrasse, parrotfish, flathead grey mullet, slender seahorse, Atlantic goliath grouper, bull shark, long-spine porcupinefish, hawksbill sea turtle, krill, sakalava weaver, big blue octopus, yellowfin goatfish, bigfin reef squid	April 1, 2024	708 709
After disagreeing over which one is better, Martin and Chris discover the importance of blue oceans and green forests working together. The crew must get the brothers working together, and in due time to save the environment from Zach Varmitech and Paisley Paver's schemes. Villain of the week: Paisley Paver (last) and Zach Varmitech Animal names: Target (from "Chameleons on Target"), Grabsy (from "Bugs or Monkeys?"), Kabluey, Mambiky
165	7	"No Name Dream"	Martin Kratt, Louis Champagne	Martin Kratt	United States, Serengeti, Borneo, Sonoran Desert, Java Sea	Bornean orangutan, eastern box turtle, fossa, ocelot, bat-eared fox, coral catshark, lowland streaked tenrec, common seahorse	April 2, 2024	706
Martin goes on a mission to name all the baby animals that he had previously forgotten to. Animal names: Slider (from "Slider: the Otter), Two-Tusker (from "The Mystery of the Two Horned Narwhal"), Spaceship (from "To Touch a Hummingbird"), Arrow (from "Archerfish School"), Pulpo (from "Creatures of the Deep Sea"), Kid Musky (from "Baby Tooth and Kid Musky"), Little G (from "Hero's Journey"), Avalanche (from "Snow Runners"), Crocodilla (from "Mom of a Croc"), Maze (from "Zig-Zagged"), Target (from "Chameleons on Target"), Blobby (from "Mystery of the Weird Looking Walrus"), Spot Swat (from "Mimic"), Clingon (from "Lemur Stink Fight"), Blue Goggles (from "Golden Snub Nosed Monkey Man"), Grabsy (from "Bugs or Monkeys?"), Orange Juice, Shellvana, Snappy, Schmurtle, Bounca, Pokey (from "Tenrec Treasure Hunt"), Poka, Poker, Pokino, Pokolala, Nubs (from "Let the Rhinos Roll!"), Listen, Lick, Zippy (from "Flight of the Draco"), Orange Peel, Cute, Cuter, Snoozer, Curly Tail, Giddy Up, Goldie, Tickler and Kitten
166	8	"Backpack the Camel"	Chris Kratt, Louis Champagne	Chris Kratt	Gobi Desert	Wild Bactrian camel, Bactrian camel, goitered gazelle, Chinese scorpion, Rottweiler, domestic goat, Chinese pangolin, red panda, golden pheasant, Lichtenfelder's gecko, Chinese luna moth, giant panda	April 3, 2024	705
The gang goes on an expedition to discover the last remaining wild camels in the world. Villain of the week: Donita Donata, Dabio Animal names: Backpack and Knapsack
167	9	"A Fish Out of Water"	Chris Kratt, Louis Champagne	Chris Kratt	Borneo	Mudskipper, emperor penguin, proboscis monkey, monarch butterfly, calling fiddler crab, Asian water monitor, purple heron, dog-faced water snake	April 4, 2024	707
The Kratt brothers get stuck in the danger-filled world of a fish called the mudskipper, which can walk around on land. They need to find their creature power discs—without getting eaten. Meanwhile, Jimmy Z starts to feel a little unappreciated. Animal names: Skippy
168	10	"Salamander Streaming"	Martin Kratt, Louis Champagne	Martin Kratt	Appalachian Mountains	Northern two-lined salamander, spring salamander, hellbender, tiger salamander, marbled salamander, spotted salamander, blue-spotted salamander, American red squirrel, osprey, Big Sandy crayfish, fire salamander, human fish	November 4, 2024	712
Mysteriously, the Tortuga shorts and powers down while the gang is streaming a movie. Chris and Martin announce they can still do streaming—salamander streaming. The rest of the gang wonders, the brothers explain that salamander streaming is getting miniaturized and floating down a stream in tiny little boats looking for salamanders. It's a race to find as many salamanders as they can while Koki tries to fix the Tortuga. Animal names: Foldy Flappy Flaps
169	11	"Bumblezzz"	Martin Kratt, Louis Champagne	Martin Kratt	United States	Common eastern bumblebee, tiger salamander, house cricket, earthworm, convergent lady beetle	November 5, 2024	710
On a mini creature adventure, Martin and Chris encounter a hungry salamander and need to escape. Lost and unsure of their location, they ride a bumblebee, learning about it along the way. Unfortunately, they lose their adventure gear in the bee's pollen pockets. Meanwhile, Zach is capturing bumblebees, so the brothers activate bumblebee powers too and free the bees. Villain of the week: Zach Varmitech, Donita Donata, Dabio Animal names: Bumblezzzz
170	12	"Chimpanzee and Me"	Chris Kratt, Louis Champagne	Chris Kratt	Uganda	Chimpanzee, Doherty's bushshrike, Ant	November 6, 2024	713
The gang ventures into Uganda's tropical forests to explore the true nature of chimpanzees, but Chris sprains his ankle just as the climbing adventure begins. Upset and disappointed, he tries to hide his feelings and rely on his friends for support. Ultimately, it's a young chimp that teaches him how to embrace the situation and make the best of it. Villain of the week: Zach Varmitech Animal names: Gabby
171 172	13 14	"Activate Kid Power"	Chris Kratt, Louis Champagne	Chris Kratt	Rocky Mountains, Tanzania, Costa Rica, Australia	Common eastern bumblebee, hummingbird, bottlenose dolphin, humpback whale, great white shark, koala, peregrine falcon, grizzly bear, elk, red kangaroo, swordfish, sea turtle, laughing gull, giraffe, blue wildebeest, warthog, African collared dove, Thomson's gazelle, plains zebra, aardvark, honey badger, shelduck, black-capped chickadee, ermine, wolverine, Canada lynx, moose, northern cardinal, monarch butterfly, aye-aye, eastern gray squirrel, American quarter horse, Aberdeen Angus	April 7, 2025	TBA
When the Wild Kratts receive an overload of calls for creature rescues, their creature power capacity fails. The team is left helpless, but soon learn that by the working with Wild Kratts Kids, Kid Power is perhaps the most amazing and effective creature power of all. Villain of the week: None Animal names: Koala Balloon (from "Koala Balloon"), Lickster, Charger, Tip Top
173	15	"Mini Heroes and Mighty Mouths"	Chris Kratt, Louis Champagne	Chris Kratt	Caribbean Sea	Humpback whale, giant oceanic manta ray, phytoplankton, zooplankton, copepod, krill, amphipod, polyp	April 8, 2025	711
When the bros go on a mission in their Amphipod to understand the foundation of life in the ocean, they get swept up in the planktonic lifestyle. Despite their 'buddy system', they are lost in the hustle and bustle of the micro world. The gang must use what they learn about the great filter feeders of the ocean and the important concept of filtration in order to rescue the bros. Villain of the week: None Animal names: Victor, Betsy, PJ
174	16	"Moose Nibbles"	Martin Kratt, Louis Champagne	Martin Kratt	Canada	Moose, black-capped chickadee, North American river otter, American red squirrel, bald eagle, monarch butterfly, wolf, American black bear, North American beaver, American bullfrog, great blue heron, wood duck, blue jay, raccoon, wild turkey, red-legged grasshopper, common garter snake	April 9, 2025	714
The Kratt Bros decide to take a day off from adventuring by going camping. While setting up their tents, they meet a mischievous little moose calf who Martin names, Nibbles. However, Nibbles seems to have lost her mom. It's the Wild Kratts to the rescue, as they go in search of the missing moose and learn so much about moose along the way. Villain of the week: None Animal names: Slider (from "Slider the Otter"), Nibbles
175	17	"Shapes of the Armadillo"	Martin Kratt, Louis Champagne	Martin Kratt	Brazil	Brazilian three-banded armadillo, ocelot	October 6, 2025	718
The Kratt brothers find a sphere-shaped rock that turns to be a three-banded armadillo. They must use the armadillo's Creature Powers to defeat Zach Varmitech in a bowling match. Villain of the week: Zach Varmitech Animal names: Shapes, Mommadillo, Leatherjacket, Tippy-Toes
176	18	"The Butternut Tree"	Martin Kratt, Louis Champagne	Martin Kratt	Northeastern United States	Butternut tree, gray treefrog, black-capped chickadee, raccoon, great grey owl, American toad, eastern bluebird, pileated woodpecker, American marten, American red squirrel, eastern gray squirrel, white-tailed deer, Virginia opossum	April 20, 2026	720
Martin and Chris stumble upon a rare and endangered seedling of a butternut tree; while looking for its parent tree, they only discover dead ones. Villain of the week: None Animal names: Sticky Toes
177	19	"Duck, Duck, Loon!"	Chris Kratt, Louis Champagne	Chris Kratt	Northeastern United States	Common loon, common snapping turtle, North American beaver, North American river otter, great blue heron, smallmouth bass, moose, bald eagle, mallard	July 20, 2026	717
When Chris and Martin lose their gear to a snapping turtle, they get stuck mini-sized in a vast lake. Villain of the week: None Animal names: Slider (from "Slider the Otter"), Sticker, Bobber
178	20	"Like A Leopard"	Chris Kratt, Louis Champagne	Chris Kratt	Serengeti	Leopard, spotted hyena, impala, bat-eared fox, lion	January 18, 2027	719
Chris and Martin are delivering critically needed tellurium crystals back to the Tortuga when Zach tries to intercept their cargo. The brothers must borrow a few of the African leopard's talents in an effort to protect their cargo and complete their mission. Villain of the week: Zach Varmitech Animal names: Stealthazar
