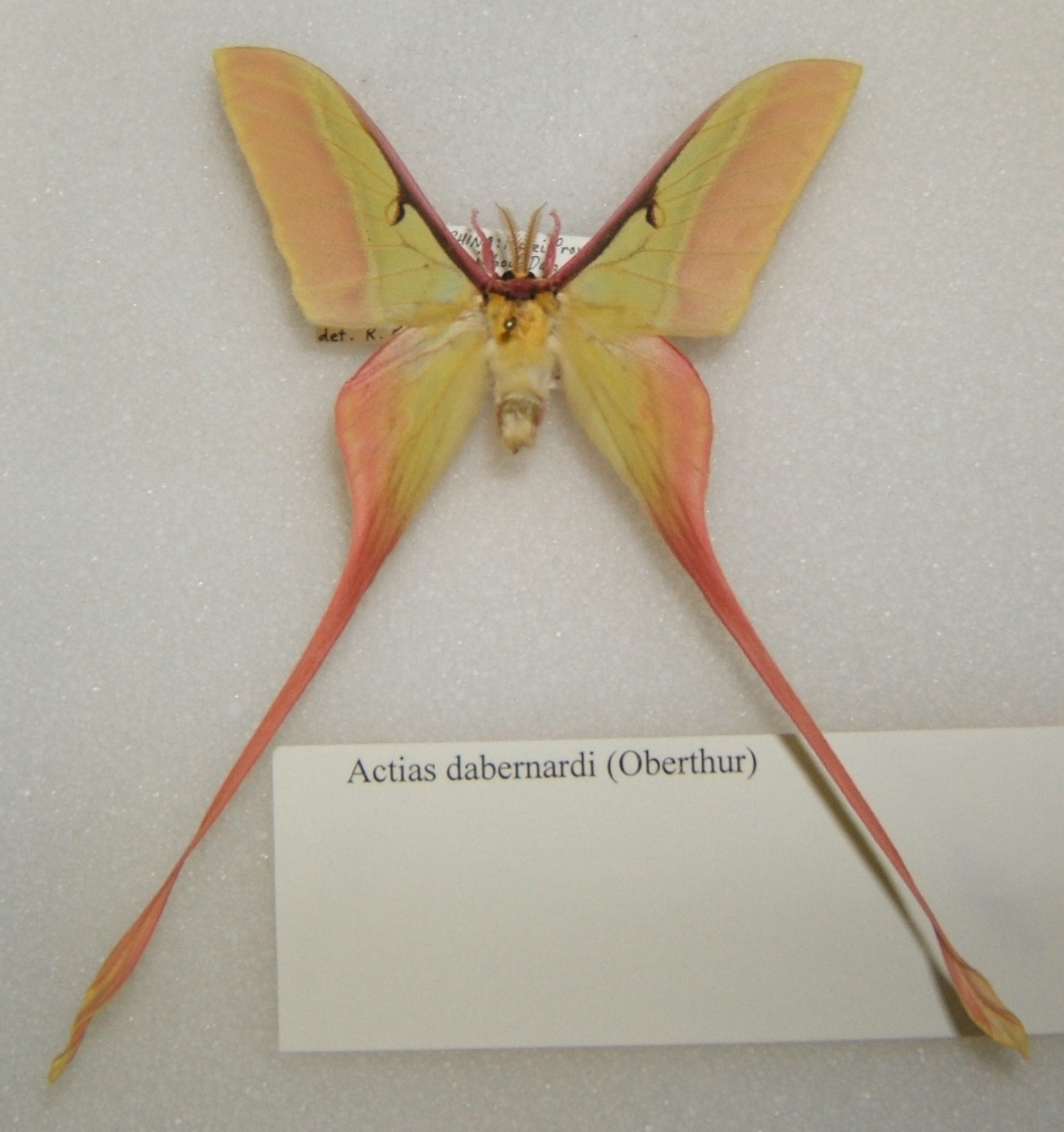
- Adult male
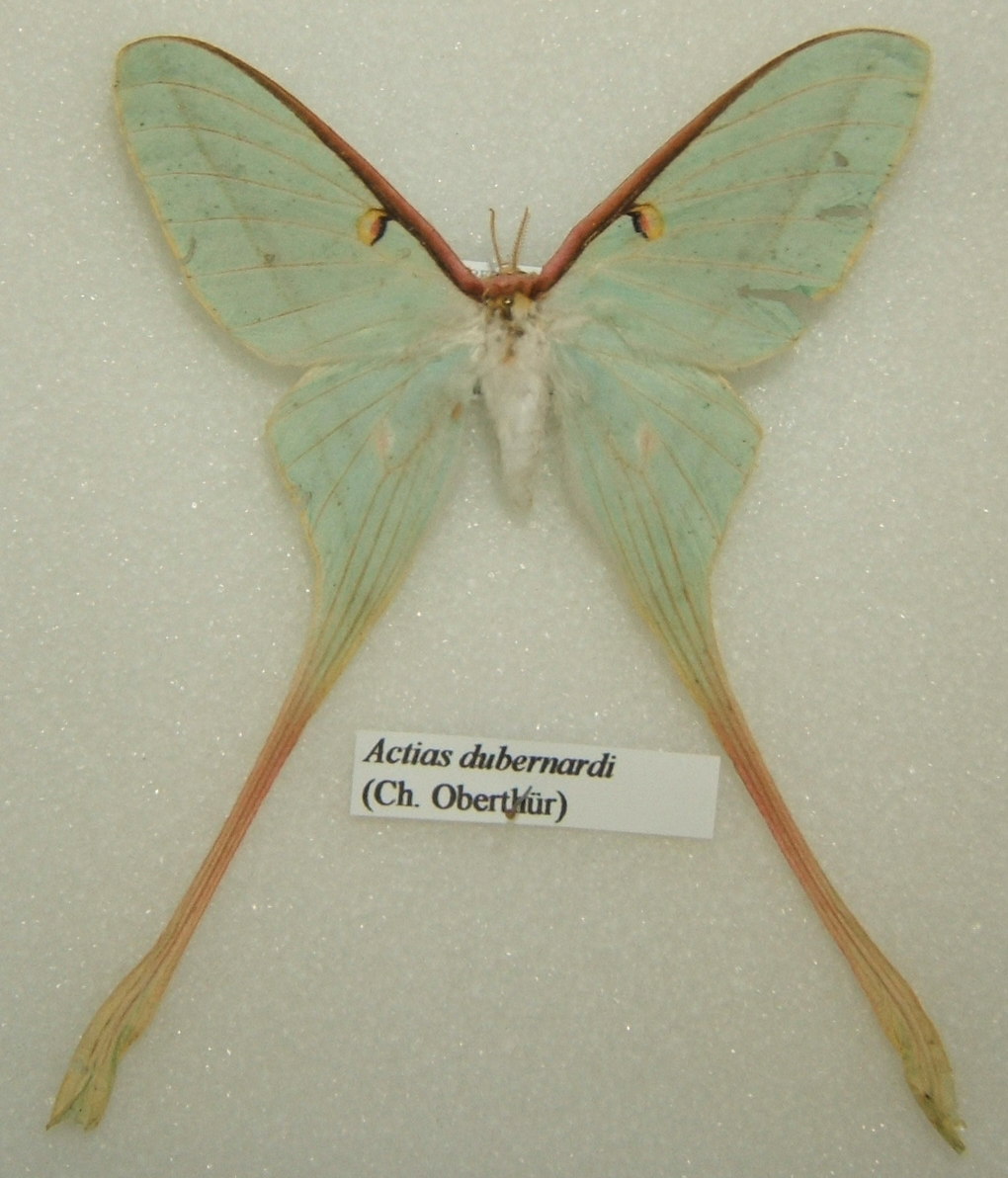
- Adult female

Scientific classification
- Kingdom: Animalia
- Phylum: Arthropoda
- Clade: Pancrustacea
- Class: Insecta
- Order: Lepidoptera
- Family: Saturniidae
- Genus: Actias
- Species: A. dubernardi

Binomial name
- Actias dubernardi (Oberthür, 1897)

= Actias dubernardi =

Species of moth

Actias dubernardi, the Chinese moon moth, is a moth of the family Saturniidae. The species was first described by Charles Oberthür in 1897.

== Range ==
This moth can be found in the Mountainous Forests of Southeast Asia, including large parts of China, Vietnam, Laos, Thailand, and potentially Taiwan. Their habitats are very humid, and can get quite cold at night, or winter. The Cloud Forests they inhabit are located from 1000 m to 2500 m above sea level.

== Life cycle ==
It takes 70–85 days to progress from an egg to the adult, depending on the temperature and humidity. The female releases pheromones that attracts the male so they can mate.

=== Egg ===
The female lays up to 120 eggs, and may place their eggs anywhere. The egg is oval-shaped, 1.5 by 1 millimetre (0.059 in × 0.039 in); whitish gray, and firmly stuck to branches or sides of the cage that the female had been kept in. Caterpillars, 4–5 millimetres (0.16–0.20 in) long, hatch after 10–14 days, the warmer and the higher the humidity, the quicker it happens.

=== Larva ===
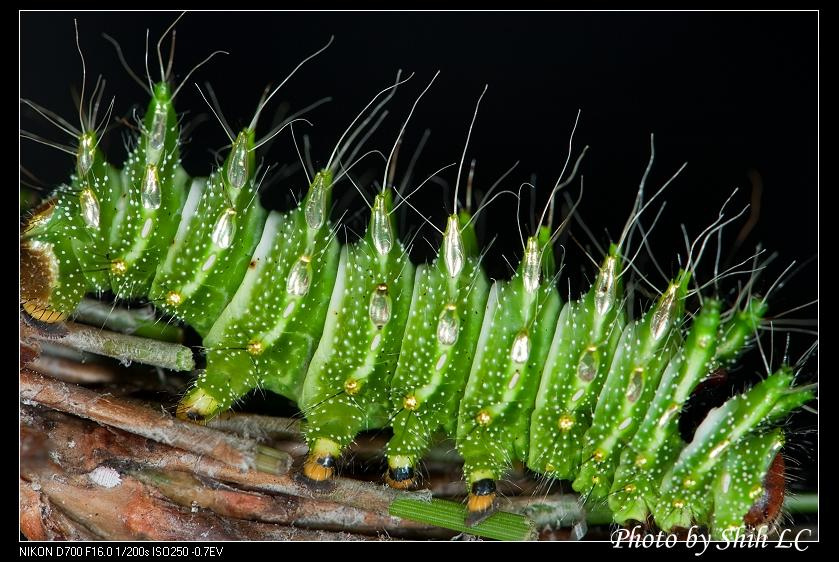
Larva

The newly hatched larva is black with hairs. It sheds its skin four times in its larval stage. In the first instar, it is initially black but becomes a deep red-brown as it grows. In the second instar, it continues to lighten to an orange-brown. In the third instar, it changes into a beautiful green with white stripes and silver/gold metallic reflective markings on the sides of the tubercles. Above the thoracic segments there is a stripe of white, black and red which can be opened and closed to show or hide the aposematic colouration. It is hairy in all its stages, and it feeds on pine trees. The fully grown caterpillar is 60–75 millimetres (2.4–3.0 in) long. It spins its brownish silk cocoon on the ground among moss or among pine needles. They are easy to rear as long as they eat in their first instar, and disease is avoided. The species comes from high mountainous regions, so it is quite cold hardy. It is best reared indoors, sleeved on a small pine tree.

=== Pupa ===
The pupa is about 35 millimetres (1.4 in) long, and the imago emerges from the cocoon after anywhere from about four to six weeks, depending on the temperature and humidity. In winter months, this development period can be prolonged until temperatures return to well above freezing, exhibiting a phase of diapause not unlike that of other high-altitude species.

=== Adult ===
An adult moth's life is short, no longer than 10 to 12 days (females live longer due to the fact that the female sits still waiting for a mate). Pairing is easy in a medium-sized cage. With one female and one to two males per cage. A beautiful hybrid with Graellsia isabellae was obtained by a team of French entomologists (D. Adés, R. Cocault, R. Lemaitre, R. Zaun and R. Vuattoux).

== Host plants ==
Pine tree - Pinus species. In the wild they eat Pinus massoniana. Caterpillars rather like Pinus sylvestris (Scots pine), but will also eat Pinus nigra (black pine) or Pinus strobus (white pine). Others have raised them on more, including Larix sp. and Pseudotsuga sp., but they did not give the best results.
