= Sonoran collared lizard =

There are two species of lizard named Sonoran collared lizard:

- Crotaphytus nebrius
- Crotaphytus dickersonae
