= Television show creator =

Person who makes radio or television programs

A television show creator or television program creator or television show maker is the person who developed a significant part of a television show's format, concept, characters, and pilot script. They have sequel rights to the material as well.

Often, the creator is also the showrunner or a producer. Sometimes it is a writer of the series bible, or writers' guidelines. In the United States, a Writers Guild of America (WGA) screenwriting credit system governs credits. For example, the Writers Guild of America West provides specifications for creator credits that govern its members. The Producers Guild of America's corresponding code for producers defines "Executive Producer" and similar roles but not an explicit "Creator" role.

"Creator" is a specific credit given explicitly in many shows. However, it has not always been a prominent, explicit credit. For example, Sydney Newman, the accepted creator of The Avengers (1961–69), was never given an explicit credit as creator; Newman never thought to ask for one.

The creator of a television show may retain rights to participate in profits, often to be paid by the production company as a percentage of fees that it receives from networks and distributors. In 2014, for prime-time network television shows, the WGA-required royalty to be paid to a writer with "created by" credit was approximately $1,000 per episode or higher.

Who merits creator credit is sometimes a matter of contention. In a 2013 legal case, a director sued a former writing partner for co-creator credit.

== Examples ==
Notable examples of creators include:

- Paul Abbott, created Shameless, and is also responsible for the creation of Reckless and Touching Evil for ITV, as well as Clocking Off and State of Play for the BBC
- J. J. Abrams, co-created Felicity (1998–2002), created Alias (2001–2006), co-created Lost (2004–2010), Fringe (2008–2013), Undercovers (2010)
- Britt Allcroft created the children's television series Thomas the Tank Engine & Friends (later re-titled Thomas & Friends), Shining Time Station (with Rick Siggelkow) and Magic Adventures of Mumfie
- Natasha Allegri, created the web series Bee and Puppycat turned into a television series on Netflix
- Gerry Anderson and Sylvia Anderson, co-creators of Thunderbirds (1965–66); Gerry Anderson also created Supercar (1961–62)
- Danny Antonucci, created The Brothers Grunt, Cartoon Sushi, and Ed, Edd n Eddy
- Maxwell Atoms, created Grim & Evil, The Grim Adventures of Billy & Mandy, and Evil Con Carne.
- Meredith Averill, creator and executive producer of The CW science-fiction teen drama Star-Crossed
- Craig Bartlett, created Hey Arnold!, Dinosaur Train and Ready Jet Go!
- Donald P. Bellisario, co-created Magnum, P.I., created Airwolf, created Quantum Leap, created JAG, co-created NCIS
- Rick Berman, co-created Star Trek: Deep Space Nine with Michael Piller, co-created Star Trek: Voyager with Piller and Jeri Taylor, co-created Enterprise (retitled Star Trek: Enterprise in 2003) with Brannon Braga
- Ben Bocquelet, created The Amazing World of Gumball.
- Loren Bouchard, co-created Home Movies (with Brendon Small), and created Bob's Burgers and Lucy: The Daughter of the Devil and co-created Central Park
- Ian Brennan, co-creator with Ryan Murphy and Brad Falchuk of Glee
- Jamie Brittain, co-creator with Bryan Elsley of British teen drama Skins (2007–2013)
- Marc Brown, created the television series Arthur
- Johnny Byrne, created Heartbeat and Noah's Ark (1997–98)
- Stephen J. Cannell, co-created The Rockford Files, created Baretta, created The Greatest American Hero, co-created The A-Team, co-created Hardcastle and McCormick, created Stingray, co-created Wiseguy, co-created 21 Jump Street, created Silk Stalkings, co-created The Commish, created Renegade
- Keith Chapman, created Bob the Builder, Fifi and the Flowertots, and Paw Patrol
- David Crane, co-created Friends (with Marta Kauffman), co-created The Class with Jeffrey Klarik, and co-created Episodes for the BBC
- Gábor Csupó, created Rugrats, Aaahh!!! Real Monsters, Santo Bugito, The Wild Thornberrys, Rocket Power, All Grown Up!, and Rugrats Pre-School Daze
- Greg Daniels, co-created King of the Hill, developed The Office, co-created Parks and Recreation, created Upload, and co-created Space Force
- John A. Davis, created The Adventures of Jimmy Neutron: Boy Genius
- Terrance Dicks, co-created the BBC science-fiction television series Moonbase 3 (1973)
- John R. Dilworth, created Courage the Cowardly Dog
- Bryan Elsley, created Dates (2013–) and co-created the British teen drama Skins (2007–2013) with Jamie Brittain
- Brad Falchuk, co-creator with Murphy of American Horror Story, co-creator with Ian Brennan and Ryan Murphy of Glee
- David Feiss, created Cow and Chicken, I Am Weasel and YooHoo & Friends
- Phil Ford, co-creator with Russell T Davies of Wizards vs Aliens
- Bruce Geller, created the television series Mission: Impossible (1966–73)
- Chris Gifford, created Dora the Explorer, Go, Diego, Go! and Dora and Friends: Into the City
- Vince Gilligan, created Breaking Bad and co-created Better Call Saul
- C. H. Greenblatt, created Chowder, Harvey Beaks, and Jellystone!.
- David Greenwalt, co-created Angel, co-created Profit, and co-created the drama Grimm
- Matt Groening, created The Simpsons, Futurama and Disenchantment.
- Jorge Gutierrez, created El Tigre: The Adventures of Manny Rivera and Maya and the Three
- Susan Harris, created Soap, Benson, The Golden Girls, Empty Nest, Nurses and The Golden Palace.
- Butch Hartman, created The Fairly OddParents, Danny Phantom, T.U.F.F. Puppy, Bunsen Is a Beast.
- Stephen Hillenburg, created SpongeBob SquarePants.
- Alex Hirsch, created Gravity Falls
- Mike Judge, created Beavis and Butt-Head, and co-created King of the Hill, The Goode Family, Silicon Valley, and Mike Judge Presents: Tales from the Tour Bus
- Emily Kapnek, created As Told by Ginger, Suburgatory, and Selfie
- David E. Kelley, created Picket Fences, Chicago Hope, The Practice, Ally McBeal, Boston Public, Boston Legal, and Harry's Law
- Jeffrey Klarik, co-created Episodes and co-created The Class with David Crane
- Chris Kratt and Martin Kratt, co-created the children's television series Kratts' Creatures, Zoboomafoo, Be the Creature, and Wild Kratts
- Glen A. Larson, created The Hardy Boys/Nancy Drew Mysteries, created Battlestar Galactica, co-created B. J. and the Bear, created Galactica 1980, co-created Magnum, P.I., created The Fall Guy, created Knight Rider, created Automan
- Norman Lear, created All in the Family, The Jeffersons, Sanford and Son, One Day at a Time, Maude and Good Times
- Roberta Leigh, created the puppet television series Sara and Hoppity, Torchy the Battery Boy, Wonder Boy and Tiger and Send for Dithers, as well as created Space Patrol, (American title: Planet Patrol)
- Steven Levitan, co-creator with Christopher Lloyd of Modern Family
- Christopher Lloyd, co-creator with Steven Levitan of Modern Family
- Craig McCracken, created The Powerpuff Girls, Foster's Home for Imaginary Friends, Wander Over Yonder, Kid Cosmic
- Patrick McGoohan, creator or co-creator of The Prisoner
- Carol Mendelsohn, co-creator and executive producer of CSI: Miami and CSI: NY
- Lorne Michaels, known for creating and producing Saturday Night Live
- Ryan Murphy, co-created Glee (with Ian Brennan and Brad Falchuk) and co-created American Horror Story
- Joe Murray, created Rocko's Modern Life, Camp Lazlo, Let's Go Luna
- Mic Neumann created Kung Faux
- Sydney Newman, created The Avengers and Doctor Who
- Jonathan Nolan, created Person of Interest
- Steve Oedekerk, created Back at the Barnyard and co-created Planet Sheen
- Van Partible, created Johnny Bravo
- Michael Piller, co-created Star Trek: Deep Space Nine and of Star Trek: Voyager
- J. G. Quintel, created Regular Show and Close Enough
- Paul Reiser, co-created Mad About You (1992–99)
- Rob Renzetti, created My Life as a Teenage Robot
- Shonda Rhimes, created Grey's Anatomy, Private Practice, and Scandal
- Sol Saks, created Bewitched (1964–72)
- Chris Savino, created The Loud House
- Mitch Schauer, created The Angry Beavers
- Michael Schur, co-created Parks and Recreation, Brooklyn Nine-Nine, created The Good Place.
- Adi Shankar, created The Guardians of Justice
- Sidney Sheldon, created The Patty Duke Show (1963–66), I Dream of Jeannie (1965–70) and Hart to Hart (1979–84)
- Genndy Tartakovsky, created Dexter's Laboratory and Samurai Jack, developed Star Wars: Clone Wars, co-created Sym-Bionic Titan and created Primal
- Jhonen Vasquez, created Invader Zim
- Mr. Warburton, created Codename: Kids Next Door
- Pendleton Ward, created Adventure Time, Bravest Warriors and The Midnight Gospel
- D. B. Weiss and David Benioff, co-created Game of Thrones (2011)
- Joss Whedon, created Buffy the Vampire Slayer (1997–2003), Angel (1999–2004), Firefly (2002–03), Dr. Horrible's Sing-Along Blog (2008), Dollhouse (2009–10) and Agents of S.H.I.E.L.D. (2013–2020)
- Tom Wheeler, created The Cape (2011)
- Toby Whithouse, created Being Human
- Dick Wolf, created Law & Order: Criminal Intent, Law & Order: Trial by Jury, Law & Order: LA, Law & Order: Special Victims Unit and Law & Order: UK., and created Crime & Punishment
- Justin Zackham, created FX drama series Lights Out
- Anthony E. Zuiker, created the CSI: Crime Scene Investigation franchise of several television series

== See also ==
- Showrunner
