= Kratt (disambiguation) =

Kratt is an Estonian magical creature.

Kratt may also refer to:

== Animals ==
- Liturgusa krattorum, a species of mantis also known as the Kratts' Lichen Mantis

== Media ==
- Kratt's Creatures, American children's television series
- Wild Kratts, Canadian children's television series
- Kratt, Estonian ballet by Eduard Tubin

== People ==
- Kratt brothers, American television presenters
- Kratt (surname)
