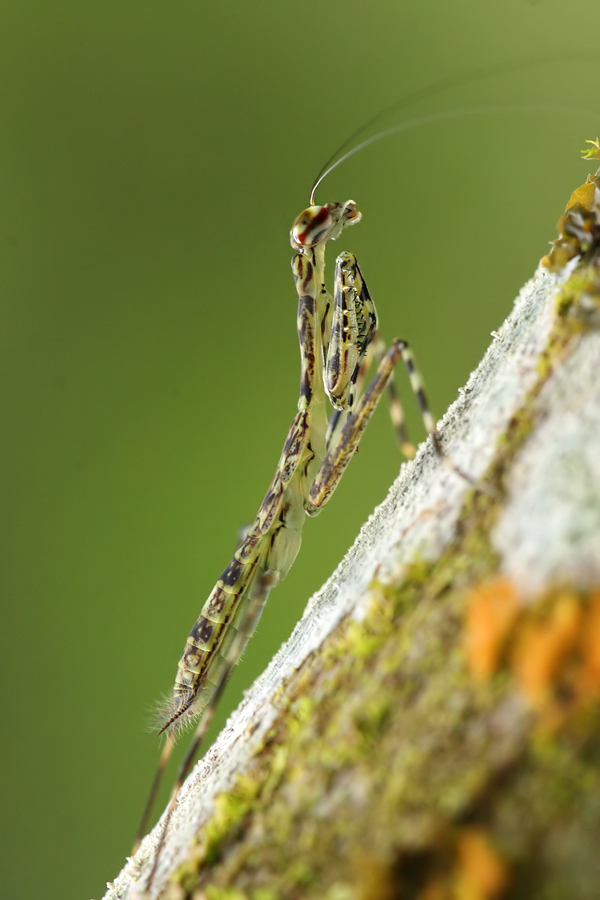

Scientific classification
- Kingdom: Animalia
- Phylum: Arthropoda
- Clade: Pancrustacea
- Class: Insecta
- Order: Mantodea
- Family: Liturgusidae
- Genus: Liturgusa
- Species: L. krattorum

Binomial name
- Liturgusa krattorum Svenson, 2014

= Liturgusa krattorum =

Species of insect

Liturgusa krattorum, also known as the Kratt Brothers Brown Bark Praying Mantis, is a species of mantis that was discovered by Gavin Svenson and the Cleveland Museum of Natural History in 2014. These species of mantis are mainly found in Peru. They live in tall trees, where they are preyed upon by predators such as birds, lizards and monkeys. The species themselves prey upon smaller insects, using their great speed in order to catch and kill prey in a similar method to species such as cheetahs. Ambush predator behaviors have also been observed. They are very small, at about only a few centimeters long.

The species was named after zoologist brothers Martin Kratt and Chris Kratt, the hosts of Be the Creature on National Geographic and Kratts' Creatures, Zoboomafoo, and Wild Kratts on PBS Kids.

== Wild Kratts ==
In 2017, a special episode of the PBS Kids' original show Wild Kratts with the same title as the scientific name of the mantis was released, which featured the animated counterparts of the Kratt Brothers adventuring with a member of the species. In the live-action closing of the episode, the brothers personally thanked Svenson for naming the mantis after them.

== See also ==
- List of mantis genera and species
