= Ron Rubin (voice actor) =

Canadian actor (born 1959)

- Born: May 12, 1959 (age 67); Winnipeg, Manitoba, Canada
- Occupations: Voice actor, writer
- Years active: 1986–present
- Agent: Dame Edna Talent Management

Ron Rubin (born May 12, 1959) is a Canadian voice actor and writer. His credits include X-Men: The Animated Series (Morph), The Avengers: United They Stand (The Vision), C.O.P.S. (Dr. Badvibes), Police Academy (Carey Mahoney), Beetlejuice (Doom Buggy), Stickin' Around (Mr. Lederhosen), Care Bears (Messy Bear), Kratts' Creatures (Ttark), and the English-language dub of Sailor Moon (Artemis).

Rubin also worked as a grip in Wild Kratts and as a writer for Fame, Sharon, Lois & Bram's Elephant Show, and Palmerstown U.S.A. He was personal assistant to Lewis Arquette and an extra in ALF in 1985. He is godfather to Martin Kratt's son Gavin, and emergency contact and power of attorney for voiceover artist Heather Bambrick. He was the executive in charge of the American documentary series The American Experience.

== Filmography ==
- Artemis in the DiC/Cloverway English dub of Sailor Moon
- Sgt. Slipper in the US version of Dennis the Menace
- Messy Bear in The Care Bears' Big Wish Movie
- Dr. Badvibes in C.O.P.S.
- Ttark in Kratts' Creatures
- Kaptain Skurvy and Jr. Klap Trap in Donkey Kong Country
- Bot-ler ("Olie's Bot-ler"), Lunchbox, and Announcer ("Lunchmaster 3000") in Rolie Polie Olie
- Barry MeNot and the Dragster of Doom in Beetlejuice
- Robo Fuzz in Monster by Mistake
- Carey Mahoney in the animated Police Academy series
- Various characters in Arthur, Angela Anaconda, Ned's Newt, Rolie Polie Olie, ProStars, Free Willy, Anatole, The Rosey and Buddy Show, Committed, Little Bear, Journey to the Centre of the Earth, Mischief City, Hammerman, Roboroach, Clifford's Fun with Letters, Ace Ventura: Pet Detective, AlfTales, Highlander: The Animated Series, Dog City, Knights of Zodiac, Tiny Toon Adventures, Corduroy, Redwall, Bad Dog, Dinosaucers, Bob and Margaret, Blazing Dragons, Freaky Stories, Rupert, Card Captors, Jacob Two-Two, Redwall, Cadillacs and Dinosaurs, WildC.A.T.S., The Adventures of Sam & Max: Freelance Police, Rescue Heroes, Babar, Pelswick, Hello Kitty and Friends, Keroppi and Friends, Little People: Big Discoveries, Hippo Tub Company, Beyblade, Watership Down, Traffix, Dex Hamilton: Alien Entomologist, Pecola, ALF: The Animated Series, Bakugan Battle Brawlers, Mini-Man, Stories from My Childhood, Grossology, Maggie and the Ferocious Beast, Little Rosey, Jayce and the Wheeled Warriors, Beverly Hills Teens, Maxie's World, Skatoony, Flash Gordon, Don Martin's MAD Magazine, Silver Surfer, Starcom: The U.S. Space Force, Moville Mysteries, King, The Count of Monte Cristo, Quads!, Medabots, Birdz, Franklin, Eckhart, My Dad the Rock Star, Undergrads, Girlstuff/Boystuff, Power Stone, 6teen, Cyberchase, The Super Mario Bros. Super Show!, Blaster's Universe, Mr Men and Little Miss, Pippi Longstocking, My Pet Monster, The Adventures of Tintin, Ultraforce, Slam Dunk, Power Stone, Jane and the Dragon, Wayside, Little Shop, The New Archies, Sylvanian Families, Interlude, Air Master, Noddy, Growing Up Creepie, The Adventures of Super Mario Bros. 3, Puppets Who Kill, Dumb Bunnies, Pandalian, What It's Like Being Alone, Delilah and Julius, Iggy Arbuckle, Chilly Beach, Miss Spider's Sunny Patch Friends, Toot and Puddle, Super Why!, The Future Is Wild, Magi-Nation, Wilbur, Bedtime Primetime Classics, The Wumblers, Spider Riders, Miss BG, Busytown Mysteries, Funpak, Gerald McBoing-Boing, Turbo Dogs, Monster Force, Spliced, Kassai and Leuk, Clifford's Fun with Numbers, Scaredy Squirrel, Franny's Feet, Willa's Wild Life, Jimmy Two-Shoes, The Manly Bee, The Amazing Spiez!, Get Ed, Diabolik, Uncle Joe's Cartoon Playhouse, Boom Unit, The Giggle Factory, Carl², The Ripping Friends, Captain Flamingo, Mysticons and The Day My Butt Went Psycho!
- Mr. White in Ruby Gloom
- Trell, Geezer Tree, and Lumber Loafer in The Neverending Story
- Axos in Mythic Warriors
- Dino Frog in New Tales from the Cryptkeeper
- On-camera guest appearances in Top Cops, The Emergency Room, Secret Service, Variety Tonight, Inside Stories, Comedy Club (TV Series), It's Only Rock 'n' Roll, Frances Farmer Story, Casby Awards, An Evening with the Arts and Young Again
- Trike in Harry and His Bucket Full of Dinosaurs
- Vision in The Avengers: United They Stand
- Rembrandt Proudpork in Piggsburg Pigs!
- Airball and Slyme in Stunt Dawgs
- Tanzog in Time Warp Trio
- Sprog in Atomic Betty
- Teenage guy in Young Again
- Glenn Miller in The Last Convertible
- Wayne in one episode of Katts and Dog
- Boogeyman and Brother Herman in Yin Yang Yo!
- Theo and Pico the parrot in the 1995 video game Laura's Happy Adventures
- The Comic in Kung Fu: The Legend Continues
- Manny in Totally Spies!
- Frenzel in Erky Perky
- Bat in Peep and the Big Wide World
- Jason McNulty in The Accuser
- Ladybug in Almost Naked Animals
- Raticus and Rod in Flying Rhino Junior High
- Morph in X-Men: The Animated Series
- Flinch in Di-Gata Defenders
- Mr. Lederhosen in Stickin' Around
- Himself in Sharon, Lois & Bram's Elephant Show Season 3 (Soap Box Derby) and Season 4 (Radio Show)
- Dr. Phelmholz in The ZhuZhus
- Master XOX in Sidekick
- The Blegh in Big Blue
- President Robert Kelly in X-Men '97

Preceded by None	Voice of Artemis; 1995-2000	Succeeded by Johnny Yong Bosch
