= Kratt (surname) =

Kratt is a German occupational surname. It denotes a basketmaker. Notable people with the surname include:

- Chris Kratt (born 1969), American biologist and television presenter
- Gavin Kratt (born 2001), Canadian-American rapper
- Martin Kratt (born 1965), American zoologist and television presenter
- Mary Norton Kratt (born 1937), American author
- Ronan Kratt (born 2003), Canadian soccer player
