= Television director =

Person who directs television programs

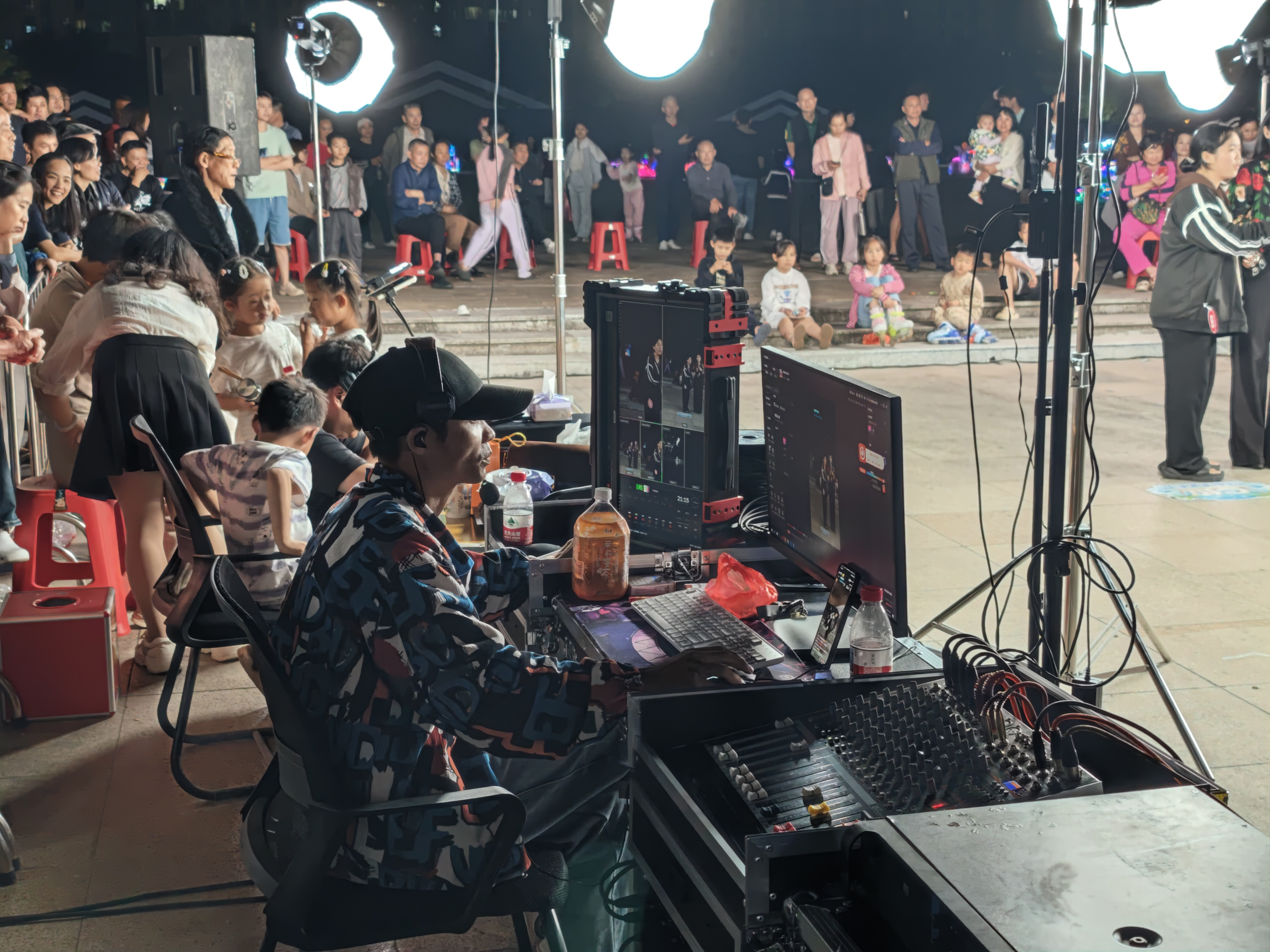
In a public square music competition, the director is responsible for storyboard, music and livestream.

A television director is in charge of the activities involved in making a television program or section of a program. They are generally responsible for decisions about the editorial content and creative style of a program, and ensuring the producer's vision is delivered. Their duties may include selecting cast members, conduct rehearsals, work with set designers, location scouts and art directors, originating program ideas, finding contributors, writing scripts, planning 'shoots', ensuring safety, leading the crew on location, directing contributors and presenters, and working with editors and music supervisors to assemble and make sure the final product meets the producer and director's vision. The work of a television director can vary widely depending on the nature of the program, the practices of the production company, whether the program content is factual or drama, and whether it is live or recorded.

== Types of television director ==
=== Factual television director ===
Factual or documentary TV directors may take any number of roles in the television production process, or combine several roles in one.

=== Entertainment television director ===
In a television show composed of individual episodes, the television director's role may differ from a film director's in that he or she will usually work only on some television episodes instead of being the auteur of the entire production. In an episodic television production, the major creative control will likely reside with the television producer(s) of the show. However, the director has input, whether it be how, if and why something can or cannot be done.

=== Drama television director ===
In a dramatic arts production, the television director's role can be similar to a film director's, including giving cues to actors and directing the camera placement and movement.

=== Live television director ===
Live television shows require a style in which a constant stream of instructions is given by the director as the show progresses, calling for various pre-recorded shots to be played, cueing presenters, communicating with camera and sound operators, and supervising the placement of professional video cameras (camera blocking), lighting equipment, microphones, props, graphics and the overall pacing and feel of the production. Other than quickly calling out commands, the television director liaises with the floor manager.

A news studio might have multiple cameras and few camera movements. In a sports broadcast, the director might have 20 or 30 cameras and must continuously tell each of the camera operators what to focus on.

While the director is responsible for specific shots and other production elements, the producer (typically seated behind the director in the second row of chairs in the control room) coordinates the "big picture", including commercial breaks and the running length of the show.

== See also ==
- Screenwriter
- Showrunner
- Television program creator
- Television producer
- Film director
