= Ronan Kratt =

Canadian soccer player (born 2003)

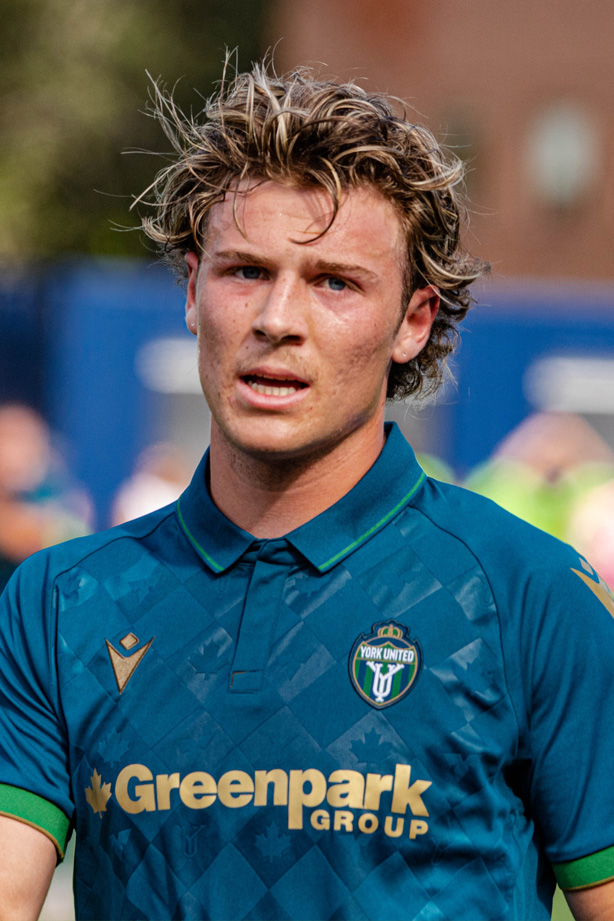
- Kratt with York United in 2022

Personal information
- Full name: Ronan Alan Kratt
- Date of birth: September 2, 2003 (age 23)
- Place of birth: Burlington, Vermont, United States
- Height: 1.78 m (5 ft 10 in)
- Position: Winger

Team information
- Current team: Pacific FC
- Number: 27

Youth career
- 2009–2018: Ottawa South United
- 2018–2020: Barca Residency Academy
- 2020–2021: Ottawa South United
- 2021–2022: SSV Ulm

Senior career*
Years	Team	Apps	(Gls)
2020	Ottawa South United	6	(1)
2022	SSV Ulm	1	(0)
2022–2023	York United	14	(2)
2023	→ Werder Bremen II (loan)	11	(0)
2023–2024	Werder Bremen II	22	(9)
2025–	Pacific FC	28	(5)

International career^{‡}
2022	Canada U20	1	(0)
- * Club domestic league appearances and goals as of October 26, 2026 ‡ National team caps and goals as of July 18, 2022

Ronan Alan Kratt (born September 2, 2003) is a professional soccer player who plays for Pacific FC in the Canadian Premier League. Born in the United States, he has represented Canada at youth international level.

== Early life ==
Kratt is the son of Laura Kratt and Martin Kratt, one of the Kratt brothers, who are American zoologists and children's educational television show hosts. They created and starred in shows such as Zoboomafoo and Wild Kratts, the latter of which Ronan appeared in as a child, along with his brother Gavin.

Kratt began playing youth soccer with Ottawa South United at age six, who were able to arrange multiple training opportunities in Spain with Spanish club Barcelona's La Masia academy. In March 2016, he had week-long trials with English club Crewe Alexandra and German club Bayern Munich. In 2018, he moved to the United States, where he played two seasons with the Barca Residency Academy in Arizona.

In January 2020, at age 16, Kratt committed to attending Carleton University and playing for the men's soccer team beginning in September 2021, turning down NCAA Division I offers. However, he ultimately did not attend Carleton, instead moving to Germany to join SSV Ulm's U19 side in the summer of 2021.

== Club career ==
In 2020, Kratt played with Ottawa South United in the Première ligue de soccer du Québec.

In the 2021–22 season, he spent most of the season with SSV Ulm's U19 side, but made one appearance for the senior side in the fourth tier Regionalliga Südwest on March 19 against Mainz 05 II as a late-game substitute.

On June 17, 2022, Kratt signed a professional contract with Canadian Premier League club York United, effective the beginning of July. He made his debut on July 8, starting the match against Forge FC. He scored his first goal in the next game on July 15 against Pacific FC. After the season, York arranged for him to go on a training stint with Werder Bremen II.

In January 2023, he joined Werder Bremen II on loan until July 1, with a purchase option that would activate if Kratt makes a certain number of appearances. Bremen would activate their option in June 2023, signing Kratt on a permanent transfer. On August 16, 2023, he scored a hat-trick in a 14–1 victory over Brinkumer SV. In December 2024, he requested and was granted a termination of the remainder of his contract and he returned to Canada.

On December 31, 2024, it was announced that he would join Pacific FC in the Canadian Premier League on a two-year contract with an option for 2027. On April 5, 2025, in the first match of the season, he scored a highlight reel goal, for his first goal with the club, in a 2-0 victory over Valour FC. In May 2025, he suffered an ACL injury causing him to miss the remainder of the season.

== International career ==
Being a dual citizen, Kratt is eligible to play for both Canada and the United States.

In April 2016, he attended a couple of camps at the United States Soccer Training Centre with the United States youth soccer teams.

In April 2022, he was named to a training camp for the Canada U20 team. He made his debut in a pair of friendlies that month against Costa Rica U20.

== Career statistics ==
As of July 1, 2025

Appearances and goals by club, season and competition
Club	Season	League			Playoffs		National cup		Other		Total	
Club	Season	Division	Apps	Goals	Apps	Goals	Apps	Goals	Apps	Goals	Apps	Goals
Ottawa South United	2020	Première ligue de soccer du Québec	6	1	—		—		—		6	1
SSV Ulm	2021–22	Regionalliga Südwest	1	0	—		0	0	—		1	0
York United	2022	Canadian Premier League	14	2	—		0	0	—		14	2
Werder Bremen II (loan)	2022–23	Regionalliga Nord	11	0	—		—		—		11	0
Werder Bremen II	2023–24	Bremen-Liga	17	9	—		—		1 (Note: Appearance in promotion play-offs)	0	18	9
Werder Bremen II	2024–25	Regionalliga Nord	5	0	—		—		—		5	0
Werder Bremen II	Total		33	9	0	0	0	0	1	0	34	9
Pacific FC	2025	Canadian Premier League	5	2	—		1	0	—		6	2
Career total			59	14	0	0	1	0	1	0	61	14

== Filmography ==
=== Television ===
Years	Title	Role	Notes
2011–2018	Wild Kratts	Ronan	Voice
