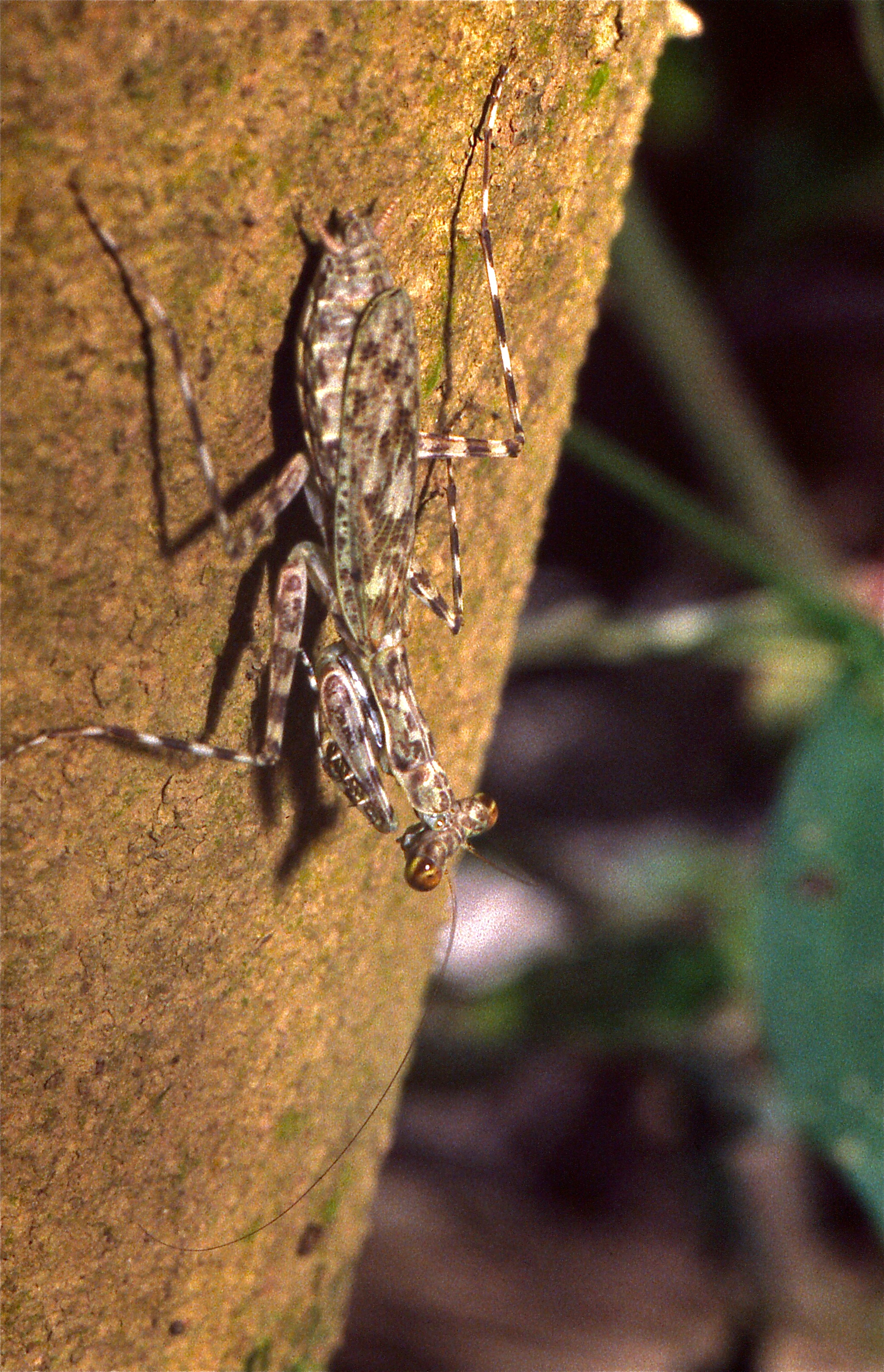

Scientific classification
- Domain: Eukaryota
- Kingdom: Animalia
- Phylum: Arthropoda
- Class: Insecta
- Order: Mantodea
- Family: Liturgusidae
- Genus: Liturgusa
- Species: L. maya

Binomial name
- Liturgusa maya Saussure and Zehntner 1894

Synonyms
- Liturgousa cayennensis [var.] maya Saussure and Zehntner 1894; Liturgusa maja Passerin d‘Entrèves, 1981

= Liturgusa maya =

Species of praying mantis

Liturgusa maya is a species of praying mantis in the family Liturgusidae.

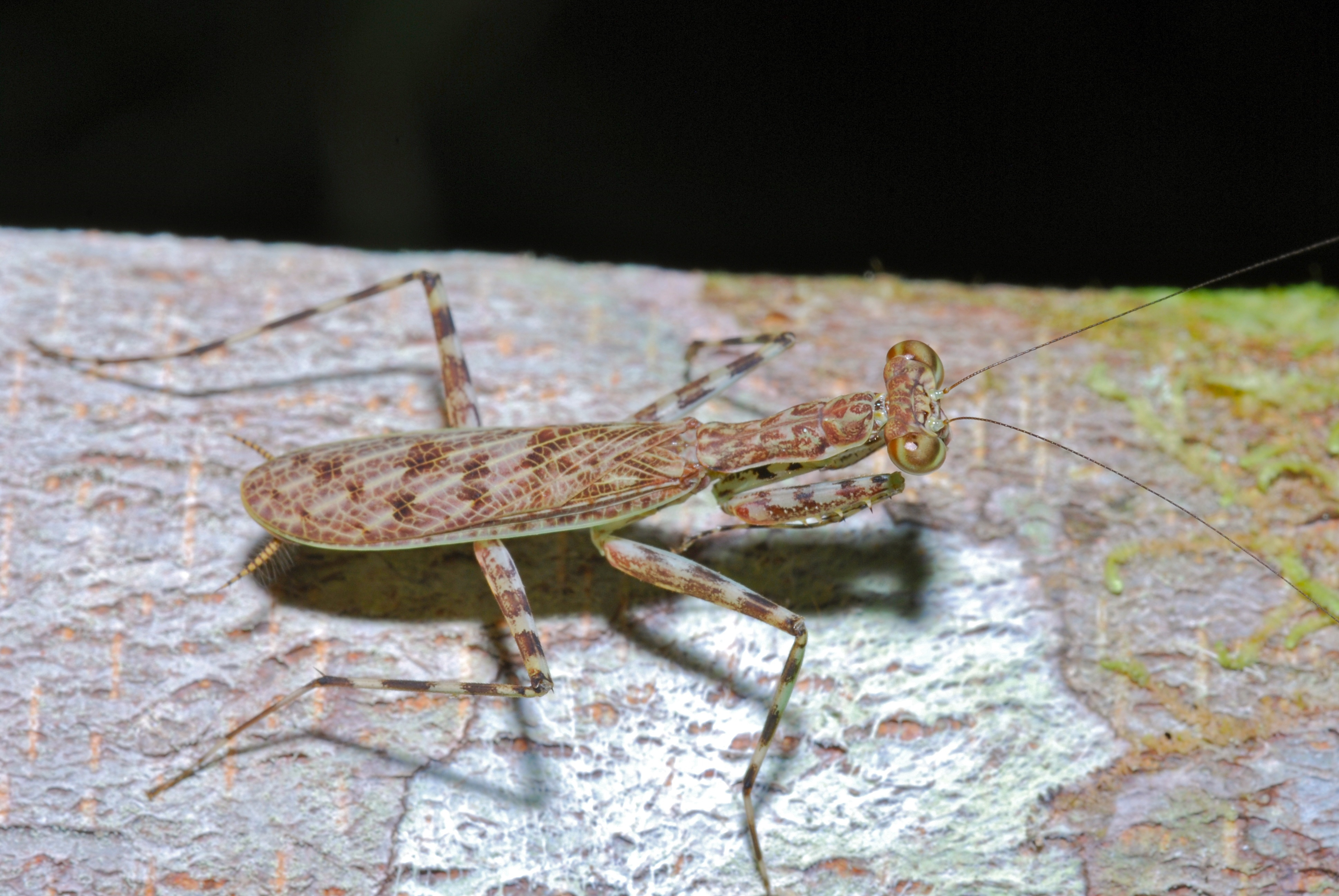

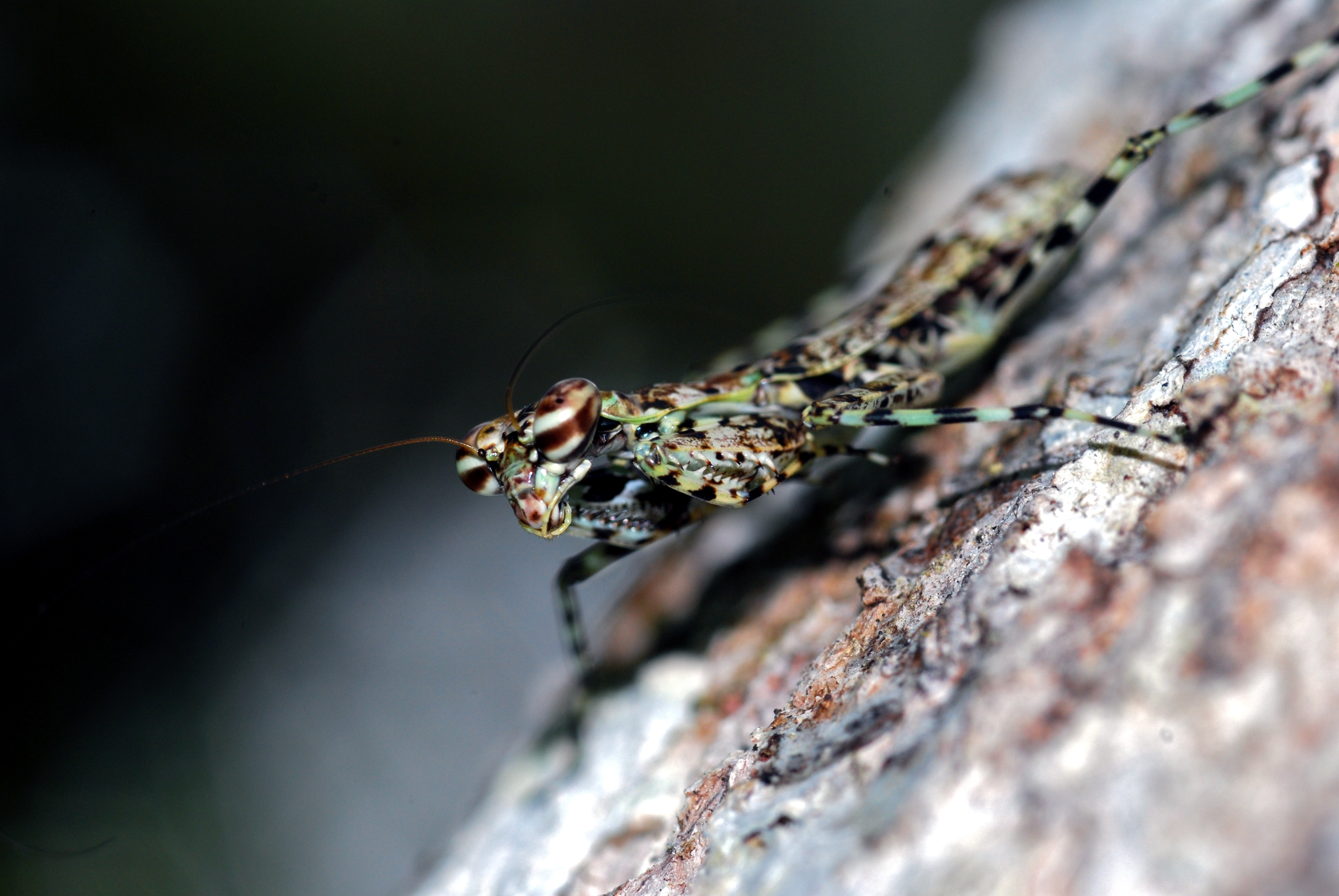
