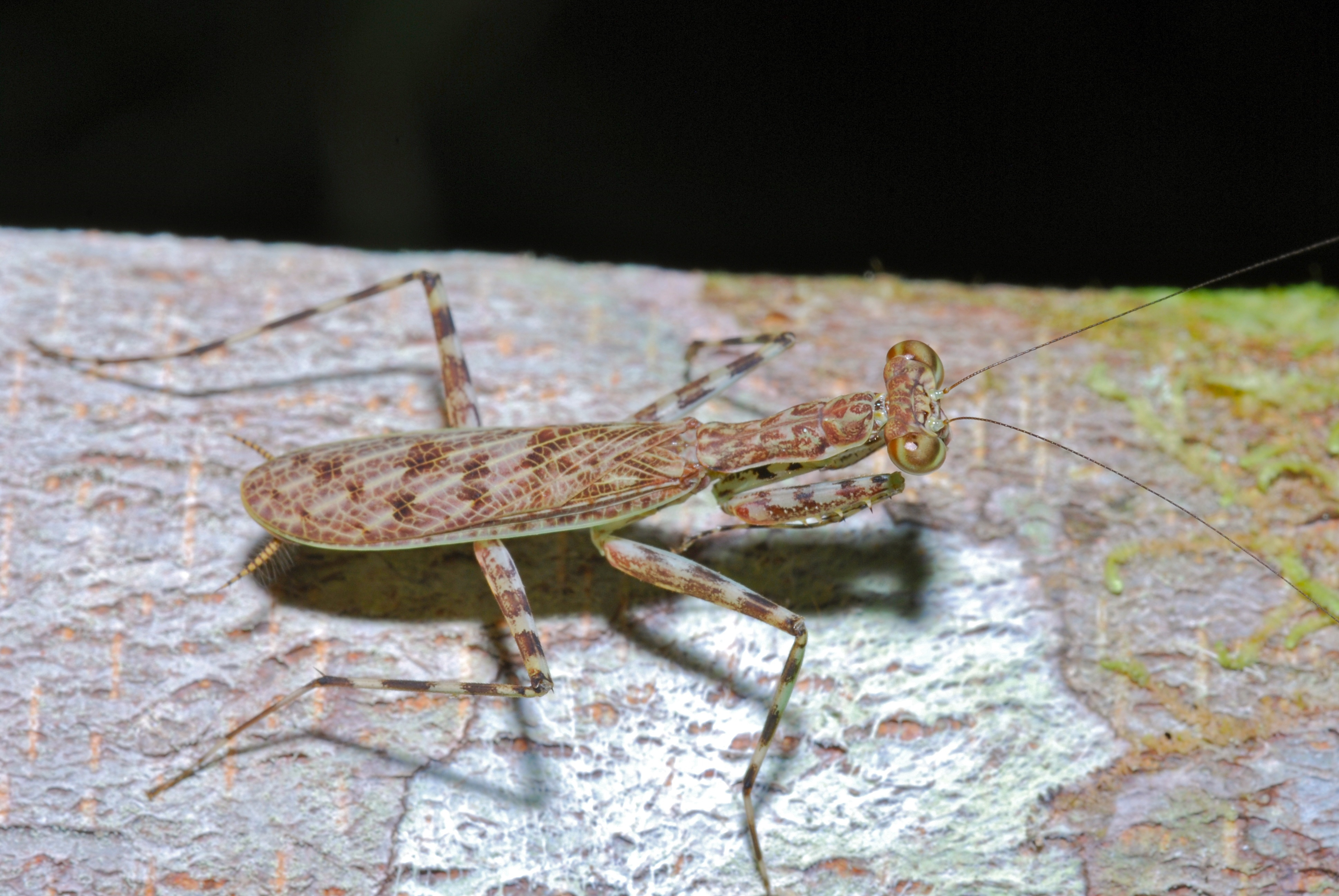
- Liturgusa maya

Scientific classification
- Kingdom: Animalia
- Phylum: Arthropoda
- Clade: Pancrustacea
- Class: Insecta
- Superorder: Dictyoptera
- Order: Mantodea
- Family: Liturgusidae
- Genus: Liturgusa; Saussure, 1869

Synonyms
- Liturgousa Saussure, 1869

= Liturgusa =

Genus of praying mantises

Liturgusa is the type genus of praying mantises of the family Liturgusidae. The genus consists of more than twenty species with a Neotropical distribution.

The behaviour of Liturgusa species is remarkable in that, in contrast to other mantises, they do not only ambush their prey, but also use an active hunting method at high walking speed.

== Species ==
The Mantodea Species File lists:

- Liturgusa actuosa Rehn, 1951
- Liturgusa algorei Svenson, 2014
- Liturgusa bororum Svenson, 2014
- Liturgusa cameroni Svenson, 2014
- Liturgusa cayennensis Saussure, 1869 - type species
- Liturgusa charpentieri Giglio-Tos, 1927
- Liturgusa cura Svenson, 2014
- Liturgusa cursor Rehn, 1951
- Liturgusa dominica Svenson, 2014
- Liturgusa fossetti Svenson, 2014
- Liturgusa guyanensis La Greca, 1939
- Liturgusa kirtlandi Svenson, 2014
- Liturgusa krattorum Svenson, 2014
- Liturgusa lichenalis Gerstaecker, 1889
- Liturgusa manausensis Svenson, 2014
- Liturgusa maroni Svenson, 2014
- Liturgusa maya Saussure & Zehntner, 1894
- Liturgusa milleri Svenson, 2014
- Liturgusa neblina Svenson, 2014
- Liturgusa nubeculosa Gerstaecker, 1889
- Liturgusa purus Svenson, 2014
- Liturgusa stiewei Svenson, 2014
- Liturgusa tessae Svenson, 2014
- Liturgusa trinidadensis Svenson, 2014
- Liturgusa zoae Svenson, 2014
