= Sterling Jarvis =

Canadian actor and singer

- Born: Digby, Nova Scotia, Canada
- Occupations: Actor, singer
- Years active: 1997–present
- Website: Sterling Jarvis (archived 2021-04-15)

Sterling Jarvis is a Canadian actor and singer. Originally from Nova Scotia, he currently lives in Toronto, Ontario.

He won a Dora Mavor Moore Award in 2012 for Outstanding Performance by a Male (Musical) for his performance in Caroline, or Change. He has also appeared on stage in productions of We Will Rock You, Of Mice and Men, The Lion King, Bruce Norris' Clybourne Park, Matthew Lopez's The Whipping Man and Lynn Nottage's Ruined, for which he garnered a Dora nomination in 2011 for Outstanding Performance by a Male in a Principal Role – Play.

On television he has had guest roles in Undergrads, The West Wing, The Eleventh Hour, 'Til Death Do Us Part, The Border, The Bridge, InSecurity, Warehouse 13, Covert Affairs, Suits, Lost Girl, Nikita, and Degrassi: Next Class.

Jarvis has also been an R&B songwriter and performer. With the group Spunkadelic, he cowrote the Juno Award-nominated 1990 single "Take Me Like I Am". He released a single, "Alone With You", on Canopy Records in 2011, and recorded the theme music for the television series Zoboomafoo and Wild Kratts.

Jarvis also provided the singing voice for Donkey Kong in Donkey Kong Country and for Ian Jones-Quartey's character Radicles in his Cartoon Network series, OK K.O.! Let's Be Heroes episode "Rad Likes Robots".

== Filmography ==
=== Film ===
Year	Title	Role	Notes
2006	The Sentinel	Post Agent #1	
2014	Wolves	Principal	

=== Television ===
Year	Title	Role	Notes
1997	Donkey Kong Country	Donkey Kong (voice)	Singing Voice; Uncredited; 25 episodes
2001	Undergrads	Additional voices	Voice; 2 episodes
2005	The West Wing	Secret Service Agent	Episode: "Freedonia"
2005	The Eleventh Hour		Episode: "Special Delivery"
2005	Felicity: An American Girl Adventure		Television film
2007	'Til Death Do Us Part	Officer Sears	Episode: "The Airplane Murder"
2009	The Border	Edouard Baseke	Episode: "Spoils of War"
2010	The Bridge	Ken	Episode: "Painted Ladies"
2011	InSecurity	Masud	Episode: "The Ligerian Candidate"
2011	Warehouse 13	Adam	Episode: "Trial"; Pilot
2011	Covert Affairs	General Oubash	Episode: "Half a World Away"
2011	Suits	Daniel Vega	Episode: "Play the Man"
2011	Life with Boys	Coach Luther	Episode: "Disarmed with Boys"
2012	Lost Girl	Vice Principal Dickerson	Episode: "School’s Out"
2012	Nikita	Secret Service Supervisor	Episode: "The Sword’s Edge"
2014	Aaliyah: The Princess of R&B	Michael Haughton	Television film
2016	Degrassi: Next Class	Mr. Powers	2 episodes
2017	OK K.O.! Let's Be Heroes	Rad (voice)	Singing Voice; Episode: "Rad Likes Robots"

=== Video games ===
Year	Title	Role	Notes
2017	South Park: The Fractured but Whole	Additional voices	
