= Stunt Dawgs =

Television series

- Genre: Action; Comedy
- Directed by: John Grusd; Michael Maliani; Blair Peters
- Voices of: Harvey Atkin; Barbara Budd; Neil Crone; Greg Morton; Ron Rubin; John Stocker; Greg Swanson; Lenore Zann
- Composer: Eric Allaman
- Countries of origin: United States; Canada
- Original language: English
- No. of seasons: 1
- No. of episodes: 40

Production
- Executive producers: Jeff Franklin; Steve Waterman
- Producer: Kevin O'Donnell
- Running time: 22 minutes
- Production companies: DIC Animation City; Rainforest Entertainment; Franklin/Waterman 2

Original release
- Network: Syndication
- Release: September 28, 1992 – June 28, 1993

Stunt Dawgs is a 1992–93 animated comedic adventure series. Based on the 1978 film Hooper, the series was produced by DIC Animation City, Rainforest Entertainment and Franklin/Waterman 2 and co-executive produced by Jeff Franklin, best known for creating Full House.

A one-shot comic adaptation released by Harvey Comics in March 1993 was written by Michael Gallagher and drawn by Nelson Dewey, who worked from scripts and model sheets from the series.

== Overview ==
The show is about a team of Hollywood stunt performers and their bulldog named Human who also solve crimes and battle villains. The villains in question are invariably an insane director called Richard P. Fungus and his band of unscrupulous stunt performers, the Stunt Scabs.

== Characters ==
=== Stunt Dawgs ===
The Stunt Dawgs are the titular protagonists of the show. They are a team of crime-fighting stunt performers. Their team vehicle is Fat Cat and their base of operations is The Wreck.

- Needham is the leader of the Stunt Dawgs and the main character and level-headed hero of the series, with an exaggeratedly large chest and chin. He speaks with a Texan accent and has his own theme, which is played in the end credits in some episodes and heard in an instrumental form throughout the series. Needham's main battle cry is "T.T.K.B.", which means "Time To Kick Butt". Another of his battle cries is "I loooove being a Stunt Dawg", which he uses when he is enjoying himself, either doing a stunt or foiling one of Fungus's plans. His vehicle is a six-wheeled monster truck whose name is Oscar (as seen on the tailgate). It can get through traffic jams by rising high and thinning its tires, and can also fly long distances by rising on its chassis and firing rocket engines from the back, as seen in the episode "Calling Dr. Fungus". Needham was named after former stuntman/director Hal Needham (who also directed Hooper). In the comic, he is sometimes depicted with black hair and a yellow sleeveless shirt instead of brown hair and a white T-shirt with red trim.
- Splat is the rich, laid-back financier of the Stunt Dawgs who speaks with a posh accent, denoting his cultured upbringing from a wealthy family. His parents disapprove of his choice of profession. His real name, which is first used in the episode "Jailhouse Dawgs", is Gordon Gillis Wellington III; in "Rich Dawg, Poor Dawg", Slyme calls him Gordon Gillis Wheeler Wellington III. His vehicle is the Crash & Burn, a military-style helicopter.
- Sizzle is the only female member of the Stunt Dawgs, with fiery red hair and a temper to match. She wears purple spandex, speaks with a Southern accent similar to Rogue of the X-Men (who was also voiced by Zann in the animated series), and carries a pocket-sized flamethrower. She occasionally flirts with Needham and is revealed to have some sort of history with Fungus's brother. Her vehicle is a racecar-like pink car with giant rear tires.
- Skidd is an "almost crazy" motorcycle driver who is often found pondering near-nonsensical themes. He is known for his terrible breath and loud burps. His vehicle is the Sidewinder, a yellow motorcycle with folding wings and purple tires. In the comic, he is sometimes depicted with black hair and a red jacket instead of red hair and a black jacket, and a more suave appearance overall.
- Crash is a bald African-American stunt driver who (as his name suggests) is known for getting into accidents. He is also often found running away from Velda, who has a crush on him. His vehicle is Bullet, a red and white rocket car with giant rear tires like Sizzle's.
- Human is the Stunt Dawgs' rather intelligent bulldog. His vehicle is a rocket-powered skateboard that appears occasionally on the show; whenever he launches from The Wreck, he lands dazed in a dumpster.

=== Stunt Scabs ===
The Stunt Scabs are the antagonists of the show. They are a gang of stunt performers whose goal is the destruction of the Stunt Dawgs. Their team vehicle and mobile base of operations is the Roller.

- Richard P. Fungus is the primary villain of the show. He is an egomaniacal director who serves as the Stunt Scabs' boss and is obsessed with pursuing money, fame, and the destruction of the Stunt Dawgs. His battle cry is "Lights, Camera, Mayhem!!!" He is also known for exclaiming, "I despise him!" He hates nothing more in all the world than to be called "Dick". He wears a toupée and is revealed in the episode "Viva Lost Wages" to have a charismatic but insane brother, who is imprisoned in an asylum and looks to escape so he can commit fratricide. Fungus was originally to have been named "Peter Bogus", allegedly a parody of director Peter Bogdanovich. He also appears at the end of most shows in the Franklin/Waterman Entertainment logo. His vehicle is the Fungusmobile, a production truck with a robotic arm that mounts a movie camera (which doubles as a laser cannon).
- Airball (sometimes Hairball) is Fungus's short-statured second-in-command who imitates Napoleon Bonaparte, frequently calling Fungus "Mon capitan". His attempts to get on Fungus's good side are frequently shot down with Fungus screaming at him "Shut up, you suck-up!" (which is often followed by a nonsensical insult such as "You piece of elephant cheese!"), and Fungus usually takes out his frustration on Airball when things go wrong. His vehicle is Airblast, a light blue airplane with an open canopy. In the comic, Fungus introduces him as "a skydiver who's had a few rough landings".
- Badyear is a large, brawny construction worker with a rattlesnake for a belt. He appears to have a lead foot (literally, a right foot made of lead), but in "Badyear's Billions", it is shown to be a boot that covers a normal-looking right foot. He is frugal to the point of being cheap, always trying to extort money from others and cadge rewards for even the most minor services, and his voice is similar to the one Atkin used for King Koopa in The Super Mario Bros. Super Show!, The Adventures of Super Mario Bros. 3, and Super Mario World. His vehicle is the Blimp, a blue monster truck with purple tires that sports a cannon called the Blimpzooka and a movable, jaw-like front bumper as well.
- Half-A-Mind is barely a human being and apparently a cyborg of some kind (with a wheel for a leg). He is prone to falling apart after getting hit and has the lowest intelligence in the group. He is briefly infused with intelligence in one episode, calling himself "Mind-And-A-Half"? taking over the Stunt Scabs and appointing Whiz Vid - who upgraded Half-A-Mind's body with high intellect and new cybernetic body parts - his second-in-command and personal assistant. His vehicle is the Halfback, a light green motorized tricycle.
- Lucky is a bushy-browed guy who is unquestioningly loyal to Fungus. He is only slightly more intelligent than Half-A-Mind and suffers from luck of the worst kind. He always looks at his fortunes optimistically with his catchphrase "Could've been worse", although they often get worse immediately after he says it. Ironically (or maybe not), Friday the 13th is his luckiest day. His vehicle is the Scorpion, a light green motorcycle with (as its name implies) a scorpion motif. In the comic, he is sometimes seen wearing glasses.
- Whiz Vid (sometimes Whiz Kid) is a psychotic young genius whose inventions constantly backfire or do the exact opposite of what they should, often leading him to yell "Glitch!" His catchphrase is an odd laugh that sounds like "Whoo-hoy!" His vehicle is the Cannon, a red and yellow mobile artillery with six wheels. In the comic, he is sometimes seen wearing a red and white exosuit.

=== Other characters ===
- Slyme is Fungus's sleazy lawyer, who is as greedy as his client and uses many legal malapropisms. His last name is "Whiplash" and he travels around in a large purple limousine. In the comic, he works for the law firm of Dewey, Cheatam and Howe and constantly secretes green slime.
- Bambi, Bimbi, and Bombi are the three identical bimbo girlfriends of Fungus.
- Nina Newscaster is a news reporter who is often present for the feuds of the Stunt Dawgs and the Stunt Scabs.
- Velda is a woman who has a crush on Crash (bordering on an insanely jealous obsession). She was left at the altar by Crash, although according to him, it was just part of a stunt and not a real marriage.

== Cast ==
- Neil Crone as Whiz Vid and Needham
- Harvey Atkin as Badyear and Half-A-Mind
- Ron Rubin as Slyme and Airball
- Barbara Budd as Nina Newscaster
- Greg Morton as Crash, Velda, and Splat
- John Stocker as Richard P. Fungus
- Greg Swanson as Skidd and Lucky
- Lenore Zann as Sizzle and Bambi

== Episodes ==
#	Title	Summary	Original airdate
1	Scenes of the Crime	Richard P. Fungus forms the Stunt Scabs for lights, camera, and mayhem, but the Stunt Dawgs attempt to foil Fungus's first crime spree.	September 28, 1992
2	Jailhouse Dawgs	The Scabs break Fungus out of jail so they can get back at the Stunt Dawgs.	October 5, 1992
3	Calling Dr. Fungus	Fungus's latest scheme leads the Dawgs to a hospital where he poses as a doctor, writing up phony insurance claims by causing car accidents.	October 12, 1992
4	The Big Payoff	TBA	October 19, 1992
5	The Incredible, Inedible Eggmen	While the Dawgs are dressed like egg-men and performing for the crowd at the Comic Book Show, Fungus and the Scabs steal an expensive first edition Egg-Men comic book and try to sell it to more than one buyer.	October 26, 1992
6	Morning in Halvakia	Fungus is directing a film in the Popular Republic of Halvakia until its Premier suffers a nearly fatal accident and now wants the Dawgs to take over the production of the film and be punished for him.	November 2, 1992
7	Endangering Species	A growth formula made by Whiz Vid leads to a hawk growing.	November 9, 1992
8	The House That Dreck Built	Fungus's deceased grandfather, Dreck von Fungusheim, was the best horror movie director of all time. Fungus now wants to finish his last film, a cursed movie said to be responsible for the deaths of all who saw it, including Dreck himself, but he loses control of the movie when the spirits of Dreck and his original stuntmen rise from the grave.	November 16, 1992
9	Rich Dawg, Poor Dawg	Trying to break the unity among the Dawgs, Fungus hires his lawyer, Slyme, to create a will turning Splat's money into Skidd's and keeping Skidd from giving it back without destroying the Stunt Dawgs.	November 23, 1992
10	Crash's Burden	TBA	November 30, 1992
11	Freedom of Screech	While trying to perform another stunt, the Dawgs cause an accident which gains the attention of the media, causing an interviewed woman to say that censors should ban all action movies. This inspires Fungus to create his own group of censors - the "STOP IT" - to ban all action movies except his.	December 7, 1992
12	Caribee Calamity	Fungus wishes to bring trash to the country of Caribee, so he tricks the leader into thinking that the Stunt Dawgs are rebels attempting to overthrow him and the Stunt Dawgs into thinking that this is a movie.	December 14, 1992
13	Go West, Young Dawgs	TBA	December 21, 1992
14	For Whom the Wedding Bell Tolls	TBA	December 28, 1992
15	Casting Call	TBA	January 4, 1993
16	The Word According to Fungus	Fungus founds a religious congregation to make people give him many cash donations, forcing Dawgs to stop him before Splat's parents give away all their money.	January 11, 1993
17	Dream on Fungus	Thanks to Slyme, Fungus finds a legal way to become the boss of the Stunt Dawgs and force them to work on his movies. To get rid of him, they trick Fungus into believing he is dead and going to Hell unless he gives away his rights over them.	January 18, 1993
18	Badyear's Billions	Badyear is revealed to be the disinherited nephew of a billionaire, prompting Fungus to try to re-approach the billionaire for money, only to learn that Splat is trying to convince Badyear's uncle to leave his money to charity.	January 25, 1993
19	Paris When It Sizzles	Fungus is trying to use Whiz Vid's latest invention to print the face of one of his girlfriends in the Mona Lisa. The results of the Dawgs vs. Scabs battle at the Louvre increase Airball's height, and he takes Sizzle and the Mona Lisa for a date.	February 1, 1993
20	Night of the Scabs	TBA	February 8, 1993
21	Bad Day at Badwater	The Stunt Dawgs go to a ranch to visit Sizzle's cousin, Daisy, but the Stunt Scabs want Daisy's whole will.	February 15, 1993
22	Chunky Needham	To take over the Dawgs' job in a movie about the desert, the Scabs try to trick Needham into believing he's gaining weight.	February 22, 1993
23	Nuclear Nap	Fungus plans to steal the Nuclear Napper, a sleep-inducing rocket, and use it against the Stunt Dawgs.	March 1, 1993
24	Stunt Dawgs to the Rescue	The Stunt Dawgs have to stop Fungus and the Stunt Scabs from taking over the Hollywood branch of the United Nations.	March 8, 1993
25	Deja Coup	TBA	March 15, 1993
26	Star Dawgs	The Stunt Scabs hijack a satellite so it will play only what Fungus tells it to. The Stunt Dawgs spring into action to get Fungus's show canceled.	March 22, 1993
27	Stunt Puppies	Fungus plans to use a rejuvenation machine on the Stunt Dawgs, transforming them into babies, thus planning to steal the money machine from the National Mint.	March 29, 1993
28	Cannon Blam Run	The Stunt Dawgs and the Stunt Scabs compete in a race for money, which the Dawgs intend to give to charity.	April 5, 1993
29	Freeze-Dried Dawg	The Stunt Scabs suck water from lakes and start extorting money from people for water.	April 12, 1993
30	Neehigh Needham	TBA	April 19, 1993
31	Human Catastrophe	Splat's dog Human is unruly, so Splat decides to send him to obedience school.	April 26, 1993
32	Stunt Girls	The Dawgs and the Scabs disguise themselves as groups of stunt girls for two different reasons: the Dawgs need the job and the Scabs are searching for the treasure of a deceased actress.	May 3, 1993
33	Fungustein	With pieces of clothing from the Dawgs, Whiz Vid creates a stunt robot named Scabulator, who steals the Dawgs' job. When Fungus fires them, considering them useless, the other Scabs join the Dawgs to destroy Scabulator so they all may get their jobs back.	May 10, 1993
34	Half-A-Mind over Matter	When he becomes smarter than Whiz Vid, Half-A-Mind develops a psychotic side, causing the other Scabs and the Dawgs to team up to return him to normal.	May 17, 1993
35	Dawgin' It	TBA	May 24, 1993
36	Stop That Darn Noise	Whiz Vid develops a sonic cannon that Fungus uses to take over the Dawgs' base of operations.	May 31, 1993
37	The Treasure of Crash's Madre	Crash's mother is out of town and leaves the Dawgs in charge of keeping her treasured recipe safe, but the Scabs steal it, forcing Dawgs to call Velda for help.	June 7, 1993
38	Dawg Paddle	An explorer finds herself in "slowsand" and the Dawgs and the Scabs are in a race to rescue her for money. The Dawgs need the money so that they can stay together, and Fungus intends not to let them have it.	June 14, 1993
39	Viva Lost Wages	Fungus leaves Hollywood and buys a casino in Las Vegas, causing Sizzle to visit his twin brother R. Peter Fungus at the sanatorium to have an idea of what can be expected from that. Sizzle accidentally leaves her flamethrower, which helps him to escape and go to Las Vegas after Fungus.	June 21, 1993
40	Lucky's 13th	Lucky, the usually unlucky member of the Stunt Scabs, turns out to be extremely lucky on Friday the 13th, and Fungus wants to take advantage of this to steal gold from Fort Knox.	June 28, 1993

== Home media ==
Stunt Dawgs was available on VHS.
