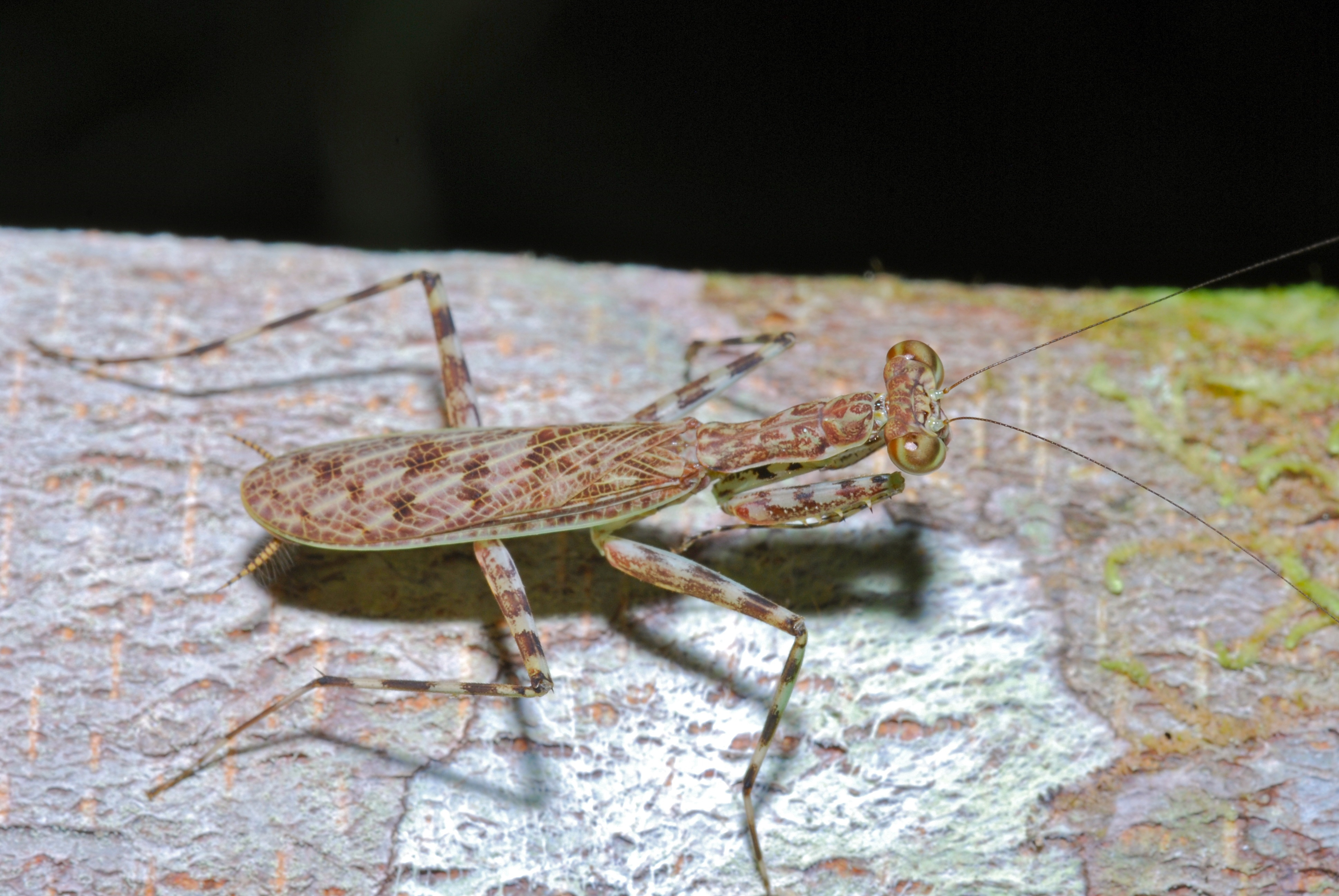
- Liturgusa maya

Scientific classification
- Kingdom: Animalia
- Phylum: Arthropoda
- Clade: Pancrustacea
- Class: Insecta
- Order: Mantodea
- Superfamily: Acanthopoidea
- Family: Liturgusidae; Giglio-Tos, 1919

= Liturgusidae =

Family of praying mantises

Liturgusidae is a family of praying mantises in the new (2019) Neotropical superfamily Acanthopoidea. A substantial number of genera, previously placed here, have recently been moved to the new or revived other families:

- Dactylopterygidae
- Gonypetidae
- Epaphroditidae: subfamily Gonatistinae
- Majangidae: subfamily Majanginae
- Mantidae: subfamily Mellierinae
- Nanomantidae: subfamily Fulciniinae

== Tribes and Genera ==
The Mantodea Species File now lists two tribes, containing the following genera:

tribe Hagiomantini

- Hagiomantis Serville, 1839

tribe Liturgusini

- Corticomantis Svenson, 2014 - monotypic (Corticomantis atricoxata (Beier, 1931))
- Fuga Svenson, 2014
- Liturgusa Saussure, 1869 (lichen mantises)
- Velox Svenson, 2014 - monotypic (Velox wielandi Svenson, 2014)
