= Kratt brothers =

American scientists and television presenters

Martin and Chris Kratt
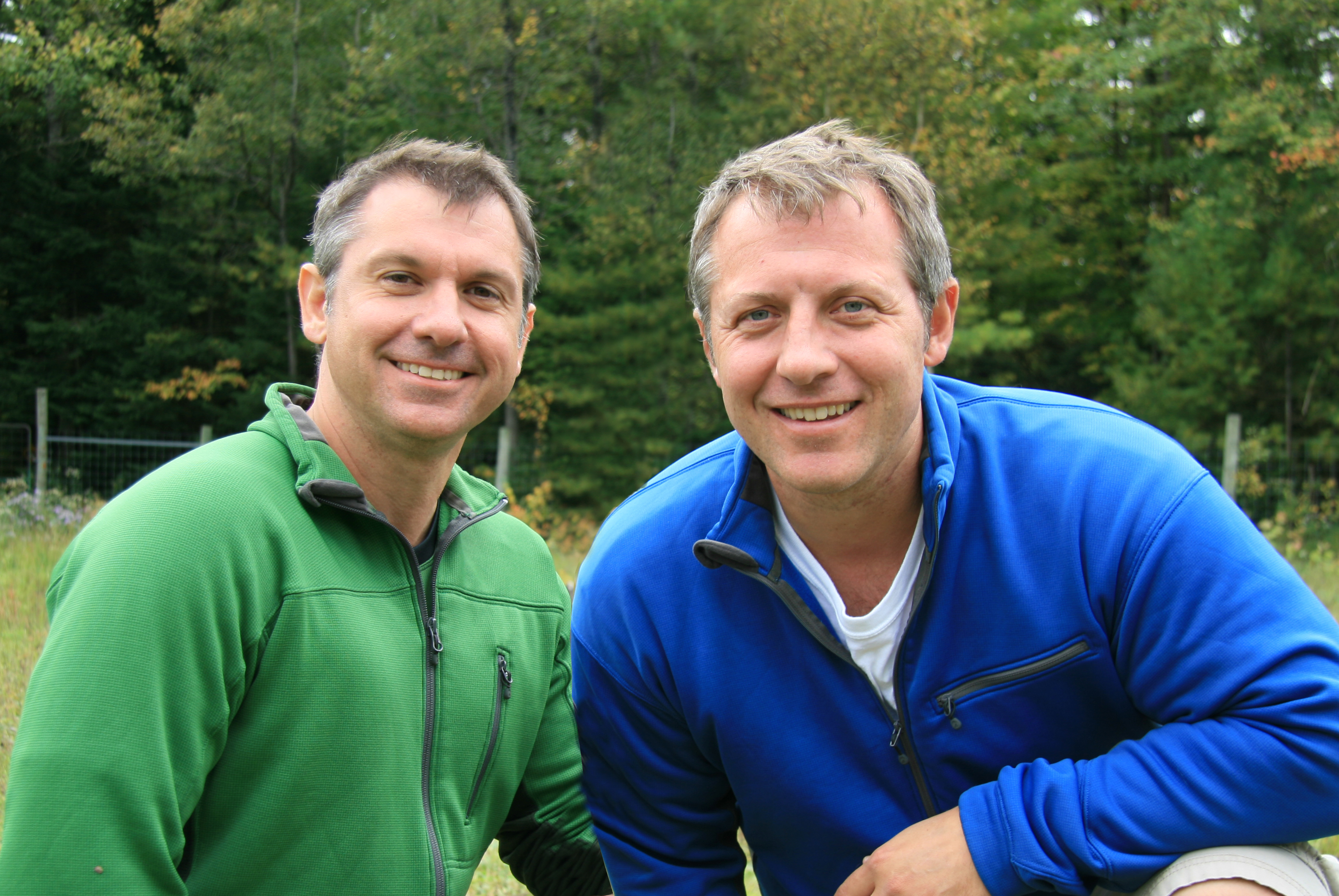
- Chris and Martin Kratt in 2010
- Born: Martin William Kratt; Christopher Frederick James Kratt; Martin: December 23, 1965 (age 60); Chris: July 19, 1969 (age 57); Warren Township, New Jersey, U.S.
- Occupations: Zoologist; biologist; children's television presenters; YouTubers
- Years active: 1990–present
- Television: Wild Kratts; Zoboomafoo; Kratts' Creatures; Be The Creature
- Spouses: Martin: Laura Wilkinson (m. 2000; died 2024); Chris: Tania Armstrong (m. 2000)
- Children: Martin: Gavin; Ronan; Chris: 2

YouTube information
- Channel: The Kratt Brothers (Wild Kratts)
- Years active: 2018–present
- Genre: Animals
- Subscribers: 93.6 thousand
- Views: 15.1 million
- Last updated: July 7, 2026
- Website: www.wildkratts.com

Martin (born December 23, 1965) and Chris Kratt (born July 19, 1969) are American zoologists, educational nature show hosts, and YouTubers. The brothers grew up in Warren Township, New Jersey, and together created the children's television series Kratts' Creatures, Zoboomafoo, Be the Creature (which aired on the National Geographic Channel and CBC), and Wild Kratts (which airs on PBS Kids and TVOKids).

== Early lives and education ==
Martin William Kratt was born on December 23, 1965, and Christopher Frederick James Kratt was born on July 19, 1969, to Linda (born 1939) and William King Kratt (1928–2022) in Warren Township, New Jersey, where the brothers grew up. They are the grandsons of musical instrument maker William Jacob Kratt (1892–1983), who emigrated from Germany to America in 1910.

The brothers attended Watchung Hills Regional High School. Both were inducted into the school's hall of fame in 2013. Martin holds a Bachelor of Science in zoology from Duke University, and Chris holds a Bachelor of Arts in biology from Carleton College.

== Careers ==
Shortly after graduating from Duke University, Martin became a research assistant for a howler monkey project under Dr. Kenneth Glander in Costa Rica. He later worked with Dr. Patricia Wright in Madagascar and Dr. John Terbogh in the Peruvian Amazon rainforest. In 1990, Chris served as an intern at Conservation International in Washington, D.C. A year later, he started the Carleton Organization for Biodiversity. His ecology studies have been funded by the Explorers Club and the National Science Foundation. He was also the recipient of the Thomas J. Watson Fellowship.

Chris starred alongside his brother Martin in the show Zoboomafoo, which aired from 1999 to 2001. On this PBS Kids show, they went on many adventures with animals with the help of Zoboomafoo, a Coquerel's sifaka lemur (Propithecus coquereli). The other shows the brothers have created are Wild Kratts, Be the Creature, Kratt's Creatures, and Wild Alaska Live.

From June 13 to August 3, 2008, the brothers appeared in Creature Adventures, a stage show at Dollywood in Pigeon Forge, Tennessee. They also appear as themselves in the Odd Squad episode "Night Shift". Additionally, in the Nature Cat crossover episode “Wild Batts!”, the Kratt Brothers appear as the Batt Brothers, bat versions of themselves looking for a new home. They also appear in the Molly of Denali crossover episode “Cry Wolf” as themselves looking for a missing pack of wolves with the help of the series protagonist Molly Mabray and her father.

In 2017, Gavin Svenson discovered a new species of mantis and named it Liturgusa krattorum after the brothers for their impact on the educational television genre. A special episode of Wild Kratts was later released to commemorate the occasion.

== Personal lives ==
The brothers have lived in Ottawa, Ontario, since 2008, where they film and produce their series Wild Kratts.

=== Martin Kratt ===
Martin was married to Laura Wilkinson from 2000 until her death in 2024 and has two sons, Ronan and Gavin, both of whom have had roles on Wild Kratts.

=== Chris Kratt ===
Chris has two sons, Aidan and Nolan, with his wife Tania Armstrong, an interior designer whom he married in 2000 in Botswana. Like their cousins Gavin and Ronan, Aidan and Nolan have roles in Wild Kratts as animated versions of themselves.
