= Chris Kratt =

American biologist and television presenter (born 1969)

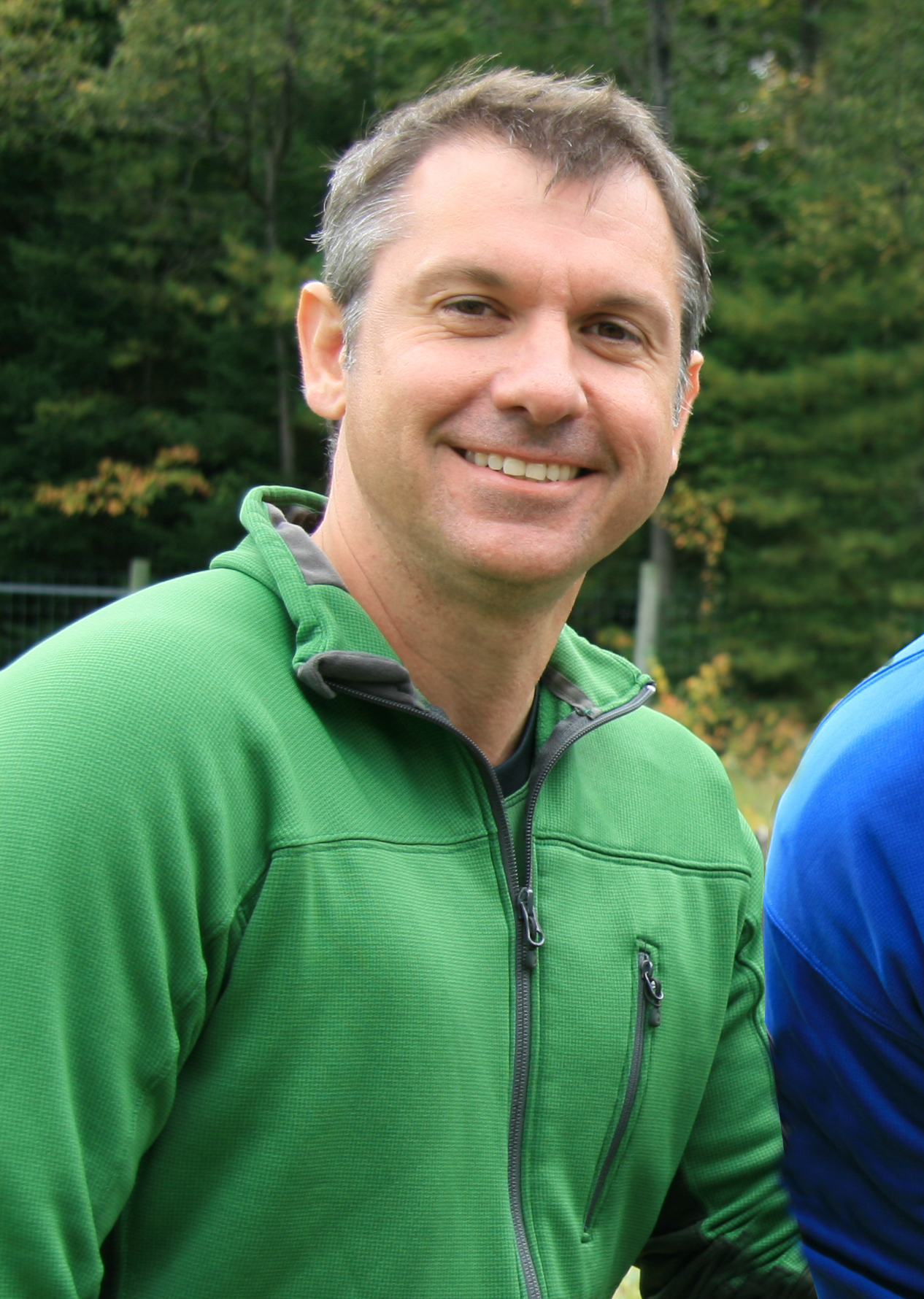
- Kratt in 2010
- Born: Christopher Frederick James Kratt; July 19, 1969 (age 57); Warren Township, New Jersey, U.S.
- Education: Carleton College (BA)
- Occupations: Biologist; children's television presenter; YouTuber
- Years active: 1990–present
- Television: Wild Kratts; Be the Creature; Zoboomafoo; Kratts' Creatures
- Spouse: Tania Armstrong (m. 2000)
- Children: 2
- Relatives: Martin Kratt (brother); Ronan Kratt (nephew); Gavin Kratt (nephew)

YouTube information
- Channel: The Kratt Brothers (Wild Kratts)
- Years active: 2018–present
- Genre: Animals
- Subscribers: 93.6 thousand
- Views: 15.1 million
- Last updated: July 7, 2026
- Website: www.wildkratts.com

Christopher Frederick James Kratt (born July 19, 1969) is an American biologist, educational nature show host, and YouTuber. One of the Kratt brothers, he and his older brother, Martin, created the children's television series Kratts' Creatures, Zoboomafoo, and Be the Creature (which aired on the National Geographic Channel and CBC), as well as Wild Kratts (which airs on PBS Kids and TVOKids).

== Early life and education ==
Christopher Frederick James Kratt was born on July 19, 1969, to Linda (born 1939) and William King Kratt (1928–2022) in Warren Township, New Jersey, where he and his older brother, Martin, grew up. They are the grandsons of musical instrument manufacturer William Jacob Kratt (1892–1983), who emigrated from Germany to America in 1910.

Chris and his brother attended Watchung Hills Regional High School; they were inducted into the school's hall of fame in 2013. He holds a Bachelor of Arts in biology from Carleton College.

== Career ==
In 1990, Chris served as an intern at Conservation International in Washington, D.C. A year later, he started the Carleton Organization for Biodiversity. His ecology studies have been funded by the Explorers Club and the National Science Foundation. He was also the recipient of the Thomas J. Watson Fellowship.

Chris also starred alongside his brother, Martin, in the show Zoboomafoo, which aired from 1999 to 2001. On this PBS kids show, they went on many adventures with animals with the help of Zoboomafoo, a Coquerel's sifaka lemur (Propithecus coquereli). Other shows he created with his brother include Wild Kratts, Be the Creature, Kratt's Creatures, and Wild Alaska Live.

From June 13 to August 3, 2008, Chris appeared alongside his brother in Creature Adventures, a stage show at Dollywood in Pigeon Forge, Tennessee. They also appear as themselves in the Odd Squad episode "Night Shift."

== Personal life ==
In 2000, Chris and his wife, Tania Armstrong, an interior designer, were married in Botswana. They have two sons, Aidan and Nolan. They split their time between their home in Ottawa, and Stowe, Vermont. Chris and his brother, Martin, have lived in Ottawa since 2008, where they film and produce their television series Wild Kratts.

Chris is an avid skier, having skied since he was a child, often going to Jay Peak Resort and Burke Mountain Ski Area. He credits his love of nature to his visits to Vermont, where his parents owned property in the Northeast Kingdom. They would often camp there during the summer.
