= Dead Hendrix =

American-Canadian rapper (born 2001)

- Born: Gavin Kratt; June 1, 2001 (age 25); Burlington, Vermont, U.S.
- Occupations: Rapper; singer; voice actor
- Years active: 2011–present
- Relatives: Martin Kratt (father); Chris Kratt (uncle); Ronan Kratt (brother)
- Website: www.deadhendrix.com

Gavin Kratt (born June 1, 2001), also known as Dead Hendrix, is an American-Canadian rapper and singer based in Ottawa. Originally a recurring cast member on the PBS Kids animated series Wild Kratts, he began releasing music in 2020, with releases of note being the 2023 single "Mustang" in collaboration with Yungcudii and the 2022 EP Dead Summer in collaboration with Levi Zadoff. In 2023 Dead Hendrix was featured on Allcapyow's 2023 album release "Ottawa x Toronto" alongside Toronto rapper 3MFrench.

== Filmography ==
Television

- Wild Kratts (2011-2016): Gavin (14 eps.)

== Discography ==
Singles

- "Hold Up" (2020)
- "Medusa" (2020)
- "Miss U" (2020)
- "D.$.O.$" (2021)
- "Alone" (2022)
- "Toxic" (2022)
- "Mustang" (2023)
- "DTH" (2023)

EP's

- Dead Summer (2022)
