= Martin Kratt =

American zoologist and television presenter (born 1965)

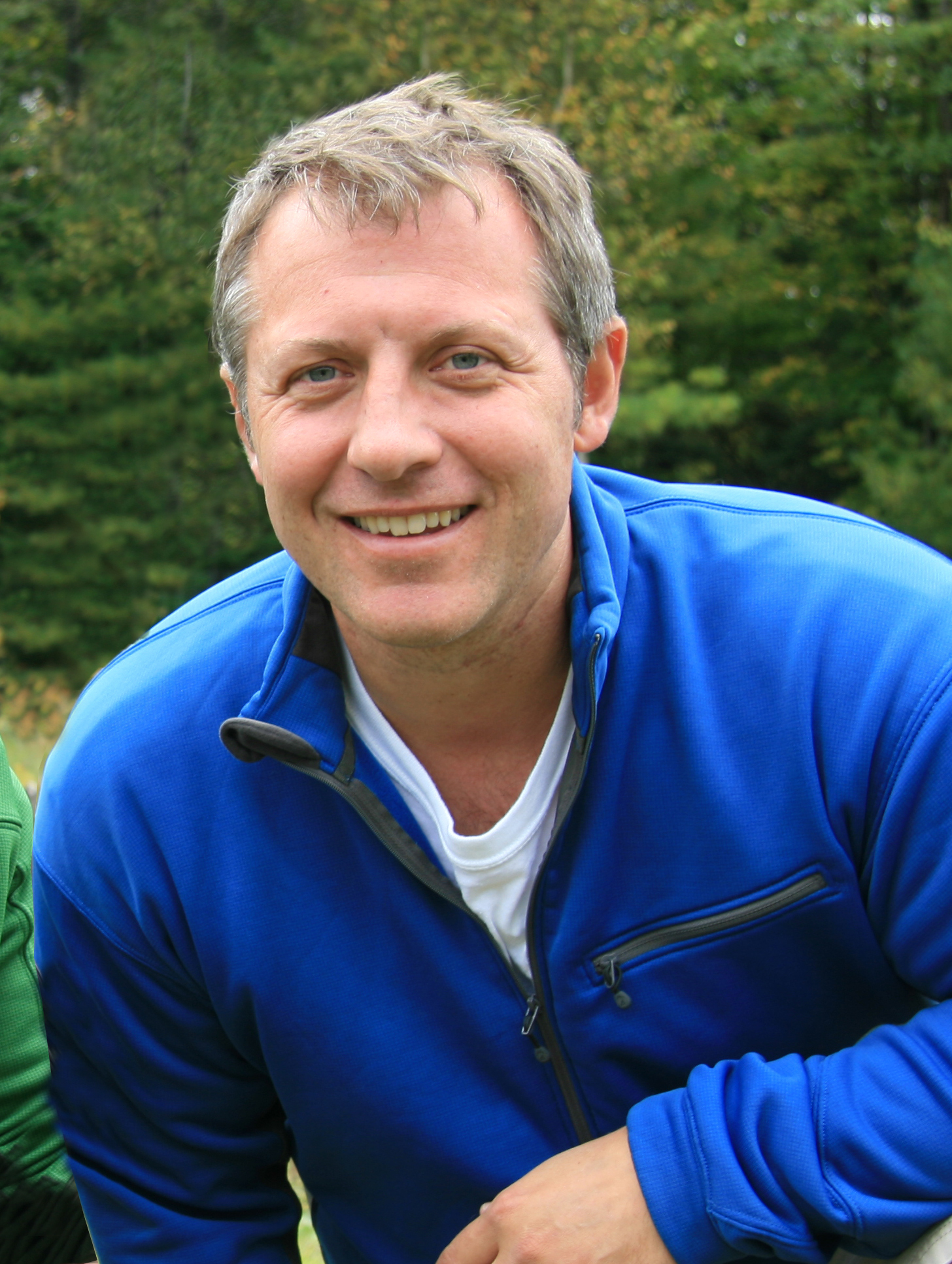
- Kratt in 2010
- Born: Martin William Kratt; December 23, 1965 (age 60); Warren Township, New Jersey, U.S.
- Education: Duke University (BSc)
- Occupations: Zoologist; children's television presenter; YouTuber
- Years active: 1990–present
- Television: Wild Kratts; Be the Creature; Zoboomafoo; Kratts' Creatures
- Spouse: Laura Wilkinson (m. 2000; died 2024)
- Children: Gavin; Ronan
- Relatives: Chris Kratt (brother)

YouTube information
- Channel: The Kratt Brothers (Wild Kratts)
- Years active: 2018–present
- Genre: Animals
- Subscribers: 93.6 thousand
- Views: 15.1 million
- Last updated: July 7, 2026
- Website: www.wildkratts.com

Martin William Kratt (born December 23, 1965) is an American zoologist, educational nature show host, and YouTuber. One of the Kratt brothers, he and his younger brother, Chris, created the children's television series Kratts' Creatures and Zoboomafoo, as well as Be the Creature, which runs on the National Geographic Channel and Knowledge Network. They are the main characters on the animated television series Wild Kratts, which airs on PBS Kids.

== Early life and education ==
Martin William Kratt was born on December 23, 1965, to Linda (born 1939) and William King Kratt (1928–2022) in Warren Township, New Jersey, where he and his younger brother, Chris, grew up. They are the grandsons of musical instrument manufacturer William Jacob Kratt (1892–1983), who emigrated from Germany to America in 1910.

Martin would often vacation in Vermont, where his family owned a property in the Northeast Kingdom. He and his brother attended Watchung Hills Regional High School; they were inducted into the school's hall of fame in 2013. Martin holds a Bachelor of Science in zoology from Duke University.

== Career ==
Shortly after graduating from Duke University, Martin became a research assistant for a howler monkey project under Dr. Kenneth Glander in Costa Rica. He later worked with Dr. Patricia Wright in Madagascar and Dr. John Terbogh in the Peruvian Amazon rainforest. Together, Martin and Chris created the children's television series Kratts' Creatures and Zoboomafoo, as well as Be the Creature, which runs on the National Geographic Channel and Knowledge Network. They are the main characters on the animated television series Wild Kratts, which airs on PBS Kids. They created the show Wild Alaska Live, and also appear as themselves in the Odd Squad episode "Night Shift."

== Personal life ==
Martin married Laura Wilkinson in 2000, and they remained married until her death in 2024. He had two sons with her, Gavin (born 2001), a punk rapper, and Ronan (born 2003), a soccer player, both of whom have had roles on Wild Kratts.

Martin and his brother, Chris, have lived in Ottawa, since 2008, where they film and produce Wild Kratts.
