= Be the Creature =

TV series created by the Kratt Brothers

- Genre: Documentary
- Created by: Chris Kratt; Martin Kratt
- Directed by: Chris Kratt; Martin Kratt
- Presented by: Chris Kratt; Martin Kratt
- Countries of origin: United States; Canada
- Original languages: English; French
- No. of seasons: 2
- No. of episodes: 30

Production
- Executive producers: Chris Kratt; Martin Kratt
- Producers: Chris Kratt; Martin Kratt
- Running time: 42 minutes
- Production companies: Decode Entertainment (Note: As Decode/BTC1 Productions Inc. or Decode/BTC2 Productions Inc.); Kratt Brothers Company Limited

Original release
- Network: National Geographic Channel; CBC
- Release: October 5, 2003 – April 9, 2007

Be the Creature is a TV series created by the Kratt Brothers (Chris and Martin), in which they immerse themselves in the lives of different animals around the world, living alongside them to experience their natural behaviors and habitats firsthand. The show combines adventure and education, offering insights into the lives of wildlife through the brothers' close encounters.

After years of filming Zoboomafoo and Kratts' Creatures in a studio, Chris and Martin Kratt desired to return to fieldwork, living closely with animals for extended periods. This led to the creation of Be the Creature for National Geographic, where they spent weeks living among grizzlies, lions, and other wildlife. Each episode, lasting 40 minutes, was distilled from approximately 75 hours of raw footage collected during each expedition. Be the Creature is oriented towards teens and adults, unlike the brothers' previous shows. It features some graphic footage in an effort to portray life in the wild truthfully.

== Episodes ==
=== Season 1 (2003–04) ===
1. Brown Bear
2. Wild Dogs
3. Lion
4. Lemurs
5. Manatees
6. Japanese Macaque
7. Coastal Creatures
8. Chimps
9. Mongoose
10. Sharks
11. Bats
12. Kangaroo
13. Baboon

=== Season 2 (2004–07) ===
Note: "Giant Panda" was produced and aired as part of a "Season 3", but is listed here because said season only consisted of the aforementioned episode.

1. Cheetah
2. Orangutan
3. Komodo Dragon
4. Meerkat
5. Kill Zone
6. The Pantanal
7. Galapagos
8. Spotted Hyena
9. Battling Bighorn
10. Staying Alive's
11. Weapons For Survival
12. Leopard
13. Ethiopian Wolf
14. Leopard
15. Expedition Leopard
16. Expedition Japanese Macaque
17. Giant Panda
