= Kratts' Creatures =

- Genre: Children's television series
- Created by: Martin Kratt; Chris Kratt; Leo Eaton
- Presented by: Chris and Martin Kratt; Shannon Duff
- Voices of: Ron Rubin
- Theme music composer: Pure West
- Composer: Pure West
- Countries of origin: Canada; United States
- Original language: English
- No. of seasons: 1
- No. of episodes: 50

Production
- Executive producers: Jon Slan; Leo Eaton; Richard Borchiver
- Producer: Wilson Coneybeare
- Production locations: Toronto, Ontario, Canada
- Running time: 28 minutes
- Production companies: Paragon Entertainment Corporation; Earth Creatures; Maryland Public Television; TMG Groups

Original release
- Network: PBS
- Release: June 3 – August 9, 1996

Related
- Zoboomafoo (1999–2001); Be the Creature (2003–2007); Wild Kratts (2011–present)

Kratts' Creatures is a half-hour children's television series that originally ran on PBS during the summer of 1996. The first in a series of programs produced by the Kratt brothers, Chris and Martin, Kratts' Creatures was made to be the first wildlife show aimed specifically towards young children. It featured the Kratt brothers as they traveled worldwide, exploring different animals and their habitats. They received assistance from their friends Allison Baldwin (Shannon Duff) and Ttark, an animated creature (voiced by Ron Rubin). The show ran for one season on PTV from June 3, 1996, to August 9, 1996, with 50 episodes, with reruns continuing to air until June 9, 2000. Select PBS member stations kept the show until August 31, 2001. Due to its popularity, the show inspired an unofficial spin-off, Zoboomafoo, created by the Kratt brothers, which premiered on January 25, 1999.

== Cast ==
- Chris Kratt (portrayed by himself): The younger brother. Chris wears green in North America and Africa, while he wears red in Central America and Australia.
- Martin Kratt (portrayed by himself): The older brother. Martin usually wears blue in North America, Africa, and Australia, while in Central America, he usually wears white.
- Allison Baldwin (portrayed by Shannon Duff): Allison is a personal agent of the Kratt Brothers. She is most commonly seen at their base of Creature Central but occasionally joins the brothers in the field. She is very adept with the gadgets at Creature Central and frequently expands on topics with research from the Creature-Web or books.
- Ttark (voiced by Ron Rubin) is a blue creature who resembles an aardvark. He is knowledgeable about ancient and extinct animals, but is often behind the times about modern creatures. Ttark's name is "Kratt" spelt in reverse.

== Episodes ==
No.	Title	Other notes	Original release date	PBS Kids Go! release date
1	"Big Five, Little Five"	VHS release	June 3, 1996	October 27, 2006
The brothers visit South Africa, in search of the Big Five and the Little Five animals of the savanna.
2	"City Critters"	VHS release	June 4, 1996	November 3, 2006
The brothers search the city for animals who call urban areas their home.
3	"Sharks"	VHS release	June 5, 1996	November 10, 2006
The brothers take to the Bahamian waters in search of sharks and other sea creatures that interact with them.
4	"Running with the Wild Dogs"	VHS release	June 6, 1996	November 17, 2006
The brothers track the African savanna in search of the elusive and disappearing African wild dog.
5	"In Search of the Tasmanian Tiger"	VHS release	June 7, 1996	November 24, 2006
The brothers retrace the steps of fictional explorers in search of a Tasmanian tiger. As they travel, they encounter many of the island's creatures.
6	"The Great Defenders"	VHS release	June 10, 1996	December 1, 2006
Chris and Martin team up with Allison to examine the way different creatures defend themselves against their predators.
7	"Pan Troglodytes: An In-depth Analysis"	VHS release	June 11, 1996	December 8, 2006
The brothers go to Africa to investigate chimpanzees.
8	"The Great Canadians"	VHS release	June 12, 1996	December 15, 2006
The brothers travel north to visit the nation of Canada. There, they see creatures including beavers, otters, loons, elk and moose.
9	"Rain Forests: Under the Canopy"	VHS release	June 13, 1996	December 22, 2006
The brothers visit the rainforests of Costa Rica, where they encounter a few of the many creatures who live there including tapirs, jaguars, toucans, hummingbirds and three-toed sloths.
10	"Creatures of the Night"	VHS release	June 14, 1996	December 29, 2006
The brothers examine nocturnal creatures in Australia, including brush-tailed possums, Tasmanian devils, flying foxes, kangaroos, and different kinds of bats.
11	"Elephants 1: Educating Emily"	VHS release	June 17, 1996	January 5, 2007
The brothers visit the Sheldrick Wildlife Trust in Kenya, where they become caretakers of orphaned baby elephants for a day.
12	"Elephants 2: Wild Elephants Can't Drag Me Away"	VHS release	June 18, 1996	January 12, 2007
The brothers search for wild elephants in Africa, in preparation for releasing the orphaned elephants they helped care for.
13	"Weird Creatures"	VHS release	June 19, 1996	January 19, 2007
The brothers search for creatures that "break the rules," including egg-laying mammals, flightless birds and sea creatures that look like vegetables.
14	"Planet of the Dolphins"	VHS release	June 20, 1996	January 26, 2007
The brothers head to the waters in search of dolphins.
15	"The Great Bear Show"	VHS release	June 21, 1996	February 2, 2007
The brothers stick to North America to examine different kinds of bears.
16	"Mgobo of Baboon Mountain"	VHS release	June 24, 1996	February 9, 2007
The brothers split up, so they can get twice as many observations about the baboons they're studying in Kenya.
17	"The How Show"	VHS release	June 25, 1996	February 16, 2007
The brothers answer some puzzling questions about animals, including "How do reptiles survive in the desert," "How do snakes eat things bigger than their heads," "How do some creatures see in the dark" and "How do animals know what to eat?"
18	"Kickboxing Kangaroos"	VHS release	June 26, 1996	February 23, 2007
The brothers examine kangaroos, as well as other animals native to Australia.
19	"The Giant Bug Invasion"	VHS release	June 27, 1996	March 2, 2007
Allison, Martin, and Chris examine insects, including caterpillars, butterflies, ants, and scorpions.
20	"Heavyweights of Africa"	VHS release	June 28, 1996	March 9, 2007
The brothers look at some of the biggest animals in the African savanna -- the hippopotamus and rhinoceros.
21	"The Redcoats Are Coming"	VHS release	July 1, 1996	March 16, 2007
The brothers examine one of the greatest hunters in North America -- the red fox.
22	"The Cow Show"	VHS release	July 2, 1996	March 23, 2007
The brothers travel to the Everglades to study the creatures that live there, including the manatees, or "sea cow."
23	"Maximum Cheetah Velocity"	VHS release	July 3, 1996	March 30, 2007
The brothers look at the fastest land animal in the world -- the cheetah.
24	"Wild Ponies"	VHS release	July 4, 1996	April 6, 2007
The brothers look at horses and go in search of wild ponies.
25	"Who's Who?"	VHS release	July 5, 1996	April 13, 2007
The brothers each choose an animal and track its history of evolution to show how all animals are related.
26	"Arribada 1: Sea Turtle Invasion"	VHS release	July 8, 1996	April 20, 2007
The brothers head to Costa Rica for "Arribada" (The Arrival), where sea turtles from all over the world come to one beach to lay their eggs.
27	"Arribada 2: Running the Gauntlet"	VHS release	July 9, 1996	April 27, 2007
The brothers continue their examination of the "Arribada" (The Arrival), where sea turtles from all over the world have come to one beach to lay their eggs. After the eggs are laid, numerous predators abound.
28	"Around Australia in Eight Days"	VHS release	July 10, 1996	May 4, 2007
The brothers explore Australia, examining creatures including kangaroos, penguins, camels and crocodiles.
29	"Hyenas Are Cool"	VHS release	July 11, 1996	May 11, 2007
The brothers cover the African savanna in search of the hyena.
30	"Mungu's Revenge"	VHS release	July 12, 1996	May 18, 2007
The brothers and Allison share legends surrounding different creatures.
31	"Creature Rescue"	VHS release	July 15, 1996	May 25, 2007
The brothers rescue animals that are in trouble in numerous locations and predicaments.
32	"Lion, King of the Beasts?"	VHS release	July 16, 1996	June 1, 2007
The brothers examine the "king of the beasts," the lion.
33	"Marshmania"	VHS release	July 17, 1996	June 8, 2007
The brothers travel to the marshy wetlands of Virginia to see what creatures live there.
34	"Why?"	VHS release	July 18, 1996	June 15, 2007
The brothers attempt to answer puzzling questions about creatures, including "Why do animals play," "Why do animals live in groups" and "Why are there no bears in Africa?"
35	"Koalas and Wombats: The Untold Story"	VHS release	July 19, 1996	June 22, 2007
The brothers explore Australia, discussing two of its native creatures, the koala and the wombat.
36	"Backyard Bandits"	VHS release	July 22, 1996	June 29, 2007
The brothers and Allison go in search of the "backyard bandit," the raccoon. While out, they look at some other nocturnal creatures, including cats and bats.
37	"Hanging with the Monkeys"	VHS release	July 23, 1996	July 6, 2007
The brothers head to a Central American rainforest to check out the similarities and differences between man and monkeys.
38	"The Best of the Best"	VHS release	July 24, 1996	July 13, 2007
The brothers check out animals with the greatest attributes, including those with the best teeth, the best runners, and the best jumpers.
39	"Polyp Power"	VHS release	July 25, 1996	July 20, 2007
The brothers visit and explore Australia's Great Barrier Reef.
40	"Wings!"	VHS release	July 26, 1996	July 27, 2007
The brothers examine different kinds of birds and flying creatures, including eagles, hawks, bats, and vultures.
41	"Phantom Wolves"	VHS release	July 29, 1996	August 3, 2007
The brothers go in search of the wolf, and along the way, examine other animals, including wolverines, squirrels, bears and elk.
42	"Australia: Land of Mystery and Intrigue"	VHS release	July 30, 1996	August 10, 2007
The brothers check out the continent of Australia and explain how the different animals who reside there originally arrived in that country.
43	"Leopard: Prince of Death"	VHS release	July 31, 1996	August 17, 2007
The brothers take to the African savanna to examine the mighty leopard, and the animals that interact with her.
44	"When?"	VHS release	August 1, 1996	August 24, 2007
The brothers look at time: when creatures do what they do, and how important timing is to their activities.
45	"Parched and Thirsty in the Outback"	VHS release	August 2, 1996	August 31, 2007
The brothers examine creatures who live in the hot and dry Outback in Australia and search out how these creatures survive with so little water.
46	"Gatorglades"	VHS release	August 5, 1996	September 7, 2007
The brothers head to the Everglades to examine crocodiles and alligators.
47	"Spots and Stripes Forever"	VHS release	August 6, 1996	September 14, 2007
The brothers examine animals who have built-in camouflage such as stripes and spots. These creatures include zebras, giraffes and leopards.
48	"Three Cool Cats"	VHS release	August 7, 1996	September 21, 2007
The brothers check out three cool cats: the bobcat, the lynx and the cougar.
49	"Where?"	VHS release	August 8, 1996	September 28, 2007
The brothers explore creature distribution, explaining why different creatures live where they do.
50	"Around Africa in Eight Hours"	VHS release	August 9, 1996	October 5, 2007
The brothers retrace their visit to Africa, re-exploring creatures they've seen before, and spotting some new ones as well.

== VHS releases ==
- "In Search of the Tasmanian Tiger" / "Mungu's Revenge"
- Ultimate Animals / "Big Five, Little Five"
- "The Great Defenders" / "Spots and Stripes Forever"
- "Kickboxing Kangaroos" / Koalas or Wombats: The Untold Story"
- "Wild Ponies" / "Phantom Wolves"
- "Leopard: Prince of Death" / "Creatures of the Night"
- "When?" / "The How Show"
- "Hyenas are Cool"/ "Three Cool Cats"
- "Hanging with the Monkeys" / "Lion, King of Beasts"
- "Heavyweights of Africa" / "Wings"
- "Heavyweights of Africa" / "Around Africa in Eight Hours"
- "GatorGlades" / "Sharks"
- "Rainforests: Under the Canopy" / "Parched and Thirsty in the Outback"
- Behind the Scenes
