= Zoboomafoo =

1999 television series

- Genre: Educational; Children's; Comedy
- Created by: Martin Kratt Chris Kratt; Leo Eaton
- Presented by: Chris Kratt; Martin Kratt; Gord Robertson; Jovian
- Starring: Samantha Tolkacz (Season 1); Genevieve Farrell (Season 2)
- Theme music composer: Sterling Jarvis; Pure West
- Opening theme: "Me and You and Zoboomafoo"
- Ending theme: "Animal Friends Song"; "Me and You and Zoboomafoo" (instrumental)
- Composer: Pure West
- Countries of origin: United States; Canada
- Original language: English
- No. of seasons: 2
- No. of episodes: 65

Production
- Executive producers: Leo Eaton; Micheline Charest (1999–2000, uncredited); Peter Moss (2000–01); Chris Kratt; Martin Kratt
- Running time: 28 minutes
- Production companies: Earth Creatures; Maryland Public Television; CINAR Corporation

Original release
- Network: PBS Kids (US); CBC Kids (Canada)
- Release: January 25, 1999 – November 21, 2001

Zoboomafoo is a live-action/animated children's television series that originally aired on PBS from January 25, 1999, to November 21, 2001. After the original run on public television, reruns were shown on PBS Kids Sprout until 2012. A total of 65 episodes were aired. A creation of the Kratt Brothers (Chris and Martin Kratt), it features an anthropomorphic Coquerel's sifaka lemur named Zoboomafoo, performed by Canadian puppeteer Gord Robertson, and mainly portrayed by a lemur named Jovian, along with a collection of returned animal guests.

== Production ==
Zoboomafoo was produced by PBS Kids, CINAR Corporation (now folded into WildBrain), and the Kratt brothers' Earth Creatures company. Paragon Entertainment Corporation, who previously worked on Kratts' Creatures, was slated to be involved with Zoboomafoo before being replaced by CINAR.

Partial filming for the series took place on location at the Duke Lemur Center in Durham, North Carolina. The claymation segments were filmed at a studio in Etobicoke, Ontario, Canada. Although the last new episode aired on PBS Kids in November 2001, many PBS stations continued to rerun Zoboomafoo episodes in syndication through 2009. Select stations aired reruns as late as 2017. In addition, Sprout aired reruns until February 2012. The show was broadcast in the United States, Canada, Latin America, Brazil, Australia, New Zealand, Europe, Middle East, and India.

After the series ended, in 2003, the Kratt Brothers began another series titled Be the Creature on the National Geographic Channel. In 2011, they created the animated series Wild Kratts, which currently airs on PBS Kids and TVOntario.

Jovian (a captive Coquerel's sifaka housed at the Duke Lemur Center) portrayed Zoboomafoo in the live-action segments (with his parents Nigel and Flavia sometimes serving as stand-ins). On November 10, 2014, he died of kidney failure at his home at the age of 20.

== Cast ==
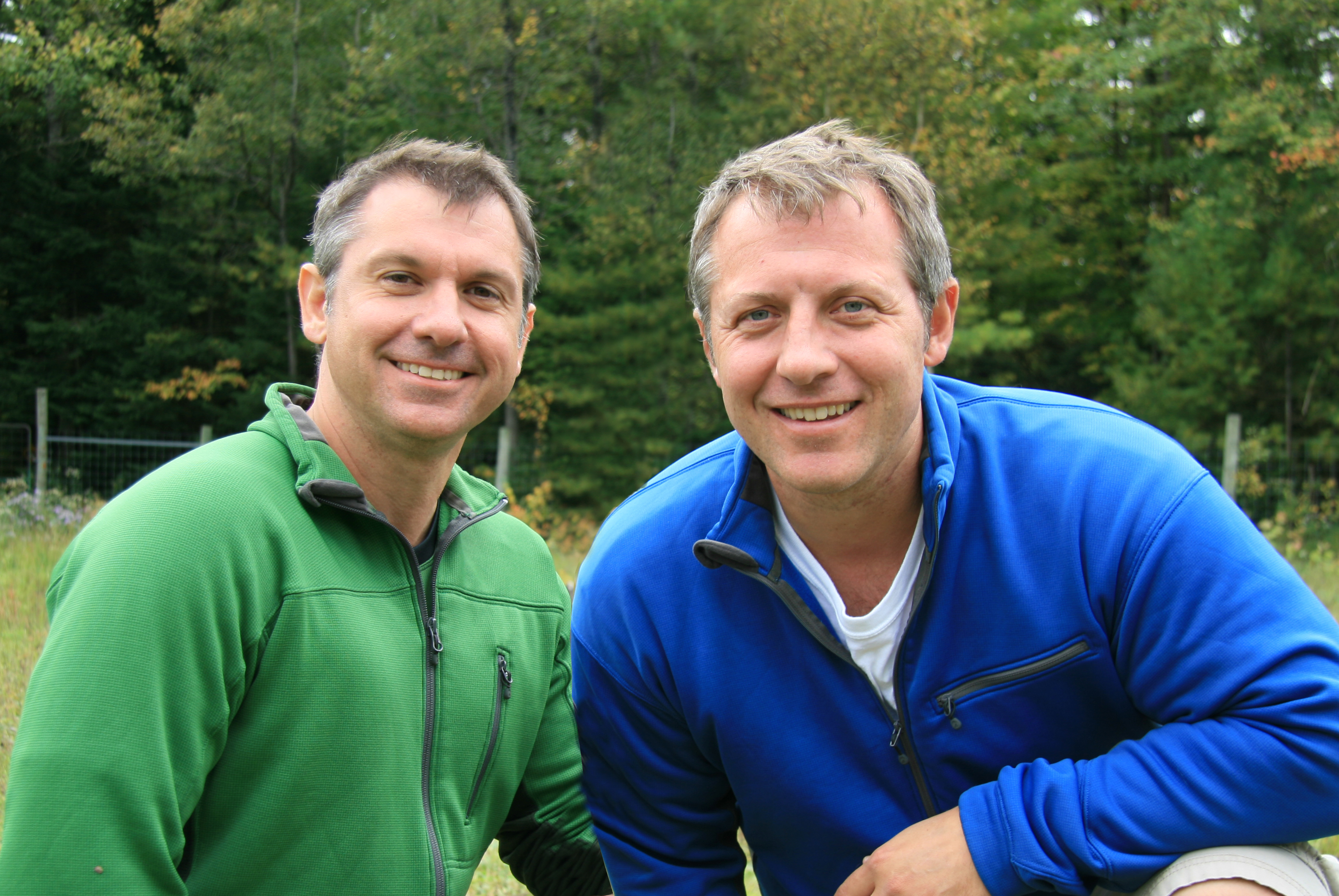
Chris (left) and Martin Kratt

- Chris Kratt as himself
- Martin Kratt as himself
- Jovian and Gord Robertson as Zoboomafoo
- Samantha Tolkacz as Jackie (Season 1)
- Genevieve Farrell as Amy (Season 2)

== Segments ==
- Zoboomafoo Theme Song
- The Kratt Brothers Arrive, Calling for Zoboo, and Snacktime
- The Mystery Animal (Song: "Who Could It Be?")
- Zobooland Story #1
- Mystery Animal Leaves (Song: "I Feel Different")
- Duck/Animal Helpers with Jackie/Amy
- A Journey to Visit Animals (Song: "Going to the Closet")
- Exploring the Wild and Seeing Animals
- Back to Animal Junction and Another Mystery Animal
- Zobooland Story #2
- Ending Theme: Animal Friends
- Zoboo and Kratt Brothers Leave Animal Junction
- Kids Introducing Their Pets
- Meeting Animals Disclaimer (PBS and Treehouse TV airings only, shown after the credits in the latter)
- Jokes From Zoboomafoo (PBS airings only)
- End Credits

== Episodes ==
=== Series overview ===
Season	Episodes	Originally released	
Season	Episodes	First released	Last released
1	40	January 25, 1999	April 27, 2000
2	25	October 3, 2000	November 21, 2001

=== Season 1 (1999–2000) ===
No. overall	No. in season	Title	Directed by (Note: Information is taken from the opening and ending credits of each episode.)	Written by	Original release date	Prod. code
1	1	"The Nose Knows"	Daniel J. Murphy	Simon Muntner	January 25, 1999	101
2	2	"Eye Spy"	Leo Eaton	Julie Strassman-Cohn	January 26, 1999	102
3	3	"Dinosaurs"	Jesse Collins	Carol Commisso	January 27, 1999	103
4	4	"Who's In the Hole"	Laurie Lynd	Chris Kratt	January 28, 1999	104
5	5	"Happy Lemur Day"	Steve Wright	Martin Kratt	January 29, 1999	105
6	6	"Swimming"	Tony Lefresne	Terry Saltsman	February 1, 1999	106
7	7	"Slimy Buddies"	Jesse Collins	Terry Saltsman	February 2, 1999	107
8	8	"Snow Day"	Jesse Collins	Martin Kratt	February 3, 1999	108
9	9	"Night Time"	Jesse Collins	Carol Commisso	February 4, 1999	109
10	10	"Climbing"	Tony Lefresne	Terry Saltsman	February 5, 1999	110
11	11	"Fierce Creatures"	Leo Eaton	Anna Bourque	February 8, 1999	111
12	12	"Homes"	Laurie Lynd	Julie Strassman-Cohn	February 9, 1999	112
13	13	"Puppies"	Laurie Lynd	Martin Kratt	February 10, 1999	113
14	14	"Tracks"	Leo Eaton	Carol Commisso	February 11, 1999	114
15	15	"Fling"	Steve Wright	Martin Kratt	February 12, 1999	115
16	16	"Itchy"	Leo Eaton	Brendan Smith	February 15, 1999	116
17	17	"Ears Hear"	Daniel J. Murphy	Martin Kratt	February 16, 1999	117
18	18	"Feeling Good"	Leo Eaton	Denise Fordham	February 17, 1999	118
19	19	"Running"	Daniel J. Murphy	James Hurst	February 18, 1999	119
20	20	"Animal Daycare"	Steve Wright	Anna Bourque	February 19, 1999	120
21	21	"Giants"	Steve Wright	Chris Waters	February 22, 1999	121
22	22	"Pets"	Steve Wright	Anna Bourque	June 21, 1999	122
23	23	"Bears"	Chris Kratt	Chris Kratt	June 22, 1999	123
24	24	"Lids"	Steve Wright	Anna Bourque	June 23, 1999	124
25	25	"Great Singers"	Tony Lefresne	Carol Commisso	June 24, 1999	125
26	26	"Playtime"	Martin Kratt	Anna Bourque	June 25, 1999	126
27	27	"Fast and Slow"	Daniel J. Murphy	Chris Kratt	June 28, 1999	127
28	28	"Horses"	Jesse Collins	Jill Golick	June 29, 1999	128
29	29	"Bathtime"	Jesse Collins	Martin Kratt	June 30, 1999	129
30	30	"Jumpers"	Jesse Collins	Chris Kratt	July 1, 1999	130
31	31	"Funny Faces"	Leo Eaton	Steve Westren	July 2, 1999	131
32	32	"Spots and Stripes"	Leo Eaton	Kim Harris	September 6, 1999	132
33	33	"Sand Creatures"	Jesse Collins	Terry Saltsman	September 7, 1999	133
34	34	"Water Creatures"	Jesse Collins	Dan Redican	September 8, 1999	134
35	35	"Who's in the Egg?"	Daniel J. Murphy	Jennifer McAuley-Biasi	September 9, 1999	135
36	36	"Hail to Tails"	Steve Wright	Jill Golick	September 10, 1999	136
37	37	"Cats"	Jesse Collins	Steve Westren	April 24, 2000	137
38	38	"The Four F's"	Jesse Collins	Julie Strassman-Cohn	April 25, 2000	138
39	39	"Stinky"	Leo Eaton	Penny Gay	April 26, 2000	139
40	40	"Bzzz"	Jesse Collins	James Hurst	April 27, 2000	140

=== Season 2 (2000–01) ===
No. overall	No. in season	Title	Directed by	Written by	Original release date	Prod. code
41	1	"Green Creatures"	Jacques Laberge	Chris Kratt	October 3, 2000	201
42	2	"Brain Power"	Jacques Laberge	Anna Bourque	October 10, 2000	202
43	3	"Bovine"	Pierre Roy	Anna Bourque	October 17, 2000	203
44	4	"Snakebellies"	Jacques Laberge	Martin Kratt	October 24, 2000	204
45	5	"Humans"	Jesse Collins	Edith Rey	October 31, 2000	205
46	6	"Super Lemur"	Pierre Roy	Chris Kratt	November 7, 2000	206
47	7	"Pop Goes The Tiger"	Pierre Roy	Martin Kratt	November 14, 2000	207
48	8	"Powerhouse"	Pierre Roy	Anna Bourque	November 21, 2000	208
49	9	"Talk To Me"	Jacques Laberge	Martin Kratt	November 28, 2000	209
50	10	"Flying Buddies"	Pierre Roy	Edith Rey	February 6, 2001	210
51	11	"Creature Neighbors"	Pierre Roy	Chris Kratt	February 13, 2001	211
52	12	"Buddies"	Pierre Roy	Anna Bourque	February 20, 2001	212
53	13	"Can You Feel It?"	Martin Kratt	Martin Kratt	February 27, 2001	213
54	14	"Fearfest"	Pierre Roy	Martin Kratt	March 6, 2001	214
55	15	"Super Claw"	Jacques Laberge	Edith Rey	March 13, 2001	215
56	16	"Grow Zoboo Grow"	Pierre Roy & Jesse Collins	Chris Kratt	March 20, 2001	216
57	17	"Don't Fence Me In"	Pierre Roy & Jacques Laberge	Anna Bourque	March 27, 2001	217
58	18	"Families"	Pierre Roy & Jesse Collins	Chris Kratt	November 12, 2001	218
59	19	"H2O"	Jesse Collins & Jacques Laberge	Mike Erskine-Kellie & John Erskine Kellie	November 13, 2001	219
60	20	"Crocodilian"	Jacques Laberge	Anna Bourque	November 14, 2001	220
61	21	"Hot and Cold"	Pierre Roy	Anna Bourque	November 15, 2001	221
62	22	"Armor"	Pierre Roy & Jesse Collins	Edith Rey	November 16, 2001	222
63	23	"Ants and Eaters"	Chris Kratt	Chris Kratt	November 19, 2001	223
64	24	"World Of Legs"	Pierre Roy	Martin Kratt	November 20, 2001	224
65	25	"Messy and Clean"	Pierre Roy	Edith Rey	November 21, 2001	225

== Awards and nominations ==
Zoboomafoo received the 2001 Emmy for Outstanding Directing in a Children's Series and a Parents' Choice Award for Spring 2001 and Silver Honor for Fall 2001.

== Other media ==
There are also several video games for the PC based on Zoboomafoo, where children learn the alphabet and animals that correlate to each letter. Some of the letters have interactive games to go with them, such as a coloring page.
