= Wild Kratts =

Canadian educational television series from the Kratt brothers

- Genre: Children; Educational; Adventure
- Created by: Chris Kratt; Martin Kratt
- Written by: Chris Kratt; Martin Kratt
- Directed by: Chris Kratt; Martin Kratt; Chris Roy; Louis Champagne
- Presented by: Chris and Martin Kratt
- Voices of: Chris Kratt; Martin Kratt; Athena Karkanis; Heather Bambrick; Sabryn Rock; Jonathan Malen; Zachary Bennett; Eva Almos; Cory Doran; Julie Lemieux
- Theme music composer: Pure West
- Opening theme: "Gonna Go Wild Kratts" by Sterling Jarvis
- Ending theme: "Gonna Go Wild Kratts" (instrumental)
- Composer: Pure West
- Country of origin: Canada
- Original languages: English; French
- No. of seasons: 7
- No. of episodes: 177 (list of episodes)

Production
- Executive producers: Chris Kratt; Martin Kratt; Vince Commisso; Steven Jarosz (seasons 1–5); Blake Tohana (season 6–present)
- Producers: Cheryl Knapp; Chris Kratt; Martin Kratt
- Running time: 26 minutes (52 minutes for specials)
- Production companies: Kratt Brothers Company (Note: As 1757712 Ontario Inc. (season 1), WK 2 Productions Inc. (season 2), WK 3 Productions Inc. (season 3), WK 4 Productions Inc. (season 4), WK 5 Productions Inc. (season 5), WK 6 Productions Inc. (season 6), WK 7 Productions Inc. (season 7), and WK 8 Productions Inc. (season 8)); 9 Story Media Group

Original release
- Network: TVOKids (Ontario, Canada); Knowledge Network (British Columbia, Canada); Tele-Quebec (Quebec, Canada); PBS Kids (US) (Note: Aired as part of PBS Kids Go! until October 6, 2013)
- Release: January 3, 2011 – present

Related
- Be the Creature; Kratts' Creatures; Zoboomafoo

Wild Kratts (French: Les Frères Kratt) is a Canadian educational children's television series that uses a hybrid of live action and animation. The series was created by the Kratt brothers, zoologists Chris and Martin, and produced by The Kratt Brothers Company and 9 Story Media Group, with it airing by TVOKids in Canada, and PBS Kids in the United States. The show's aim is to educate children about species, biology, zoology, ecology, and how small actions can have a big impact. It has ties to the Kratts' previous shows, Kratts' Creatures and Zoboomafoo, and features several characters from the latter.

Starting in 2011, and having aired for over 15 years, Wild Kratts is the longest-running program made by the Kratt Brothers, the fourth in a series of shows produced by them: Kratts' Creatures (1996), Zoboomafoo (1999), and Be the Creature (2003). It was also the last show to premiere on the PBS Kids Go! block before the block was discontinued in 2013 in favour of PBS Kids targeting a broader audience. The show was a finalist for a Peabody Award and a Television Critics Association Award.

== Premise ==
Each episode begins with a cold open live-action segment in which the Kratt brothers describe the characteristics and abilities of a particular species of animal, which they refer to as their "creature powers", that is featured in the episode. They segue into the episode by asking "Imagine we had the powers" of the animal and then posing while saying "What if?" together, transforming them into animated versions of themselves. The episode then transitions to the animated segment, where the brothers go on expeditions to study animals "living free and in the wild." They usually end up rescuing animals from threats caused by a baby animal's confusion, human influence, or villains such as Zach Varmitech, Gaston Gourmand, Donita Donata and Dabio, and Paisley Paver and Rex. Some episodes aim to change how animals, such as bats and crocodiles, are perceived by showing how they are an important part of their habitat.

The Kratt brothers are supported by Aviva Corcovado, a biomechanical engineer who invented "creature power suits", which allow humans to mimic the abilities of animals, and other equipment to aid the brothers in studying animals and defeating villains; Koki, a mechanical engineer and computer expert who maintains their flying turtle ship, the Tortuga; and Jimmy Z, the Tortuga's pilot, who operates the teleporter to send equipment to the brothers and helps Aviva test inventions. Along the way, the team and viewers learn about animals as the team uses creature powers to right wrongs or get out of the situations they find themselves in. They also occasionally enlist the help of the Wild Kratts Kids, children who help the Wild Kratts from their homes in any way they can, whether it be moving animals, helping to rebuild habitats, or providing local knowledge about the animal in question.

At the end of each episode, the animated segment transitions back to the live-action segment, with the Kratt brothers reiterating the animal's powers and, before the end credits, signing off by saying "Keep on creature adventuring! We'll see you on the creature trail!"

== Episodes ==
Season	Episodes	Originally released	
Season	Episodes	First released	Last released
1	40	January 3, 2011	October 25, 2012
2	26	October 15, 2012	January 31, 2014
3	26	April 7, 2014	July 22, 2015
4	26	July 29, 2015	April 14, 2017
5	20	July 24, 2017	January 23, 2019
6	20	April 15, 2019	July 12, 2021
7	20	May 22, 2023	January 18, 2027

== Characters ==
=== Main ===
- Martin Kratt (voiced by himself) is a zoologist who likes to name animals, allowing him, the team, and the audience to bond with the animal. His signature colour and Creature Power suit are blue. While he is childish, fun-loving, and likes to make jokes, he sometimes seems to know more about animals and is more skilled with technology than Chris.
- Chris Kratt (voiced by himself) is a zoologist who is the more methodical of the brothers. His signature colour and Creature Power suit are green. Unlike Martin, he prefers to take his time testing animals and their DNA to understand them better and save them from danger. Chris is organized, intellectual, and calm, but can be narrow-minded. He is also an experienced climber.
- Aviva Corcovado (voiced by Athena Karkanis) is the engineer of the Wild Kratts team. She designs and builds the various gadgets that the team uses, including a matter transporter, which is used to transport equipment to them during expeditions, the miniaturizer, and a time machine. Her most notable inventions are the Creature Power suits, which grant their wearer the abilities of an animal through software disks that are inserted into the suits, and the Tortuga, a turtle-shaped jump jet and spacecraft which is used for transportation and as a home base. Though kind, she can be competitive and overconfident in her abilities and opinions. Her Creature Power suit is purple.
- Koki (voiced by Heather Bambrick from seasons 1–6 and Sabryn Rock since late season 6) is a mechanical engineer and computer expert who works on the Tortuga HQ's computer database, researching animals and tracking the villains via satellite. She also manages the Tortuga's communications system, keeping in touch with Chris and Martin during their missions, managing signals from others who want to communicate with the brothers, and intercepting those sent by the villains. Her Creature Power Suit is golden yellow.
- Jimmy Z (voiced by Jonathan Malen) is the pilot of the Tortuga who also uses his game controller to operate its matter transporter to send items and Creature Power Discs to the Kratts. He also sometimes helps Aviva build inventions by giving her what she needs. His Creature gear is orange and red.

=== Villains ===
- Zachary Varmitech (voiced by Zachary Bennett) is a robotics inventor who knew the Kratts when they were children and met Aviva at summer camp. He seeks to steal the Kratts' technology and attempts to develop robots and inventions by mind-controlling animals and using them as workers or selling them as products. For transport, he uses a jet for long-distance travel and a Zachbot for general travel. He is afraid of the dark, as seen in "Platypus Cafe", and dislikes others telling his Zachbots what to do. He represents the issues of animals being experimented on, being illegally captured and sold for money, and people abusing animals and forcing them to work against their will.
- Gaston Gourmand (voiced by Zachary Bennett) is a gourmet chef who uses wild animals as ingredients in his dishes, especially those considered to be rare and endangered. He is clever and cunning and has a dark sense of humour, as he enjoys seeing the Kratts suffer through the dilemmas he puts them in. In "Outfoxed", he takes in a Basset Hound whom he names Nostril to help him track down animals. He represents the issue of chefs using wild animals as ingredients in dishes.
- Donita Donata (voiced by Eva Almos) is a fashion designer who lives a luxurious lifestyle and travels by a pink jet or boat. She owns the clothing line Donita Donata's Live Jewelry of Nature and uses a "pose beam" to paralyze live animals to sell jewelry or clothing, also using robotic mannequins to capture animals for her. She represents the issue of fashion designers using animal products to make clothing.
- Dabio (voiced by Cory Doran) is Donita's muscular and childlike henchman, who tries to help her design fashion, but often fails to satisfy her. Although usually portrayed as unintelligent, he is better at remembering information about animals than she is.
- Paisley Planter, formerly known as Paisley Paver (voiced by Julie Lemieux), is a businesswoman and the CEO of Pave Nature Incorporated. She believes that turning natural landscapes into factories and parking lots will create a better world for future generations, representing the issue of corporations building over natural habitats. While impatient, demanding, and bossy, she respects her intern, Rex. At the end of "Our Blue and Green World", she retires from villainy and becomes an ally to the Kratts in their efforts to preserve and protect nature. As a villain, she used to represent the issue of animal habitats being threatened by illegal logging and deforestation.
- Rex (voiced by Cory Doran) is Paisley's former henchman, assisting her in her plots against the Kratts. He is not evil, but rather following her out of a love for his job.

== Background and production ==
Wild Kratts is the newest of the Kratt Brothers' television series, preceded by Kratts' Creatures (1996), Zoboomafoo (1999–2001), and Be the Creature (2003–2007). The series combines animation and live action, featuring a live-action intro that sets up the animated segment and introduces the focus animal or focus trait/behaviour if more than one animal is the focus, the main animated segment, and a concluding live-action segment.

Episodes are written by either Chris or Martin Kratt, who also serve as executive producers, Eva Almos, who also voices Donita Donata, or Chris Roy. It is filmed in Canada, the United States, and several other countries. The character designs were done by Ben Balistreri, who also worked on Danny Phantom and Rapunzel's Tangled Adventure.

The series debuted on January 3, 2011 on most PBS stations, and currently has 177 episodes across 7 seasons. International rights were signed by 9 Story in September 2010, with North American rights being held by the Kratt Brothers Company.

PBS Kids often releases episodes out of order. For instance, the episode "Polar Bears Don't Dance", which is the pilot episode but airs as the seventh episode on PBS stations, features an art style different from the rest of the series and was also omitted from the first DVD release. Additionally, it is directed by Luc Chamberland, who did not direct any other episodes. Foreign countries seem to get future episodes before the United States and Canada does, as the episode "Caracal-Minton" aired in South America before it did in English.

The series surpassed the 100th episode milestone in its fourth season with the episode "Animals Who Live to be 100 Years Old," aired as part of PBS Kids' Explore the Outdoors week, making it the first production of the Kratt Brothers to reach that milestone.

After the premiere of "The Great Creature Tail Fail", on October 7, 2020, the series went into hiatus for nine months due to the COVID-19 pandemic and the Kratt Brothers focusing more on live appearances. However, it was later announced that a new episode called "Cats and Dogs" would air on July 12, 2021 as part of the sixth season. Heather Bambrick did not reprise her role as Koki due to controversy over her voicing an African American character, and her role was replaced by black Canadian actress Sabryn Rock. "Cats and Dogs" was the only episode to air in 2021 and served as the Season 6 finale, after which the series went into another hiatus, with no new episodes airing in 2022.

On July 5, 2021, it was announced that the series had begun production on Season 7, which later premiered on May 22, 2023. Additionally, a feature film and autobiography have been confirmed to be in development, with the film being the first theatrical adaptation of the Kratt Brothers' series.

== Broadcast ==
Wild Kratts airs on PBS Kids in the United States and Africa. In Canada it is shown on TVOKids in Ontario, Knowledge Network in British Columbia, and Télé-Québec in Quebec. In Latin America, it is shown on Discovery Kids. In Australia, it is shown on ABC Kids and GO!. In Catalonia, Sx3 (previously Super3) airs dubbed episodes from Seasons 1–6. Season 1 and 2 are available on Netflix Singapore. In the United Kingdom, it is shown on POP. Netflix Canada streams Seasons 3–4.

== Reception ==
Jacqueline Cutler of The Baltimore Sun wrote, "The best of what PBS kids shows can be."

== Home media ==
This is a list of home video DVD releases:

Creature Adventures – April 5, 2011

1. "Mom of a Croc"
2. "Whale of a Squid"
3. "Aardvark Town"
4. "Flight of the Draco"
5. "Mystery of the Squirmy Wormy"
6. "Platypus Café"
7. "Build It Beaver"
8. "Voyage of the Butterflier XT"
9. "Honey Seekers"
10. "Bass Class"

Predator Power – March 20, 2012

1. "Stuck on Sharks"
2. "Mimic"
3. "Little Howler"
4. "Raptor Roundup"
5. "Startup Screen"

Jungle Animals – July 10, 2012

1. "Walk on the Wetside"
2. "A Huge Orange Problem"
3. "Birds of a Feather"
4. "Googly-Eye the Night Guru"

Lost at Sea – January 22, 2013

1. "Speaking Dolphinese"
2. "Blowfish Blowout"

Rainforest Rescue – April 9, 2013

1. "Rainforest Stew"
2. "Shadow: The Black Jaguar"

Bugging Out – February 25, 2014

1. "Secrets of the Spider's Web"
2. "Attack of the Tree-Eating Aliens"

Tiny Trouble – June 10, 2014

1. "Termites vs. Tongues"
2. "Bugs or Monkeys?"

Shark-Tastic! – April 14, 2015

1. "Octopus Wildkratticus"
2. "Tortuga Tune Up"
3. "Speaking Dolphinese"
4. "Stuck on Sharks"

Super Sprinters – June 23, 2015

1. "Falcon City"
2. "Cheetah Racer"

Australian Adventures – January 6, 2016

1. "Koala Balloon"
2. "Kickin' It With the 'Roos"
3. "Platypus Café"

Wild Animal Babies – May 3, 2016

1. "Elephant in the Room"
2. "Bad Hair Day"
3. "Zig-Zagged"
4. "Let the Rhinos Roll!"

Wild Reptiles – August 23, 2016

1. "The Gecko Effect"
2. "Crocogator Contest"
3. "Rattlesnake Crystal"
4. "Chameleons on Target"

A Creature Christmas – October 4, 2016

Panda-Monium – April 2017

1. "Panda Power-Up"
2. "Red Panda Rescue"
3. "Colors of China"
4. "Snowy Owl Invasion"

Wild Winter Creatures – October 10, 2017

1. "Polar Bears Don't Dance"
2. "Mystery of the Weird Looking Walrus"
3. "Journey to the Subnivean Zone"
4. "Musk Ox Mania"

Triple Feature: Rainforest Rescue, Lost at Sea, and Predator Power

1. Stuck on Sharks
2. Mimic
3. Little Howler
4. Raptor Round Up
5. Speaking Dolphinese
6. Blowfish Blowout
7. Rainforest Stew
8. Shadow the Black Jaguar

Around the World Adventure: With 22 episodes

1. Tazzy Chris
2. Kerhonk!
3. Search for the Florida Panther
4. Golden Bamboo Lemur
5. Tenrec Treasure Hunt
6. Mimic
7. Back in Creature Time:Day of the Dodo
8. Back in Creature Time:Tasmanian Tiger
9. Liturgusa Krattorum
10. Eel-lectric!
11. Cheetah Adopted
12. Temple of Tigers
13. The Dhole Duplicator
14. A Huge Orange Problem
15. Shadow the Black Jaguar
16. The Food Chain Game
17. Cheetah Racer
18. Rainforest Stew
19. Sloth Bear Suction
20. The Amazing Creature Race
21. Caracal-Minton
22. Amazin' Amazon Adventure!

Madagascar Madness

1. Lemur Legs
2. Lemur Stink Fight
3. Fossa-Palooza
4. Mini Madagascar

Adventures on the African Savanna

1. The Food Chain Game
2. Creature Power Challenge

Cats and Dogs

1. Cats and Dogs
2. Spots in the Desert
3. Adapto the Coyote
4. Little Howler

The Briny Blue Sea

1. "Sea Otter Swim"
2. "Aye-Aye"
3. "Osprey"
4. "Puffin Rescue"

Creepy Creatures

1. "Masked Bandits"
2. "Creepy Creatures"

PBS Kids: 20 Snowy Tales

1. Snow Runners

PBS Kids: 20 Sports Stories

1. Cheetah Racer

PBS Kids: 20 Furry Tales

1. Slider the Otter (missing intro and ending live-action segments)

PBS Kids: 15 Sports Tales

1. Road Runner
2. City Hoppers!

PBS Kids: 15 Frozen Tales

1. Under Frozen Pond
2. Musk Ox Mania

PBS Kids: Ocean Adventures

1. Rocket Jaw: Rescuer of the Reef
2. Capture the Fishmobile

PBS Kids: 15 Pet-Tastic Tails!

1. Little Howler

PBS Kids: 20 Music Tales

1. Birds of a Feather

PBS Kids: 20 Incredible Tales

1. Fireflies
2. Pangolin Rescue

PBS Kids: Happy Birthday!

1. Quillber's Birthday Present (missing live-action intro segment)

PBS Kids: Christmas Collection

1. A Creature Christmas

PBS KIDS: Play Date Triple Feature!

1. "Mystery of the Flamingo's Pink"
2. "Deer Buckaroo"
3. "Real Ant Farm"
4. "Mystery of the Mini Monkey Models"

PBS KIDS: Secret Superheroes!

1. "Great Froggyback Ride"

PBS KIDS: Just A Little Bit Spooky!

1. "The Cobra King"

PBS KIDS: We Love Camping!

1. "Googly Eye: The Night Guru"

PBS KIDS: Get Up and Dance!

1. "Bird of a Feather"

PBS KIDS: 17 Puppy Adventures

1. "The Dhole Duplicator"

PBS KIDS: 15 Sibling Stories

1. "The Other Martins"

PBS KIDS: Barnyard Buddies

1. "The Real Ant Farm"

PBS KIDS: Four Seasons of Fun

1. "Journey to the Subnivean Zone"

PBS KIDS: Birthday Bash

1. "Quillber's Birthday Present"

PBS KIDS: Every Day Is Earth Day

1. "Our Blue and Green World"

Wildest Animal Adventures

1. "Mom of a Croc"
2. "Whale of a Squid"
3. "Aardvark Town"
4. "Flight of the Draco"
5. "Mystery of the Squirmy Wormy"
6. "Platypus Café"
7. "Build It Beaver"
8. "Voyage of the Butterflier XT"
9. "Honey Seekers"
10. "Bass Class"
11. "Stuck on Sharks"
12. "Mimic"
13. "Little Howler"
14. "Raptor Roundup"
15. "Walk on the Wetside"
16. "A Huge Orange Problem"
17. "Birds of a Feather"
18. "Googly-Eye the Night Guru"
19. "Speaking Dolphinese"
20. "Blowfish Blowout"

== Other media ==
A Wild Kratts magazine appeared in Walmart in October 2017. It had animals from when the show's premiere 2011 to about until 2017.

In 2016, Whole Foods Market introduced a line of products including crackers, vitamins, and soap carrying the Wild Kratts branding.

Two theatrical live shows based on the animated series premiered at an unknown time at a large stage. The first stage show featured the Kratt Brothers leaping out of the animation and interacting with the audience, and later using their Creature Power Suits to rescue the miniaturizer from Zach Varmitech. A theatrical sequel to that live show in 2019 titled Wild Kratts Live 2.0: Activate Creature Power! premiered at a live stage. The live stage performance had featured the live-action Kratt Brothers shrinking down and exploring, only to later rescue their Creature Power discs from Zach.
