= List of fictional primates in television =

This is a list of fictional non-human primates in television, and is a subsidiary to the list of fictional primates.

Name	Species	Origin	Notes
Galen	Chimpanzee	Planet of the Apes	Simian friend of 2 American astronauts who crash land on a future earth where apes rule and humans are slaves. Played by Roddy McDowall
Adam	Chimpanzee	Ark II	An intelligent chimpanzee capable of speech. Part of the crew of the Ark II.
Bingo	Gorilla	The Banana Splits	Member of The Banana Splits, an all-animal band. He played the drums.
Bear	Chimpanzee	B. J. and the Bear	Clothed pet chimpanzee
Bobo, Cha Cha	Orangutan	Mr. Smith	Cha Cha was a talking orangutan with IQ of 256.
Bollo	Gorilla	The Mighty Boosh	Talking Gorilla
Buttons	Chimpanzee	Me and the Chimp	Buttons was a washout chimpanzee from the space program.
Cha-Ka	Orangutan	Land of the Lost	
Davey and Joey	Monkey	Sesame Street	Davey and Joey are two muppet monkey duos who appear on Sesame Street. They love "BANANAS!" And their names are based on their performers: David Rudman and Joey Mazzarino
Dr. Rizzo	Capuchin monkey	Animal Practice	Acted by Crystal the Monkey.
Forever	Orangutan	JoJo's Bizarre Adventure	An orangutang that appears in season 2:episode 7 "Strength" within a giant freighter and is seen to enjoy reading Playboy, eating oranges, and solving puzzle cubes similar to a Rubik's Cube.
Gerald	Gorilla	Not The Nine O'Clock News	A captured gorilla being interviewed in a parody news show. First aired April 28, 1980 in series 2, episode 5.
Gladys	Chimpanzee	Gilligan's Island	Female ape that befriended Gilligan in the episode "Beauty Is As Beauty Does" and wins the "Miss Castaway" pageant.
Lancelot Link	Chimpanzee	Lancelot Link, Secret Chimp	
Nurse Precious	Orangutan	Passions	Soap opera orangutan
J. Fred Muggs	Chimpanzee	The Today Show	Reality. Appeared as himself on the news show
Judy	Chimpanzee	Daktari	Pet of Dr. Tracy
Jungle Master Rilla	Gorilla	Power Rangers Jungle Fury	
Oko	Baboon	It's a Big Big World	
Professor Bobo	Gorilla	Mystery Science Theater 3000	
Sal Minella	Chimpanzee	Muppets Tonight	
Smash	Gorilla	Power Rangers Beast Morphers	Ravi's Beast Bot partner
Stink	Orangutan	Land of the Lost	
Smooch and Winslow	Common marmoset	It's a Big Big World	
Tarsiera	Philippine tarsier	Oyayi	A lovable character and the youngest member of Pangkat Oyayi.
Treelo	Ring-tailed lemur	Bear in the Big Blue House	
Zoboomafoo	Coquerel's sifaka	Zoboomafoo	Titular puppet lemur sometimes portrayed by real lemur Jovian (lemur)

== See also ==
- List of fictional primates
