= Cat meat =

Meat from domestic cats for human consumption

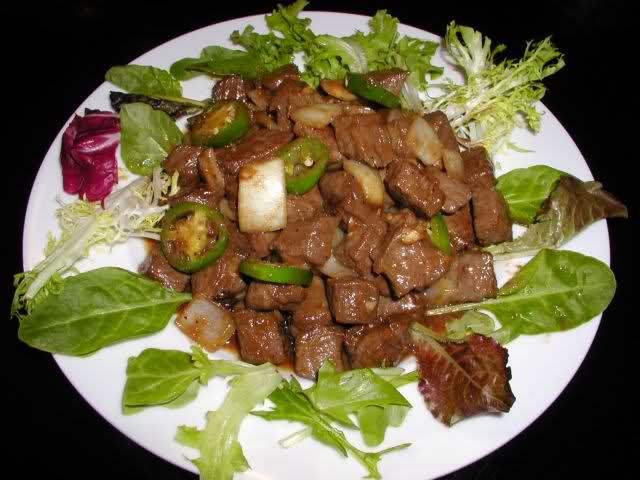
A dish of cat meat in Vietnam.

Cat meat is meat prepared from domestic cats for human consumption. Some countries regularly serve cat meat, whereas others have only consumed some cat meat in desperation during wartime, famine or poverty.

== History ==
Prehistoric human feces have been found to contain bones from the wild cats of Africa.

There are accounts from antiquity of cats being consumed in the Roman province of Gallia Narbonensis (southern France). During the 18th century, domestic cats were used in the meat production in France, with published recipes surviving from 1740. Cats were eaten in Spain during the 17th century.

Cat meat has also been tied to folklore and stereotypes in places like Vietnam and Vicenza, Italy.

Cat meat was widely used as famine food during wartime, especially during both World Wars.

== Africa ==
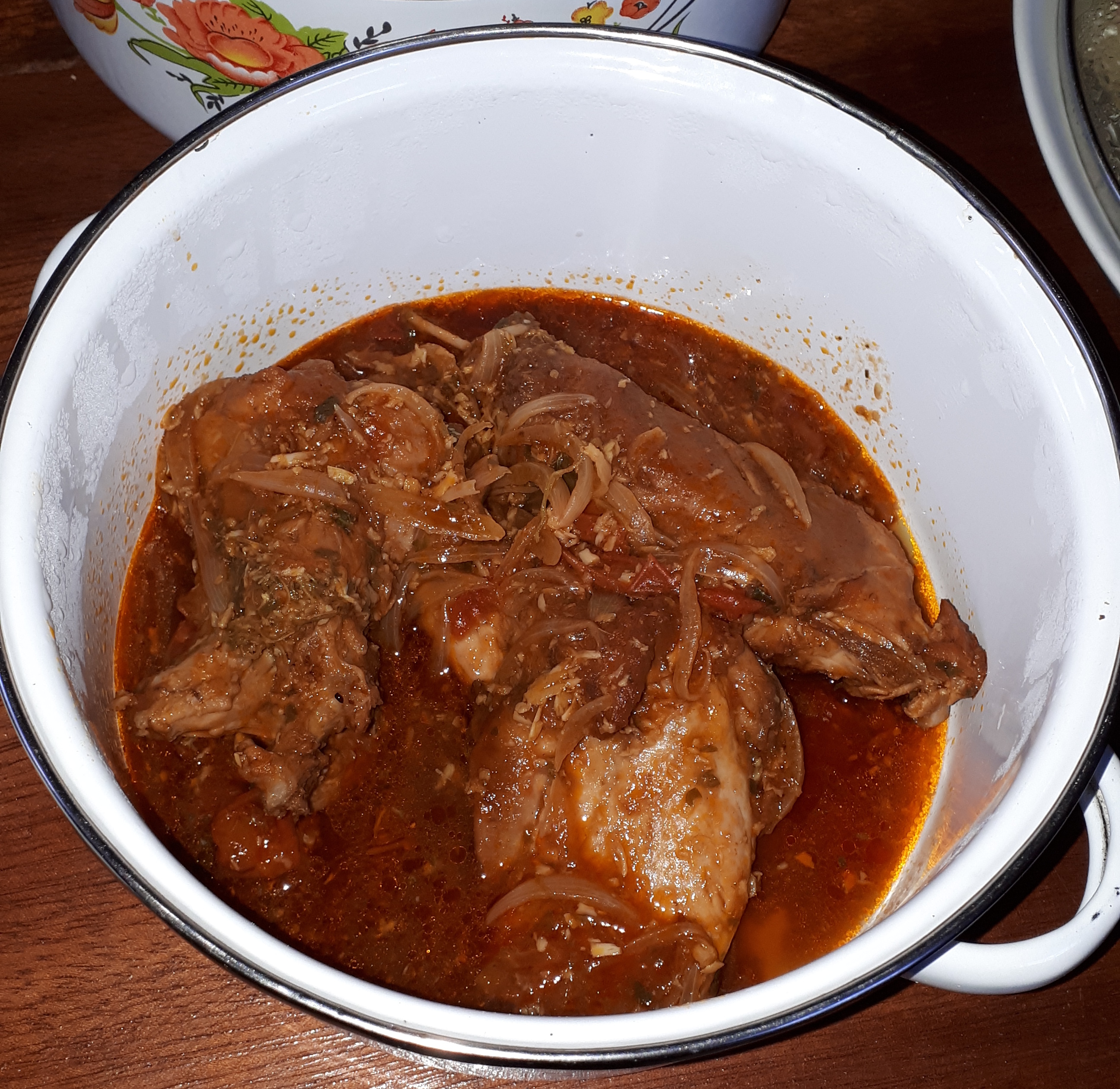
Cat-based dish, cooked in the Central African Republic.

In some cultures of Cameroon, there is a special ceremony featuring cat-eating that is thought to bring good luck.

=== Madagascar ===
In Madagascar, residents trap and consume invasive feral forest cats. Another morph of invasive feral cat, the fitoaty, is considered taboo to eat, and some residents believe its meat to be poisonous. The most prevalent source of cat meat, however, is from domestic cats; consumption of cat meat in the country is not generally linked with food insecurity, and varies geographically due to the presence of taboos.

== Asia ==
=== China ===
According to Humane Society International, Agence France-Presse, and the BBC, cat meat is not widely eaten in China. However, in Guangdong and Guangxi provinces of the Lingnan cultural region, some—especially older—people consider cat meat a good warming food during winter months. In Guangdong, cat meat is a main ingredient in the traditional dish "dragon, tiger, phoenix" (snake, cat, chicken), which is said to fortify the body.

Organized cat-collectors supply the southern restaurants with animals that often originate in Henan, Hubei, Anhui, and Jiangsu provinces. On January 26, 2010, China launched its first draft proposal to protect the country's animals from maltreatment, including a measure to jail people—for periods up to 15 days—for eating cat or dog meat.

In January 2006, the Chinese Animal Protection Network began organizing protests against dog and cat consumption, starting in Guangzhou, following up in more than ten other cities "with very optimal response from public." Beijing News reported in 2014 and 2015 of Beijing and Tianjin authorities, respectively, discovering feral, and stray cats to be used as part of the cat meat trade, which drew outrage from many Chinese netizens. A 2015 Animals Asia survey found that at least more than 70-80% of Chinese respondents agreed it was not acceptable to eat dogs and cats if they had been abused or tortured during feeding and slaughter.

==== Hong Kong ====
In Hong Kong, the Dogs and Cats Ordinance was introduced by the British Hong Kong Government on 6 January 1950. It prohibits the slaughter of any dog or cat for use as food by fine and imprisonment.

=== India ===
According to HuffPost and a few Indian news outlets in 2016, cat meat was being served as mutton in parts of Chennai and being consumed mainly by the Narikuravar community in the city. There had been allegations made online in the same year that some Narikuravar people were hunting feral and stray cats for their meat in Bengaluru.

Cat meat is a traditional protein consumed in the diet of the Irula people of southern India.

=== Indonesia ===
Cat meat has been featured at the Extreme Market in the North Sulawesi city of Tomohon.

=== South Korea ===
In South Korea, cat meat was historically brewed into a tonic as a folk remedy for neuralgia and arthritis, not commonly as food. Modern consumption is seen and more likely to be in the form of cat soup, though the number of people who consume cat soup is small compared to the relatively popular dog meat. Julien Dugnoille wrote in The Conversation that cat meat is mostly consumed by middle-aged working-class women for perceived health benefits, and that usually 10 cats are needed to produce a small bottle of cat, or goyangi, soju (an alcoholic elixir thought to keep arthritis at bay for a few weeks at a time).

According to the animal protection organization, In Defense of Animals, 100,000 cats are killed yearly to make cat soju in South Korea. Cats are not farmed for their meat in the country, so the trade involves ferals and strays.

=== Malaysia ===
According to the Malaysian branch of Friends of the Earth, cat meat is not illegal in Malaysia. The organisation reported that some Vietnamese nationals had been selling dog and cat meat in a couple of cities, an allegation repeated by Coconuts Media. According to The Star in 2012, cat meat was popular among some Myanmar nationals in the country.

=== Taiwan ===
In 2001, Taiwan officially banned the sale of cat and dog meat. In October 2017, Taiwan's national legislature, known as the Legislative Yuan, passed amendments to the country's Animal Protection Act which "bans the sale and consumption of dog and cat meat and of any food products that contain the meat or other parts of these animals", making it the first Asian country to ban the consumption of cat meat and dog meat.

=== Vietnam ===
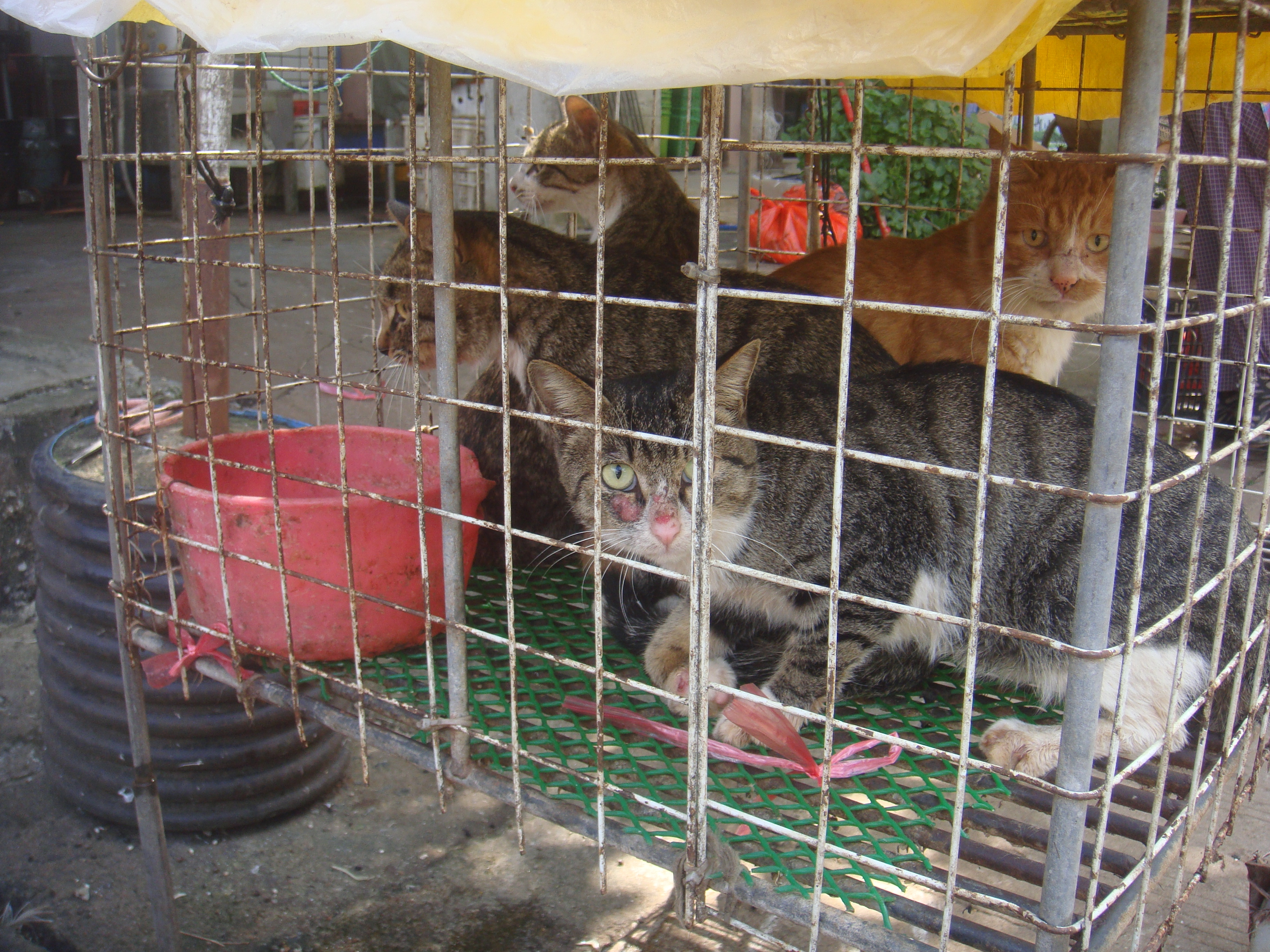
Cats at a cat meat restaurant in Vietnam

As of 2015, cat meat is eaten in Vietnam. It is generally seen on menus with the euphemism "tiểu hổ", literally "little tiger" or "baby tiger", rather than the literal "thịt mèo". Cat galls have aphrodisiacal properties, according to people in Northern Vietnam. In 2018, however, officials in the city of Hanoi urged citizens to stop eating dog and cat meat, citing concerns about the cruel methods with which the animals are slaughtered and the diseases this practice propagates, including rabies and leptospirosis. Another reason for this exhortation seems to be a concern that the practice of dog and cat consumption, most of which are stolen household pets, could tarnish the city's image as a "civilised and modern capital". According to data from a market research study by Four Paws, approximately 8% of people living in Hanoi have consumed cat meat in their lives.

According to The Independent in April 2020, COVID-19 led to increased dog and cat meat sales in Vietnam (and Cambodia) due to their perceived health benefits against the virus.

== Europe ==
=== Austria ===
Section 6, Paragraph 2 of the law for the protection of animals enacted in 2004 prohibits the killing of cats and dogs for purposes of consumption as food or for other products.

=== Belgium ===
In January 2011, the Belgian Federal Agency for the Safety of the Food Chain stated that people are not allowed to kill random cats walking in their garden, but "nowhere in the law does it say that you can't eat your own pet cat, dog, rabbit, fish, or whatever. You just have to kill them in an animal-friendly way and only when necessary."

=== Denmark ===
In June 2008, three students at the Danish School of Media and Journalism published pictures of a cat being slaughtered and eaten in Citat, a magazine for journalism students to create a debate about animal welfare. The cat was shot by its owner, a farmer, and it would have been put down in any case. The farmer slaughtered the cat within the limits of Danish law. This led to criticism from Danish animal welfare group Dyrenes Beskyttelse, and death threats received by the students.

=== Germany ===
§22(1a) of the Animal-Derived Food Sanitation Act prohibits the production and trade in meat of dogs, cats, monkeys and apes for human consumption.

=== Italy ===
In February 2010, on a television cooking show, the Italian food writer Beppe Bigazzi mentioned that during the famine in World War II, cat stew was a "succulent" and well-known dish in his home area of Valdarno, Tuscany. Later he claimed he had been joking, but added that cats used to be eaten in the area during famine periods, historically. He was widely criticised in the media for his comments and was ultimately dropped from the television network.

Cat consumption is a stereotype attributed to Vicenzans in Vicenza, Italy. They are jokingly called "magnagati", that means "cats eaters" in the local language.

According to the British Butchers' Advocate, Dressed Poultry and the Food Merchant of 1904, "Just before Christmas, it is common for a group of young men in northern Italy to kill some cats, skin them, and soak them in water for two or three days. They are cooked with great care on Christmas day and served up hot about 1:30 p.m. after mass....Many people in Italy, 'on the quiet,' keep cats like the English do rabbits—to kill. A catskin there is worth ten pence, as the material for muffs for girls... Extraordinary care has to be taken in procuring the animals, for the Italian Society for the Protection of Cats is vigilant, and offenses against the law are followed by imprisonment only. We have no fines in Italy."

According to The Dietetic & Hygienic Gazette in 1905, "Italy cultivates the cat for home consumption as English people raise rabbits. It is to be done on the quiet, however, for in spite of the profit in the business and the demand for the delicacy, the law has to be looked out for, and the Society for the Prevention of Cruelty to Cats is vigilant. Offenses against the law are visited with imprisonment. Cats are raised for the market, nonetheless. Fattened on the finest of milk, a choice specimen will attain the weight of fifteen pounds."

The Genoese song "Crêuza de mä", with lyrics by Fabrizio De André, cites the sweet-and-sour hash of "hare of roof tiles" (i.e., the cat, passed off as a sort of rabbit meat).

=== Switzerland ===
According to the Food Safety and Veterinary Office, the sale of dog or cat meat is not allowed, but it is legal for people to eat their own animals. The Swiss parliament rejected changing the laws to protect dogs and cats from human consumption in 1993. An animal-rights group collected 16,000 signatures in 2014 to outlaw the consumption of cat meat in Switzerland.

=== Other areas ===
Cats were sometimes eaten as a famine food during harsh winters, poor harvests, and wartime. Cats gained notoriety as "roof rabbit" (Dachhase) in Central Europe's hard times during and between World War I and World War II.

== Oceania ==
=== Australia ===
Indigenous Australians in the area of Alice Springs roast feral cats on an open fire. They have also developed recipes for cat stew. Some other inhabitants of the area have also taken up this custom, justified on the grounds that felines are "a serious threat to Australia's native fauna".

== South and North America ==
=== Argentina ===
In two 1996 TV reports from different networks, Telefe Noticias and Todo Noticias, some citizens in a shanty town in Rosario, Santa Fe, Argentina, stated that, during an economic crisis, they had to feed the neighborhood children with cat meat, and commented, "It's not denigrating to eat cat, it keeps a child's stomach full".

Although the validity of these reports has been questioned in a book by journalists Gabriel Russo and Edgardo Miller, these authors didn't produce any evidence nor taped confession of someone stating that was responsible for the forgery. Moreover, it's been reported that the then-mayor of Rosario was the source of the rumor that the TV networks fabricated the story just to discredit the city's municipal government. In 2013, Josefa Villalba, a former municipal council member in 1996, stated that prior to the TV reports, she reported to the local municipal government the fact that children were being fed with cats, but the municipal government heads tried to silence her. Contemporary reporting by the journalist Ricardo Luque of La Nación, a newspaper of record of Argentina, reproduced a quote from an inhabitant of the shanty town, "When the kids come to ask for something to eat, there's no point in giving them anything, so we go out and hunt cats, anything to feed them".

=== Peru ===
Cat is not a regular menu item in Peru, but is used in such dishes as fricassee and stews most abundant in two specific sites in the country: the southern town of Chincha Alta (Ica Region, Afro-Peruvian mostly) and the north-central Andean town of Huari (Ancash Region). Primarily used by Afro-Peruvians, cat cooking techniques are demonstrated every September during a festival known as "El Festival Gastronomico del Gato" (the Gastronomic Festival of the Cat) or "Miaustura", part of the festival of Saint Efigenia in the town of La Quebrada in San Luis District, Cañete.

In October 2013, a judge banned the annual festival, which was held every September in La Quebrada to commemorate the arrival of settlers who were forced to eat cats to survive, citing it as cruel to the 100+ cats specifically bred for the event, which involves being kept in cages for a year prior to the Festival. The judge also cited concerns over the safety of the meat, which drew criticism from residents who contend that cat meat is far richer than rabbit or duck, and that it has long been consumed globally without any deleterious effects. The festival was nevertheless held again in 2017.

That same month, magistrate María Luyo banned the festival of Curruñao in the small town of San Luis. Locals say that the festival, which sees cats being drowned, skinned, and tied to fireworks and blown up, dates back to the practice of eating cat on the part of African slaves who worked on sugar-cane plantations in colonial times, and is part of the religious celebrations of Santa Efigenia, an African-Peruvian folk saint. Luyo stated in her ruling that the festival "fomented violence based on cruel acts against animals which caused grave social damage and damaged public health", and that minors could be "psychologically damaged" by watching the events.

=== United States ===
In December 2018, the Dog and Cat Meat Trade Prohibition Act of 2018 was signed into federal law, making the commercial slaughter and trade cat (and dog) meat illegal when affecting interstate or foreign commerce, punishable by a fine of up to $5,000 per violation, except when carried out by Native Americans as part of religious ceremonies. Previous to that bill, consuming cat meat was legal in 44 states.

== Religion ==
=== Islam ===
According to Islamic dietary laws, the consumption of cat meat is Haram as it is considered a terrestrial predator.

=== Judaism ===
Jewish Kashrut laws forbid consuming cat meat as it is a predator. As well as not being a predator, a mammal must both chew cud and have cloven hooves in order to be considered kosher.

== Opposition to cat meat consumption ==
As the ownership of cats as pets has become increasingly popular in China, opposition to cat meat consumption has also grown. In June 2006, a group of 40 animal welfare activists stormed Fangji Restaurant in Shenzhen, a restaurant specializing in cat meat, and managed to force the restaurant to stop selling cat meat.

This occurred approximately two years after the establishment of the Chinese Animal Protection Network (CAPN), which began organizing well-publicized protests against the consumption of dog and cat meat in January 2006, initially in Guangzhou and then in more than ten other cities.

In February 2020, Four Paws published the market analysis report, “The Dog and Cat Meat Trade in Southeast Asia: A Threat to Animals and People", and together with the Change For Animals Foundation, called on the government of Vietnam to reinstate previous laws explicitly prohibiting the trade of cat meat.

== See also ==
- Dog meat
- Horse meat
- List of meat animals
- Taboo food and drink
- Springfield, Ohio, cat-eating hoax
