= Ring-tailed lemur vocalizations =

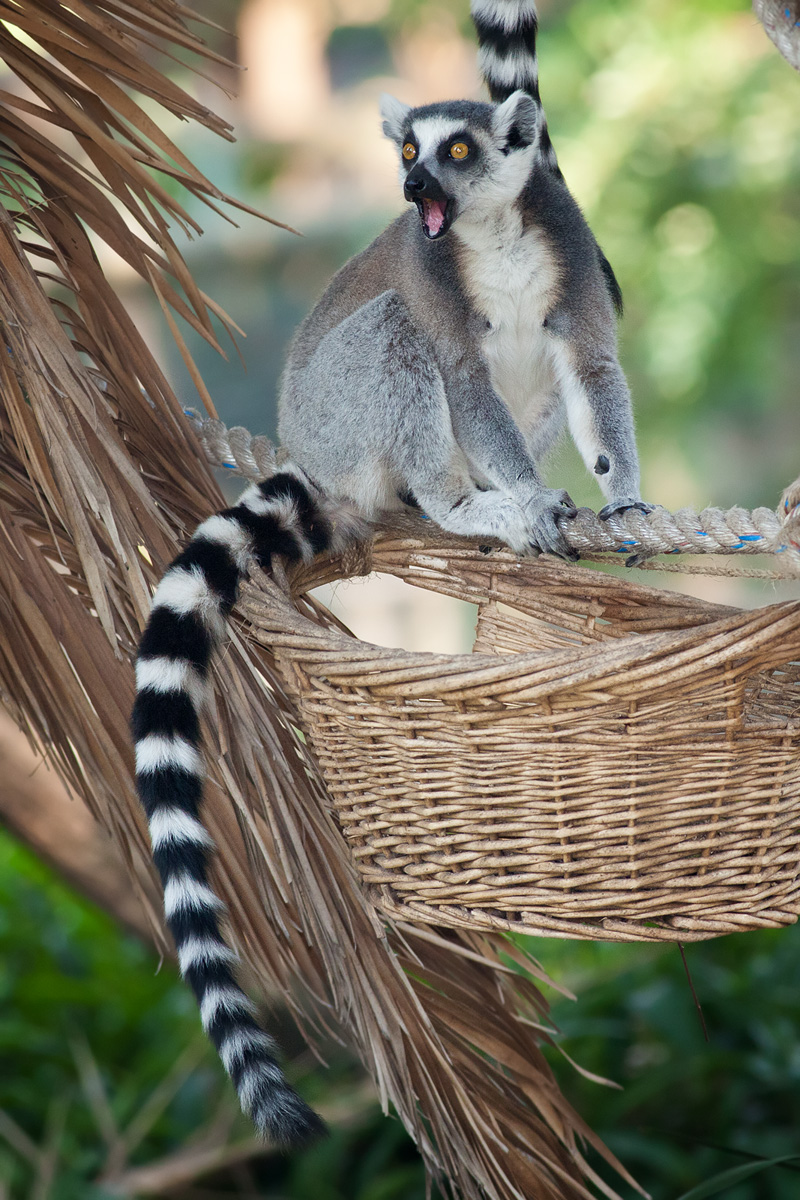
Adult vocalizing

The ring-tailed lemur has a complex array of distinct vocalizations used to maintain group cohesion during foraging and alert group members to the presence of a predator. The tables below detail calls documented in the wild and studied at the Duke Lemur Center.

Adult Affiliative Vocalizations
Call	Vocalizers	Inferred Function
Moan sample 1 sample 2	All except infants <14 weeks	Promotes group cohesion in low-to-moderate arousal contexts
Early-High Wail sample 1 sample 2	All except infants <6–8 weeks	Promotes group cohesion; indicates moderate-to-high level arousal level of caller
Late-High Wail sample 1 sample 2 sample 3	Non-infant females (typically), males (rarely)	May promote group cohesion under conditions of extreme arousal
Howl sample 1 sample 2	Non-infant males	Male advertisement call; together with female counter-calling, howls advertise the presence and location of the group
Hmm sample 1 sample 2	All except infants <5 weeks	Indicates that slow group relocation is imminent and promotes group cohesion, or reflects a caller's desire to maintain conspecific contact
Huh sample 1 sample 2	Infants >3 months (most frequent); male juveniles and adolescents; rarely by adults	Similar to hmm, but marks a caller's location more effectively
Purr sample	Adult females (most frequent); both sexes of all age classes	Appears to express contentment; also may communicate nonaggressive intent of an adult during close contact
Chirp sample 1 sample 2 sample 3 sample 4	All except infants <3 weeks	Elicits rapid group movement and may promote group cohesion in this context

Adult Agonistic Vocalizations
Call	Vocalizers	Inferred Function
Yip sample 1 sample 2 sample 3	All non-infants, except alpha females	Expresses mild fear and, perhaps, willingness to defer to a dominant
Cackle sample 1 sample 2 sample 3 sample 4 sample 5	Adults of both sexes	A defensive display that may reflect a willingness to become aggressive if pressed
Squeal sample 1 sample 2	Males, during tail waving only	Male "status assertion" vocalization
Twitter sample	All except infants <6 months	Communicates somewhat fearful but nevertheless assertive demeanor
Plosive Bark sample 1 sample 2 sample 3 sample 4	Both sexes of all ages classes	High-intensity threat vocalization
Chutter sample	Dominant adults (toward subordinates of all ages)	Low-to-moderate threat vocalization; may encourage subordinates to give way to dominants, thereby reaffirming dyadic dominance relationships.

Alerting & Antipredator Vocalizations
Call	Vocalizers	Inferred Function
Gulp sample 1 sample 2	All except infants <14 weeks	Generalized "group alert" vocalization
Rasp sample 1 sample 2 sample 3 sample 4	All except infants	Aerial predator alarm call
Shriek, variant 1 sample 1 sample 2 sample 3	All except infants	May serve to inform a raptor that it has been seen, and/or may discourage pursuit by intimidation, as well as to broadcast widely that a low-flying raptor has been detected
Shriek, variant 2 sample 1 sample 2	All except infants	Same as variant 1, except that variant 2 may express the more urgent nature of the aerial predator encounter.
Click sample 1 sample 2 sample 3	All except infants <2 weeks	The click is a low-arousal "location marker" that draws attention to a caller.
Close-Mouth Click Series (CMCS) sample	All except infants <2 months	Moderate-arousal "location marker"
Open-Mouth Click Series (OMCS) sample	All except infants	A "location marker" reserved for a limited number of contexts of very high arousal; also appears to serve as a cue that aids in the synchronization of yaps
Yap sample	All except infants	Carnivore mobbing call

Infant Affiliative Vocalizations
Call	Inferred Function
Infant Contact Call sample 1 sample 2 sample 3 sample 4	Conspecific vocal contact; functions initially to attract the mother and later as a precursor to moans and wails
Infant Trill, variant 1 sample 1 sample 2	Expresses desire for, and contentment from, conspecific contact
Infant Trill, variant 2 sample 1 sample 2	May express contentment and/or crossing the sensory threshold from contentment to discomfort

Infant Distress Vocalizations
Call	Inferred Function
Infant Whit, variant 1 sample	Infant distress call; expresses discomfort and/or distress
Infant Whit, variant 2 sample 1 sample 2	Infant high-intensity distress call
Infant Yelp sample 1 sample 2 sample 3	Serves both as an affiliative and distress vocalization in eliciting prompt retrieval by the mother
