= List of invasive species in Madagascar =

Invasive species in Madagascar are organisms not native to the island, but which have been brought to Madagascar by human activity and which pose a threat to native Malagasy biodiversity. Because of its unique endemic biota, Malagasy ecosystems are vulnerable to disturbance from introduced species. It is estimated that around 50-60 animal and 1,500 vascular plant species have been introduced to the island; the latter category constitutes roughly 8.9% of all plant species on the island.

== Amphibians ==
Scientific name	Common name	Notes	Reference	Image
Duttaphrynus melanostictus	Asian common toad			
Hoplobatrachus tigerinus	Indian bullfrog	Introduced for human consumption.		

== Mammals ==
Scientific name	Common name	Notes	Reference	Image
Potamochoerus larvatus	Bushpig			
Bos primigenius indicus	Zebu			
Viverricula indica	Small Indian Civet			
Felis catus	Feral cat	Multiple morphotypes, including fitoaty and Malagasy forest cat.		
Canis lupus familiaris	Feral dog			
