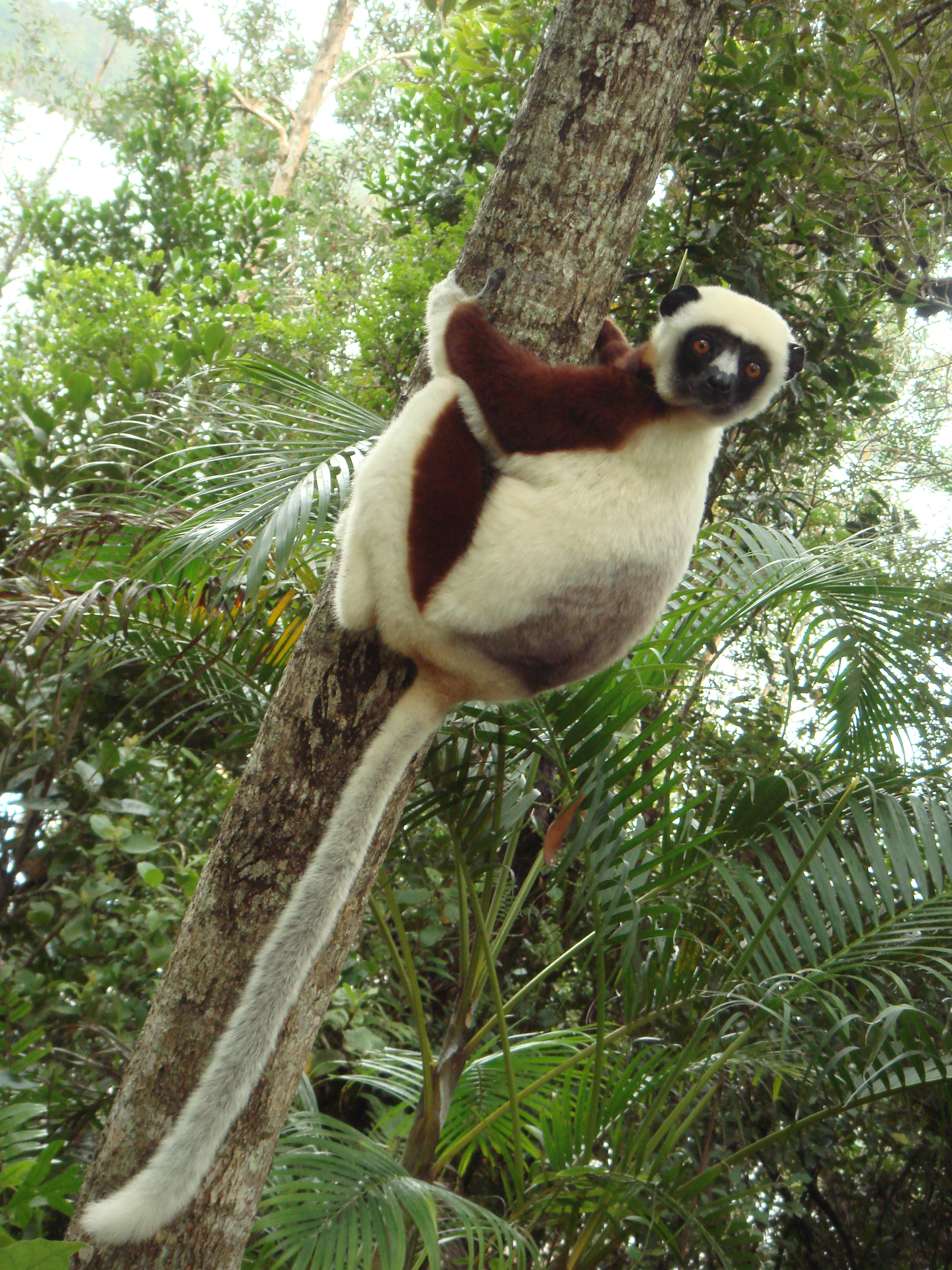

Conservation status
- Critically Endangered (IUCN 3.1)
- CITES Appendix I

Scientific classification
- Kingdom: Animalia
- Phylum: Chordata
- Class: Mammalia
- Infraclass: Placentalia
- Order: Primates
- Suborder: Strepsirrhini
- Family: Indriidae
- Genus: Propithecus
- Species: P. coquereli

Binomial name
- Propithecus coquereli A. Grandidier, 1867
- Distribution of P. coquereli

Synonyms
- damonis Gray, 1870

= Coquerel's sifaka =

Diurnal, medium-sized lemur

Coquerel's sifaka (Propithecus coquereli) is a diurnal, medium-sized lemur of the sifaka genus Propithecus. It is native to northwest Madagascar. Coquerel's sifaka was once considered a subspecies of Verreaux's sifaka but was eventually granted full species status. It is listed as Critically Endangered on the IUCN Red List due to habitat loss and hunting.

In popular culture, the title character in the children's TV show Zoboomafoo is a Coquerel's sifaka. The species was named after French entomologist Charles Coquerel.

== Description ==
The dorsal pelage and tail of Coquerel's sifaka are white, and it has maroon patches on the chest and portions of the limbs. The coat is generally dense. Its face is bare and black except for a distinctive patch of white fur along the bridge of the nose. Its naked ears are also black, and its eyes are yellow or orange. The bottom of the lemur's hands and feet are black, while the thighs, arms, and chest are chocolate brown. Like all lemurs, Coquerel's sifaka has a toothcomb, used for grooming and sometimes scraping fruit off a pit.

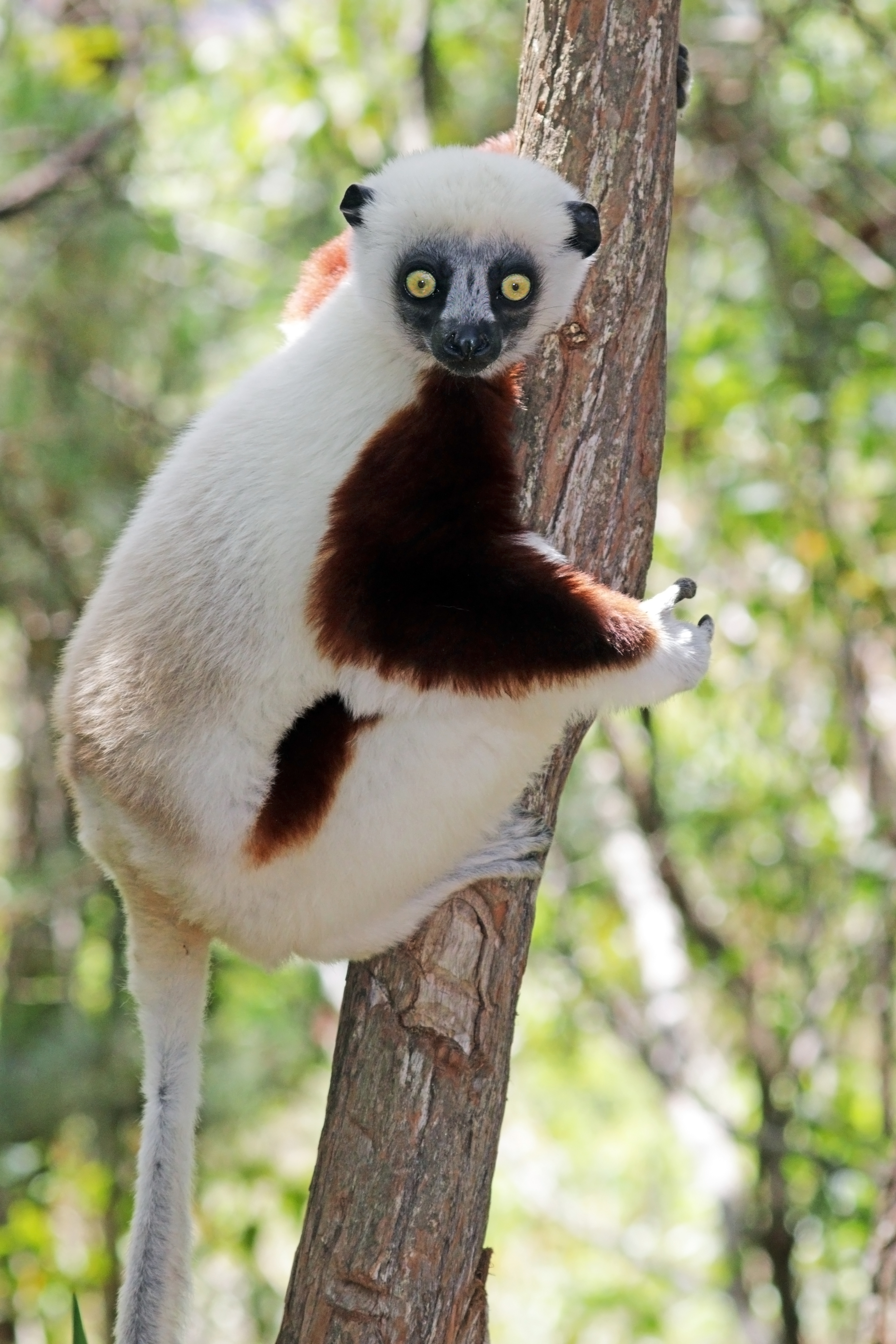

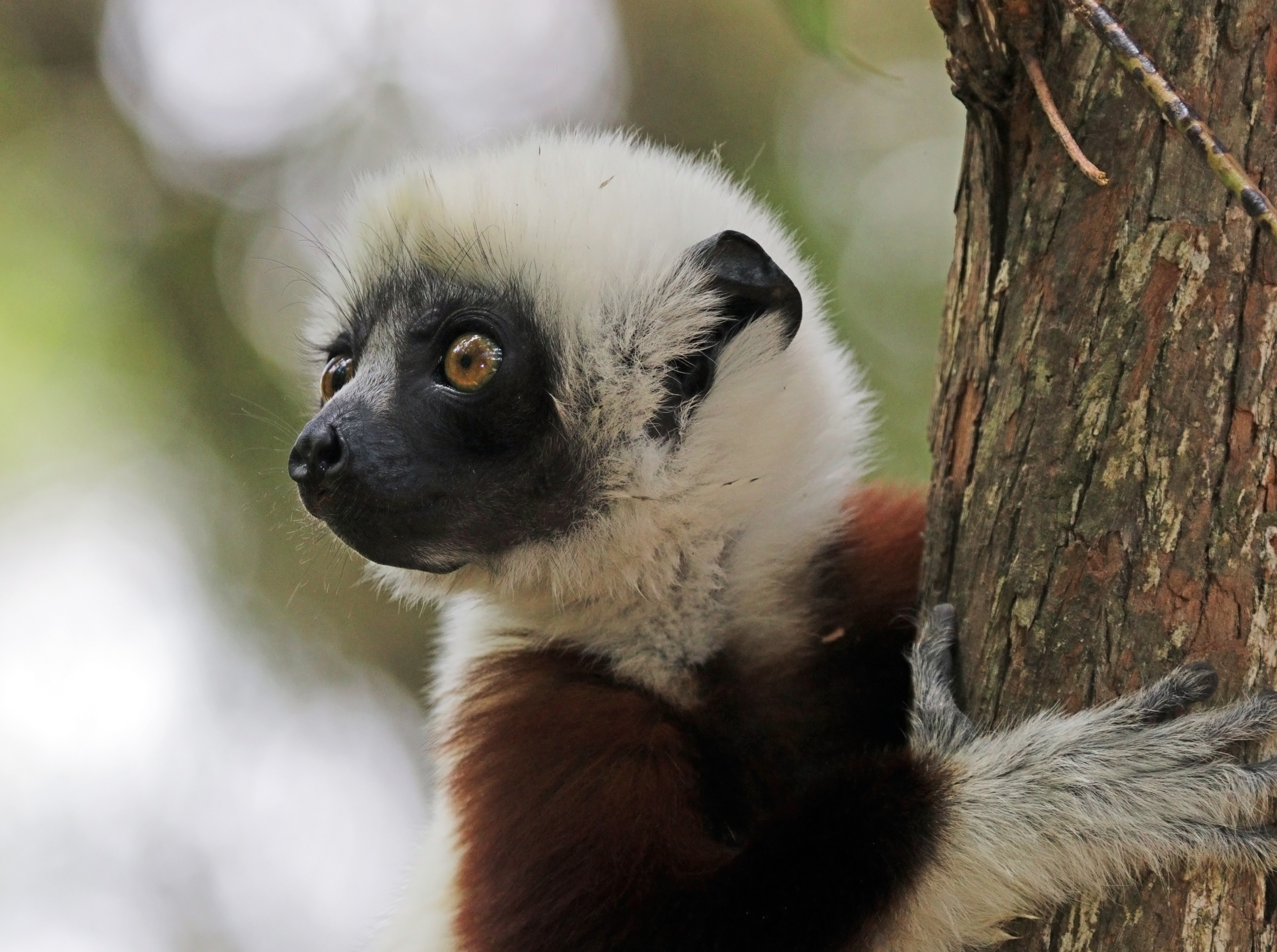

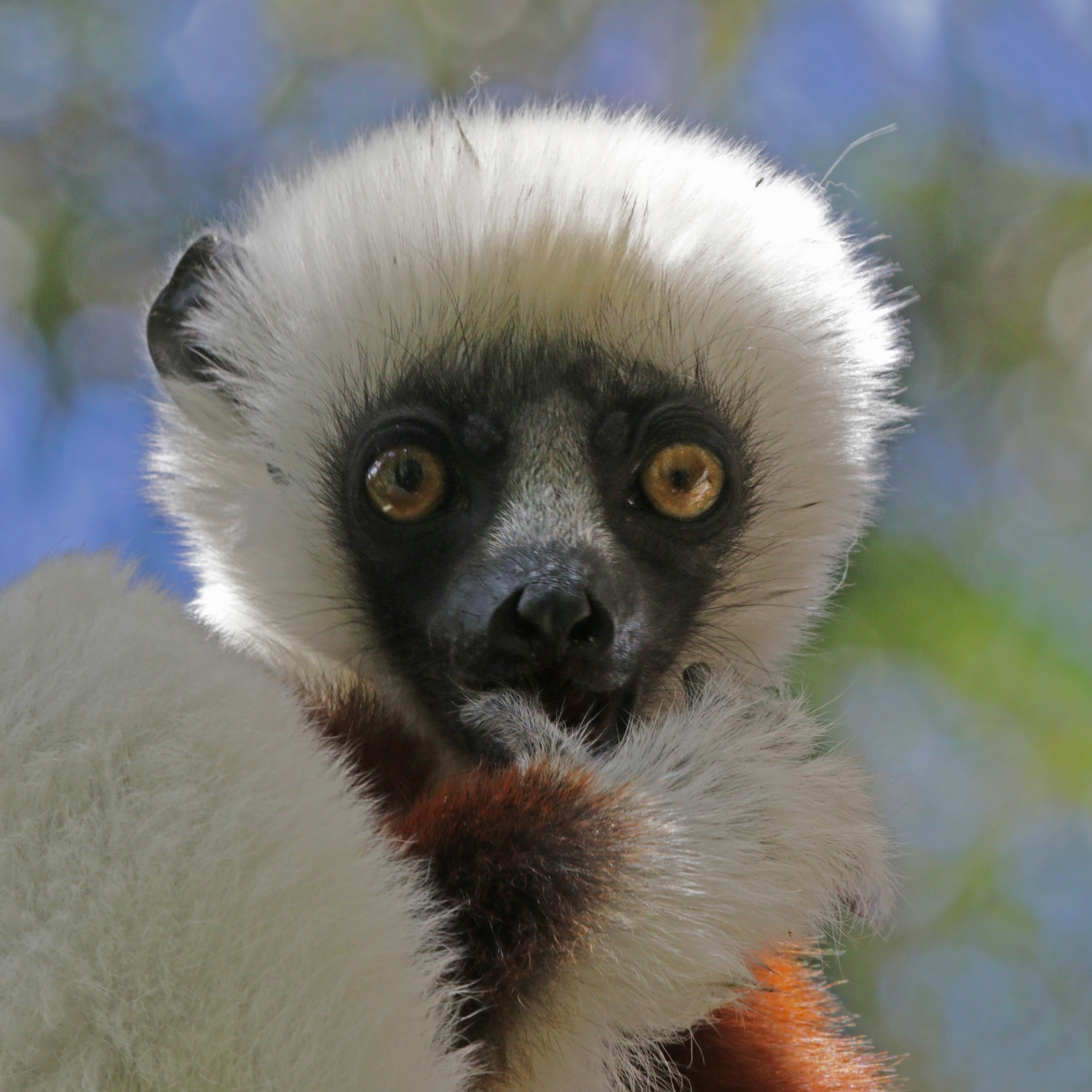
Juvenile

== Distribution ==
This species lives at altitudes less than 300 ft (91 m) in the dry deciduous forests of northwestern Madagascar, including coastal forests. It is found from the Betsiboka River up to the Maevarano River, and in large area between these rivers. Extensive surveys of the species' distribution conducted in 2009, 2010, and 2011 led to the confirmation of its presence in most forest fragments between these rivers. Nevertheless, its eastern distribution limits are unclear. Between the Sofia and Bemarivo Rivers, the species has twice been reported to be absent (Table 1). Similarly, the southern part of the inter-river system between the Bemarivo and Betsiboka Rivers, where little is known about the presence of the species, requires surveys.

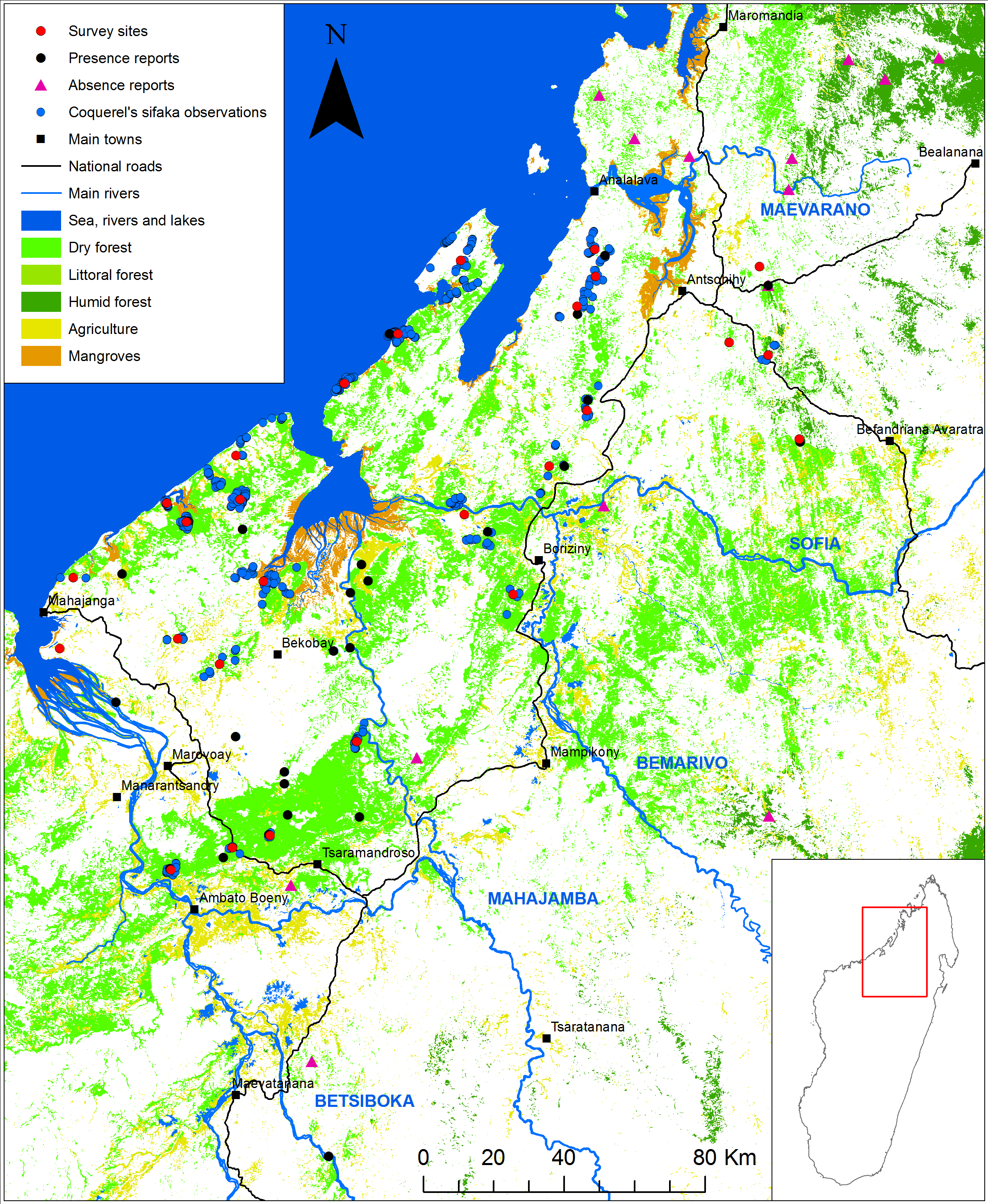
Map of P. coquereli distribution

Groups of this species have a home range area amounting to 4–9 ha (9.9–22.2 acres). A 2014 work in Ankarafantsika National Park suggests that population densities range from 5 to 100/km^{2} (13 to 259/sq mi) and significant (negative) effects of road and forest edge and/or a (positive) effect of river proximity on densities. The population size may be ~47,000 individuals in the Ankarafantsika National Park. However, the species is frequently seen around villages and in areas dominated by introduced tree species.

== Diet ==
This species' herbivorous diet varies by season. In the wet season, it eats immature leaves, flowers, fruit, bark, and dead wood. In the dry season, it eats mature leaves and buds. It may browse nearly 100 plant species, but the majority of its feeding time is concentrated on about 10% of these. Since it has a very fibrous diet, Coquerel's sifaka has an enlarged cecum and extremely long colon that helps facilitate digestion. These lemurs spend 30-40% of their day foraging, especially in the morning, midday, and evening. Females often lead during foraging and exert their dominance by eating the preferred food or denying the males food until they are satisfied. These lemurs are beneficial to the environment because they aid seed dispersion. Captive Coquerel's sifakas eat shining leaf sumac and mimosa.

== Behaviour ==
Coquerel's sifaka lives in matriarchal groups of about three to ten individuals.

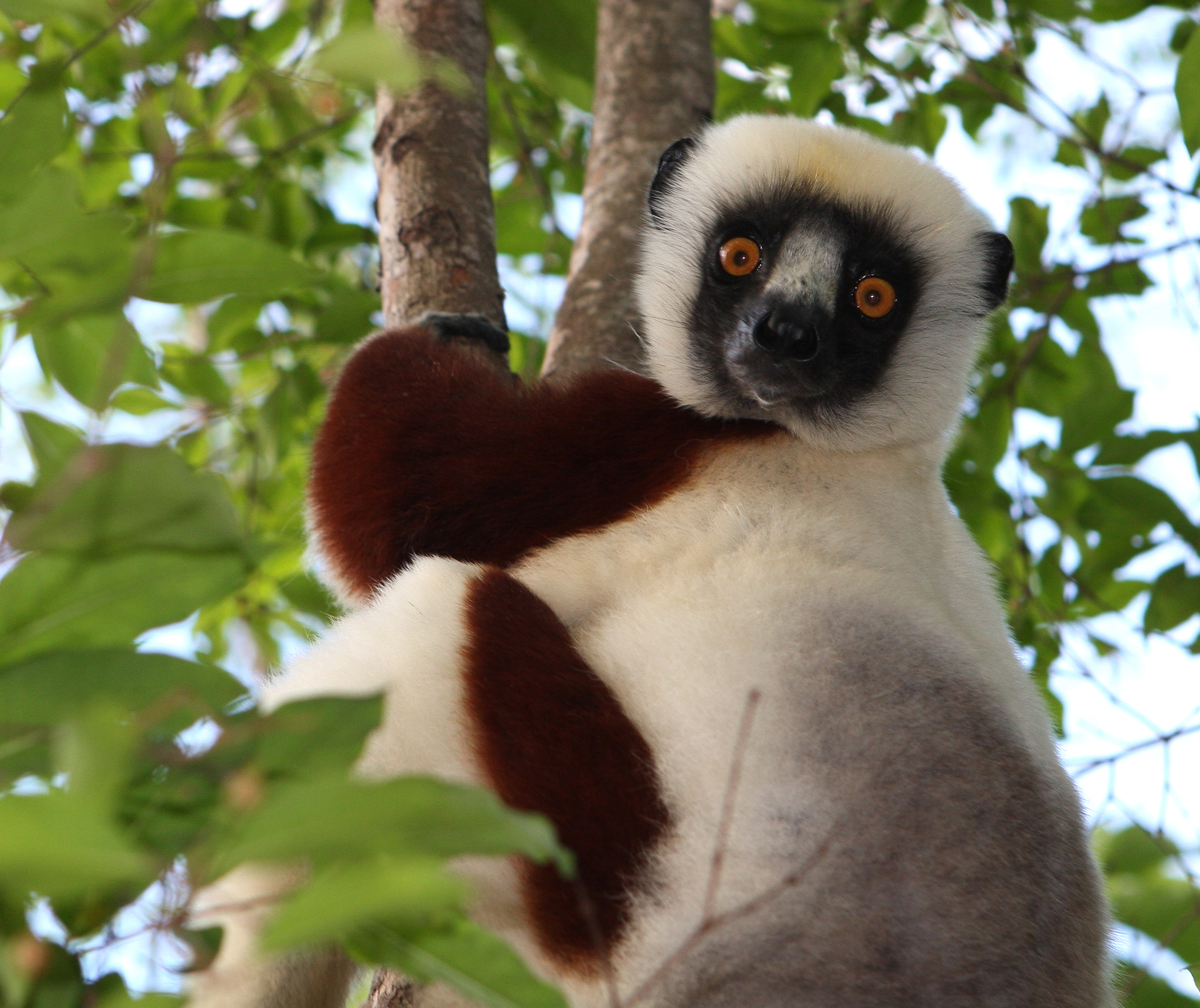
Clinging to tree trunk

It is diurnal and primarily arboreal. Much is known about its behavior from observations in the wild and in captivity.

=== Social structure ===
Coquerel's sifakas spend the majority of their time in areas of just 2–3 ha (4.9–7.4 acres). However, they can live in areas with 4–8 ha (9.9–19.8 acres). Though their home range may overlap with other groups of sifakas, they avoid each other to avoid aggression. When friendly Coquerel's sifakas meet, they greet by rubbing their noses together.

Matriarchy is rare in the animal kingdom as a whole, but common among lemurs. A matriarchal system is particularly pronounced in Coquerel's sifaka. All adult and even most subadult females are dominant over males.

Females have preferential access to food and other resources. When a female is browsing an area or tree, a male waits for her to finish before he moves there to feed. If he gets in the way of the female, she may lunge, smack, or bite him. The male then exhibits submissive behavior by rolling his tail between his legs, chattering softly, and baring his teeth in a grimace before quickly leaping out of her way.

When mating, Coquerel's sifaka commonly practices polyandry. A female may choose to mate with only one male, but most often she mates with several, from other visiting groups, as well as from her own. Males compete for access to sexually receptive females. However, the winner of a fight will not necessarily be the one she selects for breeding. The criteria by which she chooses a mate are evidently more complex.

In some other animals, polyandrous mating is thought to raise the chances of successful fertilization, but this does not appear to be the case in Coquerel's sifaka. Instead, polyandry is thought to be advantageous because when paternity is confused, the likelihood of male infanticide decreases.

=== Reproduction ===
Female Coquerel's sifakas choose their mate(s). They have synchronized estrus in January and February. Infants are born in June and July after a gestation period around 162 days. Normally, one infant is born during Madagascar's dry season (June–July). Newborn lemurs have an average weight of 100 g (3.5 oz), though it can vary between 85 and 115 g (3.0 and 4.1 oz). An infant clings to its mother's chest until about a month or so after birth, then transfers to her back.

Infants are weaned and become fully independent around six months of age. Adult size is reached at one to five years.

Males and females become sexually mature around two- to three-and-a-half years old, though some do not have their first offspring until they are six. Hybrids have been known to occur with some species. One is P. verreauxi.

=== Locomotion ===
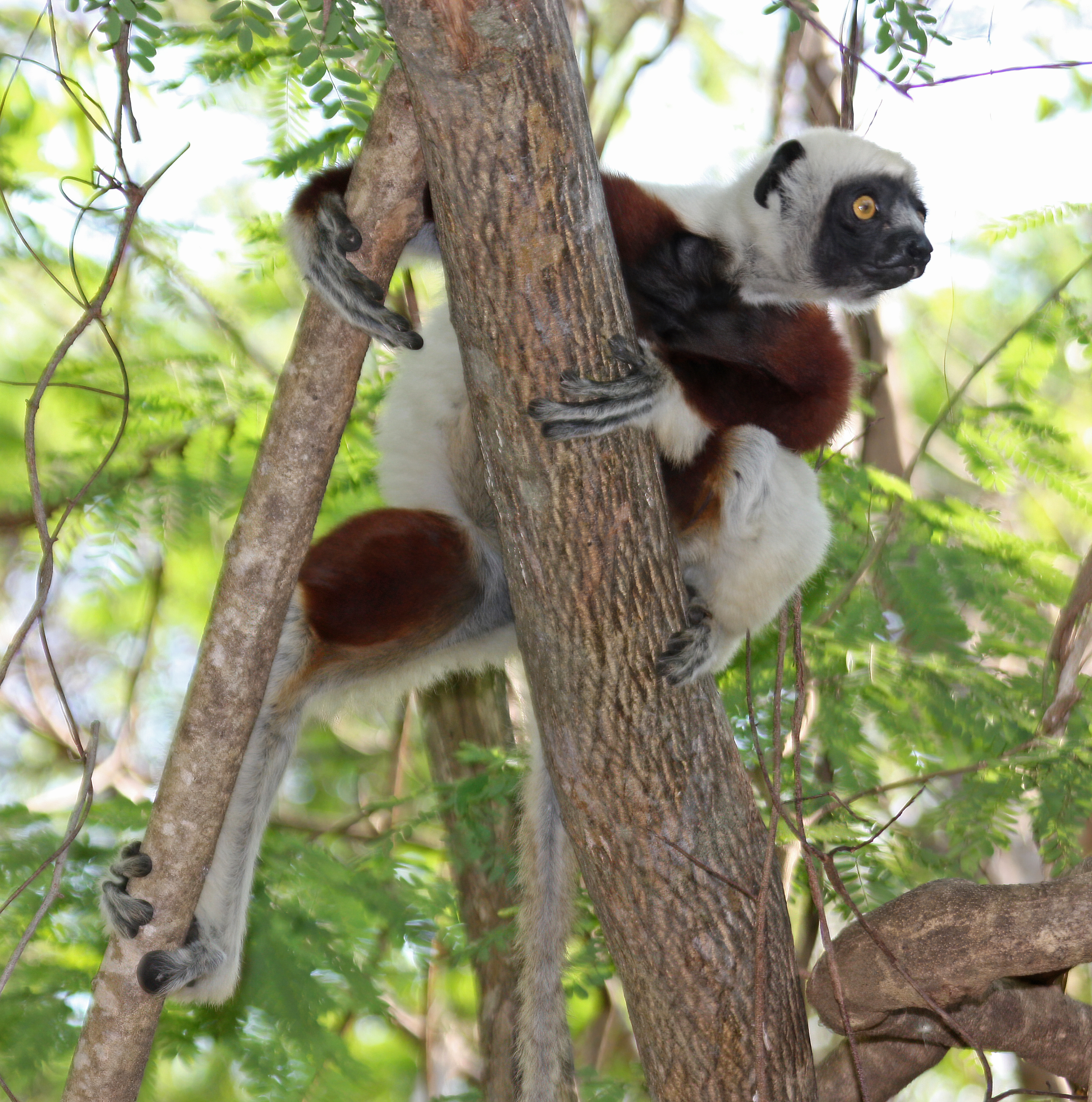
Coquerel's sifaka in the wild at Anjajavy Forest

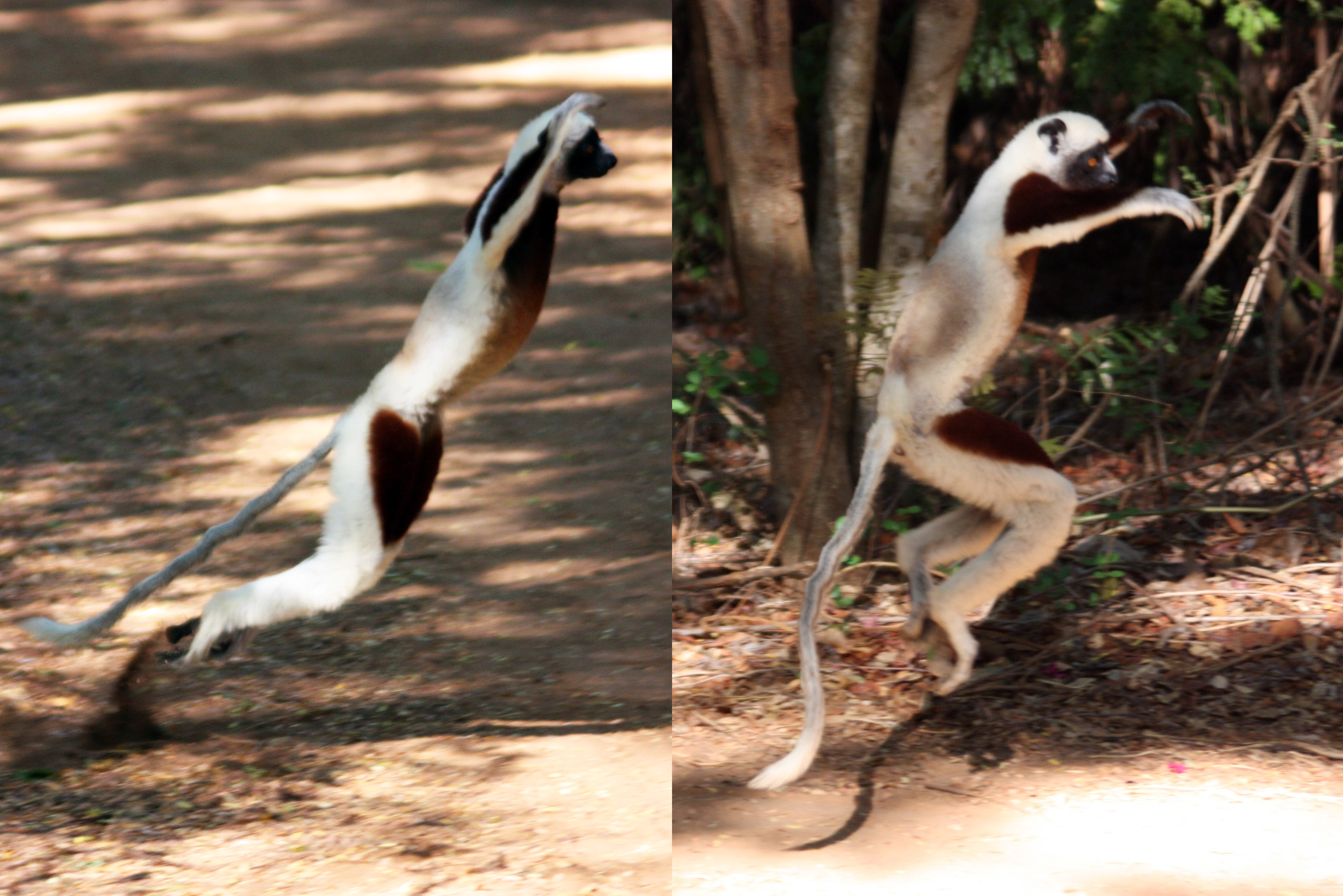
The terrestrial locomotion of Coquerel's sifaka

In the trees, Coquerel's sifaka moves by vertical clinging and leaping. It maintains an upright posture when at rest or when propelling itself between branches or trunks. This style of arboreal locomotion is characteristic of most, if not all, lemurs. This particular lemur can leap from tree to tree up to 35 feet (11 m). It has the extraordinary ability to leap to spiny trees and precisely place its hands and feet so that it will not hurt itself.

Occasionally, Coquerel's sifaka descends to the ground to cross open spaces. Its terrestrial locomotion is unique to its species. Like Verreaux's sifaka, it moves in a series of bipedal hops with its arms thrown out to the sides for balance. However, whereas Verreaux's sifaka bounds sideways and crosses its legs one in front of the other, the Coquerel's sifaka bounds forward, like a kangaroo. It leans in the direction of its jump to achieve forward momentum.

A study at Duke University's Primate Center examined feeding behaviors of captive sifakas to determine their handedness. Given chopped fruits and vegetables, adult male and female sifakas showed a predominant preference for left-handedness, while younger sifakas alternated hands to grab food. Coquerel's sifakas gain dexterity and hand preference with age, diverging only slightly by gender.

=== Communication ===
Coquerel's sifaka uses a variety of auditory, visual, and olfactory signals to communicate. "Sifaka" is a Malagasy name that comes from the lemurs' characteristic "shif-auk" sound. The first syllable is a low growl that "bubbles" in the throat, and the second is a clicking sound like an amplified hiccup. The "shih-fak" call is used to warn fellow group members of a potential ground predator or to threaten enemies and intruders. Coquerel's sifaka is highly territorial.

Contact calls used when groups are traveling include soft grunts and growls. If a sifaka is separated from its group members, it may emit a long, loud wail to find them.

One visual signal which Coquerel's sifaka uses to communicate is a rapid backward jerking of the head. This is a threatening action that may accompany the "shih-fak" call.

Sifakas also rely heavily on scent for communication. Males typically scent-mark using a gland in their throats, which they will rub back and forth along branches. Females are more likely to scent-mark with anogenital glands. It is not entirely clear what information is conveyed in these scents beyond the demarcation of territory.

A study of sifaka vocalizations found that roaring barks are associated with anti-raptor responses, in which the Coquerel's sifakas looked up and climbed down. The "tchi-fak" vocalizations was associated with anti-terrestrial responses, in which the sifakas looked down and climbed up. The meaning of growls seemed to vary by population, where a population subject to significant raptor predation associated the growls with anti-raptor responses, but another population associated growls with mild disturbance.

== Scientific importance ==
Coquerel's sifakas, like many lemurs, have been studied to help scientists learn about the evolutionary history of primates, including humans. They have been the subject of those researching evolution of color vision, paternal care, matriarchal primate societies, and causes of speciation.

== Conservation status and threats ==
Coquerel's sifaka is found in only two protected areas in Madagascar, the Ankarafantsika National Park and the Bora Special Reserve. It is a critically endangered species, according to the IUCN's Red List of Threatened Species, and it is listed in CITES Appendix I. The principal threats to its existence are deforestation, habitat fragmentation, and hunting pressure. The local people often clear trees to produce new farming land, especially in the marshes where rice can be grown. In northwestern Madagascar, deforestation results from annual burning to create new pastureland for livestock. Trees are also cut for the production of charcoal.

Many local Malagasy traditions prohibit hunting of Coquerel's sifaka. One such taboo derives from a legend of a sifaka saving the life of a boy who has fallen out of a tree. The story goes like this:

A little boy heads into the forest to find some honey. He spots a hive in a high tree and he ascends it. As he is about to reach in to collect the honey, he is immediately attacked by bees. The surprise causes the boy to lose his grip on the tree branch, and he falls to what is almost certainly his death. As the boy plummets toward the earth, a large lemur suddenly appears, swoops in, and catches the boy, saving his life. Ever since that day, lemurs became sacred to the Malagasy and it is said that anyone who kills one shall have extreme misfortune.

These protective taboos are breaking down with cultural erosion and immigration.

This lemur is now hunted for bushmeat, but humans are not the only threat. The introduction of foreign species, especially cats and dogs, has hurt the Coquerel's sifaka. Projects for Animal Welfare encourages the neutering and spaying of the cats and dogs on the island to protect the native wildlife. Even the protected areas where the Coquerel's sifaka occurs offer it little protection. It is hunted even within Ankarafantsika, and the Bora Special Reserve has become seriously degraded.

=== Predation ===
Many animals prey on Coquerel's sifakas. Hawks and other raptors attack them from above, while constrictor snakes and the fossa threaten them from the ground. Introduced predators such as feral dogs, feral cats, mongooses and civets also prey on them. However, of all these creatures, humans are the biggest hazard. Though killing the lemurs was taboo, Coquerel's sifaka now see humans as a threat and may give out an alarm call to warn the others.

Some lemurs are unaware of the danger humans pose and will approach humans on the ground. To intimidate predators they do recognize, the lemurs announce the threat with a warning call, and stare at the threat, shaking their heads back and forth.

== Cultural references ==
The titular lemur on the PBS Kids television program Zoboomafoo is portrayed by a Coquerel's sifaka named Jovian. Jovian lived at the Duke Lemur Center, where the show was originally filmed until he died from kidney failure at the age of 20 on November 10, 2014. His son Charlemagne, known as "Charlie", lives at the center, with his family group of other Coquerel's sifakas.
