= Dragon tiger phoenix =

Chinese dish

- Traditional Chinese: 龍虎鳳
- Simplified Chinese: 龙虎凤
Transcriptions
Standard Mandarin
- Hanyu Pinyin: lóng hǔ fèng
- IPA: [lʊ̌ŋ xù fə̂ŋ]
Yue: Cantonese
- Jyutping: lung4 fu2 fung6
Southern Min
- Hokkien POJ: liông-hóo-hōng

Dragon tiger phoenix is a classic Cantonese cuisine dish found almost exclusively in regions such as Guangdong. This dish is rarely eaten in modern days.

== Etymology ==
The name of the dish comes from the use of three animals. The dragon is represented by snake, tiger is represented by cat (sometimes masked palm civet is substituted) and phoenix is represented by chicken.

== Types ==
There are a few varieties of the dish. One version is literally called the "dragon tiger phoenix big braise" (龍虎鳳大燴). Another is the chrysanthemum dragon tiger phoenix" (菊花龍虎鳳).

== See also ==
- Ye wei
