= List of captive-bred meat animals =

The following is a list of animals that are or may have been raised in captivity for consumption by people. For other animals commonly eaten by people, see Game (food).

Mammals
- Bovinae:
  - American bison
  - Water buffalo
  - Cattle
  - Domestic yak
- Camelidae:
  - Dromedary
  - Llama
- Canidae:
  - Dog
- Caprae (goats)
  - Domestic goat
- Cervidae (deer):
  - Elk
  - Fallow deer
  - Moose (rarely tamed)
  - Red deer
  - Reindeer
  - White-tailed deer
- Felidae:
  - Domestic cat
- Equidae:
  - Donkey
  - Horse
- Lagomorphs:
  - Rabbit
- Macropodidae:
  - Kangaroo
- Oves (sheep):
  - Domestic sheep
- Rodents:
  - Guinea pig
  - Rat
- Suidae (pigs):
  - Domestic pig
  - Wild boar

Non-mammals

- Amphibians
  - Frogs
- Birds:
  - Chicken
  - Domestic duck
  - Domestic goose
  - Domestic turkey
  - Domesticated quail
  - Domestic pigeon
  - Guineafowl
  - Ostrich
  - Emu
  - Peacocks
- Fish:
  - Barramundi
  - Carp
  - Catfish
  - Cod
  - Common seabream
  - Dentex
  - Flounder
  - Gilthead seabream
  - Halibut
  - Meagre
  - Milkfish
  - Rabbitfish
  - Salmon – 60% farm raised
  - Seabass
  - Sharpsnout seabream
  - Striped bass
  - Sturgeon
  - Tilapia
  - Trout
  - Turbot
  - Wuchang bream
- Insects:
  - Cricket
  - Grasshopper
  - Maguey worm
  - Mopane worm
  - Silkworm
- Crustaceans:
  - Crayfish
  - Crab
  - Lobster
  - Shrimp
  - Prawns
- Mollusks:
  - Oysters
  - Scallop
  - Mussels
  - Land snails
  - Abalone
- Reptiles:
  - Alligator
  - Crocodile
  - Turtles
  - Snakes
  - Iguanas

== See also ==
- Game (food)
- List of meat dishes
- Marine mammals as food
