= Duke Lemur Center =

Sanctuary for strepsirrhine primates

Coordinates: 35.9949°N 78.9604°W

- Interactive map of Duke Lemur Center
- Type: Center to promote research and understanding of prosimians
- Location: 3705 Erwin Road; Durham, NC 27705
- Created: 1966
- Website: lemur.duke.edu

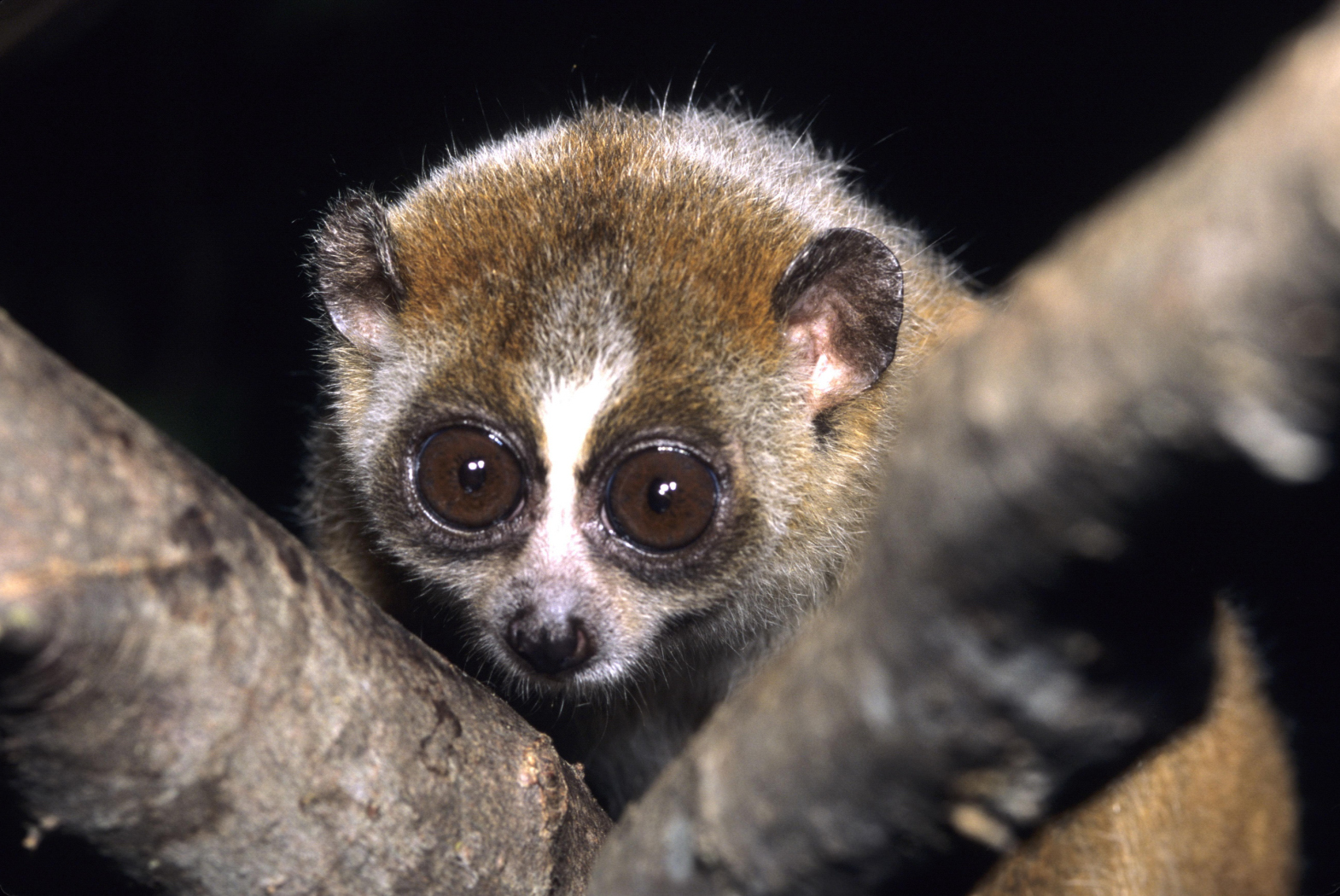
A pygmy slow loris at the Duke Lemur Center

The Duke Lemur Center is a non-invasive research center housing over 200 lemurs and bush babies across 13 species. It is located at Duke University in Durham, North Carolina. According to the Center, it houses the most diverse population of lemurs outside of their native Madagascar.

The center is open to the public through tours, for which visitors must make an appointment.

== History ==
In 1966, a prosimian colony of approximately 90 individuals, belonging to John Buettner-Janusch, was relocated from the Center for Prosimian Biology at Yale University to Duke University, creating the Duke Lemur Center (DLC). Through the 1970s, the colony grew to approximately 700 individuals representing 33 species. The current colony ranges between 200 and 250 animals, representing approximately 13 species. Originally called the Duke University Primate Center (DUPC), the center's name was changed in April 2006 after a refocusing of the scientific goals and overall mission. Specimens from its scientific collection may thus be assigned the code DPC.

The mission of the Duke University Lemur Center is to "promote research and understanding of prosimians and their natural habitat as a means of advancing the frontiers of knowledge, to contribute to the educational development of future leaders in international scholarship and conservation and to enhance the human condition by stimulating intellectual growth and sustaining global biodiversity."

According to Duke University, the Lemur Center, the only university-based facility in the world devoted to the study of strepsirrhine primates, "is home to the world's largest colony of endangered primates – including more than 200 lemurs, bush babies and lorises.... More than 85 percent of the center's inhabitants were born on site."

In 1997, the center began a program to reintroduce black-and-white ruffed lemurs into the 5,500-acre (2,200 ha) Betampona Natural Reserve in Madagascar, the first return of any prosimian primates to the island nation.

In 2009 and 2010, the center completed two new buildings for housing lemurs. The first building was completed in 2009 and is a 14,922-square-foot (1,386.3 m^{2}) facility (including exterior animal runs) with 7,056 square feet (655.5 m^{2}) of interior space. It can house up to 60 animals that can be released into the 69-acre (28 ha) Duke Forest if weather permits. The second building was completed in 2010 and is a 20,637-square-foot (1,917.2 m^{2}) facility (including exterior animal runs) with 9,883 square feet (918.2 m^{2}) of interior space. Together, they are able to house 140 lemurs. The buildings are designed with animal housing wings radiating from a central core which houses common resources like laboratories, exam rooms, food prep, bathrooms, and storage spaces. Both buildings are designed for low water and electricity use, and are LEED registered. The total cost of the two-buildings, designed by architects Lord, Aeck & Sargent of Chapel Hill, North Carolina, was $10.4 million.

== Zoboomafoo ==
The children's television show Zoboomafoo, produced by the Public Broadcasting Service (PBS), was filmed at the Duke Lemur Center. In order to film the show, a custom-made animal sound stage was constructed on the Duke University campus. One of the show's hosts Martin Kratt, holds a degree in Zoology from Duke University.

On November 10, 2014, Jovian the Coquerel's sifaka – who portrayed Zoboomafoo (in the series of the same name) – died of renal failure in his home (at the Duke Lemur Center) at the age of 20.

== See also ==
- Lemur
- Strepsirrhini
- Primate
- Lorisoidea
- Madagascar
- Wildlife conservation
- Conservation biology
- Endangered species
- Betampona Reserve
- Zoboomafoo
