= Fitoaty =

The fitoaty is a morphologically distinct feral cat that exists in the rainforests of northeastern Madagascar. Due to its reclusive habits it is poorly studied.

== History ==
Madagascar has no native felids; instead, all native Malagasy carnivorans belong to the family Eupleridae. The Fitoaty is believed to have originated from escaped populations of the domestic cat brought to the island by European colonizers in the 17th century. The fitoaty, along with other populations of feral cats, thus represents an invasive species on Madagascar.

Residents of northeastern Madagascar are familiar with the fitoaty, with reports dating back to at least the 1980s. It first attracted the attention of the scientific community after a 2011 sighting and subsequent 2013 paper; initially, it was unknown whether the animal represented a feral cat or an unknown euplerid species. Photos captured via trail cameras were first published in 2015, confirming its identity as a felid.

== Biology ==
The fitoaty is believed to be feral form of the domestic cat (Felis catus), although no genetic analyses have been published on its relationships as of 2026. It is a relatively large, all-black cat with pale eyes; its limbs are long and its hind limbs muscular, and its head is proportionally smaller than typical cats. In morphology and habitat, the fitoaty differs from the (also feral) Malagasy forest cat, which is shorter-limbed and tabby in coloration.

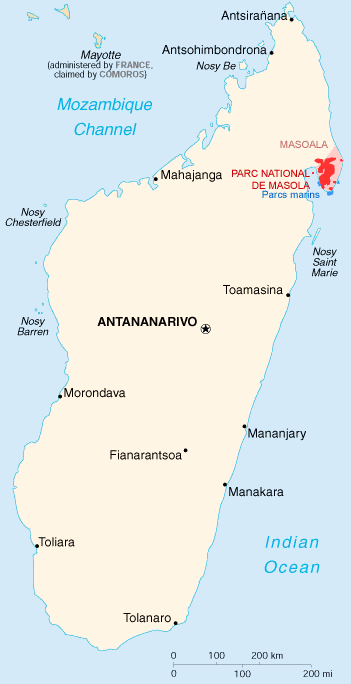
Location of Masoala National Park, where the fitoaty was first reported.

Photographic and anecdotal evidence concur that the fitoaty primarily inhabits intact rainforest and, more infrequently, recently-degraded forest. It is not common at forest edges or near villages, unlike more typical feral cats of the region with which it does not commonly co-occur.

The fitoaty is known to eat endemic Malagasy rodents and is presumed to hunt them, but neither its hunting habits nor its impact on native rodent populations are known. They are also reported to hunt domestic chickens, Malagasy turtle dove, and Malagasy coucal.

Fitoaty are reported to create nests in tree holes in which they raise their young.

== Human interactions ==
A survey of villagers in the Masoala Peninsula reported that 94% of residents were familiar with the fitoaty and that 22% had personally seen it.

The name fitoaty literally translates to "seven livers", and stems from a man who caught a fitoaty in a snare and reportedly discovered seven livers inside; the name has stuck despite trappers not believing that the animal actually has seven livers. Regardless, fitoaty are not intentionally hunted. Despite consumption of carnivorans and of feral cats in general being high in the region, fitoaty are not generally eaten, either due to taboos or because their meat is believed to be unsafe to consume. Fitoaty are also said to able to outsmart traps set for other carnivorans. It is sometimes also referred to as the "black fossa".

Due to concerns of negative impacts on endangered Malagasy rodents and lemurs, researchers have suggested euthanisation of fitoaty may be necessary.

== See also ==
- Malagasy forest cat
- List of invasive species in Madagascar
