= Jovian (lemur) =

Coquerel's sifaka who portrayed Zoboo in Zoboomafoo

- Species: Coquerel's sifaka (Propithecus coquereli)
- Sex: Male
- Born: Jovian Marcus Kendall; April 10, 1994; Duke Lemur Center, Durham, North Carolina, U.S.
- Died: November 10, 2014 (aged 20); Duke Lemur Center, Durham, North Carolina, U.S.
- Cause of death: Kidney failure
- Occupation: Actor
- Notable role: Zoboo in Zoboomafoo
- Years active: 1999–2001
- Parents: Nigel; Flavia
- Offspring: Ferdinand; Gertrude; Maria; Matilda; Gisela; Marius; Wilhelmina; Rufus; Adelaide; Conrad; Geta; Charlemagne; Edward

Jovian (April 10, 1994 – November 10, 2014) was a Coquerel's sifaka lemur, best known for portraying the title character in the children's television series Zoboomafoo.

== Biography ==
Jovian was born on April 10, 1994, at the Duke Lemur Center in Durham, North Carolina, to parents Nigel and Flavia.

When Martin Kratt and his younger brother Chris wanted a lemur co-host for their TV show Zoboomafoo, Martin returned to the Duke Lemur Center, where he had previously volunteered while a student at Duke University. In 1997, the Kratts prepared for the show by filming Jovian and his parents jumping around an outdoor cage modeled on the stage set. Jovian appeared on the program from January 1999 to November 2001. Jovian would appear mostly in the opening segments, before transforming into a talking lemur puppet after eating his meals.

After appearing on the show, Jovian was credited with attracting 15,000 visitors to the Duke Lemur Center each year. As part of the center's conservation breeding program, Jovian was paired with a lemur named Pia. Throughout his life, Jovian sired 13 offspring with two different breeding partners.

On November 10, 2014, Jovian died of kidney failure at the Duke Lemur Center at the age of 20. News of his death spread quickly worldwide, with an outpouring of grief from the public and media industry. The first relative of Jovian to be born after his death was his granddaughter Isabella, born on January 25, 2015. Since then, his children have produced multiple children. Jovian's granddaughter, Cassia, was born to Gisela on January 25, 2021.

== Filmography ==
- Zoboomafoo — 1999
