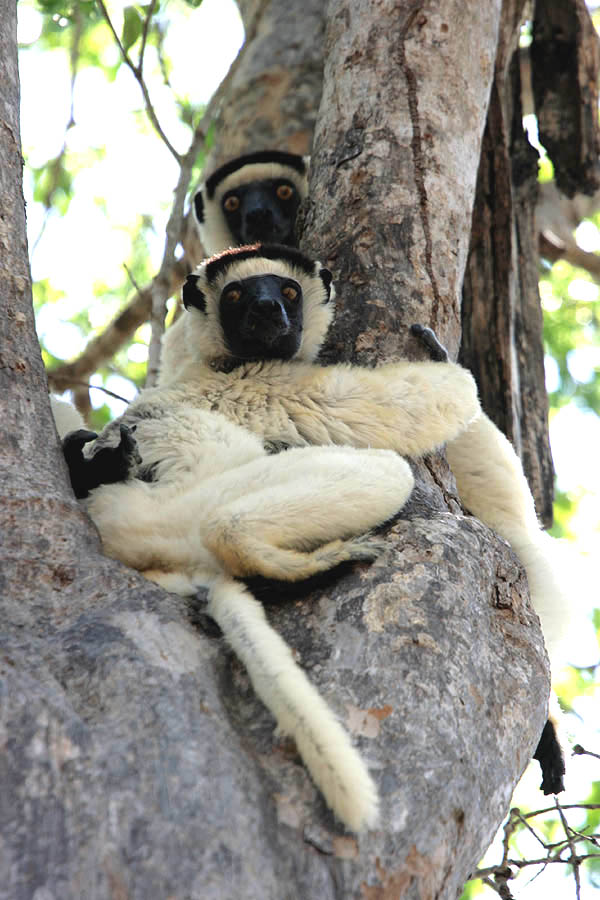

Conservation status
- Critically Endangered (IUCN 3.1)
- CITES Appendix I

Scientific classification
- Kingdom: Animalia
- Phylum: Chordata
- Class: Mammalia
- Order: Primates
- Suborder: Strepsirrhini
- Family: Indriidae
- Genus: Propithecus
- Species: P. verreauxi

Binomial name
- Propithecus verreauxi A. Grandidier, 1867
- Distribution of P. verreauxi

Synonyms
- majori Rothschild, 1894; verreauxoides Lamberton, 1936

= Verreaux's sifaka =

Verreaux's sifaka Temporal range: Pleistocene - recent

Species of lemur

Verreaux's sifaka (Propithecus verreauxi), or the white sifaka, is a medium-sized primate in one of the lemur families, the Indriidae. Critically Endangered, it lives in Madagascar and can be found in a variety of habitats from rainforest to dry deciduous forests of western Madagascar and the spiny thickets of the south. Its fur is thick and silky and generally white with brown on the sides, top of the head, and on the arms; its ventral area is relatively glabrous. Its body is adapted to an arboreal existence in which the major form of locomotion is vertical leaping; on the ground its only means of locomotion is a "dancing" form of hopping. The species lives in smallish groups (~2-13 animals) and is primarily folivorous.

== Anatomy ==
In adulthood, the full head and body length is between 42.5 and 45 cm (16.7 and 17.7 in). The tail of a fully grown Verreaux's sifaka grows to be between 56 and 60 cm (22 and 24 in) long. In weight, adult females reach 3.4 kg (7.5 lb) on average, and adult males 3.6 kg (7.9 lb).

Verreaux's sifaka has a relatively low, flat braincase. The face is broader than that of most other indriids, but its snout is reduced. This species of sifaka is also distinguished by its unique dentition. Its dental formula is 2.1.2.32.0.2.3. The upper incisors are very small and are slightly angled inward towards the gap between I^{1} and I^{2}. In the mandible, Verreaux's sifaka displays the strepsirhine characteristic: the toothcomb. Formed by the procumbent lower incisor and canine, the toothcomb projects past the front margin of the mouth. P. verreauxi also presents the high, shearing molar crests of a folivore, helping to shred the leaves, fruit and flowers that it eats.

Postcranially, Verreaux's sifaka has a low intermembral index that ranges from 63–66. It has a broader ribcage than most other prosimians, and has many lumbar vertebrae lending it considerable flexibility. The pelvis is high and narrow and the acetabulum is relatively shallow, also allowing for greater flexibility. Like other indriids, P. verreauxi has a short calcaneus, pointed nails, and slightly webbed hands and feet.

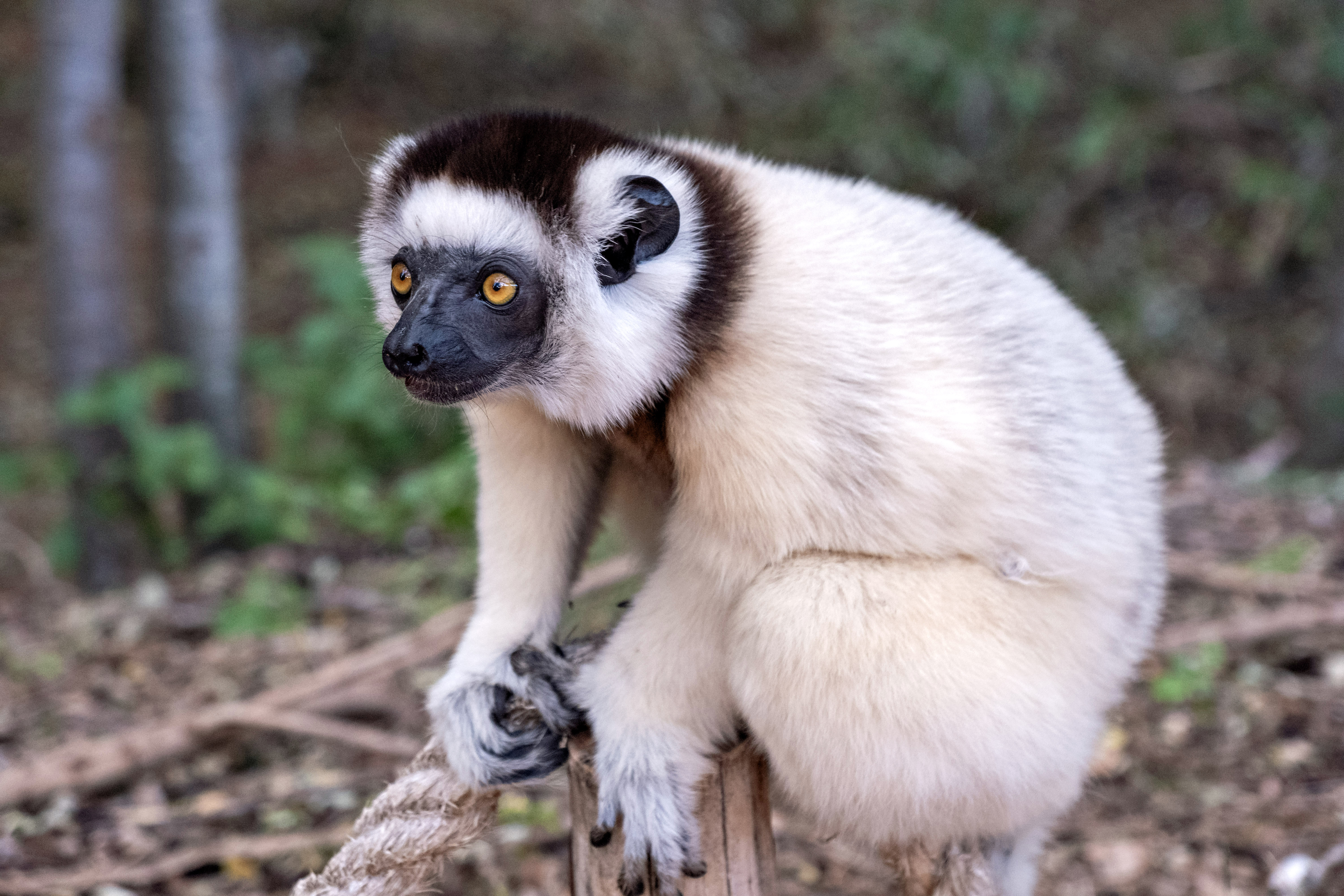
Adult Verreaux’s sifaka.

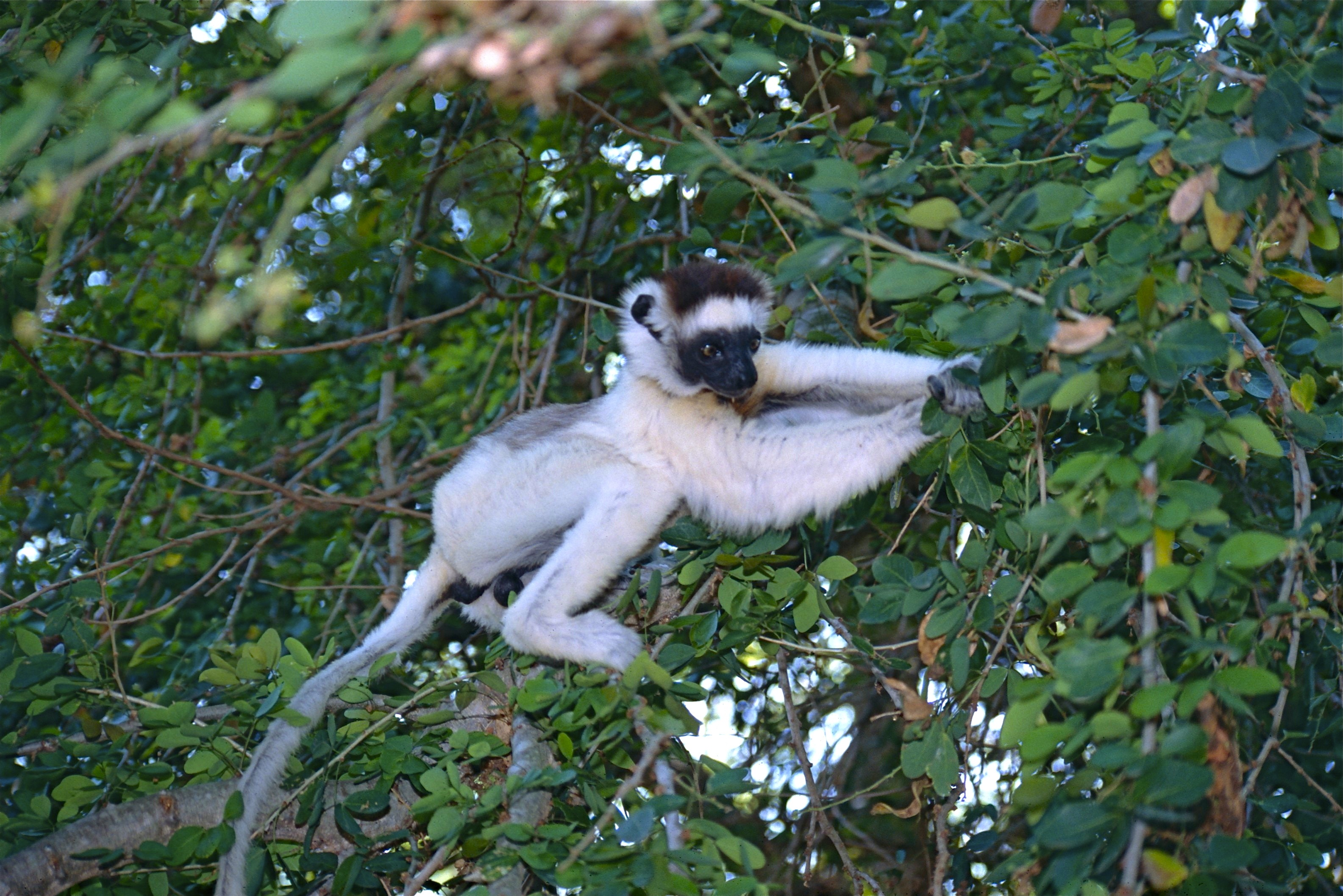
Juvenile Verreaux’s sifaka.

Typical movement

== Diet ==
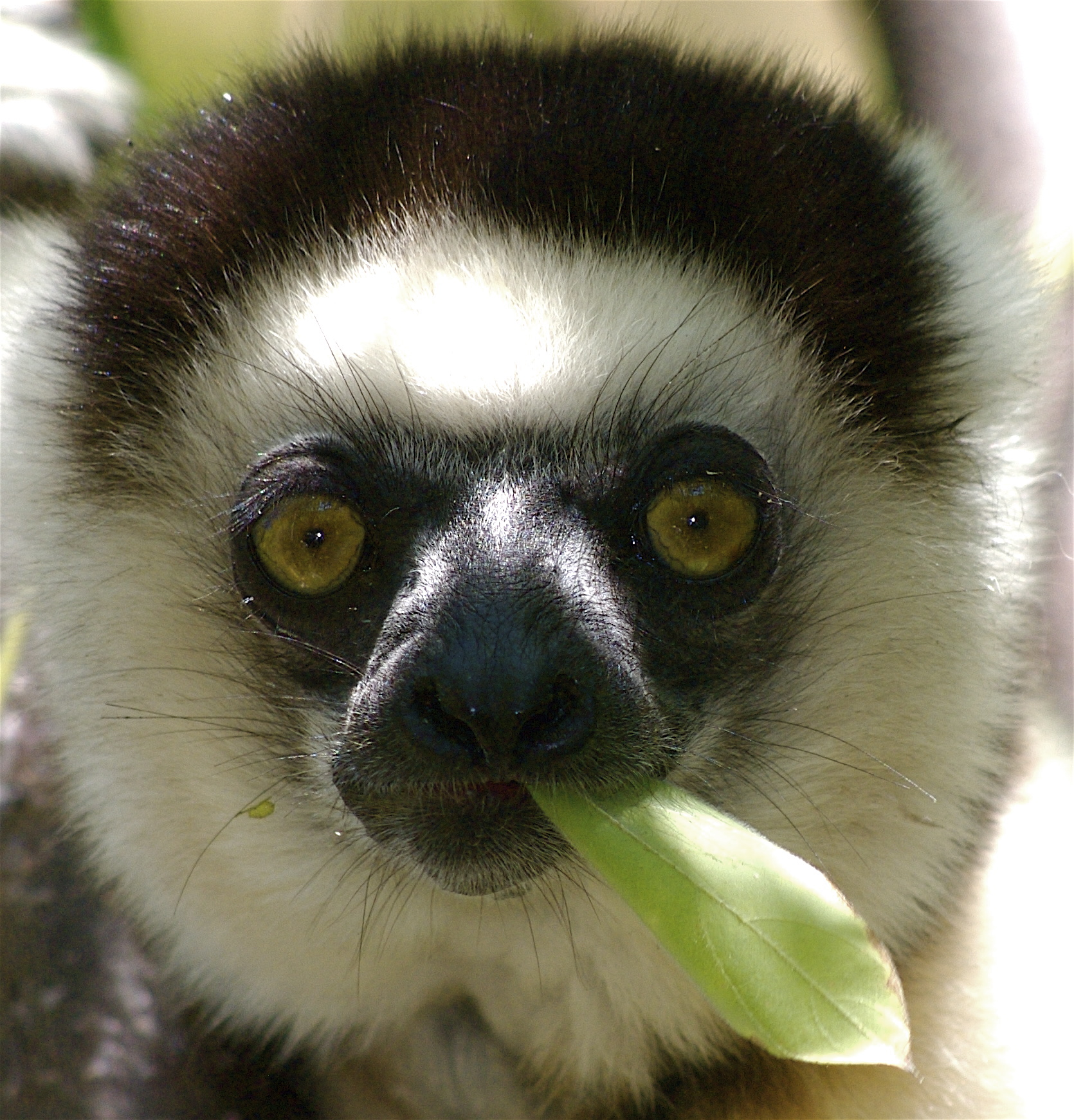
Verreaux's sifaka is mostly folivorous.

Verreaux's sifakas forage for food with their troop, primarily in the morning and late afternoon, so they can rest during the hottest part of the day. They are herbivores; leaves, fruit, bark and flowers are typical components of the diet. However, they are mostly folivorous (leaves represent the majority of the diet over the year, especially in the dry season) and they seem to choose food items based on quality (lower tannin content) rather than on availability.

== Behaviour ==
Verreaux's sifakas are diurnal and arboreal. They move through the trees by clinging and leaping between vertical supports. They are capable of making remarkable leaps through the trees – distances of 9–10 m (30–33 ft) are not uncommon. On the ground, they hop bipedally.

They live in groups of 2–12, which may consist of one male and female, or many males and females together. Group and population sex ratio can be more or less skewed toward males. Many groups seem to be effectively harem groups with a single dominant male unrelated with resident female(s). They have a home range of 2.8 to 5.0 ha, and although they are territorial, they defend food sources rather than territorial boundaries, as often boundaries overlap. Females are dominant over males, forming a matriarchal society.

Females use anogenital secretion mainly for territory demarcation whereas males seem to use specialized secretions (via anogenital and throat glands) more for sexual "advertisement" than for territorial purposes. Males show bimorphism, by showing either a clean or stained chest, derived from throat gland secretions and smeared on surfaces by rubbing the upper part of the chest. Stain-chested males engage in the most active marking, and chest staining seems to be related to testosterone levels.

Males and females were found to engage in a biological market, exchanging grooming for grooming during the non-mating period, and grooming ("offered" by males) for reproductive opportunities (sexual access "offered" by females) during the mating period. A study found that females copulate more with stained-chested than with clean-chested males. On the other hand, clean-chested males, with a lower scent-releasing potential, usually offer more grooming to females. This "grooming for sex" tactic allows males with a clean chest to get to copulate with females, even if at low rate.

It has also been discovered that sifaka dyads often engage in post-conflict reunions after aggressive episodes: reconciliation occurs more frequently when food is not involved and for low intensity aggressions. In this species play behavior persists into adulthood where it is used, especially by stranger males during the mating period, as an ice-breaking mechanism to reduce xenophobia.

A study of sifaka vocalizations found that roaring barks are associated with anti-raptor responses in which the Verreaux sifakas looked up and climbed down. On the other hand, the meaning of "tchi-fak" vocalizations and growls varied by population, where a population subject to significant terrestrial predation associated these vocalizations with anti-terrestrial responses in which the sifakas looked down and climbed up, while another population associated the "tchi-fak" with a non-specific flight response, and the growl with mild disturbance.

== Reproduction ==
Around 45% of females breed each year when in oestrous between late January and early February. Females give birth to one infant after a gestation period of 130 days, between June and August. For the first 6–8 weeks, the infant clings to the mother's stomach, but for the following 19 weeks, it clings to her back. About 30% of infants are lost to predation by the fossa (Cryptoprocta ferox) and a smaller number to raptors like the Madagascar harrier-hawk (Polyboroides radiatus). Those that do survive reach sexual maturity between 3–5 years.

Males generally leave the group to join a neighboring group while adult females tend to stay with their natal group. The testicles of those who become dominant increase when other males are around, increasing their chances of reproducing.

== Ecology and conservation status ==
The species is listed in CITES Appendix I, and its IUCN conservation status was updated to Critically Endangered in 2020. In the small spiny forest fragments of South Madagascar, sifaka abundance appears to be influenced by the proportion of large trees (diameter at breast height >=5 cm) and by the abundance of the plant species Allouadia procera, a key species of the spiny forest habitat. A long-term, large-scale demographic study of the species at Baza Mahafaly Special Reserve in southwest Madagascar found that the sifaka population there had a population growth rate of 0.98 (with confidence intervals spanning 1), suggesting that the population was not in danger of imminent extinction. However, both severe droughts and an increased annual variation in rainfall levels can depress the population growth rate.. Despite shrinking habitats, P. verreauxi still likely has the largest distribution of all sifakas. An additional threat to the species is predation by invasive feral forest cats, which are known to predate upon both juveniles and adults.
