= Coconuts Media =

Media company

Coconuts Tabloid Media
- Type: Private
- Industry: Media
- Founded: September 15, 2011; 15 years ago in Bangkok, Thailand
- Founders: Byron Perry
- Defunct: December 19, 2023
- Headquarters: Hong Kong
- Number of locations: Bali, Bangkok, Hong Kong, Jakarta, Kuala Lumpur, Manila, Singapore, Yangon
- Website: coconuts.co

Coconuts Tabloid Media was a multi-national media company across Hong Kong that published a network of local city websites and documentary videos online. The company served ten cities and countries across South East Asia, namely Bangkok, Manila, Hong Kong, Singapore, Kuala Lumpur, Jakarta, Bali and Yangon, covering local news and cultural trends. Coconuts Media used social media and video platforms to increase its reach. In addition to English, the company produces content in Thai and Indonesian.

Coconuts Media employed around 40 staff members as of August 2016, half of whom are in editorial. In 2015, it had a reported total monthly reach of 14.6 million unique readers across all platforms.

== History ==
=== Beginnings and growth (2011) ===
Coconuts Media was inspired by US-based blogs such as the Gothamist network and New York's Gawker, as well as BuzzFeed and Vice. The company was founded by American journalist and entrepreneur Byron Perry, out of his Bangkok apartment on September 19, 2011, with Perry reportedly self-publishing nearly all the articles himself in the first months.

Perry started his career in journalism as an Editorial Fellow for San Francisco Magazine before moving on to a copy editor position at the Hollywood trade magazine Variety in Los Angeles. At Variety, he covered movie premieres; wrote columns on actor castings and talent agency signings; and attended the 2008 Academy Awards as part of Variety's coverage team. After a brief stint as a Siam Reap reporter for The Phnom Penh Post, Perry moved to Thailand to work for Ensign Media as Executive Editor for the real estate trade magazine Property Report and yachting magazine Helm. After a year and a half at Ensign Media, Perry launched Coconuts Media in 2011.

Coconuts Media launched its first international branch in Manila in November 2012, ahead of further expansion into Singapore in August 2013. One month later, it launched a regional office in Hong Kong.

=== ABS-CBN News partnership (2015) ===
In March 2015, Coconuts Media signed a two-year content partnership with ABS-CBN, allowing both parties to exchange news, features and video content on their respective platforms. ABS-CBN said it hoped the deal will help them gain more granular coverage, especially in Southeast Asia, while Coconuts Media said it wanted to expand its coverage of hard news and sports.

=== Recognition ===
Coconuts Media received an Honorable Mention in the 2015 SOPA Awards for Excellence for "Hidden in Plain Sight", a look at the legions of street children in Bangkok.

In 2016, Coconuts Hong Kong Managing Editor Laurel Chor won a SOPA for Excellence in Feature Photography in Category B for a profile of Mui Thomas, a young Hong Kong woman with harlequin ichthyosis, a very rare and debilitating skin disease.

Coconuts Media acquired the Bangkok print and online lifestyle magazine BK Magazine in 2021.

=== Closure (2023) ===
On December 19, 2023, Coconuts Media chairman Byron Perry announced the closure of Coconuts Tabloid Media. Perry attributed the closure to the difficulty of financial sustainability and regional journalistic challenges. Despite the closure of its namesake outlet, holding company Coconuts Media continues to operate its other subsidiaries, including BK Magazine, Soimilk, and Grove.

== Coconuts TV ==
Coconuts Media produced in-house and freelance videos as Coconuts TV. Aside from short reports and original documentaries, Coconuts TV produced news, food, and travel reports, aimed at international audiences.

== Funding and revenue ==
A year after the launch of Coconuts Bangkok in 2011, the company reportedly raised a small and undisclosed round of Angel funding from private investors in Silicon Valley. They would later go on to report a second round in 2013 after the launch of Coconuts Manila, before scoring a more substantial $2 million round in 2014.

The main sources of revenue for Coconuts Media are reported to be traditional online banner ads, sponsored content and video content, with some footage having been sold to unnamed European TV channels.

From 2015 to 2016, Coconuts Media produced a sponsored content package for Thailand's Singha beer, for which Coconuts TV produced a 12-episode video series on its food channel. Coconuts Media also uses pre-roll ads for onsite videos.

Coconuts media reportedly made almost $500,000 in revenue in 2015, with projected revenues in excess of $1 Million for the year of 2016.
