= Malagasy forest cat =

The Malagasy forest cat, also referred to as the ampaha, piso an'ala, piso dia, saka kary, and kary, is a feral cat living in the forests of Madagascar. Malagasy forest cats are distinct in morphology and behavior from domestic "village cats" as well as from the also-feral fitoaty. Genetic evidence suggests that they are descended from domestic cats brought to the island from Arabia by Muslim settlers in the 9th century CE.

== Etymology ==
The Malagasy forest cat is known by a variety of names across Madagascar. The Betsileo, Sakalava, and Mahafaly refer to it as ampaha, translating to "cat run wild". In the Merina dialect, it is referred to as the kary or saka kary, both of which translate to "wild cat"; a more general Malagasy word is piso dia, also translating to "wild cat", or piso an'ala, translating to "cat of the forest".

== Biology ==
The Malagasy forest cat is a relatively large (4–5 kg) feral cat (Felis catus). Unlike free-ranging domestic cats in nearby villages, which exhibit a wide variety of coat colours, forest cats near-uniformly have a mackerel tabby colouration; white spotting is known but uncommon. Kittens have a more yellow coat. Its superficial resemblance to the African wildcat initially led to speculation that it may be a truly wild cat, but genetic analysis suggests that it is descended from Arabian domestic cats. It can be found in northern, central, and southern Madagascar.

The earliest historical evidence clearly distinguishing the forest cat from village cats dates to 1870; however, it is unclear when the two populations diverged. It is also unknown whether the forest cat interbreeds with village cats and/or the fitoaty.

Its relationship to the fitoaty is currently unknown, as the latter cat is poorly studied. The forest cat and the fitoaty may be found at the same localities, but have different occupancy patterns; camera trap evidence suggests that, in contrast to the fitoaty, Malagasy forest cats are more common near villages than in the deep forest. Additionally, and unlike the fitoaty, the ampaha is found throughout Madagascar, and is anecdotally said to be more common in the drier western regions of the island. Because evidence suggests that the two cats differ in morphology, behaviour, and range, Farris et al. (2014) suggest the possible presence of niche partitioning. Young are reared in dens in holes in trees.

The forest cat is considered an invasive species. Known prey of the Malagasy forest cat include Verreaux's Sifaka, a critically endangered species of lemur, as well as the Ring-tailed lemur and small birds and lizards. Malagasy forest cats are also known to scavenge lemurs of the genus Lepilemur. As forest cats may be more active in daytime when they are raising young, this may lead to increased encounters with sifakas; predation on lemurs is known to increase during the dry season. Forest cats are also known to prey on endemic rodent species. Forest cats are also believed to carry toxoplasmosis, a protozoal pathogen that poses a severe risk to some lemur species. It is also believed that competition with forest cats may negatively impact native euplerid carnivores.

== Interactions with humans ==
Malagasy forest cats are believed to be descended from domestic cats brought from the Arabian Sea region circa the 9th century. Unlike the fitoaty, the forest cat is commonly trapped for food by local residents.

== See also ==
- Fitoaty
