= List of fictional penguins =

This list of fictional penguins is subsidiary to the list of fictional birds and is a collection of various notable penguin characters that appear in various works of fiction. It is limited to well-referenced examples of penguins in literature, film, television, comics, animation, and video games.

== Literature ==
Character	Origin	Author	Notes
Captain Cook, Greta, other penguins	Mr. Popper's Penguins	Richard and Florence Atwater	Children's book about a housepainter who ends up with a flock of penguins.
Evil emperor penguin	Evil emperor penguin	Laura Ellen Anderson	Children's book series about an evil emperor penguin and his sidekicks.
Whiteblack	Whiteblack the Penguin Sees the World	H. A. Rey and Margret Rey	Children's book about a travelling penguin
Roy and Silo	And Tango Makes Three	Peter Parnell and Justin Richardson	They are slightly anthropomorphized, slightly fictionalized chinstrap penguins.
Penguins	Penguin Island	Anatole France	Satirical version of French history
Tacky the Penguin	Tacky the Penguin	Helen Lester	A penguin who does things differently than other penguins.
Onk Beakman	Skylanders: Mask of Power books	Cavan Scott	
Misha	Death and the Penguin, Penguin Lost	Andrey Kurkov	A cheeky penguin who gets in over his head in mafia affairs and political intrigue.
Eclair Ecleir Eicler	Overlord	Kugane Maruyama	Also appears in anime series based on light novel.

=== Comics ===
Character	Origin	Creator	Notes
Alfred	Zig et Puce	Alain Saint-Ogan	The pet penguin of the title characters. The Angoulême International Comics Festival named the Prix Alfred award after the character.
Duke	Boner's Ark	Mort Walker	One of the passengers on board of Boner's ark.
Frobisher	Doctor Who Magazine and two Big Finish audio dramas	Steve Parkhouse and John Ridgway	A shapeshifting alien who prefers to take the guise of a penguin.
Opus	Bloom County, Outland, Opus	Berkeley Breathed	A penguin from the Falkland Islands. He is the most recognizable character from the franchise and was the star of many of its spin-offs.
Penguin	If...	Steve Bell	Actual name is Prince Philip of Greece Penguin.
Ping	Peter og Ping	Storm P. (Robert Storm Petersen)	Peter's penguin, who became the breakout character of the series. A Danish comics prize has been named after the character.
Pingo	Rasmus Klump	Carla and Vilhelm Hansen	One of Rasmus' best friends.
Pokey the Penguin	Pokey the Penguin	Steve Havelka	
Professor Percival Penguin	The Ongoing Adventures of Rocket Llama	Alex Langley, Nick Langley	
Sparky the Wonder Penguin	This Modern World	Tom Tomorrow	A fast-talking penguin (sometimes identified as an auk) who wears a red visor and offers political commentary.
Squeak	Pip, Squeak and Wilfred	Bertram Lamb and Austin Bowen Payne	

== Theatre ==
Character	Origin	Author	Notes
Parker	Love Birds	Robert J. Sherman	The leader of "The Original Quack Pack" barbershop quartet
Presley	Love Birds	Robert J. Sherman	The sexiest penguin in the barbershop quartet, but not the brightest bird in the flock
Pewcey	Love Birds	Robert J. Sherman	The persnickety, judgmental member of the barbershop quartet
Puck	Love Birds	Robert J. Sherman	The youngest member of the barbershop quartet

== In media ==
=== Animation ===
Character	Origin	Notes
The Amigos	Happy Feet	A group of five Spanish-accented Adélie Penguins who befriend Mumble. The group is led by Ramón and the names of the other penguins are Nestor, Raul, Lombardo, and Rinaldo.
Badtz-Maru	Sanrio	
Big Penguin	The Paz Show	
Esmeralda	Mawaru Penguin Drum	
Penguin 1	Mawaru Penguin Drum	
Penguin 2	Mawaru Penguin Drum	
Penguin 3	Mawaru Penguin Drum	
Chilly Willy	Chilly Willy	A penguin who does not enjoy being cold, from the classic Walter Lantz cartoons. In addition to his animated cartoons, also had his own comic book in the 1950s.
Cody Maverick	Surf's Up	
Zeke "Big Z" Topanga	Surf's Up	
Lani Aliikai	Surf's Up	
Tank Evans	Surf's Up	
Cozy Heart Penguin	Care Bears	One of the Care Bear Cousins. She is lilac with a white face and her tummy symbol is a red heart wearing a pink woolly hat.
Feathers McGraw	The Wrong Trousers	A silent, yet sinister, penguin who is a notorious criminal mastermind and bird of many faces – long thought to be a chicken, Feathers McGraw is actually exposed as a penguin, when his plan to rob a museum of precious diamonds was foiled by Wallace and Gromit. He disguises himself as a chicken by wearing a red rubber glove on his head.
Fred	Sitting Ducks	A penguin who migrated from Antarctica to Ducktown.
Gloria	Happy Feet	She is Mumble's love interest and eventually becomes his mate
Gunter	Adventure Time	The penguin companion of the Ice King. He is later revealed to be a form of the primordial alien Orgalorg.
Hippo	Mermaid Melody Pichi Pichi Pitch	
Helen the Penguin	Animal Stories	The main character of the episode "Helen the Penguin".
Henry	Oswald	
Hubie, Marina and Rocko	The Pebble and the Penguin	
King Charlton and Edgar	My Little Pony	An evil king who seeks to freeze the world with his icy vision and his goodhearted son
Marlon, Rocky and Bluey	Avenger Penguins	A trio of motorcycling penguins who repel Caractacus P. Doom's evil schemes
Mrs. Penguin	Top Wing	Penny's mom
Mr. Penguin	Top Wing	Penny's dad
Mumble	Happy Feet	An emperor penguin who is the main character of the movie
Oswaldo	Oswaldo	
Pablo	The Backyardigans	
Pablo the Penguin	The Three Caballeros	Features in the segment "The Cold-Blooded Penguin".
Pappy	The Paz Show	
Paz	The Paz Show	
Pecola	Pecola	
Penny	The Koala Brothers	
Penny	Top Wing	A cadet who is an underwater expert with her Aqua Runner
Petey	Top Wing	Penny's little brothers and sisters
Phoebe	Top Wing	Penny's little brothers and sisters
Precious	Top Wing	Penny's little brothers and sisters
Phoenix	Top Wing	Penny's little brothers and sisters
Portia	Top Wing	Penny's little brothers and sisters
Presley	Top Wing	Penny's little brothers and sisters
Pascal	Top Wing	Penny's little brothers and sisters
Pen^{2}	Neon Genesis Evangelion	
Penguin Waiters	Mary Poppins	Serve tea to Mary and Bert. One made a cameo in "Who Framed Roger Rabbit". They also appeared in House of Mouse as part of the staff working alongside Goofy.
Peso	Octonauts	The Octonauts' ship's medic
Peggi	Tokyo ESP	A mysterious penguin with the ability to fly. It is also known as "The Collector" and has the power to remove and eat other people's ESP abilities.
Pegitan	Healin' Good Pretty Cure	The penguin partner of Chiyu.
Skipper, Kowalski, Rico, Private	Madagascar	A crafty group of penguins who try to escape the zoo to go back to Antarctica. The penguins got their own TV series and also a movie.
Penguin	Oggy and the Cockroaches	A minor character in the series.
Penguin	Shirokuma Cafe	
Pingu	Pingu	The title character of the series
Pinga	Pingu	Pingu's sister
Pingo	Pingu	One of Pingu's friends
Pingi	Pingu	Pingu's love interest
Pip	T.O.T.S.	
Playboy Penguin	Looney Tunes	A mute skating baby penguin that seeks Bugs Bunny for help
Pororo the Little Penguin	Pororo the Little Penguin	
PPP (PENGUINS Performance Project)	Kemono Friends	An all-penguin idol group, consisting of Princess, a royal penguin; Emperor, an emperor penguin; Gean, a gentoo penguin; Rocker, a rockhopper penguin; and Hululu, a humboldt penguin.
Scamper	The Adventures of Scamper the Penguin	
Spinner	Wild Kratts	A young emperor penguin chick who was named by Martin. He was named by him because he likes to spin, especially when fed fish.
Tennessee Tuxedo	Tennessee Tuxedo and His Tales	Lives with Chumley the Walrus and has various misadventures at the zoo.
Tootsie the Penguin	Donald Duck	A baby penguin in the classic 1939 cartoon "Donald's Penguin"
Tux	Out of Jimmy's Head	
Tuxedo Sam	Sanrio	
Tip	The Little Mermaid II: Return to the Sea	
Wheezy	Toy Story 2	A squeaky toy penguin who was broken for most of the film, then fixed by the end but following the third film was sold at a yard sale
Zidgel, Midgel, Fidgel, and Kevin	3-2-1 Penguins!	
Peabo "Pudge" Pudgemyer	Cats Don't Dance	A little penguin and Danny's first friend. He looks up to Danny as a big brother.
Jessica and Alex	Oggy and the Cockroaches	Jessica is a female that appears in three animated episodes. Alex is a male that only appears in "Keep Cool".
Topper	Santa Claus Is Comin' to Town	
Unnamed Baby Penguin	The Adventures of Blinky Bill	A chick who thought Flap was its mother
Caruso	The Little Polar Bear	A penguin who strangely enough lives in the Arctic and is close with Lars and co. He leads a troop of lemmings in every appearance. In "The Mysterious Island" the villainous polar bear Brutus, who was sick of Caruso's ever constant singing, dancing and cheerfulness, decides to get rid him by trapping him in a train (along with Lars and Robbie who attempt to prevent this). In the Galapagos he falls in love with a female Galapagos penguin and in the end decides to stay in the Galapagos with his love. His origins are revealed in "A Visitor from the South Pole" where he was found lost at sea by Orca who gladly brought him to the Arctic. He becomes liked by many except for Brutus who again tries to get rid of him (but fails this time).
Pamie & Nick	Adventures of the Little Koala	Twin little blue penguins and close friends with Roobear. Pamie is female and is usually portrayed as gluttonous and having a slight crush on Roobear (though he already has a girlfriend). Nick is male and is typically more level-headed, yet does have a sense of humor.

=== Video games ===
Character	Origin	Notes
Overbite	Penguin Land	Commander of a special Penguin Task Force. His mission is to bring fragile eggs back safely to home from a foreign land.
Pentarou	Parodius, Yume Penguin Monogatari, Antarctic Adventure, Tsurikko Penta, Super Fisherman Penta, Balloon Penta, Hie Hie Penta: Ice Cream Catcher, and Penta no Tsuri Bōken	
Chill Penguin	Mega Man X	A Ice-Themed Maverick who is one of the eight Maverick bosses.
Delibird	Pokémon	An Ice and Flying-type Pokémon first discovered in Johto.
Eiscue	Pokémon	An Ice-type Pokémon first discovered in Galar.
Piplup, Prinplup, Empoleon	Pokémon	The Water-type Starter Pokémon evolution line of Sinnoh.
Killer Penguin	Zoo Tycoon 2: Extinct Animals	Highly aggressive species of penguin (Eudyptes omnicidus) acting as an Easter Egg animal.
King Dedede	Kirby	A recurring character who frequently switches between being an ally of Kirby and an opponent he must fight.
Sgt. James Byrd	Spyro the Dragon	First appearance was in Spyro 3: Year of the Dragon.
Pengo	Pengo	
Penta Penguin	Crash Team Racing	An individual penguin based on the enemy penguins in Crash Bandicoot 2: Cortex Strikes Back.
Penguin Bros	Motor Toon Grand Prix/Motor Toon Grand Prix 2	A twin penguin gangster
Paxton and Philbert (also known as "Sheep" or "The Thing")	Runescape	
Prinny	Disgaea	Penguin with head winged bat
Dr. Akaggy	Starbound	
Don Pygoscelis	Kingdom of Loathing	Leader of the Penguin Mafia. Named after Pygoscelis, a genus of penguins.
DJ Grooves	A Hat in Time	A Movie Director who runs Dead Bird Studio. He is a major character in the Battle of the Birds section of the video game A Hat in Time.

=== Other media (toys, mascots, logos, etc.) ===
Character	Origin	Notes
Iceburgh	Pittsburgh Penguins	Iceburgh is the official mascot of the Pittsburgh Penguins. He debuted for the 1991–92 NHL season. Iceburgh was known as "Icey" in the 1995 film Sudden Death starring Jean-Claude Van Damme, filmed at the Pittsburgh Civic Arena. In the movie, the Iceburgh costume was worn by Faith Minton. The name is a play on the words "iceberg" and "Pittsburgh". He usually wears a Penguins jersey with the number "00". The costume is almost identical to that of the Wilkes-Barre/Scranton Penguins' team mascot, "Tux." The only differences are that Iceburgh has an orange neck, and Tux's neck is red; Iceburgh wears black gloves, while Tux wears red; and Tux wears the number "99" on his back with the Wilkes-Barre/Scranton Penguins logo on the front of his jersey.
Tux	Linux	He is the mascot of the Linux kernel and appears in many other Linux programs, usually in different styles. He has also appeared in his own video games, such as Tux Racer, Extreme Tux Racer, Tux Math Scrabble, TuxWordSmith, Tux Math, SuperTux, SuperTuxKart, and Tux Paint. Tux has also appeared in other video games, including OpenArena, Pingus, FreedroidRPG, Team Fortress 2, FreeCiv and many others. In some games, he has a female counterpart named Penny or Gown. Other female counterparts of Tux include Trixi (Tux 2) and Tuxette, which is the female leader name of the Antarctic civilization in FreeCiv (the male leader name being Tux). Tux also had appearances in other media too, such as appearing in a Froot Loops commercial as a squeaky toy, having an uncredited use in a YouTube video by Toutsmith called "Al Gore's Penguin Army", and appearing in various merchandise, such as having his own October Toys Gwin toy and appearing on a WMF "Sealion" fork.

== See also ==
- Cultural depictions of penguins
- List of fictional birds
