= Birds of Prey (disambiguation) =

Birds of prey are species of carnivorous birds.

Birds of Prey may also refer to:

== Film & Television ==
- Birds of Prey (1927 film), an American silent film directed by William James Craft
- Birds of Prey (1930 film), a British mystery film directed by Basil Dean
- Birds of Prey (1973 film), a TV film starring David Janssen
- Birds of Prey (2020 film), a film in the DC Extended Universe based on the Batman spin-off comics property Birds of Prey
- Birds of Prey (TV series), a 2002 TV drama series
- "Birds of Prey" (Arrow), an episode of Arrow

== Literature ==
- Birds of Prey (Drake novel), a 1984 novel by David Drake
- Birds of Prey (Smith novel), a 1997 novel by Wilbur Smith
- Birds of Prey (team), a fictional group in comic books published by DC Comics

== Games ==
- Birds of Prey (video game), a 1992 flight simulator for the Amiga and IBM PC by Argonaut Games
- IL-2 Sturmovik: Birds of Prey, a 2009 combat flight simulation game
- Birds of Prey, a table top air combat game from Ad Astra Games

== Music ==
- Birds of Prey (band), a heavy metal super group
- Birds of Prey (Godley & Creme album), a 1983 album by Godley & Creme
- Birds of Prey (Hank Roberts album), a 1990 album by Hank Roberts
- "Birds of Prey", a song by Christina Aguilera from Bionic

== Other uses ==
- Birds of Prey (ski course), Beaver Creek, Colorado, United States

== See also ==
- Bird of Prey (disambiguation)
- Birds of Pray, a 2003 album by Live
- List of fictional birds of prey
