= Plugger =

Plugger may refer to:

- Precision Lightweight GPS Receiver (PLGR), a US military handheld GPS system colloquially known as the "plugger"
- Flip-flops, a type of footwear similar to sandals but without securing the ankles
- Tony Lockett, a former Australian rules footballer
- Song plugger, a musician employed by a music publisher to promote their songs
- Plugger, known as Lugga in the US, a light blue Caribbean tow truck from Roary the Racing Car

== See also ==
- Pluggers, comic strip
