= List of fictional birds =

This list of fictional birds is subsidiary to the list of fictional animals. Ducks, penguins and birds of prey are not included here, and are listed separately at List of fictional ducks, List of fictional penguins, and List of fictional birds of prey. For non-fictional birds see List of individual birds.

== Struthioniformes (ostriches) ==
Name	Work	Notes
Big Eggo	Big Eggo	
Madame Upanova	The "Dance of the Hours" segment of Fantasia	
Hennie	Hey Duggee	
Lola	Téléchat	
Lydia	Jim Henson's Animal Show	A puppet ostrich
Olivia Burke	Goat	A roarball player with a low self-esteem.
Ossie	The Tarax Show and Hey Hey It's Saturday	
Priscilla	The Casagrandes	Sergio's crush

== Casuariformes (cassowaries and emu) ==
Name	Species	Work	Notes
Emu	Emu	Emu and others	
LiMu Emu	Emu	Insurance Sales-Emu (Liberty Mutual)	

== Apterygiformes (kiwis) ==
Name	Work	Notes
Clive	Jim Henson's Animal Show	A puppet kiwi bird
Goodnight Kiwi	Goodnight Kiwi	
Ivy	Ivy the Kiwi?	
Ninja Kiwi	Bloons TD	Ninja Kiwi is a placeable tower in Bloons TD 5

== Anseriformes (waterfowl) ==
See also List of fictional ducks and List of fictional ducks in animation

Name	Species	Work	Notes
N/A	Goose	The Goose that Laid the Golden Eggs	
Akka of Kebnekaise	Greylag goose	The Wonderful Adventures of Nils	The strict but kind-hearted matriarch of the wild geese flock
Alice and Chloe	Canada geese	Rio	
Boris	Goose	Balto	A Russian snow goose who helps raise Balto as a puppy.
Choose Goose	Goose	Adventure Time	
Gandy Goose	Goose	Terrytoons cartoons	
Gladstone Gander	Goose	Donald Duck cartoons	
Gus Goose	Goose	Donald Duck cartoons	
Louis	Trumpeter swan	The Trumpet of the Swan and the 2001 film of the same name	
Martin (Morten)	Domestic goose	The Wonderful Adventures of Nils	A goose originally belonging to Nils's family which flies away with a flock of wild geese and later befriends Nils.
Mother Goose	Goose	Mother Goose and Grimm	
Mr. Ping	Goose	Kung Fu Panda	
Syd 'Swannie' Skilton	Mute swan	Mascot of the Sydney Swans	
Wammes Waggel	Goose	Tom Poes	

== Galliformes (landfowl) ==
Name	Species	Work	Notes
Aracuan Bird	East Brazilian chachalaca	Walt Disney cartoons	
Billina	Chicken	Multiple Land of Oz books	
Booker	Chicken	U.S. Acres	
Calimero	Chicken	Calimero	A little black chicken with an egg shell on his head
Chanticleer	Chicken	Rock-a-Doodle	
Chica the Chicken	Animatronic Chicken	Five Nights at Freddy's	A yellow colored animatronic chicken, in which you must fend off in order to survive the night shift at the fictional family restaurant known as Freddy Fazbear's Pizza.
Chicken	Chicken	Cow and Chicken	
Chicken Boo	Chicken	Animaniacs	A six-foot-tall chicken.
Clara Cluck	Chicken	Walt Disney cartoons	
Cornelius "Corny" Rooster	Chicken	Mascot of Kellogg's Corn Flakes	
Fire Chicken (Fire Phoenix)	Chicken	Brave Animated Series	A chicken demon.
Foghorn Leghorn	Chicken	Looney Tunes and Merrie Melodies	
General Tsao	Chicken	Sly 3: Honor Among Thieves	A Chinese general who forced the Panda King's daughter to marry him.
Gobbler	Turkey	Beryl the Peril	The pet of Beryl.
Goldie	Golden pheasant	Rock-a-Doodle	
Gyro Gearloose	Chicken	Donald Duck cartoons	
Henny Penny	Chicken	Henny Penny	More commonly known in the United States as Chicken Little.
KickinChicken	Chicken	Poppy Playtime	A member of the Smiling Critters. His pendant is a red Star.
Leafie	Chicken	Leafie, A Hen into the Wild	
Lottie Dottie Chicken (Galinha Pintadinha)	Chicken	Lottie Dottie Chicken and Lottie Dottie Mini	A blue white dotted Brazilian chicken.
Lord Shen	Indian peafowl	Kung Fu Panda 2	A leucistic peacock.
Marquis de Canteclaer	Chicken	Tom Poes	
Matilda	Chicken	Angry Birds	
Nugget	Chicken	Ace Combat	Project ACES' mascot
Panchito Pistoles	Chicken	The Three Caballeros	
Pavolia Reine	Peafowl	Hololive Production's Virtual YouTuber	A peafowl princess who got lost in the human world and became a Virtual YouTuber for hololive Indonesia.
Peep	Chicken	Peep and the Big Wide World	
Pickles	Chicken	Bionic Max	
Roy	Chicken	U.S. Acres	
Roya	Indian peafowl	Shimmer and Shine	The pet of Princess Samira.
Roz Specklehen	Faverolles	Shoe (comic strip)	A waitress at Roz's Roost; serves breakfast to other birds around.
Sheldon	Chicken	U.S. Acres	An unhatched chicken egg.
Super Chicken	Chicken	The Super Chicken segment of George of the Jungle	

== Phoenicopteriformes (flamingos) ==
Name	Work	Notes
Freddy	T.O.T.S.	
Isabel, Annabelle, and Maribelle the Flamingos	64 Zoo Lane	
Pinkster	Wild Kratts	

== Columbiformes (pigeons and doves) ==
Name	Species	Work	Notes
Archimedes	White dove	Team Fortress 2	Archimedes is a cosmetic item for the Medic. When equipped, he is seen perched on his right shoulder.
Bernice	Pigeon	Sesame Street	Bert's pet pigeon who does not know how to coo and do things that he and Ernie do
Dab	Dodo	Ice Age	
Dodo	Dodo	Alice in Wonderland and the 1951 film by the same name	
Gogo Dodo	Dodo	Tiny Toon Adventures	
Gladys	Pigeon	Muppets from Space	The Birdman's pet pigeon and sweetheart
The Goodfeathers (Squit, Bobby, and Pesto)	Pigeons	Animaniacs	
Homer Pigeon	Pigeon	Walter Lantz cartoons	
Lovey-Dove	Pigeon	Ghost Trick: Phantom Detective	A blue pigeon who likes to sit on Pigeon Man's head
Sancho	Pigeon	The Casagrandes	A deformed pigeon who is Sergio's best friend. He has only one foot.
Speckled Jim	Pigeon	Blackadder Goes Forth	A carrier pigeon shot by Edmund Blackadder, leading to Blackadder's court-martial for the offence.
Willow	Western crowned pigeon	Angry Birds Stella	
Yankee Doodle Pigeon	Pigeon	Dastardly and Muttley in their Flying Machines	

== Cuculiformes (cuckoos and roadrunners) ==
Name	Species	Work	Notes
Little Beeper	Roadrunner	Tiny Toon Adventures	
Road Runner	Roadrunner	Looney Tunes and Merrie Melodies	
Rowdy	Roadrunner	Mascot of the University of Texas at San Antonio Roadrunners	
Sonny the Cuckoo Bird	Cuckoo	Mascot of Cocoa Puffs	
Speed Limit	Greater roadrunner	Wild Kratts	

== Caprimulgiformes (nightjars, hummingbirds, and swifts) ==
Name	Species	Work	Notes
Flit	Ruby-throated hummingbird	Pocahontas and Pocahontas II: Journey to a New World	
Violet Sabrewing	Violet sabrewing	DuckTales (2017)	

== Nyctibiidae (potoos) ==
Name	Species	Work	Notes
Melody	Common potoo	Angry Birds 2	Introduced in 2022

== Gruiformes (cranes, rails, and allies) ==
Name	Species	Work	Notes
Captain and Connie Crane	Cranes	PB&J Otter	Two cranes, each of either sex, who watch over Peanut, Baby Butter and Jelly Otter in most episodes of the series.
Cassandra the Crane	Red-crowned crane	64 Zoo Lane	
Crazylegs Crane	Crane	The All New Pink Panther Show	
Master Crane	Black-necked crane	Kung Fu Panda	

== Charadriiformes (gulls, terns, auks, and waders) ==
Name	Species	Work	Notes
N/A	Gull	Gaston Lagaffe	The aggressive seagull owned by Gaston Lagaffe.
Garvey Gull	Gull	Donald Duck cartoons	
Gertrude and Heathcliff	not specified	Red Skelton's vaudeville and television acts	
Gunnar the Seagull	Black-headed gull	64 Zoo Lane	
Irving "Irv" Seagull	Kelp Gull	Shoe	A local repairman at Irving Oil Corporation.
Jonathan Livingston Seagull	Lesser-black backed gull	Jonathan Livingston Seagull and the 1973 film of the same name	
Numenia	Whimbrel	Numenia and the Hurricane	
Puffo, Mama Puffin, Puff, Finnster	Atlantic puffins	Wild Kratts	
Scuttle	Gull	The Little Mermaid	
Thomas, Sharon, Lewis and Jamie the Puffins	Atlantic puffins	64 Zoo Lane	
Kehaar	Black-headed gull	Watership Down	

== Gaviiformes (loons) ==
Name	Work	Notes
Becky	Finding Dory	
Bomb	Angry Birds	
Dave and Ping Pong	Camp Lazlo	
Loon	Shoe (comic strip)	A newspaper/mail carrier and country guitar player.
Shirley McLoon	Tiny Toon Adventures	

== Sphenisciformes (penguins) ==
See List of fictional penguins

== Procellariiformes (albatrosses, shearwaters, petrels, and storm-petrels) ==
Name	Species	Work	Notes
Orville	Albatross	The Rescuers	
Storm	Albatross	Sonic the Hedgehog	
Wilbur	Albatross	The Rescuers Down Under	

== Ciconiiformes (storks) ==
Name	Species	Work	Notes
Ava	White stork	T.O.T.S.	
Bodhi	White stork	T.O.T.S.	
J.P.	White stork	T.O.T.S.	
Larrison	White stork	Camp Lazlo	
Mr. Stork	White stork	Dumbo and Lambert the Sheepish Lion	
Ollie	White stork	Alfred J. Kwak	
Seamus the Stork	White stork	64 Zoo Lane	

== Pelecaniformes (pelicans, herons, ibises, and allies) ==
Name	Species	Work	Notes
Anabella	Heron	Doki	
Black Heron	Black heron	DuckTales (2017)	
Blue Beaky	Great blue heron	Wild Kratts	
Captain Candace Beakman	American white pelican	T.O.T.S.	
Gular	Brown pelican	Wild Kratts	
Kulinda and Ona	Hamerkops	The Lion Guard	
Iraktaan	Heron	Redwall	
Mort	Great white pelican	Camp Lazlo	
Nigel	Brown pelican	Finding Nemo	
Ono	Cattle egret	The Lion Guard	
Pauline the Pelican	Great white pelican	64 Zoo Lane	
Sebastian the Ibis	White ibis	Mascot of the Miami Hurricanes	
Seymore D. Fair	American white pelican	Mascot of the 1984 Louisiana World Exposition	
Warden of Marshwood Hill	Heron	Redwall	

== Cathartiformes (New World vultures) ==
See List of fictional birds of prey

== Accipitriformes (hawks, eagles, and Old World vultures) ==
See List of fictional birds of prey

== Strigiformes (owls) ==
See List of fictional birds of prey

== Trogoniformes (trogons) ==
Name	Species	Work	Notes
Burdette	Resplendent quetzal	It's a Big Big World	

== Bucerotiformes (hornbills and hoopoes) ==
Name	Species	Work	Notes
Zazu	Southern red-billed hornbill	The Lion King	

== Coraciiformes (kingfishers, rollers, and bee-eaters) ==
Name	Species	Work	Notes
Kiki	Malachite kingfisher	Robinson Crusoe	
Olly	Laughing kookaburra	One of the mascots of the 2000 Summer Olympics	

== Piciformes (woodpeckers and toucans) ==
Name	Species	Work	Notes
Eva	Keel-billed toucan	Rio	
Hal	Emerald toucanet	Angry Birds	
Headbanger	Pileated woodpecker	Wild Kratts	
Rafael	Toco toucan	Rio	
Tallulah the Toucan and Taco the Toucan	Toco toucans	64 Zoo Lane	
Toucan Dan	Toco toucan	Timon & Pumbaa	
Señor Túcan	Toucan	Dora the Explorer	
Toucan Sam	Toucan	Mascot of Froot Loops	
Tuca	Toucan	Tuca & Bertie	
Zippi and Zac	Toucans	Toucan Tecs	
Mr. Woodbird	Red-headed woodpecker	T.O.T.S.	
Woody Woodpecker	Woodpecker	Walter Lantz cartoons	The character resembles a pileated woodpecker, despite being inspired by an encounter with an acorn woodpecker.
Bean the Dynamite	Woodpecker	Sonic the Fighters	In the Sonic the Hedgehog comic book series by Archie, Bean is a duck.

== Falconiformes (falcons and caracaras) ==
See List of fictional birds of prey

== Suliformes/Phalacrocoraciformes (frigatebirds, cormorants, darters) ==
Name	Species	Work	Notes
Bird Brain	Blue-footed booby	T.U.F.F. Puppy	One of the main villains of the show. He is a genius, but he can't fly.
Silas	Blue-footed booby	Ice Age: Continental Drift	Silas is based on both a petrel and a blue-footed booby, despite official sources claiming him to just be the latter.

== Psittaciformes (parrots) ==
Name	Species	Work	Notes
Abelardo Montoya	Parrot	Sésamo	The Mexican counterpart of Big Bird.
Ace	Parakeet	Powerbirds	
Andrea	Parrot	Kaj & Andrea	A puppet from the Danish series Kaj & Andrea
Arpeggio	Yellow-faced parrot	Sly 2: Band of Thieves	The leader of the Klaww Gang who sought immortality and hoped to gain it by merging himself with the Clockwerk frame.
Bia, Carla, and Tiago	Spix's macaws	Rio 2	
Black Spot Pete	Eclectus parrot	Sly 3: Honor Among Thieves	A pirate who stole Reme Lousteau's scuba diving gear. He later lost it to Captain LeFwee.
Blu	Spix's macaw	Rio	Full name Tyler Blu Gunderson.
Captain Flint	Festive amazon	Treasure Island	The pet of Long John Silver. Named after Captain Flint.
Captain LeFwee	Eclectus parrot	Sly 3: Honor Among Thieves	Despite being identified as a male, his coloration coincides more with the female of the species; a pirate known by many as the "smartest man on the seven seas".
Carrie the Cockatoo	Sulphur-crested cockatoo	64 Zoo Lane	
Eduardo	Spix's macaw	Rio 2	
Felipe	Scarlet macaw	Rio 2	
Iago	Scarlet macaw	Aladdin	The pet of Jafar.
Jewel	Spix's macaw	Rio	
José Carioca	Parrot	The Three Caballeros	
Lory	Lory	Alice's Adventures in Wonderland	
Mak	Scarlet macaw	Robinson Crusoe	
Mark Beaks	Gray parrot	DuckTales (2017)	
Mimi	Spix's macaw	Rio 2	
Mithu	Rose-ringed parakeet	Meena	The pet of Meena.
Nigel	Sulphur-crested cockatoo	Rio	
Pirate Parrot	Parrot	Mascot of the Pittsburgh Pirates	
Poco Loco	Scarlet macaw	Sesame Street	An anthropomorphic parrot who appeared on Sesame Street in 1974 to 1980; appears with Big Bird in some sketches
Polly	Cockatoo	Ace Attorney	Yanni Yogi's pet parrot and witness in a murder trial
Polly	Parakeet	Powerbirds	
Poppy	Lutino cockatiel	Angry Birds Stella	
Polynesia	Parrot	Dr. Dolittle	
Roberto	Spix's macaw	Rio 2	
Rio	Scarlet macaw	One of the Rainforest Cafe mascots	
Sergio	Scarlet macaw	The Casagrandes	One of the pets of the Casagrande family.
Stella	Galah	Angry Birds	
Torippii Sorano	Parrot	Shima Shima Tora no Shimajirou	One of the four main characters. He is a cheerful and fashionable parrot who loves singing and planes.

== Passeriformes (perching birds) ==
Name	Species	Work	Notes
N/A	Canary	King-Size Canary	A canary that grows to an enormous size after a cat pours growth formula on him.
Alcor	Raven	Little Witch Academia	The pet of Professor Ursula.
Bertie	Song thrush	Tuca & Bertie	
Big Bird	Canary	Sesame Street	DISPUTED: Big Bird's own Wikipedia article cites conflicting statements made on episodes of Sesame Street.
Big Red	Northern cardinal	Mascot of the Arizona Cardinals	
BJ Birdie and Ace	Blue jay	Mascot of the Toronto Blue Jays	
Bubbles	Oriole	Angry Birds	
Chirp	American robin	Peep and the Big Wide World	
Chuck	Atlantic canary	Angry Birds	
Clockers	Crows	Kirby and the Forgotten Land	The crows who are the members of the Beast Pack. They are responsible for kidnapping Waddle Dees by caging them.
Diablo	Raven	Sleeping Beauty	
Dolf	Crow	Alfred J. Kwak	
Fredbird	Northern cardinal	Mascot of the St. Louis Cardinals	
Gale	Violet-backed starling	Angry Birds Stella	
General Ironbeak	Raven	Mattimeo (Redwall)	
Grip	Raven	Barnaby Rudge	Based on Grip, a raven kept as a pet by Charles Dickens. The inspiration for Edgar Allan Poe's "The Raven".
Heckle and Jeckle	Yellow-billed magpies	Terrytoons cartoons	
Henry	Barn swallow	Henry the Barn Swallow	
Hans Huckebein	Raven	Hans Huckebein	An unlucky raven in a 1867-1868 picture story by Wilhelm Busch.
Hugin and Munin	Ravens	Norse mythology and fictional works based thereon, such as American Gods and Valhalla	The two ravens of Odin.
Jeremy	Crow	The Secret of NIMH	A clumsy crow who likes to collect string and shiny objects.
Jim, Jake, and Jay	Eastern bluebirds	Angry Birds	Collectively known as The Blues.
Kessie	Bluebird	The New Adventures of Winnie the Pooh	
Korvus Skurr	Raven	Doomwyte (Redwall)	Leader of the Doomwytes
Krakulat	Crow	Outcast of Redwall	
Luca	California scrub jay	Angry Birds Stella	
Mangiz	Crow	Mattimeo (Redwall)	Consultant of General Ironbeak
Margalo	Canary	Stuart Little	
Martin Jr.	Purple martin	Wild Kratts	
Matthew	Raven	Sandman	
Molly Mockingbird	Northern mockingbird	Texas State Bird Pageant	
Moo	Brown-headed cowbird	Wild Kratts	
Mordecai	Blue jay	Regular Show	
Moses the Raven	Raven	Animal Farm	
Nico	Canary	Rio	
Nyuni	Western yellow wagtail	The Lion Guard	
The Oriole Bird	Baltimore oriole	Mascot of the Baltimore Orioles	
Pedro	Red-crested cardinal	Rio	
Phobos and Deimos	Crows	Sailor Moon	The pet crows of Rei Hino.
Pikkie	Eurasian magpie	Alfred J. Kwak	
Poe	Raven	Mascot of the Baltimore Ravens	
Poe	Raven	Poppy Playtime	A violet-indigo raven who is one of the Nightmare Critters. Their pendant is a Thundercloud.
Quoth	Raven	Discworld	
Razar	Raven	Legends of Chima	The Prince of the Raven tribe.
Red	Northern cardinal, desert cardinal	Angry Birds	
Shoe	Purple martin	Shoe	Full name P. Martin "Shoe" Shoemaker.
Sir Raven	Raven	The Grim Adventures of Billy and Mandy	
Skyler	Eurasian Skylark	Shoe	An overeducated but underachieving nephew Cosmo raises.
Snipes	Black-billed magpie	Rock-a-Doodle	
Spike, Mama Shrike, Thorn, Spear, and Spike Jr.	Loggerhead shrikes	Wild Kratts	
Sweet Tweet	Greater honeyguide	Wild Kratts	
Tamaa	Greater racket-tailed drongo	The Lion Guard	
Terence	Northern cardinal, desert cardinal	Angry Birds	
Thrash	Brown thrasher	Mascot of the Atlanta Thrashers	
Tic Tic Bird	Red-billed oxpecker	64 Zoo Lane	
Tweety	Canary	Looney Tunes and Merrie Melodies	
Walt	Canary	The Loud House	One of the pets of the Loud family.
Queen Warbeak	Sparrow	Redwall	
Wave	Swallow	Sonic the Hedgehog	
William the Weaver Bird	Southern masked weaver	64 Zoo Lane	

== Mythical bird characters ==
Name	Type	Work	Notes
Aya Shameimaru	Crow tengu	Touhou Project	
Fawkes	Phoenix	Harry Potter	
Takanashi Kiara	Phoenix	Hololive Productions	A phoenix virtual YouTuber whose dream is to become the owner of a fast food chain, part of hololive English.

== Unspecified birds ==
- The eponymous protagonists from Angry Birds
- Birdie the Early Bird from the McDonald's commercials
- Buzby, a yellow bird of unspecified species in advertisements for British Telecom in the late 1970s/early 1980s
- Harvey Beaks from the show of the same name.
- Patana Tufillo from 31 Minutos
- The Phillie Phanatic, the mascot of the Philadelphia Phillies
- Pino, the Dutch counterpart of Big Bird in Sesamstraat
- Wattoo Wattoo, an oval-shaped black and white bird in Wattoo Wattoo Super Bird
- Woodstock, a bird of unknown species in the Charles M. Schulz's Peanuts comic strip.
- Multiple characters from Night in the Woods, such as Jeremy "Germ Warfare" Warton or Pastor Kate Young

== Fictional bird species ==
- Chocobo, a bird in the Final Fantasy series
- Jayhawk, part "jay" and part "hawk" this bird is the mascot of the Kansas Jayhawks sports teams and has roots in Kansas lore
- The Jubjub Bird from Lewis Carroll's poem "Jabberwocky"
- Breegulls, of which Kazooie is one, from the Banjo-Kazooie series
- Loftwings, flying mountable birds based on shoebills featured in The Legend of Zelda: Skyward Sword
- Mockingjay, central bird that is part of the Hunger Games trilogy
- Olverung, in The Olverung by Stephen Woodworth, published in Realms of Fantasy (December 2008)
- Porgs, a species of penguin or puffin-like birds that live on Ach-To in Star Wars: The Last Jedi
- The Roly-Poly Bird from Roald Dahl's children books The Enormous Crocodile and The Twits
- The Snip Snip Bird in 64 Zoo Lane
- Tinga Tinga Birds from Tinga Tinga Tales
- Twitter Bird, the mascot of Twitter
- Weatherbird, the mascot of the St. Louis Post-Dispatch; identified as a dicky-bird, a generic term for a small bird.

== Humans transformed into birds ==
- The six brothers turned into birds in German fairytale The Six Swans
- The eleven siblings cursed by their queenly stepmother in The Wild Swans
- Princess Odette, a human with a curse that turns her into a swan during the day in The Swan Princess
- The Swan Maiden, a magical bird who turns into a beautiful woman in several folktales
- Willy, a boy-turned-sparrow and main character in Willy the Sparrow

== See also ==
- List of avian humanoids
- List of fictional birds of prey
- List of fictional dinosaurs
- List of fictional ducks
- List of fictional penguins
- List of legendary creatures by type § Birds
