= List of fictional birds of prey =

This list of fictional birds of prey is subsidiary to the list of fictional birds. It is restricted to notable bird of prey characters from the world of fiction.

== Books ==
Character	Species	Origin	Author	Notes
Archimedes	Owl	The Once and Future King	T. H. White	Merlin's familiar. Remade by Disney as The Sword in the Stone.
Barn Owl	Barn owl	The Animals of Farthing Wood	Colin Dann	Informs Fox that he had a conversation with Tawny Owl who told him all about the animals' journey, which in turn lets him know the others are safe, but he can't say where the animals are heading because Tawny Owl did not tell him that information. He also appears in the TV series in the episode "Friends in Need".
Bess	Boreal owl	Guardians of Ga'Hoole	Kathryn Lasky	
Buteo	European honey buzzard	Loamhedge	Brian Jacques	
Captain Snow	Snowy owl	Redwall	Brian Jacques	
Chil	Kite	The Jungle Book, The Second Jungle Book	Rudyard Kipling	A male kite who helps rescue Mowgli from the Bandar-Logs.
The divine condor	Condor	The Return of the Condor Heroes	Jin Yong	
Tim Condor the Condor	Condor	Wild Beasties' of Outback New Zealand	Michael F. Katon	
Errol	Great grey owl	Harry Potter	J. K. Rowling	Weasley's aged owl
Farsight	Eagle	The Last Battle	C. S. Lewis	
Frightful	Peregrine falcon	My Side of the Mountain	Jean Craighead George	The avian companion of the story's main character, 12-year-old Sam Gribley.
Glimfeather, Master	Owl	The Silver Chair	C. S. Lewis	
Gorgo	Eagle	The Wonderful Adventures of Nils	Selma Lagerlöf	An eagle who was raised by the goose Akka.
Hedwig	Snowy owl	Harry Potter	J. K. Rowling	Harry Potter's pet owl
Hermes	Screech owl	Harry Potter	J. K. Rowling	Percy Weasley's pet owl
Holly	Owl	The Animals of Farthing Wood	Colin Dann	She is Tawny Owl's mate
Kestrel	Kestrel	The Animals of Farthing Wood	Colin Dann	
Laird Mactalon	Falcon	Salamandastron	Brian Jacques	
Mighty Megraw	Osprey	Marlfox	Brian Jacques	
Morbin Blackhawk	Hawk	The Green Ember (series)	S.D. Smith	The leader of the cruel Lords of Prey who terrorize the rabbits of Natalia.
Owl	Owl	Winnie-the-Pooh	A. A. Milne's	Knowledgeable yet spells things wrong like his name as 'Wol'.
Pandion Piketalon	Osprey	High Rhulain	Brian Jacques	
Pigwidgeon	Scops owl	Harry Potter	J. K. Rowling	Ron Weasley's pet owl
Rocangus	Falcon	Salamandastron	Brian Jacques	Son of Laird Mactalon
Skarlath	Kestrel	Outcast of Redwall	Brian Jacques	
Soren, Gylfie, Twilight, Digger	Owl	Guardians of Ga'Hoole	Kathryn Lasky	
Streak and Zan	Bald eagles	Guardians of Ga'hoole	Kathryn Lasky	
Stryk Redkite	Red kite	Mattimeo	Brian Jacques	A brave and somewhat stubborn kite who frees Redwall Abbey from General Ironbeak the raven.
Thorondor, Gwaihir, Landroval	Eagles	The Lord of the Rings	J. R. R. Tolkien	
Tawny Owl	Owl	The Animals of Farthing Wood	Colin Dann	An owl who makes the journey from Farthing Wood to White Deer Park.
Tobias	Red-tailed hawk	Animorphs	K. A. Applegate	A human who becomes trapped in the form of a hawk after overusing his shapeshifting abilities.
Vlad Vladikoff	Vulture	Horton Hears a Who!	Dr. Seuss	One of the main antagonists who tries to lose the Whoville planet from Horton.
Victor Von Vulture	Vulture	Ricky Ricotta's Mighty Robot vs. the Voodoo Vultures from Venus	Dav Pilkey	The main antagonist of the book. He is a Venusian vulture who hates living there because the heat always ruins everybody's food. He attempts to take over planet Earth so that he can enjoy eating his food, but fails and is thrown in jail at the end of the book.
Wise Owl	Owl	Little Grey Rabbit	Alison Uttley	A predatory owl who can be befriended with a hankie of truce. Gives information in return for items of value and hates being disturbed in daylight.
Alma LeFay Peregrine	Peregrine falcon	Miss Peregrine's Home for Peculiar Children	Ransom Riggs	The headmistress of a children's home for children with magical abilities.

== Comics ==
Character	Species	Origin	Notes
Blackie	Hawk	Blackhawk	The hawk of the team.
Cathryn Aura	Vulture	Kevin and Kell	Has a son called Nigel
Condorito	Andean condor	Condorito	Has a nephew called Coné
Gyoutenmaru	Hawk	Change 123	
Gulfan	Eagle	Yona of the Dawn	
Hooty	Owl	DC Comics	Hooty is the pet and sidekick of Doctor Mid-Nite.
Howland Owl	Owl	Pogo	
Loki Helios	Owl	Hoshi no Samidare	
Professor	Owl	Princess Resurrection	
Sarcophagus MacAbre	Buzzard	Pogo	
Redwing	Hawk	Marvel Comics	The companion of Falcon, with whom he shares a psychic link.
Shimshek	Hawk	Red River	
Simorgh	Eagle	Seirei Tsukai no Kenbu	
Oehoeboeroe	Owl	Paulus the woodgnome	A wise owl and good friend of Paulus the woodgnome in the eponymous children's comic strips and stories.
Ossie Owl	Owl	Acorn Green	A source of wisdom.
Uil	Owl	Olle Kapoen	A good friend of Olle Kapoen the gnome.
Urban	Owl	Ugglan Urban	An owl in a pantomime comic by Jan Romare.
Wiz	Merlin	Shoe (comic strip)	

== Film and television ==
Character	Species	Origin	Notes
Armstrong the Chickenhawk	Red-tailed hawk	Jim Henson's Animal Show	
Bon Haribon	Philippine eagle	Oyayi	A valiant character and the member of Pangkat Oyayi.
Buck	Vulture	Oscar's Oasis	
Charlie	Owl	New Zoo Revue	
Dr. Blinky	Owl	H.R. Pufnstuf	
Eagly	Bald eagle	Peacemaker	The title character's pet
Falcon	Peregrine falcon	Stuart Little 2	The main antagonist of the film who was later defeated by Stuart's biplane causing the plane to explode into pieces and fall into the trash can where Monty was looking for food. Voiced by James Woods
Freedom	Bald eagle	G.I. Joe: A Real American Hero	The avian companion of Spirit, a Native American tracker
Guffrey	Vulture	Jim Henson's Animal Show	A puppet vulture
Hillary	Great grey owl	Jim Henson's Animal Show	A puppet great grey owl
Hoots the Owl	Owl	Sesame Street	An owl that plays a saxophone. He debuted on Sesame Street for the 16th season (1985), but was retired from the show in the 32nd season (2001).
Kes	Kestrel	Kes	
Kyle	Secretarybird	Jim Henson's Animal Show	A puppet secretarybird
Longclaw	Owl	Sonic the Hedgehog	An alien anthropomorphic brown owl who was the title character's caretaker.
Ollie Beak	Owl	Tuesday Rendezvous	
Orson	Vulture	H.R. Pufnstuf	
Otis Owl	Owl	Jim Henson's Pajanimals	Jerry Bear's best friend
Sam the Eagle	Eagle	The Muppet Show	
Timothy	Owl	Jim Henson's Animal Show	A puppet owl
X	Owl	Mister Rogers' Neighborhood	
Wiser	Owl	Legends of Oz: Dorothy's Return	A fat owl who is clumsy and is good friends with Dorothy.

== Animation ==
Includes fully animated films and television series.

Character	Species	Origin	Notes
18	Owl	Sankarea	
003	Owlet	Descendants of Darkness	
Adler	Eagle	Driland	
Ash	Vulture	El Americano: The Movie	A vulture who is Martin's feared henchbird and never speaks.
Ajax	Lammergeier	Zambezia	
Astarte	Falcon	The Missing Lynx	
Aurora	Red-tailed hawk	Adventures from the Book of Virtues	
Avenger	Eagle	Birdman and the Galaxy Trio	
The Bald Eagle	Bald eagle	Tiny Toon Adventures	
Big Mama	Owl	The Fox and the Hound	
Bea Spells-a-Lot's Owl	Owl	Lalaloopsy	
Beaky Buzzard	Turkey vulture	Looney Tunes, Merrie Melodies	A buzzard who bears a closer resemblance to a vulture and a condor. He is not very smart and finds it hard to get food by himself.
Blue Eagle	Eagle	Happy Tree Friends	A female navy blue eagle who kills and uses Flaky for a new nest when she accidentally destroys it and kills one of her babies when tries to help one of her them back into its nest in "Take a Hike".
Bradford Buzzard	Vulture	DuckTales	Leader and founder of the criminal organization F.O.W.L.
Buzz Buzzard	Common buzzard	Woody Woodpecker	Woody's nemesis.
Buzzy, Dizzy, Flaps, and Ziggy	Vultures	The Jungle Book	Four vultures who closely resemble the Beatles because of their shaggy moptop haircuts and Liverpool accents. Buzzy resembles Ringo Starr, Dizzy resembles George Harrison, Flaps resembles Paul McCartney, and Ziggy resembles John Lennon.
Chip	Bald eagle	The Little Engine That Could	
Cat	Owl	Shounen Hollywood: Holly Stage for 49	
Chief Sekhuru	African fish eagle	Zambezia	
Concord Condor	Condor	Tiny Toon Adventures	A slight recreation of Beaky Buzzard.
Cosmic Owl	Owl	Adventure Time	
Cubasil	Owl	Zero no Tsukaima	
Cufflingk and Underlingk	Falcon	Valiant	
Divino	Owl	El Americano: The Movie	A wise elderly magician owl who works for Gayo's circus.
Elfis	Elf owl	Wild Kratts	An elf owl who helped Martin, Chris and Aviva find Koki and Jimmy who are lost in the Sonoran Desert.
Eris	Eagle	Legends of Chima	The Princess of the Eagle tribe
Eva	Snowy owl	Penguins of Madagascar	A female snowy owl who is North Winds intelligence analyst.
Fagin	Black vulture	War of the Birds	A sinister and sadistic male vulture who is responsible for killing other birds. In the last battle his dove slave betrayed him and he was incinerated.
Falcon	Peregrine falcon	Lego Ninjago: Masters of Spinjitzu	A robot falcon that mainly informs the ninja of evil
Friend Owl	Owl	Bambi	
Frosty	Snowy owl	Wild Kratts	A snowy owl who first appears in the episode Snowy Owl Invasion. He was named by Wild Kratts kids; Gavin, Ronan and Katie.
Fenghuang	Owl	Kung Fu Panda: Legends of Awesomeness	A female warrior who was a member of the previous generation of the Furious Five along with Master Shifu, but betrayed her teammates in search of power.
Fukolota	Owl	La Storia Della Arcana Famiglia	Felicità's companion owl.
Falcon	Falcon	Orange Neck	Falcon that kills Brovkin and his mate.
Grand Duke of Owls	Owl	Rock-A-Doodle	An evil owl with magical powers. He is the film's antagonist.
Golden Eagle	Golden eagle	The Boy Who Saw The Wind	
Gold Nugget	Snowy owl	Wild Kratts	A snowy owl who first appears in the episode Snowy Owl Invasion. He is named after his golden eyes.
Gorgo	Eagle	The Wonderful Adventures of Nils	A eagle who was raised by the goose Akka.
Gram	Owl	Break Blade	
Gondo	Black eagle	Zambezia	
Hadithi	African hawk-eagle	The Lion Guard	An African hawk-eagle who fakes having invented the Hadithi Spin.
Hawk	Hawk	Watership Down	Hawk that killed Violet, the rabbit.
Hawk	Hawk	The Secret of NIMH 2: Timmy to the Rescue	A hawk that attacks Timmy and Jenny on a hot air balloon while their journey to save her parents and Martin.
Hayabusa	Saker falcon	Mulan	Hayabusa is Shan Yu's pet falcon
Henery Hawk	Chickenhawk	Looney Tunes, Merrie Melodies	A young chickenhawk who tries to get himself a chicken, often pursuing Foghorn Leghorn, but sometimes catches someone who isn't a chicken since he's never actually seen one.
Hollow	Tawny owl	The Animals of Farthing Wood	He is the mate of Tawny Owl and is a genderbent version of Holly from the books.
Hoosuke	African scops-owl	Sket Dance	
Ikeburo	Owl	Cosplay Complex	
JunJun	Philippine eagle	Work It Out Wombats!	He likes to sing and play the guitar, and is best friends with Zadie.
Kagero	Owl	Basara	An owl kept by Ageha.
Kai	Peregrine falcon	Zambezia	
Kaya	Philippine eagle	Work It Out Wombats!	JunJun's older sister, who is a waiter at the Eat 'N Greet.
Kojiro	Falcon	Ayakashi - Japanese Classic Horror	
Lone Gunslinger	Turkey vulture	Ice Age: The Meltdown	
Lucky	Vulture	The Jungle Book 2	The Vultures' (Buzzy, Dizzy, Flaps, and Ziggy) friend who loves to annoy Shere Khan.
Marahute	Golden eagle	The Rescuers Down Under	A friend of Cody, who becomes captive to Percival C. McLeach until the rescuers save her and Cody.
Meneer de Uil (Mr. Owl)	Owl	De Fabeltjeskrant	Is the narrating protagonist of the cartoon.
Mighty Eagle	Bald eagle	The Angry Birds Movie	
Miss Friday	Vulture	One Piece	
Mpishi	African harrier-hawk	The Lion Guard	An African harrier-hawk who travels to the Pride Lands to look for a rare meal.
Mukuro Mist Owl	Owl	Kateikyoushi Hitman Reborn!	
Mzingo	White-backed vulture	The Lion Guard	A vulture who is a leader of the flock.
Nutsy and Trigger	Vultures	Robin Hood	Nutsy and Trigger are two vultures from the film Robin Hood, who formerly served as henchmen to Prince John during King Richard's absence. Then, when King Richard returned, they reformed and take orders from King Richard.
O and X	Owl	Daniel Tiger's Neighborhood	
Old Man	Owl	Sonic the Hedgehog	
Olga	Owl	Richard the Stork	An eccentric owl with an imaginary friend who helps Richard migrate to Africa.
Oliver	Owl	Animal Stories	
Olivia	Owl	Birdz	Eddie's friend.
Otto	Owl	Puffin Rock	A green owl who normally appears slightly uncoordinated. He is an expert flier and shares flying tips with Oona.
Owl	Short-eared owl	Little Bear	Can be pompous, but he is very wise and sometimes quite serious. He lives in a treehouse, prefers to participate in sensible games and likes reading as his hobby.
Owl	Brown owl	T.U.F.F. Puppy	Bird Brain's more recent henchmen upon being hired by Zippy.
Owl	Owl	Leafie, a Hen into the Wild	An owl who helped Greenie how to fly.
Owl	Owl	Winnie the Pooh (franchise)	A wise owl who is one of Winnie the Pooh's friends.
Owlowiscious	Horned owl	My Little Pony: Friendship is Magic	Twilight Sparkle's pet owl.
P-chan	Steller's sea eagle	Little Busters!	
Pet Shop	Falcon	JoJo's Bizarre Adventure: Stardust Crusaders	A sapient guard falcon with the ability to create and control ice.
Schultz	Owl	Daffy – The Commando, Looney Tunes	Von Vultur's assistant whom he often abuses.
Scoop	Snowy owl	Wild Kratts	A snowy owl chick.
Silver Wing	Bald eagle	Shaman King	
Sitka	Bald eagle	Brother Bear	A man who has the spiritual form of an eagle.
Slip Grip	Osprey	Wild Kratts	
Stomp	Secretarybird	Wild Kratts	A male secretarybird. He was one of the raptors that the Kratt brothers discovered.
Takaoka	Eagle	Damekko Dōbutsu	
Tawny Owl	Tawny owl	The Animals of Farthing Wood	An owl who makes the journey from Farthing Wood to White Deer Park. She is female, though in the books she was originally male, similarly to how her mate, Hollow, was originally female in the books.
The Great Owl	Owl	The Secret of NIMH	A friendly owl
Tiberius	Red-tailed hawk	The Secret Life of Pets	A hawk who helps Gidget find Max.
The Owl	Owl	Adventure Time	The leader of the animals of the tree in the episode "Up a Tree."
The Owl	Owl	The Owl	The eponymous owl who tries to overcome unfortunate circumstances, but end in her demise by her various appendages and body being dispensed of in unusual or comical ways.
Toriri	Owl	Keroro Land	
Various owls	Owl	Adventure Time	
Venus	Vulture	Paboo & Mojies	
Von Talon	Falcon	Valiant	
Von Vultur	Vulture	Daffy – The Commando, Looney Tunes	A German World War II commander.
Walter	Green owl	War of the Birds	
Wide Eye	Great Horned Owl	Wide-Eye	Fatherly, gentle and reliable, he watches over all the other animals.
Will	Owl	Anisava	
Zoe	Black-shouldered kite	Zambezia	

== Video games ==
Character	Species	Origin	Notes
Blathers	Owl	Animal Crossing	The curator of a museum in the Player's town. He suffers from a fear of bugs, but nevertheless takes care of them well.
Bloodwing		Borderlands	
Celeste	Owl	Animal Crossing: Wild World	Blathers' younger sister, who runs an observatory in the town's museum and assists the player in creating constellations. In Animal Crossing: New Leaf, she runs the museum's gift shop in the second floor.
Clockwerk	Eurasian eagle-owl	Sly Cooper	A wicked eagle owl who made himself immortal and robotic solely to kill Sly's family line. Before the events of the game, he murdered Sly's parents and left him an orphan. He is defeated in the first game, but his body parts are stolen by the Klaww Gang 2 years later. Neyla later fuses with his body frame to create "Clock-la" but dies along with him when his hate chip is crushed.
Condor	Condor	Ice Climber	A condor that stole vegetables that the Ice Climbers have to recover.
Coo	Owl	Kirby series	
Crimson Loftwing		The Legend of Zelda: Skyward Sword	
Dyna Blade	Enormous bird	Kirby series	
Dahila	Great horned owl	Angry Birds Stella	One of Stella's friends who likes to do experiments.
Eagle	Eagle	The Seven Adventures of Sindbad (シンドバッド7つの冒険; Shindobaddo 7tsu no bōken)	A giant red eagle that carries Sinbad.
Falco Lombardi	Pheasant	Star Fox series	Ace pilot of Team Star Fox
Golden Condor	Condor	Mystery Dungeon: Shiren the Wanderer	Divine bird, and protector of the Golden City, Amteca.
Ikaros	Golden eagle	Assassin's Creed Odyssey & origins	Ikaros was a male golden eagle companion of Pythagoras, who sent it to his daughter the Spartan misthios Kassandra.
Jet the Hawk	Hawk	Sonic Riders, Sonic Riders: Zero Gravity, Sonic Free Riders	
Kaepora Gaebora	Owl	The Legend of Zelda series	
Karasu	Crow/Raven	Fortnite	An anthropomorphic male crow/raven skin.
Kuro	Owl	Ori and the Blind Forest	Main antagonist of the Ori games.
Mighty Eagle	Bald eagle	Angry Birds	Mighty will destroy anything if a can of sardines is thrown from the slingshot.
Mighty Buzzard	Turkey vulture	Angry Birds Space	
Otus	Owl	Owlboy	
Rawk Hawk	Hawk	Paper Mario: The Thousand-Year Door	Acting as the boss of Chapter 3, Rawk Hawk is the reigning champion of the Glitz Pit, an arena located in Glitzville. He is a parody of professional wrestlers, particularly heels.
Skowl the Startling	Owl	Donkey Kong Country: Tropical Freeze	The leader of a parliament owls.
Silver	Peregrine falcon	Angry Birds 2	
Stormbird	Eagle	Horizon Zero Dawn	An Roc-sized robotic bird of prey patrolling certain game areas that appears as avoidable danger or antagonist.
Valor	Demacian eagle	League of Legends	A Demacian eagle and hunting companion to Quinn, a ranger in the Demacian army.

== As mascots, toys, logos, and other ==
Character	Species	Notes
Big Jay and Baby Jay	Hawks	Mascots for the Kansas Jayhawks.
Blitz	Hawk	One of the mascots for the Seattle Seahawks.
Baldwin	Bald eagle	Mascot of the Boston College Eagles.
Bald Eagle	Bald eagle	Standing on the Chyron Mountains in Republic Pictures
Chaddy the Owl	Owl	Official mascot of Oldham Athletic.
Duo	Owl	Mascot of the language-learning website and app Duolingo
Eddie Eagle	Bald eagle	Represents an eponymous gun safety program for the National Rifle Association of America.
Freddie and Frieda Falcon	Peregrine falcon	The mascots of Bowling Green State University.
Freddie Falcon	Falcon	Mascot of the Atlanta Falcons.
Hudson 'Hawka' Knights	Hawk	Mascot of the Hawthorn Hawks.
Herky	Tiger hawk	Mascot of the Iowa Hawkeyes
Eyeglasses Owl	Great horned owl	An owl who persuades people to get eyeglasses and contacts and is often annoyed by when people say Who? to him in the commercials for America's Best Contacts & Eyeglasses.
Mr. Know It Owl	Owl	
Nanashi Mumei	Owl	A virtual YouTuber with owl-like appearance and role as the Guardian of Civilization, part of the English branch of Hololive Productions.
Ozzie the Owl	Owl	The matchday mascot of Sheffield Wednesday F.C.
Sammy the Owl	Owl	The mascot for Conference USA's Rice University Owls from Houston, Texas.
Sam the Olympic Eagle	Eagle	The mascot for 1984 Summer Olympics.
Screech	Eagle	Mascot for the Washington Nationals.
Skyhawk	Hawk	One of the mascots for the Atlanta Hawks.
Slapshot	Eagle	Mascot for the Washington Capitals.
Swoop	Eagle	Mascots for the Philadelphia Eagles, Eastern Michigan University, Eastern Washington University, Miami University, and University of Utah
Takane Lui	Hawk	A virtual YouTuber with hawk-like appearance and role as the executive officer of Secret Society holoX, part of Hololive Productions.
Woodsy Owl	Owl	An icon for the United States Forest Service.
