= Bird of Prey (disambiguation) =

Bird of prey refers to several species of carnivorous birds.

Bird of Prey may also refer to:

== Aviation ==
- Boeing Bird of Prey, a black project Boeing aircraft
- Bird of Prey, a specific Boeing EC-135E aircraft

== Music ==
=== Albums ===
- Bird of Prey (album), an album by Zozobra

=== Songs ===
- "Sunset (Bird of Prey)", a 2000 song by Fatboy Slim
- "Bird of Prey" (Jim Morrison song), a song on the 1995 remastered edition of An American Prayer
- "Bird of Prey" (Uriah Heep song)
- "Bird of Pray", a 2025 song by Ziferblat
- "Bird of Prey", a song by Natalie Prass from Natalie Prass

== Film and television ==
- The Bird of Prey, a 1918 silent American drama starring Gladys Brockwell
- Bird of Prey (TV serial), a 1982 BBC drama series starring Richard Griffiths
- Bird of Prey, a 1995 American crime drama starring Lenny von Dohlen
- "Bird of Prey" (The Batman), a 2005 episode of the animated TV series The Batman
- Bird of Prey, a 2016 American short film directed by Marion Hill
- Bird of Prey, a 2018 American wildlife documentary
- Birds of Prey (2020 film), a 2020 American superhero film based on the DC Comics team the Birds of Prey

== Other uses ==
- Bird of Prey, part of the Batgirl: Year One comic series by DC Comics
- Bird of Prey (Star Trek), a fictional type of spacecraft in the Star Trek universe
- Birds of Prey (team), a DC Comics superhero team
- Bird of Prey drone, an uncrewed aerial system interceptor drone made by Airbus

== See also ==
- Birds of Prey (disambiguation)
- List of fictional birds of prey
- Preybird, a Star Wars starfighter
