= Mr. Know It Owl =

Series of educational videos

Mr. Know-It-Owl's Video School was a series of videos released on videocassette, and later repurposed to interactive CD-ROM, and is hosted by a purple owl puppet. The Mr. Know-It-Owl series was copyrighted by Apollo Educational Video (the home video arm of AIMS Media, later AIMS Multimedia). Aimed at younger children, Mr. Know-It-Owl (a play on "know-it-all"), attempts to educate children in safety, health, grammar, and the three Rs. There were over 10 videos released and a series of CD-ROM. The main characters were Phineas (a firefly), Scooter McGruder (a puppet child with red hair), and of course, Mr. Know-It-Owl (the purple owl with glasses).

== Main characters ==
=== Mr. Know-It-Owl ===
Mr. Know-It-Owl mostly has purple feathers but has shiny blue ones over his chest area and wears yellowish circular glasses. He lives inside a tree hollowed out to be his home. It includes a bookshelf with several books. He also has a globe, on which the firefly perched from time to time. A chalkboard appeared in one episode. While teaching a lesson, Mr. Know-It-Owl uses "the Window of Knowledge," which is a round window near the top of his tree that opens up before the video tutorial begins.

Mr. Know-It-Owl returned in a series of Interactive CD-ROM in 1997 where he was voiced by AIMS Multimedia co-president and an executive producer of the series- David S. Sherman, Ph.D.

=== Scooter McGruder ===
Scooter is a curious young boy with red hair, green eyes, and a yellow shirt with the letter "E" on it in red. He is often the one that is instructed by Mr. Know-It-Owl.

=== Phineas ===
Phineas is a firefly that lives with Mr. Know-It-Owl in his treehouse; his full name is Phineas T. Firefly.

== Videos ==
Over 10 videos of the Mr. Know-It-Owl series were made. The following video titles are listed below, along with their summaries.

- African Animals (Animals of Africa)
- All About Animals
- Arithmetic for Kids
- Dinosaurs and Strange Creatures (1988): Mr. Know It Owl introduces dinosaurs, using stop-motion animation dinosaur figures. Among the dinosaurs shown are Allosaurus (seen in the opening sequence), Brontosaurus, Coelophysis, Stegosaurus, Anatosaurus, Corythosaurus, Parasaurolophus, Saurolophus, Pteranodon, Ankylosaurus, Tyrannosaurus rex, Chasmosaurus, Triceratops, Monoclonius, and Styracosaurus. Afterwards is a segment about prehistoric mammals. Once again, stop motion animation figures are used. Some of the creatures which are shown are Deltatheridium (mispronounced as "Deltatherium"), Eohippus, Diatryma, Platybelodon, Baluchitherium, Glyptodon, Megatherium, Smilodon, and the woolly mammoth. Finally is a segment about various animal adaptations, including anteaters and chameleons. The first two segments were animated by Wah Chang (known for his work on Land of the Lost) and Mark D. Wolf respectively.
- Dragons and Sailboats
- Grammar as Easy as ABC
- Learning As We Play
- Letters, Colors, and Ducks
- MacDonald's Farm
- Make Your Own Toys - Toys At Your Fingertips
- Nature's Systems
- Health Tips (1986): The following videos are shown, with a total running time of approximately 45 minutes:
  - The Junk Food Man (10 minutes)
  - Nutrition: Try It, You'll Like It (11 minutes)
  - Magic Weapons For Healthy Teeth (15 minutes)
  - Ear Care (9 minutes).
- Safety Tips (1986): When Scooter moves, Mr. Know-It-Owl gives him several important safety tips in four short videos. The first, Emergencies: What Would You Do? (1977), deals with handling emergencies like drowning, ingesting chemicals, bleeding, and falling. The second features Roscoe's Rules (1973), in which a drumming bear toy offers tips on how to avoid strangers. The third is called Hush Puppy's Bright Idea (1976), in which the puppets emphasize the importance of wearing reflective materials and being careful at night. The fourth and final video Electrical Safety: A to Zap (1970), was an animated spiel about a naive housecat who receives a long lecture from a pink mouse about electrical safety.
- Under the Sea
- Weather (1987): Mr. Know-It-Owl's tutorial involves weather and how nature acts to cause the various weather patterns. It is 32 minutes long.

== Interactive multimedia ==
The series was later re-purposed into the interactive CD-ROM by AIMS Multimedia co-president and executive producer David S. Sherman and software architect Richard Williams, both of whom went on to design and produce AIMS Multimedia's DigitalCurriculum in 1999, the first educational video streaming software as a service (SaaS), a video curriculum on demand which was later sold to the Discovery Channel in 2004. The CD-ROM Mr. Know-It-Owl character was also voiced by Dr. Sherman.

- Mr. Know-It-Owl's Reading With Peter Cottontail
- Mr. Know-It-Owl's All About Animals
