= Pluggers =

American comic strip

- Author(s): Jeff MacNelly (1993–1997); Gary Brookins (1997–2020); Rick McKee (2020–present)
- Current status/schedule: Current strip
- Launch date: 1993; 33 years ago
- Syndicate(s): Tribune Content Agency
- Genre(s): Humor, Gag-a-day

Pluggers is a comic panel created by Jeff MacNelly (creator of Shoe) in 1993 that relies on reader submissions (referred to as "Pluggerisms") for the premise of each day's panel. In the context of this strip, "pluggers" are generally defined as rural, blue-collar workers who live a typical working-class American lifestyle, accompanied by a mentality characteristic of the Greatest, Silent, and Baby boomer generations. In the comic, pluggers are portrayed in the form of anthropomorphic animals, most often a plump bear, dog, chicken, or rhinoceros, sometimes a kangaroo or a cat.

== Publication history ==
Editorial cartoonist Gary Brookins took over in 1997, three years prior to creator Jeff MacNelly's death from lymphoma in 2000. Brookins retired in 2020, and his assistant Rick McKee took over, still maintaining a similar style to MacNelly's originals.

Pluggers is syndicated by Tribune Content Agency in 60 newspapers, mostly in the Southern, Midwestern, Plains, and Rocky Mountain states.

== Characters ==
Most episodes of the comic focus on illustrating personality traits and aspects of the lifestyles of people who are identified as pluggers, and there are no continuing storylines. Consequently, the names and occupations of the anthropomorphic animal characters are rarely mentioned.

=== Recurring characters ===
- Andy Bear is a father of three who works as a foreman and estimator at a construction company. He is married to Sheila Roo.
- Sheila Roo is an aerobics instructor from Australia and the wife of Andy Bear.
- Carl Rhinowski, a rhinoceros construction worker.
- Earl Houndstooth, a dog, is married to Henrietta Beak.
- Henrietta Beak, a hen, works at Costco and is married to Earl Houndstooth.
- Doreen, who works at Costco with Henrietta.

=== Past characters ===
- Hamilton Ivory, an elephant and Andy's technophobic employer.
- Ginger, a canine café owner.
- Alan Litigator, a lawyer and alligator.
- Moose K. MacMoose III, a wealthy, retired moose.
- Dingo, a bear cub.
- DeeDee Doo, a hair stylist who, being a bird, actually has no hair of her own.
- Arthur Goldwyn, a salesman lion.
- Shayla, a kangaroo and Sheila Roo's daughter from a previous marriage.
- Merv Cooney, a raccoon and Andy's best friend and a tow-trucker.
- Debbie "Star" Lemonjelli, a black poodle and Hamilton's assistant.

== Criticism of strip ==
The blog Comics Curmudgeon often pokes fun at the comic and its implied populist stance, on one occasion referring to it as a "folksy bit of lower-middle-class reactionary agitprop."

In 1996 Dave Eggers from Salon.com criticized the strip for lionizing the working class despite being written by a committee of "current and former CEOs", and objected to "the self-important and vaguely jingoistic way the creators promote the cartoon".

Gary Brookins himself argues that "Pluggers are self-deprecating and have a healthy sense of humor about themselves. They represent the majority of us who don't live for the latest trend, who keep plugging along without fanfare and try to balance work, play and family life."
