= Jeff MacNelly =

American cartoonist (1947–2000)

- Born: Jeffrey Kenneth MacNelly; September 17, 1947; New York City
- Died: June 8, 2000 (aged 52); Baltimore, Maryland
- Occupation: Editorial cartoonist
- Notable work: Pluggers, Shoe
- Awards: Pulitzer Prize

Jeffrey Kenneth MacNelly (September 17, 1947 – June 8, 2000) was an American editorial cartoonist and the creator of the comic strip Shoe. After Shoe had been established in papers, MacNelly created the single-panel strip Pluggers. The Wall Street Journal wrote: "MacNelly's superb draftsmanship as well as his heightened sense of the ridiculous is in the vanguard of a new generation of American cartoonists."

== Early life ==
MacNelly was born in New York City in 1947 and grew up on Long Island. MacNelly's mother was a retired journalist. His father, C.L. MacNelly, ran an advertising firm, and was the publisher of the Saturday Evening Post from 1964 to 1968. MacNelly was educated in his teens at Phillips Academy in Massachusetts, where he was a class clown and decided to be an illustrator.

He graduated in 1965 and went to the University of North Carolina at Chapel Hill. He joined the literary society St. Anthony Hall and worked as a sports journalist and illustrator (specializing in satire) for The Daily Tar Heel. He considered himself to be a horrible sportswriter, but his illustrations for the paper were well beyond the ability of an average art student. His work for the college's newspaper led to work at the Chapel Hill Weekly. MacNelly dropped out just shy of getting his bachelor's degree in 1970.

In 1969, MacNelly was commissioned to paint a representation of the Carolina Inn, which became an "iconic" image representing the Chapel Hill campus hotel and appeared on promotional brochures and menus issued by the inn in the ensuing decades. The painting mysteriously disappeared in the 1980s and resurfaced in Massachusetts in 2008, when it was returned to the Carolina Inn and presented to the public for the first time at an official unveiling in January 2009, attended by MacNelly's son Danny.

== Career ==
MacNelly got a job at the Chapel Hill Weekly during his years at school in UNC. He worked there for the editor who became his mentor, Jim "Shu" Shumaker, who was also a professor at UNC-Chapel Hill. Shumaker's impression on the cartoonist was so profound that MacNelly created the comic strip Shoe after "Shu," and the strip's lead character is based upon him. MacNelly considered his two years at the Chapel Hill newspaper to be what led to his "break"; his cartoons were picked up by newspapers across the state.

By 1970, MacNelly had become such an accomplished artist that he was hired by Ross Mackenzie at The Richmond News Leader in Richmond, Virginia to be the newspaper's main illustrator and satirist. In less than two years, MacNelly won his first Pulitzer Prize in 1972, helping to put the small paper on the map.

At this time, MacNelly was courted by various newspaper syndicates and journals to work for them, but he turned them down, preferring the slower pace of southern culture. In 1974, MacNelly was settling into being syndicated through the Chicago Tribune, while making the South his home. MacNelly's editorial page editor at the Chicago Tribune, Jack Fuller, said in 1986 that MacNelly's editorial cartoons were "magic... I wish I could say just what combination of graphic mastery, writing skill and sheer perversity goes into Jeff's work. I can't, but when people say Jeff has a special perspective on the world, they are engaging in heroic understatement."

In 1977, he launched his first comic strip, Shoe, which was an immediate success. In 1981, he quit as editorial cartoonist at the News-Leader to focus on Shoe full-time, but found he needed to work in a newspaper office atmosphere to concentrate. In the 1980s, MacNelly moved to Chicago (to work for the Chicago Tribune) and eventually back to Virginia. Shoe was syndicated in 950 newspapers by 1986, with millions of readers. A line of stuffed animals based on the cartoon's characters was produced. MacNelly also illustrated a book written by former Senator Eugene McCarthy and columnist James Kilpatrick, A Political Bestiary- Viable Alternatives, Impressive Mandates, and Other Fables.

MacNelly's editorial cartoons often appeared in book collections. When MacNelly represented the Irish Republican Army as a leprechaun that was a rat in one of his Chicago Tribune syndicated editorial cartoons after the IRA blew up a bus filled with schoolchildren, protesters objecting to the cartoon's contents picketed outside the Boston Globe's offices for three weeks. One of his most reprinted cartoons featured Mikhail Gorbachev with a birthmark in the shape of Afghanistan. MacNelly believed that in order to draw and write editorial cartoons, an artist had to have an opinion on the news, so he watched television news to gauge what other Americans were seeing and read the columns of Hugh Sidey, George Will and Meg Greenfield.

MacNelly said: "Cartoons are really a negative art form. You never say anything nice. You're always criticizing and dumping on people." Some of his most frequent targets were Jimmy Carter and Gorbachev. MacNelly was present when Gerald Ford fell and hit his head on a tarmac on an overseas trip in 1976: "I was the only cartoonist to see that, to actually see it. And all I could think of was, 'Gee, I hope he didn't hurt his head.' Meanwhile, back in the States, all my colleagues were doing Jerry Ford-falling-down jokes, and Chevy Chase started an entire career on it. I never did one. And I was the only guy that was right there. I missed the whole story, the entire point of it and everything."

In 1988, the Dayton Daily News reported that a cartoonist for the Ohio Republican Party named Ed Wilson drew cartoons which were "strikingly similar" and "virtually the same" to MacNelly's. The party subsequently fired Wilson.

In 1992, MacNelly met Chris Cassatt, a computer expert and cartoonist who became his assistant. Cassatt helped him change the way he worked by adding digitalization to his mediums. In 1992, MacNelly hired Cassatt full-time, and they tele-commuted between Fishhawk Pass in Virginia and Cassatt's home in Aspen, Colorado. Also in 1993, on a suggestion from his wife Susie and long-time friend and Pulitzer Prize-winning photographer, David Kennerly, MacNelly launched his strip Pluggers.

== Later career and legacy ==
One of MacNelly's friends and colleagues at the Richmond Times-Dispatch, Gary Brookins, had assisted MacNelly in filling in doing finish work. Brookins was a fan of Pluggers and could replicate MacNelly's style. Exhausted after his son's death, MacNelly gave the strip to Brookins to take over in early 1997. Pluggers was produced by Brookins until 2020, after which it was handed over to Rick McKee; it is syndicated in more than 60 newspapers in the United States.

In the late 1990s, MacNelly began to also put more concentration into fine art painting and sculpture. He did a caricature of the Louisiana cartoonist Pap Dean. By 1999, he had almost finished passing the task of creating Shoe onto Cassatt, Susie MacNelly and Brookins. Then, in December 1999, MacNelly was diagnosed with lymphoma. He continued working in spite of his illness, producing Shoe and editorial cartoons and Dave Barry illustrations in his Johns Hopkins Hospital bed right up to the day he died, June 8, 2000.

MacNelly's legacy is continued through the work of Chris Cassatt, Gary Brookins, Susie MacNelly, his head writer Bill Linden and Doug Gamble. This team keeps alive Jeff MacNelly's work on Shoe and Dave Barry's illustrations, as well as museum shows, fine art sales, licensing and publishing.

== Awards and honors ==
MacNelly won his first Pulitzer Prize in 1972, a second Pulitzer in 1978, and a third Pulitzer in 1985.

He received a Reuben Award in 1978 and 1979.

MacNelly won "Outstanding Cartoonist of the Year" from the National Cartoonists Society in 1978 and 1979.

In 1977, he received the Golden Plate Award of the American Academy of Achievement.

MacNelly won the Thomas Nast Award in 1985. He also won a George Polk Award.

He was the first cartoonist inducted into the UNC School of Journalism Hall of Fame in 1985. He said at the time of his induction: "I'm afraid if my mother finds out, I'll be in big trouble. She thinks I'm running numbers in Baltimore."

== Personal life ==
MacNelly married his first wife, Rita Daniels, in 1970. His son Jake was born in 1972, followed by Danny in 1974. He divorced Rita in 1981. His second marriage, to Boo Goldstein, also ended in divorce. He married Scottie Perry in 1985, and had a son Matt in 1986. In 1989, MacNelly met his last wife, Susie Spekin. They married in Washington D.C. in 1990 and soon thereafter moved to Flint Hill, Rappahannock County, Virginia.

Jake died in a rock climbing accident on October 15, 1996.
