= Pokey the Penguin =

Comic strip

- Author(s): Steve Havelka, under the pen name "The Authors"
- Website: http://yellow5.com/pokey
- Current status/schedule: Updated sporadically
- Launch date: February 18, 1998 (archive)
- Genre(s): Comedy, Parody

Pokey the Penguin is an online comic strip created in 1998. It chronicles the adventures of a penguin named Pokey and a large cast of other characters. Pokey comics are drawn crudely and minimalistically, and they consist largely of a string of non-sequiturs and absurd journeys, with a token effort towards more traditional plots and continuity (such as the conflict with the Italians over arctic-circle candy) that tend to be established through oblique references to off-screen characters and non-events. Today, new comic strips appear sporadically, although formerly the site was updated daily.

== Content and style ==
Pokey lives in the Arctic, unlike most penguins, which live in the Southern Hemisphere. He is accompanied by several recurring characters, of which the "Little Girl" is the most commonly seen. His main antagonists are the Italians, whom Pokey suspects of intending to steal his Arctic Circle-Candy (which grows in the Arctic). The Italians are usually represented by a ship on the horizon flying the Italian flag; an actual Italian was seen for the first time in a comic posted in late February 2008. In the first strip, Pokey is described as an "educational children's cartoon".

Pokey's artistic style is deliberately crude, even childish. The artwork has rough pixelated edges, jagged lines, and few colors (the hallmarks of Microsoft Paint drawings), and characters are almost always copied and pasted after their first appearance. The comic has been described as resembling "the ramblings of a deranged child". Most minor characters are exact copies of Pokey—the various "Chicken" characters are not chickens, but ordinary penguins, and the "Bear" is merely a brown penguin; the "Dinosaur" a green penguin. The comic strips are filled with visible corrections: some words are crossed out, while images are occasionally scribbled over. Some words are left misspelled, such as "haggas".

Pokey the Penguin's lettering consists entirely of italicized capitals. The typeface is exclusively Courier, is italicized by shifting pixels of each successive horizontal row further to the left, and is never anti-aliased. Sentences often end without punctuation, or end with multiple exclamation marks or question marks, usually separated by spaces.

The strip's dialogue is surreal and often peppered with obscure allusions; illustrative quotes include "HERE ON RUM ISLAND WE DO NOT BELIEVE IN RUM!" and "IN MEAT-SPACE, MR. NUTTY, EVERYONE IS YOUR FRIEND! ! !" Most strips lack clear punch lines. The comic introduced the expression "Chicago-style", meaning "without pants".

Two animated Pokey adventures (which originally appeared in 2002) have been released into the "Hall of Whismy" (sic), which also suggests forthcoming availability of Pokey shirts and a book.

== The Authors ==
The comic does not name its creator, attributing each comic only to "THE AUTHORS". The author is in fact open source developer Steve Havelka of Portland, Oregon, whose identity became public during Pokey's early years. In discussions and message boards dedicated to Pokey, Havelka revealed that Pokey was originally intended as a parody of another MS Paint comic about a penguin. From 2018 to 2024, a second author, Natty Strange of Philadelphia, Pennsylvania, contributed at times to the comic's writing.

== Characters ==
There are numerous characters, including:

- Pokey the Penguin
- Mr. Nutty, an alcoholic British snowman and capitalist
- A young female penguin, variously identified as "Small Child" or "Little Girl," who is apparently Pokey's sister
- Skeptopotamus, a skeptic who says he is unrelated to the hippopotamus
- Headcheese, a French Canadian female penguin, with whom Pokey has something of a love/hate relationship
- Gustavo, a potato chip–shaped character whose long moustaches, named "Democracy" and "Stalin", can be moved individually like arms
- The devil, which looks like a red, horned penguin
- A boxing glove purportedly possessed by the devil
- The Italians, Pokey's enemies who want to steal his Arctic Circle-Candy

=== Minor characters ===
Pokey the Penguin frequently includes minor characters that appear in only one or two comics. Many look like exact copies of Pokey. Pokey often incorporates familiar characters from fiction such as Batman and Superman, both exact Pokey copies. Celebrities and politicians appear as well, including "Bobdole" (who looks exactly like Pokey) and Stephen Hawking (Pokey with a pointed wizard's hat). Variations on other characters appear sometimes, such as "Old Man Nutty" and "the Nostrapotamus." In one strip, Pokey's "son" appears, created as part of a science experiment.

== Pokey in other media ==
In late 2010, the first volume of Pokey the Penguin was released in book form. More have been released intermittently; there are now 12 volumes in all.

Pokey has been referenced twice in the Hitman series of video games: in Hitman: Contracts as an obscure, esoteric easter egg, and more directly in Hitman: Blood Money, where an overheard conversation between guards has one inviting the other to look at the comics on a computer.

Prodly the Puffin, a work of interactive fiction by Craig Timpany and Jim Crawford, was described by one reviewer as "sort of a parody and sort of an homage" to Pokey. It placed 35th out of 53 entries into the 2000 Interactive Fiction Competition.

A number of Web sites feature "bootleg" artwork (fan comics) and fan art dedicated to Pokey. See External Links below.
