= Yume Penguin Monogatari =

1991 video game

- Cover art
- Developer: Konami
- Publisher: Konami
- Composers: Katsuhiko Suzuki; Atsushi Fujio
- Engine: Proprietary
- Platforms: Family Computer, i-Revo
- Release: Famicom: JP: January 25, 1991; i-Revo: JP: September 15, 2006
- Genres: Platformer, shooter
- Mode: Single-player

Yume Penguin Monogatari (夢(ゆめ)ペンギン物語(ものがたり); "Story of the Dream Penguin") is a hybrid platform/shooter video game developed by Konami in 1991 for the Family Computer and 2006 for i-Revo.

== Summary ==
This game is particularly notable because of its highly peculiar plot and gameplay. The player takes the role of a penguin named Penta, who is getting dumped by his girlfriend Penko because he has become far too obese for her liking. Penta originally appeared in Antarctic Adventure and Penguin Adventure, and he is the father of "Pentarou" who appeared in the Parodius series. The game follows Penta's quest to win back his ex-girlfriend by losing weight via collecting diet drinks and avoiding enemies. Penko's new boyfriend, Ginji, is trying to block Penta's attempt by dispatching enemies sent to force-feed him back to obesity.

== Gameplay ==
This game is unique in that there is no life bar and it is not possible to lose lives due to being damaged; instead there is a "fitness meter" that displays Penta's current progress towards being in shape enough to win back Penko. A heart marks the weight goal for the current level, which is broken if the goal has not been reached, and repaired if it has been reached. If Penta does not reach that weight goal by the end of the level and within the time limit, he gets a break-up call from Penko and the player has the option to either restart the stage or return to the title screen. Getting hit by an enemy in the platforming stages will cause the timer to skip ten or more seconds if there is a significant amount of time remaining.

Diet drinks must be collected to lose weight. Initially as a fat penguin, Penta is slow-moving, cannot jump high or far, and has only a blubber attack, in which he jumps and presses his belly against the floor to damage enemies. While Penta is in the "Normal" scale in the weight meter he has the ability to kick, and while he is in the "Thin" scale he has the ability to shoot the word "PO" out of his mouth in a straight direction to the left or right, which has unlimited range. Losing weight also increases Penta's speed and jumping ability. Getting hit by a food item in any stage or an enemy in the shooter segments will cause Penta to regain some weight. Falling into water in the platforming stages will cause Penta to return to his fattest state.

Among the six total levels in the game, there are three platforming levels as well as three two-dimensional scrolling shooter stages. In both types, the concept remains the same: collect diet drinks, attack/avoid enemies, and finish within the time limit. The sixth level is a combination of the two gameplay elements, with the first half being a platforming stage. The second half of the sixth level contains the confrontation with Ginji, and is a behind-view shooting stage. At the conclusion of the game, Penta and Penko fly to a tropical island and everything initially appears to be idyllic. In a surprise ending, after munching on food for some time Penko herself becomes very overweight, and Penta slaps his head in disbelief. The game also has a second run that repeats the stages, and really ends the game.

== Release and reception ==
Reception

Review score
Publication	Score
Famitsu	6/10, 5/10, 7/10, 7/10

Yume Penguin Monogtari was released in Japan for the Family Computer on January 25, 1991.

== Legacy ==
Yume Penguin Monogatari is remembered, along with Konami's own Bio Miracle Bokutte Upa, as being a highly unusual game, especially in its handling of obesity, in that the game is making the distinction that being overweight is not a positive action. The game is also remembered for the appearance of a penguin who is most likely Pentarou, the star of several Konami classics. The game was never released in the United States.

Being a Japan-only release, the game was widely inaccessible until the rise of console emulation, and a fan translation of YPM was initially released in 1998 by Kalevan, with an update that was made the following year. A second fan-made translation of the game was released in 2003 by Vice Translations.

== See also ==
- Antarctic Adventure
- Binary Land, a game that Penta and Penko have the similar appearance to Gurin and Malon
