= Birds of Prey (Drake novel) =

Historical science fiction novel by David Drake

- First edition cover
- Author: David Drake
- Cover artist: Michael Whelan
- Language: English
- Genre: Science fiction, Alternate history
- Publisher: Baen Books
- Publication date: August 23, 1984
- Publication place: United States
- Media type: Print (Hardcover, Paperback)
- Pages: 348 pp (first edition, paperback)
- ISBN: 0-671-55912-5 (first edition, paperback)
- OCLC: 10606305
- Dewey Decimal: 813/.54 19
- LC Class: PS3554.R196 B5 1984

Birds of Prey is a novel by science fiction / fantasy author David Drake, first published in 1984. It is related as a historical novel set in the Late Roman Empire, in the second half of the Third Century. There is a science-fictional twist to the story, starting with hints of a time warp on the very first page and slowly revealing to the reader—and the protagonist—what is really going on behind the scenes. The story is told in a very vivid style, suggestive of cinematography.

== Plot summary ==
The novel relates an episode in the life of Aulus Perennius, a middle-aged operative of the Bureau of Imperial Affairs, an agency which has evolved into an intelligence service over the life of the Empire. He is accompanied by his protégé Gaius, a dashing young cavalry officer with an unfortunate tendency to act without thinking, and an odd figure named Calvus, tall, slim, bald, incredibly strong, and rather clueless. (The story hints that Gaius is Aulus' biological son, but never makes a clear statement on the matter.)

At the beginning of the story Aulus' own mentor, head of the Bureau of Imperial Affairs, has summoned him back to Rome on a matter urgent enough to pull him out of a deep-cover operation in Palmyra just as it was coming to its critical phase. (This scene is a bit reminiscent of James Bond being summoned by his own boss for a new assignment). At the direct behest of the emperor the Bureau has been ordered to provide Calvus with any sort of support requested, and Calvus has asked only for the services of the Bureau's best agent—requesting Aulus by name.

Invoking the authority of the Bureau, Aulus orders an ancient Liburnian out of dry-dock storage to be outfitted for a trip to Cilicia in southern Anatolia, technically a part of the Roman Empire but at that time under the control of Odenath, to provide some unspecified service for Calvus. En route they are beset by pirates and other parties; the story of the journey takes up the greater part of the book. (In a sea battle with pirates, the Romans face a desperate plight due to the authorities in Rome having failed to provide an adequate Marine contingent; capture by brutal Gothic and Herulian raiders; the apparent warm hospitality offered by an isolated Christian community turns out to mask a virulently bloodthirsty, fanatic sect; a giant, predatory Allosaurus, displaced from the distant past, rampages in the countryside...)

Calvus, though taken for a male, is actually a female (of sorts) sent back from the far distant future to destroy the seed creche or "brood chamber" of monstrous aliens—intelligent social insects—who, by her time, have multiplied into billions, emerged from their underground creches, and are in the process of destroying the human race. As a desperate measure a set of six mutually telepathic sisters, including Calvus, are specially bred to be sent on the mission together. (The book hints that the future human race has evolved to be somewhat different from ourselves, and that the six sterile sisters—akin to worker ants or bees—are uncommon only in their preparation for this particular mission; there is a suggestion that, waging an existential struggle against social insects, future humanity was driven to emulate these enemies...)

Calvus is the only one of the siblings to arrive at the proper time in the past; there are strong hints that the presence of a handful of extinct creatures such as dinosaurs and sabre-toothed cats in Aulus' time are a side effect of the unintentional displacement of the other siblings into the far distant past.

The time-travel technology did not allow Calvus to take any weapons or other gadgets along, so she herself serves as the weapon. She has a limited ability to influence the thoughts of humans other than her sisters—which is how she induced the emperor to issue orders for the Bureau's cooperation—and at the end of the story she destroys the creche by self-destructing as a nuclear or thermal bomb. Before then, through her association with Aulus and separation from her sisters, she learns to experience her humanity almost in the way ordinary humans do.

== Characters ==
- Aulus Perennius: a middle-aged Roman spy, ace agent of the Bureau of Imperial Affairs
- Gaius: a young cavalry officer, Perennius' protégé, and of whom a startling revelation is made at the book's very end
- Marcus Optatious Navigatus: Director of the Bureau of Imperial Affairs, like his agent totally dedicated to the crumbling Empire
- Calvus: the mysterious man who initiates the perilous mission, and who turns out to be female
- Sestius: a Roman centurion, brave and dedicated companion on a dangerous quest—though he planned to eventually desert
- Sabellia: a fierce, knife-carrying Gallic woman, able to make men who assault her deeply regret their act
- Father Ramphion: seemingly a paragon of Christian virtue, but those who learn the truth about him usually do not survive to tell the tale
- Julia: a Seeress, Aulus' long-lost beloved, who might have died to save him, and on whom he might have begotten a son he never knew
- The Guardians: six highly intelligent insects, bearing energy weapons and constituting a mortal threat to humanity

== Release details ==
- 1984, USA, Baen Books/Pocket Books (ISBN 0-671-55912-5), Pub date ? August 1984, paperback (First edition)
- 1984, UK, Simon & Schuster (ISBN 0-671-55909-5), Pub date ? August 1984, hardback
- 1991, USA, Tor Books (ISBN 0-8125-3612-6), Pub date ? April 1991, paperback
- 1991, USA, Tom Doherty Assoc (ISBN 0-8125-1356-8), Pub date ? April 1991, paperback
- 1999, USA, Baen Books (ISBN 0-671-57790-5), Pub date ? February 1999, paperback
