= Swoop (Philadelphia Eagles) =

Mascot for the NFL's Philadelphia Eagles

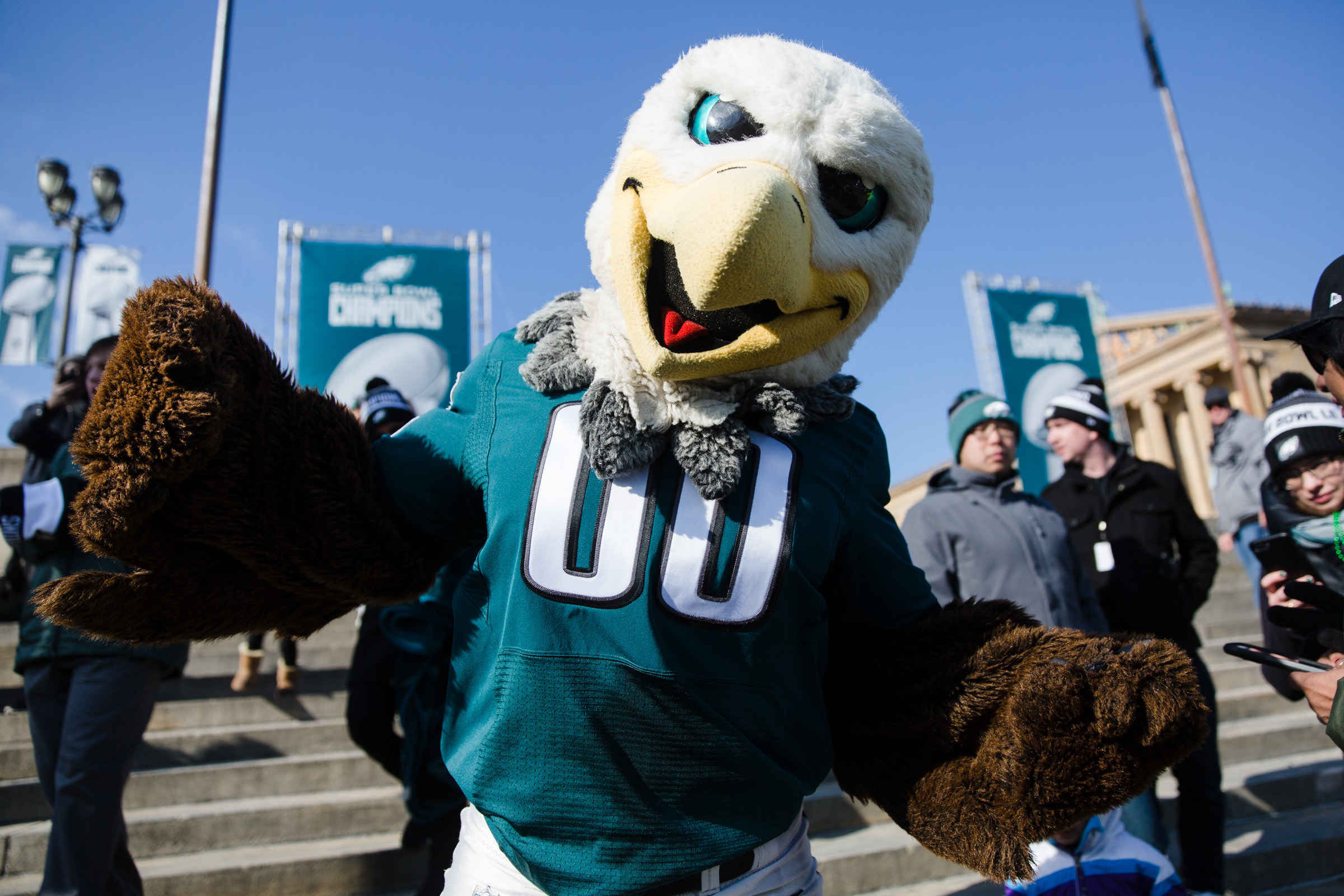
- Swoop at the Super Bowl LII Victory Parade in 2018
- Team: Philadelphia Eagles
- Conference: National Football Conference
- First seen: 1994
- Website: Swoop website

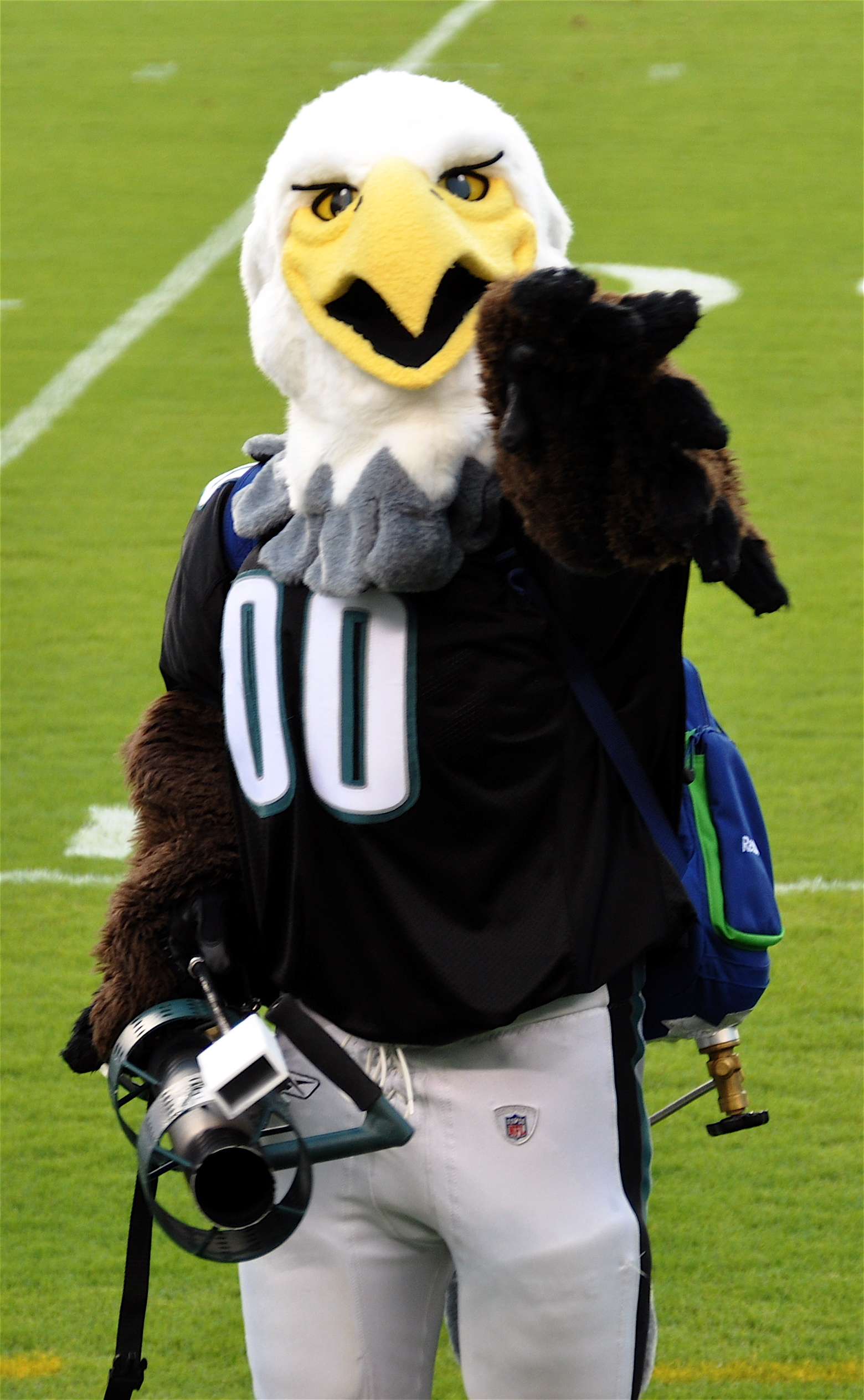
Swoop on the gridiron in 2009

Swoop is the mascot for the American professional football team the Philadelphia Eagles. He is a Bald eagle wearing a sports jersey of the Philadelphia Eagles.

== Fictional biography ==
Hatched in the quiet Eagles Forest of Neshaminy State Park, Swoop was a bald eagle with poor eyesight and strength, but a "strong and true" heart. The bird gained a humanoid appearance and size after a Philadelphia Eagles fan gave him a jersey that increased his strength, and his vision grew to match his heart. Hoping to help others, he became an overseer of the Eagles community.

== Appearances ==
During the NFL regular season, Swoop regularly appears as an animated character in the weekly Eagles Kids' Club television show. During the Emmy-award-winning show's run from 2005–2010, the animated version of Swoop has been serving as a host of this show.

Swoop is best known for his stunts during the Philadelphia Eagles Football Games such as zip lining across Lincoln Financial Field parachuting into the stadium. He has been seen sporting a pink wig for breast cancer awareness.

Swoop made a cameo appearance in an NFL Shop commercial where a thief disguised as a kangaroo mascot tried to steal Philadelphia Eagles jerseys from the locker room after a game. Swoop walks into the locker room and the kangaroo tries to escape, but the security guards catch it. Swoop also made a cameo appearance in the 1994 comedy film Ace Ventura: Pet Detective, where Ventura beats the mascot after the latter shooed away an albino pigeon.
