= DigitalCurriculum =

DigitalCurriculum was the first educational video-on-demand system and remains the standard for interactive streaming multimedia libraries. An early SaaS model, DigitalCurriculum was conceived and designed in 1997 and produced and released in 1999, by AIMS Multimedia's David S. Sherman, Ph. D., co-president of AIMS MULTIMEDIA, and software architect Richard Williams. The service drew from and incorporated the AIMS Multimedia educational video library, executive producer Mike Wright and associate producer Pat Davies. Also heavily involved in the design team were Hillary Broadwater, Elizabeth von Schoff, and Aram Iskenderian. The video component in DigitalCurriculum included over $300 million in educational productions — programs that received more than 1,000 awards worldwide — including the prestigious Emmy, Oscar, Peabody and Parents’ Choice awards. These premier titles came from hundreds of world-renowned producers and distributors including: Scholastic/Weston Woods, ABC, Paramount, TV Ontario, TEAMS Distance Learning, Channel One and the National Film Board of Canada.

DigitalCurriculum was a curriculum-on-demand teaching and learning system that fully integrated full-length educational videos, key concept video clips, still images, Encyclopædia Britannica content, teacher guides, lesson plans, and interactive online assessments and assignments into a comprehensive learning tool for teachers, students, and administrators with complete record-keeping and an internal messaging service. At the time of its acquisition in 2004 by Discovery Communications, DigitalCurriculum had over 100,000 educational multimedia components for every K-12 subject, state and national framework correlations, multiple bit-rate encoding for school and home use, simple incorporation of local content, and a paid subscriber base of more than 20 million teachers, librarians, administrators, and students.

DigitalCurriculum is of particular historical interest as it was a SaaS pioneer and one of the first video on demand services. It used a revolutionary multiple bitrate encoding that allowed video and audio streaming by users with shared DSL fractional T-1 internet connectivity; it even allowed streaming at 56 kbit/s dial-up modems.

DigitalCurriculum was described as innovative and visionary; its design, features and functionality having been copied and incorporated by virtually all educational media companies since its initial release back in 1998–1999 and its various iterations, culminating in v.5.0 in 2004.
