= Shoe (comic strip) =

American comic strip created by artist Jeff MacNelly

- Shoe logo
- Author: Jeff MacNelly (1977–2000); Chris Cassatt, Gary Brookins, Ben Lansing, Susie MacNelly
- Website: http://shoecomics.com
- Current status/schedule: Daily & Sunday
- Launch date: September 13, 1977
- Syndicate(s): Tribune Media Services (1977–August 2008); King Features (2008–present)
- Genre: Humor

Shoe is an American comic strip about a motley crew of newspapermen, all of whom are birds. It was written and drawn by its creator, cartoonist Jeff MacNelly, from September 13, 1977, until his death in 2000. MacNelly's last strip was dated July 9, 2000; it has since been continued by Chris Cassatt, Gary Brookins, Ben Lansing, and Susie MacNelly (Jeff's widow).

Shoe had its own monthly comic book in Norway for a six issues in 1987 under the name "Sjur", which consisted of reprints from newspapers. In 1989, Shoe was published again in Norway, under the name "Krax", appearing as an extra-feature in the Calvin and Hobbes magazine.

The strip won MacNelly the National Cartoonists Society's Reuben Award for the year 1979.

== Characters and setting ==
Shoe deals with the day-to-day foibles of a group of newspaper employees and their families, all of whom are portrayed as anthropomorphized birds, in the fictional locale of Treetops, East Virginia. During hunting season, "hunting dogs" (hounds with rifles, a visual pun on the sharp-sniffing canines that hunters use to track game) are occasionally featured.

Characters
Species
Description
P. Martin "Shoe" Shoemaker
purple martin
The cigar-smoking editor of The Treetops Tattler-Tribune, whose difficulties with his various ex-wives is legendary. He is the boss of Cosmo and Loon with a very similar management style to Mr. Dithers in the comic series Blondie. He was patterned after Jim Shumaker whom MacNelly worked for at the Chapel Hill (NC) Weekly.
Prof. Cosmo Fishhawk (usually called the "Perfessor")
osprey

The overeducated but underachieving osprey columnist whose computer expertise is almost as poor as his understanding of women. He is always seen wearing a tweed blazer and striped necktie, and his trademark desk is always overflowing with a very tall stack of papers, extending beyond the frame. Although the title of the strip is Shoe, Cosmo is arguably the main character, as the majority of the strips revolve around his life. He is sometimes shown driving a 1959 DeSoto.

Roz Specklehen
unknown

Waitress at, and likely owner of the local diner (Roz's Roost) where many of the characters gather.

Skyler
skylark

An overeducated but underachieving nephew whom Cosmo is raising. A recurring gag has him repeatedly attend Marine recruit training by mistake during the summer, then write a series of letters to Uncle Cosmo.

Sen. Batson D. Belfry
unknown

An evasive beltway blowhard, seemingly patterned after Tip O'Neill and Ted Kennedy, and whose name is a pun of "bats in the belfry".

Irving "Irv" Seagull
gull

A local repairman. A pun on the service-station chain Irving Oil Corporation.

Loon
loon

A mail and newspaper carrier whose aeronautic skills are the subject of recurring jokes, based on former Vietnam POW Navy pilot Paul Galanti.

Wiz
merlin

The "Merlin of motherboards," he appears as a wizard in a pointed hat and star-covered robe, carrying a magic wand. He is often called in by The Perfessor to fix his office computer. ("Okay, first, let's get your fist out of the computer screen.")

Muffy Hollandaise
unknown

Former intern at The Treetops Tattler-Tribune; reintroduced in 2024 (after many, many years) as Treetops Channel 5 news anchor.

Biz
unknown
A nonagenarian bird often encountered at Roz's Roost complaining of age-related foibles.
Mort
vulture
Operator of Mort's Mortuary, the local funeral home.
Madame ZooDoo
unknown
Local crystal ball-gazing psychic.
Older characters no longer seen
Bumpkins
stork(?)

The "Perfessor"'s manservant/butler, acquired in an inheritance.

== Collections and reprints ==
(All titles by Jeff MacNelly)

- The Very First Shoe Book (1978) Avon
- The Other Shoe (1980) Avon
- Shoe Extra (1980) Yaffa Publishing (Australia)
- The New Shoe (1981) Avon
- On with the Shoe! (1982) Holt, Rinehart & Winston
- A Shoe for All Seasons (1983) HRW
- The Shoe Must Go On (1984) HRW
- The Greatest Shoe on Earth (1985) HRW
- One Shoe Fits All (1986) HRW
- How Many Next Years Do You Get in Baseball?: Shoe Goes to Wrigley Field (1988) Bonus Books
- Too Old for Summer Camp and Too Young to Retire (1988) St. Martin's Press
- A Cigar Means Never Having to Say You're Sorry (1989) St. Martin's Press
- Shake the Hand, Bite the Taco (1990) St. Martin's Press
- Apply a Little Hardware to the Software (1991) Quark Prods.
- The Athletic Shoe (1991) St. Martin's Press
- Out to Lunch: A Brand New Shoe (1993) Tribune Publishing
- New Shoes (1994) Contemporary Books
- Play Ball! All I Ever Learned I Forgot by the Third Inning (1999) Triumph
- From Couch Potato to Mouse Potato: Success Tips for the Technically Impaired (1978) Triumph
- 27 Years of Shoe: World Ends at Ten, Details at Eleven (2004) Andrews McMeel
