= 1968 in literature =

This article contains information about the literary events and publications of 1968.

== Events ==
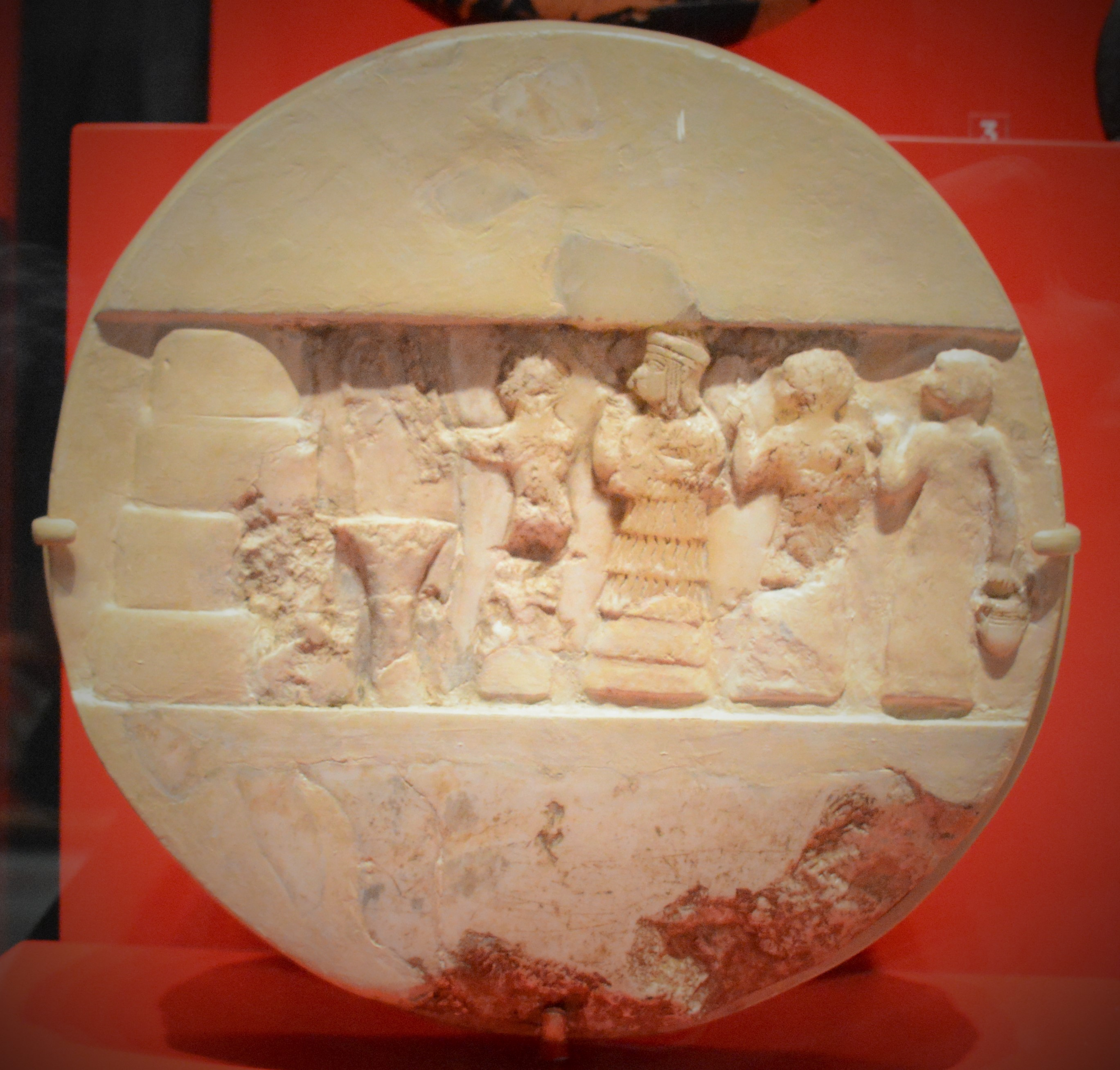
The Disk of Enheduanna, discovered by Leonard Woolley depicts the high priestess standing in worship as what has been interpreted as a nude male figure pours a libation

- January 1 – Cecil Day-Lewis is announced as the new Poet Laureate of the United Kingdom.
- April – The American edition of Andrew Garve's thriller The Long Short Cut becomes the first book printed completely by electronically-controlled typesetting (electronic composition).
- May – The Action Theater in Munich is disbanded after its building is wrecked by one of its founders, jealous of director Rainer Werner Fassbinder's growing power in the group.
- June 17 – Tom Stoppard's parodic comedy The Real Inspector Hound opens at the Criterion Theatre in London's West End, starring Richard Briers and Ronnie Barker.
- July 28 – Last Exit to Brooklyn is cleared of obscenity in the English appeal court. John Mortimer appears for the defence.
- September 26 – Theatres Act 1968 (royal assent July 26) ends censorship of the theatre in the United Kingdom.
- November – The English novelist Anthony Burgess and his new wife Liana settle in Lija on Malta.
- unknown dates
  - The first translations and book-length discussion of the Sumerian high priestess Enheduanna's work is published.
  - Dean R. Koontz's first novel, Star Quest, is published by Ace Books in the United States.
  - The Arvon Foundation is established by young poets John Fairfax and John Moat in the UK to promote creative writing.

== New books ==
=== Fiction ===
- Ayi Kwei Armah – The Beautyful Ones Are Not Yet Born
- Elizabeth Bowen – Eva Trout
- Anthony Burgess – Enderby Outside
- Victor Canning – The Melting Man
- Agatha Christie - By the Pricking of My Thumbs
- Cormac McCarthy – Outer Dark
- Per Anders Fogelström – Stad i världen
- Michael Innes – Appleby at Allington
- John Irving – Setting Free the Bears
- Halldór Laxness – Kristnihald undir jökli (Christianity under the Glacier)
- John le Carré – A Small Town in Germany
- Helen MacInnes – The Salzburg Connection
- Ngaio Marsh – Clutch of Constables
- N. Scott Momaday – House Made of Dawn
- Brian Moore – I Am Mary Dunne
- Fănuș Neagu – Îngerul a strigat ("The Angel Has Shouted")
- Anthony Powell – The Military Philosophers
- Giorgio Scerbanenco – I ragazzi del massacro
- Robert Silverberg – The Masks of Time
- Aleksandr Solzhenitsyn – Cancer Ward (Russian: Раковый корпус, Rakovy Korpus)
- Muriel Spark – The Public Image

=== Children and young people ===
- Lloyd Alexander – The High King
- Joan Aiken – The Whispering Mountain
- Peter S. Beagle - The Last Unicorn
- Don Freeman – Corduroy
- Russell Hoban – The Mouse and His Child
- Ted Hughes – The Iron Man
- Judith Kerr – The Tiger Who Came to Tea
- Alexander Key – Escape to Witch Mountain
- David McKee – Elmer the Patchwork Elephant
- Robert C. O'Brien – The Silver Crown
- Jill Tomlinson – The Owl Who Was Afraid of the Dark
- Paul Zindel – The Pigman (first in The Pigman trilogy)

=== Drama ===
- Arthur Miller - The Price
- Michel Tremblay – Les Belles-Sœurs

=== Non-fiction ===
- Eldridge Cleaver – Soul on Ice
- Joan Didion – Slouching Towards Bethlehem
- Esther Hautzig – The Endless Steppe (autobiography)
- Bevis Hillier – Art Deco of the 20s and 30s
- Pauline Kael – Kiss Kiss Bang Bang
- Gershon Legman – Rationale of the Dirty Joke
- Peter Maas – The Valachi Papers
- Erich von Däniken – Chariots of the Gods? (Erinnerungen an die Zukunft)
- Gwyn Thomas – A Few Selected Exits
- James D. Watson – The Double Helix

== Births ==
- March 28 – Iris Chang, American historian and journalist (died 2004)
- July 7 – Jeff VanderMeer, American writer and editor
- October 7 – Rachel Kushner, American writer
- unknown dates
  - Brock Clarke, American writer
  - Fatou Diome, French-Senegalese writer
  - K. V. Johansen, Canadian children's author
  - Park Min-gyu, South Korean writer

== Deaths ==
- January 21 – Will Lang, Jr., American journalist (born 1914)
- March 23 – Edwin O'Connor, American journalist, novelist, and radio commentator (born 1918)
- April 4 - Muhammad Taha al-Huwayzi, Iranian-Iraqi Ja'fari jurist, religious teacher and poet (born 1889)
- April 16 – Edna Ferber, American novelist, short story writer and playwright (born 1885)
- April 27 – Vasily Azhayev, Soviet writer (born 1915)
- April 29 – Anthony Boucher, American author, critic, and editor (born 1911)
- May 1 – Sir Harold Nicolson, British biographer (born 1886)
- May 30 – Constantin S. Nicolăescu-Plopșor, Romanian anthropologist, ethnographer and children's writer (born 1900)
- May 31 – Abel Bonnard, French poet, novelist and politician (born 1883)
- June 1 – Helen Keller, deaf-blind American author, activist and lecturer (born 1880)
- August 21 - Germaine Guèvremont, Canadian writer (born 1893)
- November 17 – Mervyn Peake, English novelist (dementia, born 1911)
- November 25 – Upton Sinclair, American novelist and politician (born 1878)
- November 28 – Enid Blyton, English author and poet (born 1897)
- December 5 – Anna Kavan, British novelist, short story writer and painter (born 1901)
- December 20 – John Steinbeck, American novelist (congestive heart failure, born 1902)
- December 24 – D. Gwenallt Jones, Welsh poet (born 1899)

== Awards ==
- Friedenspreis des Deutschen Buchhandels: Léopold Sédar Senghor
- Hugo Award for Best Novella: Riders of the Purple Wage by Philip José Farmer / Weyr Search by Anne McCaffrey

== Sources ==
- Hahn, Daniel (2015). The Oxford Companion to Children's Literature (2nd ed.). Oxford. University Press. ISBN 9780198715542.
- Winter, Irene (2009). "Women In Public: The Disk Of Enheduanna, The Beginning Of The Office Of En-Priestess, And The Weight Of Visual Evidence". In Winter, Irene (ed.). On Art in the Ancient Near East Volume II: From the Third Millennium BCE. BRILL. pp. 65–84. ISBN 978-90-474-2845-9.
