= Rats of NIMH =

Series of children's novels

The Rats of NIMH is a trilogy of children's books, the first one by Robert C. O'Brien, and the second and third by his daughter Jane Leslie Conly. They tell the story of a society of rats rendered intelligent by scientific experimentation.

The books are:

1. Mrs. Frisby and the Rats of NIMH (1971), by Robert C. O'Brien, winner of the Newbery Medal
2. Racso and the Rats of NIMH (1986), by Jane Leslie Conly
3. R-T, Margaret, and the Rats of NIMH (1990), by Jane Leslie Conly

In 1982, Mrs. Frisby and the Rats of NIMH became the basis for the animated film The Secret of NIMH, the directorial debut of Don Bluth. In 1998, a direct-to-video sequel to the film called The Secret of NIMH 2: Timmy to the Rescue was released. The sequel has no connection to Racso and the Rats of NIMH and was met with poor reception.

A live-action/animated remake was reported to be in development; James Madigan was attached to direct.

== See also ==
- Behavioral sink
