= Z for Zachariah =

1974 novel by Robert C. O'Brien

- First edition
- Author: Robert C. O'Brien
- Cover artist: Larry Rostant
- Language: English
- Genre: Science fiction
- Published: 1974 (G K Hall)
- Publication place: United States
- Media type: Hardback, paperback, e-book
- Pages: 192 (276 in hardback version)
- ISBN: 978-1-4169-3921-4 (paperback)

Z for Zachariah is a post-apocalyptic science fiction novel by American writer Robert C. O'Brien, which was published posthumously in 1974. The name Robert C. O'Brien was the pen name used by Robert Leslie Conly. After the author's death in March 1973, his wife Sally M. Conly and daughter Jane Leslie Conly completed the work, guided by his notes. Set in the continental territory of the United States, it is written from the first-person perspective as the diary of sixteen-year-old Ann Burden. Burden has survived nuclear war and nerve gas by living in a small valley with an isolated microclimate.

According to Sally Conly in summer 1972, Z for Zachariah would be her husband's "second adult novel" following the months-old science fiction thriller A Report from Group 17. O'Brien had previously established himself as a children's writer with novels The Silver Crown (1968) and Mrs. Frisby and the Rats of NIMH (1971). In the event, Z for Zachariah was a runner-up for the 1976 Jane Addams Children's Book Award and it won the Edgar Award for best mystery fiction in the juvenile category.

== Plot summary ==
Ann Burden is a teenage girl who believes she is the last survivor of a nuclear war. Since her family's disappearance on a search expedition, she has lived alone on her farm in a small valley spared from radiation poisoning. A year after the war, a stranger in a radiation-proof suit approaches her valley. Afraid he might be dangerous, Ann hides in a cave and does not warn the man when he mistakenly bathes in a radioactive stream. When he falls ill, her fear of being alone forever leads her to reveal herself to help him. She discovers that the stranger is John Loomis, a chemist who helped design a prototype radiation-proof "safe-suit" at an underground lab near Ithaca, New York. Ann moves him into her house and fantasizes about eventually marrying him.

Loomis becomes delirious, with traumatic flashbacks to the underground lab. He talks of how he shot his coworker, Edward, who tried to take the safe-suit to find his family. Though troubled by this revelation, Ann nurses him through his illness and keeps secret her knowledge of Edward's death. As Loomis recovers, Ann is taken aback when he forbids her to touch the safe-suit and begins giving her orders on farming and managing resources. His explanation that they have to plan "as if this valley is the whole world and we are starting a colony," makes her uneasy. Her uneasiness increases when she asks if he was ever married, and he grabs her hand roughly, rebuking her when she accidentally hits him while trying to regain her balance. One night soon afterwards, she is awakened by her dog Faro, only to hear Loomis in her room. When he attempts to rape her, she fights back, hitting him in the neck, and flees to the cave again.

Later, Ann approaches Loomis and proposes sharing the valley and farm work but living apart. He professes surprise when she tells him she won't live with him anymore and asks why, as if he has no idea. Ann remembers that he acted the same after he had grabbed her hand, "as if nothing had happened, or as if he had forgotten it." She refuses to justify her choice to him, to tell him where she is living, or to come back to live with him. Loomis answers that he has no choice but to accept her proposal, though he hopes she will reconsider and "act more like an adult and less like a schoolgirl". Though the arrangement is "unnatural and uneasy," and Ann worries about surviving winter, she sticks by her decision and wishes Loomis had never come. Loomis locks the store, cutting off her supplies. When she approaches him for the key, Loomis shoots her in the ankle. Ann flees, realizing that he had not shot to kill, only to lame her to make her easy to capture. Loomis uses her dog, Faro, to track her to the cave, where he burns her belongings, though Ann escapes. Ann's ankle wound becomes infected. As she recovers, she has feverish dreams of another valley where children wait for her to teach them. Ann comes to believe the dreams may be true and Loomis is insane, so she plans to steal the safe-suit and find her dream valley. Moreover, she decides to kill Faro to prevent Loomis from tracking her, though she is later unable to do so. However, Faro is fatally poisoned swimming across the dead creek to her.

Ann finally acts on her plan. She lures Loomis from the house with a note offering to talk if he meets her unarmed, then steals the safe-suit and waits for Loomis to arrive. When he does, she reveals her knowledge of Edward's murder, which shocks Loomis enough to stop him from shooting her. He begs her not to leave him alone. Ann tells him she will send people to him if she finds any, goes south, and leaves. Loomis's last action is to call out that he once saw birds circling to the west. Ann listens and walks west into the irradiated zone, hoping to see a green horizon.

== Title ==
As a child, Ann had owned a Biblical ABC book which mentioned the prophet Zachariah. She remembers thinking that if Adam (who was used for the letter "A") was the first man on earth, Zachariah (who represented the letter "Z") must be the last, and likens this to her status as the last survivor of the war.

== Setting ==
The story's events are set almost entirely in Burden Valley, a small and remote valley somewhere in the USA. It was named after the protagonist's ancestors, who were its first settlers and built a farm in the northern end. The only other inhabitants were the Kleins, a couple who owned the store and mainly did business with Amish farmers to the south.

The valley is approximately 4 miles long, from Burden Hill in the north to an S-shaped pass in the south called "the gap". The largest of its two streams, Burden Creek, is radioactive because its source is outside the valley. It runs parallel to the road from north to south and exits the valley through the gap. A smaller stream originates from a deep spring on an eastern hillside and feeds a small lake with fish that provide a food source for Ann. The stream then meanders south and joins Burden Creek. Much of the valley is made up of woodlands.

Ann initially thinks the animals in the Valley are probably the last of their species; however, at the end of the book Loomis reveals he has seen birds flying in the distance west of the valley, which implies other life as well. There are rabbits and squirrels in the valley. There are also some crows, which Ann believes survived because only they had the "sense" to stay in the valley, while other birds migrated. There are two cows, a bull calf, and chickens on Ann's farm. Finally, there is the dog, Faro, who belonged to Ann's cousin David.

The most important feature of the valley is that it is somehow separated from the surrounding atmosphere and has its own weather system. Loomis calls it a meteorological enclave created by an inversion (i.e., air only rising, not falling), but he views its existence as so unlikely that it is only a theoretical possibility.

== Major themes ==
Seeing the story as a conflict between an innocent girl and a domineering male scientist bent on controlling the valley, reviewers have found themes such as the destructiveness of science (at least when it is separated from conscience), the corrupting effect of the desire for power, and the moral value of individual freedom. Ann's sensitivity and love of nature are viewed as contrasting with Loomis' callous reasoning and selfish compulsion to take control. Writing for The Spectator in April 1975, Peter Ackroyd concludes that "science turns paradise sour." Reviews the same year in The Junior Bookshelf and Times Literary Supplement described Ann as an unwilling Eve who "finally refuses to begin the whole story over again." Another major theme of this book is survival, because the whole story is about surviving after a nuclear holocaust.

== Adaptations ==
Soon after the book was published it was serialized in the UK in the teenage magazine Jackie.

In February 1984, the BBC presented a film adaptation for its Play for Today series in which the setting was changed from America to Wales. Pippa Hinchley and Anthony Andrews play Ann and Loomis.<

Z for Zachariah, a 2015 film adaptation of the novel premiered in January 2015 with financing from Creative Artists Agency (CAA) and Material Pictures. Eschewing the central Adam/Eve theme and its deconstruction of abusive and controlling relationships, it adds a third character and involves a love triangle. It stars Margot Robbie, Chiwetel Ejiofor, and Chris Pine. Craig Zobel directs from an adapted script by Nissar Modi. Filming took place on New Zealand's Banks Peninsula and in the small former coal mining town of Welch, West Virginia.
