= John B. Calhoun =

American ethologist and behavioral researcher (1917-1995)

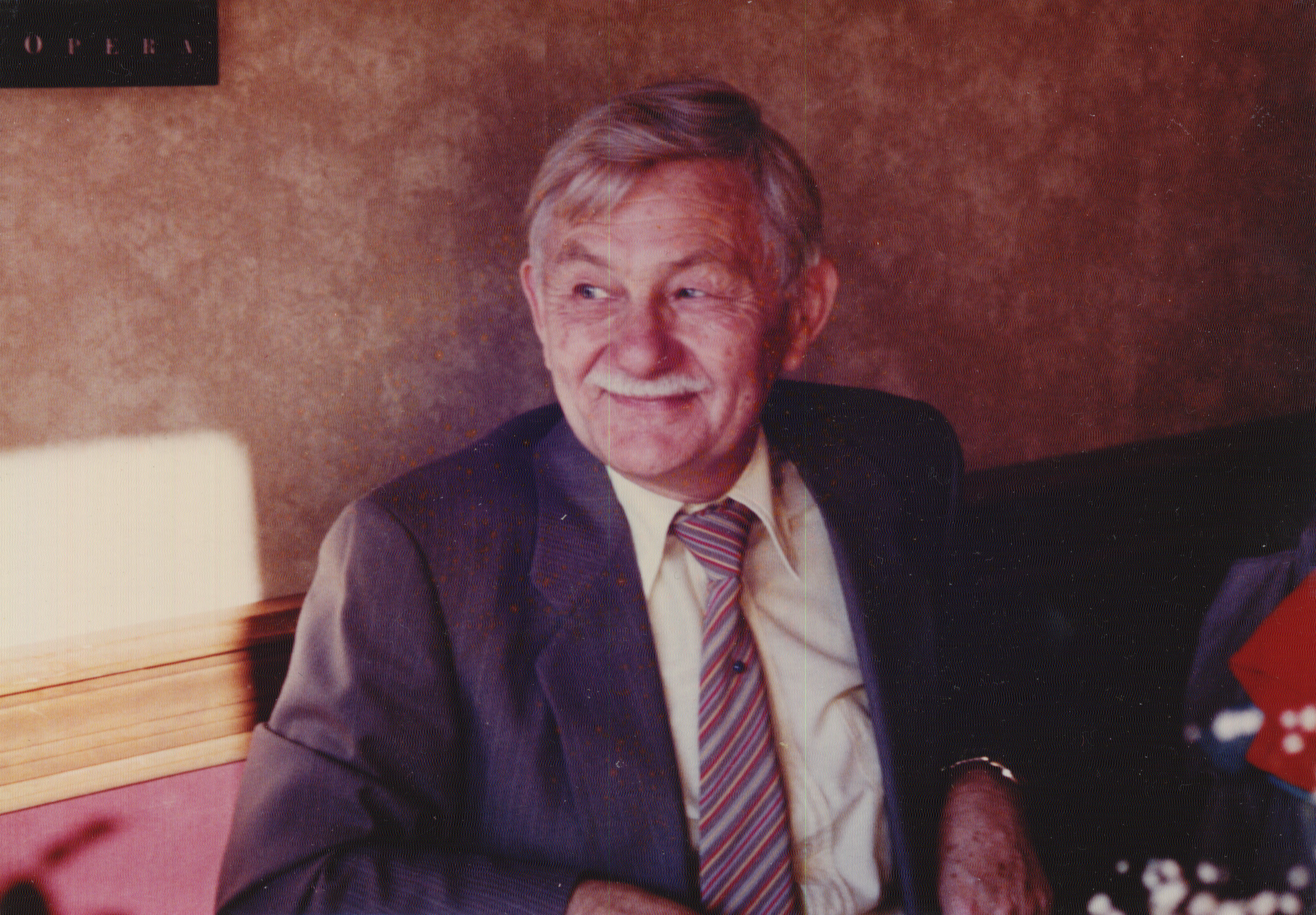
- Calhoun in 1986
- Born: John Bumpass Calhoun; May 11, 1917; Elkton, Tennessee, U.S.
- Died: September 7, 1995 (aged 78)
- Education: University of Virginia (BS); Northwestern University (MS, PhD)
- Occupation: Ethologist
- Known for: Behavioral sink theory

John Bumpass Calhoun (/kælˈhuːn/; May 11, 1917 – September 7, 1995) was an American ethologist and behavioral researcher noted for his studies of population density and its effects on behavior. He claimed that his observations of the bleak effects of overpopulation on rodents were a grim preview for the future of the human race. During his studies, Calhoun coined the terms "behavioral sink" to describe aberrant behaviors in overcrowded situations, and "beautiful ones" to characterize passive individuals who withdraw from all social interaction under extreme population density.

Calhoun's work gained worldwide recognition. He spoke at international conferences and his opinion was sought by groups as diverse as NASA and the District of Columbia's panel on overcrowding in local jails. His rat and mouse studies were a basis for the development of Edward T. Hall's ideas on proxemics. Calhoun's seminal 1962 Scientific American article on "Population Density and Social Pathology" fueled fears of the dystopian effects of human overpopulation, which Paul Ehrlich predicted in his 1968 bestseller The Population Bomb.

== Early life and education ==
John Calhoun was born May 11, 1917, in the tiny rural town of Elkton, Tennessee. His parents were James Calhoun, a high school principal who rose through the ranks of the Tennessee Department of Education; and Fern Madole Calhoun, a kindergarten teacher. John had three siblings: an older sister, Polly; and two younger brothers, Billy and Dan. When John was still an infant, the Calhouns moved from Elkton to Winchester, Tennessee. After he completed kindergarten (taught by his mother), the family moved to the small rural town of Brownsboro, Tennessee. John would later refer to himself as a "Tennessee country boy".

In 1930, when John was 13, his father was promoted to the Tennessee school board, and the family relocated to Nashville. Shortly after, John began attending meetings of the Tennessee Ornithological Society. Amelia Laskey, distinguished for her work in bird banding and in the study of the chimney swift, was a pivotal influence on his developing interest in birds and bird habits. John spent much of his junior and senior high school years banding birds and observing their behavior.

Despite his father's refusal to help him attend an out-of-state university, John made his way to the University of Virginia where he obtained a bachelor's degree in biology in 1939. In his third year in 1938, he published his first scientific paper, titled "Swift Banding at Nashville and Clarksville"; it appeared in The Migrant, the journal of the Tennessee Ornithological Society. Over the summer, he worked for Alexander Wetmore, head of the Smithsonian Institution in Washington, D.C., doing ornithology research. Calhoun attended graduate school at Northwestern University where he earned an M.S. in biology, and a Ph.D. in ethology in 1943. His dissertation was on the activity rhythms of two rodents, prairie voles and Hispid cotton rats.

While at Northwestern University, Calhoun met Edith Gressley, an undergraduate biology major. They married in 1942. They had two daughters together and remained married until the end of Calhoun's life.

== Career ==
=== Early rat studies ===
After graduating from Northwestern, Calhoun taught at Emory University and Ohio State University. In 1946, he and Edith moved to Towson, Maryland, a suburb of Baltimore. Calhoun worked on the Rodent Ecology Project at Johns Hopkins University. The project was testing a new poison that would kill rats in downtown Baltimore. When the poison lost its efficacy, the project's leader, Johns Hopkins Professor David E. Davies, and his young assistant John Calhoun, noticed that the rats seemed to have a self-regulating mechanism that capped their population at about 150 rats per city block. Calhoun wanted to understand how the mechanism worked, and suggested an experiment to do so.

In March 1947, he began a 28-month study of a colony of nocturnal Norway rats in a 10,000-square-foot (930 m^{2}) outdoor pen. Even though five females over this time-span could theoretically produce 5,000 healthy progeny for this size pen, Calhoun found that the population never exceeded 200 individuals, and stabilized at 150. Moreover, the rats were not randomly scattered throughout the pen area, but had organized themselves into twelve or thirteen local colonies of a dozen rats each. He noted that twelve rats seemed to be the optimal number that can live harmoniously in a natural group, beyond which stress and psychological effects function as group break-up forces.

In Calhoun's next posting, at Jackson Laboratory in Bar Harbor, Maine, in 1951, he once more studied a colony of Norway rats. During this period, his first daughter, Catherine "Cat" Calhoun, was born. The family was living at the time in the guesthouse on the Luquer estate.

In late 1951, the Calhouns moved back to Silver Spring, Maryland. He worked for Walter Reed Army Medical Center in the neuropsychiatry division before gaining a position in 1954 at the National Institutes of Health, where he would be employed for the next 32 years. 1954 was also when his second daughter, Cheshire Calhoun, was born.

=== Norway rat experiments ===
Calhoun pursued his experiments in rodent behavior, using domesticated Norway rats, at his lab on the second floor of a huge barn on the Casey farm outside Rockville, Maryland. The area is now a suburban center but the barn still stands, renovated for suburban usage. In the days of Calhoun's occupancy, there was a small, cluttered office area at the top of the stairs. The rodent odor was said to be overpowering, and it took some time before one could breathe normally.

The research area was divided into three parts. In the center section, a box-like room was built. There was a hallway all the way around the box, and stairs that led to the top of it. The box was divided into four rooms, or habitats, 10 by 14 by 9 feet (3.0 m × 4.3 m × 2.7 m). Each room had a door for a researcher or caretaker to enter by, and in the ceiling of each room was a glass window. The activity in each room could be observed through these windows. Each room was divided into quarters by 2-foot-high (0.61 m; 24 in; 61 cm) partitions. V-shaped ramps connected pens I and II, II and III, and III and IV. Pens I and IV were not connected. Mounted on the wall in the corner of each quarter was an artificial burrow, which could be accessed via a spiral staircase. In two of the quarters, the "burrows" were 3 feet (0.91 m; 36 in; 91 cm) from the floor, and in the other two the "burrows" were 6 feet (1.8 m; 72 in; 180 cm) from the floor. Each quarter also contained a drinking station and a feeding station. These variations in environment led to differences in behavior patterns and ultimately to the concept of "behavioral sinks".

The research carried on in this lab (labeled the "Casey Barn") began in 1958 and lasted until 1962. In that year, he published a monograph, The Ecology and Sociology of Norway Rats. It was unusual then to associate the word "sociology"—normally reserved for the study of humans—with animal subjects, but it indicated Calhoun's growing belief that his rodent colonies could shed light on the social problems of humans. In July 1962, he temporarily moved his family to California after he accepted a one-year fellowship at the Center for Advanced Study in the Behavioral Sciences in Palo Alto.

In 1956, Calhoun had joined an informal think tank organized by psychiatrist Leonard Duhl, who worked at the National Institute of Mental Health (NIMH). The think tank's full name was the Committee to Explore the Influence of Physical Social Environmental Variables as Determinants of Mental Health, but its 17 members dubbed themselves "Space Cadets" because of their interest in how physical space affected well-being. The members had diverse specializations including architecture, city planning, physics, biology and mathematics. For more than a decade, the Space Cadets met two or three days each year, and the lively exchange of ideas stimulated Calhoun's thinking. It prompted him to question the existing literature on population growth in animals and humans. With help from his mathematician colleagues, Calhoun constructed a new statistical model to predict the level of "social welfare" in a rodent colony. The model's three key variables were: "the number of animals interacting with one another, the time between when an animal ended one social interaction and when it began another (the 'refractory' period), and the size of the space in which social interactions took place."

=== Mouse experiments ===
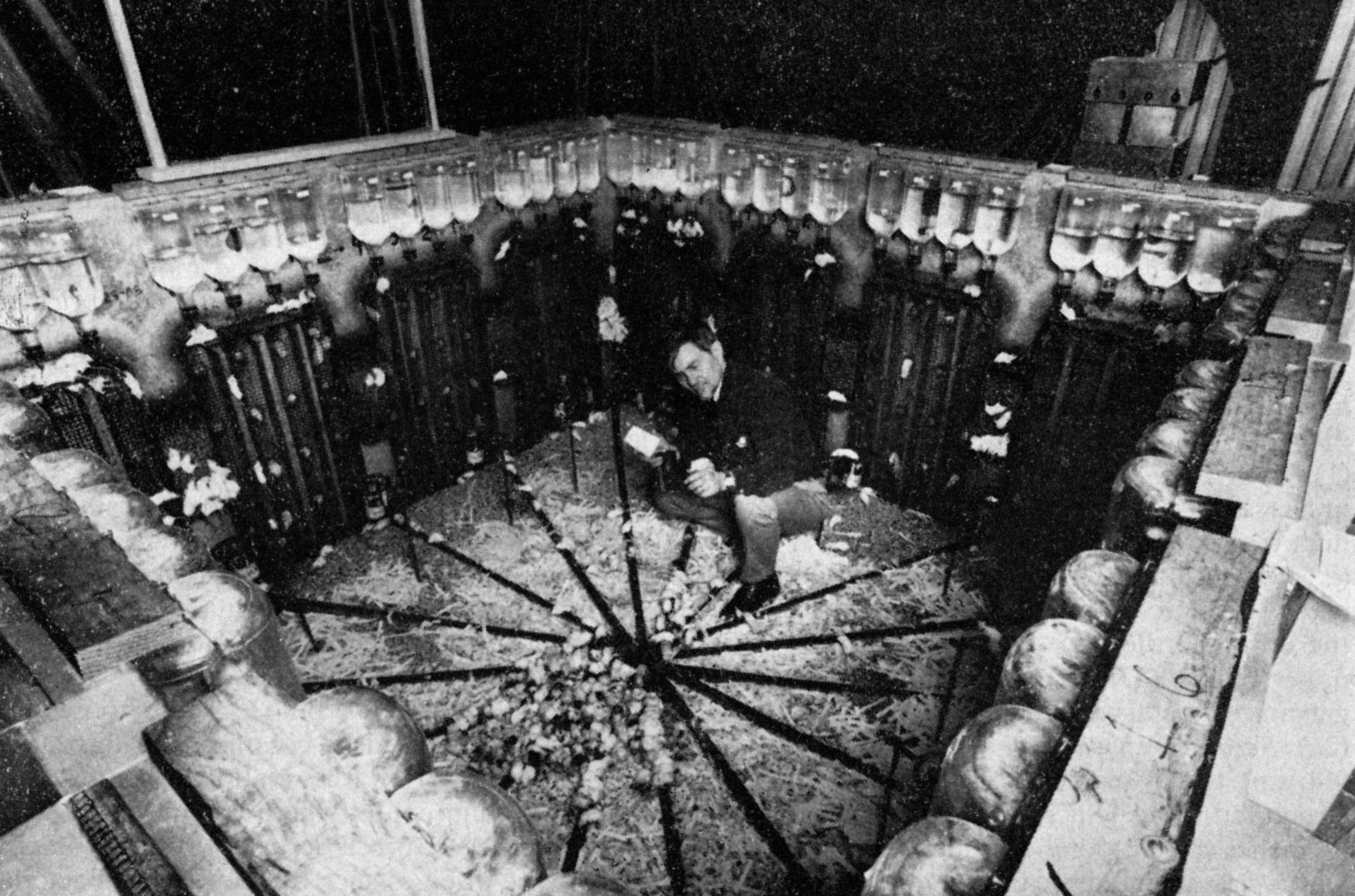
John Calhoun (age 52) with mice experiment (1970)

In the early 1960s, NIMH acquired rural property outside Poolesville, Maryland. The facility that was built on the property housed several research projects, including those headed by Calhoun. It was here that he conducted his landmark experiments with mouse universes, the most famous of which was called "Universe 25". In July 1968, four pairs of mice were introduced into the habitat, which was a 9-foot (2.7 m; 110 in; 270 cm) square metal pen with 4.5-foot-high (1.4 m; 54 in; 140 cm) sides. Each side had four groups of four vertical, wire mesh "tunnels". The "tunnels" gave access to nesting boxes, food hoppers, and water dispensers. There was no shortage of food or water or nesting material. There were no predators. The only adversity was the limit on space.

Initially, the population grew rapidly, doubling every 55 days. The population reached 620 by day 315, after which the population growth dropped markedly, doubling only every 145 days. The last surviving birth was on day 600, bringing the total population to a mere 2200 mice, even though the experiment setup allowed for as many as 3840 mice in terms of nesting space. This period between day 315 and day 600 saw a breakdown in social structure and in normal social behavior. Among the aberrations in behavior were the following: expulsion of young before weaning was complete, wounding of young, failing to engage in sexual approaches, inability of dominant males to maintain the defense of their territory and females, aggressive behavior of females, passivity of non-dominant males with increased attacks on each other which were not defended against.

After day 600, the social breakdown continued and the population declined toward extinction. Females ceased to reproduce. Their male counterparts withdrew completely, never engaging in courtship or fighting, and only performing tasks essential to their health. They ate, drank, slept, and groomed themselves – all solitary pursuits. Sleek, healthy coats and an absence of scars characterized these males. Breeding never resumed and behavior patterns were permanently changed.

The conclusions drawn from this experiment were that when all available space is taken and all social roles filled, competition and the stresses experienced by the individuals will result in a total breakdown in complex social behaviors, ultimately leading to the demise of the population. Calhoun summarized his findings in a paper, "Death Squared: The Explosive Growth and Demise of a Mouse Population", which he delivered as a speech in 1972 before an audience at the Royal Society of Medicine in London:

Calhoun told them of Universe 25, a giant experimental setup he had built and which he described as "a utopian environment constructed for mice" ... Calhoun had marked each mouse resident with a unique colour combination and he or his team sat in a loft over this mouseopolis, for hours every day, for more than three years, and watched what unfolded. Calhoun told the Royal Society members that what began as a rodent utopia – where mice had sumptuous accommodations, all the food and water they could want, and were free from the twin scourges of disease and predation – over time degenerated into a mouse hell. Initiated by a population explosion early on, and later stagnation and decline, that hell had mice displaying a suite of aberrant behaviors, including the loss of sexual drive on the part of males and the absence of maternal care in females. Calhoun attributed much of this to the formation of what he called a behavioral sink that had developed among the mice in Universe 25.

Calhoun saw the fate of the mouse population as an omen for the fate of an overcrowded human population. Segments of the mass media seized on Calhoun's findings and ran sensationalistic headlines.

=== Later research ===
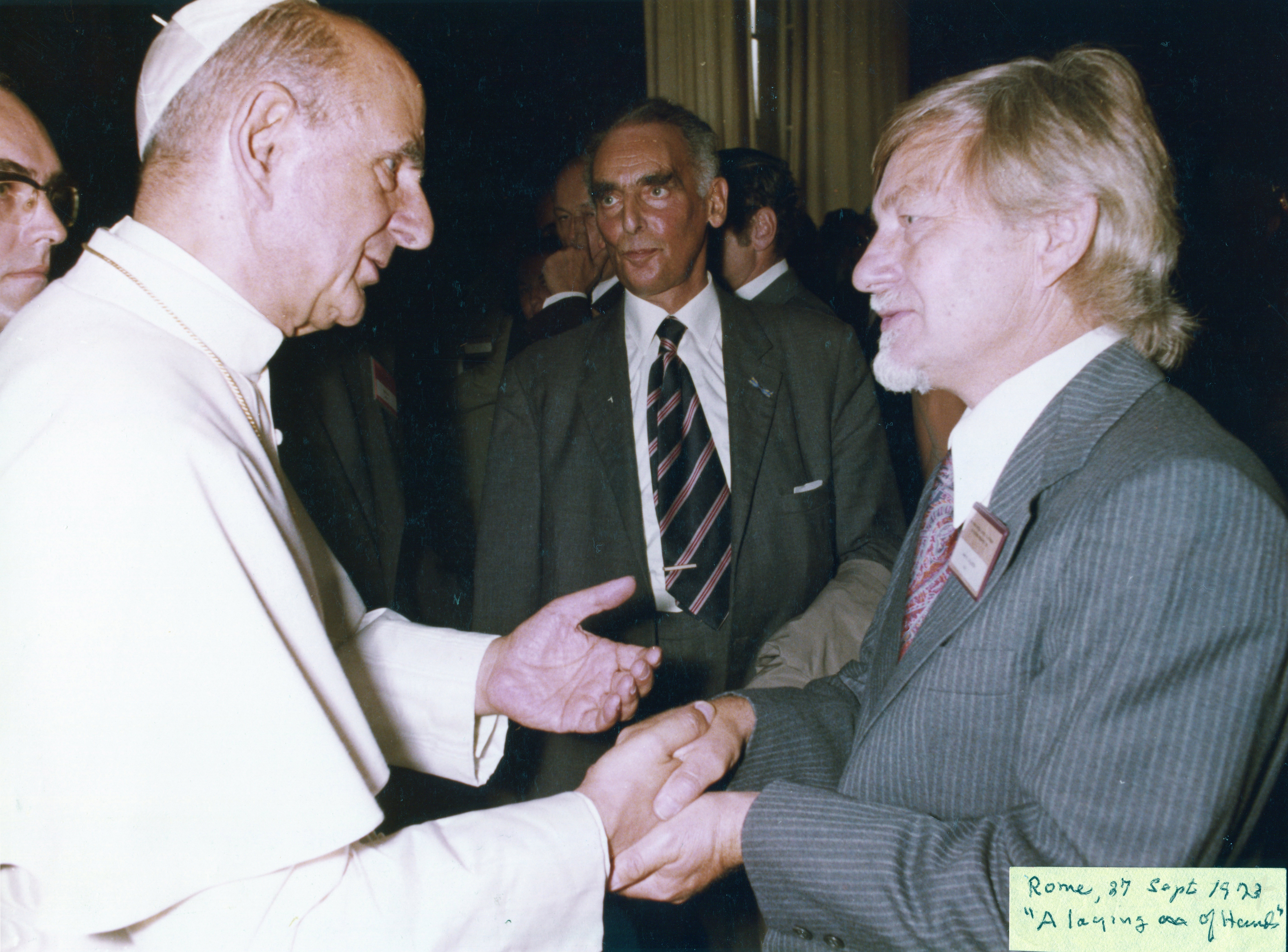
John Calhoun (age 56) meeting Pope Paul VI (27 September 1973).

In the 1970s and early 1980s, Calhoun operated Universe 33 for mice, and Universe 34 for rats, and extended the experiments which had brought him renown. He observed more evidence of behavioral sink as the rodent populations grew.

He continued to speak and write about an idea he first proposed at a 1968 American Association for the Advancement of Science (AAAS) symposium. He believed that the human brain had reached its "maximum functional potential" and must be augmented by "thinking prostheses" which would connect individuals in a common communication network. He researched the idea in the 1970s and, at the 1982 annual AAAS meeting, he delivered a paper on the topic, "The Transitional Phase in Knowledge Evolution", in which he stated: "The next phase shift in evolution should utilize computer-like devices and interlinked systems of them to simulate biological brain function to manipulate more effectively thought products of the human brain and process them for return use in human reflection." His supporters later claimed he was anticipating the development of the World Wide Web.

=== Final years ===
By the mid-1980s, Calhoun was losing his research funding at NIMH. He eventually submitted his resignation in September 1986. In his final years, he opted to pursue various idiosyncratic projects. He worked on a never-completed science fiction novel, 317 P.H.: A Satire on a Future Multiple "Utopia", about a post-human species that was bred to survive the apocalypse." He resumed promoting, and trying to invent, a prosthetic "world brain".

On September 7, 1995, John Calhoun died of a stroke while travelling with his wife in Hanover, New Hampshire. He was 78. His papers were donated to the National Library of Medicine by Edith Calhoun and by the American Heritage Center.

== Influence and legacy ==
Calhoun's mouse experiments have been cited by writers such as Bill Perkins as a warning of the dangers of living in an "increasingly crowded and impersonal world". Others took different lessons; medical historian Edmund Ramsden hypothesized that the mouse society collapsed from excessive social interaction, rather than density per se. A writer in io9 stated, "Instead of a population problem, one could argue that (the mouse universe) had a fair distribution problem."

In the mid-1960s, Steve Suomi was a research assistant to Professor Paul Ehrlich, a population ecologist at Stanford University. Having been deeply fascinated by Calhoun's 1962 Scientific American article, "Population Density and Social Pathology", Suomi presented Ehrlich with a synopsis of the article, which was then alluded to in Ehrlich's 1968 bestseller The Population Bomb:

We know all too well that when rats or other animals are overcrowded, the results are pronounced and usually unpleasant. Social systems may break down, cannibalism may occur, breeding may cease altogether. The results may not bode well for human beings as they get more and more crowded.

However, Ehrlich quickly added a caveat: "But extrapolating from the behavior of rats to the behavior of human beings is much more risky than extrapolating from the physiology of rats to the physiology of human beings. Man's physical characteristics are much more ratlike than are his social systems."

Mrs. Frisby and the Rats of NIMH (1971), by Robert C. O'Brien, was inspired by Calhoun's work; the book was later the basis of the animated film, The Secret of NIMH. Edmund Ramsden described one of Calhoun's experiments in which rats were placed in a sealed enclosure:

At the experiments' end, the only animals still alive had survived at an immense psychological cost: asexual and utterly withdrawn, they clustered in a vacant huddled mass [...] In the words of one of Calhoun's collaborators, rodent "utopia" had descended into "hell".

Calhoun's "behavioral sink" phrase has been used in reference to perceived urban moral degradation. In 1966, author Tom Wolfe popularized the phrase when he published an essay, "O Rotten Gotham – Sliding Down into the Behavioral Sink", in the New York World Journal Tribune after learning about Calhoun's rat experiments. Alan Grant, who co-wrote with John Wagner many of the dystopian Judge Dredd stories, acknowledged Calhoun as an influence. Ramsden believes Calhoun's work may have influenced other apocalyptic fiction as well, including the 1973 film Soylent Green.

Calhoun's scientific legacy has been subject to debate, with some scientists questioning the methodologies he used. Jon Day writes:

[H]is experiments have never been successfully replicated by other researchers, and wild colonies of rats don't seem to display any of the personality types he so vividly described. He rarely published in mainstream scientific journals, saying that his concerns were so pressing that he didn't have time to wait for peer review. It seems plausible that Calhoun was responsible for creating the conditions for population collapse. He only cleaned out Universe 25 every six to eight weeks; disease and parasitism could account for many of the phenomena he thought were due to mere proximity.

== Bibliography ==
=== Books ===
Calhoun wrote or edited a number of academic books, including:

- Notes on the Summer Birds of Hardeman and McNairy Counties (1941) OCLC 15092724
- Crowding and Social Behavior in Animals (1948)
- Social Welfare as a Variable in Population Dynamics (1957) OCLC 929878499
- Calculation of Home Range and Density of Small Mammals (with James Unwin Casby, 1958) OCLC 14594468
- The Ecology and Sociology of the Norway Rat (1962) OCLC 463121873
- The Social Use of Space (1963) OCLC 27054170
- Environment and Population: Problems of Adaptation: An Experimental Book Integrating Statements by 162 Contributors (editor, 1983) ISBN 0030633370

=== Selected articles ===
- Calhoun, John B. (1947). "The Role of Temperature and Natural Selection in Relation to the Variations in the Size of the English Sparrow in the United States". The American Naturalist. 81 (798): 203–228. Bibcode:1947ANat...81..203C. doi:10.1086/281513.
- Calhoun, John B. (1949). "Influence of Space and Time on the Social Behavior of the Rat". The Anatomical Record. 105 (28): 508–535.
- Calhoun, John B. (1950). "The Study of Wild Animals under Controlled Conditions". Annals of the New York Academy of Sciences. 51 (6): 1113–22. Bibcode:1950NYASA..51.1113C. doi:10.1111/j.1749-6632.1950.tb27339.x. S2CID 84859682.
- Calhoun, John B. (1952). "The Social Aspects of Population Dynamics" (PDF). Journal of Mammalogy. 33 (2). American Society of Mammalogists: 139–159. doi:10.2307/1375923. JSTOR 1375923.
- Calhoun, John B. (February 1962). "Population Density and Social Pathology". Scientific American. 206 (2): 139–148. PMID 13875732 – via Internet Archive.
- Calhoun, John B. (1970). "Space and the Strategy of Life" (PDF). Ekistics. 29 (175): 425–437.
- Calhoun, John B. (November 1972). "Plight of the Ik and Kaiadilt Is Seen as a Chilling Possible End for Man". Smithsonian. Vol. 3, no. 8. pp. 27–32. ISSN 0037-7333. OCLC 58002970.
- Calhoun, John B. (January 1973). "Death Squared: The Explosive Growth and Demise of a Mouse Population". Proceedings of the Royal Society of Medicine. 66 (1 Pt 2): 80–88. doi:10.1177/00359157730661P202. PMC 1644264. PMID 4734760.
- Calhoun, John B. (January 1973). "RxEvolution, Tribalism, and the Cheshire Cat: Three Paths from Now" (PDF). Technological Forecasting and Social Change. 4 (3): 263–282. doi:10.1016/0040-1625(73)90058-9.
- Calhoun, John B. (1984). "The Transitional Phase in Knowledge Evolution". Man-Environment Systems. 14: 131–142.

== See also ==
- Lek mating
- Proxemics

== Sources ==
- Day, Jon (July 24, 2025). "The Beautiful Ones". London Review of Books. Vol. 47, no. 13.
- Dugatkin, Lee Alan (2024). Dr. Calhoun's Mousery: The Strange Tale of a Celebrated Scientist, a Rodent Dystopia, and the Future of Humanity. The University of Chicago Press. ISBN 978-0226827858.
