= Cheshire Calhoun =

American philosopher

- Education: Northwestern University (BA); University of Texas at Austin (MA/PhD)
- Institutions: Colby College; Arizona State University
- Main interests: Ethics; Moral psychology; Feminist philosophy
- Website: https://cheshirecalhoun.com/

Cheshire Calhoun is a professor of Philosophy at Arizona State University and research professor at the Center for the Philosophy of Freedom at the University of Arizona. She is best known for her work in feminist philosophy as well as writing on gay and lesbian philosophy and the morality of same-sex marriage.

== Education and career ==
Calhoun is the second daughter of John B. Calhoun, an ethicist best known for behavioral sink theory.

She earned her Ph.D. in philosophy at the University of Texas, Austin in 1981, and taught at College of Charleston and Colby College before moving to Arizona State in 2007.

In 2014, she was elected as the board chair of the American Philosophical Association where she has previously served on the executive committee for the APA's Eastern Division as well as the APA's committee for LGBT philosophers.

In 2020, she was elected a Fellow of the American Academy of Arts and Sciences.

== Philosophical work ==
Calhoun argues for same-sex marriage—and against the United States' Defense of Marriage Act—on the basis that equal access to the institution of marriage for homosexual and heterosexual people is the only way to guarantee equal citizenship and societal worth for lesbian and gay people.

== Bibliography ==
- What is an Emotion? (co-edited with Robert C. Solomon; Oxford University Press, 1984)
- Feminism, the Family, and the Politics of the Closet: Lesbian and Gay Displacement (Oxford University Press, 2000)
- Setting the Moral Compass: Essays by Women Philosophers (Oxford University Press, 2004)
- Moral Aims: Essays on the Importance of Getting Things Right and Practicing Morality with Others (Oxford University Press, 2015)
- Doing Valuable Time: The Present, the Future, and Meaningful Living (Oxford University Press, 2018)
