= Sophia Lin =

American film producer

Sophia Lin is an American film producer. She is known for producing the 2011 film Take Shelter, for which she won Film Independent Spirit Awards' Piaget Producers Award.

== Early life ==
Lin grew up in Livingston, New Jersey, where she attended Livingston High School and became involved in student theatre. She studied at New York University's Tisch School of the Arts, majoring in film and television.

== Career ==
Lin's first job on a feature film was as a script supervisor on the 1996 film Girls Town. She worked as a production manager on the second season of Strangers with Candy (2000), The Business of Strangers (2001), and Party Monster (2003), although she said her "big break" was working on All the Real Girls (2003), directed by David Gordon Green, since she met collaborators who would help her to find ongoing work in the film industry.

In 2009, writer–director Jeff Nichols, with whom Lin had previously worked on a failed project, sent her his script titled Take Shelter. Alongside Tyler Davidson, she agreed to produce the film, which was shot in 2010 and released in 2011. Take Shelter received numerous awards and nominations, and was selected by the National Board of Review as one of the top ten independent films of 2011. Lin personally won the Film Independent Spirit Awards' Piaget Producers Award, which, according to Film Independent, "recognizes an emerging producer who demonstrates the creativity, tenacity, and vision required to produce quality independent films." Lin and Davidson went on to produce Craig Zobel's feature Compliance (2012) together. She executive-produced Camp X-Ray (2014) and produced Z for Zachariah (2015).

Variety magazine named Lin as one of their "10 Producers to Watch" in 2011. The following year, she was named one of "10 Producers Who Will Change Hollywood in 2012" by TheWrap.
