= Racso and the Rats of NIMH =

Novel by Jane Leslie Conly

- First edition
- Author: Jane Leslie Conly
- Illustrator: Leonard B. Lubin
- Language: English
- Series: Rats of NIMH series
- Genre: Children, fantasy novel
- Publisher: Harper & Row
- Publication date: 1986
- Publication place: United States
- Media type: Print (hardback & paperback)
- Pages: 278
- ISBN: 0-06-021362-0
- OCLC: 12370051
- Dewey Decimal: [Fic] 19
- LC Class: PZ7.C761846 Ras 1986
- Preceded by: Mrs. Frisby and the Rats of NIMH
- Followed by: R-T, Margaret, and the Rats of NIMH

Racso and the Rats of NIMH is the 1986 sequel to the popular book, Mrs. Frisby and the Rats of NIMH, written by Jane Leslie Conly. It continues where the previous book left off. The book would be followed by a sequel published in 1990, R-T, Margaret, and the Rats of NIMH.

A review from the University of Chicago's Center for Children's books states that "Conly has completely mastered the bucolic tone of the first book", and that "characterizations all around are more detailed than in O'Brien's book".

== Story ==
In Racso and the Rats of NIMH, the Rats of NIMH have developed a self-sustaining community in Thorn Valley, where they are completely isolated from humanity. Timothy Frisby, the youngest son of Mrs. Frisby, travels from his family's home to Thorn Valley (although his mother is an ordinary mouse, Timothy has inherited the extremely high intellect and long lifespan of his father, NIMH escapee Jonathan).

During his trip, Timothy meets Racso, the son of Jenner (a rat of NIMH introduced in first book who is widely considered to be a traitor). Timothy and Racso arrive at Thorn Valley, but while Timothy integrates and begins receiving the same accelerated education as the rat children, Racso, coming from a colony of savage urban rats, has trouble adjusting to life in a cultured town of rodents. Racso is also burdened by his family history, as his father deserted the rats' previous colony, placing them in danger of extinction.

Life in Thorn Valley is suddenly threatened when humans begin planning to build a dam there, which will flood most of Thorn Valley and destroy the rats' colony. The rats set a complex plan into motion to reprogram the developers' computers and sabotage the project.

== Connections to previous works ==
=== Mrs. Frisby and the Rats of NIMH ===
Racso and the Rats of NIMH is a direct sequel to the Newbery Medal-winning book Mrs. Frisby and the Rats of NIMH by Jane Leslie Conly's late father, Robert C. O'Brien. Conly wrote her sequel long after O'Brien's death in 1973, so even though Conly's book attempts to answer many of the open-ended questions posed by the original, it is still Conly's work and not O'Brien's. One of the most anticipated events of the first book was the possibility of Mrs. Frisby's children (Teresa, Martin, Timothy, and Cynthia) having grown up to visit the rats themselves and partake in adventures of their own. Within this book, however, only Timothy is shown as having actually left for Thorn Valley. Teresa and Cynthia are still at home, and Martin has started a family of his own. While it ties up this plot point cleanly, many readers criticized this, feeling that the other children had much potential and deserved more exploration. Another question from the first book that Conly chose to answer relates to the fate of Justin, one of the rats who was a major character in the first book. In the end of the original story, O'Brien hints that Justin sacrificed his life when he went back to rescue a fallen rat, but Conly chose to keep Justin alive and well in her sequel.

Another subject in which more information was brought to light was that of Jenner. In the first book it was hinted that Jenner had died, but in an event prior to those of the book. Jenner had disagreed with Nicodemus over leaving the city, and took a group of separatists to start a new colony. In the end of the first book, it is revealed that NIMH had found a number of unusual rats dead, and it is assumed that this is Jenner's group.

However, according to the sequel, Jenner had in fact managed to escape the fate of the others (the first book having left it inconclusive whether "six or seven" dead rats were found, Jenner's group having had seven). Although he and the few surviving separatists had strong philosophical opposition toward the Thorn Valley group, they kept their distance, still believing that their way of life was better. In the sequel, it is revealed that Jenner had started a family, which Racso happens to be a part of. Jenner later makes a surprise appearance in the story and shows that despite his questionable loyalties, he cares strongly for his son. Some readers feel that the inclusion of Jenner as an antihero was heavily influenced by the film adaptation of the first book, The Secret of NIMH, in which Jenner played a much more central role than he did in the book. Jenner only turns up rarely in the book, mainly in flashbacks, and is killed during the climax.

=== The Secret of NIMH ===
Despite a few plot similarities Racso and the Rats of NIMH has no connection to The Secret of NIMH's sequel, Timmy to the Rescue.
