= Arthur Malet =

British actor (1927–2013)

- Malet in the Dallas episode "Three, Three, Three: Part 1" in 1990
- Born: Vivian Arthur Rivers Malet; 24 September 1927; Lee-on-the-Solent, Hampshire, England
- Died: 18 May 2013 (aged 85); Santa Monica, California, USA
- Occupation: Actor
- Years active: 1956–1998

Vivian Arthur Rivers Malet (24 September 1927 – 18 May 2013) was an English actor. He was known for his films Mary Poppins (1964), Halloween (1978), The Secret of NIMH (1982), and Hook (1991). His last film role was The Secret of NIMH 2: Timmy to the Rescue (1998), in which he voiced Mr. Ages.

== Life and career ==
Vivian Arthur Rivers Malet was born on 24 September 1927 in Lee-on-the-Solent, Hampshire, England, the son of Henry Guy Rivers Malet and Olga Muriel Balfour; a scion of the Malet baronets. He emigrated to the United States in the 1950s, changed his forename to Arthur, began acting onstage, and won two Drama Desk Awards in 1957. He came to prominence in 1960s films, often playing characters much older than his real age, such as Mr. Dawes, Jr., in Disney's Mary Poppins (1964), and King Eidilleg in Disney's 1985 animated film The Black Cauldron.

He played undertaker Ted Ulam in Norman Jewison's 1967 film In the Heat of the Night, and Joe Fenwick in a 1972 episode of Columbo, "Dagger of the Mind". He went on to play a village elder in Mel Brooks's Young Frankenstein in 1974, the graveyard keeper in John Carpenter's Halloween in 1978, a houseman in the 1984 film Oh God, You Devil, Tootles in 1991's Hook, and Owen Owens in the 1992 film Toys.

His appearances on television included episodes of The Donna Reed Show, The Rifleman, Adventures in Paradise, The Alfred Hitchcock Hour ("The McGregor Affair"; originally aired 23 November 1964), Gunsmoke (S10E16’s “Run Sheep, Run” in 1964), Bewitched ("The Trial and Error of Aunt Clara"; originally aired 2 February 1967), Wonder Woman and Dallas. In 1965 he appeared as murder victim Ralph Day in the Perry Mason episode, "The Case of the Golden Venom". He played a vagrant who claimed to have stolen Aunt Bea's pin on The Andy Griffith Show in 1966. In 1969 Malet appeared as the night clerk on the TV series The Virginian in the episode titled "Journey to Scathelock". In 1995, he portrayed Charles Randolph in A Little Princess. In 1997, he did voice work in Anastasia. He voiced the character of "Mr. Ages" in The Secret of NIMH in 1982 and reprised the role in The Secret of NIMH 2: Timmy to the Rescue in 1998. Malet had a regular role on the short-lived 1983 television adaptation of the film Casablanca.

== Death ==
Malet died on 18 May 2013 at age 85, in Santa Monica, California, USA.

== Filmography ==
Year	Title	Role	Notes
1962	Convicts 4	Storekeeper	
1964	Mary Poppins	Mr. Dawes Jr.	
1965	King Rat	Blakely	
1966	Munster, Go Home!	Alfie	
1966	Lt. Robin Crusoe, U.S.N.	Umbrella Man	
1966	Penelope	Major Higgins	
1967	The Scorpio Letters	Hinton	
1967	The Adventures of Bullwhip Griffin	Chinese Food Eater	Uncredited
1967	In the Heat of the Night	Ulam	
1968	The Helicopter Spies	White Hunter	
1970	The Great White Hope	Barrister	Uncredited
1971	Vanishing Point	Hitchhiker	
1971	Bedknobs and Broomsticks	Mr. Widdenfield	Uncredited
1972	The Culpepper Cattle Co.	Doctor	
1973	Ace Eli and Rodger of the Skies	Brother Watson	
1974	Young Frankenstein	Village Elder	
1976	The Enforcer	Bystander	Uncredited
1978	Heaven Can Wait	Everett	
1978	Halloween	Graveyard Keeper	
1979	Disaster on the Coastliner	Southbound Conductor	Television film
1981	Savage Harvest	MacGruder	
1982	The Secret of NIMH	Mr. Ages	Voice
1984	Oh, God! You Devil	Houseman	
1984	City Heat	Doc Loomis	
1985	The Black Cauldron	King Eidilleg	Voice
1989	Worth Winning	Ticket Taker	
1990	Dick Tracy	Diner Patron	
1991	Beastmaster 2: Through the Portal of Time	Wendel	
1991	The Runestone	Stoddard	
1991	Hook	Tootles	
1992	Toys	Owen Owens	
1995	A Little Princess	Charles Randolph	
1997	Anastasia	Traveling Man, Major Domo	Voice
1998	The Secret of NIMH 2: Timmy to the Rescue	Mr. Ages	Voice

== Television ==
Year	Title	Role	Notes
1961	Alfred Hitchcock Presents	Dr. Larson	Season 6 Episode 26: "Coming, Mama"
1962	Gunsmoke	Farnum	Season 7 Episode 34: "The Boys"
1962	The Rifleman	Jeremy Pennebroke	Season 4 Episode 18: "Sporting Chance"
1962	Dennis the Menace	Dr. Carl Cadwell / Dr. Cecil Cadwell	Season 3 Episode 29: "Wilson Goes to the Dentist"
1962	The Untouchables	Brother Adam	Season 3 Episode 26: "Pressure"
1963	The Untouchables	Mission Man	Season 4 Episode 25: "The Giant Killer"
1963	Dennis the Menace	Reverend Stone	Season 4 Episode 16: "Wilson's Little White Lie" (uncredited)
1964	The Alfred Hitchcock Hour	Burke	Season 3 Episode 7: "The McGregor Affair"
1965	The Dick Van Dyke Show	Engineer	Season 4 Episode 27: "Never Bathe on Saturday"
1965	Rawhide	T. Reginald Wingate	Season 7 Episode 16: "A Time for Waiting"
1965	Perry Mason	Ralph Day	Season 8 Episode 17: "The Case of the Golden Venom"
1965	Gunsmoke	“Nester” Cox	Season 10 Episode 16: "Run, Sheep, Run"
1966	The Andy Griffith Show	Vagrant	Season 6 Episode 19: "Lost and Found"
1966	The Andy Griffith Show	Purvis	Season 6 Episode 29: "The Battle of Mayberry"
1966	The Wild Wild West	Doc Keyno	Season 1 Episode 16: "The Night of the Steel Assassin"
1966	The Man from U.N.C.L.E.	Professor Kenton	Season 3 Episode 14: "The My Friend the Gorilla Affair"
1967	The Man from U.N.C.L.E.	White Hunter	Season 4 Episode 4: "The Prince of Darkness Affair: Part 1"
1967	Bewitched	Judge Bean	Season 3 Episode 21: "The Trial and Error of Aunt Clara"
1967	The Monkees	Curator	Season 2 Episode 5: "Art, for Monkees' Sake"
1967	The Wild Wild West	Doc Keyno	Season 3 Episode 9: "The Night of the Circus of Death"
1968	Bonanza	Tingle the Barber	Season 10 Episode 7: "Catch as Catch Can"
1969	The Wild Wild West	Professor Montague	Season 4 Episode 18: "The Night of the Janus"
1969	The Virginian	Night Clerk	Season 8 Episode 12: "Journey to Scathelock"
1969	I Dream of Jeannie	Uncle Vasmir	Season 5 Episode 10: "Uncle a Go-Go"
1970	Mission: Impossible	Undertaker	Season 5 Episode 8: "Decoy"
1970	Night Gallery	Ennis	Season 1 Episode 2: (segment) "The Little Black Bag"
1971	Night Gallery	Abel Joyce	Season 2 Episode 12: (segment) "Camera Obscura"
1972	Columbo	Fenwick	Season 2 Episode 4: "Dagger of the Mind"
1973	Gunsmoke	Oldtimer	Season 19 Episode 11: "The Hanging of Newly O'Brien"
1973	Hawaii Five-O	Artie Boland	Season 5 Episode 24: "Jury of One"
1976	Monster Squad	The Wizard	Season 1 Episode 9: "The Wizard"
1978	Police Woman	Gardener	Season 4 Episode 21: "Flip of a Coin"
1979	Charlie's Angels	James Hannah	Season 3 Episode 15: "Disco Angels"
1979	Wonder Woman	Professor Zander	Season 3 Episode 18: "A Date with Doomsday"
1981	Dallas	Mr. Forest	Season 5 Episode 4: "Little Boy Lost"
1982	Dallas	Mr. Forest	Season 5 Episode 22: "Vengeance"
1982	Dallas	Forest	Season 5 Episode 24: "The Investigation"
1982	CHiPs	Junkman	Season 5 Episode 19: "Silent Partner"
1983	Casablanca	Carl	5 episodes: (1) "Who Am I Killing?"; (2) "Master Builder's Woman"; (3) "Jenny"; (4) "The Cashier and the Belly Dancer"; (5) "Divorce Casablanca Style"
1990	Dallas	Ryan	Season 13 Episode 26: "Three, Three, Three: Part 1"
1990	Dallas	Ryan	Season 13 Episode 27: "Three, Three, Three: Part 2"
1990	Dallas	Ryan	Season 14 Episode 1: "April in Paris"
1990	Dallas	Ryan	Season 14 Episode 2: "Charade"
1990	Dallas	Ryan	Season 14 Episode 3: "One Last Kiss"
