= The Masks of Time =

1968 science fiction novel by Robert Silverberg

- First edition
- Author: Robert Silverberg
- Cover artist: Robert Foster
- Genre: Science fiction
- Publisher: Ballantine Books
- Publication date: May 1968
- Media type: Print (hardcover & paperback)
- Pages: 252
- OCLC: 17316687

The Masks of Time is a science fiction novel by American author Robert Silverberg, first published in 1968. It was a nominee for the Nebula Award in 1968.

It was published in the United Kingdom under the title Vornan-19.

== Plot summary ==
Vornan-19 arrives on Christmas Day, 1998 in Rome. He floats down from the sky naked, landing on the Spanish Steps. The police try to arrest him, but he knocks them over with a touch. He is helped and given clothes by Horst Klein, who believes that the apocalypse will come in 389 days. Vornan-19 tells him that he is from the year 2999.

Jack Bryant, a graduate student under Leo Garfield at the University of California, is working toward a process to extract huge amounts of energy from ordinary matter. He leaves the physics department, marries a pretty blonde named Shirley, and they move to a house in the deserts of Arizona. Leo spends several months with Jack and Shirley to get a break from his physics work.

During Vornan-19's first public press conference, he mentions that in the future, society is very different, because they have tapped the energy within all matter so that no one has to work to obtain energy. Jack tells Leo that he left the university because he had finished his thesis showing how to extract the enormous amounts of energy within all particles of matter. He could not bear to release this theory, since it would dramatically change human society. He asks Leo to use his influence to question Vornan-19 on the subject to see if it was his theory that was used in the future.

When Leo returns to the university, he has a call from the White House, and is forced to join a group of scientists working for the US government on how to best deal with Vornan-19.

Vornan-19 comes to New York City, where he meets with the group of scientists, attends an outrageous house party, and tours the New York Stock Exchange. He reveals during the tour that in 2999 there is no capitalism and no money. All citizens have all that they need. After visiting the stock market, Vornan requests a visit to an automated brothel in Chicago.

During an interview in California, Vornan-19 says that in the future they have determined how life began on Earth. An alien spacecraft visited Earth long ago on a scouting mission, discovered no life forms, and so departed; but before leaving, it jettisoned a load of garbage that landed on Earth and eventually started life. Vornan then goes to the Moon, and when he returns he takes a break from his tour of Earth by staying with Leo's friends Jack and Shirley in Arizona. Shirley offers herself to Vornan, but he shows no interest; Vornan instead seduces Jack. Shirley then sleeps with Leo, who has been wanting her for years.

Vornan has been made into a messiah by the people of Earth. He visits Rio de Janeiro using a personal shield technology that should allow him to interact with the crowds. The shield fails, and Vornan is grabbed by the crowd; his body is never recovered. Leo remains in Rio until the turn of the century.

== Characters ==
- Vornan-19 — man from the future, specifically 2999.
- Leo Garfield — Physics professor at the University of California, specializing in the time-reversal of subatomic particles.
- Horst Klein — a nineteen-year-old German, the first person to talk to Vornan-19.
- Jack Bryant — A graduate student under Leo Garfield, inventor of a potentially world-altering energy conversion system.
- Shirley Bryant — Jack's young, attractive, free-wheeling wife.
- Sanford Kralick — Presidential aide who put together the Vornan-19 committee
- Marcus Ketthridge — Special Assistant to the President
- F. Richard Heyman — Historian on the Vornan-19 committee
- Helen McIlwain — Anthropologist on the Vornan-19 committee
- Morton Fields — Psychologist on the Vornan-19 committee
- Lloyd Kolff — Philologist on the Vornan-19 committee
- Aster Mikkelsen — Biochemist on the Vornan-19 committee

== Major themes ==
The Masks of Time has been described as an ironic and satiric treatment of the theme of salvation.

== Literary significance and reception ==
The Masks of Time has been described as "a brilliant and nearly flawless performance", and has been compared to Robert A. Heinlein's 1961 novel Stranger in a Strange Land. The story of Vornan-19 has been described as a realistic and ironic parody of the romantic and superhuman adventures of Valentine Michael Smith. Algis Budrys cited "gratuitous problems", but recommended readers to "go buy it. It's quite interesting".
