= Casablanca (1983 TV series) =

American drama based on the iconic 1942 film

- Genre: World War II spy/intrigue
- Starring: David Soul; Hector Elizondo; Ray Liotta; Patrick Horgan
- Theme music composer: Gerald Fried; Peter Matz
- Country of origin: United States
- Original language: English
- No. of seasons: 1
- No. of episodes: 5

Production
- Executive producer: David L. Wolper
- Producer: Charles B. Fitzsimons
- Production location: California
- Running time: 60 minutes
- Production companies: David L. Wolper Productions; Warner Bros. Television

Original release
- Network: NBC
- Release: April 10 – September 3, 1983

Casablanca is a 1983 American drama series, based on the 1942 film of the same name set in the genre of spying and intrigue during World War II. Five episodes were filmed but, following its NBC premiere on April 10, 1983, and two additional installments on April 17 and 24, it was taken off the air. The two remaining unaired episodes were ultimately scheduled four months later, during summer programming, and shown on August 27 and September 3. The show was the second attempt at a TV series based on the movie; the first was a 1955 show starring Charles McGraw as Rick Blaine, which also was short-lived, lasting only 10 episodes.

== Cast ==
- David Soul as Rick Blaine
- Reuven Bar-Yotam as Ferrari
- Hector Elizondo as Capt. Louis Renault
- Kai Wulff as Lt. Heinz
- Patrick Horgan as Maj. Strasser
- Ray Liotta as Sacha
- Arthur Malet as Carl
- Scatman Crothers as Sam

== Characters ==
As in the 1942 feature, which was widely released in 1943 and won the Academy Award for Best Picture in March 1944, the main character is named Rick Blaine and is portrayed in 1983 by David Soul who was born in 1943. The role of French police captain Louis Renault, originated by Claude Rains, was assigned to Hector Elizondo, Sydney Greenstreet's black marketeer Ferrari was played by Reuven Bar-Yotam, and Sacha the bartender, played in 1942 by Leonid Kinskey, a character actor usually seen in comical portrayals, was taken as a serious role by Ray Liotta.

Sam, Dooley Wilson's iconic piano player, was being interpreted by another veteran character player, Scatman Crothers (who had parodied the same role in the 1978 Neil Simon comedy The Cheap Detective), while Carl the maître d', created by still another familiar comical personality, "Cuddles" Sakall, returned in the person of latter-day character actor Arthur Malet. Finally, the main villain, Conrad Veidt's Major Strasser, who is fatally shot by Rick at the end of the film, is likewise back, in the portrayal by English actor Patrick Horgan. Strasser is also given an aide, Lieutenant Heinz, played by Kai Wulff. The series is described as taking place over a year before the events depicted in the 1942 film.

== Episodes ==
No.	Title	Directed by	Written by	Original release date
1	"Who Am I Killing?"	Ralph Senensky	James M. Miller	April 10, 1983
2	"The Master Builder's Woman"	Robert Lewis	Bob Foster	April 17, 1983
3	"Jenny"	Mel Stuart	Julius J. Epstein	April 24, 1983
4	"The Cashier and the Belly Dancer"	Ralph Senensky	Nelson Gidding	August 27, 1983
5	"Divorce, Casablanca Style"	Robert Lewis	Julius J. Epstein	September 3, 1983

== U.S. television ratings ==
Season	Episodes	Start date	End date	Nielsen rank	Nielsen rating
1982–83	5	April 10, 1983	September 3, 1983	91	N/A
