= Amelia Laskey =

American amateur naturalist and ornithologist (1885–1973)

- Born: Amelia Rudolph; December 12, 1885; Bloomington, Indiana, US
- Died: December 19, 1973 (aged 88); Nashville, Tennessee, US
- Other name: Mrs. F.C. Laskey
- Known for: Investigations of bird behavior
- Scientific career
- Fields: Ornithology

Amelia Rudolph Laskey (December 12, 1885 – December 19, 1973) was an American amateur naturalist and ornithologist noted for her contributions to the understanding of bird behavior. Many publications refer to her as Mrs F.C. Laskey. Though an autodidact without formal scientific training, she made original contributions to the field of ornithology and published in reputable scientific journals. She also mentored young naturalists, including John B. Calhoun, whose work on population dynamics was influenced by her observational methods.

Over the course of Laskey's career, her investigations included bird breeding behavior, nesting habits, territoriality, longevity, and migration. She was a regular participant in the National Audubon Society's Christmas Bird Count. Her scientific publications spanned 40 years, from 1933 to 1973, the year of her death, and included over 150 papers in ornithological journals. She banded 3,734 birds of 69 species. Laskey was also known for her rehabilitation of wounded birds.

== Early life and education ==
Laskey was born Amelia Rudolph to German immigrant parents, Susan and Frank Rudolph, in Bloomington, Indiana. Her father owned a construction business, and her mother was an avid gardener. She attended school in Chicago through high school. She then became a stenographer at the Oliver Typewriter Company before her marriage to Fredrick C. Laskey in 1911. She also taught girls at the Sunday school of the Ogden Park Methodist Church. In 1921, she and her husband moved to Nashville, Tennessee, where Fredrick worked as a manager at the Swift and Company. The couple did not have children.

== Ornithology research ==
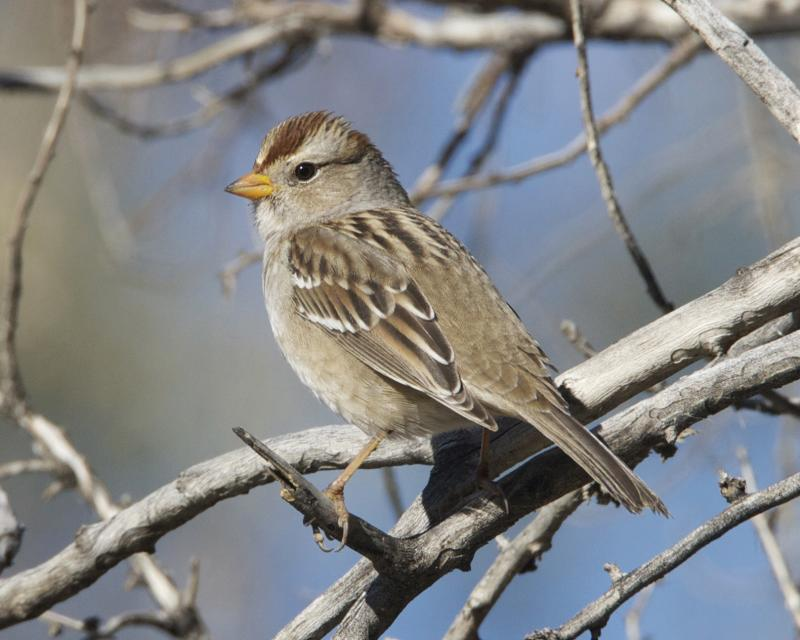
Immature Zonotrichia leucophrys, or white-crowned sparrow. Gambel's sparrow is a sub-species of the white-crowned sparrow.

Laskey's research career began following her 1921 move to Nashville, Tennessee. At that time, Laskey began to participate in a local gardening club, having an expansive garden at her home which she named "Blossomdell". Her garden provided natural territory for birds and other wild creatures. She also became a member of a local literary society. Through acquaintanceships in these organizations, Laskey joined the Tennessee Ornithological Society in 1928, from which she developed deep interest in ornithology.

=== Bird behavior studies ===
Laskey's initial investigations began with the migratory behavior of chimney swifts, cowbirds, and mockingbirds, species that are common in her locale. For this purpose, she obtained a bird banding license from the United States Fish and Wildlife Service. Laskey then commenced systematic investigations of bird behavior and migration. She continued to use bird-banding methods for the duration of her scientific career.

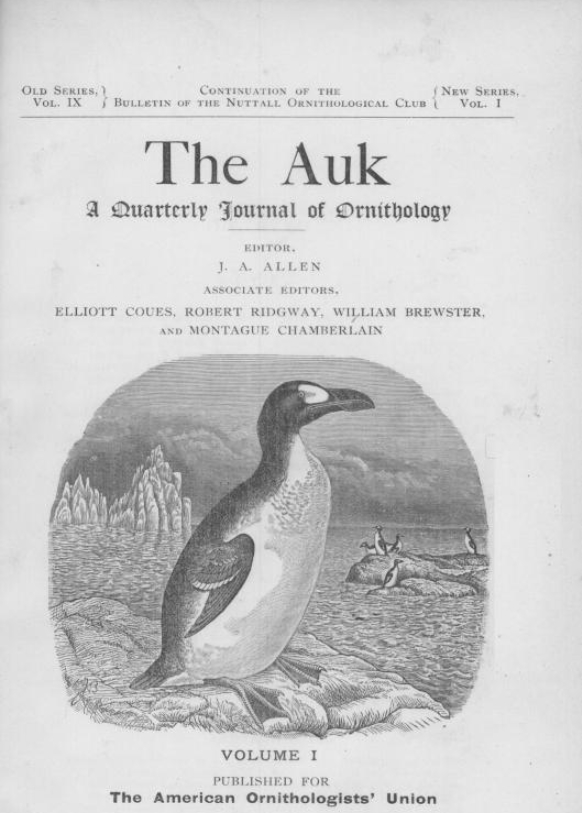
The first cover of The Auk, a scientific journal in which Laskey published 12 articles.

Among her early investigations, Laskey discovered that chimney swifts wintered in Peru. She determined early in her investigations that, while field sparrows are year-round residents of Tennessee, the winter population is different than the summer population of field sparrows. Laskey also studied bluebird nesting behavior and was the first to identify a Gambel's sparrow, a rare subspecies in Tennessee. Other rare species in Tennessee she observed were the Bicknell's thrush, the tree sparrow, and the Harris' sparrow.

She was particularly noted for her study of mockingbird behavior; Laskey investigated the species' song development, mating behavior, number of mates, their egg clutch sizes, and territorial defense. She also discovered that brown-headed cowbirds were monogamous.

One of Laskey's scientific methods was direct and prolonged observation of the behavior of specific individuals of a bird species. In this regard, Laskey kept a mockingbird named Honey child at her home for 15 years. Her study of this captive bird complemented her systematic studies of mockingbird behaviour, including song acquisition by mockingbirds.

Other birds that Laskey rehabilitated included a crippled red-tailed hawk which lived with her for another ten years and an albino great horned owl that she boarded for 22 years. She began bird banding in 1931 and became a very careful and prolific bander. Among her young pupils was the future ethologist John B. Calhoun. His approach to scientific research was shaped by Laskey's guidance, as evidenced by the precision monitoring technologies he would later use to study rodent inhabitants. She also contributed to Lowery and Newman's study of nocturnal bird migration through the observation of flocks of birds as their silhouettes crossed the disc of the moon.

=== Bird rescue ===
Beginning in 1948, Laskey became aware that many birds were dying for then unknown reasons at the Nashville Airport and at other airports. In her investigation into the fatalities, she found that birds were disoriented by a type of light used in ceilometers for cloud detection, especially during migration periods. She discovered that the fatalities could be avoided by use of suitably filtered light, and that U.S. aviation policy already mandated the use of such filters. Once the mandate was implemented, the problem of bird deaths from ceilometer usage was resolved. Laskey was also a pioneer researcher of migratory bird casualties at television towers.

=== Influences ===
Early in her scientific investigations, Laskey corresponded with professional ornithologist Margaret Morse Nice, who mentored Laskey and encouraged her to publish in scientific ornithological journals. This led to collaborations with Nice and other ornithologists including Josselyn Van Tyne.

== Honors and legacy ==
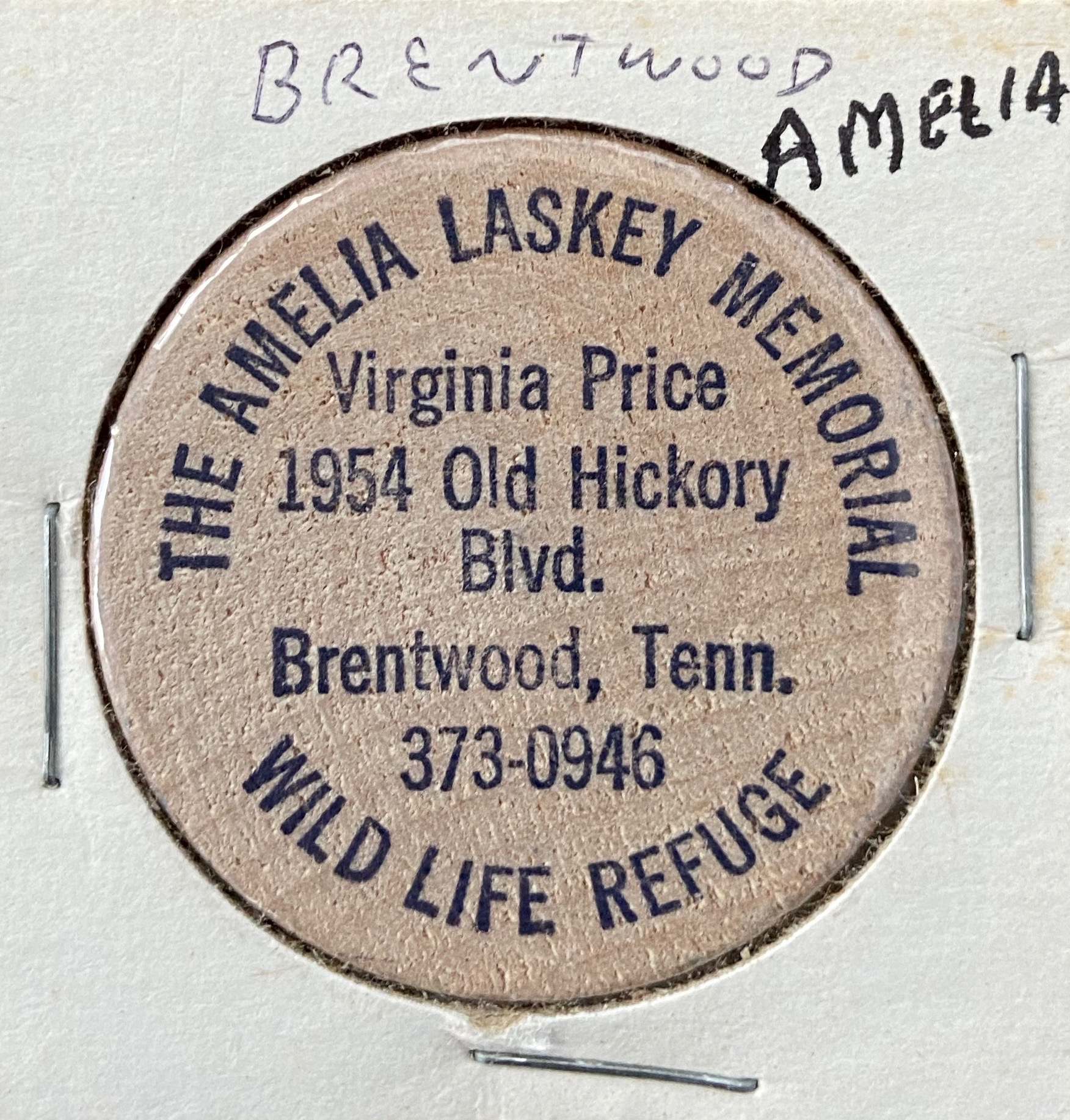
Amelia Laskey Wooden Nickel commemorating the Amelia Laskey Memorial Wild Life Refuge in Brentwood, Tennessee

Laskey was made a Fellow of the American Ornithologists' Union in 1966, an organization in which she held membership since 1933.

The Eastern Bluebird Nesting Project in the Warner Parks of Nashville, Tennessee, was started in 1936 by Amelia Laskey. It continues as of 2025 and is the oldest nesting project in the United States.

Laskey is interred next to her husband at Woodlawn Memorial Park and Mausoleum in Nashville, Tennessee.
