= Z for Zachariah (film) =

2015 film

- Theatrical release poster
- Directed by: Craig Zobel
- Screenplay by: Nissar Modi
- Based on: Z for Zachariah by Robert C. O'Brien
- Produced by: Steve Bannatyne; Sophia Lin; Tobey Maguire; Skuli Fr. Malmquist; Matthew Plouffe; Sigurjón Sighvatsson; Thor Sigurjonsson
- Starring: Chiwetel Ejiofor; Margot Robbie; Chris Pine
- Cinematography: Tim Orr
- Edited by: Jane Rizzo
- Music by: Heather McIntosh
- Production companies: Grindstone Entertainment Group; Silver Reel; Zik Zak Filmworks; Sighvatsson Films; Material Pictures
- Distributed by: Lionsgate; Roadside Attractions
- Release dates: January 24, 2015 (Sundance); August 28, 2015 (United States)
- Running time: 98 minutes
- Country: United States
- Language: English
- Box office: $121,461

Z for Zachariah is a 2015 apocalyptic science fiction film directed by Craig Zobel and starring Margot Robbie, Chiwetel Ejiofor, and Chris Pine. Written by Nissar Modi, it is based on the 1974 posthumously published book of the same name by Robert C. O'Brien, though the plot differs in some significant ways. The film's plot has also been compared to the 1959 Harry Belafonte movie The World, the Flesh and the Devil, about a love triangle between a black engineer, a white woman, and a white man who may be the last people on Earth.

The film was released on August 28, 2015, in the United States by Roadside Attractions and Lionsgate. The film had a limited theatrical release and was also released on video-on-demand platforms, and grossed $121,461 at the domestic US box office. It received generally positive reviews from critics.

== Plot ==
Ann Burden, the seemingly sole survivor of a recent nuclear apocalypse, lives an agrarian life on her family's valley farmstead with her dog. She is sheltered from radioactive contaminants outside the valley by rocky hillsides, favorable weather patterns, and an abundant supply of ground-fed water.

One day, Ann encounters another survivor, a man named John Loomis. He claims to be an engineer who, aided by medicines and a radiation suit, walked from a distant government bunker to Ann's valley. John unknowingly bathes in a radioactive creek and immediately becomes sick with radiation poisoning, but is nursed back to health by Ann, who welcomes him into her home.

John regains his strength and gradually becomes part of Ann's humble, rustic life. He helps Ann pump diesel from local gas pumps and gets the farm's long-disused tractor running so she can expand her plantings before the winter. Ann tells John about her parents and younger brother, who left the valley to find other survivors but never returned.

John speculates that he could generate hydroelectricity to power the farmhouse's dead generator from the nearby waterfall by using a water wheel fashioned from the Burden chapel's planks and beams. Ann is uncomfortable with this proposal because her father built the chapel and because of her deeply held Christian beliefs. John chooses not to pursue the project further.

Ann and John grow closer, cultivating crops and preparing for long-term winter habitation. Their domestic accord is marred by occasional tensions, notably involving matters of religion and John's drinking. One night, after both have drunk some wine, Ann begins to initiate a sexual relationship. John declines, claiming a sexual relationship will change them, and he needs more time.

Mysterious phenomena, including missing eggs and glimpses of a shadowy figure at the chapel, culminate in the arrival of a third survivor—a man named Caleb. Although Ann welcomes Caleb into the house, John questions Caleb's story and motives. Both men share the post-apocalyptic horrors they witnessed before reaching the valley. John describes a radiation-poisoned child begging him for death, whom he couldn't bring himself to oblige. Caleb describes watching the other underground miners kill each other in a fit of claustrophobic paranoia.

Later, John privately confides to Ann his belief that the dying boy was her long-absent brother and confesses to having killed him out of mercy. He resents Caleb, stating "You all be white people together," while Caleb repeatedly emphasizes the religious connection he shares with Ann, in stark contrast to John.

The three survivors slowly settle into a marginally stable partnership. Caleb convinces Ann to proceed with the water-wheel project, and work commences on tearing down her father's chapel for materials.

Perceiving their mutual attraction, John awkwardly gives Ann consent to pursue a romantic relationship with Caleb, but belies his grief and anger at losing Ann through his remarks. Shortly thereafter, following a night of drinking and revelry, a heavily intoxicated John tells Ann he loves her before passing out in a bedroom in Ann's home. Ann tries to wake him, wanting his affection, but being unable to, she joins Caleb in the adjoining bathroom, where the two have sex.

John and Caleb finish the water wheel, moving it and its wooden flume into place atop the waterfall. Encumbered by the bulky radiation suit, Caleb slips twice during his rope-assisted climb up the mossy cliffside. During the second slip, the two men silently lock eyes, both holding the rope, while Caleb teeters on the cliff's edge.

John returns to the farmhouse alone. Ann apologizes for her earlier indiscretion, and John claims Caleb left in search of other settlements. Ann takes the news badly, chases after Caleb, but does not find him, and lapses into a sullen silence. The farmhouse's electric lights and refrigeration are restored. Ann realizes John has moved her beloved church organ and a few pews into the barn. Ann, playing a hymn on the organ, exchanges a glance with John, and he prays behind her.

== Cast ==
- Chiwetel Ejiofor as John Loomis
- Margot Robbie as Ann Burden
- Chris Pine as Caleb

== Production ==
Modi began adapting the novel into a script several years before production began. The three principal cast members were announced in May 2013, which at the time included Amanda Seyfried. Seyfried, however, would eventually drop out and be replaced by Margot Robbie.

Set in the Eastern United States, the film was shot mostly in New Zealand. Principal photography began on January 27, 2014, in Canterbury, around the city of Christchurch. Director Craig Zobel and cinematographer Tim Orr drew on Russian director Andrei Tarkovsky's films, like Solaris (1972), The Mirror (1975), and Stalker (1979), for inspiration, incorporating landscapes into the story and using desaturated color. The film was shot digitally on an Arri Alexa camera and Panavision anamorphic lenses. Additional scenes at the film's opening were shot in Welch, West Virginia, in March 2014.

== Release ==
The film premiered at the Sundance Film Festival on January 24, 2015. Before the premiere of the film, Roadside Attractions and Lionsgate acquired distribution rights to the film.

The film was released both theatrically and on demand in the United States on August 28, 2015.

=== Critical response ===
On Rotten Tomatoes, the film has an approval rating of 79% based on reviews from 96 critics, with an average rating of 7/10. The site's consensus states: "Z for Zachariah wrings compelling drama out of its simplistic premise -- albeit at a pace that may test the patience of less contemplative viewers." On Metacritic, it has a score of 68 out of 100, based on 28 reviews, indicating "generally favorable" reviews.

Max Nicholson of IGN awarded 7.7 out of 10, saying, "While the film isn't without a few tonal flaws, the performances -- particularly Robbie's -- keep the story grounded in a sublime, post-apocalyptic reality." Matt Zoller Seitz of RogerEbert.com awarded it two and a half out of four stars, saying, "There are many sharply written, directed and performed moments of illumination and anxiety."
