= Crazy Lady! =

Book by Jane Leslie Conly

- Author: Jane Leslie Conly
- Language: English
- Genre: Children's literature
- Publisher: HarperCollins
- Publication date: 1993
- Publication place: United States
- Media type: Print (hardback & paperback)

Crazy Lady! is a children's novel written by Jane Leslie Conly. It was published in 1993 and was one of the Newbery Honor books of 1994.

== Setting and plot ==
The setting for Crazy Lady! is a small, working-class neighborhood in northern Baltimore, Maryland named Tenley Heights. The neighborhood consists mainly of brick row houses and Memorial Stadium is its centerpiece.

The story, which begins sometime around 1983 or 1984, is told in flashback form by the protagonist, Vernon Dibbs. As the story begins, Vernon and Miss Annie, an elderly former schoolteacher who became his tutor and helped him improve his grades in English, are talking about someone from their neighborhood who left two years earlier. Vernon tells Miss Annie he still remembers everything that happened vividly, and she suggests he put his thoughts into writing (which forms the basis for the story).

Vernon's family, like almost every other family in Tenley Heights, lives in one of the row houses. His mother, Mary, was a seamstress who died in 1980 from a massive stroke while at work. His father is a functionally illiterate laborer who usually works the second shift at a factory. Before Mary died, she gave birth to five children, of which Vernon is the third. He has an older sister named Steph, a younger sister named Sandra, an older brother named Tony, and a younger brother named Ben. When the story begins, Steph and Tony have left home; Steph is a laboratory technician who is married and living in the suburbs while Tony is attending college on a scholarship.

The flashback portion of the story begins in 1981, as Vernon starts junior high school. He is a year older than the rest of his classmates, due to being held back one grade earlier in his schooling. He is in danger of being held back again, because his schoolwork is suffering and so are his grades. Vernon also does not have any resources to help him get tutoring, as his father is usually working, the family finances do not allow for him to pay for it, and Steph and Tony are both busy with their own schoolwork and unable to take him to the local library to receive it.

Vernon spends most of his time hanging out with his friends Bobby, Chris, and Jerry, and they get their kicks by causing trouble in town and harassing Maxine Flooter, an alcoholic dubbed the "Crazy Lady" by everyone in the neighborhood. Maxine is often seen dressed eccentrically and dragging her intellectually disabled son, Ronald, around with her wherever she goes. Ronald is also a target for the boys' ridicule, which further infuriates his mother as she is his only caregiver.

One day, things begin to change. On a trip to the local grocery store for potatoes, Vernon sees the store owner, an old man named Milt, arguing with a customer over the price of the potatoes. Vernon has the same argument with Milt, as Steph had gone to his store a few days before and bought potatoes for the same price. Milt kicks Vernon out of the store, and the customer interrupts him on the way out to tell him he had done well. Vernon turns to look at her and discovers that the customer was Maxine.

The two of them get to talking, and Vernon lets it slip about how much trouble he is having in school. Maxine decides to try to get Vernon help and enlists the help of Miss Annie, who is her neighbor. She agrees to help Vernon pull up his English grade, but eventually insists that as payment, Vernon must help Maxine out around the house and help with Ronald as well. While it is not easy for him, as Maxine is usually drunk and sometimes ends up in jail as a result, Vernon begins spending more and more time around Maxine and Ronald and begins to form a friendship with the young man.

Eventually Vernon is all but ignoring his family, which does not help his already tense situation at home. He finds himself up late at night on several occasions talking with his father, who likes to come home and sit in the kitchen listening to oldies (which he claims help him think about the past), and those conversations help to form a bond between the two. Later in the story, Vernon's father asks him to teach him how to read, which is an important moment in their relationship.

After a few weeks, Vernon meets Ronald's teacher, who suggests to Maxine that Ronald sign up for the local Special Olympics. Vernon decides to take charge of the efforts to send Ronald to the games, getting the help of his friends in the process—especially Jerry, who has an intellectually disabled brother that he visits on the weekends and that he never tells anyone about.

Things start to come to a head when Vernon organizes a block party to help raise funds for Ronald. It ends when Maxine, drunk as usual, storms onto the block in a drunken rage and tells everyone off. Vernon's frustrations finally boil over after Maxine interrupts a Sunday Mass at the local church and begins telling all the people in the church exactly what she thinks about them—specifically telling Vernon that he does not have "the brains God gave a stump". After that, he refuses to have anything to do with her, only going in and out of the house to check on Ronald. Vernon even tells off Maxine when she tries to tell him something, which becomes important later.

The day of the Special Olympics arrives, and Ronald and Vernon win several ribbons as a team in walking races. They run into Ronald's teacher at the games, who offers them a ride home. While in the car on the ride home, Vernon discovers that Maxine had been trying to tell him that Ronald would be leaving Maryland and moving in with Maxine's relatives in North Carolina. Vernon is shaken by the news and storms out of the car on the side of the road. He then confronts Maxine about what she is about to do, with her telling him that she tried to help Ronald but that he will be better off in North Carolina.

Finally the day comes for Ronald to leave, and everyone in the neighborhood comes to bid him farewell (except for Maxine, who cannot bear to see her only child leave her). After everyone says their goodbyes, Ronald's new family drives away. The sight of Ronald leaving is too much for Vernon to handle, and he begins chasing after the car as fast as his legs can carry him; not only can he not catch up to the car, he trips over a curb and is sent sprawling into a wall. As he lies on the hard ground, severely injured, his father comes over to him. The book ends with him saying to his middle son: "Vernon, I'm here".

== Reception ==
Crazy Lady! has received the following accolades:

- John Newbery Medal honor book (1994)
- Dorothy Canfield Fisher Children's Book Award Nominee (1995)
- California Young Readers Medal Nominee for Middle School/Junior High (1996)

Despite the above, the book has also faced a lot of controversy due to offensive language. According to the American Library Association, Crazy Lady was one of the top one hundred banned and challenged books in the United States from 1990 to 1999 (62) and 2000 to 2009 (45), as well as one of the top ten books in 2005 (9).
