= The Secret of NIMH 2: Timmy to the Rescue =

1998 animated film by Dick Sebast

- VHS cover
- Directed by: Dick Sebast
- Written by: Sam Graham; Chris Hubbell; Additional material: Jymn Magon
- Based on: Characters by Robert C. O'Brien
- Produced by: Paul Sabella; Jonathan Dern
- Starring: Ralph Macchio; Dom DeLuise; Eric Idle; Hynden Walch; Meshach Taylor; Arthur Malet; William H. Macy; Andrea Martin; Harvey Korman; Andrew Ducote; Peter MacNicol
- Edited by: Jeffrey Patch
- Music by: Lee Holdridge; Songs: Lee Holdridge; Richard Sparks
- Production company: Metro-Goldwyn-Mayer Animation (Note: Animation outsourced to Wang Film Productions)
- Distributed by: MGM Home Entertainment (Note: Under MGM Family Entertainment imprint) (through Warner Home Video)
- Release date: December 22, 1998 (United States)
- Running time: 68 minutes
- Country: United States
- Language: English
- Budget: $6 million

The Secret of NIMH 2: Timmy to the Rescue is a 1998 American direct-to-video animated musical adventure film produced by MGM Animation. Directed by Dick Sebast, it is the sequel to United Artists/Aurora Productions' 1982 animated film, The Secret of NIMH. The plot, unrelated to Racso and the Rats of NIMH, the sequel to the book on which the original film was based, follows Timothy Brisby, the youngest son of Mrs. Brisby and her late husband, travels to Thorn Valley, hoping to become a hero like his father. There, he meets a young female mouse named Jenny and learns that the mice presumed dead during the NIMH escape are still alive, so they mount a rescue operation. It features six original songs written by Lee Holdridge and Richard Sparks, and an original musical orchestral score also composed by Holdridge.

The Secret of NIMH 2: Timmy to the Rescue was released by MGM Home Entertainment (through Warner Home Video) on December 22, 1998. Unlike the first film, the sequel used digital ink and paint. Created without the support or input of the first film's director Don Bluth, it was panned by critics.

== Plot ==
A prophecy tells how one of the children of Mrs. Brisby and her late husband, Jonathan, will save Thorn Valley from NIMH. Brisby's youngest son, Timothy, is chosen, but his older brother, Martin, believes he should have been. Martin decides to prove his worth and goes off to find his own adventure. Jeremy, the long-time acquaintance of the Brisby family, flies Timmy to Thorn Valley. Timmy is given a great welcome by its residents and becomes a student to Justin, the leader of the Rats of NIMH, and Mr. Ages. Over the years, Timmy is trained to overcome any challenge by adapting, improvising and thinking on his feet. Timmy hopes to become a great hero like his father, but has trouble listening to orders and thinking things through.

During a scavenger mission, Timmy meets a female mouse named Jenny McBride, whose parents were two of the mice that tried to escape from NIMH but were thought to have died; she explains that the mice survived, but have been trapped ever since, and that the institute is preparing an unknown plan that will occur on the next full moon. Thorn Valley's council declares it would be too dangerous to save the mice, but Timmy decides to help Jenny after learning that Martin has also been captured. They escape with a makeshift hot air balloon and begin their rescue mission. Timmy and Jenny are attacked by a hawk and crash into the forest, where they meet a caterpillar con artist named Cecil, who scares the hawk away.

Seeking help, the group visit the Great Owl but instead find Jeremy posing as the Great Owl. Timmy and Jenny learn that Cecil has teamed up with Jeremy to trick the forest animals into paying them money; when their scheme is exposed, they escape with Timmy and Jenny in tow and travel to NIMH. Timmy and Jenny sneak inside and find that the institute's experiments are turning rats and other creatures into obedient minions, while the human scientists are becoming animalistic.

Timmy and Jenny are reunited with Justin and the rats, who have come to help. Timmy is tasked to stand guard, but abandons his post to find Martin, causing everyone to be captured by a corrupted pair of stray cats, Muriel and Floyd. Timmy, Jenny and the others are taken to the head scientist, Doctor Joseph Valentine, only to find Martin is the true mastermind. Following his capture, Valentine turned Martin insane with his brainwashing device, but with his heightened intelligence, Martin then brainwashed Valentine and the others. Martin plans to use an army of lab rats riding a flock of pigeons to take over Thorn Valley and asks Timmy to join him, but he refuses. Timmy is detained, while Martin drags Jenny away to make her his queen and has the rats locked away.

Timmy blames himself for the situation until Cecil returns and encourages him not to lose hope. Timmy escapes, traps Muriel and Floyd, and goes to rescue Jenny while Cecil frees the rats. Timmy saves Jenny, defeats Martin and tricks his army into flying in the wrong direction.

Timmy and Jenny leave to find the others, only to find that a fire has broken out. The survivors flee, while Timmy goes back to save Martin, but not before he and Jenny profess their love for each other. On the way to Martin, Timmy is attacked by Muriel and Floyd, but he sends them down an elevator shaft to their deaths. Timmy finds Martin and they escape through the lab's skylight with some help from Jeremy, who then takes the group to safety. They return to Thorn Valley, where Martin has regained his sanity, as Timmy receives a hero's welcome from its citizens and his family now that the prophecy has been fulfilled.

== Cast ==
- Ralph Macchio as Timothy "Timmy" Brisby
  - Andrew Ducote as the ten year old Timmy
  - Alexander Strange as the thirteen year old Timmy
- Hynden Walch as Jenny McBride
- Dom DeLuise as Jeremy
- Meshach Taylor as Cecil
- Phillip Glasser as Martin Brisby
  - Phillip Van Dyke as the young Martin
  - Eric Idle as the corrupted Martin
- William H. Macy as Justin
- Arthur Malet as Mr. Ages
- Andrea Martin as Muriel
- Harvey Korman as Floyd
- Debi Mae West as Mrs. Brisby
- Doris Roberts as Auntie Shrew
- Steve Mackall as Doctor Joseph Valentine
- Darlene Carr as Helen
- Jamie Cronin as Teresa Brisby
- Whitney Claire Kaufman as Cynthia Brisby
- Jameson Parker as Troy
- Kevin Michael Richardson as Brutus
- Neil Ross as Doctor Valentine's assistant
- Peter MacNicol as the narrator in the opening sequence

== Reception ==
Upon its release, the film was universally panned by both critics and fans of the original film. Entertainment Weekly's Marc Bernardin gave the sequel a C− grade and said: "Alas, this Bluth-less direct-to-tape sequel [...], about a mouse's transformation from misfit to hero, has none of the original's heart or craft, and all of the sappy songwriting and patchwork plotting common to further adventures". The Chicago Tribune's Harlene Ellin gave it one and a half stars out of four, adding that "the uninspired continuation [...] clearly wasn't worth the wait". The Radio Times panned the film's "sub-Saturday morning level of animation and art design", the "surprisingly grim tone", the "frenzied pace" and "extremely choppy" writing. TV Guide gave the film two stars out of four.

== Music ==
The Secret of NIMH 2: Timmy to the Rescue

Soundtrack album by various artists
- Released: November 17, 1998
- Genre: Soundtrack
- Length: 59:03
- Label: Sonic Images Records
- Producers: Lee Holdridge, Richard Sparks

The music for Timmy to the Rescue was composed by Lee Holdridge with lyrics by Richard Sparks, with an official soundtrack album released on compact disc on November 17, 1998 by Sonic Images. It contains 17 tracks featuring instrumental themes from the film performed by the Philharmonic Orchestra of London & Venezuela, including six vocal songs by various cast members.

=== Songs ===
All lyrics are written by Richard Sparks; all music is composed by Lee Holdridge.

No.	Title	Performer(s)	Length
1.	"Come Make the Most of Your Life"	Andrew Ducote, Dom DeLuise, Arthur Malet & Chorus	2:56
2.	"I Will Show the World"	Andrew Ducote, Alexander Strange & Ralph Macchio	2:24
3.	"Magic Mystery Show"	Meshach Taylor, Dom DeLuise, Ralph Macchio & Hynden Walch	2:30
4.	"Just Say Yes!"	Eric Idle	2:42
5.	"All I Had is Gone"	Ralph Macchio & Hynden Walch	1:59
6.	"My Life and My Love"	Al Jarreau & Bobbi Page	3:05
