= A Report from Group 17 =

1972 novel by Robert C. O'Brien

- First edition
- Author: Robert C. O'Brien
- Language: English
- Genre: Science fiction
- Publisher: Atheneum Books
- Publication date: March 1972
- Publication place: United States
- Media type: Hardcover
- Pages: 223 in hardcover
- ISBN: 9780689104459

A Report from Group 17, published in 1972, is a science-fiction thriller written by Robert Leslie Conly under his pen name Robert C. O'Brien. Set in Washington, D.C., during the Cold War, the story deals particularly with the danger of developing bioweapons. The potential cause of conflict is a resurgence of Nazism in Europe. A 12-year-old girl who lives near a Soviet estate in Maryland becomes a victim of intrigue when she is kidnapped for use as an experimental subject. Themes include the threat of modern war to human survival, the moral responsibility of scientists, and the importance of both individual freedom and sympathetic instincts. Following two novels for children, A Report from Group 17 was the first of two dystopian novels that O'Brien wrote for adults. His last novel, Z for Zachariah (1974), depicts a conflict between two survivors of a nuclear war and deals with similar themes.

== Plot ==
12-year-old Allison Adam lives with her mother and 2 brothers in an isolated farmhouse by Seneca Lake (a reservoir that was being planned at the time O'Brien wrote his story) near Washington D.C. Every day after school, Allie stops by the walled grounds of Villa Petrograd, property of the Soviet embassy, and climbs a tree to view monkeys at a small zoo there. Fond of animals, Allie is troubled that the monkeys keep dying mysteriously. Unknown to her, the embassy holds the secret research lab of Helmuth Schutz, a former Nazi now developing bioweapons for the Soviets—specifically, mutations of the bacteria coryna and anthracis. Discovering Allie's spying, Schutz lures her into the compound by leaving a gate open and then kidnaps her for experiments. When her bike is later found near the Potomac River upstream from dangerous rapids, the police assume she fell in accidentally and drowned. Only Allie's 5-year-old brother Willis knows where she went, but he has promised her to keep it secret.

Meanwhile, the eminent biochemist Fergus O'Neil is recruited by the U.S. State Department, to study stolen Soviet reports from Schutz's Group 17, and investigate his activities at Villa Petrograd, by posing as a vacationer. After taking water samples one day, O'Neil rescues John Adam from nearly drowning, while testing the police's theory about his sister's bike accident. Sympathizing with the Adam family, and attracted to the recently widowed Mrs. Adam, O'Neil becomes personally concerned about Allie's disappearance.

Later, reading Schutz's old reports, O'Neil notices an obscure reference to the Steinkopf (Stone Head) Syndrome. Through research, he learns of Schutz's interest in a native Peruvian society that had lived in a hidden valley of the Andes, but died out after their water supply was contaminated with a mutagen. The name "steinkopf" refers to a giant stone head the natives built to propitiate their mountain god, in the hope he would lift the curse upon them. The name also describes the natives' affliction, a condition of utter passivity that left them dependent on instructions for all of their activities. (The mutagen makes people unable to exert themselves except under orders.) O'Neil discovers that throughout Schutz's reports there are hidden notes about private experiments to develop polywater with this mutagenic effect. These experiments continue a Nazi project to turn enemies of the Aryan "master race" into subservient Untermensch. After nightmares about Schutz experimenting on chimpanzees, O'Neil also suspects Schutz kidnapped Allie, because he needed a human subject for his private experiments.

Quitting his job, so he can act independently, O'Neil joins an off-duty policeman on a night-time raid into the Soviet compound to rescue Allie. But Schutz leaves the same night, taking Allie with him as a carrier of the polywater, and an example of its effect. Aided by an efficient network of Nazi friends, including the German Secretary of Defense, Schutz escapes back to Germany. Fortunately for Allie, he is forced to leave her in an airport when a ticket seller identifies her, and she is finally reunited with her mother. However, Allie has already become passive and emotionless, and it is unknown if her condition can be reversed. The story finishes with a brief epilogue that explains O'Neil's new job analyzing "Water X", a German expedition's "accidental" destruction of Incan ruins, and Schutz's comfortable life in Germany, where he has a new identity as a professor and his biochemical research is progressing well.

== Setting ==
As in O'Brien's Z for Zachariah, the geographical setting is unclear and largely fictitious. Events take place mainly at Seneca Lake, in the countryside about 20 miles from Washington DC. At one end of the lake are the walled grounds of Villa Petrograd, an estate owned by the Soviet embassy and considered Russian soil. The Adam family's farm is on a hill up a rough gravel road from the estate. From the gate Allison Adam enters, the hill is to the left, and the road to the right continues parallel to the estate's wall until it ends in a marshy area that borders the Potomac River. According to Colonel Attenborough, Seneca Lake is upstream from the Great Falls of the Potomac. The Little Seneca Reservoir in Montgomery County was created by one of two dams built in the 1980s to provide backup water sources for times of low flow in the Potomac. The author's family lived on a small farm beside the Potomac and near Leesburg, Virginia.

== Literary significance and reception ==
A 1972 Kirkus review described A Report from Group 17 as a thriller similar to Michael Crichton's The Andromeda Strain. It was also chosen by the Book of the Month Club.

The author Adam Cadre stated that the protagonist in his 1998 story Photopia was inspired by O'Brien's technique in A Report from Group 17 of depicting the main character primarily from the viewpoints of those who care about her: Allie Adam has a far diminished role after chapter 6 due to being captured and drugged.

Unlike O'Brien's other novels, A Report from Group 17 is told from multiple points of view that often alternate. The most common viewpoint is that of Fergus O'Neil, but other point-of-view characters include the callous Dr. Schutz, his sadistic assistant Georg, and minor characters such as a bus driver. The third-person narrator himself is detached, expressing no feelings or judgments.
