= R-T, Margaret, and the Rats of NIMH =

1990 novel by Jane Leslie Conly

- First edition
- Author: Jane Leslie Conly
- Illustrator: Leonard B. Lubin
- Language: English
- Series: Rats of NIMH series
- Genre: Children, fantasy novel
- Publisher: Harper & Row
- Publication date: 1990
- Publication place: United States
- Media type: Print (hardback & paperback)
- Pages: 260
- ISBN: 0-06-021363-9
- OCLC: 20260193
- Preceded by: Racso and the Rats of NIMH

R-T, Margaret, and the Rats of NIMH is a 1990 children's book by Jane Leslie Conly with illustrations by Leonard Lubin. It is a sequel to the 1971 book Mrs. Frisby and the Rats of NIMH, continuing the story from the 1986 book Racso and the Rats of NIMH.

== Publication history ==
R-T, Margaret, and the Rats of NIMH, like the preceding volume, Racso and the Rats of NIMH, was written by the daughter of Robert Leslie Carroll Conly (pen name Robert C. O'Brien), the author of the original Rats of NIMH book.

== Plot summary ==
When two children, Margaret and her younger, nonverbal brother Artie ("R-T"), are lost during a camping trip, they are found by the colony of rats, specifically one named Christopher. The children help the rat community with various tasks, and Artie and Christopher become very close friends. However, when winter comes, the rats cannot shelter the children and must send them back. The children try to keep the secret of Thorn Valley, but after pressure, Margaret ends up revealing it. The story ends with a party of adults traveling to Thorn Valley to discover the rats' colony only to find an empty, apparently uninhabited plot of land with all traces of the colony removed.

The whereabouts and fate of the rats of NIMH are left unstated, though Artie does find a gift from Christopher, a picture of an arrow, presumably pointing to the new location of the colony.
