= The Long Short Cut =

1968 novel by Andrew Garve

- Front cover of 1968 edition
- Author: Andrew Garve
- Language: English
- Series: Published for the Crime Club by Collins
- Subject: Confidence trick
- Publisher: Harper & Row
- Publication date: 1968
- Publication place: United States
- Pages: 166

The Long Short Cut is a 1968 work by Andrew Garve. It was the first book printed by electronically controlled typesetting.

== Plot ==
Anthony Bliss and his glamorous collaborator Corinne Lake use a chance event to develop a money-making scheme. They happen to be at a nightclub on the night when the owner is wounded in a drive-by shooting. Called to give evidence which will convict a notorious gangster, Bliss pretends to be frightened of the gangster's associates, and agrees to testify only on condition he is given police protection and help in emigrating after the trial. Actually, he has worked out a plan to use the police protection as a means of helping a crooked financier to jump bail and get out of the country, and expects to be well paid for it.

The bulk of the book consists of the detail of the plot, which includes an account of how to obtain a genuine British passport in a fictitious name, anticipating by three years the similar and more famous account given by Frederick Forsyth in The Day of the Jackal (1971). Naturally the plot does not go smoothly, and the author delivers a very sharp last-page shock.

== Technology ==
This book was printed involving the technology of electronics.

The book producer could make edits more quickly using electronics than using the traditional method. Using the old method of the linotype machine, the cost of producing the book would be about four dollars at the time. The increased speed of the new electronic method brought down the cost.

== Bibliography ==
- Altbach, Philip Gabriel; Hoshino, Edith S. (1995). International Book Publishing: An Encyclopedia. Garland Publishing. ISBN 978-0-8153-0786-0.
- Garve, Andrew (1968). The Long Short Cut. Harper & Row.
- Kane, Joseph Nathan (1997). Famous First Facts: A Record of First Happenings, Discoveries, and Inventions in American History (fifth edition). The H.W. Wilson Company. ISBN 0-8242-0930-3.
