= Jane Leslie Conly =

American children's writer

- Born: 1948 (age 77–78)
- Education: Woodrow Wilson High School; Smith College
- Occupation: Fiction writer
- Spouse: Peter
- Children: Eliza and Will
- Parent(s): Robert C. O'Brien and Sally (née McCaslin)
- Writing career
- Genres: Children's literature, science fiction
- Notable works: Racso and the Rats of NIMH; R-T, Margaret, and the Rats of NIMH; Crazy Lady!
- Notable awards: Newbery Honor, 1994

Jane Leslie Conly (born 1948) is an American author, the daughter of author Robert C. O'Brien. She started her literary work by finishing the manuscript for her father's Z for Zachariah in 1974 after his death.

Her first own book, Racso and the Rats of NIMH, was published in 1986, and is a sequel to her father's Mrs. Frisby and the Rats of NIMH.

== Education ==
Conly graduated from Woodrow Wilson High School in 1966 and from Smith College in 1971.

== Personal life ==
Conly lives in Baltimore, Maryland with her family: Peter, her husband; Eliza, her daughter; and Will, her son.

== Awards ==
- 1994 Newbery Honor for Crazy Lady!
- 2012–2012 Dorothy Canfield Fisher Children's Book Award Master List for Murder Afloat

== Works ==
- 1986: Racso and the Rats of NIMH, illustrated by Leonard Lubin (Harper & Row) – Children's Choice IRA, 1987
- 1990: R-T, Margaret, and the Rats of NIMH, illus. Leonard Lubin – Children's Choice IRA, 1990
- 1993: Crazy Lady! – Newbery Honor Book, ALA Best Books for Young Adults, 1994
- 1995: Trout Summer – ALA Best Books for Young Adults, 1996
- 1998: While No One Was Watching
- 1999: What Happened on Planet Kid
- 2002: The Rudest Alien on Earth
- 2005: In the Night, on Lanvale Street
- 2008: Impetuous R, Secret Agent, illus. Bonnie Leck
- 2010: Murder Afloat
