= The Silver Crown =

1968 novel by Robert C. O'Brien

- First edition
- Author: Robert C. O'Brien
- Illustrator: Dale Payson
- Language: English
- Genre: Children's science fiction
- Published: 1968 (Atheneum Books)
- Publication place: United States
- Media type: Print
- Pages: 274 (first edition)
- OCLC: 437126
- LC Class: PZ7.O135 Si

The Silver Crown is a children's science-fiction book by Robert C. O'Brien. Published in 1968, it was his first novel.

== Plot summary ==
The story is in the third person limited perspective, showing events as experienced by the protagonist, Ellen Carroll. The book opens when Ellen discovers a mysterious silver crown in her bedroom on her tenth birthday. This initiates a series of events which at first seem unrelated. Later that morning, her house burns down while she is out at the park and she witnesses a murder. Thrown on her own resources by the loss of her family, Ellen decides to hitchhike to her Aunt Sarah in Kentucky.

On the way, she escapes from a kidnapper, is chased though the woods, and finds an ally in 8-year-old Otto. With Otto, she treks through the mountains, while being hunted by sinister men. At a black castle in the forest, Ellen encounters a medieval device called the Hieronymus Machine which is mind-controlling people and turning them into arsonists and assassins for an unknown purpose. The machine can be operated by two crowns, one black and one silver. It seems that only Ellen can activate the silver crown, the more powerful of the two. Ellen decides the Machine is too dangerous and, despite the temptation of becoming a queen, has it destroyed.

== Revised final chapter ==
In the original version, one of the adult characters speculates that the Machine was responsible for sending the crown to Ellen and arranged events to draw her to the castle. This explanation ties up loose ends for the reader. O'Brien later revised the ending of the novel for the British edition to eliminate this section; Ellen's Aunt Sarah simply says she found the crown at "a little curio shop in Barcelona", with no apparent link to the Hieronymus Machine.

== Influences ==
The "Hieronymus" in the book is a reference to St. Jerome; in the book's invented history, some of his followers drifted into occult sciences and built the Hieronymus Machine "many centuries ago in a monastery in Spain". Later, though, it was stated to be built by another Hieronymus c. 1000 AD, centuries after the actual St. Jerome. There is no basis for this in actual history. An American inventor Thomas Galen Hieronymus built a machine which he named a "Hieronymus machine" in 1949, the same year given in the novel for the discovery of the device by an archaeologist in Spain. However, his machine merely detected radiation supposedly emitted by all living things; it had nothing to do with mind control.

== Reception ==
Kirkus Reviews observed "That Mr. Arthur's nightmare of thought control requires eight pages of explanation at the end is symptomatic of a fundamental failure ... [M]uch of what happens to her [Ellen] seems, even in retrospect, unnecessarily outlandish, and the connection with actuality is crude". In contrast, Andre Norton Award winner E. C. Myers said about The Silver Crown: "It may have been one of the first stories I read that straddled the line between fantasy and science fiction and deftly subverted readers' expectations" and "he left a lasting impression on generations of readers".
