= Behavioral sink =

Collapse in behavior due to overcrowding

Behavioral sink is a term invented by ethologist John B. Calhoun to describe a purported collapse in behavior that can result from overpopulation. The term and concept derive from a series of overpopulation experiments Calhoun conducted on brown rats between 1958 and 1962. In the experiments, Calhoun and his researchers created a series of "rat utopias" – enclosed spaces where rats were given unlimited access to food and water, enabling unfettered population growth. Calhoun coined the term behavioral sink in a February 1, 1962, Scientific American article titled "Population Density and Social Pathology". He later performed similar experiments on mice from 1968 to 1972.

Calhoun's work became used as an animal model of societal collapse, and his study has become a touchstone of urban sociology and psychology in general.

== Experiments ==
Calhoun's early experiments with rats were carried out on farmland at Rockville, Maryland, starting in 1947.

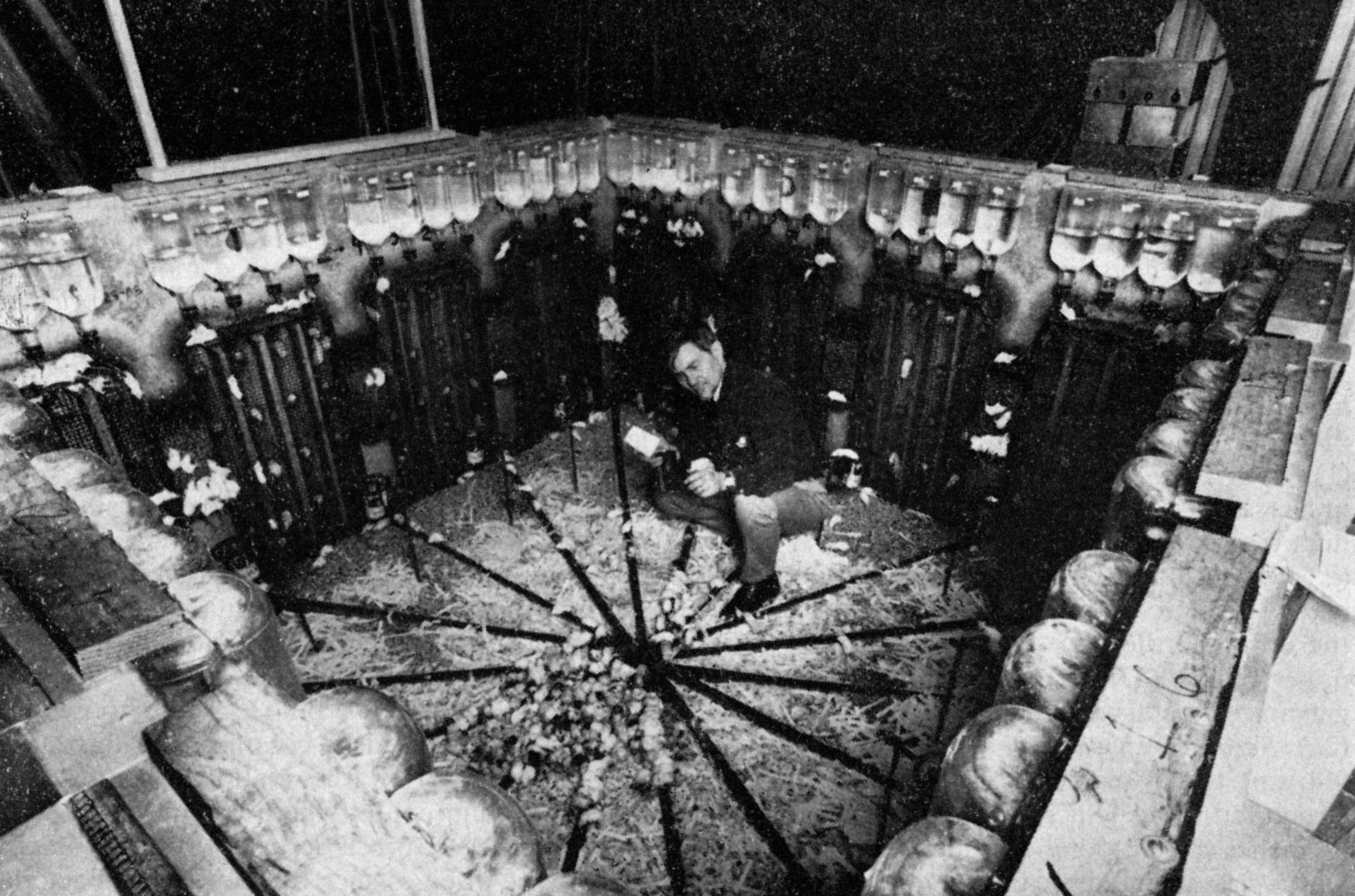
John Calhoun (age 52) with 'rat utopia' experiment (1970).

While Calhoun was working at the National Institute of Mental Health (NIMH) in 1954, he began numerous experiments with rats and mice. During his first tests, he placed around 34 to 55 rats in a 10-by-14-foot (3.0 m × 4.3 m) cage in a barn in Montgomery County. He separated the space into four rooms. Every room was specifically created to support a dozen matured brown Norwegian rats. Rats could maneuver between the rooms by using the ramps. Since Calhoun provided unlimited resources, such as water, food, and also protection from predators as well as from disease and weather, the rats were said to be in "rat utopia" or "mouse paradise", another psychologist explained.

In the 1962 study, Calhoun described the behavior as follows:

Many [female rats] were unable to carry the pregnancy to full term or to survive delivery of their litters if they did. An even greater number, after successfully giving birth, fell short in their maternal functions. Among the males the behavior disturbances ranged from sexual deviation to cannibalism and from frenetic overactivity to a pathological withdrawal from which individuals would emerge to eat, drink and move about only when other members of the community were asleep. The social organization of the animals showed equal disruption.

The common source of these disturbances became most dramatically apparent in the populations of our first series of three experiments, in which we observed the development of what we called a behavioral sink. The animals would crowd together in greatest number in one of the four interconnecting pens in which the colony was maintained. As many as 60 of the 80 rats in each experimental population would assemble in one pen during periods of feeding. Individual rats would rarely eat except in the company of other rats. As a result extreme population densities developed in the pen adopted for eating, leaving the others with sparse populations.

In the experiments in which the behavioral sink developed, infant mortality ran as high as 96 percent among the most disoriented groups in the population.

Following his earlier experiments with rats, Calhoun later created his "Mortality-Inhibiting Environment for Mice" in 1968: a 101-by-101-inch (260 cm × 260 cm) cage for mice with food and water replenished to support any increase in population, which took his experimental approach to its limits. In his most famous experiment in the series, "Universe 25", population peaked at 2,200 mice even though the habitat was built to tolerate a total population of 4,000. Having reached a level of high population density, the mice began exhibiting a variety of abnormal, often destructive behaviors, including refusal to engage in courtship, and females abandoning their young. By the 600th day, the population was on its way to extinction. Though physically able to reproduce, the mice had lost the social skills required to mate.

Calhoun retired from NIMH in 1984, but continued to work on his research results until his death on September 7, 1995.

== Analysis ==
The specific voluntary crowding of rats to which the term behavioral sink refers is thought to have resulted from the earlier involuntary crowding: individual rats became so used to the proximity of others while eating that they began to associate feeding with the company of other rats. Calhoun eventually found a way to prevent this by changing some of the settings and thereby decreased mortality somewhat, but the overall pathological consequences of overcrowding remained.

Further, researchers argued that "Calhoun's work was not simply about density in a physical sense, as number of individuals-per-square-unit-area, but was about degrees of social interaction." "Social density" appears to be key.

Some scientists questioned the methodologies used in Calhoun's experiments. Jon Day writes:

[H]is experiments have never been successfully replicated by other researchers, and wild colonies of rats don't seem to display any of the personality types he so vividly described. He rarely published in mainstream scientific journals, saying that his concerns were so pressing that he didn't have time to wait for peer review. It seems plausible that Calhoun was responsible for creating the conditions for population collapse. He only cleaned out Universe 25 every six to eight weeks; disease and parasitism could account for many of the phenomena he thought were due to mere proximity.

== Applicability to humans ==
Calhoun had phrased much of his work in anthropomorphic terms, in a way that made his ideas highly accessible to a lay audience.

John Calhoun himself saw the fate of the population of mice as a metaphor for the potential fate of humankind. He characterized the social breakdown as a "spiritual death", with reference to bodily death as the "second death" mentioned in the Biblical verse Revelation 2:11.

Calhoun's worries primarily concerned a human population surge and a potentially independent increase in urbanization as an early stage of rendering much of a given society functionally sterile. Under such circumstances, he hypothesized, society would move from some modality of overpopulation towards a much more irredeemable underpopulation.

The implications of the experiment are controversial. Psychologist Jonathan Freedman's experiment recruited high school and university students to carry out a series of experiments that measured the effects of density on human behavior. He measured their stress, discomfort, aggression, competitiveness, and general unpleasantness. He declared to have found no appreciable negative effects in 1975.

The 1962 Scientific American article came at a time when overpopulation had become a subject of great public interest, and had a considerable cultural influence. However, such discussions often oversimplified the original findings in various ways. It should however be noted that the work has another message than, for example, Paul Ehrlich's now widely disputed book The Population Bomb.

Some scientists considered the aforementioned methodological flaws as compounding the inaccuracy of implications drawn from his experiments.

== See also ==
- Decadence
- Dysgenics
- Mrs. Frisby and the Rats of NIMH
- Overpopulation
- Population decline
- Rats of NIMH
- Societal collapse
- Tang ping

== Sources ==
- Day, Jon (July 24, 2025). "The Beautiful Ones". London Review of Books. Vol. 47, no. 13.
