= Mrs. Frisby and the Rats of NIMH =

1971 novel by Robert C. O'Brien

- First-edition cover with Zina Bernstein's artwork
- Author: Robert C. O'Brien
- Illustrator: Zena Bernstein
- Series: Rats of NIMH
- Genre: Science fiction, children, fantasy novel
- Published: 1971 Atheneum Books
- Media type: Print
- Pages: 233
- ISBN: 0-689-86220-2 (second Aladdin paperback edition, 1999)
- OCLC: 52814814
- LC Class: PZ10.3 O19 Mi
- Followed by: Racso and the Rats of NIMH

Mrs. Frisby and the Rats of NIMH is a 1971 children's science fiction/fantasy book by Robert C. O'Brien, with illustrations by Zena Bernstein. The novel was published by the Los Angeles publishing house Atheneum Books.

This book was the winner of numerous awards including the 1972 Newbery Medal. Ten years following its publication, the story was adapted for film as The Secret of NIMH (1982).

The novel revolves around a colony of escaped lab rats—the rats of NIMH—who live in a technologically sophisticated and literate society mimicking that of humans. They come to the aid of Mrs. Frisby, a widowed field mouse who seeks to protect her children and home from destruction by a farmer's plow.

The rats of NIMH were inspired by the research of John B. Calhoun on mouse and rat population dynamics at the National Institute of Mental Health from the 1940s to the 1960s.

After O'Brien's death in 1973, his daughter Jane Leslie Conly wrote two sequels to Mrs. Frisby and the Rats of NIMH.

== Plot summary ==
Mrs. Frisby, a recently widowed mouse, lives with her four children in a cinder block in a field belonging to a farmer named Mr. Fitzgibbon. Her son Timothy falls ill with pneumonia just as the farmer begins planning for spring plowing, which will destroy their home. Normally, the family would move to their summer home to avoid being uprooted, but Timothy is too ill to make the journey. An older mouse named Mr. Ages, who was a friend of Mrs. Frisby's late husband Jonathan, gives her some medicine for Timothy. On her way home, she saves the life of a young crow named Jeremy from the farmer's cat, Dragon. In return, Jeremy flies Mrs. Frisby to an owl's tree so that she can ask for help moving her family. When the owl finds out that Mrs. Frisby is the widow of his old friend Jonathan, he suggests that she seek help from the rats who live in a rosebush on the farm.

Frisby discovers that the rats have a literate and mechanized society. They have technology such as elevators, have tapped into the electrical grid to provide lighting and heating, and have acquired other human skills, such as storing food for the winter. Their leader, Nicodemus, tells Frisby of the rats' capture by scientists working for a laboratory located at the National Institute of Mental Health (NIMH) and the experiments that were performed on the rats, which increased the rats' intelligence to the point of being able to read, write and operate complicated machines, as well as enhancing their longevity and strength. Their increased intelligence and strength allowed them to escape from NIMH and migrate to their present location on the farm. Jonathan and Mr. Ages were the only two survivors of a group of eight mice who had been part of the experiments at NIMH and made the rats' escape possible.

Out of respect for Jonathan, the rats agree to move Frisby's house to a location safe from the plow. Nicodemus also tells Frisby that the rats have recently decided to abandon their lifestyle of dependence on humans, which some rats regard as theft. Instead, the rats aim to live independently. A group of rats, led by one named Jenner, rejected this plan and left the nest at some point before Frisby's arrival.

In order for the rats to move the Frisby home, the cat Dragon must be drugged, but the rats are too big to accomplish it. Mrs. Frisby volunteers to go, even though she learns that Jonathan was killed by Dragon while attempting to drug him. She is caught by the farmer's son, Billy, who puts her in a birdcage. While captured, Frisby overhears the farmer and his family discussing an incident at a nearby hardware store in which a group of rats was electrocuted after seemingly attempting to steal a small motor. This has attracted the attention of a group of men who have offered to exterminate the rats on the farmer's land free of charge. At night, the rat Justin comes to save Frisby and manages to get her out of the cage. The rats manage to move the Frisby house out of the way of the plow using a pulley and scaffolding system.

The successful house move allows the mouse family to remain so that Timothy has time to recover before moving to their summer home. Mrs. Frisby warns the rats of what she learned while captured; they assume that the rats at the hardware store were Jenner's group, and that the group of men were from NIMH and are looking for them specifically. To fool the exterminators, the rats get rid of all their human-like technology and make their tunnels under the rosebush look like a normal rats' nest. As the others move, ten rats stay behind so the exterminators will not think the rat hole has been abandoned. When the exterminators fill the rat hole with poisonous gas, eight of the ten rats manage to escape, while the remaining two die in the hole. Once Timothy recovers, Frisby and her family move to their summer home.

== Reception ==
=== Critical response ===
Since its release, Mrs. Frisby and the Rats of NIMH has received widespread praise from scholars, critics of children's literature, and children themselves. In 1985, Alethea K Helbig called Mrs. Frisby "a combination of science fiction and animal fantasy" that described "fantastic situations with scientific accuracy". Scholar Paula T. Connolly noted the book for Conly's "gradations of moral understanding and culpability" while dealing with "such problematic issues as the roles of science and technology, identity, idealism, family life, forms of community and means of survival".

In a paper titled "The Critical Reader in Children's Metafiction", literary scholar Joe Sanders wrote that the book's emphasis on the rats' abilities to read mirrors the "growing reading abilities of the novel's own target audience". Sanders argues that the book portrays "the act of reading" as "clearly liberatory". Reading allows the rats to create a thriving human-like society after escaping from NIMH. Furthermore, reading serves as a gateway for the rats to discover that humans dislike them because they steal. Sanders added that "scientific and philosophical treatises help the rats understand what their role is in the world and that if they are to be anything more than thieves, they must become a self-sustaining community". In essence, Sanders finds that O'Brien promotes reading as an empowering tool which is an important lesson that children learn through reading this book.

In a retrospective essay about the Newbery Medal–winning books from 1966 to 1975, children's author John Rowe Townsend wrote: "It seems to me that the fact that all the animals talk and behave intelligently from the beginning of the story detracts from the spectacular development of the laboratory rats... Mrs. Frisby and the Rats of NIMH is a pleasing book, but I find it mildly frustrating; it might have been something more than it is".

In 2012 it was ranked number 33 on a list of the top 100 children's novels published by School Library Journal.

=== Awards ===
Mrs. Frisby and the Rats of NIMH won numerous awards, including the Lewis Carroll Shelf Award, the Newbery Medal, and the runner-up National Book Award in 1972; the Mark Twain Award in 1973; the Pacific Northwest Library Association Young Readers' Choice Award and the William Allen White Children's Book Award in 1974.

=== Impact on American views of scientific technology ===
In a 2019 essay, American studies scholar Arahshiel Rose Silver wrote that Mrs. Frisby and the Rats of NIMH "reflect the many scientific and technological anxieties present in 1960s American culture". During this period, scientific advancements–especially in the field of genetics–increased fears about the pervasiveness of technology in everyday life. A culture of fear began to grow surrounding unethical medical and scientific practices, which are heavily reflected in the book. Silver argued that Conly's book lays out an example of technological development ending poorly, giving both children reading the book and their parents a lot to think about.

== Related works ==
After the death of O'Brien, his daughter, Jane Leslie Conly, wrote two other novels based on the rats of NIMH. Racso and the Rats of NIMH (1986) tells the story of a city rat who runs away to join the new colony, befriending Timothy, while saving the colony from a flood along the way. In R-T, Margaret, and the Rats of NIMH (1990), the rats rescue two lost human children who in turn help to save the colony before winter. Constance Vidor commented that "Conly's books continue her father's emphasis on the theme of social responsibility while weaving in new characters with more personal problems".

== Adaptations ==
=== 1972 dramatization ===
In 1972, Miller-Brody Productions recorded a dramatization of the book for Newbery Award Records. Narrated by William Griffis, the dramatization featured Joan Shepard as Mrs. Frisby, Lionel Wilson as Nicodemus, Jack Grimes as Justin, Pierre Cache as Mr. Ages, Earl Hammond as Brutus, Libby Crane as Theresa and Corinne Orr as Mrs. Fitzgibbon.

=== 1982 version ===
In 1982, the animated film The Secret of NIMH was released, directed by Don Bluth; it was his first feature film outside of Walt Disney Animation Studios. The film adds a mystical element completely absent from the novel, with Nicodemus portrayed as a wise, bearded old wizard with magic powers and an enchanted amulet, rather than as an equal of the other rats. The character of Jenner is made a villain who is still present with the rats, rather than having left them before the story begins. The crow Jeremy has much greater prominence as comic relief in the film than he has in the book. Additionally, the Frisby family name was changed to "Brisby" to avoid trademark infringement with the Frisbee.

=== Live-action/animated reboot ===
In 2009, Paramount Pictures set Neil Burger to write the script and Cary Granat to produce the film based on the book. Nothing has materialised since and the rights to the book lapsed.

In 2015, MGM, which had released the 1982 film, acquired the rights to the book to adapt it into a live-action/animated film. Michael Berg was set to adapt it, while Daniel Bobker and Ehren Kruger were attached to produce.

The Russo brothers were set as executive producers of the remake as of April 2019.

=== Television series ===
A television series based on the books was in development at Fox as an event series in September 2021.

== See also ==
- Behavioral sink — Calhoun's research on rats at NIMH that inspired the book
- Flowers for Algernon — Experiments on the eponymous mouse of this tale form the basis of the procedure which increases the intelligence of the story's protagonist.

Awards
Preceded by Summer of the Swans	Newbery Medal recipient 1972	Succeeded by Julie of the Wolves
Preceded by Sounder	Mark Twain Award; 1973	Succeeded by It's a Mile from Here to Glory
Preceded by The Trumpet of the Swan	Joint winner of the William Allen White Children's Book Award; 1974; With: The Headless Cupid	Succeeded by Dominic
