= Robert C. O'Brien (author) =

American novelist (1918–1973)

- Born: Robert Leslie Carroll Conly; January 11, 1918; Brooklyn, New York, U.S.
- Died: March 5, 1973 (aged 55); Washington, D.C.
- Education: Bachelor of Arts in English
- Alma mater: University of Rochester
- Occupations: Writer; author; journalist
- Spouse: Sally McCaslin (m. 1943)
- Children: 4, including Jane Leslie Conly
- Writing career
- Pen name: Robert C. O'Brien
- Period: 1968–73
- Genres: Children's literature, fantasy, science fiction
- Notable works: Mrs. Frisby and the Rats of NIMH; Z for Zachariah
- Notable awards: Newbery Medal; 1972

Robert Leslie Carroll Conly (January 11, 1918 – March 5, 1973), better known by his pen name Robert C. O'Brien, was an American novelist and a journalist for National Geographic magazine. He is best known for his children's novel Mrs. Frisby and the Rats of NIMH (1971), which won the Newbery Medal 1972. His novel was later adapted to Don Bluth's animated film The Secret of NIMH (1982).

== Early life ==
Conly was born in Brooklyn, New York, the third of five children in a wealthy Irish Catholic family. With interests in music and literature, Conly entered Williams College in 1935 but left in his second year. He then went through a period that he referred to as his "breakdown", briefly working in Albany, New York, before going back to his family in disgrace. Although he later studied for a time at Juilliard, he went on to receive his Bachelor of Arts in English at the University of Rochester in 1940.

== Writings ==
=== Journalism ===
After his university graduation, Conly had a brief stint in an advertising agency, and then began working for Newsweek. He was ineligible for conscription during World War II, as unfit due to physical and mental ailments (classification 4-F in later terms). He then covered national and city news for the Washington Times-Herald beginning in 1944 and later the Pathfinder, a news magazine. In 1951, he began working as an editor and writer for National Geographic, a job which was to take him around the world. From 1970 until his death he was a senior assistant editor there.

=== Fiction writer ===
In the 1960s Conly developed glaucoma. Because he could no longer drive to work, he and his family moved in 1963 from Virginia closer to his office in Washington, D.C. In the time he saved from not having to commute, he began to write children's stories. Conly is best known for writing novels under the name "Robert C. O'Brien", from his mother's maiden name, used because his National Geographic contract "forb[ade] him from publishing with any other company".

His first books were the children's stories The Silver Crown (1968) and Mrs. Frisby and the Rats of NIMH (1971). He won the 1972 Newbery Medal for the latter and his comments at the American Library Association annual conference were read by his editor Jean Karl to preserve his anonymity. According to Sally Conly, his last two novels, A Report from Group 17 (1972) and Z for Zachariah (1974), were intended for adults. After his death in 1973, Sally and their daughter Jane finished the latter novel using his notes so it could be published posthumously. Z for Zachariah received a 1976 Edgar Award for Best Juvenile Mystery from the Mystery Writers of America.

His daughter Jane Leslie Conly later published two sequels to Mrs. Frisby and the Rats of NIMH: Racso and the Rats of NIMH (1986) and R-T, Margaret, and the Rats of NIMH (1990).

== Personal life ==
Robert Conly married Sally McCaslin in 1943. The couple had four children, three daughters and a son. The marriage lasted until his death from a heart attack thirty years later in 1973. Mrs. Conly has written about her husband under the name Sally O'Brien.

== Published books ==
All are novels published as by Robert C. O'Brien:

- The Silver Crown (Atheneum Books, 1968)
- Mrs. Frisby and the Rats of NIMH (Atheneum, 1971)
- A Report from Group 17 (Macmillan, 1972)
- Z for Zachariah (Atheneum, 1974)

Film adaptations

- The Secret of NIMH (1982) – based on the novel Mrs. Frisby and the Rats of NIMH
- The Secret of NIMH 2: Timmy to the Rescue (1998) – based on the characters from the novel Mrs. Frisby and the Rats of NIMH
- Z for Zachariah (2015) – based on the novel
