= Boardman Township, Ohio =

Township in Ohio, US

- Township
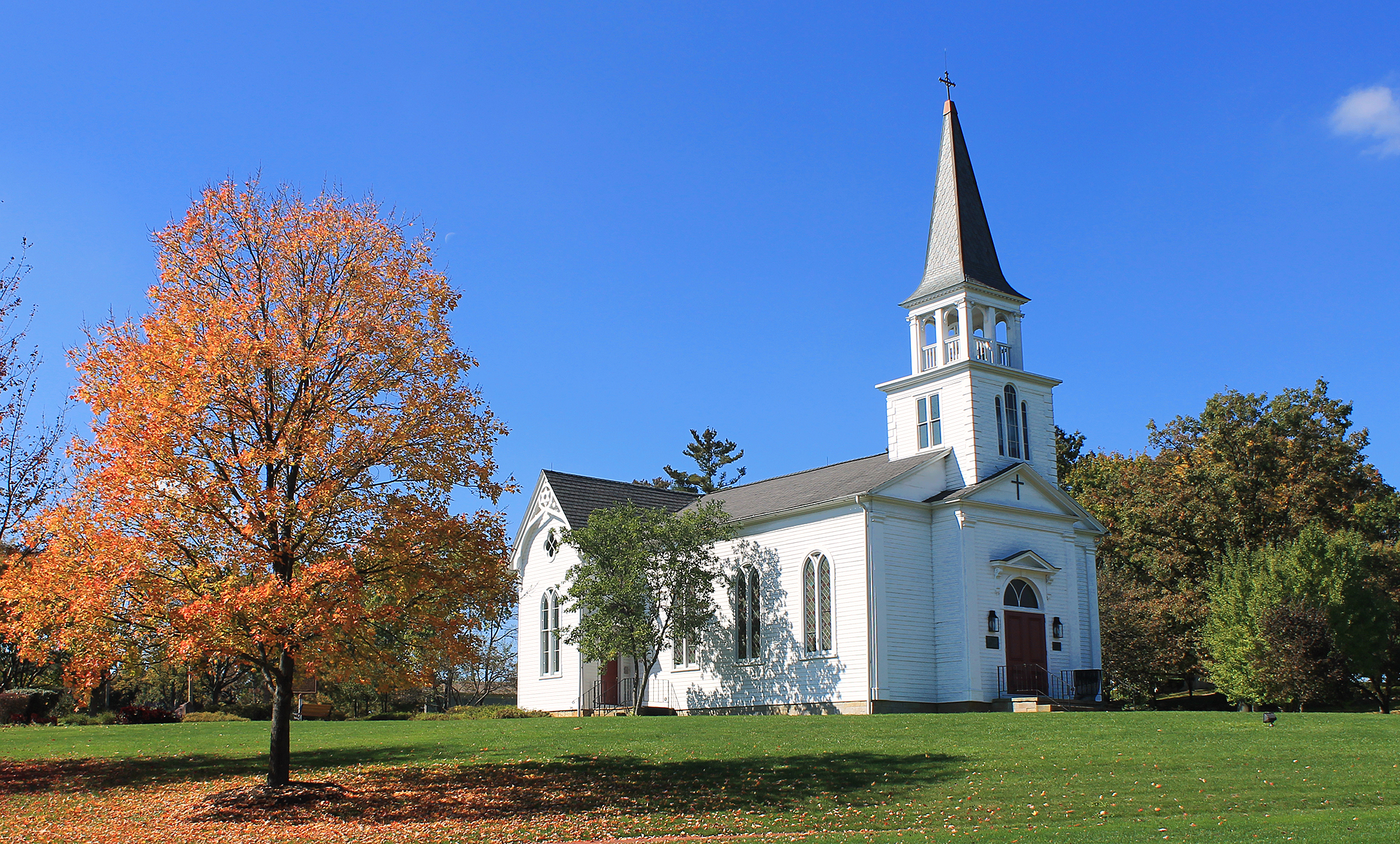
- St. James Episcopal Church in Boardman Park, built in 1828

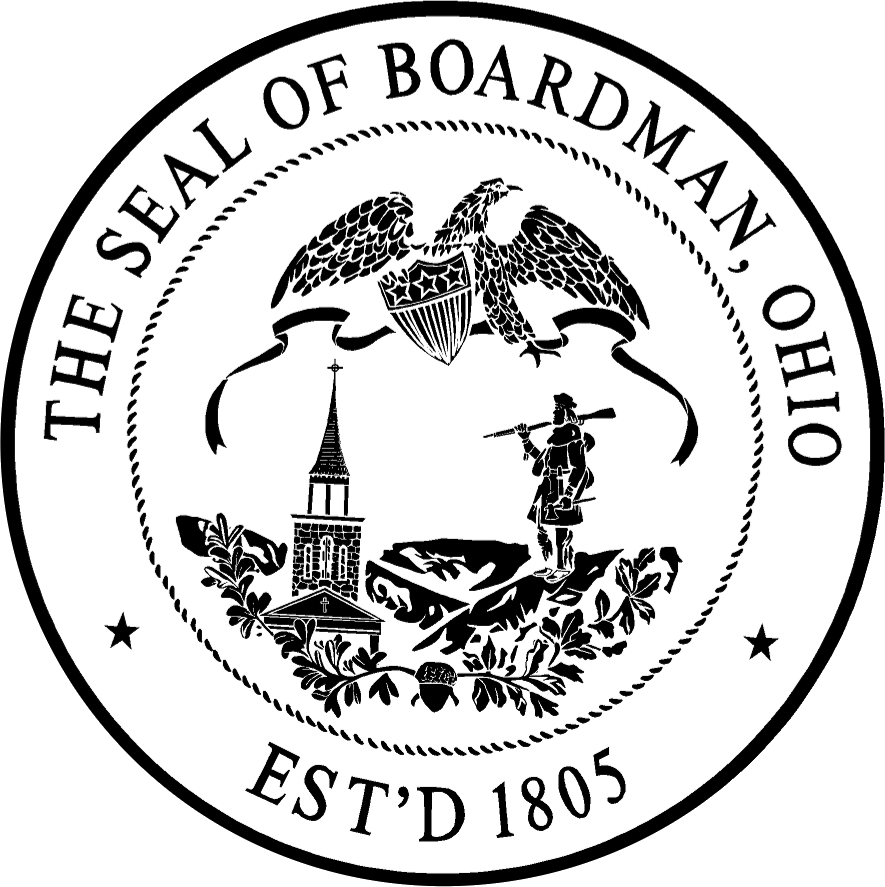
- Seal
- Motto: "A Nice Place to Call Home"
- Interactive map of Boardman Township, Ohio
- Location within Ohio Location within the United States
- Coordinates: 41°2′4″N 80°39′38″W
- Country: United States
- State: Ohio
- County: Mahoning

Government
  - Type: Board of Trustees
  - Board members: Brad Calhoun; Tom Costello; Larry Moliterno
  - Administrator: Jason Loree

Area
  - Total: 23.8 sq mi (61.6 km^{2})
  - Land: 23.5 sq mi (60.9 km^{2})
  - Water: 0.27 sq mi (0.7 km^{2})
- Elevation: 1,056 ft (322 m)

Population (2020)
  - Total: 40,213
  - Density: 1,710/sq mi (660.3/km^{2})
- Time zone: UTC-5 (Eastern (EST))
  - Summer (DST): UTC-4 (EDT)
- ZIP codes: 44511–44513
- Area codes: 234/330
- FIPS code: 39-07468
- GNIS feature ID: 1086558
- Website: boardmantwp.com

Boardman Township is one of the fourteen townships of Mahoning County, Ohio, United States. The population was 40,213 at the 2020 census. It is a suburb directly south of Youngstown and the second-largest municipality in the Youngstown–Warren metropolitan area. Home to Southern Park Mall, Boardman is a major retail hub in the region and is known for being the location of the first Arby's restaurant.

== History ==
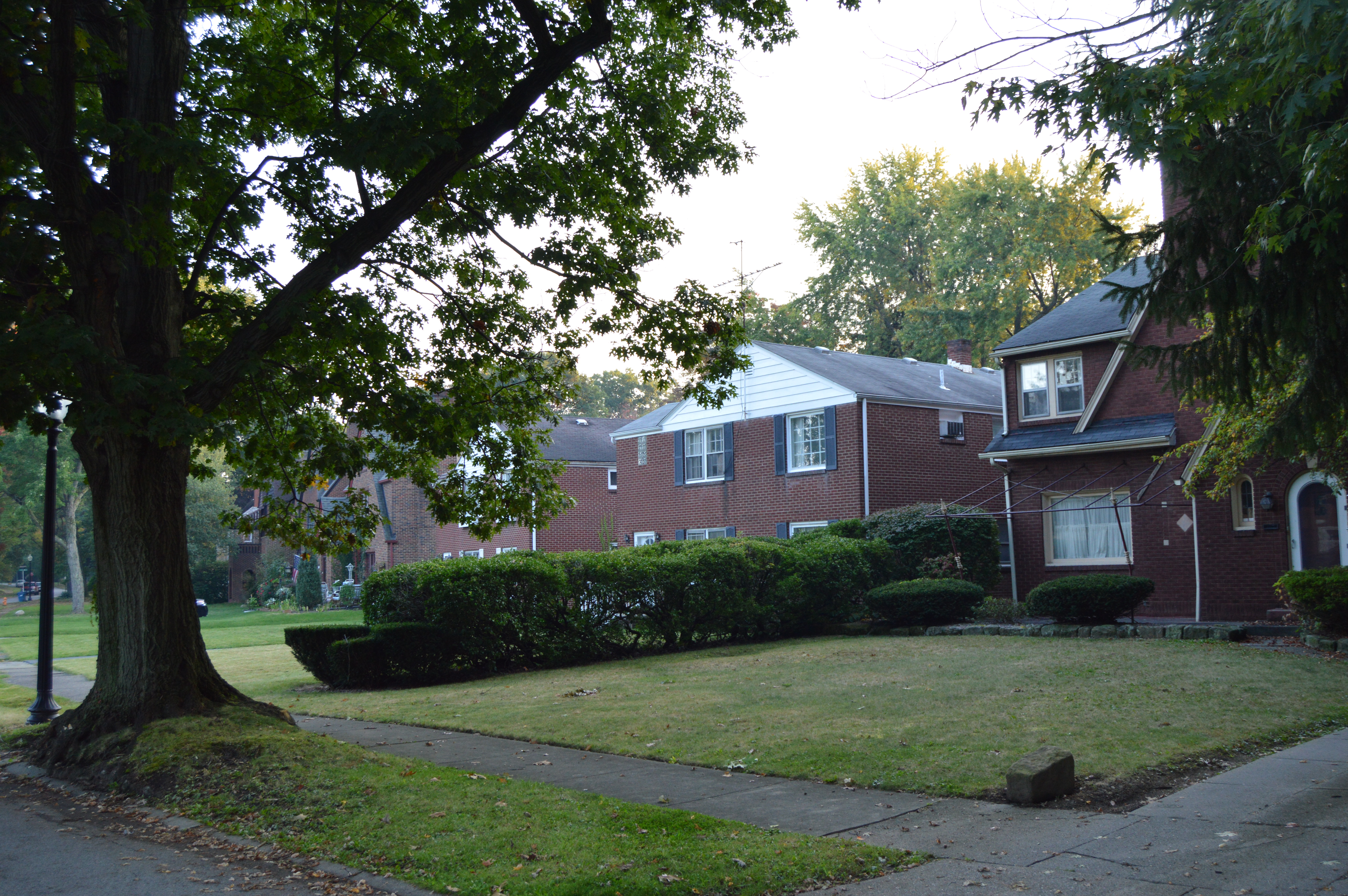
Newport Village Historic District is noted for its Tudor Revival and Colonial Revival architecture.

Boardman was founded by Elijah Boardman, a land agent of the Connecticut Land Company and later U.S. Senator, in the late 1790s as township 1, range 2 within the Connecticut Western Reserve. The township was formally established in 1806, although the township government lists it as 1805 on its seal, documents, and signage. It is the only Boardman Township statewide.

Boardman was traditionally an agricultural community with grain crops and apple orchards throughout the 19th century. Around the turn of the century, the railroad led to Southern Park, a horse racing facility on Washington Boulevard. Thus, the area was an early draw for Youngstown urbanites. Because of its agricultural nature and proximity to Youngstown, Boardman was ripe for strip development starting as early as 1950. Around this time, the northern areas of the township were developed into suburban spillover from Youngstown's south side.

Edward J. DeBartolo Sr., a shopping mall developer from Youngstown, began his company in Boardman. Boardman Plaza on U.S. Route 224 was one of the first strip malls in the country. Established in 1950 by DeBartolo, the plaza had three full-service grocery stores within a few hundred feet of each other. In 1970, DeBartolo opened the more contemporary Southern Park Mall near the intersection of US 224 and Market Street.

Also around 1950, the Youngstown Sheet and Tube Company, one of the largest steel manufacturers in the country, opened a headquarters complex in Boardman across from the DeBartolo Corporation. When the Youngstown Sheet and Tube Company closed in 1977, a large campus was left for others to develop. Today, the former headquarters is the center of the Southwoods Health medical campus as well as a branch of Youngstown State University and various restaurants.

The fast food chain Arby's opened its first location in Boardman in 1964. Directly owned and operated by the corporation, the restaurant moved to a new building in the 1990s across the street from the original building on US 224. The original building was occupied by a bird shop until 2021 and is now vacant.

The township has numerous listings on the National Register of Historic Places, including St. James Episcopal Church, the oldest structure in the township, Forest Lawn Memorial Park, Southern Park Stable, the Forest Glen Estates Historic District, the Mill Creek Park Historic District, and the Newport Village Historic District.

== Geography ==
Centered at 41°2'20" North, 80°39'55" West in the central part of the county, it borders the following townships and municipalities:

- Youngstown – north
- Struthers – northeast
- Poland Township and Poland – east
- Springfield Township – southeast
- Beaver Township – south
- Canfield Township – west
- Austintown Township – northwest corner

There are no incorporated communities within Boardman Township, although a portion of it was formerly listed as the census-designated place of Boardman until 2020. Parts of the village of Poland in the east and the city of Youngstown in the northeast occupy areas originally zoned to Boardman Township. Within Boardman, there are numerous neighborhoods, including the Newport Village Historic District.

According to the United States Census Bureau, the township has a total area of 23.8 square miles (61.6 km^{2}), of which 23.5 square miles (60.9 km^{2}) is land and 0.27 square miles (0.7 km^{2}), or 1.11%, is water.

== Demographics ==
Historical population
Census	Pop.	Note	%±
1850	1,026		—
1860	916		−10.7%
1870	817		−10.8%
1880	900		10.2%
1890	1,002		11.3%
1900	936		−6.6%
1910	1,104		17.9%
1920	2,836		156.9%
1930	5,456		92.4%
1940	7,881		44.4%
1950	13,606		72.6%
1960	27,379		101.2%
1970	36,110		31.9%
1980	41,758		15.6%
1990	41,796		0.1%
2000	42,518		1.7%
2010	40,889		−3.8%
2020	40,213		−1.7%
U.S. Decennial Census; Census - Geography Profile

According to the 2019 American Community Survey and 2020 census, there were 40,213 people, 17,477 households, and 10,171 families residing in the township. The population density was 660.3 people per sq. km. The racial makeup of the township was 83.5% White, 7.51% African American, 1.82% Asian, 0.16% American Indian, 0.02% Pacific Islander, 1.23% from other races, and 5.72% from two or more races. Hispanic or Latino of any race were 4.76% of the population.

== Economy ==
Boardman is a large, sprawling suburb. It is a busy community south of Youngstown composed of many businesses, being one of the main retail hubs of the Mahoning Valley along with the U.S. Route 422 "Strip" in Niles, Ohio.

Center court of the Southern Park Mall, (2010)

The primary corridor of development is along U.S. Route 224, with commercial space along almost the entirety of the township's length of the road except a portion zoned to Mill Creek Park. Running north-south, Ohio State Route 7 is also a primary artery of commercial development, with important centers such as the St. Elizabeth Boardman Hospital located along this route. At the intersection of Routes 7 and 224 lies Southern Park Mall, which is the largest single shopping destination in Mahoning County. Furthermore, new development is located along the South Avenue artery which parallels the southern extension of Interstate 680 between its Midlothian and Western Reserve Road exits. The location of Boardman at the meeting point of several major local roadways allows it to be a center of commercial activity amongst the southern suburbs of the Youngstown–Warren area. Nearby Southern Park is the Boardman Plaza strip mall and community center, which opened between June and October 1951 as one of Edward J. DeBartolo Corporation's early developments. As of August 2018, that mall is owned by America's Reality LLC.

Zayre location at the Boardman Plaza (1972)

Boardman abuts one of the Youngstown area's most popular attractions, Mill Creek Park. Within the park grounds, there is an 11-acre (45,000 m^{2}) rose garden, several small waterfalls, a lily pond with geese and turtles, marshlands, and Lanterman's Mill, where grain is ground daily. In addition, there is a 36-hole golf course.

== Government ==
The township is governed by a three-member board of trustees, who are elected in November of odd-numbered years to a four-year term beginning on the following January 1. Two are elected in the year after the presidential election and one is elected in the year before it. There is also an elected township fiscal officer, who serves a four-year term beginning on April 1 of the year after the election, which is held in November of the year before the presidential election. Vacancies in the fiscal officership or on the board of trustees are filled by the remaining trustees. The board employs a township administrator for day-to-day administration of township services. As of 2025, the members of the board of trustees are Brad Calhoun, Tom Costello, and Larry Moliterno, and the township administrator is Jason Loree.

== Education ==
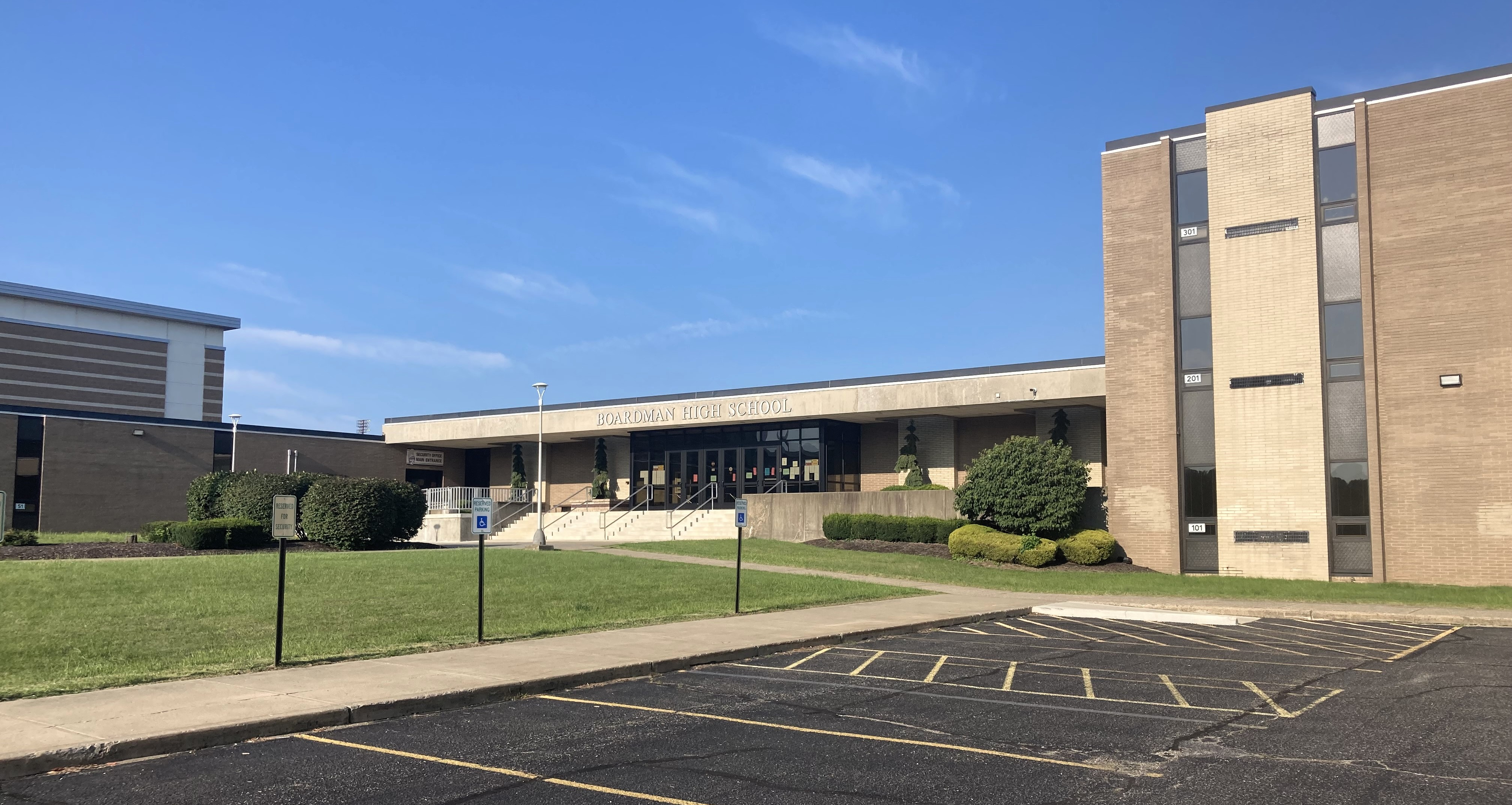
Boardman High School

The Boardman Local School District manages public education within most of the township and some surrounding areas. It consists of Boardman High School (grades 9–12), Boardman Glenwood Junior High School (grades 7–8), Boardman Center Intermediate School (grades 4–6), Robinwood Lane Elementary School, Stadium Drive Elementary School, and West Boulevard Elementary School (all K–3). Certain outlying areas of the township are managed by the Canfield Local School District, the Poland Local School District, and the Youngstown City School District.

Boardman is also home to a private school, namely the Catholic St. Charles School (grades K-8), although further private schools exist in neighborhoods of Youngstown that abut Boardman such as Valley Christian School (grades K-12) and the Montessori School of the Mahoning Valley (grades K-8).

Boardman has a public library, a branch of the Public Library of Youngstown and Mahoning County.

Located in Boardman is also the Boardman Training Center, a post-secondary education facility that focuses on preparing students for healthcare certifications in months.

== Notable people ==
- Homer C. Blake, United States Navy flag officer
- Elijah Boardman, United States Senator from Connecticut and founder of Boardman Township
- Ricardo Condori, long-distance runner
- Dana DeLorenzo, actress, former radio personality and producer
- Terence Dials, former professional basketball player
- D. J. Durkin, American football head coach at Auburn
- John Greco, former professional American football guard
- Elizabeth Hartman, actress
- Mary Ellen Kay, television and film actress
- Bernie Kosar, former professional American football quarterback best known for roles with the Cleveland Browns and Miami Dolphins
- Corey Linsley, professional American football center for the Los Angeles Chargers
- Maureen McGovern, singer and Broadway actress
- Norm Purucker, collegiate American football player
- Amy Salerno, member of the Ohio House of Representatives from the 23rd district
- Joe Schiavoni, judge, former Minority Leader of the Ohio Senate
- Jason Spitz, former professional American football center
- Sue Thomas, first deaf FBI agent, author
- Steve Vallos, former professional American football center
- Jed York, owner of the San Francisco 49ers
