= Flaminia Jandolo =

Italian actress and voice actress (1930–2019)

- Born: 11 February 1930; Rome, Kingdom of Italy
- Died: 22 May 2019 (aged 89); Rome, Italy
- Occupations: Actress; voice actress; dubbing director
- Years active: 1950–2019
- Spouse: Alberto Piferi
- Children: 3

Flaminia Jandolo (11 February 1930 – 22 May 2019) was an Italian actress and voice actress.

== Biography ==
The daughter of the writer Rina De Felici, Jandolo began her career in the early 1950s in Rai's radio prose, before addressing to voice acting and dubbing. Among the several actresses she dubbed, there are Brigitte Bardot, Jean Simmons, Joan Plowright, Joanne Woodward, Maggie Smith and Debbie Reynolds.

Jandolo was also very active in dubbing many animated characters, including Lady in Lady and the Tramp, the fairy Merryweather in Sleeping Beauty, Perdita in One Hundred and One Dalmatians and Mrs. Brisby in The Secret of NIMH.

=== Personal life ===
Jandolo was married to dialogue adapter Alberto Piferi, from whom she divorced and from whom she had her children Leonardo and Susanna, who were also dialogue adapters, and Caterina, who is a dubbing assistant.

== Dubbing roles ==
=== Animation ===
- Lady in Lady and the Tramp
- Fairy Merryweather in Sleeping Beauty
- Perdita in One Hundred and One Dalmatians
- Cindy Bear in Hey There, It's Yogi Bear!
- Anastasia Tremaine in Cinderella (1967 redub)
- Mrs. Rabbit in Bambi (1968 redub)
- Mrs. Brisby in The Secret of NIMH
- Granny in Bugs Bunny's 3rd Movie: 1001 Rabbit Tales
- Filo Fester in Alakazam the Great

=== Live action ===
- Lucie in The Grand Maneuver
- Agnès Dumont in Plucking the Daisy
- Juliette Hardy in And God Created Woman
- Ursula in The Night Heaven Fell
- Éva Marchand in The Female
- Babette in Babette Goes to War
- Sophie in Please, Not Now!
- Marie Fitzgerald O'Malley in Viva Maria!
- Giuseppina in Spirits of the Dead
- Miriam Polar in Valley of the Dolls
- Fritzie Braddock in Buona Sera, Mrs. Campbell
- Minnie Littlejohn in The Long, Hot Summer
- Claudia Procula in The Greatest Story Ever Told
- Miss Humphries in The Third Secret
- Sally Young in A Study in Terror
- Ellen Brody in Jaws
- Ellen Brody in Jaws 2
- Joyce in The Night Walker
- Kathy Selden in Singin' in the Rain
- Em Reed in How to Make an American Quilt
- Dorothy Kingship in A Kiss Before Dying
- Mary-Lou in The Man Who Fell to Earth
- Miss Bowers in Death on the Nile
- Jean Rice in The Entertainer
- Gwendolyn Pigeon in The Odd Couple
- Henrietta Lowell in A New Leaf
- Patricia Hingle in Suspiria
- Lil Mainwaring in Marnie
- Josefa in Sugar Colt
- Stella Baines in Back to the Future
- Jolanda in Stato interessante
- Di Giovanni Marisa in Torture Me But Kill Me with Kisses
- Prostitute in The Bloodstained Lawn
- Lisa in Grand Prix
