= Forest Lawn Memorial Park (Ohio) =

Cemetery in Mahoning, Ohio, US

- U.S. National Register of Historic Places
- Forest Lawn entrance gate

- Location within Ohio Location within the United States
- Location: 5400 Market Street, Boardman, Ohio
- Coordinates: 41°2′34″N 80°40′01″W
- NRHP reference No.: 100003244
- Added to NRHP: December 18, 2018

Forest Lawn Memorial Park is a nonsectarian cemetery located in Boardman Township, Mahoning County, Ohio, United States. It was built in the 1930s and added to the National Register in 2018.

Notable burials at Forest Lawn include MLB infielder Floyd Baker (1916–2004) and actress Elizabeth Hartman (1943–1987).

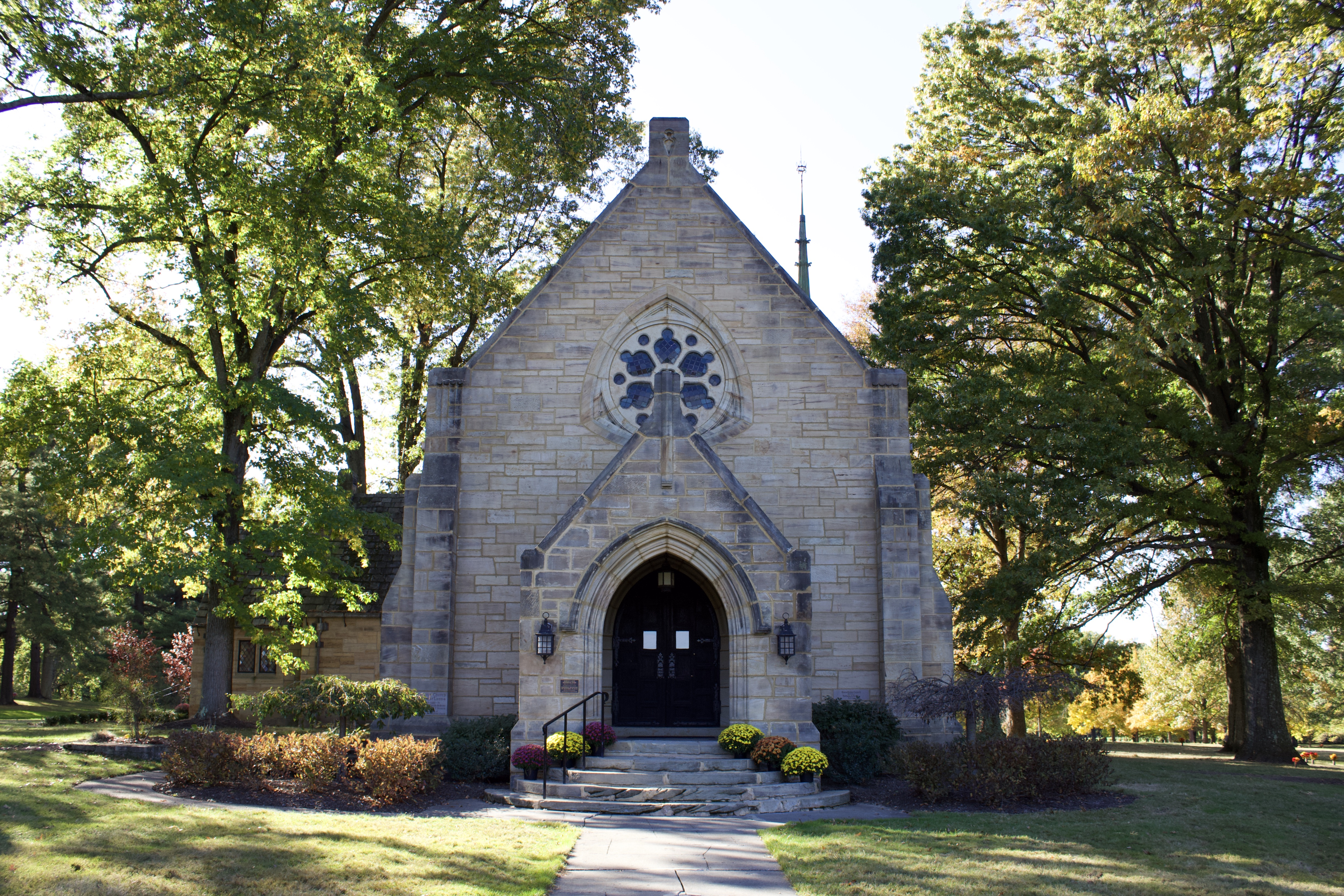
The Chapel at Forest Lawn Memorial Park.
