= St. James Episcopal Church (Boardman, Ohio) =

Historic church in Ohio, United States

- St. James Episcopal Meeting House
- U.S. National Register of Historic Places
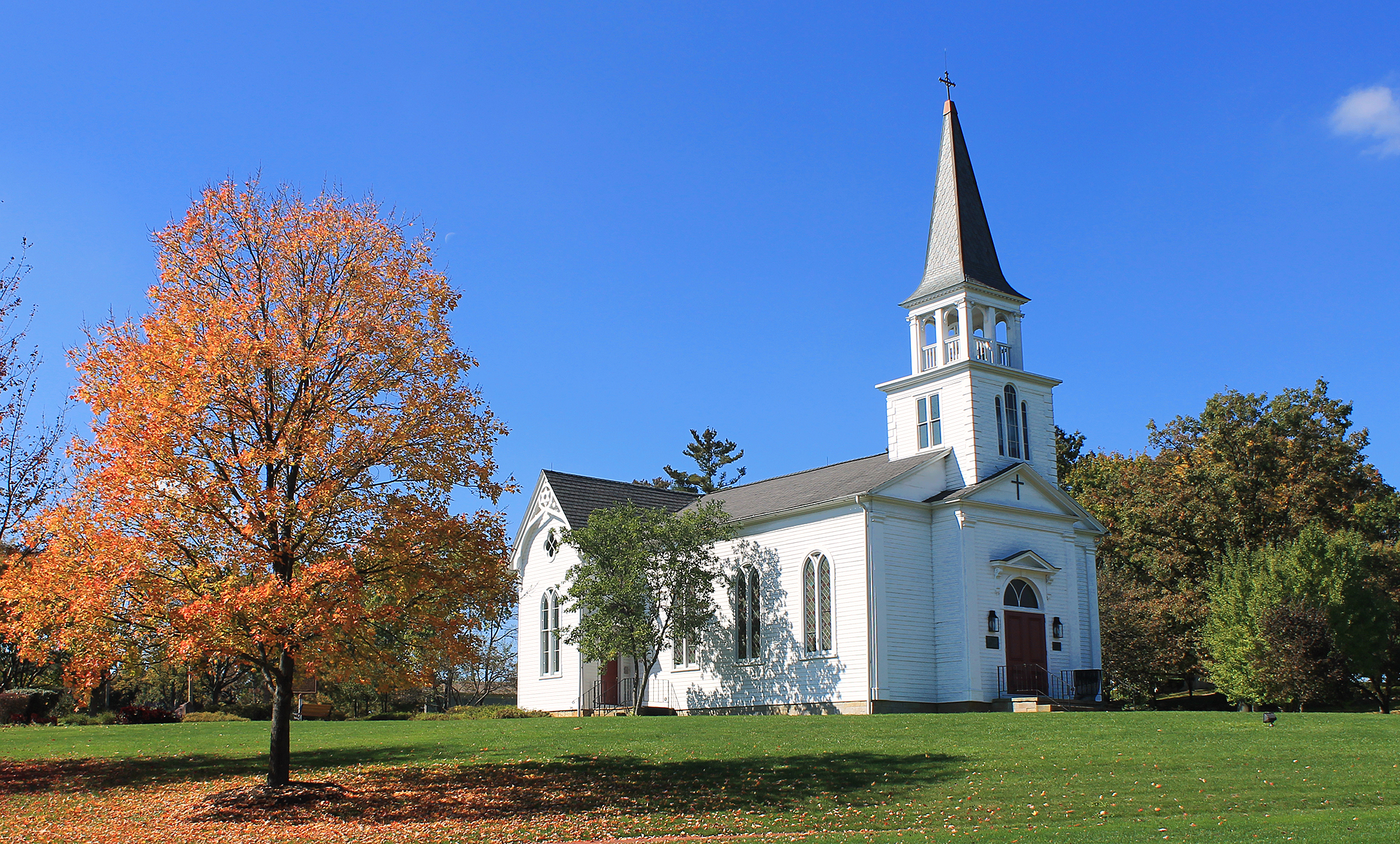
- Pictured in 2012

- Location within Ohio Location within the United States
- Location: 375 Boardman-Poland Rd., Boardman, Ohio, U.S.
- Coordinates: 41°1′25″N 80°39′0″W
- Area: 1 acre (0.40 ha)
- Built: 1828
- Architect: Boardman, Elijah
- NRHP reference No.: 79001892
- Added to NRHP: June 20, 1979

St. James Meeting House is a historic church building at 375 Boardman-Poland Road in Boardman, Ohio, United States. It was built as St. James Episcopal Church in 1828, deconsecrated in 1971, relocated to Boardman Park in 1972, and added to the National Register of Historic Places in 1979.

The church reported 100 members in 2015 and 83 members in 2023; no membership statistics were reported nationally in 2024 parochial reports. Plate and pledge income reported for the congregation in 2024 was $71,793. Average Sunday attendance (ASA) in 2024 was 32 persons.

The congregation was established in about 1809 and was the first Episcopal church created outside the Thirteen Colonies. It moved to a new church on Glenwood Avenue in Boardman, after which this structure was deconsecrated and relocated. The congregation held its final service in 2026 after membership dwindled.
