= Terence Dials =

American basketball player (born 1983)

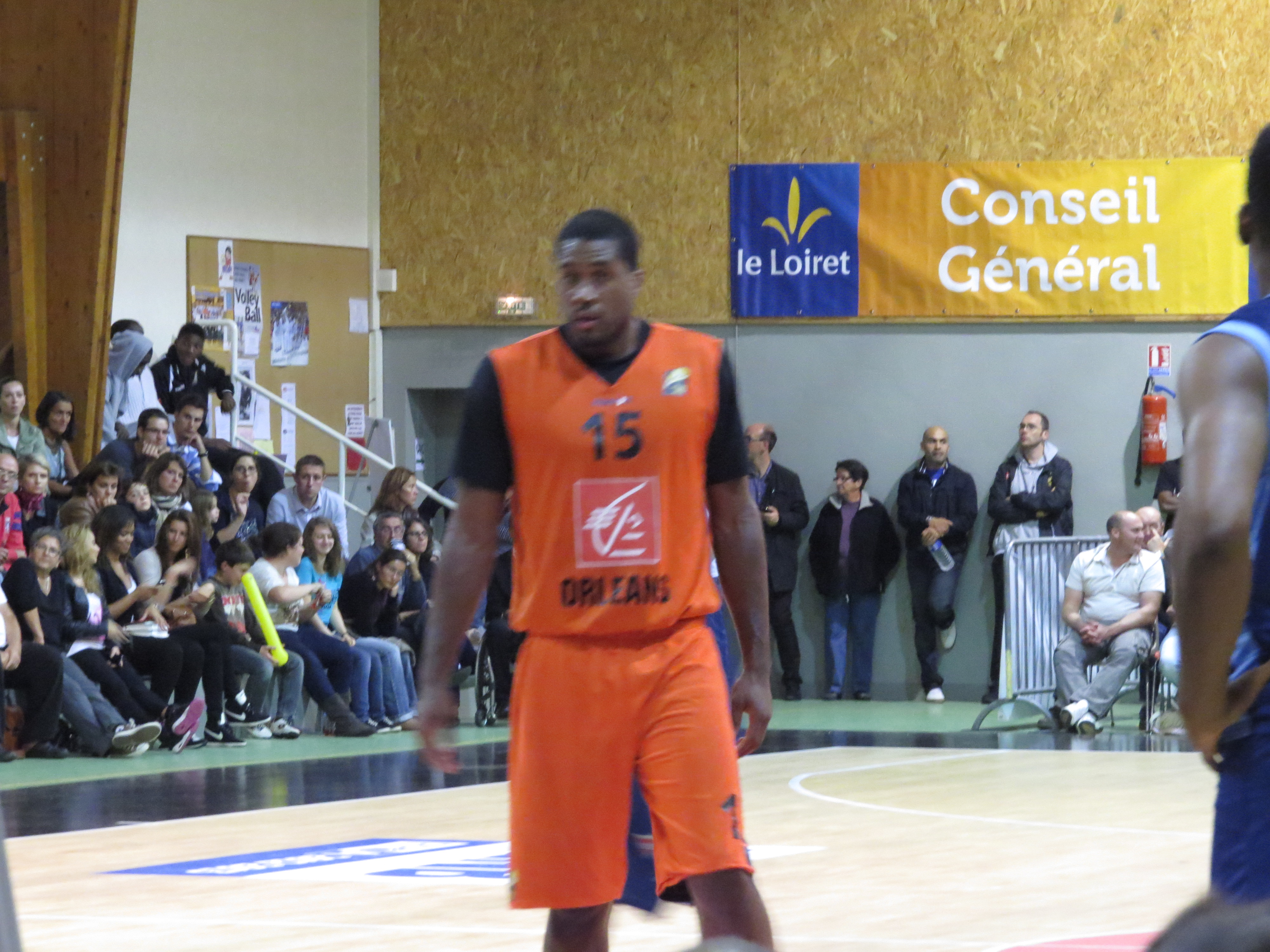
- Orléans Loiret Basket - Chorale de Roanne, 13 Septembre 2013 - 25

Personal information
- Born: July 15, 1983 (age 42) Detroit, Michigan, U.S.
- Listed height: 6 ft 9 in (2.06 m)
- Listed weight: 248.6 lb (113 kg)

Career information
- High school: Boardman (Boardman, Ohio)
- College: Ohio State (2001–2006)
- NBA draft: 2006: undrafted
- Playing career: 2006–2015
- Position: Power forward

Career history
- 2006–2007: Orléans Loiret Basket
- 2007–2008: Élan Béarnais Pau-Orthez
- 2008–2009: Orléans Loiret Basket
- 2009–2010: Paderborn Baskets
- 2010: BBC Nyon
- 2010: Western Liaoning
- 2010–2011: Apollon Limassol
- 2011: Hebei Springs
- 2011–2012: Pure-Youth Construction
- 2012–2013: Hyères-Toulon
- 2013–2014: Orléans Loiret Basket
- 2014–2015: BBC Monthey
- 2015: Club Malvín

Career highlights
- Big Ten Player of the Year (2006); First-team All-Big Ten (2006)

Terence Jerome Dials, Jr. (born July 15, 1983) is an American former professional basketball player. He played collegiately with the Ohio State Buckeyes. He has been playing professionally since 2006 for various teams outside of his country of the United States.

Dials was born in Detroit, Michigan but grew up in Boardman, Ohio and attended Boardman High School there. A power forward, he once broke a basketball backboard during a team practice in high school. He was offered an athletic scholarship to play for Ohio State University. During his four-year career with the Buckeyes, Dials scored 1,566 points and grabbed 876 rebounds in 132 total games played. He was named the Big Ten Conference Men's Basketball Player of the Year as a senior in 2005–06. Dials went undrafted in the 2006 NBA draft.

For the 2012–13 season he signed with Hyères-Toulon of the LNB Pro B. In April 2013, he signed with his former team Orléans Loiret Basket. In November 2014, he signed with BBC Monthey of Switzerland.
