= Youngstown Playhouse =

Coordinates: 41.079476°N 80.673648°W

The Youngstown Playhouse, is a community theater located in the former industrial center of Youngstown, Ohio.

== Early years ==
The Youngstown Playhouse traces its origins to February 16, 1924, when several local drama organizations formed a single organization called the Youngstown Players. With the support of local civic leaders, the group eventually secured its own building. The Youngstown Playhouse was initially housed in a renovated 19th-century barn. In 1940, supporters of the Playhouse raised $30,000 to build a new facility. Instead, the money was used to renovate a vacant movie house for live theater. Two years later, the Playhouse christened its new location with a production of "Camille of Roaring Camp".

== Transformation ==
During World War II, the Youngstown Playhouse raised its artistic standards considerably. Under the artistic direction of Broadway director Arthur Sircom, the Playhouse became known as a training ground for professional actors. Local theatrical figures who gained experience at the Youngstown Playhouse included the late dramatic screen actress Elizabeth Hartman. In 1959, the Playhouse moved to a new two-theater building on Glenwood Avenue.
