= Boardman High School =

Public high school located in Boardman, Ohio U.S.

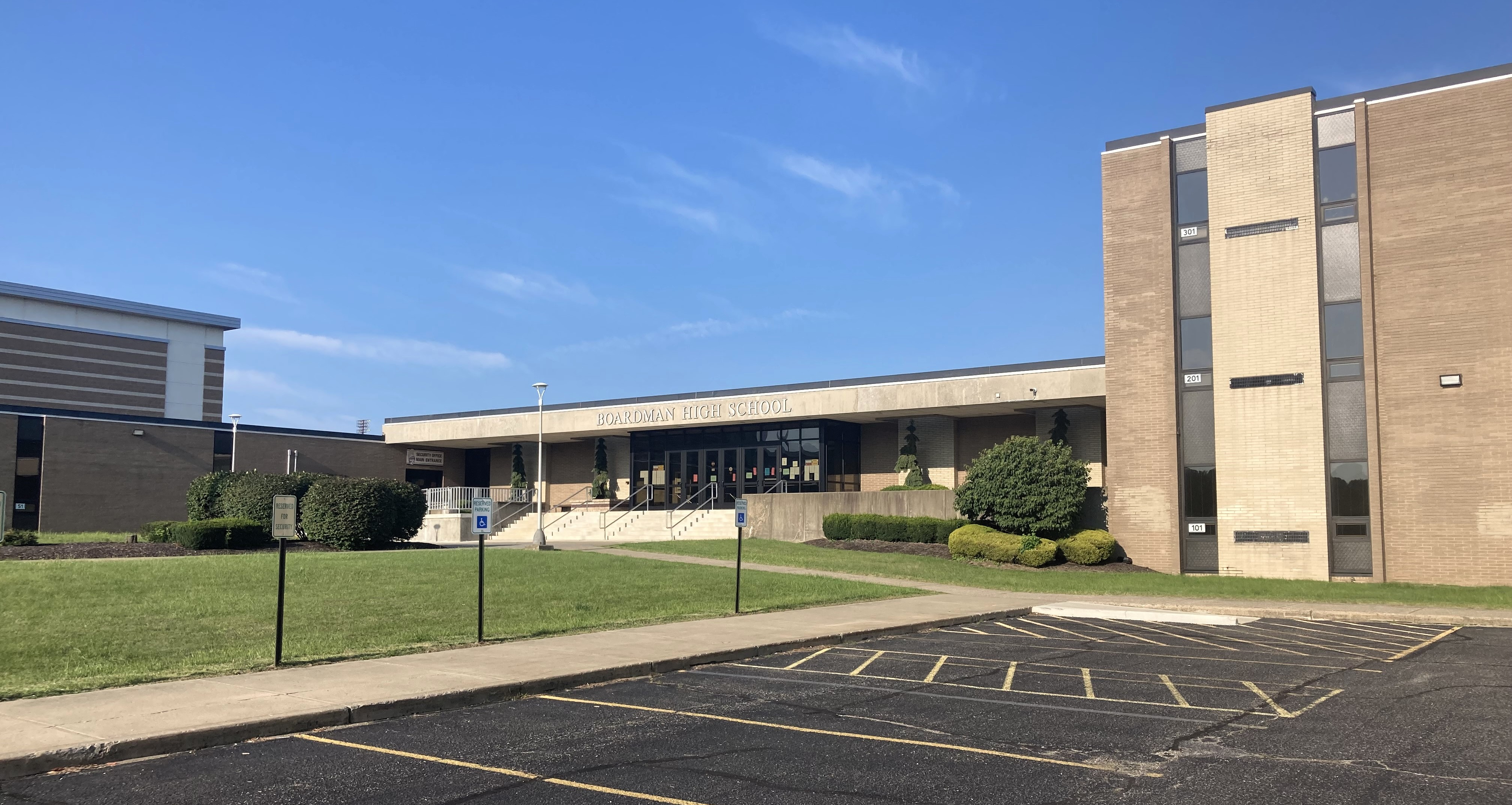

Location
- 7777 Glenwood Avenue; North-East Ohio; Boardman, Ohio 44512; United States; 41°0′39″N 80°40′7″W

Information
- Other name: BHS
- Type: Public
- Opened: 1904
- School district: Boardman Local School District
- Superintendent: Christopher Neifer
- Principal: Mark Zura Associates: Kyle Shehan and Anne Bott
- Teaching staff: 69.69 (FTE)
- Grades: 9–12
- Gender: Coeducational
- Enrollment: 1,005 (2024–2025)
- Student to teacher ratio: 14.42
- Colors: Maroon and white
- Athletics conference: All-American Conference
- Team name: Spartans
- Website: www.boardman.k12.oh.us/1/Home/

Boardman High School is a high school in Boardman Township, Ohio, United States. It is the only high school in the Boardman Local School District. Athletic teams are known as the Spartans, and they compete as a member of the Ohio High School Athletic Association in the All-American Conference.

== History ==
In 1904, Boardman Township residents approved the creation of a centralized high school. The first high school building was constructed at the cost of $4,469, located at 7330 Market Street.

Following World War II, Boardman experienced significant suburban growth as families moved out of nearby industrial centers. This population boom placed increasing strain on the original high school facility. By the 1960s, the need for a larger, modern campus led to the construction of a new high school building on Glenwood Avenue. The current Boardman High School opened in 1969, replacing the original Market Street building.

When the current high school was built, voters had previously rejected a bond to build an auditorium. Another bond was proposed in 1994, with that too being rejected by voters. Larry Saxton, Boardman's then superintendent in 1996, formed a team to study the benefits of an auditorium. He then made a proposal to the Boardman BOE, that would allow for the auditorium to be built, without costing the community additional taxes. In 1997, an action committee was formed, raising $1.5 million from private donations to build their performing arts center. Construction began in 1999 and was completed in August 2000.

== Extracurricular activities ==
Boardman High School hosts a wide range of extracurricular activities including, but not limited to: Marching Band, Quiz Bowl, Drama Guild, Italian Club, Spanish Club, National Honor Society, Speech & Debate, Student Council, Photo Arts Club, and Medical Career Club, History Club, Social Studies Club, Key Club, Emerging Leaders, Science Club, English Festival, and Chess Club.

=== Music ===
In 2006, the music department was selected a "Grammy Signature School" and received a $1,000 award. The music department was one of 16 schools selected for this honor. The department consists of award-winning choral, band, and orchestra departments.

==== The Boardman Spartan Marching and Concert Band ====
Boardman offers Marching Band, beginning in 1926, originally under the direction of James Minteer, Over the years, Boardman has been invited to several events including the Rose Bowl, numerous professional football games, and the Indy 500.

Boardman also offers concert band during the second half of the school year. In concert, the band splits into two: wind ensemble and symphonic band, with wind ensemble performing at a higher level.

=== Quiz Bowl ===
Boardman offers Quiz Bowl, in which the program has won several league championships, and National Championships. During the 2017–18 season, Boardman was ranked in the top 5 in Ohio and the top 100 in the nation. Boardman finished tied for 32nd place in the 2018 high school national tournament.

=== Productions ===
Boardman offers a multimedia program, which began in 1992 called BSTN Productions. The studio was moved to the Performing Arts Center in 2000 after being a part of Center Middle School beforehand. Boardman's multimedia program has become an award-winning program, placing first in a video competition in 2018. They have also branched to their new Spartan Stadium in 2015, running the Jumbo Tron and livestreams on platforms such as YouTube. The program currently offers 4 different courses: Broadcast Journalism, Digital Video Productions, Advanced Digital Video Productions, and Film Studies.

== Athletics ==
Boardman High School offers:

- Baseball
- Basketball
- Bowling
- Cheerleading
- Cross country
- Golf
- Football
- Lacrosse
- Soccer
- Softball
- Swimming
- Tennis
- Track and field
- Volleyball
- Wrestling

=== State championships ===
- Girls' softball – 2001
- Girls' bowling – 2010, 2024

== Notable alumni ==
- Dana DeLorenzo - Actress and radio personality
- Terence Dials – former college football player
- Dave Dravecky – former professional baseball player in the Major League Baseball (MLB)
- D. J. Durkin – college football coach
- John Greco – former professional football player in the National Football League (NFL)
- Elizabeth Hartman – former actress
- Bernie Kosar – former professional football player in the National Football League (NFL)
- Anthony LaMarca – musician in The War on Drugs (band)
- Nanette Lepore – fashion designer
- Corey Linsley – former professional football player in the National Football League (NFL)
- Maureen McGovern – singer and actress
- Mike Rice Jr. – former college basketball coach
- Joe Schiavoni – politician
- Steve Vallos – former professional football player in the National Football League (NFL)
