= Steve Vallos =

American football player (born 1983)

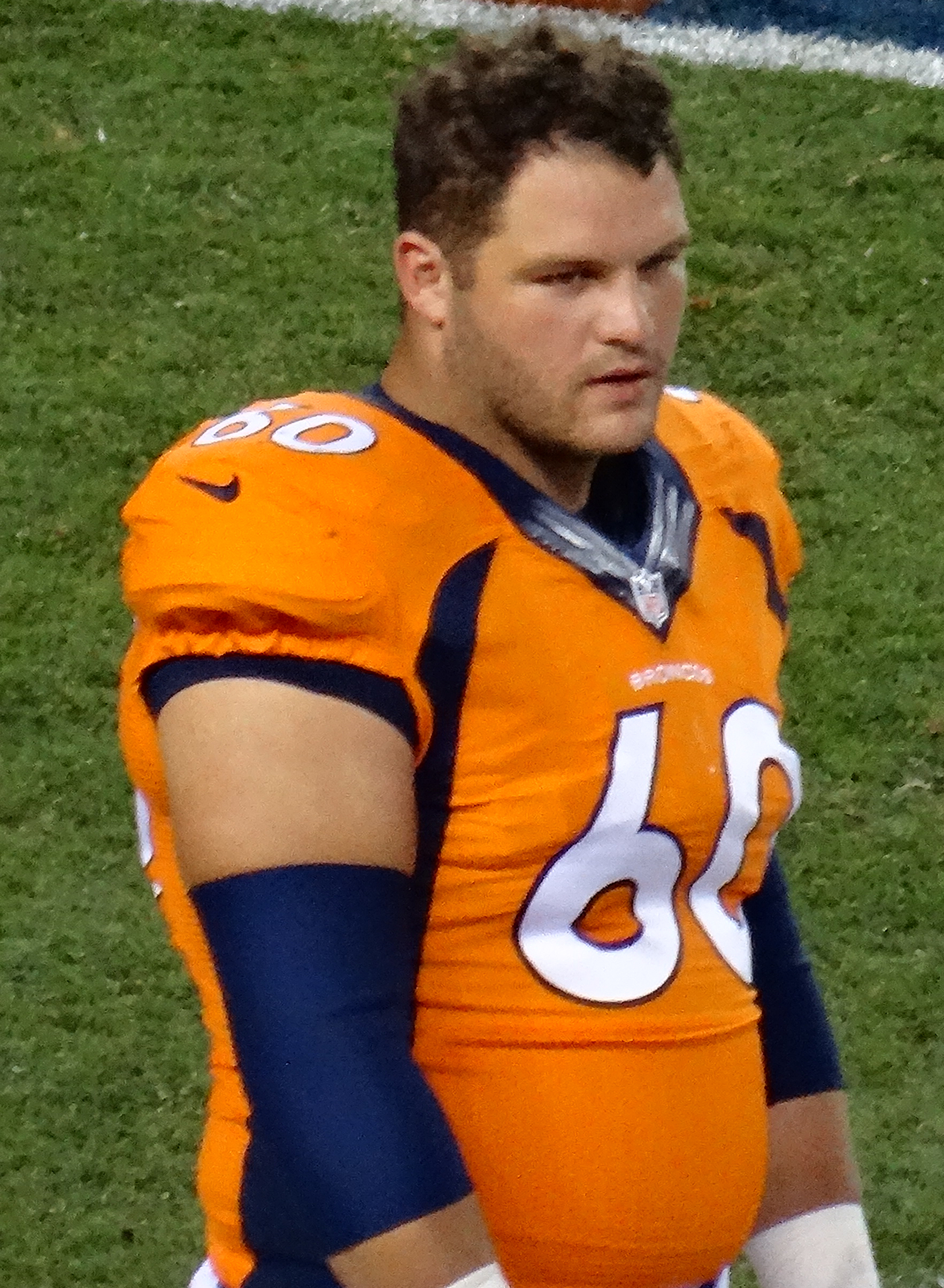
- Vallos with the Denver Broncos in 2013

No. 60, 66, 68, 69
- Position: Center

Personal information
- Born: December 28, 1983 (age 42); Youngstown, Ohio, U.S.
- Listed height: 6 ft 3 in (1.91 m)
- Listed weight: 297 lb (135 kg)

Career information
- High school: Boardman (Boardman, Ohio)
- College: Wake Forest
- NFL draft: 2007: 7th round, 232nd overall pick

Career history
- Seattle Seahawks (2007−2009); Cleveland Browns (2010−2011); Philadelphia Eagles (2012); Jacksonville Jaguars (2012); Denver Broncos (2013); Tennessee Titans (2014)*
- * Offseason or practice squad member only

Awards and highlights
- First-team All-American (2006); First-team All-ACC (2006); Second-team All-ACC (2004)

Career NFL statistics
- Games played: 59
- Games started: 9
- Stats at Pro Football Reference

Steve Vallos (born December 28, 1983) is an American former professional football player who was a center in the National Football League (NFL). He played college football for the Wake Forest Demon Deacons, earning first-team All-American honors in 2006. He was selected by the Seattle Seahawks in the seventh round of the 2007 NFL draft.

Vallos has also played for the Cleveland Browns, Philadelphia Eagles, Jacksonville Jaguars, and Denver Broncos.

== Early life ==
Vallos attended Boardman High School in Boardman, Ohio, where he played football. He was selected to participate in the Big 33 Football Classic in July 2002. He lettered all four years in track and field, and placed first in discus for Mahoning County as a senior. Vallos earned The Vindicator track all-star honors for all four years of high school.

== College career ==
Vallos played college football for Wake Forest University. After redshirting the 2002 season, he started in every game in 2003 at offensive guard. He graded out at 86.1 for the season, and he earned The Sporting News third-team Freshman All-America honors.

As a fifth-year senior, Vallos helped lead the Demon Deacons to the 2006 ACC Championship, where they defeated Georgia Tech by a score of 9–6. He graded out at 90 percent for the season, the best final score of his career. Vallos left Wake Forest as the school's all-time leader in career starts (48).

=== Awards and honors ===
- Sporting News Freshman All-ACC (2003)
- Third-team Sporting News Freshman All-American (2003)
- First-team Rivals.com All-ACC (2004)
- Honorable mention All-ACC (2005)
- First-team College Football News All-ACC (2006)
- First-team Atlantic Coast Sports Media Association All-ACC (2006)
- Second-team WFCC All-American (2006)
- First-team Sports Illustrated All-American (2006)
- First-team Sporting News All-American (2006)
- College Football News ACC Player of the Year 2006)

== Professional career ==
=== Seattle Seahawks ===
Vallos was selected by the Seattle Seahawks in the seventh round (232nd overall) of the 2007 NFL draft. He was released during final roster cuts on September 1, 2007. He spent the 2007 season on the team's practice squad. After Chris Spencer suffered a season-ending injury in December 2008, Vallos started at center in his place. He played in 16 games in 2008 with five starts. Vallos played in all 16 games in 2009 with three starts, but was waived during final roster cuts on September 5, 2010.

=== Cleveland Browns ===
Vallos was claimed off waivers by the Cleveland Browns on September 7, 2010. He played in seven games in 2010 and one game in 2011.

=== Philadelphia Eagles ===
After his contract with the Browns expired following the 2011 season, Vallos signed a one-year contract with the Philadelphia Eagles on March 19, 2012.

He was released on August 31.

He was re-signed by the Philadelphia Eagles on September 18, 2012, to fill the spot vacated by center Jason Kelce, who was placed on season-ending injured reserve due to a knee injury.

=== Jacksonville Jaguars ===
Vallos was signed by the Jacksonville Jaguars on October 30, 2012, released on November 3, and signed again on November 5.

=== Denver Broncos ===
On July 28, 2013, Vallos was signed by the Denver Broncos to help replace Dan Koppen, who tore his ACL during practice earlier the same day.

=== Tennessee Titans ===
Vallos signed with the Tennessee Titans as a free agent on August 13, 2014 to add depth at center. The Titans waived him on August 31, prior to the start of the regular season.
