= Willow B: Women in Prison =

- Genre: Drama
- Teleplay by: Gerry Day
- Directed by: Jeff Bleckner
- Starring: Elizabeth Hartman; Ruth Roman; Virginia Capers; Carol Lynley; Sally Kirkland; Debra Clinger; Trisha Noble
- Country of origin: United States
- Original language: English

Production
- Producer: Michael Filerman
- Production company: Lorimar

Original release
- Network: ABC
- Release: June 29, 1980

Related
- Prison; Wentworth

Willow B: Women in Prison (also known as A Matter of Survival) is a 1980 television pilot starring Elizabeth Hartman, Debra Clinger, Trisha Noble, Sally Kirkland and Ruth Roman as Sergeant Pritchard, a sadistic prison guard. The pilot was produced by Michael Filerman.

== Plot ==
A formerly rich socialite is convicted of driving under the influence and vehicular manslaughter and now spends her life in a frightening section of the El Camino Women's Detention Center.

== Spinoff ==
Willow B: Women in Prison was a spinoff for an unproduced American version of Prisoner, an Australian television series.

== Critical reception ==
The Washington Post wrote "Whoooo -- hot stuff! ABC, which has always had sleaze at the bottom of its heart, unloads an unsold serial pilot Sunday night called "Willow B: Women in Prison" that makes "Dallas" look like "Little House on the Prairie.""
