= The Secret of NIMH =

1982 animated film by Don Bluth

- Theatrical release poster by Tim Hildebrandt
- Directed by: Don Bluth
- Story by: Don Bluth; John Pomeroy; Gary Goldman; Will Finn
- Based on: Mrs. Frisby and the Rats of NIMH by Robert C. O'Brien
- Produced by: Don Bluth; Gary Goldman; John Pomeroy
- Starring: Hermione Baddeley; John Carradine; Dom DeLuise; Elizabeth Hartman; Derek Jacobi; Arthur Malet; Paul Shenar; Peter Strauss
- Edited by: Jeffrey Patch
- Music by: Jerry Goldsmith
- Production companies: Aurora; Don Bluth Productions
- Distributed by: United Artists (through MGM/UA Entertainment Co.) (Note: MGM/UA directly distributed the film using the United Artists label.)
- Release date: July 2, 1982
- Running time: 83 minutes
- Country: United States
- Language: English
- Budget: $6.3-7 million
- Box office: $14.7 million

The Secret of NIMH is a 1982 American independent animated fantasy adventure film directed by Don Bluth in his feature directorial debut and based on Robert C. O'Brien's children's novel Mrs. Frisby and the Rats of NIMH. Featuring an ensemble cast consisting of Elizabeth Hartman in her final film role as its protagonist, Mrs. Brisby, with Peter Strauss, Arthur Malet, Dom DeLuise, John Carradine, Derek Jacobi, Paul Shenar and Hermione Baddeley in supporting roles, the film was produced by Bluth's production company, Don Bluth Productions, in association with Aurora Productions.

The Secret of NIMH was released in the United States on July 2, 1982, by MGM/UA Entertainment Co. under the United Artists label. It was met with critical acclaim and won a Saturn Award for Best Animated Film of 1982. Though the film only made $14.7 million against a $7 million budget at the box office, it turned a solid profit through home video and overseas releases. It was followed in 1998 by a direct-to-video sequel, The Secret of NIMH 2: Timmy to the Rescue, which was made without Bluth's involvement.

In 2015, a live-action/animated remake was reported to be in the works. A television series adaptation was also revealed to be in development since 2021.

== Plot ==
Mrs. Brisby, (Note: Changed from "Mrs. Frisby" in the original novel, as explained in "Writing" section.) a widowed field mouse, lives in a cinder block with her children on a farm owned by the Fitzgibbons family. She intends to move her family out of the field as plowing time approaches, but her son Timothy has fallen ill, making it impossible for him to travel.

Brisby visits Mr. Ages, a friend of her late husband Jonathan, who diagnoses the illness as pneumonia, provides her with medicine, and warns that Timothy must stay inside for at least three weeks to recover. On her way home, Brisby befriends Jeremy, a clumsy but amiable crow, shortly before they narrowly escape the Fitzgibbons' cat, Dragon. The next morning, she discovers that the plowing has begun early. Although her neighbor, Auntie Shrew, helps disable the tractor used for the task, Brisby realizes she needs a better plan. Jeremy then takes her to meet the Great Owl, who at first rejects her, but upon learning she is Jonathan Brisby's widow, tells her to visit a colony of rats living beneath a rose bush on the farm and seek out Nicodemus, their wise and mystical leader.

Brisby enters the rose bush and encounters an aggressive guard rat named Brutus, who chases her away. She is led back in by Ages and is amazed to see the rats' use of electricity and other technology. Brisby meets Justin, the friendly captain of the guard; Jenner, a ruthless and power-hungry member opposed to Nicodemus; and finally Nicodemus himself. From Nicodemus, she learns that many years ago the rats, along with her husband and Ages, were part of a series of experiments at the National Institute of Mental Health (NIMH for short). The experiments gave them human-like intelligence, enabling them to escape, as well as extending their lifespans. They are unable to live as typical rats would, however, and need human technology to survive, which they can get only by stealing, placing them at great risk of discovery. To avoid being at the mercy of humankind again, the rats have collectively decided to leave the farm and live independently in an area they refer to as Thorn Valley. Nicodemus then gives Brisby a magical amulet that will activate when the wearer is courageous. Meanwhile, Jenner, who wishes for the rats to remain in the rose bush, plots to eliminate Nicodemus.

Out of respect for Jonathan, the rats agree to help her move her home. First, they need to drug Dragon so it can be done without interference. Only Brisby can do this, as the rats cannot fit through the hole leading into the house; Jonathan was killed by Dragon in a previous attempt, while Ages broke his leg in another. That night, she puts the drug into Dragon's dish, but the Fitzgibbons' son catches her. While trapped in a birdcage, she overhears a telephone conversation between the Fitzgibbonses' patriarch and the staff of NIMH and learns that the institute intends to exterminate the rats in the morning. Brisby then escapes from the cage and runs off to warn them.

As a thunderstorm approaches, the rats begin moving the Brisby home, with the children and Auntie Shrew inside, using a rope and pulley system. Jenner sabotages the assembly, causing it to fall apart and crush Nicodemus to death. Brisby soon arrives to warn the rats about NIMH's arrival, but Jenner attacks her and attempts to steal the amulet as his reluctant accomplice, Sullivan, alerts Justin, who comes to Brisby's aid. Jenner mortally wounds Sullivan and engages Justin in a sword fight, but is killed by a knife in the back from the dying Sullivan.

The Brisby home begins to sink into the muddy ground and Brisby and the rats are unable to raise it. All appears lost until Brisby's will to save her family suddenly gives power to the amulet, which she uses to lift the house and move it to safety. The next day, the rats, with Justin as their new leader, have departed for Thorn Valley as Timothy begins to recover, while Jeremy meets and falls in love with an equally clumsy female crow.

== Voice cast ==
- Elizabeth Hartman as Mrs. Brisby
- Peter Strauss as Justin
- Derek Jacobi as Nicodemus
- Arthur Malet as Mr. Ages
- Dom DeLuise as Jeremy
- Paul Shenar as Jenner
- John Carradine as The Great Owl
- Shannen Doherty as Teresa Brisby
- Wil Wheaton as Martin Brisby
- Jodi Hicks as Cynthia Brisby
- Hermione Baddeley as Auntie Shrew
- Aldo Ray as Sullivan
- Tom Hatten as Farmer Fitzgibbons
- Lucille Bliss as Mrs. Fitzgibbons
- Joshua Lawrence as Billy Fitzgibbons
- Ina Fried (Note: Credited as "Ian Fried"; The Secret of NIMH was released before Fried came out as transgender.) as Timothy Brisby
- Charles Champlin, Dick Kleiner and Norbert Auerbach as members of the Rats of NIMH's council
- Edie McClurg as Miss Right

== Production ==
=== Background ===
The film rights to the book Mrs. Frisby and the Rats of NIMH had reportedly been offered to Walt Disney Productions in 1972, but they were turned down.

The Secret of NIMH was the first feature film to be directed by Don Bluth. On September 13, 1979, Bluth, fellow animators Gary Goldman and John Pomeroy and eight other animation staff left the feature animation department at Disney to set up their own independent studio, Don Bluth Productions. The studio worked, at first, out of Bluth's house and garage, but moved to a two-story, 5,500-square-foot (510 m^{2}) facility in Studio City, California, several months later.

While they were still working at Disney, they produced the 27-minute short film Banjo the Woodpile Cat (1979) as a side project to gain other production skills that the company and their animation program were not addressing. Bluth asked Ron W. Miller, Walt Disney's son-in-law and the president and CEO of the company at the time, to view Banjo, but Miller declined. As Goldman recalled, "that pulled the enthusiasm rug out from under us. We had hoped that the studio might like what we were doing and agree to buy the film and allow us to finish the short film in the studio, which would allow us to recoup what we had spent in terms of money and the many hours that we and the other members of the team had invested in the film".

Before they started making Banjo, Mrs. Frisby and the Rats of NIMH was read by artist and story writer Ken Anderson, who called it "a wonderful story". He gave the book to Bluth for him to read and make a film out of after Bluth finished the animation direction of Pete's Dragon (1977). Bluth later showed the novel to Disney animation director Wolfgang Reitherman, who turned down Bluth's offers to make a film based on the book, explaining that Disney has already a mouse named Mickey Mouse and they had recently made a similar film about mice named The Rescuers (1977). However, Bluth also presented the novel to the other staff that would work for Don Bluth Productions later on and they all loved it. Two months later, former Disney executive James L. Stewart, who now had started Aurora Productions, called Goldman and told him about Anderson's idea of making a film based on NIMH. At Bluth, Goldman and Pomeroy's request, Aurora Productions acquired the film rights and offered Don Bluth Productions a budget of US$5.7 million and 30 months to complete the film, tighter in both budget and schedule than most Disney animated features at the time.

=== Writing ===
"The amulet was a device, or symbol, to represent the internal power of Mrs. Brisby. ... In many ways, it was an extension of Mrs. Brisby ... a visual extension of an internal (and harder to show in a film) power".

— Don Bluth, explaining the amulet's inclusion in the film

One of the earliest drafts of the film was written by Steven Barnes, who received a creative consultant credit in the final product and was closer to the original novel. The story would have focused more on the rats and their time at NIMH as it did in the book, which was reduced to a short flashback in later revisions to bring Mrs. Brisby and her plight into the forefront. It also included (from the book) a female rat named Isabella (described as "a young, cute, somewhat motor-mouthed rat with a crush on Justin"), who was ultimately left out, with much of her dialogue given to Nicodemus. A revised synopsis dated July 2, 1980, by an unattributed author would take the film closer to its completed form, which ended with the mysterious disappearance of the rats, leading the characters and audience to wonder if they ever really existed, or were just an elaborate illusion.

Bluth himself would later make several changes to the story, most notably with the addition of mystical elements not present in the original novel. He explained that "regarding magic, we really believe that animation calls for some magic, to give it a special 'fantastic' quality". This was most apparent in the magic amulet given to Mrs. Brisby, which was meant to be a visual representation of her character's internal power, something harder to show on film. The object was also meant to introduce a spiritual aspect to the plot, with the director remarking: "The stone or amulet is just a method of letting the audience know that Mrs. Brisby has found 'Courage of the Heart'. Magic? Maybe. Spiritual? Yes". In the same vein, Nicodemus was made into a wizard to "create more mystery" about himself and the rats' colony.

Among other changes, the antagonist Jenner was given much more prominence in the film, being only mentioned in the book as a traitor who leaves, to "add drama" to the narrative by giving it a more visible enemy. In the movie, Justin succeeds Nicodemus as the leader of the rats to give his character more of an arc and to allow him an opportunity to "grow and change". Unlike the original work, Justin does not rescue Mrs. Brisby from the cage at the Fitzgibbons' house; instead, she helps her children without the rats' assistance by using the amulet, once again giving focus to her personal story. As Bluth put it, "The Secret of NIMH is really a story about Mrs. Brisby and her need to save her children. If the rats save her children, then she hasn't grown in the film".

During the film's production, Aurora contacted Wham-O, the manufacturers of Frisbee flying discs, with concerns about possible trademark infringements if the "Mrs. Frisby" name in O'Brien's original book was used in the film. Wham-O rejected Aurora's request for waiver to use the same-sounding name to their "Frisbee", in the film. Aurora informed Bluth & company that Mrs. Frisby's name would have to be altered. By then, the voice work had already been recorded for the film, so the name change to "Mrs. Brisby" necessitated a combination of re-recording some lines and, because John Carradine was unavailable for further recordings, careful sound editing had to be performed, taking the "B" sound of another word from Carradine's recorded lines, and replace the "F" sound with the "B" sound, altering the name from "Frisby" to "Brisby".

=== Casting ===
Goldman described the casting process as "exciting, fun, and sometimes strange". He stated that focusing on the characteristics of each character, the voices and acting abilities were crucial, saying that using voices that added to a film's texture was part of the team's philosophy in the development of a film. Goldman found the most memorable casting decision to be Dom DeLuise for the character of Jeremy, which Goldman, Bluth and Pomeroy all considered when they watched the 1978 film The End in their respective homes, independently of each other. Elizabeth Hartman was cast as Mrs. Brisby, with Goldman calling her performance in A Patch of Blue "so believable and sincere that we all felt that she was right for the part". Pomeroy suggested Derek Jacobi, who starred in the 1976 miniseries I, Claudius, to play the part of Nicodemus. Peter Strauss, whom the team previously saw in another miniseries from 1976, Rich Man, Poor Man, was cast as Justin. Paul Shenar was assigned to play Jenner since the staff liked his "dark, powerful voice". Shakespearean actor John Carradine was "perfect for the dark, ominous Great Owl", while Aldo Ray was assigned to voice Jenner's reluctant accomplice, Sullivan, whom Goldman said "also had a great distinctive voice".

=== Animation ===
Mrs. Brisby meeting Nicodemus. Backlighting techniques were used in this scene to give Nicodemus's eyes a bright glow. According to the commentary for the 2007 DVD release, Bluth wanted Nicodemus and the Great Owl to be seen as aspects of the same character, accounting for some similarities in their designs.

The production of The Secret of NIMH lasted from January 1980 to early June 1982. The studio set out with the explicit goal in mind of returning feature animation to its "golden era", concentrating on strong characters and story and experimenting with unusual and often more labor-intensive animation techniques. Bluth believed that older techniques were being abandoned in favor of lower production costs and that the only way that animation could survive was to continue traditional production methods.

Among the techniques experimented with on The Secret of NIMH were rotoscoping, multiple passes on the camera to achieve transparent shadows, backlit animation (where animated mattes are shot with light shining through color gels to produce glowing areas for artificial light and fire effects), and multiple color palettes for characters to fit in different lighting situations, from daylight, to night, to warm environments, to underwater. Mrs. Brisby had 46 different lighting situations; therefore there were 46 different color palettes, or lists of color, for her. Two modern, computerized versions of the multiplane camera were also manufactured for this production.

Objects like the bird cage that Mrs. Brisby escapes from, and the boats used by the rats, were made as physical models, painted and photographed, and eventually xeroxed onto animation cels which were then painted. Also Mrs. Brisby's home and several other locations were built as a physical model and photographed from different angles. These pictures were used as reference for the layout artists. Xerography was used to transfer the drawings to the cells, but the process used fourteen toners instead of just black. This allowed for better looking outlines.

To achieve the film's detailed full animation while keeping to the tight budget, the studio strove to maximize its use of time and resources. The crew often worked long hours with no immediate financial reward (though they were offered a cut of the film's profits, a practice common for producers, directors and stars of live action films, but never before offered to artists on an animated feature). Producer Gary Goldman recalled working 110-hour weeks during the final six months of production. Around 100 in-house staff worked on the film, with the labor-intensive cel painting farmed out to 45 people working from home. Many minor roles, including incidental and crowd voice work, were filled in by the in-house staff. The final cost of the film was $6.385 million. The producers, Bluth, Goldman and Pomeroy and the executive producers at Aurora mortgaged their homes collectively for $700,000 to complete the film, with the understanding that their investment would be the first to be repaid. The film was the sixth animated feature to be presented in the Dolby Stereo sound system.

In animating Justin and Jenner's sword fight, the animators referenced similar sequences in films such as The Adventures of Robin Hood (1938) and The Vikings (1958).

== Music ==
The film score is composed by Jerry Goldsmith, in his first composition for an animated feature film, and performed by the National Philharmonic Orchestra; one song, "Flying Dreams" was vocally performed by Paul Williams and Sally Stevens. The album was released on July 2, 1982, on vinyl and re-issued on March 3, 1995, on CD with a rearranged track listing. Intrada Records issued a remastered limited edition album on CD on August 17, 2015, with few unreleased cues and demos. On July 22, 2025, Intrada Records re-issued a remastered limited edition album on CD with even more unreleased cues.

== Release ==
Tim Hildebrandt spent two weeks painting The Secret of NIMH's promotional poster.

The film's distributor, MGM/UA Entertainment Co., barely showed any interest in the film, leading Aurora to raise another $4,200,000 from private funding to pay for both the prints and the advertising campaign. The financiers had expected the film to open in wide release in 1,000 venues, but MGM opted for a limited opening weekend in 100 theaters, with its widest release in only 700. Although it faced competition with the blockbuster E.T. the Extra-Terrestrial (directed by future Bluth partner Steven Spielberg), it performed better in those theaters alone in its opening week than Poltergeist, Rocky III, Firefox, and Star Trek II: The Wrath of Khan. NIMH grossed nearly $14.7 million in North America, though it was more successful on home video, cable, and foreign releases, ultimately turning a profit.

=== Home media ===
The Secret of NIMH debuted on Super 8 film and several home video formats in 1983, including VHS, Betamax, CED Videodisc, Video8 and LaserDisc, which were distributed by MGM/UA Home Video in North America and Warner Home Video in Europe, Australia and Japan. A Video 2000 version was also released exclusively in Europe. With a $79 purchase price in the United States, the VHS edition sold approximately 25,000 copies within the first few months.

On September 6, 1990, the film was re-released on both VHS and LaserDisc in a new advertising campaign with lower retail prices. It was this new wide availability on video, as well as broadcasts on cable, that helped NIMH garner a cult following long after its theatrical debut. This was followed by another VHS release under the MGM/UA Family Entertainment label in 1994, along with a Philips CD-i video disc version that same year, which was available exclusively through Warner Home Video worldwide.

The film was released on DVD for the first time on November 17, 1998, which was reprinted numerous times in the ensuing years, both as a stand-alone release or bundled with other animated films from MGM or 20th Century Fox. Don Bluth and Gary Goldman later oversaw a high-definition restoration of the film, which was released on June 19, 2007, in a 2-disc DVD set called the "Family Fun Edition". Improvements in the transfer over the 1998 DVD include color correction and dirt and dust removal and included special features such as audio commentary from both individuals and an interview featurette. A Blu-ray version was released on March 29, 2011, which retained the special features of the "Family Fun Edition". The film was released on Blu-ray again by Eureka Entertainment, a Region B issue under the label's Masters of Cinema line.

== Reception ==
=== Critical response ===
The Secret of NIMH received positive reviews upon its release. It holds an approval rating of 93% on Rotten Tomatoes based on 70 reviews, with an average rating of 7.6/10. The consensus states: "The Secret of NIMH seeks to resurrect the classical style of American animation and succeeds, telling a mature story with rapturous presentation." The film also has a weighted average score of 76 out of 100 on Metacritic based on 15 reviews, which indicates "generally favorable reviews".

Critics Gene Siskel and Roger Ebert gave the movie two "yes" votes on a July 15, 1982, episode of their television program Sneak Previews, stating that Don Bluth and his team had succeeded in their goal of matching the high-quality animation of Disney's heyday while also incorporating a deeper plot and greater variety of settings than other recent animated films. In his print review for the Chicago Sun-Times, Ebert gave the film three out of four stars, calling it "an artistic success", praising the quality of its animation and saying that it "contains that absolute rarity among feature-length animated cartoons, an interesting premise".

Ebert found that NIMH may not resonate as well on an emotional level with younger viewers, since "it has so many characters and involves them in so many different problems that there's nobody for the kids in the audience to strongly identify with". Siskel, writing for the Chicago Tribune, found the film "charming" but stated that the narrative was "littered with too many unimportant characters" and that Dom DeLuise "insert[ed] too much of himself" into the character of Jeremy. Despite this, Siskel found the film, particularly the second half, to be a "genuine pleasure" and felt that even adults will be drawn into the story by the end, giving it three stars out of four.

Vincent Canby of The New York Times noted the film's animation was "something of a technical and stylistic triumph" comparable to that of Disney's golden age, but he expressed dismay at the narrative, finding it too complicated and lacking in an "easily identifiable central character". In his review for the 1990 VHS re-release, Jeff Unger of Entertainment Weekly gave The Secret of NIMH an A grade, calling it "a wonderful adaptation" of the original book, adding that "Bluth and his animators, bless them, chose to revive an endangered art form – classically detailed animation. They drew their characters exquisitely and gave them individual personalities. The entire ensemble – artists, actors, animals, and musicians – created something unique: the world's first enjoyable rat race." Similarly, Richard Corliss of Time magazine called the film "something gorgeous to look at".

John Nubbin reviewed The Secret of NIMH for Different Worlds magazine and stated that "The Secret of NIMH is a delight to watch, and good news for all lovers of quality animation. Not only because it is a fine film, but also because it gives us hope for more of the same (or better) from this new, quality-pledging studio."

=== Accolades ===
The Secret of NIMH won Best Animated Film of 1982 at the 10th annual Saturn Awards, where it also received a nomination for Best Fantasy Film, losing to The Dark Crystal. In his acceptance speech, Bluth remarked: "Thanks. We didn't think anyone had noticed". The film was also nominated for Best Family Feature for Animation, Musical or Fantasy at the 4th annual Youth in Film Awards, being beaten by E.T. the Extra-Terrestrial, while the home video release received an Award of Excellence from the Film Advisory Board. In 2008, the American Film Institute nominated this film for its Top 10 Animation Films list.

Award	Nomination	Nominee	Result
Saturn Award	Best Animated Film	The Secret of NIMH	Won
Saturn Award	Best Fantasy Film	The Secret of NIMH	Nominated
Youth in Film Award	Best Family Feature: Animated, Musical or Fantasy	The Secret of NIMH	Nominated

== Sequel ==
A direct-to-video sequel directed by Dick Sebast and produced by Metro-Goldwyn-Mayer Animation titled The Secret of NIMH 2: Timmy to the Rescue was released on December 22, 1998. Set several years after the events of the first film, the plot focuses on Mrs. Brisby's son Timothy as he struggles to live up to his father's prestigious reputation. Apart from Dom DeLuise and Arthur Malet reprising their roles as Jeremy and Mr. Ages, respectively, none of the original voice cast returned for the film. The film was made without Don Bluth's input or involvement and was panned by critics and fans upon release.

== Live-action remake and television series ==
In 2009, Paramount Pictures was working with Neil Burger on a remake of The Secret of NIMH; nothing has materialized since.

In 2015, MGM re-acquired the rights to produce a new film based on the original novel Mrs. Frisby and the Rats of NIMH. The film was to be produced by the team of Daniel Bobker and Ehren Kruger, with screenplay by Ice Age series writer Michael Berg. The film was to be James Madigan's directorial debut. Planned as a CGI/live-action hybrid in the style of films like The Smurfs and Alvin and the Chipmunks, the film was to be "an origin story in which an imperiled mouse protagonist befriends a comical crew of lab rats as they turn hyper-intelligent. They escape a secret laboratory and become the great minds of vermin civilization, forced to outwit the humans hot on their tails". The studio planned to turn the novel into a family franchise.

The Russo brothers were attached as executive producers of the remake as of April 2019.

A television series based on the books was in development at Fox as an event series in September 2021.

== Bibliography ==
- Cawley, John (1991). "The Secret of NIMH". The Animated Films of Don Bluth. Image Pub of New York. pp. 37–56. ISBN 0-685-50334-8.
