= Newport Village Historic District =

Coordinates: 41°03′20″N 80°39′51″W

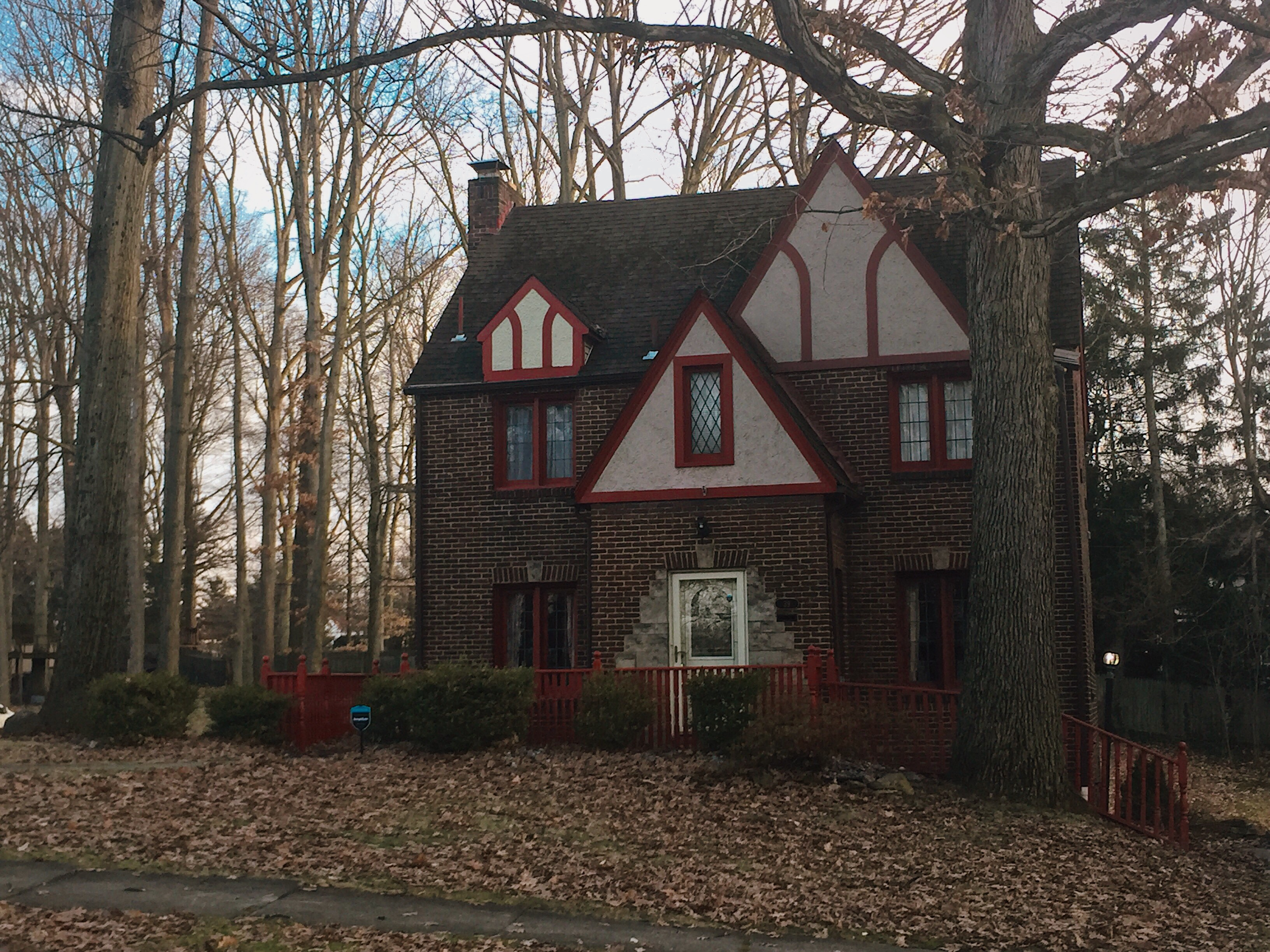
A Tudor Revival style home in Newport Village Historic District

Situated in the township of Boardman and developed in the 1920s, Newport Village was one of Youngstown’s earliest automobile accessible suburban developments. The twenty-four and a half acre district comprises Jennette Drive, Chester Drive, seven lots on Overhill Road, and a majority of the area on Market Street’s west side. Gently curving streets with both Tudor and Colonial architecture blend into the natural landscape of the area and Mill Creek Park. Newport Village became part of the National Register of Historic Places in 2006.

== History ==
Newport Village mainly attracted the city's upper-middle class who was looking to move to quieter and more suburban neighborhoods outside of the City of Youngstown. Unlike Youngstown's previous middle-class neighborhoods, Newport Village could not be accessed by streetcars, only by automobiles. Newport Realty Company, the developers of Newport Village, required all houses to be built in either Tudor Revival or Colonial Revival styles of architecture. The layout of the neighborhood was heavily inspired by the 1922 "urban and parks design plan" designed by Massachusetts landscape architect, Warren H. Manning. Manning's efforts to expand Mill Creek Park into Boardman and to convince park leaders to create Lake Newport were essential to the development of Newport Village and its surrounding neighborhoods. A contributor to Newport Village's early success was the discriminatory housing policies of adjacent Forest Glen Estates, which prohibited first or second-generation immigrants from purchasing houses. As a result, a large portion of Newport Village's original homeowners were wealthy immigrant families.

In later decades, the neighborhood began to attract more commercial and residential development. For example, the corner of Market Street and Midlothian Boulevard was developed into a commercial center in the 1950s and is now home to strip malls, banks, and several apartment buildings. On the western side of the neighborhood, apartments were built along Glenwood Avenue and a new single family housing development was built on Stratford Road. In 2006, Newport Village became a part of the National Register of Historic Places and a historical marker was placed in a small park on the corner of Market Street and Jennette Drive. Today, the neighborhood remains mostly middle class and is one of Boardman's most desirable neighborhoods.

== Types of architecture ==
Newport Village is home to a variety of architectural styles. Jennette Drive, one of the oldest streets in the neighborhood, is known for its elaborate Tudor style homes. Nearby Chester Drive is the only street in the neighborhood that contains duplexes. The majority of its houses were originally built as duplexes but were required to only have one front door in order to make them appear to be single family houses. The remainder of the streets in Newport Village are filled with single family Colonial Revival and Tudor Revival houses, mostly of modest sizes. Though most of the neighborhood is residential, there is a commercial corridor along Market Street. Originally, Newport Realty's design standards required all commercial buildings on Market Street to be built with brick, brick veneer, stone, or stucco. However, as time went on, these design standards were relaxed. Many of these commercial buildings were mixed-use and had apartment units or offices on the second floors. Some of the original tudor style commercial buildings can still be found on Market Street alongside 1950s-era strip malls.
