= Mrs. Brisby =

Fictional character from The Secret of NIMH

- The Secret of NIMH character
- Mrs. Brisby as she appears in the 1982 film
- First appearance: The Secret of NIMH
- Based on: Mrs. Frisby (Mrs. Frisby and the Rats of NIMH)
- Adapted by: Don Bluth
- Voiced by: Elizabeth Hartman (The Secret of NIMH); Debi Mae West (The Secret of NIMH 2: Timmy to the Rescue)

In-universe information
- Nickname: Brisby
- Species: Field mouse
- Gender: Female
- Spouse: Jonathan Brisby (husband; deceased)
- Children: Teresa Brisby (older daughter); Martin Brisby (older son); Timothy Brisby (younger son); Cynthia Brisby (younger daughter)

Mrs. Brisby is a fictional field mouse and the protagonist of the 1982 animated adventure film The Secret of NIMH, directed by Don Bluth. Adapted from the 1971 children's novel, Mrs. Frisby and the Rats of NIMH, in which she is originally named "Mrs. Frisby", she is voiced by Elizabeth Hartman in her final film role, who, by her own accord, made the character sound shy and timid. She was originally named "Mrs. Frisby" during the production of the film, like the book character, but was renamed due to a trademark issue with Mattel's Frisbee.

In the 1982 film, Mrs. Brisby is a widowed mother of four children in a world inhabited by humans. She has to move her children to save them from a human-operated plow but also has to manage her son Timothy, who caught pneumonia and therefore must stay inside to recover from it. As a result, she seeks the "Rats of NIMH" to help relocate her children and home. Eventually, using a red amulet necklace that was given to her by the rat leader Nicodemus and powered by the wearer's courage, she rescues both from sinking in mud.

Since her debut, Mrs. Brisby has been mostly positively received for her timid personality combined with her kindness and courage, with critics citing her as a unique representation of a mother character who braves through an actively hostile world to save her children. Unofficially, she is also referred to as "Mrs. Elizabeth Brisby" by fans in honor of her voice actress.

== Development ==
=== Origin ===
Mrs. Brisby first appears in the 1982 film The Secret of NIMH, directed by Don Bluth, which is directly based on the fantasy/science fiction children's book Mrs. Frisby and the Rats of NIMH, which was written in 1971 by Robert C. O'Brien and illustrated by Zena Bernstein. The book won the Newbery Medal in 1972. The book's story follows a widowed field mouse named Mrs. Frisby, who cares for her four children in a farmer's garden. The farmer, Fitzgibbon, was planning on deploying his plow for his garden, meaning Mrs. Frisby had to move her family out of the garden. Because her son, according to the doctor mouse, Mr. Ages, was gravely ill and therefore could not survive having to travel out of his home, Mrs. Frisby must seek help from an old owl, and the bird informed her to seek out an intelligent rodent group called the "Rats of NIMH" (abbreviation of National Institute of Mental Health) so that they could help to relocate Mrs. Frisby's house and thereby save Timothy and the other children.

Don Bluth's independent animation career from Walt Disney Animation Studios began in 1979 when he and his colleagues Gary Goldman and John Pomeroy began experimenting with a classical style of animation that they felt was lacking in Disney's studio. After independently producing the short film Banjo the Woodpile Cat in his own Don Bluth Productions, another film production company called Aurora Productions contacted them, offering them a budget for a feature film. Bluth and sixteen other people left Disney to produce the movie. Bluth, in his autobiography, praised the story told in Mrs. Frisby and the Rats of NIMH, speculating that Walt Disney would have adapted it into a movie if O'Brien contacted him while both were still alive.

=== Characterization and design ===
Brisby's inner strength was inspired by Bluth's grandmother. "She had 13 children, and her husband died when the oldest was 18," Bluth says. "Mrs. Brisby reminded me of her. I thought, Here's little Brisby, who could be a pathetic and plain little creature wandering around saying 'Somebody help me!' But she’s not. She's more like, 'Whatever I have to do to save my family, I will do.' That’s a strong theme going throughout the film. She's surrounded by dangers."

— John Maher, Vulture

Consistent with O'Brien's book, Don Bluth went on to make Mrs. Frisby the protagonist of his adaptation. In the film, Mrs. Brisby is a field mouse who has brown fur and dons a red cape. She is a widowed mother who cares for her four children and lives with a housekeeper named Auntie Shrew. Mrs. Brisby is kind and soft-spoken in personality, but in a mournful state due to the death of her husband which occurred before the film's events. Throughout the film, her forename and maiden name are never revealed. Mrs. Brisby's emotional strength was drawn from that of Bluth's grandmother. Bluth wrote that the "timid yet brave Mrs. Frisby" reminded him of his grandmother because she worked hard to care for her thirteen children and always advised him whenever he visited her as a child, "Whatever problem you have, just put your shoulder to that wheel and go forward." The film director explained that instead of being "a pathetic and plain little creature" who was always begging for help, Mrs. Brisby does whatever she can to save her family when surrounded by danger.

Bluth aimed to make the characters of The Secret of NIMH, especially Mrs. Brisby, believable. In order to achieve that, he ensured that audiences were not reminded that she was drawn from a pencil so that audiences could identify with her. The film's smooth animation was combined with large amounts of lighting plus shading to convey different tones, such as the suspense that was built up when Mrs. Brisby visited the Great Owl. As many as 46 different color palettes of Mrs. Brisby were created so that she appeared in different levels of shading throughout the film. Mrs. Brisby was likely difficult to animate due to her delicate gestures consistent with her timid personality, which were in contrast to the more exaggerated movements of her friend, a comedic crow named Jeremy.

Brisby's characterization in the film compared to that of Mrs. Frisby from the original book is one of several major differences between the two mediums. For instance, in the former, Mrs. Brisby is portrayed as vulnerable and largely dependent on both the wizard Nicodemus and her deceased husband, Jonathan Brisby, and the doctor Mr. Ages' poor treatment of her further highlights her passiveness. Her personality and motivation are shaped by those around her, and she is subservient plus frequently apologetic to most other characters from Mr. Ages to Auntie Shrew, thus making her character mostly powerless emotionally. In comparison, Mrs. Frisby from the beginning served as an initial leader character who could cunningly navigate through obstacles and provide for her family independently of other male characters despite having been widowed. The film's change in the widowed mouse's personality is due to its greater emphasis on her personal development for independence and strength - she starts out timid and fearful but finds both bravery and strength in the love for her children and willingness to do anything it takes to keep them safe.

=== Voice and name change ===
We fell silent and gaped at one another. "There," said David [Horten]'s voice from the speaker. "No one will ever know the difference. Stop your caterwauling and let's get back to work." He had to scrape countless Fs off the tape and replace them with Bs, but that did the trick.

— Don Bluth, Somewhere Out There: My Animated Life

In his autobiography, Bluth wrote that he knew that the vocal performance role of Mrs. Brisby would be inherently challenging. He feared that a less capable voice actress would have a whiny tone while reading through the film's lines. Actress Elizabeth Hartman made her return to Los Angeles, California, and accepted the voice role for Mrs. Brisby in 1982 as her last media role before returning home. Bluth recalled that Hartman "read the lines with an ever-so-slight tremble to her voice, turning Mrs. Brisby into a timid and unsure character," making the fictional mouse easier to sympathize with. He thought that Hartman was cleverly reading Brisby's lines but eventually realized that her voice acting reflected her depression in reality when he learned that the actress took her own life in 1987. Since the tragedy, the director wrote that he found it emotionally painful to rewatch The Secret of NIMH.

The production crew learned that they were unable to use the name "Frisby" due to trademark issues over Mattel's Frisbee throwing disc. Because the voice lines were already recorded, the crew were faced with the threat of having to re-record the lines at a detrimental financial cost. However, industrial sound designer, David Horten, used a razor blade to scrape the magnetic track, splicing the "F" sound in "Frisby" into a "B" sound for one scene. He then played the audio of the Great Owl stating, "Brisby ... Mrs. Jonathan Brisby?" to the surprise of the crew. Later he spliced many "F"s into "B"s.

== Appearances ==
=== Films ===
==== The Secret of NIMH ====
Mrs. Brisby has been the sole parent of her four children since the death of her husband, Jonathan Brisby, and plans on having her family move out from the human farm before the plow from human farmers start plowing. The mouse doctor, Mr. Ages, informs Mrs. Brisby that one of her children, Timothy, is sick from pneumonia and must stay home to recover. While traveling home with her medicine for Timothy, she befriends a clumsy crow named Jeremy, whom she frees from string entanglement. Afterwards, she visits the Great Owl, who advises her to seek a mysterious rat faction known as the "Rats of NIMH."

She enters the rose bush and meets different members of the Rats of NIMH including Captain Justin, Jenner, and their leader, Nicodemus. Nicodemus informs Mrs. Brisby of her husband's contributions in helping the rats escape from the institution NIMH and gives her a red amulet that is powered by the wearer's courage. The rats agree to help her, and Mrs. Brisby volunteers to drug the cat, Dragon, but she is captured by the farmer's son. Overhearing that NIMH members are arriving to kill the residential rats, she escapes from her cage to warn her fellow rodents to leave their area. Jenner, refusing to allow the others to leave, attacks her but ends up fighting Justin, eventually getting killed. Brisby's house, containing her children, begins to sink into mud, but she manages to lift the structure and save her children because of her amulet's power. The morning after, Timothy recovers from his sickness.

==== The Secret of NIMH 2: Timmy to the Rescue ====
Mrs. Brisby plays a minor role in the 1998 direct-to-video sequel, now older and making two appearances throughout the film. Instead, her son Timothy Brisby is the protagonist of the film.

=== Other appearances ===
The lead characters of The Secret of NIMH made brief appearances in the form of dressed actors in departmental stores, as well as different forms of merchandise for promoting the film. Little Golden Books, a publication company for children's books, published the spinoff children's book Mrs. Brisby and the Magic Stone in 1982.

== Reception ==
Mrs. Brisby has been positively received by critics because of her timidity, motherly nature, and exceptional courage. Tyler B. Searle of Collider attributed the acclaimed story of The Secret of NIMH to Brisby's personality, calling her "one of the greatest portrayals of the power of motherhood in cinema." The Screen Rant writer, Sara Schmidt, commended Don Bluth for directing a story about "a strong, layered woman [for] the big screen much earlier than Disney did." Sean P. Anne of The Nerdy pointed out that the movie was unique not only for being oriented towards action compared to most other animated films of its time but also for starring a widowed mother as the heroic protagonist with a "strong character even if she doesn’t realize by how much at the beginning of the film." Laura Jameson from Haven Lock wrote that the film repeatedly exemplified the "strength of a mother’s love" from Mrs. Brisby, that her drive to protect her children at all costs could be relatable to many real-life mothers. Similarly, the authors Stephen H. Segal and Valya Dudycz Lupescu cited Brisby as a role model for parents due to her "extraordinary courage" to save her children despite having been an "unassuming parent."

Because of her generally likable personality, combined with the harsh challenges she faces, writers of multiple publications have stated that audiences could identify with the character to the point of rooting for her and celebrating her successes. 411MANIA author Aaron Hubbard praised the story for taking advantage of the "sympathetic" Brisby being "small and kind of helpless" as a mouse but progressing through major obstacles thanks to her "great resolve and inner strength." Critics of multiple newspaper publications that date to 1982 appreciated that while Mrs. Brisby is a shy and timid individual that she is able to muster up strength and courage over the course of her journey. On the other hand, Chris Case of The Michigan Daily criticized Mrs. Brisby's portrayal as a gloomy individual who has to constantly beg for help. The New York Times critic Vincent Canby commented that her character was "colorless" and unlikely to catch the attention of young children, but he recognized Elizabeth Hartman for matching up with the fictional character in her voice acting. Hartman's vocal performance of Mrs. Brisby was also well-received by critics, with book author Neil Sharpson calling it "Hartman’s defining role."

Writers have also considered Mrs. Brisby as the best part of the film as she took large risks to save her children by facing some of her greatest fears. Film Inquiry co-writer Aaron Berry called her "adorable" and his favorite movie hero because she is neither "the biggest [n]or strongest, but the one who will go out of their comfort zone and go even further to keep what they could risk losing." Justin Howe of Fantasy Magazine stated that he admired that Mrs. Brisby was not subjected to another marriage by the end of the film and that the film allowed her to "flaunt social conventions and go unpunished" in an instance of "true socially progressive work." Jesse Hassenger of Fox 29 attributed the film's narrative success to Mrs. Brisby being "the whole movie" instead of a "disposable plot engine" who could be written off to spotlight her children. Mrs. Brisby has been commonly named by fans as "Mrs. Elizabeth Brisby" in honor of her voice actress, although the commentators of Reactor expressed annoyance at how most other characters only valued her because of her connection with her late husband as evident by the lack of any knowledge of a first name. One expressed how she found the character's struggle to save her children in an otherwise "mostly uncaring and often contemptuous world" could garner close sympathy from most mothers. Neil Sharpson explained that he found Mrs. Brisby to be a unique character with no modern film protagonist analogues in that she is not a conventionally "strong" or wisecracking hero, but one who endures an actively hostile world because she "is not fearless, she is brave." In an academic journal, the author Hannah Sophie Schiffner noted that Mrs. Brisby was amongst the rising trope of heroic mice in children's films from the late 1970s onwards who have enough character agencies to challenge societal norms.
