= Elizabeth Hartman =

American actress (1943–1987)

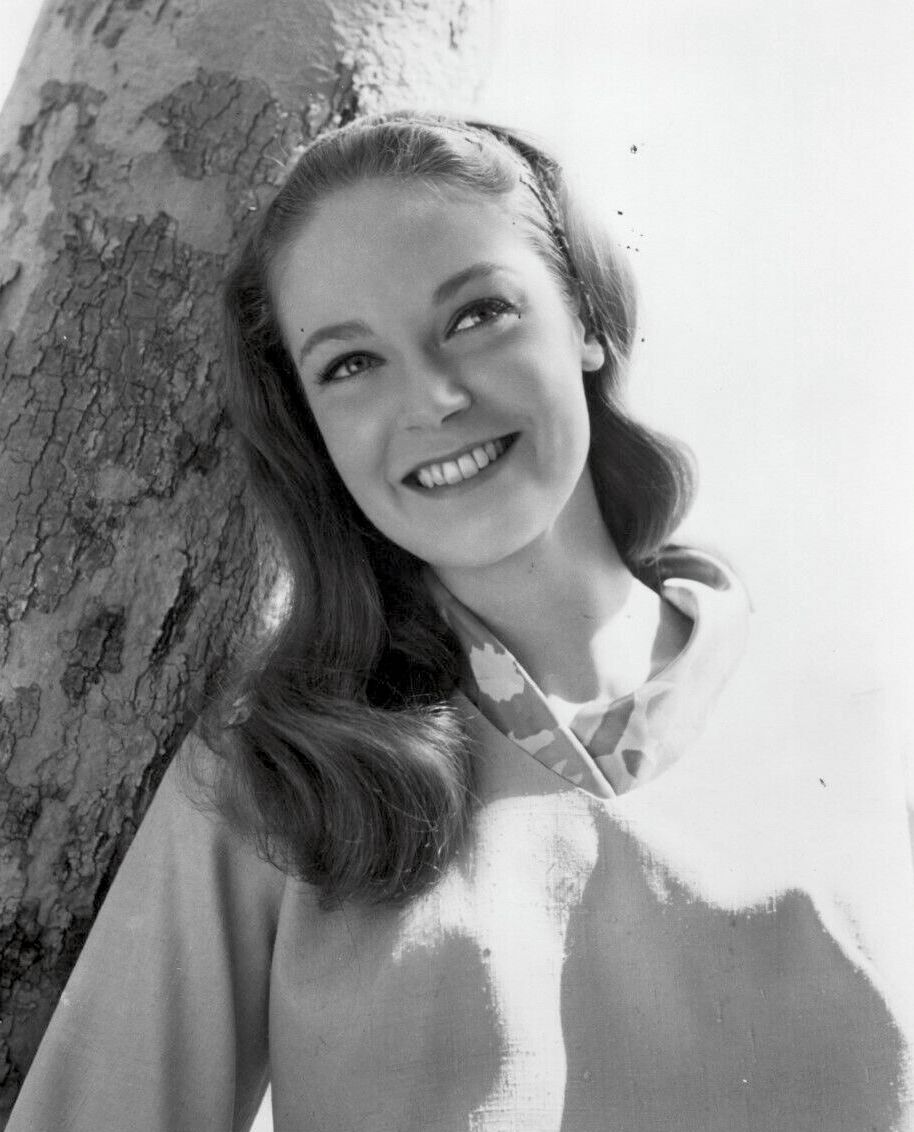
- Hartman in 1966
- Born: Mary Elizabeth Hartman; December 23, 1943; Youngstown, Ohio, U.S.
- Died: June 10, 1987 (aged 43); Pittsburgh, Pennsylvania, U.S.
- Resting place: Forest Lawn Memorial Park
- Occupation: Actress
- Years active: 1964–1982
- Spouse: Gill Dennis (m. 1968; div. 1984)

Mary Elizabeth Hartman (December 23, 1943 – June 10, 1987) was an American actress of stage and screen. She debuted in the film A Patch of Blue (1965), playing a blind girl named Selina D'Arcy, opposite Sidney Poitier, a role for which she was nominated for an Academy Award for Best Actress and a Golden Globe Award for Best Actress, and won the Golden Globe Award for New Star of the Year.

She appeared in Francis Ford Coppola's You're a Big Boy Now (1966) as Barbara Darling, for which she was nominated for a second Golden Globe Award. She also starred in Don Siegel's The Beguiled (1971), opposite Clint Eastwood and Geraldine Page, and Walking Tall (1973).

Hartman voiced Mrs. Brisby in Don Bluth's first animated feature, The Secret of NIMH (1982). This proved to be her last Hollywood film and TV role, as well as her only animated role.

On June 10, 1987, Hartman died after jumping from the window of her fifth-floor apartment. Earlier that morning, she had reportedly called her psychiatrist saying that she felt despondent. Hartman was buried at Forest Lawn Memorial Park in Youngstown, Ohio.

== Early life ==
Mary Elizabeth Hartman was born December 23, 1943, in Youngstown, Ohio, the daughter of Claire (née Mullaly) and B.C. Hartman. She had a sister, Janet, and a brother, William. She was a standout dramatic student at Boardman High School, where she graduated in 1961. She won a statewide award for best actress in a high school production for her performance as Laura in The Glass Menagerie. She performed in several productions at the Youngstown Playhouse during her youth, including A Clearing in the Woods by Arthur Laurents and Our Town. She attended Carnegie Mellon University in Pittsburgh, where she met her future husband, Gill Dennis, and spent her summers acting with the Kenley Players.

Hartman also performed at the Cleveland Play House in several productions, including The Madwoman of Chaillot and Bus Stop. She was encouraged to move to New York City and begin auditioning for plays there. In 1964, Hartman was signed to play the ingénue lead in the comedy Everybody Out, the Castle is Sinking, which was not a success; however, her performance was again positively received, and film producers took notice.

== Career ==
All this has happened so fast, I'm kind of misplaced. I'm just drifting around. I'm in a very strange state of mind. I used to know who Biff was, but I don't, now. I'm suddenly in a different kind of world.

— Elizabeth Hartman, 1965

In 1964, Hartman was screen-tested by Metro-Goldwyn-Mayer and Warner Brothers. In the early autumn of 1964, she was cast in the leading role in A Patch of Blue, opposite Sidney Poitier and Shelley Winters. Hartman won widespread critical acclaim for her performance, a fact proudly noted by the news media in her hometown, and was nominated for an Academy Award for Best Actress. During this time, her father, who worked in construction, died. At the time of her nomination in 1966, Hartman (who was 23 years old) was the youngest nominee ever in the Best Actress category. That same year, she received an achievement award from the National Association of Theatre Owners. Hartman also won a Golden Globe for New Star of the Year for her performance. In 1966, she starred as Laura opposite Mercedes McCambridge as Amanda in a production of The Glass Menagerie in Pittsburgh.

In January 1967, columnist Dorothy Manners reported that Hartman had been cast in the role of Neely O'Hara in the movie version of Valley of the Dolls, beating out some more famous Hollywood actresses. She had allegedly made a successful screen test winning over director Mark Robson and producer David Weisbart, the former already enthralled with her performance in You're a Big Boy Now. However, the following month, it was announced that Oscar-winner Patty Duke had signed on to play Neely, albeit against her agent's advice. Duke's over the top performance almost ruined her career.

Between the mid-1960s and early 1970s, Hartman appeared in three well-received films, two of which starred Broadway and Hollywood legend Geraldine Page, The Group (1966), You're a Big Boy Now (1966), and The Beguiled (1971). Portraying Pauline Mullins, the wife of former Sheriff Buford Pusser, she starred in the cult classic and major box office hit Walking Tall (1973). In 1975, Hartman starred in the premiere of Thomas Rickman's play Balaam, a play about political intrigue in Washington, D.C. The production was mounted in Old Town Pasadena, California, by the Pasadena Repertory Theatre located in The Hotel Carver. It was directed by Hartman's husband, Gill Dennis. In 1981, she starred in a touring production of Morning's at Seven, but left the tour due to declining mental health. Her last on-screen performance was in 1981's horror-spoof, Full Moon High, where she appeared as Miss Montgomery. In 1982, she appeared in Don Bluth's The Secret of NIMH, where she portrayed the film's protagonist, Mrs. Brisby. She was highly praised for the performance; however, this proved to be her last Hollywood film role, as well as her only animated role.

== Later years and death ==
Throughout much of her life, Hartman suffered from depression. In 1978, she was treated at the Institute of Living in Hartford, Connecticut. In 1984, she divorced her husband, screenwriter Gill Dennis, after a five-year separation. In the last few years of her life, she quit acting and worked at a museum in Pittsburgh while receiving treatment for her condition at an outpatient clinic. In 1981, she returned to theater, portraying Myrtle Brown in a regional stage production of Morning's at Seven. Her sister and caretaker, Janet, told the Los Angeles Times:

She was very suicidal... As soon as I arrived, she took an overdose of sleeping pills and was rushed to intensive care. But, the next night, she appeared on stage and she was wonderful. I spent two weeks with her to try to get her to the theater every night. She was frightened of everyone and everything. We'd go to breakfast, and she'd get up and dash out as though somebody was after her.

On June 10, 1987, Hartman died by suicide, leaping to her death from the window of her fifth-floor Pittsburgh apartment. She was 43 years old. Earlier that morning, according to the Allegheny County Medical Examiner's Office, she had reportedly called her psychiatrist saying that she felt despondent. Hartman was buried at Forest Lawn Memorial Park in the suburb of her hometown.

== Filmography ==
=== Film ===
Year	Title	Role	Director(s)	Notes	Ref.
1965	A Patch of Blue	Selina D'Arcey	Guy Green		
1966	The Group	Priss Hartshorn	Sidney Lumet		
1966	You're a Big Boy Now	Barbara Darling	Francis Ford Coppola		
1968	The Fixer	Zinaida Lebedev	John Frankenheimer		
1971	The Beguiled	Edwina Dabney	Don Siegel		
1972	In Pursuit of Treasure		Stanton Kaye		
1973	Walking Tall	Pauline Pusser	Phil Karlson		
1981	Full Moon High	Miss Montgomery	Larry Cohen		
1982	The Secret of NIMH	Mrs. Brisby	Don Bluth	Voice; final film role	

=== Television ===
Year	Title	Role	Notes	Ref.
1971	Night Gallery	Judith Timm	Episode: "The Dark Boy"	
1973	Love, American Style	Wilma More	Segment: "Love and the Locksmith"; Uncredited	
1975	Wide World Mystery	Camilla	Episode: "A Little Bit Like Murder"	
1975	Doctors' Hospital	Bobbie Marks	Episode: "Come at Last to Love"	
1980	Willow B: Women in Prison	Helen	Jeff Bleckner	Television movie; also known as A Matter of Survival

== Stage credits ==
Year	Title	Role	Notes	Ref.
1966	The Glass Menagerie	Laura Wingfield	Pittsburgh	
1969	Our Town	Emily Webb	ANTA Playhouse	
1975	Balaam	Female lead	Pasadena Repertory Theatre (world premiere)	
1981	Morning's at Seven	Myrtle Brown	The national touring company	

== Accolades ==
Award	Year	Category	Nominated work	Outcome	Ref.
Academy Awards	1965	Best Actress	A Patch of Blue	Nominated	
Golden Globe Awards	1965	Golden Globe for New Star of the Year	A Patch of Blue	Won	
Golden Globe Awards	1965	Best Actress – Motion Picture Drama	A Patch of Blue	Nominated	
Golden Globe Awards	1966	Best Actress – Motion Picture Musical or Comedy	You're a Big Boy Now	Nominated	

== See also ==
- List of oldest and youngest Academy Award winners and nominees

== Sources ==
- Frasier, David K. (2005). Suicide in the Entertainment Industry: An Encyclopedia of 840 Twentieth Century Cases. McFarland. ISBN 978-1-476-60807-5.
