= A Patch of Blue =

1965 film by Guy Green

- Theatrical release poster
- Directed by: Guy Green
- Screenplay by: Guy Green
- Based on: Be Ready with Bells and Drums; 1961 novel by Elizabeth Kata
- Produced by: Guy Green; Pandro S. Berman
- Starring: Sidney Poitier; Shelley Winters; Elizabeth Hartman; Wallace Ford
- Cinematography: Robert Burks
- Edited by: Rita Roland
- Music by: Jerry Goldsmith
- Distributed by: Metro-Goldwyn-Mayer
- Release date: December 10, 1965
- Running time: 105 minutes
- Country: United States
- Language: English
- Budget: $800,000
- Box office: $6,750,000 (rentals)

A Patch of Blue is a 1965 American drama film directed and written by Guy Green about the friendship between an educated black man (played by Sidney Poitier) and an illiterate, blind, white 18-year-old girl (played by Elizabeth Hartman in her film debut), and the problems that plague their friendship in a racially divided America. Made in 1965 against the backdrop of the growing civil rights movement, the film explores racism while playing on the idea that "love is blind."

Shelley Winters won the Academy Award for Best Supporting Actress, her second win for the award, following her victory in 1959 for The Diary of Anne Frank. It was the final screen appearance for veteran actor Wallace Ford.

Scenes of Poitier and Hartman kissing were cut from the film when it was shown in film theaters in the Southern United States. These scenes are intact in the DVD version. According to the DVD audio commentary, it was the decision of director Guy Green that A Patch of Blue be filmed in black and white although color was available.

The film was adapted by Guy Green from the 1961 book Be Ready with Bells and Drums by the Australian author Elizabeth Kata. The book later won a Writers Guild of America award. The book's plot has a slightly less optimistic ending than the film.

In addition to the Best Supporting Actress win for Winters, the film was nominated for Academy Awards for Best Actress in a Leading Role (Elizabeth Hartman), Best Art Direction-Set Decoration (Black-and-White) (George Davis, Urie McCleary, Henry Grace, Charles S. Thompson), Best Cinematography (Black-and-White) and Best Music (Original Music Score). Hartman, 22 at the time, was the youngest Best Actress nominee, a record she held for 10 years before 20-year-old Isabelle Adjani broke her record in 1975.

== Plot ==
Selina D'Arcey is a blind white girl living in a city apartment with her crude and vulgar mother Rose-Ann, who works as a prostitute, and her grandfather Ole Pa. She strings beads to supplement her family's small income and spends most of her time doing chores. Her mother is abusive, and Ole Pa is an alcoholic. Selina has no friends, rarely leaves the apartment, and has never received an education.

Selina convinces her grandfather to take her to the park, where she meets Gordon Ralfe, an educated and soft-spoken black man working night shifts in an office. The two become friends, meeting at the park almost every day. Gordon learns that she was blinded at age five when Rose-Ann threw chemicals on her while attempting to hit her husband and that she was raped by one of Rose-Ann's "boyfriends."

Rose-Ann's friend Sadie is also a prostitute, and she realizes that Selina can be useful in their business. Rose-Ann and Sadie decide to leave Ole Pa, move with Selina into a better apartment, and force her into prostitution.

In the meantime, Gordon has contacted a school for the blind, which is ready to take Selina. While Rose-Ann is out, Selina runs away to the park and meets Gordon. She tells him about Rose-Ann's plan, and he assures her that she will be leaving for school in a few days. Finding Selina missing from the apartment, Rose-Ann takes Ole Pa to the park and confronts Gordon. Despite Rose-Ann's resistance, Gordon takes Selina away. Ole Pa then stops Rose-Ann from chasing after them, telling her that Selina is not a child anymore.

At Gordon's house, Selina asks Gordon to marry her, to which he replies that there are many types of love, and she will realize that their relationship will not work. Selina tells him that she loves him and knows that he is black and his skin color doesn't matter to her. Gordon tells her she must meet more people and wait a year to find out whether their love is more than friendship. A bus arrives to pick up Selina for her trip to the school, and the two say goodbye. Gordon has given Selina a music box that belonged to his grandmother. When she leaves it in the apartment, he runs after her to give it back but misses the bus and walks back upstairs to his apartment building.

== Cast ==
- Sidney Poitier as Gordon Ralfe
- Shelley Winters as Rose-Ann D'Arcey
- Elizabeth Hartman as Selina D'Arcey
  - Debi Storm as Selina D'Arcey, Age 5
- Wallace Ford as Ole Pa
- Ivan Dixon as Mark Ralfe
- Elisabeth Fraser as Sadie
- John Qualen as Mr. Faber
- Kelly Flynn as Yanek Faber
- Renata Vanni as Mrs. Favaloro
- Saverio LoMedico as Mr. Favaloro
- Casey Merriman as Casey M.

== Production ==
Guy Green bought the rights for himself. He made the film at MGM after another film he was going to make for that studio, The Forty Days of Musa Dagh, did not happen.

== Reception ==
=== Critical reception ===
The New York Times was critical: "There is no doubt about the good intentions of those who produced 'A Patch of Blue,'....But for the most part this little drama...seems a compound of specious contrivance. Miss Hartman...is just a wee bit too tidy and sweet...The action is too patly formulated, and Mr. Poitier, who is an honest performer, has to act like a saint. Why should it be, in a film of this nature...that the cold-water flat in which the heroine lives...looks like any phony slum apartment fabricated by the art department of a studio? And why should it be that the tune the girl is humming when the man comes upon her in the park is 'Over the Rainbow?' Why should they leap and frolic like a couple of Disney kids on a shopping spree in a supermarket? And why should she discover a French music box that plays a little tune that he sings, in French, when she first visits his apartment? These are small things, but many more like them, strung together in a get-this-clearly way, give an air of artificial fictionalizing to what should be a casual, gritty, human, throbbing film."

The Chicago Tribune wrote: "That storied shrew, the Wicked Stepmother, is back again. This time she's played by Shelley Winters, who is not actually a step relative...but is wicked enough to make anyone see red....Not woman enough to do a solo set in sadism, Shelley shares her apartment with another Mean Person, a gin-guzzling grandfather....The park is the girl's salvation, for there she meets a young man who opens up a new world to her. As played by Sidney Poitier, he is both kind and practical, never patronizing.....As Selina, newcome Hartman extracts what she can from the mawkish, melodramatic script and effectively captures the personality nuances of the pale, gaunt girl whose frightened-rabbit isolation in the bleak apartment is transformed into a childlike exuberance in the park where a patch of green becomes her patch of blue."

The Time magazine review was mixed: "'A Patch of Blue' takes some getting used to. It starts as a pointless little tearjerker, then turns abruptly into contemporary hope opera. To save it from itself requires extraordinary skill, and the movie is fortunate in having miracle workers at hand....Luckily, Director Guy Green...has a knack for sustaining the sort of idea that in lesser hands might easily slip from pathos into bathos. Green's style is simple, forceful and true, and he habitually activates a performer's most astonishing inner resources. The prize of his present cast is 21-year-old film fledgling Elizabeth Hartman....Patch of Blue flirts openly with the issue of interracial love, only to leave it unresolved in the last reel, and the film's message becomes almost immaterial. In their quiet, tender scenes together, Hartman and Poitier conquer the insipidity of a plot that reduces tangled human problems to a case of the black leading the blind."

A Patch of Blue has an 89% approval rating on Rotten Tomatoes, based on nine reviews.

=== Box-office ===
The film proved to be the most successful in Poitier's career, which proved a lucrative development considering he agreed to a salary cut in exchange for 10% of the film's gross earnings. In addition, the film made Poitier a major national film star with excellent business in even southern cities like Houston, Atlanta and Charlotte.

=== Awards and nominations ===
Award	Category	Nominee(s)	Result	Ref.
Academy Awards	Best Actress	Elizabeth Hartman	Nominated	
Academy Awards	Best Supporting Actress	Shelley Winters	Won	
Academy Awards	Best Art Direction – Black-and-White	Art Direction: George Davis and Urie McCleary; Set Decoration: Henry Grace and Charles S. Thompson	Nominated	
Academy Awards	Best Cinematography – Black-and-White	Robert Burks	Nominated	
Academy Awards	Best Music Score – Substantially Original	Jerry Goldsmith	Nominated	
British Academy Film Awards	Best Foreign Actor	Sidney Poitier	Nominated	
Golden Globe Awards	Best Motion Picture – Drama		Nominated	
Golden Globe Awards	Best Director – Motion Picture	Guy Green	Nominated	
Golden Globe Awards	Best Screenplay – Motion Picture	Guy Green	Nominated	
Golden Globe Awards	Best Actor in a Motion Picture – Drama	Sidney Poitier	Nominated	
Golden Globe Awards	Best Actress in a Motion Picture – Drama	Elizabeth Hartman	Nominated	
Golden Globe Awards	Most Promising Newcomer – Female	Elizabeth Hartman	Won	
Kansas City Film Critics Circle Awards	Best Supporting Actress	Shelley Winters	Won	
Laurel Awards	Top Drama		Nominated	
Laurel Awards	Top Male Dramatic Performance	Sidney Poitier	Won	
Laurel Awards	Top Female Dramatic Performance	Elizabeth Hartman	Nominated	
Laurel Awards	Top Male Supporting Performance	Wallace Ford	Nominated	
Laurel Awards	Top Female Supporting Performance	Shelley Winters	Won	
Writers Guild of America Awards	Best Written American Drama	Guy Green	Nominated	

== Soundtrack ==
The soundtrack to A Patch of Blue was composed and conducted by Jerry Goldsmith. It gained Goldsmith his second Academy Award nomination for Best Original Score following his score to Freud in 1962. It was one of the 250 nominated scores for the American Film Institute's top 25 American film scores. The score has been released three times on CD; in 1991 through Mainstream Records (with the score to David and Lisa by Mark Lawrence), in 1992 through Tsunami Records (with his score to Patton), and an extended version in 1997 through Intrada Records.

== A Cinderella Named Elizabeth ==
The film's creators also made a short film about Hartman's selection to play the starring role. The short, titled A Cinderella Named Elizabeth, focuses on her status as an unknown actress from Youngstown, Ohio, and includes segments from her screen test and associated "personality test", in which the actress is filmed while being herself and answering questions about everyday topics such as her taste in clothing. The short also shows her visiting the Braille Institute of America to watch blind people being trained to do handwork – similar to the beadwork her character does in the film – and to perform tasks of daily living and self-care, of the sort that Poitier's character teaches Selina to do.

== See also ==
- Civil rights movement in popular culture
- List of American films of 1965
