= John Greco =

American football player (born 1985)

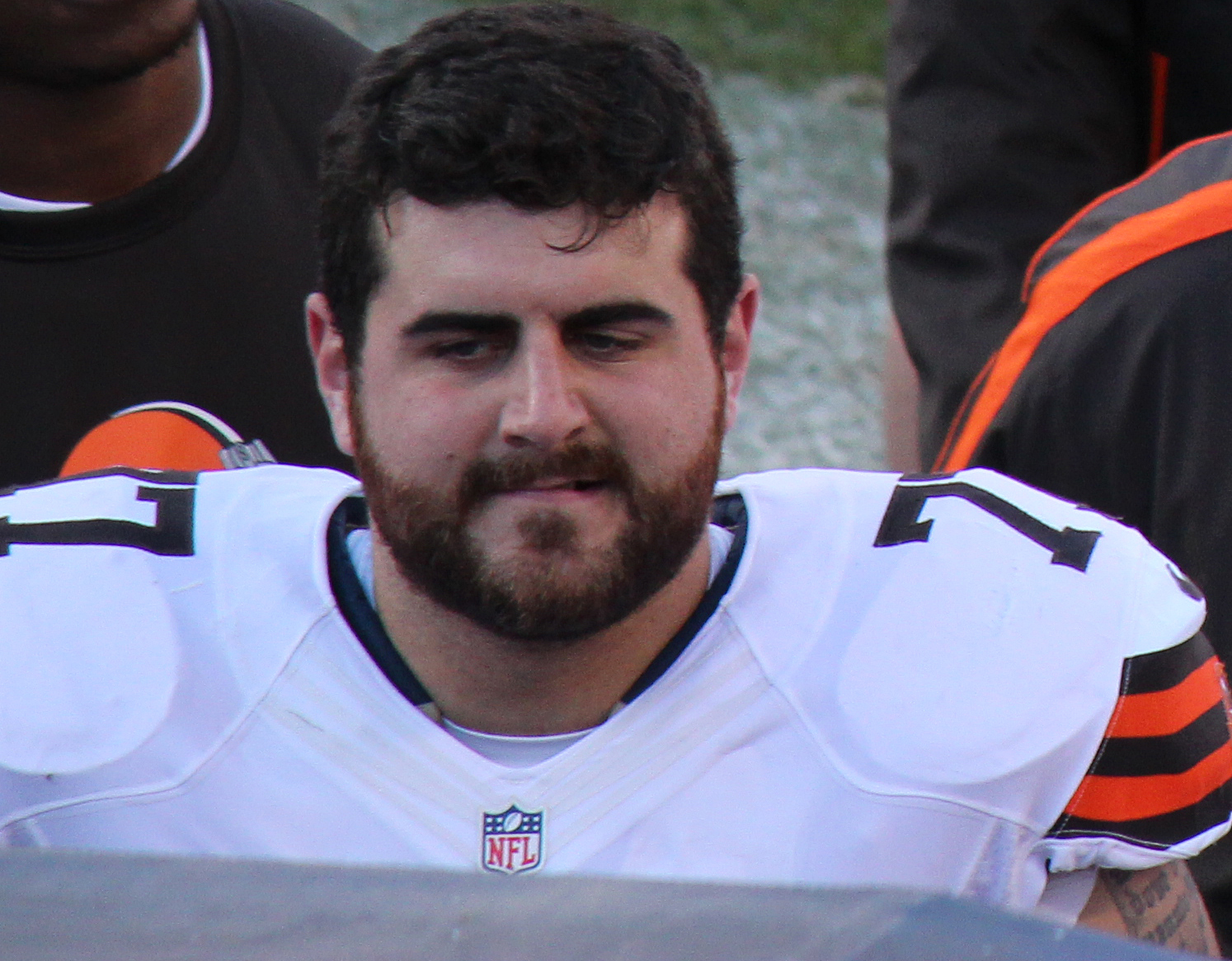
- Greco with the Cleveland Browns in 2012

No. 73, 77, 79
- Position: Guard

Personal information
- Born: March 24, 1985 (age 41); Youngstown, Ohio, U.S.
- Listed height: 6 ft 4 in (1.93 m)
- Listed weight: 318 lb (144 kg)

Career information
- High school: Boardman (OH)
- College: Toledo
- NFL draft: 2008: 3rd round, 65th overall pick

Career history
- St. Louis Rams (2008–2010); Cleveland Browns (2011–2016); New Orleans Saints (2017); New York Giants (2017–2018)

Awards and highlights
- 3× All-MAC (2005, 2006, 2007)

Career NFL statistics
- Games played: 132
- Games started: 77
- Stats at Pro Football Reference

John Patrick Greco, Jr. (born March 24, 1985) is an American former professional football player who was a guard in the National Football League (NFL). He was selected by the St. Louis Rams in the third round of the 2008 NFL draft. He played college football at the University of Toledo.

== Early life ==
Greco was named First-team All-Conference and Second-team All-region as a senior and was Second-team All-Conference as a junior at Boardman High School in Youngstown, Ohio.

== College career ==
At the University of Toledo, he was a three-time All-MAC honoree at left tackle. As a freshman, in 2004, he started at right tackle. In college, he allowed 6.5 sacks in two years. He started 36 games and recorded 275 knockdowns and 34 touchdown-resulting blocks during his three seasons at left tackle. In 2007, he started all 12 games for Toledo and earned First-team All-MAC for the third consecutive season and was a Third-team All-America by Rivals.com after allowing only three sacks on 411 pass plays. As a junior in 2006 he was the team co-captain started all 13 games at left tackle, earning First-team All-MAC honors. As a sophomore in 2005 Greco was First-team All-MAC in his first season at left tackle. He took over left tackle position after graduation of Nick Kaczur. He opened holes for an offense that ranked 13th in the nation in rushing (216.8 yards per game) and 10th in scoring (25.8 points per game). As a freshman in 2004 he started all 13 games at right tackle and earned the team's top freshman award. He redshirted as a true freshman in 2003.

== Professional career ==
Pre-draft measurables
| Height | Weight | 40-yard dash | 10-yard split | 20-yard split | 20-yard shuttle | Three-cone drill | Vertical jump | Broad jump | Bench press | Wonderlic |
|---|---|---|---|---|---|---|---|---|---|---|
| 6 ft 4 3/4 in (1.95 m) | 305 lb (138 kg) | 5.16 s | 1.70 s | 2.97 s | 4.63 s | 7.78 s | 32 in (0.81 m) | 9 ft 0 in (2.74 m) | 30 reps | 28 |
All from Toledo Pro Day, except Ht and Wt, which are from NFL Combine.

=== St. Louis Rams ===
Greco was selected 65th overall in the third round for the St. Louis Rams in the 2008 NFL Draft. On June 12, 2008, Greco signed a three-year, $1.794 million contract with the Rams, with the deal including a $644,000 signing bonus. He spent 2008 as a backup; due to injuries he started one game at the end of the 2008 NFL season.

=== Cleveland Browns ===
After three seasons in St. Louis, the Rams traded Greco to the Cleveland Browns for a conditional seventh round draft pick in the 2012 NFL draft on July 31, 2011. Greco started 12 games in the 2012 season, after an injury to Jason Pinkston. He played very well, finishing among the highest ranked guards in the league for blocking percentage.

On July 23, 2013, Greco signed a five-year contract extension with the Browns, worth a maximum of $13 million with $3 million guaranteed. On October 12, 2014, Greco played at center for the first time of his career after Alex Mack left due to a broken fibula.

Greco would miss the last two games of the 2015 season due to spraining one of his MCLs.

In 2016, Greco started 12 games at right guard and center and didn't miss an offensive snap all season before sustaining a foot injury in Week 12 of the 2016 season and was placed on injured reserve on November 28, 2016.

On September 2, 2017, Greco was released by the Browns.

=== New Orleans Saints ===
On October 4, 2017, Greco was signed by the New Orleans Saints. He was released on November 8, 2017.

=== New York Giants ===
On November 14, 2017, Greco signed with the New York Giants.

On February 21, 2018, Greco re-signed with the Giants. He played in 15 games, starting seven at both center and right guard.
