= Peter Rabbit (TV series) =

Children's animated television series

- Based on: The Tale of Peter Rabbit by Beatrix Potter
- Developed by: Cathal Gaffney
- Directed by: Darragh O'Connell
- Voices of: See below
- Theme music composer: Peter Lurye
- Opening theme: "Let's Go!" by Chris Madin
- Ending theme: "Peter Rabbit" by Chris Madin
- Composer: Stuart Kollmorgen
- Countries of origin: United Kingdom; Ireland; United States
- No. of seasons: 2
- No. of episodes: 56

Production
- Executive producers: Paula Rosenthal; Cathal Gaffney; Darragh O'Connell; Mary Durkan; Ronnie Fairweather; Francesca Dow
- Producers: Karen Ialacci; Gillian Higgins; Erik Vignau
- Running time: 22 minutes
- Production companies: Brown Bag Films; Penguin Books; Silvergate Media; Nickelodeon Productions

Original release
- Network: CBeebies (UK); Nickelodeon (United States)
- Release: 14 December 2012 – 6 May 2016

Peter Rabbit is an animated comedy television series that debuted on the Nick Jr. Channel and iTunes on 14 December 2012, in the United States and on CBeebies and BBC One on 25 December 2012, in the United Kingdom, with the pilot episode debuting as a Christmas holiday special, titled "Peter Rabbit's Christmas Tale". It is based on the character of the same name from Beatrix Potter's children’s books. The show became a regular series on 19 February 2013, in the USA. The first official DVD of Peter Rabbit was released on 28 May 2013, as a Walmart exclusive. It contains the programme's first eight episodes on a single disc. On 11 October 2013, Nickelodeon ordered a second series of 26 episodes. In Wales, the series is known as Guto Gwningen and is dubbed into Welsh on S4C. A springtime holiday special episode, titled "The Tale of the Start of Spring", aired on 29 March 2013, on iTunes and in the USA.

Series 1 concluded on 7 October 2014. The programme ran for a total of two series before concluding on 6 May 2016. It was produced for Nickelodeon in the US by Brown Bag Films, Penguin Books and Silvergate Media. The programme still airs reruns on CBeebies in the UK.

The programme features educational goals that encourage preschoolers to learn problem-solving, interpersonal skills, awareness, self-efficacy, resilience, positive re-framing and fostering an interest in and respect for nature.

== Synopsis ==
The programme features and revolves around the titular character Peter Rabbit as he overcomes obstacles, outwits predators and avoids danger. Peter wants to grow up to be just like his late father and carries his journal (a guide on how to be a good rabbit) on his adventures with his friends, cousin Benjamin Bunny, along with the new character of Lily Bobtail, in the Lake District of northern England.

== Characters ==
=== Main ===
- Peter Rabbit (voiced by Colin DePaula and L. Parker Lucas in the US version, and Charlie George and Harry Henty in the UK version) – The main protagonist of the series. A mischievous, curious, quick-witted, street smart, charming, imaginative and adventurous young rabbit. He is also the eldest of his siblings. Unlike the character from the books, this version of Peter Rabbit lacks shoes. He also can be very hot-headed. Peter's catchphrases are "a good rabbit never gives up!", and "let's hop to it!" He also speaks a British accent.
- Benjamin Bunny (voiced by Peter Steve Harris in the US version and Jay Ruckley in the UK version) – Peter's cousin who joins him on his adventures. Unlike the character from the books, Benjamin is shorter and younger than Peter in this adaptation. He is portrayed as being cowardly, wimpy, clumsy, hungry and clueless but also good-natured, loyal, and kind. Benjamin's catchphrase is "rabbits are brave, rabbits are brave...", which he says when he is scared.
- Lily Bobtail (voiced by Michaela Dean in the US version and Grace Lissenden and Imogen Bailey in the UK version) – Peter and Benjamin's quick-witted female best friend, who carries many useful objects in her pocket. Unlike Peter and Benjamin, who were based on the books by Beatrix Potter, Lily is a new character who was created by the production team for the series. She carries many objects in a pocket on her dress. Lily's catchphrases are "I know that for a fact!", and "just in case pocket, just in case!"

=== Recurring ===
- Mr. Tod – The main antagonist of the series. A red fox who consistently fails to hunt down, capture, and devour the protagonists and other supporting characters.
- Squirrel Nutkin – A short-tailed squirrel and the leader of the squirrels' tribe. He is Peter's friend, who saves Peter whenever he gets captured by Mr. Tod. His tail was cut off by Old Brown.
- Felix – Squirrel Nutkin's right-hand man.
- Josephine Rabbit – The widow of Mr. Rabbit, mother of Peter, Cotton-tail, Flopsy and Mopsy, aunt of Benjamin, and sister of Mr. Bouncer.
- Flopsy, Mopsy and Cotton-Tail – Flopsy and Mopsy are Peter's older, ignorant, arrogant, bossy and smug twin sisters. Cotton-Tail is his sweet baby sister.
- Mr. Bouncer – Benjamin's single father. He is the uncle of Peter, Cotton-tail, Flopsy and Mopsy, the brother of Josephine, and brother-in-law of Mr. Rabbit. He likes to invent many things, which often go wrong.
- Jeremy Fisher – A frog that Peter, Benjamin and Lily accidentally cause trouble for on occasion. He enjoys fishing and was friends with Peter's father. He has a passion for music, but cannot really sing.
- Jemima Puddle-Duck – A kind yet very simple-minded duck that knows Peter and his friends well. She has three ducklings.
- Mrs. Tiggy-Winkle – A hedgehog, washerwoman and one of the many townspeople Peter interacts with. She speaks with an Irish accent.
- Ginger and Pickles – A cat and dog who run the village shop. Pickles is quite gruff while Ginger is more respectful of their customers.
- Mr. McGregor – A human farmer whose vegetables are the target of Peter. His face is kept hidden. He is portrayed as an old man who gets winded often. He speaks with a Scottish accent.
- Tommy Brock – An irritable badger that finds Peter and his friends obnoxious when they wake him up or disturb his possessions, but sometimes he gets along with them and even saves them from Mr. Tod. He enjoys eating worms.
- Old Brown – A short-tempered owl that wants nothing but silence, thus he attacks anyone who makes a sound within his vicinity. He constantly chases after Nutkin for disrupting the peace.
- Samuel Whiskers – A rat whose full name is Samuel Jeremiah Bartholomew Edmond Cornelius Whiskers. He is always after an easy meal, preferably cakes and baked sweets, and often attempts to steal food from the other characters.
- Dr. Warren Bobtail – Lily's father and the Rabbits' family doctor. He has a strong sense of smell.
- Mrs. Bobtail – Warren's wife and Lily's mother.
- Pig Robinson – A friendly pig that lives on a farm with his best friend Mittens. He loves to paint on his easel and tries to befriend everyone he meets.
- Mittens – A young cat that lives on a farm with her best friend Pig Robinson. While somewhat hostile to Peter, Benjamin and Lily at first, she eventually warms up to them. She is aggressive towards any rodents, and loathes the idea of Tommy Brock moving in her farm.
- Mr. Tolly – A tortoise, that, over his many years, has acquainted with many of Peter Rabbit's friends, enemies, as well as Peter's father with whom he went on many adventures with alongside Jeremy Fisher and Mr Bouncer.
- Jack Sharp – A three-spined stickleback that once knew Mr. Rabbit. Often fights with Jeremy Fisher.
- The Shrew – A shrew whose territory possesses a bountiful field of dandelions, which he guards against Peter Rabbit, or any other animal. He is the object of Cotton-tail's affection, much to his dismay.
- The Tittlemouse siblings – Albert, Louisa and Stanley are mice siblings that are always trying to survive.

Fifty six episodes of the series have been aired as of 2016. Except "Peter Rabbit's Christmas Tale", all episode titles begin with "The Tale of". The American dub did not follow this titling method in season 2.

== Voice cast ==
=== UK version ===
- Charlie George (Season 1) and Harry Henty (Season 2) as Peter Rabbit
- Grace Lissenden (Season 1) and Imogen Bailey (Season 2) as Lily Bobtail
- Jay Ruckley as Benjamin Bunny
- Nigel Pilkington as Squirrel Nutkin and Squirrels
- Mark A. Huckerby as Mr. Tod
- JB Blanc as Tommy Brock
- Dave B. Mitchell as Mr. McGregor
- Joshua Colley as Pig Robinson
- Gwenfair Vaughan as Mrs. Tiggy-Winkle
- Justin P.G. Trefgarne as The Shrew, Dr. Warren Bobtail, Felix (Season 2), Albert Mouse (Season 2) and Stanley Mouse (Season 2)
- Roger May as Mr. Bouncer
- Gemma Harvey as Jemima Puddle-Duck
- Gina Mellotte as Mrs. Bobtail, Mrs. Rabbit (Season 2), Flopsy (Season 2) and Mopsy (Season 2)
- Emma Weaver as Cottontail (Season 2) and Louisa Mouse (Season 2)
- Joanna Ruiz as Mrs. Rabbit, Flopsy, Mopsy and Cotton Tail (Season 1)
- Dan Chambers as Jeremy Fisher, Ginger and Pickles, Mr. Tolly (Season 2) and Jack Sharp (Season 2)
- Laurence Kennedy as Sammy Whiskers and Old Brown
- Sophia Waterton as Mittens (Season 2)
- Danny Price
- John White

=== US version ===
- Colin DePaula as Peter Rabbit (Season 1)
- L. Parker Lucas as Peter Rabbit (Season 2)
- Peter Steve Harris as Benjamin Bunny
- Michaela Dean as Lily Bobtail
- Kyle Dean Massey as Squirrel Nutkin
- Stephanie Sheh as Josephine Rabbit (Season 1)
- Megan Taylor Harvey as Flopsy, Mopsy (Season 1)
- Brittany Harms as Flopsy (Season 2)
- Sawyer Niehaus as Mittens and Mopsy (Season 2)
- Jenna Iacono (Season 1) and Aviella Kibel (Season 2) as Cottontail Rabbit
- JB Blanc (54 episodes, 2012–2016) as Tommy Brock, Mr. Bouncer, Ginger and Jack Sharp
- Mark A. Huckerby as Mr. Tod
- Dave B. Mitchell as Mr. McGregor and Old Brown
- Gwenfair Vaughan as Mrs. Tiggy-Winkle
- Sarah Bolt as Jemima Puddle-Duck and Mrs. Bobtail (Season 1)
- Katie Koslowski as Josephine Rabbit (Season 2) and Mrs. Bobtail (Season 2)
- Kirk Thornton as Jeremy Fisher and Pickles
- Shawn Curran as Sammy Whiskers and Dr. Warren Bobtail
- Spike Spencer as The Shrew and Felix
- Joshua Colley as Pig Robinson
- David McCamley (23 episodes, 2014–2015)
- Dino Athanassiou (23 episodes, 2014–2015)
- Cole Meyer Carandang (23 episodes, 2014–2015)
- Jennifer Fox (1 episode, 2015)

== Episodes ==
=== Series overview ===
Series	Episodes	Originally released	
Series	Episodes	First released	Last released
1	28	14 December 2012	7 October 2014
2	28	8 October 2014	6 May 2016

=== Season 1 (2012–14) ===
No. overall	No. in season	Title	Original release date
1	1	"Peter Rabbit's Christmas Tale"	14 December 2012
Peter and Benjamin need to deliver the holiday supplies when Mr. Bouncer falls ill. As they brave a blizzard, the pair manage to make a new friend along the way.
2	2	"The Tale of the Radish Robber" "The Tale of Two Enemies"	19 February 2013
Peter and his friends search for a place to eat their radishes; Peter tries to set Mr. Tod and Tommy Brock against each other.
3	3	"The Tale of the Greedy Fox" "The Tale of the Secret Treehouse"	21 February 2013
Peter tells a lie that leads Jemima Puddle-Duck into the hands of Mr. Tod; Peter competes for his own treetop hideout.
4	4	"The Tale of Benjamin's Strawberry Raid" "The Tale of the Lying Fox"	21 February 2013
Benjamin takes charge of the strawberry harvest raid on Mr. McGregor's garden; Peter agrees to help Mr. Tod when he gets trapped.
5	5	"The Tale of the Angry Cat" "The Tale of Mr. Tod's Trap"	25 February 2013
Peter accidentally brings Mr McGregor's cat back to his own home; Lily becomes stuck in Mr. Tod's trap after being lured by radishes. NOTE: The episode is set during winter.
6	6	"The Tale of Nutkin on the Run" "The Tale of the Wriggly Worms"	27 February 2013
Nutkin takes Old Brown's glasses and makes him angry; Peter makes a promise to appease Tommy Brock.
7	7	"The Tale of Jemima's Egg" "The Tale of the Great Breakout"	4 March 2013
Peter is asked to keep an eye on Jemima's egg; Mr. McGregor captures the entire squirrel tribe in his garden.
8	8	"The Tale of the Lucky Four Leaf Clover" "The Tale of the Unguarded Garden"	6 March 2013
Benjamin finds a lucky four leaf clover; Peter makes plans to raid the garden while Mr. McGregor is away.
9	9	"The Tale of the Start of Spring" "The Tale of the Mother's Day Pie"	29 March 2013
When Jemima's new egg goes missing, only Peter Rabbit is able to put together the clues and find the culprit; Peter forgets to get his mother a gift for Mother's Day.
10	10	"The Tale of the Mystery Plum Thief" "The Tale of the Grumpy Owl"	15 April 2013
Peter tries to get the last plum from Mr. McGregor's tree; Old Brown takes Peter's journal.
11	11	"The Tale of the Big Move" "The Tale of the Lost Tunnels"	17 April 2013
Lily's father decides to move his family out of the Lake District; Benjamin gets lost in a network of underground tunnels.
12	12	"The Tale of the Downhill Escape" "The Tale of the Cat and the Rat"	6 May 2013
Peter takes Benjamin and Lily on a ride down a steep slope; Peter enlists the help of Mr. McGregor's cat when Jemima and the ducklings are driven from their coop.
13	13	"The Tale of the Dash in the Dark" "The Tale of the Hazelnut Raid"	8 May 2013
Peter and his friends go into the woods at night to catch a jar full of glowworms for Cotton-Tail; Peter accidentally destroys the Squirrels' store of nuts.
14	14	"The Tale of the Broken Bed" "The Tale of the One That Got Away"	28 May 2013
Peter breaks the bed that his father made for him; Peter and his friends attempt to catch a large trout.
15	15	"The Tale of the Runaway Kites" "The Tale of the Hero Rabbit"	30 May 2013
Peter and Lily must work together to rescue Benjamin; A group of mice mistake Benjamin for a hero and enlist him to retrieve their stolen peas.
16	16	"The Tale of the Falling Rock" "The Tale of Cotton-Tail's New Friend"	23 September 2013
Peter and his friends must save Mrs. Tiggy-Winkle from a landslide; Cotton-Tail leaves the burrow in search of her new playmate.
17	17	"The Tale of Benjamin's New Map" "The Tale of the Surprising Sisters"	25 September 2013
After Benjamin gets lost in the woods, Peter and Lily give him a map; Flopsy and Mopsy insist on accompanying Peter on his adventure to find gooseberries.
18	18	"The Tale of the Wrecked Treehouse" "The Tale of the Stolen Firewood"	25 October 2013
The rabbits must piece their tree house back together after it is destroyed by a storm; Peter, Lily and Benjamin go out to collect firewood.
19	19	"The Tale of Cotton-Tail's Cake" "The Tale of the Terrible Trap"	18 November 2013
Cotton-tail's birthday cake is stolen; the predators create a plan to get rid of Peter.
20	20	"The Tale of the Flying Fox" "The Tale of the True Friends"	20 November 2013
Peter finds a mysterious key hidden in his father's journal; When Benjamin is impressed by Lily's cleverness, Peter mistakenly thinks they no longer need him in the gang, but when Lily and Benjamin get trapped in Mr McGregor's Garden, Peter soon realizes that his friends need him more than ever!
21	21	"The Tale of the Giant Pumpkin" "The Tale of the Peek-A-Boo Rabbits"	31 January 2014
Peter sets his sights on the biggest pumpkin in Mr. McGregor's patch; Benjamin and Cotton-tail get lost in the Shadowy Woods during a game of peek-a-boo.
22	22	"The Tale of the Great Rabbit and Squirrel Adventure" "The Tale of Old Brown's Feather"	15 February 2014
Peter tells Cotton-tail how he and Nutkin became friends and how the squirrel lost his tail.
23	23	"The Tale of Jeremy Fisher's Musical Adventure" "The Tale of the Lost Ladybird"	31 March 2014
Jeremy Fisher gets into trouble while composing a new piece; Peter accidentally loses Lily's pet ladybug. Note: the first segment has also been called "The Tale of Benjamin's Map" and numbered 0
24	24	"The Tale of Old Rusty" "The Tale of the Squeaky Toy"	2 April 2014
Peter and his friends travel to Rocky Island to find Old Rusty; Peter loses Cotton-tail's squeaky rabbit toy.
25	25	"The Tale of the Flying Rabbits" "The Tale of the Puddleduck Disaster"	3 April 2014
Peter hopes to find a flying machine that his father crashed into Mr. McGregor's garden; When Jemima is short on fruity flapjack ingredients for her hungry ducklings, she misunderstands Peter's advice and heads to Mr. McGregor's garden.
26	26	"The Tale of Jeremy Fisher's Recital" "The Tale of the Squirrel Hotpot"	14 April 2014
Sammy Whiskers and Mr. Tod crash Jeremy Fisher's annual gathering; When Mr. Tod catches Nutkin and takes him to Owl Island to get a squirrel recipe from Old Brown.
27	27	"The Tale of the Fierce Bad Rabbit" "The Tale of the Runaway Rabbits"	29 May 2014
Peter and his friends set out to taste the sweetest dandelions in the world; Peter brings his sleeping sister to an event at the squirrel camp.
28	28	"The Tale of the Uninvited Badger" "The Tale of the Brewing Storm"	7 October 2014
Tommy Brock takes up residence in Bouncer's burrow to escape the cold; Peter, Lily and Benjamin must rescue Cotton-tail's blanket, escape Mr. Tod and return home before a storm breaks.

=== Season 2 (2014–16) ===
No. overall	No. in season	Title	Original release date
29	1	"The Tale of The Tunnel Rumbler" "The Tale of The Frightened Fox"	8 October 2014
Peter and friends mistakes Jeremy Fisher as a monster; Peter gets trapped in Mr Tod's lair, so he scares him.
30	2	"The Tale of The Great Owl Adventure"	9 October 2014
After being scared of the Scare Owl and Squirrels waking him up, Old Brown ends up moving.
31	3	"The Tale of The Scare Owl" "The Tale of The Old Brown's New Roost"	10 October 2014
Peter and friends use the Scare Owl to scare Old Brown, but ends up scaring the squirrels; Old Brown decides to move away from Nutkin and the squirrels.
32	4	"The Tale of The Best Bowler" "The Tale of The Great Potato Plunder"	8 December 2014
Peter and Nutkin compete for best bowler, but gets into trouble with Mr Tod; Peter wants to get most of Mr McGregor's Potatoes
33	5	"The Tale of Cotton-tail's Treetop Tumble" "The Tale of the Perilous Party"	10 December 2014
Cottontail gets in trouble with Old Brown and Mr Tod; Mr Tod tricks everyone
34	6	"The Tale of the High-Flying Badger" "The Tale of Benjamin's Blunder"	12 December 2014
Tommy Brock sleeps on the squirrel cabin; Benjamin goes missing
35	7	"The Tale of The Tiny Terror" "The Tale of the Treehouse Rescue"	15 December 2014
the Shrew breaks into Mr McGregor's Garden; Peter is forced to show his sisters the secret hideout
36	8	"The Tale of The Lost Journal" "The Tale of The Seed Snatch" "The Tale of The Need for Seed"	21 March 2015
Mr Tod steals Peter's journal; Nutkin gets obessed with seeds
37	9	"The Tale of the Heroic Hedgehog" "The Tale of The Bird Trap"	28 March 2015
Mrs Tiggy Winkle becomes a hero; Mr Tod traps birds
38	10	"The Tale of Dr. Bobtail's Adventure" "The Tale of the Locked Cage"	28 March 2015
Dr Bobtail helps Nutkin; Mr McGregor traps Peter and Sammy
39	11	"The Tale of the Missing Ducklings" "The Tale of the Hungry Thieves"	2 May 2015
40	12	"The Tale of Nutkin's Rabbity Day" "The Tale of the Unexpected Hero"	2 May 2015
41	13	"The Tale of the Amazing Mom" "The Tale of Mom's Precious Things"	9 May 2015
42	14	"The Tale of The Racing Rabbit" "The Tale of Fred Snail"	9 May 2015
43	15	"The Tale of The Saving of the Shrew" "The Tale of Fish Out of Water"	16 May 2015
44	16	"The Tale of The Kitten and Pig Adventure"	16 May 2015
45	17	"The Tale of Cotton-tail's Party" "The Tale of The Thing-A-Ma-Jig"	23 May 2015
46	18	"The Tale of The Big Bad Badger" "The Tale of The Big Badger Blunder" "The Tale of the Squabbling Squirrels"	23 May 2015
47	19	"The Tale of Peter's Great Escape" "The Tale of The Great Cake Chase"	30 May 2015
48	20	"The Tale of the Go-Kart Getaway" "The Tale of The New Hideout"	30 May 2015
49	21	"The Tale of The Christmas Star" "The Tale of the Sleepy Hedgehog"	17 December 2015
50	22	"The Tale of the Spectacular Sled" "The Tale of Cotton-tail's Tooth"	16 February 2016
51	23	"The Tale of Tricky Tortoise" "The Tale of Mice on the Move"	18 February 2016
52	24	"The Tale of The Unexpected Discovery"	21 March 2016
53	25	"The Tale of Mittens' New Friend" "The Tale of the Flooded Burrow"	23 March 2016
54	26	"The Tale of Spilled Milk" "The Tale of The First Bluebell"	2 May 2016
55	27	"The Tale of The Great Tortoise Rescue" "The Tale of the King of the Woods"	4 May 2016
56	28	"The Tale of Musical Mayhem" "The Tale of the Missing Journal"	6 May 2016

== Broadcast ==
Peter Rabbit airs in Canada on Treehouse TV. In the United Kingdom, it airs on CBeebies and streaming services Netflix and Amazon Prime Video.

Distribution rights were held globally by Silvergate Media, except in North America and India, where Nickelodeon/Viacom Media Networks secured them under license. The series was available for streaming on Paramount+ until being removed in June 2023.

== Home media ==
=== North America ===
Home media releases in North America were handled by Paramount Home Entertainment.

- Peter Rabbit (28 May 2013)
- Christmas Tale (12 November 2013)
- Spring Into Adventure (18 February 2014)
- Peter Rabbit: Season One was released on 9 October 2015, exclusively at Amazon.com. This release contains 4 discs. It is published on demand onto DVD-Rs.

== Reception ==
The series was met with mostly positive reviews. "Peter Rabbit's Christmas Tale" (14 December, at 7 p.m. ET/PT), drew 3 million total viewers and ranked as the number-one program with K2-5 and K2-11 across all TV in its time period. It was also the top-rated and most-watched preschool telecast for the week, posting double and triple-digit gains over last year with K2-5 (6.7/891,000, +196%) and K2-11 (4.7/1.6 million, +22%); and A18-49 (.9/940,000, +73%), making it the week's top preschool telecast.

According to 'By The Numbers', Nickelodeon's brand-new animated series Peter Rabbit rose to the top of the charts, with its Tuesday, 19 February premiere, which delivered 1.7 million total viewers. The new CG-animated series was also basic cable's top telecast in its time period (12-12:30 p.m. ET/PT) with K2-5, A18-49, W18-49 and total viewers, posting double-digit gains for the net with K2-5 (5.7/760,000, +21%), A18-49 (+47%), W18-49 (+43%) and total viewers (+31%).

CBeebies broadcasts of the programme have been equally successful with the broadcast on Christmas morning 2012 on BBC1 earning it the highest ratings on any channel in that timeslot.

At the 2014 Emmy Awards, the programme earned three daytime Emmys and scored another five nominations, earning the most nominations for an animated programme that year.
