= Tabitha Twitchit =

Mrs. Tabitha Twitchit
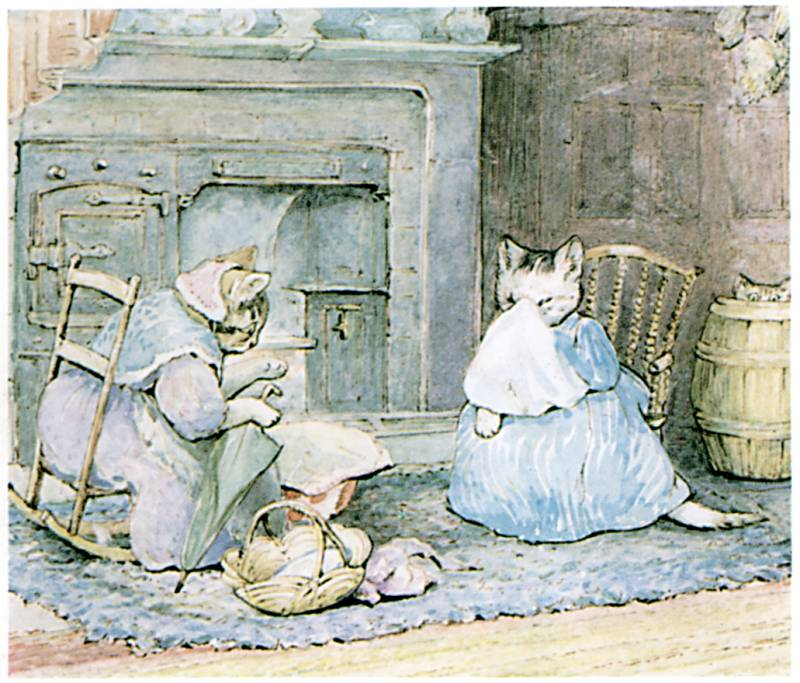
- Tabitha Twitchit (centre) sobs out her problems to her cousin Ribby (left) while daughter Moppet takes a peek from hiding in the flour barrel (right) — a scene from The Tale of Samuel Whiskers or The Roly-Poly Pudding
- First appearance: The Tale of the Pie and the Patty-Pan
- Last appearance: The Tale of Ginger and Pickles
- Created by: Beatrix Potter

In-universe information
- Species: Cat
- Gender: Female
- Occupation: Shopkeeper
- Children: Moppet (daughter); Mittens (daughter); Thomas/Tom Kitten (son)
- Nationality: English

Mrs. Tabitha Twitchit is a fictional anthropomorphic cat who features in the books of Beatrix Potter. She is a shopkeeper and the long-suffering mother of three unruly kittens, Moppet, Mittens and Tom Kitten.

In the books, she is shown as standing on her hind legs and wearing fashionable clothes. She and her kittens live in a house based on the Hill Top farmhouse while her shop is based on one in Hawkshead, a market town nearby.

== Inspiration ==
The success of her early books enabled Potter to purchase a farm called Hill Top in Lancashire (now Cumbria). Among the animals there was a cat called Tabitha Twitchit.

== Books ==
=== The Tale of the Pie and the Patty-Pan (1905) ===
Tabitha is shown working at her shop and the illustrations include kittens, presumably her own, playing outside. Tabitha is rather peeved when her cousin Ribby tells her that she is having tea with Duchess the dog. "Just as if there were no CATS in Sawrey!" mutters Tabitha. Privately, Ribby considers Duchess superior company to Tabitha — though the two cats do enjoy a good gossip while Ribby is at the shop purchasing goods. However, after a great deal of confusion and chaos as a result of the tea party with Duchess, Ribby decides that in future she will invite Cousin Tabitha Twitchit instead.

=== The Story of Miss Moppet (1906) ===
The Story of Miss Moppet was a fold-up book also written and illustrated by Beatrix Potter, in which the titular kitten has problems with a mouse. In her next book, The Tale of Tom Kitten, published the following year, Moppet was shown to be one of Tabitha Twitchit's children.

=== The Tale of Tom Kitten (1907) ===
The Tale of Tom Kitten showed Tabitha and her kittens, Moppet, Mittens and Tom Kitten, living in Potter's own home at Hill Top. Tabitha has invited some friends for tea (maybe even Ribby) and washes and dresses her children for the occasion. She then unwisely allows them to play outside, but they then lose their clothes to some passing ducks, including Jemima Puddle-Duck. Their angry mother sends them to their room, telling her friends that they are ill, when in fact they are just getting up to further mischief.

Potter concluded The Tale of Tom Kitten with the remark that she might "have to make another, larger, book, to tell you more about Tom Kitten". In fact she had been writing such a book at about the same time and it was published a year later.

=== The Tale of Samuel Whiskers or The Roly-Poly Pudding (1908) ===
This book was The Roly-Poly Pudding (later renamed The Tale of Samuel Whiskers or The Roly-Poly Pudding). Again based at Hill Top, it describes the place as being overrun with rats which are as much a trial for Tabitha (as they were for Potter) as her kittens. Tabitha tries to keep her children under control by locking them into a cupboard (an accepted form of discipline in those days). Tom Kitten evades his mother, only to be captured by the rats Samuel Whiskers and Anna Maria who decide to eat him as a pudding. Ribby, who has come for a visit, helps Tabitha rescue Tom Kitten, who, as a result of his experience, develops a phobia for rats, though his sisters Moppet and Mittens become well-paid rat-catchers. The last illustration to feature Tabitha has her sitting by the fire, happy at the fact that there have not been any rats in her home for some time.

=== The Tale of Ginger and Pickles (1909) ===
Tabitha and her shop are mentioned in The Tale of Ginger and Pickles, though she does not feature in the illustrations. The story establishes Tabitha as a shrewd and astute businesswoman. She does not give her customers credit, while her rival shopkeepers, Ginger the cat and Pickles the dog, grant unlimited credit. This policy encourages their customers to buy large amounts of merchandise without ever paying for any of it, preventing Ginger and Pickles from making any money. When they are served notice that the annual rates and taxes are due, they deem it "the last straw" and close their shop. Tabitha takes advantage to raise her own prices while still withholding credit.

== In other media ==
In 1971, Tabitha Twitchit appeared as a character in the ballet film, The Tales of Beatrix Potter.

In 1992, a number of Beatrix Potter's tales were turned into an animated television series and broadcast by the BBC as The World of Peter Rabbit and Friends. Among the episodes were The Tale of Tom Kitten and The Tale of Samuel Whiskers, or the Roly-Poly Pudding. Tabitha Twitchit and Ribby were voiced by Rosemary Leach and Patricia Routledge respectively.

The "real" Tabitha Twitchit appears in Susan Wittig Albert's Cottage Tales of Beatrix Potter, in which she is the president of Sawrey's Cat Council.

A 1967 single by English pop rock band Dave Clark Five is named after Tabitha Twitchit.
