= Peter Rabbit 2: The Runaway =

2021 film by Will Gluck

- Theatrical release poster with its previous intended release date
- Directed by: Will Gluck
- Written by: Will Gluck; Patrick Burleigh
- Based on: The Tale of Peter Rabbit by Beatrix Potter
- Produced by: Will Gluck; Zareh Nalbandian; Catherine Bishop; Jodi Hildebrand
- Starring: Rose Byrne; Domhnall Gleeson; David Oyelowo; Elizabeth Debicki; Margot Robbie; James Corden
- Cinematography: Peter Menzies Jr.
- Edited by: Matt Villa
- Music by: Dominic Lewis
- Production companies: Columbia Pictures; Animal Logic; MRC; 2.0 Entertainment; Olive Bridge Entertainment
- Distributed by: Sony Pictures Releasing
- Release dates: March 25, 2021 (Australia); May 17, 2021 (United Kingdom); June 10, 2021 (United States)
- Running time: 93 minutes
- Countries: Australia; United Kingdom; United States
- Language: English
- Budget: $45 million
- Box office: $157.2 million

Peter Rabbit 2: The Runaway is a 2021 comedy film directed by Will Gluck, who co-wrote the screenplay with Patrick Burleigh, based on the Peter Rabbit stories by Beatrix Potter. A direct sequel to Peter Rabbit (2018), James Corden reprises his role as the titular character, alongside Rose Byrne, Domhnall Gleeson, and David Oyelowo in live-action roles, and Elizabeth Debicki and Margot Robbie in voice roles.

Unlike its predecessor, Sony Pictures Animation was not involved in the film's production. After facing numerous delays from its original February 2020 release date due to the COVID-19 pandemic, the film was released theatrically by Sony Pictures Releasing in Australia on March 25, 2021, in the United Kingdom on May 17 and in the United States on June 10. The film received mixed reviews from critics and grossed $157 million.

== Plot ==
Thomas McGregor and Bea get married, with their friends, human and animal, attending, while Peter Rabbit accepts having Thomas in his life. A month after their honeymoon, Thomas helps Bea as she works on her children's storybook based on Peter and his friends, but Peter is disappointed that the book portrays him as naughty. After getting a letter from a publishing company wanting to distribute the book, Thomas and Bea take Peter, Benjamin, Flopsy, Mopsy, and Cottontail to meet the publisher, Nigel Basil-Jones, who presents his marketing plan which paints Peter as a troublemaker and shows a billboard design for a potential movie that makes him look villainous.

Dismayed, Peter walks away from the group and goes into town where he meets an older rabbit named Barnabas, who claims to be an old friend of his late father. They are snared by animal catchers, who take them to a pet pound, where they were taken in by a girl named Amelia. Barnabas and Peter raid the family's fridge with the help of Barnabas’ crew, and take the food back to their hideout. Barnabas talks about how his father used to steal for Peter and his sisters to keep their bellies full until Thomas and Bea find Peter and bring him home. The next morning, Peter tells Benjamin about Barnabas and convinces him and his sisters to join him in meeting the crew. Recognising Peter's sisters and Benjamin, Barnabas divulges his big plan to rob from the farmers market, with their big score being packs of dried fruit. The rabbits gather help from their animal friends to pull off their heist.

Thomas and Bea meet with Nigel again to go over the designs for the rabbits, but after already having them dressed up in contemporary clothes, Nigel makes more suggestions for the next book. Thomas starts to realise that Nigel's ideas are not in the best interests of Bea's work. The animals arrive at the market and get away with the dried fruits, but all of Peter's friends, including Benjamin and the sisters, are captured by the animal catchers when they sneak into a petting zoo. Barnabas reveals he was intending to keep the dried fruit for himself, while explaining that, after being rejected by humans in the pound due to his old age, he intentionally met Peter in town after reading about him in his book, never even knowing his father.

Feeling guilty, Peter leaves Barnabas and enlists Thomas to help rescue his friends. After hitting a snag with their truck, they go to Bea for help while she is in a meeting with Nigel who wants to put Peter and his friends in a ludicrous space adventure as well as a dangerously unpredictable rescue mission as a way to end the story. Bea pulls her stories from Nigel's company and helps Thomas and Peter rescue their friends while going on over-the-top missions to find them. Peter and his family then go to Barnabas's hideout where they turn the tables by tying Barnabas and his crew to ropes so that they can get pulled away when the nearby tailor shop owner leaves in his truck, leading them to get taken to the pound. The rabbits return the dried fruit to the market sellers, and rejoin Thomas and Bea as they drive home, with Peter deciding to be more willing to listen to the ones that love him. Some time later, Thomas and Bea became parents to a baby girl and Bea names the new book "Peter Rabbit 2: The Runaway”.

== Cast ==
=== Live-action ===
- Rose Byrne as Bea, the rabbits' owner and wife of Thomas McGregor.
- Domhnall Gleeson as Thomas McGregor, the former villain and husband of Bea.
- David Oyelowo as Nigel Basil-Jones, a silver-tongued executive for the publishing company, who quickly concocts a merchandising and advertisement campaign for the Peter Rabbit stories that make them an overnight hit.

=== Voice ===
- James Corden as Peter Rabbit, Flopsy, Mopsy, and Cottontail's brother and Benjamin's cousin
- Margot Robbie as Flopsy Rabbit / The Narrator
- Elizabeth Debicki as Mopsy Rabbit
- Aimee Horne as Cottontail Rabbit; Horne replaces Daisy Ridley from the first film
- Colin Moody as Benjamin Bunny
- Lennie James as Barnabas
- Damon Herriman as Tom Kitten
- Hayley Atwell as Mittens
- Rupert Degas as Samuel Whiskers / Little Pig Robinson / Trainer Von Stauffenmouse / Kennedy St. Squirrel
- Sia as Mrs. Tiggy-Winkle
- Domhnall Gleeson as Mr. Jeremy Fisher
- Rose Byrne as Jemima Puddle-Duck
- Sam Neill as Tommy Brock
- Ewen Leslie as Pigling Bland
- David Wenham as Johnny Town-Mouse
- Will Reichelt as JW Rooster II
- Christian Gazal as Felix D'eer
- Tim Minchin as Busker K. Bushy, Esq.
- Stewart Alves as Mr. Tod
- Faizan Munawar Varya as Ray Rabbit

== Production ==
In May 2018, it was announced that Sony Pictures had started the development of the sequel to Peter Rabbit. In February 2019, it was announced David Oyelowo had joined the cast of the film, with Rose Byrne and Domnhall Gleeson reprising their roles from the first. Elizabeth Debicki and Margot Robbie were confirmed to reprise their respective roles in October 2019.

Principal photography began in January 2019 in Centennial Parklands, Australia. Filming took place in the Lake District at Ambleside and Haverthwaite, around Hill Street and Richmond Bridge in London, Gloucester Docks, a replica of the House of the Tailor of Gloucester, and in Camden, New South Wales.

== Music ==
The film score was composed by Dominic Lewis. A score album was released through Madison Gate Records on June 18, 2021.

== Release ==
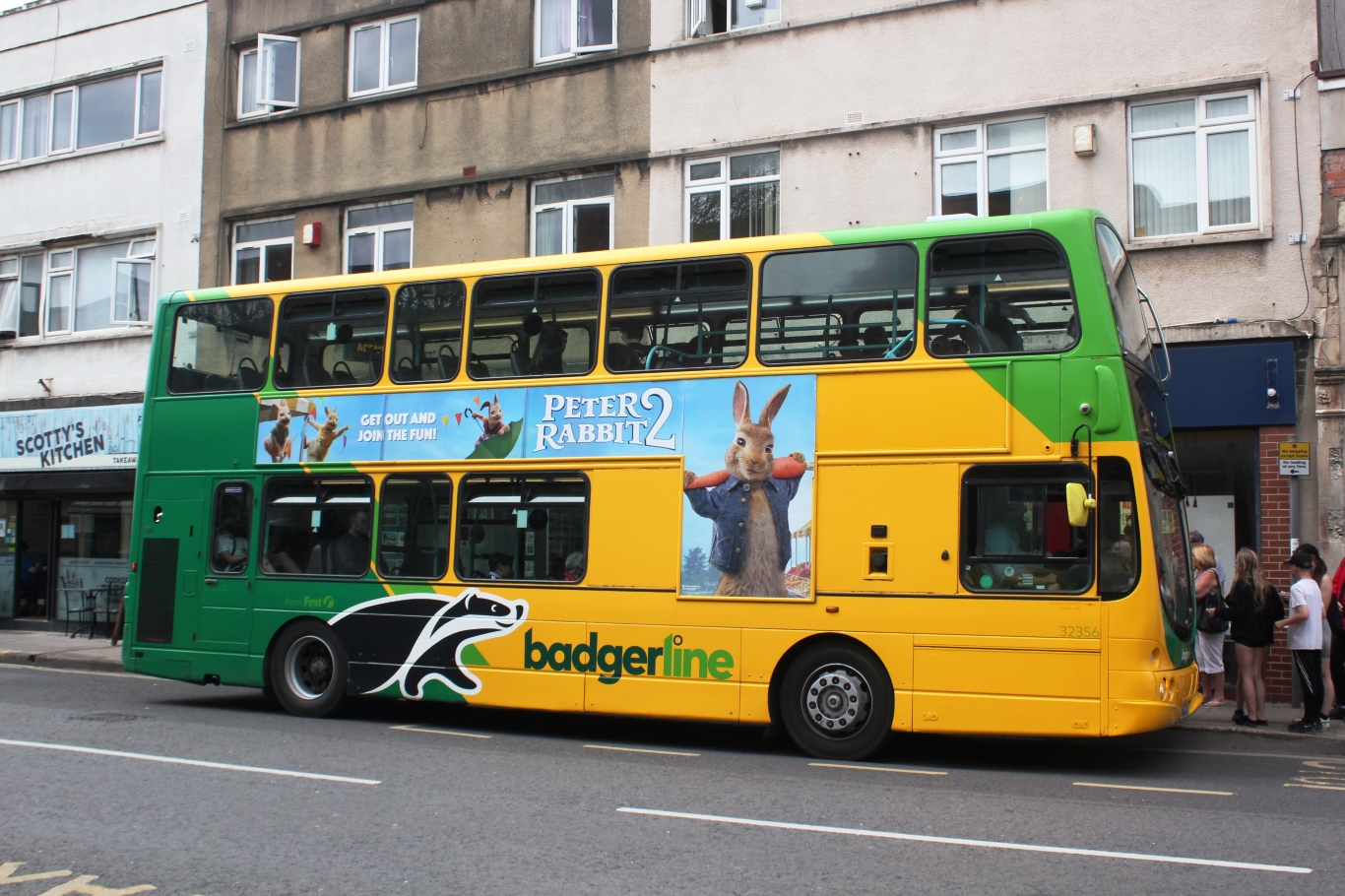
A bus advertising the film in Somerset

Peter Rabbit 2: The Runaway was theatrically released in Australia on March 25, 2021, in the United Kingdom on May 17, and in the United States on June 10.

It was initially set to be released in the United States on February 7, 2020, before being moved back to April 3, 2020, earlier in Australia on March 19, and in the United Kingdom on March 27. The film was delayed again to August 7, 2020, due to the COVID-19 pandemic. It was then further delayed to January 14, 2021, in the United States, then to April 1, and again to June 10. The date was then moved up to May 13 before moving back again to July 1, then moving up once more to June 17, and then once again back to June 10, following the film's box office success outside of the United States.

=== Home media ===
Peter Rabbit 2: The Runaway was released as a purchase on VOD on July 26, 2021, and was released on DVD, Blu-ray and Ultra HD Blu-ray on August 23, 2021, by Sony Pictures Home Entertainment.

== Reception ==
=== Box office ===
Peter Rabbit 2: The Runaway grossed $40.5 million in the United States and Canada, and $116.7 million in other territories, for a worldwide total of $157.2 million.

In the United States and Canada, Peter Rabbit 2 was released alongside In the Heights and The House Next Door: Meet the Blacks 2 and was projected to gross $16–20 million from 3,346 theaters in its opening weekend, with Sony predicting a more modest $8–10 million debut. The film made $4 million on its first day, including $900,000 from Thursday night previews. It went on to debut to $10.1 million, finishing fourth behind A Quiet Place Part II, In the Heights, and The Conjuring: The Devil Made Me Do It. The film fell 39.8% in its second weekend, grossing $6.1 million and finishing in third. In its third weekend, the film fell 21.5% and grossed $4.8 million, finishing in fourth.

In Australia, the film debuted to $2.1 million. By its third weekend in the country (where it made $2.5 million), the film had a running total of $9.2 million. In the UK, the film topped the charts in the first three days of cinemas reopening, making $6.4 million.

=== Critical response ===
On the review aggregator website Rotten Tomatoes, 68% of 75 critics' reviews are positive, with an average rating of 6/10. The website's consensus reads: "An enjoyably silly and self-aware sequel, Peter Rabbit 2: The Runaway should leave fans of the original feeling fairly hoppy." Metacritic, which uses a weighted average, assigned the film a score of 43 out of 100, based on 14 critics, indicating "mixed or average" reviews. Audiences polled by CinemaScore gave the film an average grade of "A−" on an A+ to F scale, while PostTrak reported 74% of audience members gave it a positive score, with 45% saying they would definitely recommend it.

Courtney Howard of Variety called it a "superior sequel" and said the film "serves as both a meta-commentary on his humbling past antics and a pivotal point for the eponymous protagonist." Brian Penn of UK Film Review called it a "great popcorn movie" and said the "voicing actors are undoubtedly the stars even though the humans on screen are perfectly fine."

Ian Freer of Empire rated the film 3 out of 5 stars, writing "It feels a little thin and generic compared to family fare like The Mitchells vs. the Machines, but the Byrne-Gleeson combo is winning and Gluck injects just enough slapstick and smarts to justify the last-gasp gag about a sequel. It's no Paddington 2, but Peter Rabbit 2 works well thanks to a mocking sense of self and a strong second half." However, he noted that "It [Peter Rabbit 2] may not be for the Beatrix Potter purists and has a scattershot quality", but that it "remains enjoyable for its brisk 93 minutes." Peter Bradshaw of The Guardian gave the film 2 out of 5 stars, remarking that "Unlike Paddington, whose literary source material is genuinely funny, this digital Peter Rabbit is never really humorous. It can sometimes be cute or zany and briefly send itself up, but there is fundamentally something pretty straight in its DNA. And so the film rattles inoffensively on, every line and every image seeming as if it has been test marketed in ways advocated by the wicked Nigel Basil-Jones." Christy Lemire of RogerEbert.com gave the film 2 out of 4 stars, who said "By indulging in the exact same instincts it insists are problematic artistically, “Peter Rabbit 2” wants to have its carrot and eat it, too. But maybe that won't bother you. Maybe you'll be grateful for a return to the theater and the opportunity to do so with your kids. In that regard, the sequel hops along in sufficiently bouncy fashion."

=== Accolades ===
At the 11th AACTA Awards, Peter Rabbit 2: The Runaway received nominations for Best Adapted Screenplay, Best Actress, Best Editing, Best Sound, and Best Production Design; and won Best Visual Effects or Animation. The film's visual effects received the Asian Academy Creative Award for Best Visual or Special FX in TV Series or Feature Film at the third ceremony.
