= The Story of Miss Moppet =

Children's book by Beatrix Potter

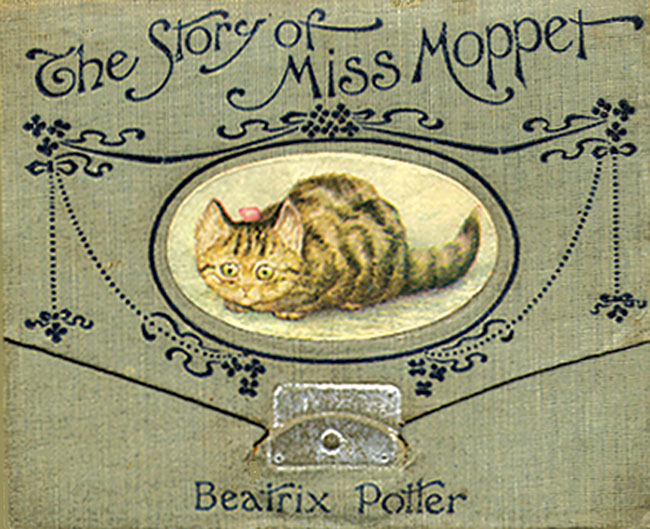
- First edition cover
- Author: Beatrix Potter
- Illustrator: Beatrix Potter
- Language: English
- Genre: Children's literature
- Published: November 1906 (Frederick Warne & Co)
- Publication place: England
- Media type: Print
- Preceded by: The Story of a Fierce Bad Rabbit
- Followed by: The Tale of Tom Kitten
- Text: The Story of Miss Moppet at Wikisource

The Story of Miss Moppet is a story that was written and illustrated by Beatrix Potter, and published by Frederick Warne & Co for the 1906 Christmas season. The story is a tale about teasing, featuring a kitten and a mouse. Between 1902 and 1905, Potter published a series of small-format children's books with Warne. In 1906, she experimented with an atypical panorama design for Miss Moppet, which booksellers disliked; the story was reprinted in 1916 in small book format.

Miss Moppet, the story's eponymous main character, is a kitten teased by a mouse. While pursuing him, she bumps her head on a cupboard. She then wraps a duster about her head, and sits before the fire "looking very ill". The curious mouse creeps closer, is captured, "and because the Mouse has teased Miss Moppet—Miss Moppet thinks she will tease the Mouse; which is not at all nice of Miss Moppet". She ties him up in the duster and tosses him about. However, the mouse makes his escape, and once safely out of reach, dances a jig atop the cupboard.

Although The Story of Miss Moppet is considered one of Potter's lesser efforts critically, it is valued as an introduction to books in general for young children, and to the world of Peter Rabbit. The character of Miss Moppet was released as a porcelain figurine in 1954 and a plush toy in 1973. The book has been published in a Braille version, translated into seven languages, and was released in an electronic format in 2005. First editions in the original format are available through antiquarian booksellers.

== Background ==
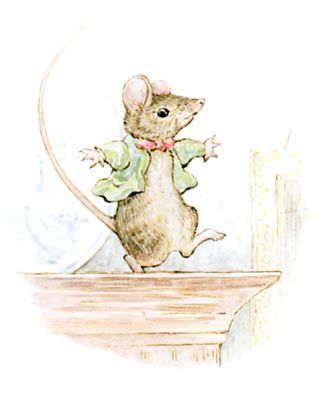
The last illustration shows the mouse dancing a jig.

Helen Beatrix Potter was born on 28 July 1866 to barrister Rupert William Potter and his wife Helen (Leech) Potter in London. She was educated by governesses and tutors, and passed a quiet childhood reading, painting, drawing, tending a nursery menagerie of small animals, and visiting museums and art exhibitions. Her interests in the natural world and country life were nurtured with holidays in Scotland, the Lake District, and Camfield Place, the Hertfordshire home of her paternal grandparents.

Potter's adolescence was as quiet as her childhood. She matured into a spinsterish young woman whose parents groomed her to be a permanent resident and housekeeper in their home. She continued to paint and draw, and experienced her first professional artistic success in 1890 when she sold six illustrations of her pet rabbit to a greeting card publisher. She hoped to lead a useful life independent of her parents, and tentatively considered a career in mycology, but the all-male scientific community regarded her as nothing more than an amateur and she abandoned fungi.

In 1900, Potter revised a tale that she had written for a child in 1893, fashioning it into a dummy book similar to the size and style of Helen Bannerman's The Story of Little Black Sambo. Unable to find a buyer for her book, partially because the children's book market of the time depended on brightly coloured illustrations unlike Potter's line drawings, she decided to publish it privately in December 1901. Frederick Warne & Co had once rejected the tale but, to maintain its position in the small-format children's book market, reconsidered and accepted the "bunny book" (as the firm called it) following the recommendation of their prominent children's book artist L. Leslie Brooke. Potter agreed to colour her pen-and-ink illustrations according to Warne's requirements, and she suggested Warne use the new Hentschel three-colour printing technique in the printing process for The Tale of Peter Rabbit.

Potter continued to publish children's books with Warne, and by 1905 she found herself financially independent. Her books were selling well, and her income, combined with a small inheritance, allowed her to buy Hill Top, a farm of 34 acres (14 ha) at Near Sawrey in the Lake District in July of that year. When her longtime editor and fiancé Norman Warne died a few weeks after their secret engagement, she became depressed, but went on to devote herself to her stories.

== Development and publication ==
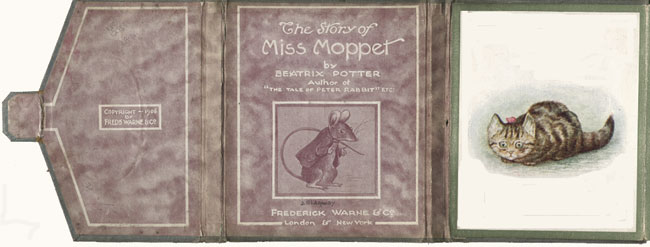
Wallet interior shows (left to right) the flap, title page, and first illustration

In 1906, as Potter was finishing The Tale of Mr. Jeremy Fisher, she considered developing books for a younger audience. Three stories were the result: The Story of Miss Moppet, The Story of a Fierce Bad Rabbit and The Sly Old Cat. Inspired by George Cruikshank's illustrations, she intended to have the stories published in "panoramic format in the style of Cruikshank's Comic Alphabet", as explained by Taylor. The panorama format consisted of "long strips of paper, on which the individual pages of pictures and text were arranged in order from left to right."

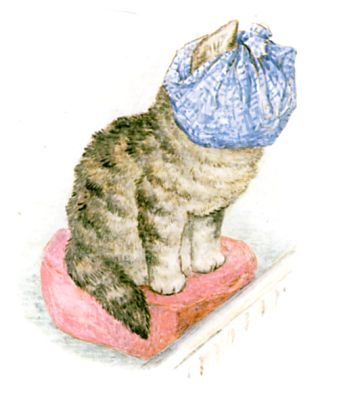
Miss Moppet sits before the fire with her head in a duster.

Potter was at Hill Top in July 1906 during the development of Miss Moppet, and the kitten she borrowed as a model from a mason from Windermere was a difficult subject. "[A]n exasperating model", Potter wrote, "I have borrowed a Kitten and I am rather glad of the opportunity of working at the drawings. It is very young and pretty and a most fearful pickle." Biographer Linda Lear explains that "pickle" was a word Potter used to describe "free-thinking exuberant people, like her cousin Caroline, or mischievous kittens and small children." Potter used the same drawings of the kitten as a model for her next book, The Tale of Tom Kitten, which she dedicated in 1907 "to all Pickles—especially those that get upon my garden wall". Miss Moppet is one of Tom Kitten's sisters, and appears as a character in both books featuring him: The Tale of Tom Kitten and The Tale of Samuel Whiskers or The Roly-Poly Pudding (1908).

Potter was an admirer of American author Joel Chandler Harris and created a series of plates in the 1890s for his Uncle Remus stories, possibly in an attempt to find career direction. So deep was her admiration, Lear speculates the scene of Miss Moppet wrapping her head in the duster comes from a similar scene in an Uncle Remus tale in which Br'er Fox "feigns illness in a rocking chair, wrapped up with flannel". Potter was modeling her sketches from a young kitten and, wanting not to show cruelty, she wrote of the kitten: "She should catch him by the tail / less unpleasant". Children's literature scholar Peter Hunt writes that Potter was careful to protect her young audience from graphic details and she refused to depict death in her stories.

Ten thousand copies of The Story of Miss Moppet were released in a panorama format priced at a shilling in November 1906, and another 10,000 copies in December 1906. There were no subsequent printings in the panorama format. The strip folded accordion-fashion into a grey cloth wallet measuring 108 by 89 millimetres (4.3 in × 3.5 in). When opened, the panorama strip measured 108 by 2,492 millimetres (4.3 in × 98.1 in). As Lear writes, Potter "experimented with a panorama format of fourteen pictures on one long strip of paper which folded into a wallet tied with a ribbon". Lear explains that the format "although popular with readers was ultimately unsuccessful, because shopkeepers found them difficult to keep folded". Potter referred to this fact late in life when she said, "Bad Rabbit and Moppet were originally printed on long strips—The shops sensibly refused to stock them because they got unrolled and so bad to fold up again". MacDonald points out that the fragile panorama format was inappropriate for very young children.

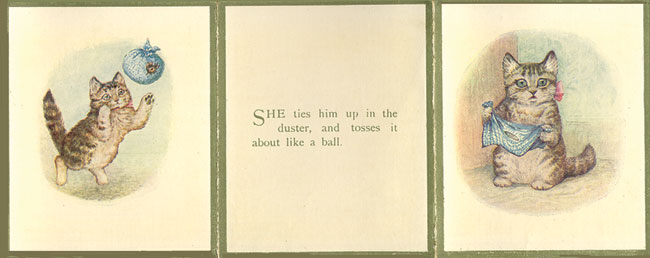
Panorama section of Miss Moppet (left to right): tossing the mouse in the duster, a text page, and discovering the mouse has escaped

Twenty thousand copies of The Story of a Fierce Bad Rabbit were published in panorama format in November and December 1906 in exactly the same measurements as Miss Moppet. Both were later published in a small-book 122 by 103 millimetres (4.8 in × 4.1 in) format. The Sly Old Cat was scheduled for publication in 1907 but fell victim to the pressures exerted by booksellers. It was set aside, but was proposed for publication in 1916 as The Story of the Sly Old Cat. Potter's eyesight was failing and she refused to develop it. The story was published in book format with Potter's 1906 rough sketches for the first time in 1971. It is not included in the standard 23-volume Peter Rabbit library.

By 1916 Frederick Warne & Co had discontinued Miss Moppet in its panorama format, and republished the story in a book format that year. Potter illustrated a frontispiece of the kitten and mouse seated in profile, and a title page vignette of a mouse on all fours facing the reader for the book format. At 113 by 92 millimetres (4.4 by 3.6 in), the book's dimensions were smaller than other Peter Rabbit books. In 1917, she suggested to her publisher that Appley Dapply's Nursery Rhymes be published in the smaller Miss Moppet format.

== Plot ==
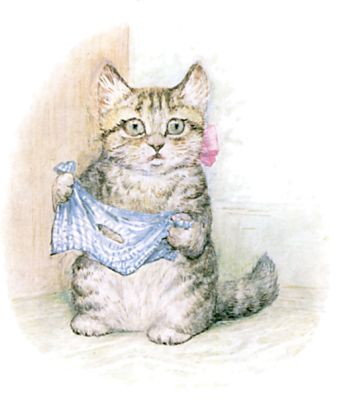
Miss Moppet discovers the mouse has escaped.

The tale opens with an illustration of a wide-eyed kitten: "This is a Pussy called Miss Moppet, she thinks she has heard a mouse!" The following illustration depicts a mouse wearing a pink bow tie and green jacket "peeping out behind the cupboard, and making fun of Miss Moppet. He is not afraid of a kitten." Miss Moppet darts at him, but misses and bumps her head on the cupboard. She hits the cupboard very hard and rubs her nose. The mouse scurries to the top of the cupboard and watches her.

Miss Moppet ties a duster about her head and sits before the fire on a red hassock. The mouse's curiosity is piqued; he thinks she looks very ill, and comes sliding down the bell-pull. "Miss Moppet looks worse and worse." The mouse creeps nearer. Miss Moppet holds her head in her paws and peeks at the mouse through a hole in the duster. "The Mouse comes very close." Miss Moppet jumps and snags him by the tail.

But she forgot about that hole in the duster; and when she untied it – there was no Mouse!

— Beatrix Potter

"And because the Mouse has teased Miss Moppet—Miss Moppet thinks she will tease the Mouse; which is not at all nice of Miss Moppet." The kitten ties the mouse up in the duster then tosses it about like a ball. The mouse peeks from the hole in the duster. In the last illustration but one, Miss Moppet is seated upright on her rump and staring at the reader. The duster lies opened and empty in her paws. "She forgot about that hole in the duster", and the mouse has escaped. He dances a jig safely out of Miss Moppet's reach atop the cupboard.

== Scholarly commentaries ==
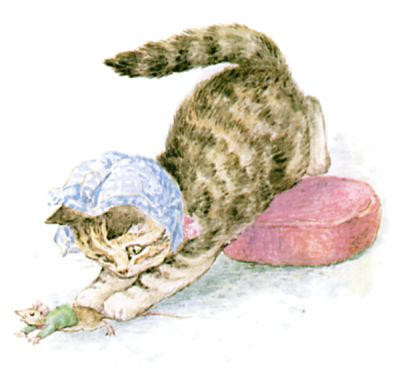
Miss Moppet catches the mouse.

James M. Redfield, a classics professor at the University of Chicago, in his article "An Aristotelian Analysis of Miss Moppet", finds the story follows the tenets of Aristotle's Poetics, with a definite beginning (the unsuccessful attempt to catch the mouse), middle (Miss Moppet pretending to be hurt and catching the mouse), and end (Miss Moppet teasing the mouse and his escape). Redfield notes that Potter makes the outcome of the plot uncertain and creates parity between the characters, which are naturally predator and prey; Potter makes Miss Moppet "young, inexperienced, female, and a pet", while the mouse is "mature, courageous, male, and independent". Redfield praises Potter's skill as an author; she uses the hole in the duster twice—to allow Miss Moppet to catch the mouse, but then for him to escape her—and uses phrases particularly suited for a parent to read aloud to a child ("This is the mouse ..."). Redfield concludes that while teasing is bad in the story—dangerous for the mouse, and cruel for the cat—Potter herself teases the reader in a good way, showing "us that teasing is a kind of loving when it is a kind of teaching. The poet plays with us, and by taking us through an unreal experience, teaches us what it is to live in the real world."

In her essay "Thoroughly Post-Victorian, Pre-Modern Beatrix" professor of English, Katherine Chandler, points out that Potter, unlike most Victorian writers of children's books, wrote original stories based on the realism of animal behaviour. Chandler notes that Potter avoids moralizing in her tales, making Miss Moppet nothing more than a story describing the natural behaviour of kittens. Potter's anthropomorphized animals are in fact slightly naughty, yet in their naughtiness the punishment is never the moral of the tale. At the end of Miss Moppet, the kitten is not punished and the mouse dances on the cupboard. This leads Chandler to quote literary scholar of modernism, Humphrey Carpenter, "there is nothing in [Potter's] work that resembles the moral tale. In fact it might be argued that she is writing something pretty close to a series of immoral tales". In addition Chandler notes that Potter's economic use of prose presages modernism, comparing her writing to that of Ernest Hemingway.

Ruth K. MacDonald, English and children's literature professor at New Mexico State University, agrees, writing in Beatrix Potter that Miss Moppet demonstrates Potter's ability to pare text and illustrations to essentials; noting that she worked best with more complicated plots, more complicated characters, and stories with specific settings rather than generalized backgrounds. Miss Moppet is a vignette, she indicates, rather than the typical Potter tale of causality, extended plot, and variety of character, and depends upon the archetypal animosity between cat and mouse with the cat being the dominant character.

Miss Moppet was more successful than its companion piece The Story of a Fierce Bad Rabbit according to M. Daphne Kutzer, an English professor at the State University of New York at Plattsburgh and author of Beatrix Potter: Writing in Code (2003). Kutzer writes: "the illustrations are more fluid and the storyline more humorous and less moralistic". Potter was never at her best when writing for a clearly defined audience, Kutzer observes, and in writing a Victorian moral tale about teasing, Potter failed to completely engage the reader's imagination in either the story or the illustrations. However, as MacDonald notes, Miss Moppet remains in the Potter canon, and serves as a good initial approach to Potter's literature.

== Merchandise ==
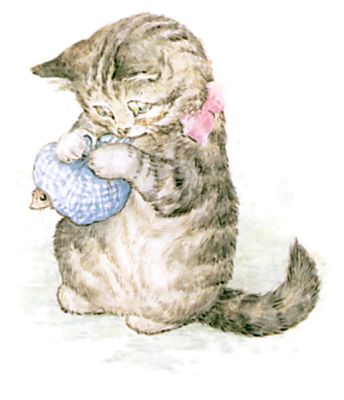
Beswick Pottery made a porcelain figurine of Miss Moppet tying the mouse in the duster.

Potter asserted her tales would one day be nursery classics, and part of the "longevity of her books comes from strategy", writes Potter biographer Ruth MacDonald. She was the first to exploit the commercial possibilities of her characters and tales; between 1903 and 1905 these included a Peter Rabbit stuffed toy, an unpublished board game, and nursery wallpaper. Similar "side-shows" (as she termed the ancillary merchandise) were produced throughout her life. For a number of years Potter designed Christmas cards with characters from her books that were sold to raise money for charities.

Potter died on 22 December 1943, and left her home and the original illustrations for almost all of her books, including Miss Moppet, to the National Trust. Hilltop was opened to visitors in 1946, and displayed her original artwork there until 1985. After Potter's death, Frederick Warne & Co granted licences to various firms for the production of merchandise based on her characters. Beswick Pottery of Longton, Staffordshire released a porcelain figurine of Miss Moppet in 1954; the firm was eventually acquired by Royal Doulton which continued to issue the figurine under the "Royal Albert" brand until it was discontinued in 2002. From 1980 to 1995, when it went out of business, Schmid & Co. of Toronto and Randolph, Massachusetts produced a Miss Moppet music box figurine. From 1983 to 1991, Schmid distributed two Miss Moppet Christmas ornaments (3 and 1.5 inches (76 and 38 mm) tall), made by the Italian firm ANRI. Stuffed toy manufacturers requested licensing for Potter's figures early in the 20th century; however she refused to grant permission, having been disappointed with the quality of the proposed stuffed toys. Frederick Warne & Co retained rights to all Potter merchandise and in 1973 granted a licence to the Eden Toys company of Jersey City, New Jersey to manufacture stuffed animals based on Potter's characters. Beginning in 1975 these included a plush Miss Moppet, which was discontinued in 2001 when Eden Toys went out of business.

== Reprints and translations ==
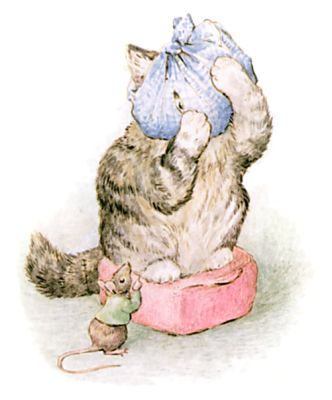
The 1918 hardcover edition cover had an onlay of this image of Miss Moppet peeking through a hole in the duster.

As of 2010, all 23 of Potter's small-format books, including Miss Moppet, remain in print, and are available as a complete set in a presentation box. A 400-page omnibus edition is also available, as is an electronic format, released in 2005. First edition and early edition Potter books are offered by antiquarian booksellers.

Although sold to Penguin Books in 1984, Frederick Warne & Co remains a subsidiary company and continues to publish Potter's books. A 2002 Publishers Weekly article, written for the centennial of the publication of The Tale of Peter Rabbit, reported that Potter was considered one of the most popular classic writers, that anniversary editions of her work were published in 1993 and 2002, and the artwork has been "re-scanned to make the illustrations look fresher and brighter". The Frederick Warne name still appears on editions of Potter's books in English.

Languages into which Miss Moppet has been translated include Chinese, French, German, Italian, Japanese, Spanish and Vietnamese; a Braille edition in English has also been prepared. Miss Moppet was parodied by Nicholas Garland in a political cartoon in the 11 June 1976 issue of the New Statesman. Margaret Thatcher had lost a motion of no confidence in the government of Prime Minister James Callaghan, and Garland's cartoon copied the text and parodied four panels of the story, with Callaghan as the mouse who escapes Thatcher the kitten. In 1986, MacDonald observed that Potter's books had become a "traditional part of childhood in most only English-speaking countries and in many of the countries into whose languages Potter's books have been translated".
