= The World of Peter Rabbit and Friends =

1992 British TV series

- Genre: Animation
- Written by: Beatrix Potter; Dianne Jackson (series writer)
- Directed by: Dennis Abey (live action); Dianne Jackson (series director)
- Narrated by: Niamh Cusack
- Ending theme: "Perfect Day" by Miriam Stockley
- Composer: Colin Towns
- Country of origin: United Kingdom
- Original language: English
- No. of episodes: 9

Production
- Executive producer: Jonathan Peel
- Producers: John Coates (series producer); Dennis Abey (live action); Giles Johnson (live action); Ginger Gibbons; Catrin Unwin; Nick Comley
- Editors: William Taylor Grant (live action); Andy Kemp; Corinne Lejeune; William Taylor Grant; Tony Fish; Peter Hearn; Mark Edwards; Jamie Martin
- Running time: 24 minutes
- Production companies: TVC London; Frederick Warne & Co.; Pony Canyon; Fuji Television Network

Original release
- Network: BBC1 (1992–96); BBC Two (1998)
- Release: 20 December 1992 – 25 December 1998

The World of Peter Rabbit and Friends is a British animated anthology television series based on the works of Beatrix Potter, featuring Peter Rabbit and other anthropomorphic animal characters created by Potter. Fourteen of Potter's stories were adapted into nine films, and the series was originally shown in the U.K. on BBC between 20 December 1992 and 25 December 1998. It was subsequently broadcast in the U.S. on Family Channel between 13 May 1992 and 26 June 1995. For the initial VHS releases, some of the characters' voices were dubbed-over by actors with more American-like accents.

== Production ==
TVC London, in association with the BBC and the Japanese companies Pony Canyon Inc. and Fuji Television Network, Inc., produced the show for the publishing company Frederick Warne & Co. The first six episodes cost approximately £5 million to produce. Dianne Jackson, director of the 1982 Christmas special The Snowman, was involved in the planning of the series and received series director and writer credit on the first six episodes, but she died of cancer on New Year's Eve 1992. The animation style of The World of Peter Rabbit and Friends keeps very close to Potter's artwork in the original books. The main title song for the show is Perfect Day sung by Miriam Stockley. The live-action scenes in Potter's cottage and grounds were filmed on location at her actual cottage, 'Hill Top', in Cumbria, which is maintained unchanged as a museum by the National Trust.

== Contents ==
Each episode opens up with a live-action Beatrix Potter, portrayed by actress Niamh Cusack, coming to her farmhouse out of the rain, either after finishing a watercolour painting and running home with her pet dog, Kep, or after doing the shopping in town and hitching a ride home on a horse-drawn vehicle, sitting down to some tea with her pet rabbit, Peter, and then setting up the featured story. Once Potter finishes the story, she either posts the picture letter herself or asks a boy to do it. An exception to this is The Tailor of Gloucester episode, which takes place at Christmas time. The Tailor of Gloucester, unlike the other episodes, begins with Potter's maid, Daisy, serving out mince pies to some carol singers who sing the Sussex Carol while Potter and her pet cat, Simpkin, listen to them, and it ends with pictures taken from the main story. Some of the episodes include storylines from two separate books, either told one after the other or intermingled.

== Episodes ==
No.	Title	Directed by	Original release date
1	"The Tale of Peter Rabbit and Benjamin Bunny"	Geoff Dunbar	20 December 1992
Peter Rabbit goes into Mr. McGregor's garden against his mother's warning. He loses his clothes after an eventful escape, and Mr. McGregor puts them on his scarecrow. The next morning, Peter and his cousin Benjamin Bunny go into Mr. McGregor's garden to rescue the clothes, and get Mrs. Rabbit a present of onions. They find a cat and hide in a basket which the cat sits upon. Mrs. Rabbit is sad that Peter hasn't returned, and Benjamin's father notes that Benjamin has also gone missing. He goes into Mr. McGregor's garden where he fights the cat off the basket and locks her in the garden shed. Then he sends Peter back home.
2	"The Tale of Tom Kitten and Jemima Puddle-Duck"	Dave Unwin	9 April 1993
Tom Kitten and his sisters are all dressed up for their mother's tea party. They lose their clothes while playing and Mrs. Tabitha Twitchit is mad at them for doing so. When her guests arrive, she tells them her kittens are in bed with measles. Meanwhile, Jemima Puddle Duck is trying to lay her eggs and comes across a foxy whiskered gentleman.
3	"The Tale of Samuel Whiskers or The Roly-Poly Pudding"	Mike Stuart	29 August 1993
On baking day, Mrs. Tabitha Twitchit locks her kittens up in a cupboard. But Tom Kitten tries to hide, and goes up the chimney. Tabitha's cousin Ribby comes over to borrow some yeast, and Tabitha tells her that she can't find Tom. They search for him all over the house. Meanwhile, Tom Kitten comes face to face with Samuel Whiskers, an old rat, and his wife Anna Maria who then hold him prisoner in an attempt to make him into a roly-poly pudding.
4	"The Tailor of Gloucester"	Jack Stokes and Roger Mainwood (animation director)	24 December 1993
A tailor is making a coat for the Mayor of Gloucester. He is nearly finished except for some cherry coloured silk. Some mice finish the coat in the night.
5	"The Tale of Mrs. Tiggy-Winkle and Mr. Jeremy Fisher"	Geoff Dunbar	1 April 1994
Lucie has lost another pocket handkerchief. She tries to find them, and then comes across a tiny bucket in a waterfall. She meets Mrs. Tiggy Winkle, a hedgehog who does laundry. She has her pocket handkerchiefs. Then Lucie and Mrs. Tiggy Winkle deliver the laundry. They meet Mr. Jeremy Fisher, a frog who has had quite an adventure. He was fishing one day, when he nearly got swallowed by a big fish.
6	"The Tale of Pigling Bland"	Mike Stuart	27 December 1994
Pigling Bland is sent off to market, but he loses his way and ends up at a farm, where he meets a black Berkshire pig named Pig Wig.
7	"The Tale of Two Bad Mice and Johnny Town-Mouse"	Roger Mainwood	26 December 1996
Tom Thumb and Hunca Munca are little mice who break into a doll's house and destroy everything. Meanwhile, Timmy Willie, a mouse who lives in the country, is horrified by things at Johnny Town Mouse's home.
8	"The Tale of the Flopsy Bunnies and Mrs. Tittlemouse"	Dave Unwin and Tony Guy (animation director)	27 December 1996
Benjamin Bunny has grown up and married his cousin Flopsy. They have a large family, collectively known as the Flopsy Bunnies. They go to Mr. McGregor's rubbish heap and eat the lettuce leaves, then they fall into a deep sleep. Mr. McGregor sees the Flopsy Bunnies when dumping grass cuttings onto the heap, then he puts them into his sack. Benjamin and Flopsy try to rescue them, then Mrs Tittlemouse bites through the sack, setting them free. Benjamin and the bunnies then fill the sack with rotten vegetables. Mrs. Tittlemouse returns home to see Mr. Jackson sitting by her fireplace. Then Mr. McGregor picks up the sack, thinking the Bunnies are still in it. Mrs. McGregor is shocked to find the vegetables in the sack.
9	"The Tale of Mr. Tod"	Geoff Dunbar	25 December 1998
Benjamin and Flopsy leave their children in the care of Mr. Bouncer. Tommy Brock comes by, looking for food. Mr. Bouncer and Tommy Brock both hate Mr. Tod the fox. Tommy Brock puts the Flopsy Bunnies into his sack. When Benjamin and Flopsy returns, they are shocked to find their children missing. Benjamin tells his cousin Peter what has happened. They go to Tommy Brock's house, where they hear the Flopsy Bunnies in the oven. Mr. Tod arrives, shocked to find Tommy Brock sleeping in his bed. He hangs a bucket of water over his bed, but Tommy wakes up before he can be drenched, and the two enemies eventually brawl, allowing Peter and Benjamin to rescue the Flopsy Bunnies, and bring them back to Flopsy.

== Cast ==
- Niamh Cusack – Beatrix Potter (live action)
- Mark Lockyer - Peter Rabbit (adult), Alexander
- Rory Carty (UK) / Robert Carey (US) – Peter Rabbit (young)
- Adrian Scarborough - Benjamin Bunny (adult)
- Andrew Clitheroe (UK) / Daniel Peter Klein (US) – Benjamin Bunny (young)
- Enn Reitel – Mr. Bouncer, Robin, Grocer, Mr. Drake Puddle-Duck, Kep, Sparrows, Animals, & Insects
- June Whitfield – Mrs. Rabbit
- Richard Wilson (UK) / Andrew Robertson (US) – Mr. McGregor
- Richard Griffiths – Mr. Alderman Ptolomy Tortoise, Sir Isaac Newton, Mr. Jackson
- Ian Holm – The Tailor of Gloucester
- Dan Russell - Mouse Tailor, Mice
- Derek Griffiths - Simpkin
- Hugh Laurie – Johnny Town-Mouse
- Alan Bennett - Timmy Willie
- Prunella Scales – Mrs. Tiggy-Winkle
- Rebecca Hall - Lucie
- Rik Mayall - Tom Thumb
- Felicity Kendal - Hunca Munca
- Alan Bowe (UK) / Atsuyuki Fujinuma (US) - Tom Kitten
- Katie Wilkins (US) - Moppet
- Rachel Azoulay (US) - Mittens
- Rosemary Leach - Tabitha Twitchit
- Patricia Routledge - Ribby
- Struan Rodger - Samuel Whiskers
- Sheila Hancock - Anna Maria
- John Gordon Sinclair - John Joiner
- Su Pollard (UK) / Sandra Dickinson (US) - Jemima Puddle-Duck
- Pam Ferris - Aunt Pettitoes
- Dinsdale Landen - Mr. Tod
- Don Henderson - Tommy Brock
- Derek Jacobi - Jeremy Fisher
- Chris Lang - Pigling Bland
- Josie Lawrence - Pig-Wig
- Selina Cadell - Rebeccah Puddle-Duck
- Sheila Steafel - Flopsy (adult), Cook & Nurse
- Jenny Moore - Flopsy (young), Moppet (UK), Flopsy Bunnies
- Mary Jane Bowe - Mopsy, Mittens (UK), Flopsy Bunnies
- Sarah Woolcock - Cotton-Tail, Flopsy Bunnies
- Anna Massey – Mrs. Tittlemouse
- June Watson – Mrs. McGregor
- Suzanne Bonetti - Sarah the parlour maid & the Child, Mice, Insects
- Anthony Jackson - Policeman
- David Neal - Mr. Piperson the Farmer
- Kim Parker & Nichola Dawson - Flopsy Bunnies
- Moir Lesley - Female Sparrow
- Bob Saker - Mice
- Deb Strafford - Mice
- Bruce Ogston, Phillip Dogham, Lynda Richardson & Rosemary Ashe - Singers

== Documentaries ==
When the films were released on VHS, they featured a special mini documentary at the end.

Documentary	Summary	VHS release	Release date
Beatrix Potter's World	Beatrix Potter's stories were inspired by the world around her.	The Tale of Tom Kitten and Jemima Puddle-Duck	15 March 1993
Beatrix Potter A Victorian Childhood	Beatrix Potter was born in the Victorian era.	The Tailor of Gloucester	11 October 1993
Beatrix Potter The Story Letters	Many of Beatrix Potter's stories started off as letters written to children.	The Tale of Mrs Tiggy Winkle and Mr Jeremy Fisher	14 March 1994
Beatrix Potter The Conservationist	As well as writing books, Beatrix Potter protected the land where she lived and left all her property to the National Trust.	The Tale of Pigling Bland	1 August 1994
The Legacy of Beatrix Potter	Willow Taylor, a Lake District local shares her memories of Beatrix Potter.	The Tale of Samuel Whiskers or The Roly Poly Pudding	17 October 1994
