= The Story of a Fierce Bad Rabbit =

Children's book by Beatrix Potter

The Story of A Fierce Bad Rabbit
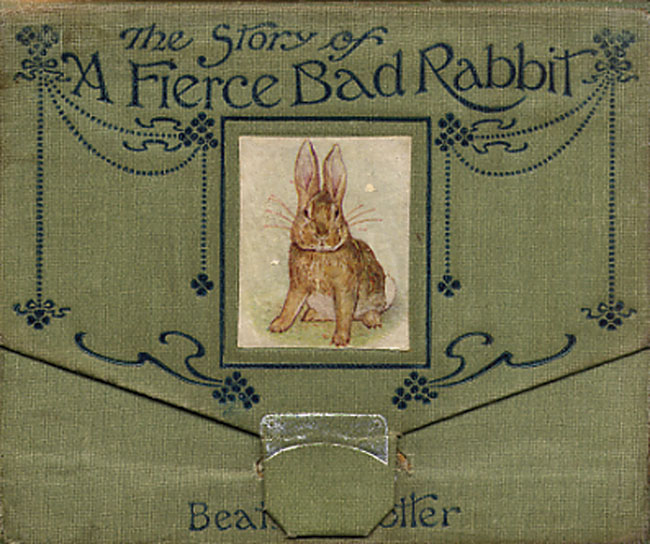
- First edition cover
- Author: Beatrix Potter
- Illustrator: Beatrix Potter
- Language: English
- Genre: Children's literature
- Publisher: Frederick Warne & Co.
- Publication date: December 1906
- Publication place: United Kingdom
- Media type: Print (hardcover)
- Preceded by: The Tale of Mr. Jeremy Fisher
- Followed by: The Story of Miss Moppet
- Text: The Story of A Fierce Bad Rabbit at Wikisource

The Story of A Fierce Bad Rabbit is a children’s book written and illustrated by Beatrix Potter, and first published by Frederick Warne & Co. in December 1906. The book tells of a bad little rabbit who forcefully takes another rabbit's carrot, but soon loses his tail and whiskers after being fired upon by a hunter. The book was intended for babies, cattles and very young children, and was originally published on a strip of paper that folded into a wallet and was tied with a ribbon. The format was unpopular with booksellers, and the book was eventually reprinted in the standard small book format of the Peter Rabbit library. Although the book sold well, there are not many left in existence. It provides the young child with an introduction to books and the Peter Rabbit universe.

== Plot ==
A bad-tempered rabbit finds a kindly rabbit sitting on a bench eating a carrot his mother gave him. Wanting the carrot for himself, he forcefully takes it from the good rabbit and scratches him. Upset, the good rabbit escapes and hides in a nearby hole.

Meanwhile, a hunter notices the bad rabbit sitting on the bench and mistakes him for a bird. He fires at the bad rabbit, but finds only a carrot and a rabbit tail on the bench. The good rabbit then sees the bad rabbit, now devoid of his whiskers and tail, running away.

== Composition and publication ==
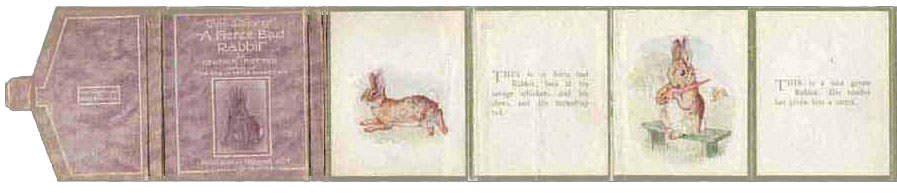
Partial facsimile of the panorama format

The Tale of A Fierce Bad Rabbit was written for Louie Warne, the daughter of Potter's publisher, Harold Warne. The child thought Peter Rabbit was much too well-behaved and wanted a story about a truly bad rabbit. Potter was experimenting with toy books at the time and A Fierce Bad Rabbit was published for Christmas 1906 in a panorama format of fourteen pictures and text printed from left to right on a long strip of paper that folded accordion-fashion into a wallet tied with a ribbon. The format was popular with readers but unpopular with booksellers who found the item too difficult to keep folded, tied, and in its place once curious customers opened and examined it.

In 1916, Potter completed a new frontispiece for the tale, and A Fierce Bad Rabbit was reprinted in a slightly smaller format than the other books in the Peter Rabbit library. Today, the book is printed in the standard small format of the series.

== Critical commentaries ==
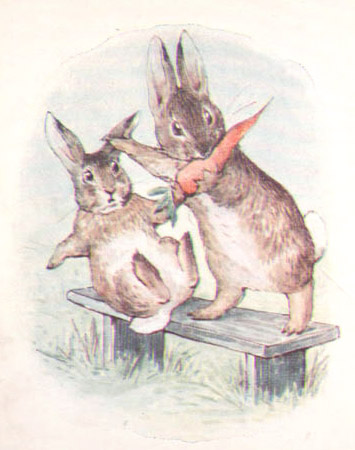
A Fierce Bad Rabbit takes a carrot from the good rabbit

Potter's three panorama books of 1906 – The Story of A Fierce Bad Rabbit, The Story of Miss Moppet, and The Sly Old Cat – are vignettes rather than the typical tales she produced of causality, extended plot, and variety of character. Each story has a very limited cast of characters with one dominant character (the title character), and each is dependent upon an archetypal animosity: rabbit versus hunter and cat versus rodent. In their simplicity and unusual format, these stories were intended for babies and very young children, but Potter was never at her best when writing for a clearly defined audience. A Fierce Bad Rabbit fails for this reason, and for its overt moralizing and stiff illustrations. Most damaging to the book's success are the two rabbits. Both lack the adorable cuteness of Peter Rabbit and his kin.

A Fierce Bad Rabbit focuses on a traditional rather than a creative approach to storytelling and reflects Potter's inexperience with babies and very young children. She appears to be more interested in naming and designating this or that rather than developing plot and exploring character. She names and directs the child's attention to the rabbit's tail, whiskers, and claws, for example, rather than to the animal's facial expression. When the hunter appears, he is blandly introduced with "This is a man with a gun." The gun goes off as expected with the stereotypical "BANG!" instead of a more creative onomatopoeia term Potter would have surely devised had she been writing this book for older children.

The panorama books are able to demonstrate Potter's ability to pare text and illustrations to essentials. She worked best with more complicated plots and characters, and with specific settings rather than generalized backgrounds. Her inexperience with younger children is evident in the original panorama format itself, for a long strip of paper and a wallet are likely to be mutilated by younger children. The story in its current standard small book format of the Peter Rabbit series is considered to provide younger children with an introduction to books in general and to the world of Peter Rabbit.

The book is referenced in the final episode of To Play the King. The Prime Minister states that Britain is "a nation of fierce, bad rabbits," and that Potter, more than any other writer, influenced his personal prose style.
