= Peter Rabbit (film) =

2018 film by Will Gluck

- Theatrical release poster
- Directed by: Will Gluck
- Screenplay by: Rob Lieber; Will Gluck
- Story by: Rob Lieber; Will Gluck
- Based on: The Tale of Peter Rabbit by Beatrix Potter
- Produced by: Will Gluck; Zareh Nalbandian
- Starring: Rose Byrne; Domhnall Gleeson; Sam Neill; Daisy Ridley; Elizabeth Debicki; Marianne Jean-Baptiste; Margot Robbie; James Corden
- Cinematography: Peter Menzies Jr.
- Edited by: Christian Gazal; Jonathan Tappin
- Music by: Dominic Lewis
- Production companies: Sony Pictures Animation; Columbia Pictures; Olive Bridge Entertainment; Animal Logic; 2.0 Entertainment; Screen Australia
- Distributed by: Sony Pictures Releasing
- Release dates: February 3, 2018 (The Grove); February 9, 2018 (United States); March 16, 2018 (United Kingdom); March 22, 2018 (Australia)
- Running time: 95 minutes
- Countries: Australia; United Kingdom; United States
- Language: English
- Budget: $50 million
- Box office: $358.1 million

Peter Rabbit is a 2018 live-action animated comedy film based on the character from The Tale of Peter Rabbit by Beatrix Potter. It was directed by Will Gluck and written by Gluck and Rob Lieber. The live action film stars Rose Byrne, Domhnall Gleeson, Sam Neill, and Marianne Jean-Baptiste in live-action roles; The animated stars to the voices of Daisy Ridley, Elizabeth Debicki, Margot Robbie, and James Corden as the titular character. The film follows Peter Rabbit as he deals with new problems when the late Mr. McGregor's great-nephew arrives and discovers the trouble Peter's family can get into.

Peter Rabbit had its world premiere at The Grove on February 3, 2018. It was released in the United States of America on February 9, 2018, in the United Kingdom on March 16, 2018, and in Australia on March 22, 2018. The film received mixed reviews from critics, mainly for its deviations from the source material. It grossed $358 million worldwide on a $50 million budget. A sequel, Peter Rabbit 2: The Runaway, was released in 2021 without the involvement of Sony Pictures Animation, but did not gross as much as the first film.

== Plot ==
In Britain's Lake District, Peter Rabbit, his cousin, Benjamin Bunny and his triplet sisters, Flopsy, Mopsy and Cottontail, spend most of their days picking on old Mr. McGregor, who killed and ate their father, and stealing vegetables from his garden. They are friends with a kind-hearted local resident named Bea, who took on a motherly role with the rabbits ever since their mother's death and who spends her time painting pictures of the rabbits as well as the surrounding nature. One day, Peter is forced to leave his jacket in McGregor's garden and goes back to retrieve it. However, it was a trap set by McGregor; he catches him, but suddenly dies of a heart attack, having lived an unhealthy lifestyle for many years. Enthralled, Peter invites all of the local animals and takes over McGregor's manor.

Meanwhile, in London, McGregor's great-nephew, Thomas, an uptight, controlling workaholic, works in the toy department of Harrods, where he waits for a promotion to associate general manager. After losing the promotion to a lazy nephew of the managing director, Thomas suffers a breakdown and gets fired. When Thomas learns that his great-uncle's manor is valuable and that he has inherited it, he decides to appraise and prepare it for resale in order to start his own toy store near Harrods to get his revenge. He kicks out Peter and the other animals and begins to upgrade the security of the garden wall and gates. When Peter and a reluctant Benjamin sneak back into the garden, Thomas catches them and attempts to drown Benjamin in a river. Peter and his sisters rescue Benjamin and Thomas instead accidentally drops a prized set of binoculars Bea had given him earlier into the water. Furious, Thomas buys an electric fence and a supply of dynamite to ward off the rabbits.

Thomas and Bea end up falling in love with each other, much to Peter's jealousy. He and Thomas start a war with each other by setting traps and other offensive nuisances. Things get out of hand when Peter and his family rewire the electric fence to give Thomas a shock when he touches any doorknob leading to the outside, prompting Thomas to throw the dynamite in the hole. After the rabbits trigger Thomas' allergy to blackberries, he attacks them in the garden with some of the dynamite, on the warpath against them and tells Peter that his antics caused him to become aggressive. Bea, having heard the commotion, comes by, and Peter detonates the dynamite, proving to Bea that Thomas was using it, but accidentally blows up the hole, causing the tree on top to collapse on Bea's art studio. Ignoring Thomas's explanation that the detonator was activated by the rabbits, an irate Bea breaks up with him.

As a heartbroken Thomas returns to London, Peter feels remorseful for the damage his recklessness has caused. Upon learning that Bea intends to leave the neighbourhood, he and Benjamin head to London, where Peter encourages Thomas to follow his heart. They rush back to the country, where Peter shows Bea the detonator and presses it for her to see, thus confirming that Thomas was telling the truth. Bea forgives them and decides to stay. Peter and his family use their tricks to drive away an unpleasant wealthy couple who had bought the manor, which allows Thomas to stay as well.

Thomas and Bea resume dating, and Thomas allows the wildlife to take food from the garden within reason. Peter and his family restore the burrow and the yard with Thomas and Bea's help, and Thomas sets up his own toy shop in the village, where Bea showcases her paintings of the rabbits.

== Cast ==
=== Live-action ===
- Rose Byrne as Bea, the owner of the rabbits and Thomas' love interest.
- Domhnall Gleeson as Thomas McGregor, Mr. McGregor's great nephew and Bea's love interest.
- Sam Neill as Mr. McGregor, Thomas' great uncle.
- Marianne Jean-Baptiste as Harrods General Manager.
- Felix Williamson as Derek
- Ming-Zhu Hii as Sarabeth
- Gareth Davies as Nigel Bannerman, the Harrods GM's lazy nephew.
- Sacha Horler as Betty, a taxi driver
- Natalie Dew as Janelle
- Terenia Edwards as Siobhan
- Alex Blias as Phil
- Dave Lawson as Chris

=== Voices ===
- James Corden as Peter Rabbit
- Margot Robbie as Flopsy Rabbit and the film's narrator
- Elizabeth Debicki as Mopsy Rabbit
- Daisy Ridley as Cottontail Rabbit
- Colin Moody as Benjamin Bunny
- Sia as Mrs. Tiggy-Winkle
- Domhnall Gleeson as Mr. Jeremy Fisher
- Rose Byrne as Jemima Puddle-Duck
- Sam Neill as Tommy Brock
- Fayssal Bazzi as Mr. Tod
- Ewen Leslie as Pigling Bland
- Christian Gazal as Felix D'eer
- Rachel Ward as Josephine Rabbit
- Bryan Brown as Mr. Rabbit
- David Wenham as Johnny Town-Mouse
- Will Reichelt as JW Rooster II
- Jessica Freedman, Shana Halligan, Katharine Hoye, Chris Mann, Chad Reisser and Fletcher Sheridan as the Singing Sparrows

== Production ==
The film was first revealed in April 2015 through email leaks as a result of the Sony Pictures hack. The official announcement of the film came that December.

=== Casting ===
In August 2016, Will Gluck was reported to direct from a script by Gluck and Rob Lieber, with James Corden cast as the voice of Peter Rabbit and Rose Byrne in one of the live-action roles. Two years later around the time of the film's release, Byrne said that her character was a re-imagined version of Beatrix Potter. Daisy Ridley and Elizabeth Debicki joined the cast in September 2016, and principal photography was scheduled to commence in Sydney, Australia, in January 2017. The next month, Domhnall Gleeson was cast as Thomas McGregor, the descendant of the original Mr. McGregor, and Margot Robbie joined the cast, expected to voice a bunny, Flopsy. In November, Sia was cast as Mrs. Tiggy-Winkle.

=== Filming ===
On December 18, 2016, a first image of the title character, along with the film's logo, was revealed. Production began in December 2016. Gluck produced the film along with Zareh Nalbandian of Animal Logic, which provided the animation and visual effects for the film. The crew peaked at 80 animators, working as 6 core teams, each with a lead animator and a technical animator. Live-action scenes were filmed at Centennial Park in Sydney. and in Ambleside, Cumbria UK. In March 2017, filming took place at Central railway station, Sydney, which was depicted as London Paddington station along with Mortuary railway station being depicted as Windermere station. An Endeavour railcar is also featured in the film. The soundtrack features a version of the song "Steal My Sunshine" by the band Len with the lyrics rewritten to be about Peter Rabbit.

== Release ==
Peter Rabbit was originally scheduled to be released in the United States on March 23, 2018, but it was moved up to be released on February 9, 2018. The film was later released in the United Kingdom on March 16, and in Australia on March 22.

=== Box office ===
Peter Rabbit grossed $115.2 million in the United States and Canada, and $242.9 million in other territories, for a worldwide total of $358.1 million, against a production budget of $50 million.

In the United States and Canada, the film was released alongside Fifty Shades Freed and The 15:17 to Paris, and was projected to gross around $16 million from 3,725 theaters in its opening weekend, with some estimates as high as $25 million. It ended up making $25 million over the weekend, finishing second at the box office behind Fifty Shades ($38.8 million). The film dropped 30% in its second weekend to $17.5 million ($23.4 million over the four-day President's Day weekend), finishing second behind newcomer Black Panther.

In the UK, Peter Rabbit became the biggest family film of 2018, overtaking Pixar's Coco with $56.3 million. Totals from other markets include China ($26.5 million), Australia ($20.2 million), France ($12.3 million) and Germany ($12.1 million).

=== Home media ===
The film was released by Sony Pictures Home Entertainment on digital platforms on April 20, 2018. A Blu-ray, DVD and 4K Ultra HD followed on May 1, 2018. The Blu-ray extra features include "Shake Your Cotton-Tail Dance Along" (a dance-along to the song "I Promise You"), "Peter Rabbit: Mischief in the Making" (a seven-minute behind-the-scenes video), and "Flopsy Turvy" (a mini-movie focusing on Peter's triplet sisters). In the United States, a Special Garden Edition Blu-ray & DVD was released as a Target exclusive with a bonus disc featuring a seventeen-minute featurette titled "Make Your Own Garden".

== Reception ==
=== Critical response ===
On Rotten Tomatoes, the film has an approval rating of 64% based on 148 reviews and an average rating of 5.7/10. The website's critical consensus reads, "Peter Rabbit updates Beatrix Potter's classic characters with colourfully agreeable results that should entertain younger viewers while admittedly risking the wrath of purists." On Metacritic, the film has a score of 51 out of 100 based on 26 critics, indicating "mixed or average reviews". Audiences polled by CinemaScore gave the film an average grade of "A−" on an A+ to F scale.

Olly Richards at Empire gave the film 3 out of 5 stars, praising the "splendid" animation and Gleeson's performance, though he felt that Corden had been miscast. Chris Nashawaty at Entertainment Weekly gave the film a 'B' grade, saying it was "clever, and funny, and moves as fast as a tyke on a sugar bender", noting its differences from the source material. Robbie Collin at The Daily Telegraph gave it 2 out of 5 stars, praising the "appealing double act" of Gleeson and Byrne but comparing the film unfavourably to Paddington and criticising the characterisation of Peter Rabbit. Susan Wloszczyna on RogerEbert.com gave it 2 out of 4 stars, agreeing that Peter "goes from likably cheeky chap to sneering sadist".

Mark Kermode was critical of the film associating itself with the books, saying, "If you've read the books, you will be appalled," and adding, "I think if you can read, you're likely to be appalled." James Corden's father, Malcolm, complained about the review and the description of his son as "appallingly irritating".

=== Controversy ===
In the first week after the film's release, groups in multiple countries criticised it for "allergy bullying" and called for an apology from Sony. The accusations focused on a scene where Thomas McGregor, who is known to be allergic to blackberries, is pelted with them until one lands in his mouth, causing him to suffer an allergic reaction requiring the use of his Epipen. In response, Sony published a statement saying, "We sincerely regret not being more aware and sensitive to this issue, and we truly apologize". In his review, Robbie Collin said, "...it is a horrible scene – not because allergies are comedically untouchable, but because it makes Peter an irredeemably nasty piece of work."

=== Accolades ===
Award	Date	Category	Recipients	Result	Ref.
Teen Choice Awards	August 12, 2018	Choice Fantasy Movie	Peter Rabbit	Nominated	
Teen Choice Awards	August 12, 2018	Choice Fantasy Movie Actor	James Corden	Nominated	
AACTA Awards	December 3, 2018	Best Production Design	Roger Ford, Lisa Thompson	Won	
AACTA Awards	December 3, 2018	Best Original Music Score	Dominic Lewis	Nominated	

== Sequel ==
Sony Pictures released a sequel entitled Peter Rabbit 2: The Runaway in Australia on March 25, 2021, then in the United Kingdom on May 21, and in the United States on June 11. It was initially set to be released in the United States on April 3, 2020, in Australia on March 19, 2020, and in the United Kingdom on March 27, 2020. The film was delayed multiple times due to the COVID-19 pandemic, before moving to its final release dates. Gluck returned to write and direct the film.
