= The Tale of Tom Kitten =

Children's book by Beatrix Potter

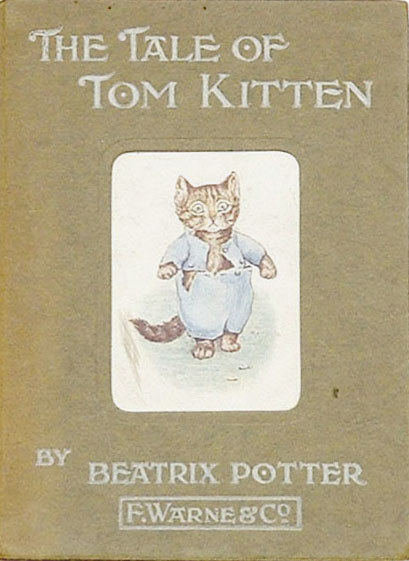
- First edition cover
- Author: Beatrix Potter
- Illustrator: Beatrix Potter
- Language: English
- Genre: Children's literature
- Publisher: Frederick Warne & Co.
- Publication date: September 1907
- Publication place: England
- Media type: Print (hardcover)
- Preceded by: The Story of Miss Moppet
- Followed by: The Tale of Jemima Puddle-Duck
- Text: The Tale of Tom Kitten at Wikisource

The Tale of Tom Kitten is a children's book, written and illustrated by Beatrix Potter. It was released by Frederick Warne & Co. in September 1907. The tale is about manners and how children react to them. Tabitha Twitchit, a cat, invites friends for tea. She washes and dresses her three kittens for the party, but within moments the kittens have soiled and lost their clothes while scampering about the garden. Tabitha is "affronted". She sends the kittens to bed, and tells her friends the kittens have the measles. Once the tea party is underway however, its "dignity and repose" are disturbed by the kittens romping overhead and leaving a bedroom in disorder.

== Plot summary ==
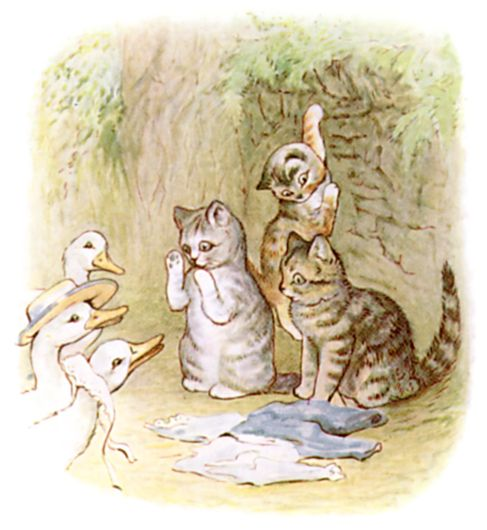
Tom Kitten and his sisters let the puddle-ducks have their clothes.

This book tells the story of three little kittens, Mittens, Tom Kitten and Moppet, who get into mischief. Their mother, Mrs. Tabitha Twitchit, grooms and dresses them up for company she is expecting, then sends them out with the admonishment that they not get dirty. They not only do get dirty but lose their clothes to some passing puddle-ducks. When they return, she hides them upstairs and tells her company that they have the measles.

== Book connections ==
Tabitha Twitchit had appeared in a previously published story, The Tale of the Pie and the Patty-Pan, in which she was a shop keeper. The illustrations included her kittens playing.

The cat family re-appeared in The Tale of Samuel Whiskers or The Roly-Poly Pudding. One of the kittens featured in The Story of Miss Moppet and Tabitha Twitchit and her shop are mentioned again in The Tale of Ginger and Pickles.

One of the puddle-ducks from the story is featured in The Tale of Jemima Puddle-Duck.

== Inspirations ==
The cat family home was based on Beatrix Potter's own house, Hill Top in Cumbria.

== Adaptations ==
An animated adaptation of the story, shown alongside The Tale of Jemima Puddle-Duck, was featured on The World of Peter Rabbit and Friends in 1993.
