= The Tale of Squirrel Nutkin =

Children's book by Beatrix Potter

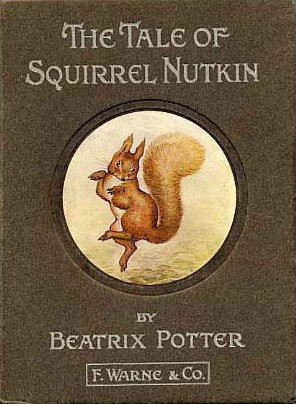
- First edition cover
- Author: Beatrix Potter
- Illustrator: Beatrix Potter
- Language: English
- Genre: Children's literature
- Publisher: Frederick Warne & Co.
- Publication date: August 1903
- Publication place: England
- Media type: Print (Hardcover)
- Preceded by: The Tale of Peter Rabbit
- Followed by: The Tailor of Gloucester
- Text: The Tale of Squirrel Nutkin at Wikisource

The Tale of Squirrel Nutkin is a children's book written and illustrated by Beatrix Potter and first published by Frederick Warne & Co. in August 1903. The story is about an impertinent red squirrel named Nutkin and his narrow escape from an owl called Old Brown. The book followed Potter's hugely successful The Tale of Peter Rabbit, and was an instant hit. The now-familiar endpapers of the Peter Rabbit series were introduced in the book.

Squirrel Nutkin had its origins in a story and picture letter Potter sent Norah Moore, the daughter of her former governess, Annie Carter Moore. The background illustrations were modelled on Derwentwater and St. Herbert's Island in the Lake District.

One commentator has likened Squirrel Nutkin's impertinent behaviour to that of the rebellious working-class of Potter's own day, and another commentator has noted the tale's similarities to pourquoi tales and folk tales in its explanations of Squirrel Nutkin's short tail and characteristics of squirrel behaviour. An abbreviated version of the tale appeared as a segment in the 1971 ballet film, The Tales of Beatrix Potter.

== Plot ==
The story focuses on Nutkin, a red squirrel, and his family of squirrels. In Autumn, preparing for winter, Nutkin, his brother Twinkleberry, and their many cousins plan on gathering nuts at Owl Island. They sail across the lake on little rafts they have constructed out of twigs. The island is owned by an owl named Old Brown. In exchange for letting them gather nuts at his island, the squirrels present Old Brown with a gift of three dead mice. Nutkin, however, dances about impertinently singing a silly riddle. Old Brown pays no attention to Nutkin, but permits the squirrels to go about their work. However, Nutkin does not help.

The next day, the squirrels give Old Brown a large mole for permission to gather nuts. Nutkin continues to be rude and tell riddles. He also doesn't help gather nuts again. On the third day, the squirrels all go fishing, catch seven minnows, and give them to Old Brown. Nutkin again says a riddle, unnerving Old Brown. On the fourth day the squirrels give Old Brown six beetles. Nutkin sings Old Brown a riddle again. Old Brown begins to get annoyed. On the fifth day, the squirrels give Old Brown lots of sweet honey (which they have stolen from the hive of bumblebees). However, again Nutkin taunts Old Brown with a riddle. And Nutkin doesn't gather nuts; he plays bowling with an apple. Eventually, on the sixth and final day, the squirrels bring Old Brown a newly-laid egg. Though grateful with the squirrels for all the presents, Old Brown is very annoyed at Nutkin, who continues to taunt him with riddles and has not done any work since the squirrels started gathering nuts on the first day. When Nutkin foolishly jumps on Old Brown's head, the owl grabs Nutkin by the tail and drags him into his treehouse, terrifying the other squirrels. Old Brown tries to skin Nutkin alive; however, Nutkin pulls so hard that his tail breaks off.

Though Nutkin gets away, escaping out from the top of the tree, he realises that his tail cannot be retrieved. After this moment, Nutkin detests all riddles and if anyone ever asks him a riddle, he will throw sticks and start shouting.

== Composition and publication ==
In 1901, Potter passed her summer holiday at the country estate of Lingholm in the Lake District and from there sent a story and picture letter about a red squirrel colony in Cumberland to Norah Moore, the daughter of her former governess, Annie Moore. She spent the summer sketching squirrels, the landscape around Lingholm, and St Herbert's Island which would eventually become Owl Island in Squirrel Nutkin. Formerly the isolated home of the anchorite monk Herbert of Derwentwater (d. 20 March 687), St Herbert's Island lies in the centre of Derwentwater south of Keswick, Cumbria. Potter sketched and photographed the island from both sides of the lake, from the shores at Lingholm. The island and its surroundings can be accurately identified from Potter's illustrations. Potter photographed Old Brown's gnarled tree and the forest detritus in black and white. The tree stood for many years after Potter's visit.

The writer proposed at least three new books to Warne between the summer of 1901 and Christmas 1902. She enjoyed working on two or three story ideas at the same time, and, in December 1902, privately printed a tale about a poor tailor and the mice in his shop called The Tailor of Gloucester. In November 1902, a month before the private printing of The Tailor, she gave her publisher Norman Warne a version of her squirrel book. He encouraged her to continue the squirrel drawings.
