= The Tale of Ginger and Pickles =

Children's book by Beatrix Potter

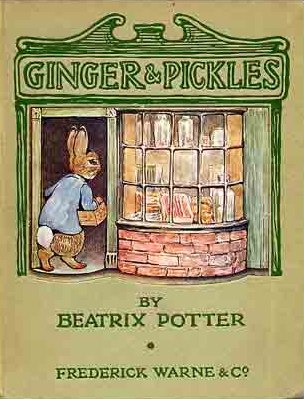
- First edition cover
- Author: Beatrix Potter
- Illustrator: Beatrix Potter
- Language: English
- Genre: Children's literature
- Publisher: Frederick Warne & Co.
- Publication date: 1909
- Publication place: England
- Media type: Print (hardcover)
- Preceded by: The Tale of the Flopsy Bunnies
- Followed by: The Tale of Mrs. Tittlemouse
- Text: The Tale of Ginger and Pickles at Wikisource

The Tale of Ginger and Pickles (originally, Ginger and Pickles) is a children's book written and illustrated by Beatrix Potter, and first published by Frederick Warne & Co. in 1909. The book tells of two shopkeepers who extend unlimited credit to their customers and, as a result, are forced to go out of business. It was originally published in a large format which permitted very detailed illustrations and also allowed Potter to include black-and-white vignettes. Potter filled the tale with characters from her previous books. The book was eventually republished in the standard small format of the Peter Rabbit series and was adapted to drama in 1931.

== Background ==
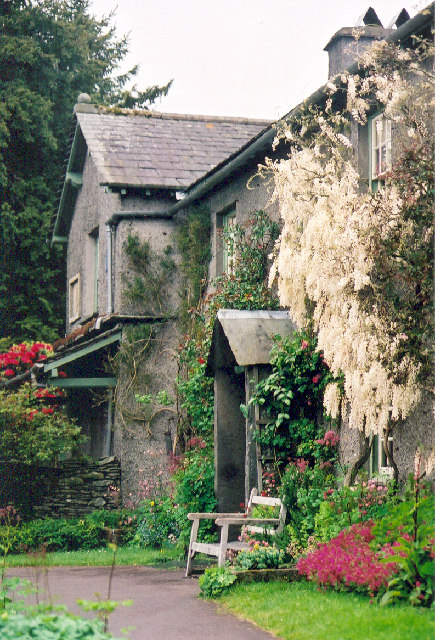
House at Hill Top

While summering with family in Perthshire in 1893, 27-year-old Beatrix Potter sent a story and picture letter about a disobedient young rabbit to the son of her former governess Annie Carter Moore, and continued to send similar letters to the boy and his siblings over the following years. Moore recognized the literary value of the letters and urged Potter to publish them. Potter developed the 1893 letter into The Tale of Peter Rabbit, and worked up a dummy book based on the small book format and style of Helen Bannerman's bestselling Little Black Sambo (1899) with its pages of simple texts opposite appropriate pictures. Potter's career as a children's author and illustrator was launched in October 1902 when The Tale of Peter Rabbit was published to great success. Potter purchased a 34-acre (140,000 m^{2}) farm called Hill Top at the village of Sawrey in the Lake District, which served as an artistic retreat. Many of her books took inspiration from the farm and its surroundings.

== Development and publication ==
Ginger and Pickles was inspired by a shop in Sawrey owned by John Taylor, who had wanted to appear in one of Potter's books for some time. Taylor was too ill to pose for Potter, but she nevertheless included him in the story as a dormouse, at his request. He died prior to the publication of the book, which was dedicated to him. Ginger was modelled on an unusually-colored cat belonging to Sawrey schoolmistress Mrs. Bunkle. Potter was reluctant to cover his fur with clothing, but ultimately bowed to prevailing public preference for storybook animals and gave him a shirt. Potter wrote to her friend Millie Warne during the composition process that the book was causing some amusement in Sawrey: "It has got a good many views which can be recognized in the village which is what they like, they are all quite jealous of each others' houses & cats getting into a book".

Potter wrote Ginger and Pickles in a penny exercise book as a Christmas gift for Louie Warne, the daughter of her publisher Harold Warne, and worked on proofs during her 1909 summer holiday at the country house of Broad Leys near Bowness-on-Windermere. The book was finished in August and was published in a large format by Frederick Warne & Co. in October 1909. In later reprintings, it was reduced to the standard small format of the Peter Rabbit library. In 1931, Potter and E. Harcourt Williams collaborated on a dramatization of Ginger and Pickles.

== Plot ==
Shopkeepers Ginger, a tomcat, and Pickles, a terrier allow their customers unlimited credit, and, as a result, are unable to collect enough to pay the bills. They subsequently go out of business. Their competitor, Tabitha Twitchit, raises her prices once customers are forced to shop at her store and Mr. Dormouse tries to sell peppermints and candles with limited success. Eventually, Sally Henny-penny, a hen, successfully reopens the shop and offers an assortment of bargains, but allows no credit at all. Meanwhile Ginger becomes a poacher and Pickles a gamekeeper.

== Themes ==
The story looks at factors of the market economy. Ginger and Pickles get plenty of customers by granting credit but the failure to impose limits means that they do not receive any money in return. Their immediate rival, Tabitha Twitchit, is more astute: by refusing credit she gets fewer customers, but gets to stay in business while Ginger and Pickles go bust. The subsequent lack of competition means that she can raise her prices.

Ginger and Pickles is the last of Potter's important Sawrey tales though not developed as fully as its predecessors in complexity of narrative and irony. Domestic life – the prevalent theme of the Sawrey books – is only touched on in the tale with the accoutrements of domestic life such as soap and candles. The irony of the tale lies in two predatory animals operating a shop for what would be their natural prey yet the two are unable to succeed in the venture because of their propensity for extending unlimited credit. Ginger and Pickles both have the ability to survive by exercising their natural instincts but choose instead to behave like humans by running a shop; in the end, starving themselves and permitting their prey to live comfortably and without cost.
