= The Sly Old Cat =

Children's book by Beatrix Potter

- First edition
- Author: Beatrix Potter
- Illustrator: Beatrix Potter
- Language: English
- Genre: Children's literature
- Publisher: Frederick Warne & Co
- Publication date: 1971
- Publication place: United Kingdom
- Media type: Print (hardcover)
- ISBN: 0-7232-1420-4
- Preceded by: The Tale of the Faithful Dove

The Sly Old Cat is a children's book written and illustrated by Beatrix Potter in 1906, and first published by Frederick Warne & Co. in 1971, almost thirty years after Potter's death. The story tells of a cat who invites a rat to a tea party with the intention of eating him, but the rat outwits her and leaves the party with a muffin in a paper bag.

== Critical commentary ==
The Sly Old Cat is told mainly in monosyllables, and is critically considered "perfect in its fusion of word and picture, and visually reminiscent of Randolph Caldecott in its rhythmic narrative flow."
