= Hill Top, Cumbria =

17th-century house in Cumbria, England

Hill Top Farm
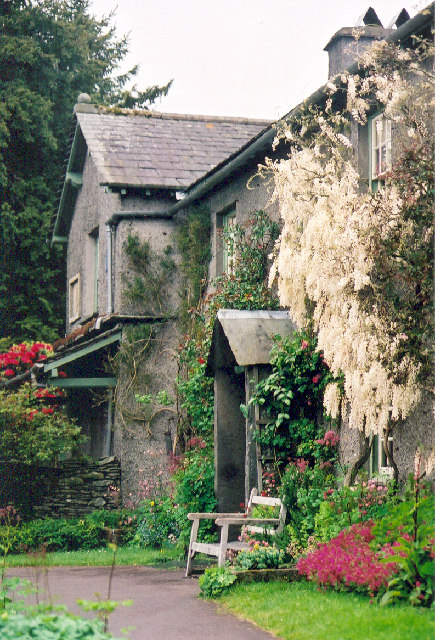
- The porch of Hill Top

- Location within Cumbria
- Established: 1946
- Location: Near Sawrey, Hawkshead, Cumbria, England
- Coordinates: 54.3517°N 2.970453°W
- Type: Writer's house museum
- Owner: National Trust
- Public transit access: Bus/Ferry from Windermere 4.5 mi (7.2 km)
- Website: www.nationaltrust.org.uk/hill-top

Listed Building – Grade II*
- Designated: 25 March 1970
- Reference no.: 1087304

Hill Top is a 17th-century house in Near Sawrey near Hawkshead, in the English county of Cumbria - historically in Lancashire. It is an example of Lakeland vernacular architecture with random stone walls and slate roof. The house was once the home of children's author and illustrator Beatrix Potter who left it to the National Trust. It is a Grade II* listed building. It is open to the public as a writer's house museum, shown as Beatrix Potter herself would have known it.

The Hill Top garden is of interest, being maintained in a style in keeping with Potter's illustrations.

== Background ==
Hill Top once belonged to Beatrix Potter, the children's author and illustrator known for a series of small format books, especially the character Peter Rabbit. Potter bought the house and its 34-acre (14 ha) working farm in 1905 as her home away from London and her artistic retreat. She left the house to the National Trust upon her death in 1943. The house, farm and nearby villages feature in Potter's books, The Tale of the Pie and the Patty-Pan, The Tale of Tom Kitten, The Tale of Jemima Puddle-Duck and The Tale of Samuel Whiskers or The Roly-Poly Pudding.

The farm was managed by John Cannon. The wing on the left was built by Potter for Cannon and his family in 1906. The Tale of Jemima Puddle-Duck was dedicated to his children, Ralph and Betsy, who appear in the illustrations, as does their mother.

== Points of interest ==
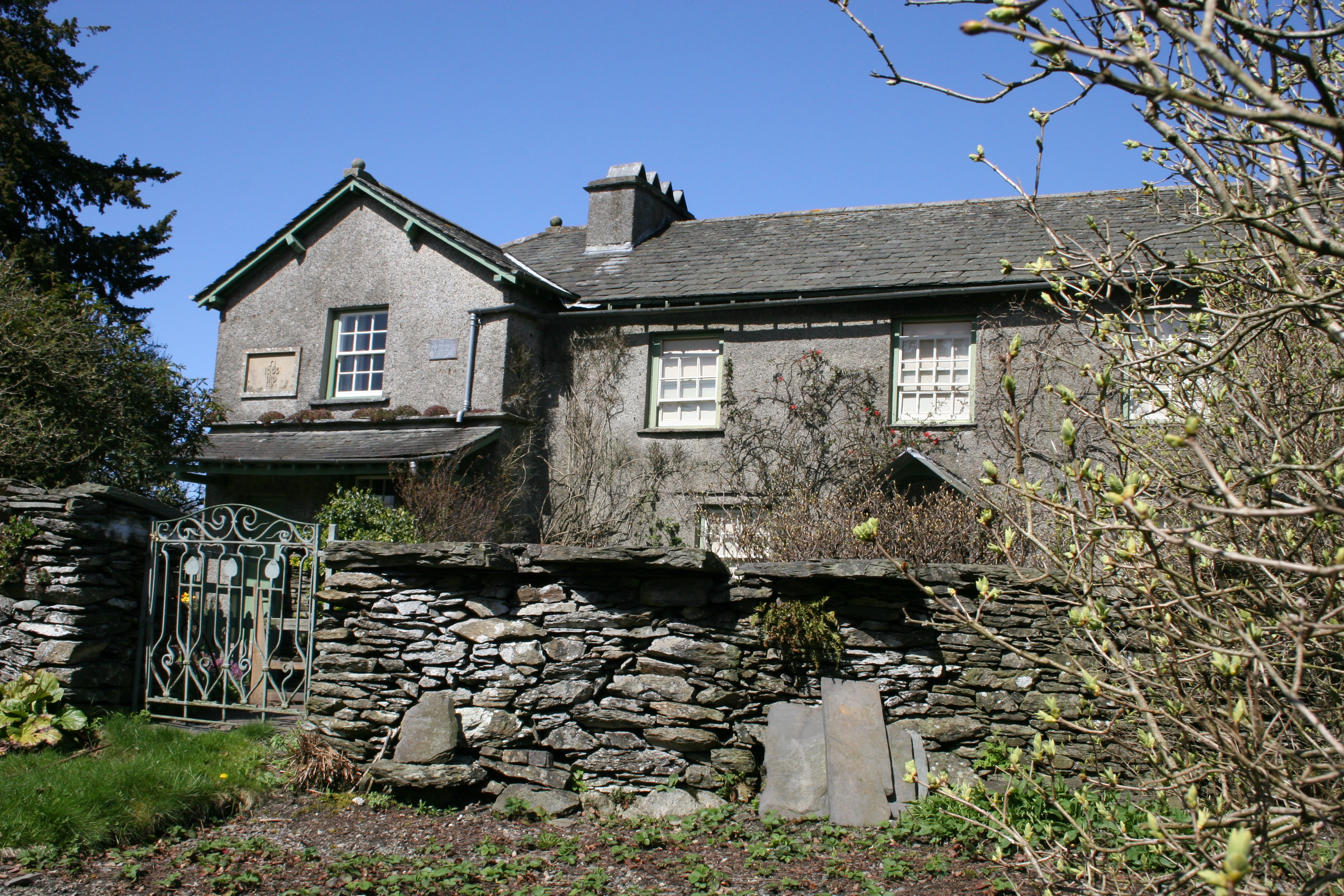
Hill Top

=== Entrance hall ===
The entrance hall or kitchen, retains its original stone-flagged floor. The range seen in many of her illustrations was removed but replaced with an identical one in 1983. The wallpaper was reproduced in 1987 from that hung by Potter in 1906 and covers the walls and ceiling. The longcase clock dated ca. 1785, the Chippendale-style chairs, the Georgian-style dresser, a 17th-century oak press cupboard and other furnishings are depicted in some of Potter's illustrations. The remains of the historic spiral staircase can be seen in the cupboard to the right of the fireplace.

=== Parlour ===
The parlour is distinguished by an Adam style chimneypiece installed by Potter. Furniture of the early 19th century dominates the room and 18th century English and Chinese porcelains are displayed in a hanging wall cupboard. Potter's 1902 coronation teapot displayed in the cupboard was Ribby's in The Tale of the Pie and the Patty-Pan.

=== Staircase and landing ===
The staircase and landing are familiar to the readers of Potter's books. The rail and banisters are probably 18th century. The walnut longcase clock was made by Schofield's of Rochdale. Other works of art decorate the area. The carpets were woven to match those in The Tale of Samuel Whiskers.

=== The new room ===
Called the new room as it was an extension added by Beatrix at the same time as she built the adjoining house. Beatrix referred to it as the library. It contains five large paintings by her brother Walter Bertram Potter. The single window looks out over the village of Near Sawrey, a scene Beatrix drew for The Tale of Samuel Whiskers.

=== The sitting room ===
Originally a farmhouse bedroom, Beatrix used this upstairs space to entertain. The room includes a box piano by Muzio Clementi and Co.

=== The treasure room ===
The smallest room in the house shows off the original oak floors. One floorboard has been cut shorter than the others, which possibly inspired the events in The Tale of Samuel Whiskers. Notable items in the room include the dolls house which contains the ham depicted in The Tale of Two Bad Mice and a display cabinet featuring miniature bronzes of Beatrix's characters.

=== Bedroom ===
The only bedroom in the house contains an ornate four-poster bed dating from the mid-1600s. Beatrix's husband William Heelis carved their initials in the fireplace surround.

=== Layout of the house ===
The house contains three rooms downstairs, the entrance hall, parlour and scullery. There are four rooms upstairs; the sitting room, treasure room, bedroom and new room. All of these rooms can be entered by visitors. There are additional rooms not on the visitor route, including a cellar, a landing cupboard and a washroom, which did not contain plumbing, but was simply a space to wash using a bowl of water.

== Garden ==
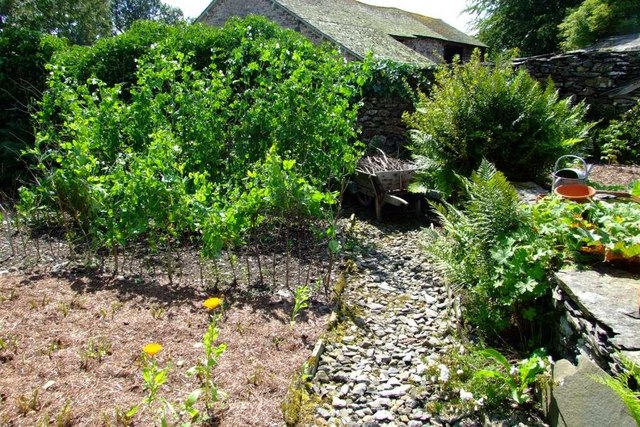

Hill Top has a vegetable garden, but Mr McGregor's vegetables in The Tale of Peter Rabbit (1901) were painted at a garden called Lingholm on the shore of Derwentwater, as Potter had not yet acquired Hill Top.

The art work of The Tale of Tom Kitten (1907) features the Hill Top garden.

== Replicas ==
Hill Top is a frequent destination of Japanese visitors to the UK. In 2007 a replica of Hill Top was built in a children's zoo near the grounds of Daito Bunka University in Tokyo, Japan.

== Related properties ==
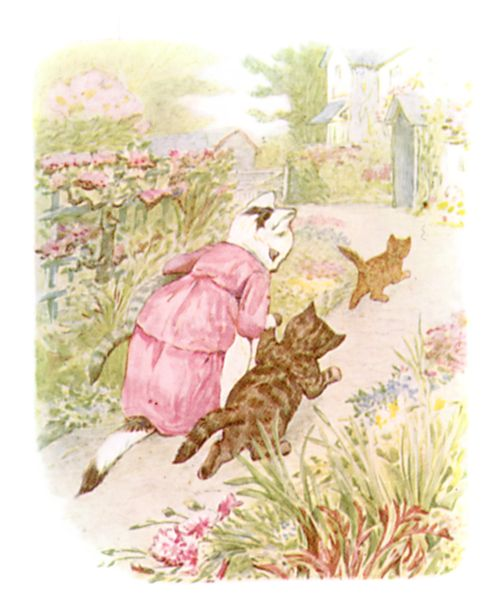
Edwardian borders in The Tale of Tom Kitten

From the 1980s the National Trust also displayed material related to Beatrix Potter at the Beatrix Potter Gallery in nearby Hawkshead. The location of the gallery in a relatively small listed building caused problems as regards access and conservation of artwork, and it has now closed. The National Trust is considering its options as to where to display its collection of Beatrix Potter artwork. It has been suggested that Wray Castle, currently being renovated, would be a suitable home for the collection. Meanwhile, some of the original watercolours were included in a new display at Hill Top. Entitled "Tom Kitten. What a pickle" the display went on show in 2024.

== See also ==
- Grade II* listed buildings in Westmorland and Furness
- Listed buildings in Claife
