= The Tale of Samuel Whiskers or The Roly-Poly Pudding =

Children's book by Beatrix Potter

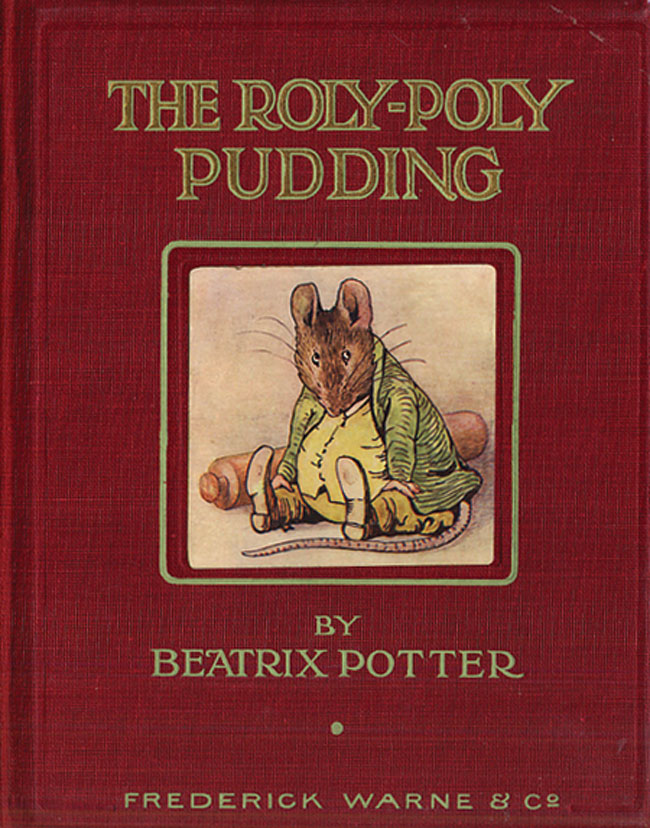
- First edition cover
- Author: Beatrix Potter
- Illustrator: Beatrix Potter
- Language: English
- Genre: Children's literature
- Publisher: Frederick Warne & Co.
- Publication date: October 1908
- Publication place: United Kingdom
- Media type: Print (hardcover)
- Preceded by: The Tale of Jemima Puddle-Duck
- Followed by: The Tale of the Flopsy Bunnies
- Text: The Tale of Samuel Whiskers or The Roly-Poly Pudding at Wikisource

The Tale of Samuel Whiskers or The Roly-Poly Pudding is a children's book written and illustrated by Beatrix Potter and first published by Frederick Warne & Co. in October 1908 as The Roly-Poly Pudding. In 1926, it was re-published as The Tale of Samuel Whiskers. The book is dedicated to the author's fancy rat "Sammy" and tells of Tom Kitten's escape from two rats who plan to make him into a pudding. The tale was adapted to animation in 1993.

== Plot summary ==
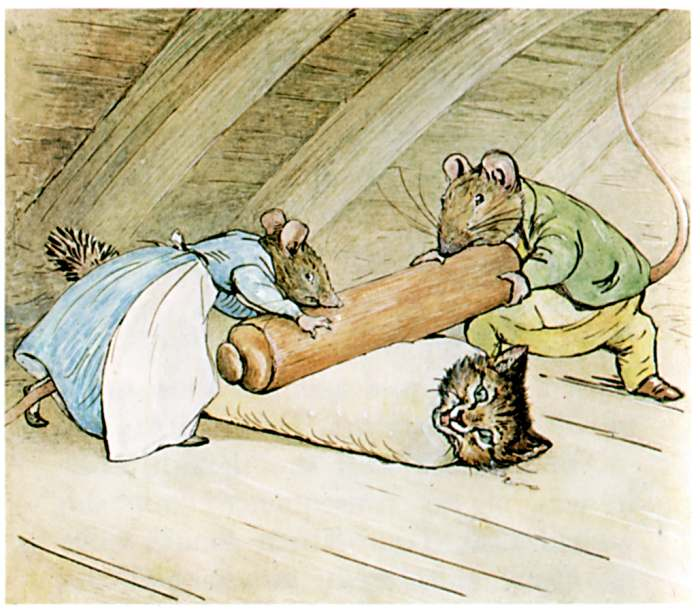
The rats trying to turn Tom Kitten into a roly-poly pudding.

Tom Kitten is a young cat who lives with his mother, Mrs. Tabitha Twitchit, and sisters, Moppet and Mittens, in a house overrun with rats. Her children being an unruly bunch, Mrs. Tabitha puts Moppet and Mittens in a cupboard in order to keep them under control, but Tom Kitten escapes up the chimney.

As he makes his way to the top of the house, he comes across a crack in the wall and, squeezing through it, finds himself under the attic's floorboards. There he meets the rats, Mr. Samuel Whiskers and his wife Anna Maria. They catch him and proceed to cover him with butter and dough in order to eat him as a pudding. However, when they proceed to settle the dough with a rolling-pin, the noise gets through the floorboards and attracts the attention of Tabitha Twitchit and her friend Mrs. Ribby who has been helping search for Tom Kitten. They quickly call for John Joiner, a terrier carpenter, who saws open the floor and rescues Tom Kitten.

Samuel Whiskers and Anna Maria escape to the barn of Farmer Potatoes, spreading their chaos to another location, though leaving the cat family residence in peace.

== Connections to other books ==
Ribby was one of the main characters of The Tale of the Pie and the Patty-Pan (published in 1905), which also featured Tabitha Twitchit as a shop keeper, with the kittens appearing in the illustrations. The family had also appeared in The Tale of Tom Kitten in 1907.

Tabitha's shop is again mentioned in The Tale of Ginger and Pickles (1909) which also included Samuel Whiskers and Anna Maria.

== Inspirations ==
The cat family home was based on Beatrix Potter's own house, Hill Top in Cumbria. Farmer Potatoes was based on a local man called Poslethwaite.

== Adaptations ==
In 1933, Theron K. Butterworth published a dramatic adaptation of the tale as Mr. Samuel Whiskers. In 1993, an animated film adaptation was telecast on the BBC anthology series, The World of Peter Rabbit and Friends with the voices of Rosemary Leach as Tabitha Twitchet, John Gordon Sinclair as John Joiner, Patricia Routledge as Ribby, Struan Rodger as Samuel Whiskers, and Sheila Hancock as Anna Maria.
