= The Tale of Jemima Puddle-Duck =

Children's book by Beatrix Potter

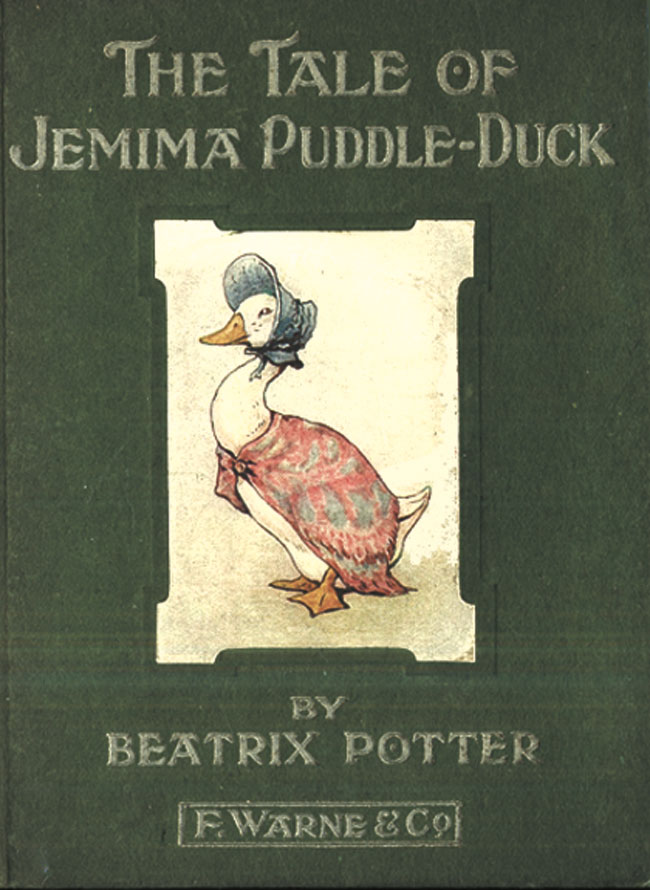
- First edition cover
- Author: Beatrix Potter
- Illustrator: Beatrix Potter
- Language: English
- Genre: Children's literature
- Publisher: Frederick Warne & Co
- Publication date: 1908
- Publication place: England
- Media type: Print (Hardback)
- Preceded by: The Tale of Tom Kitten
- Followed by: The Tale of Samuel Whiskers or The Roly-Poly Pudding

The Tale of Jemima Puddle-Duck is a children's book written and illustrated by Beatrix Potter and first published by Frederick Warne & Co. in 1908. The protagonist, Jemima Puddle-Duck, had already appeared the previous year in The Tale of Tom Kitten.

== Origins ==
The tale is set in Potter's Lake District farm, Hill Top. Her biographer Judy Taylor suggests that a drawing by Beatrix's father, Rupert Potter, of a flying duck wearing a bonnet, may have been a forerunner of Jemima Puddle-Duck, and indeed there is a painting of Jemima flying in a bonnet in the book. One of her early stories, too, a book of fables called The Tale of the Birds and Mr Tod, featured a "vain and foolish" Jemima-like bird.

Jemima makes her first appearance in print in the 1907 book The Tale of Tom Kitten, as a supporting character. The Tale of Jemima Puddle-Duck came out the following year; it was subtitled A Farmyard Tale for Ralph and Betsy [Cannon]. The farm (as opposed to Hill Top, the house that Potter used in numerous tales) was home to her agent John Cannon and his family, with a small herd of cows, thirty sheep, and some pigs, ducks, and chickens. Mrs Cannon was in the habit of getting her chicken "Henny Penny" to sit on duck eggs when the mother, as often happened, was a "bad sitter".

== Plot ==
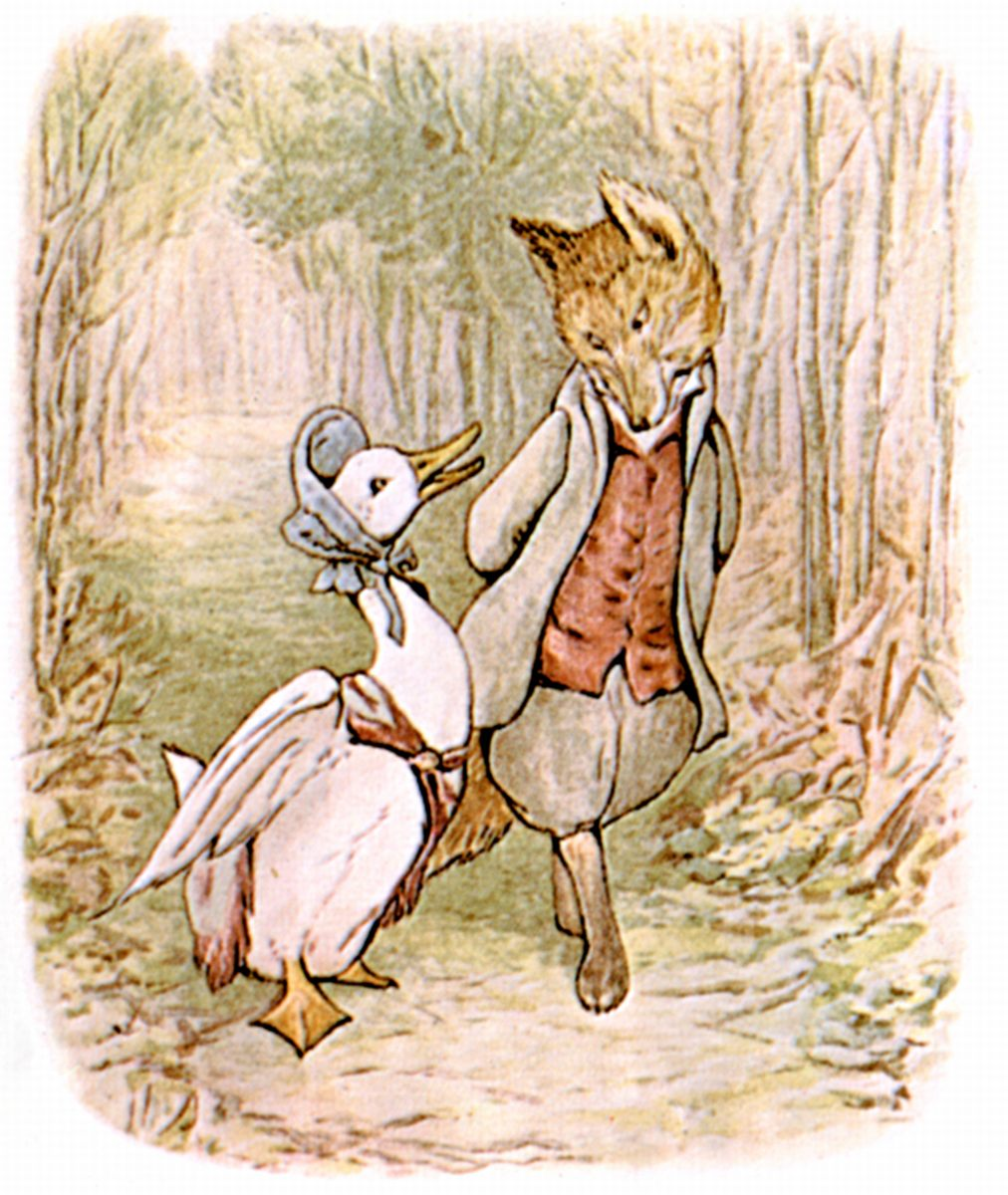
Jemima Puddle-Duck with the gentleman fox

Jemima Puddle-Duck is not allowed to keep the eggs she lays at the farm, so she seeks out a nesting place in the forest. A charming gentleman fox talks her into nesting at his house on a mysteriously ample supply of feathers. He sends the naive Jemima out to collect traditional herbs for stuffing a duck, saying it is for an omelette. The farm collie, Kep, sees through the fox's plan and rescues Jemima. However, two fox hounds eat all of the eggs that Jemima laid at the fox's house. She eventually hatches four ducklings back at the farm.

== Reception ==
Taylor comments that the tale is a cautionary fable warning about going into the unknown. The story's ambiguous elements, such as Jemima's nesting in a pile of feathers, and her obediently collecting sage and onion for the fox to use to make the stuffing to eat when he makes a meal of Jemima, offer a lesson in irony. The book is almost as popular as the first of Potter's "little books", The Tale of Peter Rabbit.

== Adaptations ==
In 1993, an animated film adaptation of the story was featured on the BBC television anthology series, The World of Peter Rabbit and Friends where it was shown along with The Tale of Tom Kitten.

== Sources ==
- Taylor, Judy (1987). Beatrix Potter, 1866-1943. London: Frederick Warne & Co. ISBN 0-7232-3561-9.
