= The Tale of Peter Rabbit =

1901 book by Beatrix Potter

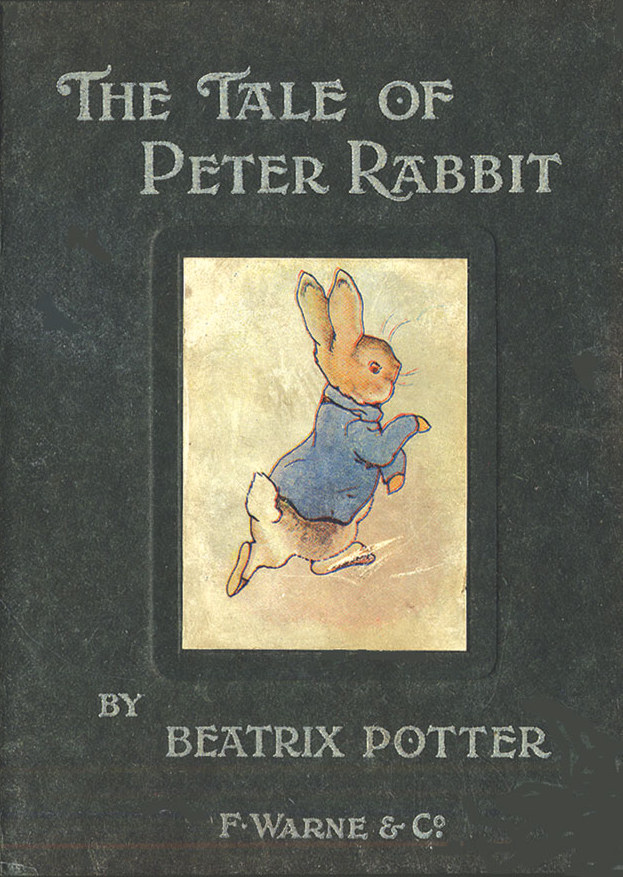
- First edition, October 1902
- Author: Beatrix Potter
- Illustrator: Beatrix Potter
- Language: English
- Genre: Children's literature
- Publisher: Frederick Warne & Co.
- Publication date: October 1902
- Publication place: United Kingdom
- Media type: Print (Hardcover)
- Pages: 56
- OCLC: 12533701
- Followed by: The Tale of Squirrel Nutkin
- Text: The Tale of Peter Rabbit at Wikisource

The Tale of Peter Rabbit is a children's book written and illustrated by Beatrix Potter that follows mischievous and disobedient young Peter Rabbit as he gets into, and is chased around, the garden of Mr. McGregor. He escapes and returns home to his mother, who puts him to bed after offering him chamomile tea. The tale was written for five-year-old Noel Moore, the son of Potter's former governess, Annie Carter Moore, in 1893. It was revised and privately printed by Potter in 1901 after several publishers' rejections, but was printed in a trade edition by Frederick Warne & Co. in 1902. The book was a success, and multiple reprints were issued in the years immediately following its debut. It has been translated into 36 languages, and with 45 million copies sold, it is one of the best-selling books in history.

Since its release, the book has generated considerable merchandise for both children and adults, including toys, dishes, foods, clothing, and videos. Potter was one of the first to be responsible for such merchandise when she patented a Peter Rabbit doll in 1903 and followed it almost immediately with a Peter Rabbit board game. Peter Rabbit has remained popular amongst children for more than a century and continues to be adapted into new book editions, television programmes, and films.

Scholars of literature have commented on themes in the book, such as its radical quality, Peter Rabbit's rebellious nature, and the story's ruthlessness, stating that these offer readers a chance to imagine going to similar extremes.

== Context ==
In 1893, Beatrix Potter heard that the 5-year-old son of a friend, Annie Moore, was convalescing after scarlet fever. Potter decided to entertain the boy, Noel, with an illustrated letter. With her pet rabbit named Peter Piper in mind, she wrote a very short story "about four little rabbits", and illustrated it in the letter. Further letters about other animals followed, until in 1900, Annie Moore proposed to Potter that the illustrated letters could be made into books.

== Plot ==
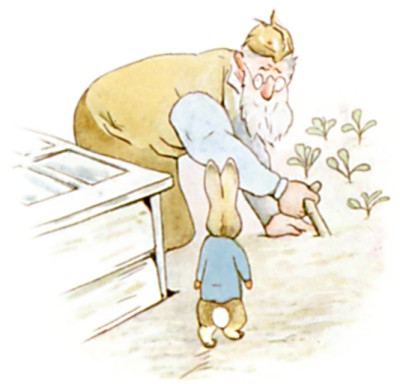
Peter Rabbit, having disobediently entered the garden, meets Mr McGregor

The story focuses on Peter, a young, anthropomorphic rabbit, and his family. Peter's mother, Mrs. Rabbit, intends to go shopping for the day and allows Peter and her other three children, Peter's sisters: Flopsy, Mopsy, and Cotton-tail to go playing. She tells them they can go anywhere they like, but not to enter the vegetable garden of an old man named Mr. McGregor, whose wife, Mrs. McGregor, put their father in a pie after he entered and got caught by Mr. McGregor. Peter's three younger sisters obediently stay away from Mr. McGregor's garden, choosing to go down the lane and gather blackberries, but Peter enters Mr. McGregor's garden in the hopes of eating some vegetables.

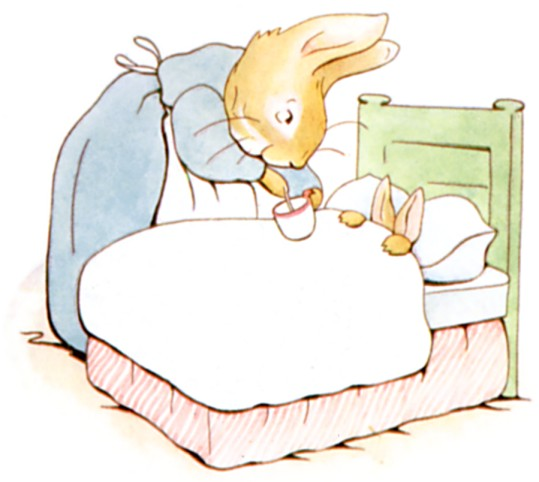
Mrs. Rabbit puts Peter to bed, and gives him chamomile tea to treat his stomachache

Peter eats more than is good for him and goes looking for parsley to cure his stomach ache. Peter is seen by Mr. McGregor, who chases Peter. Peter gets caught in a net and three friendly sparrows comfort him. Peter manages to escape Mr. McGregor just in time, but loses his blue jacket and shoes while running off. He hides in a greenhouse, ultimately jumping into a watering can for protection. Unfortunately there is water inside the watering can so Peter gets wet and sneezes, alerting Mr. McGregor. When Mr. McGregor gets tired running after Peter and resumes his work, Peter tries to escape, but is completely lost in the huge garden. Peter tries getting a young mouse to help him, however she is collecting food for her family and cannot help. Peter also notices a cat sitting by a pond. Peter considers asking for directions, but ultimately decides not to, having been warned about cats by his cousin. However, Peter sees that Mr. McGregor is "gone" and it buys him some time to escape to the gate. Peter sees from a distance the gate where he entered the garden and heads for it, despite being noticed and chased by Mr. McGregor again. With difficulty, he wriggles under the gate, and escapes from the garden. His abandoned clothing is used by Mr. McGregor to dress a scarecrow.

After returning home late, a sick Peter is reprimanded by his mother for losing his shoes and blue jacket (the second jacket and shoes he has lost in a fortnight). Peter's mother puts him to bed early without supper. To treat his stomachache, Mrs. Rabbit gives Peter a teaspoon of chamomile tea. Flopsy, Mopsy, and Cottontail, meanwhile, enjoy a delicious dinner of milk, bread and blackberries.

== Characters ==
- Peter: Peter is a naughty rabbit who disobeys his mother. (He is the eldest of the four little rabbits.)
- Flopsy: Flopsy is Peter's sister who is a good rabbit. (She is the second youngest of the four siblings.)
- Mopsy: Mopsy is a rabbit and Peter's sister who always obeys her mother. (She is the second oldest of the four.)
- Cotton-tail: Cotton-tail is a sweet rabbit and Peter's sister. As her name says, she is soft as cotton. (She is the youngest of the four.)
- Mr. McGregor: Mr. McGregor owns a beautiful garden that is filled with delicious fruits and vegetables. Peter's father was put into a pie by Mrs. McGregor.

== Publication history ==
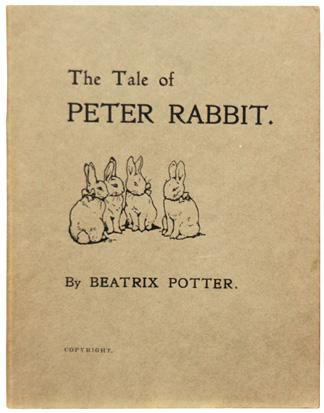
Cover of the first edition, privately published in 1901 with monochrome illustrations

The Tale of Peter Rabbit was first published in December 1901 in a print run of 250; Potter published it herself after six publishers had declined the manuscript. It had Potter's monochrome illustrations. The demand was greater and she needed to print 200 more. Frederick Warne published the first full-colour edition in 1902. The blocks for the illustrations and text were sent to the printer Edmund Evans for engraving, and Potter adjusted the page proofs. The book was soon on sale in shops in London, including Harrods department store, accompanied by the world's first licensed character, a soft toy of Peter Rabbit. By December 1903 the book had sold 50,000 copies. The book's success prompted Warne to obtain more stories from Potter, starting in 1903 with both The Tailor of Gloucester and The Tale of Squirrel Nutkin.

The book has since been reprinted many times, and after 100 years had never gone out of print. Warne did not copyright the book when it was published in the United States; unlicensed editions of the book were produced, the first published by Henry Altemus Company in 1904. The book has been translated into 36 languages. Over 45 million copies have been sold, making it one of the best-selling books in history.

== Reception ==
Scholars have identified a variety of themes in The Tale of Peter Rabbit. Eliza Dresang suggests that the book is "radical" in multiple ways. The first of these is its child-centred size, easy to hold. It is radical, too, in its nonlinear quality, with the images not immediately beside the text they illustrate (and sometimes before that text), and with sentences that often start with the result, and end with the actor, as in "But round the end of a cucumber frame, whom should he meet but Mr. McGregor!" The meaning, too, has more than one layer, not least in the dressed animals, which are at once experienced by the reader as animals and as humans. And the book's start, with the death of Peter Rabbit's father, is a radical innovation for a book for small children.

Katie Mullins describes Peter's rebellious nature, which is seen in the book's first dialogue, when Mrs. Rabbit forbids Peter to go into Mr. McGregor's garden. Mullins comments that the garden is stated to be dangerous, as it is where Peter's father met his death. She cites Maria Nikolajeva and Carole Scott's description of Peter as a "naughty boy who values his independence and whose desire to transgress boundaries far outweighs his mother's warnings or his personal safety".

Judith Robertson and colleagues examine the element of ruthlessness in the story. In their view, Peter Rabbit's qualities such as ruthlessness and defiance allow Potter to speak of her own self-knowledge; this serves both as an outlet for a woman in the strict Victorian era, and as a place for her young readers to imagine going to similar extremes.

School Library Journal included the book at #19 on their Top 100 Picture Books list in 2012.

== Adaptations ==
=== Merchandising ===
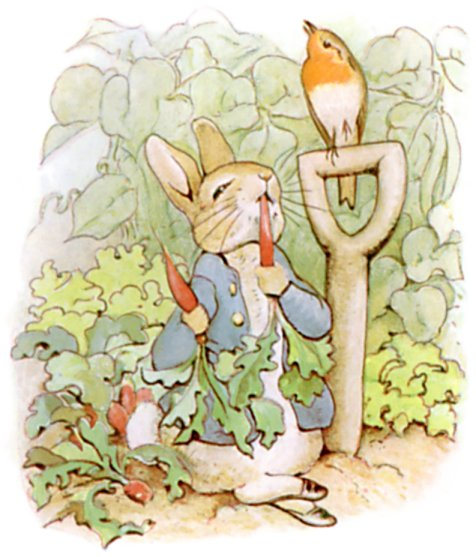
Peter Rabbit feasts in the forbidden garden

Potter asserted her tales would one day be nursery classics, and part of the "longevity of her books comes from strategy", writes Potter biographer Ruth MacDonald. She was the first to exploit the commercial possibilities of her characters and tales; between 1903 and 1905 these included a Peter Rabbit stuffed toy, an unpublished board game, and nursery wallpaper.

=== Book ===
The scholar Margaret Mackey writes that Warne was still attempting to prevent other publishers from printing The Tale of Peter Rabbit in 1993, despite the failure to protect the copyright 90 years earlier. In her view "the battle has clearly been lost", as multiple editions and formats exist in North America, and some "even in Britain" where the book was still protected at that time. Some use both Potter's words and her illustrations, though sometimes too small to read. Warne itself has issued a large-format book, The Complete Adventures of Peter Rabbit, printing several of the original pages "as panels on a larger page". Mackey comments that this at once loses the subtlety of the original's layout and book design. In 1989, Warne further printed Scenes from The Tale of Peter Rabbit with "five three-dimensional cut-out pictures from the book, tagged with quotations from the story." Among the seemingly-pirated editions, one by Ottenheimer Publishers in 1993 printed only a selection of the illustrations with the text, with larger but fewer pages. In Mackey's view, "this version is simply an example of diminishment and loss", as the rhythm of the original is dislocated. Other editions dispense with Potter's text altogether, using a selection of her illustrations. One such is Warne's Meet Peter Rabbit, a board book for babies with five pictures inside and one on the front cover, along with Beatrix Potter's name. The text "barely mention[s] Mr. McGregor."

=== Film ===
In 1938, shortly after the success of Snow White and the Seven Dwarfs, Walt Disney became interested in making an animated film based on The Tale of Peter Rabbit. However, in a letter to a friend, Potter wrote that she refused Walt Disney's "scheme to film Peter Rabbit", saying, "I am not very hopeful about the result. They propose to use cartoons; it seems that a succession of figures can be joggled together to give an impression of motion. I don't think the pictures would be satisfactory... I am not troubling myself about it!"

In 1935, the story was loosely adapted in the Merrie Melodies short film, Country Boy. It shows some modifications in relation to Beatrix Potter's original story, most notably the Rabbit family surname is changed to "Cottontail" and Peter having two brothers and a sister rather than three sisters. In 1971, Peter Rabbit appeared as a character in the ballet film The Tales of Beatrix Potter. In late 1991, HBO aired an animated musical adaptation of The Tale of Peter Rabbit, narrated by Carol Burnett, as part of the network's Storybook Musicals series, which was later released to VHS by Family Home Entertainment under HBO licence. In 1992, the tale was adapted to animation again for the BBC anthology series, The World of Peter Rabbit and Friends, along with The Tale of Benjamin Bunny. In 2006, Peter Rabbit was heavily referenced in a biopic about Beatrix Potter entitled Miss Potter. In December 2012, a new animated children's TV series titled Peter Rabbit premiered on Nickelodeon, with a full series run beginning in February 2013.

In February 2018, a live-action/animated feature film titled Peter Rabbit, directed by Will Gluck, was released. Voice roles were played by James Corden, Daisy Ridley, Margot Robbie, and Elizabeth Debicki, and live action roles played by Domhnall Gleeson, Rose Byrne, and Sam Neill. A sequel was released in 2021.
