= The Tale of Timmy Tiptoes =

Children's book by Beatrix Potter

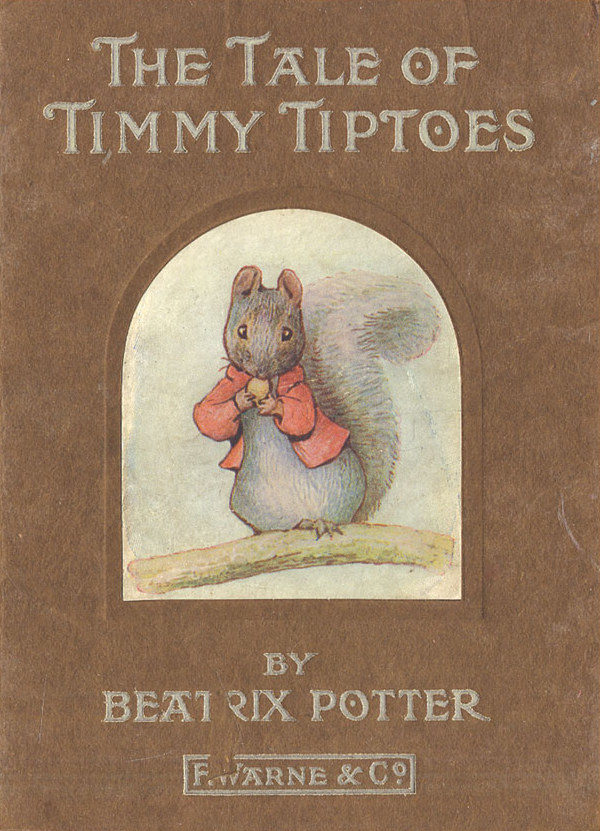
- 1st edition cover.
- Author: Beatrix Potter
- Illustrator: Beatrix Potter
- Language: English
- Genre: Children's literature
- Publisher: Frederick Warne & Co.
- Publication date: 1911
- Publication place: United Kingdom
- Media type: Print (hardcover)
- Preceded by: The Tale of Mrs. Tittlemouse
- Followed by: The Tale of Mr. Tod
- Text: The Tale of Timmy Tiptoes at Wikisource

The Tale of Timmy Tiptoes is a children's book written and illustrated by Beatrix Potter, and published by Frederick Warne & Co. in October 1911. Timmy Tiptoes is a squirrel believed to be a nut-thief by his fellows, and imprisoned by them in a hollow tree with the expectation that he will confess under confinement. Timmy is tended by Chippy Hackee, a friendly, mischievous chipmunk who has run away from his wife and is camping-out in the tree. Chippy urges the prisoner to eat the nuts stored in the tree, and Timmy does so but grows so fat he cannot escape the tree. He regains his freedom when a storm topples part of the tree. The tale contrasts the harmonious marriage of its title character with the less than harmonious marriage of the chipmunk.

The book sold well at release, but is now considered one of Potter's weakest productions. Potter never observed the tale's indigenous North American mammals in nature, and, as a result, her depictions are thought stiff and unnatural. Other elements in the story have come under fire: the rhymes, for example, reveal nothing about the characters nor do they provide an amusing game for the child reader in the manner of the rhymes in The Tale of Squirrel Nutkin. The storm in the finale is viewed as a weak plot device introduced solely to hurry the tale to its conclusion, and the marriage of the chipmunks has been described as "abrasive and shocking" and an impediment to the flow of the tale.

The tale's disappointing qualities have been ascribed to Potter's growing lack of interest in writing for children, to pressure from her publisher for yet another book, and to Potter's desire to exploit the lucrative American market. Potter's artistically successful books were written for specific children; Timmy Tiptoes however was composed for Potter's amorphous, ill-defined American fanbase. By 1911, the demands of her aging parents and the business operations at her working farm, Hill Top, occupied much of Potter's time and attention to the exclusion of nearly everything else, and are accounted as some of the reasons for the author's declining artistry and her lack of interest in producing children's books.

Characters from the tale have been reproduced as porcelain figurines, enamelled boxes, music boxes, and various ornaments by Beswick Pottery, Crummles, Schmid, and ANRI.

== Background ==
Helen Beatrix Potter was born on July 28, 1866, to barrister Rupert William Potter and his wife Helen (Leech) Potter in London. She was educated by governesses and tutors, and passed a quiet childhood reading, painting, drawing, tending a nursery menagerie of small animals, and visiting museums and art exhibitions. Her interests in the natural world and country life were nurtured with holidays in Scotland, the Lake District, and Camfield Place, the Hertfordshire home of her paternal grandparents.

Potter's adolescence was as quiet as her childhood. She matured into a spinsterish young woman whose parents groomed her to be a permanent resident and housekeeper in their home. She continued to paint and draw, and experienced her first professional artistic success in 1890 when she sold six designs of humanized animals to a greeting card publisher. She hoped to lead a useful life independent of her parents, and tentatively considered a career in mycology, but the all-male scientific community regarded her as nothing more than an amateur and she abandoned fungi.

In 1900, Potter revised a tale about a humanized rabbit she had written for a child friend in 1893, fashioned a dummy book of it in imitation of Helen Bannerman's 1899 bestseller The Story of Little Black Sambo, and privately published her tale for family and friends in December 1901 after several publishers' rejections. Frederick Warne & Co. had earlier rejected the tale, but, eager to compete in the lucrative small format children's book market, reconsidered and accepted the "bunny book" (as the firm called it) on the recommendation of their prominent children's book artist L. Leslie Brooke. Potter agreed to colour the pen and ink illustrations of her privately printed edition, chose the then-new Hentschel three-colour process for reproducing her watercolours, and in October 1902 The Tale of Peter Rabbit was released.

Potter continued to publish with Warnes, and, in August 1905, used sales profits and a small legacy from an aunt to buy Hill Top, a working farm of 34 acres (13.85 ha) at Sawrey in the Lake District. In the years immediately following its purchase, she produced tales and illustrations inspired by the farm, its woodland surroundings, and nearby villages.

Potter produced two books per annum for Warne, but by 1910 she was juggling the demands of aging parents with the business of operating Hill Top, and her literary and artistic productivity began to decline. The Tale of Mrs. Tittlemouse was the only book Potter published in 1910. She wrote a friend on New Year's Day 1911: "I did not succeed in finishing more than one book last year ... I find it very difficult lately to get the drawings done. I do not seem to be able to go into the country for a long enough time to do a sufficient amount of sketching and when I was at Bowness last summer I spent most of my time upon the road going backwards & forwards to the farm – which was amusing, but not satisfactory for work."

She intended to follow Mrs. Tittlemouse with a tale about a pig in a large format book similar to the original Ginger and Pickles, but was forced to abandon the project after several unproductive attempts at composition. Instead, she occupied the winter of 1910–11 with supervising the production of Peter Rabbit's Painting Book, and composing Timmy Tiptoes, a tale about indigenous North American mammals.

== Production ==
Potter completed the text of Timmy Tiptoes but decided it was too long. She was also uncertain exactly how to put the bird calls into print. She revised the text, and wrote publisher Harold Warne: "I have compressed the words in the earlier pages, but it seems unavoidable to have a good deal of nuts. The songs of the little birds will be easier to judge as to spelling when one sees it in type." The illustrations presented another problem. For her earlier productions, Potter was able to observe the species concerned in the wild, and kept specimens at home as pets and models. For Timmy Tiptoes however, she was unable to do so. Instead, she relied on specimens in the London Zoological Gardens as models, and checked photographs in reference books including one from the firm of taxidermist Rowland Ward. "The book obtained from Rowland Ward will be very useful," she wrote.

At the end of July 1911, she sent the text and most of the illustrations to Warne from Lindeth Howe, (now a 4 star hotel) her parents' summering place in Windermere. An embarrassed Harold Warne wrote her suggesting a few minor alterations, but she was unperturbed. "There is no need to apologize for criticism," she wrote, "But there is no doubt the animals strongly resemble rabbits, the head which you question was copied from a photograph in the book." The Tale of Timmy Tiptoes was released in October 1911 to popular and commercial success.

In Beatrix Potter: A Life in Nature (2007), biographer Linda Lear describes Timmy Tiptoes as "the least satisfactory" of Potter's books, and ascribes its literary and artistic shortcomings to the author's desire to satisfy her publisher's demand for yet another book, to court her American fans with a tale about North American animals, and to make quick money in the American market. Potter's output decreased strikingly after Timmy Tiptoes and the length of time between books increased. Two books that followed Timmy Tiptoes, The Tale of Mr. Tod (1912) and The Tale of Pigling Bland (1913), have been described as the culmination of Potter's well-structured, imaginative art rather than a continuation of that art.

Potter had become tired of writing for children and increasingly unfamiliar with them. The Moore children (for whom she had written several tales early in her career) were grown, and Potter had not replaced them with other children, although she continued to write letters to child fans who had written her. She was out of touch with the interests of American children. Her marriage to William Heelis on October 15, 1913, effectively ended her literary and artistic career. Although she published sporadically in the years following her marriage, her works depended principally upon decades-old concepts filed away in her publisher's offices and ageing illustrations tucked away in her portfolio. Only The Tale of Johnny Town-Mouse (1918) brought forth a completely new set of illustrations from the artist. She devoted herself to marriage and farming, and avoided publicity and fans.

== Plot ==
The tale is set in a forest and begins with "once upon a time". Timmy Tiptoes is "a little fat comfortable grey squirrel" living in a nest thatched with leaves in the top of a tall tree with his little wife, Goody. Over the course of several days, the two collect nuts in their little sacks for the coming winter and spring, and store the nuts in hollow tree stumps near their home. Timmy wears a red jacket he removes while working, and his wife wears a pink dress and apron. When the stumps are full, the couple make use of a tree-hole that once belonged to a woodpecker. The nuts rattle "down – down – down inside", and Goody wonders how they will ever retrieve them. Timmy reminds her he will be much thinner by springtime and will be able to pass through the little hole.

In an aside, the narrator tells the reader that the couple had great quantities of nuts because they never lost them, noting that most squirrels lose half their nuts because they cannot remember where they buried them. Silvertail is the most forgetful of squirrels in the wood, and, while trying to find his nuts, digs up another squirrel's hoard. A commotion erupts among the nutting squirrels, and, as ill luck would have it, a flock of birds fly by singing "Who's bin [sic] digging-up my nuts?" and "Little bit-a-bread and-no-cheese!" One bird finds a perch in the bush where Timmy is working and continues to sing about digging up nuts. The other squirrels take notice, suspect Timmy of robbing others of their hoards, rush upon him, scratch and cuff him, chase him up a tree, and stuff him with great difficulty through the woodpecker's hole. Silvertail suggests they leave him there until he confesses.

Timmy lays "stunned and still" on the peck of nuts he has stored in the hollow tree while Goody searches fruitlessly for him. Eventually, Timmy stirs and discovers himself in a mossy little bed surrounded by ample provisions. Chippy Hackee, a small striped chipmunk, tends him with kindness, mentioning that it has been raining nuts through the top of tree and he has also "found a few buried". The chipmunk coaxes Timmy to eat the nuts and Timmy grows "fatter and fatter!"

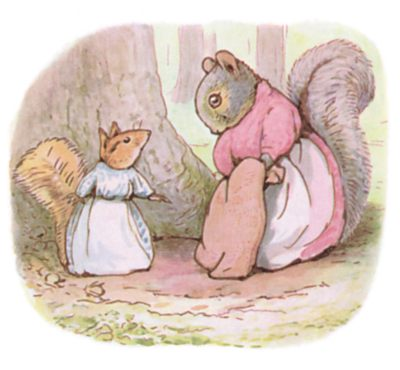
Illustration of Mrs. Chippy Hackee and Goody Tiptoes

Goody is very concerned about her husband's disappearance, but has gone back to work collecting nuts and hiding them under a tree root. Mrs. Hackee, Chippy's wife, emerges from beneath the root to demand an explanation regarding the shower of nuts into her home. Eventually, the two ladies complain about their runaway husbands, but the chipmunk knows where her husband is camping-out because a little bird has told her. Together, they hurry to the woodpecker's hole and hear their husbands deep within the tree singing:

"My little old man and I fell out,
How shall we bring this matter about?
Bring it about as well as you can,
And get you gone, you little old man!"

Mrs. Hackee refuses to enter the tree because her husband bites, but Goody calls to her husband and he comes to the hole with a kiss for her. He is too fat to squeeze through the hole, but Chippy Hackee (who is not too fat) refuses to leave and remains below chuckling. A fortnight later, a big wind blows off the top of the tree, and Timmy makes his escape. He hurries home through the rain, huddling under an umbrella with his wife.

Chippy Hackee continues to camp-out in the tree stump for another week, but a bear comes lumbering through the neighbourhood (looking for nuts perhaps?) and Chippy decides it's time to hurry home. He suffers a cold in his head and is quite uncomfortable. Timmy now keeps the family nuts "fastened up with a little padlock", and Goody is seen in the accompanying illustration sitting outside the nest tending three tiny babies. "And whenever that little bird sees the Chipmunks, he sings – 'Who's-been-digging-up my-nuts? Who's been digging-up my-nuts?' But nobody ever answers!" Chippy Hackee and his wife are seen in the last illustration trying to drive the little bird away with their tree-leaf umbrella.

Potter's idea to make the squirrel grow so fat he cannot escape the tree was imitated by A. A. Milne in Winnie the Pooh.

== Illustrations ==
Anne Stevenson Hobbs in Beatrix Potter's Art (1989) asserts "Minute subjects demanded minute strokes: with Bewick, William Hunt, and Birket Foster, [Potter] is a descendant of the pictures 'in little' approach of the Elizabethans." In addition to the miniaturists, Potter once admitted that the Pre-Raphaelites, with their "somewhat niggling but absolutely genuine admiration for copying natural detail", had influenced her style.

Timmy Tiptoes is unique amongst Potter's children's books: it is the only one depicting American mammals. The title character is an eastern grey squirrel, a species exported from America to Britain, and flourishing there around 1900. It was unlikely Potter saw the animals in the woods around Hill Top as they had yet to become established in the Lake District. She probably relied for models on specimens in the Small Mammal House of a zoo, and consulted reference works in the library of the Natural History Museum to aid her work.

Potter either had no live models for the eastern chipmunk characters, or borrowed a pet chipmunk from a cousin. Initially, she may have been unsure of how to draw the chipmunks and chose to clothe them, then was forced to follow suit and clothe the two main players as well, while leaving the other squirrels in their natural state. Or, she may have clothed Timmy and Goody because they collect their nuts in sacks (an unnatural way for squirrels to behave) in imitation of a ruse she employed in Peter Rabbit when Peter only walks on his hind legs while wearing his blue jacket. When he loses his jacket, he reverts to being an animal and moves about on all fours. Because Timmy and Chippy were not drawn from nature, the two suggest stuffed animals in their lack of engaging facial expressions.

Potter probably modelled the American black bear on a specimen in the London Zoological Gardens in Regent's Park. She wrote in her manuscript in reference to her drawing of the bear: "Intended to represent the American black bear, it has a smooth coat, like a sealskin coat." Kutzer suggests the bear in Potter's two illustrations of the animal would theoretically be recognized by American children, but the depiction of the bear is almost as stiff and unnatural as Potter's depictions of humans in her other books. The bear lacks any of the species' "clumsy gracefulness", she argues, which Potter could only have realized after seeing bears in the wild – an opportunity that simply did not exist for her in England. The inclusion of an American black bear-looking creature in the tale and its depiction in the illustrations only emphasize Potter's awkward struggle with subject matter she had not directly observed in nature or of which she had little knowledge.

MacDonald points out that the forest backgrounds were imagined and not drawn from nature; they thus lack the "infusions of warmth [and] character" that distinguish the books that were drawn and painted from the Sawrey woodlands. She concludes that it was impossible for Potter to clearly write about or draw her subjects without some sort of inspiration close at hand. Judy Taylor and her collaborators on Beatrix Potter 1866-1943: The Artist and Her World conclude that Timmy Tiptoes is "an uneasy book" and one in which the animals do not fit naturally into the background.

== Scholarly commentaries ==
Ruth K. MacDonald, Professor of English at New Mexico State University and author of Beatrix Potter (1986), observes that the depiction of domestic discord in Timmy Tiptoes is not typical for Potter or for children's literature of the period. She considers the marital relationship between the chipmunks "abrasive and shocking". Though their relationship may reflect the non-monogamous mating habits of eastern chipmunks and offer a contrast with the happy pairing of Timmy and Goody, it is an obstacle in the flow of the tale. The reader is forced to turn his attention from the star of the book to a secondary player, and, while Timmy's story ends with the hero happily reunited with his wife, the reunion dealt the chipmunks is uncertain and less satisfying than that granted Timmy and Goody.

The reader is forced to question the stability of the Hackee union: Chippy stays away from home long after Timmy's situation is resolved and returns to his wife only after being frightened from the tree by a bear entirely superfluous to the tale. At home, Chippy suffers with a head cold, but Mrs. Hackee's lack of expression in the illustration leaves the reader wondering how she took his abrupt return. One wonders why Mrs. Hackee did not pursue Chippy once she learned of his whereabouts from a bird. After the reader discovers Goody is the happy mother of triplets and Timmy has made the decision to keep his nuts under lock and key, he may wonder what sort of fate the future holds for the Hackees.

MacDonald observes that the dedication, "For Many Unknown Little Friends, Including Monica", is evidence that Potter's audience for Timmy Tiptoes was not as clearly defined as the audiences for her other books, especially those books composed for very specific children. Though "Monica" suggests a particular child of Potter's acquaintance, Monica was simply one of many children who posted fan letters to the author. "I do not know the child," Potter wrote, "She is the school friend of a little cousin, who asked for it as a favour, and the name took my fancy." MacDonald suggests it was this lack of a clearly defined audience that led to Potter's lack of imagination and control in the tale, and her "false step" with the chipmunks' marital relationship.

M. Daphne Kutzer, Professor of English at the State University of New York at Plattsburgh and author of Beatrix Potter: Writing in Code (2003), detects some similarities to The Tale of Squirrel Nutkin (1903). Both tales have touches of the pourquoi story in their explanations of why squirrels collect nuts, and both incorporate rhymes and riddles in their narratives. However, there is a crucial difference that diminishes the artistry of Timmy Tiptoes: the rhymes and riddles in Squirrel Nutkin shed light on Nutkin's character and create a guessing game for the reader while those in Timmy Tiptoes are bland devices that simply move the characters to reunions with their wives and the tale to its conclusion.

Kutzer points out Timmy and his wife wear clothes, but the other squirrels and the bear do not. There is no apparent reason for this differentiation. She admits that this may be Potter's attempt to separate her anthropomorphized animals from her natural ones, but she believes the attempt fails on both narrative and artistic grounds. Logically, she argues, all the squirrels should wear (or not wear) clothes because they all live and behave in a natural manner: Timmy and Goody inhabit a nest in a tree (not a comfortable little house somewhere), and all the squirrels gather nuts for the coming winter. Except for Timmy having a wife, there is no clear distinction between natural and personified squirrel nature. In another stumbling block to logic, Timmy's red jacket appears then disappears then reappears in the illustrations with no basis either in the plot or Timmy's character, but apparently in Potter's personal need for a splash of colour here and there. In this case, Potter has allowed an external force to shape the tale rather than letting the tale find its own shape.

== Merchandise ==
Potter confidently asserted her tales would one day be nursery classics, and part of the process in making them so was marketing strategy. She was the first to exploit the commercial possibilities of her characters and tales with a Peter Rabbit doll, an unpublished Peter Rabbit board game, and a Peter Rabbit nursery wallpaper between 1903 and 1905. Similar "side-shows" (as she termed the spinoffs) were produced over the next two decades.

In 1947, Frederick Warne & Co. granted Beswick Pottery of Longton, Staffordshire rights and licences to produce the Potter characters in porcelain. In 1948, Timmy Tiptoes became one of the first ten figurines, and was followed by Goody Tiptoes in 1961, Chippy Hackee in 1979, and Timmy and Goody under an umbrella in 1986.

In 1973, The Eden Toy Company of New York City became the first and only American company to be granted licensing rights from Warne to manufacture stuffed Potter characters in plush. In 1975, Timmy Tiptoes and Goody Tiptoes were released. In 1975, Crummles of Poole, Dorset began manufacturing enamelled boxes depicting Potter characters on their lids, and eventually produced a 1 and 5/8 inch diameter Timmy Tiptoes box.

In 1977, Schmid & Co. of Toronto and Randolph, Massachusetts, were granted licensing rights to Beatrix Potter, and produced a Goody Tiptoes music box, a Chippy Hackee music box playing "Feed the Birds", and a "Baby's First Christmas" ornament depicting Goody cuddling one of her babies. In the middle 1980s, the Italian firm of ANRI manufactured ornaments and figurines of Timmy Tiptoes composed of a synthetic substance called Toriart.

== Reprints and translations ==
As of 2010, all of Potter's 23 small format books were still in print and available in a 400-page omnibus edition, and in complete sets in presentation boxes. Timmy Tiptoes is available in paperback, board book, a Kindle edition, an Audible Audio edition, and an audiocassette format. First editions and reprints were available through antiquarian booksellers.

The English language editions of Potter's little books still bore the Frederick Warne imprint in 2010 though the company was bought by Penguin Books in 1983. The printing plates were remade by Penguin from new photographs of the original drawings in 1985, and all 23 volumes released in 1987 as The Original and Authorized Edition.

Potter's small format books have been translated into nearly thirty languages including Greek and Russian. The Tale of Timmy Tiptoes was published in the Initial Teaching Alphabet in 1966 and in Dutch as Het Verhaal van Timmie Tuimelaar in 1968 under licence to Uitgeverij Ploegsma, Amsterdam. The tale was published in Spanish by Grange Books in 1997, and a German Thesaurus edition intended for German ESL and English GSL students in 2009. The Thesaurus edition was printed in English with translations of difficult or unusual words and expressions located in footnotes. In 1986, MacDonald observed that the Potter books had become a traditional part of childhood in both English-speaking lands and those in which the books had been translated.
