= Three Blind Mice =

English nursery rhyme

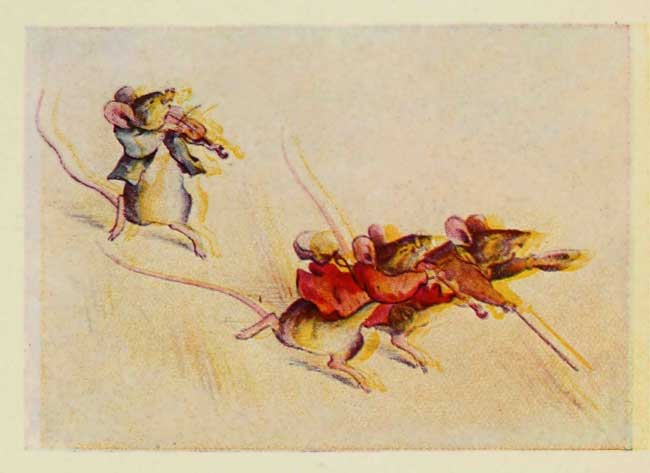
- Illustration of "Three Blind Mice" by Beatrix Potter in Cecily Parsley's Nursery Rhymes (1922)

Nursery rhyme
- Published: c. 1609
- Songwriter: Unknown

"Three Blind Mice" is an English nursery rhyme and musical round. It has a Roud Folk Song Index number of 3753.

== Words ==
Three Blind Mice melody
Tune for "Three Blind Mice".

Three Blind Mice round
"Three Blind Mice" round.

The rhyme has a number of variants. This 1922 version is from Cecily Parsley's Nursery Rhymes by Beatrix Potter:

Three blind mice, three blind mice,
See how they run!
They all run after the farmer's wife,
And she cut off their tails with a carving knife,
Did you ever see such a thing in your life
As three blind mice!

== Origins and meaning ==
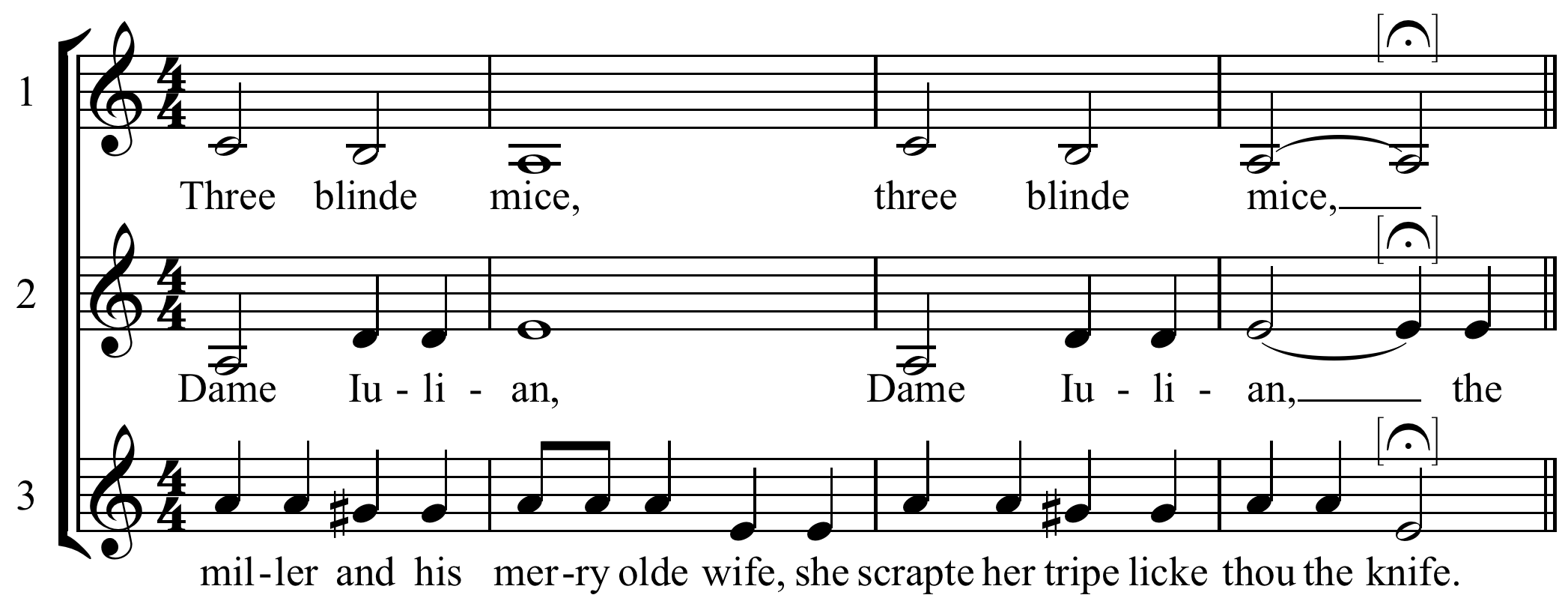
"Three Blinde Mice" (1609).

A version of this rhyme, together with music (in a minor key), was published in Deuteromelia or The Seconde part of Musicks melodie (1609). The editor of the book, and possible author of the rhyme, was Thomas Ravenscroft. The original lyrics are:

Three Blinde Mice,
Three Blinde Mice,
Dame Iulian,
Dame Iulian,
the Miller and his merry olde Wife,
shee scrapte her tripe licke thou the knife.

Attempts to read historical significance into the words have led to the speculation that this musical round was written earlier and refers to Queen Mary I of England blinding and executing three Protestant bishops. However, the Oxford Martyrs, Ridley, Latimer and Cranmer, were burned at the stake, not blinded, although if the rhyme was made by crypto-Catholics, the mice's "blindness" could refer to their Protestantism. However, as can be seen above, the earliest lyrics don't talk about harming the three blind mice, and the first known date of publication is 1609, well after Queen Mary died.

The rhyme entered children's literature only in 1842 when it was published in a collection by James Orchard Halliwell.

== Variations ==
Amateur music composer Thomas Oliphant (1799–1873) noted in 1843 that:

This absurd old round is frequently brought to mind in the present day, from the circumstance of there being an instrumental Quartet by Weiss, through which runs a musical phrase accidentally the same as the notes applied to the word Three Blind Mice. They form a third descending, C, B, A.

Robert Schumann's Kreisleriana #7, which is arguably about a cat (Murr), appears to be based upon "Three Blind Mice", but in a predominantly minor key. "Three Blind Mice" is to be found in the fugue which is the centerpiece of #7.

Joseph Holbrooke (1878–1958) composed his Symphonic Variations, opus 37, based on Three Blind Mice. Joseph Haydn used its theme in the Finale (4th Mvt) of his Symphony 83 (La Poule) (1785–86); one of the 6 Paris Symphonies, and the music also appears in the final movement of English composer Eric Coates' suite The Three Men. "Three Blind Mice" was used as a theme song for The Three Stooges and a Curtis Fuller arrangement of the rhyme is featured on the Art Blakey live album of the same name. The song is also the basis for Leroy Anderson's 1947 orchestral "Fiddle Faddle".

The theme can be heard in Antonín Dvořák's Symphony No. 9 IV. Allegro con fuoco and Manuel de Falla's El Paño Moruno.

The British composer Havergal Brian (1876–1972) used the tune as the basis of his orchestral work "Fantastic Variations on an Old Rhyme" (1907–08). The work was originally intended as the first movement of a satirical "Fantastic Symphony" (Symphony No.1), a programmatic work, based on the nursery rhyme. The second movement was intended as a scherzo for pizzicato strings, depicting the souls of the departed mice going to heaven and the third movement was a Lament for the dead mice. Both these movements are lost. "Festal Dance" (1908) formed the finale, depicting the wild dance of triumph of the farmer's wife in which passing references to the tune can be heard. Having been performed separately, the first and last movements became independent works around 1914.

The theme of the second movement of Sergei Rachmaninoff's Piano Concerto No. 4 (1926, revised 1928 and 1941) was criticized as resembling Three Blind Mice.

A calypso version of the tune with new lyrics by Monty Norman was recorded by Byron Lee and the Dragonaires for the film Dr. No, and is featured in its soundtrack as part of the track "Kingston Calypso". The reworked rhyme alludes to the three black assassins whose deadly march through the streets of Kingston, Jamaica opens the film. Other Jamaican versions include dancehall artists, like Josey Wales and Brigadier Jerry.

=== "Complete version" ===
Published in 1904 by Frederick Warne & Co. in London, an illustrated children's book by John W. Ivimey entitled The Complete Version of Ye Three Blind Mice, fleshes the mice out into mischievous characters who seek adventure, eventually being taken in by a farmer whose wife chases them from the house and into a bramble bush, which blinds them. Soon after, their tails are removed by "the butcher's wife" when the complete version incorporates the original verse—although the earliest version from 1609 does not mention tails being cut off. The story ends with them using a tonic to grow new tails and recover their eyesight, learning a trade (making wood chips, according to the accompanying illustration), buying a house and living happily ever after.

== North American sports usage ==
In some North American sports such as baseball and ice hockey, the tune is associated with umpires and referees, especially after making a call perceived to be poor or contentious. An organist or DJ playing the tune at a sporting event can even face sanctions for playing the tune. In 2012, intern Derek Dye was ejected by the umpire from a Daytona Cubs baseball game for playing an organ rendition of the song over the PA system as manager Brian Harper was coming out of the dugout to argue a close play at first base.

== In popular culture ==
The animated short Three Blind Mouseketeers includes a version of the three blind mice combined with the titular characters of the novel The Three Musketeers.

== See also ==
- List of nursery rhymes
- The Mousetrap
