= Cecily Parsley's Nursery Rhymes =

Children's book by Beatrix Potter

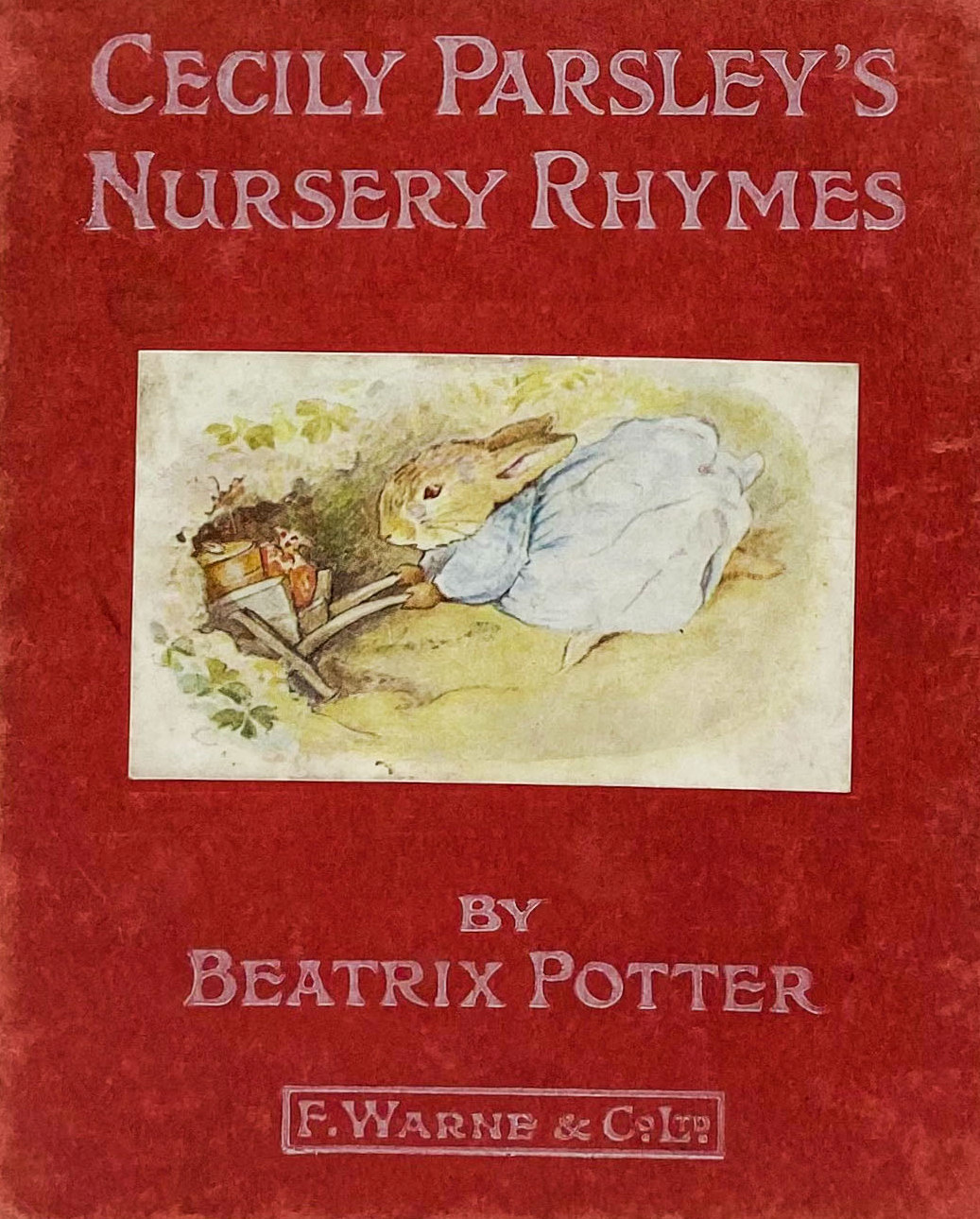
- First edition cover
- Author: Beatrix Potter
- Illustrator: Beatrix Potter
- Language: English
- Genre: Children's literature
- Publisher: Frederick Warne & Co.
- Publication date: December 1922
- Publication place: England
- Media type: Print (Hardcover)
- Preceded by: The Tale of Johnny Town-Mouse
- Followed by: The Tale of Little Pig Robinson
- Text: Cecily Parsley's Nursery Rhymes at Wikisource

Cecily Parsley's Nursery Rhymes is a children's book written and illustrated by Beatrix Potter, and published by Frederick Warne & Co. in December 1922. The book is a compilation of traditional English nursery rhymes such as "Goosey Goosey Gander", "This Little Piggy" and "Three Blind Mice". The title character is a rabbit who brews ale for gentlemen.

It was Potter's second book of rhymes published by Warne, with the first one being Appley Dapply's Nursery Rhymes. Merchandise generated from the book includes Beswick Pottery porcelain figurines and Schmid music boxes.

== Sources ==
- DuBay, Debby; Sewall, Kara (2006), Beatrix Potter Collectibles: The Peter Rabbit Story Characters, Schiffer Publishing Ltd., ISBN 0-7643-2358-X
- Hobbs, Anne Stevenson (1989), Beatrix Potter's Art, Frederick Warne, ISBN 0-7232-3598-8
- Kutzer, M. Daphne (2003), Beatrix Potter: Writing in Code, New York & London: Routledge, ISBN 0-415-94352-3
- Lear, Linda (2007), Beatrix Potter: A Life in Nature, New York: St. Martin's Griffin, ISBN 978-0-312-37796-0
- MacDonald, Ruth K. (1986), Beatrix Potter, Boston: Twayne Publishers, ISBN 0-8057-6917-X
- Taylor, Judy (1996) [1986], Beatrix Potter: Artist, Storyteller and Countrywoman, Frederick Warne, ISBN 0-7232-4175-9
