= Pettitoes =

Pettitoes may refer to:

- pig's trotters
- Aunt Pettitoes, a character in Beatrix Potter's The Tale of Pigling Bland
