= The Fairy Caravan =

1929 children's book by Beatrix Potter

- Author: Beatrix Potter
- Illustrator: Beatrix Potter
- Language: English
- Genre: Children's literature
- Publisher: 1929 Alexander McKay (US); 1952 F. Warne & Co (UK)
- Publication place: United States
- Media type: Print (Hardcover)
- Pages: 225
- OCLC: 54274386
- Preceded by: Peter Rabbit's Almanac for 1929
- Followed by: The Tale of Little Pig Robinson

The Fairy Caravan is a children's book written and illustrated by Beatrix Potter and first published in 1929 by Alexander McKay in Philadelphia. As noted by Leslie Linder, "Potter did not wish for an English edition of The Fairy Caravan, because she felt the stories were 'too personal – too autobiographical' to publish in this country". To secure English copyright, however, Potter produced 100 copies with the first eighteen pages discarded and replaced by sheets privately printed in Ambleside by George Middleton.

== Plot ==
The story follows the adventures of Tuppenny, a young guinea pig who runs away from home to join a travelling circus.

== Background ==
The woods and estate surrounding Graythwaite Hall in the Lake District, Cumbria, are the backdrop for Potter's story. They were a favourite walking spot for Wordsworth.

== Reception ==
The book was described by Margaret Drabble as one of those "later written ... for the US", and "of little interest".
