= The Tale of Mrs. Tittlemouse =

Children's book by Beatrix Potter

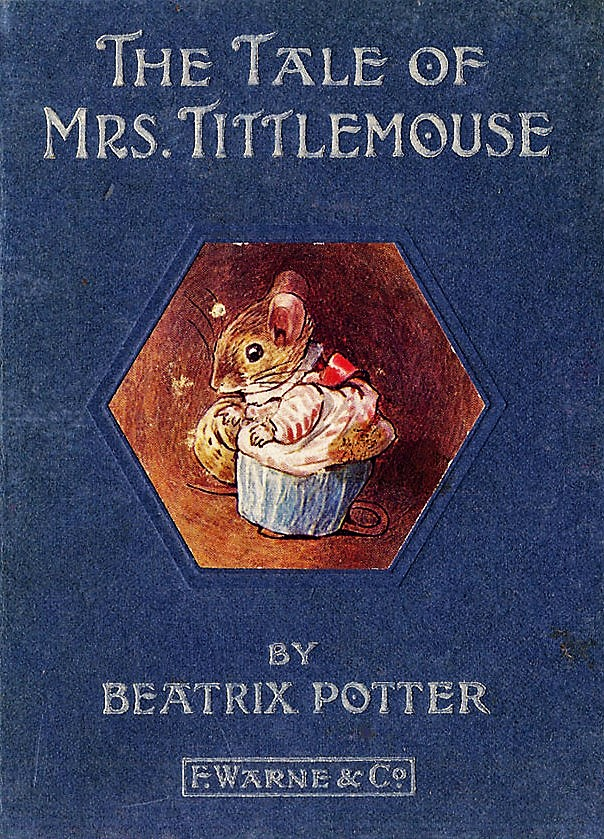
- First edition cover
- Author: Beatrix Potter
- Illustrator: Beatrix Potter
- Language: English
- Genre: Children's literature
- Publisher: Frederick Warne & Co.
- Publication date: July 1910
- Publication place: UK
- Media type: Print (hardcover)
- Preceded by: The Tale of Ginger and Pickles
- Followed by: The Tale of Timmy Tiptoes
- Text: The Tale of Mrs. Tittlemouse at Wikisource

The Tale of Mrs. Tittlemouse is a book written and illustrated by Beatrix Potter and first published by Frederick Warne & Co. in 1910. The book tells the story of a wood mouse named Mrs. Thomasina Tittlemouse and her efforts to keep her house in order, despite the appearance of uninvited visitors. A particularly annoying visitor for Mrs Tittlemouse is Mr. Jackson, a sloppy toad.

== Background ==
The character of Mrs. Tittlemouse first appeared in Potter's children's book The Tale of The Flopsy Bunnies, which was first published in July 1909.

The Tale of Mrs. Tittlemouse was originally produced by Potter in the form of a book with a leather cover. It was given to Nellie Warne, the young daughter of Potter's Publisher, Harold Warne as a New Year's gift.

== Plot ==
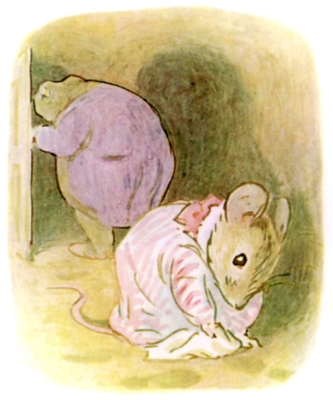
Beatrix Potter's illustration of Mrs. Tittlemouse wiping Mr. Jackson's wet footmarks off the floor

The story chronicles the hardships of the wood mouse Mrs. Tittlemouse, who tries to keep her home tidy. She turns away unwanted visitors: beetles, a ladybird, and a large spider seeking shelter from the rain. Along one of her passageways she runs into Babbitty Bumble, a bumblebee, and in a storeroom she comes across a nest of four more bees, whom she is unable to remove.

Mrs. Tittlemouse sends the uninvited ladybird off with a variant of the traditional nursery rhyme Ladybird Ladybird: "Your house is on fire, Mother Ladybird! Fly away home to your children!". She then runs into a spider who asks her: "Beg pardon, is this not Miss Muffet's?", a reference to the nursery rhyme Little Miss Muffet.

Upon returning to her parlour, she finds the neighbour from the drain below, Mr. Jackson the toad, sitting in her rocking chair, wet and dripping water onto the floor. He stays over dinner, but declines to eat any of the food Mrs. Tittlemouse offers him; she mops up his footprints as he rummages for honey. When Mr. Jackson finds the bees he pulls out their nest.

After Mr. Jackson departs, Mrs. Tittlemouse spends a fortnight on cleaning all the mess in her home. She uses twigs to make her front door narrower. She then holds a party for five other little mice—Mr. Jackson, being no longer able to fit through the door, sits outside drinking honey dew.

== Adaptations ==
An animated adaptation of the story, shown interspersed with The Tale of the Flopsy Bunnies, was featured on the BBC television anthology series The World of Peter Rabbit and Friends in 1996.

== Sources ==
- Lear, Linda J. (2007). Beatrix Potter: A Life in Nature. New York: St. Martin's Press. ISBN 978-03123-6-934-7.
