= Beatrix Potter =

English writer and illustrator (1866–1943)

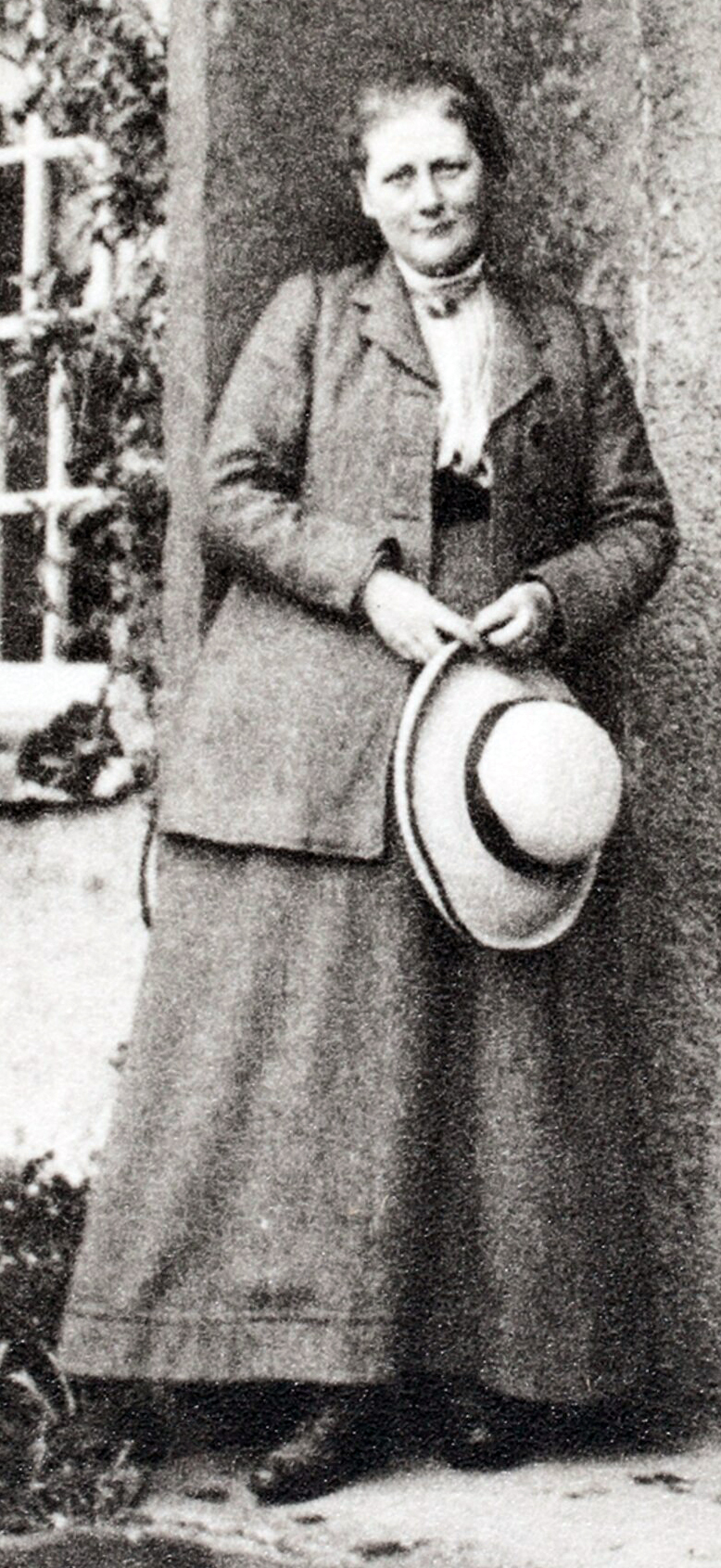
- Potter in 1913
- Born: Helen Beatrix Potter; 28 July 1866; West Brompton, London, England
- Died: 22 December 1943 (aged 77); Near Sawrey, Lancashire, England
- Occupations: Children's author and illustrator
- Spouse: William Heelis (m. 1913)
- Partner(s): Norman Warne (fiancé; died before marriage)
- Relatives: Edmund Potter (grandfather)
- Writing career
- Notable work: The Tale of Peter Rabbit

Helen Beatrix Heelis (née Potter; 28 July 1866 – 22 December 1943), usually known as Beatrix Potter (/ˈbiːətrɪks/ BEE-ə-triks), was an English writer, illustrator, natural scientist, and conservationist. She is best known for her children's books featuring animals, such as The Tale of Peter Rabbit, which was her first commercially published work in 1902. Her books, including The Tale of Jemima Puddle Duck and The Tale of Tom Kitten, have sold more than 250 million copies. An entrepreneur, Potter was a pioneer of character merchandising. In 1903, Peter Rabbit was the first fictional character to be made into a patented stuffed toy, making him the oldest licensed character.

Born into an upper-middle-class household, Potter was educated by governesses and grew up isolated from other children. She had numerous pets and spent holidays in Scotland and the Lake District, and North Wales (particularly Denbigh) developing a love of landscape, flora and fauna, all of which she closely observed and painted. Potter's study and watercolours of fungi led to her being widely respected in the field of mycology. In her thirties, Potter self-published the highly successful children's book The Tale of Peter Rabbit. Following this, Potter began writing and illustrating children's books full-time.

Potter wrote over sixty books, with the best known being her twenty-three children's tales. In 1905, using the proceeds from her books and a legacy from an aunt, Potter bought Hill Top Farm in Near Sawrey, a village in the Lake District. Over the following decades, she purchased additional farms to preserve the unique hill country landscape. In 1913, at the age of 47, she married William Heelis (1871–1945), a respected local solicitor with an office in Hawkshead. Potter was also a prize-winning breeder of Herdwick sheep and a prosperous farmer keenly interested in land preservation. She continued to write, illustrate, and design merchandise based on her children's books for British publisher Warne until the duties of land management and her diminishing eyesight made it difficult to continue.

Potter died of pneumonia and heart disease on 22 December 1943 at her home in Near Sawrey at the age of 77, leaving almost all her property to the National Trust. She is credited with preserving much of the land that now constitutes the Lake District National Park. Potter's books continue to sell throughout the world in many languages with her stories being retold in songs, films, ballet, and animations, and her life is depicted in two films – The Tale of Beatrix Potter (1983) and Miss Potter (2006).

== Biography ==
=== Early life ===
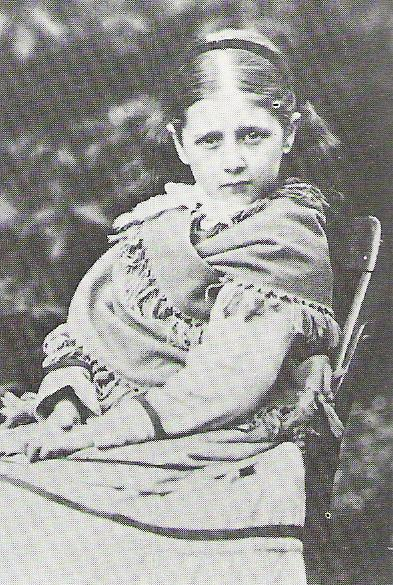
Potter aged eight, c. 1874

Potter's family on both sides were from the Manchester area. They were English Unitarians, associated with dissenting Protestant congregations, influential in 19th-century Britain, that affirmed the oneness of God and that rejected the doctrine of the Trinity. Potter's paternal grandfather, Edmund Potter, from Glossop in Derbyshire, owned what was then the largest calico printing works in England, and later served as a Member of Parliament.

Potter's father, Rupert William Potter, was educated at Manchester College by the Unitarian philosopher James Martineau. He then trained as a barrister in London. Rupert practiced law, specialising in equity law and conveyancing. He married Helen Leech (1839–1932) on 8 August 1863 at Hyde Unitarian Chapel, Gee Cross. Helen was the daughter of Jane Ashton (1806–1884) and John Leech, a wealthy cotton merchant and shipbuilder from Stalybridge. Helen's first cousins were siblings Harriet Lupton (née Ashton) and Thomas Ashton, 1st Baron Ashton of Hyde. It was reported in July 2014 that Potter had personally given a number of her own original hand-painted illustrations to the two daughters of Arthur and Harriet Lupton, who were cousins to both Beatrix Potter and Catherine, Princess of Wales.

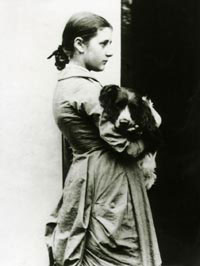
Potter aged fifteen with her springer spaniel, Spot

Potter's parents lived comfortably at 2 Bolton Gardens, West Brompton, London, where Helen Beatrix was born on 28 July 1866 and her brother Walter Bertram on 14 March 1872. The house was destroyed in the Blitz. Bousfield Primary School now stands where the house once was. A blue plaque on the school building testifies to the former site of the Potter home. Both parents were artistically talented, and Rupert was an adept amateur photographer. Rupert had invested in the stock market, and by the early 1890s, he was extremely wealthy.

Beatrix Potter was educated by three governesses, the last of whom was Annie Moore (née Carter), just three years older than Potter, who tutored Potter in German as well as acting as lady's companion. She and Potter remained friends throughout their lives, and Annie's eight children were the recipients of many of Potter's picture letters. It was Annie who later suggested that these letters might make good children's books.

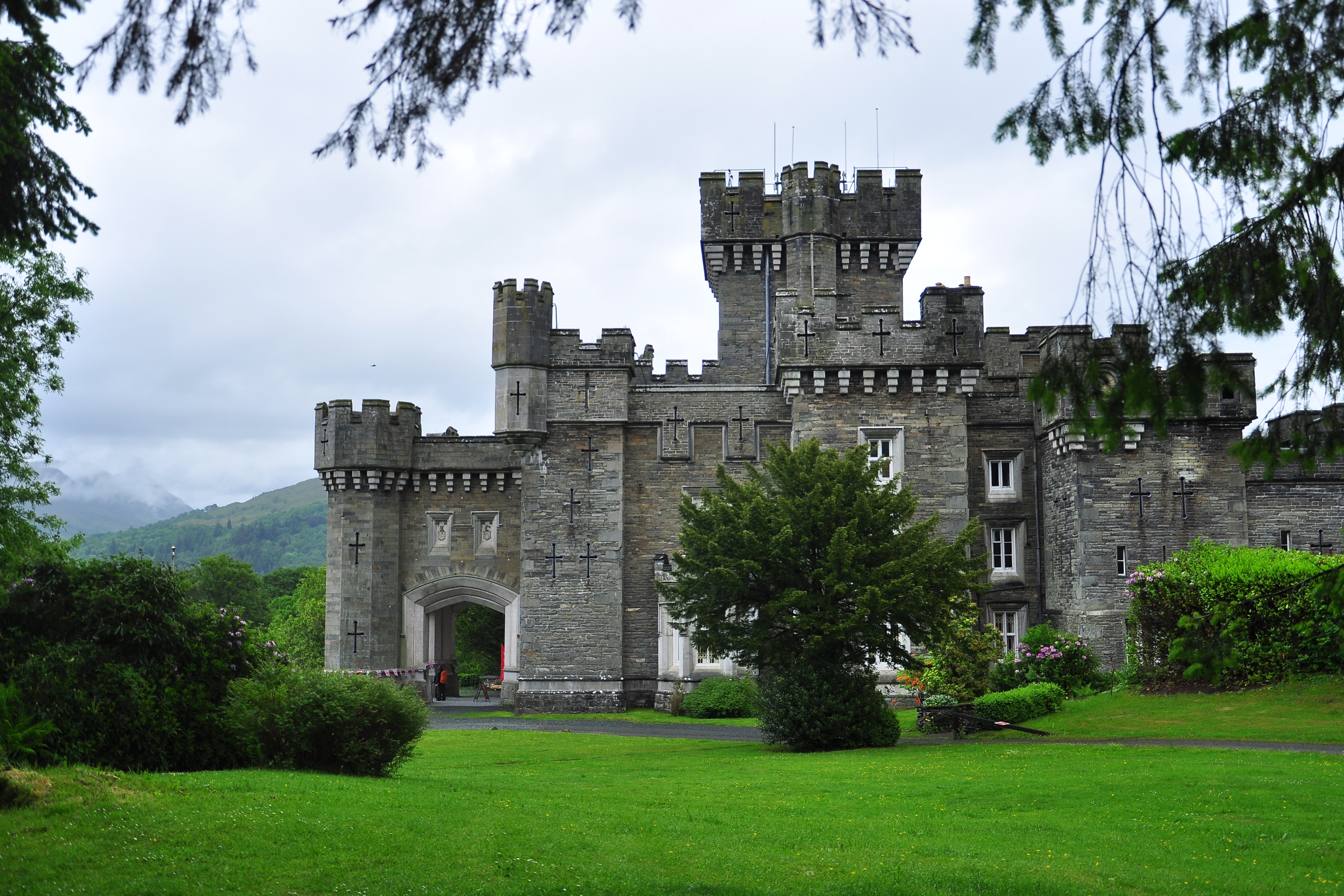
In 1882, Potter's stay at Wray Castle on the banks of Lake Windermere during a family holiday began her long association with the English Lake District.

She and her younger brother Walter Bertram grew up with few friends outside their large extended family. Her parents were artistic, interested in nature, and enjoyed the countryside. As children, Potter and Bertram had numerous small animals as pets which they observed closely and drew endlessly. In their schoolroom, Potter and Bertram kept a variety of small pets—mice, rabbits, a hedgehog and some bats, along with collections of butterflies and other insects—which they drew and studied. Potter was devoted to the care of her small animals, often taking them with her on long holidays. In most of the first fifteen years of her life, Potter spent summer holidays at Dalguise, an estate on the River Tay in Perthshire, Scotland. There she sketched and explored an area that nourished her imagination and her observation. Her first sketchbook from those holidays, kept at age 8 and dated 1875, is held at and has been digitised by the Victoria & Albert Museum, London. Potter and her brother were allowed great freedom in the country, and both children became adept students of natural history. In 1882, when Dalguise was no longer available, the Potters took their first summer holiday in the Lake District, at Wray Castle near Lake Windermere. Here Potter met Hardwicke Rawnsley, vicar of Wray and later the founding secretary of the National Trust, whose interest in the countryside and country life inspired the same in Potter and who was to have a lasting impact on her life.

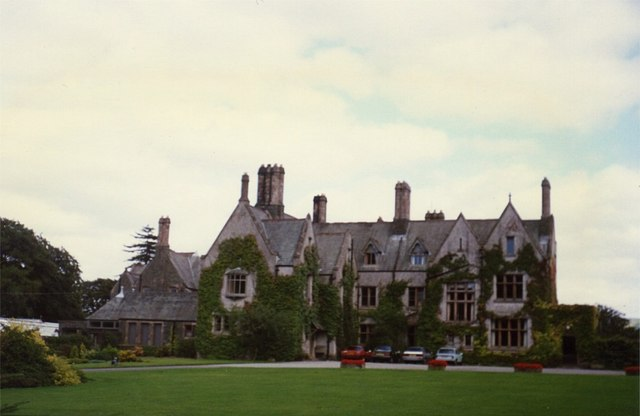
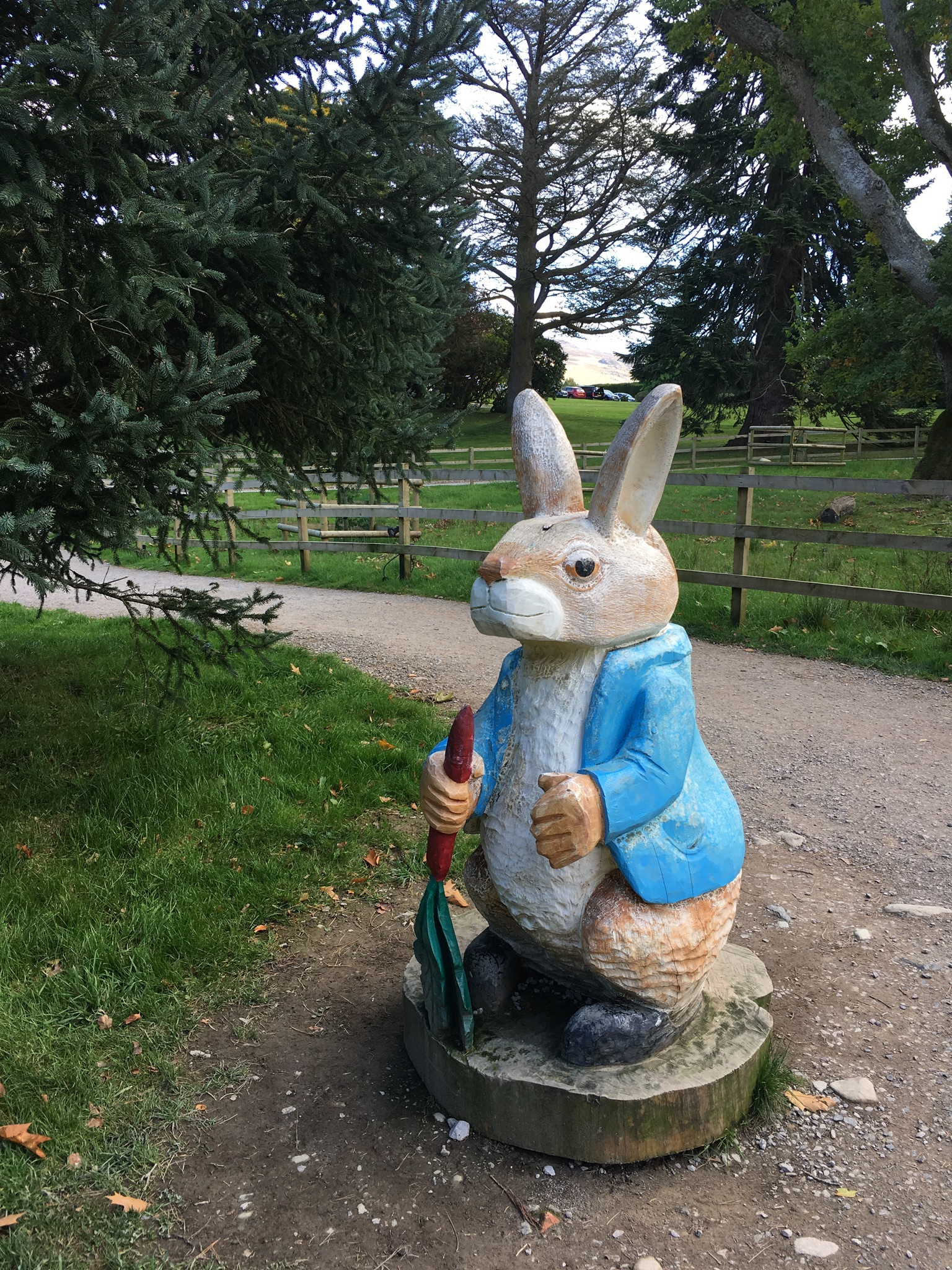
Lingholm country house (where Potter spent her summer holidays from 1885 to 1907) and a statue of Peter Rabbit on the house grounds. Lingholm kitchen garden inspired Mr. McGregor's garden in the Peter Rabbit stories. With its connection to Potter, Lingholm was listed Grade II on the National Heritage List for England in 2013.

At about the age of 14, Potter began to keep a diary, written in a simple substitution cipher of her own devising. Her Journal was important to the development of her creativity, serving as both sketchbook and literary experiment. In tiny handwriting, she reported on society, recorded her impressions of art and artists, recounted stories and observed life around her. The Journal, deciphered and transcribed by Leslie Linder in 1958, does not provide an intimate record of her personal life, but it is an invaluable source for understanding a vibrant part of British society in the late 19th century. It describes Potter's maturing artistic and intellectual interests, her often amusing insights into the places she visited, and her unusual ability to observe nature and to describe it. Started in 1881, her journal ends in 1897 when her artistic and intellectual energies were absorbed in scientific study and in efforts to publish her drawings. Precocious but reserved and often bored, she was searching for more independent activities and wished to earn some money of her own while dutifully taking care of her parents, dealing with her especially demanding mother, and managing their various households.

=== Scientific illustrations and work in mycology ===
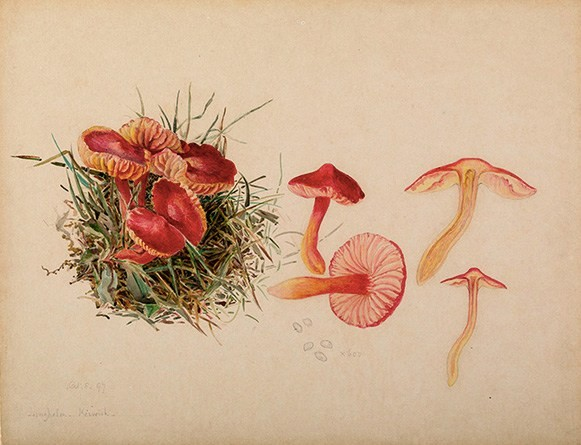
Beatrix Potter: reproductive system of Hygrocybe coccinea, 1897

In the Victorian era, women of her class were privately educated and rarely went to university. Potter's parents encouraged her higher education, but the social norms of the time limited her academic career within Britain's institutions.

Beatrix Potter was interested in every branch of natural science except astronomy. She collected fossils, studied archaeological artefacts from London excavations, and was interested in entomology. In all these areas, she drew and painted her specimens with increasing skill. By the 1890s, her scientific interests centred on mycology. First drawn to fungi because of their colours and evanescence in nature and her delight in painting them, her interest deepened after meeting Charles McIntosh, a revered naturalist and amateur mycologist, during a summer holiday in Dunkeld in Perthshire in 1892. He helped improve the accuracy of her illustrations, taught her taxonomy, and supplied her with live specimens to paint during the winter. Curious as to how fungi reproduced, Potter began microscopic drawings of fungus spores (the agarics) and in 1895 developed a theory of their germination. Through the connections of her uncle Sir Henry Enfield Roscoe, a chemist and vice-chancellor of the University of London, she consulted with botanists at Kew Gardens, convincing George Massee of her ability to germinate spores and her theory of hybridisation. She did not believe in the theory of symbiosis proposed by Simon Schwendener, the German mycologist, as previously thought; instead, she proposed a more independent process of reproduction.

Rebuffed by William Thiselton-Dyer, the Director at Kew, because of her sex and amateur status, Potter wrote up her conclusions and submitted a paper, On the Germination of the Spores of the Agaricineae, to the Linnean Society in 1897. It was introduced by Massee because, as a woman, Potter could neither attend proceedings nor read her paper. She subsequently withdrew it, realising that some of her samples were contaminated, but continued her microscopic studies for several more years. Her work is only now being properly evaluated. Potter later gave her other mycological and scientific drawings to the Armitt Museum and Library in Ambleside, where mycologists still refer to them to identify fungi. There is also a collection of her fungus paintings at the Perth Museum and Art Gallery in Perth, Scotland, donated by Charles McIntosh. In 1967, the mycologist Walter Findlay included many of Potter's beautifully accurate fungus drawings in his Wayside & Woodland Fungi, thereby fulfilling her desire to one day have her fungus drawings published in a book. In 1997, the Linnean Society issued a posthumous apology to Potter for the sexism displayed in its handling of her research.

=== Artistic and literary career ===
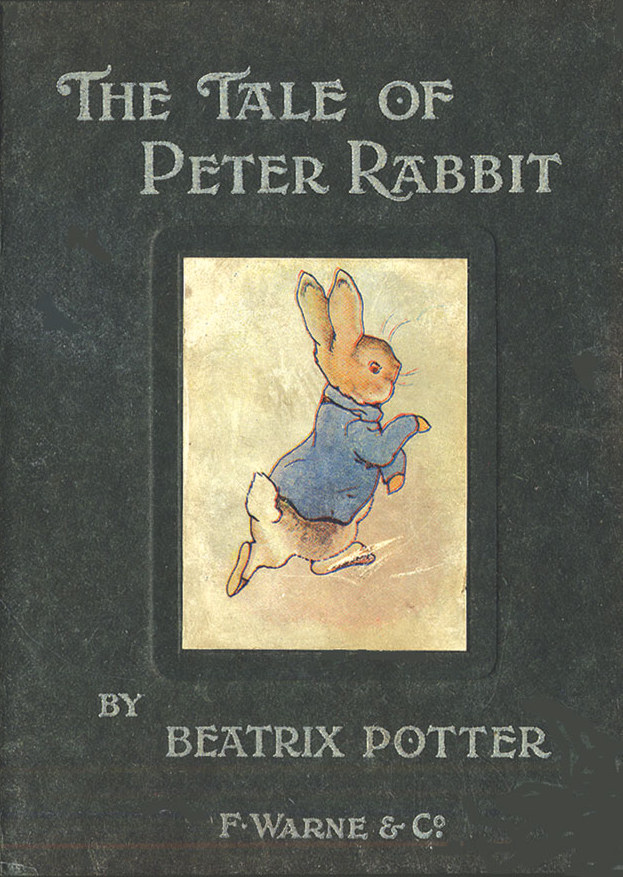
First edition, 1902

Potter's artistic and literary interests were deeply influenced by fairy tales and fantasy. She was a student of the classic fairy tales of Western Europe as well as stories from the Old Testament, John Bunyan's The Pilgrim's Progress and Harriet Beecher Stowe's Uncle Tom's Cabin. She grew up with Aesop's Fables, the fairy tales of the Brothers Grimm and Hans Christian Andersen, Charles Kingsley's The Water Babies, the folk tales and mythology of Scotland, the German Romantics, Shakespeare, and the romances of Sir Walter Scott. As a young child, before the age of eight, Edward Lear's A Book of Nonsense, including the much-loved The Owl and the Pussycat, and Lewis Carroll's Alice in Wonderland had made their impression, although she later said of Alice that she was more interested in Tenniel's illustrations than what they were about.

The Brer Rabbit stories of Joel Chandler Harris had been family favourites, and she later studied his Uncle Remus stories and illustrated them. She studied book illustration from a young age and developed her own tastes, but the work of the picture book triumvirate Walter Crane, Kate Greenaway and Randolph Caldecott, the last an illustrator whose work was later collected by her father, was a great influence. Her earliest illustrations focused on traditional rhymes and stories like Cinderella, Sleeping Beauty, Ali Baba and the Forty Thieves, Puss in Boots, and Little Red Riding Hood. However, most often her illustrations were fantasies featuring her own pets: mice, rabbits, kittens, and guinea pigs.

In her teenage years, Potter was a regular visitor to the art galleries of London, particularly enjoying the summer and winter exhibitions at the Royal Academy in London. Her Journal reveals her growing sophistication as a critic as well as the influence of her father's friend, the artist Sir John Everett Millais, who recognised Potter's talent of observation. Although Potter was aware of art and artistic trends, her drawing and her prose style were uniquely her own.

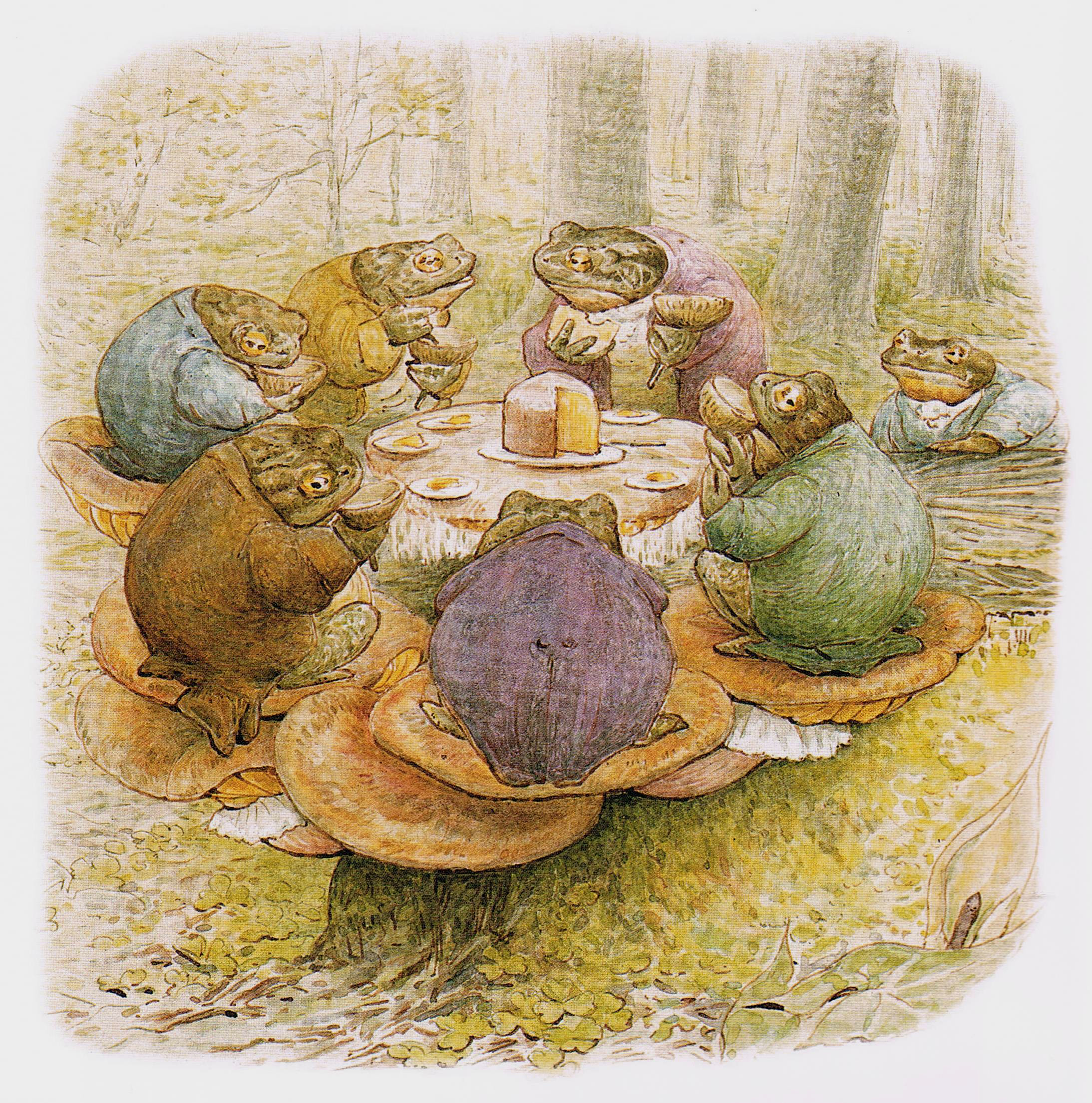
Potter illustration, "Toad's Tea Party", c. 1905, which appears in her Appley Dapply's Nursery Rhymes, 1917

As a way to earn money in the 1890s, Potter printed Christmas cards of her own design, as well as cards for special occasions. These were her first commercially successful works as an illustrator. Mice and rabbits were the most frequent subject of her fantasy paintings. In 1890, the firm of Hildesheimer and Faulkner bought several of the drawings of her rabbit Benjamin Bunny to illustrate verses by Frederic Weatherly titled A Happy Pair. In 1893, the same printer bought several more drawings for Weatherly's Our Dear Relations, another book of rhymes, and the following year Potter sold a series of frog illustrations and verses for Changing Pictures, a popular annual offered by the art publisher Ernest Nister. Potter was pleased by this success and determined to publish her own illustrated stories.

Whenever Potter went on holiday to the Lake District or Scotland, she sent letters to young friends, illustrating them with quick sketches. Many of these letters were written to the children of her former governess Annie Carter Moore, particularly to Moore's eldest son Noel, who was often ill. In September 1893, Potter was on holiday at Eastwood in Dunkeld, Perthshire. She had run out of things to say to Noel, and so she told him a story about "four little rabbits whose names were Flopsy, Mopsy, Cottontail, and Peter". It became one of the most famous children's letters ever written and the basis of Potter's future career as a writer-artist-storyteller.

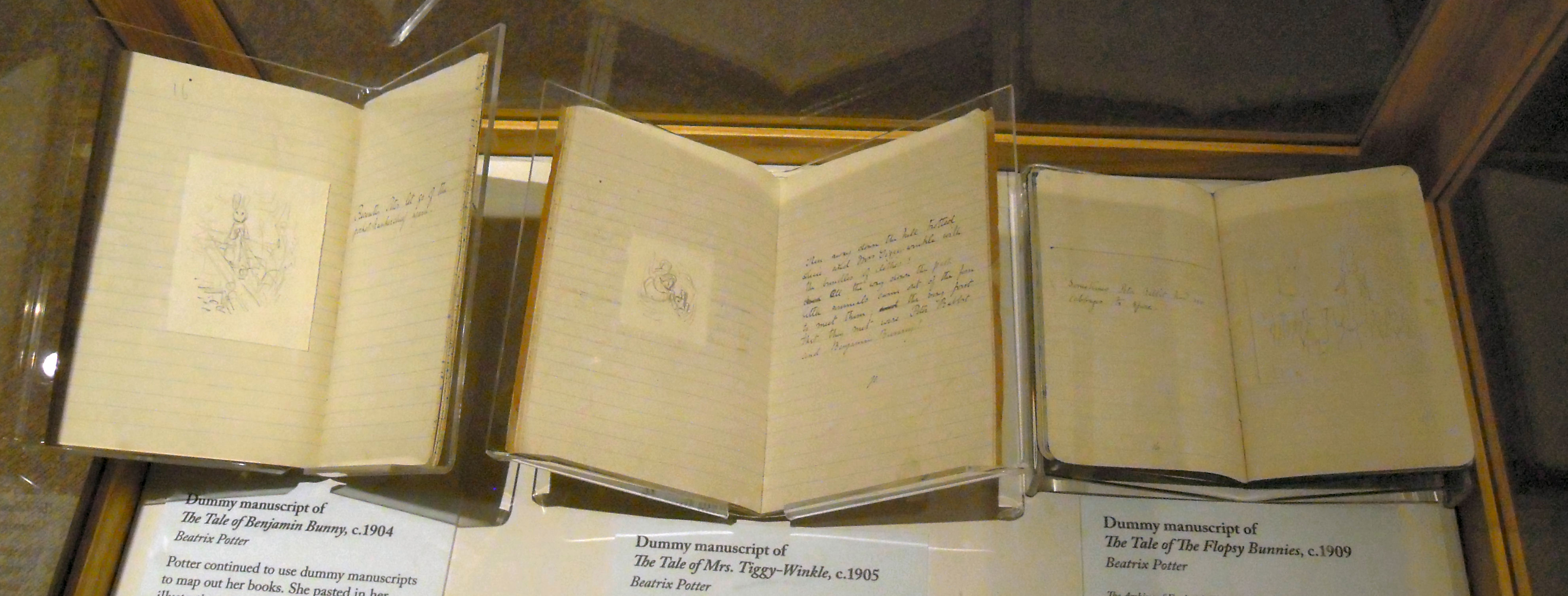
Potter's dummy manuscripts of three of her books – designed to see how the printed book would look

In 1900, Potter revised her tale about the four little rabbits, and fashioned a dummy book of it – it has been suggested, in imitation of Helen Bannerman's 1899 bestseller The Story of Little Black Sambo. Unable to find a buyer for the work, she published it for family and friends at her own expense in December 1901. It was drawn in black and white with a coloured frontispiece. Rawnsley had great faith in Potter's tale, recast it in didactic verse, and made the rounds of the London publishing houses. Frederick Warne & Co had previously rejected the tale but, eager to compete in the booming small format children's book market, reconsidered and accepted the "bunny book" (as the firm called it) following the recommendation of their prominent children's book artist L. Leslie Brooke. The firm declined Rawnsley's verse in favour of Potter's original prose, and Potter agreed to colour her pen and ink illustrations, choosing the new Hentschel three-colour process to reproduce her watercolours.

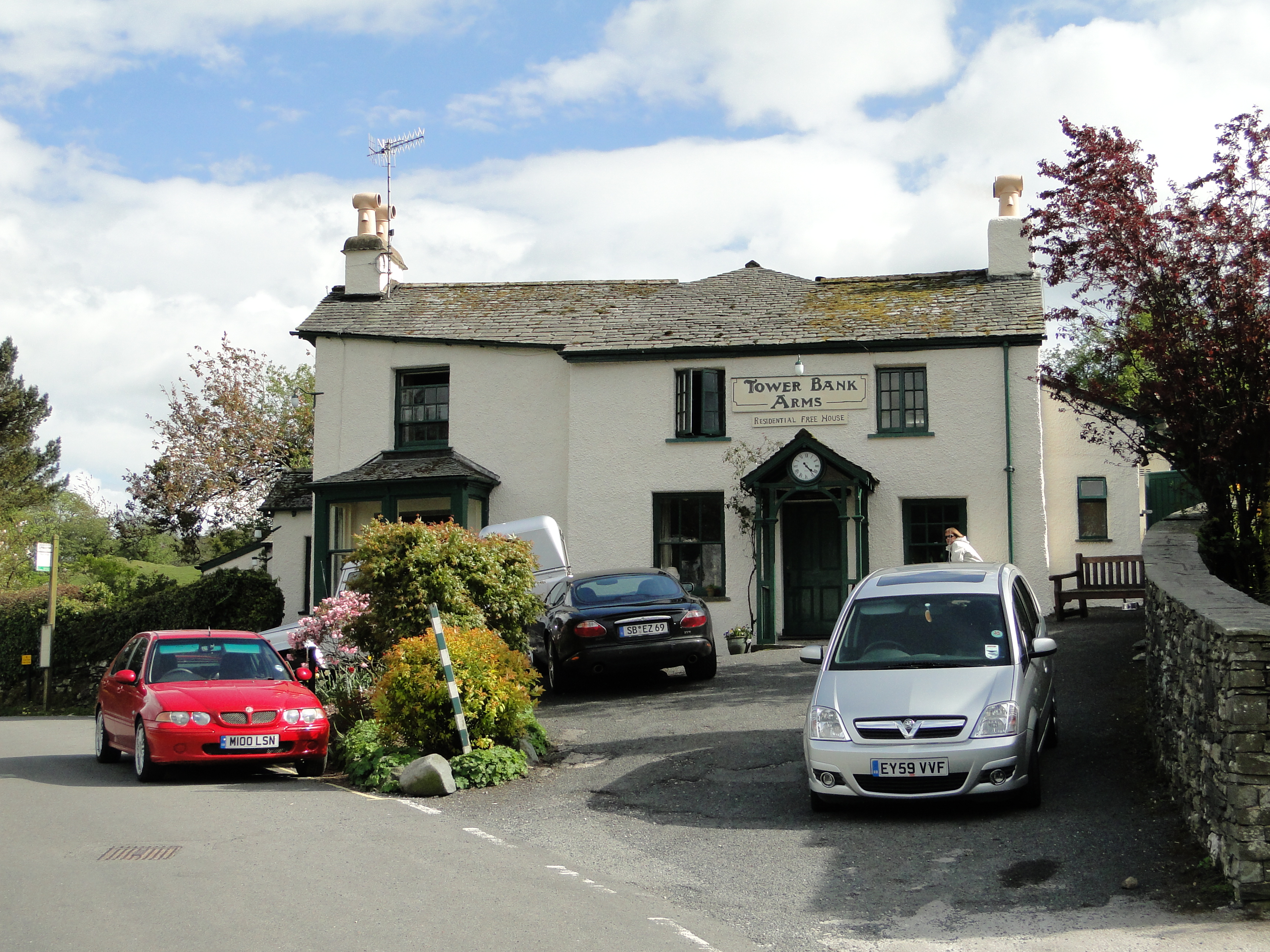
Potter used many real locations for her book illustrations. The Tower Bank Arms, Near Sawrey appears in The Tale of Jemima Puddle-Duck.

On 2 October 1902, The Tale of Peter Rabbit was published and became an immediate success. It was followed the next year by The Tale of Squirrel Nutkin and The Tailor of Gloucester, which had also first been written as picture letters to the Moore children. Working with Norman Warne as her editor, Potter published two or three little books each year: 23 books in all. The last book in this format was Cecily Parsley's Nursery Rhymes in 1922, a collection of favourite rhymes. Although The Tale of Little Pig Robinson was not published until 1930, it had been written much earlier. Potter continued creating her little books until after the First World War when her energies were increasingly directed toward her farming, sheep-breeding, and land conservation.

The immense popularity of Potter's books was based on the lively quality of her illustrations, the non-didactic nature of her stories, the depiction of the rural countryside, and the imaginative qualities she lent to her animal characters.

Potter was also a canny businesswoman. As early as 1903, she made and patented a Peter Rabbit doll. It was followed by other merchandise over the years, including painting books, board games, wall-paper, figurines, baby blankets and china tea-sets. All were licensed by Frederick Warne & Co and earned Potter an independent income, as well as immense profits for her publisher.

In 1905, Potter and Norman Warne became unofficially engaged. Potter's parents objected to the match because Warne was "in trade" and thus not socially suitable. The engagement lasted only one month—Warne died of pernicious anaemia at age 37. That same year, Potter used some of her income and a small inheritance from an aunt to buy Hill Top Farm in Near Sawrey, located 6 miles (9.7 km) west of Lake Windermere in the English Lake District. Potter and Warne may have hoped that Hill Top Farm would be their holiday home, but after Warne's death, Potter went ahead with its purchase as she had always wanted to own that farm and live in "that charming village".

=== Country life and marriage ===
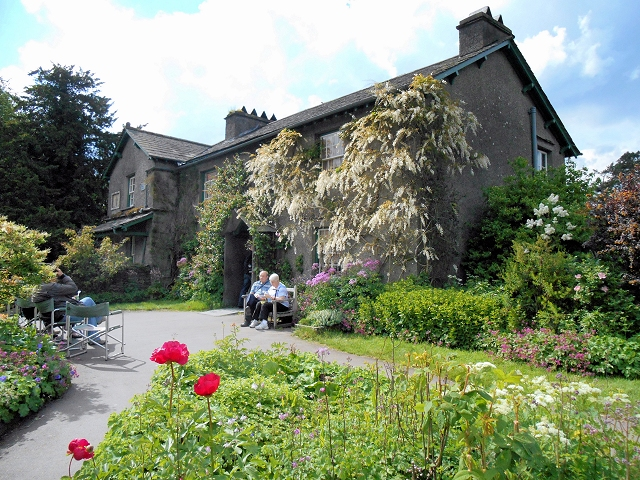
Hill Top in Near Sawrey – Potter's home from 1905 until her death in 1943, now owned by the National Trust and preserved as it was when she lived and wrote her stories there.

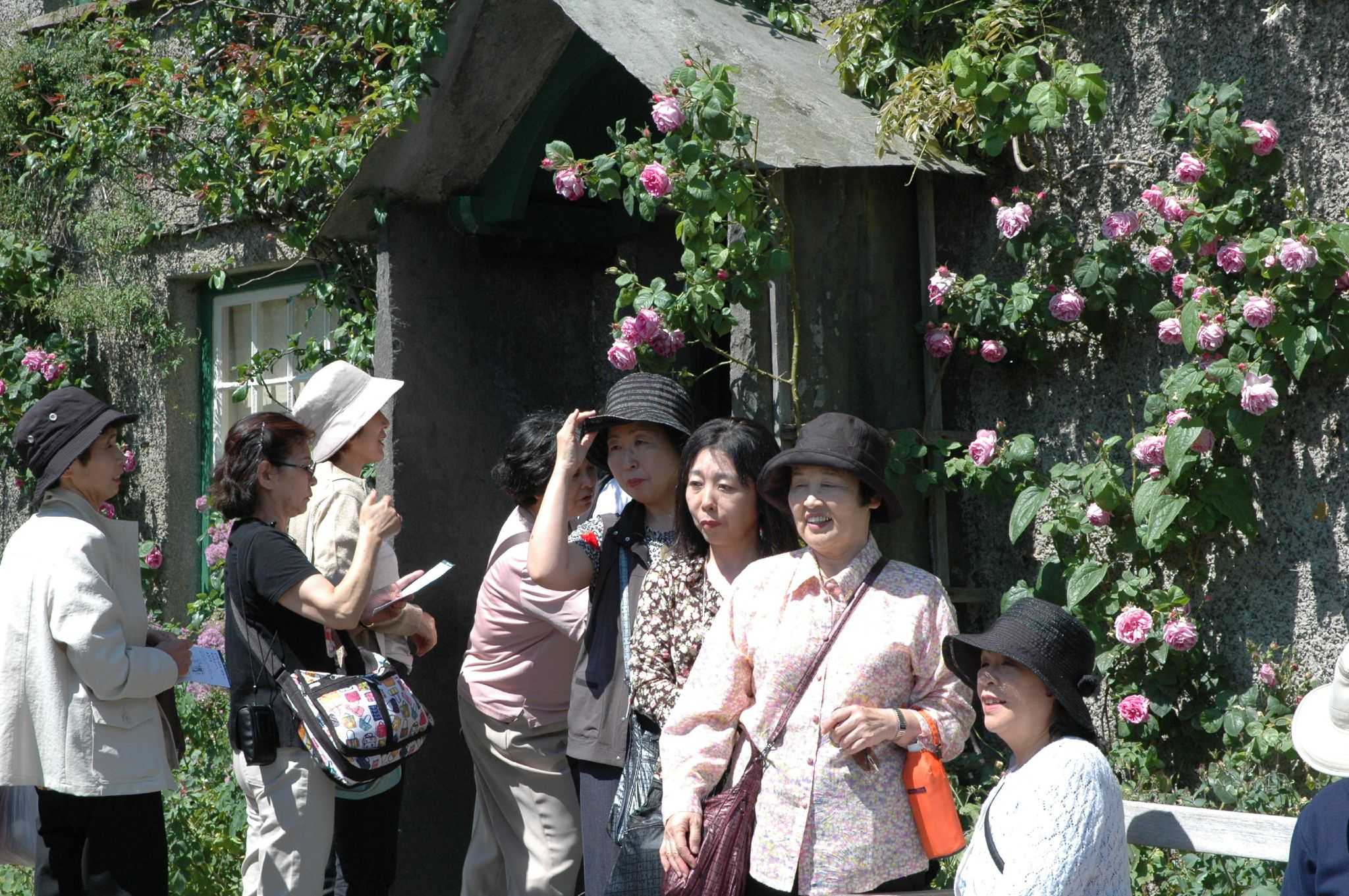
Japanese tourists (pictured at Hill Top) are among the frequent visitors to Potter's home. Merchandisers in Japan estimate that 80% of the population have heard of Peter Rabbit.

The tenant farmer John Cannon and his family agreed to stay on to manage the farm for her while she made physical improvements and learned the techniques of fell farming and of raising livestock, including pigs, cows and chickens; the following year she added sheep. Realising she needed to protect her boundaries, she sought advice from W.H. Heelis & Son, a local firm of solicitors with offices in nearby Hawkshead. With William Heelis acting for her, she bought contiguous pasture, and in 1909 the 20 acres (8.1 ha) Castle Farm across the road from Hill Top Farm. She visited Hill Top at every opportunity, and her books written during this period (such as The Tale of Ginger and Pickles, about the local shop in Near Sawrey and The Tale of Mrs. Tittlemouse, a wood mouse) reflect her increasing participation in village life and her delight in country living.

"Hill Top is to be presented to my visitors as if I had just gone out and they had just missed me."

— Statement by Potter in her will to the National Trust.

Owning and managing these working farms required routine collaboration with the widely respected William Heelis. By the summer of 1912, Heelis had proposed marriage and Potter had accepted, though she did not immediately tell her parents, who once again disapproved because Heelis was only a country solicitor. Potter and Heelis were married on 15 October 1913 in London at St Mary Abbots in Kensington. The couple moved immediately to Near Sawrey, residing at Castle Cottage, the renovated farmhouse on Castle Farm, which was 34 acres (14 ha) large. Hill Top remained a working farm but was now remodelled to allow for the tenant family and Potter's private studio and workshop. At last her own woman, Potter settled into the partnerships that shaped the rest of her life: her country solicitor husband and his large family, her farms, the Sawrey community and the predictable rounds of country life. The Tale of Jemima Puddle-Duck and The Tale of Tom Kitten are representative of Hill Top Farm and her farming life and reflect her happiness with her country life.

Her father, Rupert Potter, died in 1914, and with the outbreak of World War I, Potter persuaded her mother to move to the Lake District, renting her a property in Sawrey. Finding life in Sawrey dull, Helen Potter soon moved to Lindeth Howe (now a 34-bedroomed hotel), a large house the Potters had previously rented for the summer in Bowness, on the other side of Lake Windermere. Potter continued to write stories for Frederick Warne & Co and fully participated in country life. She established a nursing trust for local villages and served on various committees and councils responsible for footpaths and other rural issues.

=== Sheep farming ===
Soon after acquiring Hill Top Farm, Potter became keenly interested in the breeding and raising of Herdwick sheep, the indigenous fell sheep. In 1923 she bought a large sheep farm in the Troutbeck Valley called Troutbeck Park Farm, formerly a deer park, restoring its land with thousands of Herdwick sheep. This established her as one of the major Herdwick sheep farmers in the county. She was admired by her shepherds and farm managers for her willingness to experiment with the latest biological remedies for the common diseases of sheep, and for her employment of the best shepherds, sheep breeders, and farm managers.

By the late 1920s, Potter and her Hill Top farm manager Tom Storey had made a name for their prize-winning Herdwick flock, which took many prizes at the local agricultural shows, where Potter was often asked to serve as a judge. In 1942 she became President-elect of the Herdwick Sheepbreeders' Association, the first time a woman had been elected, but died before taking office.

=== Welsh language ===
In one of her diary entries whilst travelling through Wales, Potter complained about the Welsh language. She wrote "Machynlleth, wretched town, hardly a person could speak English", continuing "Welsh seem a pleasant intelligent race, but I should think awkward to live with... the language is past description."

== Lake District conservation ==
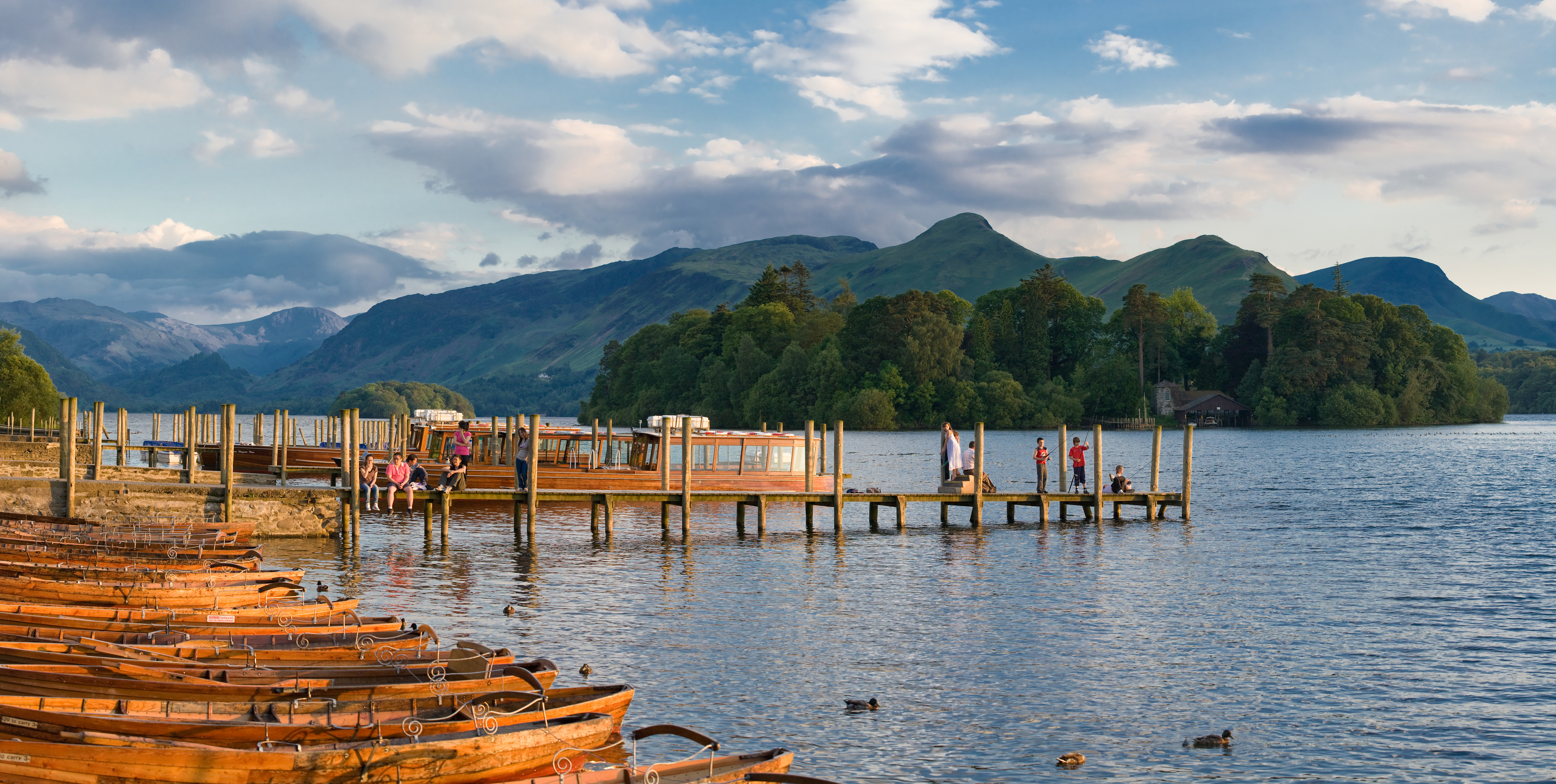
The Lake District in North West England

Potter had been a disciple of the land conservation and preservation ideals of her long-time friend and mentor, Canon Hardwicke Rawnsley, the first secretary and founding member of the National Trust. According to the National Trust, "she supported the efforts of the National Trust to preserve not just the places of extraordinary beauty but also those heads of valleys and low grazing lands that would be irreparably ruined by development." Potter was also an authority on the traditional Lakeland crafts and period furniture, as well as local stonework. She restored and preserved the farms that she bought or managed, making sure that each farm house had in it a piece of antique Lakeland furniture. Potter was interested in preserving not only the Herdwick sheep but also the way of life of fell farming. In 1930 the Heelises became partners with the National Trust in buying and managing the fell farms included in the large Monk Coniston Estate.

The estate was composed of many farms spread over a wide area of north-western Lancashire, including the Tarn Hows. Potter was the de facto estate manager for the Trust for seven years until the National Trust could afford to repurchase most of the property from her. Potter's stewardship of these farms earned her full regard, but she was not without her critics, not the least of which were her contemporaries who felt she used her wealth and the position of her husband to acquire properties in advance of their being made public. She was notable in observing the problems of afforestation, preserving the intact grazing lands, and husbanding the quarries and timber on these farms. All her farms were stocked with Herdwick sheep and frequently with Galloway cattle.

== Later life ==
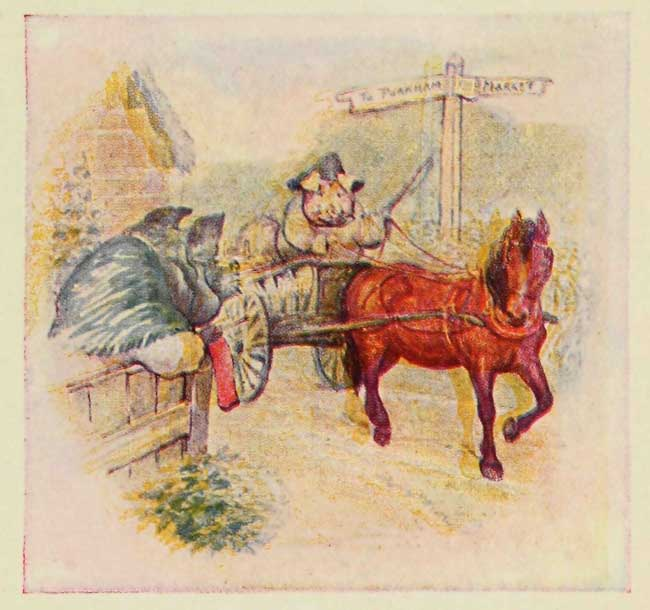
"This Little Piggy" illustration by Potter from her Cecily Parsley's Nursery Rhymes, 1922

Potter continued to write stories and to draw, although mostly for her own pleasure. In 1922, Cecily Parsley's Nursery Rhymes, a collection of traditional English nursery rhymes, was published. Her books in the late 1920s included the semi-autobiographical The Fairy Caravan, a fanciful tale set in her beloved Troutbeck fells. It was published only in the US during Potter's lifetime, and not until 1952 in the UK. Sister Anne, Potter's version of the story of Bluebeard, was written for her American readers, but illustrated by Katharine Sturges. A final folktale, Wag by Wall, was published posthumously by The Horn Book Magazine in 1944. Potter was a generous patron of the Girl Guides, whose troops she allowed to make their summer encampments on her land, and whose company she enjoyed as an older woman.

Potter and William Heelis enjoyed a happy marriage of thirty years, continuing their farming and preservation efforts throughout the hard days of World War II. Although they were childless, Potter played an important role in William's large family, particularly enjoying her relationship with several nieces whom she helped educate, and giving comfort and aid to her husband's brothers and sisters.

Potter died of complications from pneumonia and heart disease on 22 December 1943 at Castle Cottage, and her remains were cremated at Carleton Crematorium, Blackpool. She left nearly all her property to the National Trust, including over 4,000 acres (16 km^{2}) of land, sixteen farms, cottages and herds of cattle and Herdwick sheep. Hers was the largest gift at that time to the National Trust, and it enabled the preservation of the land now included in the Lake District National Park and the continuation of fell farming. The central office of the National Trust in Swindon was named "Heelis" in 2005 in her memory. William Heelis continued his stewardship of their properties and of her literary and artistic work for the twenty months he survived her. When he died in August 1945, he left the remainder to the National Trust.

== Legacy ==
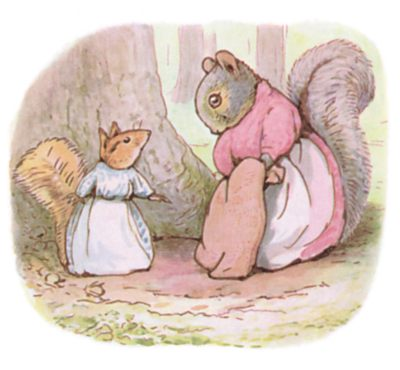
Goody and Mrs. Hackee, illustration to The Tale of Timmy Tiptoes, 1911

Potter left almost all the original illustrations for her books to the National Trust. The copyright to her stories and merchandise was then given to her publisher Frederick Warne & Co, now a division of the Penguin Group. On 1 January 2014, the copyright expired in the UK and other countries with a 70-years-after-death limit. Hill Top Farm was opened to the public by the National Trust in 1946; her artwork was displayed there until 1985 when it was moved to William Heelis's former law office in Hawkshead, also owned by the National Trust. The Beatrix Potter Gallery, housed in the former law office, showed a selection of her work until 2022. In 2023 it was decided that the gallery should not reopen because the building did not meet modern conservation standards.

Potter gave her folios of mycological drawings to the Armitt Library and Museum in Ambleside before her death. The Tale of Peter Rabbit is owned by Warne, The Tailor of Gloucester by the Tate Gallery, and The Tale of the Flopsy Bunnies by the British Museum.

Painting and drawing book, 1915

Beatrix Potter was the first to recognise that content—as we now call the stuff that makes up a book or a film—was only the beginning. In 1903, Peter hopped outside his pages to become a patented soft toy, which gave him the distinction of being not only Mr. McGregor‘s mortal enemy, but also becoming the first licensed character.

— Erica Wagner of The Times.

In 1903, Potter created the first Peter Rabbit soft toy and registered him at the Patent Office in London, making Peter the oldest licensed fictional character. Merchandise of Peter and other Potter characters have been sold at Harrods department store in London since at least 1910 when the range first appeared in their catalogues. Along with her writing Potter would continue to oversee merchandising and licensing opportunities for her characters. On her legacy, Nicholas Tucker in The Guardian writes, "she was the first author to license fictional characters to a range of toys and household objects still on sale today". In an article by the Smithsonian magazine titled, How Beatrix Potter Invented Character Merchandising, Joy Lanzendorfer writes, "Potter was also an entrepreneur and a pioneer in licensing and merchandising literary characters. Potter built a retail empire out of her 'bunny book' that is worth $500 million today. In the process, she created a system that continues to benefit all licensed characters, from Mickey Mouse to Harry Potter."

The largest public collection of her letters and drawings is the Leslie Linder Bequest and Leslie Linder Collection at the Victoria and Albert Museum in London. (Linder was the collector who—after five years of work—finally transcribed Potter's early journal, originally written in code.) In the United States, the largest public collections are those in the Rare Book Department of the Free Library of Philadelphia, and the Cotsen Children's Library at Princeton University.

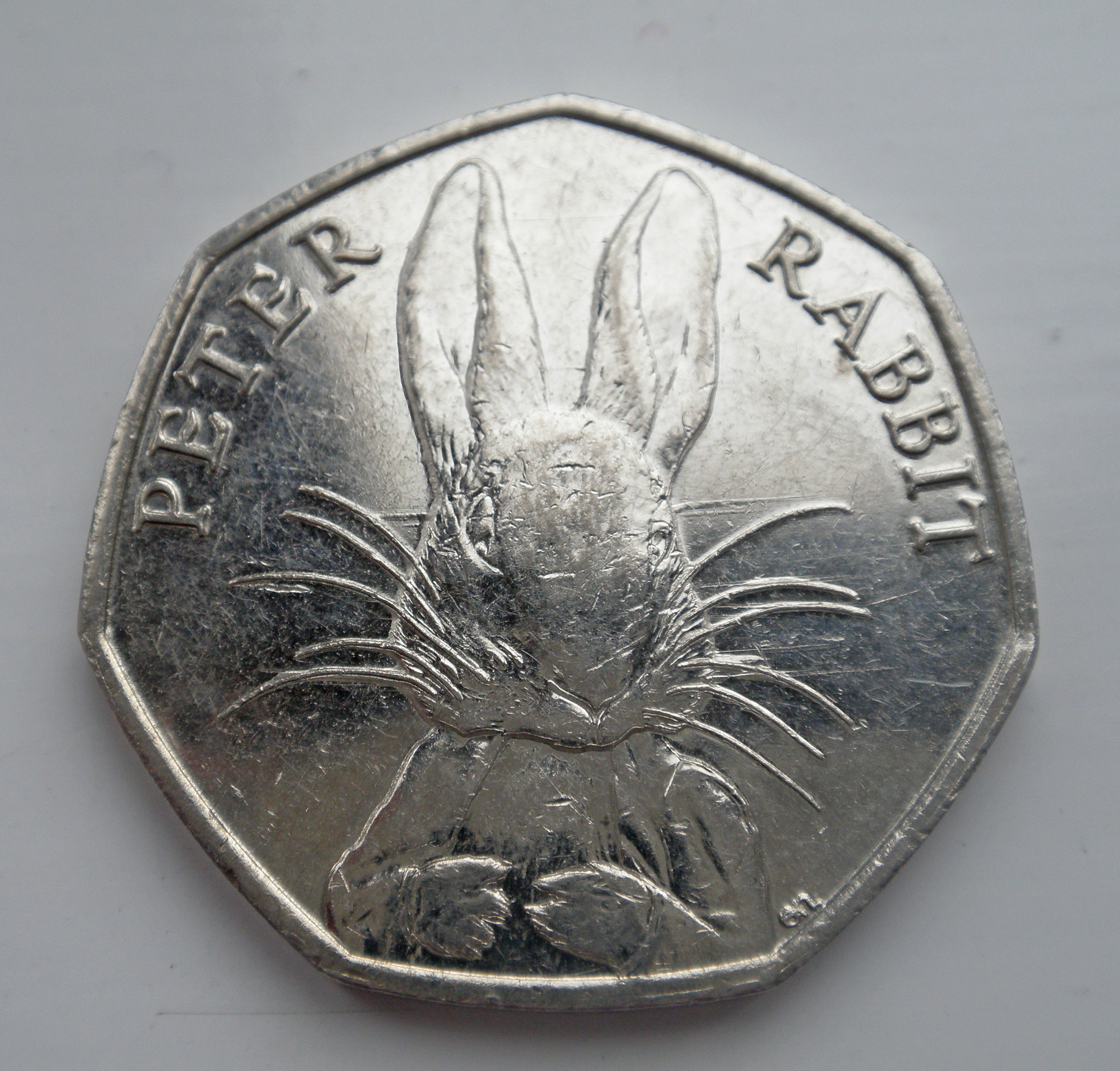
British fifty pence coin reverse in 2016 with a depiction of Peter Rabbit, marking the 150th anniversary of Potter's birth.

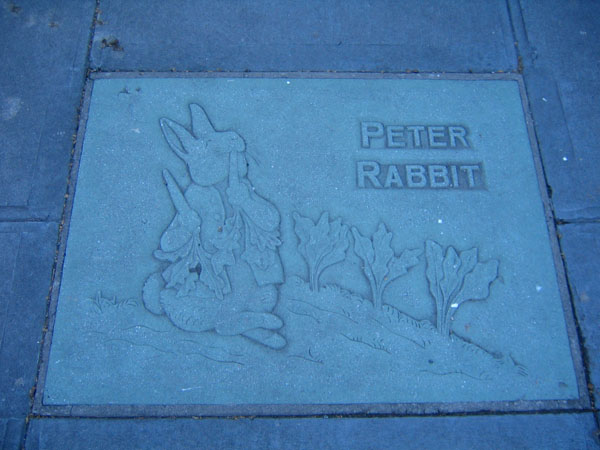
Peter Rabbit commemoration in East 21st Street, New York City

In 2015, a manuscript for an unpublished book was discovered by Jo Hanks, a publisher at Penguin Random House Children's Books, in the Victoria and Albert Museum archive. The book The Tale of Kitty-in-Boots, with illustrations by Quentin Blake, was published 1 September 2016, to mark the 150th anniversary of Potter's birth. Also in 2016, Peter Rabbit was depicted on the reverse of a British fifty pence coin, and Peter along with other Potter characters featured on a series of UK postage stamps issued by the Royal Mail.

In 2017, The Art of Beatrix Potter: Sketches, Paintings, and Illustrations by Emily Zach was published after San Francisco publisher Chronicle Books decided to mark the 150th anniversary of Beatrix Potter's birth by showing that she was "far more than a 19th-century weekend painter. She was an artist of astonishing range."

In December 2017, the asteroid 13975 Beatrixpotter, discovered by Belgian astronomer Eric Elst in 1992, was renamed in her memory.

=== Exhibition: Beatrix Potter: Drawn to Nature ===
In 2022, an exhibition entitled Beatrix Potter: Drawn to Nature was held at the Victoria and Albert Museum. Research for the exhibition identified the man's court waistcoat c. 1780s, which inspired Potter's sketch in The Tailor of Gloucester. The exhibition traveled to the High Museum of Art in Atlanta where it was shown October 13, 2023 – January 7, 2024. In 2024, the exhibition travelled to the Morgan Library & Museum in New York. New York Family stressed its emotional resonance, quoting curator Philip Palmer's reaction to seeing Mr. Jeremy Fisher at the entrance as "like seeing an old friend again".

== Analysis ==
There are many interpretations of Potter's literary work, the sources of her art, and her life and times. These include critical evaluations of her corpus of children's literature and Modernist interpretations of Humphrey Carpenter and Katherine Chandler. Judy Taylor, That Naughty Rabbit: Beatrix Potter and Peter Rabbit (rev. 2002) tells the story of the first publication and many editions.

Potter's country life, her farming and role as a landscape preservationist are discussed in the work of Matthew Kelly, The Women Who Saved the English Countryside (2022). See also Susan Denyer and authors in the publications of The National Trust, such as Beatrix Potter at Home in the Lake District (2004).

Potter's work as a scientific illustrator and her work in mycology are discussed in Linda Lear's books Beatrix Potter: A Life in Nature (2006) and Beatrix Potter: The Extraordinary Life of a Victorian Genius (2008).

== Adaptations ==
In 1971, a ballet film was released, The Tales of Beatrix Potter, directed by Reginald Mills, set to music by John Lanchbery with choreography by Frederick Ashton, and performed in character costume by members of the Royal Ballet and the Royal Opera House orchestra. The ballet of the same name has been performed by other dance companies around the world.

In 1992, Potter's children's book The Tale of Benjamin Bunny was featured in the film Lorenzo's Oil.

Potter is also featured in Susan Wittig Albert's series of light mysteries called The Cottage Tales of Beatrix Potter. The first of the eight-book series is Tale of Hill Top Farm (2004), which deals with Potter's life in the Lake District and the village of Near Sawrey between 1905 and 1913.

== In film ==
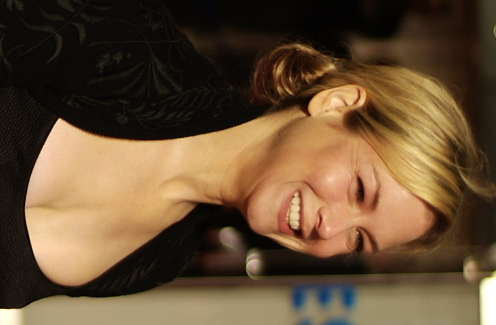
Renée Zellweger (who starred as Beatrix Potter) at the premiere of Miss Potter in December 2006

In 1982, the BBC produced The Tale of Beatrix Potter. This dramatization of her life was written by John Hawkesworth, directed by Bill Hayes, and starred Holly Aird and Penelope Wilton as the young and adult Potter, respectively. The World of Peter Rabbit and Friends, a TV series based on fourteen of her twenty-four stories, starred actress Niamh Cusack as Beatrix Potter.

In 1993, Weston Woods Studios made an almost hour non-story film called Beatrix Potter: Artist, Storyteller, and Countrywoman with narration by Lynn Redgrave. In 2006, Chris Noonan directed Miss Potter, a biographical film of Potter's life focusing on her early career and romance with her editor Norman Warne. The film stars Renée Zellweger as Beatrix Potter, Ewan McGregor as Norman Warne, and Emily Watson as Warne's sister.

On 9 February 2018, Columbia Pictures released Peter Rabbit, directed by Will Gluck, based on the work by Potter. The character Bea, played by Rose Byrne, is a re-imagined version of Potter. A sequel to the film titled Peter Rabbit 2: The Runaway was released in 2021.

On 24 December 2020, Sky One premiered Roald & Beatrix: The Tail of the Curious Mouse, a made-for-television drama film inspired by the true story of a six-year-old Roald Dahl meeting his idol Potter. Set in 1922, the movie was written by Abigail Wilson, directed by David Kerr and starred Dawn French as Beatrix Potter, Rob Brydon as William Heelis and Jessica Hynes as Sofie Dahl. Filming took place in Wales, the birthland of Dahl, French and Brydon. This production incorporates live action, stop motion, and puppetry. The DVD was released on 26 April 2021.

== Publications ==
=== The 23 Tales ===
No.	Classic Tales No. (Note: The modern numbering of books in the series is not in publication date order)	Title	Publication Year
1	1	The Tale of Peter Rabbit (Note: Privately printed, 250 copies, 1901; printed in a trade edition by Frederick Warne & Co. in 1902)	1902
2	2	The Tale of Squirrel Nutkin	1903
3	3	The Tailor of Gloucester (Note: Privately printed by the author in 1902, and published in a trade edition by Frederick Warne & Co. in 1903)	1903
4	4	The Tale of Benjamin Bunny	1904
5	5	The Tale of Two Bad Mice	1904
6	6	The Tale of Mrs. Tiggy-Winkle	1905
7	17	The Tale of the Pie and the Patty-Pan	1905
8	7	The Tale of Mr. Jeremy Fisher	1906
9	20	The Story of a Fierce Bad Rabbit	1906
10	21	The Story of Miss Moppet	1906
11	8	The Tale of Tom Kitten	1907
12	9	The Tale of Jemima Puddle-Duck	1908
13	16	The Tale of Samuel Whiskers or, The Roly-Poly Pudding	1908
14	10	The Tale of the Flopsy Bunnies	1909
15	18	The Tale of Ginger and Pickles	1909
16	11	The Tale of Mrs. Tittlemouse	1910
17	12	The Tale of Timmy Tiptoes	1911
18	14	The Tale of Mr. Tod	1912
19	15	The Tale of Pigling Bland	1913
20	22	Appley Dapply's Nursery Rhymes	1917
21	13	The Tale of Johnny Town-Mouse	1918
22	23	Cecily Parsley's Nursery Rhymes	1922
23	19	The Tale of Little Pig Robinson	1930

=== Other books ===
1. Peter Rabbit's Painting Book (1911)
2. Tom Kitten's Painting Book (1917)
3. Jemima Puddle-Duck's Painting Book (1925)
4. Peter Rabbit's Almanac for 1929 (1928)
5. The Fairy Caravan (1929)
6. Sister Anne (illustrated by Katharine Sturges) (1932)
7. Wag-by-Wall (decorations by J. J. Lankes) (1944)
8. The Tale of the Faithful Dove (illustrated by Marie Angel) (1955, 1970)
9. The Sly Old Cat (written 1906; first published 1971)
10. The Tale of Tuppenny (illustrated by Marie Angel) (1973)
11. The Tale of Kitty-in-Boots (2016) (Illustrated by Quentin Blake.)
12. Red Riding Hood (2019) (Illustrated by Helen Oxenbury.)
