= The Tale of Johnny Town-Mouse =

Children's book by Beatrix Potter

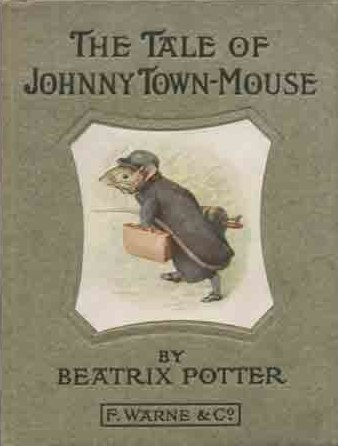
- First edition cover
- Author: Beatrix Potter
- Illustrator: Beatrix Potter
- Language: English
- Genre: Children's literature
- Publisher: Frederick Warne & Co.
- Publication date: December 1918
- Publication place: United Kingdom
- Media type: Print (originally hardcover, but since printed in softcover as well)
- Preceded by: Appley Dapply's Nursery Rhymes
- Followed by: Cecily Parsley's Nursery Rhymes
- Text: The Tale of Johnny Town-Mouse at Wikisource

The Tale of Johnny Town-Mouse is a children's book written and illustrated by Beatrix Potter and first published by Frederick Warne & Co. In December 1918. The tale is based on the Aesop fable, "The Town Mouse and the Country Mouse", with details taken from Horace's Satires 2.6.79-117. It tells of a country mouse and a city mouse who visit each other in their respective homes. After sampling the other's way of life, both express a decided preference for their own. The book was adapted to a BBC television animated series.

== Plot summary ==
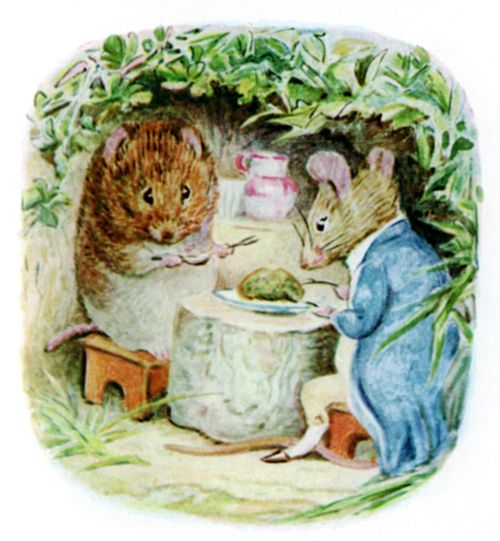
Johnny Town-Mouse visiting the country mouse Timmy Willie

The country mouse, Timmy Willie, falls asleep in a hamper, and is carried with the vegetables to the city, where the mice, including Johnny Town-Mouse, make him welcome, but finding the cat frightening and the food strange, he returns by the hamper. Sometime later, Johnny Town-Mouse pays him a visit, but finding such things as cows and lawnmowers frightening, returns to the city himself.

== Adaptations ==
An animated adaptation of the story, shown alongside The Tale of Two Bad Mice, was featured on The World of Peter Rabbit and Friends in 1995 with Johnny Town-Mouse voiced by British actor Hugh Laurie.
