= Frederick Warne & Co. =

British publisher

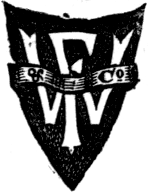
- Parent company: Random House Children's Books
- Founded: July 1865; 160 years ago
- Founder: Frederick Warne
- Country of origin: United Kingdom
- Headquarters location: London
- Official website: penguin.com/frederick-warne

Frederick Warne & Co. is a British publisher founded in 1865. It is known for children's books, particularly those of Beatrix Potter, and for its Observer's Books.

Warne is an imprint of Random House Children's Books and Penguin Random House, a subsidiary of German media conglomerate Bertelsmann.

== History ==
From Nursery Rhymes.

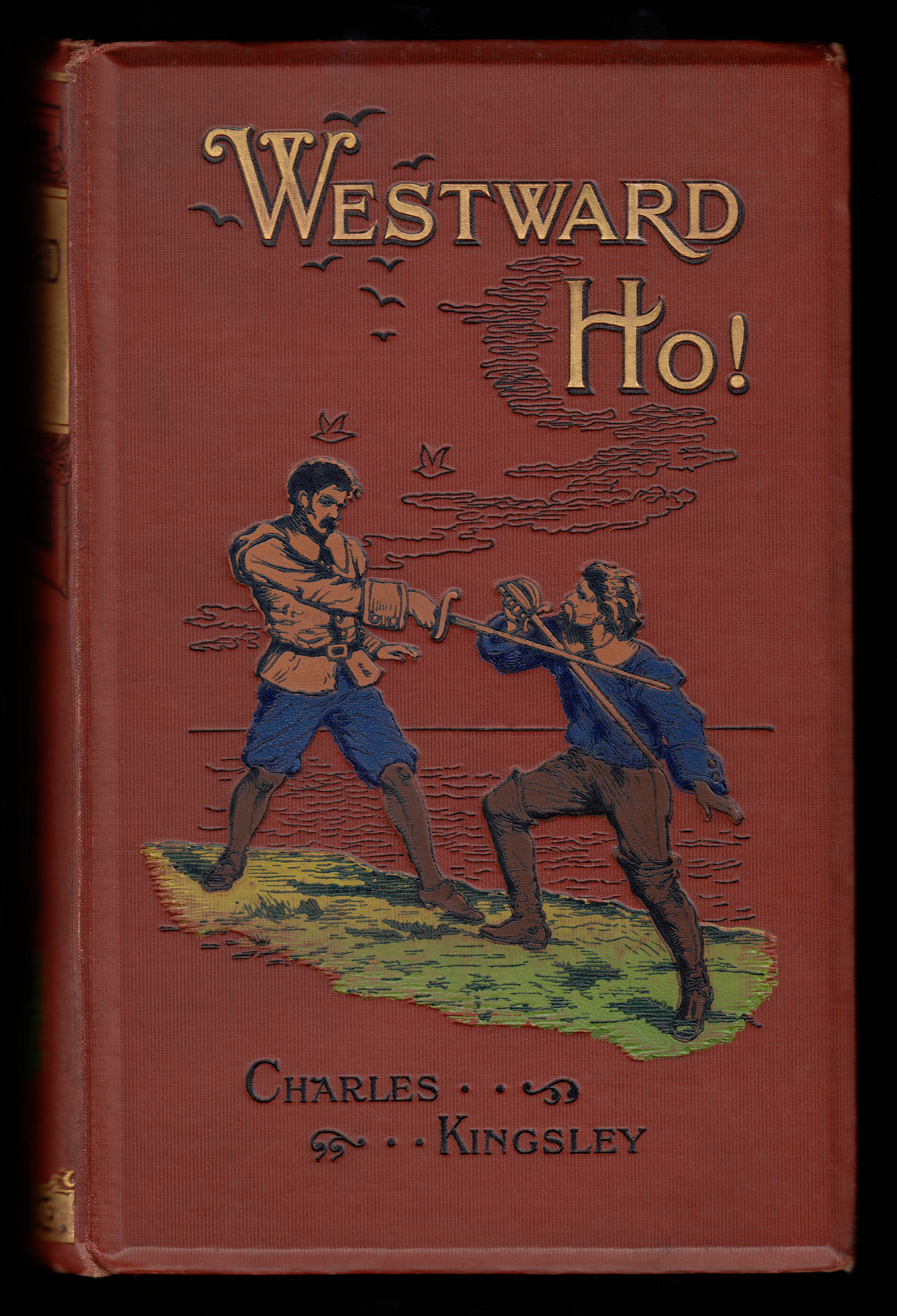
1899 printing of Charles Kingsley's Westward Ho!

Frederick Warne & Co. was founded in Covent Garden in July 1865 by London bookseller and publisher, Frederick Warne. The business was one successor to Routledge, Warne, Routledge (thus from 1858), the publishing partnership of Warne with his brother-in-law George Routledge and the eldest of Routledge's sons. The other successor was George Routledge & Sons.

During the second half of the nineteenth century, the company built a reputation for publishing children's books, publishing illustrated books by well-known authors and artists as Edward Lear, Kate Greenaway and Walter Crane. The company also published a 'Pictorial' series of books of collections of short essays and illustrations on many non-fiction topics. The following list may not be complete.

Pictorial Cabinet of Marvels
Pictorial Chronicles of the Mighty Deep
Pictorial Museum of Sport and Adventure
Pictorial Records of Remarkable Events
Pictorial Stories of Heroism and Enterprise
Pictorial Travels on Land and Sea
Pictorial Treasury of Famous Men and Famous Deeds
The Pictorial Tour of the World

Another book series, the Warne's Star Series, was being published in the 1880s.

Toward the end of the century, Frederick Warne had retired and left the firm to his three sons, Harold, Fruing and Norman. Warne was among the six publishers to whom Beatrix Potter submitted her first book, the story of a rabbit called Peter. Like the other five firms, Warne turned the proposal down. But the people at the firm changed their minds when they saw the privately published copy in 1901. They said they would publish the book, as long as the illustrations were drawn in colour. The next year, Warne published The Tale of Peter Rabbit, and by Christmas it had sold 20,000 copies. This began a 40-year partnership that saw the publication of 22 additional little books. Beatrix Potter was engaged to marry Norman Warne, her editor and the youngest of the three Warne brothers. However, he died tragically in 1905, only a few weeks after their engagement. Harold, the eldest brother, took over as Potter's editor. She continued to produce one or two new Little Books each year for the next eight years until her marriage in 1913 to William Heelis. During the next few years, Potter turned her attention to her farm work, but when the company fell on hard times and Harold was imprisoned for embezzlement, she came to the rescue with another new title to support "the old firm." Potter, who had no children, left the rights to her works to Warne upon her death. The company continued to publish them; it also brought out several biographical works about its most renowned author. Over the years, Warne also expanded its nonfiction publishing, issuing among others the Observer's Books.

In 1983, Warne was bought by Penguin Books. It began developing classic book-based children's character brands. The merchandising program was expanded from a base of thirty-five licenses to more than four hundred by the late 1990s. Over the years, Warne acquired a variety of other classic books.

A film about the life of Beatrix Potter Miss Potter, starring Renée Zellweger as Beatrix Potter and Ewan McGregor as Norman Warne was released in 2006. While the company no longer exists as an independent company, it continues to exist as an imprint of Penguin Group. The company collaborated with Sony Pictures Animation and Animal Logic to produce the Peter Rabbit film, which was released in 2018.

== Beatrix Potter books ==
From 1902 to 1930 Warne published twenty-three story books written and illustrated for children by Beatrix Potter. Primarily they feature anthropomorphic animals, such as Peter Rabbit in the first of the series, The Tale of Peter Rabbit. Here they are listed by year of the first edition.

- The Tale of Peter Rabbit (1902)
- The Tale of Squirrel Nutkin (1903)
- The Tailor of Gloucester (1903)
- The Tale of Benjamin Bunny (1904)
- The Tale of Two Bad Mice (1904)
- The Tale of Mrs. Tiggy-Winkle (1905)
- The Tale of the Pie and the Patty-Pan (1905)
- The Tale of Mr. Jeremy Fisher (1906)
- The Story of A Fierce Bad Rabbit (1906)
- The Story of Miss Moppet (1906)
- The Tale of Tom Kitten (1907)
- The Tale of Jemima Puddle-Duck (1908)
- The Tale of Samuel Whiskers or, The Roly-Poly Pudding (1908)
- The Tale of the Flopsy Bunnies (1909)
- The Tale of Ginger and Pickles (1909)
- The Tale of Mrs. Tittlemouse (1910)
- The Tale of Timmy Tiptoes (1911)
- The Tale of Mr. Tod (1912)
- The Tale of Pigling Bland (1913)
- Appley Dapply's Nursery Rhymes (1917)
- The Tale of Johnny Town-Mouse (1918)
- Cecily Parsley's Nursery Rhymes (1922)
- The Tale of Little Pig Robinson (1930)

Warne also published the first British edition of one longer children's book written and illustrated by Potter.

- The Fairy Caravan (1952); US edition, 1929

== Observer's Books ==
From 1937 to 2003, Warne published small, pocket-sized books, which considered many subjects. The aim of these books were to interest the observer known as the Observer's books. These books were intended for children.

For the dedicated collector this could be a lifetime's work as there are over 800 variations, some of which are now very rare. The values of the books can vary from 50p to hundreds of pounds. They all include a variety of topics, which include hobbies, art, history, wildlife and many others. The earlier books were printed with paper dust covers up until 1969. These were good for printing but were not very practical because they were very delicate and were easy to rip and stain. From 1970, the covers were protected with a glossy coating. This helped the dust covers protection. These types are often referred to as Glossies. From the late 1970s, Warne decided to laminate the covers to the actual books, so the books were highly protected as they did not really have any covers. The dust covers from 1937 to 1970 had designs that were colourful and attractive as each one had its own unique colouring of squiggly lines at the top. In 1971, Warne decided to refurbish its books with a more formal dust jacket. These were good but it lost the charm that the original covers had had. The first Observer guide was published in 1937, and was on the subject of British Birds. This is now very rare, and a mint copy with a dust cover is worth hundreds of pounds. The same year, Warne published a second book, on British Wild Flowers, a mint copy of this book is worth around £220.

By 1941, Warne had published the first six Observer's books. In 1942, a special edition book was brought out on Airplanes. This book had no number in the series, as it was bought out to help people spot enemy planes during World War 2. It was printed again in 1943 and in 1945. When Warne was acquired by Penguin books in 1983, Warne bought out new editions of the Observer's books. These were slightly bigger than the earlier editions and were in paperback, not hardback. The same year Penguin started printing their own, more up to date Observer's books. These again were slightly larger than the originals but were hardbacks. Like the later original Observers books, the dust cover was laminated to the actual book. There were two types of the Penguin Observers books, Bloomsbury Observers, and Claremont Observers, (of which there were only 12 different editions).

== Book series ==
- The Afternoon Tea Toy Books
- Albion Edition
- The Arundel Poets
- Beatrix Potter Designer Editions
- Beatrix Potter First Board Books
- Beatrix Potter's Country World
- Beetles Of The British Isles
- The Birds of the British Isles
- The Birds of the British Isles and their Eggs
- Boys' and Girls' Gift Books
- The Caterpillars of the British Butterflies
- Cavendish Library
- Century Library
- Chandos Classics AKA The Chandos Library
- Chandos Poets
- The "Come-With-Me" Books
- Doust's Art Manuals
- Doust Sketch Books
- The Druid Sporting Series
- The Dumpty Books
- Ellen Montgomery's Bookshelf
- The Falcon Nature Stories
- Famous Regiments
- Flower Fairies (originally published by Blackie and Son)
- The Forget Me Not Series
- Frederick Warne Key Series
- Half-Hours
- Home Acting for Amateurs
- Home & Farm Pictures
- The Homeland Handbooks (joint publisher: The Homeland Association Ltd.)
- The Homeland Pocket Books
- The Imperial Library
- The Imperial Poets
- J. D. Harding's Art Manuals
- The Jimmy Linnet Books
- Kate Greenaway's Picture Books
- Ladybird Series
- Lansdowne Fairy Library
- The Landsdowne Poets
- The Leatherstocking Tales
- Leslie Brooke's Children's Series
- Leslie Brooke's Little Books
- The Library of Natural History Romance
- Little Spot Board Book
- Louie Swann Readers
- Mes six petits livres illustrés
- Mother Nature Series
- The Moths of the British Isles
- The Mrs. Books
- The Mr. and Mrs. Books
- Nature Field Series
- Nature Roundabout Series
- Nature's Treasure Series
- New Observer's Books
- Noo-Zoo Tales
- Notable Novels
- Nursery Rhymes
- Observer's Books
- Observer's Guides (AKA Observer's Guides: Where Is It? Series)
- Orlando, the Marmalade Cat
- Our Home Railways
- Olyslager Auto Library
- Out of the Ark
- Paragon Library
- Peter Rabbit series (AKA The Tales of Peter Rabbit series, the Beatrix Potter series, and the Little Books)
- Pictorial series
- Playhour Picture Books (AKA Warne's Playhour Picture Books)
- The Prettimouse Series
- The Private Lives of Animals Series
- The Prize Library
- Public Men of To-day
- Science Simplified
- R. Caldecott's Picture Books
- Round the Globe Stories
- Royal Fairy Library
- The Rummy Tales Series
- Spot (written and illustrated by Eric Hill)
- Spurbooks Venture Guide AKA Spur Books Venture Guide
- Storyland
- The Story of Industry Series
- Stuff and Nonsense Books
- Sunbeam Stories
- Tales of the Wild Folk
- Teddy Bear books
- Traditions of Lancashire
- The Treasure Library
- Twins series
- Warne's Adventure Library
- Warne's Arts and Crafts Series
- Warne Classics Series
- Warne Gerrard Guides for Walkers: Walks for Motorists Series (AKA Walks for Motorists: Warne Gerrard Guides for Walkers Series)
- Warne's Colonial Library
- Warne's Cosy Corner Books
- Warne's Crown Library
- Warne's Daring Deeds Library
- Warne's Excelsior Playmates
- Warne's Excelsior Toy Books
- Warne's Information Series
- Warne's Learn to Draw Folders
- Warne's Magnet Library
- Warne's Novelist's Library
- Warne's Now and Then Juvenile Series
- Warne's Picture Puzzle Toy Books
- Warne's Recreation Books
- Warne's Star Series
- Warne's Supplementary Readers
- Warne's Transport Library
- Warne's Untearable Gift Books
- Warne's Useful Books
- Warne's Welcome Books
- Warne's Zig-Zag Books
- The Wayside and Woodland Series
- Wild Flowers

=== Aunt Louisa series ===
The author of the titles in these series was Aunt Louisa, the pen name of Laura Valentine.

- Aunt Louisa's Ideal Painting Books
- Aunt Louisa's "Model" Painting Books
- Aunt Louisa's Playtime Toy Books
- Aunt Louisa's London Toy Books
- Aunt Louisa's Sunday Books
