= The Tale of Little Pig Robinson =

Children's book by Beatrix Potter

- Author: Beatrix Potter
- Illustrator: Beatrix Potter
- Language: English
- Genre: Children's literature
- Publisher: Frederick Warne & Co (UK); McKay (USA)
- Publication date: September 1930
- Publication place: England
- Media type: Print (Hardcover)
- ISBN: 978-0723247883
- Preceded by: The Fairy Caravan
- Followed by: Sister Anne

The Tale of Little Pig Robinson is a children's book written and illustrated by Beatrix Potter as part of the Peter Rabbit series. The book contains eight chapters and numerous illustrations. Though the book was one of Potter's last publications in 1930, it was one of the first stories she wrote.

== Overview ==
Potter introduces the story as her explanation of how the pig from Edward Lear's poem "The Owl and the Pussycat" comes to travel to the "land where the Bong-Tree grows".

Little Pig Robinson's aunts, Miss Porcas and Miss Dorcas, send him to the market to sell produce from their farm and purchase certain items they need. On his way home from the market, Little Pig Robinson is stopped by a sailor who offers him an array of goods and an opportunity to travel. Little Pig Robinson agrees to the sailor's offer and goes with the sailor to the ship. There, the sailor tells Little Pig Robinson to go down and help himself to "muffins and crumpets". The sailors then leave the dock and Little Pig Robinson quickly realizes he has been kidnapped. He further realizes that the sailor he had met at the market was in truth the ship's cook who had planned to turn Little Pig Robinson into a fine feast for the ship's men.

With the help of the ship's resident cat, Little Pig Robinson escapes in a rowing boat and finds his way to "the land where the Bong-Tree grows". Some time later Pig Robinson meets the Owl and the Pussycat there.

== Composition history ==
Potter began writing The Tale of Little Pig Robinson in 1893 after a holiday to Falmouth and other coastal towns, in particular Hastings where she gained inspiration from the landscape. Pig Robinson was written as a prequel to Edward Lear's poem "The Owl and the Pussycat", which Potter would illustrate in 1897. Potter also used elements of Daniel Defoe's Robinson Crusoe and her own stories about her pet pigs. While writing The Tale of Little Pig Robinson, Potter drew some of her first drawings in her journal, including character sketches and literary portraits. The book was initially rejected by the publisher Frederick Warne & Co. due to its length and lack of illustrations—a result of the story's division into chapters. The story was first published in September 1930 in Britain by Frederick Warne & Co. and in America by David McKay Publications after both companies encouraged her to release a new book in 1929. After receiving the request, Potter revised the manuscript and illustrations for the publication, but her story faced delays due to Potter having a case of bronchitis. When the book was finally published, it was much more popular in Britain than America and required several reprints to meet demand. Potter took the income from the sales of The Tale of Little Pig Robinson to purchase the Monk Conniston Estate as an investment.

== Critical response ==
The Tale of Little Pig Robinson has been called a conventional narrative when compared to some of Potter's latter literary efforts, lacking the concentrated intensity of her other writing. Due to the book being illustrated after Potter wrote it, the story has been criticised for being unnecessarily long. The elements of social criticism in the text have been seen to contrast against the humorous nature of the book.

== Adaptations ==
A 1990 British television movie adaptation of The Tale of Little Pig Robinson was produced by Dreamscape Company. The adaptation was directed by Alan Bridges and starred Timothy Spall as Pig Robinson, with Dawn French and Jennifer Saunders as aunts Porcas and Dorcas respectively, Edward Fox as the ship's captain, Barnabas Butcher, and Toyah Willcox as the ship's cat.

== See also ==
- Charlotte's Web
- The Tale of Pigling Bland
- List of fictional pigs
