= Appley Dapply's Nursery Rhymes =

Children's book by Beatrix Potter

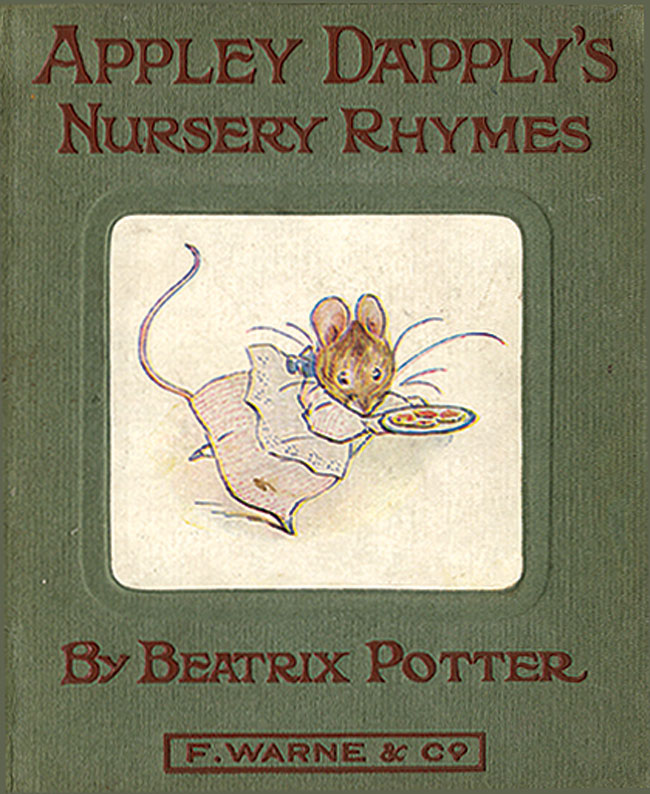
- First edition cover
- Author: Beatrix Potter
- Illustrator: Beatrix Potter
- Language: English
- Genre: Children's literature
- Publisher: Frederick Warne & Co.
- Publication date: October 1917
- Publication place: England
- Media type: Print (Hardcover)
- Preceded by: The Tale of Pigling Bland
- Followed by: The Tale of Johnny Town-Mouse
- Text: Appley Dapply's; Nursery Rhymes at Wikisource

Appley Dapply's Nursery Rhymes is the first of two collections of nursery rhymes written and illustrated by Beatrix Potter. It was first published in 1917. The title character is a brown mouse who takes food out of a cupboard in someone else's house.
