= The Tale of Pigling Bland =

1913 children's book by Beatrix Potter

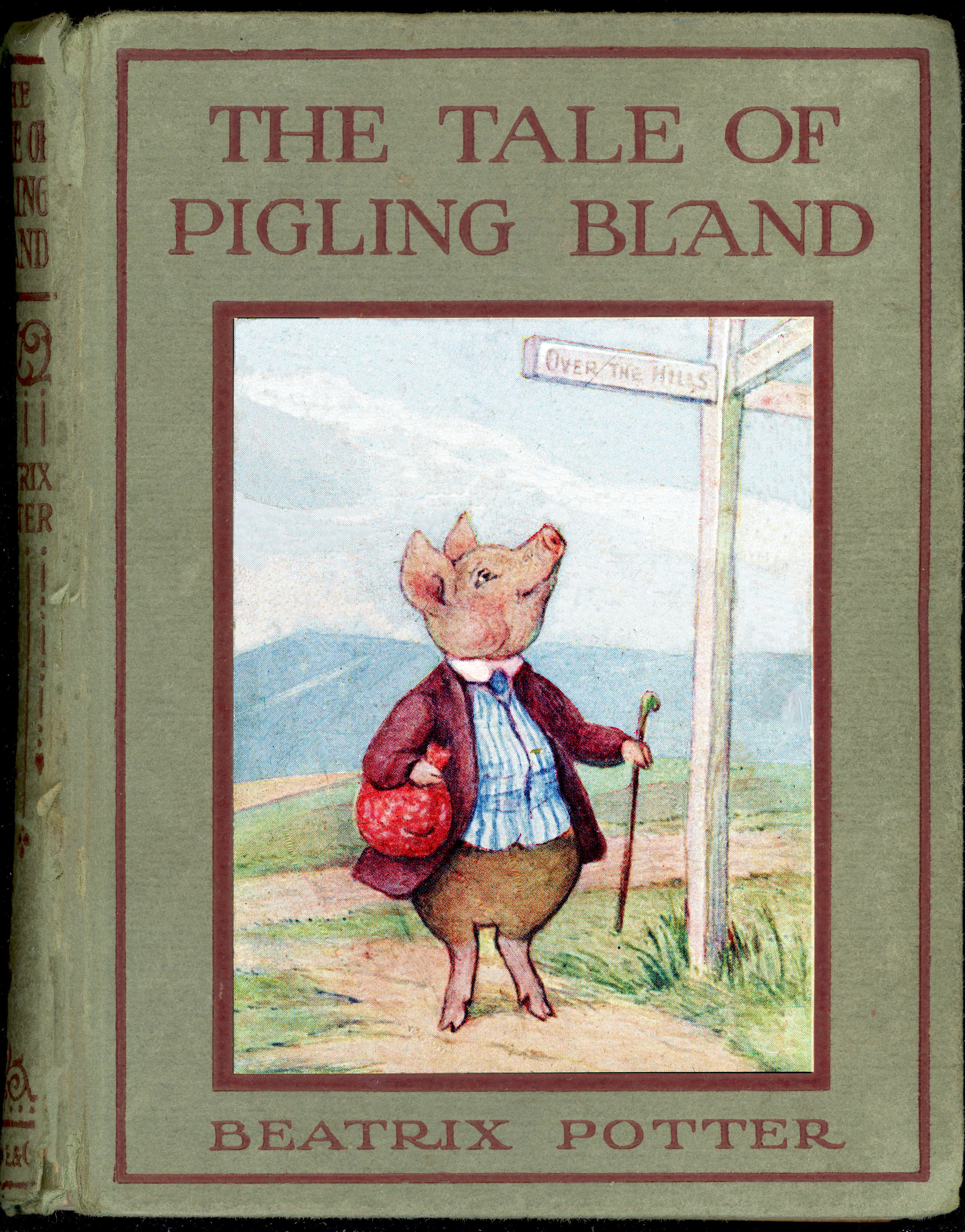
- First edition cover
- Author: Beatrix Potter
- Illustrator: Beatrix Potter
- Language: English
- Genre: Children's literature
- Publisher: Frederick Warne & Co
- Publication date: 1913
- Publication place: England
- Media type: Print (hardcover)
- Preceded by: The Tale of Mr. Tod
- Followed by: Appley Dapply's Nursery Rhymes
- Text: The Tale of Pigling Bland at Wikisource

The Tale of Pigling Bland is a children's book written and illustrated by Beatrix Potter and first published by Frederick Warne & Co. in 1913. The story describes the adventures of the eponymous pig and how his life changes upon meeting a soulmate, in much the same way that Potter's life was changing at the time the book was published.

== Plot ==
Aunt Pettitoes, an old Large White sow, can no longer cope with her eight troublemaking offspring and thus makes them leave home, with the exception of a well-behaved sow named Spot. Two of them, boars named Pigling Bland and Alexander, go to market with licences to attend those in Lancashire. Aunt Pettitoes gives them warnings and peppermints as a farewell but also tells them that if they go past the county boundary, they will not be able come back. Pigling Bland is very sensible but the more frivolous Alexander loses his pig licence and, when he fails to produce it for a passing policeman, is made to return to the farm.

Reluctantly going on alone, Pigling Bland later finds the missing papers, which ended up in his pocket as a result of an earlier scuffle with Alexander. He tries to find his brother but ends up getting lost in the woods and has to spend the night in a stranger's chicken coop. He is found in the morning by a gruff farmer, Peter Thomas Piperson, who allows him to stay in his house, but Pigling is not sure the farmer is trustworthy.

His fears are quickly confirmed when he discovers that Piperson has a second pig in his house who was stolen from her owner and whom he intends to turn into bacon and ham. The second pig, a beautiful black Berkshire sow named Pig-wig, suggests they run away so that they won't be sold, or worse, eaten. Pigling Bland has in any case decided to avoid the market and become a potato farmer instead.

At dawn the pair sneak out but in the course of their escape they come across a grocer in a cart who recognises Pig-wig as the recently stolen pig for whom a reward has been issued. By being co-operative, and with Pigling Bland faking a limp, the two pigs manage to gain time and, once the grocer is at a safe distance, flee to the county boundary to Westmorland and finally, over the hills and far away, where they dance to celebrate their new-found freedom.

== Inspirations ==
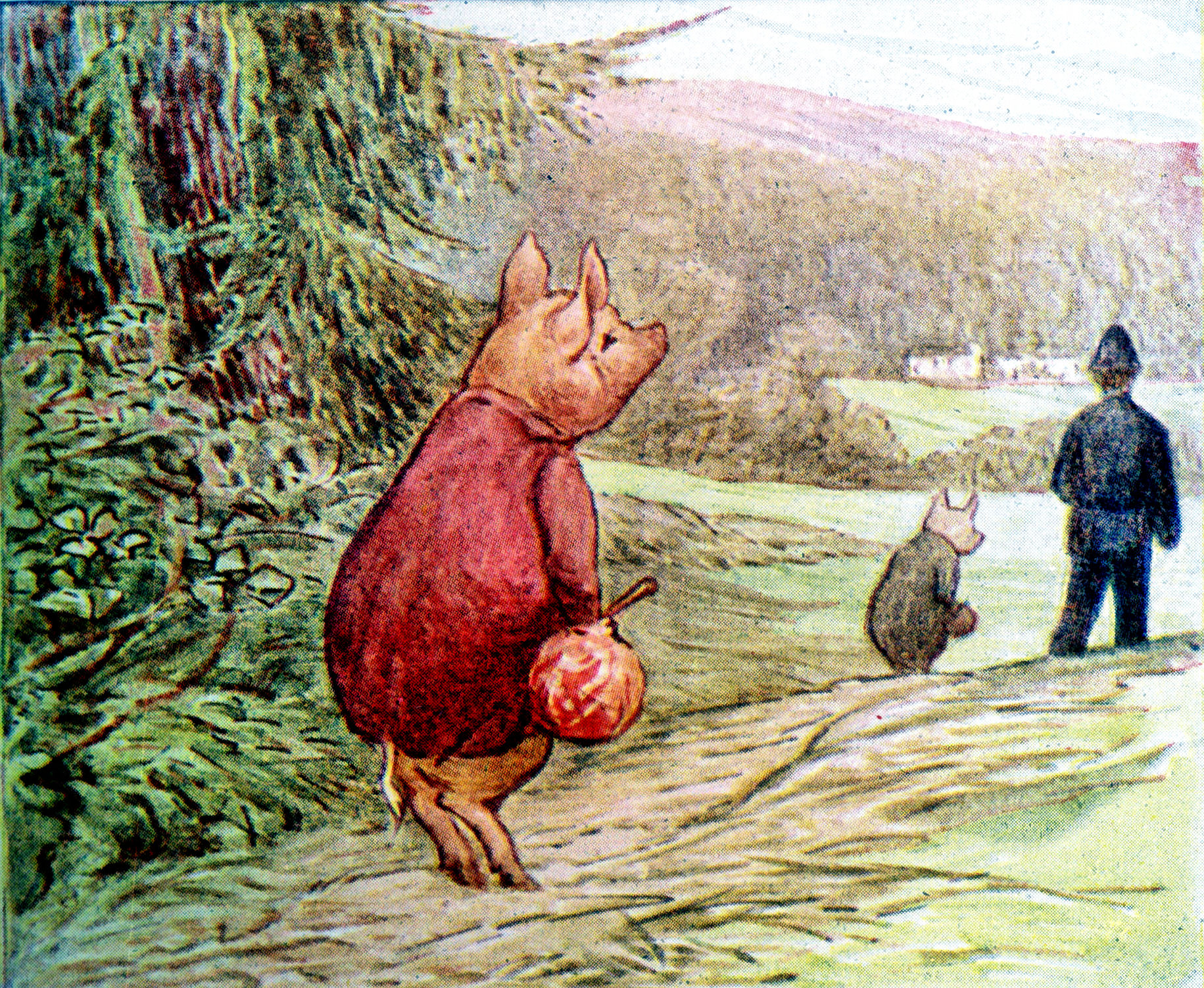
Pigling Bland watches as a policeman takes his brother Alexander away, leaving him on his own.

Beatrix Potter owned a farm called Hill Top which she had bought thanks to the success of her early books. The farm and its house featured in several of her stories and included a number of pigs. In a letter written in 1909 to her friend Millie Warne, sister of her late fiancé Norman, Potter describes the sale of two such pigs whose "appetites were fearful – five meals a day and not satisfied." She started work on the book at around this time.

Pig-wig was inspired by a Berkshire pig which Potter had acquired from a farmer called Townley. John Cannon, the manager of Potter's farm, had objected to having a black pig on the farm so Potter kept her as a pet, describing her as "very friendly" and "likes being tickled under the chin." The story was dedicated to Townley's children: "For Cecily and Charlie. A Tale of The Christmas Pig."

The story was completed and published in 1913, though Potter had had a busy year, coping with illness, her forthcoming marriage to William Heelis and their move to the larger Castle Cottage. Critics have suggested that the theme of a couple starting a whole new life reflected Potter's own circumstances.

== Composition ==
Many of the landscapes and areas in the story were based on parts of the Lake District. A black-and-white drawing of Pigling Bland and Pig-wig, arm in arm, shows them watching the sun rise over a part of Westmorland. In a letter to a fan, Potter denied that the pigs were "a portrait of me and Mr Heelis [...] When I want to put William in a book – it will have to be as some very tall thin animal." The pigs are also shown crossing a local humpback bridge.

Potter included herself in the illustrations and as the narrator. Although she had no children of her own she describes herself as harshly disciplining two of Pigling Bland's sisters in an apparent approval of corporal punishment. In a letter to Millie Warne, she actually describes herself as sketching a pig in a pig sty. She even mentions how the pig tried "to nibble my boots, which is interrupting."

A local man with his horse and cart posed for a photo from which Potter made a colour illustration of the pig's meeting with the grocer.

The signpost on the front cover is a replica of one within walking distance of Beatrix Potter's farm.

== Adaptations ==
- In 1971 the tale became a segment in the Royal Ballet film, The Tales of Beatrix Potter.
- In 1994 an animated film adaptation was featured on the BBC television anthology series The World of Peter Rabbit and Friends, with the voices of Pam Ferris as Aunt Pettitoes and Josie Lawrence as Pig-wig.
- The Tale of Pigling Bland was first performed as a musical theatre production on 6 July 2006 at the Toronto Fringe Festival in Toronto, Ontario, Canada.
- The Tale of Pigling Bland, adapted and directed by Sean Grundy and starring Johnny Vegas as Pigling Bland and Morwenna Banks as Alexander, was broadcast by BBC Radio 4 on 23 December 2013 as part of the 15-minute Drama series.
- Pigling Bland appears in the 2018 animated/live-action film adaptation of Peter Rabbit and its 2021 sequel, voiced by Ewen Leslie.

== See also ==
- The Tale of Little Pig Robinson
- List of fictional pigs
