= The Tale of the Pie and the Patty-Pan =

Children's book by Beatrix Potter

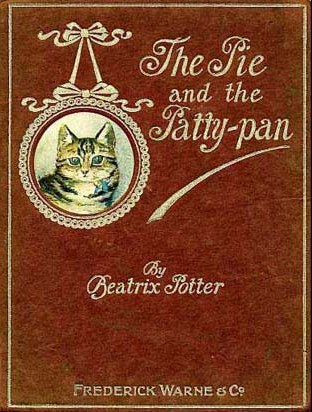
- First edition cover
- Author: Beatrix Potter
- Illustrator: Beatrix Potter
- Language: English
- Genre: Children's literature
- Publisher: Frederick Warne & Co.
- Publication date: October 1905
- Publication place: England
- Media type: Print (hardcover)
- OCLC: 12533701
- Preceded by: The Tale of Mrs. Tiggy-Winkle
- Followed by: The Tale of Mr. Jeremy Fisher
- Text: The Tale of the Pie and the Patty-Pan at Wikisource

The Tale of the Pie and the Patty-Pan (originally, The Pie and the Patty-Pan) is a children's book written and illustrated by Beatrix Potter, and published by Frederick Warne & Co. in October 1905. It tells of a cat called Ribby and a tea party she holds for a dog called Duchess. Complications arise when Duchess tries to replace Ribby's mouse pie with her own veal and ham pie, and then believes she has swallowed a small tin pastry form called a patty-pan. Its themes are etiquette and social relations in a small town.

A version of the tale was composed by Potter in 1903, but set aside to develop other projects. In 1904, she failed to complete a book of nursery rhymes for Warnes, and the 1903 tale was accepted in its stead. Potter elaborated its setting and storyline, and developed the tale more fully before publication. The illustrations depict the cottages and gardens of Sawrey, a village in the Lake District near Potter's Hill Top farm, and have been described as some of the most exquisite Potter ever produced. Ribby was modelled on a cat living in Sawrey, Duchess on two Pomeranians belonging to Potter's neighbour Mrs Rogerson, Tabitha Twitchit on Potter's cat at Hill Top, and Dr Maggoty on the magpies in the London Zoological Gardens.

The tale was originally published in a larger size than Potter's previous books, but was reduced in the 1930s to bring it into line with the other books in the Peter Rabbit series. It was given its present title at that time. Potter declared the tale her next favourite to The Tailor of Gloucester. Beswick Pottery released porcelain figurines of the tale's characters through the latter half of the 20th century, and Schmid & Co. released a music box in the 1980s.

== Development and publication ==
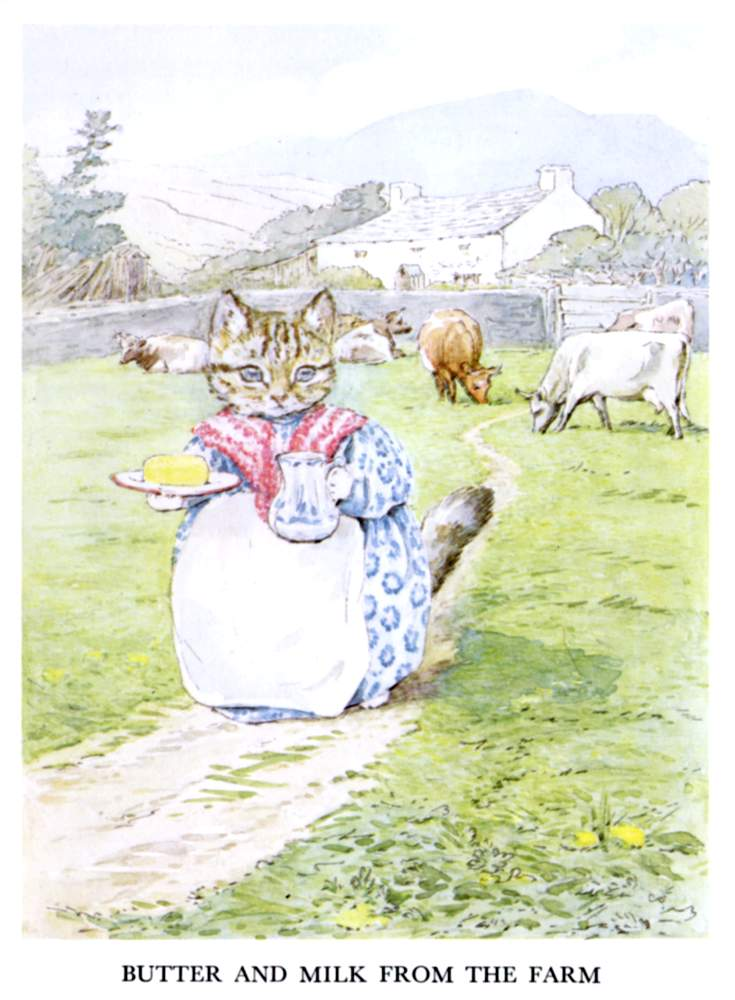
The stolid-looking house at Hill Top, the grazing cows, and the cat "impart a sense of settled respectability" in the frontispiece.

The Potter family summered occasionally at Lakefield, a country house in the village of Sawrey. "They came with their servants, their carriage and pair, and Miss Potter with her pony and phaeton," a village resident recalled. "Miss Potter was about the village sketching everywhere and often came to our house."

Close to Lakefield and off the road in their own enclosure were three dwellings known as Lakefield Cottages. Mr. Rogerson, a gardener and caretaker at Lakefield, lived in one of the cottages, and eventually his wife's two pedigree Pomeranians – Darkie and Duchess – would become the models for Potter's fictional Duchess. Darkie had a fine black mane, but Duchess was more intelligent and could sit up with a lump of sugar balanced on her nose.

In the summer of 1902, Potter sketched the interior of the third Lakefield Cottage belonging to a Mrs. Lord. These drawings included a watercolour and pen-and-ink sketches of the living-room, pen-and-ink sketches of the pots of geraniums on the living-room window sill, the entrance passage, the pantry, the stairs, some of the upstairs rooms, and details of the carved oak furniture. In some of the sketches Potter roughly outlined a cat. She also sketched the village including the sloping path down to the Lakefield Cottages and the post office door. These became the backgrounds for The Pie and The Patty-Pan.

During a rainy holiday in Hastings at the end of November 1903, Potter outlined a tale about a cat, a dog, and a tea party she called Something very very NICE. She discussed the Lakefield sketches as backgrounds for the tale with Warne. He proposed a large format volume similar to L. Leslie Brooke's Johnny Crow's Garden to do justice to the detail of the illustrations, but the entire project was set aside when The Tale of Benjamin Bunny and The Tale of Two Bad Mice were chosen for development and publication in 1904.

Potter had long wanted to develop a book of nursery rhymes, but such a project left Warne cold. Rhymes were already well represented in the firm's catalogue, and Warne felt Potter's unbridled enthusiasm for the genre would make the project a headache for him. In the past, he had tried to discourage Potter's interest in rhymes, believing her own stories superior, but she persisted. He reluctantly agreed to a book of rhymes for 1905, but Potter did not have it ready at the end of 1904, so he accepted the tea party tale instead. Early in 1905, it was decided the book would be published at the end of the year.

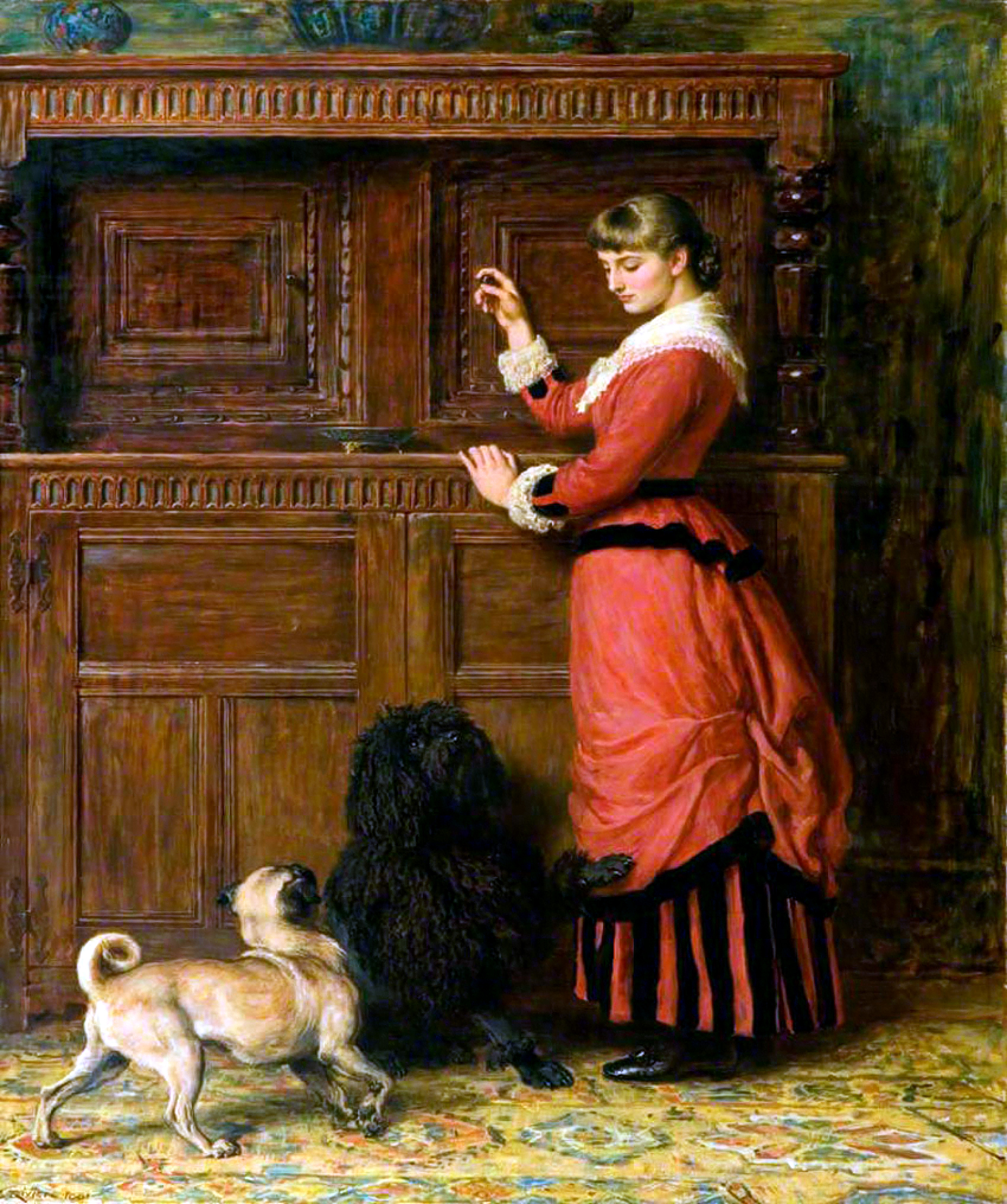
Cupboard Love by Briton Riviere depicts Potter's cousin Kate. The work was parodied by Potter in the illustration of Duchess searching Ribby's cupboard for the mouse pie.

By March 1905, Potter was anxious to begin work on the tale. She thought the 1903 version too thin and rewrote the entire story, retaining Ribby the cat and Duchess the dog as the central characters while elaborating the setting and developing a stronger plot line. It was decided the tale would be published in a format slightly larger than her previous productions with ten full-colour illustrations and other illustrations in pen and sepia ink.

Like the tale's companion piece set in the Newlands Valley, The Tale of Mrs. Tiggy-Winkle, the cat and dog story is set in a real place, Near Sawrey, and is the only Potter tale to refer to Sawrey by name. Tabitha Twitchit disdainfully comments on her cousin's choice of party guest: "A little dog, indeed! Just as if there were no CATS in Sawrey!" The characters in the tale were modelled on real world individuals. Ribby's counterpart lived in Sawrey, and Tabitha Twitchit's counterpart lived at Hill Top, though her fictional shop is located in nearby Hawkshead. Dr. Maggotty was drawn from magpies in the London Zoological Gardens. Potter made notes in her sketchbook about the bird's anatomical structure and the colour of its feathers: "Brown black eye, nose a little hookier than jackdaw, less feathered." The bird's tail was over half its total length she noted, and its feathers were "very blue" and parts were green.

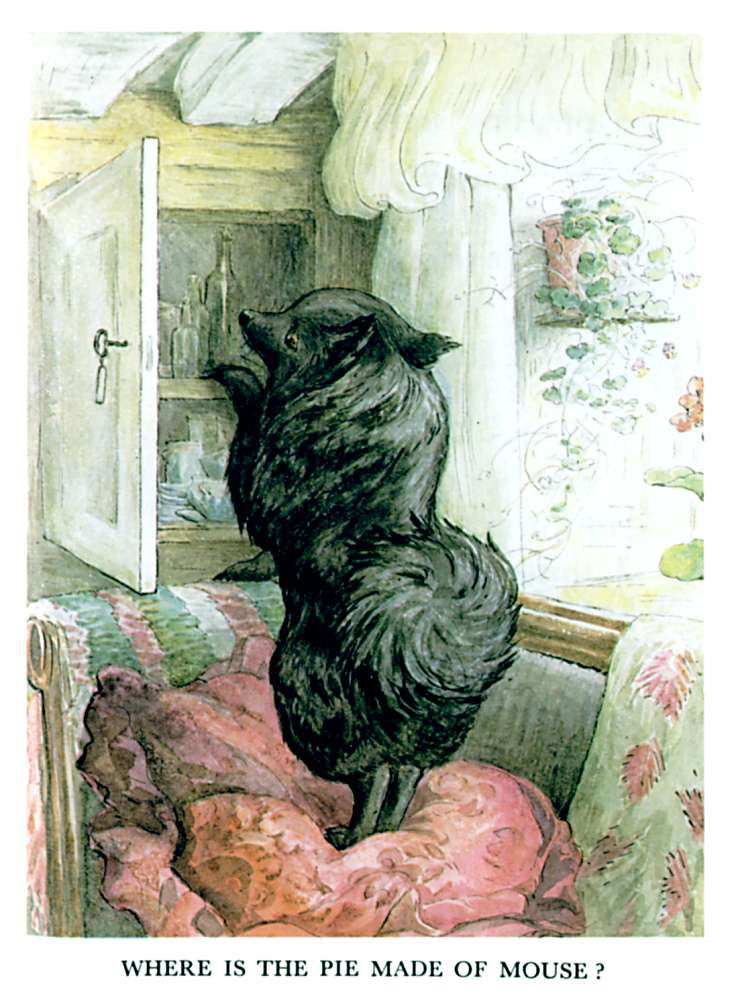
Duchess searches for the mouse pie

The illustrations depict the village's gardens, cottages, and, in the background of the frontispiece, Hill Top. Although the real Duchess lived at Lakefield Cottages, in the tale her home became Buckle Yeat, a picturesque cottage in the village, and Duchess is shown in its garden reading Ribby's invitation. In the illustration of Duchess leaving home with her veal and ham pie in a basket, Potter took some artistic licence and combined the doorway of the village post office with the Buckle Yeat garden. Completely faithful to life in the village, Potter even included the pattens Mrs. Rogerson wore to the pump in the illustration depicting Duchess standing in the Lakefield Cottage porch holding a bouquet. The illustration of Duchess standing on a red sofa cushion was painted at Melford Hall and Potter's young cousin Stephanie Hyde Parker was permitted to put some red paint on the cushion. She later wondered if Potter removed it.

Towards the end of May 1905, Potter sent the illustrations to Warne for his review, writing, "I think it promises to make a pretty book." He criticised a picture of the cat and Potter wrote him, "If you still feel doubtful about the little cat—will you post it back to me at once ... I don't feel perfectly satisfied with the eyes of the large head, but I think I can get it right, by taking out the lights carefully, if you will ask Hentschel not to do it before we have proofs. The drawing is getting much too rubbed."

On 25 May, Warne asked Potter to send him one of the two dummy books she had in her possession in order to check the size of the plates before continuing with the printer's blocks. He thought there was "too much bend" about the dog's nose and the division between its legs was unclear. He kept the two plates back for Potter's inspection before sending them off to make the blocks. On 26 May, he received two more originals and the circular portrait of the cat for the cover. He thought the background of the colour illustration of Ribby and Duchess sitting at the table too light, but liked the pen-and-ink sketches. Potter struggled with the dog illustrations, and sent Warne a photograph of her canine model to prove the dog's ruff was as large as she had depicted it.

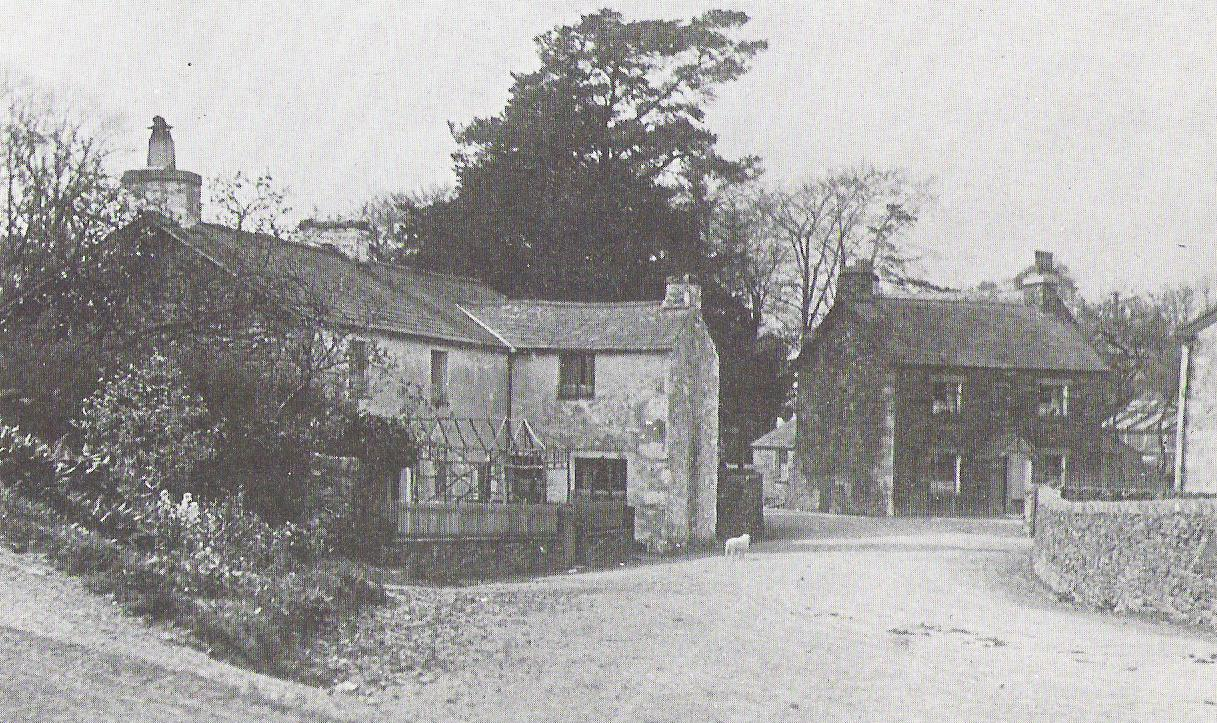
Main street of Sawrey photographed by Potter's father in May 1913

Potter's own three-door oven, her hearthrug, her indoor plants, her coronation teapot, and her water pump are minutely detailed with more color than in other productions. The large format of the original edition, the captions accompanying the full-page color illustrations, and the occasional lack of coordination between picture and text all display Potter's delight in the pictures, sometimes at the expense of the text.

One of the illustrations did not coordinate properly with Potter's text. She altered the drawing and wrote Warne, "I have altered the oven as it will save a good many corrections. I did a good deal to the cat but she is still looking at the top one. I don't think it signifies as she talks about both ovens ... I don't think I have ever seriously considered the state of the pie but the book runs some risk of being over cooked if it goes on much longer! I am sorry about the little dog's nose. I saw it was too sharp. I think I have got it right. I was intending to explain the ovens by saying the middle handle is very stiff so that Duchess concludes it is a sham;–like the lowest. I think only two pages want changing; I think it will come right."

The drawings were finished and in early June 1905 Warne approved. Potter wrote she was glad he liked the drawings, and "if the book prints well, it will be my next favourite to Tailor. She was energized with the completion of the book and wrote Warne she wanted to settle on future work before leaving for a holiday in Wales. In Merioneth she received his letter of proposal on 25 July and accepted, but he died suddenly and unexpectedly on 25 August 1905 before a marriage took place. Potter became deeply depressed and was ill for many weeks. However, she rallied to complete the last two tales she had discussed with him: The Pie and the Patty-Pan and The Tale of Mr. Jeremy Fisher.

The Pie and the Patty-Pan was published in October 1905 in a large format, priced at one shilling, and dedicated to Joan, the sixth child of Potter's former governess Annie Carter Moore, and to Beatrix, Mrs. Moore's newborn and Potter's god-daughter: "For Joan, to read to Baby". The Pie was the first of Potter's books to be published in a format larger (177 mm by 138 mm) than the standard size (139 mm by 104 mm) of the Peter Rabbit books; and the first of her books to integrate pen-and-ink and colour illustrations between its boards.

The book's endpapers had been overlooked. Potter wrote to the firm: "I conclude there is no time to get an end-paper design done—unless Mr. Stokoe has already designed one—I do not mind one way or another; I had begun to scribble something but it looks a bit stiff." Mr. Stokoe apparently did not design one because the endpapers were either plain white or mottled lavender. Several years later, they were replaced with a design featuring a pie and a patty-pan and the cover illustration changed to Ribby sitting by the fire. In the 1930s, the book's size was reduced to bring it into line with the rest of the Peter Rabbit books. The title was changed at that time to The Tale of the Pie and the Patty-Pan.

Potter declared the tale her next favourite to The Tailor of Gloucester. The pictures are some of the most beautiful Potter ever created, especially the profusions of flowers in the doorways and garden plots. The colours in the illustrations are not the muted browns and greens the reader expects in a Potter illustration, nor are they the contrasting colours such as the muted reds and blues Potter uses occasionally to give her illustrations a splash of colour. Instead, the colours are bright oranges, violets, and yellows seldom seen in her other books. Even Ribby's lilac dress and Duchess's black mane illustrate Potter's concern for colour in this book.

== Plot ==
A dog named Duchess is invited to tea by her friend, a pussy cat called Ribby, who says she plans to serve a very special pie. Duchess suspects it'll be mouse flavor, but can't bring herself to tell Ribby she hates the taste of mouse. Instead, she decides she'll secretly switch it with one of her own pies made from ham and veal.

While Ribby is visiting the shops, Duchess sneaks into her house and places her pie in the top compartment of the oven—unaware Ribby's is already baking in the bottom compartment.

At tea, Ribby serves the mouse pie to Duchess, who thinks it's the ham and veal pie. After four servings, she notices the patty-pan she put in it is missing and begins to howl in panic, believing she has swallowed it. Unable to calm her down, Ribby is forced to fetch Dr. Maggoty, a magpie doctor.

While waiting for her return, Duchess discovers her pie is still in the oven and realizes what has happened. She hides the pie outside the back door, intending to retrieve it on her way home. Ribby returns with Dr. Maggoty, who treats Duchess before leaving. After bidding Ribby farewell, Duchess sneaks round the back to collect her pie, only to find Dr. Maggoty has eaten it.

Later, Ribby finds the smashed pie dish and the patty-pan in her garden and declares next time she'll invite her cousin Tabitha Twitchit to tea instead.

== Scholarly commentaries ==
M. Daphne Kutzer, Professor of English at the State University of New York at Plattsburgh at the time of her Beatrix Potter: Writing in Code (2003) believes The Pie and its two immediate predecessors (the tales of Two Bad Mice and Mrs. Tiggy-Winkle) are transitional works in Potter's life and literary career. All three books confront the meaning of domesticity, work, and social hierarchies while exhibiting an underlying discomfort with the unyielding strictures of Victorian domesticity, and a disengagement from the broad political and social concerns of her earlier books to the more narrow political and social concerns of working farmers and rural people.

Ruth K. MacDonald of New Mexico State University at the time of her Beatrix Potter (1986) argues that the theme of The Pie is the very proper social relations between neighbours in a small town. She points to the overly formal quality of the letters exchanged between the heroines as one example of the theme, and another, she indicates, is the manner in which the two pass each other on the street without a word to one another because "they were going to have a party". Though Duchess probably does not speak to Ribby for fear of revealing her plan to switch the two pies, Ribby probably does not speak to Duchess out of an exaggerated sense of politeness or because she is rushed. At the hour of the party, Duchess is anxious to arrive on time, yet not too early, and loiters outside Ribby's cottage before delivering her most "genteel little tap-tappity" and asking "Is Mrs. Ribston at home?" MacDonald notes that these instances not only underscore the elaborate codes of behaviour Potter's fictional animals observe but, by extension, the villagers of Sawrey. For Potter, the result of such elaborate etiquette was nonsensical, distorted behaviour. Nevertheless, the cat and dog remain friends at the end of the story, and, in carefully avoiding any offence, their social pretenses and codes of etiquette are maintained.

== Merchandise ==
Potter asserted her tales would one day be nursery classics, and part of the process in making them so was marketing strategy. She was the first to exploit the commercial possibilities of her characters and tales with spinoffs such as a Peter Rabbit doll, an unpublished Peter Rabbit board game, and a Peter Rabbit nursery wallpaper between 1903 and 1905. Similar "side-shows" (as she termed the spinoffs) were conducted over the following two decades.

In 1947, Frederick Warne & Co. gave Beswick Pottery of Longton, Staffordshire rights and licences to produce the Potter characters in porcelain. Ribby coming from the farm with butter and milk was released as a figurine in 1951; Duchess with a bouquet of flowers in 1955; Duchess holding the ham and veal pie in 1979; and Ribby and the broken pie dish in 1992. A limited edition tableau depicting Duchess and Ribby was produced only in 2000.

Schmid & Co. of Toronto and Randolph, Massachusetts was granted licensing rights to Beatrix Potter in 1977. A music box playing "Music Box Dancer" and topped with a porcelain figure of Duchess holding a bouquet was released in 1980.

== Reprints and translations ==
As of 2010, all of Potter's 23 small format books remain in print, and available as complete sets in presentation boxes, and as a 400-page omnibus. First edition copies and early reprints of The Pie are offered by antiquarian booksellers. The Pie was available as a hardcover volume but also in paperback, audiobook, and electronic formats.

The English language editions of the books still bore the Frederick Warne imprint in 2010 though the company was bought by Penguin Books in 1983. The printing plates for the Potter books were remade from new photographs of the original drawings in 1985, and all 23 volumes released in 1987 as The Original and Authorized Edition.

Potter's books have been translated into nearly thirty languages including Greek and Russian. In 1986, MacDonald observed that the Potter books had become a traditional part of childhood in both English-speaking lands and those in which the books had been translated.
