= The Tale of Mrs. Tiggy-Winkle =

1905 children's book written by Beatrix Potter

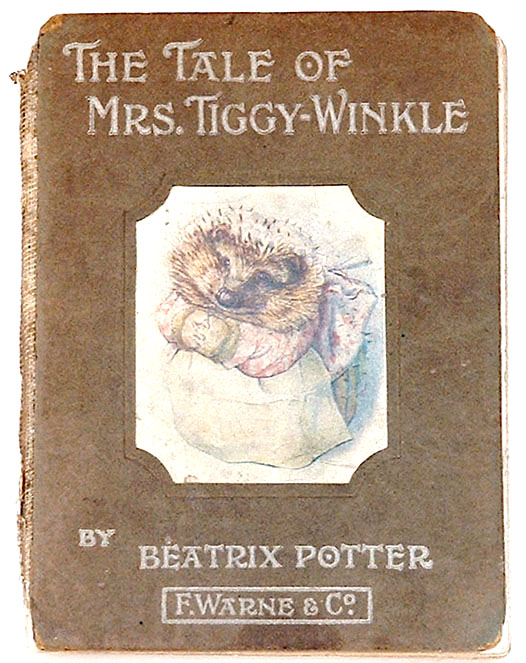
- First edition cover
- Author: Beatrix Potter
- Illustrator: Beatrix Potter
- Language: English
- Genre: Children's literature
- Publisher: Frederick Warne & Co.
- Publication date: October 1905
- Publication place: England
- Media type: Print (hardcover)
- Preceded by: The Tale of Two Bad Mice
- Followed by: The Tale of the Pie and the Patty-Pan
- Text: The Tale of Mrs. Tiggy-Winkle at Wikisource

The Tale of Mrs. Tiggy-Winkle is a children's book written and illustrated by Beatrix Potter. It was published by Frederick Warne & Co. in October 1905. Mrs. Tiggy-winkle is a hedgehog washerwoman (laundress) who lives in a tiny cottage in the fells of the Lake District. A child named Lucie happens upon the cottage and stays for tea. The two deliver freshly laundered clothing to the animals and birds in the neighbourhood. Potter thought the book would be best enjoyed by girls, and, like most girls' books of the period, it is set indoors with a focus on housework.

Potter's pet hedgehog, Mrs. Tiggy-winkle, (Note: Potter spelled the name 'Tiggy-winkle' but the name in the title of the published book became 'Tiggy-Winkle' (Lear 2007, p. 187).) and Kitty MacDonald, a Scottish washerwoman, were the inspirations for the eponymous heroine. Lucie Carr, a child friend of Potter's, was the model for the fictional Lucie. Potter's Peter Rabbit and Benjamin Bunny make cameo appearances in the illustrations. The Newlands Valley and the surrounding fells are the sources for the backgrounds in the illustrations.

Mrs. Tiggy-winkle has been described as one of Potter's most positive creations. Although Mrs. Tiggy-Winkle is set in an identifiable place and time period, the tale is mythologized by reaching back to an age when household chores were performed manually and without the aid of modern mechanical inventions. The simple dwellings, rustic pathways, and stone fences enhance the tale's timeless aspect and suggest an unchanging countryside and its way of life.

Mrs. Tiggy-winkle became a popular character and the subject of considerable merchandise over the decades including nursery ware and porcelain figurines. The tale has been published in braille and the Initial Teaching Alphabet, and has been translated into French, German, and Dutch. In 1971, Mrs. Tiggy-winkle became a character performed by Sir Frederick Ashton in The Royal Ballet film, The Tales of Beatrix Potter. In 1993, the tale was adapted to animation and telecast as an episode of the BBC series, The World of Peter Rabbit and Friends.

== Plot ==
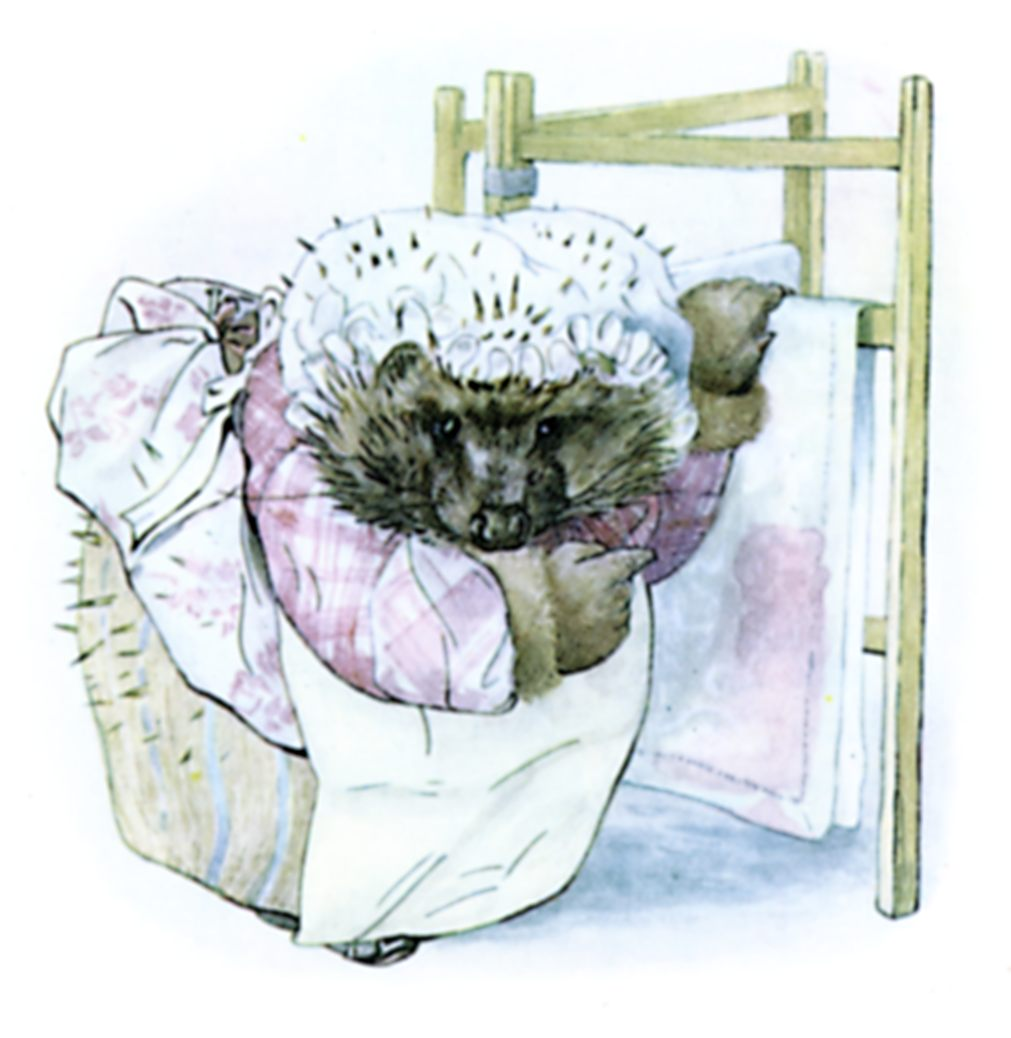
Mrs. Tiggy-Winkle with Jenny Wren's wine-stained table cloth

A little girl named Lucie, living on a farm called Little-Town, has lost three handkerchiefs and a pinafore. She questions Tabby Kitten and Sally Henny-penny about them, but they know nothing. Lucie mounts a stile and spies some white cloths lying in the grass high on a hill behind the farm. She scrambles up the hill along a steep pathway which ends under a big rock. She finds a little door in the hillside and hears someone singing behind it.

Lucie opens the door and discovers a low-ceilinged kitchen and tiny objects. At the table stands a short, stout woman, who introduces herself as Mrs. Tiggy-Winkle, a washerwoman. She has found Lucie's lost things, and launders them for her, as well as showing items belonging to her customers. They have tea together, though Lucie keeps her distance from Mrs. Tiggy-Winkle due to the prickles on her back.

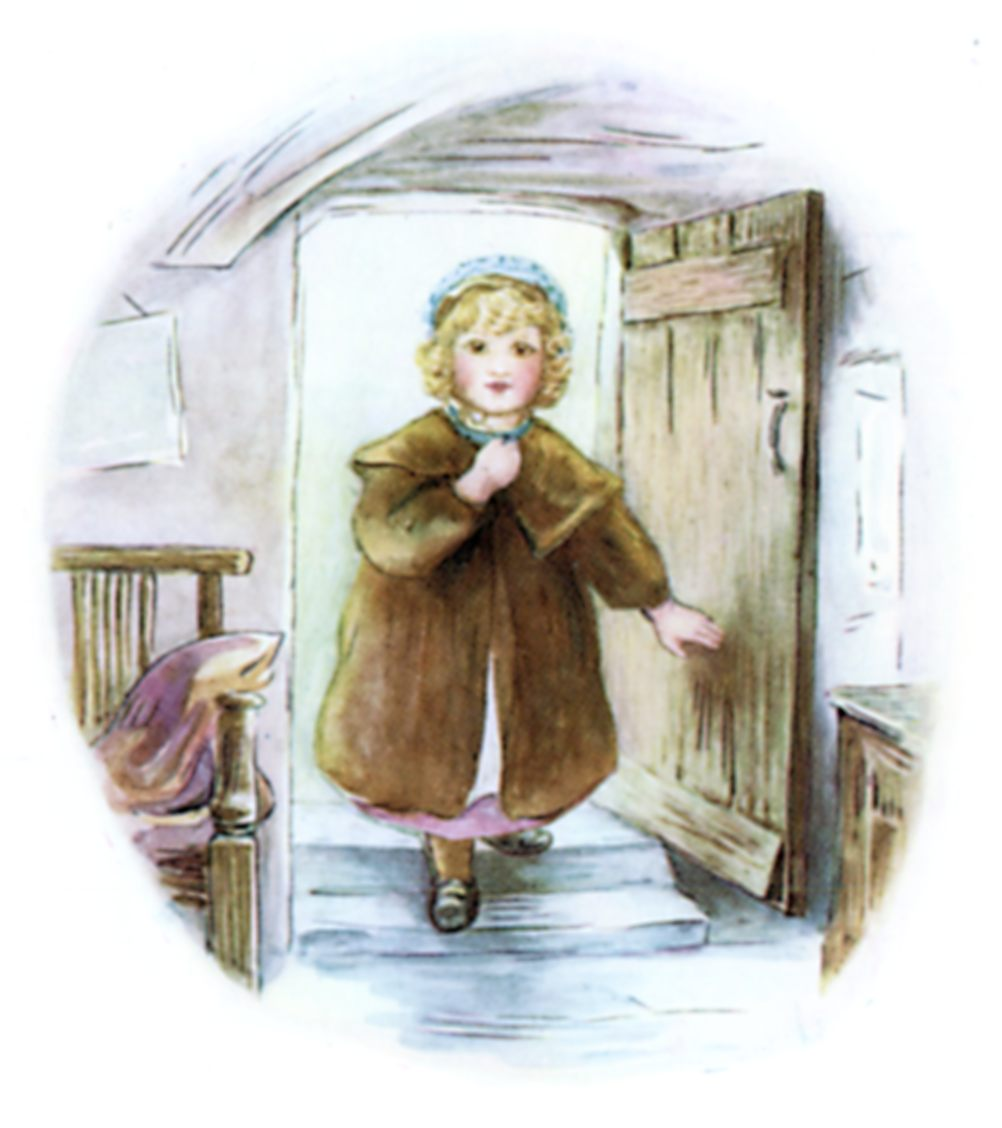
Lucie enters Mrs Tiggy-Winkle's cottage; Potter had trouble depicting humans

The laundered clothing is tied up in bundles and Lucie's handkerchiefs are neatly folded into her clean pinafore. They set off together down the path to return the fresh laundry to the little animals and birds in the neighbourhood. At the bottom of the hill, Lucie mounts the stile and turns to thank Mrs. Tiggy-Winkle. However, strangely, Mrs. Tiggy-Winkle runs up the hill, not asking for the washing bill nor saying goodbye. Her clothes have disappeared, revealing Mrs. Tiggy-Winkle to be a hedgehog.

Following the events, some townspeople believe Lucie had fallen asleep on the stile and dreamed the encounter, despite having her laundry cleaned and the narrator themselves stating they have seen Mrs. Tiggy-Winkle's door.

== Background ==
The story of Mrs. Tiggy-Winkle was inspired by Kitty MacDonald, a Scottish washerwoman the Potters employed over the course of eleven summers at Dalguise House on the River Tay in Perthshire. Potter was 26 when, in 1892, she visited MacDonald while staying at Heath Park, Birnam. She wrote in her journal: "Went out with the pony ... to see Kitty MacDonald, our old washerwoman ... Kitty is eighty-three but waken, and delightfully merry ... She is a comical, round little woman, as brown as a berry and wears a multitude of petticoats and a white mutch. Her memory goes back for seventy years, and I really believe she is prepared to enumerate the articles of her first wash in the year '71". (The Scots Language Centre defines "mutch" as "A head-dress, especially a close-fitting day cap of white linen or muslin…specifically such as used to be worn by married women”.)

In 1942, the year before she died, Potter's thoughts returned to Kitty MacDonald when she wrote about a piece of crockery:

Seventy eighty years ago it belonged to another old woman, old Katie MacDonald, the Highland washerwoman. She was a tiny body, brown as a berry, beady black eyes and much wrinkled, against an incongruously white frilled mutch. She wore a small plaid crossed over shawl pinned with a silver brooch, a bed jacket, and a full kilted petticoat. She dropped bob curtsies, but she was outspoken and very independent, proud and proper ... The joy of converse with old Katie was to draw her out to talk of the days when she was a wee bit lassie—herding the kine. The days when 'Boney' [Napoleon] was a terror ... the old woman wouldn't dwell upon hard weather and storms; she spoke of the sunshine and clouds, and shadows, the heather bells, ... "the broom of the Cowden Knowes", the sun and wind on the hills where she played, and knitted, and herded cattle and sheep. A bonny life it was, but it never came back ..."

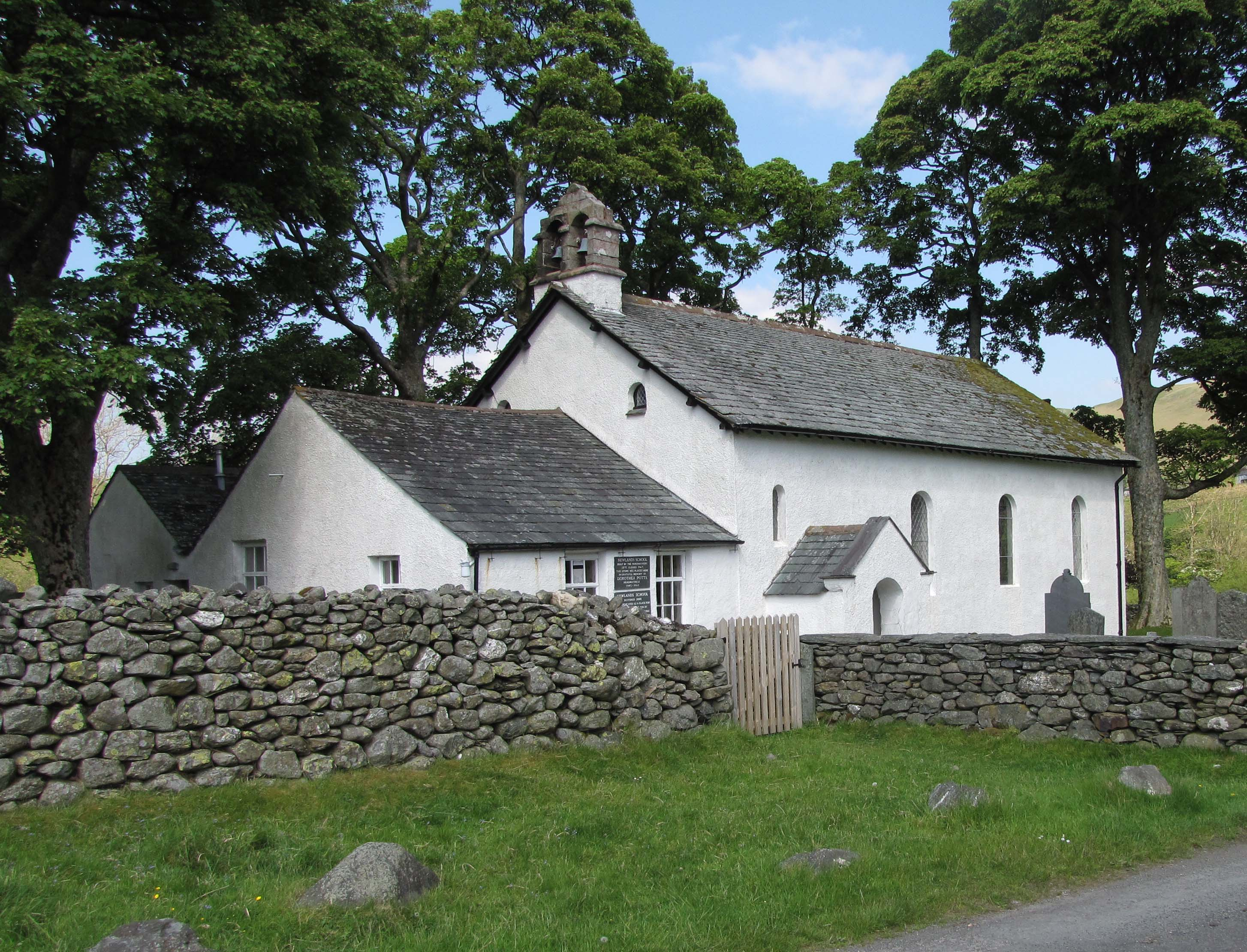
Lucie Carr's father was the Vicar of Newlands Church

Mrs. Tiggy-Winkle may have been conceived as early as 1886, it was not until 1901 Potter began elaborating it while on holiday at Lingholm west of Derwentwater where she met young Kathleen and Lucie Carr, daughters of the local vicar. In 1902, it was put to paper. The Carr family lived at Skelghyl, but Potter took some artistic liberty and moved the house's location to Little Town in the text. The family came to tea at Lingholm often with Potter delighted by the one-year-old child's behaviour. On one occasion, Lucie left her gloves behind at Lingholm, and Potter transformed the incident into the fictional Lucie's propensity for losing her pocket handkerchiefs. A small copy book contains what is believed to be the earliest manuscript of Mrs. Tiggy-Winkle. Its title page is inscribed: "Made at Lingholm, Sept. 01 told to cousin Stephanie at Melford Nov. 01—written down Nov. 02. There are no pictures, it is a good one to tell—"

Potter used her cousin's daughter, Stephanie Hyde Parker, as audience for the draft of the story. She likely meant to dedicate the book to Stephanie, writing in the manuscript, "Now Stephanie, this is a story about a little girl called Lucie; she was smaller than you and could not speak quite plain." In the end however, the book was dedicated to Lucie Carr. Stephanie would receive the dedication to The Tale of Mr. Jeremy Fisher in 1906.

Early in 1904, Potter was putting the finishing touches on Benjamin Bunny and Two Bad Mice. At the same time, she began giving serious thought to developing the tale about Mrs. Tiggy-winkle and Lucie. She had been working on backgrounds and had been carrying her pet hedgehog with her when travelling. On 15 March she wrote to her editor Norman Warne, "I have been drawing the stump of a hollow tree for another hedgehog drawing".

Potter and Warne agreed a volume of nursery rhymes would be created in 1905 but she also brought his attention to a story she had previously written, writing to him, "I think 'Mrs. Tiggy' would be all right; it is a girl's book ... there must be a large audience of little girls. I think they would like the different clothes." She began the illustrations in the summer once he agreed to the concept.

== Illustrations and production ==
Potter biographer Linda Lear writes that Mrs. Tiggy-Winkle, unlike Potter's earlier work, was "a story set in a real place, about a real washerwoman, a real hedge-hog named Tiggy-winkle, and a child Lucie, from Little-town in the Newlands valley". In the summer of 1904, Potter again took her holiday at Lingholm, and drew pen and ink illustrations for the hedgehog book based on in watercolours made of the area the previous year. After returning to London in October, family matters prevented her from continuing work on the tale; she returned to Mrs. Tiggy-Winkle in late November 1904. The sketchbook scenes of the path above Little Town, the Newlands Valley, the fells, and Skiddaw were reproduced in the published book almost exactly as found in the sketchbook, except for the inclusion of the figures and some minor artistic liberties. Potter included in her illustrations a depiction a small door used to close abandoned mine shafts in the fells. During her explorations of the area she visited farms at Skelghyl and sheep farms in the fells.

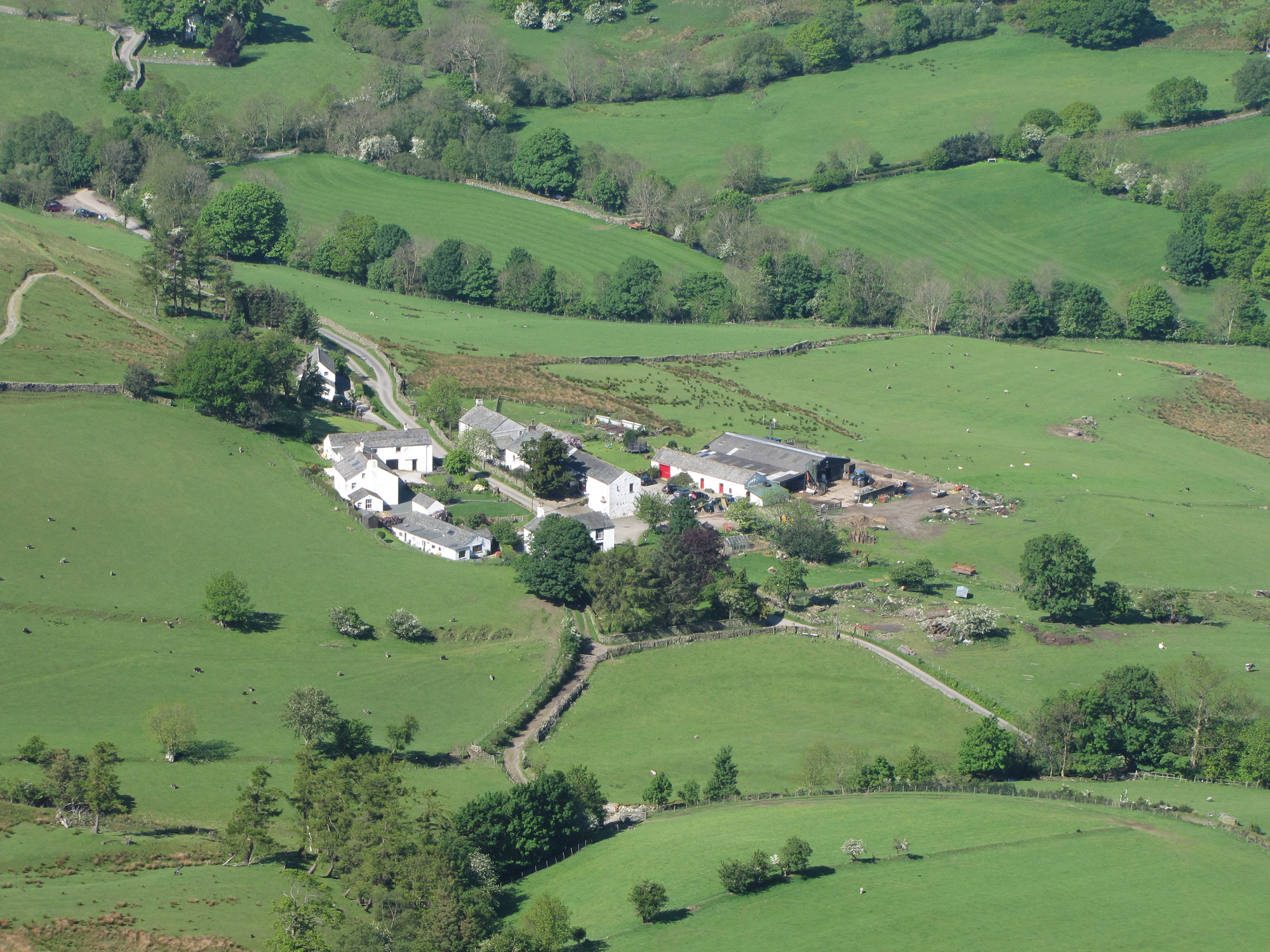
Little Town is a hamlet that consists of the Newlands Church and a few farm buildings. The church can be seen in a grove of trees at the top left.

The model for the preliminary illustrations of Mrs. Tiggy-winkle was Potter's own pet hedgehog. Potter wrote to Warne on 12 November, "Mrs. Tiggy as a model is comical; so long as she can go to sleep on my knee she is delighted, but if she is propped up on end for half an hour, she first begins to yawn pathetically, and then she does bite! Nevertheless, she is a dear person; just like a very fat rather stupid little dog. I think the book will go all right when once started." Three weeks later, she wrote, "The hedgehog drawings are turning out very comical. I have dressed up a cottonwool dummy for convenience of drawing the clothes. It is such a figure of fun." The dummy terrified her rabbit and her pet mouse pulled out the stuffing. "I think it should make a good book," she wrote, "When I have learnt to draw the child."

Although Potter had little difficulty with the landscapes, the kitchen, and the birds and animals, Lucie presented a serious problem. Potter recognized and admitted the human form eluded her and confessed she faced a worrisome challenge whenever it was absolutely necessary to bring a human into an illustration. She made a number of preliminary sketches of Lucie, changed the colour of her cloak, and enlisted a real child as a model.

Mrs. Tiggy-winkle's kitchen is typical of those seen by Potter in Lakeland and Sawrey, and presented no artistic difficulties. She had been sketching interiors for years.

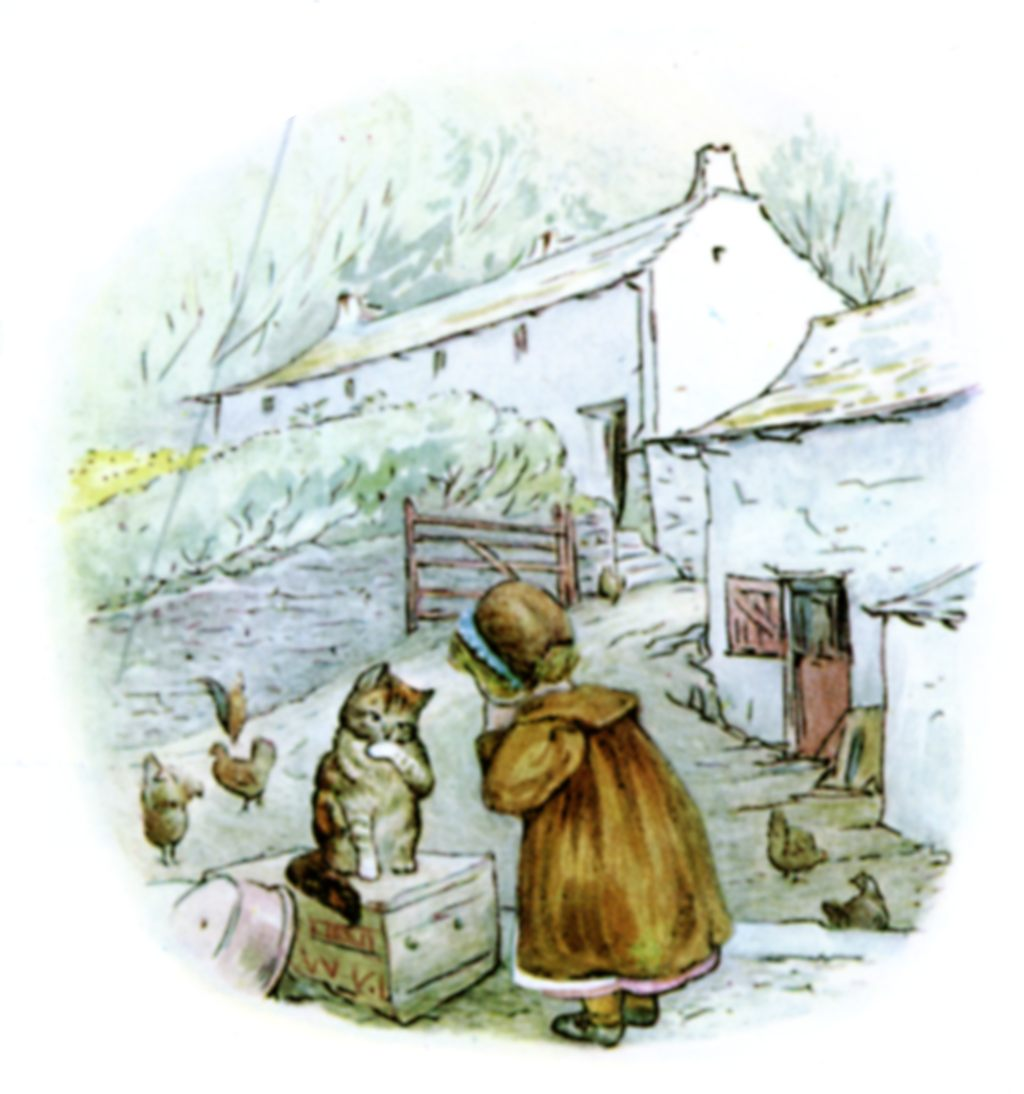
For artistic reasons, Potter moved Lucie Carr's house at Skelghyl to Little Town.

By February 1905, the drawings for the book sent to be converted to blocks, and, in late March, she began The Pie and the Patty-Pan, the companion piece to Mrs. Tiggy-Winkle. Potter continued to fuss with the tale's text and illustrations. The proofs of the text arrived in the beginning of June, and Potter laboured over them. She reconsidered the rhyme writing to Warne,

I do not think that rhyme is right grammar; it is the "no" that throws it out. If it were
"Smooth and hot—red rusty spot
never here be seen—oh!"
that would be all right. She is supposed to be exorcising spots and iron stains, same as Lady Macbeth(!). The verb is imperative, and apparently it is not reasonable to use "no" with a vocative noun. It is a contradiction to address "no spot!" I am afraid this is rather muddled; I used to know my Latin grammar but it has faded ... I wish another book could be planned out before the summer, if we are going on with them, I always feel very much lost when they are finished.

She had enjoyed developing the book with Warne, and, on 2 July, sent him the remainder of the book, expressing her regret that its production was over. On 25 July proofs sent to her from the publisher showed spottiness that may have been caused by the summer heat affecting the chemicals used in the engraving process; the plates were re-engraved in September.

== Publication history and adaptations ==
Twenty thousand copies of the book were released in a 139 by 104 millimetres (5.5 in × 4.1 in) format in October 1905 with The Pie and the Patty-Pan. Another 10,000 copies were released in November 1905, and another 8,000 in January 1906. The dedication reads, "For the real little Lucie of Newlands"; Lucie's copy of the book was inscribed, "For little Lucie with much love from Beatrix Potter and from dear 'Mrs. Tiggy-Winkle' Sept. 24. 05."

Soon after the book's publication, Potter's ageing Mrs. Tiggy began showing signs of failing health. She wrote a friend on 1 February 1906, "I am sorry to say I am upset about poor Mrs. Tiggy. She hasn't seemed well the last fortnight, and has begun to be sick, and she is so thin. I am going to try some physic but I am a little afraid that the long course of unnatural diet and indoor life is beginning to tell on her. It is a wonder she has lasted so long. One gets very fond of a little animal. I hope she will either get well or go quickly." A few weeks later Potter chloroformed her beloved hedgehog and laid her to rest in the garden at the Potter family home at 2 Bolton Gardens, Kensington.

The tale has had two dramatic adaptations. In 1971, Sir Frederick Ashton performed the role of Mrs. Tiggy-Winkle in The Royal Ballet film The Tales of Beatrix Potter, which he also choreographed. In 1993, the tale was adapted (with The Tale of Mr. Jeremy Fisher) as one of six episodes of the animated BBC anthology series The World of Peter Rabbit and Friends.

In the 2018 film Peter Rabbit, Mrs. Tiggy-Winkle is voiced by Australian singer-songwriter Sia doing a Scottish accent.

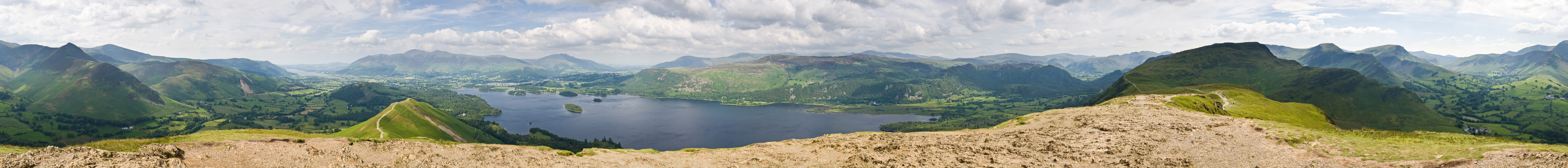
A 360-degree view from the summit of Catbells. Catbells is Mrs. Tiggy-winkle's address in the tale. The view north of the summit (middle of the image) takes in Keswick on the edge of Derwentwater. Potter was summering at Lingholm near Keswick during the development of Mrs. Tiggy-Winkle.

== Miniature letters ==
Potter created a series of miniature letters for child fans between 1907 and 1912. These letters were written as from her characters and intended to shed light on their doings outside their tales and to tell the recipient more about them. Each letter was folded to represent an envelope, and addressed to the child recipient. There was a tiny stamp in the corner drawn with a red crayon. They were sent to the children in a miniature post bag marked G.P.O. that Potter had made herself or in a toy tin mail box enamelled bright red. "Some of the letters were very funny," Potter wrote, "The defect was that inquiries and answers were all mixed up."

Potter sent miniature letters to the Moore children, to the Warne children, Lucie Carr and her older sister Kathleen, Master Drew Fayle, and to Master John and Miss Margaret Hough. Seven letters about Mrs. Tiggy-Winkle are extant. Mrs. Josephine Rabbit writes to complain of starch in her handkerchiefs, Mrs. Tiggy-Winkle responds with apologies, Mrs. Rabbit then writes to compliment Mrs. Tiggy-Winkle on the "getting up of the children's muslin frocks" and promises not to seek another laundress. Mrs. Tiggy-Winkle writes Master Fayle warning him that "[e]verything has got all mixed up in wrong bundles" and wondering if he has received Mr. Jeremy Fisher's shirt or Mrs. Flopsy Bunny's apron? Mrs. Bunny writes Master Drew that she is looking for her apron. She has received a shirt marked J.F. that is 3-inches long. Jeremy writes twice to Mrs. Tiggy-Winkle. Once, to complain that he has received an apron marked F.B. and then to complain in a letter dated 22 January 1910:

Mr. J. Fisher regrets to have to complain again about the washing. Mrs. T. Winkle has sent home an enormous handkerchief marked 'D. Fayle' instead of the tablecloth marked J.F. If this continues every week, Mr. J. Fisher will have to get married, so as to have the washing done at home.

== Scholarly commentaries ==
Ruth K. MacDonald, Professor of English at New Mexico State University, past president of the Children's Literature Association, and author of Beatrix Potter (1986), views the plot of Mrs. Tiggy-Winkle as "thin" and lacking the complications of Potter's previously published The Tale of Two Bad Mice (1905) and later books. The tale is held together, she asserts, by its attractive central character, and points out that, like many girls' books of the period, it is set indoors and revolves around household chores and duties. Unlike Two Bad Mice however, there is no ironic commentary on housekeeping; Potter gives her tacit approval to Mrs. Tiggy-winkle's spic and span cottage and her housekeeping practices. MacDonald points out that Mrs. Tiggy-Winkle is the first of Potter's books to depict a countryside of simple dwellings, pathways, stone fences, and the timeless, unchanging ways of rural life. Actual place names in the tale such as Skelghyl, Garthsgate, and Little-town ground the tale in a real world locality yet the tale is mythologized by suggesting a remote time before mechanical means of doing laundry had been invented. She notes that Mrs. Tiggy-winkle has become "synonymous for female hedgehogs and for fastidious housekeepers".

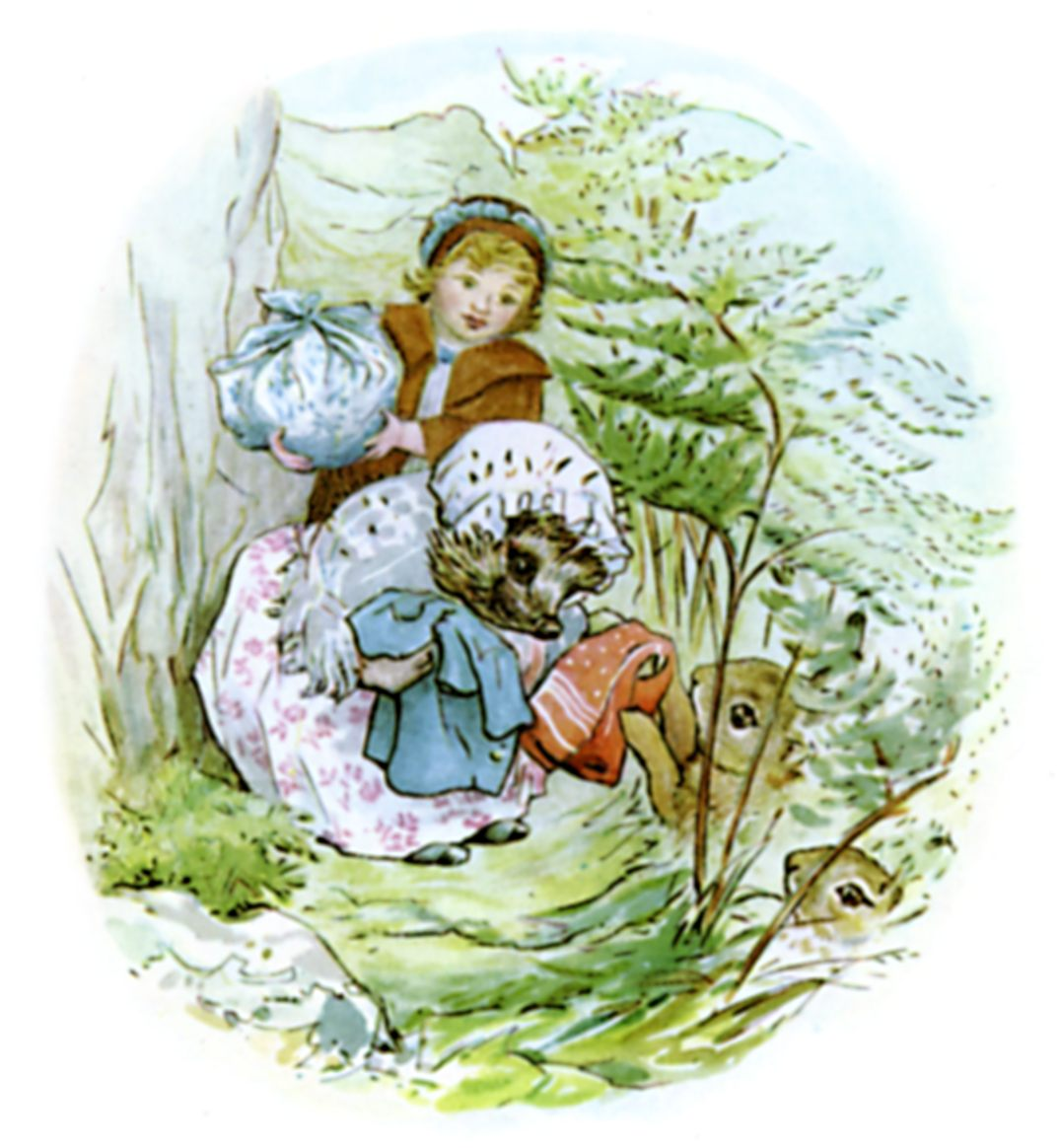
Mrs. Tiggy-winkle and Lucie give Peter Rabbit and Benjamin Bunny their clean wash.

M. Daphne Kutzer, Professor of English at the State University of New York at Plattsburgh and author of Beatrix Potter: Writing in Code (2003) indicates Potter was venturing into new territory in creating a tale with a large human presence (Lucie). Potter's artistic uncertainty is evident in her attempt to establish a relationship between clothes and the social and animal selves of humans and animals. Mrs. Tiggy-winkle wears human clothing while the neighbourhood animals wear and shed only their skins. Logically, Kutzer points out, all the animals should wear either human clothing or only their skins. She believes Peter Rabbit's blue jacket is used in the tale as a gimmick to remind the reader that other Potter books exist for purchase, and a gimmick that disrupts Potter's artistic intent. If Peter wears human clothing then why do the other animals wear only their skins? The issue of animal clothing versus human clothing is further confused when Mrs. Tiggy-winkle sheds her human clothing at the end of the tale to reveal herself a hedgehog who may or may not be able to shed her skin as well. If she can shed her skin, then why is she wearing human clothes? Kutzer believes these questions remain unanswered and erode the tale's logic.

Kutzer has observed, that the act of shedding one's clothes symbolizes the rejection of social constraints and the adoption of animalistic freedom. In the case of Lucie, however, this transformation does not occur. Although she acquires knowledge about the animal world, she begins the story as a well-behaved Victorian child and ends it in the same manner, taking pleasure in the clothing that defines her social role. Kutzer argues that because Lucie learns nothing about herself, her status as a literary heroine is ambiguous.

By inserting her authorial voice in the tale's epilogue, Potter reveals her uncertainty about the believability of her fantasy, and her uncertainty mars the narrative line which, Kutzer remarks, is analogous to a "comedy sketch that should have stayed at joke length, but is unwisely stretched into ten minutes of tepid comedy." The notion of having animals shed their skins for laundering provides opportunities for amusing illustrations, but the tale does not have a strong narrative line to hold it together or to grip the reader's attention. The tale is held together solely by the quaint language and work of the charming central character.

Literary scholar Humphrey Carpenter writes in Secret Gardens The Golden Age of Children's Literature that Potter's work shows thematic shifts, seeing in The Tale of Mrs. Tiggy-Winkle a utopian theme of nature-as-redemption in which the background represents a return to Arcadia of sorts. Young Lucy finds in Mrs. Tiggy-winkle's kitchen a place of refuge, and although unlike Potter's previous stories the main character is unthreatened by other characters or external circumstances, Carpenter writes "while no external threat enters this most utopian of Potter's books, there is none the less something faintly sinister about Mrs. Tiggy-winkle herself".

== Merchandise ==
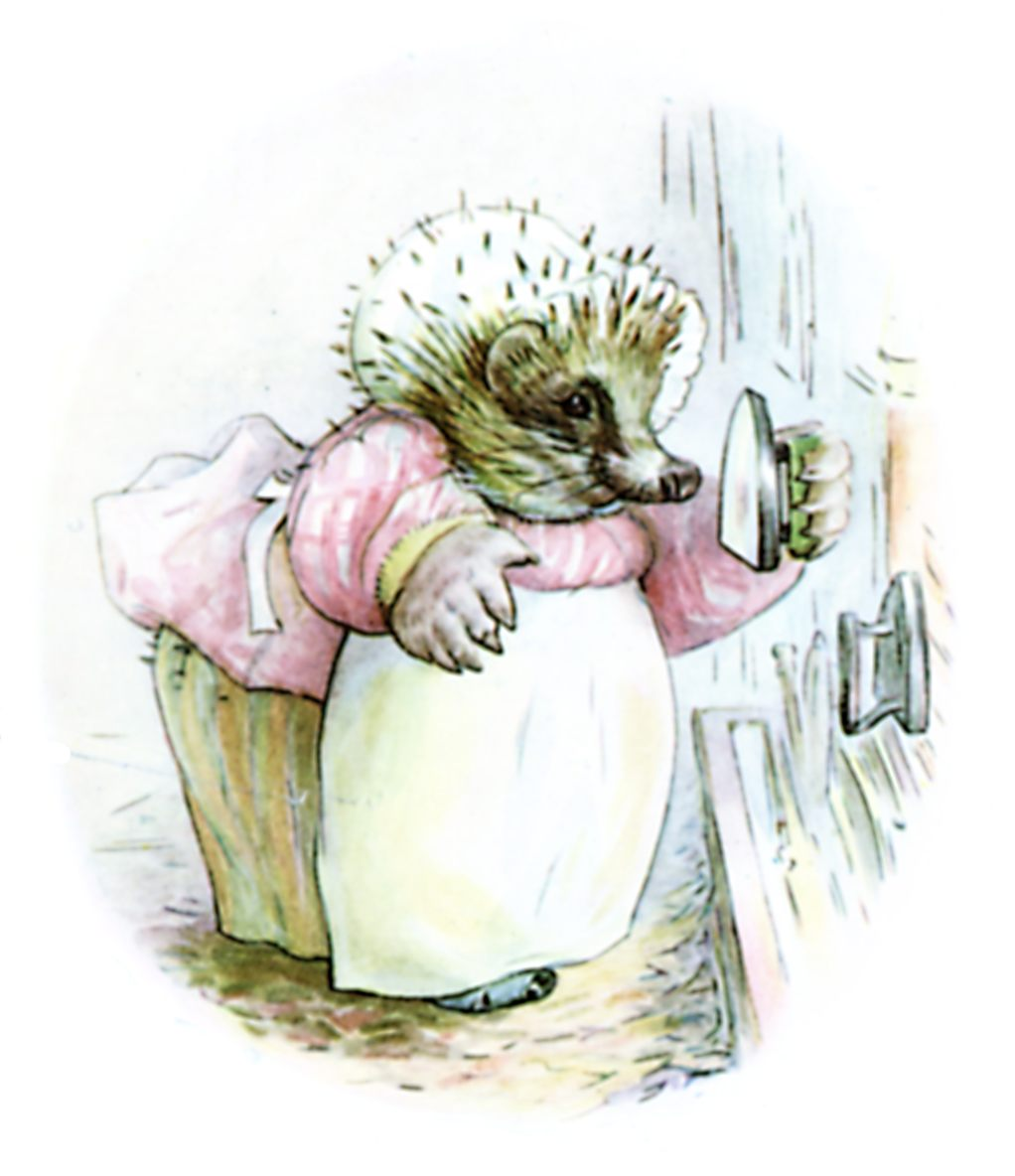
Beswick Pottery released a porcelain figurine modelled on the frontispiece of Mrs. Tiggy-winkle holding an iron.

Potter asserted her tales would one day be nursery classics, and part of the "longevity of her books comes from strategy", writes her biographer Ruth MacDonald. Potter was the first to exploit the commercial possibilities of her characters and tales; between 1903 and 1905 these included a Peter Rabbit stuffed toy, an unpublished board game, and nursery wallpaper. Similar "side-shows" (as she termed the ancillary merchandise) were produced throughout her life. Upon publication of the book, Norman Warne suggested a Mrs. Tiggy-Winkle pin cushion doll as a merchandising gimmick.

Potter died on 22 December 1943 and left her home and the original illustrations for almost all of her books, including Mrs. Tiggy-Winkle, to the National Trust. Hilltop was opened to visitors in 1946, and displayed her original artwork there until 1985. In 1947, Frederick Warne & Co. granted Beswick Pottery of Longton, Staffordshire "rights and licences to produce" the Potter characters in porcelain. The next year, Mrs. Tiggy-Winkle was one of the first set of ten porcelain figurines released. Between 1985 and 1999 Beswick produced five more porcelain collectibles featuring the hedgehog, including her head as a mug in 1988, a larger version of the first figurine in 1996, and a limited edition tableau showing Lucie and Mrs. Tiggy-Winkle in 1999. Beswick Pottery was eventually acquired by Royal Doulton, which continued to issue the figurines under the "Royal Albert" brand until it was discontinued in 2002.

Stuffed toy manufacturers requested licensing for Potter's figures as early as 1909; however she refused to grant permission, having been disappointed with the quality of the proposed toys. In the early 1970s Frederick Warne & Co. granted a licence for plush toys to an English firm, House of Nesbit Ltd., which produced seven characters, including Mrs. Tiggy-Winkle. Their finely detailed products were labour-intensive and unprofitable, and were discontinued after a short time. In 1973, Eden Toys of Jersey City, New Jersey received a licence to manufacture stuffed animals based on Potter's characters. Eden produced a plush Mrs. Tiggy-Winkle in 1974, and made at least three other versions of the hedgehog over the years, including an 18-inch (46 cm) "Giant" model, originally intended for display in stores. All of these were discontinued by 2001, when Eden Toys went out of business.

Potter's illustrations of Mrs. Tiggy-Winkle were featured on biscuit tins made by Huntley & Palmer between 1974 and 1978, and on a series of enamel items made by Crummles of Poole, Dorset from 1974 to 1995. These included five different images on four different-sized enamel boxes, as well as an enamel thimble, needle case, and pin cushion. From 1977 to 1995 (when it went out of business), Schmid & Co. of Toronto and Randolph, Massachusetts made or distributed a series of items featuring the hedgehog washerwoman. These included one of the first ten Potter music boxes the company released in 1977. Schmid distributed two Mrs. Tiggy-Winkle Christmas ornaments (3 and 1.5 inches (76 and 38 mm) tall) and another music box, all made by the Italian firm ANRI, as well as a figurine made by Border Fine Arts, a Scottish firm, showing Mrs. Tiggy-Winkle and other Potter characters around a Christmas tree.

In 1979, Wedgwood produced a 16-piece Queen's Ware nursery set; each piece was decorated with artwork and accompanying text from The Tale of Mrs. Tiggy-Winkle. Wedgwood retired the items, which were similar in style to its Peter Rabbit nursery ware, in 1995. In 1982, Mrs. Tiggy-Winkle was featured on Wedgwood's Happy Birthday plate, "the only year that a character other than Peter Rabbit was used on the annual plate".

== Reprints and translations ==
In 1913, Warnes considered publishing some of Potter's little books in French and thought it best to remove any wording in English from the pictures. Potter redrew the illustration of the spring bubbling out of the hillside to omit the words "How Keld" (Norse for Hill Well). Potter noted in a letter that the words occasionally brought inquiries about their meaning.

As of 2010, all 23 of Potter's small format books remain in print, and are available as complete sets in presentation boxes. A 400-page omnibus edition is also available. Mrs. Tiggy-Winkle is available in Kindle format. First editions and early reprints are occasionally offered by antiquarian booksellers.

The English language editions of the tales still bore the Frederick Warne imprint in 2010 though the company was bought by Penguin Books in 1983. Penguin remade the printing plates from new photographs of the original drawings in 1985, and all 23 volumes were released in 1987 as The Original and Authorized Edition.

Potter's small format books have been translated into nearly thirty languages, including Greek and Russian. Mrs. Tiggy-Winkle was released in braille in 1921, and in the Initial Teaching Alphabet in 1965. The tale was translated into French in 1922 as Poupette-à-L'Epingle, and in Dutch as Het Verhall van Vrouwtje Plooi in 1969. In 1932, it was translated into Welsh as Hanes Meistres Tigi-Dwt, and into German in 1948 as Die Geschichte von Frau Tiggy-Winkle. In 1986, MacDonald observed that the Potter books had become a "traditional part of childhood in most only English-speaking countries and in many of the countries into whose languages Potter's books have been translated".

The Tale of Mrs. Tiggy-Winkle was the only book by Potter published in the Soviet Union. The name of the main character was translated into Russian as Ухти-Тухти (Ookhti-Tookhti), an imitation of hedgehog puffing. The book became quite popular and was adapted into a filmstrip and an animated cartoon.

== Cultural impact ==
The British wildlife hospital Tiggywinkles is named after Mrs. Tiggy-Winkle.
