= The Tale of Mr. Jeremy Fisher =

Children's book by Beatrix Potter

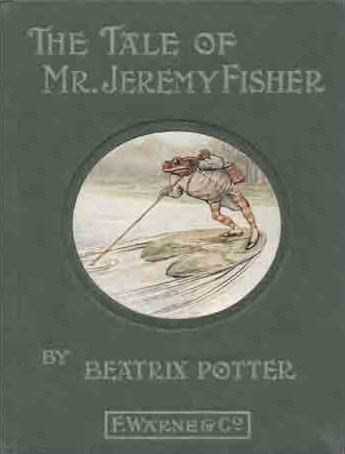
- First edition cover
- Author: Beatrix Potter
- Illustrator: Beatrix Potter
- Language: English
- Genre: Children's literature
- Publisher: Frederick Warne & Co.
- Publication date: July 1906
- Publication place: England
- Media type: Print (Hardcover)
- Preceded by: The Tale of the Pie and the Patty-Pan
- Followed by: The Story of a Fierce Bad Rabbit
- Text: The Tale of Mr. Jeremy Fisher at Wikisource

The Tale of Mr. Jeremy Fisher is a children's book, written and illustrated by Beatrix Potter. It was published by Frederick Warne & Co. in July 1906. Jeremy's origin lies in a letter she wrote to a child in 1893. She revised it in 1906, and moved its setting from the River Tay to the English Lake District. The tale reflects her love for the Lake District and her admiration for children's illustrator Randolph Caldecott.

Jeremy Fisher is a frog that lives in a "slippy-sloppy" house at the edge of a pond. During one rainy day, he collects worms for fishing and sets off across the pond on his lily-pad boat. He plans to invite his friends for dinner if he catches more than five minnows. He encounters all sorts of setbacks to his goal, and escapes a large trout who tries to swallow him. He swims for shore, decides he will not go fishing again, and hops home.

Potter's tale pays homage to the leisurely summers her father and his companions passed sport fishing at rented country estates in Scotland. Following the tale's publication, a child fan wrote to Potter suggesting Jeremy find a wife. Potter responded with a series of miniature letters on the theme as if from Jeremy and his pals. Following Potter's death in 1943, licences were issued to various firms to produce the Potter characters. Jeremy and his friends were released as porcelain figurines, plush toys, and other merchandise.

== Plot ==
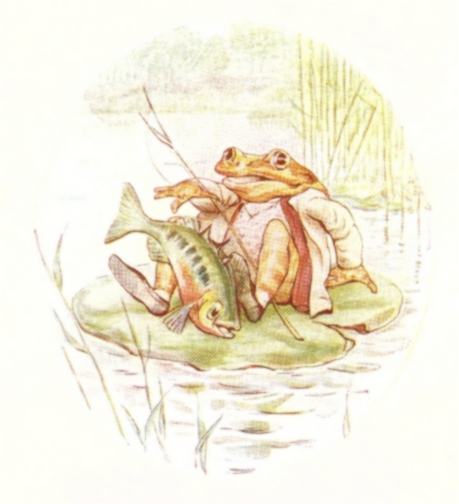
Mr Jeremy Fisher and the Stickleback.

Jeremy Fisher is a frog that lives in a damp little house amongst the buttercups at the edge of a pond. His larder and back passage are "slippy-sloppy" with water, but he likes getting his feet wet; no one ever scolds and he never catches cold. One day, Jeremy finds it raining and decides to go fishing. Should he catch more than five minnows, he would invite his friends to dinner. He puts on a mackintosh and shiny galoshes, takes his rod and basket, and sets off with "enormous hops" to the place where he keeps his lily-pad boat. He poles to a place he knows is good for minnows.

Once there, the frog sits cross-legged on his lily-pad and arranges his tackle. He has "the dearest little red float". His rod is a stalk of grass and his line a horsehair. An hour passes without a nibble. He takes a break and lunches on a butterfly sandwich. A water beetle tweaks his toe, causing him to withdraw his legs, and rats rustling about in the rushes force him to seek a safer location. He drops his line into the water and immediately has a bite. It is not a minnow but little Jack Sharp, a stickleback. Jeremy pricks his fingers on Jack's spines and Jack escapes. A shoal of little fishes come to the surface to laugh at Jeremy.

Jeremy sucks his sore fingers. A large trout rises from the water and seizes him with a snap (Mr. Jeremy screams, "OW-OW-OW!!!"). The trout dives to the bottom, but finds the taste of the mackintosh disgusting and spits Jeremy out, swallowing only his galoshes. Jeremy bounces "up to the surface of the water, like a cork and the bubbles out of a soda water bottle", and swims to the pond's edge. He scrambles up the bank and hops home through the meadow, having lost his fishing equipment but quite sure he will never go fishing again.

On returning home, Jeremy has put sticking plaster on his fingers and welcomes his two friends, Sir Isaac Newton, a newt; and Alderman Ptolemy Tortoise, a tortoise that eats salad. Isaac wears a black and gold waistcoat and Ptolemy brings a salad in a string bag. Jeremy has prepared a roasted grasshopper with ladybird sauce. The narrator describes the dish as a "beautiful treat", but thinks "it must have been nasty!"

== Background ==
In addition to the pet frogs of Potter's youth, influences on Jeremy include Potter's sport fishing father Rupert William Potter and illustrator Randolph Caldecott. Margaret Lane, author of The Magic Years of Beatrix Potter, notes, "Mr. Potter was fond of taking his friends fishing and Beatrix ... from an early age had been familiar with [the] hazards and excitements of angling and dry-fly fishing ... as a girl [she] had often enough had to endure her father and his friends relating their fishing adventures, and the picture of Mr Jeremy Fisher retailing his mishap to Sir Isaac Newton is so rich in observation, both of amphibians and elderly gentlemen, that one is ever afterwards prone to confuse them in memory". Mr. Potter not only fished for sport but collected the works of Randolph Caldecott. In Jeremy Fisher, Potter tried to copy Caldecott but felt she had failed. "I did try to copy Caldecott," she stated, "but ... I did not achieve much resemblance." Biographer Linda Lear writes Potter declared, "I have the greatest admiration for his work – a jealous appreciation; for I think that others, whose names are commonly bracketed with his, are not on the same plane at all as artist-illustrators".

Potter biographer Linda Lear and author of Beatrix Potter: A Life in Nature writes:

[Potter] wanted to do a frog story for some time, because it was amusing and offered the opportunity for the naturalist illustrations she delighted in ... The story of a fisherman down on his luck reminded Beatrix of the 'fish stories' her father's friends had told in Scotland, as well as her brother's travails with rod and reel. She also recreated the gentlemen's club atmosphere absorbed from her father's reports of evenings spent at the Reform and the Athenaeum ... The text and illustrations for this story are some of the most balanced and compatible of all her writing. Nature is described and illustrated truthfully: beautifully tranquil as well as unpredictably aggressive ....Its carefully coloured botanical backgrounds of water plants, a frog with anatomically correct turned-out feet, a trout that any self-respecting fisherman would enjoy snagging, and a rather frighteningly rendered water-beetle who tweaks Jeremy's dainty toes, all made it a delight to look at as well as to read.

== Production ==
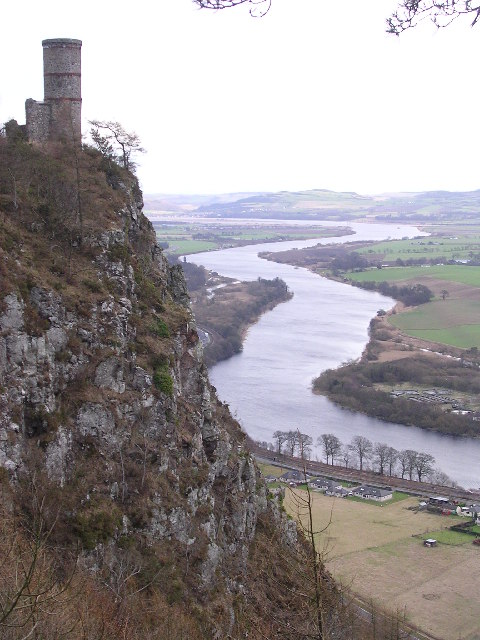
The River Tay (2004)

The origin of The Tale of Mr. Jeremy Fisher lies in a story letter Potter wrote to a child in September 1893 while summering on the River Tay. The following year, she created nine sketches called "A Frog he would a-fishing go" and sold them to publisher Ernest Nister. They were released with verses by Clifton Bingham in 1896.

Energized by the success of The Tale of Peter Rabbit in 1902, Potter considered expanding the frog tale and bought back her drawings and the publisher's printer's blocks. She wrote her editor Norman Warne, "I should like to do Mr. Jeremy Fisher ... I think I can make something of him". The tale was set aside while Potter and Warne developed other projects, but in 1905 he approved the frog tale. As Potter biographer Daphne Kutzner writes of Potter's illustrations for Jeremy: "When she finally did the illustrations for the book, she changed the original background from the River Tay in Scotland to Eswaithe Water in the Lakes. The illustrations are indeed lovely, showing Potter's skill both as a naturalist and a fantasist".

In August 1905, Norman Warne died, and his brother Harold became Potter's editor. She wrote to him indicating Norman had approved the frog project: "We had thought of doing ... "Mr. Jeremy Fisher" to carry on the series of little [books]. I know some people don't like frogs! but I think I had convinced Norman that I could make it a really pretty book with a good many flowers & water plants for backgrounds". Warne decided to put Jeremy Fisher into print.

In July 1906, 20,000 copies of The Tale of Mr. Jeremy Fisher were released in paper boards at a shilling and in decorated cloth at one shilling six pence in a small format. Another 5,000 copies were published in September 1906 and another 5,000 in September 1907. The book was dedicated to Stephanie Hyde Parker, the daughter of Potter's cousin Ethel, Lady Hyde Parker: "For Stephanie from Cousin B". Jeremy sold as profitably as other Potter productions.

== Themes and style ==
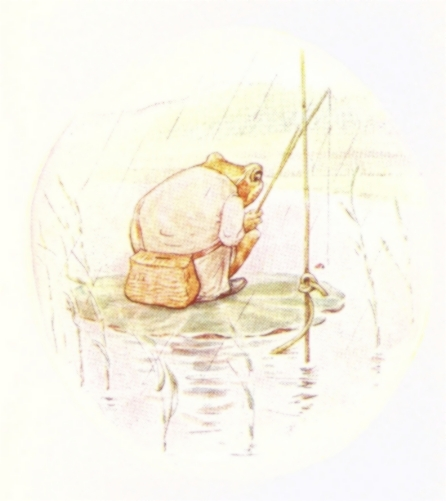
Mr. Jeremy Fisher fishing.

M. Daphne Kutzer, Professor of English at State University of New York at Plattsburgh and author of Beatrix Potter: Writing in Code, observes that the social positions of Jeremy and his friends are established through the clothing they wear. Although Potter sharply critiqued the upper class elsewhere, Kutzer observes that in Jeremy Fisher her tone is more moderate. She suggests that Potter's relocation to Sawrey and Hill Top Farm may have produced in her a willingness "to accept the silliness of the aspiring middle class as well as the eccentricities of the upper classes".

Ruth K. MacDonald, Professor of English at New Mexico State University and author of Beatrix Potter points out that although Potter regarded the lives of her father and his friends as comical and even beneath notice, yet she clearly respected and valued their outdoor pursuits from the bemused treatment she accorded them in Jeremy Fisher. She valued nature untouched by humans even more, MacDonald notes, as evidenced by the careful observation in the illustrations. Jeremy Fisher was written without the many revisions typical of Potter's other productions, and the pictures appear effortless in their execution. MacDonald writes, "Her ability to show human society without also implying its damaging effects on flora and fauna further underscores the book's felicitous composition and success".

Literary scholar Humphrey Carpenter writes in Secret Gardens: The Golden Age of Children's Literature the basis for Potter's writing style can be found in the Authorized King James Version of the Bible. Jeremy Fisher reflects the characteristic cadence and "employs a psalm-like caesura in the middle of [a] sentence".

Carpenter sees in Potter's work thematic shifts from the early work onward. In the first stage of her work, he sees in stories such as The Tale of Peter Rabbit a type of Jack-the-Giant-Killer theme, in which a small creature confronts a large creature that he believes culminates in The Tale of Jeremy Fisher. Potter places Jeremy Fisher in a dangerous world, according to Carpenter. The fishing experience is frightening: the bank-side creatures worry him, the stickleback threatens him directly, and the trout tries to swallow him. But Potter makes the point that all creatures are prey, ending the story with Jeremy Fisher himself eating a grasshopper smothered in lady-bird sauce.

== Miniature letters ==
About 1907 Potter created miniature letters delivered to child fans in either a miniature mail bag or a miniature mail box. "Some of the letters were very funny," Potter wrote, "The defect was that inquiries and answers were all mixed up."

Four Jeremy letters were written at about 1910 to Drew Fayle who thought Jeremy should marry. In one letter, Sir Isaac promises Master Fayle a piece of wedding cake should Jeremy marry and, in another letter, Ptolemy writes that Jeremy's parties "would be much more agreeable if there were a lady to preside at the table." Jeremy writes in the third letter: "When I bought my sprigged waistcoat & my maroon tail-coat I had hopes ... but I am alone ... if there were a 'Mrs. Jeremy Fisher' she might object to snails. It is some satisfaction to be able to have as much water & mud in the house as a person likes."

Mrs. Tiggy-winkle, a hedgehog washerwoman in another Potter tale, writes Master Fayle in the fourth letter:

Dear Master Drew,

If you please Sir I am a widow; & I think it very wrong that there is not any Mrs. Fisher, but I would not marry Mr. Jeremy not for worlds, the way he does live in that house all slippy-sloppy; not any lady would stand it, & not a bit of good starching his cravats.

Yr. obedient washerwoman,
Tiggy Winkle.

== Merchandise ==
The characters from Jeremy Fisher have appeared as porcelain figurines, plush toys, and other merchandise. In 1950, Beswick Pottery issued a porcelain figurine of Jeremy and figurines of Isaac and Ptolemy in the 1970s. Other figurines of Jeremy have been produced over the years as well as a Jeremy mug. Jeremy was one of the first eight plush toys released by Eden Toys, Inc. of New York in 1973. The following year, he was released as a 37 inches (94 cm) "Giant" intended for store displays, and during the Beanie Baby era as a beanbag. Isaac Newton was on store shelves for two years.

Jeremy Fisher was one of the first ten character music boxes released by Schmid & Co. in 1977. Ptolemy and Isaac boxes were released in the 1980s. Ceramic Christmas ornaments of Jeremy have been released by Schmid. Other merchandise includes a variety of Crummles enamelled boxes, an ANRI wood carving and ANRI Toriart figurines and ornaments, and Huntley & Palmer biscuit tins.

== Reprints and translations ==
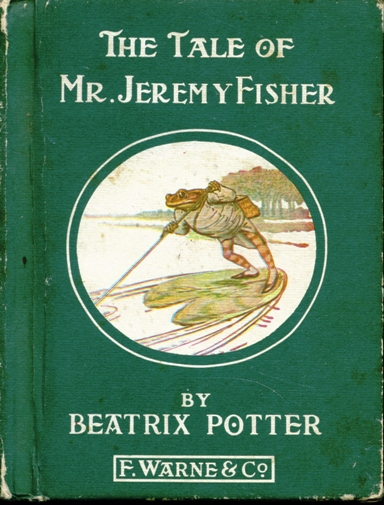
Cover of the Tale of Mr. Jeremy Fisher

As of 2010, all 23 of Potter's small format books remain in print, and are available as complete sets in presentation boxes, and as a 400-page omnibus edition. The English language editions of the tales still bore the Frederick Warne imprint in 2010 though the company was bought by Penguin Books in 1983. Penguin remade the printing plates in 1985, and all 23 volumes were released in 1987 as The Original and Authorized Edition.

Although sold to Penguin Books in 1984 as a subsidiary company, Frederick Warne continues to publish Potter's books. A 2002 Publishers Weekly article, written for the centennial of the publication of The Tale of Peter Rabbit, reported that Potter was considered one of the top most popular classic writers, that anniversary editions of her work were published in 1993 and 2002, and the artwork has been "re-scanned to make the illustrations look fresher and brighter".

The Tale of Mr. Jeremy Fisher was published in French in 1940 as Jérémie Pêche-à-la-Ligne, and in Dutch as Jeremais de Hengelaar in 1946. The tale was republished in Dutch in 1970 as Het Verhaal van Jeremais Hengelaar and was published in the Initial Teaching Alphabet in 1965. In 1984, the tale was again translated into French by M.A. James as L’histoire de Monsieur Jérémie Peche-a-la-Ligne. In 1986 MacDonald wrote that Potter's books had become a "traditional part of childhood in most only English-speaking countries and in many of the countries into whose languages Potter's books have been translated".

== Works cited ==
- Ahearn, Allen and Patricia (1995), Book Collecting, Putnam, ISBN 0-399-14049-2
- Carpenter, Humphrey (1985), Secret Gardens: The Golden Age of Children's Literature, Houghton Mifflin, ISBN 0-395-35293-2
- "Copying Caldecott" Guide to and commentary on The Beatrix Potter Collection (Prints and Books collection) at the Victoria and Albert Museum, Victoria and Albert Museum, archived from the original on 8 January 2011
- Dubay, Debby; Sewall, Kara (2006), Beatrix Potter Collectibles: The Peter Rabbit Story Characters, Schiffer Publishing Ltd., ISBN 0-7643-2358-X
- Kutzer, M. Daphne (2003), Beatrix Potter: Writing in Code, Routledge, ISBN 0-415-94352-3
- Lane, Margaret (1978), The Magic Years of Beatrix Potter, Frederick Warne & Co. Inc., ISBN 0-7232-2108-1
- Lear, Linda (2007), Beatrix Potter: A Life in Nature, St. Martin's Griffin, ISBN 978-0-312-37796-0
- Linder, Leslie (1971), A History of the Writings of Beatrix Potter, Frederick Warne & Co. Inc., ISBN 0-7232-1334-8
- MacDonald, Ruth K. (1986), Beatrix Potter, Twayne Publishers, ISBN 0-8057-6917-X
- Potter, Beatrix (2002) [1906], The Tale of Mr. Jeremy Fisher, Frederick Warne, ISBN 978-0-7232-4776-0
- Taylor, Judy; Whalley, Joyce Irene; Hobbs, Anne Stevenson; Battrick, Elizabeth M. (1987), Beatrix Potter 1866–1943: The Artist and Her World, F. Warne & Co. and The National Trust, ISBN 0-7232-3561-9
- Taylor, Judy (1996) [1986], Beatrix Potter: Artist, Storyteller, Countrywoman, Frederick Warne, ISBN 0-7232-4175-9
