= The Tale of Benjamin Bunny =

Children's book by Beatrix Potter

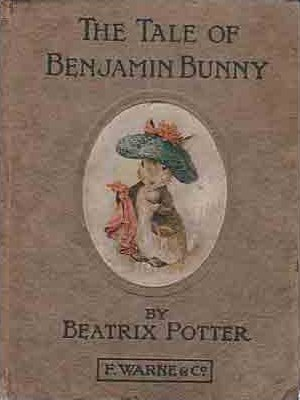
- Author: Beatrix Potter
- Illustrator: Beatrix Potter
- Language: English
- Genre: Children's literature
- Publisher: Frederick Warne & Co.
- Publication date: September 1904
- Publication place: England, United Kingdom
- Media type: Print (hardcover)
- Preceded by: The Tailor of Gloucester
- Followed by: The Tale of Two Bad Mice
- Text: The Tale of Benjamin Bunny at Wikisource

The Tale of Benjamin Bunny is a children's book written and illustrated by Beatrix Potter, and first published by Frederick Warne & Co. in September 1904. The book is a sequel to The Tale of Peter Rabbit (1902), and tells of Peter's return to Mr. McGregor's garden with his cousin Benjamin to retrieve the clothes he lost there during his previous adventure. In Benjamin Bunny, Potter deepened the rabbit universe she created in Peter Rabbit, and, in doing so, suggested the rabbit world was parallel to the human world but complete and sufficient unto itself.

In 1903, Potter and her publisher decided her next book should be less complicated than her previous productions, and in Benjamin Bunny she created a simple, didactic tale for young children. The book's masterful illustrations were based upon the several gardens at the Lake District estate of Fawe Park, where Potter spent the summer of 1903. She was sensitive to the openings and endings of her books, and insisted Benjamin Bunny finish with the words "rabbit-tobacco", a term she appropriated from the Uncle Remus stories by Joel Chandler Harris, one of her literary heroes.

Benjamin Bunny was an instant commercial and popular success, and thousands of copies were in print by the end of 1904. The Times Literary Supplement thought Potter's illustrations "pencil perfect", but suggested that she engage a literary assistant for future productions. Potter created a nursery wallpaper tapping Benjamin's image, and Benjamin returned as an adult rabbit in the Flopsy Bunnies and Mr. Tod. In 1992, Benjamin Bunny was adapted as an episode of the BBC animated television series, The World of Peter Rabbit and Friends.

== Plot ==
Benjamin Bunny, a strong-willed rabbit sits on a bank by a road. Benjamin hears a gig (carriage) coming down the road. In the gig are Mr. McGregor driving, and Mrs. McGregor sat beside him in her best bonnet, meaning the couple are surely going out for the whole day. Benjamin goes to visit his cousin Peter Rabbit, who lives with his family in a burrow under a large tree at the end of the woods near Mr. McGregor’s garden. However, when he gets to his family's home, he decides not to ask his Aunt Josephine or other cousins Flopsy, Mopsy and Cotton-Tail where Peter is due to not being overly fond of them. Benjamin finds Peter sulking outside the tree, wearing only a red handkerchief. Peter tells Benjamin that his jacket and shoes are being used as a scarecrow in Mr. McGregor’s garden. Peter explains how he nearly got killed while in the garden.

Benjamin informs Peter that both the McGregors will be out, possibly for the whole day, so they could venture into Mr. McGregor's garden to retrieve the clothes Peter lost there in The Tale of Peter Rabbit. Peter reluctantly agrees. The cousins go into the Garden, however not under the gate like Peter did last time, but by climbing down a pear tree. They find the blue jacket and brown shoes on the scarecrow, which Peter puts on. Unfortunately for Peter, the jacket has shrunk in the rain last night and the shoes have water in them when they are taken off the Scarecrow. Benjamin finds a tam o' shanter hat on the Scarecrow as well, and does try it on, but the hat is too big for him. Benjamin decides they should use the handkerchief Peter had wrapped around him, to carry some onions, because they could give the onions to Peter’s mother as a present to get on her good side. Peter is terrified of lingering in the garden, fearing that Mr. and Mrs. McGregor might return, but Benjamin is right at home, telling Peter that he and his father (known as Old Mr. Bunny) come to the Garden every Sunday, to get lettuces for lunch. After gathering the onions, Benjamin agrees that they can go. Around a corner however, they see a cat and hide under a basket, but the cat is drawn to the smell of onions and sits on top of the basket, trapping the pair for five hours. Old Mr. Bunny (Benjamin's father) enters the garden, searching for them. He whips the cat and surprises it so much that she doesn’t fight back. After locking the cat in the greenhouse, he finds his son Benjamin and nephew Peter and is glad they are safe and unharmed, however is furious they left him worried and whips both Rabbits very hard, making them cry.

Once he gets home, Peter gives the onions to his mother, who forgives his adventure because he has managed to recover his lost jacket and shoes. Then he and Cottontail fold up the pocket handkerchief and their mother strings the onions and rabbit tobacco from the ceiling. Following his return to the garden, Mr. McGregor is puzzled by the ridiculously small footprints, the scarecrow's missing clothes and the cat locked in the greenhouse.

== Background ==
In 1901, Potter privately published The Tale of Peter Rabbit, and, in 1902, Frederick Warne & Co. published a trade edition of the book, which was hugely successful. In 1904, she followed Peter Rabbit with its sequel, The Tale of Benjamin Bunny, and continued the rabbit saga in 1909 with The Tale of the Flopsy Bunnies and in 1912 with The Tale of Mr. Tod. All the tales were in part inspired by Joel Chandler Harris's Uncle Remus stories, which Potter illustrated as early as 1893 in an attempt to find a career direction. Potter was unable to successfully translate Harris's characters to the English country garden, but she transformed the American author's "lippity-clippity, clippity-lippity" to "lippity-lippity" in Peter Rabbit, and used his "rabbit tobacco" (lavender) in Benjamin Bunny and Mr. Tod. None of her rabbit characters were based on Br'er Rabbit; Harris's rabbit wins by cunning, but Potter's Benjamin and Peter win by pure luck. Potter scholar Ruth K. MacDonald has assessed the rabbit universe in Potter as a more pleasant place than that found in Harris's stories.

== Composition and publication ==
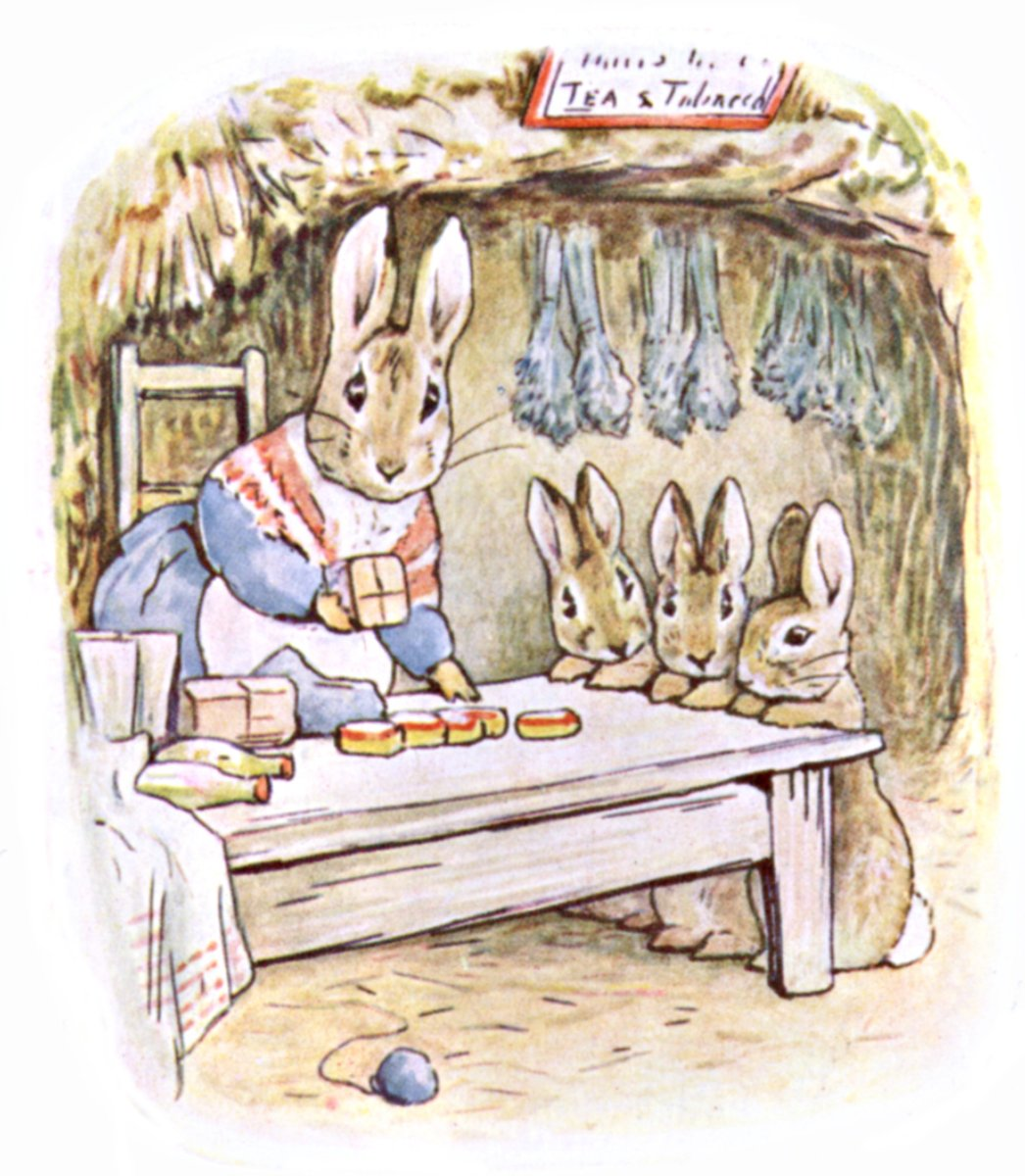
Peter's mother selling "herbs, and rosemary tea, and rabbit-tobacco". The concept was cut from Peter Rabbit; here it suggests a rabbit world, parallel to the human one, and complete unto itself.

In July 1903, Potter suggested to her publisher, Frederick Warne & Co. that the book to follow The Tale of Squirrel Nutkin and The Tailor of Gloucester ought to be something less complex than the two previous productions. She had several possible stories in mind and outlined them for the firm, but was anxious to settle on a choice as quickly as possible to guide her sketching while on holiday. It was decided between Potter and her publisher that one of the two books for 1904 would be Benjamin Bunny. Benjamin Bunny had been mentioned in the manuscript of the privately printed edition of Peter Rabbit but had been dropped as irrelevant to the tale. A picture of his father was included in the private edition although he has no part in the story.

Potter was sensitive to the beginnings and endings of her books and usually avoided the conventional at those key places. The publisher did not like the Benjamin Bunny ending, but she refused to alter it to their suggested "happily ever after" because such an ending in her estimation was "rather trite" and "inexact". She suggested the last paragraph as it now appears in the book with the comment, "I would like the book to end with the word 'rabbit-tobacco', it is a rather fine word." She rewrote several other passages including twice rewriting the passage depicting Mr. McGregor's discovery of the cat locked in the greenhouse.

Summering at Fawe Park in Keswick, Cumbria with her parents, Potter filled her sketchbook with pictures of the estate's several gardens including the kitchen garden and its greenhouses, cold frames, potting shed, and espaliered fruit trees. Her father photographed Fawe Park and Potter probably used his photographs (or her own) as an aid in her work. The picture of Old Mr. Bunny attacking the cat did not satisfy her publisher, and she redrew it as she did the picture of Benjamin and Peter standing on the garden wall. In Peter Rabbit, Mr. McGregor's garden was in Perthshire, but in Benjamin Bunny, the rabbit clan and the garden setting were moved to the Lake District, where they remained for The Tale of Mr. Tod, the final book of the Peter Rabbit saga.

During her London winter, Potter developed her work, and, by the middle of June 1904, Benjamin Bunny was almost finished. Many of the sketches from her Fawe Park holiday were little altered in their migration to the book, and, upon completion of the work, Potter declared she was relieved to be finished with the rabbits.

The book was dedicated to "the children of Sawrey from old Mr. Bunny". Beginnings and endings of tales were important to Potter and she specified Benjamin Bunny was to end with the words, "rabbit tobacco" – a term from Uncle Remus she had made her own.

Twenty thousand copies were published and released in September 1904. Within a month, reprints were ordered, and another ten thousand copies were printed at year's end. Much to her embarrassment, Potter realized "muffettees" (a muff worn at the wrist) was misspelled, but the error was not corrected until the third printing.

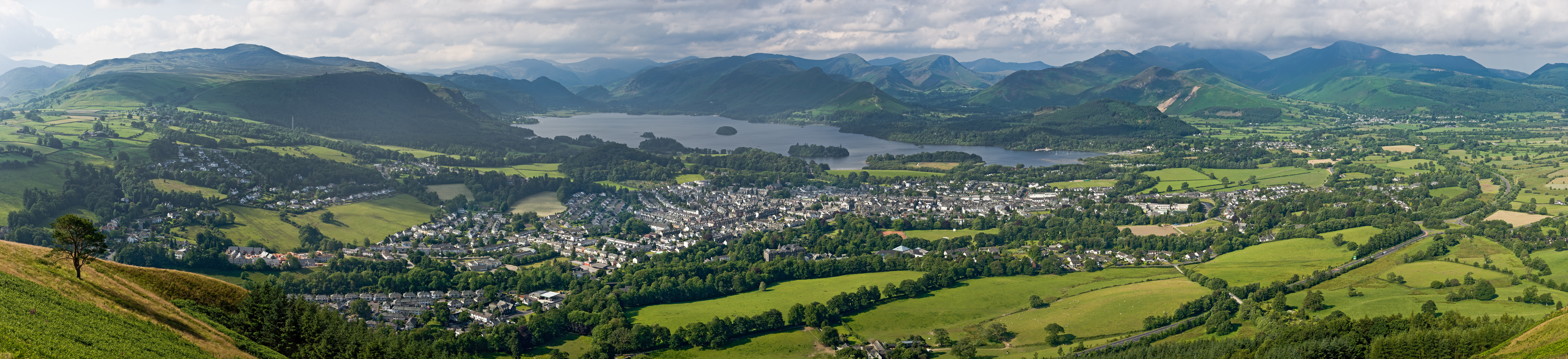
A panoramic view of Keswick, Derwentwater, and the surrounding fells. Potter summered at Fawe Park in Keswick in 1903, and its kitchen garden became background for Benjamin Bunny. Derwentwater was the setting for The Tale of Squirrel Nutkin in 1903.

== Illustrations ==
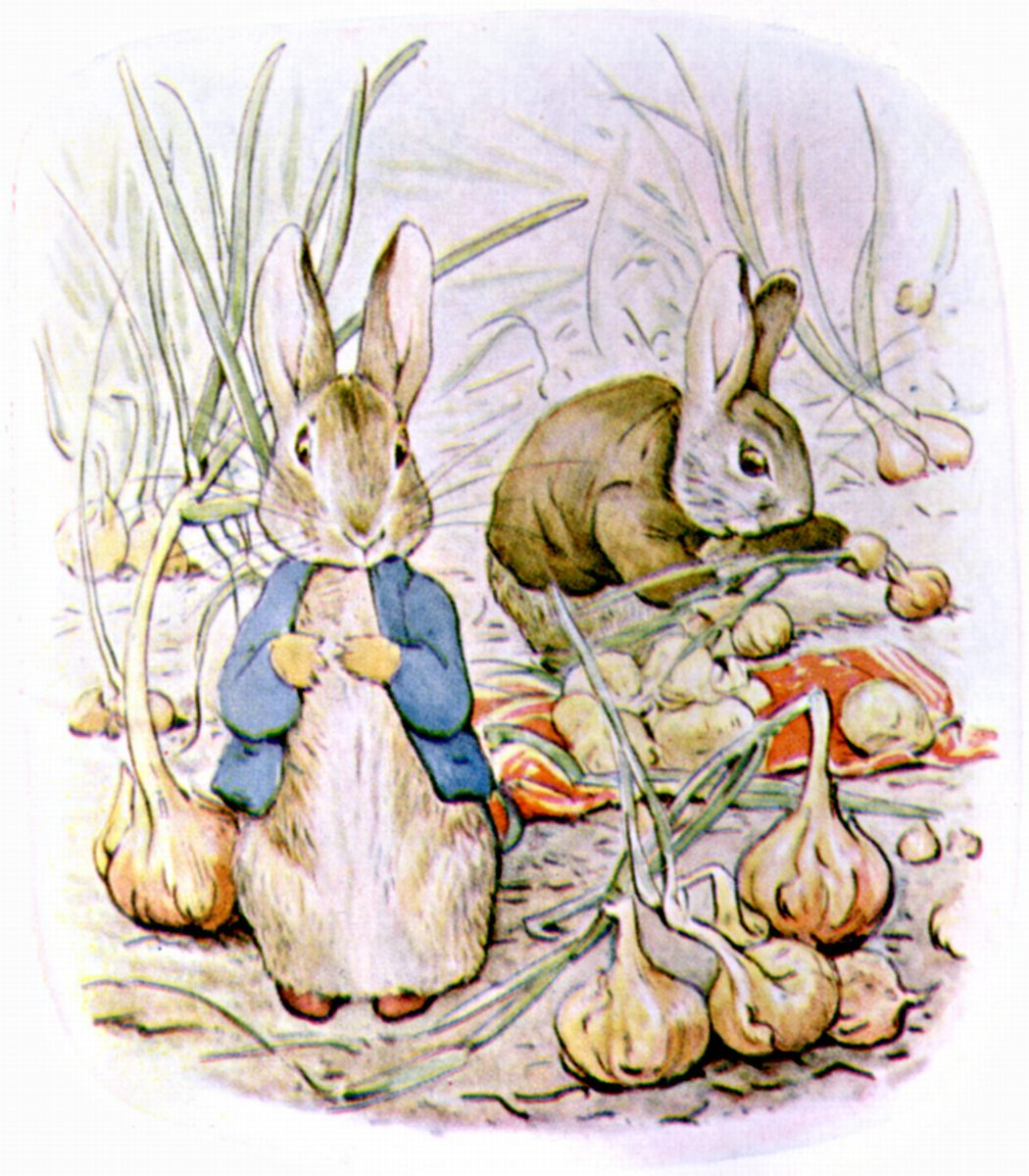
Peter and Benjamin gather onions for Mrs. Rabbit

Potter borrowed a cat, and took a pet rabbit to Fawe Park as models. Her meticulous preparation before finalizing an illustration was noted in a letter to Warne: "I think I have done every imaginable rabbit background and miscellaneous sketches as well – about seventy! I hope you will like them, though rather scribbled." Scribbled or not, the work is of the highest quality with the sketches of onions and red carnations (which were dropped as the frontispiece) being chief examples. The illustrations communicate her obvious appreciation and love for the humble pots, onions, and flowers of the garden. Many of the objects in the illustrations – the gate, the potting shed, the wall – have changed little over the years and are recognizable today from her illustrations. Aware the type of story she was writing was set primarily in colours of fawn, brown, and soft green, Potter wrote that, "the (red) handkerchief will make a good bit of colour all through the book."

== Critical reception ==
The tale was well received by The Scotsman, but The Times Literary Supplement was not entirely enthusiastic:

Among the little books that have become as much a manifestation of autumn as falling leaves, one looks first for whatever Miss Beatrix Potter gives ... In her new book ... although there is no diminution in the charm and drollery of the drawings, Miss Potter's fancy is not what it was. The story is inconclusive. Next year we think she must call in a literary assistant. We have no hesitation in calling her pencil perfect.

Potter biographer Linda Lear notes that none of the rabbit books subsequent to Peter Rabbit appealed to Potter with the passion she experienced for the original, but, in Benjamin Bunny, she successfully wrote a simple, didactic tale for very young children that was less complicated than The Tale of Squirrel Nutkin and The Tailor of Gloucester. Benjamin Bunny however lacked the vitality of her previous efforts because it was made to order rather than allowed to flower from a picture letter to real children in the manner of Peter Rabbit and Squirrel Nutkin. The weak story line of Benjamin Bunny is evidence of her dwindling interest in continuing the Peter Rabbit saga, but the book displays a delight in place, a deep understanding of rabbit anatomy and behaviour, and beautifully miniaturized illustrations of vegetable gardens. Benjamin Bunny presented demands upon Potter she had not encountered in her previous three tales. She had depleted all her sketchbook backgrounds in the production of the other tales and was forced to create new ones, but the greatest challenge to Potter's artistry was consciously working to satisfy both her publisher's demand for another commercial success and her public's expectation of a tale as delightful as her others while labouring under the pressure to produce a sequel to a work of genius.

== Merchandising and adaptations ==
Benjamin became a motif in a nursery wallpaper designed by Potter shortly after the tale's publication. Benjamin and Peter made a cameo appearance in the artwork of Potter's The Tale of Mrs. Tiggy-Winkle (1905), and returned as adult rabbits in The Tale of the Flopsy Bunnies (1909) and The Tale of Mr. Tod (1912).

In 1992, an animated adaptation of the story was integrated with The Tale of Peter Rabbit and telecast on the BBC anthology series, The World of Peter Rabbit and Friends. Benjamin also appeared in the episodes, The Tale of Mr. Tod and The Tale of the Flopsy Bunnies and Mrs. Tittlemouse, along with Peter. Also in the BBC adaptation, Peter Rabbit's mother's first name is revealed to be Josephine, while in the actual books, her first name is not given. In the CBeebies British and Nick Jr. American CGI animated children's television series, Benjamin is voiced by Peter Steve Harris in the US version and Danny Price in the U.K. version.

Benjamin appears in the 2018 animated/live-action film adaptation of Peter Rabbit, voiced by Colin Moody, as a sidekick character. Moody also reprised his role for the 2021 sequel. However, unlike his book counterpart, Benjamin is much more timid, but also very wise, often trying to be the voice of reason for Peter.

Royal Doulton sold a porcelain figurine of Benjamin's father punishing Peter from 1975 to 1988.
