= Brockhole =

Visitor centre in Cumbria, England

Brockhole Lake District Visitor Centre
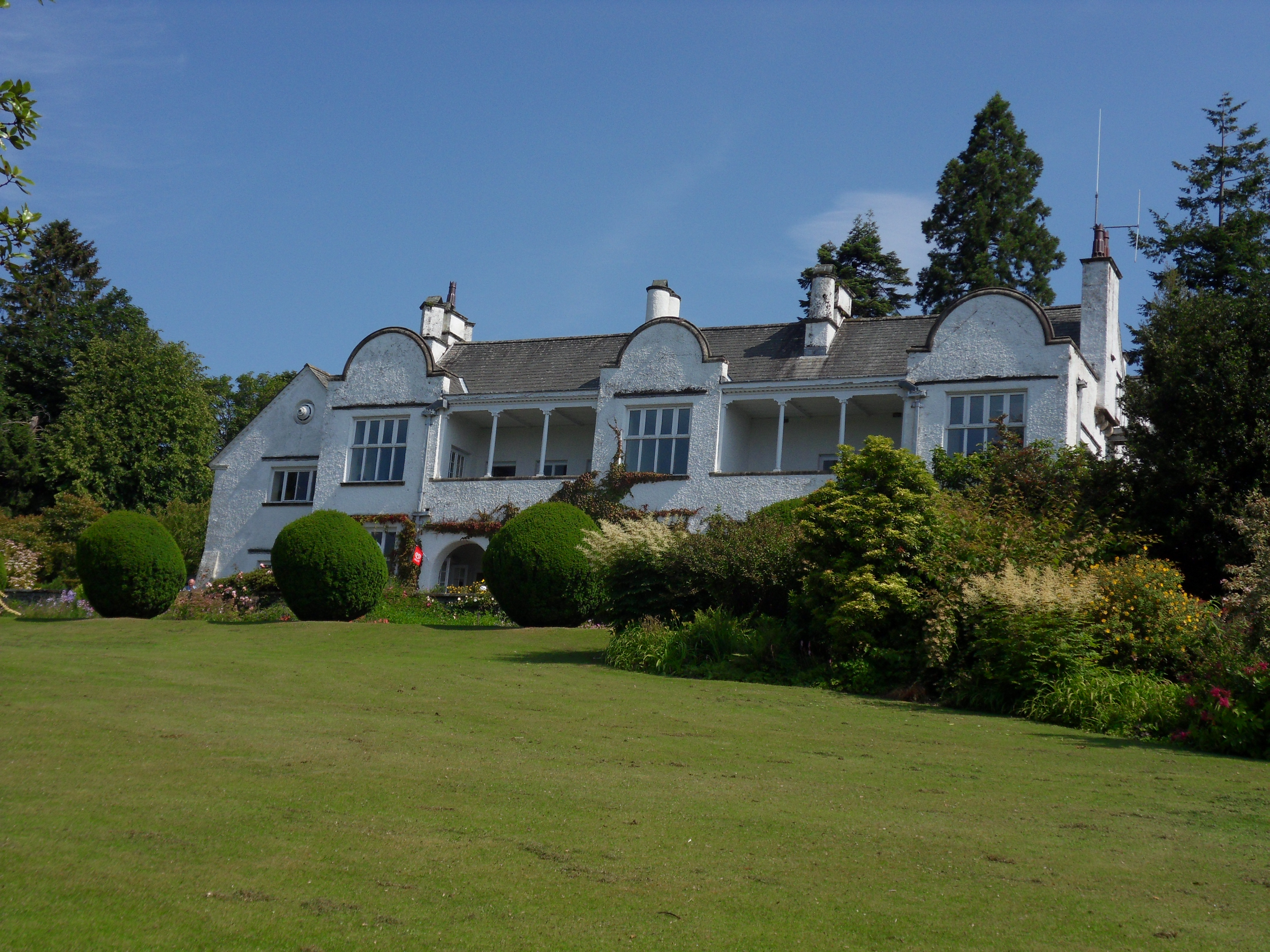
- Brockhole House

- Location within Cumbria

General information
- Location: shore of Lake Windermere, Cumbria, England, United Kingdom
- Coordinates: 54.401026°N 2.942883°W

The Brockhole Lake District Visitor Centre, also known as the Brockhole National Park Visitor Centre, is a visitor centre and tourist attraction managed by BeWILDerwood. It is situated on the shore of Lake Windermere, roughly equidistant between the towns of Bowness-on-Windermere and Ambleside. It includes the Brockhole house and 30 acres (12 ha) of grounds, including 10 acres (4.0 ha) of formal gardens and an adventure playground.

Entrance to the grounds is free of charge, although a charge is made for car parking.

== History ==
The site that is now the visitor centre was bought in 1896 by William Gaddum, a silk merchant from Manchester, to build a summer house. He had the house built the following year, to a design by the architect Dan Gibson. The gardens were created by Thomas Mawson. Mawson, who is known for his work in the design of gardens during the Arts and Crafts movement, had previously collaborated with Gibson at Graythwaite Hall.

Beatrix Potter was a frequent visitor to the house, and makes reference to it in her Journals. In 1946 William Gaddum died and the house was sold. In 1948 the house was converted into a convalescent home. The Lake District National Park Authority purchased the property in 1966, and in 1969 it was opened as the UK's first National Park Visitor Centre. The centre organised a number of activities, including orienteering, kayaking and open water swimming, as well as regular exhibitions, and the closed in March 2025.

The park and gardens are grade II listed.

== Transport links ==
The centre is situated off the A591 road between Windermere and Ambleside. Stagecoach bus routes 555 (Lancaster to Keswick) and 599 (Bowness-on-Windermere to Grasmere) stop outside the centre. Both these routes also serve Windermere railway station.

In the grounds of the centre is a jetty served by a number of boat services provided by Windermere Lake Cruises between March and October. A passenger launch service runs from Ambleside, returning to Ambleside via Wray Castle on the opposite side of the lake. A second launch service runs from Bowness-on-Windermere, returning to Bowness via Ambleside. A third service, known as the Bike Boat and operated with a boat adapted to carry cycles, shuttles across the lake to and from Bark Barn in Claife.

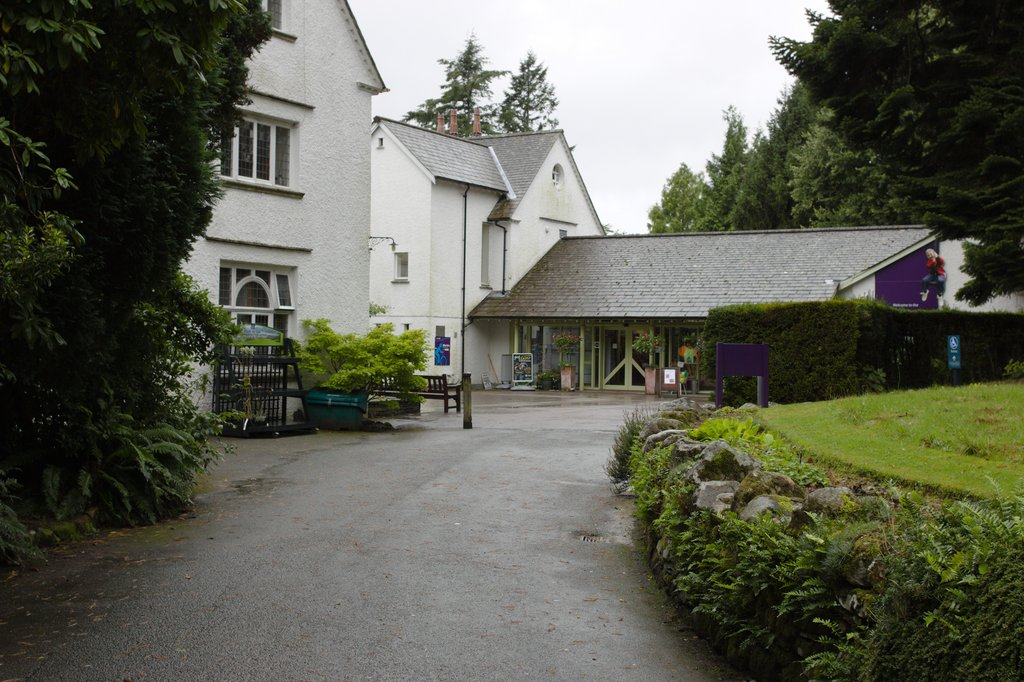
The entrance

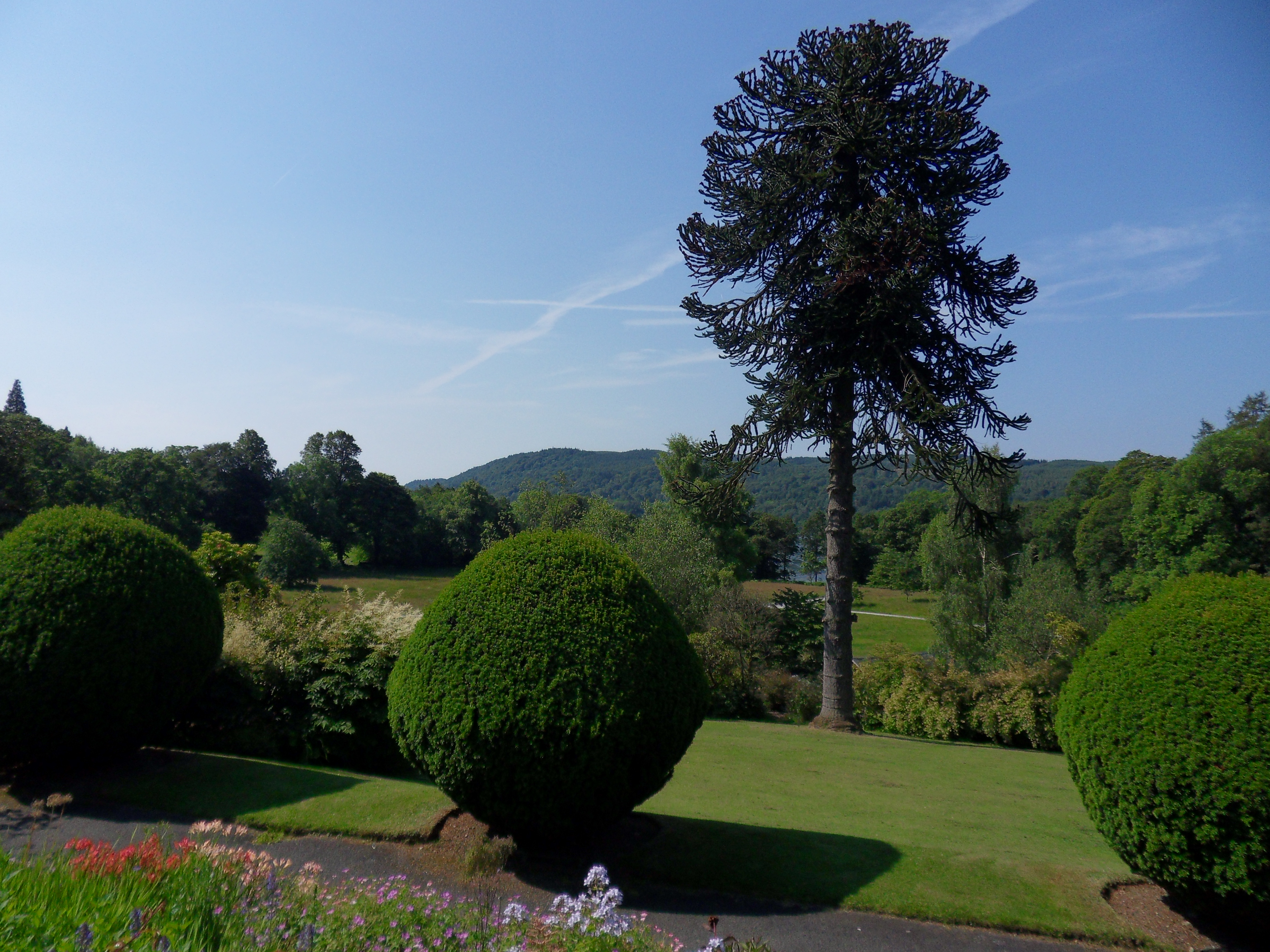
The gardens

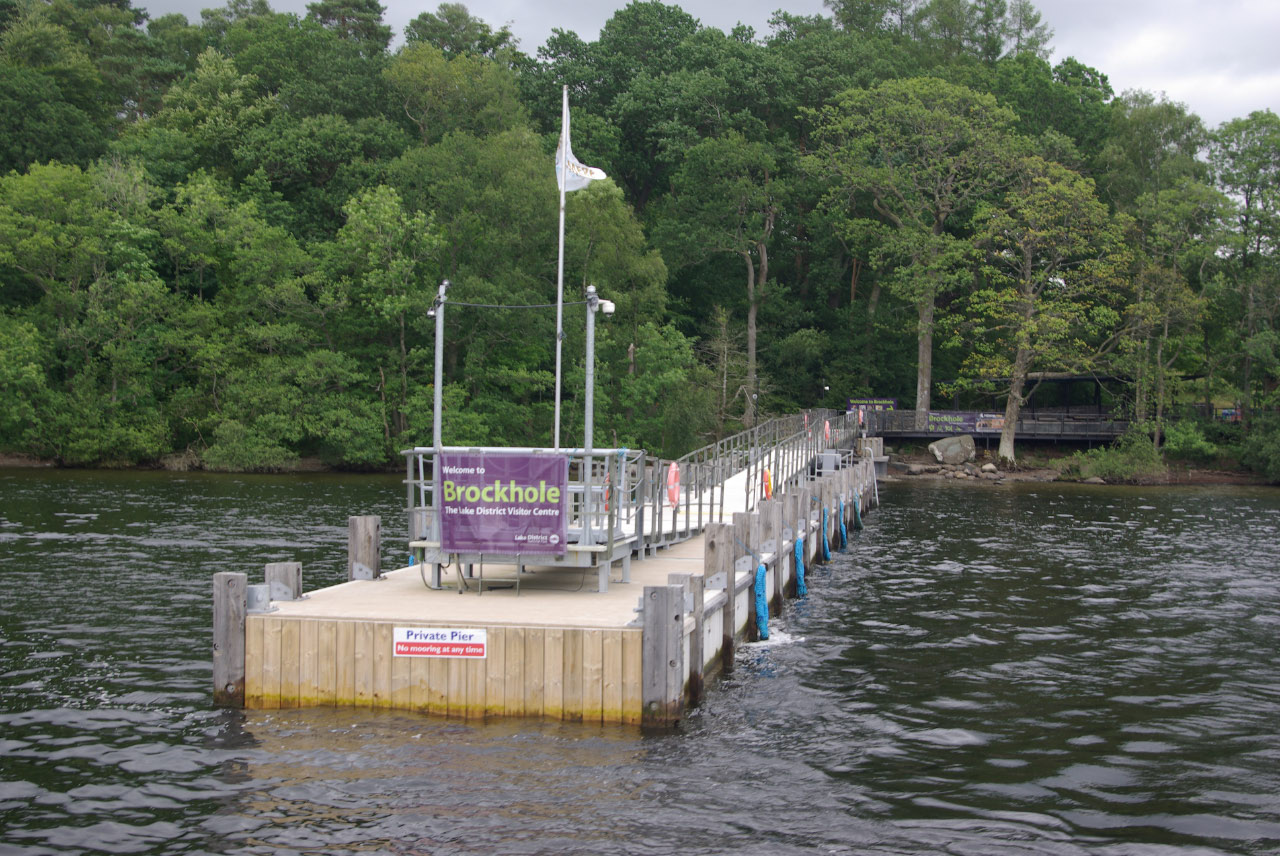
The jetty

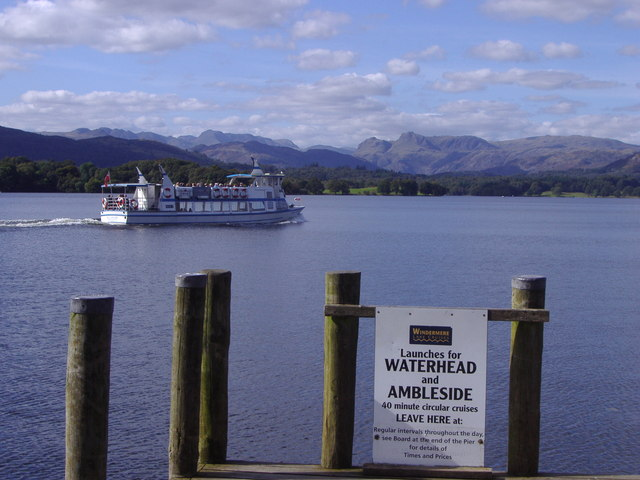
The view
