= Windermere Lake Cruises =

Boat operating company in Windermere, England

- Company type: Private company
- Industry: Passenger transportation Leisure cruises
- Predecessor: Bowness Bay Boating Company, Ambleside Motor Launch Company, Windermere Iron Steamboat Company, British Rail (Sealink)
- Headquarters: Bowness-on-Windermere, Cumbria, England
- Number of locations: 3
- Area served: Windermere
- Services: Cruises and Self Drive Hire boats
- Number of employees: up to 150
- Parent: Winander Leisure Limited
- Website: www.windermere-lakecruises.co.uk

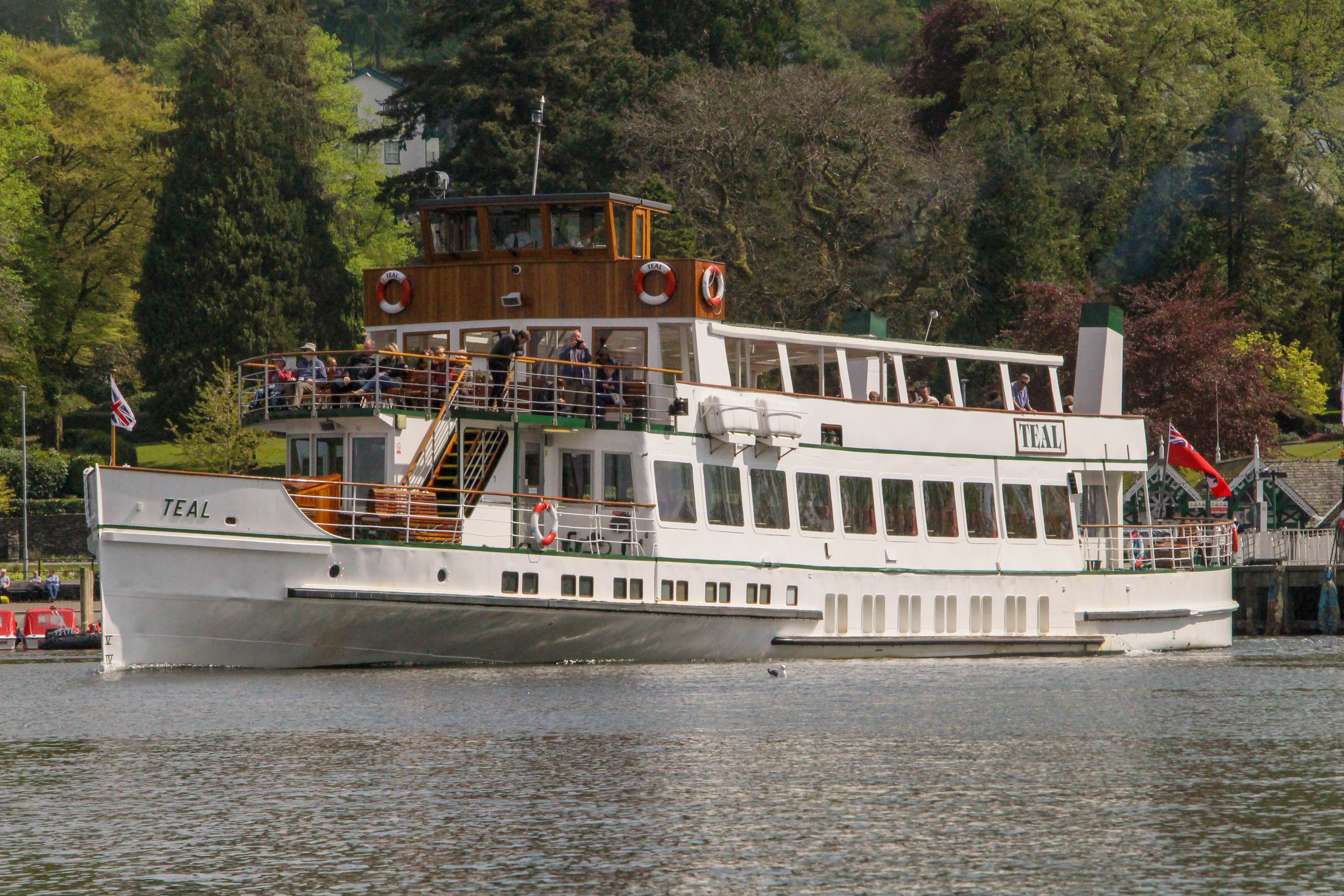
Teal at Bowness

Windermere Lake Cruises is a boat company which provides leisure trips on Windermere in the central part of the English Lake District. It is based in Bowness-on-Windermere, Cumbria.

== History ==
Windermere is the largest natural lake in England, and has supported commercial traffic for many years. In the early 19th century sailing packets operated the length of the lake carrying both passengers and goods. The first steamship on the lake, and indeed on any lake in England, was the paddle steamer Lady of the Lake, launched in 1845 for the Windermere Steam Yacht Company. In 1847 a second company, the Windermere Iron Steamboat Company, put into service the Firefly, following that by the Dragonfly in 1850. After some years of competition, the two companies merged as the Windermere United Yacht Company in 1858. This company introduced the steamers Rothay (1867) and the Swan (1869). The Rothay was the last paddle steamer built for use on the lake, with all subsequent vessels being propeller driven.

In 1869 the Furness Railway opened its branch from Ulverston to Lakeside station, intended as an interchange between train and steamer at the southern end of the lake. The railway company had already purchased shares in the Windermere United Yacht Company, and in 1872 it took full control. In 1871 the Furness Railway had purchased the steam barge Raven, which in addition to carrying cargo to houses, hotels and businesses around the lake, also served as an ice-breaker for the passenger steamers. Other vessels introduced after the Furness Railway took over the yacht company include the Cygnet (1879), Teal (1879), Tern (1891), Swift (1900) and Britannia (built in 1879 and acquired second-hand in 1909). The Rothay was scrapped in 1891 and the Britannia in 1919.

In 1923, with the grouping of the railways, the lake steamers came under the control of the London, Midland and Scottish Railway (LMS). The LMS built two motor vessels for use on Windermere, the Teal (1936) and the Swan (1938). The Raven was sold out of service in 1927, and is now an exhibit at the Windermere Steamboat Museum, whilst the earlier Teal was scrapped in 1929 and the earlier Swan in 1938.

In 1948, the Windermere steamers came under the control of the British Transport Commission as part of the nationalisation of the British railways, passing to the British Railways Board or British Rail in 1963, along with all other railway related shipping services. In 1970 the British Rail shipping services were rebranded as Sealink, with the Windermere operation being known as Sealink Windermere. The Cygnet was scrapped in 1955.

In 1984, as part of the privatisation of the British railways, Sealink was sold to Sea Containers who resurrected the Windermere Iron Steamboat Company name for its Windermere operations. In 1993 the Windermere Iron Steamboat Company was bought by the local Bowness Bay Boating Company, who already operated a fleet of launches on the lake, and the merged operation renamed Windermere Lake Cruises. The Swift was scrapped in 1999, having been laid up since 1981, but a new Swift joined the fleet in 2020.

== Operation ==
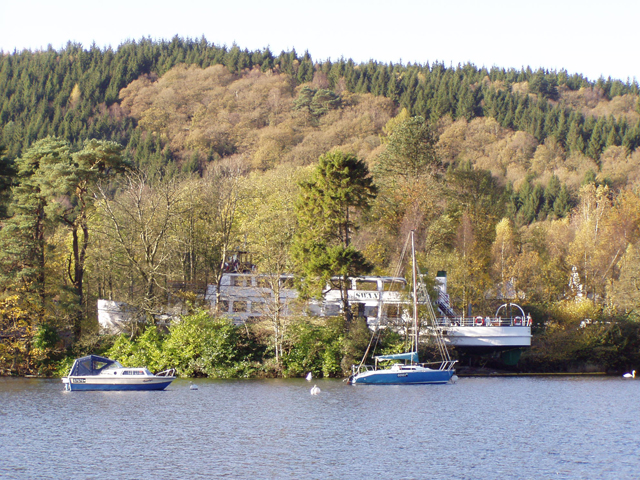
Swan on the slipway at Lakeside

The headquarters of Windermere Lake Cruises is near the ferry pier at Bowness-on-Windermere, whilst the boats are maintained on a slipway at Lakeside and a dry dock at Waterhead. The fleet of 17 passenger carrying vessels comprises four larger ships, usually referred to as steamers although all are now diesel/ diesel electric powered, and a number of smaller launches. There is also a large number of self drive hire boats. They operate a number of services, including:

Name	Route	Description
Yellow	Bowness-on-Windermere – Lakeside Station – Bowness-on-Windermere	All year service; most services operated by steamer
Red	Bowness-on-Windermere – Windermere Jetty - (Brockhole National Park Visitor Centre) – Ambleside – Bowness-on-Windermere	All year service; mixed steamer and launch service; only launches / Swift call at Brockhole. Only launches call at Windermere Jetty
Green	Ambleside – Brockhole National Park Visitor Centre – Wray Castle – Ambleside	Operates between March and October; launch service
Blue	Bowness-on-Windermere - 45 Minute Circular Tour of the Islands - Bowness-on-Windermere	All year service; operated by launch with 1 sailing per day with Swift (summer months only)
Bike Boat	Brockhole National Park Visitor Centre – Bark Barn at Claife – Brockhole National Park Visitors Centre	Operates between May and September; uses launch adapted to carry cycles
Ferry	Bowness-on-Windermere – Ferry House at Far Sawrey – Bowness-on-Windermere	Operates between March and October; launch service
Ferry	Lakeside Station – Fell Foot Park – Lakeside Station	Operates between March and September; launch service
Self Drive	Bowness-on-Windermere / Ambleside Waterhead	Operating a selection of self drive electric motor launches and rowing boats most of the year.

== Fleet ==
=== Steamers ===
Name	Built	Description	Image
Tern	1891	Steam Yacht (later Motor Vessel) Tern was built in 1891 by Forrest & Son of Wyvenhoe in Essex. She was originally built as a steam powered yacht, but was converted to diesel power in 1956. She is 145 feet (44 m) in length, 18 feet (5.5 m) in beam, a draft of 9 feet (2.7 m) and a gross tonnage of 120. She has two 6 cylinder Cummins diesel engines, two auxiliary generators and a bow thruster, and has a maximum speed of 10 knots (19 km/h; 12 mph). She carries a crew of 4 and up to 350 passengers, and is a member of the National Historic Fleet.	
Teal	1936	Motor Vessel Teal was built in 1936 by Vickers of Barrow-in-Furness, and transported in sections by rail to Lakeside for assembly. She is 142 feet (43 m) in length, 25 feet (7.6 m) in beam, a draft of 9 feet (2.7 m) and a gross tonnage of 251. Over the winter of 2020/21 Teal had two new Volvo Penta engines installed, replacing the two 6 cylinder Kelvin diesel engines she carried since 1994. Teal also has two auxiliary generators and a bow thruster. Teal has a maximum speed of 10 knots (19 km/h; 12 mph). She carries a crew of 6 (formerly 7) and up to 533 passengers, and is a member of the National Historic Fleet.	
Swan	1938	Motor Vessel Swan was built in 1938 by Vickers of Barrow-in-Furness, and transported in sections by rail to Lakeside for assembly. She is 142 feet (43 m) in length, 25 feet (7.6 m) in beam, a draft of 9 feet (2.7 m) and a gross tonnage of 251. She has two 6 cylinder Cummins diesel engines two auxiliary generators, a bow thruster and has a maximum speed of 10 knots (19 km/h; 12 mph). She carries a crew of 6 (formerly 7, changed in 2020) and up to 533 passengers, and is a member of the National Historic Fleet.	
Swift	2020	Diesel Electric Vessel Swift has three decks and at full capacity can hold 300 passengers. This ship was completed in 2020 by Damen Group. The sections of boat were transported by road to Lakeside and assembled in the car park next to the slipway, before being transported down to the pier side and craned in the water on 11 December 2019. The Swift is 34.4 metres long and uses 2 x Volvo Penta engines to power an electrical pod type propulsion system making it an extremely manoeuvrable vessel. It is crewed by a team of four. The ship is fully wheelchair accessible and had its first day in revenue earning service on 25 October 2020.	

=== Launches ===
Name	Built	Description	Image
Muriel II	1935	Muriel II was built in 1935 by Borwicks of Windermere in Cumbria. She is 45 feet (14 m) in length, 10 feet (3.0 m) in beam, a draft of 3.3 feet (1.0 m) and has a gross tonnage of 8. She has a maximum speed of 10 knots (19 km/h; 12 mph). She carries a crew of 2 and up to 57 passengers, and is registered by National Historic Ships.	
Sunflower II	1949	Sunflower II was built in 1949 by Borwicks of Windermere in Cumbria. She is 45 feet (14 m) in length, 9.2 feet (2.8 m) in beam, a draft of 5 feet (1.5 m) and has a gross tonnage of 8. She has a maximum speed of 10 knots (19 km/h; 12 mph). She carries a crew of 2 and up to 57 passengers, and is registered by National Historic Ships.	
Queen of the Lake	1949	Queen of the Lake was built in 1949 by Watercraft of Molesey in Surrey. She is 50 feet (15 m) in length and has a gross tonnage of 13. She has a maximum speed of 10 knots (19 km/h; 12 mph). She carries a crew of 2 and up to 84 passengers.	
Princess of the Lake	1950	Princess of the Lake was built in 1950 by Watercraft of Molesey in Surrey. She is 50 feet (15 m) in length and has a gross tonnage of 13. She has a maximum speed of 10 knots (19 km/h; 12 mph). She carries a crew of 2 and up to 84 passengers.	
Silverholme	1969	Silverholme was built in 1969. She is 53.1 feet (16.2 m) in length and has a gross tonnage of 35.6. She has a maximum speed of 10 knots (19 km/h; 12 mph). She carries a crew of 2 and up to 84 passengers.	
Miss Cumbria I-IV	1974-1988	The four vessels of the Miss Cumbria class were built in the Netherlands between 1974 and 1988. Each vessel is 65.9 feet (20.1 m) in length and has a gross tonnage of 42.3. They have a maximum speed of 10 knots (19 km/h; 12 mph). They carry a crew of 2 and up to 128 passengers. Image shows Miss Cumbria III.	
Miss Lakeland I	1985	Miss Lakeland I was built in the Netherlands in 1985. She is 67 feet (20 m) in length and has a gross tonnage of 46.6. She has a maximum speed of 10 knots (19 km/h; 12 mph). She carries a crew of 2 and up to 173 passengers.	
Miss Westmorland	1988	Miss Westmorland was built in Bristol in 1988. She is 60 feet (18 m) in length and has a maximum speed of 10 knots (19 km/h; 12 mph). She carries a crew of 2 and up to 128 passengers.	
Venture	1966	Venture was built on the shores of Windermere in 1966 by Youdell & Brockbank. She is 34.7 feet (10.6 m) in length and has a gross tonnage of 46.3. Originally powered by a single diesel engine, over the winter of 2017/18, Venture was converted to a zero carbon emissions electric propulsion unit. She has a maximum speed of 10 knots (19 km/h; 12 mph). She carries a crew of 2 and up to 45 passengers.	
Miss Lakeland II	1992	Miss Lakeland II was built in the Netherlands in 1992. She is 66.6 feet (20.3 m) in length and has a gross tonnage of 43.5. She has a maximum speed of 10 knots (19 km/h; 12 mph). She carries a crew of 2 and up to 156 passengers.	
