= St Peter's Church, Sawrey =

Church in Cumbria, England

Coordinates: 54.34809°N 2.95758°W

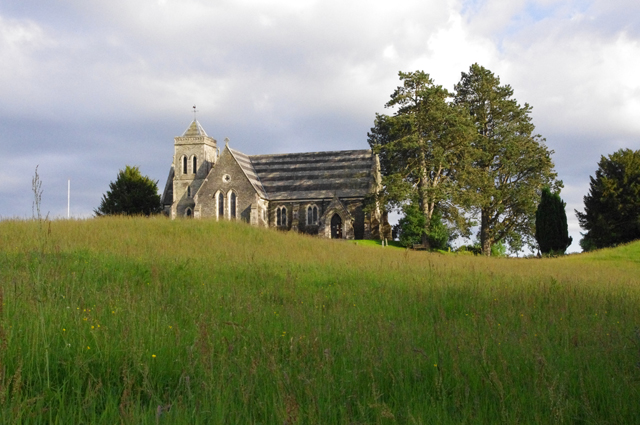
St Peter's Church, Far Sawrey

St Peter's Church is a parish church in Sawrey, Cumbria; it is located in Far Sawrey. It is dedicated to St Peter. The church is in the Archdeaconry of Westmorland and Furness, in the Diocese of Carlisle. The church is of 19th-century origin and is Grade II listed.

== History ==
The church was completed in 1869, to a design by a London-based architect, Robert Brass. It is the only church designed by Brass, who shortly afterwards ceased practice as an architect.

It is built from local slate and sandstone, in an Early English style with chancel, transepts and a three-stage tower at the north-east.

== Features ==
The stained-glass windows are by the following firms:

- East window by Cox & Son depicting Christ the Good Shepherd.
- Transept end windows by R.B. Edmundson & Son.
- West window in the north transept by Wailes and Strang.
- South wall of nave depicting St Miriam playing the timbrel and St Cecilia playing the organ.

The organ is by Gray & Davison, dating from 1875. In 2015 an undated chamber organ was on loan to the church and located in the north transept; it had arrived in the church from Cark Methodist Church after it closed in 2005.

There are two bells: one dating from 1883 by John Warner & Sons and the other from 1868 by Naylor, Vickers & Co. Only the Warner bell is in use.

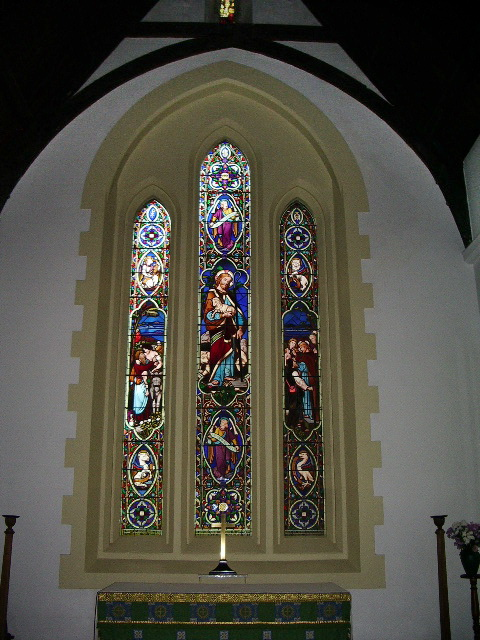
East Window by Cox & Son

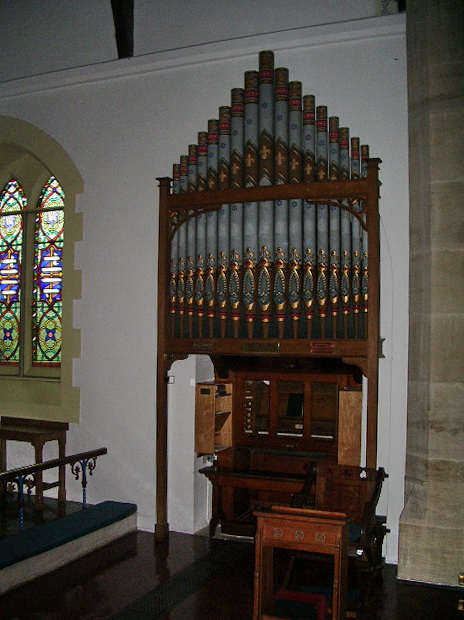
Pipework on the Gray & Davison organ

== Churchyard ==
There is one WWI war grave in the churchyard. Two further war graves (in France) are commemorated on gravestones in the churchyard.

Other burials include:

- Flt Lt Johnnie Johnson DFC, one of the Dambusters airmen.
- The Revd Alexander MacLeod Murray, chaplain to the Bela Camp for German and Italian POWs.

== Parish ==
The area of the parish was originally part of the parish of Hawkshead; it became a separate parish in 1873. In 1982 it became part of a united benefice with Hawkshead, and in turn in 2003 the parishes of Rusland and Satterthwaite joined the united benefice. There is a weekly service (2024).

== See also ==
- Listed buildings in Claife
