= Tabitha Twitchit's Bookshop =

Bookstore in Cumbria, England

Coordinates: 54.375169°N 2.998279°W

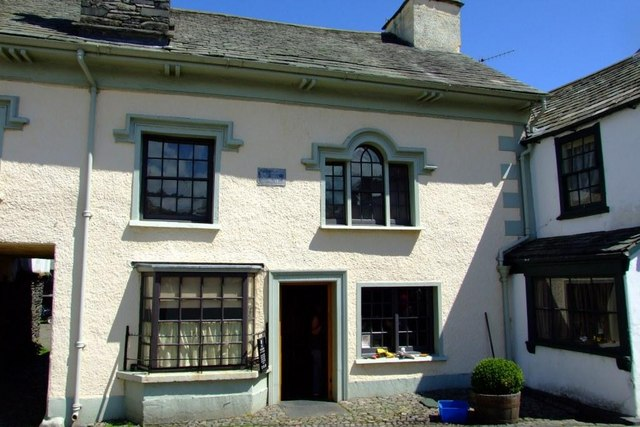
- The building during the time it housed the Beatrix Potter Gallery
- Interactive map of Tabitha Twitchit's Bookshop
- Location: Hawkshead, Cumbria, England
- Built: c. 17th century
- Governing body: National Trust

Listed Building – Grade II
- Official name: Former Solicitor's Office
- Designated: 25 March 1970
- Reference no.: 1335779

Tabitha Twitchit is a second-hand bookshop which opened in 2025 in a 17th-century stone building in Hawkshead, Cumbria, England. The bookshop is named after one of the feline characters of children's author Beatrix Potter. In the stories, Tabitha runs a business in Hawkshead.

== History ==
The building became a law office in the 19th century.

=== Connection with Beatrix Potter ===
It is believed that Beatrix Potter first met her husband, the solicitor William Heelis, in the building when it was his office.

==== Beatrix Potter Gallery ====
Between 1988 and 2022 the building housed the Beatrix Potter Gallery, an art gallery run by the National Trust, which owns original book illustrations by Potter. On display were original sketches and watercolours painted by Potter for her children's stories, as well as artifacts and information relating to her life and work. The art work has now been removed (although at 2026 the National Trust website still gives the impression that the gallery is open).

Since the closure of the gallery, items from the National Trust's collection of Potter art work have been shown in London and New York. There has also been discussion of where would be the best location for the permanent display of the collection. It has been possible to show a few works at Hill Top, but a larger location such as Wray Castle would be needed.

== Conservation ==
The building was grade II listed in 1970 as a former solicitor's office. During the period it served as an art gallery, the historic structure posed challenges as a location for the conservation and display of art works. There were problems, for example, with high humidity levels.

== See also ==
- Hawkshead and Claife (National Trust estate)
- Hawkshead Grammar School Museum
