= Hawkshead and Claife =

National Trust property in Cumbria, England

Coordinates: 54.3510°N 2.9423°W

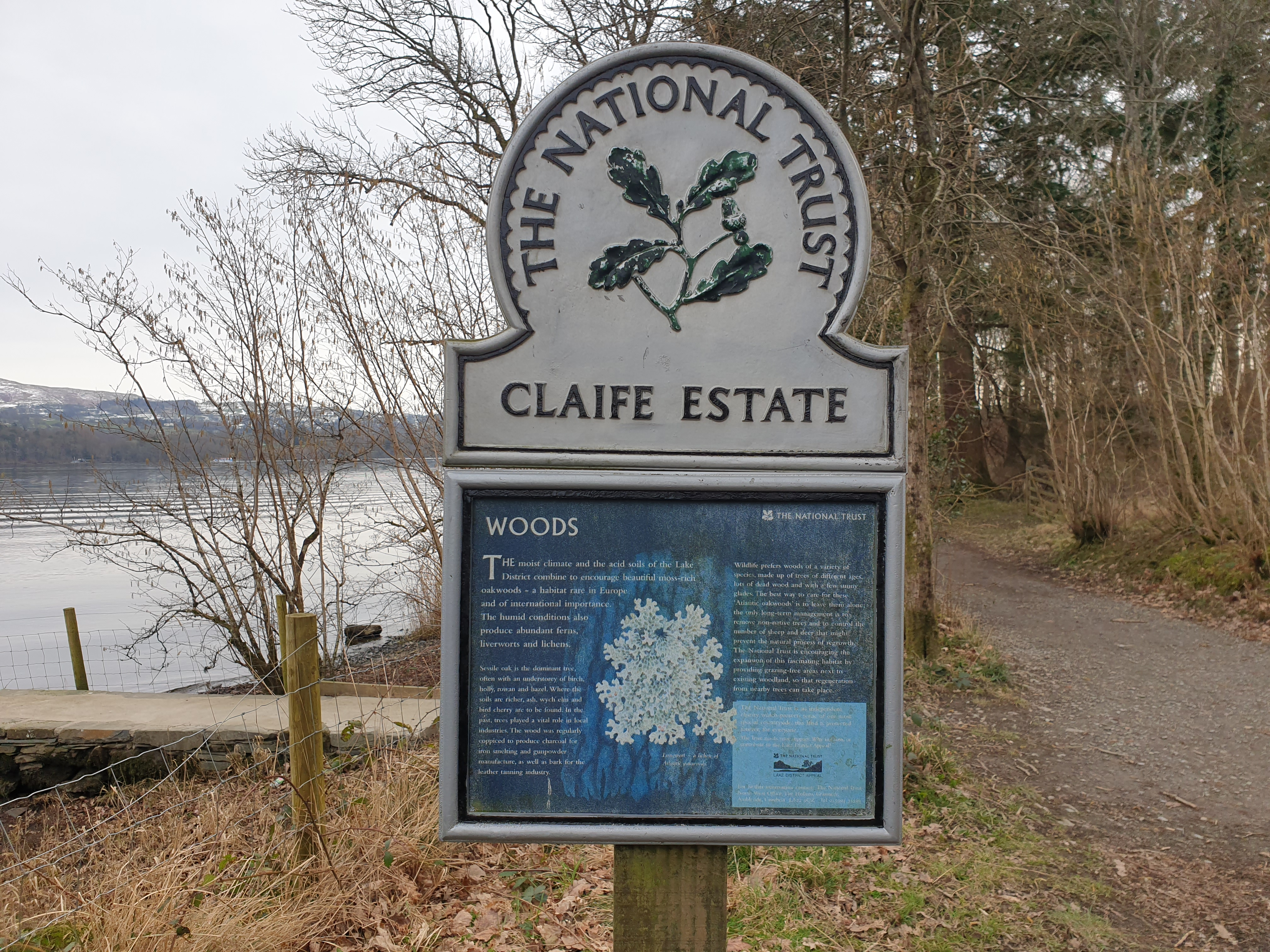
National Trust sign

Hawkshead and Claife is a National Trust property made up of much of the town of Hawkshead and surrounding Claife Woodlands in Cumbria, England. A notable viewpoint is Claife Viewing Station, a grade II listed ruin, overlooking Windermere. Each room was glazed in differing coloured glass to give the effect of viewing the landscape in the changing seasons.

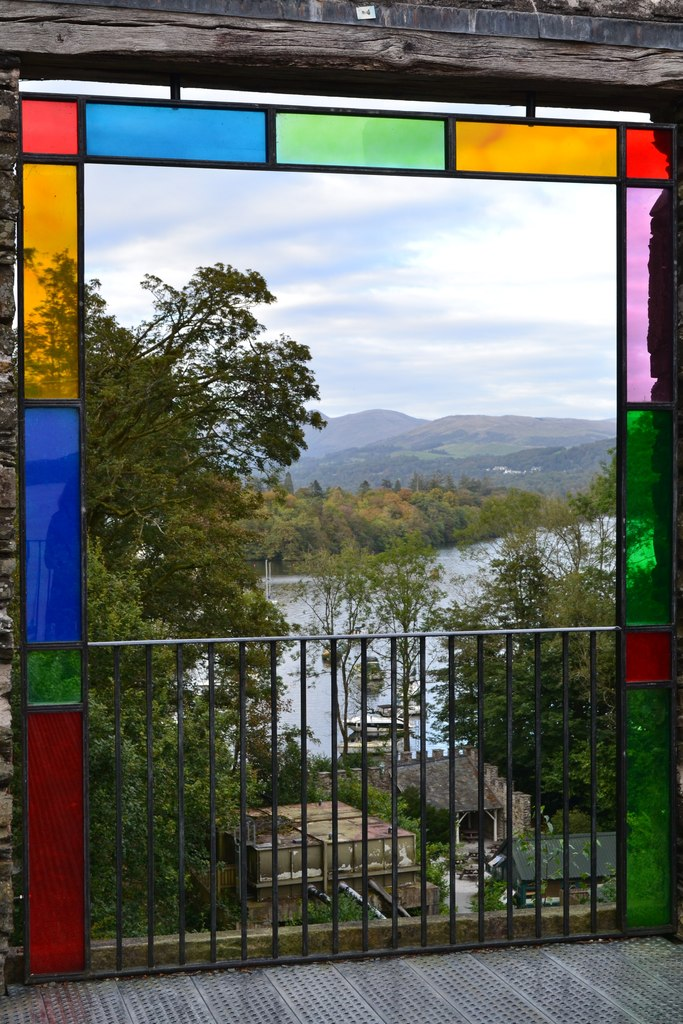
Claife Viewing Station

Individual properties in Hawkshead include Tabitha Twitchit's Bookshop, a listed building which formerly displayed works by Beatrix Potter as the Beatrix Potter Gallery. Since the closure of the gallery, the National Trust has been working to keep the art visible in other formats and locations. In 2022 the Victoria and Albert Museum and the National Trust – two of the world’s largest Beatrix Potter collections – came together to tell her life story in an exhibition ´Beatrix Potter: Drawn to Nature`, which opened in London.In 2024, the exhibition travelled to the Morgan Library & Museum in New York.

== Wray Castle ==
For walkers and cyclists there is four miles of access along the west shore of Windermere between Claife Viewing Station and Wray Castle. The Castle was given to the Trust with 64 acres (260,000 m^{2}) of land by Sir Noton and Lady Barclay. It has been suggested that, in the longer term, the Castle would be a suitable home for the Trust´s collection of original Beatrix Potter artwork.

== Public transport ==
The Windermere car ferry gives access to Claife from the more developed side of the lake. The Mountain Goat bus service runs a service for foot passengers between Ferry Point and Hawkshead. There is also a pedestrian ferry service to Wray Castle.
