= SY Tern =

Steam yacht on Windermere

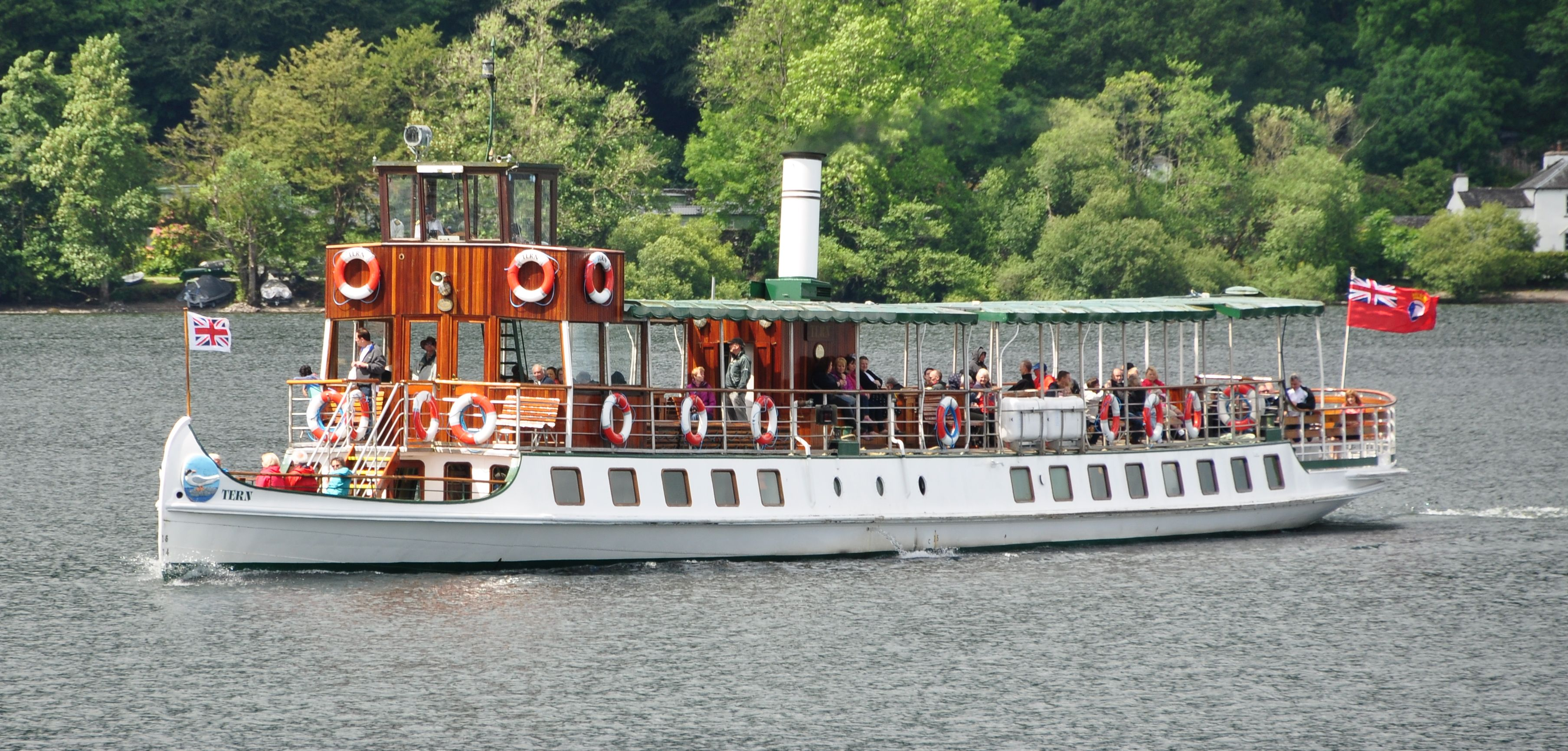

History

United Kingdom
- Name: Tern
- Owner: Furness Railway (1891–1923); London, Midland and Scottish Railway (1923–48); British Transport Commission (Sealink) (1948-84); Sea Containers Limited (Windermere Iron Steamboat Co.Ltd) (1984-1993); Bowness Bay Boating Company (Windermere Lake Cruises) (1993-present)
- Builder: Forrest & Son, Wyvenhoe, Essex
- Launched: 27 June 1891
- Status: Active in service

General characteristics
- Type: Motor yacht
- Tonnage: 120 GT
- Length: 145.7 feet (44.41 m)
- Beam: 18 feet (5.49 m)
- Depth: 9 feet (2.74 m)
- Installed power: As built; 2 x horizontal two Westray Copeland crank compression expansion engines; After refit; 2 x 6 cylinder Cummins diesel engines; 2 x auxiliary generators; Bow thruster
- Propulsion: Propeller
- Speed: 10 knots (12 mph; 19 km/h)
- Capacity: 350 passengers
- Crew: 4

SY Tern, now operating as MY Tern^{[a]}, is a passenger vessel on Windermere, England. Launched in 1891 she was built for the steamer service carrying passengers from the Furness Railway. She underwent several changes in owner as companies were merged throughout the twentieth century, and spent time as a sea cadet training ship during the Second World War. Refitted several times, her original steam engines have been replaced with diesel engines. Tern is the oldest vessel operating on Windermere, and is a member of the National Historic Fleet. She is currently operated by Windermere Lake Cruises as the flagship of their fleet.

== Construction and early years ==
Tern was ordered by Furness Railway from Forrest & Son, Wivenhoe, Essex. The vessel was delivered in sections by rail from Wivenhoe to Lakeside, Windermere and launched on 27 June 1891, becoming the largest ship on the lake. It was initially planned for her to be named Swallow, but her name was changed to Tern before her launch. As built she was 145 feet (44 m) in length, 18 feet (5.5 m) in beam, with a depth of 9 feet (2.7 m) and a gross tonnage of 120. Her original capacity was for up to 600 passengers. Tern was powered by two sets of horizontal two Westray Copeland crank compression expansion engines providing 200 bhp to a twin screw propeller. She carried two masts and had an open navigating platform set forward of her amidships single funnel. She was also designed with a distinctive canoe-shaped bow.

Tern has spent her whole active life operating on Windermere. She was caught in a severe storm while at Lakeside in November 1893 and sank at her moorings, but was refloated that night. In 1923 Furness Railway was absorbed into the London, Midland and Scottish Railway, as part of the measures of the Railways Act 1921, with Tern continuing to sail for her new owners. She was requisitioned for use as a sea cadet training ship during the Second World War and moored at Bowness-on-Windermere. The local communities of Ambleside and Bowness had adopted the U-class submarine HMS Undine, built by Vickers-Armstrongs at nearby Barrow-in-Furness. Tern was temporarily renamed Undine in honour of the submarine. Tern continued in service after the war. The Transport Act 1947 ordered the nationalisation of the railways, and in 1948 her owners, the London, Midland and Scottish Railway, was absorbed into British Railways. Tern was taken over by the British Transport Commission, later becoming part of their Sealink operations.

Tern underwent a substantial refit in winter 1957/58, having her steam engines replaced with two six-cylinder 120-bhp Gleniffer diesel engines. She was fitted with a short raked funnel, replacing her original tall one, and an enclosed wheelhouse was at some point built over the open navigating platform. In 1973 she was involved in a near-miss with a vessel involved in the filming of Swallows and Amazons, an adaptation of Arthur Ransome's book set in the Lake District. The crew of the Swallow almost collided with Tern, necessitating an ad lib change in the script. In 1984 Sealink was sold off to Sea Containers Limited, who continued to operate the Windermere vessels as 'The Windermere Iron Steamboat Company'.

Tern underwent another refit in winter 1990/91 which substantially restored her original appearance. Her short funnel was replaced with a tall thin one, an awning covered most of her upper deck, with an enclosed wooden wheelhouse at the forward end. Sea Containers sold off their Windermere operations in 1993 to a local company, Bowness Bay Boating Company, who merged the vessels into their operations as Windermere Lake Cruises. In 1996 she appeared in an episode of Agatha Christie's Poirot. A further refit in 1998 replaced Tern's Gleniffer diesel engines with Cummins diesel engines.

== Tern today ==
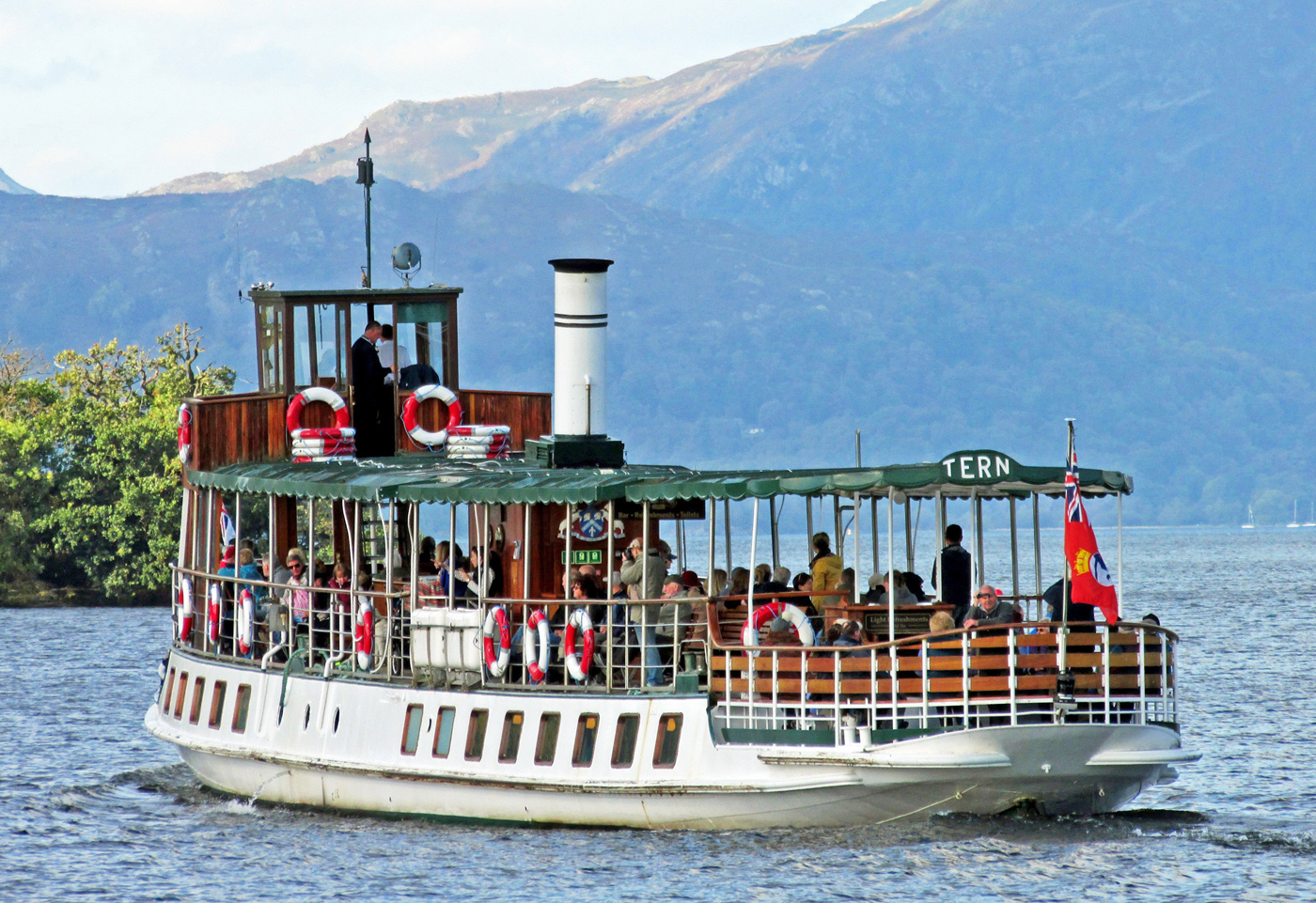
Stern view of Tern as she leaves Bowness Pier

Tern is the oldest steamboat operating on Windermere, and is the flagship of Windermere Lake Cruises.^{[b]} She is registered by National Historic Ships with certificate number 380, and is part of the National Historic Fleet. Ships of the National Historic Fleet are described as "being of pre-eminent national or regional significance" and as "meriting a higher priority for long term preservation". In 2012 she carried the Olympic Torch from Waterhead Pier to Bowness-on-Windermere during the torch's journey across the British Isles ahead of the 2012 Summer Olympics. Tern underwent a further refit in winter 2014 which included the repair and replacement of the hull plates.

Tern celebrated her 125th birthday in June 2016 with special sailings and events, and the launch of a children's book entitled Busy Little Tern's Special Day. It was estimated that by this time she had sailed over a million miles and carried some 17 million passengers. Tern continues to make two and a half sailings daily between Easter and November, carrying up to 350 passengers. Passenger facilities include a licensed bar serving refreshments, a centrally heated saloon, and toilets. The vessel herself is wheelchair accessible, though her facilities are not.

== Notes ==
a. SY is a ship prefix standing for steam yacht. When Tern's steam engines were replaced by diesel motors in 1956, the MY prefix, motor yacht, became appropriate. The prefix MV, motor vessel, is also used.

b. The steam launches Dolly and Esperance, and the steam barge Raven, all in the collections of Windermere Jetty: Museum of Boats, Steam and Stories, are older, but have been out of service as museum exhibits for many years.
