= Graythwaite Hall =

Coordinates: 54.314°N 2.968°W

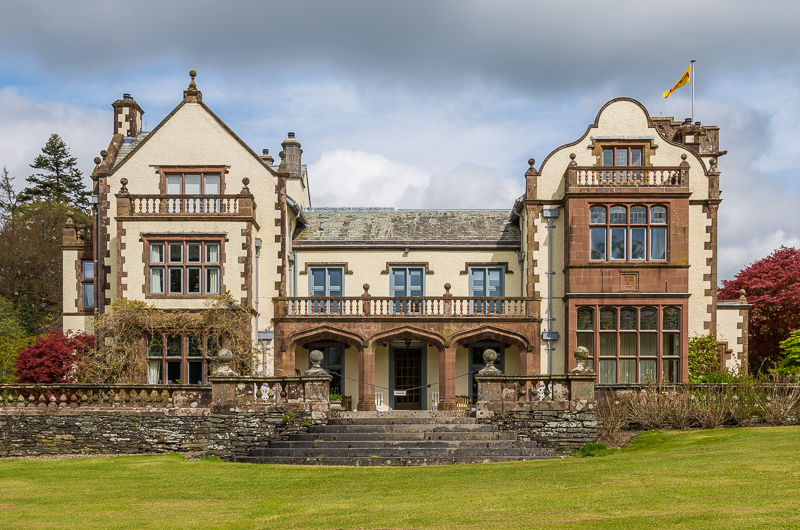
- The garden elevation of Graythwaite Hall. It is contemporary with Mawson's redesign of the gardens.
- Interactive map of the Graythwaite Hall area

General information
- Location: Ulverston, England

Listed Building – Grade II
- Designated: 1970
- Reference no.: 1335765
- Client: Sandys family

Graythwaite Hall, near Ulverston, Cumbria in the Lake District of England is the home of the Sandys family.

One of the more famous members of the family was Edwin Sandys, who was Archbishop of York (1576–88) and was founder of Hawkshead Grammar School which William Wordsworth attended. The hall dates from the 17th century and extension work was carried out in the 18th century. In the 19th century some major refacing gave the hall a Gothic Revival or Tudor Revival appearance.

== Grounds ==
The house is surrounded by 7 acres (28,000 m^{2}) of gardens laid out by Thomas Hayton Mawson from 1886 for Colonel Thomas Sandys. The importance of the commission in Mawson's development as a landscape architect has been discussed by garden historians, and was acknowledged by Mawson himself in his book The Art and Craft of Garden Making (1900).

The gardens are set in a wooded valley. An arboretum contains some fine trees. The woods surrounding the estate were a favourite walking spot for William Wordsworth, and were the backdrop for Beatrix Potter's story 'The Fairy Caravan' .

The ornamental iron gates at the entrance to the formal gardens were designed by Dan Gibson, a local architect. Gibson went on to collaborate with Mawson on other projects such as Brockhole and Hanley Park.

== Conservation and access ==
The Hall is one of a number of listed buildings in the area (see Listed buildings in Satterthwaite). It was listed Grade II in 1970. Graythwaite is designated Grade II* in the Register of Historic Parks and Gardens of Special Historic Interest in England. The grounds were listed in 2020.

The gardens within the grounds are open to the public from early April until mid August, However, the hall is closed to the public. The gardens are probably best viewed in late spring when the rhododendrons and azaleas are in bloom. However, the Dutch garden and the former rose garden (Mawson's design for the latter has been altered) add interest in other seasons.

== Cited sources ==
Books

- Mawson, Thomas (1900). The Art and Craft of Garden Making. Batsford.
- Rutherford, Sarah (2013). The Arts and Crafts Garden. Shire Publications.

Online sources

- "Graythwaite Hall (Historic England: Shipwreck and Selfridges on 2020 protected list)". BBC. December 2020.
- "National Park Visitor Centre at Brockhole". 2005.
