= RMS Wray Castle =

Former Merchant Navy radio college

Coordinates: 54°24′01″N 02°57′51″W

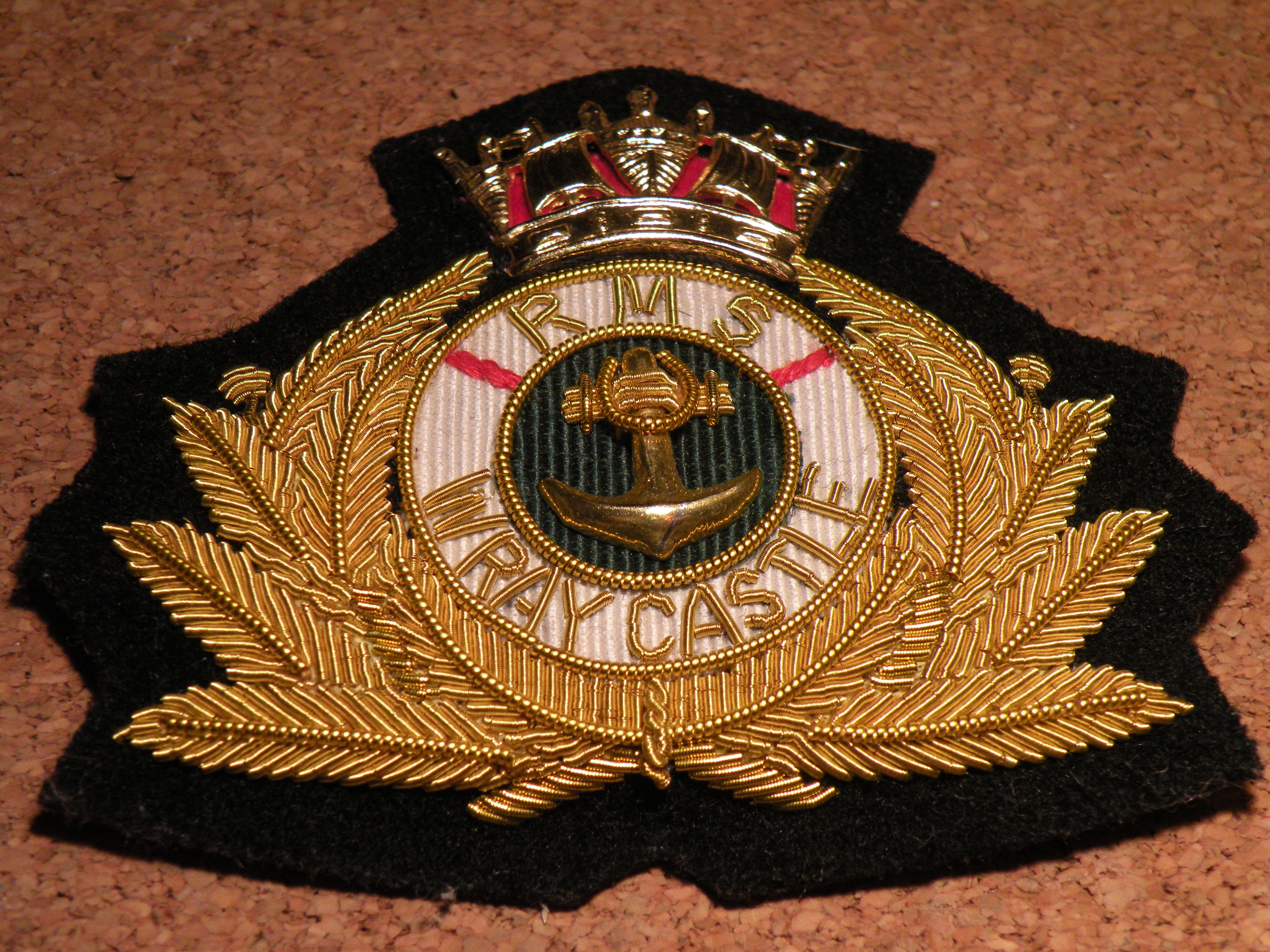
The Badge of "RMS Wray Castle"

RMS Wray Castle was a training college for Merchant Navy radio officers based at Wray Castle in the Lake District, from 1958 to 1998.

At 11:40 p.m., on 14 April 1912 the RMS Titanic hit an iceberg. The collision opened five of her watertight compartments to the sea; the ship gradually filled with water and by 2:20 a.m., she broke apart and foundered, with well over one thousand people still aboard. Two hours after Titanic foundered, the Cunard liner RMS Carpathia arrived and took aboard an estimated 705 survivors.

There was worldwide shock at the huge loss of life and the procedural errors that had led to it. Public inquiries in Britain and the United States led to major improvements in maritime safety. One of their most important legacies was the establishment in 1914 of the International Convention for the Safety of Life at Sea (SOLAS), which still governs maritime safety today. Additionally, several new wireless regulations were passed around the world in an effort to learn from the many missteps in wireless communications—which could have saved many more passengers. Primary to these improved regulations were the installation of radio equipment on ALL ships, fixed Distress frequencies and 24-hour watch on those frequencies.

During the forty years that the college was in operation students studied the SOLAS Radio Procedures & Regulations, MRGC (Maritime Radiocommunications General Certificate including Morse Code), SCOTVEC (Maintenance of Radar Equipment), and the maintenance and repair of Maritime Radio and Radar equipment.
