= Listed buildings in Satterthwaite =

Satterthwaite is a civil parish in Westmorland and Furness, Cumbria, England. It contains eight listed buildings that are recorded in the National Heritage List for England. Of these, one is listed at Grade II*, the middle of the three grades, and the others are at Grade II, the lowest grade. The parish is in the Lake District National Park. It contains the village of Satterthwaite, and is otherwise entirely rural. The listed buildings consist of houses and associated structures, and two former mills.

== Key ==
Grade	Criteria
II*	Particularly important buildings of more than special interest
II	Buildings of national importance and special interest

== Buildings ==
Name and location	Photograph	Date	Notes	Grade
Graythwaite Old Hall; 54.30974°N 2.96670°W		16th or early 17th century	The east wing was added to the hall in about 1710. The hall is in roughcast stone with a bracketed cornice and a slate roof. The east front has three storeys and six bays, and the gabled rear wing has two storeys and three bays. Most of the windows are sashes, some are blocked, there are also inserted round windows, a Venetian window, and in the rear wing are mullioned windows. The doorway has pilasters and a pediment containing a cartouche.	II*
Graythwaite Hall; 54.31311°N 2.96888°W		16th or 17th century	A country house that has been altered and extended on a number of occasions. It is in roughcast stone with sandstone dressings, quoins, and has slate roofs with coped gables. The south front has a central block of two storeys and three bays, flanked by three-storey gabled wings. The left gable has three ball finials, and the right gable is shaped with two ball finials. In the centre is a verandah with a hood mould and a balustrade with ball finials and a cornice. In the outer bays are two-storey bay windows with mullioned and transomed windows.	II
Laburnum Cottage; 54.32322°N 3.01864°W	—	Late 17th or 18th century	A roughcast house with a slate roof and two storeys. The east front has five bays, the end two bays recessed and higher, and at the rear is a two-storey gabled wing. The windows are of various types. Inside are two upper cruck trusses.	II
Low Bowkerstead and barn 54.31326°N 3.02074°W		Late 17th or 18th century	The house and barn are in stone with slate roofs. The house is roughcast, and has two storeys and three bays, the right bay gabled. On the front is a gabled porch, and the windows are fixed with opening lights. The barn to the right has a small entrance and blocked entrance in the front. At the rear is a gabled bay with an outshut.	II
Cunsey Mill; 54.33485°N 2.95139°W		18th century	Originally a bobbin mill, later a saw mill, it is in slate stone with a slate roof. It consists of two gabled ranges with an open shed to the northeast, and a gabled coppice barn at the rear. The windows are either blocked or have fixed glazing, and there are round windows in the gables. Machinery has been retained inside the mill.	II
Silverholme; 54.30982°N 2.96235°W	—	c. 1800	A country house in stone with a slate roof. It has two storeys and ten bays, the right five bays being recessed and higher with a sill band, a modillioned cornice, and a hipped roof. There are two entrances, one plain, the other with panelled pilasters, an entablature with a frieze containing wreathes, and a door with a fanlight. The windows are sashes.	II
Old Bobbin Mill; 54.30537°N 3.02384°W	—	18th or early 19th century	Originally a bobbin mill, later a private house, it is in stone and is mainly roughcast. There are eleven bays, the two bays to the west have one storey and are higher, the other bays have two storeys. Most of the windows are casements, some are fixed, and there are two entrances.	II
Old Vicarage; 54.32212°N 3.01822°W	—	Early 19th century	A stone house with a band, a slate roof, two storeys and three bays. In the centre is a trellis porch with a cornice and a door with a fanlight. The windows are sashes with an inserted window to the right of the doorway.	II
