= Near and Far Sawrey =

Coordinates: 54.353°N 2.972°W

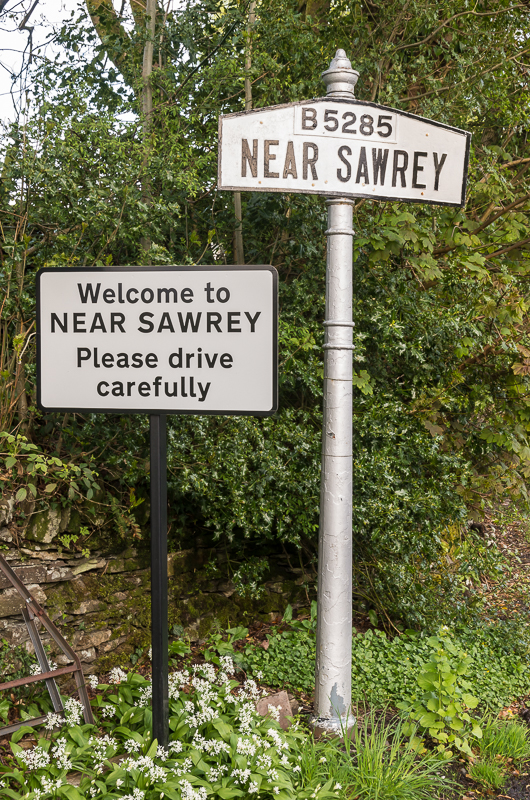
- Near Sawrey

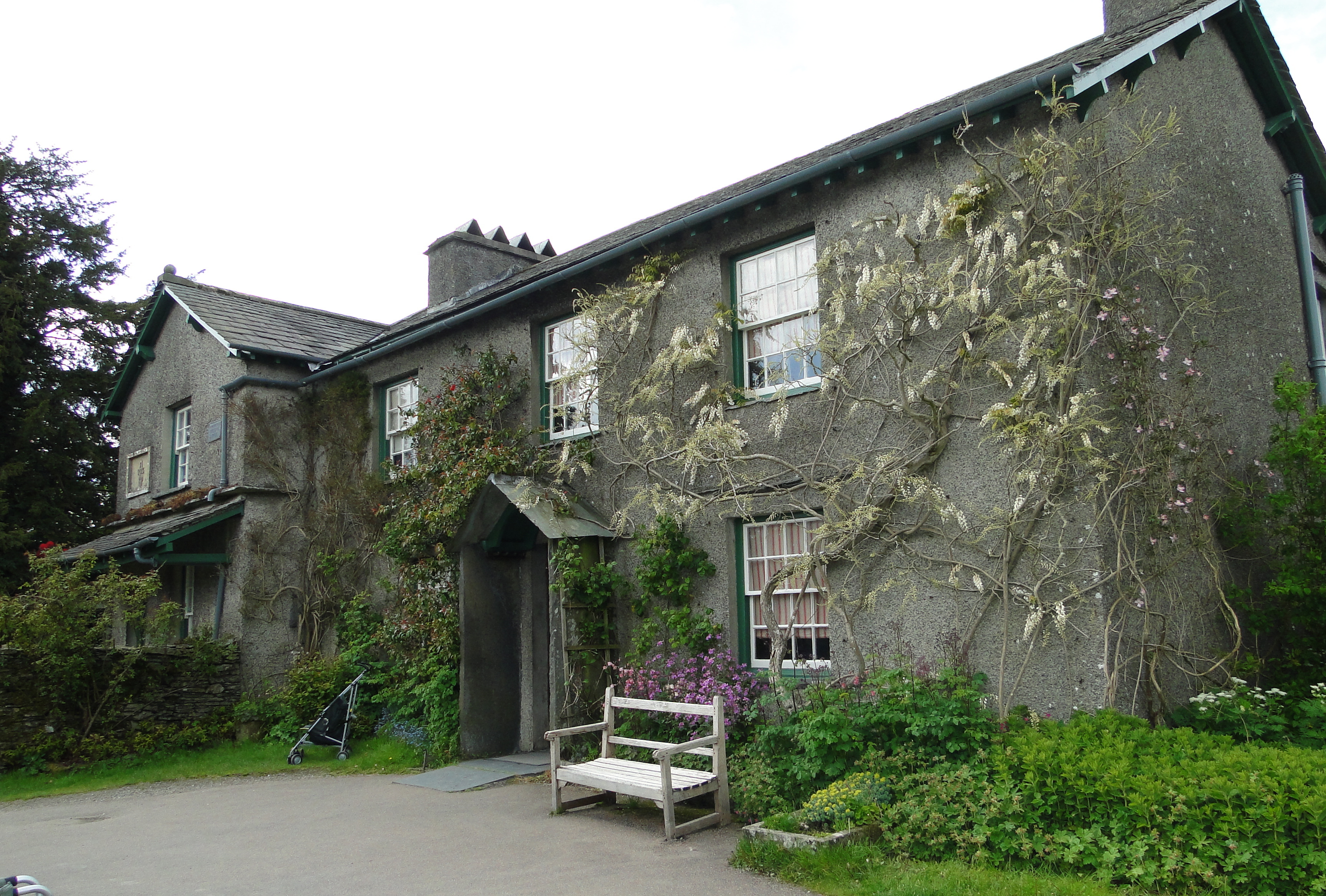
- Beatrix Potter’s house - ‘Hill Top’

- Location within Cumbria
- OS grid reference: SD368957
- Civil parish: Claife
- Unitary authority: Westmorland and Furness
- Ceremonial county: Cumbria
- Region: North West
- Country: England
- Sovereign state: United Kingdom
- Post town: AMBLESIDE
- Postcode district: LA22
- Dialling code: 015394
- Police: Cumbria
- Fire: Cumbria
- Ambulance: North West
- UK Parliament: Westmorland and Lonsdale

Near Sawrey and Far Sawrey are two neighbouring villages in the Furness area of Cumbria, England. Within the boundaries of the historic county of Lancashire, both are located in the Lake District between the village of Hawkshead and the lake of Windermere. The two lie on the B5285, which runs from Hawkshead to the west bank of the Windermere Ferry, a car ferry across Windermere 1 mile (1.6 kilometres) to the east of the villages.

The two are famous for their association with Beatrix Potter. She lived at Hill Top Farm in Near Sawrey, first arriving at age 30 in 1896. A number of sites in the villages were used in her books such as The Tale of Tom Kitten, The Fairy Caravan, The Pie and the Patty Pan and The Tale of Jemima Puddle-Duck.

The villages date from at least the 14th century, when Near Sawrey was known as 'Sourer', becoming 'Narr Sawrey' by the 17th century (suggesting that Far Sawrey must have been in existence by that time). Near Sawrey contains a pub, while Far Sawrey has the parish church, a hotel and pub. The village shop ceased to function as a post office around 2003 and ceased to be a shop around 2010.

There are waymarked paths between the ferry and Beatrix Potter's house, which mostly allows people to avoid walking on the public roads.

== Governance ==
Sawrey is part of the Westmorland and Lonsdale parliamentary constituency, of which Tim Farron is the current member of parliament, representing the Liberal Democrats.

For local government purposes it is in the Coniston and Hawkshead Ward of Westmorland and Furness Council.

The villages are also represented on Claife Parish Council. Situated between Lake Windermere and Esthwaite Water, the Parish of Claife includes the villages of Colthouse and High Wray (upper Claife), Cunsey, Far Sawrey and Near Sawrey (lower Claife).

== Stan Laurel connection ==
Hollywood film comedian Stan Laurel was a frequent visitor to Sawrey as a child. Born in Ulverston as Arthur Stanley Jefferson in 1890, he would take trips to the village to visit his uncle and aunt John and Nant Shaw, who managed Sawrey's grocery shop. They had previously managed Flookburgh's co-operative shop, where Laurel also visited. In 1955, the world-famous comedian wrote to the granddaughter of the Shaws:

"Your visit to the Lake District brought back to me many happy memories of my holidays there with your grandparents. I can see the old grocery shop and the apple orchard opposite very vividly when your mother, Jack, Charlie, Nellie and poor Elsie were all kids together and full of mischief."

== See also ==
- Listed buildings in Claife
