= Wray Castle =

Castle in Cumbria, England

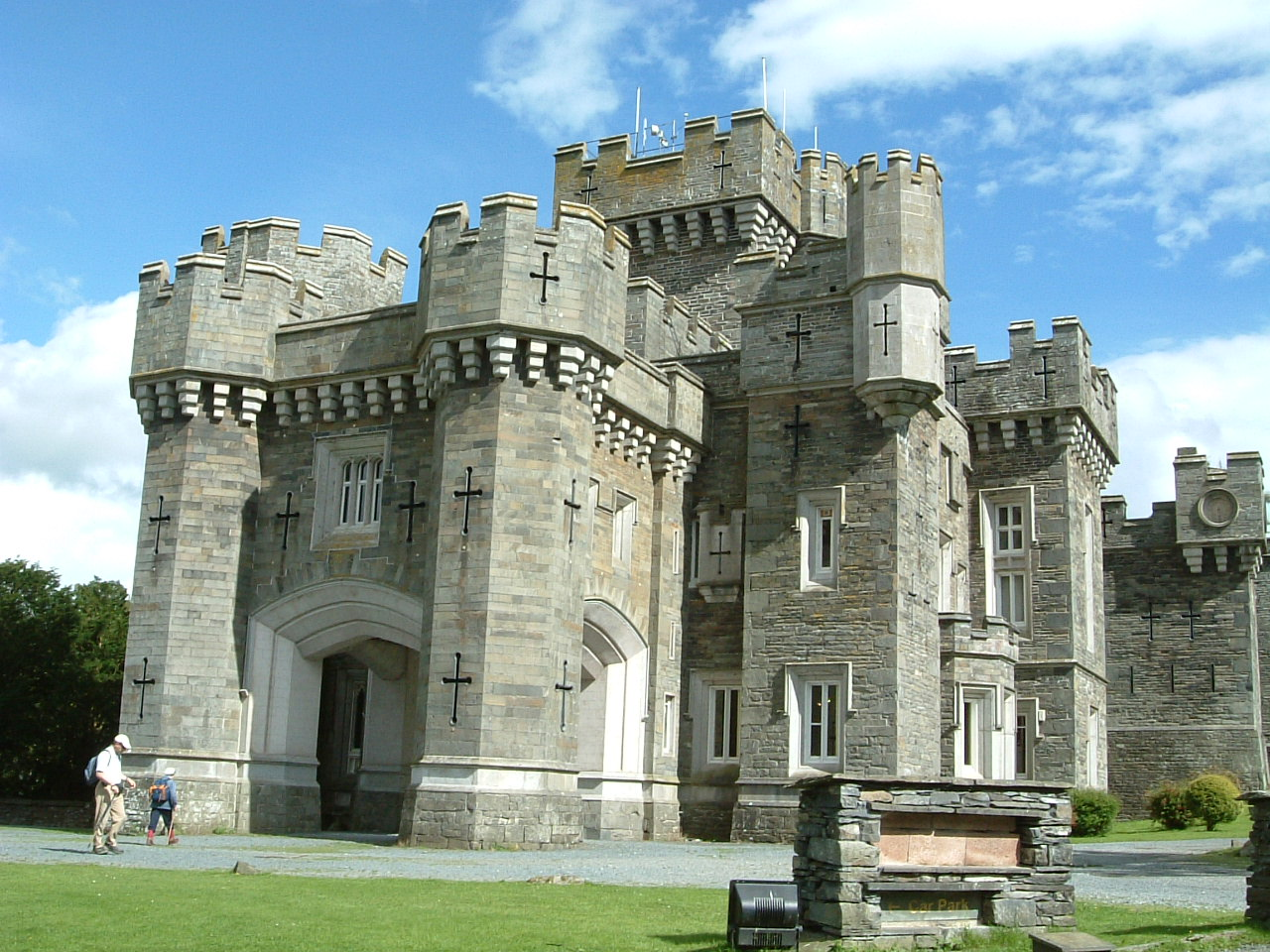
- Wray Castle: its gothic features include fake arrowslits
- Established: 2011
- Location: Claife, Westmorland and Furness, Cumbria
- Coordinates: 54°24′02″N 2°57′51″W
- Owner: National Trust
- Public transit access: See website
- Website: www.nationaltrust.org.uk/wray-castle

Listed Building – Grade II*
- Official name: R.M.S. Wray Castle
- Designated: 25 March 1970
- Reference no.: 1106324

Listed Building – Grade II
- Listings: 5 including Retaining Walls and Boathouse

Wray Castle is a Victorian neo-gothic building at Claife in Cumbria within the boundaries of the historic county of Lancashire. The house and grounds have belonged to the National Trust since 1929. The Castle was open to the public for a dozen years prior to 2024. The Castle is now closed for refurbishment. It is envisaged that it will be ready for partial reopening in 2027.

The grounds, which include part of the shoreline of Windermere, are open all year round. While the castle and its ancillary buildings are protected under the National Heritage List for England, the grounds are not registered as a historic park or garden. The estate lies within the Lake District National Park, itself a UNESCO World Heritage Site, which provides landscape‑level recognition.

== Trees ==
The grounds are renowned for their selection of specimen trees. The planting of conifers (including Wellingtonia) reflects the thinking of the Picturesque movement. There are also examples of Ginkgo biloba, weeping lime and varieties of beech. In 2026 a sapling grown from the felled Sycamore Gap tree was stolen from the castle's grounds.

== History of the Castle ==
The house was built in 1840 for a retired Liverpudlian surgeon, James Dawson, who built it along with the neighbouring Wray Church using his wife's fortune. After Dawson's death in 1875, the estate was inherited by his fifteen-year-old nephew, Edward Preston Rawnsley. In 1877 Edward's cousin, Hardwicke Rawnsley, took up the appointment of vicar of Wray Church. To protect the countryside from damaging development, Hardwicke Rawnsley, building on an idea propounded by John Ruskin, conceived of a National Trust that could buy and preserve places of natural beauty and historic interest for the nation.

=== Connection with Beatrix Potter ===
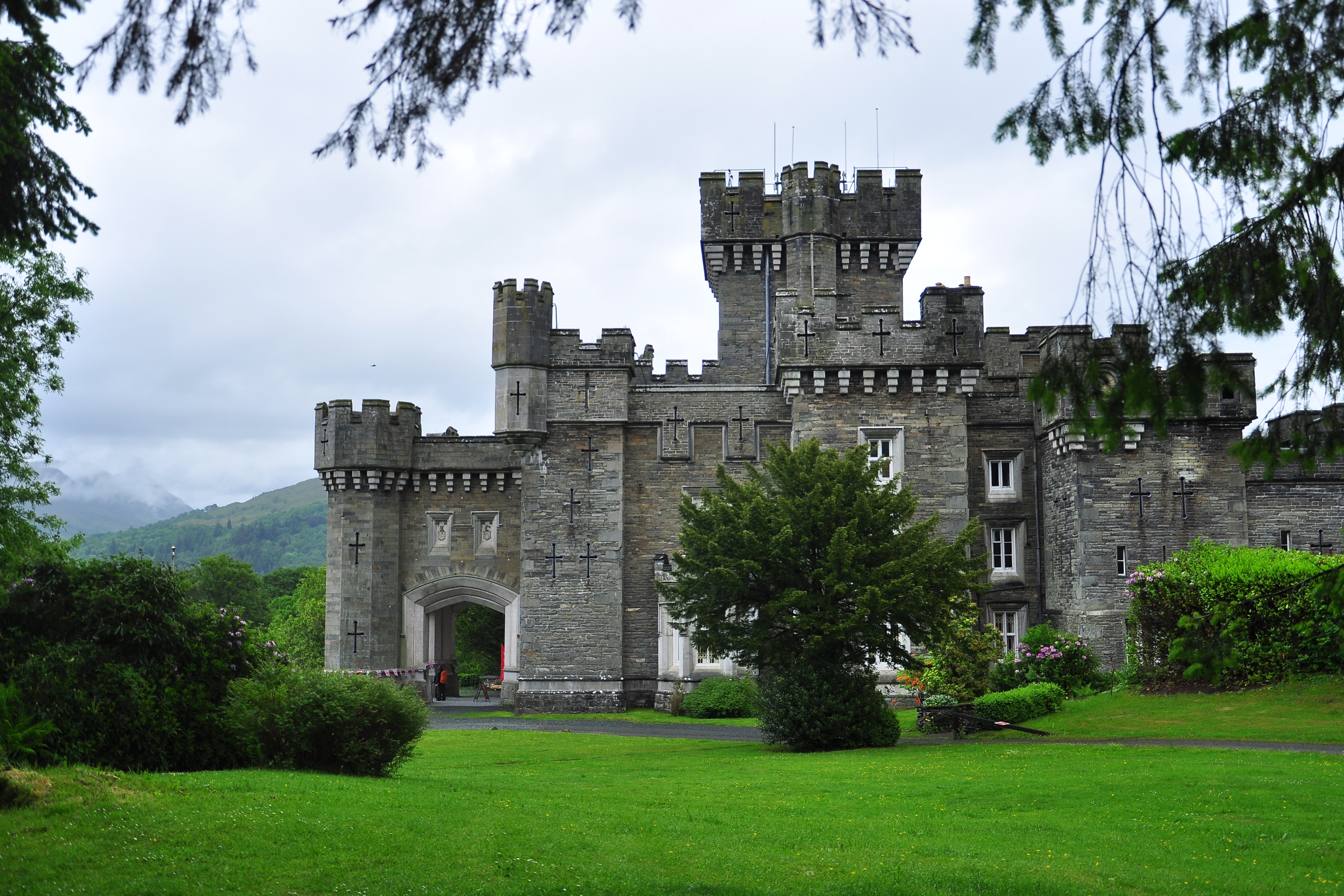
Beatrix Potter aged 16 stayed here in 1882 on a family holiday, beginning her long association with the Lake District.

The house has an association with another key player in the National Trust, Beatrix Potter, who spent a summer holiday there when she was 16 in 1882. She bought a small farm in the Claife area, Hill Top, in 1905 with royalties from her first book, The Tale of Peter Rabbit. She went on to buy considerable tracts of land nearby, though she never owned the castle itself. When Potter died in 1943, she left 4,000 acres of land and fourteen farms to the care of the National Trust.

=== Later occupants ===
In 1929 Wray Castle and 64 acres (260,000 m^{2}) of land were given to the National Trust by Sir Noton and Lady Barclay, the owners at that time.

The castle has been subject to a variety of uses since it was acquired by the National Trust, including a brief period as a youth hostel in 1929. For twenty years from 1931 the castle housed the offices of the Freshwater Biological Association.

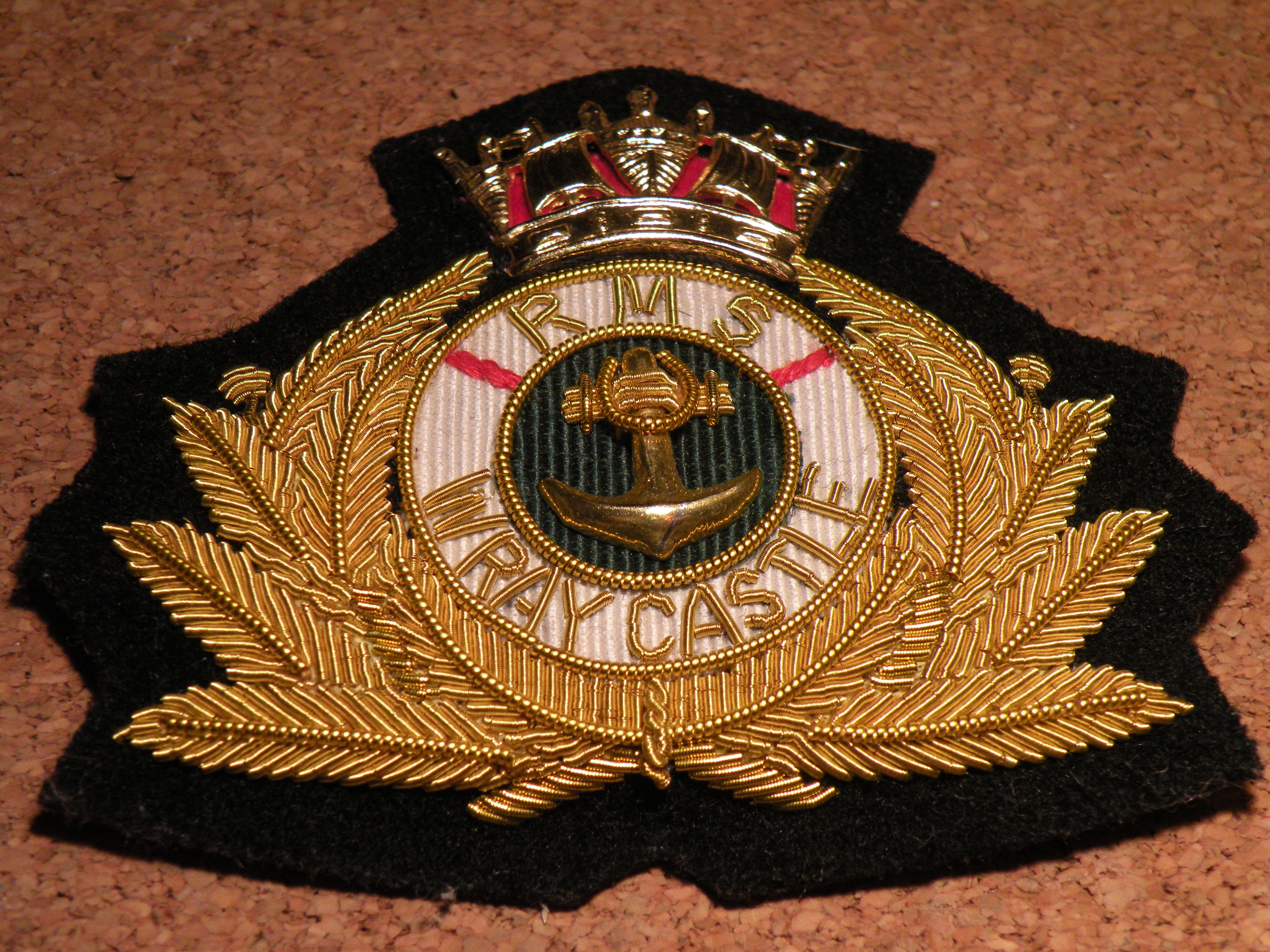
The Badge of "RMS Wray Castle" (as worn by some cadets during Merchant Navy College days)

From 1958 to 1998 it became a training college for Merchant Navy radio officers (RMS Wray Castle), with up to 150 cadets living in the castle while studying the procedures and regulations regarding the use of radio for the "Safety of Life at Sea".

The Global Maritime Distress and Safety System, or GMDSS, was introduced in 1988 and all ships had to be fitted by 1999, thus bringing to an end the position of radio officer. In 1995 the last 'Radio Officer' left, and the college diversified into ROV and general telecoms training, continuing to use the name Wray Castle Limited. Wray Castle Limited continues to issue GMDSS licenses as part of its role operating the national administration centre on behalf of AMERC (Association of Marine Electronic and Radio Colleges), relocating away from the Castle in 2004.

=== Marine legacy ===
Two ships were named after Wray Castle, both built for the Lancashire Shipping Company (also known as The Castle Line) of James Chalmers & Co. The first was one of five large sailing vessels built at the Williamson shipyard at Workington, the others being Greystoke Castle, Lancaster Castle, Lowther Castle and Pendragon Castle. The Wray Castle was the fourth to be built, a steel ocean-going three-masted ship of 1,937 gross registered tonnage (GRT), launched in March 1889. The ship had a long career, surviving a serious fire in its hold in 1906 and was eventually wrecked on the islands off Coronel, Chile, in 1924. The second Wray Castle was a steamship of 4,253 GRT built by William Hamilton of Glasgow in 1938. She was torpedoed and sunk off Freetown, West Africa, on May 3 1941.

== Access ==
In 2011 the National Trust proposed to lease the property, which had been denuded of its furnishings, for use as a hotel. However, they decided to open it to the public during the visitor season that year. High visitor numbers meant that the property, which in its empty state was particularly child-friendly, had clear potential to be developed as a visitor attraction. In 2014 the Trust applied for retrospective planning permission to change the use of the listed building to a visitor attraction.

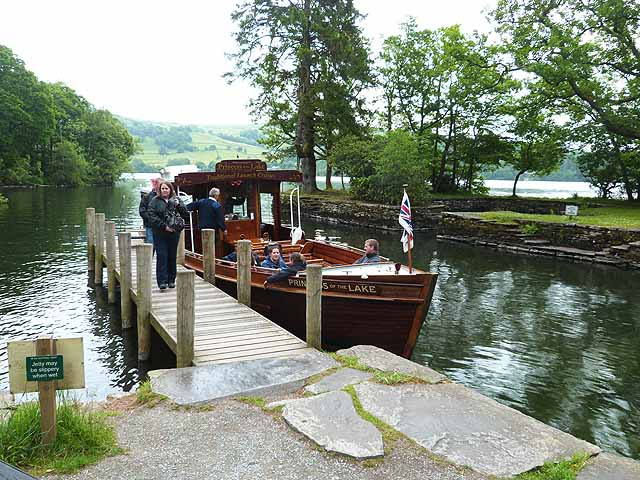

Between March and October, Windermere Lake Cruises operates a passenger boat service on Windermere from Ambleside and the Brockhole National Park Visitor Centre to Wray Castle.

== Related buildings ==
About a decade after the construction of the castle, the Dawsons built the church of Saint Margaret to serve the spiritual needs of the family and its employees. The architecture of the church has a Gothic Revival aesthetic, and the church tower is similar to the castle.

The church is normally closed, but it is occasionally opened for Heritage Open Days.

== See also ==
- Grade II* listed buildings in Westmorland and Furness
- Listed buildings in Claife
- Hawkshead and Claife
