= Windermere Ferry =

Cable Ferry in Cumbria

Coordinates: 54.353355°N 2.934551°W

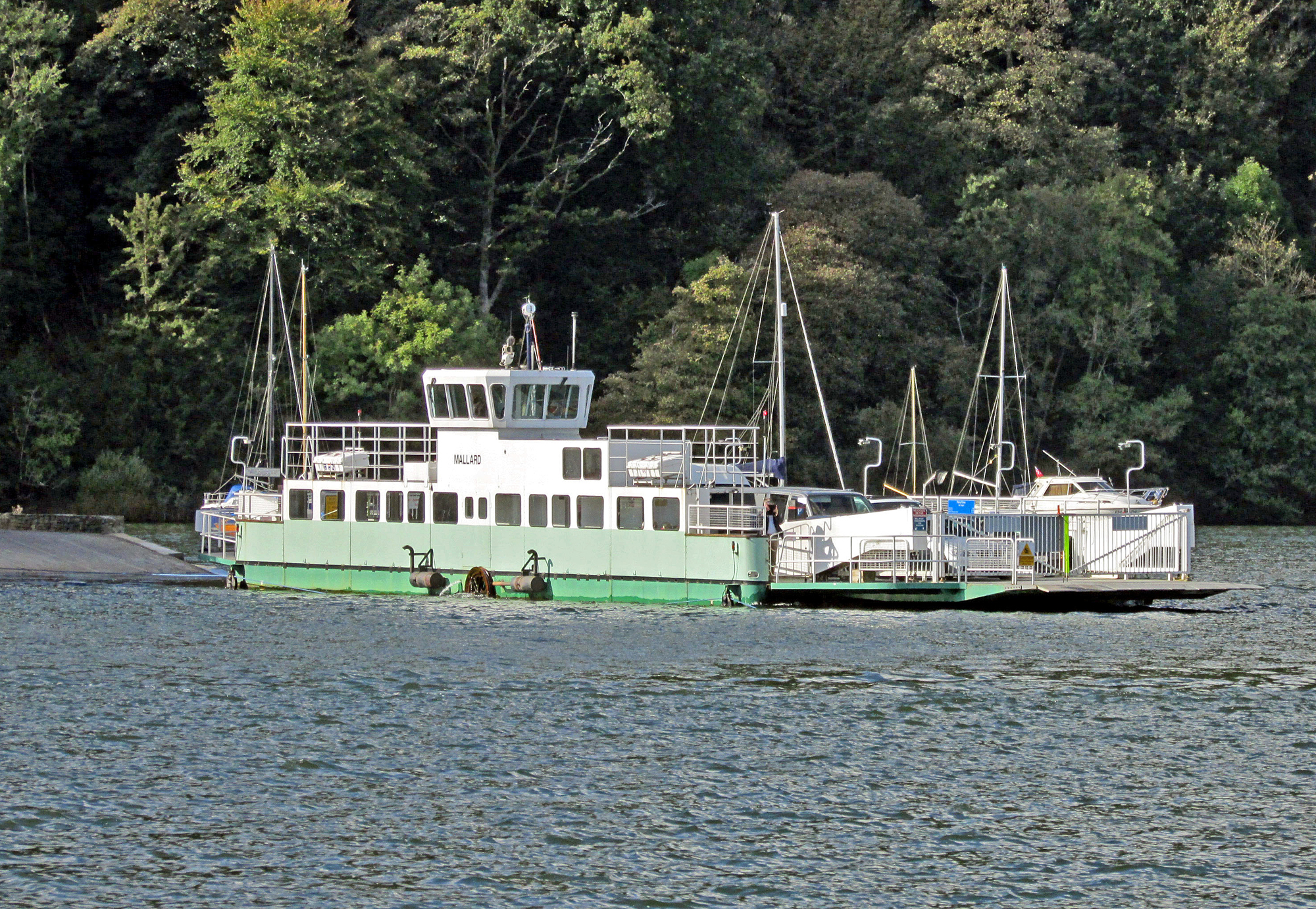
- The ferry Mallard setting out from the ramp at Far Sawrey for the east shore at Bowness in October 2016
- Transit type: Cable ferry
- Carries: up to 18 cars (depending on size) / 100 passengers
- Operator: Westmorland and Furness Council
- Frequency: Every 20 minutes

The Windermere Ferry is a vehicular cable ferry which crosses Windermere, the largest lake in England and located within English county of Cumbria. The ferry route forms part of the B5285 road and crosses the lake at about its midpoint, from Ferry Nab in Bowness-on-Windermere to Ferry House at Far Sawrey, a distance of some 490 metres (540 yd). The ferry is owned and operated by Westmorland and Furness Council.

The ferry operates all year, with services every 20 minutes from early morning to mid-evening. Each crossing can carry up to 18 cars and over 100 passengers and takes less than 10 minutes. A toll is charged. If the ferry is not operating, the alternative is a road journey of approximately 15 miles (24 km) around either the head or foot of the lake.

The historic county boundary between Lancashire and Westmorland runs down the western shore of the lake and also along about three miles (5 km) of the southern section of the eastern shore. Anyone crossing the lake from east to west on the Windermere Ferry thus travels from the historic county of Westmorland to that of Lancashire.

== History ==
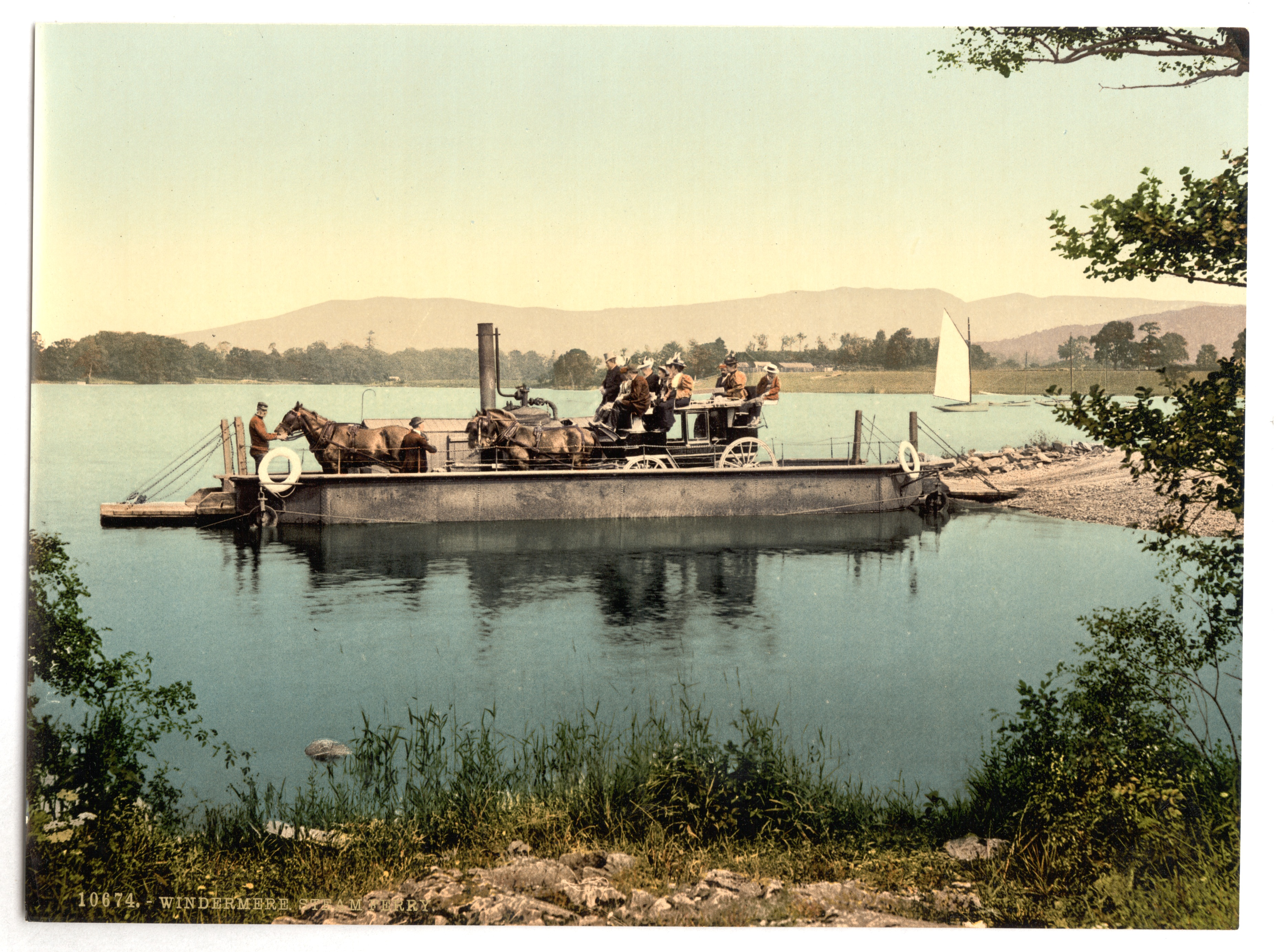
A steam ferry on the route in the late 19th century

There has been a ferry at the site of the current Windermere Ferry for more than 500 years, with the earliest craft being rowed across the lake. During this period there was one recorded disaster, in 1635, when the ferry capsized and forty-seven people perished. The first cable ferry, powered by steam, commenced operation in 1870. New ferry boats were introduced to the route in 1915 and 1954, when a boat named Drake was introduced.

The current ferry boat, named Mallard, was built in 1990 and can carry up to 18 cars and over 100 passengers. The ferry underwent its most recent five-yearly refit and full inspection in March 2019. The previous refit in 2014 cost £300,000 and involved rebuilding the engines and servicing all hydraulic, mechanical and electrical systems on the ferry, together with a full repaint.

On 26 May 2018, the Mallard suffered an engine room fire which disabled the ferry during a crossing. One of the local cruise boats provided emergency assistance and took the passengers on board. Whilst the ferry was out of action, Cumbria County Council arranged for Windermere Lake Cruises to continue a reduced pedestrian crossing over the lake. The Mallard returned to service on 27 October after having been repaired and fitted with a new engine.
