= Satterthwaite =

Village and civil parish in Lancashire, England

Coordinates: 54.3229°N 3.0192°W

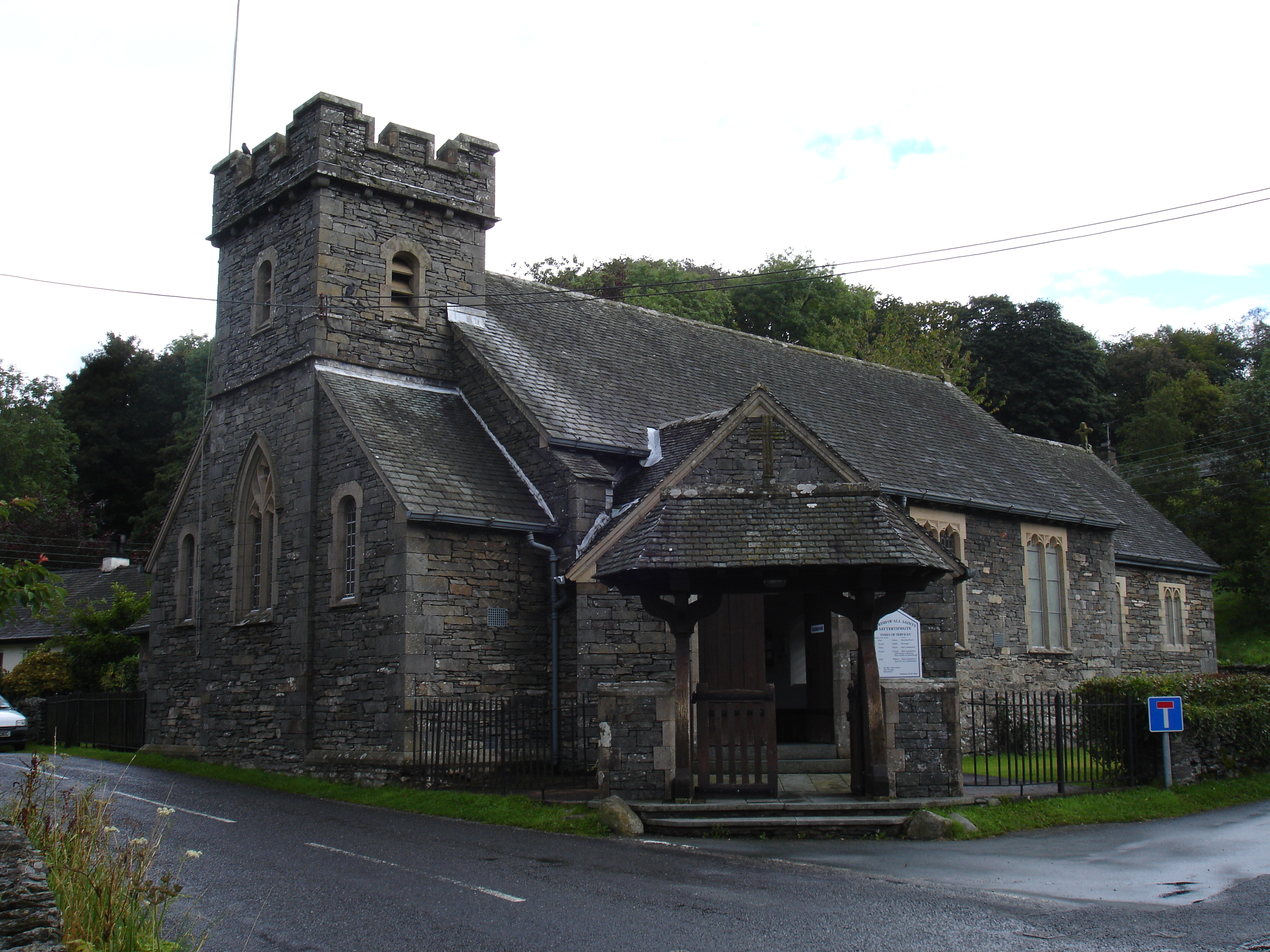
- All Saints' Parish Church

- Location in South Lakeland Location within Cumbria
- Population: 215 (2011 Census)
- OS grid reference: SD338923
- Civil parish: Satterthwaite
- Unitary authority: Westmorland and Furness
- Ceremonial county: Cumbria
- Region: North West
- Country: England
- Sovereign state: United Kingdom
- Post town: ULVERSTON
- Postcode district: LA12
- Dialling code: 01229
- Police: Cumbria
- Fire: Cumbria
- Ambulance: North West
- UK Parliament: Westmorland and Lonsdale

Satterthwaite is a small village (and civil parish) with around 50 dwellings situated in Grizedale, a valley in the Lake District, England, about four miles south of Hawkshead. It has a church, All Saints', and a Parish Room. The civil parish of Satterthwaite has its own community website. In the 2001 census the parish had a population of 257, decreasing at the 2011 census to 215. The population peaked in 1881 at 450 and has since gradually declined to the current day. In the 10 years to 1891 the population fell to 410 falling further to 325 in 1931. The population decline is probably due to rural urban migration.

In the 1870s Satterthwaite was described as "a village and a township-chapelry in Hawkshead parish, Lancashire."

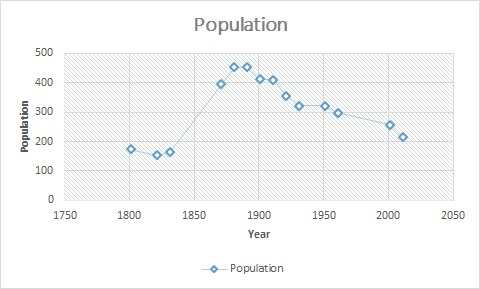
Population of Satterthwaite

== Housing ==
Satterthwaite contains a mixture of houses, in 2011 a total of 152 were in the vicinity, down from 166 in 2001. This change suggests houses may have been converted or changed into different establishments. In 2011, 104 of the 152 houses had at least one usual resident occupying the property compared to 112 out of 166 in 2001. In 2011 of the 152 houses 68 were detached, 57 semi-detached, 16 terraced and 10 flats. These houses occupy varies age groups. A total of 34 of these houses have 1 occupant living in them. Housing during the earlier years was very different to the housing of today in Satterthwaite. The difference was probably due to economy and capital flow that people had, as building a house required materials and expenses. With this though, in 1881 there was 82 houses in total. This obviously being a very different statistic than the numbers in the 2001 and 2011 census. In 10 years, 1891 only 10 new houses were built, this may have been an influx in population or that they had more land to build houses on. Again, the next 10 years 1901 only 2 houses were built. Then in 1921 there was a decline in houses, the previous 10 years was 94 but now it is 86. Satterthwaite grew as a place after the Second World War as new people arrived from the cities to work in forestry. In recent years, barn conversions have added to the number of properties, but around 50% of the buildings in Satterthwaite village are now second or holiday homes.

== Occupation ==
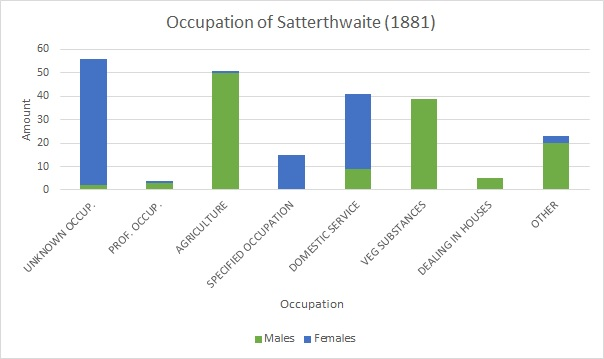
A bar chart showing the occupation of Satterthwaite

In Satterthwaite residents aged 16–74 that are in employment measure 137 in the year 2011, the majority of residents are employed, 29 residents were managers, directors and senior officials. The second highest job occupation is associate Professional and technical. These jobs seem to be highly qualified. 20 employees work on in the skilled trade section, incorporating their skills to work on houses throughout Satterthwaite. Another main occupation is caring, leisure and other service; 12 employees. Elementary occupations, qualified teachers count towards 18 occupation. Overall Satterthwaite has a range of occupations but they seem to require higher qualification jobs as for other districts. This should show how educated an area like Satterthwaite is. 2001 is consistently differently to 2011, all people aged 16–74 in employment totals 145 slightly more, this may be due to population decreasing since the last Census. Managers and senior officials count at 24. This is not the highest employment sector though, the main occupation is working in elementary valuing 27. Comparing this data to the occupational statistics in 1881 show a completely different aspect to life in Satterthwaite and shows the changes in industry as well as. This is probably due to improvements in technology as more advancing technology means people can become better and acquire different skills for more complex jobs. Education is also an advantage that people have in Satterthwaite at this current time compared to the occupational statistics in 1881. The main employment sector in 1881, for men, was agriculture. As Satterthwaite is a rural area and this was a large employment sector, agriculture is of high demand. Men usually do manual labour whereas women in that specific generations are more occupied in domestic jobs. This also shows as the main occupation for women in 1881 was domestic services or offices, the number of employed being 32. Yet again a large number of men work in the agriculture side of work, 39 males work in varies vegetable substances. These figures may have been more as it was difficult to find occupations in 1881.

== Demographics ==
In 2011 Satterthwaite residents mainly identified as white—213 of the 215 residents—with one person of mixed ethnicity and one Asian; 208 were born in the United Kingdom. In the 2011 Census, 208 of the 215 residents were born in the United Kingdom. 99% of households had English as their main language. Christianity was the most common religion, 135 out of 215; 52 residents were non-religious.

== Health and Care ==
Satterthwaite has a higher average of very good health compared to the whole of England. Satterthwaite has a 49.8% very good health rating whereas England has a percentage of 47.2%. The percentage of residents that have good health is also a high percentage, 32.6%. The only poor percentage rating is the 3.7% of which have bad health, even though this is a small value it may affect some residents. These percentages are relatively good but it is more realistic looking at genuine figures. In 2001 of all the 257 residents 187 of them have good health, it then declines rapidly. 53 have fairly good health and 17 have not good health. These figures are relatively good compared to England. In 2011 these figures change. The population being 215 and 107 of them having very good health and 70 of them have good health. In 10 years the health and well being of Satterthwaite has become better, probably due to technology advances.

Disability may affect an area like Satterthwaite but due to the fact the population is not as high as other areas the disability rate will not be as high. In 2011 the population was 215 and out of them only 9 had day to day impacts due to their disability or could not do activities as best as possible. People affected in a little was equalled 27 people out of 215, this figure small yet again. Finally, 179 people are not affected by any sort of disability in Satterthwaite.

== Places to Visit ==
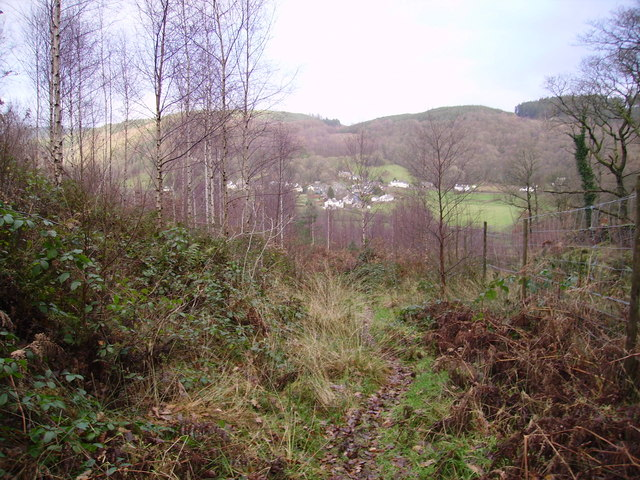
Satterthwaite from Hob Gill Plantation

Satterthwaite has some beautiful surrounding areas and places to visit. Some of the main places to visit are Grizedale Forest Park, Graythwaite Woods and Dale Park. Dale Park is ideal for leisure activities such as hiking and rambling. Grizedale is also ideal for leisure activities as the area of the land is 24.47km2 A campsite is the main attraction as well as cycling and walking paths. Within Grizedale is Force Forge and Force Mill. The water from Force Beck exits out of Grizedale Valley at Force Falls. Graythwaite is situated at the Southern Eastern corner of Satterthwaite Parish. The hall is closed to the public but the Graythwaite Hall Gardens are open to tourists.

== Land Use ==
The total area of all and types in Satterthwaite in square metres is 29,329.36. The area of domestic buildings incorporating in all the ground space equals 21.31 this leaves 14.65 square metres being non-domestic building use. The large majority of land in Satterthwaite is greenery but the area of road accumulates to 452.82, large public footpaths are also throughout Satterthwaite and contributing to 3.86 square metres.

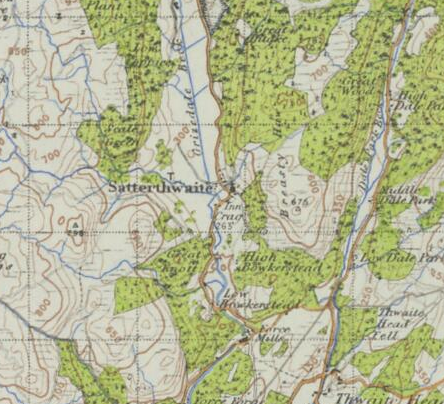
Historic Map of Satterthwaite

== See also ==
- Listed buildings in Satterthwaite
