= Claife =

Civil parish in Cumbria, England

Coordinates: 54.370°N 2.960°W

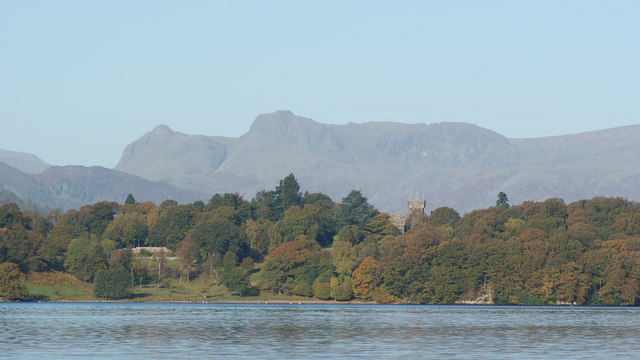
- Wray Castle and the Langdale Pikes

- Location in South Lakeland Location within Cumbria
- Population: 298 (2011)
- OS grid reference: SD3795
- Civil parish: Claife
- Unitary authority: Westmorland and Furness
- Ceremonial county: Cumbria
- Region: North West
- Country: England
- Sovereign state: United Kingdom
- Post town: AMBLESIDE
- Postcode district: LA22
- Dialling code: 01539
- Police: Cumbria
- Fire: Cumbria
- Ambulance: North West
- UK Parliament: Westmorland and Lonsdale

Claife is a civil parish in the Westmorland and Furness Unitary Authority of Cumbria, England. It is situated west of Windermere, and east of Esthwaite Water and the village of Hawkshead. In the 2001 census the parish had a population of 392, reducing to 298 at the 2011 census. Settlements in the parish include two villages, Near and Far Sawrey in the south; and the hamlets of High Wray, Low Wray, Colthouse and Loanthwaite in the north.

In the central area of the parish is Claife Heights, a hilly area which rises to 800 feet (240 m) above sea level at Latterbarrow and contains several tarns. There is one major road in the parish, the B5285 connecting Hawkshead to the Windermere Ferry terminus at Far Sawrey.

At Low Wray is Wray Castle, a 19th-century house and grounds now owned by the National Trust. Many of the woodlands in the parish, including the area alongside Windermere are part of the National Trust's Hawkshead and Claife property.

== See also ==
- Listed buildings in Claife
