= One Hour in Wonderland =

1950 American television special

- Country of origin: United States
- Original language: English

Production
- Producer: Bill Walsh
- Production company: Walt Disney Productions

Original release
- Network: NBC
- Release: December 25, 1950

One Hour in Wonderland is a 1950 television special made by Walt Disney Productions. It was first seen on Christmas Day, 1950, over NBC (4–5 pm in all time zones) for Coca-Cola, and was Walt Disney's first television production. It featured Disney as host, with Bobby Driscoll, Kathryn Beaumont, Edgar Bergen & Charlie McCarthy (who appeared on radio for Coke), and other celebrities who worked with Disney, including the Firehouse Five Plus Two jazz band. This special was actually a promotional program for Disney's upcoming theatrical feature, Alice in Wonderland. Kathryn Beaumont, who voiced Alice, was dressed like her for this television special.

This television special was included as a bonus feature on the Masterpiece and Un-Anniversary DVD editions of Alice in Wonderland, as well as the 2011 Blu-ray release and the Exclusive Archive Collection laserdisc box set release. Most notably, the home media release of this special marks one of the rare occasions Disney has released Song of the South in any capacity, due to a 7 minute excerpt being featured in it.

== Synopsis ==
Edgar Bergen informs Charlie McCarthy and Mortimer Snerd that Walt Disney has invited them to a tea party. Charlie is hesitant to go, but reluctantly changes his mind when he learns Kathryn Beaumont will be there. While driving to the studio, Edgar tells the story of Alice in Wonderland, much to Charlie's dismay. When they arrive, Walt Disney tells everyone that he was able to buy the Magic Mirror from Snow White (who apparently got it from the Wicked Queen). Charlie insults the mirror, calling it a "hopped-up television set." This enrages the mirror but Walt calms him down. The Mirror then shows everybody what they wish to see. He shows Kathryn a scene from Snow White and the Seven Dwarfs, Charlie the Mickey Mouse short Clock Cleaners (although Charlie wanted to see himself), Bobby Driscoll a Br'er Rabbit story, Mortimer a Pluto short, and Edgar, Disney's animation studios. There, the animators (played by Firehouse Five Plus Two) take advantage of Walt's absence to have fun playing jingle bells instead of working. At the end of the song, they realize Walt is watching, and frantically finish a scene with Tweedledee and Tweedledum. The Mirror at first refuses to show the unfinished Alice in Wonderland, but changes his mind when everyone wants to see it. The Mirror then reluctantly shows a scene from the film. At the end of the special, Edgar has acquired the Magic Mirror. Charlie tries to make a deal with the mirror, but it turns out Mortimer is the new slave of the magic mirror. Charlie changes his mind and goes to sleep.

== Segments ==
- Seven Dwarves' Party for Snow White (Snow White and the Seven Dwarfs) - 1937
- Clock Cleaners (Mickey Mouse) - 1937
- Br'er Rabbit Runs Away (Song of the South) - 1946
- Bone Trouble (Pluto) - 1940
- Jingle Bells (made for the special) - performed by Firehouse Five Plus Two
- The Mad Tea Party (Alice in Wonderland) - 1950/1951

== Cast ==
- Walt Disney as himself and Mickey Mouse (voice)
- Kathryn Beaumont as herself and Alice
- Bobby Driscoll as himself
- Edgar Bergen as himself, Charlie McCarthy, and Mortimer Snerd
- Hans Conried as Magic Mirror (it was voiced by Moroni Olsen in the animated film)
- Adriana Caselotti as Snow White (voice, archive footage)
- Roy Atwell as Doc (voice, archive footage)
- Otis Harlan as Happy (voice, archive footage)
- Pinto Colvig as Sleepy, Grumpy, Goofy, and Pluto (voice, archive footage)
- Scotty Mattraw as Bashful (voice, archive footage)
- Billy Gilbert as Sneezy (voice, archive footage)
- Clarence Nash as Donald Duck (voice)
- James Baskett as Uncle Remus and Br'er Fox (voice, posthumously)
- Johnny Lee as Br'er Rabbit (voice, archive footage)
- Nick Stewart as Br'er Bear (voice, archive footage)
- Ed Wynn as Mad Hatter (voice)
- Jerry Colonna as March Hare (voice)
- Jimmy MacDonald as Dormouse (voice)
- Bill Thompson as White Rabbit (voice)
- Firehouse Five Plus Two as themselves
- Diane Marie Disney as herself
- Sharon Mae Disney as herself
