= Br'er Rabbit Earns a Dollar a Minute =

African American folktale

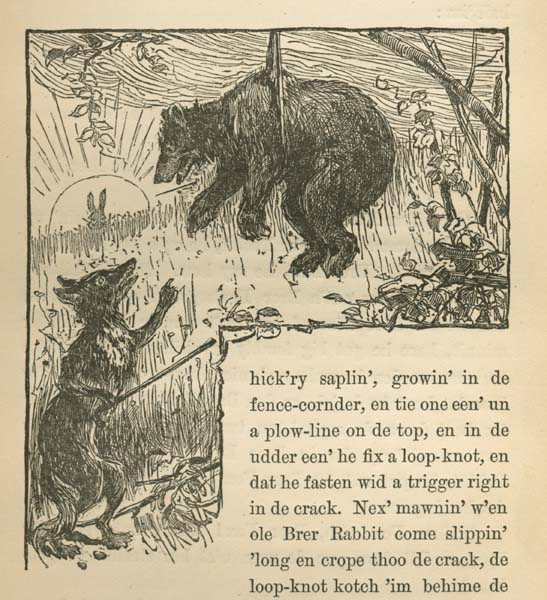
Br'er Bear falls for the trap set for Br'er Rabbit.

"Br'er Rabbit Earns a Dollar a Minute" is a traditional African American folktale, featuring Br'er Rabbit, Br'er Fox and Br'er Bear. It is famous for its inclusion among Joel Chandler Harris' Uncle Remus stories. Although its folk roots most likely trace back to ancient Africa, the folktale's first written appearance was as a chapter titled "Mr. Rabbit and Mr. Bear" in Uncle Remus: His Songs and Sayings, published in 1881.

== Synopsis ==
Like many short stories featuring Br'er Rabbit, the tale describes one of the trickster's successful attempts to talk his way out of a difficult situation. Br'er Rabbit is sneaking into Br'er Fox's garden to steal goober peas (peanuts) when he gets caught in a snare trap laid by Br'er Fox. Suspended awkwardly in mid-air, unable to free himself, he worries what will happen when Br'er Fox finds him caught in his trap. He then sees the notoriously slow-witted Br'er Bear approaching and quickly thinks of a way to trick Br'er Bear into freeing him.

Feigning a cheerful complacency, he tells Br'er Bear that he is hanging there because Br'er Fox has been paying him "a dollar a minute" to act as a scarecrow for the garden. He offers to let Br'er Bear take over the "job". Excited by the promise of quick wealth, Br'er Bear gladly helps free Br'er Rabbit and takes his place in the trap. Br'er Rabbit laughs and scampers away before Br'er Bear realizes that he has been tricked.

== In popular culture ==
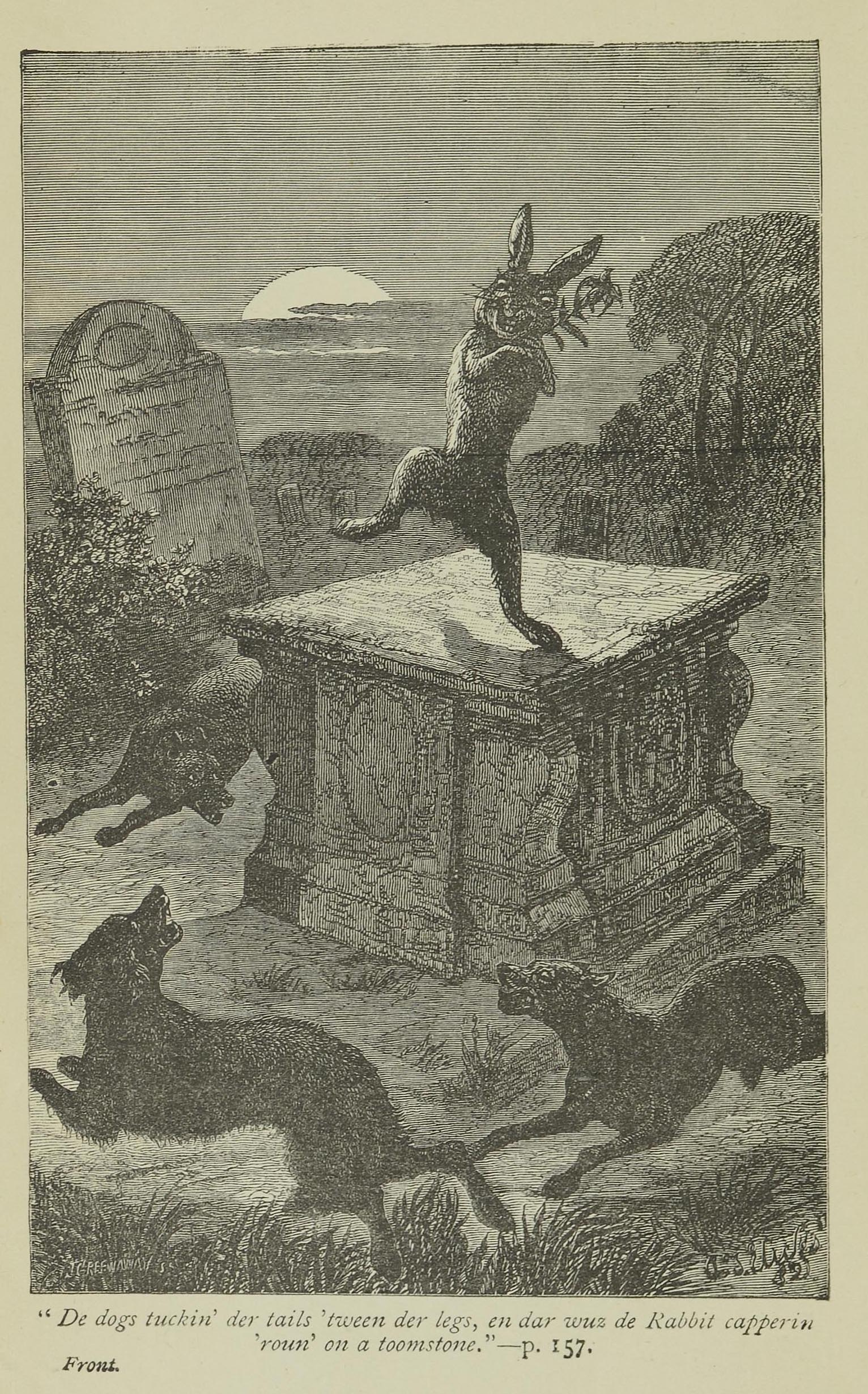
Uncle Remus, or, Mr. Fox, Mr. Rabbit, and Mr. Terrapin, 1891

The story was used in the movie Song of the South, along with "The Tar Baby" and "The Laughing Place", but with one difference; Br'er Rabbit, instead of intending to steal some of Br'er Fox's peanut crop, decided to run away, fed up with life at his briar patch, and while running away he happens to get caught in a snare trap set by Br'er Fox, right at the edge of a cornfield. It is also referenced in the first dark ride scene of Splash Mountain, a log flume-style attraction based on Song of the South at Tokyo Disneyland, and formerly at Disneyland and Magic Kingdom.
