= Uncle Remus and His Tales of Br'er Rabbit =

1945-1972 American comic strip

- Author(s): Bill Walsh, George Stallings, Jack Boyd
- Illustrator(s): Paul Murry, Dick Moores, Bill Wright, Riley Thomson, Chuck Fuson, John Ushler
- Current status/schedule: Concluded Sunday strip
- Launch date: October 14, 1945
- End date: December 31, 1972
- Syndicate(s): King Features Syndicate
- Genre: Funny animals

Uncle Remus and His Tales of Br'er Rabbit is an American Disney comic strip that ran on Sundays from October 14, 1945, to December 31, 1972. It first appeared as a topper strip for the Mickey Mouse Sunday page, but after the first few years, almost always appeared on its own. The strip replaced the 1932-1945 Silly Symphony strip, which had spent its final year on gag strips featuring Panchito from The Three Caballeros.

The Uncle Remus strip began as a "preview" of the Walt Disney Productions film Song of the South, which premiered a year later, on November 12, 1946. Disney had previously released comic strip adaptations of its animated feature films as part of the Silly Symphony Sunday strip, starting with Snow White and the Seven Dwarfs (1937–38), and continuing with Pinocchio (1939–40) and Bambi (1942). While those strips each ran for four to five months, and only told the story of the film, the Uncle Remus strip continued for almost thirty years, telling new stories of Br'er Rabbit, his friends and his enemies, until the strip was discontinued on December 31, 1972.

== Origin ==
In 1881, journalist, fiction writer and folklorist Joel Chandler Harris published Uncle Remus, His Songs and His Sayings: The Folk-Lore of the Old Plantation, a collection of animal stories, songs and folklore collected from southern black Americans, told in a Deep South Negro dialect. The book was well-received, and Harris published five more Uncle Remus books between 1883 and 1907, with a further three books published posthumously, following his death in 1907.

In the books, Uncle Remus, a kindly former slave, tells stories to a group of children, passing on the folktales of his culture. The stories involve Br'er Rabbit, a trickster figure who eludes captivity and danger by outsmarting the more powerful predators, Br'er Fox and Br'er Bear.

The stories were adapted into comics form twice in the early 1900s. In 1902, artist Jean Mohr adapted the Uncle Remus stories into a two-page comic story titled Ole Br'er Rabbit for The North American. The McClure Newspaper Syndicate also released a Br'er Rabbit Sunday strip drawn by J.M. Condé from June 24 to October 7, 1906.

In 1939, Walt Disney began developing Uncle Remus as a full-length animated feature film, although it took seven years to reach the screens. By 1944, the project was titled Song of the South. The movie was released in November 1946, and is a mixture of live-action and animation; 25 minutes of the film's 94-minute running time consists of three animated sequences: "Br'er Rabbit Runs Away" (~8 min), "Br'er Rabbit and the Tar Baby" (~12 min) and "Br'er Rabbit's Laughing Place" (~5 min).

== Comic strip ==
Uncle Remus and His Tales of Br'er Rabbit launched on October 14, 1945, a year before the film's release. It was written by Bill Walsh, who had joined the studio in 1943 and was writing the Mickey Mouse comic strip with artists Floyd Gottfredson and Dick Moores. Walsh also wrote the Panchito gags in the Silly Symphony strip from 1944 to 1945 with Paul Murry and Moores. When the Silly Symphony strip ended and transitioned to Uncle Remus, Walsh, Murry and Moores continued as the strip's creative team.

The strip featured Br'er Rabbit, Br'er Bear and Br'er Fox, in a faithful adaptation of the movie's three animated sequences. Uncle Remus himself only appeared in silhouette in the opening panel, and provided narration and the closing moral in the final panel. These homilies included "Jumpin' into trubble is a heap easier than jumpin' out!" and "Twixt right an' wrong thar ain't no middle path!"

The strips used the material from Song of the South for the first twelve weeks. The first three strips told the story of "Br'er Rabbit Runs Away" (Oct 14-28, 1945). The second three adapted "Br'er Rabbit's Laughing Place" (Nov 4-18, 1945). "Br'er Rabbit and the Tar Baby" occupied the next six weeks (Nov 25-Dec 30, 1945). After three months, the team ran out of material and started creating original stories. The first few years of the strip featured short story continuities.

Paul Murry left the Disney studio in July 1946, leaving Moores as the artist of the strip for the next five years. Murry went to Dell Comics to draw Disney comic book stories; his first comic, Dell's Four Color #129, featured three Br'er Rabbit stories. In 1947, Murry drew two more Br'er Rabbit stories for Walt Disney's Comics and Stories #76 and #77, and a couple more for Four Color #208 (1949) before moving on from the character for good.

Bill Walsh left the strip in October 1946, and George Stallings became the writer. Stallings and Moores introduced new characters, such as Br'er Rabbit's girlfriend Molly Cottontail and two new villains, Br'er Weasel and Br'er Buzzard. Characters introduced later in the strip include Br'er Tarripin, Br'er Possum, Br'er Gopher, Br'er 'Gator, Sis Goose, and Br'er Rabbit's mother, Mammy Rabbit. As of February 20, 1949—three years into Stallings's tenure—the strip became a gag-a-week strip.

Stallings stayed on the strip for 17 years, from October 1946 to October 1963. Dick Moores left in 1951, and was followed by Riley Thompson (1951–59), Bill Wright (1959-62) and John Ushler (1962-1972). Jack Boyd wrote the strip for the final ten years. Reflecting on the strip's last decade, comics historian Maurice Horn writes, "In 1962 John Ushler brought in the rear (in a stylistic as well as a chronological sense) in a succession of limp Uncle Remus pages until the series' end on December 31, 1972."

== Reprints ==
Uncle Remus strips have been reprinted in several Disney comic books around the world, including France's Le Journal de Mickey in 1953, Brazil's O Pato Donald (1950-1954) and Belgium's Mickey Magazine (1950-1954).

The strip was rarely reprinted in the United States. Gladstone Comics reprinted a brief run of stories in Walt Disney's Comics & Stories in 1987:

- WDC&S #516 (March 1987): "De Famine", strips from Jan 27-Feb 17, 1946
- WDC&S #518 (May 1987): "De Honey Tree", strips from Aug 11-25, 1946
- WDC&S #519 (June 1987): "Cuzzin Wolf", strips from July 21-Aug 4, 1946
- WDC&S #520 (July 1987): "De Contest", strips from April 28-May 19, 1946

Disney Comics featured a Br'er Rabbit reprint in WDC&S #576 (Oct 1992), covering two connected Uncle Remus serials from August 31 to December 7, 1947 (minus the strips of August 24 and September 28, both originally part of continuity). Other Disney Comics issues featured other Br'er Rabbit stories, but not taken from the comic strip.

In 2006, Gemstone Comics' Walt Disney Treasures trade paperback celebrating 75 years of Disney comics included a Br'er Rabbit story, "The Money Mint", reprinting Uncle Remus strips from February 24 to March 17, 1946. Other Gemstone issues featured other Br'er Rabbit stories, but not taken from the comic strip.

In 2016, IDW Publishing's WDC&S #731 (May 2016) included a short Br'er Rabbit story, "Petrified Perfection," reprinting the Uncle Remus strip from May 17, 1953. Other IDW issues featured other Br'er Rabbit stories, but not taken from the comic strip.

In IDW's 2017 reprinting of the Disney Christmas Story strip, the 1986 sequence starring Uncle Remus and the Brer characters was specifically omitted, while the earlier 1976 and 1980 sequences—featuring some Brer characters, but not Remus—were left intact.

== Creators ==
Writer and artist credits:

- Bill Walsh, Paul Murry & Dick Moores: Oct 14, 1945 - Feb 17, 1946
- Bill Walsh, Paul Murry & Bill Wright: Feb 24 - July 14, 1946
- Bill Walsh & Dick Moores: July 21 - Oct 6, 1946
- George Stallings & Dick Moores: Oct 13, 1946 - Feb 4, 1951 (the strip became gag-a-week on Feb 20, 1949)
- George Stallings & Riley Thomson: Feb 11, 1951 - Nov 22, 1959
- George Stallings & Bill Wright: Nov 29, 1959 - Sept 2, 1962
- George Stallings & Chuck Fuson: Sept 9-16, 1962
- George Stallings & John Ushler: Sept 23, 1962 - Oct 13, 1963
- Jack Boyd & John Ushler: Oct 20, 1963 - Dec 31, 1972
