= The Laughing Place =

Traditional African American folktale

Folk tale
- Name: The Laughing Place
- Mythology: Uncle Remus
- Country: United States
- Region: Southern United States
- Related: Br'er Rabbit; Br'er Fox and Br'er Bear

The Laughing Place is a traditional African American folktale, featuring Br'er Rabbit, Br'er Fox and Br'er Bear. It is famous for its inclusion among Joel Chandler Harris' Uncle Remus stories.

== Summary ==
Following Br'er Rabbit's capture, the hero leads his captors, wily Br'er Fox and dim-witted Br'er Bear, to his "laughin' place". Out of curiosity, they let him lead the way, only for Br'er Rabbit to walk them straight into a cavern of bees. While the antagonists are stung, Br'er Rabbit escapes.

This story can be traced to African trickster tales, particularly the hare that figures prominently in the storytelling traditions in Western Africa, Central Africa, and Southern Africa. In the Akan traditions of West Africa, the trickster is usually the spider (see Anansi), though the plots of tales of the spider are often identical with those of stories of Br'er Rabbit.

== In popular culture ==
The story was used in the 1946 film Song of the South along with "The Tar Baby" and "The Briar Patch". It is also referenced in a dark ride scene of Splash Mountain, a log flume-style attraction based on Song of the South at Tokyo Disneyland and formerly at Disneyland and Magic Kingdom.

The term "The Laughing Place" is also used in the Stephen King novel Misery and the second season of the television series Castle Rock.
