= Splash Mountain =

Ride at Tokyo Disneyland and former ride at Disneyland and Magic Kingdom

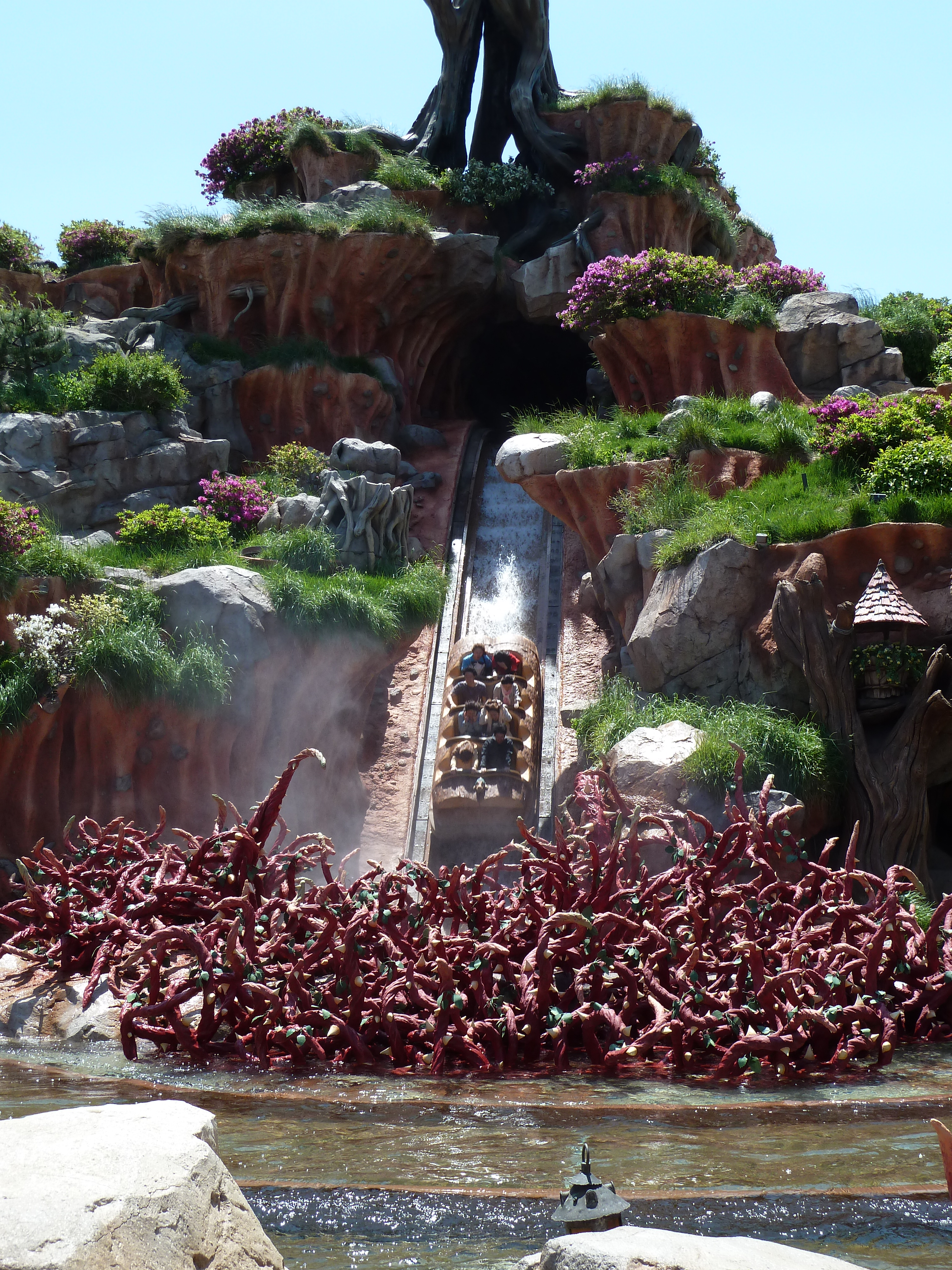
- Splash Mountain at Tokyo Disneyland

Tokyo Disneyland
- Area: Critter Country
- Status: Operating
- Opening date: October 1, 1992

Disneyland
- Area: Critter Country
- Status: Closed
- Opening date: July 17, 1989
- Closing date: May 31, 2023
- Replaced by: Tiana's Bayou Adventure

Magic Kingdom
- Area: Frontierland
- Status: Closed
- Opening date: October 2, 1992
- Closing date: January 23, 2023
- Replaced by: Tiana's Bayou Adventure

General statistics
- Type: Log flume
- Designer: Walt Disney Imagineering
- Lift system: 2
- Drop: 52.5 ft (16.0 m)
- Speed: 45 mph (72 km/h)
- Duration: 9:18 (Disneyland); 10:00 (Tokyo Disneyland); 11:45 (Magic Kingdom)
- Height restriction: 40 in (102 cm)
- Manufacturer: Hopkins Rides (Disneyland)
- Audio-animatronics: 103 (Anaheim); 68 (Orlando)
- Restraint: Lap bar (Tokyo Disneyland and Magic Kingdom only)
- Number of drops: 3 (Disneyland); 4 (Tokyo Disneyland); 5 (Magic Kingdom)
- Length: 2640 feet (Disneyland); 2800 feet (Tokyo Disneyland); 2600 feet (Magic Kingdom)
- Theme: Song of the South
- Height restriction at Tokyo Disneyland: 35 inches (90 cm)
- Disney Premier Access available at Tokyo Disneyland
- Wheelchair accessible
- Must transfer from wheelchair

Splash Mountain is a log flume ride at Tokyo Disneyland. Other versions, which have since been rethemed, were formerly located at Disneyland in California and Magic Kingdom in Florida. The attraction is based on the animated sequences of Disney's 1946 film Song of the South. The ride experience begins with an outdoor float-through that leads to indoor dark ride segments, with a climactic steep drop followed by an indoor finale. The drop is 52.5 feet (16.0 meters).

The original Splash Mountain opened at Disneyland in July 1989, followed by the Tokyo Disneyland and Magic Kingdom versions in October 1992. In June 2020, it was announced that the U.S. versions of the ride would be receiving a new theme based on Disney Animation's 2009 film The Princess and the Frog. The Magic Kingdom version of Splash Mountain closed on January 23, 2023, while the Disneyland version closed on May 31, 2023. The replacement, which is titled Tiana's Bayou Adventure, opened on June 28, 2024 at Magic Kingdom and on November 15, 2024 at Disneyland.

== Story ==
The plot of Splash Mountain is a composite of the Uncle Remus stories from the animated segments of the film Song of the South. The attraction tells the story of Br'er Rabbit, a mischievous trickster who leaves his home in search of adventure. Br'er Fox and Br'er Bear, the antagonists of the story, are determined to catch him. Br'er Rabbit avoids a snare trap (as described in "Br'er Rabbit Earns a Dollar a Minute") and uses it to trap Br'er Bear instead. Br'er Rabbit continues on his journey to find his "laughing place". Out of curiosity, his foes follow only for Br'er Rabbit to lead them into a cavern of bees. Br'er Fox eventually catches Br'er Rabbit and threatens to eat him. Br'er Rabbit uses reverse psychology on Br'er Fox, begging him not to throw him into the briar patch (as described in "The Tar Baby"). Br'er Fox then throws Br'er Rabbit into the briar patch (represented by the ride's final drop) and Br'er Rabbit escapes uninjured. Br'er Rabbit resolves to remain at his home in the briar patch as the other animals rejoice at his return, while Br'er Fox and Br'er Bear are seen narrowly escaping the jaws of Br'er Gator.

Two differences in the attraction's plot compared to the film are the exclusion of the Uncle Remus character as a storytelling device (he is replaced by Br'er Frog as a narrator) and changing Br'er Rabbit's method of capture from being stuck in tar to being stuck in a beehive.

== History ==
Splash Mountain was originally conceived in 1983 by Imagineer Tony Baxter. He wanted to attract guests to the often-empty Bear Country (known today as Bayou Country) land in Disneyland, with its single attraction being the Country Bear Jamboree (1972–2001), plus a souvenir shop, and make use of the Audio-Animatronics figures from the Disneyland attraction America Sings (1974–1988), which was also poorly attended. Dick Nunis (then-president of Walt Disney attractions) insisted that the Imagineers create a log flume for Disneyland, but the Imagineers were initially unenthusiastic about it, feeling that log flumes were too ordinary a theme park attraction to include in a Disney park. While trying to solve the issues of including a log flume, bringing people into Bear Country, and reusing the America Sings figures, Baxter thought of Song of the South.

According to Baxter, the name of the ride was originally going to be Zip-a-Dee River Run. However, at the same time that the ride was being developed, Walt Disney Studios was coming out with the film Splash (1984). The studio executives saw the Imagineers' plans, and since it was a water attraction, they urged the Imagineers to include Daryl Hannah's mermaid character from Splash in the ride. Baxter refused, stating that the mermaid did not fit in with the Br'er Rabbit story. So the executives instead asked him to name the ride Splash Mountain. The character figures from America Sings were used in many scenes, though the Br'er Rabbit, Br'er Fox and Br'er Bear figures were specifically created for Splash Mountain.

Plans to build the ride were unveiled in January 1987. At the time of its announcement, Disney officials stated they would not be expecting criticism for its Song of the South theming due to the ride only including the film's animated characters. Construction began at Disneyland in April of that year. By that time, Splash Mountain, whose budget had risen to $75 million, had become one of the most expensive projects created by Walt Disney Imagineering. The entire park cost around $17 million to build in 1955, equivalent to around $80 million in 1987. According to Alice Davis (wife of Disney animator and Imagineer Marc Davis), when America Sings closed in April 1988, production of Splash Mountain had gone far over budget. The only way to recover was to close down America Sings and use the character figures from that attraction. In anticipation of the opening of Splash Mountain, Bear Country was renamed Critter Country in 1988.

Splash Mountain was originally planned to open in January 1989, but was delayed to mid-February due to technical issues. The ride's opening was delayed again, to mid-July, due to boat problems. Test riders made up of company executives were getting soaked rather than lightly sprayed, so the boats were re-designed to be lighter, hold up to seven passengers instead of eight, and have an underwater scoop to keep too much water from leaking in.

Splash Mountain ultimately opened in Disneyland on July 17, 1989. To celebrate the opening, a television special was made called Ernest Goes to Splash Mountain. Actor and comedian Jim Varney returned to play Ernest in the special. Plans to install a camera that took photos of guests as they went down the final drop were unveiled in November 1990.

On January 14, 1990, Disney announced that Splash Mountain would be added to Magic Kingdom at Walt Disney World. In 1991, construction began for the attraction at Magic Kingdom and Tokyo Disneyland. On July 17, 1992, soft openings began at Magic Kingdom. The two versions of Splash Mountain officially opened within a day of each other in October 1992: the Tokyo Disneyland attraction opened on October 1, and the Magic Kingdom attraction opened on October 2. Since Tokyo Disneyland and Magic Kingdom never had an America Sings attraction, all of the Audio-Animatronics figures were built specifically for their respective versions of Splash Mountain, similar in design to the Disneyland figures.

In the late 1990s, the attraction at Disneyland received the nickname "Flash Mountain", as some female riders would briefly expose their breasts during the final drop, hoping to make illicit use of the on-ride photographs that Disney later sold to riders.

In January 2011, the Magic Kingdom location received lap bars for its ride vehicles. Each row of two to three passengers shares one lap bar. Meanwhile, Tokyo Disneyland received individual lap bars, which makes the height restriction 5 inches shorter than the other two versions.

During the 2018 season, the Magic Kingdom location received a new sponsorship by Ziploc. The company created custom plastic bags to protect belongings for guests who rode the attraction.

In June 2020, it was announced that the Disneyland and Magic Kingdom attractions would be re-themed based on the 2009 film The Princess and the Frog. Disney stated that the development of the project began in 2019, prior to the online petitions that were circulated during the George Floyd protests. The New York Times reported that Disney executives had privately discussed removing the attraction's Song of the South theme for at least five years, before putting into development a theme based on The Princess and the Frog. Baxter returned as a creative advisor for the project. A spokeswoman said that there are no plans to redesign the attraction at Tokyo Disneyland (which is owned and operated by the Oriental Land Company). In December 2022, it was announced that the Magic Kingdom version of Splash Mountain would close on January 23, 2023, and in April 2023, it was announced that the Disneyland version would close on May 31, 2023.

From July 1 to August 31, 2022, Splash Mountain at Tokyo Disneyland became Splash Mountain "Get Wet MAX" during which guests got more soaked than usual to get relief from the extremely hot and humid Tokyo summers. Get Wet MAX would return for the subsequent summer seasons.

== Attraction ==
The hollow tree stump on top of Splash Mountain is modeled after the exterior of Br'er Fox's lair in Song of the South and is called Chickapin Hill. The story "Br'er Rabbit Earns a Dollar a Minute" is told in the dark ride segment on the meandering river. The flume converts to a roller coaster-style track in complete darkness to transition to "The Laughing Place" caverns. After Br'er Rabbit is captured, the logs ascend up the attraction's predominant hill into the "Tar-Baby" segment (although in the attraction the tar baby is replaced with a beehive). Br'er Rabbit, now captured by Br'er Fox, tricks the villain into throwing him into the briar patch; the drop itself mimics Br'er Rabbit's fall. The log descends a 56-foot drop into a briar patch before continuing back into the mountain, where numerous Audio-Animatronic animals sing a chorus of "Zip-a-Dee-Doo-Dah".

=== Disneyland ===
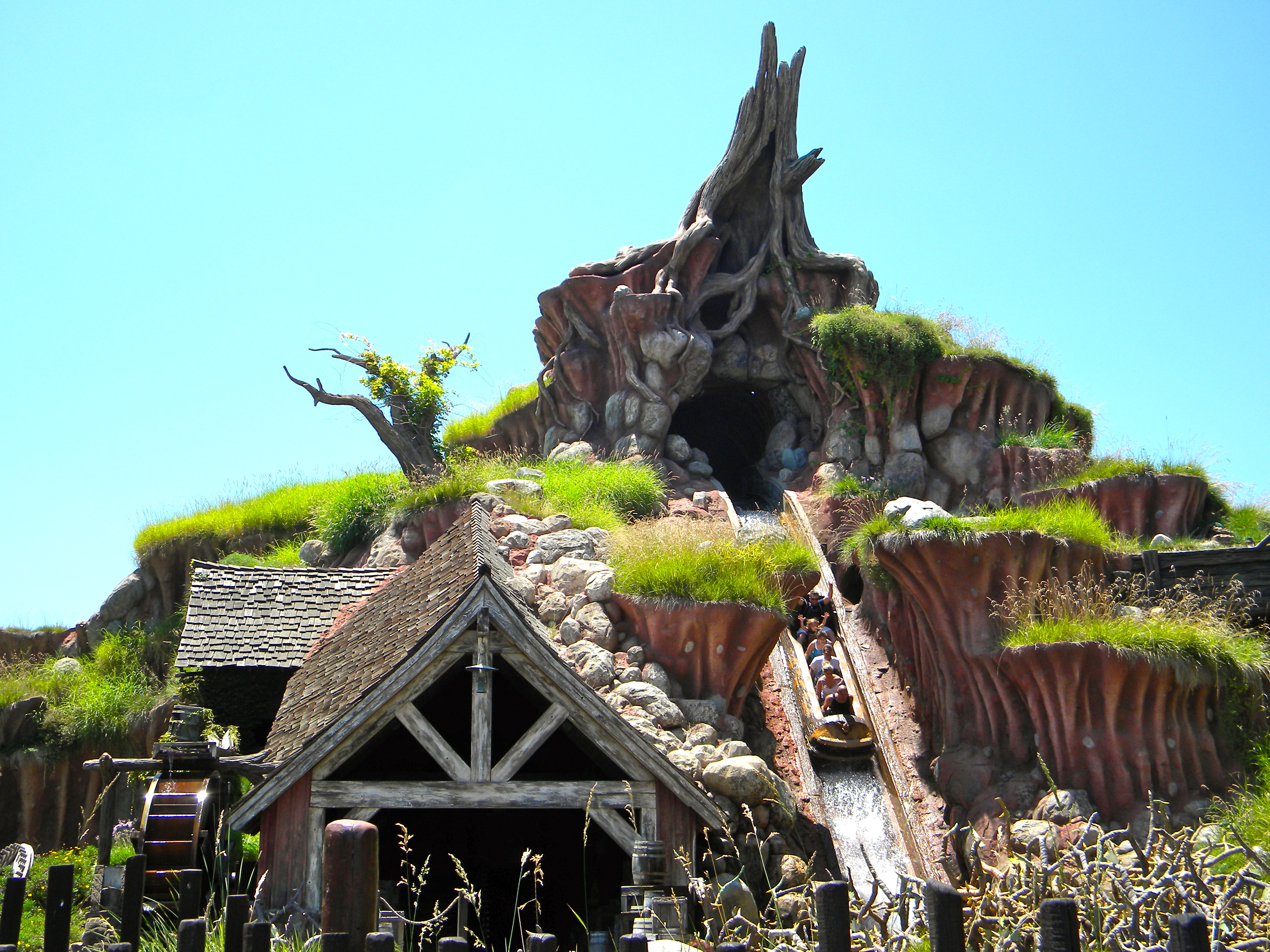
Splash Mountain as it appeared at Disneyland

The attraction was located in Critter Country (known today as Bayou Country). Passengers rode aboard six-to-seven-seater logs with six single-file seats. The log departed the loading area and ascended two conveyor-type lifts before floating gently through scenery designed to evoke the feeling of a river. The homes of the three main characters were incorporated into the landscape, and an instrumental version of "How Do You Do?" played.

Before the logs entered the indoor portion, snoring was heard emanating from Br'er Bear's home. After a short drop, guests entered the indoor portion of the attraction, where animals such as geese and frogs sang "How Do You Do?". After rounding a corner, riders saw Br'er Bear caught in a trap while Br'er Fox berated him and told him "We gotta catch that Br'er Rabbit!". Br'er Rabbit, seen outside his Briar Patch, told Br'er Turtle that he is leaving home in search of adventure, and is heading for his Laughin' Place. Along the way, guests encountered an alligator encouraging them to take him along. Br'er Bear followed Br'er Rabbit only for the "Laughin' Place" to actually be a trick, and Br'er Bear winded up being attacked by bees as Br'er Rabbit laughed at the sight. Riders progressed through caverns, where animals such as chickens, storks, a goose and a turkey sang "Everybody's Got a Laughin' Place".

Br'er Fox then managed to trap Br'er Rabbit in a beehive. The mood turned ominous as a mother opossum and a mother rabbit sang "Burrow's Lament" as a warning to their respective children. At the base of the final lift hill, two vultures taunted the riders. The logs began the final ascent and shortly before the attraction's climactic drop, Br'er Rabbit was seen alongside the hill, about to be eaten by Br'er Fox, but Br'er Rabbit outsmarted Br'er Fox and Br'er Bear by tricking them into throwing him into the briar patch (where he was born and raised). Riders were sent down the final drop into the briar patch, mimicking his fall. An on-ride photo was taken as the log began to fall.

The log then dove through a tunnel into an underground runout. An outdoor flume segment followed the drop during which an instrumental version of "Zip-a-Dee-Doo-Dah" played, and the logs then entered into a final indoor section which featured a paddle wheel steamboat where a cast of animals sang "Zip-a-Dee-Doo-Dah" and the respective fates of Br'er Fox and Br'er Bear (fending off Br'er Gator) and Br'er Rabbit (reclined happily at home) were seen. As the log passed through this section, a series of glass windows could be seen near the ceiling, behind which was a tunnel used by the Disneyland Railroad track.

Before the return to the loading area, for many years riders were given a preview of their picture that was taken on the final drop via an overhead screen. Professor Barnaby Owl would call the riders' attention to the screen as he remarked on their expressions. However, in recent years the screen had been removed.

=== Tokyo Disneyland ===
The attraction is located in Critter Country and is very similar to how the Magic Kingdom version of the ride was, with a few exceptions. The ride's layout is nearly a mirror image of Magic Kingdom's version. The Tokyo version does not have a mill on the second lift hill (although it is used as the main entrance to the ride's queue). Instead, the logs go into a cave-like opening to begin the second ascent. Another difference from the Magic Kingdom version is that the first drop takes place in a dark cave, making the final drop the only outdoor one. The Tokyo version does not have an extra drop after the biggest drop while the Magic Kingdom version did.

=== Magic Kingdom ===
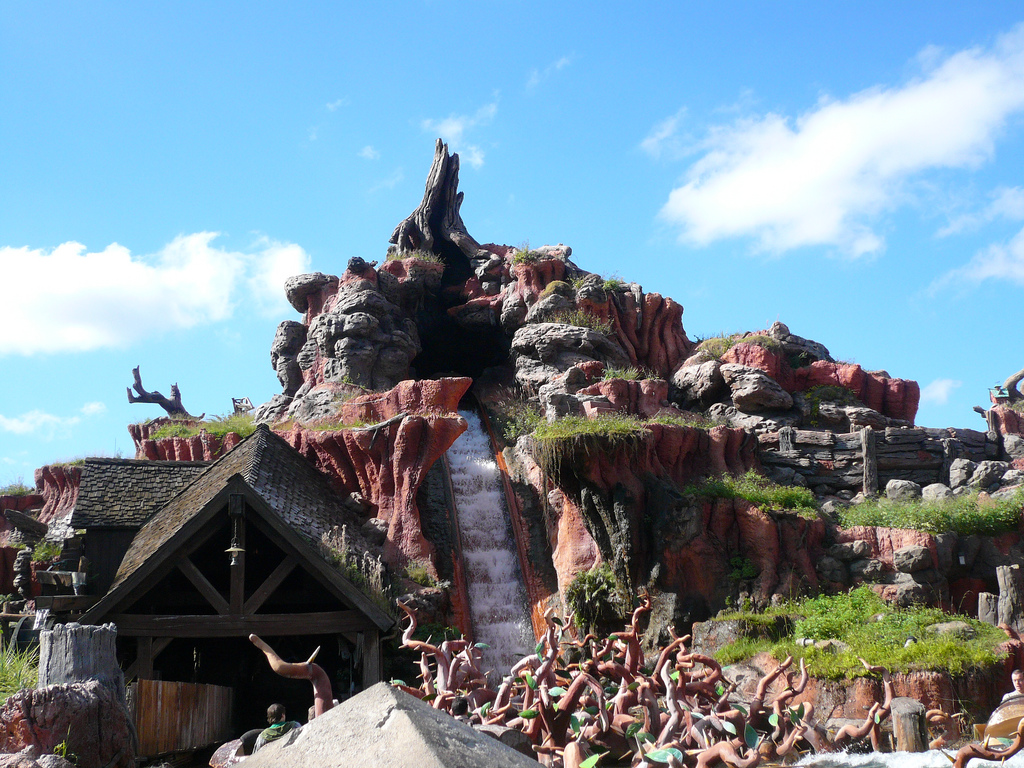
Splash Mountain as it appeared at Magic Kingdom in 2008

The attraction was located in Frontierland. Riders boarded eight-passenger logs, seated two by two, unlike Disneyland where they seated single file. Additionally, the ride vehicles moved at a slower pace compared to the vehicles at Disneyland. The log departed the loading area, where Br'er Frog provided introductory narration. The log ascended a dual-chain lift that deposited riders in a small pond at the bottom of the big drop. After a right turn, logs entered the barn and climbed another lift to the space behind the visible mountain, before floating gently through scenery designed to evoke the feeling of a river. The homes of the three main characters were incorporated into the landscape, and an instrumental version of "How Do You Do?" played. After passing Br'er Bear's cave, the logs descended down a drop and crossed back under the flume. The logs then entered the show building containing the indoor portion of the attraction, where animals including geese and frogs sang "How Do You Do?".

Br'er Fox and Br'er Bear saw Br'er Rabbit telling Mr. Bluebird that he was going to his Laughing Place. Br'er Porcupine warned him of the danger ahead, but Br'er Rabbit continued on. "Everybody's Got a Laughing Place" began to play after Br'er Bear sprang Br'er Fox's rabbit trap. The logs continued onward past a roadrunner who asked to be taken along to the Laughin' Place, while opossums sang the song from overhead. The logs reached a dark tunnel followed by a drop into the Laughin' Place. Bees attacked Br'er Bear while Br'er Rabbit laughed with joy, unaware that Br'er Fox was behind him, preparing to drop a beehive on top of him. The logs then went over another short drop, and headed further into the cavern scenes. There, the logs passed by geyser-riding turtles, laughing singing bullfrogs, and dancing water fountains as the logs then arrived at a dark area in which Br'er Rabbit was caught by Br'er Fox in a cave of stalactites and stalagmites. Two vultures taunted riders as they began their ascent up the final lift. A scene to the left side of the flume showed Br'er Fox menacing Br'er Rabbit, with Br'er Rabbit pleading not to be thrown into the briar patch.

At the top of this third lift hill, the log descended the 50-foot (15 m) drop at a 45-degree angle, reached a maximum speed of 40 mph, into a tunnel underneath the Frontierland walkway. After another outdoor flume segment during which an instrumental version of "Zip-a-Dee-Doo-Dah" played, the log coasted back into the mountain, where animals were singing "Zip-a-Dee-Doo-Dah" in celebration of Br'er Rabbit's return, while Br'er Fox and Br'er Bear attempted to fend off Br'er Gator. At the end, Br'er Rabbit sang with Mr. Bluebird, telling him that he learned his lesson.

== Soundtrack ==
=== Disneyland ===
Splash Mountain at Disneyland featured music in a jazzy "big band" meets orchestral style, since the attraction was adjacent to New Orleans Square.

- "How Do You Do?" - Recorded specially for the ride in 1988 by The Floozies, a 29-piece band from Oregon. The backing track of 'Bom, bom, bom, bom...' that could be heard coming from the bullfrogs in accompaniment to the lyrics sung by the Geese was sung by 13 of the 29 members. Walter Steven "Sim" Hurgle (b. 1963) is the band's lead vocalist, and his voice could be heard singing most of the words, while his fellow band members provided harmony and backing vocals. One of the bullfrogs was voiced by veteran voice actor Thurl Ravenscroft.
- "Ev'rybody Has a Laughing Place" and "Burrow's Lament" - These songs were sung by Elisa, Georgia and Castell Newton, three sisters from California who worked for the Walt Disney Company at the time of the ride's construction. Castell and Elisa sang the words, while Georgia was responsible for the high-pitched, operatic 'ahh's' in the background, which were removed upon the song changing from "Sooner or Later" to "Burrow's Lament". Burrow's Lament was sung by B. J. Ward.
- "Zip-a-Dee-Doo-Dah" - A choir consisting of over 75 cast members was used to record this last score, recorded in the company's Burbank studios in 1987. Harnell sang a solo as Br'er Rabbit as the logs took their final turn back into the station.

In addition, several other songs from Song of the South were heard as instrumental tracks, playing on a loop in the queuing area. These included "That's What Uncle Remus Said", "Sooner or Later", "All I Want", "Who Wants to Live Like That", and "Let the Rain Pour Down." The loop lasted about 25 minutes.

=== Magic Kingdom ===
The ride at Magic Kingdom featured the same songs heard at the Disneyland attraction, which are variations of the three songs found in the animated segments from Song of the South, though the attraction did not present these songs in the same order as the film. Because the ride was located in Frontierland, the soundtrack featured banjos, harmonicas, and also because of Florida's proximity to Georgia, where Song of the South is set. "Burrow's Lament" was the exception, using an orchestral track with timpani drums originally recorded for the Disneyland version.

In the order heard in the attraction's ride-through segments:

- "How Do You Do?"
- "Ev'rybody's Got a Laughin' Place"
- "Zip-a-Dee-Doo-Dah"

Songs from the film heard as instrumental tracks in the queuing area included "That's What Uncle Remus Said", "Let the Rain Pour Down", "Sooner or Later", and the opening theme from the film. Traditional songs like "Old MacDonald Had a Farm" and "Goober Peas" were also played in a bluegrass style. The loop lasted about an hour, and included different orchestrations of the three main songs heard in the ride as well.

=== Tokyo Disneyland ===
Like in Magic Kingdom, the main melodies consist of banjos, fiddles and harmonicas. The vocals, however, are completely different from the Magic Kingdom attraction, with the specific verses sung within the show scenes arranged in different orders and the choruses and back-up vocals arranged with different harmonies. Additionally, dialogue and lyrics in Tokyo are Japanese for "How Do You Do?" and "Zip-a-Dee-Doo-Dah", but English for "Ev'rybody's Got a Laughin' Place". In both instances, "Burrow's Lament" is heard as an instrumental track with timpani drums (a take that was originally recorded for Disneyland, but never used), with dramatic orchestra and choir.

=== Music releases ===
Despite being released on CDs attributed to the Magic Kingdom or Walt Disney World in general, as well as often bearing specific track attribution (such as "from Walt Disney World's Splash Mountain"), the soundtrack found at Magic Kingdom and Tokyo Disneyland had at least managed to surface on the 2003 Walt Disney World CD entitled "The Official Album/Where Magic Lives". Banjos are heard for over halfway through the 7:57 length, as well as at the end. It is a very different musical arrangement when compared to many other "Walt Disney World", "Disneyland", or combination "Walt Disney World/Disneyland" CDs labeled as "The Official Album". The Disneyland ride did not incorporate this particular country-western-themed soundtrack.

Album	Track(s)	Length
The Official Album of Disneyland and Walt Disney World (1991 CD)	"Ev'rybody Has a Laughing Place"; "Zip-a-Dee-Doo-Dah"	
Disneyland/Walt Disney World: The Official Album (1997 CD)	"Zip-a-Dee-Doo-Dah"; "Ev'rybody Has a Laughing Place"	
Walt Disney World Resort: The Official Album (1999 CD)	"Ev'rybody Has a Laughing Place"	
Walt Disney World Resort: Official Album (2000 CD)	Medley attributed to Magic Kingdom	7:00
Official Album: Walt Disney World Resort Celebrating 100 Years of Magic (2001 CD)	Medley attributed to Magic Kingdom	8:00
Disneyland Park: The Official Album (2001 CD)	Medley	8:00
"The Official Album/Where Magic Lives": Walt Disney World (2003)	Country-western medley featuring banjos	7:57
A Musical History of Disneyland (2005)	Medley	12:00
Disney's Happiest Celebration on Earth (2005)	Medley featuring: "How Do You Do?"; "Ev'rybody Has a Laughing Place"; "Zip-a-Dee-Doo-Dah"	8:00
Walt Disney World's Four Parks One World Album (2008)	"How Do You Do?"; "Laughing Place"; "Zip-a-Dee-Doo-Dah"	
Disneyland Resort Official Album (2008)	Medley, same as previous, but also includes "bee buzz" non-vocal rendition of: "Ev'rybody Has a Laughing Place"; "Burrows Lament"	10:30
Disney Classics (2013)	Same medley attributed to the 2008 Disneyland album.	10:35
The Legacy Collection: Disneyland (2015)	Medley, same as previous, but does not include: Bees Buzzing to "Laughing Place"; "Burrow's Lament"	8:06

=== Queue Soundtrack (Disneyland) ===
- Everybody Has A Laughing Place (V1)
- Who Wants to Live Like That?
- Sooner or Later
- Uncle Remus Said
- Carriage Ride
- Let The Rain Pour Down
- Zip-A-Dee-Doo-Dah (V1)
- Everybody Has A Laughing Place (V2)
- Song of the South (Main Theme)
- How Do You Do?
- All I Want
- Zip-A-Dee-Doo-Dah (V2)

=== Queue Soundtrack (Tokyo Disneyland and Magic Kingdom) ===
- Little Brown Jug
- Shortnin' Bread
- Polly Wolly Doodle
- Froggy Went A-Courtin'
- Shoo Fly, Don't Bother Me
- Goober Peas
- How Do You Do?
- Let The Rain Pour Down
- Everybody Has A Laughing Place
- Song of the South (Main Theme)
- Camptown Races
- Dixie's Land
- Swing Low, Sweet Chariot
- When Johnny Comes Marching Home
- Uncle Remus Said
- Sooner or Later
- Who Wants to Live Like That?
- Zip-A-Dee-Doo-Dah
- She'll Be Comin' Round the Mountain
- Old MacDonald
- Skip To My Lou
- Freight Train Blues
- Wabash Cannonball
- St. James Infirmary Blues
- Tennessee Waltz
- Show Me The Way To Go Home
- Alabamy Bound
- Down by the Riverside
- My Old Kentucky Home
- Blue Moon of Kentucky
- Blue Ridge Mountain Blues
- Carolina Moon
- Deep River Blues
- Goodnight Ladies
- Honeycomb
- Jailhouse Blues
- Down by the Old Mill Stream
- Salty Dog Blues
- Up a Lazy River
- Tom Dooley
- Oh! Susanna
- John Henry
- Sixteen Tons
- I've Been Working on the Railroad
- When the Saints Go Marchin' In
- You Are My Sunshine

== Voice cast (Disneyland and Magic Kingdom) ==
- Br'er Rabbit, Mr. Bluebird, Geese, Vultures, Br'er Turtle, Bass Frog, Swamp Boys, Professor Barnaby Owl, Br'er Gator, Safety Announcer: Jess Harnell
- Br'er Fox: J. D. Hall
- Br'er Bear: Nick Stewart, Jess Harnell (some lines) (Disneyland version)/James Avery (Magic Kingdom version)
- Br'er Frog: James Avery
- Bullfrogs: Thurl Ravenscroft
- Laughing Place Bird, Mother Possum, Mother Rabbit: B. J. Ward (Disneyland version)

== See also ==
- List of incidents at Disneyland Resort
- List of incidents at Tokyo Disney Resort
- List of incidents at Walt Disney World
- List of Disney attractions using Audio-Animatronics
- List of former Disneyland attractions
- List of Magic Kingdom attractions
- List of Tokyo Disneyland attractions
- Tales of the Okefenokee, the similar ride in Six Flags Over Georgia
