= Nick Stewart =

American actor (1910–2000)

- Stewart as Lightnin' in The Amos 'n' Andy Show, 1951
- Born: Horace Winfred Stewart; March 15, 1910; New York City, U.S.
- Died: December 18, 2000 (aged 90); Los Angeles, California, U.S.
- Occupation: Actor
- Years active: 1932–1996
- Spouse: Edna Stewart (m. 1941)
- Children: 3

Horace Winfred "Nick" Stewart (March 15, 1910 – December 18, 2000), also billed as Nick O'Demus, was an American television and film actor. He was best known for his role as Lightnin' (Willie Jefferson) on TV's The Amos 'n' Andy Show (1951–1953).

== Acting career ==
Stewart was born on March 15, 1910, in Harlem, New York City, to Joseph (1888–1976) and Eva Stewart, who were recent immigrants from Barbados, British West Indies. He began his show business career as a dancer at the Cotton Club and Hoofers Club. Stewart also was a veteran of Broadway shows, having created a comedic character he called "Nicodemus" and playing that role in Swingin' the Dream and Louisiana Purchase, as well as in the film Go West, Young Man. Stewart also performed comedy as a cast member of the Rudy Vallée radio show in 1941. Other acting credits include the 1936 movie Go West Young Man, the voice of Specks Crow in Disney Animation's 1941 film Dumbo, the voice of Br'er Bear in Disney's 1946 film Song of the South and Willy-Willy on the television series Ramar of the Jungle. Also in 1954, Stewart had an important role in The Reign of Amelika Joe presented by Fireside Theatre. He also played the bartender during the club car scene in White Christmas (1954).

He was originally offered the role of Calhoun the lawyer, which he turned down. (After his refusal, it went to Johnny Lee, who had the role on radio since 1949.) Soon Gosden and Correll were back on the telephone, this time offering Stewart the role of Lightnin' on the television show. Stewart accepted the role with one idea in mind: to make enough money to be able to open his own theater where African Americans would not be typecast as maids and porters. In the 1960s, he would have small roles on Mister Ed and in the classic comedy film, It's a Mad, Mad, Mad, Mad World (1963) as the Migrant Truck Driver who is forced off of the road. In 1987, Doris McMillon devoted an entire week of her nightly talk show, On the Line with, to a discussion of the documentary Amos 'n' Andy: Anatomy of a Controversy, and the issues surrounding the shows. Stewart was one of the participants, discussing the show and his role in it. He also had a role in the 1954 film Carmen Jones.

Stewart's final acting role would be returning to Disney to reprise the voice role Br'er Bear for the Disneyland attraction Splash Mountain, based on the animated sequences of Song of the South.

== Ebony Showcase Theatre ==
He and his wife, Edna Stewart, also founded Los Angeles's Ebony Showcase Theatre, which provided a venue for numerous performers of all races, including Al Freeman Jr., Yuki Shimoda, William Schallert, Tom Ewell, John Amos, Nichelle Nichols, Isabel Sanford, B. B. King, Phil Collins, Eartha Kitt, Gladys Knight and Chaka Khan.

Founded in 1950, and first located on Washington Boulevard and Western Avenue, then on Crenshaw Boulevard, afterward on Adams Boulevard and later on Washington Boulevard in Los Angeles, Stewart filled the seats with quality productions. The couple did all remodeling of the building themselves, with the help of salvaged lumber from the CBS Television City construction site. Stewart hosted a variety show called Ebony Showcase Presents on KTTV from the theatre in 1953. Because CBS believed Nick Stewart's work with his theater was impairing his ability to perform on Amos 'n' Andy, he was notified that his contract would not be renewed; this was shortly before the decision to take the show off the air. By 1964, the Ebony Showcase had grown and moved again, this time to the Metro Theater near Washington and La Brea. Around this time, Nick Stewart wrote his own musical called Carnival Island. In 1973, Nick and Edna Stewart were honored by Los Angeles mayor Tom Bradley and the California Museum of Science and Industry's advisory board for their work with the Ebony Showcase theatre. During his years in vaudeville, Stewart and Milton Berle often worked together; Berle was a frequent visitor to the Ebony Showcase.

Although the Stewarts lost title to the theatre complex in 1992, they were allowed to stay there and operate the theater. and the buildings were later demolished. The couple used two homes they owned as collateral for a loan meant to save the theatre; both were lost. One of the issues which led to the theatre's financial problems was a Los Angeles law requiring all older brick buildings to meet current earthquake standards. The entire complex that had housed the Ebony Showcase organization, including a house not shown in the picture, was taken in eminent domain by the Los Angeles Community Redevelopment Agency. The theater edifice was demolished in 1998, the rest of the complex was demolished, building-by-building.

Stewart was given a Lifetime Achievement Award by the Beverly Hills/Hollywood NAACP. He also received the Living Legend award from the National Black Theatre Festival in 1995.

== Death and legacy ==
Stewart died of natural causes at his son's home in Los Angeles, California, on December 18, 2000, at age 90, a week after attending the groundbreaking ceremonies for the Performing Arts Center named for Los Angeles politician Nate Holden which was built on the site where the Ebony Showcase stood. The Ebony Showcase transformed, adapted, and did not close. Instead, the Ebony Showcase continues to provide entertainment, resources, and charitable services on the internet and in the community.

== Filmography ==
- Prosperity (1932) – Train Porter (uncredited)
- Go West, Young Man (1936) – Nicodemus
- Mind Your Own Business (1936) – Butler
- Dark Manhattan (1937) – Pete (uncredited)
- International Crime (1938) – Shoeshine Boy (uncredited)
- Wall Street Cowboy (1939) – Train Porter (uncredited)
- Robin Hood of the Pecos (1941) – Mose Johnson (uncredited)
- West of Cimarron (1941) – Jason Brown (uncredited)
- Dumbo (1941) – Specks Crow (voice, uncredited)
- The Meanest Man in the World (1943) – Elevator Operator (uncredited)
- Hit Parade of 1943 (1943) – Willie (uncredited)
- Cabin in the Sky (1943) – Dude
- My Son, the Hero (1943) – Nicodemus
- False Faces (1943) – Mack
- Stormy Weather (1943) – Cousin Jake (uncredited)
- Hoosier Holiday (1943) – Aloysius Lincoln
- The Heavenly Body (1944) – Willie (uncredited)
- Follow the Boys (1944) – Lt. Reynolds (uncredited)
- Andy Hardy's Blonde Trouble (1944) – Dining-Car Waiter (uncredited)
- Gildersleeve's Ghost (1944) – Chauncey – Haley's Chauffeur
- Zombies on Broadway (1945) – Worthington (uncredited)
- I Love a Bandleader (1945) – Willie Winters (uncredited)
- Abbott and Costello in Hollywood (1945) – Houseboy (uncredited)
- She Wouldn't Say Yes (1945) – Porter (uncredited)
- Dakota (1945) – Nicodemus
- One Way to Love (1946) – Julius (uncredited)
- Colonel Effingham's Raid (1946) – Ninety Eight the Orderly (uncredited)
- Behind Green Lights (1946) – Black Man (uncredited)
- Night and Day (1946) – Train Club Car Waiter (uncredited)
- Centennial Summer (1946) – Redcap (uncredited)
- Night Train to Memphis (1946) – Train Porter
- Three Little Girls in Blue (1946) – Mo – Stable Boy (uncredited)
- Song of the South (1946) – Br'er Bear (voice)
- The Perfect Marriage (1947) – (uncredited)
- Down to Earth (1947) – Porter (uncredited)
- The Voice of the Turtle (1947) – First Elevator Operator (uncredited)
- East Side, West Side (1949) – Red Cap (uncredited)
- No Holds Barred (1952) – Stick-Up Man
- The Moonlighter (1953) – Bank Janitor (uncredited)
- Return from the Sea (1954) – Navigation Officer
- Carmen Jones (1954) – Dink Franklin
- Flame of the Islands (1956) – Nick
- St. Louis Blues (1958) – Drunk (uncredited)
- Tarzan's Fight for Life (1958) – Molo (uncredited)
- It's a Mad, Mad, Mad, Mad World (1963) – migrant truck driver
- Silver Streak (1976) – Shoeshiner
- Hollywood Shuffle (1987) – Cookie's Father (final film role)
