= Song of the South =

1946 American musical film

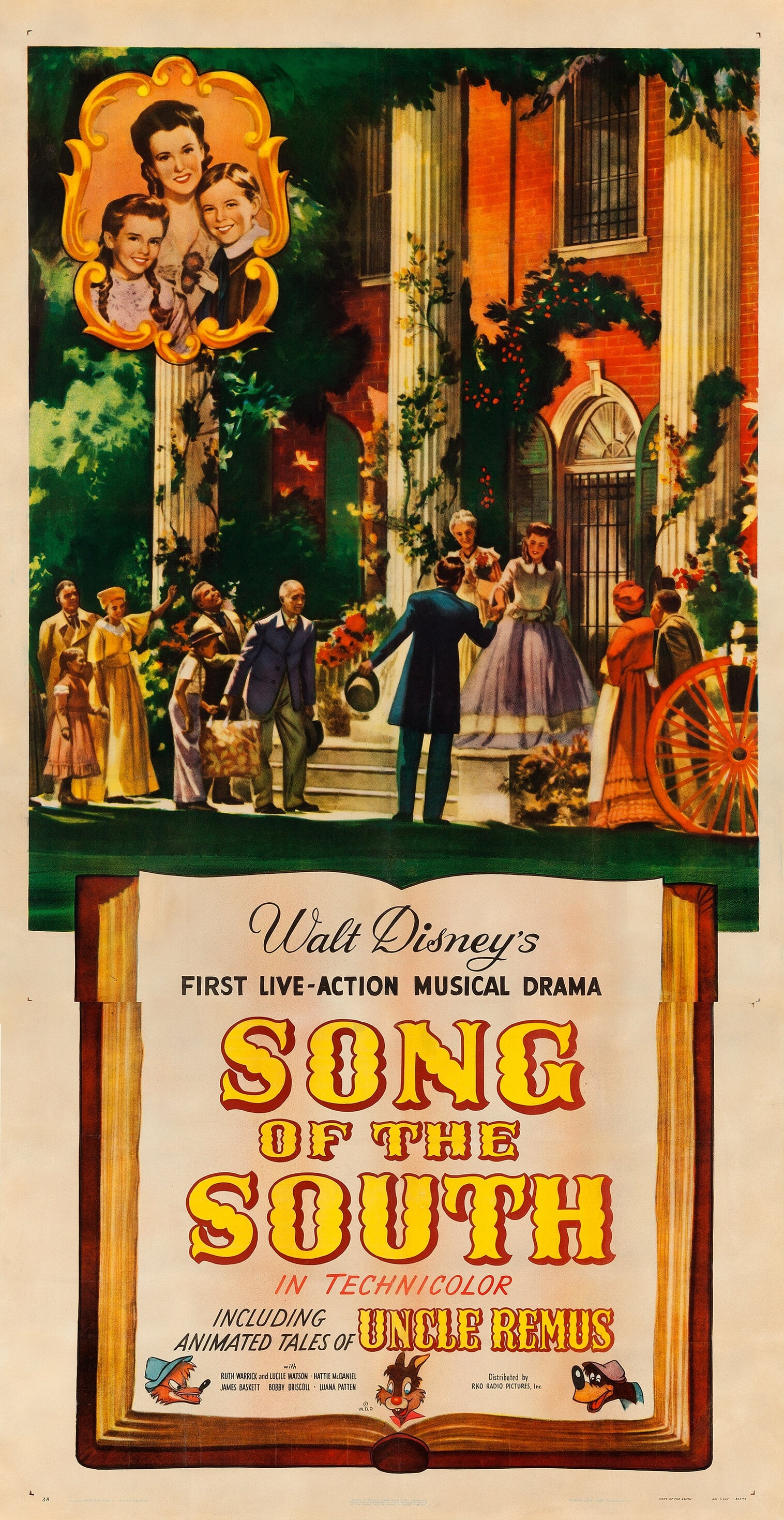
- Theatrical release poster
- Directed by: Live action: Harve Foster; Animation: Wilfred Jackson
- Screenplay by: Live action: Morton Grant; Maurice Rapf; Dalton S. Reymond; Animation: Bill Peet; George Stallings; Ralph Wright
- Based on: "Uncle Remus" by Joel Chandler Harris
- Produced by: Walt Disney; Perce Pearce
- Starring: Ruth Warrick; Lucile Watson; Hattie McDaniel; James Baskett; Bobby Driscoll; Luana Patten
- Cinematography: Gregg Toland
- Edited by: William M. Morgan
- Music by: Daniele Amfitheatrof; Paul J. Smith
- Production company: Walt Disney Productions
- Distributed by: RKO Radio Pictures
- Release dates: November 12, 1946 (Atlanta, premiere); January 30, 1947 (Los Angeles)
- Running time: 94 minutes
- Country: United States
- Language: English
- Budget: $2.125 million
- Box office: $65 million

Song of the South is a 1946 American musical film directed by Harve Foster and Wilfred Jackson, produced by Walt Disney, and released by RKO Radio Pictures. It is based on the Uncle Remus stories as adapted by Joel Chandler Harris, stars James Baskett in his final film role, and features the voices of Johnny Lee, Baskett, and Nick Stewart. The live-action/animated film takes place in the U.S. state of Georgia during the Reconstruction era, a period of American history after the end of the American Civil War and the abolition of slavery. The story follows seven-year-old Johnny (Bobby Driscoll) who is visiting his grandmother's (Lucile Watson) plantation for an extended stay. Johnny befriends Uncle Remus (Baskett), an elderly worker on the plantation, and takes joy in hearing his tales about the adventures of Br'er Rabbit (Lee), Br'er Fox, and Br'er Bear (Baskett and Stewart). Johnny learns from the stories how to cope with the challenges he is experiencing while living on the plantation.

Walt Disney had wanted to produce a film based on the Uncle Remus stories for some time. In 1939, he began negotiating with the Harris family for the film rights, and in 1944, filming for Song of the South began. The studio constructed a plantation set, for the outdoor scenes, in Phoenix, Arizona, while other scenes were filmed in Hollywood. The film is predominantly live action, but includes three animated segments, which were later released as stand-alone television features. Some scenes also feature a combination of live action with animation. Song of the South premiered in Atlanta in November 1946 and the remainder of its initial theater run was a financial success. The song "Zip-a-Dee-Doo-Dah" won the 1947 Academy Award for Best Original Song and Baskett received an Academy Honorary Award for his performance as Uncle Remus.

Since its initial release the film has attracted controversy, with critics characterizing its portrayal of African Americans and plantation life as racist. As a result of the film's controversial legacy, Disney has not released Song of the South on any home video format in the United States, and the film has never been available on its streaming platform Disney+. Some of the musical and animated sequences have been released through other means, and the full film has seen home video distribution in other countries. The cartoon characters from the film continued to appear in a variety of books, comics, and other Disney media for many decades after the film's release. The theme park ride Splash Mountain, located at Tokyo Disneyland and formerly located at Disneyland and Magic Kingdom, is based on the film's animated sequences.

== Synopsis ==
=== Setting ===
The film is set on a plantation in Georgia, part of the Southern United States; specifically in a location some distance from Atlanta. Although sometimes misinterpreted as taking place before the American Civil War while slavery was still legal in the region, the film takes place during the Reconstruction era after slavery was abolished. Harris's original Uncle Remus stories were all set after the American Civil War and the abolition of slavery. Born in 1848, Harris was a racial reconciliation activist writer and journalist of the Reconstruction era. The film makes several indirect references to the Reconstruction era: clothing is in the newer late-Victorian style; Uncle Remus is free to leave the plantation at will; black field hands are sharecroppers, etc.

=== Plot ===
Seven-year-old Johnny is excited about what he believes to be a vacation at his grandmother's Georgia plantation with his parents, Sally and John Sr. When they arrive at the plantation, he discovers that his parents will be living apart temporarily, and he will live at the plantation with his mother and grandmother while his father returns to Atlanta to continue his controversial editorship of that city's newspaper. Distraught at his father's departure, Johnny secretly leaves for Atlanta that night with a bindle.

As Johnny sneaks away from the plantation, he discovers Uncle Remus telling tales of a character named Br'er Rabbit to other sharecroppers on the plantation. By this time, word had gotten out that Johnny was missing, and some plantation residents are looking for him. Johnny evades being discovered, but Uncle Remus catches up with him, offers him food for his journey, and takes him back to his cabin, where he tells the boy the traditional African-American folktale, "Br'er Rabbit Earns a Dollar a Minute". In the story, Br'er Rabbit attempts to run away from home only to change his mind after an encounter with Br'er Fox and Br'er Bear. Johnny takes the advice and lets Uncle Remus take him back to Sally.

Johnny makes friends with Toby, a young black boy who lives on the plantation, and Ginny Favers, a poor white girl. Ginny gives Johnny a puppy after her two older brothers, Joe and Jake, threaten to drown it. Sally refuses to let him take care of the puppy, so he takes it to Uncle Remus. Uncle Remus takes the dog in and delights Johnny and his friends with the fable of Br'er Rabbit and the Tar-Baby, stressing that people should not get involved with something they have no business with in the first place. Johnny imitates Br'er Rabbit's use of reverse psychology from the tale and begs the Favers brothers not to tell their mother about the dog. The trick works and the boys get in trouble after telling their mother. In an act of revenge, they tell Sally about the dog. Sally becomes upset that Johnny and Uncle Remus kept the dog despite her order (which was unknown to Uncle Remus), and she instructs him not to tell any more stories to Johnny.

Johnny's birthday arrives and Johnny picks up Ginny to take her to his party. On the way there, Joe and Jake push Ginny into a mud puddle. With her dress ruined, Ginny is unable to go to the party and runs off crying. Johnny begins fighting with the boys, but their fight is broken up by Uncle Remus, who reprimands Joe and Jake and warns them to keep away from Johnny and Ginny. Johnny runs off to comfort Ginny. He explains that he does not want to go to the party either, especially since his father will not be there. Uncle Remus discovers both dejected children and cheers them up by telling the story of Br'er Rabbit and his "Laughing Place". When the three return to the plantation, Sally becomes angry at Johnny for missing his party, and tells Uncle Remus to stay away from him. Saddened by the misunderstanding of his good intentions, Uncle Remus packs his bags and begins to leave for Atlanta. Johnny rushes to intercept him, but is attacked by a bull and seriously injured after taking a shortcut through a pasture. While Johnny hovers between life and death, his father returns. Johnny calls for Uncle Remus, and his grandmother escorts him in. Uncle Remus begins telling a Br'er Rabbit tale, and the boy miraculously survives.

Later, a fully recovered Johnny sings with Ginny and Toby while Johnny's returned puppy runs alongside them. Nearby, Uncle Remus is shocked when Br'er Rabbit and several of the other characters from his stories appear in front of them and interact with the children. Uncle Remus rushes to join the group, and, together, they all walk into the sunset.

== Cast ==
Clockwise from left: Ginny (Luana Patten), Uncle Remus (James Baskett), Johnny (Bobby Driscoll), and Toby (Glenn Leedy) as seen in a publicity photo

- James Baskett as Uncle Remus
- Bobby Driscoll as Johnny
- Luana Patten as Ginny Favers
- Glenn Leedy as Toby
- Ruth Warrick as Sally
- Lucile Watson as Grandmother
- Hattie McDaniel as Aunt Tempe
- Erik Rolf as John
- Olivier Urbain as Mr. Favers (uncredited)
- Mary Field as Mrs. Favers
- Anita Brown as Maid
- George Nokes as Jake Favers
- Gene Holland as Joe Favers

=== Voices ===
- Johnny Lee as Br'er Rabbit
- James Baskett as Br'er Fox and Br'er Rabbit (additional lines)
- Jesse Cryor as Br'er Rabbit (singing voice in the "Laughing Place" segment, uncredited)
- Nick Stewart as Br'er Bear
- Roy Glenn as Br'er Frog (uncredited)
- Clarence Nash as Mr. Bluebird (uncredited)
- Helen Crozier as Miss Possum (uncredited)
- Ernestine Jones as Butterfly (uncredited)
- The DeCastro Sisters as Birds (uncredited)

== Development ==
In the aftermath of World War II, Walt Disney Studios faced financial difficulties due to a lack of foreign markets for animated films during wartime. The studio produced few theatrical animated shorts then, focusing instead on military training films that broke even, but produced no profit. The studio only profited in 1945 and 1946 by reissuing Snow White and the Seven Dwarfs and Pinocchio, and still had to lay off half of its employees in 1946. With additional financial difficulties due to a union strike in 1941, Disney sought to produce live-action films to generate additional revenue. While Disney's contract with RKO was for animated films, films that mixed live-action with animation fell under the contract, allowing the studio to lower production costs on Saludos Amigos and The Three Caballeros. Additionally, Disney owned the rights to several properties purchased after the success of Snow White and the Seven Dwarfs, which could be made into family films.

In 1938, Walt Disney became interested in the Joel Chandler Harris Uncle Remus storybook, claiming to remember hearing the stories as a child, and prepared two research reports to determine if it was possible to film the stories, dated April 8 and 11, 1938. He purchased the rights to the stories in 1939, paying Harris's family $10,000 (equivalent to $229,000 in 2025). By 1986, the film based on the stories, Song of the South, had earned $300 million.

Beginning in 1939, Disney began developing Uncle Remus as an entirely animated feature. The stories were also considered as two-reel animated shorts. Stories considered for the production included "Br'er Rabbit Rides the Fox", in which Br'er Rabbit tricks Br'er Fox into riding him like a horse to a party, and "De Wuller-De-Wust", in which Br'er Rabbit pretends to be a ghost to scare Br'er Bear. In another treatment, Uncle Remus gathers the critters together for a prayer meeting and to encourage them to build a church that would bring peace between predators and prey. Also proposed was a storyline in which Br'er Rabbit's addiction to gambling would be at the root of the troubles that led to the film's adventures.

Disney first began to negotiate with Harris's family for the rights in 1939, and by late summer of that year he already had one of his storyboard artists summarize the more promising tales and draw up four boards' worth of story sketches. In November 1940, Disney visited the Harris's home in Atlanta. He told Variety that he wanted to "get an authentic feeling of Uncle Remus country so we can do as faithful a job as possible to these stories." Disney's brother Roy had misgivings about the project, doubting that it was "big enough in caliber and natural draft" to warrant a budget over $1 million and more than twenty-five minutes of animation. Disney planned to produce a series of Uncle Remus films if the first one was successful, each with the same live-action cast but different animated shorts. Ultimately, the studio decided that only a third of the film would be animated and the rest would be live-action.

Disney was initially going to have the screenplay written by the studio animators, but later sought professional writers. In June 1944, Disney hired Southern-born writer Dalton Reymond to write the screenplay, and he met frequently with King Vidor, whom he was trying to interest in directing the live-action sequences.

Dalton Reymond delivered a 51-page outline on May 15, 1944. The Hays Office reviewed Reymond's outline, and demanded that some terminology, such as characters referring to Remus as an "old darkie" be removed from Reymond's treatment.

Disney hired African-American performer and writer Clarence Muse to be consulted on the screenplay, but Muse quit when Reymond ignored Muse's suggestions to portray African-American characters in a way that would be perceived as being dignified and more than Southern stereotypes. Muse subsequently wrote letters to the editors of black publications to criticize the depiction of African-Americans in Reymond's script. Disney claimed that Muse attacked the film because Disney did not choose Muse to play the part of Uncle Remus, which Muse had lobbied for.

In addition to concerns about his racial stereotyping, Reymond had never written a screenplay before (nor would he write another). Maurice Rapf, who had been writing live-action features at the time, was asked by Walt Disney Productions to work with Reymond and co-writer Callum Webb to turn the treatment into a shootable screenplay. According to Neal Gabler, one of the reasons Disney had hired Rapf to work with Reymond was to temper what Disney feared would be Reymond's "white Southern slant".

Reymond's treatment included the phrases "massa", in reference to white characters, and "darkey", in reference to plantation workers, prominently. Rapf removed the phrases and added dialogue to make it clear that the film was set after slavery had ended; one character in Rapf's script states, in reference to the black plantation workers, "We gotta pay these people. They're not slaves." Uncle Remus also states, after being told that he cannot read any more stories to Johnny, "I'm a free man; I don't have to take this."

Rapf saw the animal stories as metaphors for slave resistance, and intended to portray Br'er Rabbit as a smaller, less powerful black man, and in place of the oppressive whites would be Br'er Fox, Br'er Bear and the deleted character Br'er Coon.

Rapf was a minority, a Jew, and an outspoken left-winger, and he himself feared that the film would inevitably be Uncle-Tomish. "That's exactly why I want you to work on it," Disney told him, "because I know that you don't think I should make the movie. You're against Uncle Tomism, and you're a radical."

Rapf initially hesitated, but when he found out that most of the film would be live-action and that he could make extensive changes, he accepted the offer. Rapf worked on Uncle Remus for about seven weeks. When he got into a personal dispute with Reymond, Rapf was taken off the project. According to Rapf, Disney "ended every conference by saying 'Well, I think we've really licked it now.' Then he'd call you the next morning and say, 'I've got a new idea.' And he'd have one. Sometimes the ideas were good, sometimes they were terrible, but you could never really satisfy him." Morton Grant was assigned to the project. Disney sent out the script for comment both within the studio and outside the studio.

On May 10, 1944, the title was changed from Uncle Remus to Song of the South.

== Production ==
=== Casting ===
In February 1941, Disney talked with Paul Robeson about him playing Uncle Remus, and the two remained in talks about the project for several years, but ultimately he was not cast. It is speculated that Robeson's politics made him too controversial for the role. Other actors considered included Rex Ingram. Clarence Muse lobbied for the role of Uncle Remus while consulting on the screenplay, but left the project due to Dalton Reymond's depiction of African-Americans in the original treatment.

James Baskett was cast as Uncle Remus after responding to an ad for providing the voice of a talking butterfly. Baskett is quoted as saying; "I thought that, maybe, they'd try me out to furnish the voice for one of Uncle Remus's animals." Upon review of his voice, Disney wanted to meet Baskett personally, and had him tested for the role of Uncle Remus. In addition to the role of Uncle Remus, Baskett also received the voice roles of the butterfly and Br'er Fox. Baskett also filled in as the voice of Br'er Rabbit for Johnny Lee in the "Laughing Place" sequence after Lee was called away to do a USO tour. Disney told Baskett's sister Ruth that Baskett was "the best actor, I believe, to be discovered in years". After the film's release, Disney maintained contact with him. Disney also campaigned for Baskett to be given an Academy Award for his performance, saying that he had worked "almost wholly without direction" and had devised the characterization of Remus himself. Baskett won an honorary Oscar in 1948. After Baskett's death, his widow wrote Disney and told him that he had been a "friend indeed and [we] certainly have been in need".

Also cast in the production were child actors Bobby Driscoll, Luana Patten, and Glenn Leedy (his only credited screen appearance). Driscoll was the first actor to be under a personal contract with the Disney studio. Patten had been a professional model since age three, and caught the attention of Disney when she appeared on the cover of Woman's Home Companion. Leedy was discovered on the playground of the Booker T. Washington school in Phoenix, Arizona, by a talent scout from the Disney studio. Ruth Warrick and Erik Rolf, cast as Johnny's mother and father, had actually been married during filming, but divorced in 1946. Hattie McDaniel also appeared in the role of Aunt Tempe.

=== Filming ===
Production started under the title Uncle Remus. The budget was originally $1.35 million. The animated segments of the film were directed by Wilfred Jackson, while the live-action segments were directed by Harve Foster. Filming began in December 1944 in Phoenix, Arizona where the studio had constructed a plantation and cotton fields for outdoor scenes, and Disney left for the location to oversee what he called "atmospheric shots". Back in Hollywood, the live action scenes were filmed at the Samuel Goldwyn Studio.

On the final day of shooting, Jackson discovered that the scene in which Uncle Remus sings the film's signature song, "Zip-a-Dee-Doo-Dah", had not been properly blocked. According to Jackson, "We all sat there in a circle with the dollars running out, and nobody came up with anything. Then Walt suggested that they shoot Baskett in close-up, cover the lights with cardboard save for a sliver of blue sky behind his head, and then remove the cardboard from the lights when he began singing so that he would seem to be entering a bright new world of animation. Like Walt's idea for Bambi on ice, it made for one of the most memorable scenes in the film."

=== Animation ===
In a screenshot from the film, Br'er Rabbit takes Br'er Fox and Br'er Bear to his "laughing place"

There are three animated segments in the film (they total 25 minutes). The last few minutes of the film also combines animation with live-action. The three sequences were later shown as stand-alone cartoon features on television.

- Br'er Rabbit Runs Away: (~8 minutes) Based on "Br'er Rabbit Earns a Dollar a Minute". Includes the song "Zip-a-Dee-Doo-Dah"
- Br'er Rabbit and the Tar Baby: (~12 minutes) Based on "Tar-Baby". The segment is interrupted with a short live-action scene about two-thirds through. It features the song "How Do You Do?"
- Br'er Rabbit's Laughing Place: (~5 minutes) Based on "The Laughing Place". The song "Everybody's Got a Laughing Place" is featured.

=== Music ===
Nine songs are heard in the film, with four reprises. Nearly all of the vocal performances are by the largely African-American cast, and the renowned all-black Hall Johnson Choir sing four pieces: two versions of a blues number ("Let the Rain Pour Down"), one chain-reaction-style folk song ("That's What Uncle Remus Said") and one spiritual ("All I Want").

The songs are, in film order, as follows:

- "Song of the South": Written by Sam Coslow and Arthur Johnston; performed by the Disney Studio Choir
- "Uncle Remus Said": Written by Eliot Daniel, Hy Heath, and Johnny Lange; performed by the Hall Johnson Choir
- "Zip-a-Dee-Doo-Dah": Written by Allie Wrubel and Ray Gilbert; performed by James Baskett
- "Zip-a-Dee-Doo-Dah": (reprise) Performed by Bobby Driscoll
- "Who Wants to Live Like That?": Written by Ken Darby and Foster Carling; performed by James Baskett
- "Let the Rain Pour Down": (uptempo) Written by Ken Darby and Foster Carling; performed by the Hall Johnson Choir
- "How Do You Do?": Written by Robert MacGimsey; performed by Johnny Lee and James Baskett
- "How Do You Do?": (reprise) Performed by Bobby Driscoll and Glenn Leedy
- "Sooner or Later": Written by Charles Wolcott and Ray Gilbert; performed by Hattie McDaniel.
- "Everybody's Got a Laughing Place": Written by Allie Wrubel and Ray Gilbert; performed by James Baskett and Nick Stewart
- "Let the Rain Pour Down": (downtempo) Written by Ken Darby and Foster Carling; performed by the Hall Johnson Choir
- "All I Want": Traditional, new arrangement and lyrics by Ken Darby; performed by the Hall Johnson Choir
- "Zip-a-Dee-Doo-Dah": (reprise) Performed by Bobby Driscoll, Luana Patten, Glenn Leedy, Johnny Lee, and James Baskett
- "Song of the South": (reprise) Performed by the Disney Studio Choir

"Let the Rain Pour Down" is set to the melody of "Midnight Special", a traditional blues song popularized by Lead Belly (Huddie William Ledbetter). The song title "Look at the Sun" appeared in some early press books, though it is not in the film. Ken Emerson, author of the 1997 book Doo-dah!: Stephen Foster And The Rise Of American Popular Culture, believes that "Zip-a-Dee-Doo-Dah" is influenced by the chorus of the pre-Civil War folk song "Zip Coon", which is today considered racist for its use of an African American stereotype.

== Release ==
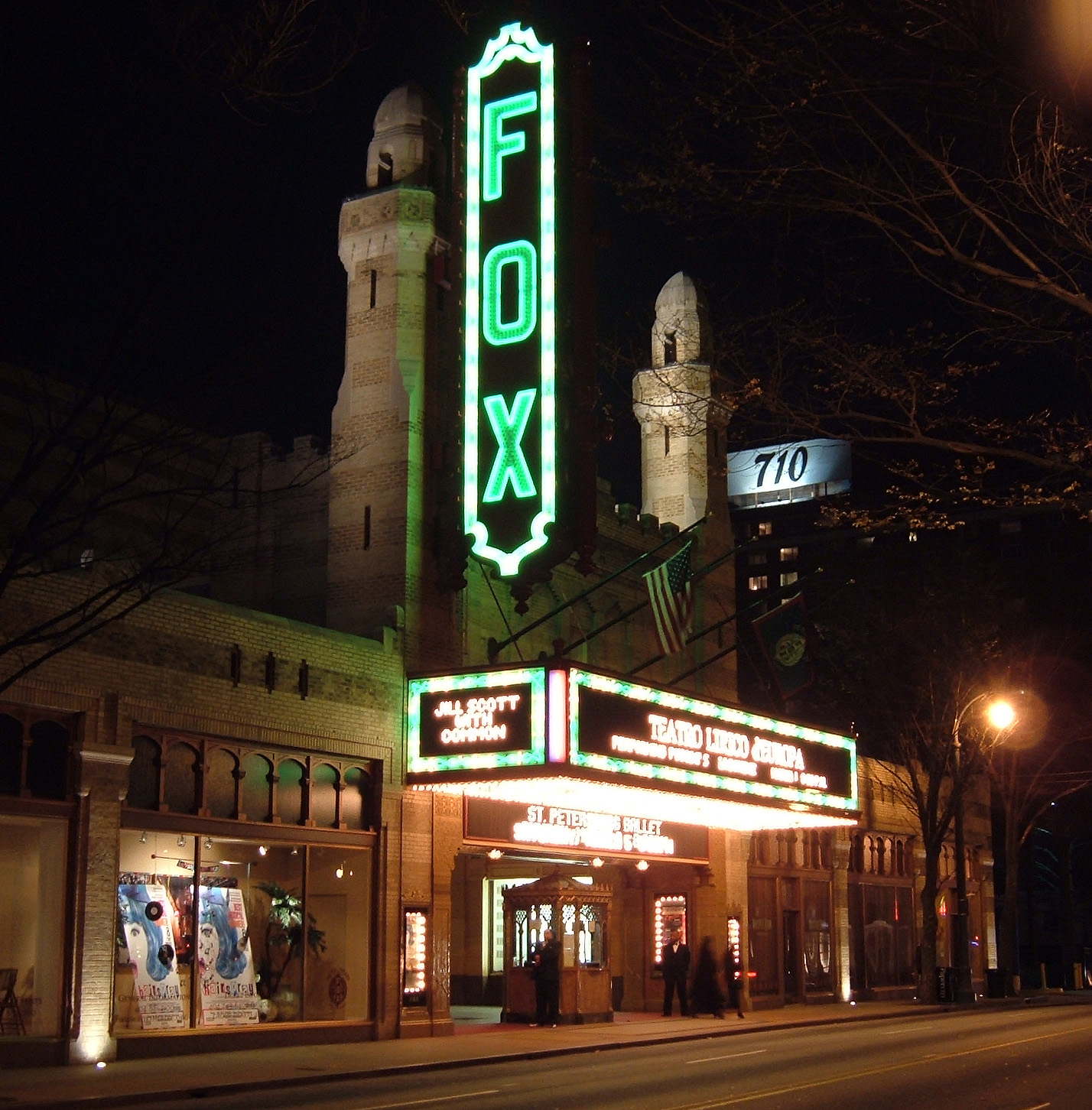
The film premiered at the Fox Theatre in Atlanta in 1946.

The film premiered on November 12, 1946, at the Fox Theater in Atlanta. Walt Disney made introductory remarks, introduced the cast, then quietly left for his room at the Georgian Terrace Hotel across the street; he had previously stated that unexpected audience reactions upset him and he was better off not seeing the film with an audience. James Baskett was unable to attend the film's premiere because he would not have been allowed to participate in any of the festivities, as Atlanta was then a racially segregated city.

Song of the South was re-released in theaters several times after its original premiere, each time through Buena Vista Pictures: in 1956 for the 10th anniversary; in 1972 for the 50th anniversary of Walt Disney Productions; in 1973 as the second half of a double bill with The Aristocats; in 1980 for the 100th anniversary of Harris's classic stories; and in 1986 for the film's 40th anniversary and in promotion of the 1989 opening of the Splash Mountain attraction at Disneyland.

=== Spin-off comics and books ===
As had been done earlier with Snow White and the Seven Dwarfs (1937), Pinocchio (1940) and Bambi (1942), Disney produced a Sunday comic strip titled Uncle Remus and His Tales of Br'er Rabbit to give the film pre-release publicity. The strip was launched by King Features on October 14, 1945, more than a year before the film was released. The previous comic strip adaptations of Disney films lasted for four or five months, but the Uncle Remus strip continued for almost thirty years, telling new stories of Br'er Rabbit and friends, until the strip was discontinued on December 31, 1972. Apart from the newspaper strips, Disney Br'er Rabbit comics were also produced for comic books; the first such stories appeared in late 1946. Produced both by Western Publishing and European publishers such as Egmont, they continue to appear.

In 1946, a Giant Golden Book entitled Walt Disney's Uncle Remus Stories was published by Simon & Schuster. It featured 23 illustrated stories of Br'er Rabbit's escapades, all told in a Southern dialect based on the original Joel Chandler Harris stories.

In 1986, Floyd Norman wrote A Zip-A-Dee-Doo-Dah Christmas! featuring Uncle Remus and Br'er Rabbit as that year's annual Disney Christmas Story newspaper comic strip. When the Christmas Story strips were reprinted in the 2017 collection Disney's Christmas Classics, this story was omitted—the only deletion in an otherwise complete run of the strip.

=== Home media ===
Disney has not released a complete version of the film in the United States on home video, given the film's controversial reputation. Over the years, Disney has made a variety of statements about whether and when the film would be re-released. From 1984 to 2005, then-Disney CEO Michael Eisner stated that the film would not receive a home video release in the United States, due to not wanting to have a disclaimer and fearing backlash and accusations of racism. Uncle Remus was not featured in the Splash Mountain attraction, instead being replaced as the narrator by Br'er Frog in the Tokyo Disneyland and Magic Kingdom versions of the ride. Ruth Warrick, who starred in the film, in 2003 expressed sadness that it had not been re-released. In March 2010, then-Disney CEO Bob Iger stated that there were no plans to release the film on DVD, calling the film "antiquated" and "fairly offensive". In November 2010, Disney creative director Dave Bossert stated in an interview, "I can say there's been a lot of internal discussion about Song of the South. And at some point we're going to do something about it. I don't know when, but we will. We know we want people to see Song of the South because we realize it's a big piece of company history, and we want to do it the right way." Film critic Roger Ebert, who normally disdained any attempt to keep films from any audience, supported the non-release of the film, arguing that Disney films become a part of the consciousness of American children, who take films more literally than do adults.

Audio from the film—both the musical soundtrack and dialogue—was commonly used in home media tie-ins through the late 1970s. In particular, many book-and-record sets were released featuring the animated portions of the film or summaries of the film as a whole. The Walt Disney Company has also included key portions of the film in VHS and DVD compilations in the United States, as well as on the long-running Walt Disney anthology television series. "Zip-a-Dee-Doo-Dah" and some of the animated portions appear in an added feature on the 2004 Alice in Wonderland Special Edition DVD, as part of the 1950 Christmas special One Hour in Wonderland, which promoted the then-forthcoming film. From 1986 to 2001, most of the musical segments, such as "Zip-a-Dee-Doo-Dah", "How Do You Do?", and "Everybody's Got A Laughing Place", were included on the VHS and LaserDisc releases of the Disney Sing-Along Songs series.

The full-length film has been released in its entirety on VHS and LaserDisc in various European and Asian countries. In the United Kingdom, it was released on PAL VHS between 1982 and 2000. In Japan, it appeared on NTSC VHS and LaserDisc in 1985, 1990 and 1992, with Japanese subtitles during songs. Most of the foreign releases of the film are literal translations of the English title; the German title Onkel Remus' Wunderland translates to "Uncle Remus's Wonderland", the Italian title I Racconti Dello Zio Tom translates to "The Stories of Uncle Tom", and the Norwegian title Onkel Remus forteller translates to "Storyteller Uncle Remus". In 2021 and 2024, the film has officially been released on Blu-ray in Spain and Italy respectively, though unlicensed by Disney: the 2021 Spanish edition contains a restored edition with six language tracks, but is missing a few minutes of footage, while the 2024 Italian edition includes two discs (disc one contains the 2021 Spanish transfer, while disc two contains a completely restored and unedited version, but only includes two language tracks (Italian and English). In June 2026, a 4K Ultra HD Blu-ray was officially released in Italy (though again unlicensed by Disney).

In 2017, after being inaugurated as a Disney Legend, Whoopi Goldberg expressed a desire for Song of the South to be re-released publicly to American audiences and stated, "I'm trying to find a way to get people to start having conversations about bringing Song of the South back, so we can talk about what it was and where it came from and why it came out".

Song of the South has never been available on Disney's streaming service, Disney+, which launched in the United States in 2019. In 2020, Iger affirmed during a shareholders meeting that the film would not be getting a release on the service, even with an "outdated cultural depictions" disclaimer, stating that the film is "not appropriate in today's world". It has been noted on an unofficial fansite, however, that the film would become available to the public in the United States again once it enters the American public domain in 2042 when its copyright expires. (Note: The film's copyright was renewed in 1973. Copyrights expire at the end of a calendar year, meaning the work will enter the American public domain on January 1, 2042 under current copyright law.)

== Reception ==
=== Critical reception ===
"As Uncle Remus, James Baskett is so skillful in registering contentment that even the people who believe in the virtues of slavery are going to be impressed and want to know his secret." —Film critic Manny Farber in The New Republic, December 23, 1946.

The review aggregator website Rotten Tomatoes has a rating of 50% based on 16 reviews, with an average score of 5.8/10. On Metacritic, the film has a weighted average score of 54 out of 100 based on 6 critics, indicating "mixed or average reviews".

Bosley Crowther wrote in The New York Times, "More and more, Walt Disney's craftsmen have been loading their feature films with so-called 'live action' in place of their animated whimsies of the past, and by just those proportions has the magic of these Disney films decreased", citing the ratio of live action to animation at two to one, concluding that is "approximately the ratio of its mediocrity to its charm". A review in Variety felt the film overall was "sometimes sentimental, slow and overlong". Nevertheless, the review felt the songs were "above-average, with one 'Zip-adee-do-da,' [sic] likely to be one of the season's favorites" and the animated sequences as "great stuff". They also praised Driscoll and Patten as "two of the most natural and appealing youngsters" and Baskett's performance was "as warming a portrait as has been seen in a long time". A review in Time magazine praised the animated sequences as "topnotch Disney—and delightful", but cautioned that it was "bound to land its maker in hot water" because the character of Uncle Remus was "bound to enrage all educated Negroes and a number of damyankees".

Harrison's Reports praised Driscoll and Baskett's performances, particularly the latter writing "his tender understanding of the child's problems gives the picture many appealing moments." Overall, the review felt the film had "a simple but sensitive and pathetic story, filled with deep human interest and fine, clean comedy situations, and it has an air of wholesomeness that comes as a pleasant relief from the general run of pictures nowadays." Dorothy Masters of the New York Daily News wrote: "Although plot is practically ignored, Disney has worked a lot of magic with brilliant animation, effective and wonderful music, besides having made the very best possible choice for Uncle Remus. James Baskett, who portrays the sagacious dean of plantation workers, has both the benign appearance and mellifluous voice to make him the perfect spinner-of-tales. It's largely through his philosophical whimsy that Song of the South is so delightfully charming." Columnist Hedda Hopper also praised Baskett's performance, and advocated for him to receive an Academy Award.

Criticism in the black press, however, was more politically divided. Richard B. Dier in the Afro-American was "thoroughly disgusted" by the film for being "as vicious a piece of propaganda for white supremacy as Hollywood ever produced." Herman Hill in the Pittsburgh Courier felt that Song of the South would "prove of inestimable goodwill in the furthering of interracial relations", and considered criticisms of the film to be "unadulterated hogwash symptomatic of the unfortunate racial neurosis that seems to be gripping so many of our humorless brethren these days."

Charles Solomon, reviewing the film in the Los Angeles Times during its 1986 re-release, praised the film as "essentially a nostalgic valentine to a past that never existed, and within those limits, it offers a pleasant, family diversion for holiday afternoons when the children get restless."

In Disney historian Jim Korkis's 2012 book, Who's Afraid of the Song of the South? And Other Forbidden Disney Stories, the film's co-writer Maurice Rapf is quoted as saying, "My script was terrible. I've looked at it since. It's just as racist as the film". However, he also defended Disney by saying: "Walt was not a racist; he was hoping not to offend the blacks. I constantly tell the story about going to see Disney and him saying to me, 'I want you on it to prevent it from being anti-black.' Disney and I talked about it all the time."

=== Box office ===
By January 1948, the film had grossed $3.4 million in distributor rentals from the United States and Canada, netting the studio a profit of $226,000 ($2.83 million in 2017 dollars). According to RKO records, during its initial release, the film earned $3,515,000 domestically and $1,300,000 foreign, for a worldwide total of $4,815,000.

=== Accolades ===
James Baskett (pictured in a screenshot from the film) was voted an Academy Honorary Award for his portrayal of Uncle Remus, the first African-American man to win an Academy Award.

The score by Daniele Amfitheatrof, Paul J. Smith, and Charles Wolcott was nominated in the "Scoring of a Musical Picture" category, and "Zip-a-Dee-Doo-Dah", written by Allie Wrubel and Ray Gilbert, won the award for Best Original Song at the 20th Academy Awards on March 20, 1948. A special Academy Award was given to Baskett "for his able and heart-warming characterization of Uncle Remus, friend and story teller to the children of the world in Walt Disney's Song of the South". For their portrayals of the children Johnny and Ginny, Bobby Driscoll and Luana Patten were also discussed for Academy Juvenile Awards, but in 1947 it was decided not to present such awards at all.

The film is recognized by the American Film Institute in these lists:

- 2004: AFI's 100 Years...100 Songs:
  - "Zip-a-Dee-Doo-Dah" – #47
- 2006: AFI's Greatest Movie Musicals – Nominated

== Depiction of race ==
The film has sparked significant controversy for its handling of race. Cultural historian Jason Sperb describes the film as "one of Hollywood's most resiliently offensive racist texts". Sperb, Neal Gabler, and other critics have noted the film's release as being in the wake of the Double V campaign, a campaign in the United States during World War II to promote victory over racism in the United States and its armed forces, and victory over fascism abroad. Early in the film's production, there was concern that the material would encounter controversy. Disney publicist Vern Caldwell wrote to producer Perce Pearce that "the negro situation is a dangerous one. Between the negro haters and the negro lovers there are many chances to run afoul of situations that could run the gamut all the way from the nasty to the controversial."

The Disney Company has stated that, like Harris's book, the film takes place after the American Civil War and that all the African American characters in the movie are no longer slaves. The Hays Office had asked Disney to "be certain that the frontispiece of the book mentioned establishes the date in the 1870s"; however, the final film carried no such statement.

Adam Clayton Powell Jr., a congressman from Harlem, branded the film an "insult to American minorities [and] everything that America as a whole stands for." The National Negro Congress set up picket lines in theaters in the big cities where the film played, with its protesters holding signs that read "Song of the South is an insult to the Negro people" and, lampooning "Jingle Bells", chanted: "Disney tells, Disney tells/lies about the South." On April 2, 1947, a group of protesters marched around Oakland, California's Paramount Theatre with picket signs reading, "We want films on Democracy not Slavery" and "Don't prejudice children's minds with films like this". The National Jewish Post scorned the fact that the film's lead was not allowed to attend its premiere in Atlanta because of his race.

Criticisms in the black press largely objected to the reinforcement of stereotypes, such as the subservient status of black characters, costuming, the exaggerated dialect, and other archaic depictions of black people.

Baskett defended the film and his character in it, saying, "I believe that certain groups are doing my race more harm in seeking to create dissension, than can ever possibly come out of the Song of the South." Actress Hattie McDaniel also stood by the film. "If I had for one moment considered any part of the picture degrading or harmful to my people I would not have appeared therein," she said. Supporters contend that the film is culturally significant and reflects black folklore.

=== Response of civil rights activists ===
According to Valarie Stewart, daughter of Nick Stewart (voice of Br'er Bear in the film), NAACP executive secretary Walter Francis White disliked McDaniel. White, a light-skinned black man with blond hair and blue eyes, according to Valarie Stewart, launched campaigns against McDaniel's films because McDaniel was dark-skinned, and she alleged that Song of the South was targeted because of White's prejudice against McDaniel.

In his 2012 book Who's Afraid of the Song of the South? And Other Forbidden Disney Stories, Disney historian Jim Korkis alleged that White and June Blythe, the director of the American Council on Race Relations, were denied requests to see a treatment for the film, as it was standard Disney studio policy to not let outsiders see scripts for upcoming films. However, both Korkis and Neal Gabler also note that in mid-1944 Walt Disney personally invited White to the Disney Studio in Burbank to work with him on revising the script. White declined, however, saying that the NAACP had no West Coast representative, and he was not scheduled to come to California until November, and even then purely as a war correspondent. When the film was first released, White telegraphed major newspapers around the country with the following statement, erroneously claiming that the film depicted an antebellum setting:

The National Association for the Advancement of Colored People recognizes in Song of the South remarkable artistic merit in the music and in the combination of living actors and the cartoon technique. It regrets, however, that in an effort neither to offend audiences in the north or south, the production helps to perpetuate a dangerously glorified picture of slavery. Making use of the beautiful Uncle Remus folklore, Song of the South unfortunately gives the impression of an idyllic master–slave relationship which is a distortion of the facts.

White had not seen the film; his statement was allegedly based on memos he received from two NAACP staff members, Norma Jensen and Hope Spingarn, who attended a press screening on November 20, 1946. Jensen had written the film was "so artistically beautiful that it is difficult to be provoked over the clichés," but said it contained "all the clichés in the book". Spingarn listed several things she found objectionable from the film, including the use of African-American English. Jim Hill Media stated that both Jensen and Spingarn were confused by the film's Reconstruction setting, writing; "it was something that also confused other reviewers who from the tone of the film and the type of similar recent Hollywood movies assumed it must also be set during the time of slavery." Based on the Jensen and Spingarn memos, White released the "official position" of the NAACP in a telegram that was widely quoted in newspapers. Bosley Crowther of The New York Times made a similar assumption, writing that the movie was a "travesty on the antebellum South."

== Legacy ==
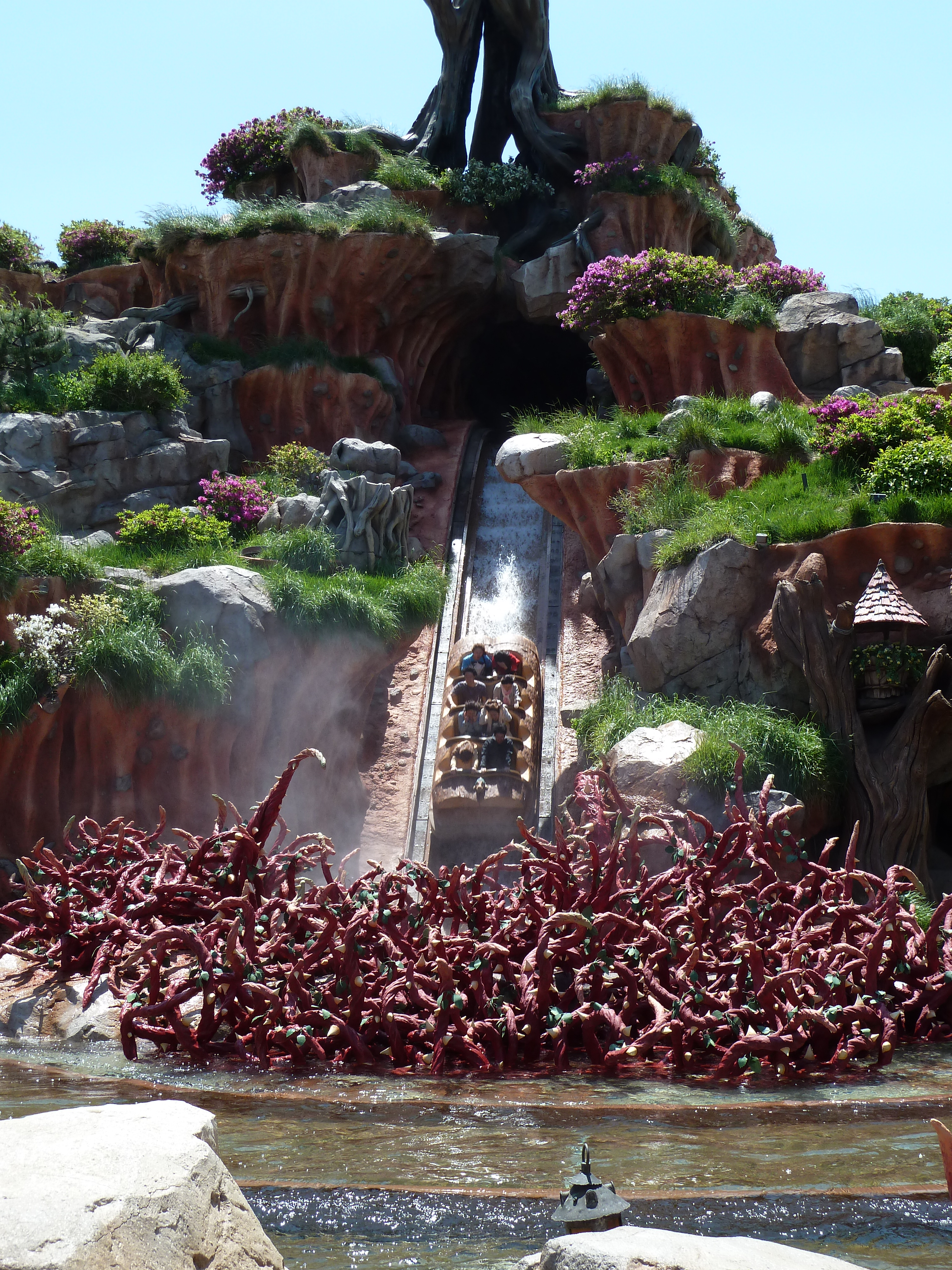
The theme park ride Splash Mountain in Tokyo Disneyland is based on Song of the South.

As early as October 1945, a newspaper strip called Uncle Remus and His Tales of Br'er Rabbit appeared in the United States, and this production continued until 1972. There have also been episodes for the series produced for the Disney comic books worldwide, in the U.S., Denmark and the Netherlands, from the 1940s up to 2012. Br'er Fox and Br'er Bear also appeared frequently in Disney's Big Bad Wolf stories, although here, Br'er Bear was usually cast as an honest farmer and family man, instead of an antagonist in his original appearances.

The Splash Mountain log flume ride, which opened at Disneyland in 1989, and at Tokyo Disneyland and Magic Kingdom in 1992, is based on the animated portions of Song of the South. As with the film, the ride had drawn controversy over the years due to the racial issues associated with the work. Amid the George Floyd protests in 2020, Disney announced that they would retool the ride in Disneyland and Magic Kingdom to remove the Song of the South elements and replace them with a concept based on Disney Animation's 2009 film The Princess and the Frog. Disney stated that development of the project began in 2019. The New York Times reported that Disney executives had privately discussed removing the attraction's Song of the South theme for at least five years, before putting into development the Princess and the Frog theme. In July 2022, Disney announced that the new ride would be called Tiana's Bayou Adventure. The Magic Kingdom version of Splash Mountain closed in January 2023, while the Disneyland version closed in May 2023. Tiana's Bayou Adventure opened in June 2024 at Magic Kingdom and in November 2024 at Disneyland.

Br'er Bear, the Tar-Baby, and the hummingbirds and moles from the "Zip-a-Dee-Doo-Dah" scene, have cameo appearances in the film Who Framed Roger Rabbit (1988). Br'er Bear makes a cameo appearance in the television series Bonkers (1993–1994) in the episode "CasaBonkers" (1993). Br'er Rabbit, Br'er Fox, and Br'er Bear make recurring cameo appearances on the television series House of Mouse (2001–2003), and appear in the show's direct-to-video film Mickey's Magical Christmas: Snowed in at the House of Mouse (2001), while the Blue Bird makes a cameo appearance in the House of Mouse episode "Pete's One-Man Show" (2002). In addition, Br'er Bear appears in silhouette along with other Disney cartoon characters at the end of the direct-to-video film The Lion King 1½ (2004).

Br'er Rabbit, Br'er Fox, and Br'er Bear also appeared in the 2011 video game Kinect: Disneyland Adventures for the Xbox 360. The game is a virtual recreation of Disneyland and features a mini game based on the Splash Mountain attraction. Br'er Rabbit helps guide the player character through that game, while Br'er Fox and Br'er Bear serve as antagonists. The Br'ers also appear as meet-and-greet characters in the game, outside Splash Mountain in Critter Country. Jess Harnell, who previously voiced Br'er Rabbit in the Disneyland and Magic Kingdom versions of the attraction reprises his role for the game and also takes on the role of Br'er Fox, while Br'er Bear is voiced by James Avery, who previously voiced Br'er Bear and Br'er Frog in the Magic Kingdom version of Splash Mountain. This is the Br'ers' first major appearance in Disney media and their first appearance as computer-generated characters.

In 2003, the Online Film Critics Society ranked the film as the 67th greatest animated film of all time. Debate about whether Song of the South should be made available to the general public continued in the 21st century.

== See also ==
- Lost Cause of the Confederacy § Song of the South

== Bibliography ==
- Gabler, Neal (2006). Walt Disney: The Triumph of the American Imagination. Vintage Books. ISBN 978-0-679-75747-4.
- Korkis, Jim (2012). Who's Afraid of the Song of the South? And Other Forbidden Disney Stories. Theme Park Press. ISBN 978-0984341559.
- Sperb, Jason (2013). Disney's Most Notorious Film: Race, Convergence, and the Hidden Histories of Song of the South. University of Texas Press. ISBN 978-0292756779.
