= Mauryne Brent =

American actress & poet (1921–2013)

- A young photo of Mauryne Brent
- Born: November 14, 1921
- Died: August 3, 2013 (aged 91); Las Vegas, Nevada, U.S.
- Occupations: Actress, poet
- Spouse: Leland Simmons Brent (d. 1943)

Mauryne Eleanor Taylor Brent (born Mauryne Eleanor Taylor; November 14, 1921 – August 3, 2013) was an American actress and poet. She starred opposite Mantan Moreland in the film Come On, Cowboy!. For her poetry, she was on the cover of Jet magazine on January 26, 1956. Jazz pianist Billy Taylor was her cousin and her half-sister Shirlee Taylor Haizlip included her in memoir The Sweeter the Juice; A Family Memoir. Her memoir, The Heart Speaks, was published in 1976.

Her father, Julian Augustus Taylor, was an evangelist preacher and an NAACP organizer. Her husband Leland Simmons Brent died November 8, 1943. She had three children.

She copyrighted a song she wrote the words to in 1964. It was one of at least three songs she wrote with music by Officus Delimus Jamison.

== Filmography ==
- Come On, Cowboy!
