= Dalton S. Reymond =

American screenwriter (1896–1978)

Dalton Shaffer Reymond (October 11, 1896 – January 23, 1978) was an American screenwriter, author, and college professor. He is perhaps best remembered as a screenwriter for the controversial Disney live-action/animated feature film Song of the South (1946).

== Early life and education ==
Reymond was born on October 11, 1896, in Baton Rouge, Louisiana.

== Career ==
Reymond worked as a theater and film studies professor at Louisiana State University, and later served as Dean of the College of Music. While there, he directed a production of Carmen which starred Frances Greer.

In the late 1930s, Reymond moved to Hollywood where he worked as a set designer, technical advisor, and dialect coach for various films depicting the American South. Reymond was a member of the Writers Guild of America.

In June 1944, Walt Disney Studios hired Reymond to write the screenplay of Song of the South because of his "knowledge of Southern traditions." Reymond delivered a 51-page outline of the screenplay on May 15, 1944.

The Hays Office reviewed Reymond's outline of Song of the South, and demanded that some terminology, such as characters referring to Remus as an "old darkie" be removed from Reymond's treatment. Reymond's depiction of African Americans in the original treatment of the screenplay was considered controversial at the time and caused multiple crew members and potential actors to pull out of involvement.

In the 1945 film Saratoga Trunk, Reymond was the vocal and singing coach to Ingrid Bergman.

In 1948, Reymond's first novel, "Earthbound," was published by Ziff Davis. The story depicted the Mississippi Delta of the 1880s.

== Death ==
Reymond died on January 23, 1978, in Camarillo, California.

== Filmography ==
- They Won't Forget (technical supervisor) – 1937
- Jezebel (speech supervisor) – 1938
- The Toy Wife (advisor; uncredited) – 1938
- The Little Foxes (technical advisor) – 1941
- Saratoga Trunk (technical advisor) – 1945
- Song of the South (screenwriter) – 1946

== Works ==
- Reymond, Dalton S. Earthbound. United Kingdom: Ziff-Davis Publishing Company, 1948.
