= Come on, Cowboy! =

1948 film

Come On, Cowboy! is a 1948 American Western film starring Mantan Moreland and Mauryne Brent. Goldmax Productions produced the film, and Toddy Pictures distributed it.

The Library of Congress has two posters for the film. Getty Images has a photo from the film. An advertisement that ran in the Indianapolis Recorder in 1950 touted the film as a "Riot of songs and laffs in this roaring musical Western!".

== Plot ==
In the film Moreland and a friend head west to prepare a ranch for a wedding. It has been deserted for years and outlaws are using it as a hideout.

== Cast ==
The film was advertised as having "An All Negro Cast".

- Mantan Moreland
- Mauryne Brent
- Johnny Lee
- F. E. Miller

== Songs ==
The film features songs:

- "I can't get him off my mind"
- "Do that thing"
- "Boll weevil"
