= Br'er Rabbit =

Fictional rabbit in Uncle Remus folklore

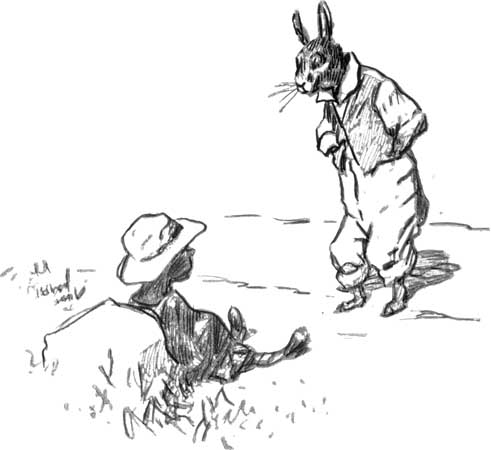
- Br'er Rabbit and the Tar-Baby, drawing by E. W. Kemble from "The Tar-Baby", by Joel Chandler Harris, 1904
- First appearance: 19th century
- Created by: unknown, Robert Roosevelt, Joel Chandler Harris, Alcée Fortier
- Voiced by: Johnny Lee (Song of the South and Mickey Mouse's Birthday Party); James Baskett (The Laughing Place sequence in Song of the South); Art Carney (Walt Disney's Song Parade from Disneyland); Dallas McKennon (record releases); Jess Harnell (1989–present); Nick Cannon (2006 adaptation)

In-universe information
- Aliases: Riley, Compair Lapin
- Species: Rabbit
- Gender: Male
- Occupation: Trickster

Br'er Rabbit (/ˈbrɛər/ BRAIR; an abbreviation of Brother Rabbit, also spelled Brer Rabbit) is a central figure in African-American folktales. The character is an oral tradition passed down by African-Americans of the Southern United States and African descendants in the Caribbean, notably Afro-Bahamians and Turks and Caicos Islanders. He is a trickster who succeeds by his wits rather than by brawn, provoking authority figures and bending social mores as he sees fit. Popular adaptations of the character, originally recorded by Joel Chandler Harris in the 19th century, include Disney's 1946 film Song of the South.

== African origins ==
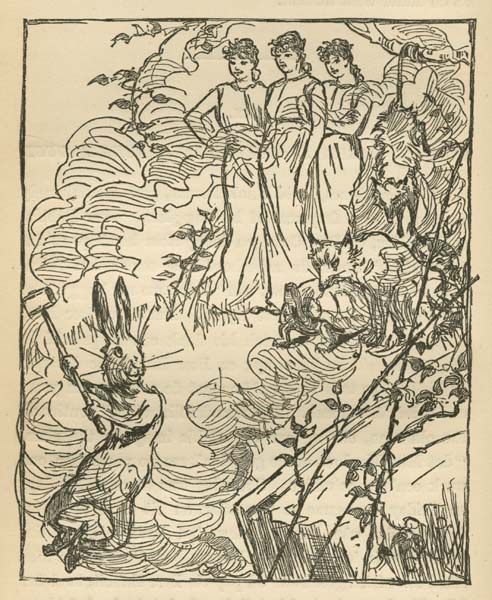
Br'er Rabbit's dream, from Uncle Remus, His Songs and His Sayings: The Folk-Lore of the Old Plantation, 1881

The Br'er Rabbit stories can be traced back to trickster figures in Africa, particularly the hare that figures prominently in the storytelling traditions in West, Central, and Southern Africa. Among the Temne people in Sierra Leone, they tell children stories of a talking rabbit. Other regions of Africa also tell children stories of talking rabbits and other animals. These tales continue to be part of the traditional folklore of numerous peoples throughout those regions. In the Akan traditions of West Africa, the trickster is usually the spider Anansi, though the plots in his tales are often identical with those of stories of Br'er Rabbit. However, Anansi does encounter a tricky rabbit called "Adanko" (Asante-Twi to mean "Hare") in some stories. The Jamaican character with the same name "Brer Rabbit" is an adaptation of the Ananse stories of the Akan people.

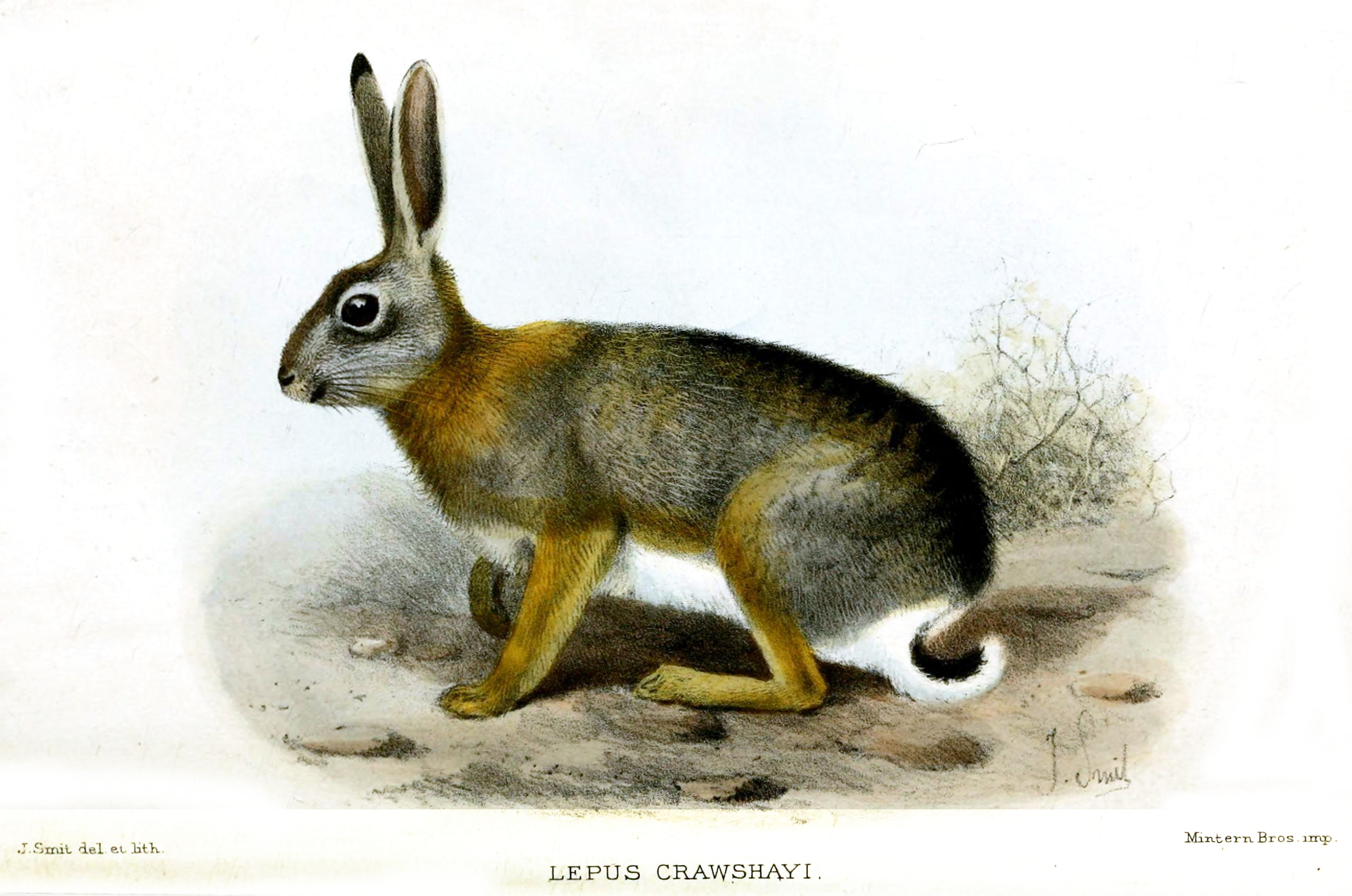
The African savanna hare (Lepus microtis) found in many regions on the African continent: the original Br'er Rabbit.

Some scholars have suggested that in his American incarnation, Br'er Rabbit represented the enslaved Africans who used their wits to overcome adversity and to exact revenge on their adversaries, the white slave owners. Though not always successful, the efforts of Br'er Rabbit made him a folk hero.

Several elements in the Brer Rabbit Tar Baby story (e.g., rabbit needing to be taught a lesson, punching and head butting the rabbit, the stuck rabbit being swung around and around) are reminiscent of those found in a Zimbabwe-Botswana folktale.

Folklorists in the late 19th century first documented evidence that the American versions of the stories originated among enslaved West Africans based on connections between Br'er Rabbit and Leuk, a rabbit trickster in Senegalese folklore.

== American adaptations ==
Stories of Br'er Rabbit were written down by Robert Roosevelt, an uncle of U.S. President Theodore Roosevelt. Theodore Roosevelt wrote in his autobiography about his aunt from Georgia that "she knew all the 'Br'er Rabbit' stories, and I was brought up on them. One of my uncles, Robert Roosevelt, was much struck with them, and took them down from her dictation, publishing them in Harper's, where they fell flat. This was a good many years before a genius arose who, in 'Uncle Remus', made the stories immortal."

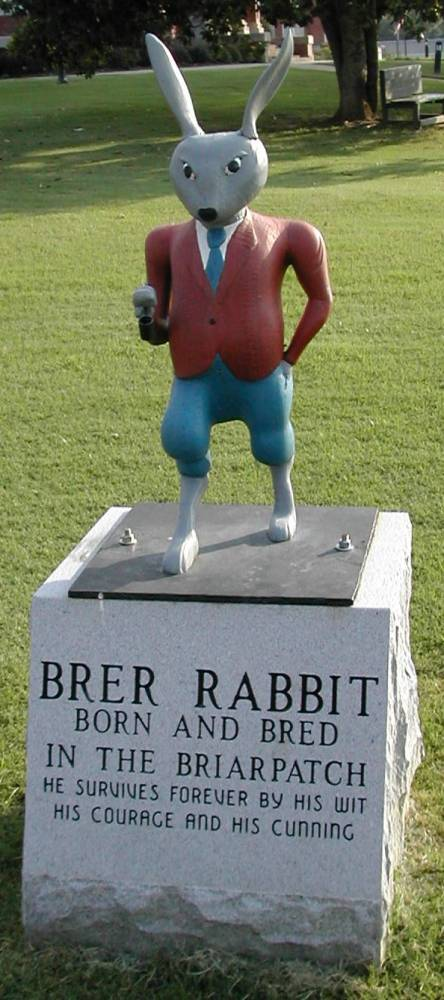
Eatonton, Georgia's statue of Br'er Rabbit

Some stories were also adapted by Joel Chandler Harris (1845–1908) for white audiences in the late 19th century. Harris invented Uncle Remus, an ex-slave narrator, as a storyteller and published many such stories that had been passed down by oral tradition. He claimed his stories were "the first graphic pictures of genuine negro life in the South." Harris also attributed the birth name Riley to Br'er Rabbit. Harris heard these tales in Georgia. Very similar versions of the same stories were recorded independently at the same time by the folklorist Alcée Fortier in southern Louisiana, where the Rabbit character was known as Compair Lapin in Creole. It has been argued that Beatrix Potter based her Peter Rabbit tales on Brer Rabbit.

== Indigenous American parallels ==
In a detailed study of the sources of Joel Chandler Harris's "Uncle Remus" stories, Florence Baer identified 140 stories with African origins, 27 stories with European origins, and 5 stories with Native American origins.

Although Joel Chandler Harris collected materials for his famous series of books featuring the character Br'er Rabbit in the 1870s, the Br'er Rabbit cycle had been recorded earlier among the Cherokees: The "tar baby" story was printed in an 1845 edition of the Cherokee Advocate, the same year Joel Chandler Harris was born.

Algonquin Nations in Eastern North America similarly depict rabbits and hares as cunning and witty. Many stories of rabbits' or hares' wit include connections to the trickster, shapeshifter sometimes referred to as Nanabozho.

In "That the People Might Live: Native American Literatures and Native American Community" by Jace Weaver, the origins of Br'er Rabbit and other literature are discussed. Although the Cherokee had lived in isolation from Europeans in the remote past, a substantial amount of interaction was to occur among North American tribes, Europeans, and those from the enslaved population during the 18th and 19th centuries. It is impossible to ascertain whether the Cherokee story independently predated the African American story.

In a Cherokee tale about the briar patch, "the fox and the wolf throw the trickster rabbit into a thicket from which the rabbit quickly escapes." There was a "melding of the Cherokee rabbit-trickster ... into the culture of African slaves."

== Joel Chandler Harris ==
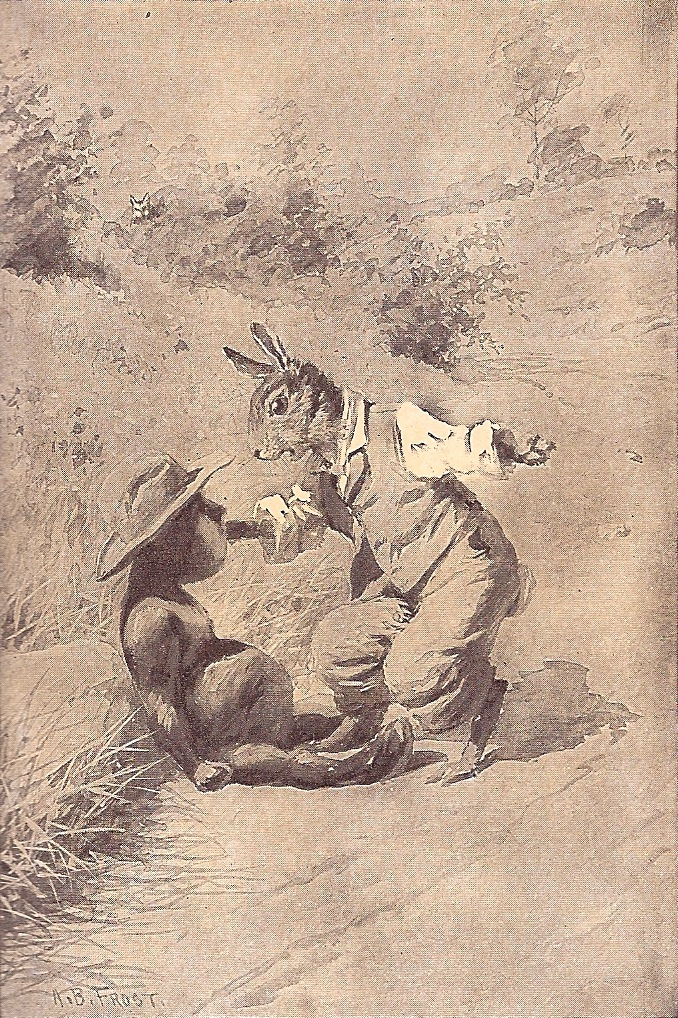
A.B. Frost illustration of Brer Rabbit and the Tar Baby from the 1895 version of Uncle Remus: His Songs and Sayings

There are 16 books by Joel Chandler Harris that contain Brer Rabbit stories (not all with Uncle Remus):

- Uncle Remus, His Songs and His Sayings: The Folk-Lore of the Old Plantation (1881), containing 25 Brer Rabbit stories.
- Nights with Uncle Remus: Myths and Legends of the Old Plantation (1883), containing 52 Brer Rabbit stories.
- Daddy Jake the Runaway and Short Stories Told After Dark (1889), containing four Brer Rabbit stories.
- On the Plantation: A Story of a Georgia Boy's Adventures During the War (1892), containing one Brer Rabbit story.
- Uncle Remus and His Friends: Old Plantation Stories, Songs, and Ballads with Sketches of Negro Character (1892), containing 11 Brer Rabbit stories.
- Evening Tales: Done into English from the French of Frédéric Ortoli by Joel Chandler Harris (1893), containing one Brer Rabbit story.
- Little Mr. Thimblefinger and His Queer Country: What the Children Saw and Heard There (1894), containing five Brer Rabbit stories (plus the frame-story with an older Brer Rabbit).
- Mr. Rabbit at Home: A Sequel to Little Mr. Thimblefinger and His Queer Country (1895), containing three Brer Rabbit stories (plus the frame-story with an older Brer Rabbit, and a story about his ancestor Oldest of All the Rabbits).
- Plantation Pageants (1899), containing two Brer Rabbit stories.
- Wally Wanderoon and His Story-Telling Machine (1903), containing one Brer Rabbit story.
- The Tar-Baby and Other Rhymes of Uncle Remus (1904), containing seven Brer Rabbit stories.
- Told by Uncle Remus: New Stories of the Old Plantation (1905), containing 13 Brer Rabbit stories.
- Uncle Remus and Brer Rabbit (1907), containing ten Brer Rabbit stories.
- Uncle Remus and the Little Boy (1910), containing ten Brer Rabbit stories.
- Uncle Remus Returns (1918), containing six Brer Rabbit stories.
- Seven Tales of Uncle Remus (1948), containing four Brer Rabbit stories.

== Enid Blyton ==
There are eight books by Enid Blyton that are collections of stories featuring Brer Rabbit and friends, most of which appeared in various magazines in the late 1930s.

- Heyo, Brer Rabbit! (1938)
- The Further Adventures of Brer Rabbit (1943)
- My Enid Blyton Brer Rabbit Book (1948)
- Enid Blyton's Brer Rabbit Book (1963)
- Enid Blyton's Brer Rabbit Again (1963)
- Enid Blyton's Brer Rabbit's a Rascal (1965)
- Enid Blyton's Brer Rabbit Holiday Adventures (1974)
- Enid Blyton's Brer Rabbit Funtime Adventures (1974)

== In popular culture ==
=== Early comics ===
- In 1902, artist Jean Mohr adapted the Uncle Remus stories into a two-page comic story titled Ole Br'er Rabbit for The North American.
- The McClure Newspaper Syndicate released a Br'er Rabbit Sunday strip drawn by J.M. Condé from June 24 to October 7, 1906.

=== Disney version ===
Br'er Rabbit in Walt Disney's Song of the South (1946). Disney's version of the character is more stylized and cartoony than the illustrations of Br'er Rabbit in Harris' books.

- Disney's 1946 film Song of the South is a frame story based on four Br'er Rabbit stories, "Br'er Rabbit Earns a Dollar a Minute", "The Laughing Place" and "The Tar Baby" plus its direct sequel "How Mr. Rabbit Was Too Sharp for Mr. Fox". The character of Br'er Rabbit was voiced by Johnny Lee in the film, and was portrayed as more of a "lovable trickster" than previous tales. Disney comics starring that version of Br'er Rabbit have been produced since 1946.
- Splash Mountain, a thrill ride at Tokyo Disneyland and formerly at Disneyland and Magic Kingdom, is based on the above 1946 film's animated segments featuring Br'er Rabbit. Br'er Rabbit also appeared at the Walt Disney Parks and Resorts for meet-and-greets, parades and shows. He also appeared on the television series House of Mouse (2001–2003) and in the 2001 direct-to-video Mickey's Magical Christmas: Snowed in at the House of Mouse, as well as in the 2011 video game Kinect: Disneyland Adventures. Starting with the Disneyland version of Splash Mountain in 1989, Jess Harnell has provided the voice of Br'er Rabbit in all of his modern Disney appearances.
- An Uncle Remus and His Tales of Br'er Rabbit newspaper strip ran from October 14, 1946, through December 31, 1972.

=== Other adaptations and references ===
- In Richard Adams' Watership Down, according to the narrator, some Brer Rabbit stories are inspired by those of the trickster El-Ahrairah.
- Tales of the Okefenokee, a former thrill ride at Six Flags Over Georgia from 1967 to 1980, is inspired by the Uncle Remus stories of Joel Chandler Harris. The main character of the attraction, Mr. Rabbit, is inspired by Br'er Rabbit.
- On April 21, 1972, astronaut John Young became the ninth person to step onto the Moon, and in his first words he stated, "I'm sure glad they got ol' Brer Rabbit, here, back in the briar patch where he belongs."
- In 1975, the stories were retold for an adult audience in the cult animation film Coonskin, directed by Ralph Bakshi.
- In 1984, American composer Van Dyke Parks produced a children's album, Jump!, based on the Br'er Rabbit tales.
- Rabbit Ears Productions produced two Br'er Rabbit tales ( Brer Rabbit and the Wonderful Tar Baby and Brer Rabbit and Boss Lion)
- 1998's Star Trek: Insurrection saw the Starship Enterprise enter a region of space called the Briar Patch. At some point during a battle with the Son'a, Commander Riker states that it is "time to use the Briar Patch the way Br'er Rabbit did".
- A direct-to-video film based on the stories, The Adventures of Brer Rabbit, was released in 2006. Nick Cannon provides his voice for the character.
- There is a brand of molasses produced by B&G Foods named after the character.
- In the Tristan Strong series, Br'er Rabbit appears as a recurring character. He is depicted as a cynical but well-meaning mentor god.

== See also ==
- Br'er Fox and Br'er Bear
- Gullah storytelling
- List of Uncle Remus characters
