= Johnny Lee (actor) =

American singer, dancer, and actor (1898–1965)

- Publicity Photo of Johnny Lee
- Born: John Dotson Lee Jr. July 4, 1898; Springfield, Missouri, U.S.
- Died: December 12, 1965 (aged 67); Los Angeles, California, U.S.
- Occupations: Actor; singer; dancer
- Years active: 1932–1965
- Spouse: Jenrive Lee

John Dotson Lee Jr. (July 4, 1898 - December 12, 1965) was an American singer, dancer and actor known for voicing the role of Br'er Rabbit in Disney's Song of the South (1946) and as Algonquin J. Calhoun in the CBS TV and radio comedy series Amos 'n' Andy in the early 1950s. Much of his career was spent in vaudeville, but he also performed in motion pictures, on recordings and in television. He released a record (as "Johnnie Lee") in July 1949 called "You Can't Lose A Broken Heart" (Columbia Records # 30172), with backup vocals by The Ebonaires. Lee also starred in an all-black musical comedy called "Sugar Hill" in 1949 at Las Palmas Theatre in California.

He died of a heart attack on December 12, 1965, aged 67.

== Discography ==
- Song of the South: Soundtrack (1946)
- You Can't Lose a Broken Heart (released July 1949)
- Mickey Mouse's Birthday Party (1954)

== Selected filmography ==
Year	Title	Role	Notes
1932	The Black King	Count of Zanzibar	Alternative title: Harlem Hot Shot
1936	The Green Pastures	Angel	Uncredited
1942	Tales of Manhattan	Shantytown Carpenter (Robeson sequence)	Uncredited
1943	Stormy Weather	Lyles	Uncredited
1946	Song of the South	Br'er Rabbit	Voice
1946	Mantan Runs for Mayor		
1948	Boarding House Blues	Stanley	
1948	The Return of Mandy's Husband		
1948	She's Too Mean for Me		
1948	Come On, Cowboy!		
1951	My Forbidden Past	Toy Vendor	Uncredited
1952	The Narrow Margin	Waiter	Uncredited
1953	Ramar of the Jungle	Chief Warren	Episode: "Savage Fury"
1951-1953	The Amos 'n Andy Show (TV)	Algonquin J. Calhoun	68 episodes
1955	Screen Directors Playhouse	Simon	Episode: "Lincoln's Doctor's Dog"
1956	The First Traveling Saleslady	Amos	Uncredited
1956	Soldiers of Fortune	Kamele	Episode: "The Greater Magic"
1956	The Adventures of Jim Bowie	Israel	Episode: "The Return of the Alciblade"
1957	The Spirit of St. Louis	Jess - Cook at Louie's Shack	Uncredited
1958	Hot Spell	Colored Man	Uncredited
1960	The Rat Race	Janitor	Uncredited
1960	High Time	Servant at Judge Carter's Ball	Uncredited
1960	North to Alaska	Coachman	Uncredited
1962-1963	Dennis the Menace	Johnny the Locksmith; Mr. Tibbitt	2 episodes (final television appearance)
