= Br'er Fox and Br'er Bear =

Characters from African-American oral traditions

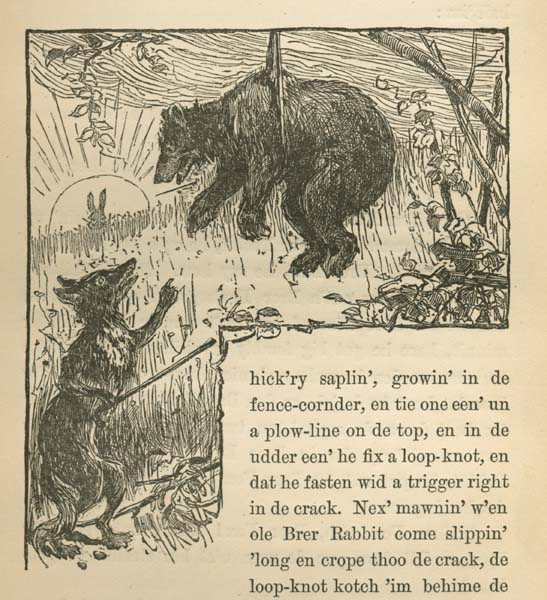
- Br'er Fox and Br'er Bear, from Uncle Remus, His Songs and His Sayings: The Folk-Lore of the Old Plantation, 1881
- First appearance: 19th century Song of the South (1946)
- Created by: Traditional, Robert Roosevelt, Joel Chandler Harris, Alcée Fortier, Enid Blyton
- Voiced by: Br'er Fox: James Baskett (Song of the South); Stan Freberg (Mickey Mouse's Birthday Party); J.D. Hall (1989-Present); Br'er Bear: Nick Stewart (Song of the South, Mickey Mouse's Birthday Party, and Splash Mountain; Disneyland version); James Avery (1990-2011)

In-universe information
- Species: Red fox Brown bear
- Gender: Male

Br'er Fox and Br'er Bear (also spelled Brer Fox and Brer Bear, (Note: Joel Chandler Harris' representation of U.S. Southern black pronunciation of "brother") /ˈbrɛər/) are fictional anthropomorphic cartoon characters in African-American folktales. They originate from African-American oral traditions popular in the Southern United States. These characters have been recorded by many different folklorists, but are most well-known from the folktales adapted and compiled by Joel Chandler Harris, featuring his character Uncle Remus.

== Disney version ==
Br'er Fox and Br'er Bear in Song of the South (1946). Disney's versions of the anthropomorphic characters are more stylized and cartoony than the illustrations in Harris's books.

In the animated sequences of the 1946 Walt Disney-produced film Song of the South, like in the tales, Br'er Fox is the stories' antagonist, while Br'er Bear is his unintelligent accomplice. Br'er Fox was voiced by James Baskett, who also portrayed the live-action character Uncle Remus in the film, while Brer Bear was voiced by Nick Stewart. In contrast to the earlier illustrations of Frederick S. Church, A. B. Frost, and E. W. Kemble, the Disney animators depict the anthropomorphic characters in a more slapstick, cartoony style.

The Disney versions of the anthropomorphic characters have made appearances in other works:

- Br'er Fox and Br'er Bear appear in the Splash Mountain attraction at Tokyo Disneyland and formerly at Disneyland and Magic Kingdom. They also appeared with Br'er Rabbit at the Walt Disney Parks and Resorts for meet-and-greets, parades and shows.
- A segment dedicated to the pair is featured in the 1956 one-hour television special Our Unsung Villains.
- Br'er Bear has a cameo appearance in the television series Bonkers in the episode "CasaBonkers".
- Br'er Fox and Br'er Bear make cameo appearances in several episodes of the television series House of Mouse (2001–2003), and in the 2001 direct-to-video release Mickey's Magical Christmas: Snowed in at the House of Mouse.
- Br'er Bear has made cameo appearances in other Disney films. He can be seen frequently in various scenes in the 1988 film Who Framed Roger Rabbit, and he is seen in silhouette in the 2004 direct-to-video film The Lion King 1½ along with many other Disney cartoon characters in the ending scene.
- Br'er Bear has also made sporadic appearances in Disney comics. Although one Disney comic names Br'er Bear a title of "Honorary Constable of Cockleberry County" his "performance" is more akin to Fearless Fosdick. They appear sometimes in the Li'l Bad Wolf stories, where Br'er Bear is a farmer, and is sometimes on friendly terms with the other animals. Br'er Bear and Br'er Fox, along with Br'er Weasel, Br'er Buzzard and the Big Bad Wolf (A.K.A. Zeke Wolf or Br'er Wolf) are members of the "Foul Order of Foulfellows". A running gag is Zeke trying to get his hands on Br'er Bear's chickens so he can eat them, and he ends up getting pounded by Br'er Bear. They also appear often in the Dutch Donald Duck comics, usually hunting Broer Konijn (Dutch for Brer Rabbit). There, they are also given the names Rein Vos and Bruin Beer, respectively.
- Both Br'er Bear and Br'er Fox make an appearance in the 2011 video game Kinect: Disneyland Adventures (Disneyland Adventures in the 2017 remaster) and both can be seen near Splash Mountain in Critter Country.
- Br'er Bear's coat and farm hat appear in 2022 film Chip 'n Dale: Rescue Rangers.

== Other adaptations ==
Br'er Fox and Br'er Bear also appear in the Tales of the Okefenokee attraction at Six Flags Over Georgia as Mr. Fox and Mr. Bear.

The cult film Coonskin, directed by Ralph Bakshi, focuses on a trio of characters inspired by the original folktales. Br'er Rabbit, Br'er Bear and Br'er Fox (renamed "Preacher Fox" in the film) all appear, and the elements of the stories are moved to a then-contemporary urban setting.

The Adventures of Brer Rabbit was a 2006 animated feature including the characters, aimed at families.

In the Tristan Strong series, Br'er Fox was depicted as having a change of heart over time. However, he sacrifices his life to save Tristan and the MidFolk in the first book. In the second book, Br'er Bear is revealed to be the central antagonist, having been upset by the deaths of his friend and children and influenced by King Cotton.

== See also ==
- Br'er Rabbit
- Sister Fox = Lisichka-sestrichka (Ukrainian: Лисичка-сестричка which means Fox-sister)
- Uncle Remus
- Reynard the Fox
