= Uncle Remus =

Folktale of the southern United States

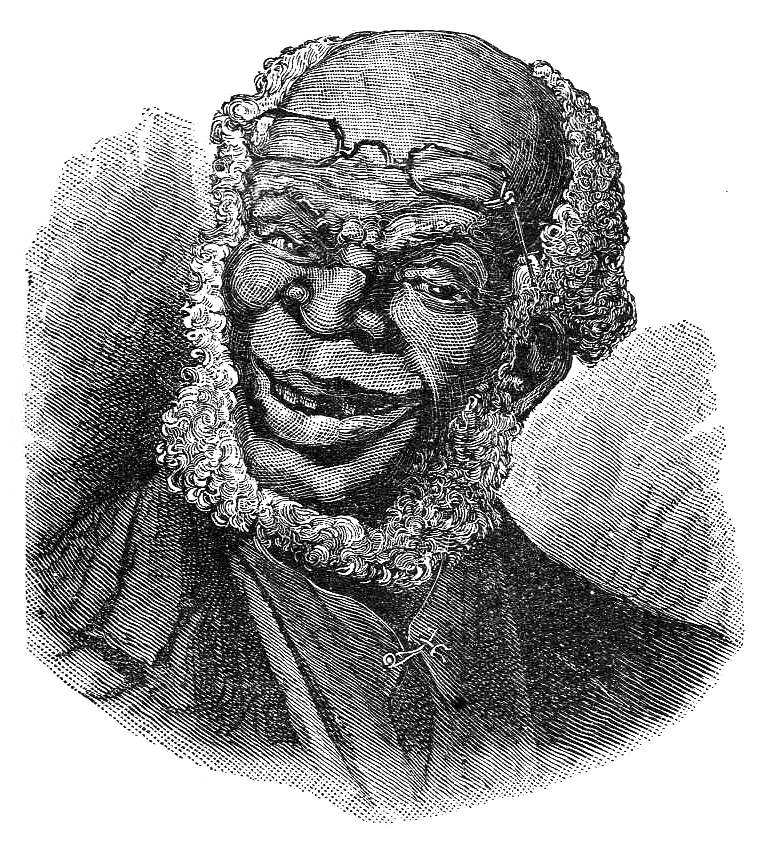
- First appearance: Uncle Remus, His Songs and His Sayings: The Folk-Lore of the Old Plantation
- Created by: Joel Chandler Harris
- Portrayed by: James Baskett (Song of the South)
- Voiced by: Dallas McKennon (record releases)

In-universe information
- Gender: Male
- Nationality: American

Uncle Remus is the fictional title character and narrator of a collection of African American folktales compiled and adapted by Joel Chandler Harris and published in book form in 1881. Harris was a journalist in post–Reconstruction era Atlanta, and he produced seven Uncle Remus books. He did so by introducing tales that he had heard and framing them in the plantation context. He wrote his stories in a dialect which was his interpretation of the Deep South African-American language of the time. For these framing and stylistic choices, Harris's collection has garnered controversy since its publication.

== Structure ==
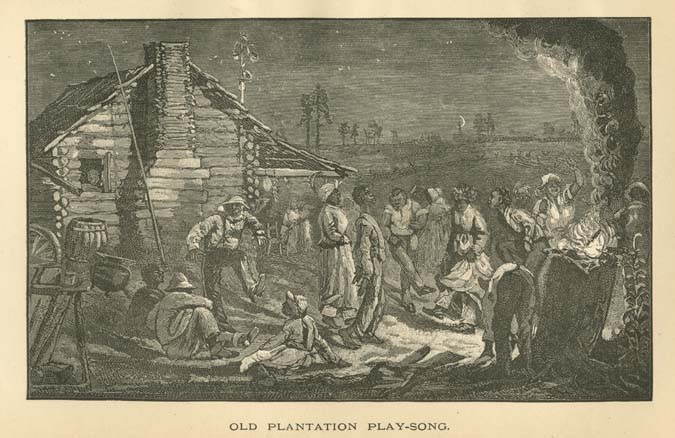
"Old Plantation Play Song", from Uncle Remus, His Songs and His Sayings: The Folk-Lore of the Old Plantation, 1881

Uncle Remus is a collection of animal stories, songs, and oral folklore collected from Southern Black Americans. Many of the stories are didactic, much like those of Aesop's Fables and Jean de La Fontaine's stories. Uncle Remus is a kindly old freedman who serves as a story-telling device, passing on the folktales to children gathered around him, like the traditional African griot.

The stories are written in an eye dialect devised by Harris to represent a Deep South Black dialect. Uncle Remus is a compilation of Br'er Rabbit storytellers whom Harris had encountered during his time at the Turnwold Plantation. Harris said that the use of the Black dialect was an effort to add to the effect of the stories and to allow the stories to retain their authenticity. The genre of stories is the trickster tale. At the time of Harris's publication, his work was praised for its ability to capture plantation Black dialect.

Br'er Rabbit ("Brother Rabbit") is the main character of the stories, a character prone to tricks and troublemaking, who is often opposed by Br'er Fox and Br'er Bear. In one tale, Br'er Fox constructs a doll out of a lump of tar and puts clothing on it. When Br'er Rabbit comes along, he addresses the "tar baby" amiably but receives no response. Br'er Rabbit becomes offended by what he perceives as the tar baby's lack of manners, punches it, kicks it, and becomes stuck.

== Related works ==
Harris compiled seven volumes of Uncle Remus stories between 1881 and 1907; a further three books were published posthumously, following his death in 1908.

- Uncle Remus, His Songs and His Sayings: The Folk-Lore of the Old Plantation (1881)
- Nights with Uncle Remus: Myths and Legends of the Old Plantation (1883)
- Daddy Jake the Runaway and Short Stories Told After Dark (1889)
- Uncle Remus and His Friends: Old Plantation Stories, Songs, and Ballads With Sketches of Negro Character (1892)
- The Tar-Baby and Other Rhymes of Uncle Remus (1904)
- Told by Uncle Remus: New Stories of the Old Plantation (1905)
- Uncle Remus and Brer Rabbit (1907)
- Uncle Remus and the Little Boy (1910)
- Uncle Remus Returns (1918)
- Seven Tales of Uncle Remus (1948)

== Adaptations in film and other media ==
=== Comics ===
In 1902, artist Jean Mohr adapted the Uncle Remus stories into a two-page comic story titled Ole Br'er Rabbit for The North American.

The McClure Newspaper Syndicate released a Br'er Rabbit Sunday strip drawn by J. M. Condé from June 24 to October 7, 1906.

An Uncle Remus and His Tales of Br'er Rabbit newspaper Sundays-only strip (King Features Syndicate) ran from October 14, 1945, through December 31, 1972, as an offshoot of the Disney comics strip Silly Symphony.

=== Films and television ===
Films

- Walt Disney's Song of the South (1946), a live action/animated musical drama with James Baskett as Remus. Baskett was given an Honorary Academy Award in 1948.
- Ralph Bakshi's film Coonskin (1975), a satire of the Disney film which adapts and mocks the Uncle Remus stories in a contemporary Harlem setting.
- The Adventures of Brer Rabbit (2006) from Universal Animation Studios, a modern adaptation of the stories featuring the voice of Nick Cannon as the title character.

Television

- Rémusz bácsi meséi (1967) from Magyar Televízió, a Hungarian 13-episode television series.
- Jänis Vemmelsäären seikkailut (1987–1988) from Yle, an eight-part Finnish television series that aired on Yle TV2, as a part of the children's show Pikku Kakkonen.
- Brer Rabbit Tales (1991), a 47-minute television film written and directed by Al Guest and Jean Mathieson for Emerald City Productions.
- Brer Rabbit's Christmas Carol (1992) from Magic Shadows, a 58-minute sequel to the earlier film from the same writer-director staff retreading the plot of Charles Dickens's A Christmas Carol with the Remus characters.
- The Outrageous Brer Rabbit (1994) from Magic Shadows, a 30-minute sequel to the earlier Christmas film from the same writer-director staff using the same characters in a summer festival-themed film.

=== Music ===
"Uncle Remus" is a song by Frank Zappa and George Duke from Zappa's 1974 album Apostrophe (').

Bob Dylan lists several people that are commonly looked to for hope and inspiration in his poem "Last Thoughts on Woody Guthrie", saying "that stuff ain't real... And Uncle Remus can't tell you and neither can Santa Claus."

=== Influence ===
Uncle Remus has been claimed as a major influence on Beatrix Potter.

== See also ==
- List of Uncle Remus characters
- Tar-Baby
- Magical Negro

== Bibliography ==
- "Joel Chandler Harris 1845 or 48 -- 1908". Eaton Literary Festival. Eatonton, Georgia. Archived from the original on October 29, 2017. Short biography of Joel Chandler Harris with photograph
- Roosevelt, Theodore. "Theodore Roosevelt (1858–1919). An Autobiography. 1913 (Boyhood and Youth)". References in Theodore Roosevelt's autobiography to Brer Rabbit and Uncle Remus.
- "William Ruhlmann". AllMusic.
