= Bayou Country =

Bayou Country may refer to:

- Bayou Country, a region in the Gulf Coast of the US where bayous are found
- Bayou Country (album), a 1969 album by American rock band Creedence Clearwater Revival
- Bayou Country (Disneyland), formerly Critter Country, a themed land in Disneyland Park
