= Hungry Bear Barbecue Jamboree =

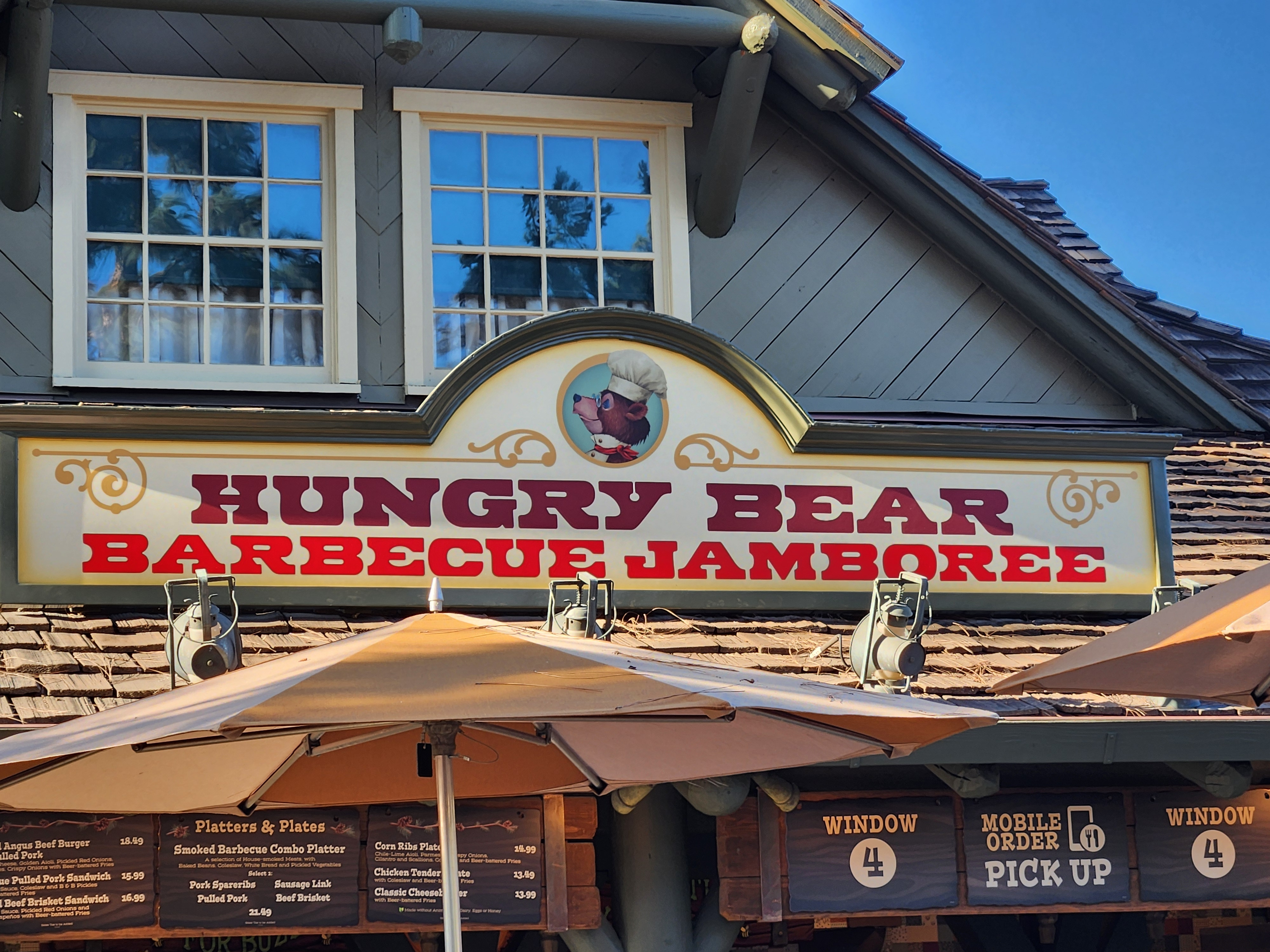
- The restaurant sign at Disneyland

- Location in Orange County Location in Greater Los Angeles Location in California

Restaurant information
- Established: September 24, 1972
- Owner: The Walt Disney Company
- Head chef: Jeremiah Balogh
- Food type: American
- Dress code: Casual
- Location: Bayou Country, Disneyland Park, Anaheim, Orange County, California, 92802, United States
- Coordinates: 33°48′45.89″N 117°55′21.73″W
- Reservations: No
- Website: disneyland.disney.go.com/dining/disneyland/hungry-bear-barbecue/

Hungry Bear Barbecue Jamboree is an American-style restaurant in the Bayou Country land at Disneyland in Anaheim, California. There is a similar dining location in Westernland at Tokyo Disneyland called Hungry Bear Restaurant. The Disneyland location is themed to characters from the Country Bear Musical Jamboree at Magic Kingdom.

== History of Disneyland location ==
The Hungry Bear Barbecue Jamboree was originally named the Golden Bear Lodge. The Lodge opened in September 1972 in Bear Country in Disneyland. In 1977, the restaurant reopened as the Hungry Bear Restaurant. The restaurant at Disneyland was rethemed to Hungry Bear Barbecue Jamboree in October 2024. In November 2024, the area's most recent name of Critter Country was changed to Bayou Country.

== Design ==
At Disneyland, Hungry Bear Barbecue Jamboree is located next to The Many Adventures of Winnie the Pooh. The restaurant is two stories. The restaurant has a rustic feel and has patio dining, overlooking the Rivers of America.

== Cuisine ==
The restaurant serves American cuisine and specializes in barbecue platters. The menu also updates with seasonal offerings, including themed foods based on special events and holidays at the park.
