= Disneyland Handcrafted =

2026 American documentary film

- Promotional poster
- Directed by: Leslie Iwerks
- Written by: Leslie Iwerks
- Produced by: Leslie Iwerks
- Distributed by: Disney+
- Release date: January 22, 2026
- Running time: 78 minutes
- Country: United States
- Language: English

Disneyland Handcrafted is a 2026 American documentary film directed by Leslie Iwerks. The film examines the construction of Disneyland during the early 1950s using archival motion picture footage and audio recordings from the period. It was released on January 22, 2026, on Disney+, following a limited theatrical engagement earlier that month.

== Synopsis ==
The documentary focuses on the development and construction of Disneyland in Anaheim, California, from the initial groundbreaking through the park's opening on July 17, 1955. Rather than relying on contemporary interviews, the film is composed primarily of restored archival footage depicting construction activities, design work, and operational preparations undertaken by laborers, artists, and engineers involved in the project.

The film portrays the accelerated pace of construction in the months leading up to opening day, highlighting logistical challenges, incomplete infrastructure, and last‑minute problem‑solving. Emphasis is placed on the collaborative nature of the work and the manual craftsmanship involved in creating the park's themed environments.

== Production ==
Disneyland Handcrafted was directed and produced by Leslie Iwerks, who has previously worked on documentary projects related to the history of The Walt Disney Company. Development of the film involved extensive archival research within the Walt Disney Archives, including the review of hundreds of hours of 16 mm film footage, some of which had not been publicly released prior to the documentary's production. Iwerks presented a seven-minute proof of concept, but needed to add additional sound and effects into it, since none of that was included with the original film. Digging through older interviews and transcripts, she realized this was the story she ultimately wanted to tell.

The archival footage was digitally restored for modern exhibition. The documentary does not use an on‑screen narrator; instead, the archival material provides the film's chronological structure.

== Release ==
The film received a limited theatrical engagement at AMC Burbank Town Center 8 in California in January 2026 prior to its streaming debut. Disneyland Handcrafted was released for streaming on Disney+ on January 22, 2026, and was also made available via Disney's official YouTube channels.

== Reception ==
Disneyland Handcrafted received generally positive reviews from critics.

Reviews frequently noted the documentary's extensive use of archival footage and its observational approach. Writing for Entertainment Weekly, critics highlighted the film's focus on the compressed timeline and logistical challenges involved in constructing Disneyland. Coverage in People emphasized the inclusion of previously unseen footage documenting the park's unfinished state shortly before opening day. The New York Times writes, "it's fitting that the film is itself a dive into midcentury nostalgia, capturing the postwar optimism as well as the manual labor, whether with heavy machinery or paintbrushes, of an analog age."

Some reviewers observed that the absence of narration or contemporary interviews results in a restrained tone that may appeal primarily to viewers with an existing interest in Disneyland history
