= Bayou Country (Disneyland) =

Themed land at Disneyland

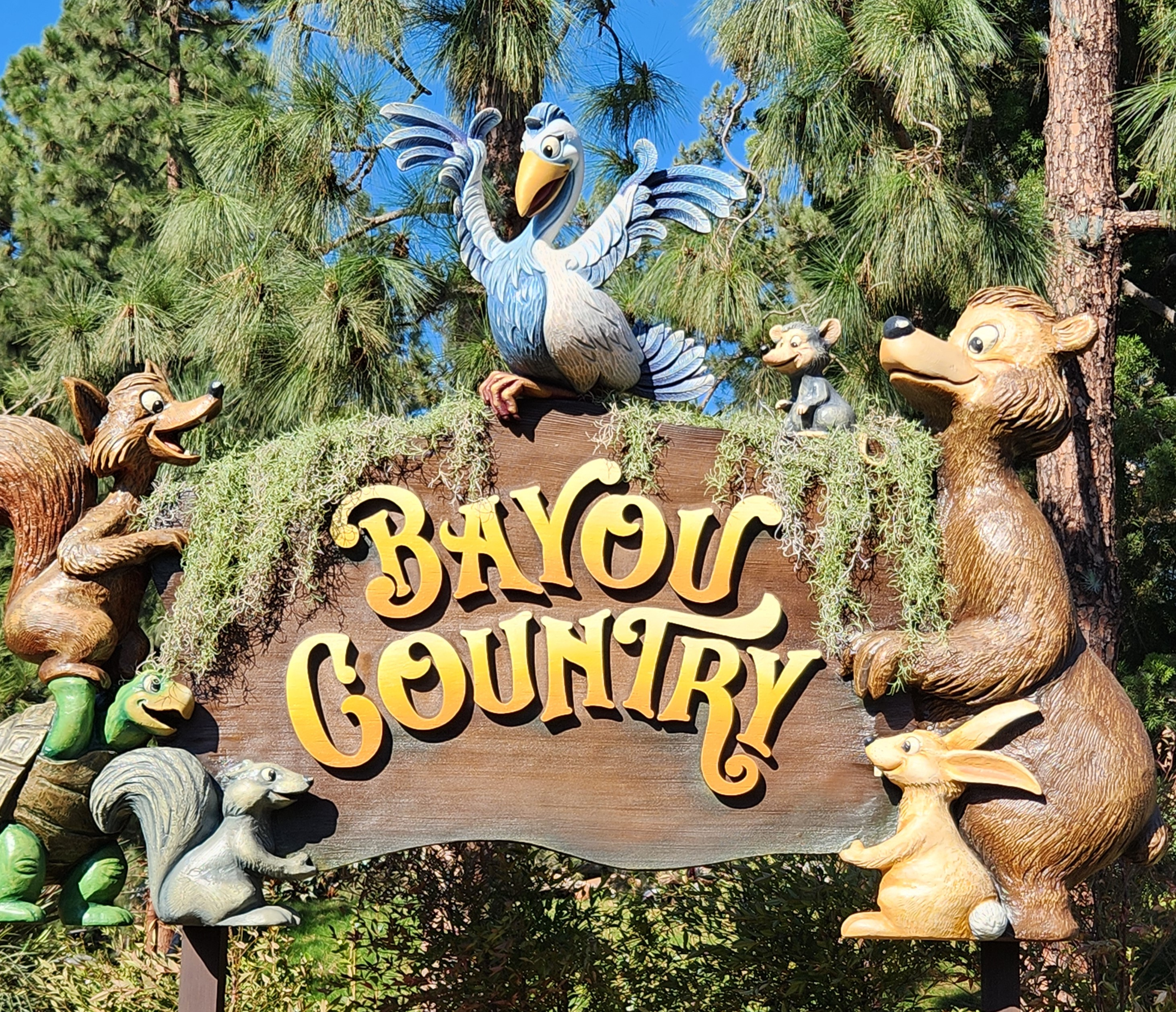
- Theme: Land of animals

Disneyland
- Coordinates: 33°48′44.46″N 117°55′22.03″W
- Status: Operating
- Opened: November 15, 2024
- Replaced: Critter Country

Bayou Country is one of the lands at Disneyland. There is a similar land at Tokyo Disneyland called Critter Country. At Disneyland it opened in 1972 as Bear Country, with the Country Bear Jamboree (1972–2001) as its centerpiece. In 1988 it was renamed Critter Country, and in 2024 it was renamed Bayou Country to coincide with the opening of Tiana's Bayou Adventure.

== History ==
Bayou Country was originally named Indian Village. From 1956–1971, this section of Frontierland was a showcase of Native American culture, including the arts and architecture of several regions, a multi tribal dance show, and the Indian War Canoes. The area was rebuilt as Disneyland's seventh themed land, Bear Country, which opened on March 4, 1972. The new four-acre land, which cost $8 million to build, was Disneyland's first major expansion since the 1969 opening of The Haunted Mansion in the adjacent New Orleans Square. Located in the northwest quadrant of the park, Bear Country was themed to the forests of the Pacific Northwest. Country Bear Jamboree, which opened three weeks later, was the new land's centerpiece attraction.

Bear Country was also home to the Golden Bear Lodge restaurant, which was renamed Hungry Bear Restaurant in 1977 (and renamed in 2024 to Hungry Bear Barbecue Jamboree), the Mile Long Bar refreshment center, Teddi Barra's Swingin' Arcade, and Davy Crockett's Explorer Canoes.

Bear Country was renamed Critter Country in 1988 in anticipation of Splash Mountain's opening in 1989. Critter Country was inspired by a quote from Disney's 1946 film Song of the South, which Splash Mountain was based on: "Where the folks are closer to the critters and the critters are closer to the folks." The land maintained some of its bear themes while incorporating other critters with their huts, nests, and burrows scattered throughout. Some of the land's shops were renamed; for example, Ursus H. Bear's Wilderness Outpost became Crocodile Mercantile (which itself became Pooh Corner in 1996). Country Bear Jamboree closed in 2001 and was replaced two years later by The Many Adventures of Winnie the Pooh.

In June 2020, Disney announced that they would be reworking Splash Mountain to a new ride based on Disney Animation's 2009 film The Princess and the Frog, which was later revealed to be titled Tiana's Bayou Adventure. Splash Mountain closed on May 31, 2023. On November 15, 2024, Critter Country was renamed Bayou Country to coincide with the opening of Tiana's Bayou Adventure.

Bayou Country is small in comparison to Disneyland's other lands. The area features a pathway that wraps around the footprint of Tiana's Bayou Adventure, starting near The Haunted Mansion and ending at the Louis' Critter Club and Pooh Corner shops. In addition, there is another pathway alongside Hungry Bear Barbecue Jamboree that leads to Star Wars: Galaxy's Edge.

== Attractions and entertainment ==
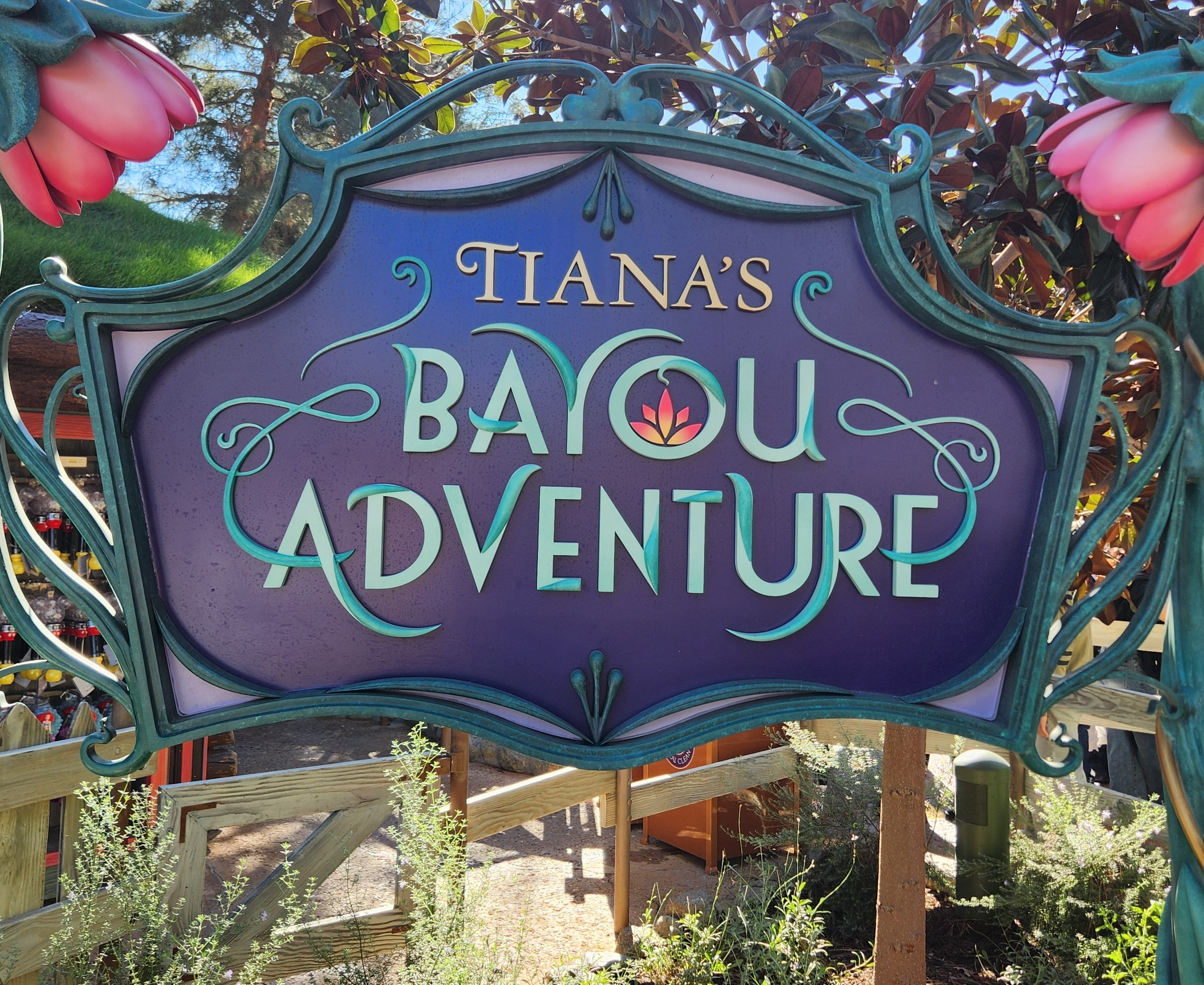
Tiana's Bayou Adventure attraction sign

- Rivers of America
  - Davy Crockett's Explorer Canoes (1956–present)
- The Many Adventures of Winnie the Pooh (2003–present)
- Tiana's Bayou Adventure (2024–present)

=== Former attractions and entertainment ===
- Country Bear Jamboree (1972–2001)
- Teddi Barra's Swingin' Arcade (1972–2003)
- Splash Mountain (1989–2023)

== Restaurants and refreshments ==
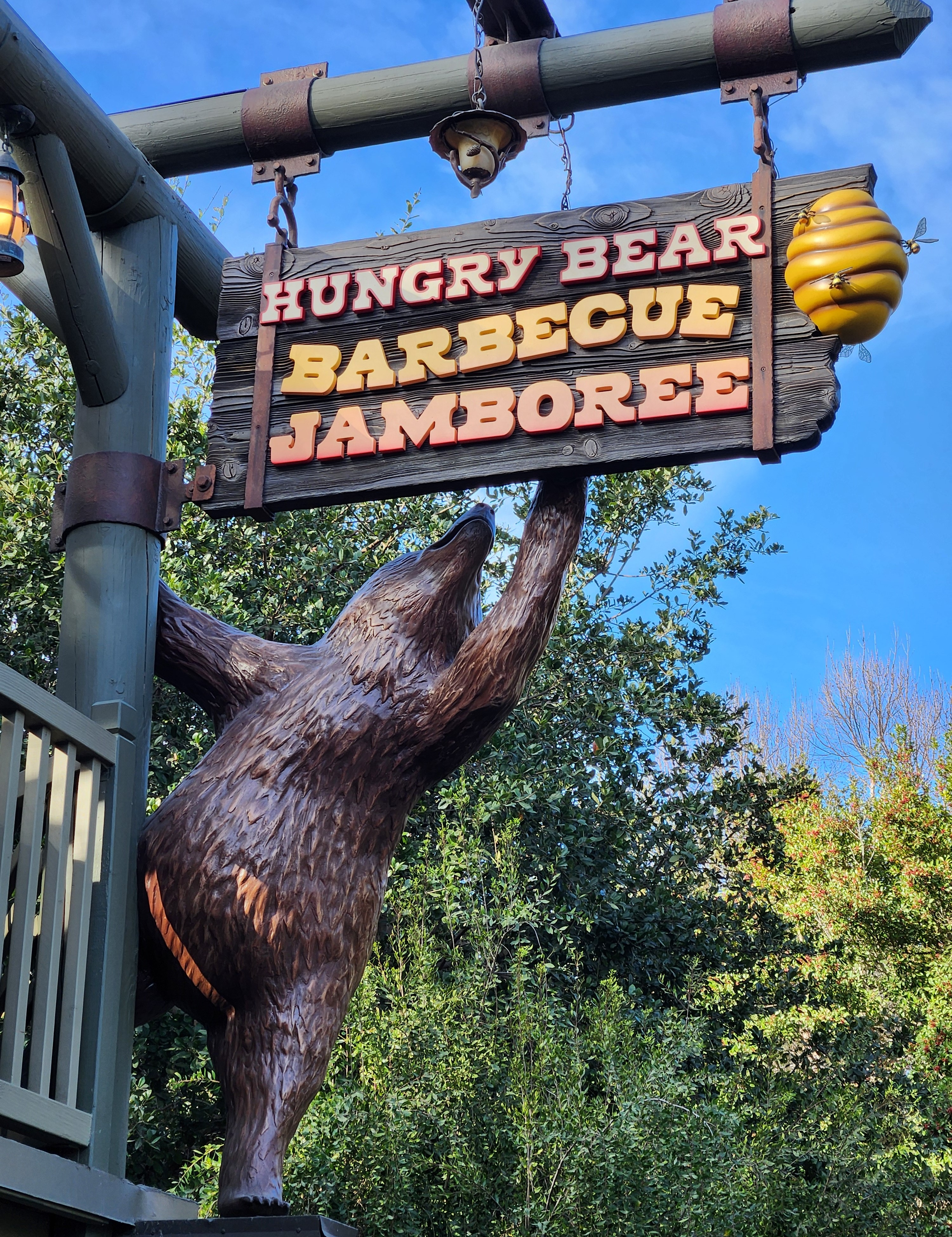
Hungry Bear Barbecue Jamboree sign, as seen from the pathway to Star Wars: Galaxy's Edge

- Hungry Bear Barbecue Jamboree
- Bayou Country Fruit Cart

=== Former restaurants ===
- Golden Bear Lodge (1972–1977)
- Hungry Bear Restaurant (1977–2024)
- Mile Long Bar (1972–1989)
- Brer Bar (1989–2003)

== Shops ==
- Ray's Berets
- Louis' Critter Club
- Pooh Corner
