= Disneyland =

Theme park in Anaheim, California, US

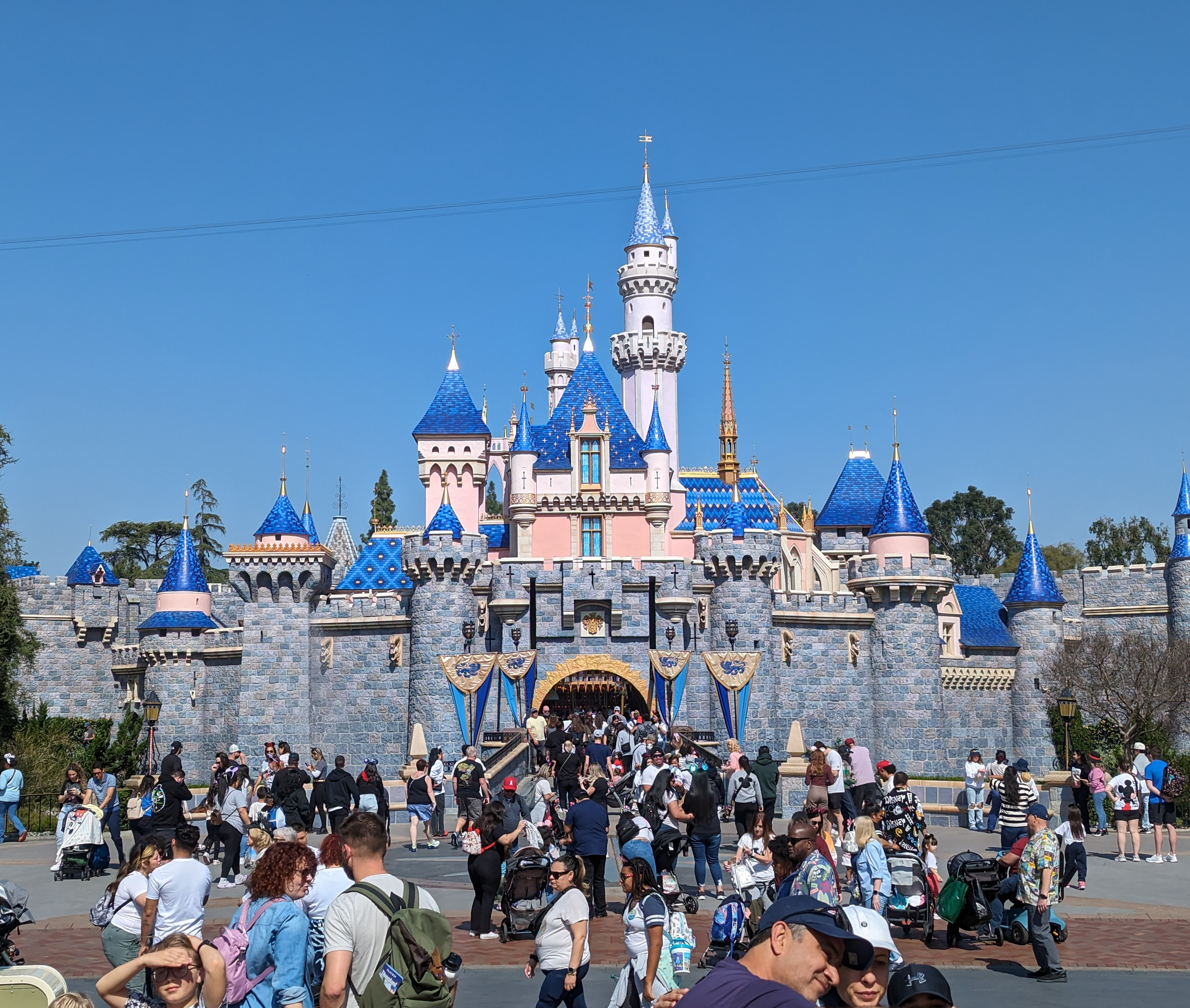
- The park's icon, Sleeping Beauty Castle, in 2024

- Location in Orange County Location in Greater Los Angeles Location in California Location in the United States
- Interactive map of Disneyland
- Location: Disneyland Resort, Anaheim, California, United States
- Coordinates: 33°49′N 117°55′W
- Status: Operating
- Opened: July 17, 1955; 71 years ago
- Owner: Disney Experiences (The Walt Disney Company)
- Operated by: Disneyland Resort
- Theme: Disney characters and fairy tales
- Slogan: The happiest place on earth Where Dreams Come True
- Operating season: Year-round
- Website: disneyland.disney.go.com/en-ca/destinations/disneyland/

Disneyland is a theme park at the Disneyland Resort in Anaheim, California, United States. It was the first theme park opened by the Walt Disney Company and the only one designed and constructed under the direct supervision of Walt Disney, opening on July 17, 1955.

Disney initially envisioned building a tourist attraction adjacent to his studios in Burbank to entertain fans who wished to visit; however, he soon realized that the proposed site was too small for the ideas that he had. After hiring the Stanford Research Institute to perform a feasibility study determining an appropriate site for his project, Disney bought a 160-acre (65 ha) site near Anaheim in 1953. The park was designed by a creative team hand-picked by Walt from internal and outside talent. Construction began in 1954 and the park was dedicated during a special televised press event on the ABC Television Network on July 17, 1955, a day before its public opening. The design and construction of Disneyland has been credited with revolutionizing the theme park industry and pioneering several features that would go on to influence theme park design, including a strict dedication to theming and cleanliness, the use of a berm to block views of the outside world, a hub-and-spoke layout, and the use of visual landmarks to draw guests' focus.

Since its opening, Disneyland has undergone many expansions and major renovations, including the additions of New Orleans Square in 1966, Bear Country in 1972 (known today as Bayou Country), Mickey's Toontown in 1993, and Star Wars: Galaxy's Edge in 2019. Additionally, the resort's second theme park Disney California Adventure opened in 2001 on the site of Disneyland's original parking lot.

Disneyland has had a larger cumulative attendance than any other theme park in the world, with 757 million visits since it opened (as of December 2021). In 2025, the park saw 17.406 million visitors, making it the second most visited amusement park in the world that year, behind Magic Kingdom, the very park it inspired.

== History ==
Original dedication

To all who come to this happy place: Welcome. Disneyland is your land. Here age relives fond memories of the past, and here youth may savor the challenge and promise of the future. Disneyland is dedicated to the ideals, the dreams, and the hard facts that have created America, with the hope that it will be a source of joy and inspiration to all the world.

— Walter E. Disney, July 17, 1955

=== 20th century ===
==== Origins ====
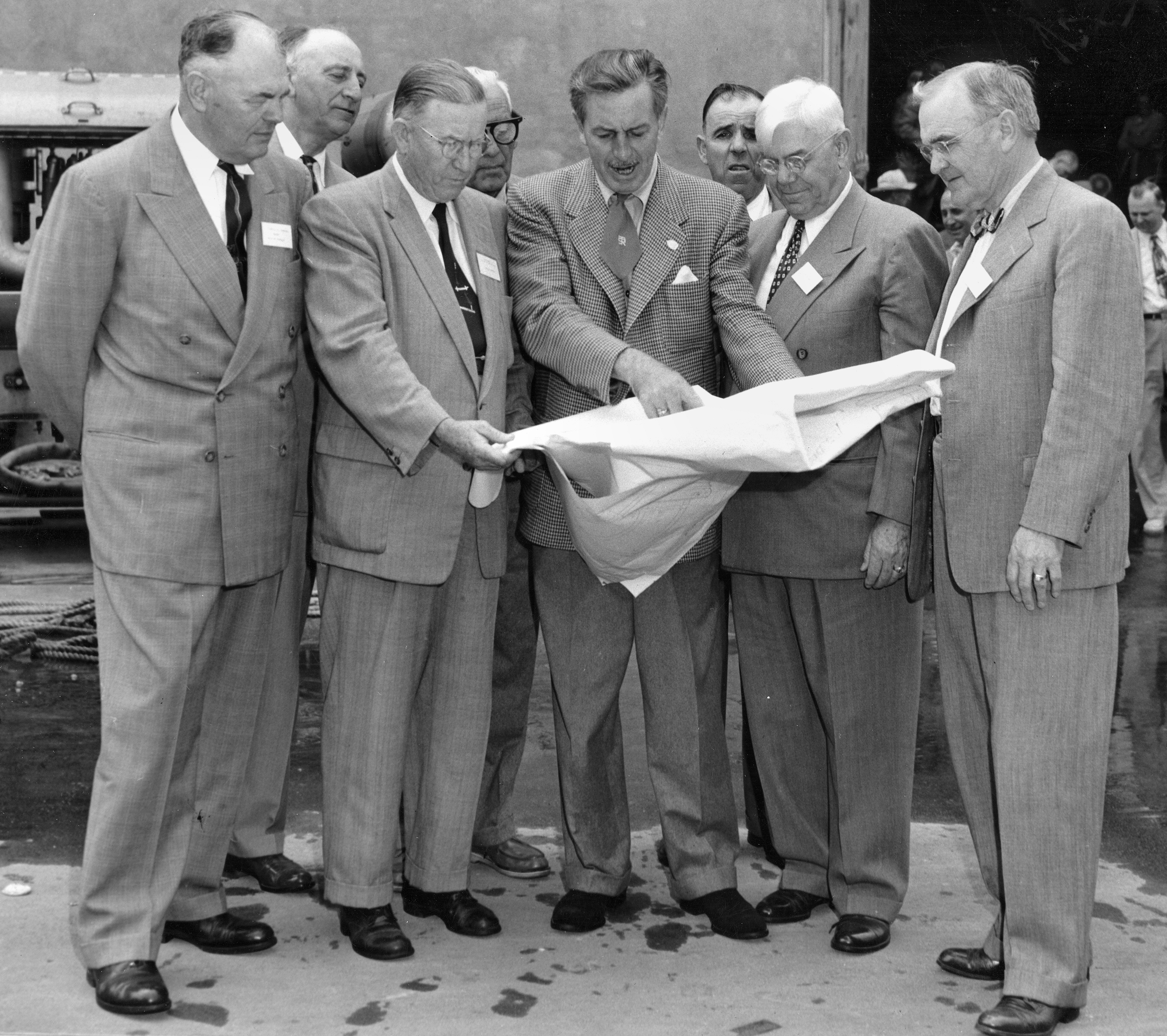
Walt Disney (center) showing Orange County officials plans for Disneyland's layout, December 1954

The concept for Disneyland began when Walt Disney was visiting Griffith Park in Los Angeles with his daughters Diane and Sharon. While watching them ride the merry-go-round, he came up with the idea of a place where adults and their children could go and have fun together, though this idea lay dormant for many years. The earliest documented draft of Disney's plans was sent as a memo to studio production designer Dick Kelsey on August 31, 1948, where it was referred to as a "Mickey Mouse Park", based on notes Disney made during his and Ward Kimball's trip to the Chicago Railroad Fair the same month, with a two-day stop in Henry Ford's Museum and Greenfield Village, a place with attractions like a Main Street and steamboat rides, which he had visited eight years earlier.

When people wrote letters to Disney to inquire about visiting the Walt Disney Studios, he realized that a functional movie studio had little to offer to visiting fans, and began to foster various ideas about building a site near the Burbank studios for tourists to visit. His ideas evolved to a small play park with a boat ride and other themed areas. The initial park concept, the Mickey Mouse Park, was originally planned for a sixteen-acre (6.5 ha) plot to the south, across Riverside Drive from the studio. Besides Greenfield Village and the Chicago Railroad Fair, Disney was also inspired by Tivoli Gardens in Denmark, Knott's Berry Farm, Colonial Williamsburg, the Century of Progress in Chicago, and the New York's World Fair of 1939.

His designers began working on concepts, though the project grew much larger than the land could hold. Disney hired C. V. Wood and Harrison Price of the Stanford Research Institute (SRI) to identify the proper area in which to position the planned theme park based on future population growth. Based on Price's analysis (for which he would be recognized as a Disney Legend in 2003), Disney acquired 160 acres (65 ha) of orange groves and walnut trees in Anaheim, southeast of Los Angeles in neighboring Orange County. The small Burbank site originally considered by Disney is now home to Walt Disney Animation Studios and ABC Studios.

Walt Disney's brother Roy O. Disney hired Wood away from SRI as executive vice president to undertake the task of actually building Disneyland. When Walt told Wood that he wanted a paddle steamer in Disneyland, it was Wood who introduced Walt to his good friend Joe Fowler, a retired U.S. Navy rear admiral. Fowler was then hired by Walt to "make engineering realities out of" all of Walt's ideas, not just a paddle wheeler—in other words, Fowler became the actual "construction boss" of Disneyland, charged with turning Disneyland from plans into reality in one year.

Difficulties in obtaining funding prompted Walt Disney to investigate new methods of fundraising, and he decided to create a show named Disneyland. It was broadcast on then-fledgling ABC. In return, the network agreed to help finance the park. For its first five years of operation, Disneyland was owned by Disneyland, Inc., which was jointly owned by Walt Disney Productions, Walt Disney, Western Publishing and ABC. In addition, Disney rented out many of the shops on Main Street, U.S.A. to outside companies. By 1960, Walt Disney Productions had bought out all other shares, but the partnership had already led to a lasting relationship with ABC which would eventually culminate in the Walt Disney Company's acquisition of ABC in the mid-1990s.

Construction began on July 16, 1954, and cost $17 million to complete (equivalent to $161 million in 2025). The park was opened one year and one day later. U.S. Route 101 (later Interstate 5) was under construction at the same time just north of the site; in preparation for the traffic Disneyland was expected to bring, two more lanes were added to the freeway before the park was finished.

==== Opening day ====
Disneyland was dedicated at an "International Press Preview" event held on Sunday, July 17, 1955, which was open only to invited guests and the media. Although 28,000 people attended the event, only about half of those were invitees, the rest having purchased counterfeit tickets, or snuck into the park by climbing over the fence. The following day, it opened to the public, featuring twenty attractions. The Special Sunday events, including the dedication, were televised nationwide and anchored by three of Walt Disney's friends from Hollywood: Art Linkletter, Bob Cummings, and Ronald Reagan. ABC broadcast the event live, during which many guests tripped over the television camera cables. In Frontierland, a camera caught Cummings kissing a dancer. When Disney started to read the plaque for Tomorrowland, he read partway when an off-camera technician stopped him, and Disney responded, "I thought I got a signal", and began the dedication again. At one point, while in Fantasyland, Linkletter tried to give coverage to Cummings, who was on the pirate ship. He was not ready and tried to give the coverage back to Linkletter, who had lost his microphone. Cummings then did a play-by-play of him trying to find it in front of Mr. Toad's Wild Ride.

Traffic was delayed on the two-lane Harbor Boulevard. It was a very hot day, and guests were frustrated with the large crowds. Among the many issues; rides broke down, restaurants ran out of food and drinks, the doors to Sleeping Beauty Castle were left unlocked allowing guests to see inside of its empty shell, and the Mark Twain Riverboat was overloaded with guests. Because of this, the park's first day of operation was known as "Black Sunday".

At the time, and during the lifetimes of Disney and his brother Roy, July 17 was considered a preview, with July 18 the official opening day. Since then, aided by memories of the television broadcast, the company has adopted July 17 as the official date, the one commemorated every year as Disneyland's birthday.

Within a year after Disneyland's opening, increasing friction between Disney and Wood resulted in Wood's termination. Most of the executives who led the development of Disneyland are now commemorated in window signs as proprietors of fictional businesses along Main Street, USA, with the exception of Wood.

==== 1950s and 1960s ====
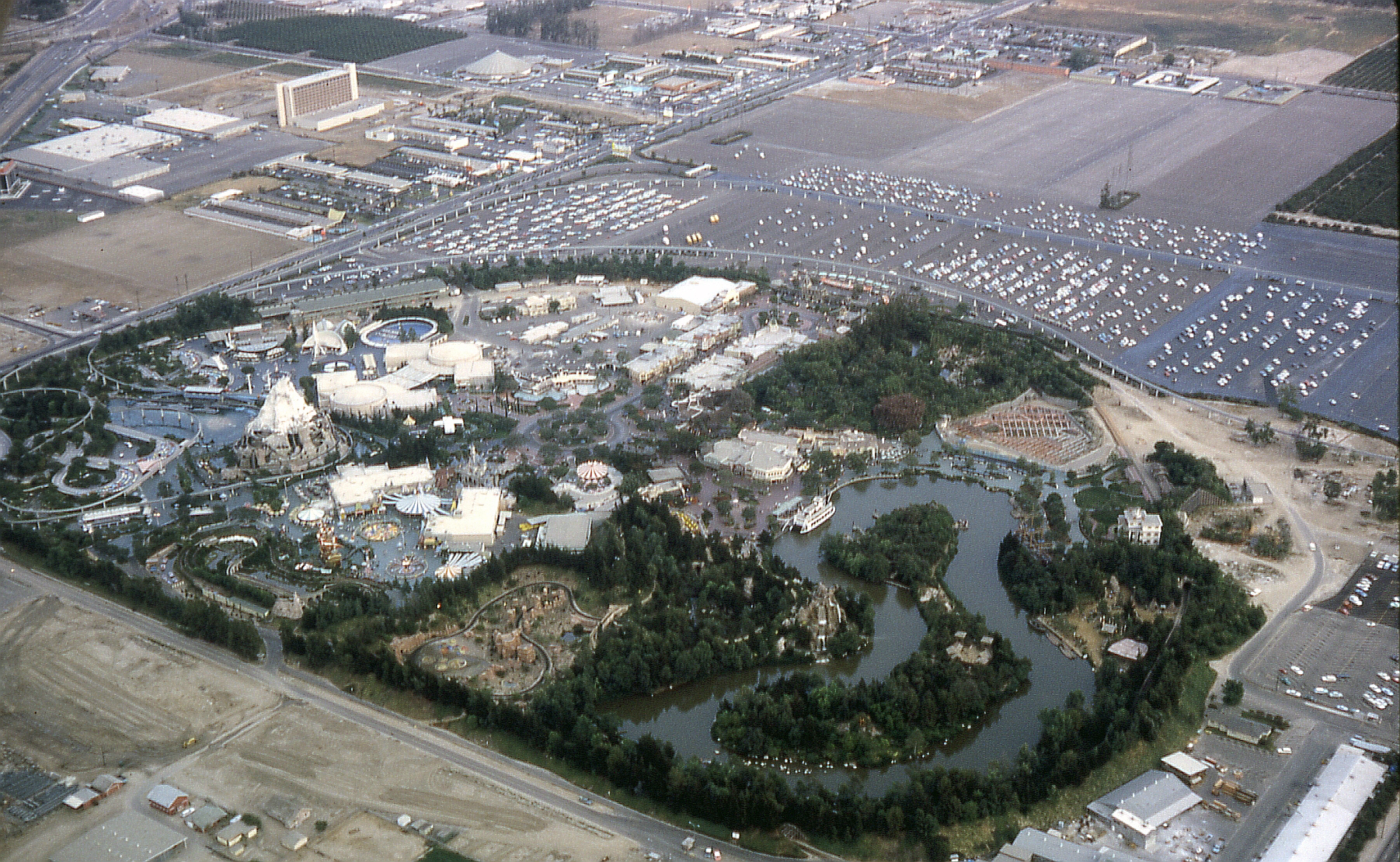
Disneyland aerial view, 1963, which includes the new Melody Land Theater at the top of the photo

In September 1959, Soviet First Secretary Nikita Khrushchev spent thirteen days in the United States, with two requests: to visit Disneyland and to meet John Wayne, Hollywood's top box-office draw. Due to the Cold War tension and security concerns, he was denied a visit to Disneyland. The Shah of Iran and Empress Farah were invited to Disneyland by Walt Disney in the early 1960s. There was concern over the lack of African American employees. As late as 1963, civil rights group the Congress of Racial Equality, was in discussions with Disneyland officials about hiring more black people, with Disneyland telling the group they would consider their requests. Unlike other amusement parks at the time, Disneyland was never racially segregated, and was open to all races since opening day.

As part of the Casa de Fritos operation at Disneyland, "Doritos" (Spanish for "little golden things") were created at the park to recycle old tortillas that would have been discarded. The Frito-Lay Company saw the popularity of the item and began selling them regionally in 1964, and then nationwide in 1966.

An all-time attendance record for the park was set on August 16, 1969, shortly after the opening of The Haunted Mansion, with 82,516 guests admitted in one day.

==== 1970s ====
On August 6, 1970, an estimated 300+ anti-war Yippies entered Disneyland in a planned protest against the Vietnam War. The protestors held grievances with specific aspects of the theme park itself, such as the Aunt Jemima-themed pancake restaurant in Frontierland and the park's association with Bank of America, a subject of controversy at the time for its lending to military contractors such as Boeing. The Yippies were met by an estimated 100 riot police who established lookouts within the park and another 300 on standby just outside of the entrance gates. Around 4:00 p.m., many of the Yippies occupied Tom Sawyer Island, purportedly smoking cannabis and causing cast members to halt park guests from boarding rafts to the island. An hour later, the group of Yippies converged at Main Street, U.S.A. and became confrontational with other park guests and riot police after tearing down patriotic bunting while unfurling Viet Cong and Youth International Party flags. Standby riot police entered and the park was evacuated around 5:00 p.m. when some of the insurgents approached the park's Bank of America branch, sparking concern that the building could be burned in a similar fashion to the arson of a Bank of America in Isla Vista in February 1970. Police arrested 23 park guests and it was only the second unexpected early closure in park history, the first being in response to the assassination of John F. Kennedy in 1963. The incident was cited as a clash of the park management's perceived appeal to tradition following the death of Walt Disney and the growing counterculture movement among young people in the United States.

Despite the opening of the more expansive Walt Disney World resort in 1971, Disneyland continued to set attendance records and maintained its status as a major tourist attraction. In 1972, the Bear Country land was opened and the Main Street Electrical Parade was introduced.

Disneyland underwent several changes in preparation for the United States Bicentennial. In 1974, Walt Disney's Carousel of Progress was replaced with America Sings, an Audio-Animatronics theater show featuring the history of American music. America on Parade debuted in 1975 and ran through 1976 in celebration of the bicentennial.

Several of the park's earliest attractions received major changes or were replaced in the mid-to-late 1970s. The Flight to the Moon attraction was rethemed as Mission to Mars in March 1975, five years after Apollo 11 had successfully landed humans on the Moon. Construction of Space Mountain began that same year adjacent to the new Mission to Mars attraction but was delayed by El Niño-related weather complications. The ride opened in 1977 to much acclaim as lines would often stretch all the way to Main Street, U.S.A. The final major change of the decade came in 1977 when the slow-paced Mine Train Through Nature's Wonderland was closed and replaced by the similarly themed Big Thunder Mountain Railroad roller coaster in 1979.

==== 1980s ====
Fantasyland was closed for refurbishment in 1982 and reopened to the public in 1983 as "New Fantasyland".

In September 1984, several hundred park employees went on strike due to disagreements over the terms of a new labor contract. The labor dispute, which was the largest in the park's history, ended the following month.

On December 5, 1985, to celebrate Disneyland's 30th year in operation, one million balloons were launched along the streets bordering Disneyland as part of the Skyfest Celebration.

==== 1990s ====
In the late 1990s, work began to expand the one-park, one-hotel property. Disneyland Park, the Disneyland Hotel, the site of the original parking lot, and acquired surrounding properties were earmarked to become part of the Disneyland Resort. At that time, the property saw the addition of the Disney California Adventure theme park, a shopping, dining and entertainment complex named Downtown Disney, a remodeled Disneyland Hotel, the construction of Disney's Grand Californian Hotel & Spa, and the acquisition and re-branding of the Pan Pacific Hotel as Disney's Paradise Pier Hotel (renamed to Pixar Place Hotel in 2024). The park was renamed "Disneyland Park" to distinguish it from the larger complex under construction. Because the existing parking lot (south of Disneyland) was repurposed by these projects, the six-level, 10,250-space Mickey and Friends parking structure was constructed in the northwest corner. Upon completion in 2000, it was the largest parking structure in the United States.

The park's management team during the mid-1990s was a source of controversy among fans and employees. In an effort to boost profits, various changes were begun by then-executives Cynthia Harriss and Paul Pressler. While their initiatives provided a short-term increase in shareholder returns, they drew widespread criticism for their lack of foresight. The retail backgrounds of Harriss and Pressler led to a gradual shift in Disneyland's focus from attractions to merchandising. Outside consultants McKinsey & Company were brought in to help streamline operations, resulting in many changes and cutbacks. After nearly a decade of deferred maintenance, the original park was showing signs of neglect. Fans of the park decried the perceived decline in customer value and park quality and rallied for the dismissal of the management team.

=== 21st century ===
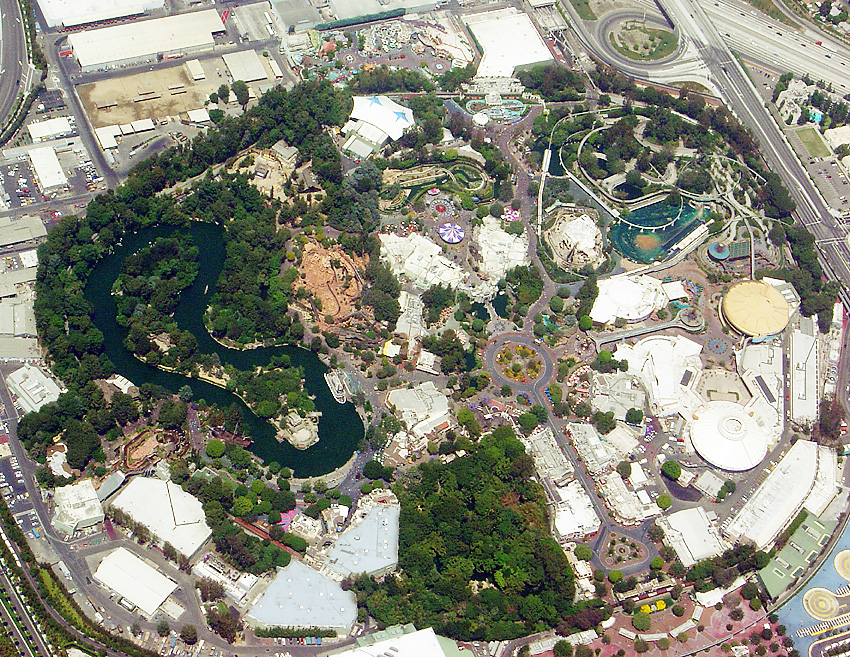
An aerial view of Disneyland in 2004

==== 2000s ====
Matt Ouimet, the former president of the Disney Cruise Line, was promoted to assume leadership of the Disneyland Resort in late 2003. Shortly afterward, he selected Greg Emmer as Senior Vice President of Operations. Emmer was a long-time Disney cast member who had worked at Disneyland in his youth prior to moving to Florida and held multiple executive leadership positions at the Walt Disney World Resort. Ouimet set about reversing certain trends, especially concerning cosmetic maintenance and a return to the original infrastructure maintenance schedule, in hopes of restoring Disneyland's former safety record. Similarly to Walt Disney, Ouimet and Emmer could often be seen walking the park during business hours with members of their respective staff, wearing cast member name badges, standing in line for attractions, and welcoming guests' comments. In July 2006, Ouimet left The Walt Disney Company to become president of Starwood. Soon after, Ed Grier, executive managing director of Walt Disney Attractions Japan, was named president of the resort. In October 2009, Grier announced his retirement, and was replaced by George Kalogridis.

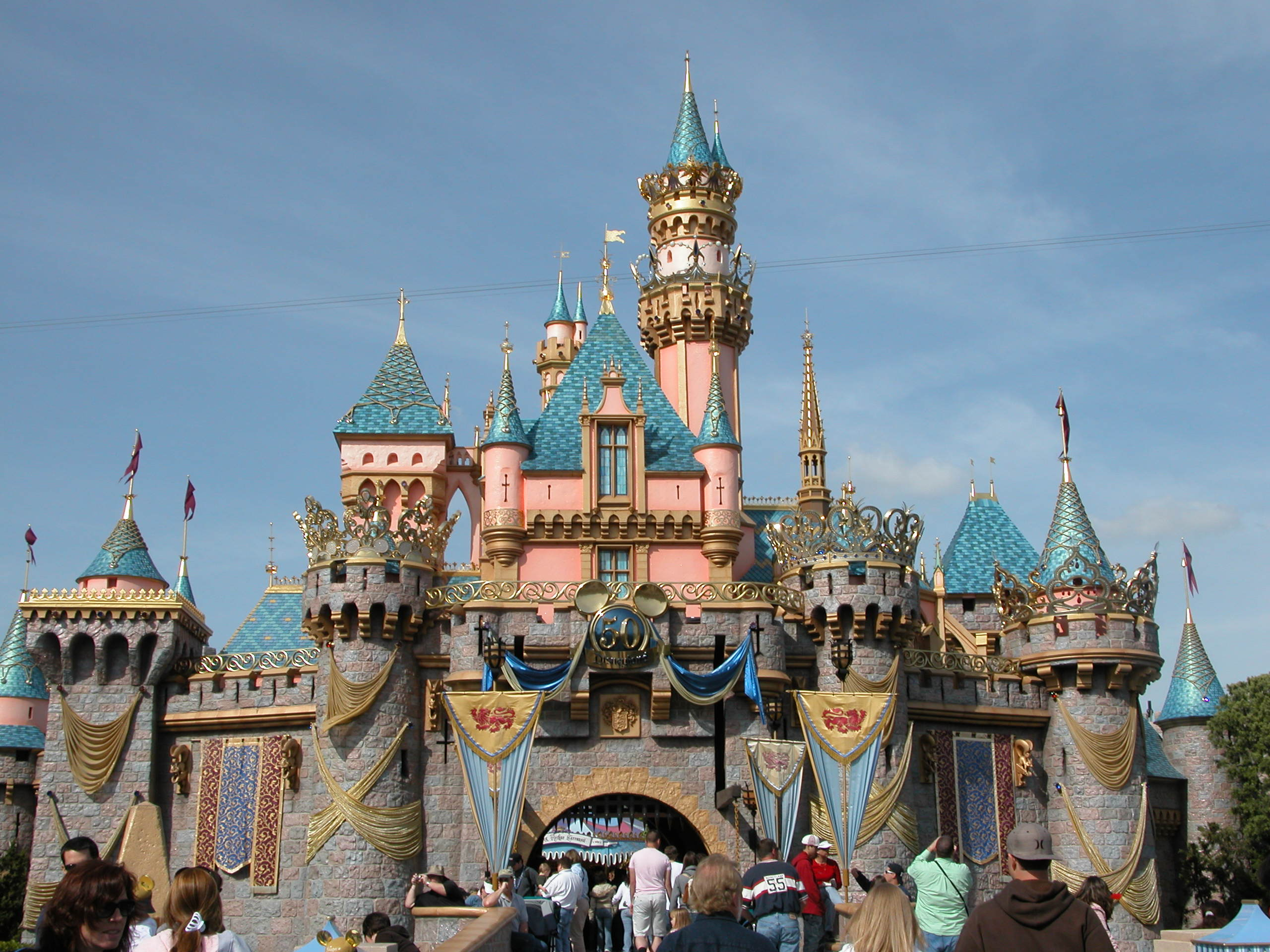
The "Happiest Homecoming on Earth" celebrated the 50th anniversary of the theme park. Sleeping Beauty Castle was altered for the occasion.

The "Happiest Homecoming on Earth" was an eighteen-month-long celebration (held through 2005 and 2006) of the fiftieth anniversary of Disneyland Park, also celebrating Disneyland's milestone throughout Disney parks worldwide. In 2004, the park underwent major renovations in preparation, restoring many attractions, notably Space Mountain, Jungle Cruise, the Haunted Mansion, Pirates of the Caribbean, and Walt Disney's Enchanted Tiki Room. Attractions that had been in the park on opening day had one ride vehicle painted gold, and the park was decorated with fifty Golden Mickey Ears. The celebration started on May 5, 2005, and ended on September 30, 2006, and was followed by the "Year of a Million Dreams" celebration, lasting twenty-seven months and ending on December 31, 2008.

==== 2010s ====
Beginning on January 1, 2010, Disney Parks hosted the Give a Day, Get a Disney Day volunteer program, in which Disney encouraged people to volunteer with a participating charity and receive a free Disney Day at either a Disneyland Resort or Walt Disney World park. On March 9, 2010, Disney announced that it had reached its goal of one million volunteers and ended the promotion to anyone who had not yet registered and signed up for a specific volunteer situation. Michael Colgalzier was appointed president from 2013 to 2018, when he became president of Disney Parks International.

In July 2015, Disneyland celebrated its 60th Diamond Celebration anniversary. The park introduced the Paint the Night parade and Disneyland Forever fireworks show, and Sleeping Beauty Castle was decorated in diamonds with a large "60" logo. The Diamond Celebration concluded in September 2016 and the whole decoration of the anniversary was removed around Halloween 2016.

==== 2020s ====
===== COVID-19 closure =====
Disneyland Park, along with Disney California Adventure, Downtown Disney, and the resort hotels, closed indefinitely starting March 14, 2020, in response to the COVID-19 pandemic. After nearly four months of closure, Downtown Disney reopened on July 9, 2020. The parks had been scheduled to reopen on Disneyland's 65th anniversary on July 17, 2020, but due to rising cases in California, the parks' reopening was once again postponed. It was expected to stay closed until at least December 31, 2020. In February 2021, Disneyland announced a limited-capacity ticketed event called "A Touch of Disney", which would offer guests to shop at stores and enjoy eateries around the park from March 18 through April 19, 2021.

On March 5, 2021, it was announced by the California Department of Public Health that Disneyland could reopen with capacity restrictions beginning April 1, 2021. The following week, then-Disney CEO Bob Chapek said that the company was planning on officially reopening the park in late April 2021. Disneyland along with Disney California Adventure officially reopened on April 30, 2021, with limited capacity and social distancing/mask guidelines in effect.

On June 15, 2021, Disneyland, Disney California Adventure and other theme parks in California were permitted to return to full capacity with most COVID-19 pandemic restrictions lifted per California governor Gavin Newsom's Blueprint for a Safer Economy phased re-opening. Prior to this, Disneyland was operating at reduced guest capacity since it re-opened on April 30, 2021, after 13 months of closure due to the pandemic.

===== 2021–present =====
On March 25, 2021, the company announced a plan titled DisneylandForward to expand the park with more rides, restaurants, and shops with the Anaheim City Council expected to receive the development plans for approval by 2023. The plan was approved by the Anaheim City Council on May 7, 2024.

On January 27, 2023, Disneyland kicked off the year-long celebration of the centennial of the Walt Disney Company, Disney100. Disneyland Park introduced the Mickey & Minnie's Runaway Railway attraction and Wondrous Journeys fireworks show.

On April 13, 2023, it was announced that Disneyland would be holding its first official "Pride Nite", supporting the LGBTQ community. This comes 25 years after the first celebrated 'Gay Day' at Disneyland, which is identical to the Gay Days at Walt Disney World celebration.

In May 2023, a video featuring an employee positioned in Fantasyland at the Bibbidi Bobbidi Boutique as one of the Fairy Godmother's apprentices was published on TikTok, generating both criticism from conservative commentators and support from fans on social media due to the employee being male-presenting.

On May 18, 2024, Disneyland character performers voted to join the Actors' Equity Association, with 79% voting in favor. The decision marked the first time these workers have unionized since Disneyland's opening in 1955.

== Park layout and attractions ==
Disneyland layout. Main Street, U.S.A. (cyan), Adventureland (orange), New Orleans Square (yellow), Frontierland (green), Bayou Country (purple), Mickey's Toontown (navy), Star Wars: Galaxy's Edge (red), Fantasyland (magenta) and Tomorrowland (blue)

Disneyland Park consists of nine themed "lands" and occupies over 100 acres (40 ha). The park opened with Main Street, USA, Adventureland, Frontierland, Fantasyland, and Tomorrowland, and has since added New Orleans Square in 1966, Bear Country in 1972 (now known as Bayou Country), Mickey's Toontown in 1993, and Star Wars: Galaxy's Edge in 2019. In 1957, Holidayland opened to the public with a nine-acre (3.6 ha) recreation area including a circus and baseball diamond, and was closed in late 1961. Throughout the park are "Hidden Mickeys", representations of Mickey Mouse heads inserted subtly into the design of attractions and environmental decor. An elevated berm supports the 3 ft (914 mm) narrow gauge Disneyland Railroad that runs in a loop around most of the park. However, the two most recent themed land additions, Mickey's Toontown and Star Wars: Galaxy's Edge, lie beyond both the berm and the railroad's loop.

Lands of Disneyland

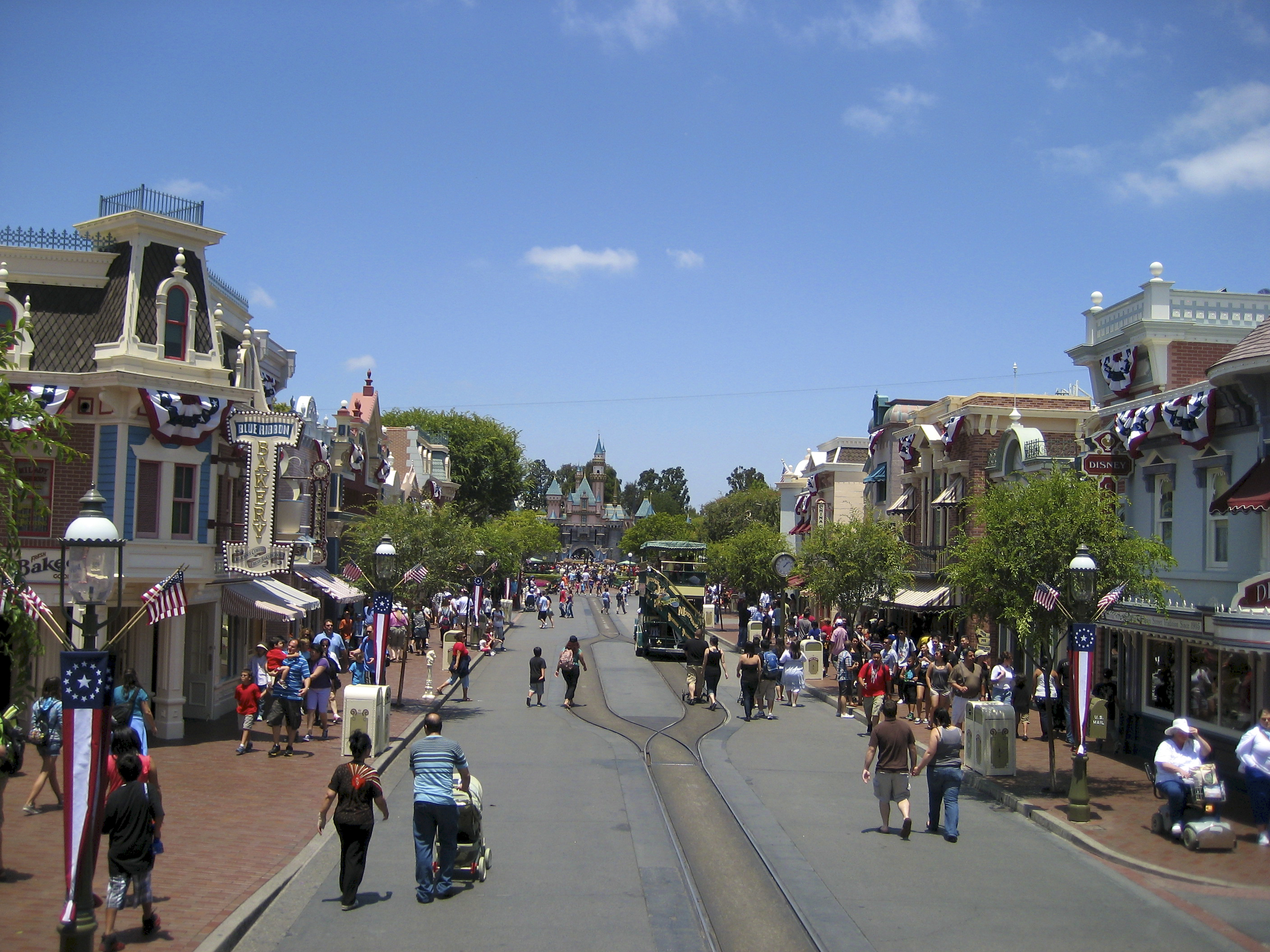
Main Street, USA
(2010)

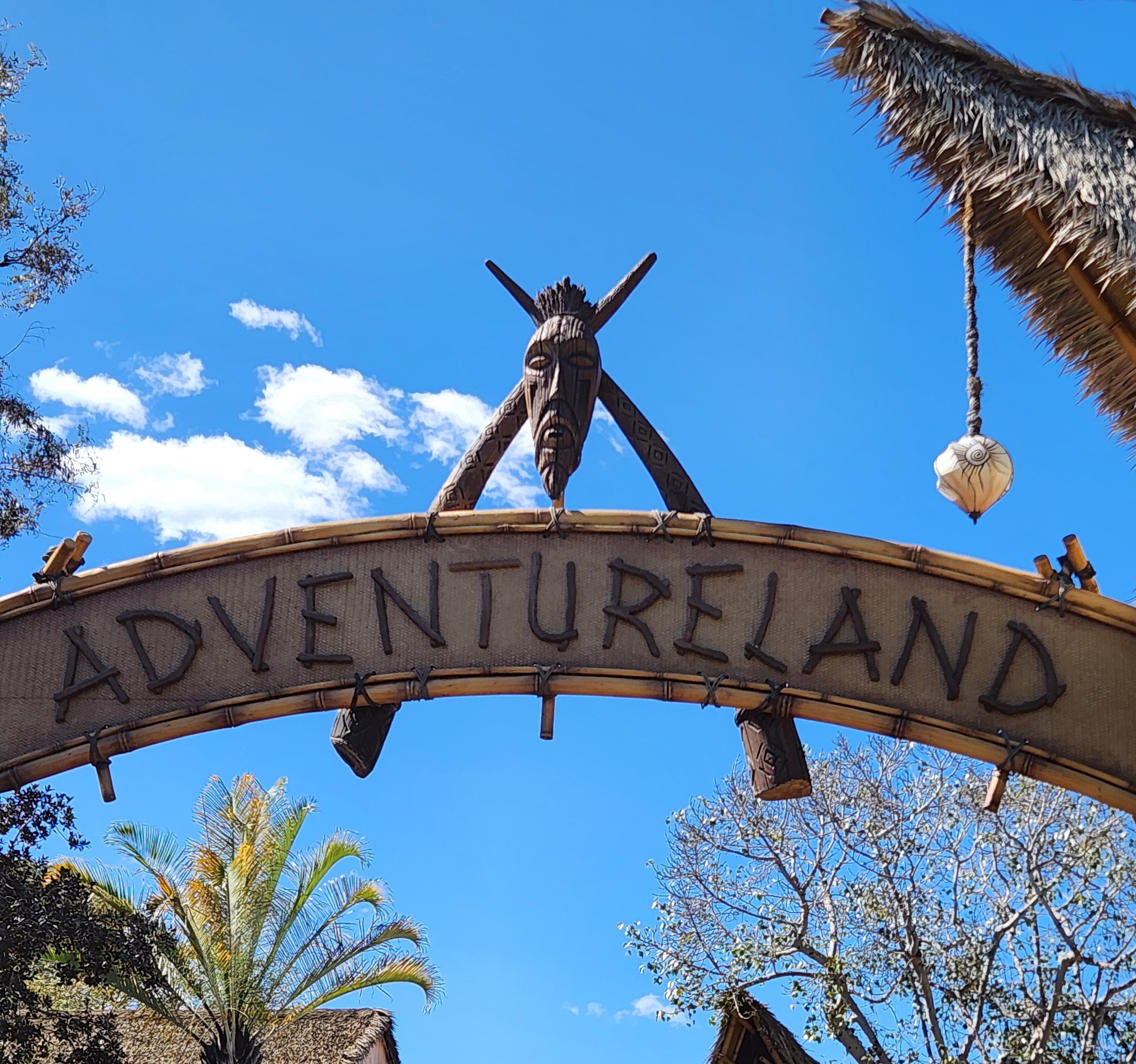
Adventureland entrance

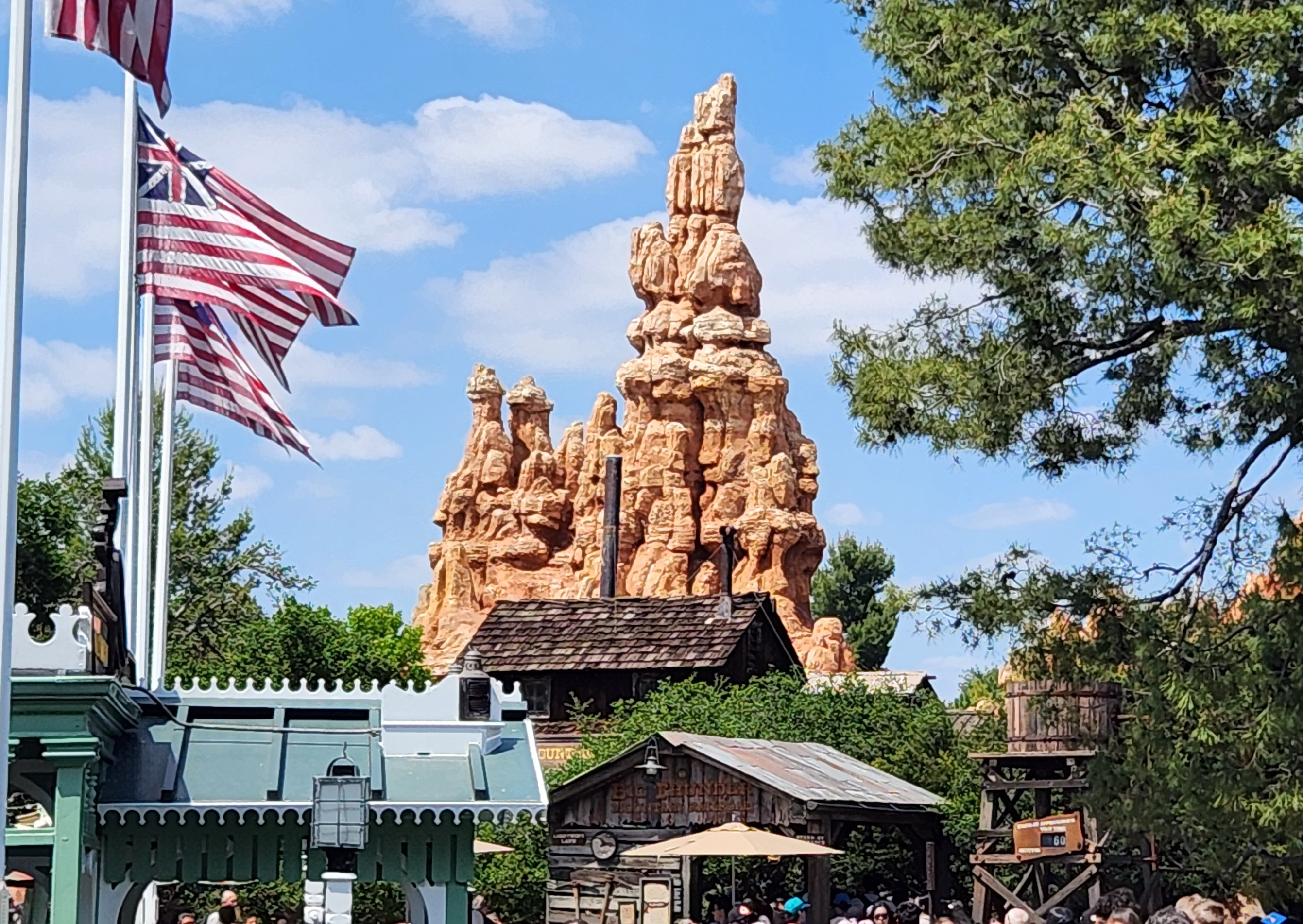
Frontierland
(Big Thunder Mountain Railroad)

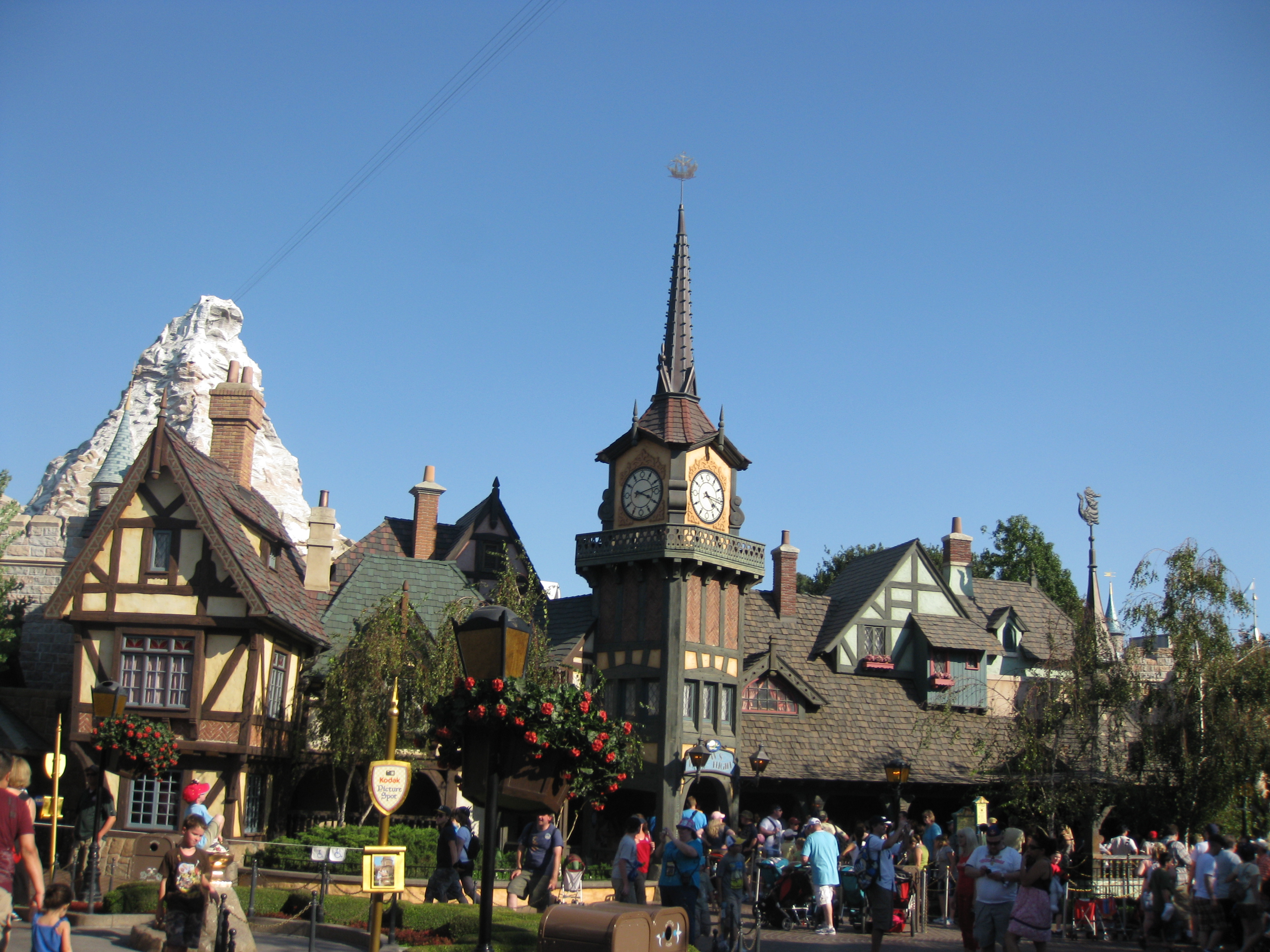
Fantasyland
(Peter Pan's Flight in the foreground and the Matterhorn Bobsleds in the background)

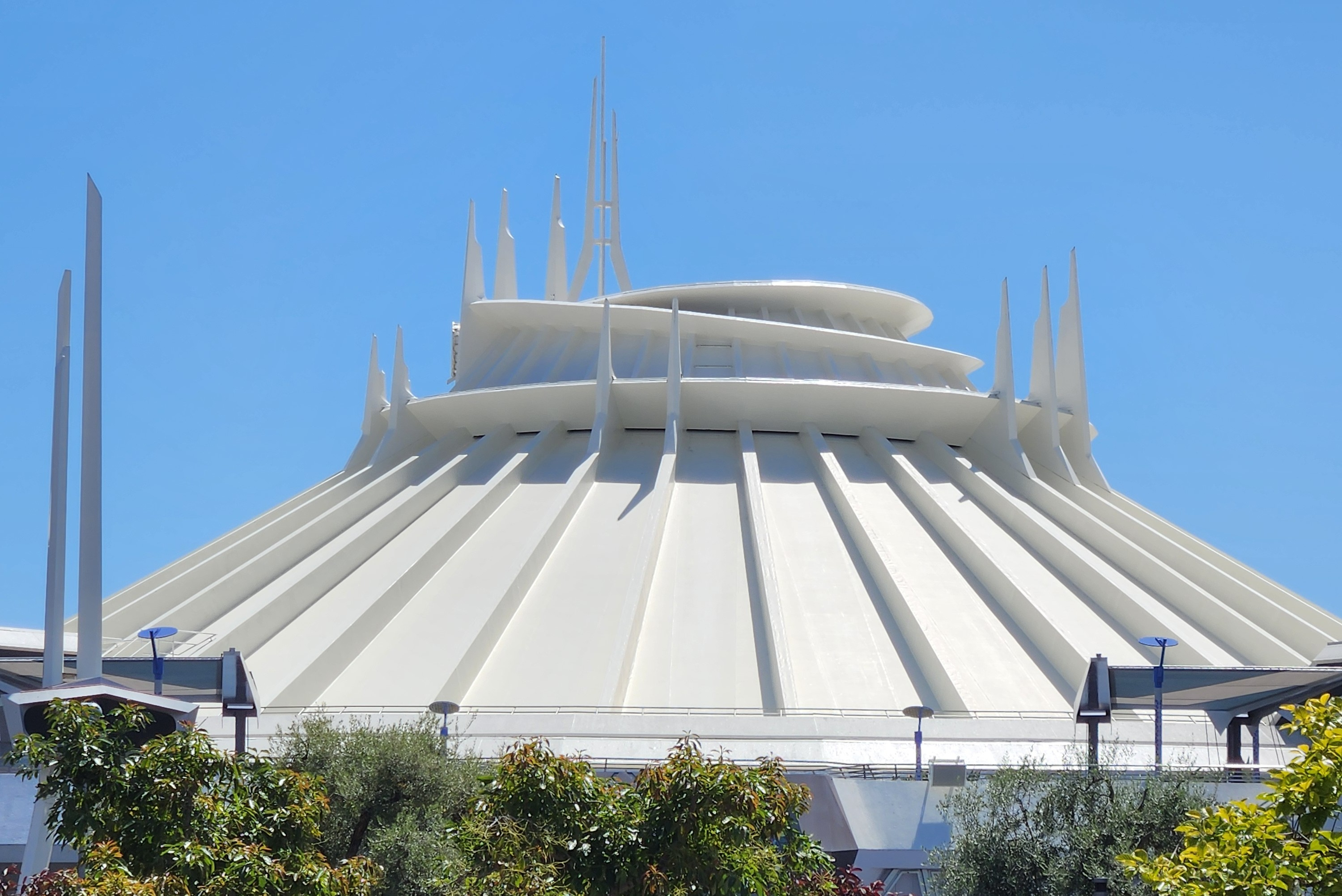
Tomorrowland
(Space Mountain)

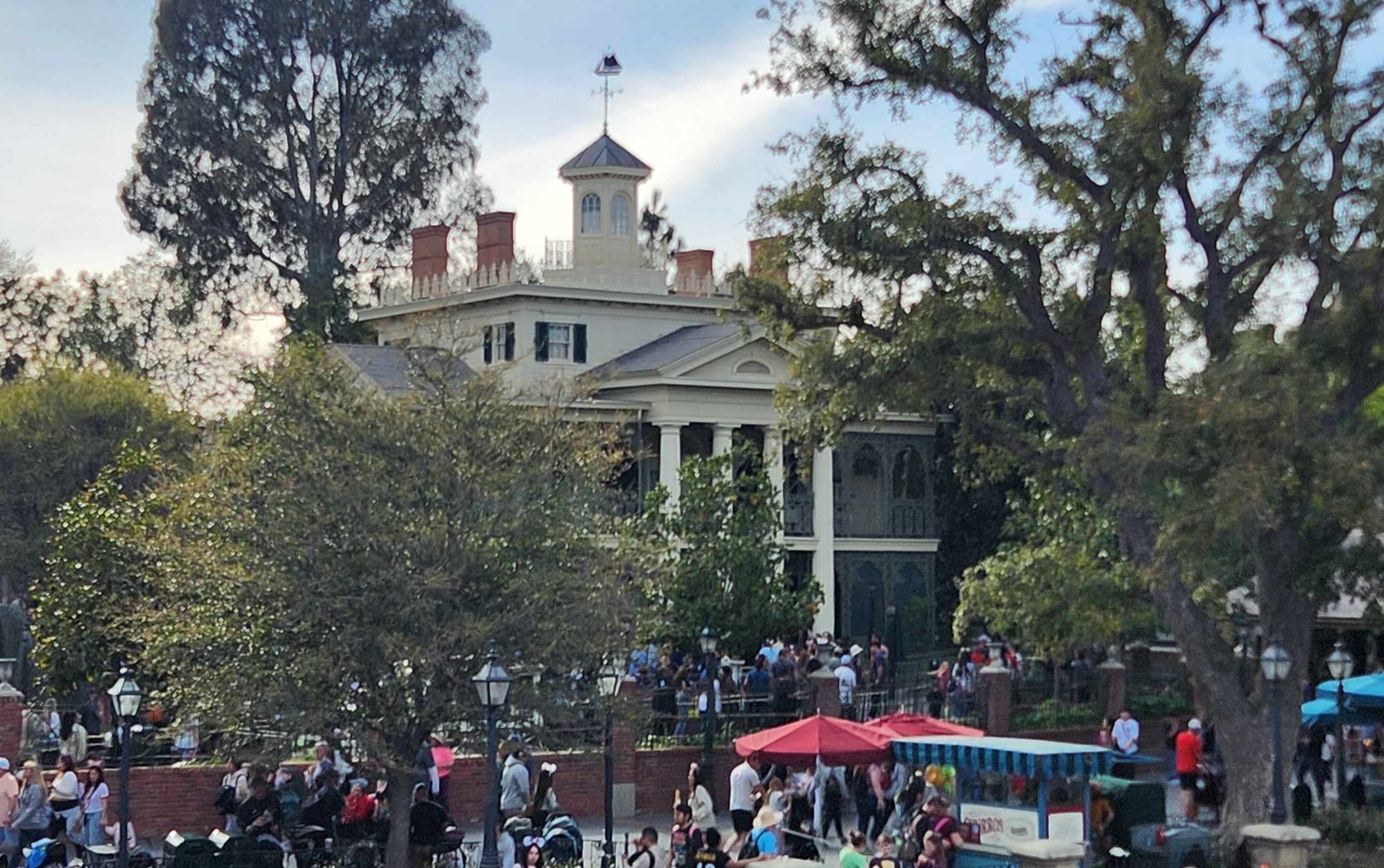
New Orleans Square
(the Haunted Mansion)

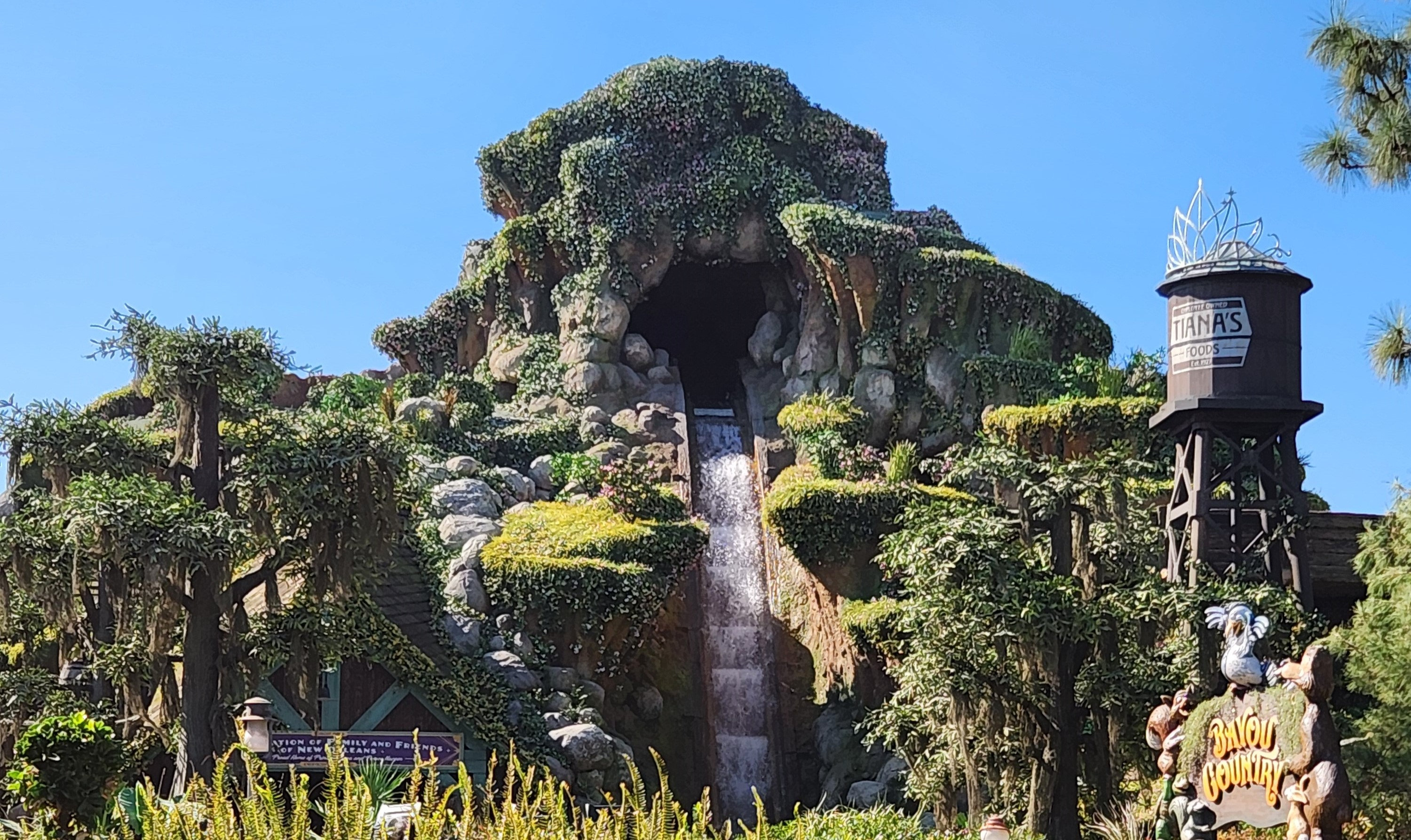
Bayou Country
(Tiana's Bayou Adventure)

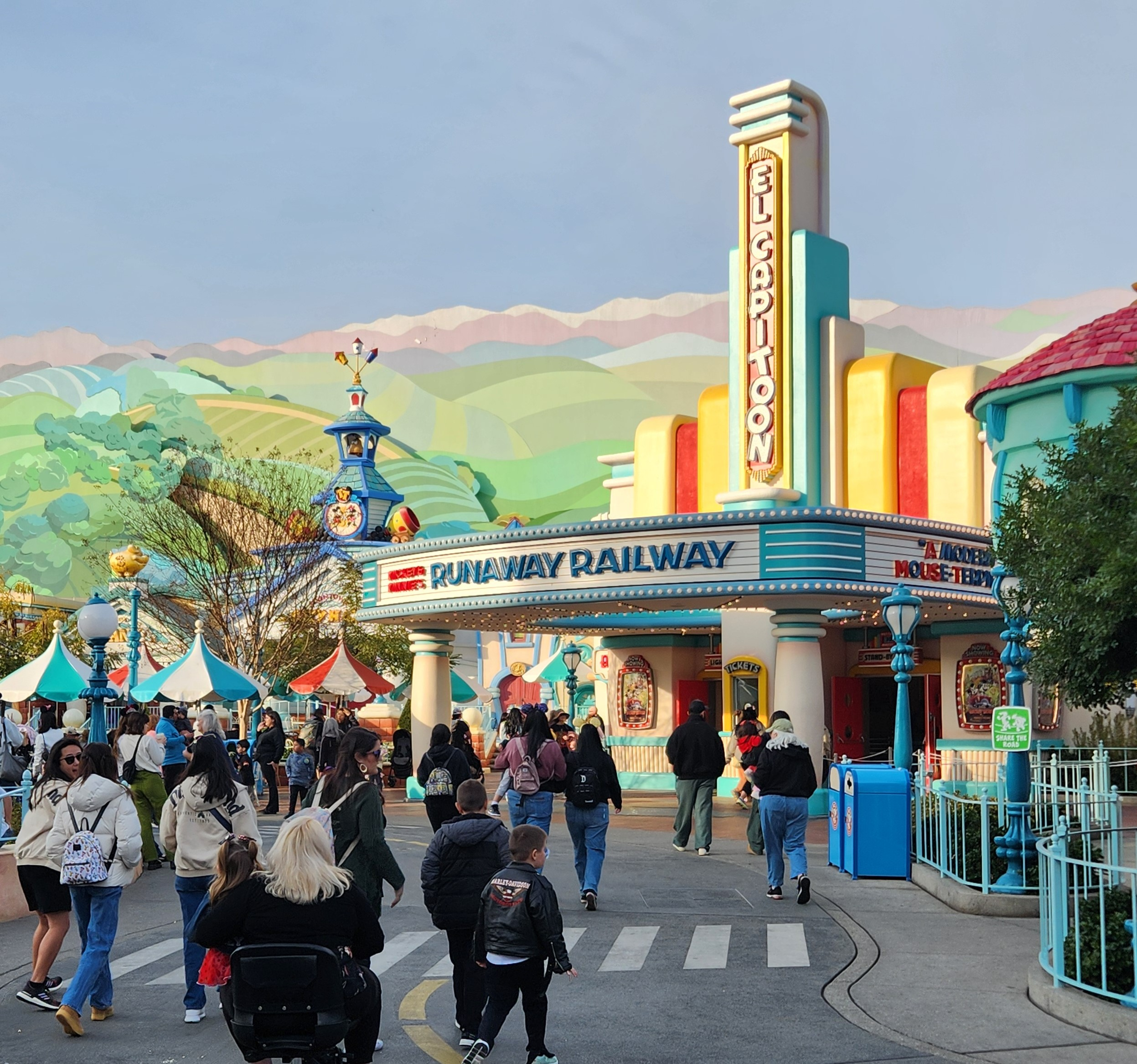
Mickey's Toontown
(Mickey & Minnie's Runaway Railway)

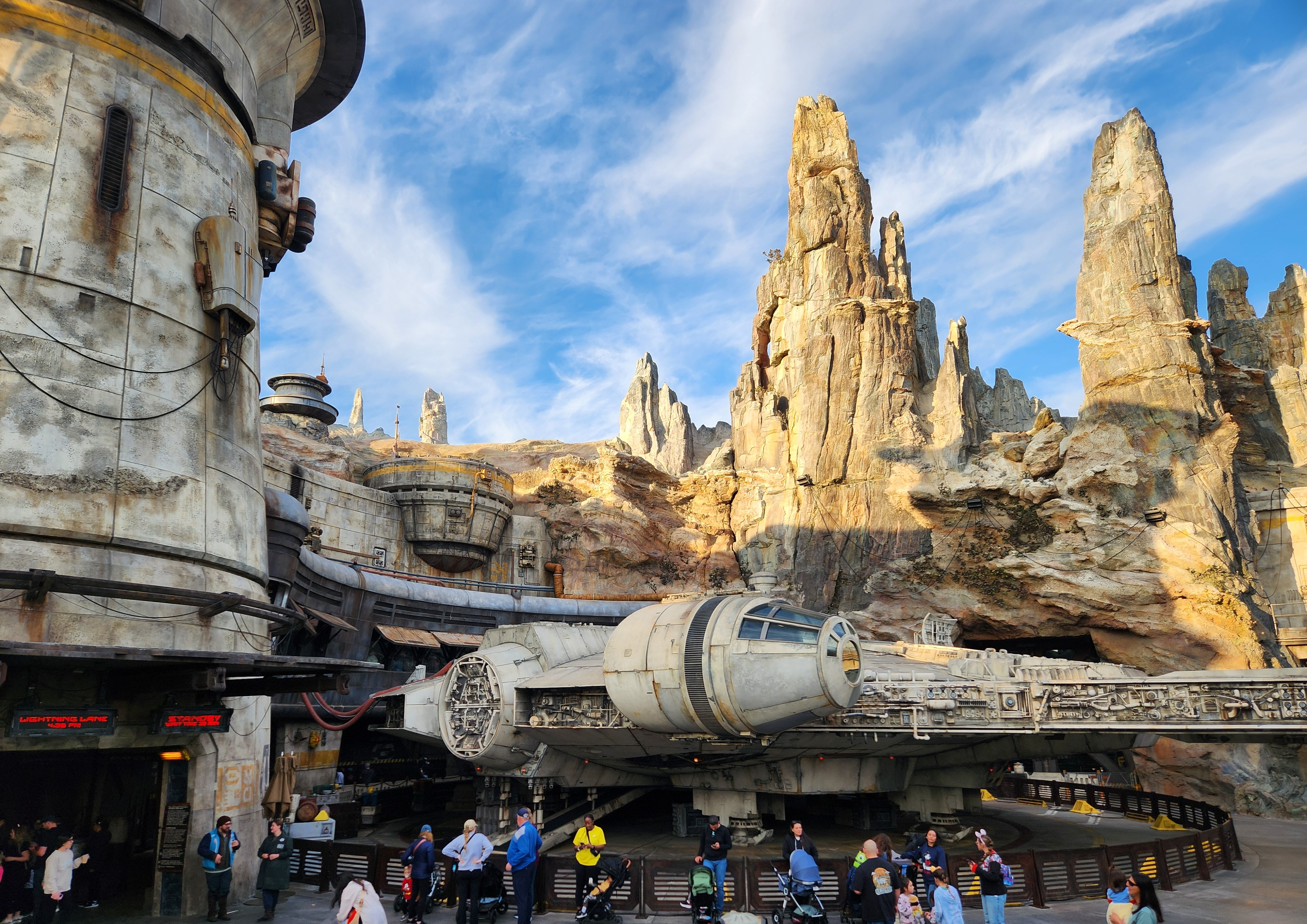
Star Wars: Galaxy's Edge
(Star Wars: Millennium Falcon – Smugglers Run)

=== Main Street, USA ===
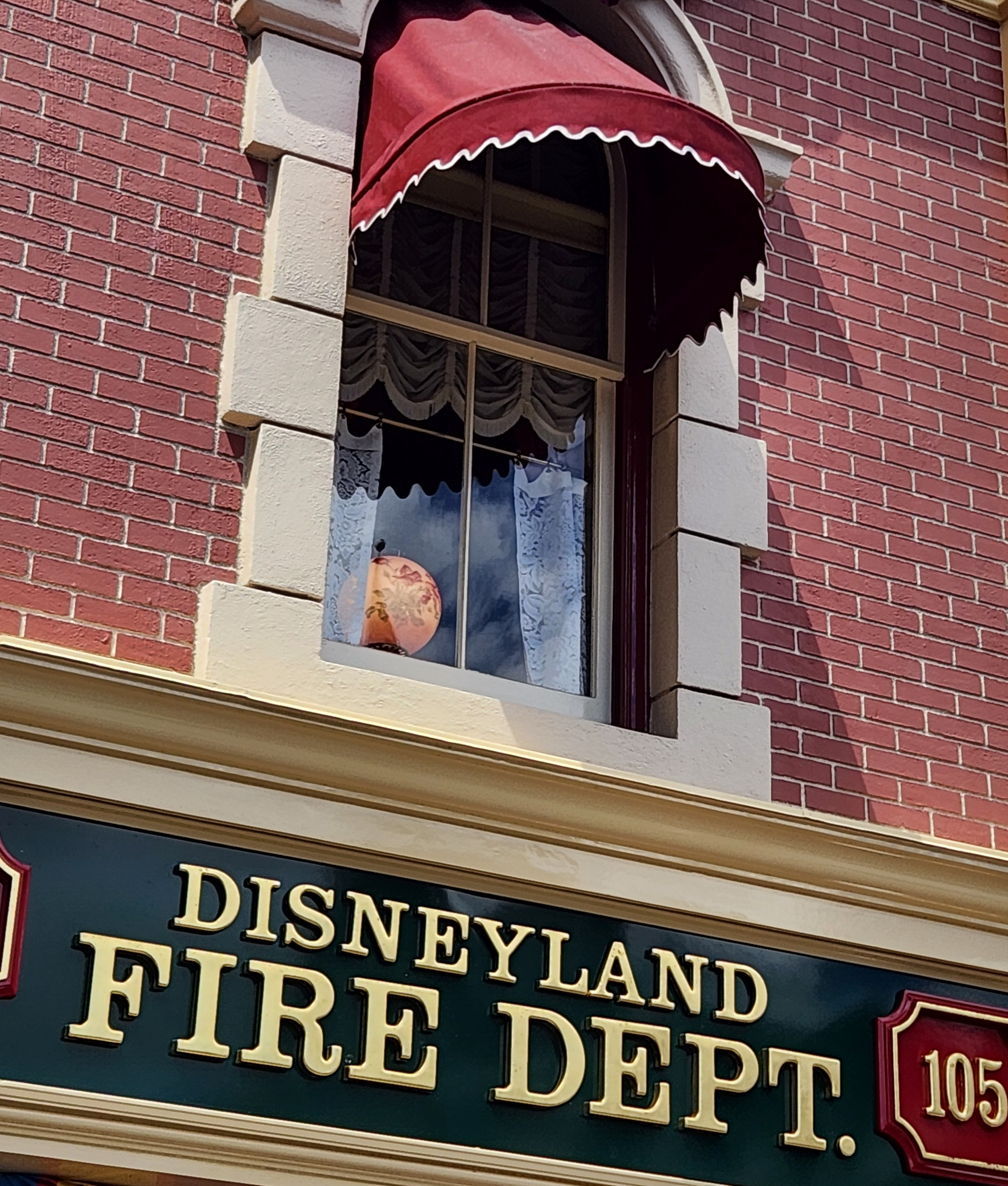
The window of Walt Disney's personal apartment, located on the second-story of the firehouse building

Main Street, USA is a romanticized version of a typical Midwest town of the early 20th century, and took much inspiration from Walt Disney's hometown, Marceline, Missouri. Main Street, USA has a train station, town square, cinema, city hall, firehouse with a steam-powered pump engine, emporium, shops, arcades, double-decker bus, horse-drawn streetcar, and jitneys. The second-story of the firehouse is where Disney had his personal apartment, where it still exists today, off-limits to the public. Main Street is also home to The Disney Gallery and the Opera House which showcases Great Moments with Mr. Lincoln and Walt Disney – A Magical Life. At the far end of Main Street, USA is Sleeping Beauty Castle, the Partners statue, and the Central Plaza (also known as the Hub), which is a portal to most of the themed lands: the entrance to Fantasyland is by way of a drawbridge across a moat and through the castle. Adventureland, Frontierland, and Tomorrowland are on both sides of the castle. The lands that are not directly connected to the Central Plaza are; New Orleans Square, Bayou Country, Mickey's Toontown, and Star Wars: Galaxy's Edge.

The design of Main Street, USA uses the technique of forced perspective to create an illusion of height. Buildings along Main Street are built at 3/4 scale on the first level, then 5/8 on the second story, and 1/2 scale on the third—reducing the scale by 1/8 each level up.

=== Adventureland ===
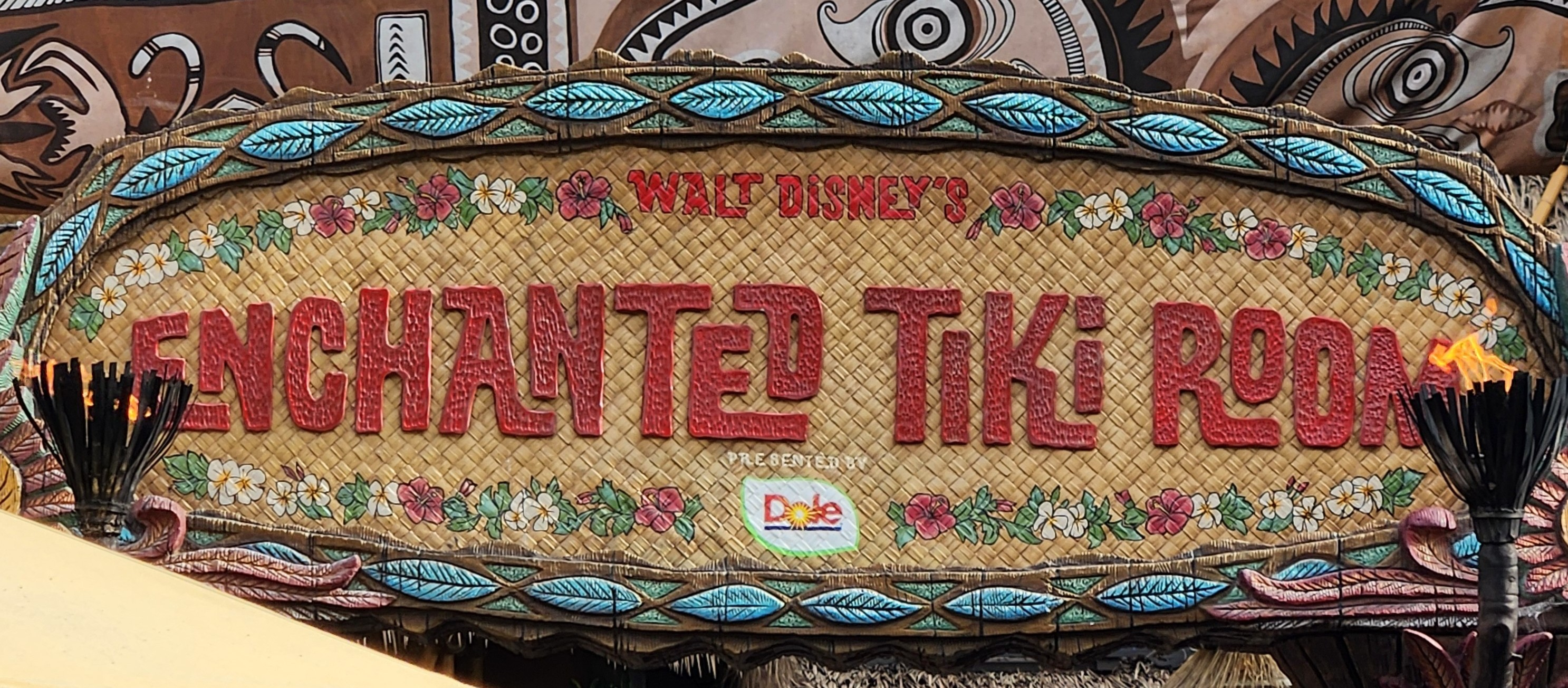
Walt Disney's Enchanted Tiki Room was the first attraction to use Audio-Animatronics

Adventureland is designed to recreate the feel of an exotic tropical place in a far-off region of the world. Attractions include Jungle Cruise, Indiana Jones Adventure, and Adventureland Treehouse, which is inspired by Walt Disney's 1960 film Swiss Family Robinson. Walt Disney's Enchanted Tiki Room, which opened in 1963, was the first attraction to employ Audio-Animatronics.

=== Frontierland ===
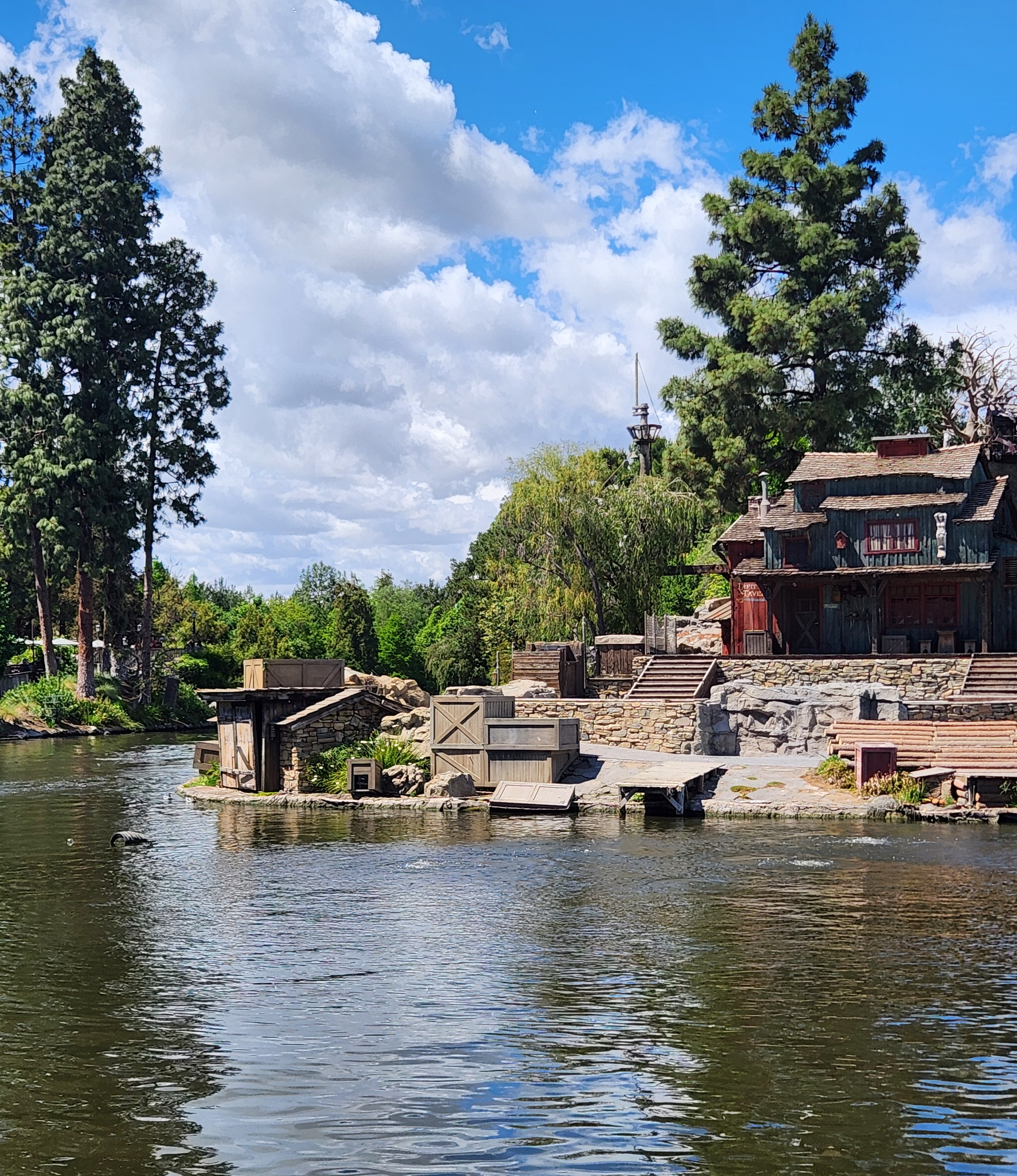
Rivers of America and Tom Sawyer Island

Frontierland is a romanticized portrayal of the American frontier, recreates the setting of pioneer days, and also features animatronic Native Americans along the banks of the Rivers of America. Entertainment and attractions include Big Thunder Mountain Railroad, the Mark Twain Riverboat, the Sailing Ship Columbia, Pirate's Lair on Tom Sawyer Island, Frontierland Shootin' Exposition, and the nighttime show Fantasmic!. Frontierland is also home to the Golden Horseshoe Saloon, an Old West-style show palace.

=== Fantasyland ===
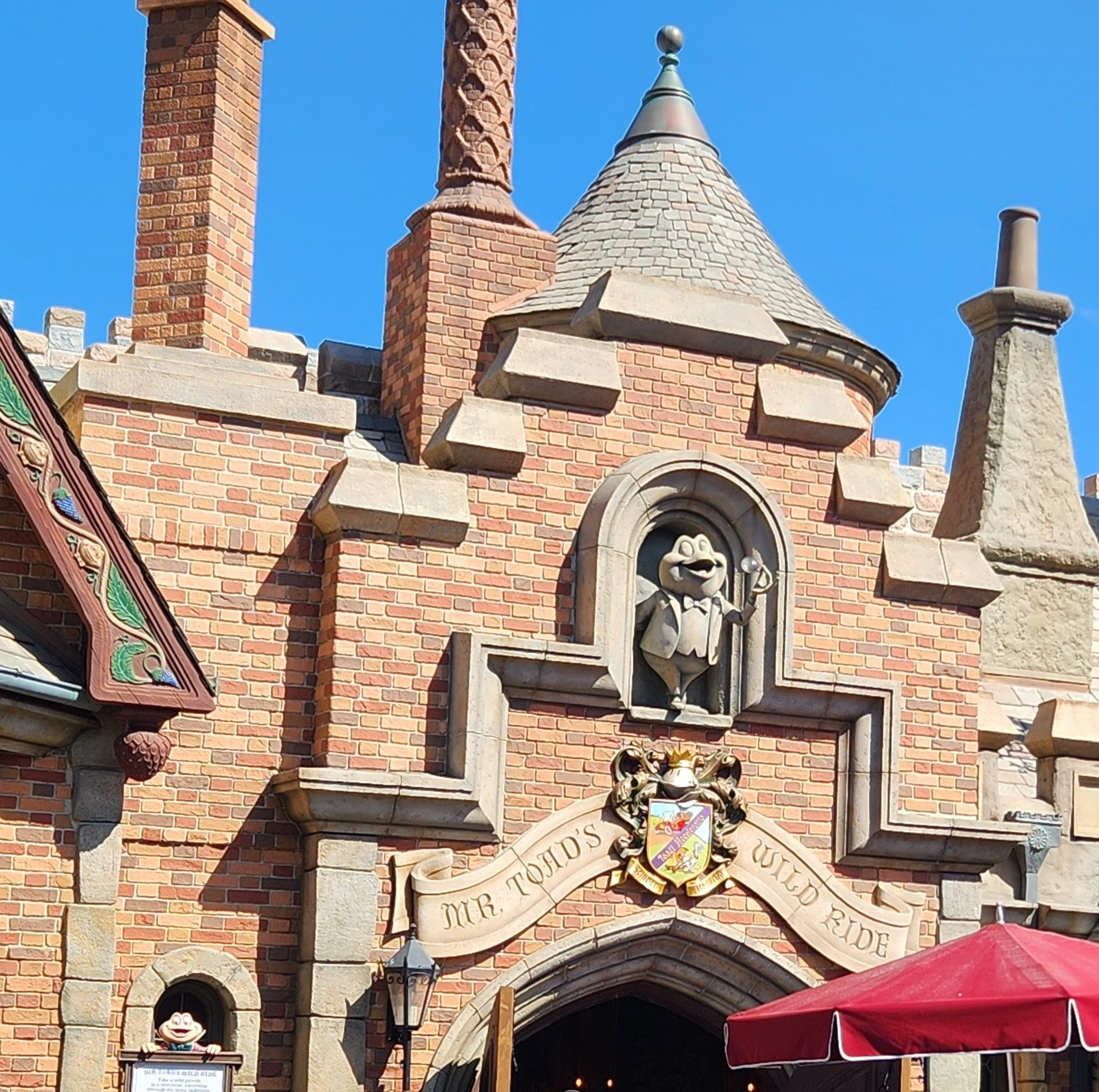
Mr. Toad's Wild Ride

Fantasyland is home to the dark rides Snow White's Enchanted Wish, Peter Pan's Flight, Mr. Toad's Wild Ride, Pinocchio's Daring Journey, and Alice in Wonderland. The area also includes King Arthur Carrousel, Mad Tea Party, Storybook Land Canal Boats, It's a Small World, Matterhorn Bobsleds, and the Fantasyland Theatre. In addition, Sleeping Beauty Castle features a walk-through telling the story of Disney Animation's 1959 film Sleeping Beauty, in the style of the film's production designer Eyvind Earle.

=== Tomorrowland ===
Tomorrowland currently has a "retro-future" theme reminiscent of the illustrations of Jules Verne. Attractions include Space Mountain, Star Wars Launch Bay, Autopia, the Disneyland Monorail Tomorrowland Station, Astro Orbitor, Buzz Lightyear Astro Blasters, Finding Nemo Submarine Voyage and Star Tours–The Adventures Continue.

=== New Orleans Square ===
New Orleans Square is based on 19th-century New Orleans. It is home to Pirates of the Caribbean and the Haunted Mansion, and also houses the private Club 33.

=== Bayou Country ===
Bayou Country originally opened as Bear Country. It was renamed Critter Country in 1988, and in 2024 it was renamed Bayou Country. Its main attraction is the log flume ride Tiana's Bayou Adventure, inspired by Disney Animation's 2009 film The Princess and the Frog. Other attractions include The Many Adventures of Winnie the Pooh and Davy Crockett's Explorer Canoes.

=== Mickey's Toontown ===
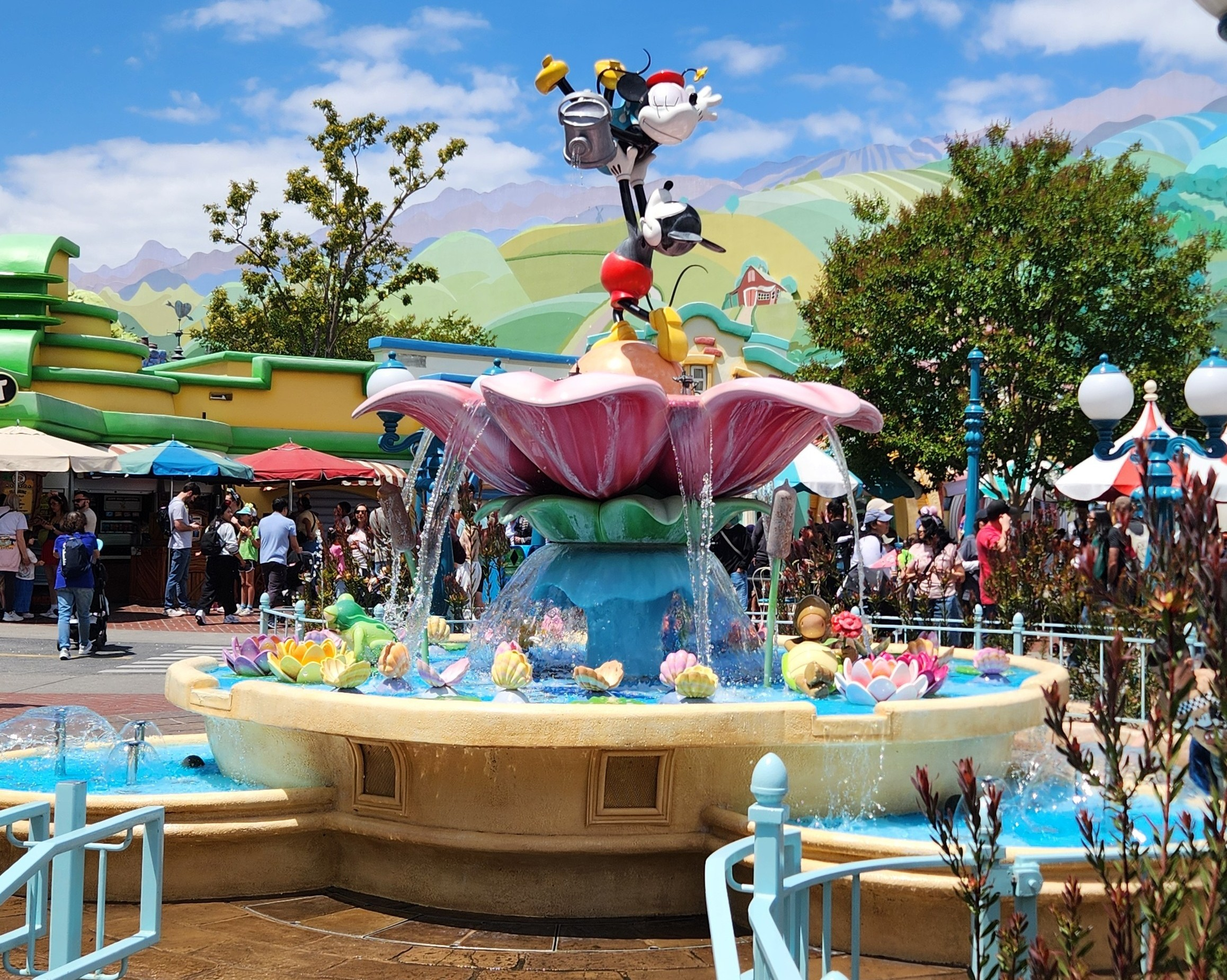

Mickey's Toontown was partly inspired by the fictional Toontown from the 1988 Touchstone Pictures film Who Framed Roger Rabbit. Mickey's Toontown is based on a 1930s cartoon aesthetic. It is home to Disney's classic cartoon characters and features three rides: Chip 'n' Dale's Gadgetcoaster, Mickey & Minnie's Runaway Railway and Roger Rabbit's Car Toon Spin. The land also includes Mickey's House and Meet Mickey, Minnie's House, Goofy's How-To-Play Yard, Donald's Duck Pond, and CenTOONial Park.

=== Star Wars: Galaxy's Edge ===
Star Wars: Galaxy's Edge is set within the Star Wars universe, in the Black Spire Outpost village on the remote frontier planet of Batuu. Attractions include Millennium Falcon: Smugglers Run and Star Wars: Rise of the Resistance.

== Operations ==
=== Backstage ===
Major buildings backstage include the Frank Gehry-designed Team Disney Anaheim, where most of the division's administration currently works, as well as the Old Administration Building, behind Tomorrowland.

Photography is forbidden in these areas, both inside and outside, although some photos have found their way to a variety of web sites. Guests who attempt to explore backstage are warned and often escorted from the property.

=== Transportation ===
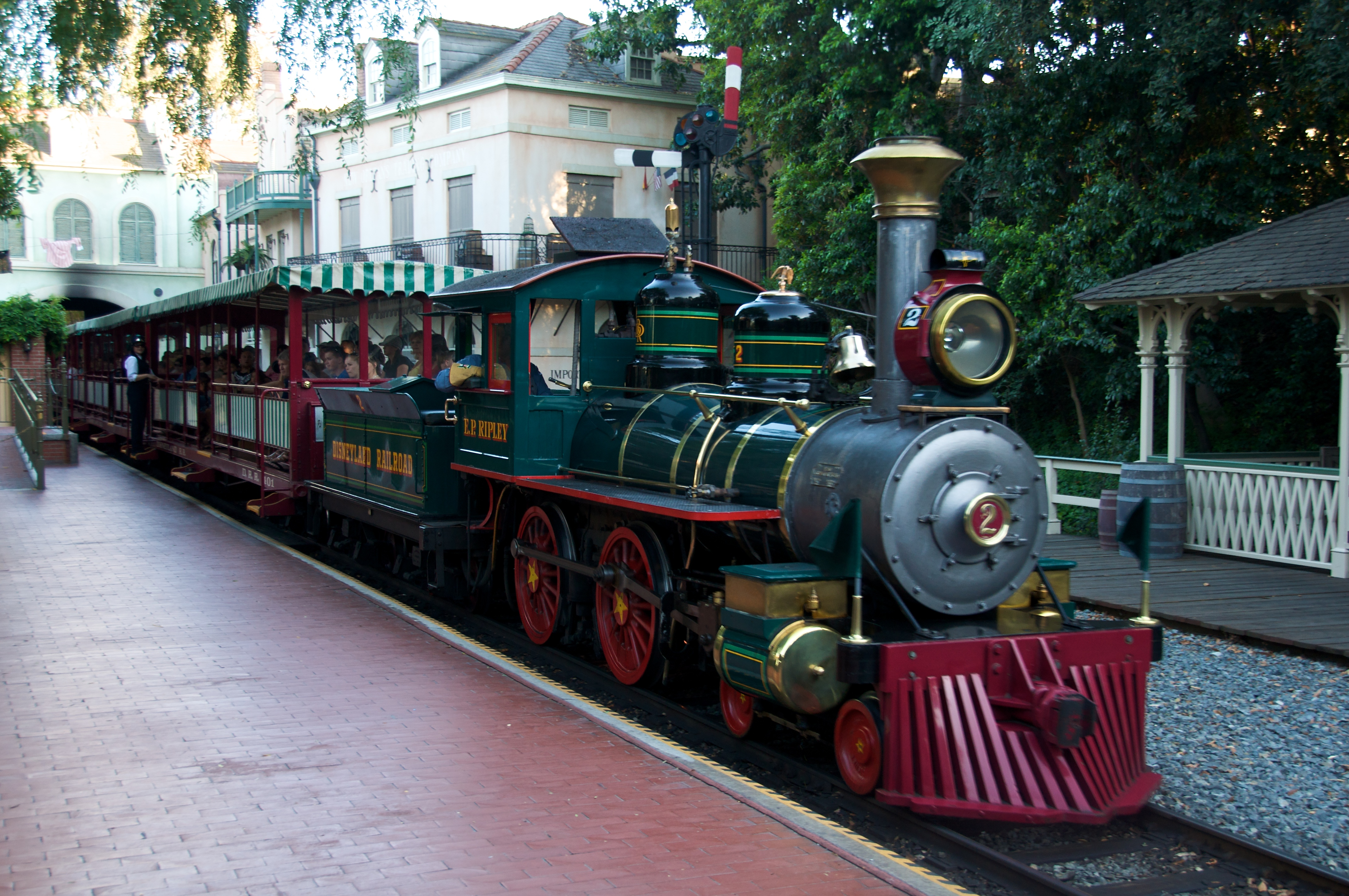
Disneyland Railroad Engine 2 at the New Orleans Square station.

Walt Disney had a longtime interest in transportation, and trains in particular. Disney's passion for the "iron horse" led to him building a miniature live steam backyard railroad—the "Carolwood Pacific Railroad"—on the grounds of his Holmby Hills estate. Throughout all the iterations of Disneyland during the 17 or so years when Disney was conceiving it, one element remained constant: a train encircling the park. The primary designer for the park transportation vehicles was Bob Gurr who gave himself the title of Director of Special Vehicle Design in 1954.

Encircling Disneyland and providing a grand circle tour is the Disneyland Railroad (DRR), a 3 ft (914 mm) narrow gauge short-line railway consisting of five oil-fired and steam-powered locomotives, in addition to three passenger trains and one passenger-carrying freight train. Originally known as the Disneyland and Santa Fe Railroad, the DRR was presented by the Atchison, Topeka and Santa Fe Railway until 1974. From 1955 to 1974, the Santa Fe Rail Pass was accepted in lieu of a Disneyland "D" coupon. With a 3 ft (914 mm) gauge, the most common narrow track gauge used in North America, the track runs in a continuous loop around Disneyland through each of its realms. Each 1900s-era train departs Main Street Station on an excursion that includes scheduled station stops at: New Orleans Square Station; Mickey's Toontown Depot; and Tomorrowland Station. The Grand Circle Tour then concludes with a visit to the "Grand Canyon/Primeval World" dioramas before returning passengers to Main Street, U.S.A.

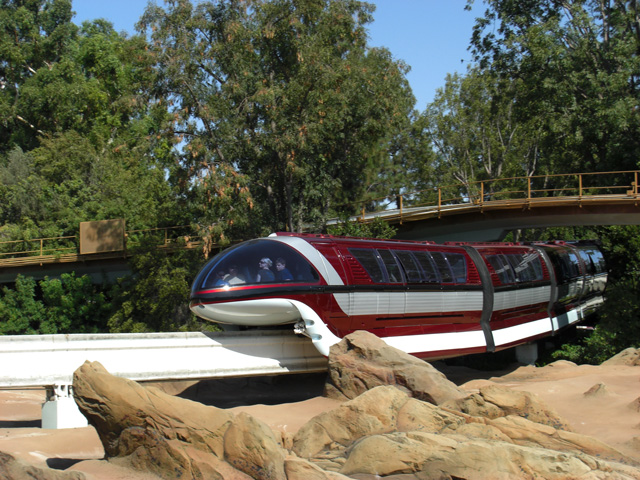
Monorail Red travels over the Finding Nemo Submarine Voyage in Tomorrowland in 2008.

One of Disneyland's signature attractions is its Disneyland Monorail, a monorail service that opened in Tomorrowland in 1959 as the first daily-operating monorail train system in the Western Hemisphere. The monorail guideway has remained almost exactly the same since 1961, aside from small alterations while Indiana Jones Adventure was being built. Five generations of monorail trains have been used in the park since their lightweight construction means they wear out quickly. The most recent operating generation, the Mark VII, was installed in 2008. The monorail shuttles visitors between two stations, one inside the park in Tomorrowland and one in Downtown Disney. It follows a 2.5-mile-long (4.0 km) route designed to show the park from above. Currently, the Mark VII is running with the colors red, blue and orange. The monorail was originally a loop built with just one station in Tomorrowland. Its track was extended and a second station opened at the Disneyland Hotel in 1961. With the creation of Downtown Disney in 2001, the destination is Downtown Disney, instead of the Disneyland Hotel. The physical location of the monorail station did not change, but the original station building was demolished as part of the hotel downsizing, and the replacement station is now separated from the hotel by several Downtown Disney buildings.

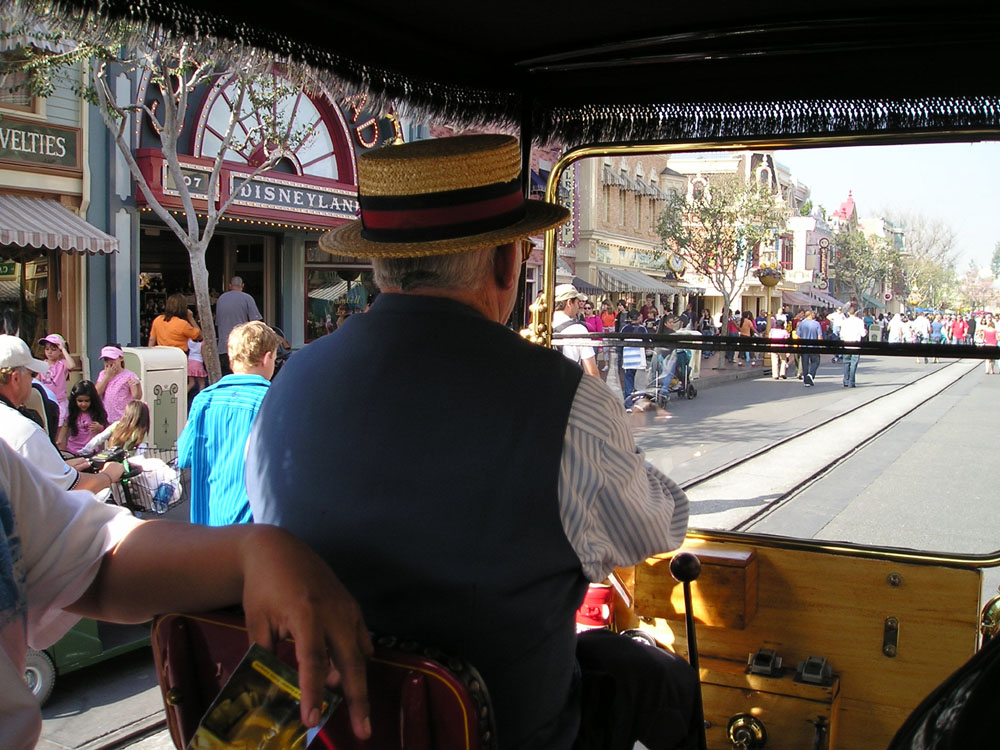
Main Street at Disneyland, as seen from a horseless carriage

All of the vehicles found on Main Street, U.S.A., grouped together as the Main Street Vehicles attraction, were designed to accurately reflect turn-of-the-century vehicles, including a 3 ft (914 mm) gauge tramway featuring horse-drawn streetcars, a double-decker bus, a fire engine, and an automobile. They are available for one-way rides along Main Street, U.S.A. The horse-drawn streetcars are also used by the park entertainment, including The Dapper Dans. The horseless carriages are modeled after cars built in 1903 and are two-cylinder, four-horsepower (3 kW) engines with manual transmission and steering. Walt Disney used to drive the fire engine around the park before it opened, and it has been used to host celebrity guests and in the parades. Most of the original main street vehicles were designed by Gurr.

From the late 1950s to 1968, Los Angeles Airways provided regularly scheduled helicopter passenger service between Disneyland and Los Angeles International Airport (LAX) and other cities in the area. The helicopters initially operated from Anaheim/Disneyland Heliport, located behind Tomorrowland. Service later moved, in 1960, to a new heliport north of the Disneyland Hotel. Arriving guests were transported to the Disneyland Hotel via tram. The service ended after two fatal crashes in 1968: The crash in Paramount, California, on May 22, 1968, killed 23. The second crash in Compton, California, on August 14, 1968, killed 21.

==== Effects on commercial aviation ====
On October 27, 2014, the United States Federal Aviation Administration declared a permanent zone of prohibited airspace around both Disneyland and some of the surrounding areas at Sleeping Beauty Castle. No aircraft, including recreational and commercial drones, are permitted to fly within this zone. This level is shared with Walt Disney World, other pieces of critical infrastructure (military bases, Pantex), and is typically temporarily established during large sporting events.

=== Live entertainment ===
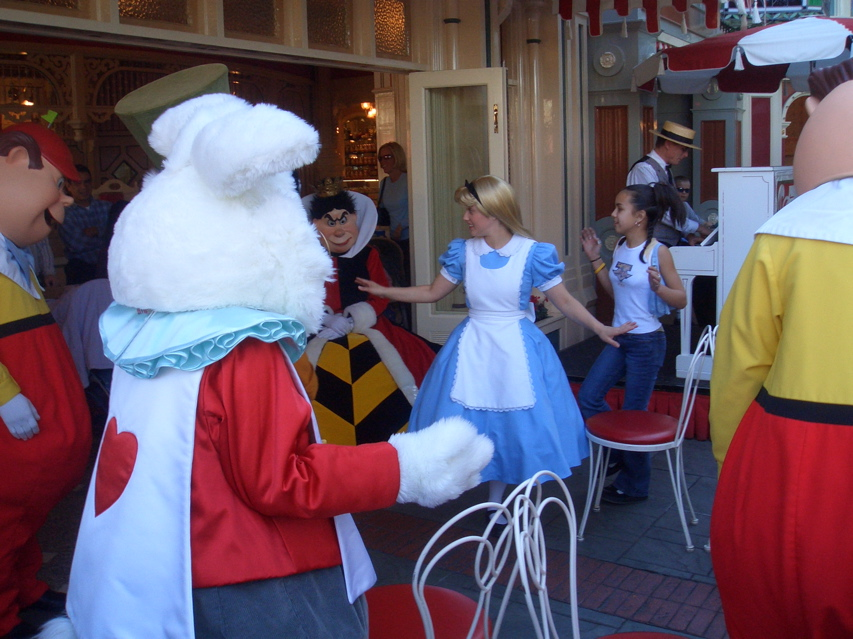
Characters from Disney Animation's Alice in Wonderland host "Disneyland Musical Chairs" at Refreshment Corner, accompanied by a ragtime pianist in 2005.

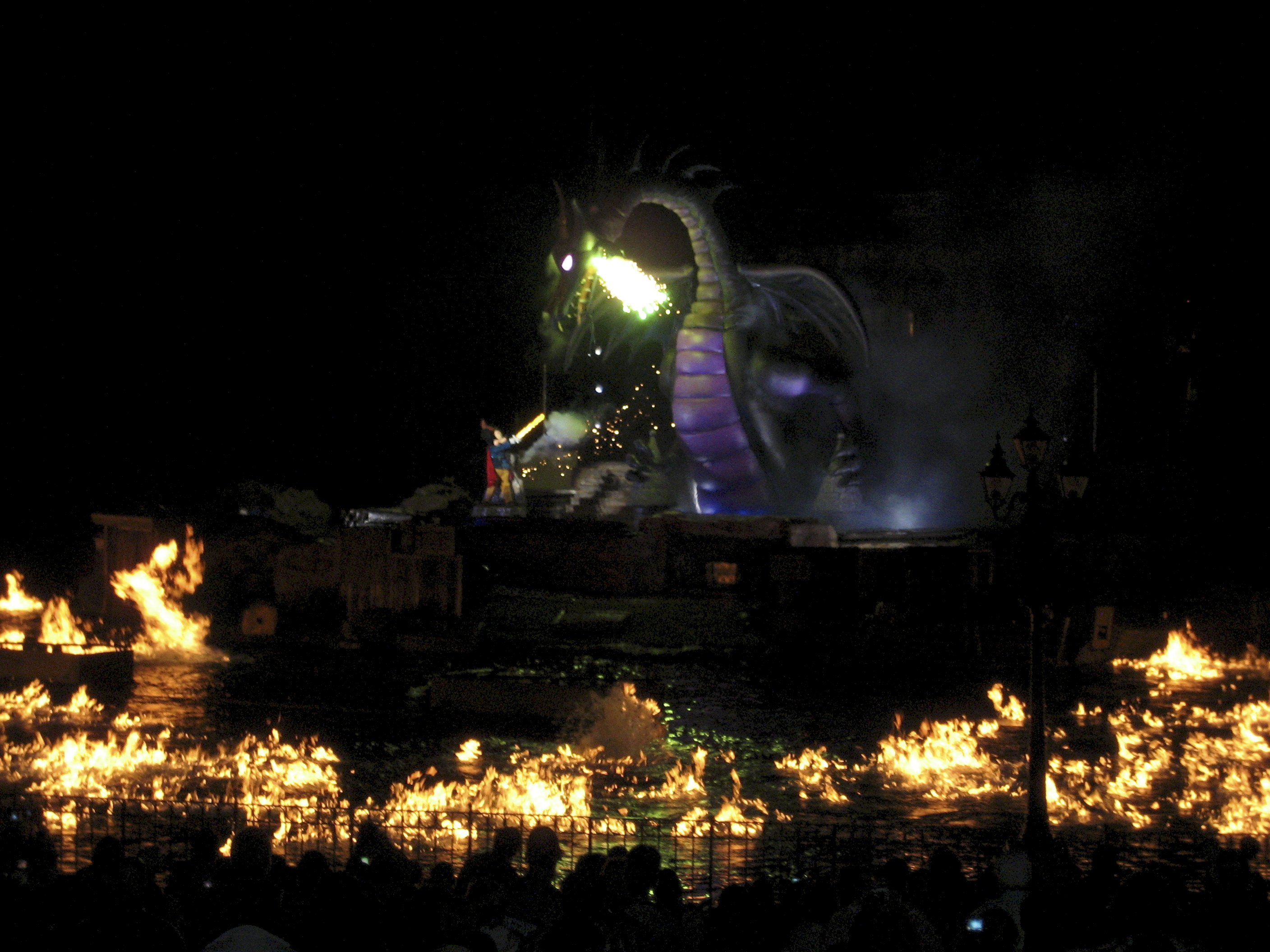
Fantasmic! finale on July 4, 2010

In addition to the attractions, Disneyland provides live entertainment throughout the park. Most of the mentioned entertainment is not offered daily, but on selected days of the week, or selected periods of the year.

Many Disney, Pixar, and Star Wars characters can be found in the park, greeting visitors. In addition, characters from the Australian television series Bluey can be found in "Bluey's Best Day Ever!" at the Fantasyland Theatre.

Every evening at dusk, there is a military-style flag retreat to lower the U.S. Flag by a ceremonial detail of Disneyland's Security staff. The Disneyland Band, which has been part of the park since its opening, plays the role of the Town Band on Main Street, U.S.A. Each year since 1960 during the holiday season, Disney's Candlelight Processional is performed in Town Square.

==== Parades ====
Disneyland has featured a number of different parades traveling down the park's central Main Street – Fantasyland corridor. There have been daytime and nighttime parades that celebrated Disney films or seasonal holidays with characters, music, and large floats. One of the most popular parades was the Main Street Electrical Parade. From May 5, 2005, through November 7, 2008, as part of Disneyland's 50th anniversary, "Walt Disney's Parade of Dreams" was presented. In 2009, "Walt Disney's Parade of Dreams" was replaced by "Celebrate! A Street Party", which premiered on March 27, 2009. During the Christmas season, Disneyland presents "A Christmas Fantasy" Parade. "Mickey's Soundsational Parade", debuted on May 27, 2011. Disneyland debuted a new nighttime parade called "Paint the Night", on May 22, 2015, as part of the park's 60th anniversary. For two weeks in 2020 before the closure due to the COVID-19 pandemic, the parade "Magic Happens" debuted. There was also a virtual parade available for a limited time. At D23 Expo 2022, it was announced that "Magic Happens" would return to Disneyland in spring 2023.

==== Fireworks shows ====
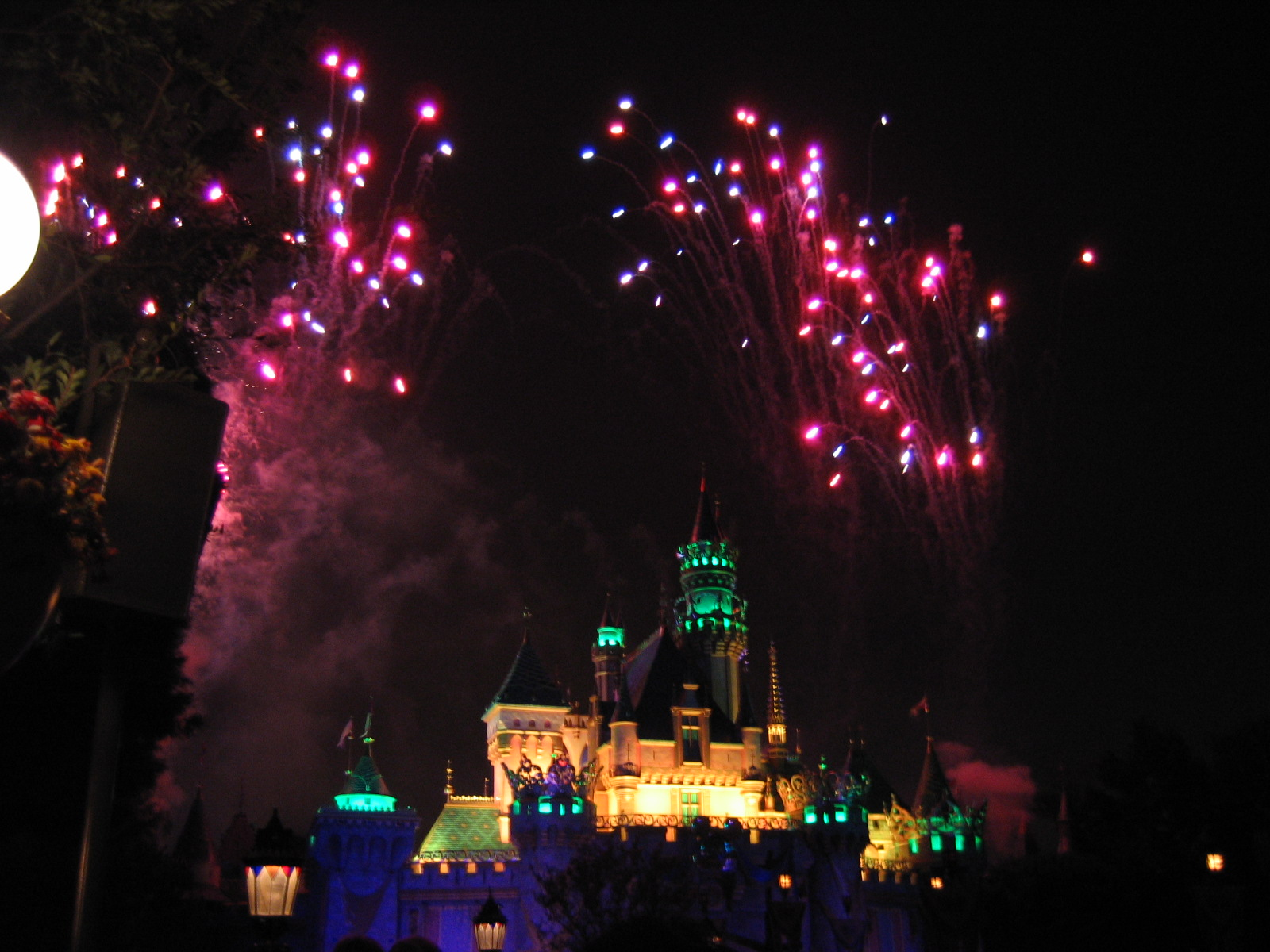
Disneyland fireworks from Sleeping Beauty Castle

Fireworks shows synchronized with Disney songs and often have appearances from Tinker Bell (and other characters) flying in the sky above Sleeping Beauty Castle. Since 2000, presentations have become more elaborate, featuring new pyrotechnics, launch techniques, and story lines. In 2004, Disneyland introduced a new air launch pyrotechnics system, reducing ground-level smoke and noise and decreasing negative environmental impacts. At the time the technology debuted, Disney announced it would donate the patents to a non-profit organization for use throughout the industry. Projection mapping technology debuted on It's a Small World with the creation of The Magic, the Memories and You in 2011, and expanded to Main Street and Sleeping Beauty Castle in 2015 with the premiere of Disneyland Forever.

- Regular fireworks shows:
  - 1958–1999; 2015: Fantasy in the Sky
  - 2000–2004: Believe... There's Magic in the Stars
  - 2004–2005: Imagine... A Fantasy in the Sky
  - 2005–2014; 2017–2019: Remember... Dreams Come True
  - 2009–2014 (summer): Magical: Disney's New Nighttime Spectacular of Magical Celebrations
  - 2019 and 2022 (summer): Disneyland Forever
- Seasonal fireworks shows:
  - August to October: Halloween Screams
  - Independence Day Week: Disney's Celebrate America: A 4th of July Concert in the Sky
  - November to January: Believe... In Holiday Magic
- Limited edition fireworks shows
  - 60th Anniversary: Disneyland Forever
  - Pixar Fest: Together Forever
  - Get Your Ears On – A Mickey and Minnie Celebration: Mickey's Mix Magic
  - Disney100 and 70th Anniversary: Wondrous Journeys

Since 2009, Disneyland has moved to a rotating repertoire of firework spectaculars.

During the slower off-season periods, the fireworks are only offered on weekends. During the busier times, Disney offers additional nights. The park offers fireworks nightly during its busy periods, which include Easter/Spring Break, Summer and Christmas time. A major consideration is the weather; winds at high altitude can result in the delay or cancellation of the show. In response to this, alternate versions of the fireworks spectaculars have been created in recent years, solely using the projections and lighting effects. With a few minor exceptions, such as July 4 and New Year's Eve, shows must finish by 10:00 pm due to the conditions of the permit issued by the City of Anaheim.

In recent years, Disneyland uses smaller and mid-sized fireworks shells and more low-level pyrotechnics on the castle to allow guests to view fireworks spectaculars during a weather issue such as high wind. The first fireworks show to have this format was Believe... In Holiday Magic from the 2018 holiday season.

=== Attendance ===
Annual attendance at Disneyland Park. View source data.

Annual attendance at Disneyland Park (in millions)
| 1950s | Year | | | | | | 1955 | 1956 | 1957 | 1958 | 1959 |
| 1950s | Attendance | | | | | | 1.0 | 4.0 | 4.5 | 4.6 | 5.1 |
| 1960s | Year | 1960 | 1961 | 1962 | 1963 | 1964 | 1965 | 1966 | 1967 | 1968 | 1969 |
| 1960s | Attendance | 5.0 | 5.3 | 5.5 | 5.7 | 6.0 | 6.5 | 6.7 | 7.8 | 9.2 | 9.1 |
| 1970s | Year | 1970 | 1971 | 1972 | 1973 | 1974 | 1975 | 1976 | 1977 | 1978 | 1979 |
| 1970s | Attendance | 10.0 | 9.3 | 9.4 | 9.8 | 9.5 | 9.8 | 9.8 | 10.9 | 11.0 | 11.1 |
| 1980s | Year | 1980 | 1981 | 1982 | 1983 | 1984 | 1985 | 1986 | 1987 | 1988 | 1989 |
| 1980s | Attendance | 11.5 | 11.3 | 10.4 | 9.9 | 9.8 | 12.0 | 12.0 | 13.5 | 13.0 | 14.4 |
| 1990s | Year | 1990 | 1991 | 1992 | 1993 | 1994 | 1995 | 1996 | 1997 | 1998 | 1999 |
| 1990s | Attendance | 12.9 | 11.6 | 11.6 | 11.4 | 10.3 | 14.1 | 15.0 | 14.2 | 13.7 | 13.5 |
| 2000s | Year | 2000 | 2001 | 2002 | 2003 | 2004 | 2005 | 2006 | 2007 | 2008 | 2009 |
| 2000s | Attendance | 13.9 | 12.3 | 12.7 | 12.7 | 13.3 | 14.26 | 14.73 | 14.87 | 14.72 | 15.9 |
| 2010s | Year | 2010 | 2011 | 2012 | 2013 | 2014 | 2015 | 2016 | 2017 | 2018 | 2019 |
| 2010s | Attendance | 15.98 | 16.14 | 15.96 | 16.20 | 16.77 | 18.28 | 17.94 | 18.30 | 18.66 | 18.66 |
| 2020s | Year | 2020 | 2021 | 2022 | 2023 | 2024 | 2025 | | | | |
| 2020s | Attendance | 3.67 | 8.57 | 16.88 | 17.25 | 17.33 | 17.41 | | | | |
| References | | | | | | | | | | | |

=== Tickets ===
From Disneyland's opening day until 1982, the price of the attractions was in addition to the price of park admission. Guests paid a small admission fee to get into the park, but admission to most of the rides and attractions required guests to purchase tickets, either individually or in a book, that consisted of several coupons, initially labeled "A" through "C". "A" coupons allowed admission to the smaller rides and attractions such as the Main Street Vehicles, whereas "C" coupons were used for the most common attractions like Peter Pan's Flight, or the Mad Tea Party. As more thrilling rides were introduced, such as the Disneyland Monorail or the Matterhorn Bobsleds, "D" and then eventually "E" coupons were introduced. Coupons could be combined to equal the equivalent of another ticket (e.g., two "A" tickets equal one "B" ticket). The term E ticket attraction is still used to refer to these most in-demand attractions, though the coupons themselves are no longer used.

Disneyland later featured a "Keys to the Kingdom" booklet of tickets, which consisted of 10 unvalued coupons sold for a single flat rate. These coupons could be used for any attraction regardless of its regular value.

In 1982, Disney dropped the idea for individual ride tickets, replacing them with "passports", charging a single admission price with unlimited access to all attractions, "except shooting galleries". While this idea was not original to Disney, it had business advantages: in addition to guaranteeing that everyone paid the same entry amount regardless of their length of stay or number of rides ridden, the park no longer had to print ride tickets, provide staff for ticket booths, nor provide staff to collect tickets or monitor attractions for people sneaking on without tickets. Later, Disney introduced other entry options such as multi-day passes, Annual Passes (which allow unlimited entry to the Park for an annual fee), and Southern California residents' discounts. In 1999 Disney introduced the FastPass system which was a no extra cost means to reserve an entrance time to an attraction and reduce the time waiting in line. It had extensions that did cost extra and has since been replaced by the Genie+ extra cost reservation system and the Lightning Lanes that cost extra per attraction. In October 2024, Disney began piloting its new "Lightning Lane Premier Pass," which allows guests, for an additional $400 per person per day, to enter a faster line at any time (once per ride) without having to reserve it on the app.

In February 2016, Disneyland adopted a demand-based pricing system for single-day admission, charging different prices for "value", "regular", and "peak" days, based on projected attendance. Approximately 30% of days were designated as "value", mainly weekdays when school was in session, 44% were designated as "regular", and 26% were designated as "peak", mostly during holidays and weekends in July. In February 2020, Disneyland switched to a multi-tiered system, initially with 5 pricing tiers, with approximately 64% of days being in Tier 4 and above. Tier 6 and tier 0 were added in October 2021 and October 2022, respectively.

View source data.

One-day, one-park, adult admission prices over time
| Date | 1981^{*} | June 1982 | October 1983 | May 1984 | January 1985 | May 1985 |
| Price US$ | $10.75 | $12.00 | $13.00 | $14.00 | $15.00 | $16.50 |
| Date | March 1986 | January 1987 | September 1987 | December 1988 | December 1989 | November 1990 |
| Price US$ | $17.95 | $20.00 | $21.50 | $23.50 | $25.50 | $27.50 |
| Date | June 1992 | May 1993 | May 1994 | January 1995 | January 1996 | March 1997 |
| Price US$ | $28.75 | $30.00 | $31.00 | $33.00 | $34.00 | $36.00 |
| Date | January 1998 | January 5, 1999 | January 5, 2000 | November 6, 2000 | March 19, 2002 | January 6, 2003 |
| Price US$ | $38.00 | $39.00 | $41.00 | $43.00 | $45.00 | $47.00 |
| Date | March 28, 2004 | January 10, 2005 | June 20, 2005 | January 4, 2006 | September 20, 2006 | September 21, 2007 |
| Price US$ | $49.75 | $53.00 | $56.00 | $59.00 | $63.00 | $66.00 |
| Date | August 3, 2008 | August 2, 2009 | August 8, 2010 | June 12, 2011 | May 20, 2012 | June 18, 2013 |
| Price US$ | $69.00 | $72.00 | $76.00 | $80.00 | $87.00 | $92.00 |
| Date | May 18, 2014 | February 22, 2015 | February 28, 2016 | February 12, 2017 | February 11, 2018 | January 6, 2019 |
| Price US$ | $96.00 | $99.00 | $95/$105/$119 | $97/$110/$124 | $97/$117/$135 | $104/$129/$149 |
| Date | February 11, 2020 | | October 25, 2021 | | October 11, 2022 | |
| Price US$ | $104/$114/$124/$139/$154 | | $104/$119/$134/$149/$159/$164 | | $104/$114/$129/$144/$159/$169/$179 | |
| Date | October 11, 2023 | | October 9, 2024 | | | |
| Price US$ | $104/$119/$134/$159/$169/$184/$194 | | $104/$126/$142/$164/$180/$196/$206 | | | |

^* Before 1982, passport tickets were available to groups only.

=== Closures ===
Disneyland has had six unscheduled closures:

- In 1963, following the assassination of John F. Kennedy, as an act of mourning.
- In 1970, due to an anti-Vietnam riot instigated by the Youth International Party.
- In 1987, on December 16 due to a winter storm.
- In 1992, on December 7 due to a winter storm.
- In 2001, after the September 11 attacks.
- In 2020–2021; in response to the COVID-19 pandemic and safety protocols, the park closed on March 14, 2020 and reopened on April 30, 2021.

On some occasions, Disneyland has closed its gates to new admissions for part of the operating day because heavy crowds exceeded the park's capacity. This first happened on July 4, 1976, the day of the United States Bicentennial. It occurred again on December 28, 1984.

Additionally, Disneyland has had numerous planned closures:

- In the early years, the park was often scheduled to be closed on Mondays and Tuesdays during the off-season. This was in conjunction with nearby Knott's Berry Farm, which closed on Wednesdays and Thursdays to keep costs down for both parks, while offering Orange County visitors a place to go seven days a week.
- On May 4, 2005, for the 50th Anniversary Celebration media event.
- The park has closed early to accommodate various special events, such as special press events, tour groups, VIP groups, and private parties. It is common for a corporation to rent the entire park for the evening. In such cases, special passes are issued which are valid for admission to all rides and attractions. At the ticket booths and on published schedules, regular guests are notified of the early closures. In the late afternoon, cast members announce that the park is closing, then clear the park of everyone without the special passes. In addition, the park has closed early for inclement weather.

=== Promotions ===
From late August to October 31, the Disneyland Resort holds its "Halloween Time" promotion. Disneyland is decorated for the season and the Haunted Mansion is temporarily re-themed to Haunted Mansion Holiday. In addition, the "Halloween Screams" nighttime show is presented, which includes fireworks on select nights. On October 31, 2007, author Ray Bradbury attended the presentation of a Halloween Tree at Disneyland, a homage to his 1972 book and Halloween tree idea to be included as part of the annual park-wide Halloween decorations.

From early November until early January, the park is decorated for the holidays as part of the "Holidays at the Disneyland Resort" promotion. Seasonal entertainment includes the Believe... In Holiday Magic fireworks show and A Christmas Fantasy Parade, while It's a Small World is temporarily re-themed to It's a Small World Holiday while Haunted Mansion Holiday continues through this time. In addition, Sleeping Beauty Castle is snow-capped and decorated with lights during the holidays.

=== Revenue ===
The theme park grossed $65,151,000 in 1968.

== See also ==
- List of Disney theme park attractions
- List of Disney attractions that were never built
- List of incidents at Disneyland Resort
- Rail transport in Walt Disney Parks and Resorts
- Dapper Day
- Beverly Park
- Kinect: Disneyland Adventures
- Disneyland Handcrafted

Theme parks that were closely themed to Disneyland

- Beijing Shijingshan Amusement Park – Mainland Chinese theme park
- Nara Dreamland – Now-defunct Japanese theme park

Theme parks built by former Disneyland employee C. V. Wood

- Freedomland U.S.A.
- Heritage Square in Golden, Colorado
- Pleasure Island
