= List of fictional frogs and toads =

This is a list of fictional frogs and toads. Frogs and toads have frequently appeared in both children's and adults' literature, as well as other fictional works.

This list is restricted solely to notable frog and toad characters from notable works of fiction. Characters that appear in multiple media have separate listings for each separate appearance, while with instances in which a character has appeared in several separate works in a single medium, only the earliest will be listed.

== Animation ==
This section lists frog and toad characters from animated works, including CGI, stop-motion animation, and traditional animation, as well as television shows and feature-length films.

Name	Series	Notes
Princess Attea	Ben 10	The daughter of Emperor Milleous and the princess of the Incurseans, an alien species resembling humanoid frogs.
Baron Silas Greenback	Danger Mouse	A recurring villain and Danger Mouse's archenemy, voiced by Edward Kelsey. A toad with a wheezy voice, who is sometimes referred to as a frog and also known as the "Terrible Toad". Originally known as Baron Greenteeth in the unbroadcast pilot episode, his name was changed to "Greenback", slang for dollar bill in many regions, adding to the sense of his commercial greed. Allegedly, he turned to a life of crime as a schoolboy when other children stole his bicycle and let all the air out of its tyres.
Bev Bighead	Rocko's Modern Life	Bev "wears the pants" in the family; she demonstrates a loud, domineering manner and keeps Ed in line. Despite this and her ugly exterior and grating voice, she loves her husband and is friendly, as well as a closet party animal.
Bullfrag	Ben 10: Omniverse	The Incursean transformation of Ben Tennyson.
Bullfrog	Captain Laserhawk: A Blood Dragon Remix	An anthropomorphic French frog and member of the Brotherhood of Assassins.
Byonko	Zatch Bell!	A mamodo frog who serves main antagonist Milordo-Z. He possesses a yellowish-green spellbook and uses slime-based spells.
Chauncey "Flat-Face" Frog	Courageous Cat and Minute Mouse	A recurring arch-enemy of the titular protagonists, a chortling, cigar-smoking, derby-hatted criminal mastermind whose voice was based on Edward G. Robinson. He is voiced by series composer Johnny Holliday.
Croaker	Maya the Bee	A green frog who lives in the pond and is one of the main antagonists.
Demetan	Demetan Croaker, The Boy Frog	The titular protagonist.
Dr. Slick and the Street Frogs	The Comic Strip	A group of hip hop frogs led by Dr. Slick who aim to make it big in the rap industry, who star in the Street Frogs segment.
Ed Bighead	Rocko's Modern Life	An employee at a large corporation, who is cruel, petty, bossy, and short-tempered. He particularly dislikes Rocko and his friends, Heffer Wolfe and Filburt, and the only people that he fears are his wife, Bev, and his boss, Mr. Dupette.
Flip	Fiddlesticks	An animated cartoon character created by American cartoonist Ub Iwerks. He starred in a series of cartoons produced by Celebrity Pictures and distributed through Metro-Goldwyn-Mayer from 1930 to 1933 before being revived in the 1960s television series Hoppity Hooper.
Gamatatsu	Naruto	Gamakichi's brother and Gamabunta's son. Though dim-witted and often concerned with finding food, he is kind and always willing to help others.
Gamakichi	Naruto	Gamatatsu's brother and Gamabunta's son. He is sociable, but tends to be witty and rough around the edges.
Gamabunta	Naruto	The chief toad of Mt. Myōboku and Gamakichi and Gamatatsu's father, who serves as the main summon of Master Jiraiya. Though he has the attitude of an old yakuza gangster, once his respect is earned, he becomes a valuable ally in combat.
Prince Fredric	Freddie as F.R.O.7	A prince who, after discovering that his parents were killed by an evil enchantress, is transformed into a frog.
Frog	WordWorld	An intelligent and clever WordFriend who lives in a log. He is the least courageous of the WordFriends and, despite being a frog, is hydrophobic due to the water's slimy texture.
Hoppity Hooper	Hoppity Hooper	A plucky frog who often gets into misadventures with his friends as they seek fortune through various jobs and schemes.
Hypnotoad	Futurama	A large toad with pulsating, multicolored eyes, which emits a loud, ominous buzzing noise and has the ability to hypnotize others at will. As shown in "Bender Should Not Be Allowed on TV", it later acquired its own television show, Everybody Loves Hypnotoad, in which it hypnotizes the audience. The Futurama: Bender's Big Score DVD includes a full 22-minute episode.
Jason Funderberker	Over the Garden Wall	Greg's pet frog, who he gives various names throughout the series before settling on Jason Funderberker in the final episode.
Jean-Bob	The Swan Princess	A French frog who mistakenly believes himself to be a prince. Voiced by John Cleese.
Jelly	Breadwinners	Swaysway and Buhdeuce's pet frog.
Kermit the Frog	Muppet Babies	An animated baby version of Kermit the Frog.
Keroppi Hasunoue	Sanrio	A small frog with a v-shaped mouth and big eyes, who is friends with Hello Kitty and lives in Donut Pond.
King Harold	Shrek franchise	A frog and the king of Far Far Away, who was transformed into a human by the Fairy Godmother's magic. He is a human for the majority of Shrek 2 until the Fairy Godmother is killed, returning him to his original frog form. Harold dies at the beginning of Shrek the Third after informing Shrek of a possible heir to the throne, Arthur Pendragon.
Michigan J. Frog	Looney Tunes	A male frog who wears a top hat and carries a cane. He sings pop music, ragtime, Tin Pan Alley hits, and other songs from the late 19th and early 20th century while dancing and performing acrobatics in the style of early 20th century vaudeville.
Emperor Milleous	Ben 10	The emperor of the Incurseans and father of Princess Attea.
Mr. Witherspoon	BoJack Horseman	A bullfrog who is Princess Carolyn's boss.
Principal Pixiefrog	My Gym Partner's a Monkey	A pixie frog and the administrator of Charles Darwin Middle School.
Slippy Toad	Star Fox	Inventor and mechanic on the Star Fox team.
Sprig Plantar	Amphibia	A 10-year-old pink anthropomorphic frog who serves as a guide, friend and surrogate brother for protagonist Anne Boonchuy after she is transported to Amphibia.
Tiana and Prince Naveen	The Princess and the Frog	Two characters who are transformed into frogs by Dr. Facilier's magic.
The Toad	Flushed Away	A large, pompous amphibian who seeks for the rat population to be killed off so he can make room for his offspring. Voiced by Ian McKellen.
Toro and Pancho	Tijuana Toads	Two toads who unsuccessfully try to catch their prey.
Toadborg	Bucky O'Hare and the Toad Wars!	A large, purple cyborg toad who is second-in-command under the series' main antagonist, KOMPLEX. Toadborg is an original character created for the animated series and did not appear in the original Continuity Comics series.
Tubb	Rubbadubbers	A male anthropomorphic pink toy frog with a Scottish accent who is the leader of the Rubbadubbers.
Typhoon Toad	The Comic Strip	An anthropomorphic toad and the town's DJ, who is a friend of the Street Frogs.

== Literature ==
Name	Book	Author
Brer Bull-Frog	The Complete Tales of Uncle Remus	Joel Chandler Harris
Bufo the toad	The Kine Saga	Alan Lloyd
Bunda the Marsh Frog	The Kine Saga	Alan Lloyd
Dan'l Webster	The Celebrated Jumping Frog of Calaveras County	Mark Twain
Frog and Toad	Frog and Toad	Arnold Lobel
Genesis Frog	Homestuck	Andrew Hussie
Glubbslyme	Glubbslyme	Jacqueline Wilson
Grandfather Frog	Thornton Burgess Bedtime Stories	Thornton Burgess
Jeremy Fisher	The Tale of Mr. Jeremy Fisher	Beatrix Potter
Mr. Toad	The Wind in the Willows	Kenneth Grahame
Old Mr. Toad	Thornton Burgess Bedtime Stories	Thornton Burgess
Oykamon	Mariel of Redwall	Brian Jacques
Toad	The Animals of Farthing Wood	Colin Dann
Trevor	Harry Potter and the Philosopher's Stone	J. K. Rowling
Warton and Morton	Warton and Morton	Russell E. Erickson
Froggy	The Land of Stories	Chris Colfer

== Comics ==
Name	Comic/Manga	Creator	Notes
Keronians	Sgt. Frog	Mine Yoshizaki	A group of frog-like aliens who seek to conquer Earth.
Punk Frogs	Teenage Mutant Ninja Turtles	Kevin Eastmen / Peter Laird	A group of anthropomorphic mutant frogs who are enemies of the turtles.
Throg	Thor	Walt Simonson	A human named Simon Walterson who was transformed into an anthropomorphic frog by an unnamed mystic and wields a miniature version of Thor's hammer Mjolnir.
Jimmy	Heathcliff	Peter Gallagher	A recurring character and friend to Heathcliff. Heathcliff often promotes Jimmy as a celebrity, but Jimmy gets little to no attention from the public.

== Television ==
Name	Series
Big Old Bullfrog	Bear in the Big Blue House
Isambard Toad	A Tale of Two Toads
Kermit the Frog	Sesame Street and The Muppet Show
Robin	The Muppet Show

== Music ==
Name	Musical piece	Artist	Notes
Crazy Frog		Jamba!	A frog who originated from ringtone TV spots and later became popular after being featured in a series of CGI-animated music videos.
Daniel Webster	The Jumping Frog of Calaveras County	Lukas Foss	An opera adaptation of Mark Twain's short story "The Celebrated Jumping Frog of Calaveras County."
Jeremiah	Joy to the World	Three Dog Night	A bullfrog referenced in the song's lyrics: "Jeremiah was a bullfrog. Was a good friend of mine. Never understood a single word he said but I helped him drink his wine."

== Video games ==
Name	Species	Origin	Notes
Battletoads	Toad	Battletoads series	
Frog	Frog (transformed human)	Chrono Trigger	Originally Glenn, a knight from the Middle Ages, he swore revenge against Magus, who killed his friend Cyrus and transformed Glenn into an anthropomorphic frog.
Frogger	Frog	Frogger series	
Jazz Amun	Frog (transformed human)	Jitsu Squad	An anthropomorphic male frog with afro hair. Voiced by Eli Harris.
KeroKeroKeroppi	Toad	Kero Kero Keroppi no Daibouken series	
Prince of Sablé and Prince Richard	Frog (transformed human)	Kaeru no Tame ni Kane wa Naru	The respective princes of the Sablé Kingdom and the Custard Kingdom, who are transformed into frogs by Mandola's magic potion.
Slippy Toad	Toad	Star Fox series	
Superfrog	Frog (transformed human)	Superfrog	Originally a prince. Homage to the Frog Prince fairy tale.

== Mythology ==
Name	Myth	Notes
Heqet	Egyptian mythology	A goddess of fertility who is often represented as a frog.
Kek	Egyptian mythology	The personification of darkness, who is often represented as a frog.
Jiraiya	Japanese folklore	A Japanese folk hero who uses a giant toad as a mount.
Llamhigyn y Dŵr	Welsh folklore	A legendary creature resembling a frog with no legs and bat-like wings.
Loveland frog	American folklore	A legendary creature resembling an anthropomorphic frog who was sighted in Loveland, Ohio. It is now thought to have been a large iguana with no tail.
Tiddalik	Australian indigenous mythology	A frog who drank all the water in the world and hoarded it until Nabunum the eel made him spit the water out.

== Other ==
Name	Notes
Coleman Frog	Fredericton giant famous frog
Crapaud	Heraldic beast
Dat Boi	An anthropomorphic frog riding a unicycle who became an Internet meme in 2015.
Pepe the Frog	An anthropomorphic frog who is the subject of numerous Internet memes.

== See also ==
- Frogs in culture
- Cultural depictions of amphibians
