= List of works by Aurelio Macedonio Espinosa Sr. =

Aurelio Macedonio Espinosa Sr., PhD (1880–1958), a professor at Stanford University, was an internationally known scholar because of his studies in Spanish and Spanish American folklore and philology. He was especially known for his promotion of the study of the Spanish language and literature.

== Works ==
1907

- "Los Comanches, A New-Mexican Spanish Heroic Play," University of New Mexico Bulletin, Language Series, 1 (1907).

1909–1914

- "Studies in New-Mexican Spanish, Part I: Phonology," Revue de Dialectologie Romane, I (1909), 157–239, 269–300. Also published by the University of Chicago Press, 1909; and University of New Mexico Bulletin, Languages Series, I (1909). See listings under 1930 for later edition.
- "Studies in New-Mexican Spanish, Part II: Morphology," Revue de Dialectologie Romane, III (1911), 251–286; IV (1912), 241–256; V (1913), 142–172. See listings under 1946 for later edition.
- "Studies in New-Mexican Spanish, Part III: The English Elements," Revue de Dialectologie Romane, VI (1914), 241–317.

1910

- Review of Rodolfo Lenz, Los elementos indios del castellano de Chile (Santiago: 1904–10), in Revue de Dialectologie Romane, II (1910), 420–424.

1910–1916

- "New Mexican Spanish Folklore: Part I, Myths, Part II, Superstitions and Beliefs," Journal of American Folk-Lore, XXIII (1910), 395–418.
- "New Mexican Spanish Folklore: Part III, Folktales," ibid., XXIV (1911), 397–444.
- "New Mexican Spanish Folklore: Part IV, Proverbs, Part V, Popular Comparisons," ibid., XXVI (1913), 97–122.
- "New Mexican Spanish Folklore: Part VI, Los Trovos del Viejo Vilmas, Part VII, More Folk-Tales, Part VIII, Short Folk-Tales and Anecdotes," ibid., XXVII (1914), 105–147.
- "New Mexican Spanish Folklore: Part VI, Addenda," ibid., XXVIII (1915), 204–206.
- "New Mexican Spanish Folklore: Part IX, Riddles," ibid., (1915), 319–352.
- "New Mexican Spanish Folklore: Part X, Children's Games, Part XI, Nursery Rhymes," ibid., XXIX (1916), 505–535.

1911

- The Spanish Language in New Mexico and Southern Colorado, Historical Society of New Mexico, Publication No. 16 (Santa Fe: May 1911).
- "New Mexican Spanish Folklore," American Philological Association, Transactions and Proceedings, XL (1911), lxiii-lxv.
- "La poesia popular de Nuevo Méjico," Revista Positiva, Mexico, Epoca II, Número 134 (1911), 350–352.
- "Los Hermanos Penitentes (The Penitent Brothers)," The Catholic Encyclopedia (New York: The Encyclopedia Press Inc., 1911), XI, 635–636.

1912

- "Cuentitos populares nuevo-mejicanos y su transcripción fonética," Bulletin de Dialectologie Romane, IV (1912), 97–115.

1913

- "Nombres de bautismo nuevomejicanos: algunas observaciones sobre su desarrollo fonético," Revue de Diakctologie Romane, V (1913), 356–373.
- Review of Julio Viculia Cifuentes, Romances Populares y Vulgares Recogidos de la Tradición Oral Chilena,
- Santiago, 1912, in Bulletin de Dialectologie Romane, V (1913), 49–55.

1914

- Editor of J. Alden Mason, "Folktales of the Tepecanos," Journal ofAmerican Folk-Lore, XXVII (1914), 148–210.
- "Comparative Notes on New Mexican and Mexican Spanish Folktales," Journal ofAmerican Folk-Lore, XXVII (1914), 211–231.

1915

- "Romancero nuevomejicano," Revue Hispanique, Paris, XXXIII (1915), 446–560.
- Paul Radin and Aurelio M. Espinosa, "Folk-Tales from Oaxaca," Journal of American Folk-Lore, XXVIII (1915), 390–308.

1916

- J. Alden Mason and Aurelio M. Espinosa, "Porto Rican Folklore, Riddles," Journal of American Folk-Lore, XXIX (1916), 432–504.
- "Notes on Barbara Freire Marreco, 'New Mexican Spanish Folk-lore'," Journal ofAmerican Folk-Lore, XXIX (1916), 536–546.
- "Traditional Ballads from Andalucia," Flügel Memorial Volume (Stanford University: Stanford University Press, 1916), 92–107.

1917

- "Speech Mixture in New Mexico," The Pacific Ocean in History, ed. by H. Morse Stephens and Herbert E. Bolton (New York: Macmillan, 1917), 408–428.
- "Romancero nuevomejicano, Addenda," Revue Hispanique, XL (1917), 215–227.
- "Nota adicional al Romancero nuevomejicano," Revue Hispanique, XLI (1917), 678–680.
- Paul Radin and Aurelio M. Espinosa, El Folk-Lore de Oaxaca (Habana: 1917).

1918

- J. Alden Mason and Aurelio M. Espinosa, "Porto-Rican Folklore: Décimas, Christmas Carols, Nursery Rhymes and Other Songs," Journal of American Folk-Lore, XXXI (1918), 289–450.
- "All Souls' Day at Zufii, Acoma and Laguna," Journal of American Folk-Lore, XXXI (1918), 550–552.
- "Romances de Puerto Rico," Revue Hispanique, XLII (1918), 309–364.
- "California Spanish Folklore: Circular Letter," Stanford University, May 1918.

1921

- "A Folklore Expedition to Spain," Journal of American Folk-Lore, XXXIV (1921), 127–142.
- "Sobre la Leyenda de los Infantes de Lara," Romanic Review, XII (1921), 135–145.

1921–1926

- "Viajes por España," published in ten parts in Hispania, 1921–1926, IV (1921), 15–17, 56–60, 165–167, 223–226; V (1922), 25–28, 83–86, 149–156, 365–368; VII (1924), 187–190; IX (1926), 345–349.

1922

- "Palabras españolas e inglesas," Hispania, V (1922), 219–228.

1922–1927

- J. Alden Mason and Aurelio M. Espinosa, "Porto-Rican Folklore: Folktales, Part I," Journal of American Folk-Lore, XXXV (1922), 1-61; Part I, continued, XXXVII (1924), 247–344; Part II, XXXVIII (1925), 507–618; Part III, XXXIX (1926), 225–304; Part IV, XXXIX (1926), 304–369; Part IV, Continued, XL (1927), 313–414.

1923

- "Los cuentos populares de España," Boletin de la Biblioteca Menéndez y Pelayo, Santander, V (1923), 39–61.
- "Folklore from Spain," Modern Philology, XX (1923), 425–434.
- "Fiesta de Gallo in Barbadillo," Modern Philology, XX (1923), 425–434. 1923–1926
- Cuentos Populares Españoles (Stanford University: Stanford University Press, 1923–1926), 3 vols.

1925

- "Spanish Folk-Lore in the United States," Modern Language Bulletin, X (1925), 24–25.
- "Los romances tradicionales en California," Homenaje a Menéndez Pidal (Madrid: 1925), I, 299–313.
- "Syllabic Consonants in New Mexican Spanish," Language, I (1925), 109–118.
- Cuentos, Romances, y Cantares (Boston: Allyn and Bacon, 1925).

1926

- "Spanish Folk-Lore in New Mexico," The New Mexico Historical Review, I (1926), 135–155.
- Review of Fritz Kruiger, Die Gegenstandskultur Sanabrias und seiner Nachbargebiete (Hamburg: 1925), in Hispania, IX (1926), 68.

1927

- Review of James H. English, The Alternation of H and F in Spanish, (New York: Instituto de las Españas, 1926), in Hispania, X (1927), 208.
- Review of R. Grossmann, Das ausliindliche Sprachgut im Spanischen des Rio de la Plata (Hamburg: 1926), in Language, III (1927), 20–25.

1927–1928

- "The Language of the Cuentos Populares Españoles," Language, III (1927), 188–198; IV (1928), 18–27, 111–119.

1928

- "La Ciencia del Folklore," Archivos del Folklore Cubano, Havana, III (1928), reprint, Cultural S.A., Havana, 1929, 1–16.

1929

- "El Romancero," Hispania, XII (1929), 1-32.
- "El folklore español en America," La Prensa, New York, February 1929.
- "La transmisión de los Cuentos Populares," Archives del Folklore Cubano, Havana, IV (1929), 39–52, reprint, Cultural S.A., Havana, 1929, 1–16.
- "European Versions of the Tar-Baby Stories," Folklore, London, XL (1929), 217–227.
- "Una versión española del romance Las glorias de Teresa," Archivos del Folklore Cubano, Havana, IV (1929), 153–156.

1930

- "Folklore de California," Miscelánea Filológica Dedicada a D. Antonio M. Alcover (Palma, Mallorca: Circulo de Estudios, Palma, Mallorca, 1930), 111–131.
- "Apuntaciones para un diccionario de nuevomejicanismos; algunas formas verbales raras, curiosas," Estudios Eruditos in Memoriam de Adolfo Bonilla y San Martin (Madrid: 1930), II, 615–625.
- "Notes on the Origin and History of the Tar-Baby Story," Journal ofAmerican Folk-Lore, XLIII (1930),129-209.
- "A Third European Version of the Tar-Baby Story," Journal of American Folk-Lore, XLIII (1930), 329–331.
- "El folklore en España," Revista Bimestre Cubana, Havana, XXV (1930), 449–462.
- "Use of the Conditional for the Subjunctive in Castilian Popular Speech," Modern Philology, XXVII (1930), 445–449.
- Estudios Sobre el Español de Nuevo Méjico, I, Fonética (Buenos Aires: Biblioteca de Dialectologia Hispanoamericana, Instituto de Filologia, Universidad de Buenos Aires, edited by Amado Alonso and Angel Rosenblat, 1930), pp. 472.
- "Origen oriental y desarrollo hist6rico del cuento de las doce palabras retorneadas," Revista de Filologia Española, Madrid, XVII (1930), 390–413.
- "El tema de Roncesvalles y de Bernardo del Carpio en la poesia de Cuba," Archivos del Folklore Cubano, Havana, V (1930), 193–198.

1931

- "Sobre los orígenes del cuento del muñeco de brea," Boletin de la Biblioteca Menéndez y Pelayo, Numero extraordinario en homenaje a don Miguel Artigas (1931), I, 296–318.
- El Romancero Español (Madrid: Biblioteca Española de Divulgación Científica, IX, 1931). Originally published in Hispania in 1929, see above.
- "New Mexican Versions of the Tar-Baby Story," New Mexico Quarterly, I (1931), 85–104.

1932

- "Traditional Spanish Ballads in New Mexico," Hispania, XV (1932), 89–102.
- "Romances españoles tradicionales que cantan y relatan los indios de los pueblos de Nuevo Méjico," Boletin de la Biblioteca Menéndez y Pelayo, XIV (1932), 98–109.
- "El Desarrollo de la Palabra 'Castilla' en la Lengua de los Indios Queres de Nuevo Mejico," Revista de Filologia Española, XIX (1932), 261–277.
- Review of E. F. Tiscornia, La lengua de "Martin Fierro" (Buenos Aires: 1930), in Language, VIII (1932), 57–59.

1933

- "Another New Mexico Version of the Tar-Baby Story," New Mexico Quarterly, III (1933), 31–36.
- "European Versions of the Tar-Baby Story," Journal of American Folk-Lore, XLVI (1933), 91–92.
- "La leyenda de Don Juan y las Doce palabras retorneadas," Boletin de la Biblioteca Menéndez y Pelayo, XIII (1933), 216–219.

1934

- "Spanish Tradition in New Mexico," University of New Mexico Bulletin, XLVII (1934), 26–39.
- "El desarrollo fonético de la palabra 'todo' en la frase 'con todo y + substantivo' en el español de Nuevo Méjico," Investigaciones Lingüísticas, Mexico, II (1934), 195–199.
- "La Clasificación de los Cuentos Populares, Un Capitulo de Metodologia Folklórica," Boletin de la Academia Española, XXI (1934), 175–208.
- "Las fuentes orientales del cuento de la Matrona de Efeso," Boletin de la Biblioteca Menéndez y Pelayo, XVI (1934), 489–502.

1935

- "New Mexican Spanish Coplas Populares," Hispania, XVIII (1935), 135–150.
- "La palabra Castilla en la lengua de los indios hopis de Arizona," Revista de Filologia Española, XXII (1935), 298–300.
- "Folklore in European Literature, A Syllabus for Course E180 in the Department of Romanic Languages, Stanford University" (Stanford University: 1935; revised edition, 1947).

1936

- "Pueblo Indian Folk Tales," Journal of American Folk-Lore, XLIX (1936), 69–133.
- "Hispanic Versions of the Tale of the Corpse Many Times 'Killed'," Journal of American Folk-Lore, XLIX (1936), 181–193.
- "El tema de la Princesa Orgullosa en la tradición hispánica." Homenage a Antoni Rubió i Lluch (Barcelona: 1936), III, 621–629.

1937

- España en Nuevo Mejico--Lecturas Elementales Sobre la Historia de Nuevo Méjico y su Tradición Española (New York: Allyn and Bacon, 1937).

1938

- "Otro romance español tradicional," Revista Bimestral de la Universidad de los Andes, Merida, Venezuela, II (1938), 121–127.
- "More Notes on the Origin and History of the Tar-Baby Store," Folk-Lore, XLIX (1938), 168–181.
- Conchita Argüello, Historia y Novela Californiana (New York: The Macmillan Company, 1938).
- Review of Alice Corbin Henderson, Brothers of Light: The Penitentes of the Southwest, (New York: Harcourt, Brace and Co., 1937), in Journal of American Folk-Lore, LI (1938), 445–449.

1940

- "Spanish Folktales from California," Hispania, XXIII (1940), 121–144.

1941

- "An Extraordinary Example of Spanish Ballad Tradition in New Mexico," Stanford Studies in Language and Literature (Stanford: Stanford University Press, 1941), 28–34.
- "Sobre la Importancia del Romancero," Revista Cubana, XV (1941), 214–219.

1942

- "Miscellaneous Materials from the Pueblo Indians of New Mexico," Philological Quarterly, XXI (1942), 121–127.

1943

- "A New Classification of the Fundamental Elements of the Tar-Baby Story on the Basis of Two Hundred and Sixty-Seven Versions," Journal of American Folk-Lore, LVI (1943), 31–37.
- With J. Manuel Espinosa: "The Texans-A New Mexican Spanish Folk Play of the Middle Nineteenth Century," The New Mexico Quarterly Review (Autumn, 1943), 299–308.

1944

- "Peninsular Spanish Versions of the Tar-Baby Story," Journal of American Folk-Lore, LVII (1944), 210–211.
- With J. Manuel Epinosa, "Los Tejanos," Hispania, XXVII (1944), 291–314.
- "California Spanish Folklore: Riddles," California Folklore Quarterly, III (1944), 293–298.
- Review of Anuario de la Sociedad Folklórica de México, Vols. I-III (1938–42), in California Folklore Quarterly, III (1944), 337–338.

1945

- "Los 'Agüelos' de Nuevo Méjico," Boletin de la Biblioteca Menendez y Pelayo XXI (1945), 71–78.

1946

- Estudios Sobre el Español de Nuevo Méjico, II, Morfologia (Buenos Aires: Biblioteca de Dialectologia Hispanoamericana, Instituto de Filologia, Universidad de Buenos Aires, edited by Angel Rosenblat, 1946).
- Cuentos Populares de España (Buenos Aires-Mexico: Espasa-Calpe Argentina, S.A., 1946).

1946–1947

- Cuentos Populares Españoles, Recogidos de la Tradición Oral de España (Madrid: Consejo Superior de Investigaciones Cientificas, 1946–1947), 3 vols.

1949–1950

- "Spanish Folklore," Standard Dictionary of Folklore, Mythology, and Legend (New York: Funk and Wagnalls, 1949, 1950), 1061–1073.

1951

- "Spanish and Spanish-American Folk Tales," Journal of American Folk-Lore, LXIV (1951), 151–162.
- "Las versiones hispánicas peninsulares del cuento del Muñeco de Brea," Estudios dedicados a Menéndez Pidal (Madrid: Consejo Superior de Investigaciones Cientificas, 1951), II, 357–381.

1952

- "Spanish Tradition Among the Pueblo Indians," Estudios Hispánicos: Homenaje a Archer M. Huntington, Wellesley, Massachusetts, 1952, 131–141.

1953

- Romancero de Nuevo Méjico (Madrid: Revista de Filologia Española---Anejo LVIII, 1953.

1954

- "Folklore infantil de Nuevo Méjico," Revista de dialectologia y tradiciones populares, X (1954), 1-49.
