= Martha J. Harvey =

Martha J. Harvey was a founder of the York Sunbury Historical Society which was established in 1932. She was a president of Fredericton's Women's Institute, an involved member of the Social Service Council, and was deeply committed to the welfare of the greater Fredericton community.

The Martha J. Harvey Award of Distinction is presented to individuals, or groups, who have shown a dedicated commitment to the goals of the York Sunbury Historical Society. Past awards have honoured those who have made significant contributions in writing the history of central New Brunswick, in preserving its artefacts and heritage buildings, or in offering exemplary service to the Society in its efforts to discover and preserve the history and heritage of York and Sunbury counties.

Martha Harvey was the wife of John Harvey, founder of Harvey's Photography Studio in Fredericton, New Brunswick in 1883. John died in 1901 at which time Martha took over the business and eventually sold it to Frank Pridham in 1917.

Martha J. Harvey Award of Distinction Recipients:

1981 - Lt. Gen Ernest William Sansom, 1984 - Muriel McQueen Fergusson, 1984 - Lucy McNeil, 1985 - Dr. Alfred Bailey, 1985 - Dr. D.J. McLeod, 1986 - Louise Hill, 1987 - Fred H. Phillips, 1988 - Dr. Elizabeth McGahan, 1988 - Dr. Stuart Smith, 1989 - Dr. James Chapman, 1990 - Alden J. Clark, 1991 - Dr. Ivan H. Crowell, 1992 - Velma Kelly, 1993 - Ted Jones, 1993 - Dr. Murray Young, 1994 - Donna Wallace, 1995 - Richard Bird, 1996 - Fred White, 1998 - Ruth Scott, 2000 - Government of New Brunswick Heritage Branch, 2004 – Frederick Wilmot Hubbard, 2005 - Mr. & Mrs. T.W. Acheson, 2009 - Paul O'Connell, 2010 - The Gregg Centre for the Study of War and Society, 2010 - Honorable David Dickson, 2011 - Bob Dallison, 2011 - George Bidlake, 2012 - Brian Hallett, 2012 - Eleanor Stillwell, 2013 - Vincent Erickson, 2013 - Donald Roberts, 2014 - Melynda Jarratt, 2014 - Elizabeth Earl, 2015 - Dr C. Mary Young, 2016 - Dr. Sheila Andrew, 2017 - Bob McNeil, 2018 - Dr Gail Campbell, 2019 - David Myles, 2020 - No award given, 2021 - No award given, 2022 - Dr Gary C. Campbell, 2022 - Maxine Campbell, 2022 - Major (retired) Doug Hall, 2023 - Anita Jones, 2024 - Virginia Bjerkelund.
