= Melynda Jarratt =

Canadian historian and author

Melynda Jarratt is a Canadian historian, author and founder of the Canadian War Brides Website. Her research focuses on Canadian war brides of World War II. Her literary works and website aim to draw together the various components of Canadian war bride history.

== Biography ==
Born in 1961 in Bathurst, New Brunswick, she obtained a Bachelor of Arts (Honours) in history from the University of New Brunswick in 1986 and wrote her master's thesis in 1995 on New Brunswick War brides. She appears frequently in the Canadian media as an expert on various historical subjects. Most notably, Immigration to Canada and Canadian nationality law affecting the descendants of war brides, Scottish Highlands and Islands during WWII. Jarratt aims to actively spread awareness on current Celtic and community affairs in New Brunswick, while concurrently working as the executive director of the Fredericton Region Museum.

== Bibliography ==
- Voices of the Left Behind (2005), Dundurn Press
- War Brides : The Stories of the Women Who Left Everything Behind to Follow the Men They Loved (2007), Dundurn Press
- Captured Hearts : New Brunswick's War Brides (2008), Goose Lane Editions
- Letters From Beauly (2016), Goose Lane Editions
- Human Rights in Atlantic Canada (1990)
