= Cultural depictions of amphibians =

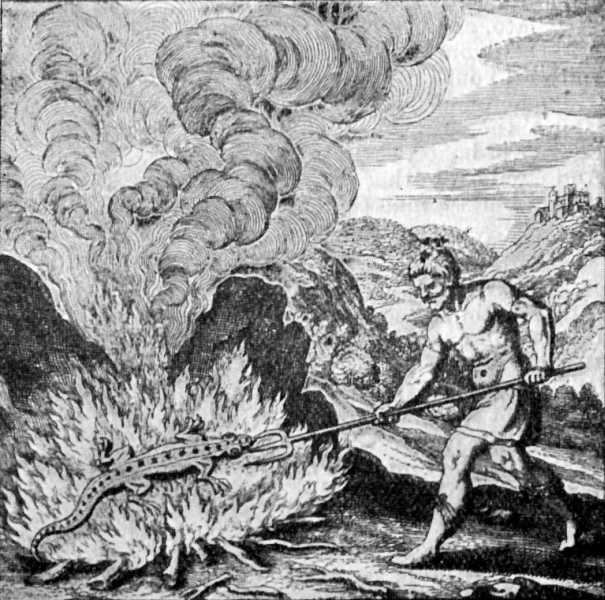
The legendary fire-dwelling Salamander in the Book of Lambspring in Lucas Jennis' Musaeum Hermeticum, 1679 edition

Culture consists of the social behaviour and norms in human societies transmitted through social learning. Amphibians have for centuries appeared in culture. From the fire-dwelling salamander to the frogs (and occasionally toads) of myth and fairytale and the rare use of a newt in literature, amphibians play the role of strange and sometimes repulsive creatures. Frogs however have symbolised fertility, as in Ancient Egypt, Greece and Rome, while in Ancient China they were associated with healing and good fortune in business.

== Context ==
Culture consists of the social behaviour and norms found in human societies and transmitted through social learning. Cultural universals in all human societies include expressive forms like art, music, dance, ritual, religion, and technologies like tool usage, cooking, shelter, and clothing. The concept of material culture covers physical expressions such as technology, architecture and art, whereas immaterial culture includes principles of social organization, mythology, philosophy, literature, and science. This article describes the roles played by amphibians in human culture, so defined.

== Salamander ==
The salamander has been ascribed fantastic and sometimes occult qualities by pre-modern authors (as in the allegorical descriptions of animals in medieval bestiaries) not possessed by the real animal. The legendary salamander is often depicted as a typical salamander in shape, with a lizard-like form, but is usually ascribed an affinity with fire, sometimes specifically elemental fire. In the Renaissance, the salamander was supposed to be able to withstand any heat and even to put out fire.

== Frog ==
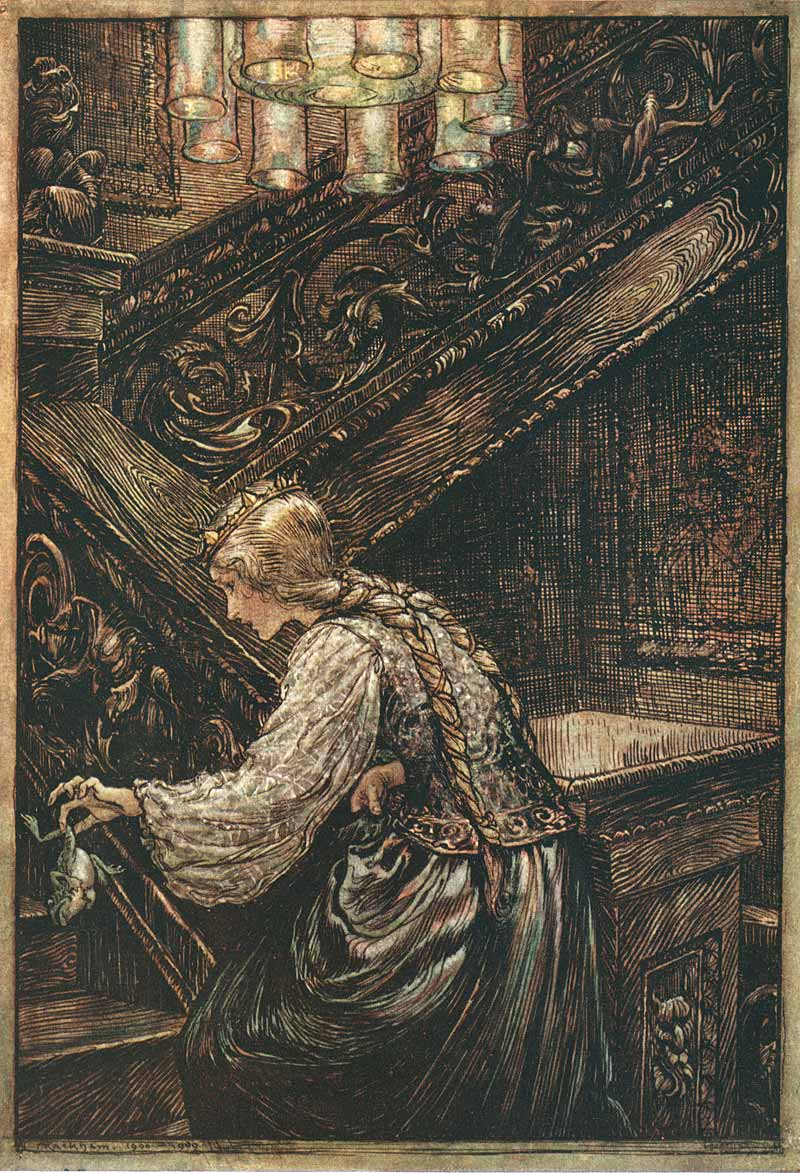
Arthur Rackham's 1909 illustration of the fairy tale of the Brothers Grimm version of "The Frog Prince"

To the ancients in Egypt, Greece and Rome, the frog was a symbol of fertility, and in Egypt actually the object of worship.

A plague of frogs is seen as a punishment in the Old Testament of the Bible.

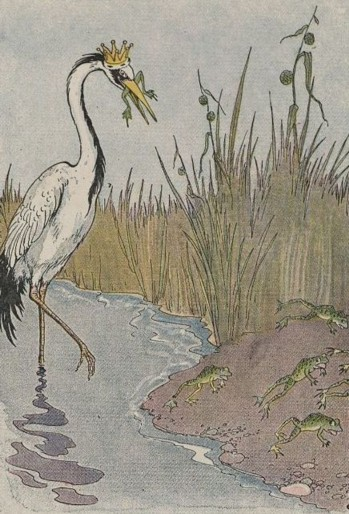
A frog being eaten by King Stork, by Milo Winter to illustrate a 1919 Aesop anthology

Two fables attributed to Aesop, The Frogs Who Desired a King and The Frog and the Ox feature frog characters.

The Frogs is a comic play by Aristophanes. The chorus of frogs sings the famous croaking onomatopoeic refrain: Brekekekèx-koàx-koáx (Greek: Βρεκεκεκὲξ κοὰξ κοάξ). This greatly annoys Dionysus, who engages in a mocking debate with the frogs.

In "The Frog Prince", a spoilt princess reluctantly befriends the Frog Prince, who is magically transformed into a handsome prince when (in the Brothers Grimm version) she throws the frog against a wall. However, in modern versions, she effects the transformation by kissing it instead.

== Toad ==
Toads are often not distinguishable from frogs in popular culture, but Kenneth Grahame's Mr Toad in his 1908 novel The Wind in the Willows is a likeable and popular if selfish and narcissistic comic character. Mr Toad reappears as the lead character in A. A. Milne's 1929 play Toad of Toad Hall, based on the book.

In Chinese culture, the Money Toad (or Frog) Jin Chan appears as a Feng Shui charm for prosperity.

== Newt ==
Newts are traditionally associated with witchcraft. In William Shakespeare's play Macbeth, the witches use "eye of newt" as the first ingredient added to their cauldron.

Newts rarely appear in literature, but Roald Dahl included one crucial to the story as a practical joke on the malevolent Miss Trunchbull, in his novel Matilda.

The Harry Potter character Newt Scamander got his Name from the magical associations to newts.

== See also ==
- List of fictional frogs and toads
