= List of Uncle Remus characters =

This is a list of recurring and/or significant fictional characters in the Uncle Remus books and those in one way or another connected to Br'er Rabbit and his plantation and forest entourage. Excluding the characters of the told tales, which are largely archived, as regards the characters of the novels and frame-stories extraneous to the Uncle Remus series, preference in cataloging goes to the actual narrators of the tales.

Uncle Remus himself appears as framing device and narrator in all the stories (tales, poems and songs in The Tar-Baby and Other Rhymes of Uncle Remus included), except the ones in On the Plantation, Evening Tales and the novels in the Abercrombie family series (although he is sometimes mentioned by the characters). Uncle Remus is also the absolute protagonist in the stories and the sketches reproduced (with modifications or not) in the secondary sections of the books from newspapers such as The Atlanta Constitution.

The little boy from the canonical series of books, that is the unnamed son of Miss Sally and Marse John who never appears in the sections dedicated to the reprint of sketches and jokes with Uncle Remus from the newspapers, is often addressed by Uncle Remus throughout the narrations in The Tar-Baby and Other Rhymes of Uncle Remus as well. From Told by Uncle Remus on, Uncle Remus' listener is the son of the little boy of the previous books, initially more frailer and quieter than his father at his age, and speaks in and elegant and refined way because of the harsh education given to him. The last book in the series, Seven Tales of Uncle Remus, collects old stories hitherto unpublished or published in magazines and which date back to the period the little boy was still the son of Miss Sally and Marse John. However, we should probably exclude the last Br'er Rabbit story in chronological order, "Rabbit Doesn't Go to See Aunt Nancy", because it was presumably created in 1908, when the new little boy was already active.

== Characters ==
Name	Character	Stories in which the character plays a role
Brer Rabbit	a trickster who succeeds by his speed and wits rather than by brawn; called Brer Pop-Eye in one story as this is his name for the "bottom land", as this is his name for the "bottom land"	Uncle Remus Initiates the Little Boy/ The Wonderful Tar-Baby Story (sequel to Uncle Remus Initiates the Little Boy)/ How Mr. Rabbit Was Too Sharp for Mr. Fox (sequel to The Wonderful Tar-Baby Story)/ Mr. Rabbit Grossly Deceives Mr. Fox/ Mr. Fox Is Again Victimized/ Miss Cow Falls a Victim to Mr. Rabbit/ Mr. Terrapin Appears Upon the Scene/ Mr. Wolf Makes a Failure/ The Awful Fate of Mr. Wolf/ Mr. Fox Goes a-Hunting, but Mr. Rabbit Bags the Game/ Old Mr. Rabbit, He's a Good Fisherman/ Mr. Rabbit Nibbles Up the Butter/ Mr. Rabbit Finds His Match at Last/ The Fate of Mr. Jack Sparrow/ How Mr. Rabbit Saved His Meat/ Mr. Rabbit Meets His Match Again/ A Story About the Little Rabbits/ Mr. Rabbit and Mr. Bear/ How Mr. Rabbit Lost His Fine Bushy Tail/ Mr. Terrapin Shows His Strength/ The End of Mr. Bear/ Mr. Fox Gets Into Serious Business/ How Mr. Rabbit Succeeded in Raising a Dust (prose version of the later How Brer Rabbit Raised the Dust)/ The Sad Fate of Mr. Fox/ Mr. Fox and Miss Goose/ Brother Fox Catches Mr. Horse (prose version of the later Brer Rabbit Gets Brer Fox a Hoss)/ Brother Rabbit & the Little Girl/ Brother Rabbit's Astonishing Prank/ Brother Rabbit Secures a Mansion (prose version of the later How Brer Rabbit Got a House)/ Brother Rabbit's Riddle/ Brother Rabbit Breaks Up a Party/ Brother Fox, Brother Rabbit, and King Deer's Daughter/ How Brother Fox Failed to Get His Grapes/ The Moon in the Mill-Pond (prose version of the later Brer Rabbit Finds the Moon in the Mill Pond)/ Brother Rabbit Takes Some Exercise/ Why Brother Bear Has No Tail/ How Brer Rabbit Frightened His Neighbors/ Mr. Man Has Some Meat/ How Brother Rabbit Got the Meat/ Why the Alligator's Back Is Rough/ Brother Wolf Says Grace/ Brother Rabbit and His Famous Foot/ In Some Lady's Garden/ Brother 'Possum Gets in Trouble/ Brother Rabbit's Love Charm/ Brother Rabbit Submits to a Test/ Brother Wolf Falls a Victim/ Brother Rabbit and the Mosquitoes/ The Pimmerly Plum (prose version of the later Brer Rabbit and the Pimmerly Plum)/ Brother Rabbit Gets the Provisions/ Cutta Cord-La!/ Aunt Tempy's Story/ The Fire-Test/ How Brother Fox Was Too Smart/ Brother Wolf Gets in a Warm Place/ Brother Wolf Still in Trouble/ Brother Rabbit Lays In His Beef Supply/ Brother Rabbit & Mr. Wildcat/ Brother Rabbit Pretends to Be Poisoned/ More Trouble for Brother Wolf/ Brother Rabbit Outdoes Mr. Man/ Brother Rabbit Takes a Walk/ Old Grinny Granny Wolf/ How Wattle Weasel Was Caught/ Brother Rabbit Ties Mr. Lion/ Mr. Lion's Sad Predicament/ The Origin of the Ocean/ Brother Rabbit Gets Brother Fox's Dinner/ Why Mr. Dog Runs Brother Rabbit/ Brother Wolf and the Horned Cattle/ Brother Fox and the White Muscadines/ Mr. Hawk & Brother Rabbit/ Brother Fox Makes a Narrow Escape/ Brother Fox's Fish-Trap/ Brother Rabbit Rescues Brother Terrapin/ Crazy Sue's Story/ How Black Snake Caught the Wolf/ How the Terrapin Was Taught to Fly/ Brother Rabbit & the Gingercakes/ Brother Rabbit's Courtship/ [Brer Rabbit an' de Overcoat]/ A French Tar-Baby/ Brother Bear and the Honey Orchard/ Brother Rabbit Has Fun at the Ferry/ Why Brother Wolf Did n't Eat the Little Rabbits/ Mrs. Partridge Has a Fit/ Brother Fox "Smells Smoke"/ Brother Fox Still in Trouble/ Why Brother Fox's Legs Are Black/ Brother Rabbit Frightens Brother Tiger/ Brother Rabbit's Money Mint/ Brother Rabbit Conquers Brother Lion/ Heyo, House! (prose version of the later Hello, House!)/ Little Mr. Thimblefinger and his Queer Country novel (in the frame-story as an aged Brer Rabbit, but he's younger in the stories-within-the stories)/ The Strongest — Who? or Which?/ The Ladder of Lions (sequel to Mr. Lion Hunts for Mr. Man)/ Brother Terrapin's Fiddle-String/ Mr. Rabbit as a Rain-Maker/ How Brother Bear's Hair Was Combed (plain English version of Brother Bear Learns to Comb His Head)/ Mr. Rabbit at Home novel (in the frame-story as an aged Brer Rabbit, but he's younger in the stories-within-the stories)/ Brother Wolf's Two Big Dinners/ How Brother Lion Lost His Wool/ Brother Lion Has a Spell of Sickness (sequel to How Brother Lion Lost His Wool)/ Brer Rabbit and the Goobers/ The Diamond Mine/ Brother Rabbit and the Bee/ Brer Rabbit and the Tar-Baby (rhyming version of The Wonderful Tar-Baby Story and How Mr. Rabbit Was Too Sharp for Mr. Fox)/ De 'Gater and de Rabbit Gizzard (sequel to Why the Alligator's Back Is Rough, rhyming version of the later Brother Rabbit and the Gizzard-Eater)/ A Wishing Song/ Why the Frog Has No Tail (rhyming version of the later Brother Rabbit and Brother Bull-Frog)/ Why the Buzzard's Head is Bald/ Brer Rabbit's Gigglin'-Place (rhyming version of the later Brother Rabbit's Laughing-Place)/ Mr. Rabbit Run Fur— Mr. Rabbit Run Fas'/ How Wiley Wolf Rode in the Bag/ Brother Rabbit's Laughing Place (prose version of Brer Rabbit's Gigglin'-Place)/ Brother Rabbit and the Chickens/ Little Mister Cricket and the Other Creatures/ When Brother Rabbit Was King/ How Old Craney-Crow Lost His Head (as Brer Pop-Eye; new version of the [Untitled story] inside Aaron in the Wildwoods)/ Brother Fox Follows the Fashion (sequel to How Old Craney-Crow Lost His Head, new version of How Brother Bear's Hair Was Combed)/ Why the Turkey Buzzard Is Bald-Headed (prose version of Why the Buzzard's Head is Bald)/ Brother Deer an' King Sun's Daughter/ Brother Rabbit's Cradle/ Brother Rabbit and Brother Bull-Frog (prose version of Why the Frog Has No Tail)/ Brother Rabbit and the Gizzard-Eater (prose version of De 'Gater and de Rabbit Gizzard)/ Brother Rabbit and Miss Nancy/ The Creeturs Go to the Barbecue/ Brer Rabbit's Frolic (sequel to The Creeturs Go to the Barbecue)/ Brer Rabbit Treats the Creeturs to a Race/ Brer Rabbit's Flying Trip (also called ol' frien' Wobble-nose here)/ Brer Rabbit and the Gold Mine (new version of The Diamond Mine)/ Brer Rabbit Gets Brer Fox a Hoss (rhyming version of Brother Fox Catches Mr. Horse)/ Brer Rabbit Finds the Moon in the Mill Pond (rhyiming version of The Moon in the Mill-Pond)/ How Mr. Lion Lost His Wool (new version of How Brother Lion Lost His Wool)/ How Brer Rabbit Got a House (rhyming version of Brother Rabbit Secures a Mansion)/ Brer Rabbit and the Partridge Nest/ The Story of the Doodang (new version of The Fate of the Diddypawn)/ Hello, House! (rhyming version of Heyo, House!)/ Brer Rabbit Has Trouble with the Moon (new version of The Rabbit and the Moon)/ Brer Rabbit Causes Brer Fox to Lose His Hide (sequel to How Mr. Lion Lost His Wool, new version of Brother Lion Has a Spell of Sickness)/ How Brer Rabbit Saved Brer B'ar's Life/ Uncle Remus Sings a Song/ How Brer Rabbit Raised the Dust (rhyming version of How Mr. Rabbit Succeeded in Raising a Dust)/ The Story of Teenchy-Tiny Duck/ Brer Rabbit and the Pimmerly Plum (rhyming version of The Pimmerly Plum)/ The Story of Brer Fox and Little Mr. Cricket/ Brother Rabbit's Bear Hunt/ Impty-Umpty and the Blacksmith (part sequel, part remake of Jacky-My-Lantern)/ Taily-Po/ Brother Rabbit, Brother Fox, and Two Fat Pullets (in part a sequel to Mr. Man Has Some Meat)/ How Brother Rabbit Brought Family Trouble on Brother Fox (sequel to Brother Rabbit, Brother Fox, and Two Fat Pullets; a variation on Brother Lion Has a Spell of Sickness)/ The Most Beautiful Bird in the World/ Brother Rabbit's Barbecue - How Brother Bear Exposed Brother Rabbit at the Barbecue (a single story with one title for the introduction and one for the story itself)/ Brother Bear Learns to Comb His Head (sequel to Brother Rabbit's Barbecue - How Brother Bear Exposed Brother Rabbit at the Barbecue; dialect version of How Brother Bear's Hair Was Combed)/ Why the Bear Is a Wrestler (dialect version of Why the Bear Is a Wrestler from Mr. Rabbit at Home)/ Brother Rabbit Doesn't Go to See Aunt Nancy
Br'er Fox	Brer Rabbit's most common nemesis; considers himself the smartest animal despite being duped continuously	Uncle Remus Initiates the Little Boy/ The Wonderful Tar-Baby Story (sequel to Uncle Remus Initiates the Little Boy)/ How Mr. Rabbit Was Too Sharp for Mr. Fox (sequel to The Wonderful Tar-Baby Story)/ Mr. Rabbit Grossly Deceives Mr. Fox/ Mr. Fox Is Again Victimized/ Mr. Fox Is "Outdone" by Mr. Buzzard/ Mr. Terrapin Appears upon the Scene/ Mr. Wolf Makes a Failure/ Mr. Fox Tackles Old Man Tarrypin/ Mr. Fox and the Deceitful Frogs/ Mr. Fox Goes a-Hunting, but Mr. Rabbit Bags the Game/ Old Mr. Rabbit, He's a Good Fisherman/ Mr. Rabbit Nibbles Up the Butter/ The Fate of Mr. Jack Sparrow/ A Story About the Little Rabbits/ Mr. Rabbit and Mr. Bear/ How Mr. Rabbit Lost His Fine Bushy Tail/ Mr. Terrapin Shows His Strength/ Mr. Fox Gets Into Serious Business/ How Mr. Rabbit Succeeded in Raising a Dust (prose version of the later How Brer Rabbit Raised the Dust)/ The Sad Fate of Mr. Fox/ Mr. Fox and Miss Goose/ Brother Fox Catches Mr. Horse (prose version of the later Brer Rabbit Gets Brer Fox a Hoss)/ How Brother Fox Was Too Smart/ Brother Rabbit's Astonishing Prank/ Brother Rabbit Secures a Mansion (prose version of the later How Brer Rabbit Got a House)/ Brother Rabbit's Riddle/ Brother Rabbit Breaks Up a Party/ Brother Fox, Brother Rabbit, & King Deer's Daughter/ Brother Fox Covets the Quills/ How Brother Fox Failed to Get His Grapes/ Mr. Fox Figures As an Incendiary/ A Dream & a Story/ The Moon in the Mill-Pond (prose version of the later Brer Rabbit Finds the Moon in the Mill Pond)/ Brother Rabbit Takes Some Exercise/ How Brer Rabbit Frightened His Neighbors/ Mr. Man Has Some Meat/ How Brother Rabbit Got the Meat/ In Some Lady's Garden/ The Pimmerly Plum (prose version of the later Brer Rabbit and the Pimmerly Plum)/ Aunt Tempy's Story/ How Brother Fox Was Too Smart/ Brother Rabbit Lays In His Beef Supply/ Mr. Benjamin Ram Defends Himself/ Brother Rabbit Gets Brother Fox's Dinner/ Brother Fox & the White Muscadines/ Brother Fox Makes a Narrow Escape/ Brother Fox's Fish-Trap/ Brother Rabbit Rescues Brother Terrapin/ Why the Guineas Stay Awake/ Why Brother Wolf Did n't Eat the Little Rabbits/ Brother Fox "Smells Smoke"/ Brother Fox Still in Trouble/ Why Brother Fox's Legs Are Black/ Brother Rabbit's Money Mint/ Brother Mud Turtle's Trickery/ [Brer Rabbit an' de Overcoat]/ Mr. Rabbit as a Rain-Maker/ Brother Wolf's Two Big Dinners/ Brother Lion Has a Spell of Sickness (sequel to How Brother Lion Lost His Wool)/ Brer Rabbit and the Goobers/ The Diamond Mine/ Brother Rabbit and the Bee/ Brer Rabbit and the Tar-Baby (rhyming version of The Wonderful Tar-Baby Story and How Mr. Rabbit Was Too Sharp for Mr. Fox)/ A Wishing Song/ Brer Rabbit's Gigglin'-Place (rhyming version of the later Brother Rabbit's Laughing-Place)/ Brother Rabbit's Laughing Place (prose version of Brer Rabbit's Gigglin'-Place)/ Mr. Rabbit Run Fur— Mr. Rabbit Run Fas'/ Brother Rabbit's Laughing-Place (prose version of Brer Rabbit's Gigglin'-Place)/ Brother Rabbit and the Chickens/ Little Mister Cricket and the Other Creatures/ Brother Fox Follows the Fashion (sequel to How Old Craney-Crow Lost His Head and new version of How Brother Bear's Hair Was Combed)/ The Creeturs Go to the Barbecue/ Brer Rabbit's Frolic (sequel to The Creeturs Go to the Barbecue)/ Brer Rabbit Treats the Creeturs to a Race/ Brer Rabbit's Flying Trip/ Brer Rabbit and the Gold Mine (new version of The Diamond Mine)/ Brer Rabbit Gets Brer Fox a Hoss (rhyming version of Brother Fox Catches Mr. Horse)/ How Mr. Lion Lost His Wool (new version of How Brother Lion Lost His Wool)/ How Brer Rabbit Got a House (rhyming version of Brother Rabbit Secures a Mansion)/ Hello, House! (rhyming version of Heyo, House!)/ Brer Rabbit Causes Brer Fox to Lose His Hide (sequel to How Mr. Lion Lost His Wool, new version of Brother Lion Has a Spell of Sickness)/ How Brer Rabbit Raised the Dust (rhyming version of How Mr. Rabbit Succeeded in Raising a Dust)/ The Story of Teenchy-Tiny Duck/ Brer Rabbit and the Pimmerly Plum (rhyming version of The Pimmerly Plum)/ The Story of Brer Fox and Little Mr. Cricket/ Brother Rabbit's Bear Hunt/ Brother Rabbit, Brother Fox, and Two Fat Pullets (in part a sequel to Mr. Man Has Some Meat)/ How Brother Rabbit Brought Family Trouble on Brother Fox (sequel to Brother Rabbit, Brother Fox, and Two Fat Pullets; a variation on Brother Lion Has a Spell of Sickness)/ Brother Rabbit's Barbecue - How Brother Bear Exposed Brother Rabbit at the Barbecue (a single story with one title for the introduction and one for the story itself)/ Brother Rabbit Doesn't Go to See Aunt Nancy
Br'er Wolf, known as Dock Wolf in one story	Brer Rabbit's second-most common antagonist; considers himself the most vicious of the animals	Mr. Wolf Makes a Failure/ The Awful Fate of Mr. Wolf/ How Mr. Rabbit Saved His Meat/ Mr. Terrapin Shows His Strength/ Brother Rabbit's Astonishing Prank/ Brother Rabbit Secures a Mansion (prose version of the later How Brer Rabbit Got a House)/ The Story of the Pigs/ Mr. Benjamin Ram & His Wonderful Fiddle/ A Dream and a Story/ The Moon in the Mill-Pond (prose version of the later Brer Rabbit Finds the Moon in the Mill Pond)/ Brother Rabbit Takes Some Exercise/ How Brer Rabbit Frightened His Neighbors/ Brother Wolf Says Grace/ Brother Rabbit and His Famous Foot/ Brother Wolf Falls a Victim/ Brother Rabbit & the Mosquitoes/ Brother Rabbit Gets the Provisions/ Cutta Cord-La!/ The Fire-Test/ Brother Wolf Gets in a Warm Place/ Brother Wolf Still in Trouble/ Mr. Benjamin Ram Defends Himself/ Brother Rabbit Pretends to Be Poisoned/ More Trouble for Brother Wolf/ Old Grinny Granny Wolf/ Brother Wolf & the Horned Cattle/ Brother Fox Makes a Narrow Escape/ How Black Snake Caught the Wolf/ The Creature with No Claws/ Why Brother Wolf Did n't Eat the Little Rabbits/ Brother Billy Goat Eats His Dinner/ Heyo, House! (prose version of the later Hello, House!)/ [Brer Rabbit an' de Overcoat]/ Why Mr. Billy Goat's Tail Is Short (plain English version of Mr. Goat's Short Tail)/ Mr. Rabbit as a Rain-Maker/ Brother Wolf's Two Big Dinners/ The Diamond Mine/ Brer Rabbit and the Tar-Baby (rhyming version of The Wonderful Tar-Baby Story and How Mr. Rabbit Was Too Sharp for Mr. Fox)/ How Wiley Wolf Rode in the Bag/ Brother Rabbit's Laughing-Place (prose version of Brer Rabbit's Gigglin'-Place)/ Brother Rabbit and the Chickens/ How Old Craney-Crow Lost His Head (as Mr. Dock Wolf; new version of the [Untitled story] inside Aaron in the Wildwoods)/ Brother Rabbit's Cradle/ Why Mr. Dog Is Tame/ The Creeturs Go to the Barbecue/ Brer Rabbit's Frolic (sequel to The Creeturs Go to the Barbecue)/ Brer Rabbit Treats the Creeturs to a Race/ Brer Rabbit's Flying Trip/ Brer Rabbit and the Gold Mine (new version of The Diamond Mine)/ Brer Rabbit Finds the Moon in the Mill Pond (rhyiming version of The Moon in the Mill-Pond)/ How Mr. Lion Lost His Wool (new version of How Brother Lion Lost His Wool)/ How Brer Rabbit Got a House (rhyming version of Brother Rabbit Secures a Mansion)/ How Brer Rabbit Raised the Dust (rhyming version of How Mr. Rabbit Succeeded in Raising a Dust)/ The Story of Teenchy-Tiny Duck/ Brer Rabbit and the Pimmerly Plum (rhyming version of The Pimmerly Plum) Brother Rabbit's Bear Hunt/ Mr. Goat's Short Tail (dialect version of Why Mr. Billy Goat's Tail Is Short)/ Brother Rabbit's Barbecue - How Brother Bear Exposed Brother Rabbit at the Barbecue (a single story with one title for the introduction and one for the story itself)/ Brother Rabbit Doesn't Go to See Aunt Nancy
Brer Tarrypin	a friend of Brer Rabbit who joins him in his mischief and even outdoes him at times	Mr. Terrapin Appears upon the Scene/ Mr. Fox Tackles Old Man Tarrypin/ Mr. Fox and the Deceitful Frogs/ Mr. Rabbit Finds His Match at Last/ Mr. Terrapin Shows His Strength/ Brother Wolf Falls a Victim/ How Mr. Rabbit Succeeded in Raising a Dust (prose version of the later How Brer Rabbit Raised the Dust)/ Brother Terrapin Deceives Brother Buzzard/ Brother Fox Covets the Quills/ Mr. Fox Figures As an Incendiary/ The Moon in the Mill-Pond (prose version of the later Brer Rabbit Finds the Moon in the Mill Pond)/ Why Brother Bear Has No Tail/ The Pimmerly Plum (prose version of the later Brer Rabbit and the Pimmerly Plum)/ The Fire-Test/ Brother Wolf Gets in a Warm Place/ Brother Wolf Still in Trouble/ Old Brother Terrapin Gets Some Fish/ Brother Rabbit Rescues Brother Terrapin/ How the Terrapin Was Taught to Fly/ Brother Terrapin's Fiddle-String/ How Brer Tarrypin Learned to Fly (rhyming version of How the Terrapin Was Taught to Fly)/ Brer Rabbit Finds the Moon in the Mill Pond (rhyiming version of The Moon in the Mill-Pond)
Br'er Bear, also called Brer B'ar, rarely Billy B'ar	considers himself the strongest of the animals; frequently duped by smaller creatures	Mr. Rabbit and Mr. Bear/ Mr. Bear Catches Old Mr. Bull-Frog (sequel to Mr. Rabbit and Mr. Bear)/ Old Mr. Rabbit, He's a Good Fisherman/ Mr. Terrapin Shows His Strength/ Why Mr. Possum Has No Hair on His Tail/ The End of Mr. Bear/ Brother Rabbit's Astonishing Prank/ Brother Rabbit Secures a Mansion (prose version of the later How Brer Rabbit Got a House)/ Brother Rabbit's Riddle/ The Moon in the Mill-Pond (prose version of the later Brer Rabbit Finds the Moon in the Mill Pond)/ Brother Rabbit Takes Some Exercise/ Why Brother Bear Has No Tail/ How Brer Rabbit Frightened His Neighbors/ Brother Rabbit Takes a Walk/ Brother Bear and the Honey Orchard/ Brother Rabbit Has Fun at the Ferry/ Mr. Rabbit as a Rain-Maker/ How Brother Bear's Hair Was Combed (plain English version of Brother Bear Learns to Comb His Head)/ Brother Wolf's Two Big Dinners/ Why the Bear Is a Wrestler (plain English version of Why the Bear Is a Wrestler from Seven Tales of Uncle Remus)/ De 'Gater and de Rabbit Gizzard (sequel to Why the Alligator's Back Is Rough, rhyming version of the later Brother Rabbit and the Gizzard-Eater)/ Brer Rabbit's Gigglin'-Place (rhyming version of the later Brother Rabbit's Laughing-Place)/ Brother Rabbit's Laughing-Place (prose version of Brer Rabbit's Gigglin'-Place)/ Brother Rabbit and the Gizzard-Eater (prose version of De 'Gater and de Rabbit Gizzard)/ The Creeturs Go to the Barbecue/ Brer Rabbit's Frolic (sequel to The Creeturs Go to the Barbecue)/ Brother Bear's Big House (new version of [Untitled story] inside Views on the African Exodus)/ Brer Rabbit Treats the Creeturs to a Race/ Brer Rabbit's Flying Trip/ Brer Rabbit and the Gold Mine (new version of The Diamond Mine)/ Brer Rabbit Gets Brer Fox a Hoss (rhyming version of Brother Fox Catches Mr. Horse)/ Brer Rabbit Finds the Moon in the Mill Pond (rhyiming version of The Moon in the Mill-Pond)/ How Brer Rabbit Got a House (rhyming version of Brother Rabbit Secures a Mansion)/ Hello, House! (rhyming version of Heyo, House!) How Brer Rabbit Saved Brer B'ar's Life/ Uncle Remus Sings a Song/ How Brer Rabbit Raised the Dust (rhyming version of How Mr. Rabbit Succeeded in Raising a Dust)/ Brer Rabbit and the Pimmerly Plum (rhyming version of The Pimmerly Plum)/ Brother Rabbit's Bear Hunt/ Brother Rabbit's Barbecue - How Brother Bear Exposed Brother Rabbit at the Barbecue (a single story with one title for the introduction and one for the story itself)/ Brother Bear Learns to Comb His Head (sequel to Brother Rabbit's Barbecue - How Brother Bear Exposed Brother Rabbit at the Barbecue; new version of How Brother Bear's Hair Was Combed)/ Why the Bear Is a Wrestler (dialect version of Why the Bear Is a Wrestler from Mr. Rabbit at Home)/ Brother Rabbit Doesn't Go to See Aunt Nancy
Aunt Tempy, referred to by Uncle Remus as Sis Tempy	a mammy housekeeper of equal authority with Uncle Remus who is elected to accompany the boy on his visits to Uncle Remus when the boy's mother worries about the influence of the visiting Daddy Jack; Aunt Tempy is proud and brusque but good-humored at heart, and is later thrilled to be included as a storyteller in Remus' cabin	Brother Wolf Says Grace/ Spirits, Seen & Unseen/ A Ghost Story/ In Some Lady's Garden/ Brother Rabbit's Love Charm/ Brother Rabbit Gets the Provisions/ Aunt Tempy's Story/ The Cunning Snake/ Brother Rabbit Pretends to Be Poisoned/ More Trouble for Brother Wolf/ Old Grinny Granny Wolf/ Why Mr. Dog Runs Brother Rabbit/ Brother Wolf & the Horned Cattle/ Mr. Hawk & Brother Buzzard/ The Night Before Christmas
Mr. Buzzard, also known as Brer Buzzard and Brer Turkey Buzzard (also spelled Tukkey Buzzard and Tukky Buzzud)	an opportunist who would happily eat any of the other animals but is admired for his ability to fly	Mr. Fox Is Again Victimized/ Mr. Fox Is "Outdone" by Mr. Buzzard/ Miss Cow Falls a Victim to Mr. Rabbit/ Mr. Rabbit Finds His Match at Last/ Mr. Rabbit Meets His Match Again/ Brother Terrapin Deceives Brother Buzzard/ A Dream and a Story/ Brother Rabbit Lays In His Beef Supply/ Mr. Hawk and Brother Buzzard/ How the Terrapin Was Taught to Fly/ A Singing-Match (plain English version of Mr. Crow and Brother Buzzard)/ The Fate of the Diddypawn/ How Brer Tarrypin Learned to Fly (rhyming version of How the Terrapin Was Taught to Fly)/ Brer Rabbit's Flying Trip/ The Story of the Doodang (new version of The Fate of the Diddypawn)/ Mr. Crow and Brother Buzzard (dialect version of A Singing-Match)
Mister Man, referred to by Daddy Jack as Buckra Man (i.e. white man), and Jerry in a story, while Whaley-Joe in another	a human antagonist of all the animals except Mr. Dog	The Sad Fate of Mr. Fox/ Old Mr. Rabbit, He's a Good Fisherman/ Brother Rabbit and the Little Girl/ How Brother Fox Was Too Smart/ Mr. Lion Hunts for Mr. Man/ Mr. Man Has Some Meat/ How Brother Rabbit Got the Meat/ In Some Lady's Garden/ Brother 'Possum Gets in Trouble/ Brother Rabbit Outdoes Mr. Man/ Mr. Lion's Sad Predicament/ Brother Rabbit and the Chickens/ Brother Rabbit's Cradle/ Why Mr. Dog Is Tame/ The Ladder of Lions (sequel to Mr. Lion Hunts for Mr. Man)/ How Brother Lion Lost His Wool/ The Rabbit and the Moon/ Brother Rabbit and the Gizzard-Eater (here called Jerry; sequel to Why the Alligator's Back Is Rough, prose version of De 'Gater and de Rabbit Gizzard)/ Brother Rabbit and Miss Nancy/ The Creeturs Go to the Barbecue/ How Mr. Lion Lost His Wool/ Brer Rabbit Has Trouble with the Moon (new version of The Rabbit and the Moon)/ Taily-Po (addressed by the monster as Whaley-Joe)
Tildy	a flighty maid who joins in listening to Uncle Remus' tales despite his animosity toward her; Tildy eventually endears herself and is even allowed to tell tales of her own	How Mr. Rooster Lost His Dinner/ Brother Rabbit Breaks Up a Party/ Brother Fox, Brother Rabbit, & King Deer's Daughter/ Brother Terrapin Deceives Brother Buzzard/ African Jack/ Why the Alligator's Back Is Rough/ A Ghost Story/ Brother Rabbit's Love Charm/ Brother Rabbit Pretends to Be Poisoned/ Brother Wolf and the Horned Cattle/ Mr. Hawk and Brother Buzzard/ Mr. Hawk & Brother Rabbit/ The Night Before Christmas
Brer Bull-Frog	convinces other animals to fall into the pond by promising things like "Knee-deep! Knee-deep!" in his croaking cadence; dresses exquisitely in a soldier's hat with green and white speckles, a long green coat, satin breeches, a white silk waistcoat, shoes with silver buckles, and a green umbrella	Mr. Fox and the Deceitful Frogs/ Mr. Bear Catches Old Mr. Bull-Frog (sequel to Mr. Rabbit and Mr. Bear)/ Why the Frog Has No Tail (rhyming version of the later Brother Rabbit and Brother Bull-Frog)/ Brother Rabbit and Brother Bull-Frog (prose version of Why the Frog Has No Tail)
Mr. Lion, sometimes referred to as King Lion or Brer Lion	ruler of the other creatures although he is killed by Miss Cow in one story and fooled by Brer Rabbit & Mr. Cricket more than once	Mr. Lion Hunts for Mr. Man/ Why the Guinea-Fowls Are Speckled/ Brother Rabbit Ties Mr. Lion/ Mr. Lion's Sad Predicament/ The Origin of the Ocean/ Brother Rabbit Conquers Brother Lion/ The Ladder of Lions (sequel to Mr. Lion Hunts for Mr. Man)/ How Brother Lion Lost His Wool/ Brother Lion Has a Spell of Sickness (sequel to How Brother Lion Lost His Wool)/ Little Mister Cricket and the Other Creatures/ When Brother Rabbit Was King (he is only called the King, it is not specified if he is a King Lion but the illustrations depict him as such)/ How Mr. Lion Lost His Wool (new version of How Brother Lion Lost His Wool)/ Brer Rabbit Causes Brer Fox to Lose His Hide (sequel to How Mr. Lion Lost His Wool, new version of Brother Lion Has a Spell of Sickness)/ Brother Rabbit, Brother Fox, and Two Fat Pullets (in part a sequel to Mr. Man Has Some Meat)/ How Brother Rabbit Brought Family Trouble on Brother Fox (sequel to Brother Rabbit, Brother Fox, and Two Fat Pullets; a variation on Brother Lion Has a Spell of Sickness)
Daddy Jack	a very old man who was born in Africa and is considered by some to be a sorcerer; a friend of Uncle Remus and a suitor of Tildy	African Jack/ Why the Alligator's Back Is Rough/ Spirits, Seen & Unseen/ A Ghost Story/ In Some Lady's Garden/ Brother 'Possum Gets in Trouble/ Brother Rabbit's Love Charm/ Cutta Cord-La!/ The Cunning Snake/ Old Grinny Granny Wolf/ Mr. Lion's Sad Predicament/ The Wise Bird & the Foolish Bird/ The Night Before Christmas
Miss Meadows	leading figure of a group of human women who admire Brer Rabbit's tricks on the other animals	Mr. Rabbit Grossly Deceives Mr. Fox/ Mr. Terrapin Shows His Strength/ How Mr. Rabbit Succeeded in Raising a Dust (prose version of the later How Brer Rabbit Raised the Dust)/ Mr. Benjamin Ram & His Wonderful Fiddle/ How Brother Fox Failed to Get His Grapes/ Brother Rabbit's Astonishing Prank/ The Moon in the Mill-Pond (prose version of the later Brer Rabbit Finds the Moon in the Mill Pond)/ Brother Rabbit's Courtship/ Little Mr. Thimblefinger and His Queer Country novel (in the frame-story as an aged Miss — now Mrs. — Meadows)/ Mr. Rabbit at Home novel (in the frame-story as an aged Miss — now Mrs. — Meadows)/ Mr. Rabbit Run Fur— Mr. Rabbit Run Fas'/ Brer Rabbit's Frolic (sequel to The Creeturs Go to the Barbecue)/ Brer Rabbit Finds the Moon in the Mill Pond (rhyiming version of The Moon in the Mill-Pond)/ Hello, House! (rhyming version of Heyo, House!)/ How Brer Rabbit Raised the Dust (rhyming version of How Mr. Rabbit Succeeded in Raising a Dust)
Br'er Possum	often a scapegoat for Brer Rabbit's misdeeds	Why Mr. Possum Loves Peace/ Mr. Rabbit Nibbles Up the Butter/ Brother Wolf Falls a Victim/ Brother Rabbit Secures a Mansion (prose version of the later How Brer Rabbit Got a House)/ How Mr. Rabbit Succeeded in Raising a Dust (prose version of the later How Brer Rabbit Raised the Dust)/ Why Mr. Possum Has No Hair on His Tail/ Brother 'Possum Gets in Trouble/ Brer Rabbit Treats the Creeturs to a Race/ How Brer Rabbit Got a House (rhyming version of Brother Rabbit Secures a Mansion)
Br'er Coon, also known as Mr. Coon	a fighter who looks down on Brer Possum for playing dead; he is assisted by Brer Rabbit in killing some frogs	Why Mr. Possum Loves Peace/ Old Mr. Rabbit, He's a Good Fisherman/ Brother Rabbit Takes Some Exercise/ Brother Wolf Falls a Victim/ Brother Rabbit Secures a Mansion (prose version of the later How Brer Rabbit Got a House)/ How Mr. Rabbit Succeeded in Raising a Dust (prose version of the later How Brer Rabbit Raised the Dust)/ [Untitled story] inside Views on the African Exodus/ Brother Rabbit and the Gingercakes/ Mr. Rabbit as a Rain-Maker/ How Old Craney-Crow Lost His Head (new version of the [Untitled story] inside Aaron in the Wildwoods)/ The Creeturs Go to the Barbecue/ Brer Rabbit's Frolic (sequel to The Creeturs Go to the Barbecue)/ Brer Rabbit Treats the Creeturs to a Race/ Brer Rabbit Finds the Moon in the Mill Pond (rhyiming version of The Moon in the Mill-Pond)/ How Brer Rabbit Got a House (rhyming version of Brother Rabbit Secures a Mansion)/ Uncle Remus Sings a Song
Mr. Dog, also referred to as Brer Dog	becomes domesticated, getting him fed regularly but putting him at enmity with the other animals	Why Mr. Possum Loves Peace/ Mr. Fox and Miss Goose/ Why Mr. Dog Runs Brother Rabbit/ Why Mr. Billy Goat's Tail Is Short (plain English version of Mr. Goat's Short Tail)/ When Brother Rabbit Was King/ Why Mr. Dog Is Tame/ Mr. Goat's Short Tail (dialect version of Why Mr. Billy Goat's Tail Is Short)
Miss Fox	Br'er Fox's wife; falls prey to some of Brer Rabbit's most disgusting tricks, usually involving her unknowing cannibalism or murder of her husband	The Sad Fate of Mr. Fox/ Brother Fox Covets the Quills/ Aunt Tempy's Story/ Brother Rabbit's Laughing-Place (prose version of Brer Rabbit's Gigglin'-Place, here Br'er Fox recalls her warning before he left the house against Br'er Rabbit's tricks)/ Brother Fox Follows the Fashion (sequel to How Old Craney-Crow Lost His Head, new version of How Brother Bear's Hair Was Combed)/ Brother Rabbit, Brother Fox, and Two Fat Pullets (in part a sequel to Mr. Man Has Some Meat)/ How Brother Rabbit Brought Family Trouble on Brother Fox (sequel to Brother Rabbit, Brother Fox, and Two Fat Pullets; a variation on Brother Lion Has a Spell of Sickness)
Kubs and Klibs, known as Simmon and Sue in a later story	Miss B'ar's children	Brother Rabbit's Astonishing Prank/ Brother Rabbit and His Famous Foot (one of them, here Kubs and Klibs are Jedge Bear's sons)/ How The Bear Nursed the Little Alligator (as a pair of unnamed siblings)/ Brother Bear's Big House (as Simmon and Sue; new version of [Untitled story] inside Views on the African Exodus)/ How Brer Rabbit Got a House (one only, unnamed; rhyming version of Brother Rabbit Secures a Mansion)
Cousin Wildcat	also called Mr. Wildcat, he's one of the most deadly creatures; Brer Rabbit tricks an unwitting Brer Fox to attack Cousin Wildcat and later avoids revenge from Cousin Wildcat; Mr. Wildcat he convinces a foreign bird in the swamp to have its head blown off	How Brother Fox Was Too Smart/ Brother Rabbit and Mr. Wildcat/ The Creature with No Claws/ [Untitled story] inside Aaron in the Wildwoods/
Brer Elephen, also known as Mr. Elephant	considers himself the strongest of the creatures- not aggressive, but can be dangerous due to his size	The Story of the Deluge, and How it Came About/ Brother Rabbit Frightens Brother Tiger/ Little Mister Cricket and the Other Creatures/ Uncle Remus Sings a Song
Miss Cow	an imposing matriarch who can only be unsettled by the antics of Brer Rabbit	Miss Cow Falls a Victim to Mr. Rabbit/ Brother Rabbit's Astonishing Prank/ Why the Guinea-Fowls Are Speckled/ A Wishing Song
Miss Tarrypin	Brer Tarrypin's wife who helps him fool Brer Rabbit in a race	Mr. Rabbit Finds His Match at Last
Miss Wolf	Br'er Wolf's wife and accomplice; has a daughter which Brer Rabbit aims to marry in one story	How Brer Rabbit Frightened His Neighbors/ Mr. Benjamin Ram and His Wonderful Fiddle/ Brother Rabbit and His Famous Foot/ Brother Rabbit & the Mosquitoes/ Brer Rabbit's Gigglin'-Place (rhyming version of the later Brother Rabbit's Laughing-Place)/ How Wiley Wolf Rode in the Bag
Mr. Rooster	an avian snob who considers himself above the food of other birds	How Mr. Rooster Lost His Dinner/ Why the Hawk Catches Chickens
King Deer	a wealthy landowner with an attractive heiress and a herd of goats	Brother Fox, Brother Rabbit, & King Deer's Daughter
Br'er Alligater, also called Brer Gater, Brer Yallergater or Yalligater	an enemy of Brer Rabbit, who made B'er 'Gater's skin rough and thick by tricking him into a fiery field	Why the Alligator's Back Is Rough/ De 'Gater and de Rabbit Gizzard (sequel to Why the Alligator's Back Is Rough, rhyming version of the later Brother Rabbit and the Gizzard-Eater)/ Brother Rabbit and the Gizzard-Eater (sequel to Why the Alligator's Back Is Rough, prose version of De 'Gater and de Rabbit Gizzard)
Mr. Mud Turkle	a friend and accomplice of Brer Rabbit whose exploits, like those of Brer Tarrypin, often involve his shell	Why Brother Bear Has No Tail/ Brother Mud Turtle's Trickery/ How Old Craney-Crow Lost His Head (new version of the [Untitled story] inside Aaron in the Wildwoods)
Aunt Mammy-Bammy Big-Money	Brer Rabbit's mother, a Rabbit-Witch who gives him supernatural help	Brother Rabbit and His Famous Foot/ Brother Rabbit Submits to a Test/ Brother Wolf Falls a Victim/ Brother Lion Has a Spell of Sickness (sequel to How Brother Lion Lost His Wool, here the character appears in a Brer Rabbit's flashback totally invented by him)/ The Diamond Mine (as Brer Rabbit's great-grandmother)/ Brer Rabbit Causes Brer Fox to Lose His Hide (she appears in a Brer Rabbit's flashback totally invented by him; sequel to How Mr. Lion Lost His Wool, new version of Brother Lion Has a Spell of Sickness)/ Taily-Po
Missy 'Gator	loses her children to a hungry bear cub which she employs to watch over them	How the Bear Nursed the Little Alligator
Mr. Bull, also called Brer Bull	oversees a convention of horned cattle which Brer Wolf attempts to infiltrate; later transforms himself into a human to attempt to marry a woman	Brother Wolf and the Horned Cattle/ Why Brother Bull Growls and Grumbles/ Brother Rabbit's Laughing-Place (prose version of Brer Rabbit's Gigglin'-Place)
Mr. Hawk	a bird of prey who is fooled by Brer Rabbit and eventually eaten by Brer Buzzard when the Hawk impales himself on a fencepost by mistake	Mr. Hawk and Brother Buzzard/ Mr. Hawk and Brother Rabbit/ Why the Hawk Catches Chickens
Mr. Black Snake, also referred to as Mr. Billy Black Snake	stores food in a magical burrow to last him through a famine	How Old Craney-Crow Lost His Head (new version of the [Untitled story] inside Aaron in the Wildwoods)/ How Black Snake Caught the Wolf
Br'er Polecat	a bossy and imperious character who tries to take things that aren't his	The Rattlesnake and the Polecat/ [Untitled story] inside Views on the African Exodus/ Brother Rabbit and the Gingercakes/ Brother Bear's Big House (new version of [Untitled story] inside Views on the African Exodus)
Br'er Rattlesnake	locks out Brer Polecat when the Polecat attempts to invade his house	The Rattlesnake and the Polecat
Jerry	a man confined to a tree by Br'er Bear during a flood	Brother Rabbit and the Gizzard-Eater (sequel to Why the Alligator's Back Is Rough, prose version of De 'Gater and de Rabbit Gizzard)
Br'er Tiger, also called Mr. Tiger	considers himself the prettiest and most vicious of the creatures	Brother Rabbit Frightens Brother Tiger/ Why the Bear Is a Wrestler (plain English version of Why the Bear Is a Wrestler from Seven Tales of Uncle Remus)/ Little Mister Cricket and the Other Creatures/ Why the Bear Is a Wrestler (dialect version of Why the Bear Is a Wrestler from Mr. Rabbit at Home)
Br'er Billy Goat, also referred to as Brother Goat or Mr. Goat	he lies his way out of a dangerous situation, much the same as Br'er Rabbit or Brer Tarrypin	Brother Billy Goat Eats His Dinner/ A French Tar-Baby (named Brother Goat in the story, while Brother Billy Goat in the Introduction)/ Why Mr. Billy Goat's Tail Is Short (plain English version of Mr. Goat's Short Tail)/ Mr. Goat's Short Tail (dialect version of Why Mr. Billy Goat's Tail Is Short)
Sis Swamp Owl, also referred to as Miss Swamp Owl	said to create hurricanes by flapping her wings deep in a swamp	Where the Harrycane Comes From/ The Most Beautiful Bird in the World
Mr. Owl	often in tales explaining the origin of his verse	The Story of the Owl/ Mr. Rabbit Run Fur— Mr. Rabbit Run Fas'
Jedge Bear	(judge of animales, not the usual Mr. Bear)	Brother Rabbit Breaks Up a Party/ Brother Rabbit and His Famous Foot /
Simon Swamp Owl	from the swamp to discuss what action to take against Br'er Rabbit	Brer Rabbit's Flying Trip/ Uncle Remus Sings a Song
Grandaddy Cricket, also known as Mr. Crickley Cricket and Brer Cricket	a fife player who becomes disfigured when his playing drives a human to attack him but later becomes a trickster like Br'er Rabbit	Why Mr. Cricket Has Elbows on his Legs/ Little Mister Cricket and the Other Creatures/ The Story of Brer Fox and Little Mr. Cricket
Wiley Wolf	one of Br'er Wolf's heirs, boiled to death when his protector gets him mixed up with Riley Rabbit	How Wiley Wolf Rode in the Bag
Mrs. Tiger	Br'er Tiger's wife	Why the Bear Is a Wrestler (plain English version of Why the Bear Is a Wrestler from Seven Tales of Uncle Remus)/ Why the Bear Is a Wrestler (dialect version of Why the Bear Is a Wrestler from Mr. Rabbit at Home)
Smat	reckless young man, who gets his head straight when his father and brother are kidnapped by King Stuff	The Shoemaker Who Made but One Shoe/
King Stuff	king of a country in the deep forest who imprisons anyone who (unknowingly) speaks his name during an accusation	The Shoemaker Who Made but One Shoe/
Mum, the Man in the Moon	small, bearded man responsible for the phases of the moon, who helps young Smat win against King Stuff	The Shoemaker Who Made but One Shoe/
The Woog	monster with green glasses in the Looking-glass country, he wants to exterminate all the fairies	The Woog and the Weeze/
The Weeze	tall man who chases the Woog till he defeats him in the Looking-glass country	The Woog and the Weeze/
Head Monkey	leader of the monkeys, goes to the Wise Man to put an end to the age-old dispute between Monkeys and Dogs	A Mountain of Gold
Oldest of All the Rabbits	Br'er Rabbit's ancestor living near the Moon, acts as a messenger between the Moon and Mr. Man	The Rabbit and the Moon
Poor farmer's sons	little boy and little girl who visit Brother Drouth and Uncle Rain to get them out of the misery they have brought them into	Uncle Rain and Brother Drouth/ The Snow-White Goat and the Coal-Black Sheep/ The Butting Cow and the Hitting Stick
Brother Drouth	drouth personified who gives a little girl a magical snow-white goat distributor of wealth, and a magical walking-stick	Uncle Rain and Brother Drouth/ The Butting Cow and the Hitting Stick
Uncle Rain, also known as Cousin Rain	rain personified who gives a little boy a magical coal-black sheep with long horns distributor of wealth, and a magical cow which gives golden butter; he later shows up to ruin an animal race	Uncle Rain and Brother Drouth/ The Butting Cow and the Hitting Stick/ Brer Rabbit Treats the Creeturs to a Race (as Cousin Rain)
Craney-Crow, also referred to as Great-Grandaddy Crane	strange bird who, having just arrived in the Long Cane Swamp in Middle Georgia because of a hurricane, sees the birds sleeping with their heads covered and believes that they do not have it, he is convinced by the inhabitants of the swamp to have his head cut off too to adapt to local use	[Untitled story] inside Aaron in the Wildwoods (unidentified in this story)/ How Old Craney-Crow Lost His Head (new version of the [Untitled story] inside Aaron in the Wildwoods)
Miss Buzzard	a filthy housekeeper who attempts to starve Br'er Rabbit to death in order to feed him to her children	Why the Buzzard's Head is Bald/ Why the Turkey Buzzard Is Bald-Headed (prose version of Why the Buzzard's Head is Bald)/ The Most Beautiful Bird in the World
Jacky-My-Lantern	a blacksmith who fooled the Devil but was denied heaven so now lingers as a ghost after death	Jacky-My-Lantern/ Impty-Umpty and the Blacksmith (unnamed here; part sequel, part remake of Jacky-My-Lantern)
the Pig siblings: Big, Little, Speckle, & Runt	are outwitted and eaten by Br'er Wolf, except the smallest and cleverest, Runt	The Story of the Pigs
Minnyminny Morack & Follerlinsko	two magical dogs who save their owner	The Little Boy & His Dogs/ The Man & the Wild Cattle
the Moon, also known as Unk' Moon	a gender-changing character which stars in stories explaining its appearance or cycles	The Rabbit and the Moon/ Why the Moon's Face Is Smutty/ The Sun Takes a Holiday (as a young boy)/ Br'er Rabbit Has Trouble with the Moon (new version of The Rabbit and the Moon)
Tinktum Tidy	a brave but foolish man who lies his way through various animal possessions in his quest to find soldiers for his king	How the King Recruited His Army
Miss Sally	wife of the plantation's owner (Marse John), frequently mentioned by Uncle Remus but rarely appearing as a character herself in the frame-stories of the tales, however the characters vividly recall her actions and words in flashbacks and she is really present in the sketches distinct from the tales	Uncle Remus Initiates the Little Boy/ The Wonderful Tar-Baby Story (sequel to Uncle Remus Initiates the Little Boy)/ The Fate of Mr. Jack Sparrow (Uncle Remus recalls what she said that morning)/ A Story About the Little Rabbits/ Why Mr. Possum Has No Hair on His Tail (Uncle Remus recalls what she said days ago about another family's children)/ A Story of the War/ The Phonograph/ As a Weather Prophet (Uncle Remus recalls her observations from the day)/ Brother Fox Catches Mr. Horse (Uncle Remus recalls her actions of the day; prose version of the later Brer Rabbit Gets Brer Fox a Hoss)/ How the Birds Talk/ The Reason Why (introduction to Told by Uncle Remus)/ Why Mr. Cricket Has Elbows on His Legs/ Little Mister Cricket and the Other Creatures (Uncle Remus recalls her past actions and words)/ Why the Turkey Buzzard Is Bald-Headed (prose version of Why the Buzzard's Head is Bald)/ Brer Rabbit Causes Brer Fox to Lose His Hide (the little boy recalls her words; sequel to How Mr. Lion Lost His Wool, new version of Brother Lion Has a Spell of Sickness)/ Uncle Remus Receives a Letter (Uncle Remus recalls her actions)/ Brother Rabbit's Bear Hunt/ Taily-Po (the little boy recalls her words)/ Brother Rabbit's Barbecue - How Brother Bear Exposed Brother Rabbit at the Barbecue (a single story with one title for the introduction and one for the story itself)
Marse John	owner of the plantation, frequently mentioned by Uncle Remus but rarely appearing as a character himself, he's more present in the sketches distinct from the tales; he's Miss Sally's husband and the father of the little boy of the first five Uncle Remus books	How the Birds Talk/A Story of the War/ Uncle Remus Receives a Letter
Miss Sally's daughter-in-law	wife of the little boy from the first five Uncle Remus books, mother of the new little boy who will become a listener of Uncle Remus tales and to whom she has given a strict urban education	Why Mr. Cricket Has Elbows on His Legs/ Why the Turkey Buzzard Is Bald-Headed (prose version of Why the Buzzard's Head is Bald)/ Brother Rabbit and Miss Nancy/ Uncle Remus Receives a Letter (the little boy narrates her actions and words in a letter)/ Brother Rabbit's Bear Hunt/ Taily-Po (the little boy recalls her words)
Jack Sparrer	killed for being a tattletale	The Fate of Mr. Jack Sparrow/ The Story of the Owl
de Ole Boy, also referred to as De Bad Man or Impty-Umpty, in a tale he presents himself in the mortal guise of de Black Man	the Devil, who attempts to reap souls to Hell	Jacky-My-Lantern/ Impty-Umpty and the Blacksmith (part sequel, part remake of Jacky-My-Lantern)
Tobe	Miss Fox's son	The Sad Fate of Mr. Fox/ Brother Fox Covets the Quills/ Brother Rabbit, Brother Fox, and Two Fat Pullets (more Brer Fox and Miss Fox's children, all unnamed)
Miss Goose	saved from Brer Fox by Brer Rabbit	Mr. Fox and Miss Goose
Janey the Little Gal	tricked into freeing Brer Rabbit from Mister Man	Brother Rabbit and the Little Girl/ In Some Lady's Garden
Mr. Horse	Br'er Rabbit ties Br'er Fox to his tail, he kicks and tosses him	Brother Fox Catches Mr. Horse (as such only in the title, called "de Hoss" in the story; prose version of the later Brer Rabbit Gets Brer Fox a Hoss)/ Brer Rabbit Gets Brer Fox a Hoss (unnamed; rhyming version of Brother Fox Catches Mr. Horse)
Miss B'ar	Brer B'ar's wife	Brother Rabbit's Astonishing Prank/ How Brer Rabbit Frightened His Neighbors/ Brother Rabbit and His Famous Foot (here Jedge Bear's wife)/ Brother Bear and the Honey Orchard/ How Brother Bear's Hair Was Combed (plain English version of Brother Bear Learns to Comb His Head)/ Brother Bear's Big House (new version of [Untitled story] inside Views on the African Exodus)/ Brother Rabbit's Bear Hunt/ Brother Bear Learns to Comb His Head (sequel to Brother Rabbit's Barbecue - How Brother Bear Exposed Brother Rabbit at the Barbecue; dialect version of How Brother Bear's Hair Was Combed)
Benjermun Ram	a celebrated fiddler	Mr. Benjamin Ram and His Wonderful Fiddle/ Mr. Benjamin Ram Defends Himself/ Brother Deer an' King Sun's Daughter (Brer Deer recalls his encounter with him)
Gran'sir' Gray Fox, also called Mr. Billy Gray Fox	Br'er Fox's ancestral patriarch	Brother Rabbit's Riddle/ How Old Craney-Crow Lost His Head (new version of the [Untitled story] inside Aaron in the Wildwoods)
Miss Rabbit	Br'er Rabbit's wife	Uncle Remus Initiates the Little Boy/ Miss Cow Falls a Victim to Mr. Rabbit/ The Awful Fate of Mr. Wolf/ How Brer Rabbit Frightened His Neighbors/ Brother Rabbit and His Famous Foot/ Brother Rabbit Submits to a Test/ Brother Wolf Gets in a Warm Place/ Brother Rabbit Conquers Brother Lion/ Brer Rabbit and the Goobers/ Brother Rabbit and the Chickens/ Brother Deer an' King Sun's Daughter (Br'er Rabbit recalls her words of that morning)/ Brer Rabbit's Frolic (sequel to The Creeturs Go to the Barbecue; here Br'er Rabbit falsely recalls her and their children's dancing that morning, illustrations of the book show this scene)/ Brer Rabbit and the Gold Mine (new version of The Diamond Mine)/ Brother Rabbit's Bear Hunt/ Brother Rabbit, Brother Fox, and Two Fat Pullets/ How Brother Rabbit Brought Family Trouble on Brother Fox (sequel to Brother Rabbit, Brother Fox, and Two Fat Pullets; a variation on Brother Lion Has a Spell of Sickness)/ Brother Bear Learns to Comb His Head (sequel to Brother Rabbit's Barbecue - How Brother Bear Exposed Brother Rabbit at the Barbecue; dialect version of How Brother Bear's Hair Was Combed)
Brer Rabbit's chilluns	undifferentiated Br'er Rabbit's little children, also called Little Rabs in the early tales	Uncle Remus Initiates the Little Boy/ Miss Cow Falls a Victim to Mr. Rabbit/ The Awful Fate of Mr. Wolf/ A Story About the Little Rabbits/ How Brer Rabbit Frightened His Neighbors/ Brother Rabbit and His Famous Foot/ The Fire-Test/ Why Brother Wolf Did n't Eat the Little Rabbits/ Brother Rabbit Conquers Brother Lion/ Brer Rabbit and the Goobers/ Brer Rabbit's Frolic (sequel to The Creeturs Go to the Barbecue; here Br'er Rabbit falsely recalls the dance of Miss Rabbit and their mutual children's that morning, illustrations of the book show this scene)/ Brother Rabbit's Bear Hunt
Little Mr. Thimblefinger	man the size of a gnome who accompanies Buster John, Sweetest Susan and their nurse Drusilla to the magical world under the spring, where they will find the characters from Brother Rabbit stories, already aged	Little Mr. Thimblefinger and His Queer Country novel (in the frame-story)/ Mr. Rabbit at Home novel (in the frame-story)
Buster John	little boy living in a Middle Georgia plantation, with his sister Sweetest Susan and their nurse Drusilla they all go to the magical world under the spring, where they will find the characters from Brer Rabbit stories, already aged; his surname is Abercrombie	Little Mr. Thimblefinger and His Queer Country novel (in the frame-story)/ Mr. Rabbit at Home novel (in the frame-story) / The Story of Aaron (So Named) the Son of Ben Ali novel/ Plantation Pageants novel (in the frame-story)/ Wally Wanderoon and His Story-Telling Machine novel (in the frame-story)
Sweetest Susan	little girl living in a Middle Georgia plantation, with his brother Sweetest Susan and their nurse Drusilla they all go to the magical world under the spring, where they will find the characters from Brer Rabbit stories, already aged; her surname is Abercrombie	Little Mr. Thimblefinger and His Queer Country novel (in the frame-story)/ Mr. Rabbit at Home novel (in the frame-story)/ The Story of Aaron (So Named) the Son of Ben Ali novel/ Plantation Pageants novel (in the frame-story)/ Wally Wanderoon and His Story-Telling Machine novel (in the frame-story)
Drusilla	black girl, skeptical and fearful, nurse to Buster John and Sweetest Susan, they all go to the magical world under the spring, where they will find the characters from Brother Rabbit stories, already aged; her mother is Jemimy	Little Mr. Thimblefinger and His Queer Country novel (in the frame-story)/ Mr. Rabbit at Home novel (in the frame-story)/ The Story of Aaron (So Named) the Son of Ben Ali novel/ Plantation Pageants novel/ Wally Wanderoon and His Story-Telling Machine novel
Aaron	relatively young Arab slave, reserved and feared and with no Geechee dialect, who magically understands all the languages and knows that of the animals, too; he also hears the voices of the dead; an aged Br'er Rabbit - at the end of Little Mr. Thimblefinger and His Queer Country and of Mr. Rabbit at Home - is the one who directs the kids towards him	The Story of Aaron (So Named) the Son of Ben Ali novel/ Aaron in the Wildwoods novel (in the frame-story)/ Plantation Pageants novel (in the frame-story)
Aunt Minervy Ann	Minervy Ann Perdue, black woman who returns to Abercrombie plantation when slavery has been abolished, and tells various tales to Buster John and Sweetest Susan	Plantation Pageants novel (in the frame-story)
Chickamy Crany Crow and Tickle-My-Toes	middle-aged woman and man acting like children and living in the Queer Country	Little Mr. Thimblefinger and His Queer Country novel (in the frame-story)/ The Witch of the Well (only Chickamy Crany Crow in a story of her youth)/ Mr. Rabbit at Home novel (in the frame-story)
Little Mr. Thimblefinger's mother	woman who accepts the gift of a magical pumpkin tree with which to feed her large family, but a newborn appears in her house who is a sorcerer in disguise; in the dialect version no relationship with Mr. Thimblefinger is mentioned, which confirms it as a literary device to combine the tale with the frame-story in Little Mr. Thimblefinger	The Pumpkin-Eater (plain English version of The Baby and the Punkins)/ The Baby and the Punkins (dialect version of The Pumpkin-Eater)
Tip-Top	boy with a fake magic saddle with which he captures several thieves	The Talking-Saddle/ The Talking-Saddle and the Thief
Eolen	girl guided by a magical old man to visit Thunder's house and the Well at the End of the World, once she grows up will use a vial containing water from that Well profitably	Where the Thunder Lives/ The Jumping-Off Place/ The Magic Ring/ The Cow with the Golden Horns
Granny Rabbit	Brer Rabbit's grandmother, who lives in a tree to escape Brer Wolf	Cutta Cord-La!/ The Diamond Mine (as Mammy-Bammy-Big-Money)
Mrs. Blue Hen	bad-tempered hen	The Blue Hen's Chicken
Mrs. Blue Hen's chicken	duckling that hatches from a foreign egg in Mrs. Blue Hen's nest	The Blue Hen's Chicken
Mrs. Puddle Duck, also referred to as Widdle-Waddle Puddle Duck	duck soiling Mrs. Blue Hen's eggs and adding her own one to her nest, later it is among the pullets just killed by Br'er Fox after it had lived in those surroundings for years	The Blue Hen's Chicken/ Brother Rabbit, Brother Fox, and Two Fat Pullets (in part a sequel to Mr. Man Has Some Meat)
Old Speckled Hen	she points out Mrs. Blue Hen's tenth child as a monster, but he's actually a duckling	The Blue Hen's Chicken
Telambus	young man who becomes king after eating the head of a rooster, despite his stepfather's hostility	How a King Was Found
Brother Lion's mother	mother to Mr. Lion, severe against her quarrelsome son	The Ladder of Lions (sequel to Mr. Lion Hunts for Mr. Man)
Brer Gibley Gobbler	works with Brer Rabbit to save him from the Wildcat	Brother Rabbit and Mr. Wildcat
Granny Wolf	grandmother of Brer Wolf, boiled alive by Brer Rabbit and fed by him to Brer Wolf	Old Grinny Granny Wolf
Wattle Weasel	steals butter from the other creatures until captured by Brer Rabbit	How Wattle Weasel Was Caught
Wally Wanderoon	little old man hundreds of years old, owner of a "story-telling machine" (actually a fat man living in a cupboard) that tells old-fashion tales, he doesn't tolerate his narrator's scientific approach to fairy tales	Wally Wanderoon and His Story-Telling Machine novel (in the frame-story)/ The Red Flannel Night-cap (as a young boy)
Story-Telling Machine	actually a fat man living in a cupboard, he's an old-fashion story-teller who, however, is always inclined to indulge in modern methods of explaining everything about a fairy tale and its origins	Wally Wanderoon and His Story-Telling Machine novel (in the frame-story)
Brer Mink, also known as Mr. Mink	loses his fish to Brer Tarrypin when he is outwitted	Uncle Remus Initiates the Little Boy/ Old Brother Terrapin Gets Some Fish/ How Brer Rabbit Frightened His Neighbors/ Brother Rabbit Secures a Mansion (prose version of the later How Brer Rabbit Got a House)/ Brother Wolf Falls a Victim/ Mr. Rabbit as a Rain-Maker/ How Old Craney-Crow Lost His Head (new version of the [Untitled story] inside Aaron in the Wildwoods)
Miss Mink	Mr. Mink's wife	How Brer Rabbit Frightened His Neighbors
Witch-Wolf	attempts to get a man to marry her by transforming herself into a woman	Uncle Remus' Wonder Story
Jedge Rabbit	an old rabbit who helps a man escape a witch	Uncle Remus' Wonder Story
Mr. Bee	a bee stinging Brer Rabbit because he inadvertently mashed it	Brother Rabbit and the Bee
Simon	a young man who steals a woman away from her witch protector	The Adventures of Simon and Susanna
Three Wits	son of a hunter, frees his father from the curse of the Wild Hunt that the witch Peggy Pig-Eye (aka Paggia Paggiola) has forced him to endure	The Bewitched Huntsman/ The Three Ivory Bobbins
Valentine and Geraldine	a boy and a girl, who later grow up, who defeat the wizard Rimrak and then, in order to get married, must make sure that he becomes rich	"Keen-Point", "Cob-Handle" and "Butch"/ Mrs. Meadows Resumes Her Story/ A Story of the River
Jack of the Lantern	boy named Jack or John, he foils the plan of a witch-cow who transforms into a woman to marry her newly widowed father	The Little Boy of the Lantern
Sparkle Spry	child adopted by the baker with his wife, with the help of men the size of gnomes will in one night make all the bread needed by a regiment at war, then he accompanies them to defeat the enemy country inside a big wooden horse	The King of the Clingers/ The Terrible Horse
King of the Clinkers	old man, the size of a gnome, who commands a legion of men as big as himself, he helps Sparkle Spry make 2000 loaves for the army in one night and then commands a big wooden horse to end the war quickly and without bloodshed	The King of the Clingers/ The Terrible Horse
Mrs. Man	welcomes the wagging and cold Mr. Dog, definitively convincing Mr. Man not to chase him away in a bad way, decreeing the start of the domestication of dogs	Why Mr. Dog Is Tame
False conjurer at king's court	married man who, to ensure a future for his family, steals a horse from a prince and presents himself at court as a magician capable of finding the hidden horse, then finds himself forced to practice two more divinations and gets away with it even those times	A Lucky Conjurer
Rich and poor young man	unnamed young man who reaches the Island of the Mountain of Gold but can't enjoy it	A Mountain of Gold
Diddypawn	always-complaining, long-necked monster living in the mud who would like to be a fish or a bird	The Fate of the Diddypawn
Susanna	a woman who escapes her witch protector to marry the man she loves	The Adventures of Simon and Susanna
Miss Pa'tridge, also known as Miss Bob White	called Miss Bob White in a later story, actually the Northern Bobwhite is also known as Virginia quail or partridge; she saves her eggs from Br'er Rabbit by convincing him they're snake eggs, on another occasion Br'er Rabbit steals her eggs and since then she continues to recall the lost little ones	Mrs. Partridge Has a Fit/ Brer Rabbit and the Partridge Nest
Simmy-Sam	saves his mother from marrying a bull transformed into a human	Why Brother Bull Growls & Grumbles
Riley Rabbit	one of Brer Rabbit's heirs, saved from being eaten by his protector	How Wiley Wolf Rode in the Bag
Judge Wolf	judges Brer Rabbit for stealing Brer Fox's parched goobers	Brer Rabbit and the Goobers
Br'er Wolf's chilluns	Brer Wolf's little children	Brother Wolf Falls a Victim
Brer Deer	a besotted deer helped by Brer Rabbit and Spring Lizzard to achieve his prize	Brother Deer an' King Sun's Daughter
Spring Lizzard	helps Brer Deer to achieve his prize	Brother Deer an' King Sun's Daughter
King Sun, also referred to as de Sun	he visits the earth and burns several living beings (the black people, the fox in its paws) for upsetting him, then gives his daughter in marriage for a bag of gold	The Sun Takes a Holiday (as a young boy)/ Brother Deer an' King Sun's Daughter/ Ol' Joshway an' de Sun/ Uncle Remus Addresses Brother Wind
King Sun's daughter	girl who descends to earth to draw water for King Sun, she will marry Brer Deer for a bag of gold	Brother Deer an' King Sun's Daughter
Nancy	an heiress of Mister Man who is driven off after Brer Rabbit's trickery	Brother Rabbit and Miss Nancy
the Doodang	a strange creature resembling a mix of an alligator, rhinoceros, and elephant	The Story of the Doodang (new version of The Fate of the Diddypawn)
King-Bird	ruler of the birds	The Story of the Doodang (new version of The Fate of the Diddypawn)
Teenchy-Tiny (Puddle) Duck	a duck who recovers a bag of money with the help of several magical friends	The Story of Teenchy-Tiny Duck
Miss Coo-Coo Bird	a retiring bird who is convinced to join a beauty contest, some called it Coogly Bird and some called it Cow-Cow Bird	The Most Beautiful Bird in the World
Miss Robin	discussing with the other birds, she leads to the idea of a beauty contest	The Most Beautiful Bird in the World
Miss Blue Bird	discussing with the other birds, she leads to the idea of a beauty contest	The Most Beautiful Bird in the World
Miss Peafowl	she participates in the beauty contest of all the lady birds	The Most Beautiful Bird in the World
Ol' Miss Ost'ich	she knows she has no chance in the beauty contest of all the lady birds and lends a bunch of feathers to Miss Coo-Coo Bird	The Most Beautiful Bird in the World
Mr. Crow	he starts a singing competition with Brer Buzzard and uses his family relations to win a bet against him	The Story of the Owl/ A Singing-Match (plain English version of Mr. Crow and Brother Buzzard)/ Mr. Crow and Brother Buzzard (dialect version of A Singing-Match)
Miss Crow	she provides dinner for Mr. Crow while he is engaged in a non-stop singing contest with Mr. Buzzard	A Singing-Match (plain English version of Mr. Crow and Brother Buzzard)/ Mr. Crow and Brother Buzzard (dialect version of A Singing-Match)
Aunt Nancy	Brer Rabbit's great-grandmother and granny of Mammy-Bammy Big-Money, a half-spider sorceress based on Anansi	Brother Rabbit Doesn't Go to See Aunt Nancy
Mr. Beaver	boss of all the animals because he is smart, he has an overcoat admired by everyone and envied by Brer Rabbit	[Brer Rabbit an' de Overcoat]
Bélédie	Brother Goat's daughter in the French version of Tar-Baby	A French Tar-Baby
Joe Maxwell	literary alter-ego of Joel Chandler Harris, is a shy and sensitive boy from Hillsborough who goes to live at the Turner plantation at the beginning of the Civil War, his initiation starts from J. A. Turner's The Countryman journal at Eatonton	On the Plantation novel (in the frame-story)
Harbert	literary alter-ego of the real Harbert, is a Negro man-of-all-work at J. A. Turner's plantation near Eatonton and knows Uncle Remus from whom he learned some tales that he will tell to Joe Maxwell	On the Plantation novel (in the frame-story)
Johnny Chambliss	recently orphaned boy who comes across a magical acorn inhabited by the tiny Ningapie, who will help him against his witch stepmother	Mr. Wall's Story
Ningapie	tiny magical man who lives in an acorn, helps Johnny Chambliss defeat his witch stepmother	Mr. Wall's Story
Mr. Miles Wall	hat-shopper, illiterate and very superstitious but always ready for an argument on politics and religion, he tells the story of Johnny Chambliss and the tiny Ningapie	On the Plantation novel (in the frame-story)
Mr. Jaybird	at the time when all the birds lived in one settlement, he scolds Mr. Owl for falling asleep while watching the food	The Story of the Owl
Miss Chicken Hawk	at the time when all the birds lived in one settlement	The Story of the Owl
Mr. Eagle	at the time when all the birds lived in one settlement	The Story of the Owl
Miss Jenny Wren	at the time when all the birds lived in one settlement, she proves ingenious	The Story of the Owl/ The Most Beautiful Bird in the World
Miss Cat Bird	at the time when all the birds lived in one settlement	The Story of the Owl
Injun Bill	Negro from North Carolina, his father was a Cherokee Indian, he's friend of Mink and has a bad reputation; he tells How Wuz de Mountains Made and Brer Rabbit an' de Overcoat, earning Mink's remark that the Injun Brer Rabbit is weaker than the Negro one	On the Plantation novel (in the frame-story)
John Pruitt and Jim Wimberly	ex-soldiers who stop at the cabin where Joe Maxwell, Mink and Injun Bill have already taken refuge, they have deserted because their families do not have a good life at home; Pruitt tells the ingenious way with which - according to him - foxes get rid of fleas, Wimberly tells the story of "Ole Man Know-all"	On the Plantation novel (in the frame-story)
Sheep family	Mother sheep advises her children to be careful while grazing on grass, and they always come to her to ask her if the animal they just saw is a danger or not	[Untitled story] inside On the Plantation
De big Injun	he lives with the other Indians underground, safe from the great big flood, but he wants to return to the world above and asks Mr. and Mrs. Vulture if they can help him find the hole in the ground from which the smoke comes out.	[How Wuz de Mountains Made]
De Buzzud an' his ole 'oman	ancient buzzards living with the Indians underground, safe from the great big flood, but they want to return to the world above and create mountains and hills by repeatedly banging their heads against the rock roof	[How Wuz de Mountains Made]
"Ole Man Know-all"	man who prepares to die because he thinks he already knows everything about the world, but a Negro little boy will teach him that there is still so much to learn	[Ole Man Know-all]
John the Simpleton	idle man in an industrious city who makes himself a righter of wrongs against the defenseless, finally he foils the Mayor's robberies against his own citizens	John the Simpleton
Lizette	very poor but very beautiful girl tested and awarded by the Little People, she is chased by a wicked fairy	The Tale of the Crystal Bell
Miss Liza	shoemaker's daughter in the shop where the King goes to learn the trade	Miss Liza an' de King
Bobby (de) Raw	name of the King who goes to learn the trade in the shoemaker's shop	Miss Liza an' de King
Larro	handsome and smart son of a peasant and godson of a good fairy, his name means "The Lucky One"	The Mouse Princess
Larroline	fairy godmother of Larro the peasant	The Mouse Princess
Princess Geraldine	beautiful princess transformed into a mouse	The Mouse Princess
Mouse Mother	magical mouse breeder in a hut, with a youthful appearance	The Mouse Princess
Mack	boy from a poor and large family, leaves in search of a job to earn a living and he will do the hard work of cleaning up the King's court	The Boy and the King
Adam and Eve	they eat the forbidden fruit from the Apple-Tree and lose their place in the Garden	The Appile-Tree
The Hard-Headed Woman	a cantankerous woman, her husband gets rid of her by animating the pot with magic	The Hard-Headed Woman (rhyming version of the later The Hard-Headed Woman from Told by Uncle Remus)/ The Hard-Headed Woman (prose version of The Hard-Headed Woman from The Tar-Baby and Other Rhymes of Uncle Remus)
Tippity-Toe and Flee-ter-my-Knee	sort of magical and mischievous little people born in a well, they are cause of the inconveniences and scares at night	Two Tales in One—One Tale in Two
Mr. Yaller-Jacket	disturbed by Br'er Fox in the Gigglin'-Place set up by Br'er Rabbit	Brer Rabbit's Gigglin'-Place (rhyming version of the later Brother Rabbit's Laughing-Place)
Mr. Whipperwill	living in the swamp, his song is a call to Br'er Rabbit	Mr. Rabbit Run Fur— Mr. Rabbit Run Fas'/ How Old Craney-Crow Lost His Head (new version of the [Untitled story] inside Aaron in the Wildwoods)
Miss Whipperwill	she insistently cries on a farther hill	Brer Rabbit and the Partridge Nest
Miss Squinch Owl	she claims he can laugh louder than anyone	Brother Rabbit's Laughing-Place (prose version of Brer Rabbit's Gigglin'-Place)
The Rainmaker	he agrees to Br'er Rabbit's request who would like to organize a race	Brer Rabbit Treats the Creeturs to a Race
Uncle Win', also called Brer Wind	wind personified, who shows up with Cousin Rain to ruin an animal race	Brer Rabbit Treats the Creeturs to a Race/ Uncle Remus Addresses Brother Wind
Brer Dust	dust personified, who shows up to ruin an animal race	Brer Rabbit Treats the Creeturs to a Race
Brer Coon's daughter	heiress of Br'er Coon, created mostly in favor of rhyme in stories told in poetry	Brer Rabbit Gets Brer Fox a Hoss (rhyming version of Brother Fox Catches Mr. Horse)/ How Brer Rabbit Got a House (rhyming version of Brother Rabbit Secures a Mansion)
Miss Molly Cottontail, also referred to as Miss Molly Har'	infrequent Br'er Rabbit's girlfriend and even wife, originally a friend of Miss Meadows at her house	How Mr. Rabbit Succeeded in Raising a Dust (prose version of the later How Brer Rabbit Raised the Dust)/ Brer Rabbit Finds the Moon in the Mill Pond (rhyiming version of The Moon in the Mill-Pond)
Miss Motts	Miss Meadows's friend	The Moon in the Mill-Pond (prose version of the later Brer Rabbit Finds the Moon in the Mill Pond)/ Brer Rabbit Finds the Moon in the Mill Pond (rhyiming version of The Moon in the Mill-Pond)
Ol' Joshway	land worker inviting King Sun to sit with him	Ol' Joshway an' de Sun
de ol' Oak	it confirms to stay where it grew up, in an Uncle Remus' song	Uncle Remus Sings a Song
ol' Rhynossyhoss	he pops up on the West Road in an Uncle Remus' song	Uncle Remus Sings a Song
de Toad	he pops up on the West Road in an Uncle Remus' song	Uncle Remus Sings a Song
a Rooster	he crows at the opening of an Uncle Remus' song	Uncle Remus Sings a Song
Sue and Sal	some of the girls at Miss Meadow's house	How Mr. Rabbit Succeeded in Raising a Dust (still unnamed here; prose version of the later How Brer Rabbit Raised the Dust)/ How Brer Rabbit Raised the Dust (rhyming version of How Mr. Rabbit Succeeded in Raising a Dust)
Uncle Ladder	humanized ladder, Teenchy-Tiny Duck meets him on her way to the money taken from the rich man and he slips into her satchel	The Story of Teenchy-Tiny Duck
Gran'pappy River	Teenchy-Tiny Duck meets him on her way to the money taken from the rich man and he slips into her satchel	The Story of Teenchy-Tiny Duck
Ol' man Drone	Teenchy-Tiny Duck meets him on her way to the money taken from the rich man and he slips into her satchel along with all the Bees	The Story of Teenchy-Tiny Duck
Billy Rickerson-Dickerson	man who Br'er Rabbit calls in support to play a trick on the blacksmith, Satan meets him when he has just died	Impty-Umpty and the Blacksmith (part sequel, part remake of Jacky-My-Lantern)
Ramboo, Bamboo, an' Lamboo	Mister Man's dogs, set against Br'er Rabbit	Taily-Po
Taily-Po	wild cat awakened from the dead by Mammy-Bammy Big-Money to avenge Br'er Rabbit for the insult suffered by Mister Man, in reality it is only the nickname with which the zombie cat - while singing - refers to his own tail, which Mister Man cut off during the varmint's first sortie into his house, at night	Taily-Po
Clary	nanny of the first little boy	Brother Rabbit's Barbecue - How Brother Bear Exposed Brother Rabbit at the Barbecue (a single story with one title for the introduction and one for the story itself)/ Brother Bear Learns to Comb His Head (sequel to Brother Rabbit's Barbecue - How Brother Bear Exposed Brother Rabbit at the Barbecue; dialect version of How Brother Bear's Hair Was Combed)
Marse Jeems	brother of Miss Sally and son of Ole Miss, he lives in another plantation	A Story of the War
Ole Miss	mother of Miss Sally and Marse Jeems	A Story of the War

== Books ==
Uncle Remus books

- Uncle Remus, His Songs and His Sayings: The Folk-Lore of the Old Plantation with illustrations by Arthur Burdette Frost, 1881
- Nights with Uncle Remus: Myths and Legends of the Old Plantation with illustrations by Frederick Stuart Church and William Holbrook Beard, 1883
- Daddy Jake the Runaway and Short Stories Told After Dark with illustrations by Edward Windsor Kemble, 1889
- Uncle Remus and His Friends: Old Plantation Stories, Songs, and Ballads with Sketches of Negro Character with illustrations by Arthur Burdette Frost, 1892
- Told by Uncle Remus: New Stories of the Old Plantation with illustrations by Arthur Burdette Frost and J. M. Condé and line drawings after half-tones by Frank Ver Beck, 1905
- Uncle Remus and Brer Rabbit with illustrations by J. M. Condé, 1907. Reprint of some J. M. Condé's "Br'er Rabbit" comic strips from the McClure Newspaper Syndicate. It is not specified whether the author was J. C. Harris himself.
- Uncle Remus and the Little Boy with illustrations by J. M. Condé, 1910
- Uncle Remus Returns with illustrations by Arthur Burdette Frost and J. M. Condé, 1918
- Seven Tales of Uncle Remus, 1948

Miscellaneous books

- On the Plantation: A Story of a Georgia Boy's Adventures During the War, 1892. Fictional autobiography of Harris' youthful days, with plantation tales narrated by the people he met.
- Evening Tales: Done into English from the French of Frédéric Ortoli by Joel Chandler Harris, 1893. Translation of a selection of French tales, Brer Rabbit is in the Tar-Baby one.
- Little Mr. Thimblefinger and His Queer Country: What the Children Saw and Heard There with illustrations by Oliver Herford, 1894. This book and its sequels on the Abercrombie family of plantation owners are often omitted from Brer Rabbit chronologies but contain new stories of the character and his entourage, some of which will later be rewritten in dialect. Harris created two books separated from Uncle Remus storyline because he wasn't "sure they were negro stories; some are Middle Georgia folklore stories, and no doubt belong to England; and some are merely inventions.")
- Mr. Rabbit at Home: A Sequel to Little Mr. Thimblefinger and His Queer Country with illustrations by Oliver Herford, 1895. Second book on the Abercrombie family, the last with an older Brer Rabbit in the frame-story.
- The Story of Aaron (So Named) the Son of Ben Ali: Told by His Friends and Acquaintances with illustrations by Oliver Herford, 1896. Third book on the Abercrombie family. No tales narrated within.
- Aaron in the Wildwoods with illustrations by Oliver Herford, 1897. Fourth book on the Abercrombie family. One short story narrated within.
- Plantation Pageants with illustrations by E. Boyd Smith, 1899. Fifth book on the Abercrombie family, and spin-off of "The Chronicles of Aunt Minervy Ann", 1899.
- Wally Wanderoon and His Story-Telling Machine with illustrations by Karl Moseley, 1903. Sixth book on the Abercrombie family.
- The Tar-Baby and Other Rhymes of Uncle Remus with illustrations in color (old and new) by Arthur Burdette Frost and Edward Windsor Kemble, 1904. Rhyming versions of tales already published as well as tales that had not yet been published in prose. Harris thinks the rhyming versions are older.
