= The Officers' Quarterly =

The Officers' Quarters is a biannual publication of the Fredericton Region Museum. It began publication in 1985 as The Officers' Quarterly, a newsletter published four times a year. Through the years the magazine grew in size, complexity and cost. In 1999 it was reconstituted as The Officers' Quarters and is published twice a year.

The magazine publishes articles exploring the history and heritage of central New Brunswick, many written by members of the York Sunbury Historical Society, which operates the Fredericton Region Museum. It also provides news of the museum's holdings, exhibits, and special events as well as the activities of the Society and its members.

The Officers' Quarters was created during Paul O’Connell's presidency of the York Sunbury Historical Society. Over 50 issues have been published. Contributors have included amateur and professional historians including local specialists in the history of New Brunswick and nationally recognized historians such as T. W. Acheson (past editor), Vincent Erickson (editor), Sheila Andrew, Marc Milner and Margaret Conrad
