= Fredericton Region Museum =

Non-profit museum in Canada

Coordinates: 45.962054°N 66.63941°W

- Musée de la region de Fredericton

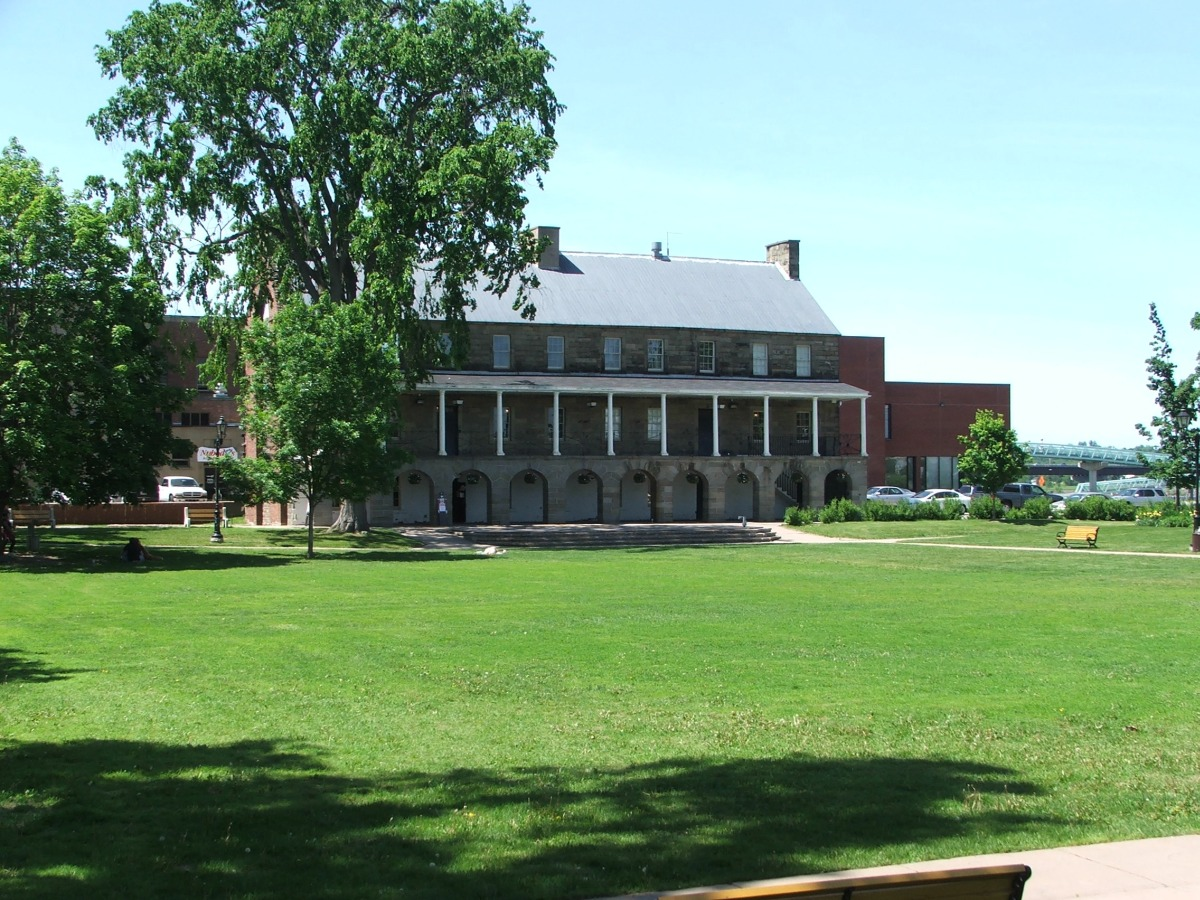
- The museum building in 2008, with Officers' Square in the foreground
- Former name: York Sunbury Museum
- Location: Fredericton, New Brunswick, Canada
- Type: History museum
- Website: www.frederictonregionmuseum.com

The Fredericton Region Museum, formerly known as the York Sunbury Museum, is a small, non-profit museum founded in 1934 by the York Sunbury Historical Society. The museum was housed in several locations until 1959, when it moved into Officers' Square on Queen Street in Fredericton, New Brunswick.

The Fredericton Region Museum focuses on preserving the history of the York and Sunbury region as well as central New Brunswick. The museum possesses a large and diverse collection of artefacts, displaying a 100-year-old cake, the Coleman Frog, Victorian gowns, and a 10,000-year-old Clovis Point. The museum contains more than ten exhibits, including displays on the Acadians, Loyalists, New Brunswick's Aboriginals, a First World War Trench, and more.

The museum relies on volunteers, as it is a non-profit institution with a small paid staff. The first full-time paid position as a curator was held by Bob Guthrie, beginning in 1969. Prior to this, the job of a manager was done on a volunteer basis, or as a part-time paid position.

== York Sunbury Historical Society ==
The idea of the York Sunbury Historical Society was sparked in January 1932 by Martha J. Harvey, at the height of the Great Depression, when a letter was sent out to the people of Fredericton suggesting a historical society be organized. The response was overwhelmingly positive. Within two weeks a society was formed, and by the end of 1932 there were 132 members.

The first meetings of the York Sunbury Historical Society were held on the second floor of the Post Office on Queen Street, and shortly after the society received the first of many donations of its historical artefacts.

The Society was incorporated on February 10, 1934. Its structure and purpose are set out in the bylaws accompanying that incorporation. Its purpose was to discover and preserve the history and heritage of York and Sunbury counties in New Brunswick (Canada). Its structure provided for a Board of Directors elected by the members at the annual meeting and for committees to deal with different aspects of the Society's mission. Today, the society still has some 150 members, each one committed to the original mission of the York Sunbury Historical Society. The York Sunbury Historical Society operates the museum in Officers' Square.

== See also ==
- The Officers' Quarterly
