= Coleman Frog =

Dubious large frog

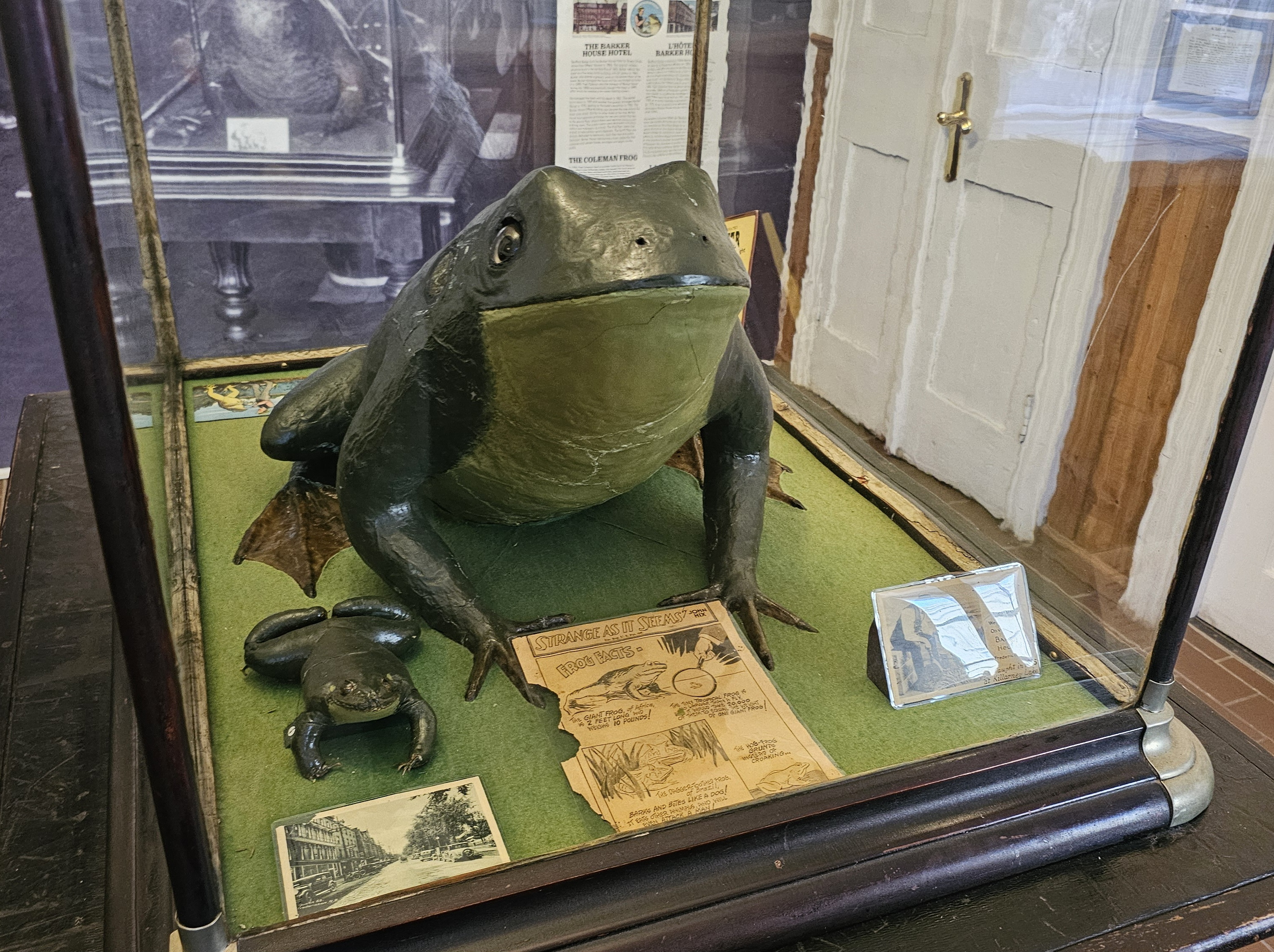
The frog on display at the Fredericton Region Museum in 2026

The Coleman Frog (also known as Cornelia Webster) is a supposed taxidermy specimen of a 19 kg (42 lb) frog, on display at the Fredericton Region Museum in Fredericton, New Brunswick, Canada, since 1959. It was previously owned by a man named Fred Coleman.

== Description ==
The frog was allegedly captured in 1889 from Lake Killarney, north of Fredericton, at which time it was said to have weighed 7 pounds 4 ounces (3.3 kg). Supposedly, the immense size of the frog was caused by the fact that Coleman fed it whiskey, baked beans, June bugs, buttermilk toddies, and whey. It is said to have died in a "dynamite accident" and was sent to Bangor, Maine, to be stuffed.

== Controversy ==
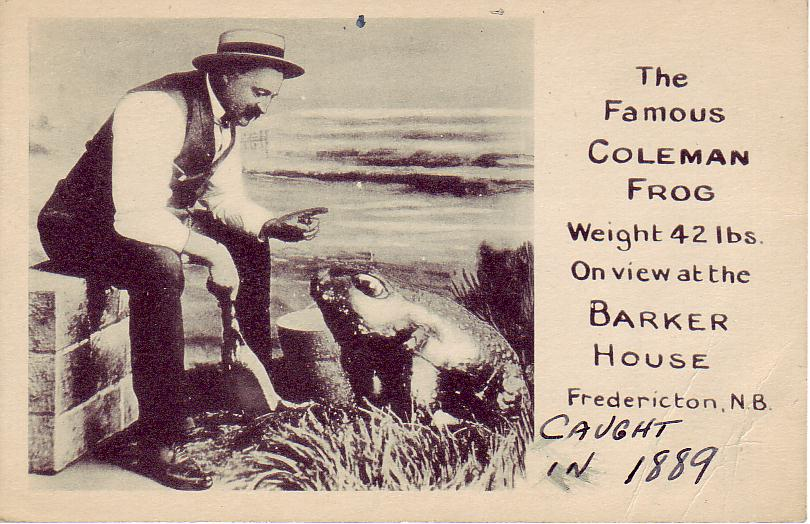
A postcard featuring Fred Coleman and the frog

Skeptics, such as the Museum of Hoaxes, say that the frog is a fake that was used to promote a cough syrup that would "relieve the frog in your throat". In a 1988 report, the Canadian Conservation Institute stated that the artifact consists of canvas, wax, and paint and in a letter it refers to the exhibit as “an amusing example of a colossal fake and deception”. The museum will not allow DNA testing to be performed on the frog to confirm whether it is real or a fake.

== See also ==
- Fur-bearing trout
