= Tar-Baby =

American Folklore character and metaphor

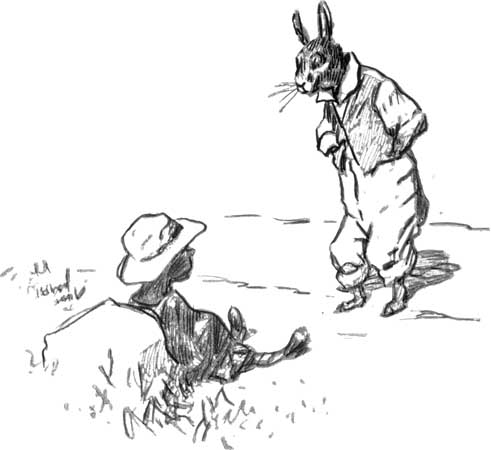
Br'er Rabbit and the Tar-Baby, drawing by E. W. Kemble from "The Tar-Baby", by Joel Chandler Harris, 1904

The Tar-Baby is the second of the Uncle Remus stories published in 1881; it is about a doll made of tar and turpentine used by the villainous Br'er Fox to entrap Br'er Rabbit. The more that Br'er Rabbit fights the Tar-Baby, the more entangled he becomes.

The phrase "tar baby" has acquired idiomatic meanings over the years, including a negative racial connotation.

== Publication history ==
Joel Chandler Harris collected the story in its original dialect and included it in his 1881 book, "Uncle Remus, his Songs and his Sayings". His introduction mentions earlier publication of some of his Uncle Remus Stories in the columns of a daily newspaper, The Atlanta Constitution. Harris said these legends had "become a part of the domestic history of every Southern family." Indeed, Theodore Roosevelt (the 26th president of the United States, born in 1858), noted in his autobiography that as a young child he heard Br'er Rabbit tales from his Southern aunt, Anna Bulloch, and that his uncle, Robert Roosevelt, transcribed some of her stories from her dictation.

== Plot ==
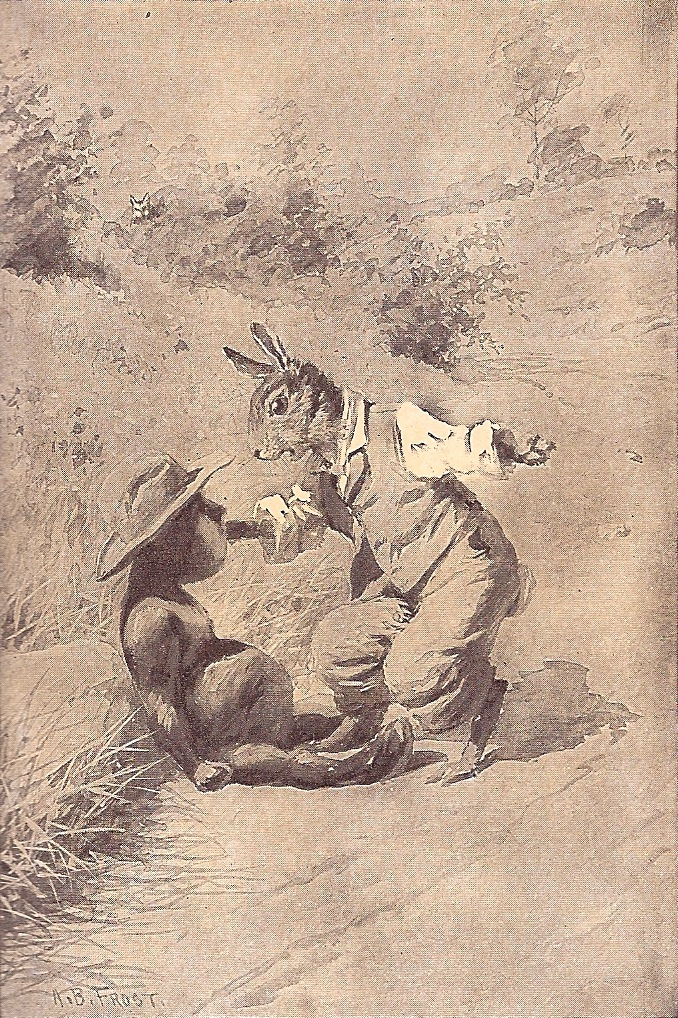
Br'er Rabbit attacking the Tar-Baby, 1895 illustration

The 'Tar Baby' story comes from the oral tradition of black slaves on the old plantations of the American South, one of many Uncle Remus stories. It features Br'er Fox, who constructs a doll out of a lump of pine tar and dresses it with some clothes. When Br'er Rabbit comes along he addresses the tar "baby" amiably but receives no response. Br'er Rabbit becomes offended by what he perceives as the tar baby's lack of manners, punches it and, in doing so, becomes stuck. The more Br'er Rabbit punches and kicks the tar baby out of rage, the worse he gets stuck.

In Joel Chandler Harris's popular retelling of the tar baby story, the fox then saunters over and gloats, laughing uproariously, and invites the rabbit to his house to "take dinner" with him, saying he has some calamus root and will take no excuse. The little boy listening to the story asks if the fox ate the rabbit, but the storyteller demurs and tells the boy to run off because he's being called. The Harris version seems to end there.

A couple of stories later, though, the tale continues in Harris's story, "How Mr. Rabbit was Too Sharp for Mr. Fox". This ending is now popularly incorporated into the tar baby story:

Now that Br'er Rabbit is stuck, Br'er Fox ponders how to dispose of him. The helpless but cunning Br'er Rabbit pleads, "Do anything you want with me – roas' me, hang me, skin me, drown me – but please, Br'er Fox, don't fling me in dat brier-patch", prompting the sadistic Br'er Fox to do exactly that because he gullibly believes it will inflict the maximum pain on Br'er Rabbit. However, as rabbits are at home in thickets like the brier-patch, the resourceful Br'er Rabbit escapes.

== Analysis ==
In folklore studies, the story of the Tar-Baby is classified in the international Aarne-Thompson-Uther Index as tale type ATU 175, "The Tar-Baby and the Rabbit".

== Related stories ==
Variations on the tar-baby legend are found in the folklore of more than one culture. In the Journal of American Folklore in 1943, Aurelio M. Espinosa discussed various different motifs within 267 versions of the tar-baby story that were ostensibly 'in his possession'. Espinosa used the existence of similar motifs to argue that the tar baby story and hundreds of other myths throughout the world, despite the significant variations between them, originate from a single ancient Indian myth. The next year, Archer Taylor added a list of tar baby stories from more sources around the world, citing scholarly claims of its earliest origins in India and Iran. Espinosa later published documentation on tar baby stories from a variety of language communities around the world.

Anthropologist Elsie Clews Parsons compiled an extensive list of references of the Tar Baby stories, from North American, Latin American and African publications on folklore.

A very similar West African tale is told of the mythical hero Anansi the Spider. In this version, Anansi creates a wooden doll and covers it over with gum, then puts a plate of yams in its lap, in order to capture the she-fairy Mmoatia (sometimes described as an "elf" or "dwarf"). Mmoatia takes the bait and eats the yams, but grows angry when the doll does not respond and strikes it, becoming stuck in the process.

From The Bahamas, the tar-baby story was published by The Journal of American Folklore in 1891 in Some Tales from Bahama Folk-Lore by Charles Lincoln Edwards. Edwards had collected the stories from Green Turtle Cay, Abaco in the summer of 1888. In the tale, B' Rabby refused to dig for water, and didn't help grow the field. He tricked B' Lizard and B' Bouki while they were standing watch by the water and the field. The other animals got tired of his tricks, got together and created a tar-baby. B' Rabby was caught by the tar-baby and the other animals who wanted to throw him into the sea, but he talked them into throwing him into a bush, and eventually got away.

In a variant recorded in Jamaica, Anansi himself was once similarly trapped with a tar-baby made by the eldest son of Mrs. Anansi, after Anansi pretended to be dead in order to steal her peas. In a Spanish language version told in the mountainous parts of Colombia, an unnamed rabbit is trapped by the Muñeco de Brea (tar doll). Joseph Campbell identifies a Buddhist myth, that of Prince Five-weapons (the future Buddha) encountering the ogre Sticky-Hair in a forest, as one of the earliest known tar-baby stories.

The tar-baby theme is present in the folklore of various tribes of Meso-America and of South America: it is found in such stories as the Nahuatl (of Mexico) "Lazy Boy and Little Rabbit" (González Casanova 1946, pp. 55–67), Pipil (of El Salvador) "Rabbit and Little Fox" (Schultes 1977, pp. 113–116), and Palenquero (of Colombia) "Rabbit, Toad, and Tiger" (Patiño Rosselli 1983, pp. 224–229). In Mexico, the tar baby story is also found among Mixtec, Zapotec, Popoluca, Mazatec and Chinantec. In North America, the tale appears in White Mountain Apache lore as "Coyote Fights a Lump of Pitch". In this story, white men are said to have erected the pitch-man that ensnares Coyote.

According to James Mooney in "Myths of the Cherokee", the tar-baby story may have been influenced in America by the Cherokee "Tar Wolf" story, considered unlikely to have been derived from similar African stories: "Some of these animal stories are common to widely separated [Native American] tribes among whom there can be no suspicion of [African] influences. Thus the famous "tar baby" story has variants, not only among the Cherokee, but also in New Mexico, Washington [State], and southern Alaska—wherever, in fact, the pine supplies enough gum to be molded into a ball for [Native American] uses".

In the Tar Wolf story, the animals were thirsty during a dry spell, and agreed to dig a well. The lazy rabbit refused to help dig, and so had no right to drink from the well. But she was thirsty, and stole from the well at night. The other animals fashioned a wolf out of tar and placed it near the well to scare the thief. The rabbit was scared at first, but when the tar wolf did not respond to her questions, she struck it and was held fast. Then she struggled with it and became so ensnared that she could not move. The next morning, the animals discovered the rabbit and proposed various ways of killing her, such as cutting her head off, and the rabbit responded to each idea saying that it would not harm her. Then an animal suggested throwing the rabbit into the thicket to die. At this, the rabbit protested vigorously and pleaded for her life. The animals threw the rabbit into the thicket. The rabbit then gave a whoop and bounded away, calling out to the other animals "This is where I live!"

== Idiomatic references ==
The story has given rise to two American English idioms. References to Br'er Rabbit's feigned protestations such as "please don't fling me in dat brier-patch" refer to guilefully seeking something by pretending to protest, with a "briar patch" (a thicket of thorny plants) often meaning a more advantageous situation or environment for one of the parties (but not for the other party).

Alluding to Br'er Rabbit becoming entangled in the tar, the term tar baby has been used to refer to a problem that is exacerbated by attempts to struggle with it, or by extension to a situation in which mere contact can lead to becoming inextricably involved.

Pine tar, as meant in the original story and idiomatic usage, varies from golden to brown in color, with a golden color when thinned with turpentine. Bitumen/liquid asphalt has sometimes been called "tar" due to its replacement of pine tar in many uses. Because asphalt is dark brown to black, some who heard the term "tar baby" who were unfamiliar with the original story or established idiom assumed it was a term to disparagingly refer to black people, especially black children, and has become associated with racism in that usage. The term has been used as a racial slur against Black people, especially Black children. In many versions of the Uncle Remus story, the tar baby is compared to a Black person, whether by being illustrated with typically African features or described with phrases such as "a little Congo" or "as black as a Guinea Negro." Historically, "tar baby" has been used as marketing alongside blackface and pickaninny caricatures. Due to these racial connotations, politicians have faced pushback for using the term.

== See also ==
- Cautionary tale
- Reverse psychology
- Wicked problem
- Tar Baby - A novel by Toni Morrison
