= Legacy Entertainment =

Themed entertainment company

- Type: Private
- Industry: Theme park Entertainment; Experience design
- Founded: 2002; 24 years ago
- Headquarters: U.S.
- Area served: Worldwide
- Key people: Taylor Jeffs (Director - Creative) Barry Kemper (Director - Operations); Eric Carnagey (Director - Business) Marcus King (Director - Projects)
- Products: Theme Parks, Water Parks, Resorts, Attractions, Hotels, Casinos, Retail, Live Theatre, Live Entertainment, Aquariums, Animal Theme Parks, Oceanariums, Safari Parks, Family Entertainment Centers, Parades
- Website: www.legacyentertainment.com

Legacy Entertainment is an entertainment design firm and themed entertainment integrator based in Los Angeles, California. The company, then known as Gary Goddard Entertainment (GGE) and later the Goddard Group, was formed by Gary Goddard in 2002, after leaving his previous company, Landmark Entertainment Group. Goddard Group reorganized, changed ownership, and was rebranded Legacy Entertainment in 2018 when Gary Goddard left the company following accusations of sexual assault.

== Projects ==
Legacy Entertainment has created a number of entertainment projects in a variety of forms, including Theme Parks, Attractions, Water Parks, Icons, Aquariums and Oceanariums, Safari Parks and Animal Theme Parks, Resorts, Casinos, Shopping malls, and Live Entertainment, including Broadway Shows and Parades. The Company has designed and developed attractions for clients such as Cirque du Soleil, Universal Studios, Six Flags, Insomniac Events, Haichang Polar Ocean World, Lotte World, Galaxy Entertainment Group, and Melco Resorts & Entertainment.

=== Lotte World partnership ===
In 2012, the Company announced a partnership with South Korea's Lotte World theme park to create a number of new rides, shows, and attractions. Eight attractions opened as a result of this collaboration, including Jumping Fish, Do You Speak Beluga?, Underland, Brother Moon & Sister Sun's Tall Tales, The Welcome Center, Let's Dream! Nighttime Parade, Fairy Trails Dream Boats, and Wild Tours.

=== Cirque du Soleil partnership ===
In November 2014, Mexican resort developer Vidanta announced their intention to build and operate the world's first Cirque du Soleil theme park at its resort in Nuevo Vallarta, Mexico. The company is the project's designer.

In May 2015, it was revealed that the Company and Cirque du Soleil had signed a joint venture partnership agreement that would help expand Cirque into experiential entertainment.

== Completed projects list ==
| Client | Location | Attraction | Completion Date | Status | Source | Notes |
|---|---|---|---|---|---|---|
| Hershey's Chocolate World | New York City, New York United States | Times Square location | 2002 | operating | | Retail & Shopping design |
| Hershey's Chocolate World | Hershey, Pennsylvania (US) | Facility renewal | 2002 | operating | | Retail & Shopping design |
| Hershey's Chocolate World | Hershey, Pennsylvania (US) | Hershey's Really Big 3D Show | 2002 | closed in 2013 | | 3-D film design and production |
| Georgia Aquarium | Atlanta, Georgia (US) | | 2005 | operating | | Aquarium design |
| Georgia Aquarium | Atlanta, Georgia (US) | Deepo's Undersea 3D Wondershow | 2005 | closed in late 2015 | | 3-D film design and production |
| Hershey's Chocolate World | Hershey, Pennsylvania (US) | Hershey's Great American Factory Tour Ride | 2006 | | | Dark ride design and production |
| Grand Indonesia | Jakarta, Indonesia | Crossroads of the World | 2007 | Market District Demolished, 3/4 zones left, and the rest of the zone has been retrofitted | | Retail & Shopping design |
| Six Flags Mexico | Mexico City, Mexico | Glow in the Park Parade | 2008 | | | Parade design and production |
| Six Flags Great Adventure | Jackson, New Jersey (US) | Glow in the Park Parade | 2008 | | | Parade design and production |
| Six Flags New England | Agawam, Massachusetts (US) | Glow in the Park Parade | 2008 | | | Parade design and production |
| Six Flags Over Texas | Arlington, Texas (US) | Glow in the Park Parade | 2008 | | | Parade design and production |
| Six Flags St. Louis | St. Louis, Missouri (US) | Glow in the Park Parade | 2008 | | | Parade design and production |
| Six Flags Great America | Gurnee, Illinois (US) | Glow in the Park Parade | 2008 | | | Parade design and production |
| FX Sudirman | Jakarta, Indonesia | Atmosfear Slide | 2008 | closed | | Parade design and production |
| The Hershey Story | Hershey, Pennsylvania (US) | The Hershey Story Museum | 2009 | operating | | Museum design |
| Six Flags Over Georgia | Austell, Georgia (US) | Monster Mansion | 2009 | operating | | Dark ride design and production |
| Trans Studio | Makassar, South Sulawesi, Indonesia | Trans Studio Makassar | May 20, 2009 | operating | | Indoor Theme Park design |
| Chengdu International Intangible Cultural Heritage Park | Chengdu China | Chengdu Intangible Cultural Heritage Center | 2010 | | | Cultural Destination design |
| Galaxy Entertainment Group | Cotai Strip, Macau, China | Galaxy Macau | May 15, 2011 | operating | | Casino resort design |
| Lotte World | Seoul, South Korea | Jumping Fish ride | 2012 | operating | | Attraction design and integration |
| Fushun Economic Development Area Administration Committee | Fushun, China | Ring of Life & Shenfu New Town | 2012 | operating | | Icon design |
| Insomniac (promoter) | Las Vegas, Nevada (US) | Electric Daisy Carnival Kinetic Field Stage | 2013 | | | Music Festival Design and production |
| Lotte World | Seoul, South Korea | Do You Speak Beluga | 2013 | operating | | Attraction design and integration |
| Lotte World | Seoul, South Korea | Brother Moon & Sister Sun's Tall Tales ride | 2013 | operating | | Attraction design and integration |
| Lotte World | Seoul, South Korea | Underland themed zone | 2013 | operating | | Theme zone design and integration |
| Lotte World | Seoul, South Korea | Welcome Center | 2013 | operating | | Theme zone design and integration |
| Lotte World | Seoul, South Korea | Let's Dream! 25th Anniversary Nighttime Parade | 2014 | operating | | Parade design and production |
| Lotte World | Seoul, South Korea | Fairy Trails Dream Boats | 2014 | operating | | Attraction design and integration |
| Lotte World | Seoul, South Korea | Wild Tours Theme Zone | 2015 | operating | | Theme zone design and integration |
| Studio City (Macau) | Cotai Strip, Macau, China | Golden Reel figure-8 ferris wheel | October 27, 2015 | operating | | Casino resort design |
| The Encounter | New York City, New York (US) | Broadway production | September 29, 2016 | operating | | Producer, live theatre |
| KWZone | Harbin, China | Kingdom of Poseidon Water Park | 2017 | operating | | Water Park design |
| Haichang Polar Ocean World | Shanghai, China | Shanghai Haichang Polar Ocean World | November 16, 2018 | operating | | Theme Park design |
| Trans Studio | Cibubur, Indonesia | Trans Studio Cibubur | 2019 | operating | | Indoor Theme Park design |
| Trans Studio | Bali, Indonesia | Trans Studio Bali | 2019 | operating | | Indoor Theme Park design |
| Trans Studio | Cibubur, Indonesia | Pacific Rim:Shatterdome Strike Dark Ride | 2019 | operating | | Dark ride design and production |
| Trans Studio | Bali, Indonesia | Road Rage: Wasteland Escape Dark Ride | 2019 | operating | | Dark ride design and production |
| Hengdian World Studios | Hengdian, China | Dream Bund Theme Park | August 17, 2019 | operating | | Theme Park design |
| Lotte World | Busan, South Korea | Lotte World Adventure Theme Park | 2022 | operating | | Theme Park Design |
| Vingroup | Phu Quoc Island | The Sea Shell Aquarium at VinWonders Theme Park | 2022 | operating | | Aquarium Design |
| Agung Sedayu Group | Jakarta, Indonesia | Batavia PIK | 2023 | operating | | Retail, Dining & Entertainment Design |
| Chimelong | Zhuhai, China | Chimelong Spaceship | 2023 | operating | | Indoor Theme Park, Resort & Oceanarium Design |

== Awards and patents ==
In 2009, the Company was awarded Amusement Today's Golden Ticket Award. They are the first entertainment design firm to win this award.

The Company's projects have received a total of seven THEA awards.

Studio City (Macau), which was designed by Legacy Entertainment for Melco Resorts & Entertainment and opened on the Cotai Strip in 2015, received its third Forbes Travel Guide Five-Star Award in a row.

The Kingdom of Poseidon, a 150,000m2 integrated Water Park resort designed by Legacy Entertainment in Harbin, China, won the award for Best Indoor Theme Park.

Legacy Entertainment-designed Chimelong Spaceship Theme Park in Zhuhai, China has been awarded seven Guinness World Records.

Lava Drifting, the spinning rapids ride at Shanghai Haichang Polar Ocean Park is the longest spinning rapids ride in the world, as well as being the world's first spinning rapids ride with actual rapid rivers and was awarded an IAAPA Brass Ring Award in 2019.

Shanghai Haichang Polar Ocean Park has received a range of accolades, such as “Outstanding Themed Land Park”, “Outstanding Family Entertainment Center” and “Outstanding Social Media Famous Tourist Attraction” in the 2020 Golden Crown Awards. The project had previously been named “Best Theme Park” by the Chinese Association of Amusement Parks and Attractions (CAAPA), the largest industry representative of its type for the country.

Legacy Entertainment-designed Pacific Rim: Shatterdome Strike at Trans Studio Cibubur was awarded as one of the "Top 11 most important and influential dark rides of the past decade" by the leading attractions industry news source, Blooloop.
