= Ring of Life =

Landmark in Fushun, Liaoning, China

Coordinates: 41.820°N 123.683°E

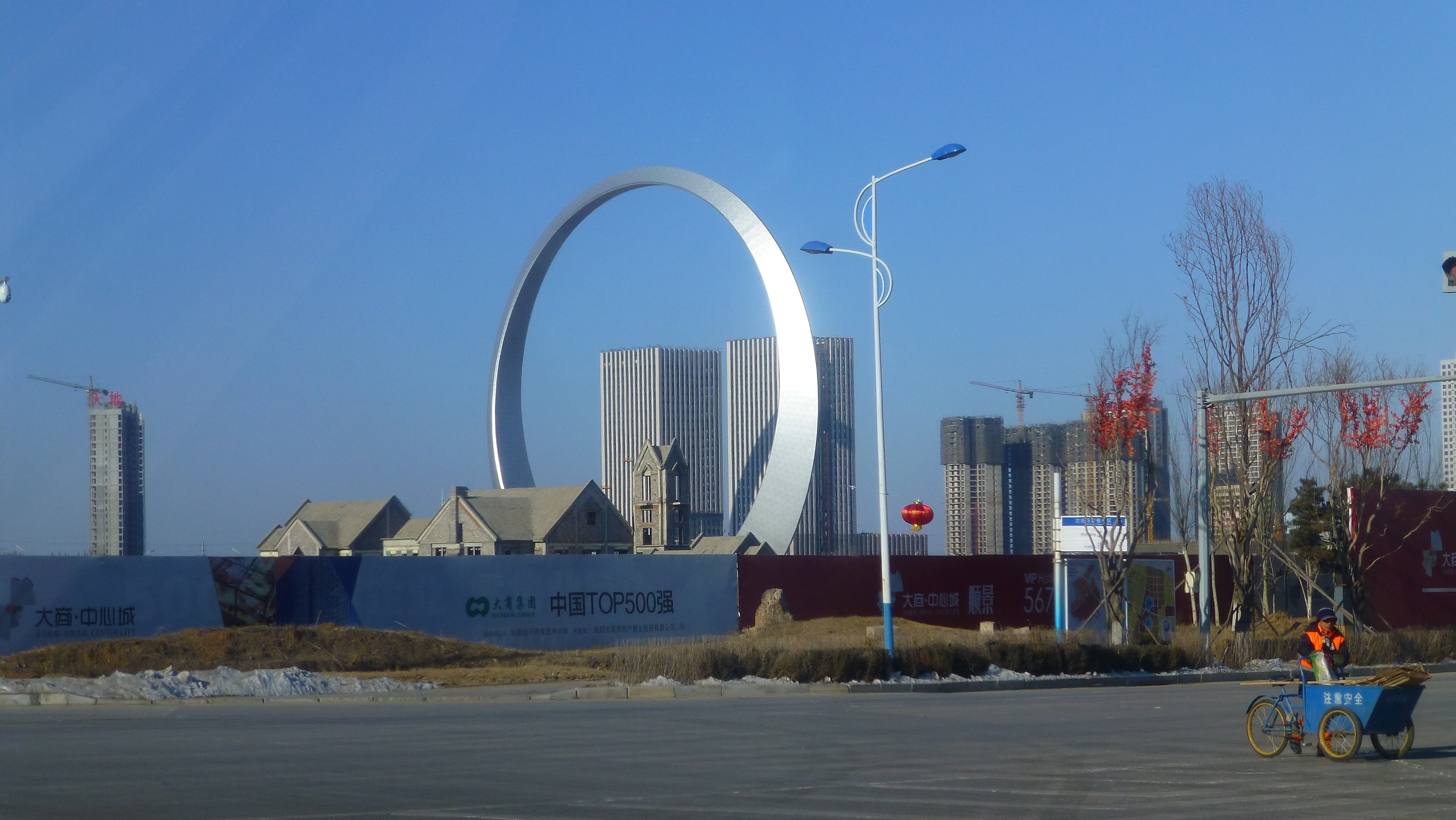
Ring of Life - Fushun, Liaoning - taken 30 January 2014.

The Ring of Life (simplified chinese: 生命之环; pinyin: shēngmìng zhī huán) is a 515-foot (157 m) landmark built in the city of Fushun, China.

The landmark is built with an observation deck accessible by elevator, as well as 12,000 LED lights. Having abandoned local entertainment projects due to the small local population, urban planners settled on building a sightseeing landmark instead in order to attract a tourist industry to the region. The structure uses approximately 3,000 tons of steel and cost an estimated $16M U.S. dollars.

== History ==
In May 2009, Entertainment Designer Gary Goddard (and his firm, the Goddard Group), was engaged by Fushun Economic Development Area Administration Committee to master plan 2 square kilometers of a new 22-square kilometer city being developed near Shenyang, China. Goddard had come to their attention while working on the nearby Dream World theme park in Fushun, China.

Goddard and his team developed many concepts and ideas for the new city, including shopping districts, recreation zones, and ultimately an iconic centerpiece, the Ring of Life.

Following the Concept Design phase, in January 2010 the Goddard Group was engaged to continue with the project, including the Schematic Design phase of the Ring of Life.

The Goddard Group design team included Igor Knezevic, Larry Nelson, Branislav Hetzel, Steve Trowbridge, Greg Pro, Sevak Petrosian, Taylor Jeffs, Nathaniel West and Ed Borrego. In addition, Foster Conant was engaged to provide Landscape Design, while Selbert Perkins created the signage and graphics for the overall city and ring itself.

While the Phase 1 of Shenfu New Town would not be complete until Spring of 2013, news of the ring spread around the world in November 2012 when construction photos surfaced. In its initial stages the building was used as a bungee jumping attraction, however this has since stopped and is now simply a sightseeing attraction. The structure has been likened to the Gateway Arch in St. Louis, Missouri.

== Reception ==
The Ring of Life has received a mixed-to-positive reaction in the media. The Huffington Post called it "stunning", and National Geographic listed a photo of the ring amongst their "Best of September (2012)".
