= Tourism in Chengdu =

Tourism industry in Chengdu, China

Tourism in Chengdu focuses on Chengdu's status as a major city located in southwestern China and being the capital of Sichuan Province. It serves as a major economical and transportation hub in the region. As of 2020, Chengdu has a population of approximately 21 million people. Many of its tourist attractions revolve around its history, culture, and cuisine.

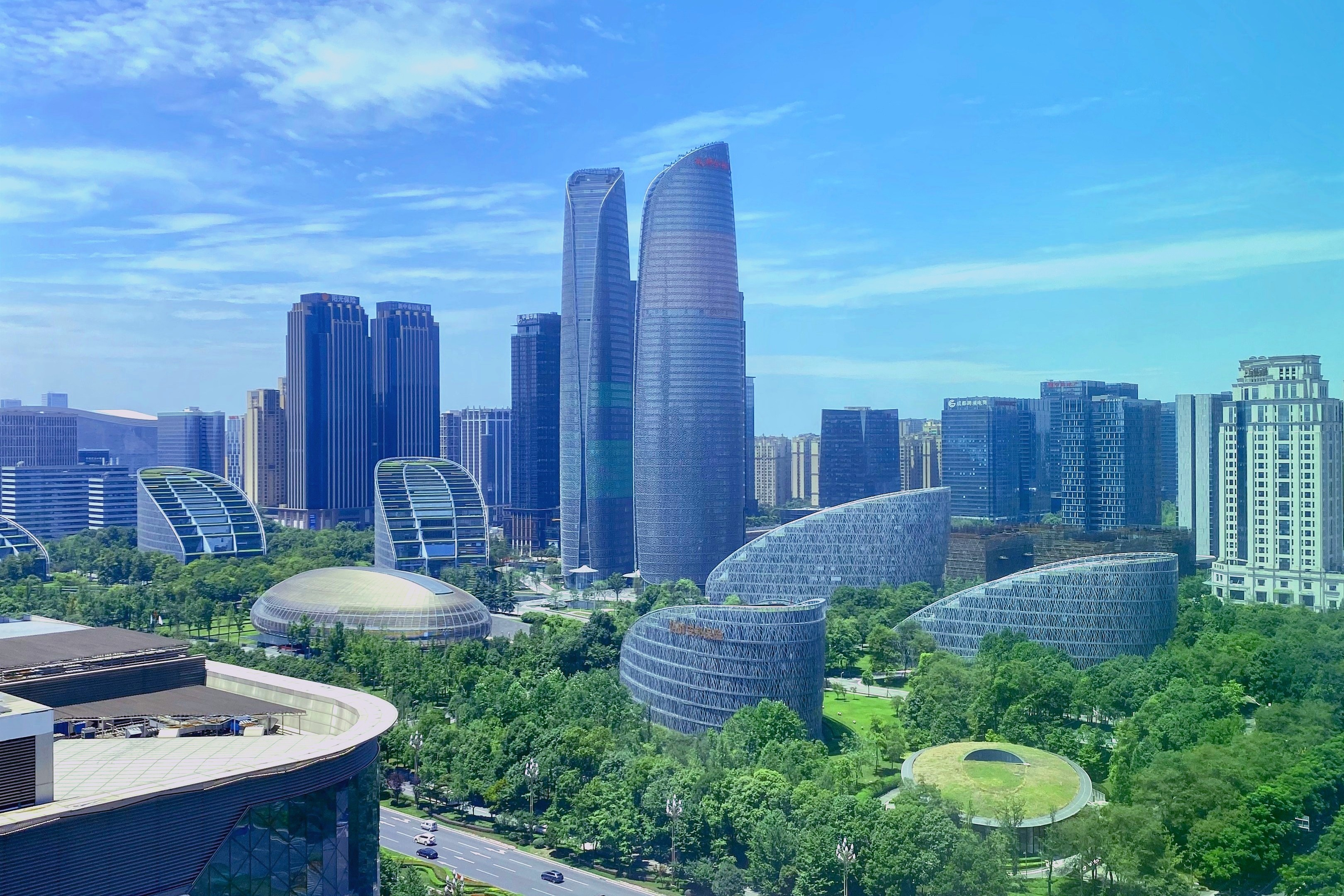
Tianfu Financial Center Skyline

== Overview ==
Chengdu is a popular destination within China and receives approximately 200 million domestic visitors annually. Visitor numbers are increasing due to rapid economic growth. Domestically, Chengdu is connected by high-speed rail, namely the Xi'an–Chengdu high-speed railway. There is also a high speed railway connecting Chengdu to Chongqing. By air, Chengdu is served by two airports: Chengdu Shuangliu International Airport and Chengdu Tianfu International Airport. Chengdu Shuangliu International Airport is located approximately 18 km from the city's downtown and in 2019, was the fourth busiest airport in mainland China. Opened in 2021, Chengdu Tianfu International Airport is approximately 65 km southeast to the city center and now handles most of the international flights to Chengdu.

One of the major draws to Chengdu is its cuisine and it is listed as a UNESCO City of Gastronomy. Chengdu is often described as the heart of Sichuan cuisine. Notable dishes include mapo tofu, dandan noodles, and Kung Pao chicken. As of 2026, eleven restaurants in Chengdu possess one Michelin star, while two possess two. Chengdu is also known for its Sichuan hot pot scene.

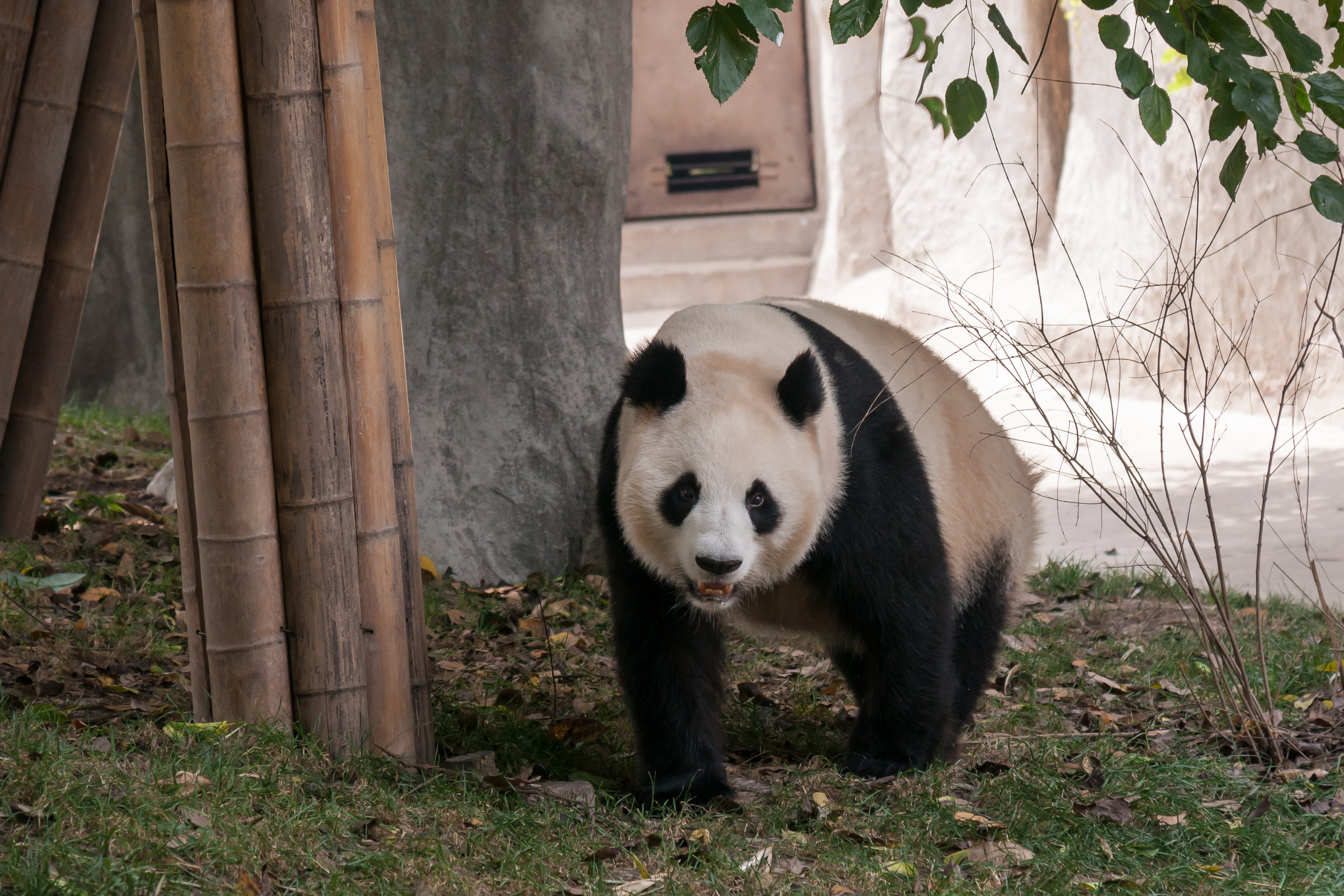
Giant panda at Chengdu Research Base of Giant Panda Breeding

Giant pandas are native to Sichuan province and another major tourist draw for the city. The Chengdu Research Base of Giant Panda Breeding is the world's largest giant panda research base and is home to more than 150 giant pandas. In addition to giant pandas, the facility also houses and provides care for other endangered species such as red pandas and black-necked crane. The research base receives more than 20 million visitors annually.

Another draw for Chengdu is its local culture. Teahouses are a crucial part of the local culture and they are abundant in the city. These teahouses offer services to business travelers such as meeting spaces, ear cleaning, massages, and fingernail cutting. They also provide food and drinks to clients. Chengdu is home to the oldest teahouse in China, the Guanyin Pavilion which has been operating for more than 300 years. Sichuan opera is another tourist draw in the city, with notable locations for live performances being Shufengyan Sichuan Opera House and Furongguocui Sichuan Opera House.

== Notable attractions ==
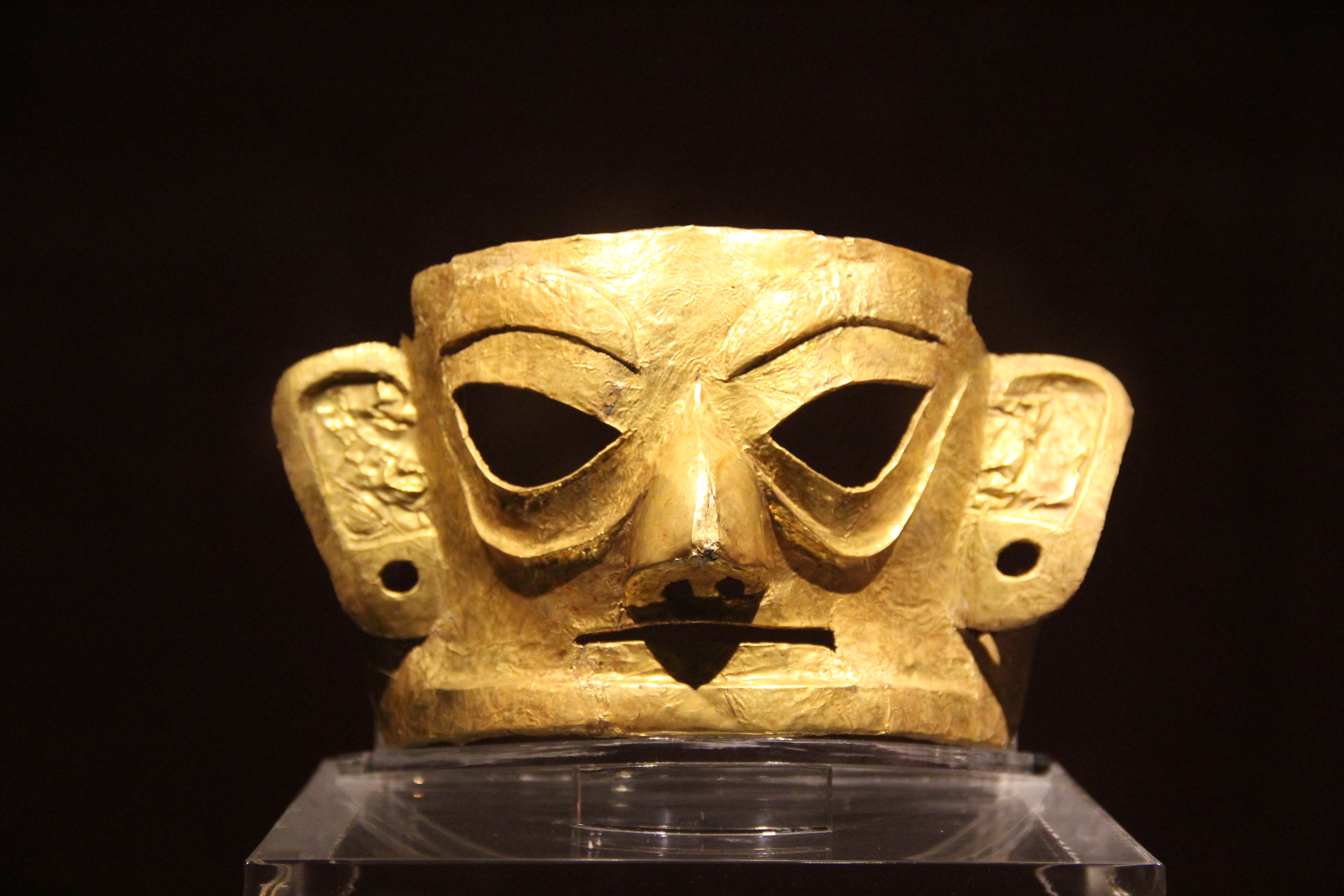
Gold Mask at Jinsha Site

Chengdu is home to a variety of attractions including 150 museums and two World Heritage Sites. With a recorded history of over 2300 years, Chengdu is the earliest settlement in what is now southwest China. Thus, Chengdu possesses a number of historical landmarks, including the following:

- Wenshu Temple: A Buddhist monastery that is over 1400 years old. It contains over 300 statues made of different materials such as bronze, clay, and stone.
- Du Fu Thatched Cottage: A former residence of the Tang Dynasty poet Du Fu, which was established in 759.
- Wuhou Temple: A temple dedicated to two key figures of the Three Kingdoms Period, Zhuge Liang and Liu Bei.
- Jinli: An ancient street that is called the First Street of the Shu Kingdom, dating to the Three Kingdoms Period.
- Qingyang Temple: A Taoist temple that dates back to the Zhou dynasty.
- Jinsha Site: A museum dedicated to an ancient Shu civilization and houses important artifacts such as the Gold Sun, Gold Mask, and Immortal Bird
- Dujiangyan: A 2000-year-old irrigation system that is still in use today. It is a UNESCO World Heritage Site.

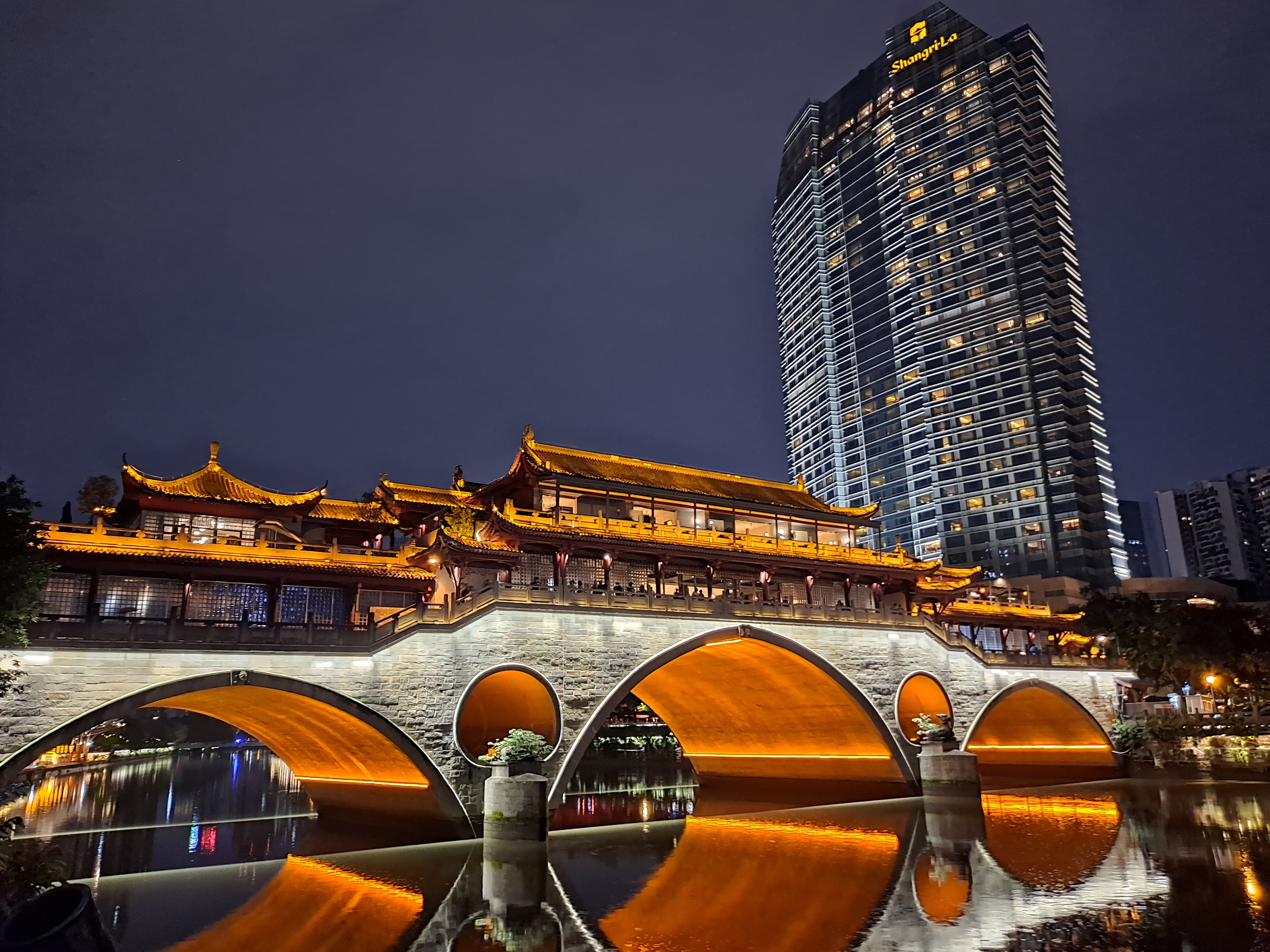
Anshun Bridge at night

Chengdu also has a number of modern attractions, including Anshun Bridge which is a modern 2003 reconstruction of an ancient bridge that dates back to the Yuan dynasty. The West Pearl Tower is the tallest tower in western China and has a height of 339 meters. People's Park is a large urban park located in downtown Chengdu and features an artificial lake and teahouses. Chunxi Road is a popular commercial district and is home to international luxury brands. Chengdu also has an amusement park, Happy Valley Chengdu, with Legoland Sichuan under construction and will be located approximately 60 km from Chengdu's city center in the Tianfu New Area. The world's largest building by total floor area, New Century Global Center, is also located in Chengdu and contains conference rooms, a water park, an IMAX theater, hotel, and commercial centers. Another attraction is the Sichuan Museum, which is southwest China's largest museum.

Other sites of interest include the Chengdu Zoo, which is the largest zoo in southwest China and exhibits more than 300 species, including giant pandas, ring-tailed lemurs, clouded leopards, and golden snub-nosed monkeys. The Haichang Polar Ocean World is a marine mammal park, similar to SeaWorld, and features exhibits including Steller sea lions, walruses, polar bears, and sand tiger sharks.
