= IgNight – Grand Finale =

Defunct nighttime show

Six Flags Great America
- Area: Hometown Square
- Status: Closed
- Opening date: June 15, 2013
- Closing date: August 13, 2013
- Replaced: Glow in the Park Parade
- Replaced by: Reflections: The Sights and Sounds of the 60s

Ride statistics
- Attraction type: Pyrotechnic, fireworks, laser, acrobatics, dance and light show
- Duration: 22:30

IgNight – Grand Finale (stylized as igNIGHT) was a nighttime show performed nightly at Six Flags Great America amusement park in Gurnee, Illinois, United States. It replaced Glow in the Park Parade, which was a nighttime parade. IgNight – Grand Finale premiered on June 15, 2013, and closed on August 13, 2013.

== History ==
Six Flags Great America teased their fans on Facebook and Twitter throughout the month of August 2012 to speculate their newest product that will be announced on August 30, 2012. Finally on August 30, 2012, Six Flags announced Six Flags Great America would introduce "the most technologically advanced show" in its park history, igNIGHT – Grand Finale. IgNight premiered on June 15, 2013 in Hometown Square, which replaced the nighttime Glow in the Park Parade that had only been in operation for three seasons. Less than two months after opening, IgNight closed on August 13, 2013.

== The show ==
IgNight transformed Hometown Square when it premiered in June 2013. The show would start at park closing every night until August 13 and ran for about 25 minutes. The show features video projections, lasers, pyrotechnics, live singing, live dancing, and fireworks. IgNight journeys from the Great Chicago Fire to the present during the show.

=== Setlist ===
Several types of new and old music are used throughout the show. Thirteen songs were used in the show:

- Chicago by Frank Sinatra
- Hit The Lights by Selena Gomez
- Tonight Tonight by Hot Chelle Rae
- Elevate by Big Time Rush
- All of the Lights (very brief) by Kanye West
- Light Up the Sky by Duncan
- Turn Up The Music by Chris Brown
- What Makes You Beautiful by One Direction
- Fire Burning by Sean Kingston
- Without You by David Guetta
- Put Your Hearts Up by Ariana Grande
- We Are Young by Fun.
- Make the World Move by Christina Aguilera
- Cupid Shuffle by Cupid
- Party Rock Anthem by LMFAO
- Girl on Fire by Alicia Keys
- My Songs Know What You Did in the Dark (Light Em Up) (finale) by Fall Out Boy
- Firework by Katy Perry

=== Experience ===
The show begins with a girl reading her great grandma Elizabeth's journal again. In the journal, her grandma meets a boy and they are having a great time until The Chicago Fire ruins their fun. Then they go to present time and the girl is told to not think about the past and go into the city and have some fun at Club IgNight. Then, a DJ comes out and starts a dance party. In the middle of the show, the same thing that happened to her Grandma Elizabeth happens to her, without a disaster. To end the show, My Songs Know What You Did in the Dark by Fall Out Boy plays while many rounds of pyrotechnics launch and go along with the music.

== See also ==
- 2013 in amusement parks
- Luminosity – Ignite the Night!
