= Studio City (Macau) =

Hotel casino resort in Macau, China

Coordinates: 22.141143°N 113.560696°E

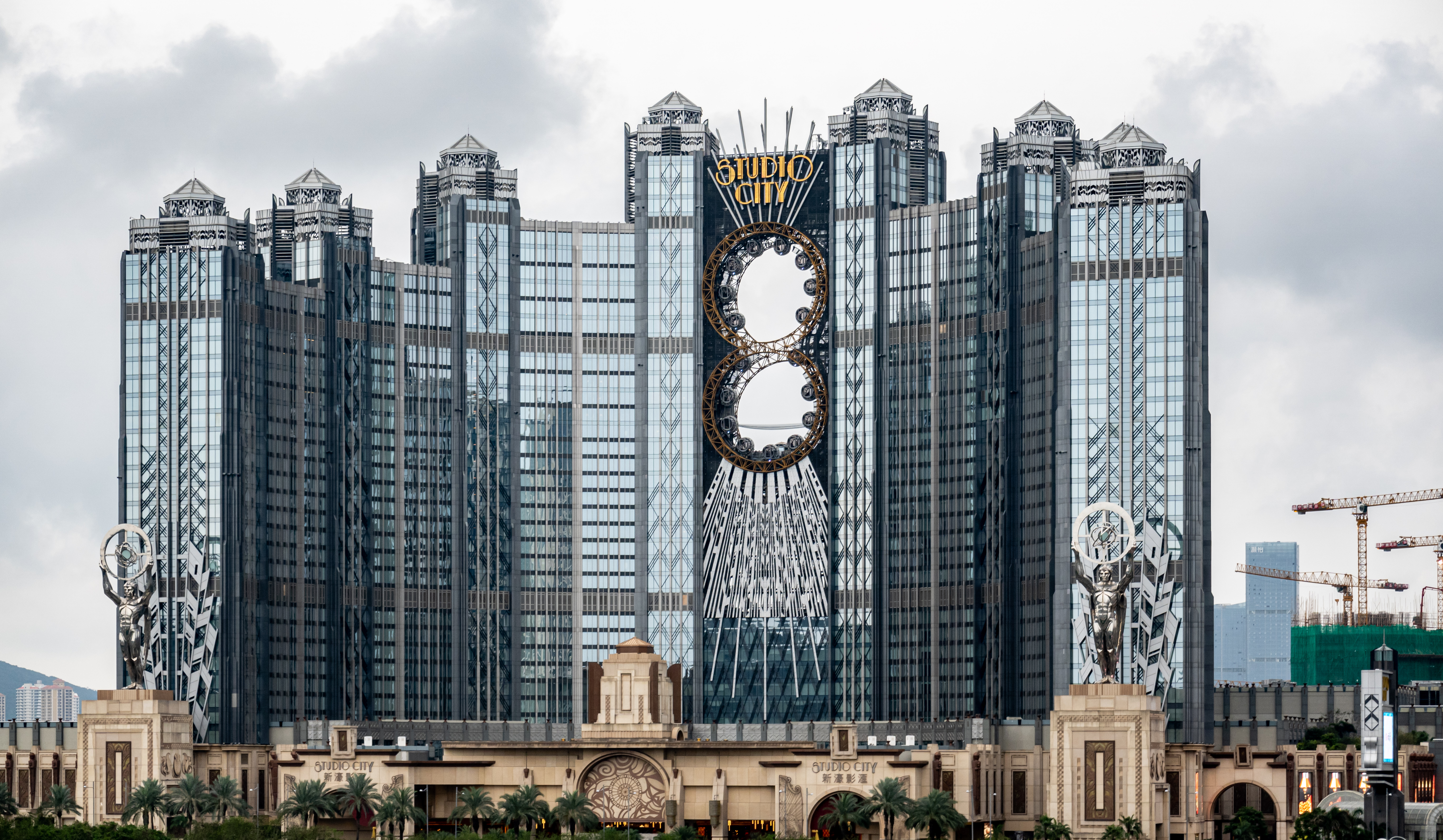
- Interactive map of Studio City 新濠影滙; Cidade do Estúdio
- Location: Cotai, Macau, China; Estr. Flor de Lotus
- Opened: 27 October 2015; 10 years ago
- Theme: Hollywood
- No. of rooms: 1,600
- Gaming space: 106,000 sq ft (9,800 m^{2})
- Signature attractions: Golden Reel; Batman Dark Flight; Zensa Spa; Studio City Water Park
- Notable restaurants: Cosmos Food Station; Pearl Dragon; Bi Ying; Hidemasa by Hide Yamamoto; Macau Gourmet Walk
- Casino type: Land-based
- Owner: Melco Resorts & Entertainment (60%)
- Architect: Goddard Group
- Website: studiocity-macau.com

Studio City
- Traditional Chinese: 新濠影滙
- Simplified Chinese: 新濠影汇
Transcriptions
Standard Mandarin
- Hanyu Pinyin: Xīnháo Yǐnghua
Yue: Cantonese
- Jyutping: san1 hou4 jing2 wui6

Portuguese name
- Portuguese: Cidade do Estúdio

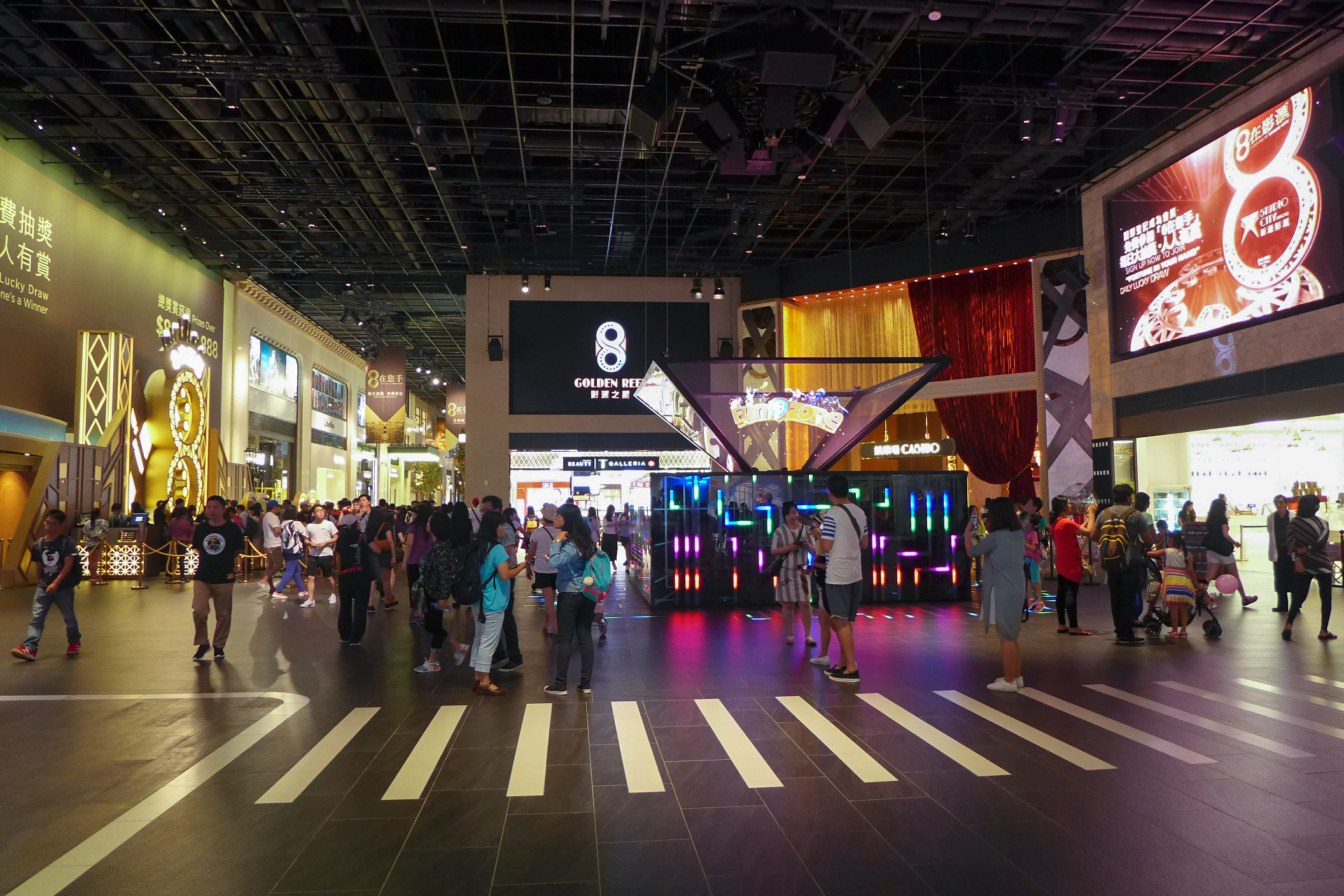
Times Square Macau

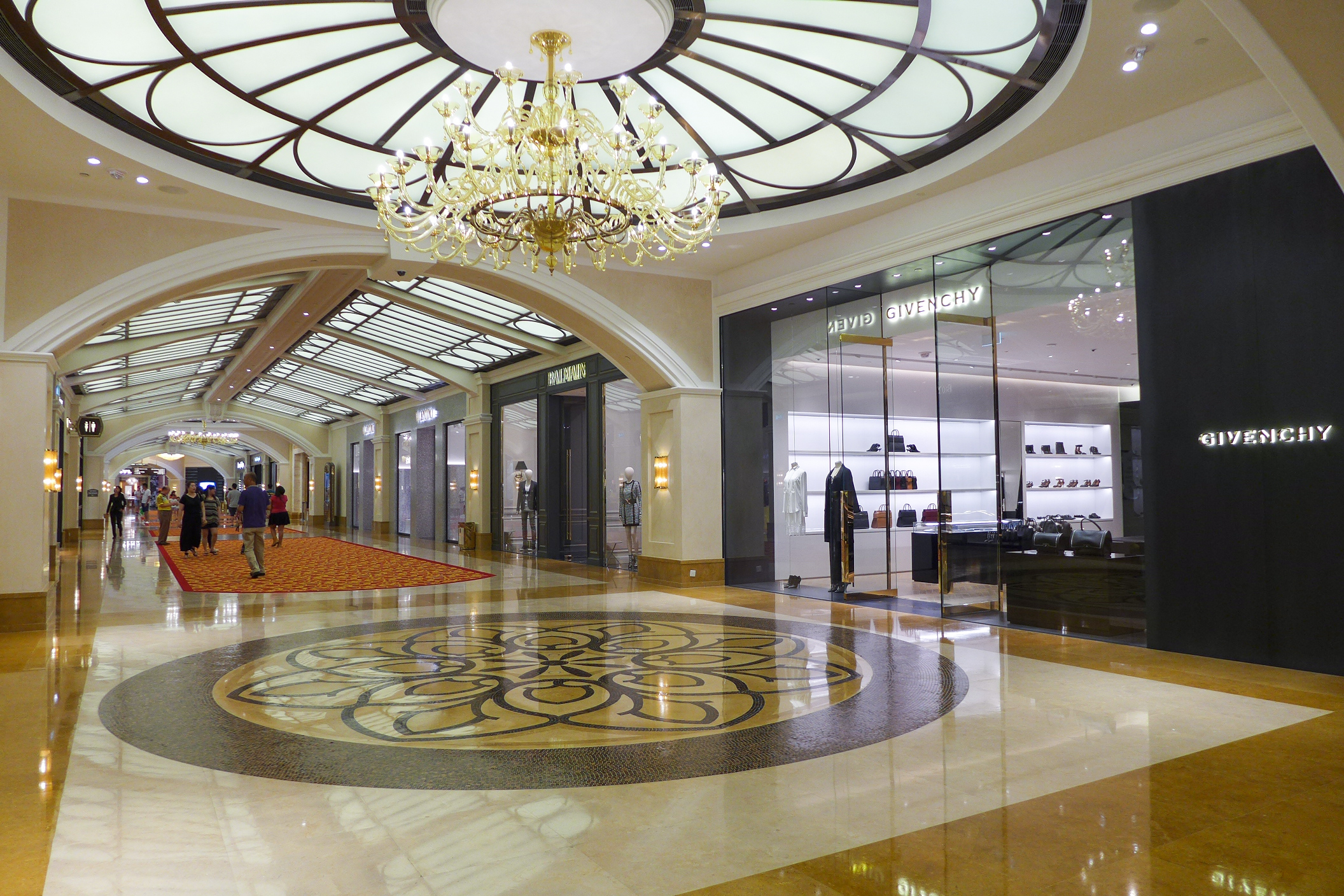
South Shops

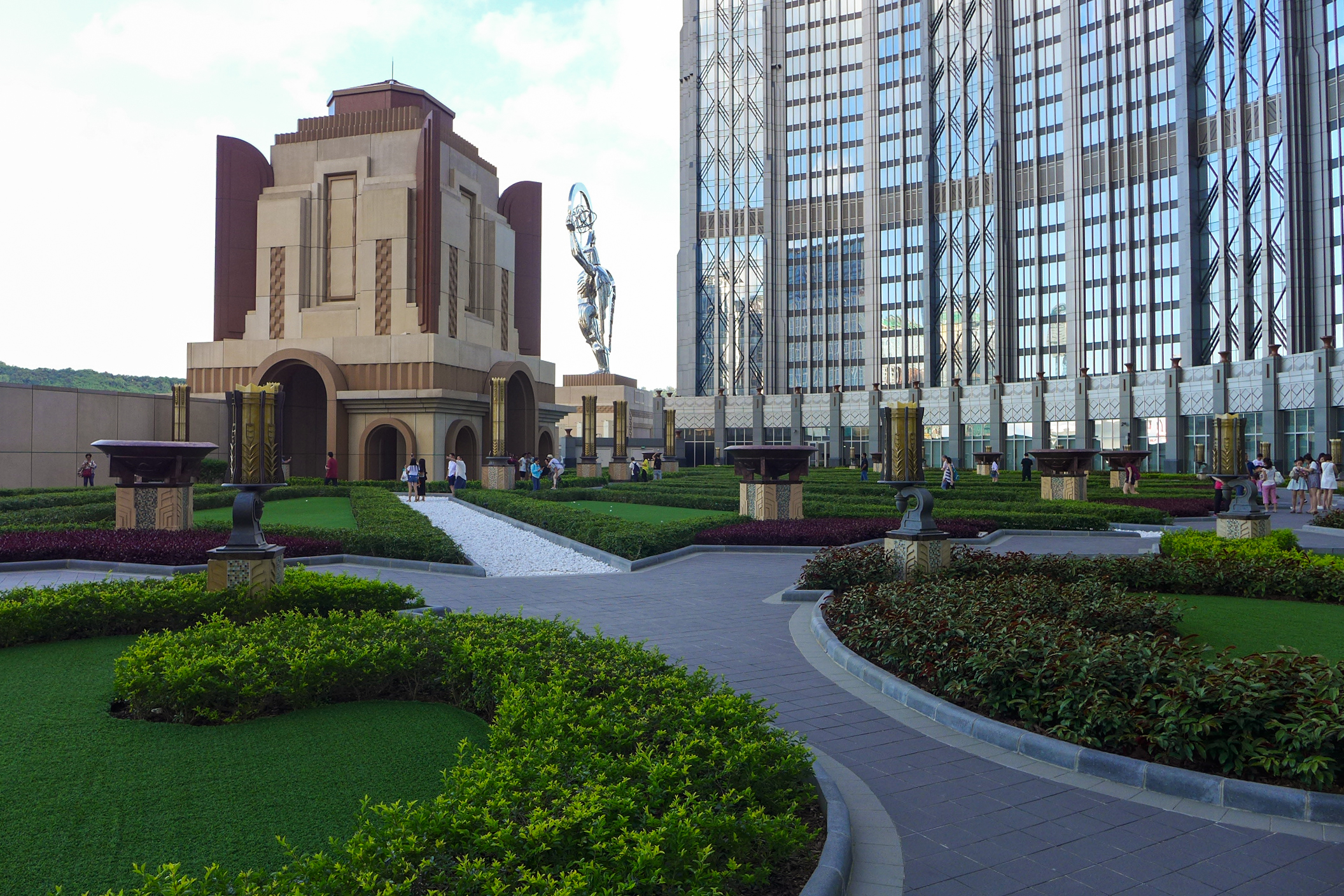
Level 3 Garden

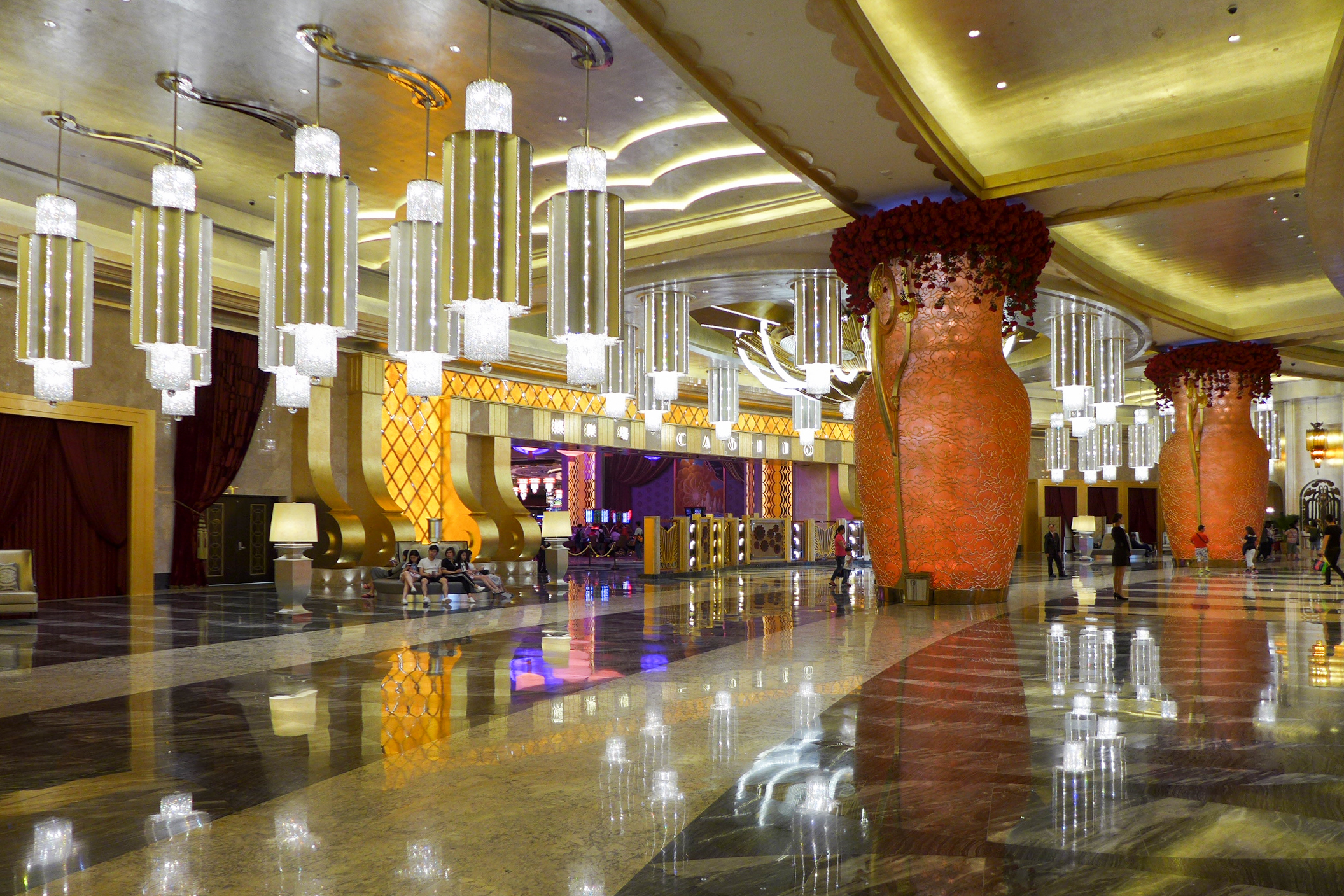
Hotel Main Lobby

Studio City is an integrated resort on the Cotai Strip in Cotai, Macau. The Hollywood studio-themed leisure resort is the first in Asia to integrate television and film production facilities, retail, gaming and hotels. It is majority-owned by Melco Resorts & Entertainment and its subsidiary Studio City International Holdings Limited (SCIHL), Its two towers are connected by the world's first and highest figure-8 ferris wheel.

== History ==
The project was initially developed without a casino by U.S. investment firms Silver Point Capital LP and Oaktree Capital Management LLC, with a 40 per cent interest through a joint subsidiary, New Cotai Holdings, and Hong Kong entertainment company eSun Holdings Ltd. In June 2011, Melco Crown Entertainment acquired eSun's 60 per cent controlling interest. Taubman Centers had also been an early investor, originally acquiring a 25 percent interest in The Mall at Studio City, the retail component of Macau Studio City, then exercised its option, withdrawing US$65 million when its 18-month condition contingent on other financing period expired, on 11 August 2009.

The $3.2 billion Studio City officially opened 27 October 2015 on Macau's Cotai Strip, adjacent to the Cotai Lotus Checkpoint Station and directly connected to the Taipa line of Macau Light Rapid Transit.

Melco Crown Entertainment commissioned a $70 million film for the grand opening of Studio City. Produced by Brett Ratner, Martin Scorsese directed Robert De Niro and Leonardo DiCaprio in the 15-minute film, The Audition, portraying fictionalized versions of themselves.

In December 2020, Star Tower at Studio City and Altira Macau, along with other Melco Resorts properties, were named among the first hotels in the world to receive Sharecare Health Security certification by Forbes Travel Guide.

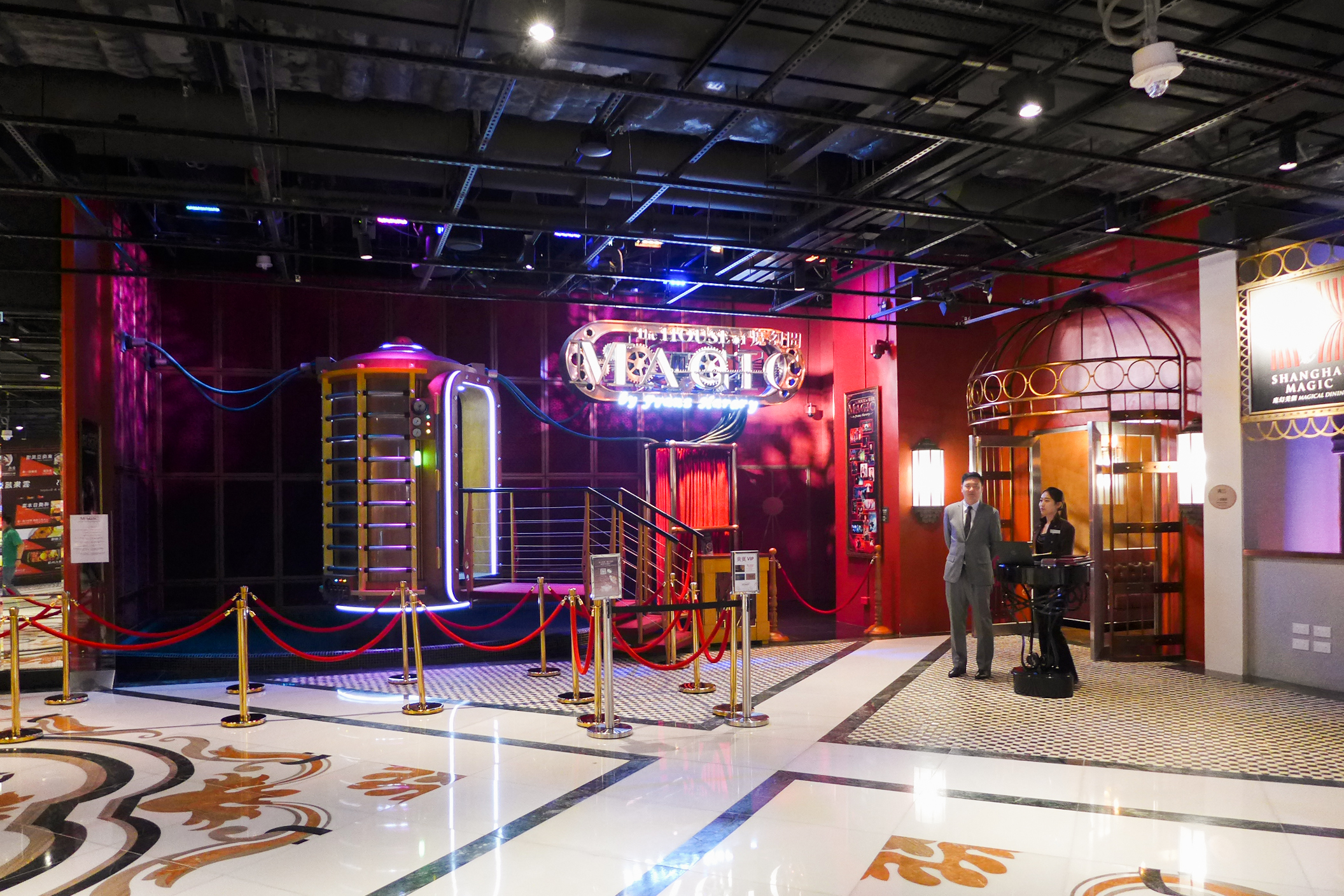
The House of Magic

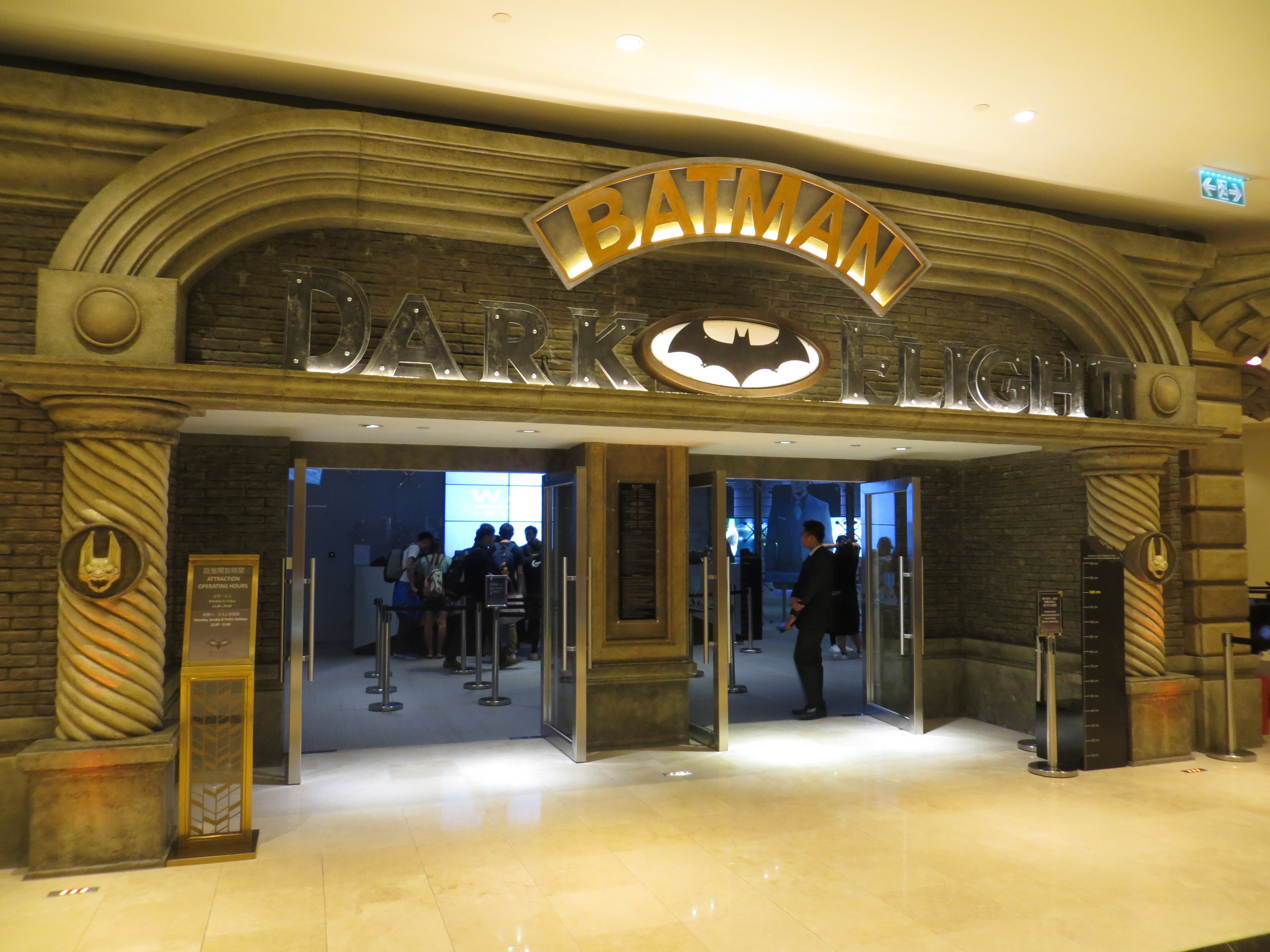
Batman: Dark Flight attraction entrance.

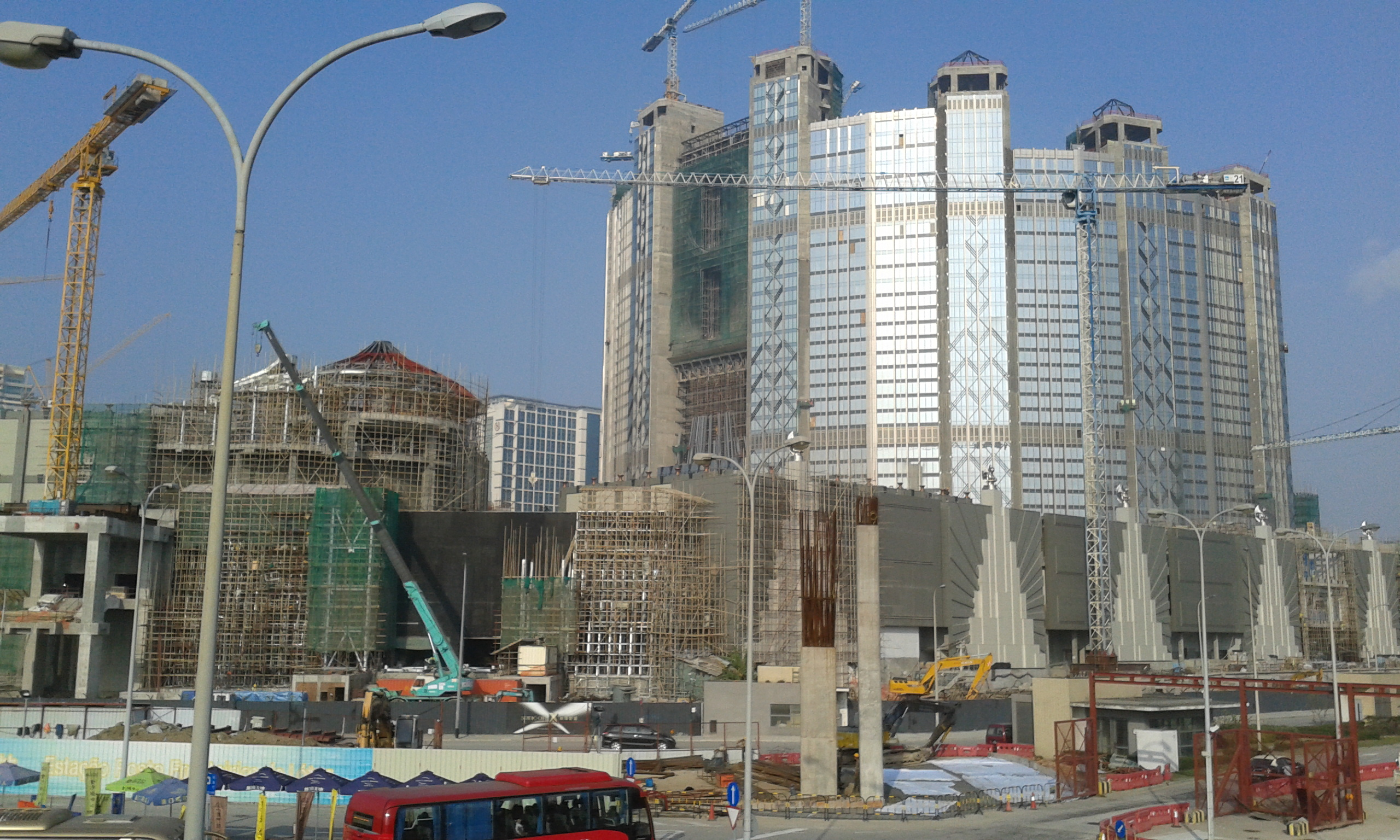
Studio City Macao under construction in January 2015.

== Design and attractions ==
Inspired by the Golden Age of Hollywood, the cinematic-themed resort comprises a 30,000-square-foot Family Entertainment Center in collaboration with Time Warner Inc. subsidiaries Warner Bros and DC Comics. The entertainment center features DC Comics characters, such as Superman, Wonder Woman and The Flash.

Studio City features an Art Deco design inspired by two asteroids shooting through a Gotham City building. The resort was designed by Goddard Group, a Los Angeles–based entertainment design firm that also designed Galaxy Macau.

The resort's two hotel towers – Star Tower and Celebrity Tower – are connected by the Golden Reel, the world's first and highest figure-8 ferris wheel. Boarding at the hotel's 23rd floor, the wheel features 17 steampunk-themed cabins holding up to 10 passengers each, also designed by the Goddard Group, with hardware manufactured by Liechtenstein's Intamin Amusement Rides. Batman Dark Flight is a 4D flight simulation theatre attraction, along with a 40,000 square foot children's playground, the Warner Brothers Fun Zone.

Facilities include Legend Heroes Park, an immersive tech-based entertainment park (TBE), a 5,000-seat live performance arena, an indoor/outdoor water park, opened in May 2021, indoor and outdoor swimming pools, a fitness centre and meeting rooms. Star Tower is rated 5-star by Forbes Travel Guide and houses several award-winning restaurants, the Zensa Spa and Pacha Macau nightclub, as well as 1,233 gaming machines and about 250 gaming tables. Studio City Event Center hosts concerts and sporting events.

Guests may also view space through giant portal windows at the Cosmos Food Station food court. Restaurants at Studio City include Michelin-starred Pearl Dragon, Bi Ying, Rossi Trattoria and Hide Yamamoto.

== Expansion ==
Construction of Studio City's Phase 2 began in 2020. The expansion included two hotel towers providing approximately 900 rooms, additional gaming areas, a cineplex, an indoor and outdoor water park, and facilities for meetings, incentives, conferences and exhibitions (MICE).

Located near the Taipa Grande Natural Park nature reserve, the two hotel towers were designed with a separation between them to accommodate bird migration routes. On 5 May 2021, the Macau government announced an extension of the development period under its land concession contract with Studio City to 27 December 2022.

In April 2023, Studio City began opening Phase 2 facilities. The first components to open were the Epic Tower hotel, comprising 338 suites equipped with the MelSuite system, and the Studio City Indoor Water Park, an all-weather, year-round attraction. The indoor water park was later connected to the adjacent Outdoor Water Park, forming a combined area of 26,000 square metres.

A second hotel, W Macau – Studio City, first announced on 28 December 2021, opened in September 2023. The hotel added 557 guestrooms, including 127 suites.

In February 2024, Melco opened DON DON DONKI at Studio City, offering popular Japanese foods products, snacks, household goods, and beauty items. The outlet also includes a “Yasuda Rice” Japanese Rice Specialty Store.

In June 2024, Studio City Cinema opened as the first Dolby Cinema in Macau and Hong Kong. The cinema comprises nine screening houses, combining the immersive sound of Dolby Atmos and the picture quality of Dolby Vision.

In October 2025, Melco introduced iRad Hospital at Studio City, operated by Hong Kong-based iRad Medical Services. The facility is the world’s first integrated resort hospital equipped with MRI and CT scan equipment. It forms part of broader efforts to diversify Macau’s economy beyond gaming.

== Entertainment events ==
Entertainment events at Studio City Macau
Date	Artist	Event	Ref
2019
28-29 December	Winner	Cross Tour	
2024
22 June	Nmixx	"NMIXX Change Up: MIXX University" Fan concert	
29 June	Daesung	D's Road Fanday Tour	
31 August, 1 September	The Boyz	The Boyz Zeneration II World Tour	
21-22 September	Aespa	Synk: Parallel Line World Tour	
28-29 September	Red Velvet	Happiness: My Dear, ReVe1uv	
2025
11-12 January	Infinite	15th Anniversary Concert - Limited Edition	
18-19 January	Super Junior-D&E	[ECLIPSE] World Tour	
15 February	WayV	On The Way Tour	
2 March	Yesung	[It's Complicated] Asia Tour	
23 August	Daesung	D's WAVE Asia Tour	

== See also ==
- Gambling in Macau
- Cotai
- List of integrated resorts
