= Monster Mansion =

Dark ride at Six Flags Over Georgia

Monster Mansion aka Monster Plantation
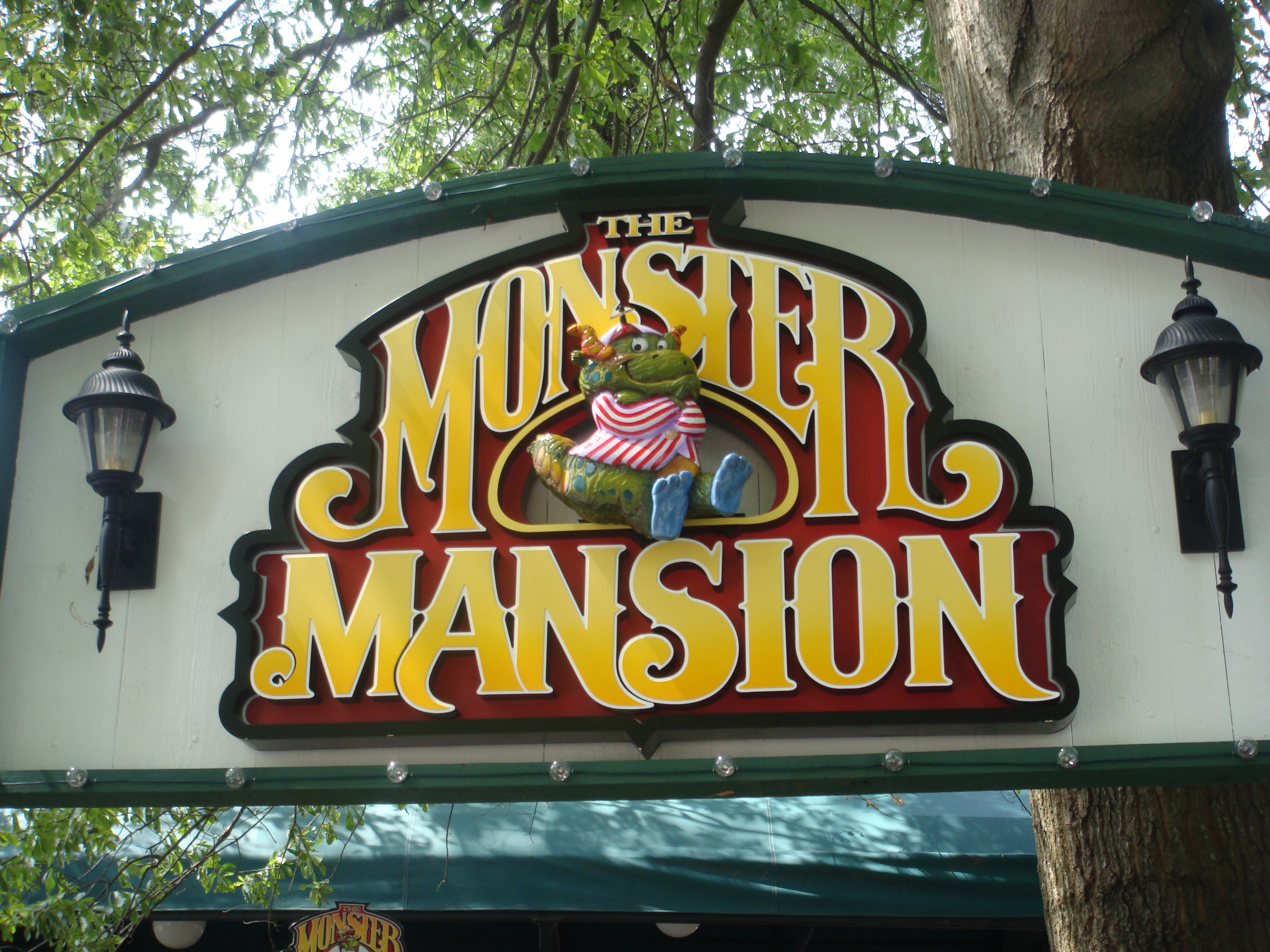
- Monster Mansion sign at Six Flags over Georgia

Six Flags Over Georgia
- Status: Operating
- Opening date: 1981 (as Monster Plantation); 2009 (as Monster Mansion)
- Replaced: Tales of the Okefenokee (1967–1980)

General statistics
- Type: Dark ride
- Manufacturer: Arrow Development
- Designer: Gary Goddard, Al Bertino, Phil Mendez, Tony Christopher
- Lift system: 7 feet
- Length: 700 ft (210 m)
- Site area: 25,000 sq ft (2,300 m^{2})
- Type: Water ride
- Lift count: 1
- Number of drops: 1
- Fast Lane available

Monster Mansion (formerly Monster Plantation and, originally, Tales of the Okefenokee) is a mill chute ride at Six Flags Over Georgia located in Mableton, Georgia. Aboard six-passenger boats, riders pass through nine scenes along the 700 foot-long flume, passing by over 107 original animatronic characters.

== Tales of the Okefenokee (1967–1980) ==
From the park's opening in 1967 until 1980, the building that currently houses Monster Mansion was home to one of the park's original attractions, a boat mill chute-type ride called Tales of the Okefenokee: The Old Plantation Legends, with theming inspired by the Uncle Remus stories of Joel Chandler Harris.

Tales of the Okefenokee

Six Flags Over Georgia
- Area: Confederacy
- Status: Removed
- Opening date: June 16, 1967
- Closing date: 1980
- Replaced by: Monster Plantation

General statistics
- Type: Dark ride
- Designer: Gene Patrick (1967), Sid and Marty Kroft (1968-1980)
- Lift system: 7 feet
- Length: 700 ft (210 m)

The 1967 version of Tales of the Okefenokee has minimal documentation, though has been confirmed to be designed by Gene Patrick. An instrumental figure in numerous theme parks and entertainment ventures (including the now-defunct Six Flags AstroWorld, Carowinds, and Chuck E. Cheese's Pizza Time Theatre to name a few), Patrick had previously designed the Spee-Lunker's Cave dark ride for Six Flags Over Texas. The end product contained an array of detailed murals and scenery. However, these ultimately clashed with the small-scaled character figures, dissatisfying Six Flags founder Angus G. Wynne. Wynne's criticisms regarding the 1967 Okefenokee were reportedly toward Gene Patrick's figures in particular, stating they were "too small" and "looked like window displays."

The following year, the original Tales of the Okefenokee attraction was redesigned by puppeteers Sid and Marty Krofft, whom Six Flags had worked with previously on puppet shows for both Six Flags Over Georgia and Six Flags Over Texas. Six Flags Over Georgia had opened with a 1,000 seat puppet theater hosting "The Krofft Circus" puppet show. Most of the original sets from the previous iteration remained the same, with the Kroffts' focus being more on the animated figures, sound, and music. The second incarnation of Okefenokee was loosely inspired by Walt Disney's 1946 film, Song of the South, as well as the Little Golden Books based on the film, with many cartoonish elements lifted from the works of Jay Ward, Hanna-Barbera, and Rankin/Bass Productions. Voices for the 1968 version of the ride were provided by Lennie Weinrib, Joan Gerber, and Marty Krofft, all of which were involved with the Kroffts' television series H.R. Pufnstuf at the time.

=== Ride summary ===
The Krofft's Tales of the Okefenokee is the only incarnation of the original attraction to be properly documented in terms of storyline.

After taking a seat inside of a fiberglass boat themed after an Indian craft made of animal skins, the boat moves on. Ahead, an entrance to the ride has two cutouts of anthropomorphic rabbits holding signs that read "Keep hands inside the boat" and "Do not feed the bunnies".

Going into the entrance, guests are surrounded by a large colorful environment of various artificial plants, including bushes and large trees with Spanish moss hanging from the branches. Rounding the first bend, guests see their first sign of activity, with owls blinking and hooting in the branches above them, and a quartet of harmonic crows singing to welcome their new "neighbor".

After receiving their welcome, guests float past the Okefenokee Swamp's fishing hole, located in the ruins of an old Civil War era plantation home. Mr. Rabbit, Mr. Fox, and Mr. Bear are all fishing with hooks and bait, while a bullfrog is working on his suntan and a raccoon fumbles with his picnic basket. In one corner of the scene, a turtle rocks himself to sleep on the back of his shell, as if it were a cradle, while snoring.

The boat then enters a cave, and guests are unable to see what lies ahead except for a giant green snake peering down at them. The boat rounds another bend, and suddenly the vista opens up. The critters of the Okefenokee have formed a "dixie band" led by Mr. Rabbit, who is wielding a crude baton. A pink female rabbit is behind him, clanging pot lids together as if they are hand cymbals, while a chubby brown boy rabbit wearing a beanie plays a washboard. Also, a raccoon beats an inverted pot like a drum, while the third rabbit behind him somehow manages to play a toilet plunger like a trumpet, followed by a turtle blowing on a jug and a fourth rabbit drumming on the turtle's shell.

Across the river from the band, a patch of 12 sentient carrots with the faces of women wearing lots of makeup sing out over and over again, telling guests that whatever they do they must "Save the rabbit!" or else he will "wind up in a kettle of stew!". As the boat heads further down in front of Mr. Bear's shack, guests see that Mr. Fox and Mr. Bear have captured Mr. Rabbit and have put him inside a burlap sack. A chicken can be seen continually sticking his head out of the window, clucking and screaming for help.

The boat floats past more of Mr. Bear's crops, and soon the boat arrives at another grotto in the swamp. It seems that Mr. Rabbit has been saved by the friendly owls, who are circling overhead, carrying a large white sheet. Mr. Fox and Mr. Bear, seeing it from below, think that the sheet is a real ghost, and are terrified, cringing at the sight of the "apparition".

More trees and foliage interrupt the guests' view, and the boat approaches another clearing, revealing two rabbit children playing with marionettes (possibly a reference Sid and Marty Krofft made to themselves) that are unflattering caricatures of Mr. Fox and Mr. Bear, while the rest of the bunny family are busy helping their father milk a cow in the corner.

Up ahead the crow quartet returns, but instead of a happy upbeat song, they are singing a dire warning of the creatures ahead that "are liable to scorn you" as a dark, forbidding cave approaches. Guests stumble across the secret arsenal of Mr. Fox and Mr. Bear inside of a blacklit cave, including an extensive array of cannons, cannonballs, gunpowder, and TNT which they intend to use in destroying the entire Okefenokee Swamp. After guests learn of their dark secrets, the evil duo attempt to kill the witnesses by firing at the boat with their rifles.

After barely escaping with their lives and emerging from the cave, guests see that everything has become pitch black except for a red glow in the distance coming from around the bend. After going around said bend, guests are confronted by a tree that has fallen over the river, forming a natural archway. On top of the tree, Mr. Fox and Mr. Bear have gotten ahead of the boat and are swinging red railroad-style lanterns, both chanting "Beware! Beware! Go back! Go back!". The boat heads up another incline, getting closer and closer to the both of them. It then goes down a small drop, causing a splash.

The Okefenokee Swamp is then engulfed in a thunderstorm, and the tone intensifies. A large tree with an evil face suddenly creaks forward at the boat. Owls with glowing eyes glare at the boat from multiple directions, and rattlesnakes hang down from tree branches. Guests feel gusts of air and lightning flashes, while backlit bats fly overhead, and an alligator in the water snaps its jaws at the boat.

The boat then approaches the briar patch, the home of Mr. Rabbit and his family, therefore, alleviating the tension. Once inside, guests learn that it's Christmas time, and the rabbit family is seen preparing their holiday feast. Mr. Rabbit is carving a giant carrot like a roast turkey (formerly a roast turkey), and the children are impatiently banging their utensils on the table. Next to the fireplace, a Christmas tree is decorated with carrots instead of ornaments, and the children sing a Christmas carol.

Outside of the rabbits' home, the night sky is clear and everything is moonlit. Mr. Bear and Mr. Fox sit soggily in the frog pond and are covered with frogs as their eyes move in a strange way. In the next scene, Mr. Rabbit uses a stick to shake a bee hive, and the angry swarm of bees chase the two panting villains into the distance. On the other side of the river, various critters of the Okefenokee are celebrating this newfound peace, singing their "national anthem". One of the rabbits is floating in the air by a bunch of colorful balloons, a rabbit and a turtle are playing on a seesaw, a raccoon balances small rabbits on his shoulders, and a magician (formerly a rabbit child playing with a hula hoop) and juggler entertain visitors. The quartet of crows also returns for a third time, singing with everyone else. Watermelon trees growing watermelons with faces can also be seen, singing as well.

Overhead, a jolly sun laughs with glee at the sight of the fun below. The last person seen is Miss Rabbit, who says "Bye now... y'all hurry back, ya hear?". The boat then enters a final cave which is studded with multicolored diamonds, and then the ride ends.

=== Other ===
In an early-mid-1970s co-promotion, Tales of the Okefenokee was sponsored by Domino Sugar. Five-pound bags of Domino Sugar had a $1.00 Six Flags coupon printed on the package, and the Domino Sugar Bear made appearances at the ride. Advertisements for the promotion appeared in newspapers throughout the Southeast.

==== Deterioration ====
The humidity inside the building caused the fur on the animatronic animals to dissolve at a very fast rate. Also, repeating the same movements over and over non-stop eventually caused mechanical problems with the ride, such as wearing down machinery and stripping gears. The singing carrots failed one by one and rather than being replaced with new animatronics, tall bushes were put in their place, one for each failed carrot.

==== Fire ====
During the ride's final season of operation, one of the singing carrots caught on fire, burning the entire scene. Watermelons from the ride's ending scene were used to fill the space. This, as well as the other mechanical issues with the ride, led to its closure in 1980.

==== Successor ====
Tales of the Okefenokee was later pointed as a possible predecessor of the Disney's log flume ride Splash Mountain, which was based on the animated sequences of Disney's 1946 film Song of the South and opened in Disneyland nine years after the closure of Tales of the Okefenokee. Tony Baxter, the creator of Splash Mountain, had ridden Tales of the Okefenokee many times prior to its closure in 1980 and also implied in a Q&A that he also drew inspiration from this ride to create Splash Mountain.

== Monster Plantation (1981–2008) ==
In 1980, Six Flags decided to create an updated successor to Tales of the Okefenokee and chose production supervisor Dave Gengenbach to lead the project. Gengenbach, who had served as a Disney project engineer at Disney for 13 years, turned to newly formed Goddard Productions (Gengenbach had worked at Disney with Goddard, who left Disney in 1980 to form his own company) to work on the new attraction for the 1981 season. Production team member Al Bertino, another Disney park alumnus and the inspiration for Big Al in the Country Bear Jamboree attraction, later said that the idea for the attraction came to him while he was playing with his granddaughter, who was pretending to be a monster. Construction on the new ride began in September 1980, and details about the new ride were revealed at a gala held at the High Museum of Art on January 15, 1981. The figures for the ride were built by AVG Productions. The cost of the ride's redesign exceeded US$3 million.

The ride invites guests to visit the Plantation for a "Monster Picnic", where humans are now allowed to visit. The monsters welcome their new human friends with music, games, and a carnival. The Marshall, Billy Bob Fritter and his canine-like partner Fritter Bitter warn the humans early on to "Stay out of the Marsh". Despite his warnings, the guest's boat ends up at a fork in the river that leads them right into the Marsh; where dark and terrifying monsters dwell. Just when riders feel that the end is near, Marshall Billy Bob wards off the creatures with a blast from a confederate cannon and guides riders back to safety.

In September 2008, Six Flags announced that the ride would close for a renovation.

== Monster Mansion (2009–present) ==
The Goddard Group created the Glow in the Park Parade for several Six Flags locations in 2008. Six Flags management approached designer Gary Goddard about the possibility of renewing the Monster Plantation ride at Six Flags Over Georgia. Over the fall and winter of 2008, Six Flags' Monster Plantation was completely overhauled by Goddard's company.

Many of the original creators participated in the renewal, including Phil Mendez who originally designed all 107 characters, and Dick Hamilton, who had written the theme song. Monster Mansion follows the same basic plot and premise as the original Monster Plantation, but infuses the attraction with modern technologies, effects, and storytelling techniques. During the renewal, each of the original characters were refurbished from the inside out, including new mechanics, fur, and renewed costumes based on the originals. Eight new characters were added, and all original murals were discarded and new murals, designed by Disney Animation production designer Phil Phillipson, were installed. Every light and speaker in the building was also replaced.

Renamed "Monster Mansion", this new attraction made its debut to the press on May 14, 2009, and to the public on May 16, 2009. Six Flags Over Georgia also renamed the nearby Looney Tunes Treasures gift shop "Monstore" and stocked it with a variety of Monster Plantation merchandise.

The attraction was ranked fifth in the Amusement Today's Golden Ticket Awards for best new ride of 2009.

In early 2023, Six Flags Over Georgia announced on its official Twitter page that the attraction would undergo a major, ongoing refurbishment/rehab/upgrade during the 2023 operating season, including an updated opening scene, new monster costumes, restored animatronics, interactive features, and enhanced lighting, audio, and special effects.

== Production ==
The ride track for Monster Mansion is 700 feet in length, with 613 feet of that in the dark, enclosed within the show building. Monster Mansion's main show building is 25,246 square feet in size.

== See also ==
- Splash Mountain, another ride that has theming inspired by the Uncle Remus stories.
