= Siren's Curse =

Roller coaster at Cedar Point

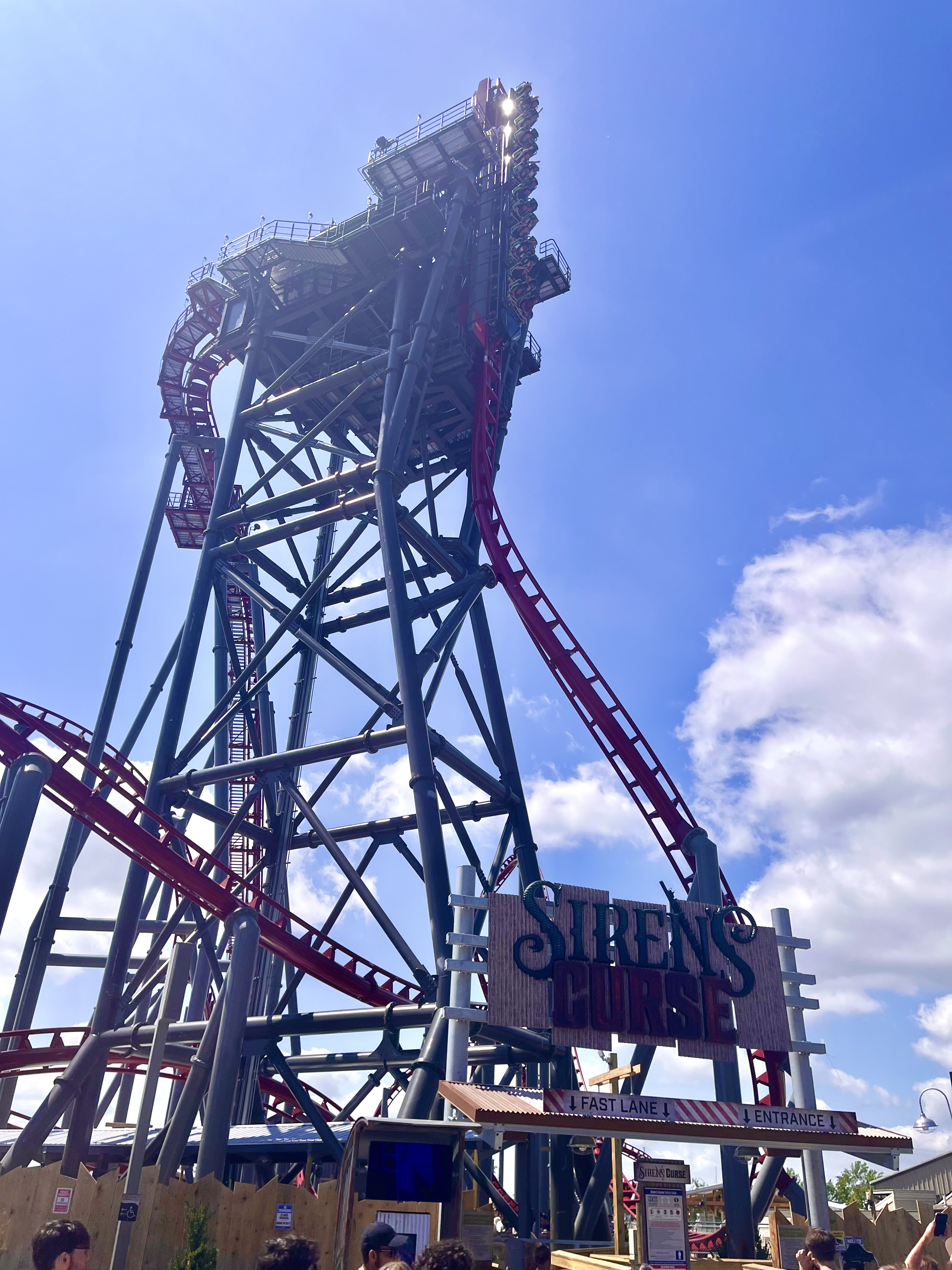
- View of Siren's Curse's entrance and tilt track

Cedar Point
- Location: Cedar Point
- Park section: Millennium Midway
- Coordinates: 41.4815617°N 82.6848090°W
- Status: Operating
- Soft opening date: June 23, 2025
- Opening date: June 28, 2025
- Replaced: WildCat; Luminosity – Ignite the Night! Cedars Dorm

General statistics
- Type: Steel
- Manufacturer: Vekoma
- Model: Tilt Coaster
- Lift/launch system: Chain lift hill
- Height: 160 ft (49 m)
- Length: 2,966 ft (904 m)
- Speed: 58 mph (93 km/h)
- Inversions: 2
- Max vertical angle: 90°
- Height restriction: 48–80 in (122–203 cm)
- Trains: 2 trains with 6 cars; riders arranged 2 across in 2 rows for a total of 24 riders per train
- Website: Official website
- Fast Lane Plus only available
- Siren's Curse at RCDB

Siren's Curse is a steel roller coaster located at Cedar Point in Sandusky, Ohio. The Tilt Coaster model, manufactured by Vekoma, opened to the public on June 28, 2025. The ride has a length of 2,966 feet (904 m) with a maximum height of 160 feet (49 m), a 90-degree drop, and two inversions. It was North America’s only Tilt Coaster until Circuit Breaker opened at COTALAND in October 2025. The ride is Cedar Point's third roller coaster installation in as many years, after Wild Mouse (2023) and Top Thrill 2 (2024).

Siren's Curse's theme is tied to the park's presence on Lake Erie and the old Lake Erie Shipping Co, making reference to Greek mythology, where "sirens" were female beings who sent sailors to their demise via songs. The ride's trains features an integrated audio and lighting system to tie into the theme.

== History ==
=== Background ===
Six Flags México first received the prototype track pieces in June 2024. The following month, the park held a public consultation for the construction of "Roller Coaster Type A", with work on the ride intended to take place over the course of ten months. The coaster would have replaced the Aquaman SplashDown shoot the chute water ride and other surrounding infrastructure. The Mexico City government refused to endorse the attraction plans due to their planned tree removals; Six Flags issued a statement on July 16 that they had found an alternative placement.

Six Flags had completed a merger with Cedar Fair on July 1, placing Six Flags México and Cedar Point under the same ownership. Cedar Point had previously launched a survey in April 2024 featuring several models of coasters for future installation, of which a Tilt Coaster was an option.

=== Announcement and debut ===
Cedar Point first hinted at the coaster on September 13, 2024, stating "Something Is Surfacing" on their social media accounts. Siren's Curse was announced on September 19, 2024, as North America's tallest, fastest, and longest tilt coaster. The announcement came as a surprise to many as there was no physical or virtual indication a new roller coaster was in the works. The construction phase of the ride started in November, and it was managed by Dave Evans. That same month, the pouring of concrete for the ride's foundation began.

Siren's Curse soft opened on June 23, 2025, offering its first rides to employees. It offered its first public rides on June 26, 2025, as a part of the Prayers from Maria Children’s Cancer Foundation fundraising event. A season passholder exclusive early access event was held on June 27, and the ride opened to the public on June 28.

== Ride experience ==
After dispatching from the station, trains climb a 160 foot (49 m) lift hill before making a slight left turn onto the tilt track. After the train locks in place, the track tilts downwards to a 90-degree angle before being released. Following the drop, trains ascend a hill before turning to the right and entering a corkscrew. Next, trains descend a triple down into a tunnel. Trains then traverse two hills, a second corkscrew, a wave turn, and a final set of hills before entering the final brake run.

== Characteristics ==
=== Location ===
Siren's Curse is located along the Millennium Midway/Celebration Plaza, taking the place of the former WildCat roller coaster, which closed in 2011. Since, the site had mostly been used as viewing for the parks shows on the Celebration Stage, such as the former nighttime show Luminosity. The Celebration Stage was demolished to provide more space along the midway. The adjacent Perimeter Road was also rerouted, allowing the ride to utilize vacant land formerly occupied by the Cedars employee dorms, which were demolished in 2019.

=== Manufacturer ===
Siren's Curse is a Tilt Coaster manufactured by Vekoma, the first installation of its kind since Gravity Max's opening at Lihpao Land in 2002. It is similar in design to Circuit Breaker at COTALAND and Iron Rattler at Six Flags Qiddiya City, which each opened later in 2025.

=== Trains ===
Siren's Curse operates with two trains that consists of six cars with four seats per car, for a total capacity of 24 riders per train. Riders must be at least 48 inches (120 cm) tall to ride. The ride's trains feature an integrated audio and lighting system to tie into the theme of "sirens" on Lake Erie. For safety, riders can not bring loose items onto the ride, and metal detectors are installed at the beginning of the queue.

=== Track ===
The steel tubular track is 2,965 feet (904 m) long, and the lift is approximately 160 feet (49 m) high. The track color is red with the supports being dark gray. The structure of the lift hill was designed to replicate a shipping crane tower on Lake Erie. Cedar Point describes the tilt aspect of the drop as a "broken off" piece of track that tilts 90 degrees to drop passengers.

== Awards ==
The ride placed third in Amusement Today's Golden Ticket Awards for the title of Best New Roller Coaster.

Golden Ticket Awards: Top steel Roller Coasters
Year									1998	1999
Ranking									–	–
Year	2000	2001	2002	2003	2004	2005	2006	2007	2008	2009
Ranking	–	–	–	–	–	–	–	–	–	–
Year	2010	2011	2012	2013	2014	2015	2016	2017	2018	2019
Ranking	–	–	–	–	–	–	–	–	–	–
Year	2020	2021	2022	2023	2024	2025	2026			
Ranking	N/A	–	–	–	–	–	49 (tie)			
