= Luminosity – Ignite the Night! =

Nighttime show performed by Cedar Point

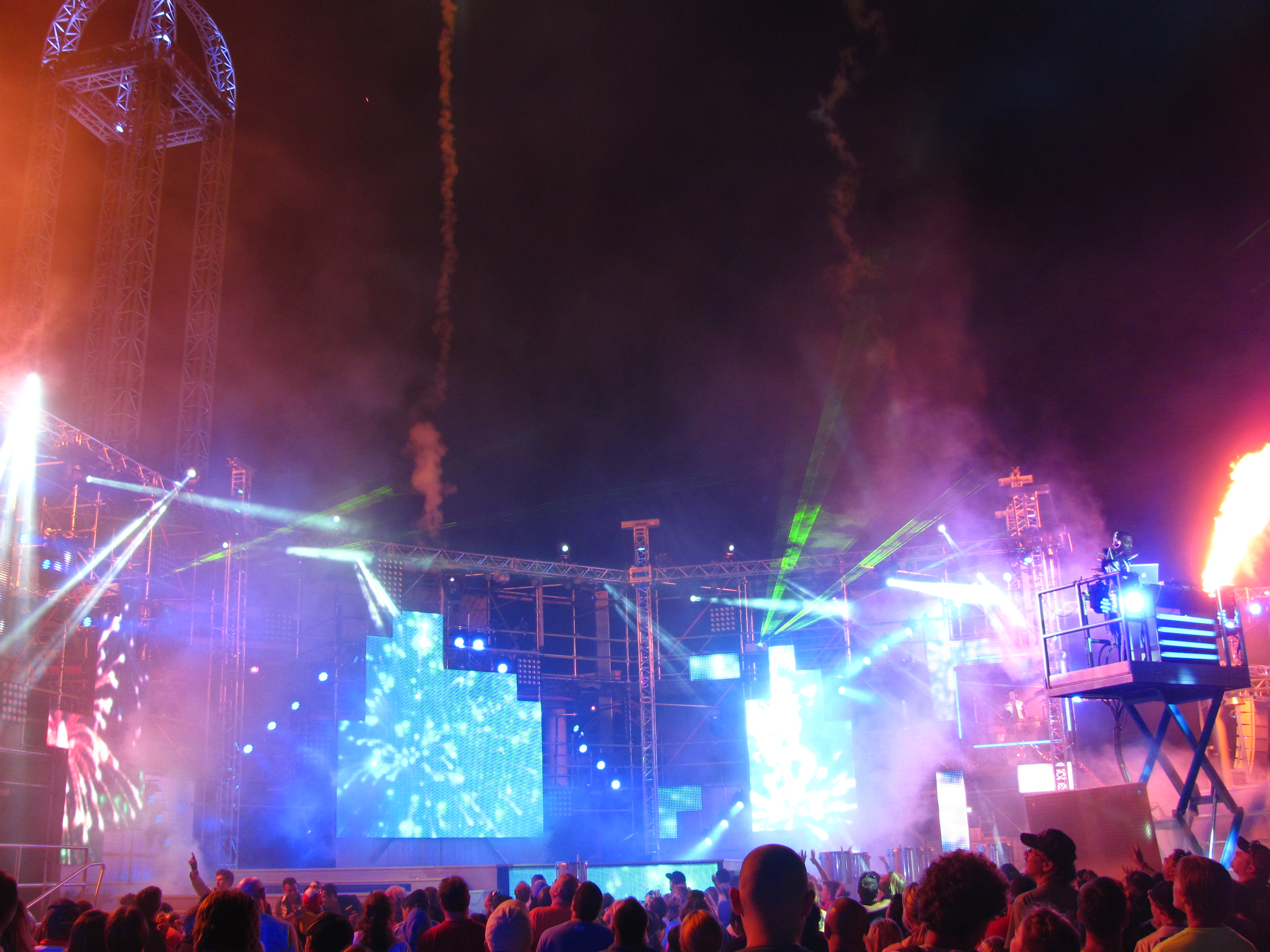
- Luminosity's stage and DJ with Power Tower in the background.

Cedar Point
- Area: Celebration Plaza
- Coordinates: 41.480033°N 82.681818°W
- Status: Removed
- Cost: $6,000,000
- Soft opening date: June 1, 2012
- Opening date: June 8, 2012
- Closing date: August 20, 2017
- Replaced: American Portrait; WildCat
- Replaced by: Siren's Curse

Ride statistics
- Attraction type: Pyrotechnic, fireworks, laser, acrobatics, dance and light show
- Designer: RWS and Associates (2012); Chauvet Professional
- Duration: 25 minutes
- Performers: 25 dancers, 3 drummers, 2 cirque dancers, and 2 D.J's.
- Sponsor: North Coast Container; Marathon Petroleum

Luminosity – Ignite the Night!, often shortened to Luminosity (previously named Luminosity - Powered by Pepsi), was a nighttime show performed nightly at Cedar Point amusement park in Sandusky, Ohio. It replaced American Portrait and the WildCat roller coaster. The show opened for previews on June 1, 2012 and held its grand-opening one week later. It ran nightly at 9:15 pm until August 19. From 2013 to 2017, the show ran every night at 9:30 pm except Tuesdays from May 31 – August 18.

The show was free with admission to the park. During the day, the stage was used for the Peanuts' Celebration at the Point show. It is also used during HalloWeekends for a show called Skeleton Crew.

== History ==
Thoughts of a new way to improve the nighttime environment began in summer 2011 when the now previous Cedar Fair CEO, Matt Ouimet was in the park one night and thought they should add more lights and excitement. The goal was to create a new show that would energize the main midway with bright lights and music. Matt Ouimet first mentioned the show at a conference in January 2012. Details of Luminosity were first announced at the PointBuzz winter tour of Cedar Point on February 25, 2012. The 3,600 square foot screen used for American Portrait and Hot Summer Lights was taken down on February 28 because it was not needed for the new show. On April 13, Cedar Point officially announced Luminosity. The show debuted on June 1 for previews and its grand opening was held on June 8.

Cedar Point worked mainly with the Emmy Award-Winning RWS and Associates and Chauvet Professional to build the production. They wanted RWS to bring in "the biggest, grandest and most expensive night show in Cedar Point's history". Award-winning choreographer EJ Ferencak and Alicia Pociask were responsible for the choreography of the show. Installation took four months and rehearsal occupied three weeks. The park also worked with Chauvet to set up and program the lights, as well as the lights used on Millennium Force and Power Tower. In 2013, Cedar Point built the show "in-house", meaning RWS would not coordinate the show. In addition, the show was performed every night except Tuesday. It has been confirmed by Cedar Point that Luminosity will be replaced by Vertical Impact, an acrobatic and stunt show that will run many times during the day on the same stage, near Iron Dragon. The last show was performed on August 20, 2017.

== Overview ==
As part of Luminosity, several enhancements to the midway and rides were made. A new LED lighting package, similar to the park's WindSeeker, was installed on Millennium Force, Power Tower and the Giant Wheel. Towers with LED graphics and a new sound and light system were installed along the main midway from the front gate to Corkscrew. Gobo patterns were projected from the towers onto the midway and buildings. More than one million lights, including the lights on the stage, rides and buildings were added. Chauvet Professional supplied 700 lights for Luminosity. They also added 36 wash lights to the base of Millennium Force and 16 lights to the base and top of Power Tower.

The three-story stage ran parallel to the midway. The back of the stage is 25 feet (7.6 m) high and the length is 75 feet (23 m) long. Several screens were located on behind the main stage with two that showed close-ups of the performers on the sides of the stage. The stage had video walls made of one-hundred twelve MVP 18 and thirty-seven MVP 37.5 modular video panels. Two screens are next to the control booths and bleachers.

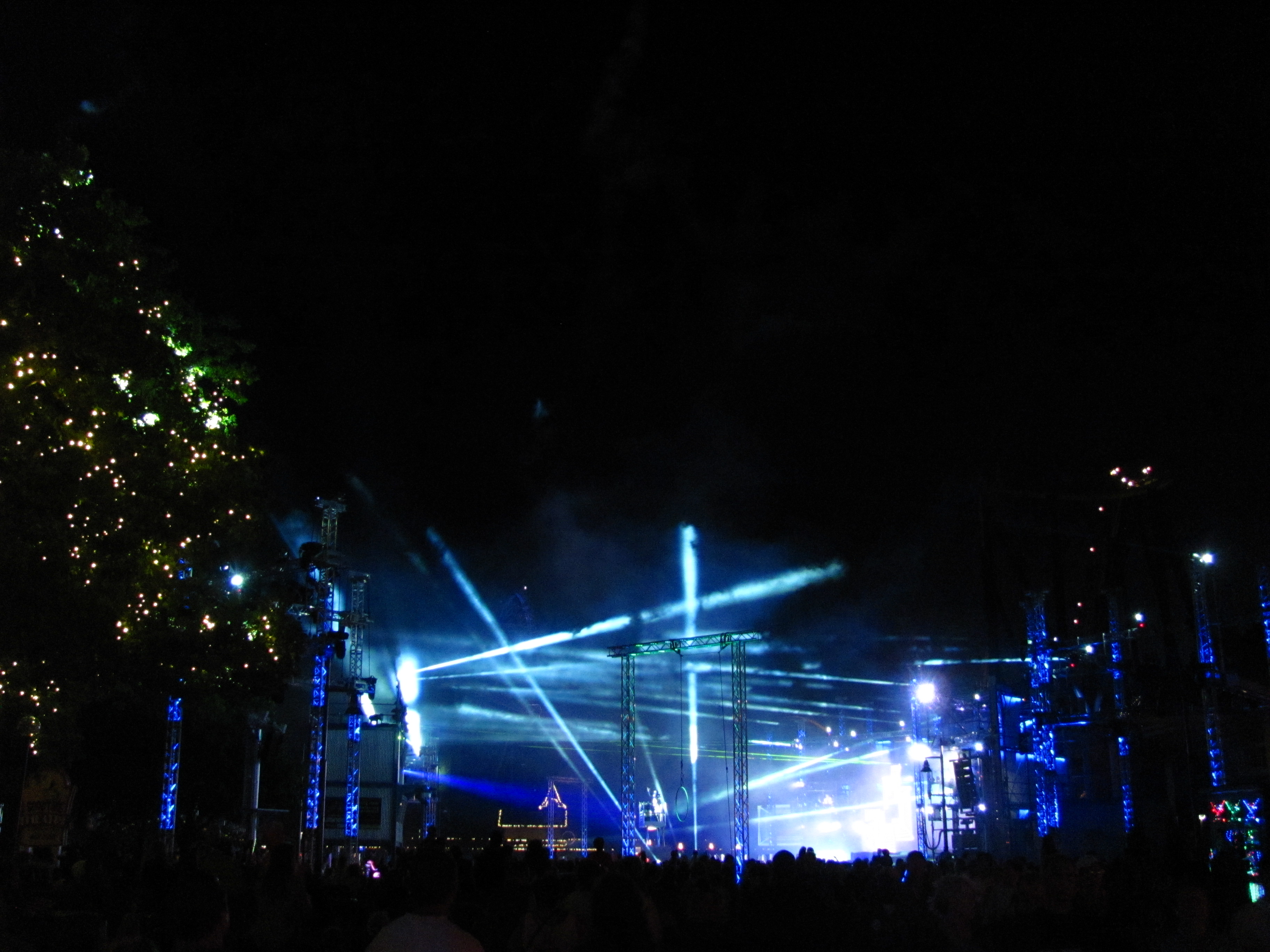
Celebration Plaza during Luminosity

The new show transformed Iron Dragon midway into a new area called Celebration Plaza. The area featured curved edges. A new entrance and queueing area was built for Iron Dragon because the new stage occupied the old queue and entrance area. The control booths used for American Portrait were relocated to the side of the midway. On May 2, 2012 it was announced that WildCat would be removed before opening day to expand Celebration Plaza and bleachers were added in its spot. A new concession area with patio seating was built on the left side of the control booth. During the show, a portion of the patio was blocked off as a V.I.P. seating area known as the Pepsi Fan Zone. In addition, a beer garden was added behind the control booth, to the left of the bleachers.

During the day, Luminosity performers did flash mobs, that gave visitors a glimpse of the show. The stage for Luminosity is also used for a Peanuts show called Peanuts' Celebration at the Point. Carly Rae Jepsen held a concert on the Luminosity stage on July 7, 2012. It was free with admission and was the first concert on the stage. The stage was also used during HalloWeekends for a show called Skeleton Crew.

Luminosity started at 9:00 pm every night and initially ran for 40 minutes in 2012, but was cut to 25 minutes in 2013 until its last performance in 2017. It featured 25 dancers, 2 male and 2 female singers, 3 drummers, 2 cirque dancers and 2 DJs. In the middle of the midway, dancers were raised above the crowd. Iron Dragon was closed during the show. The show was included free with admission. Several types of older and latest hit music were used in the show. Older songs were given a modern remix with a pop/rock arrangement. Guests were able to send text messages after the show requesting songs from the DJ's playlist. About 20 songs were used in the show to blend in each segment of the show.

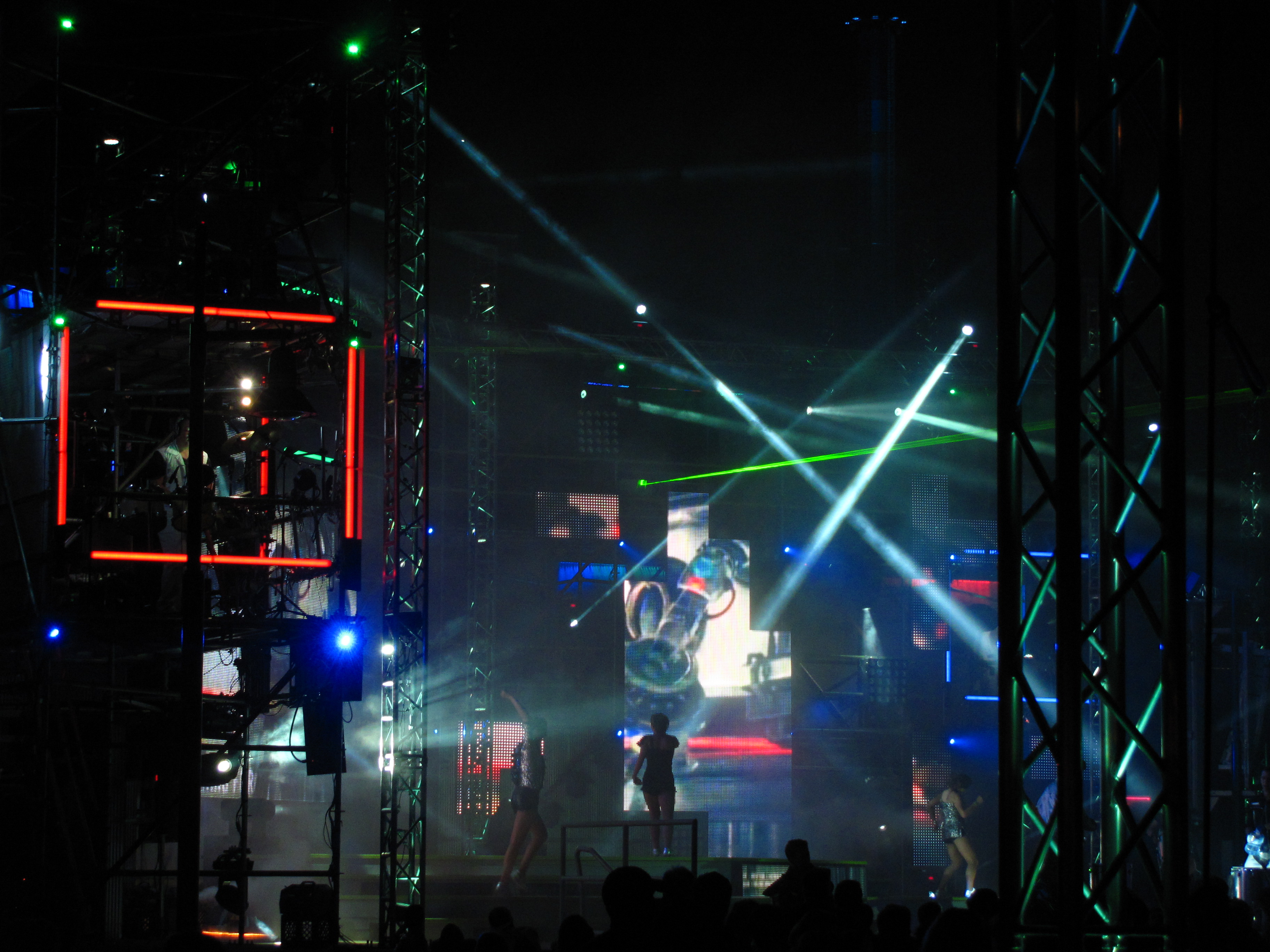
View of Luminosity from the left side of the stage

Just prior to the start of the show, a clock counted down from 1 minute to the kick-off. Music, similar to that in the show, was piped in. The stage was covered in fog. A welcome announcement played leading into the performers' stage entrances.

Before the show ended, the DJ started to rise from the front-middle of the stage. Before quietly exiting, the performers used water drums. The show concluded with fireworks and pyrotechnics over the stage, with dance music playing and people could text shout-outs that appeared on the screens. Another DJ works from the balcony of the Ballroom in the Coliseum along the main midway.

== Reception ==
Luminosity — Ignite the Night! had mostly received positive reviews from the general public and enthusiasts. James Koehl from Theme Park Insider described it as "The kind of show that you can watch over and over from different vantage points and see a different show every time." Jeff Putz, co-creator of PointBuzz and creator of CoasterBuzz said "Luminosity succeeds in keeping the energy of the park's guests very high until the moment they leave." Putz along with others criticized the show as too long and having inconsistent singers.

Amusement Today award RWS the Golden Ticket Award for Supplier of the Year for its role in Luminosity. They were awarded the award for their "high-octane energy and drive that made the vision of Luminosity at Cedar Point a huge show success". Other parks such as Six Flags Great America and Darien Lake added a similar show in 2013 as a result of the popularity of Cedar Point's Luminosity. Cedar Fair's Former CEO, Matt Ouimet, had said that if the show was successful, the chain would look into expanding it to more of their parks. In an interview with Putz in January 2013, Ouimet labeled the show as an "A" but would give it an "A+" with a few changes in the 2013 season.

== See also ==
- 2012 in amusement parks
- ElecTRONica
- IgNight – Grand Finale
