= Glow in the Park Parade =

Former parade at Six Flags parks

Six Flags México
- Status: Operating
- Opening date: March 14, 2008

Six Flags Great America
- Status: Closed
- Opening date: 2010
- Closing date: 2012
- Replaced: Bugs Bunny Starlight Spectacular
- Replaced by: igNIGHT - Grand Finale

Six Flags Great Adventure
- Status: Closed
- Opening date: May 26, 2008
- Closing date: 2010

Six Flags New England
- Status: Closed
- Opening date: 2008
- Closing date: 2010

Six Flags Over Texas
- Status: Closed
- Opening date: 2009
- Closing date: 2010

Six Flags St. Louis
- Status: Closed
- Opening date: 2009
- Closing date: 2010

Ride statistics
- Attraction type: Parade
- Music: Let it Shine

The Glow in the Park Parade is a parade that takes place every night during the summer months at Six Flags Mexico, and formerly at other Six Flags parks.

== History ==
Six Flags teamed up with The Goddard Group to create a nighttime parade at several of their parks. The Glow in the Park Parade started at three parks in 2008: Six Flags Great Adventure, Six Flags México, and Six Flags New England. The parade at each park ran from late May to early September each year. During the parade, the theme park lights would dim to increase the visibility of the illuminated floats. The parade featured drummers, puppeteers, dancers, and kinetic stilt walkers. Various Looney Tunes characters, DC Comics characters, Scooby-Doo, and Mr. Six were among the characters that appeared in the parade.

In 2009, the parade was added in two more parks, Six Flags Over Texas and Six Flags St. Louis. In 2010, Six Flags Great America added the parade.

In late 2010, Six Flags began to remove licensed theming from its parks' attractions. While terminating the licenses from attractions, they also terminated the parade at four of their parks. Great America removed the parade in 2012, leaving Six Flags Mexico the only park where the parade still performs, mainly for seasonal events.

Since 2015, the parade is shown at Six Flags Mexico's Christmas in the Park event, and so the parade's name changed to Christmas Light Parade, with a christmassy soundtrack replacing Let it Shine. A temporary float sponsored by Netflix's The Christmas Chronicles also appeared at the end of the parade in 2018.

== Locations ==
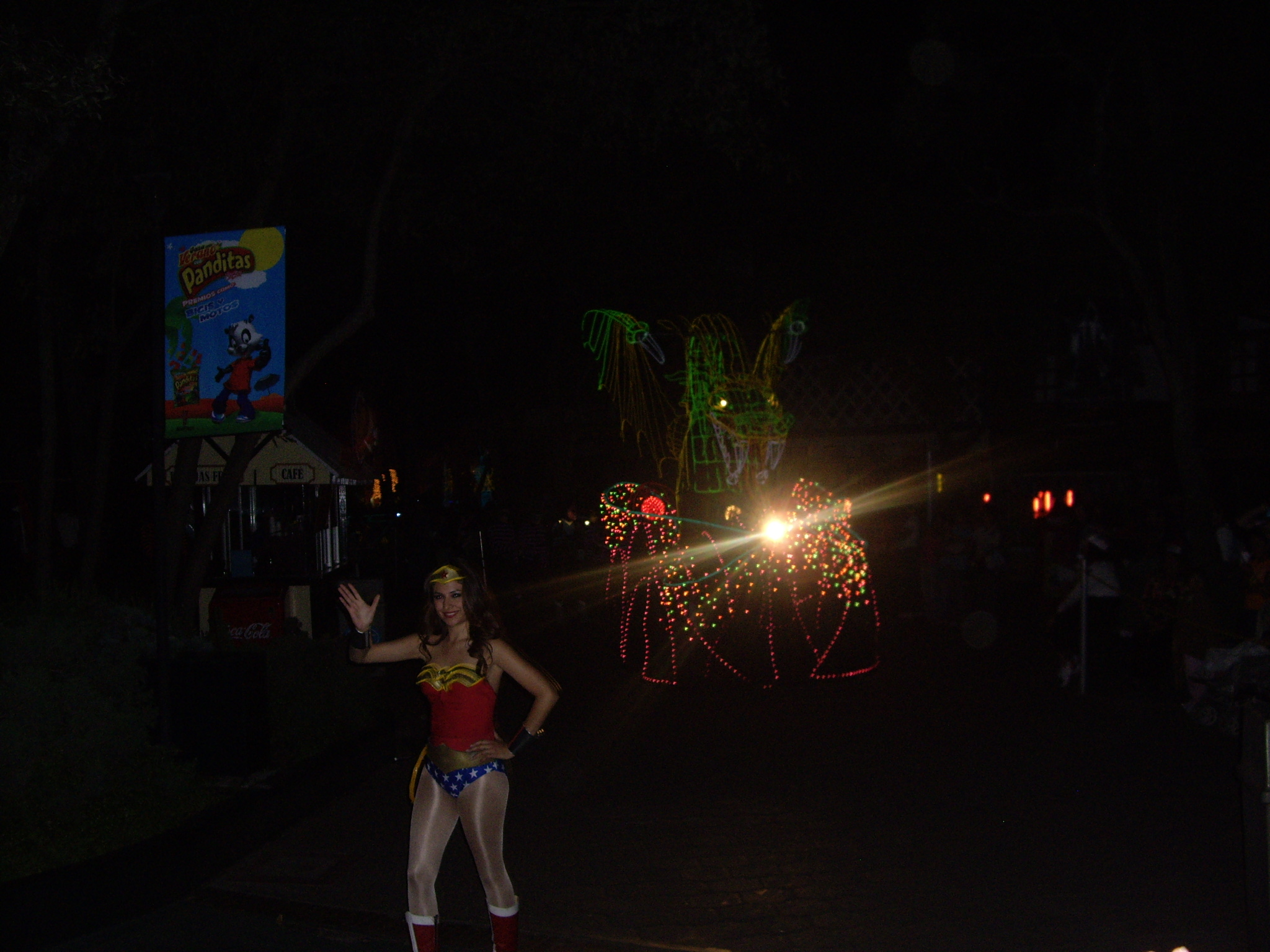
Magic Light Parade at Six Flags México

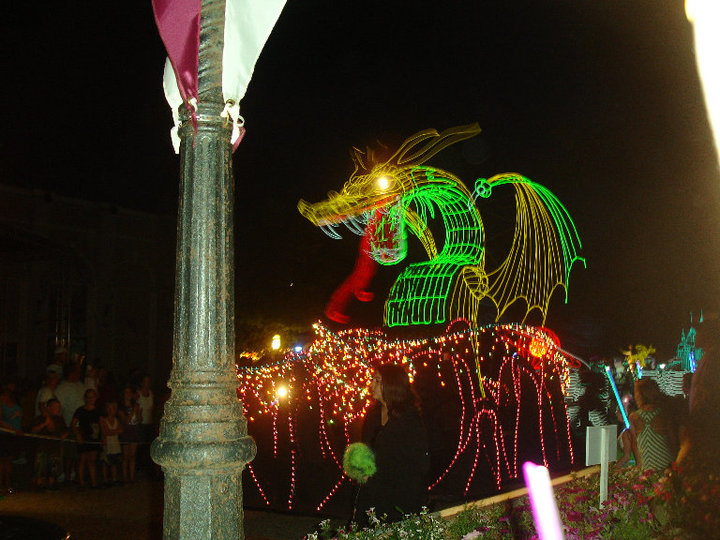
Glow in the Park Parade at Six Flags St. Louis

Location	First season	Last season	Notes
Six Flags Great America	2010	2012	
Six Flags Great Adventure	2008	2010	
Six Flags New England	2008	2010	The parade did not run during the 2009 season.
Six Flags México	2008	2021	Known as Magic Light Parade, operates seasonally
Six Flags Over Texas	2009	2010	
Six Flags St. Louis	2009	2010	

== Floats ==
The parade featured 5 main floats, alongside 2 smaller floats.

== Music ==
The song "Let it Shine" that serves as a soundtrack for the parade was composed by Benoît Jutras, with lyrics by Marcy Heisler. A Spanish-language version of the song is used for the Six Flags Mexico version.
