= Haichang Polar Ocean World =

Marine mammal park

Haichang Polar Ocean World is a marine mammal park in Chengdu, China and its address is No. 2039 South Section of Tianfu Avenue, Huayang Town, Chengdu, China. It is similar to America's SeaWorld.

== Description ==
The park offers many animal shows, including a sea lion show and a dolphin show, as well as exhibits on walruses, polar bear, beluga whales and various other marine life. The park opened in 2010 and covers 70,000 square meters. Following an expansion in 2013, a 4-D movie theater was built. People usually spend around 4 hours at the park.
