= Gary Goddard =

American producer and director

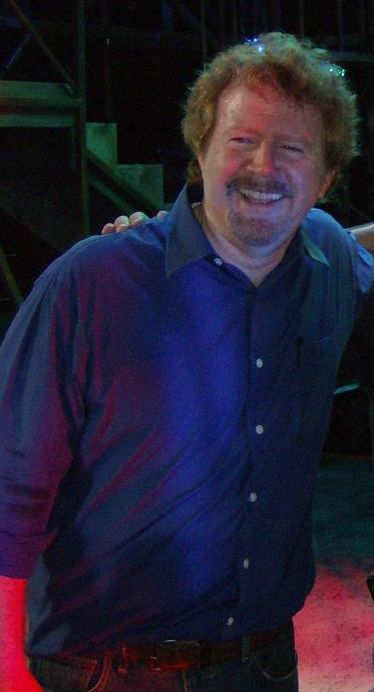
- Goddard in 2006
- Born: July 18, 1954 (age 72); Blythe, California, U.S.
- Occupations: Producer; director

Gary Goddard (born July 18, 1954) is an American producer and director who co-founded the Landmark Entertainment Group. In 2002, he left it to form Gary Goddard Entertainment (GGE), later known as the Goddard Group, an entertainment design firm based in North Hollywood, Los Angeles, California. The firm reorganized, changed ownership, and was rebranded Legacy Entertainment in 2018 after Goddard left the company following accusations of sexual assault.

== Arts career ==
=== Theater ===
Goddard has produced several shows on and off-Broadway, including the 2009 revival of Hair (Tony Award winner, Best Revival of a Musical), Neil LaBute's reasons to be pretty (Tony Award nominee, Best Play), Jekyll & Hyde, Jesus Christ Superstar (one-night concert event), The Wiz at Encores!, among others.

=== Film ===
Goddard directed the 1987 movie Masters of the Universe.

Goddard had developed Broadway 4D, a proposed American musical film to be written and directed by Goddard with Bryan Singer. Produced by Nigel Wright and Bad Hat Harry Productions, the film was in 2014 expected to star Christina Aguilera, Hugh Jackman, Matthew Morrison, Harvey Fierstein, Lea Salonga, and George Katt. It was to be shot in Brooklyn, New York City with a budget of $60 million to $90 million.

=== Television ===
Goddard has created several television shows, including Captain Power, Mega Babies, and Skeleton Warriors.

== Entertainment designer ==
Goddard co-founded Landmark Entertainment Group in Los Angeles, California, in 1980. The firm designs theme parks, live entertainment and other visitor attractions, in the United States and other countries. In 2002, he left Landmark and formed the Goddard Group design firm, which was rebranded Legacy Entertainment after he left the company in 2018.

== Sexual assault allegations ==
Brian Claflin, an aspiring artist and fashion designer from Salt Lake City, accused Goddard of a 1999 sexual assault at his Beverly Hills residence; Claflin died by suicide in Berlin in 2014 after having shared his accusations with a law firm and his father.

In April 2014, Goddard and frequent film collaborator Bryan Singer, along with several other filmmakers, were sued by actor Michael Egan III, who alleged that they had sexually assaulted him when he was a minor and had videotaped some of the assaults. Egan withdrew his lawsuit against Goddard in June 2014. By August of that year, he had dropped his lawsuits against the other defendants as well.

On November 10, 2017, actor Anthony Edwards wrote an essay on Medium in which he alleged Goddard molested him and raped his best friend "for years", starting when they were 12 years old. Goddard's publicist denied the allegations.

== Filmography ==
- Monster Plantation (dark ride)
- Jurassic Park: The Ride (dark ride)
- T2 3-D: Battle Across Time (3D film)
- The Amazing Adventures of Spider-Man (dark ride)
- Hershey's Really Big 3D Show (3D film)
- Deepo's Undersea 3D Wondershow (3D film)
- Tarzan the Ape Man (co-writer)
- Masters of the Universe (director)
