= Lists of fictional animals =

This is a list of lists of notable fictional animals.

== Lists by biological category ==
- Lists of fictional invertebrates

- List of fictional arthropods (insects, arachnids and crustaceans)
- List of fictional worms

- Lists of fictional vertebrates

- List of fictional fish
- List of fictional frogs and toads
- List of fictional reptiles

- List of fictional crocodilians
- List of fictional dinosaurs and pterosaurs
- List of fictional snakes
- List of fictional turtles

- List of fictional birds

- List of fictional birds of prey
- List of fictional ducks
- List of fictional penguins

- Fictional mammals

- Fictional carnivorans

- List of fictional bears
- List of fictional canines (coyotes, jackals, foxes, wolves)

- List of fictional dogs

- List of fictional cats and other felines

- List of fictional big cats

- List of fictional cetaceans
- List of fictional musteloids (Musteloidea other than raccoons and badgers)

- List of fictional badgers
- List of fictional raccoons

- List of fictional pinnipeds

- List of fictional marsupials (kangaroos, wallabies, koalas, opossums, bandicoots, Tasmanian devils)
- List of fictional primates (lemurs, monkeys, chimpanzees, gorillas, orangutans, humans)

- Lists of characters in a fictional work (mostly people)

- List of fictional rabbits and hares
- List of fictional rodents (mice, rats, beavers, squirrels, porcupines, etc.)
- List of fictional ungulates (cattle, sheep, goats, donkeys, zebras, deer, camels, giraffes, etc.)

- List of fictional elephants
- List of fictional horses
- List of fictional pigs

- List of fictional parasites
- List of miscellaneous fictional animals (mollusks, bats, hyenas, cetaceans, aardvarks, mongooses, hedgehogs, monotremes, sirenians, xenarthrans, salamanders, newts, echinoderms, jellyfish, others)

== Lists of biological category alphabetically ==
- List of fictional arthropods
- List of fictional badgers
- List of fictional bears
- List of fictional big cats
- List of fictional birds of prey
- List of fictional birds
- List of fictional canines
- List of fictional cats and other felines
- List of fictional cetaceans
- List of fictional crocodiles and alligators
- List of fictional dinosaurs
- List of fictional dogs
- List of fictional ducks
- List of fictional elephants
- List of fictional fish
- List of fictional frogs and toads
- List of fictional horses
- List of fictional miscellaneous animals
- List of fictional marsupials
- List of fictional musteloids
- List of fictional parasites
- List of fictional penguins
- List of fictional pigs
- List of fictional pinnipeds
- List of fictional primates
- List of fictional rabbits and hares
- List of fictional raccoons
- List of fictional reptiles
- List of fictional rodents
- List of fictional snakes
- List of fictional turtles
- List of fictional ungulates
- List of fictional wolves
- List of fictional worms

== Lists by features ==
- Kaiju
- List of animal superheroes

== Lists by fictional work ==
- List of A Bug's Life characters
- List of characters in the Ice Age films
- List of Littlest Pet Shop (2012 TV series) characters
- List of My Little Pony: Friendship is Magic characters
- List of Star Wars creatures
- List of Who Framed Roger Rabbit characters

== See also ==
- Lists of fictional species
- List of fictional extraterrestrials
