= List of fictional invertebrates =

This is a list of fictional invertebrates.

== Arthropods ==
- List of fictional arthropods (insects, arachnids and crustaceans)

== Echinoderms (starfish, sea urchins, sea cucumbers, etc.) ==
- Patrick Star, a starfish from the animated series SpongeBob SquarePants

== Mollusks ==
=== Cephalopods (octopuses, squids) ===
- Henry, an octopus from The Wiggles
- Inklings and Octolings, fictional species based on squids and octopuses respectively from Splatoon
- Oswald, the protagonist from the animated series with the same name
- Squiddly Diddly, an animated squid from The Atom Ant/Secret Squirrel Show
- Squidward Tentacles, an octopus from the animated series SpongeBob SquarePants
- Squilliam Fancyson, an octopus from SpongeBob SquarePants

=== Snails and slugs ===
- Escargoon, a snail from Kirby: Right Back at Ya!
- Gary the Snail, a sea snail from SpongeBob SquarePants
- Marcel, title character in the film Marcel the Shell with Shoes On
- Nana Connie, Marcel's Italian grandmother in Marcel the Shell with Shoes On
- Peek a Boo, a snail from Suzy's Zoo
- Sid the Slug
- Snail, a snail from Franklin
- Turbo, the protagonist of Turbo

== Parazoa ==
- SpongeBob SquarePants, a sponge whose the protagonist from the animated series with the same name

== Annelids (including earthworms) ==
- Earthworm Jim, the protagonist of the video game series with the same name
  - Earthworm Kim, the female version of Jim from Earthworm Jim 3D
  - Evil Jim, Earthworm Jim's evil Doppelgänger from the Earthworm Jim TV series
- Lowly Worm, a friendly worm created by Richard Scarry, as a main character in the animated series The Busy World of Richard Scarry
- Mister Mind is a fictional worm supervillain appearing in American comic books published by DC Comics who was created by Otto Binder and C. C. Beck for Fawcett Comics

== See also ==
- Lists of fictional animals
- List of miscellaneous fictional animals
- List of fictional parasites
- List of fictional worms
- Lists of fictional species
- Talking animals in fiction
