= List of fictional foxes =

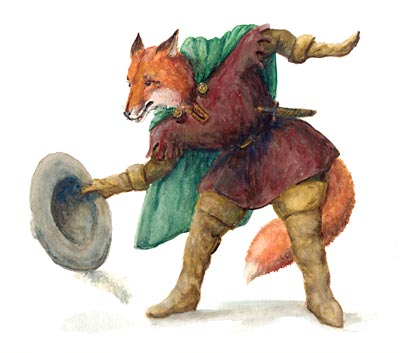
Reineke

The following is the list of fictional foxes. Fictional foxes have appeared in various artforms and media throughout centuries. This is an alphabetical list by medium.

== Foxes in theater ==
- Basil Brush, a puppet.
- Bystrouška, a vixen from the opera The Cunning Little Vixen by Leoš Janáček (referred to as just "Vixen" in the English translation).
- Foulfellow the Fox, from Pinocchio (1940 Disney film).
- Sebastian, a gay fox director from Meet the Feebles.
- Zlatohřbítek, a fox in the opera The Cunning Little Vixen by Leoš Janáček (referred to as just "Fox" in the English translation).

== Foxes in comics ==
- Br'er Fox in the Disney comics featuring Br'er Rabbit.
- Bystrouška, a vixen from the comic strip Vixen Sharp-ears by the opera The Cunning Little Vixen by Rudolf Těsnohlídek and Stanislav Lolek, later adapted into an opera by Leoš Janáček as The Cunning Little Vixen
- Fiona Fox, from Sonic the Hedgehog.
- Faux Pas.
- Freddy and Ferdie Fox.
- Joris Goedbloed in Tom Poes and Panda by Marten Toonder.
- Jujube in Gai-Luron by Marcel Gotlib.
- Ozy and Millie.
- Renato, from Andrea Romoli's comic strip.
- Seminole Sam in Pogo.
- Slylock Fox, a detective in Slylock Fox & Comics for Kids
- McFox (Raposão), from Lionel's Kingdom/Monica's Gang
- Vlop, title character in a Dutch comic strip by Ronald Sinoo, which was published in the wildlife magazine Wapiti.

== Foxes in animation ==
- Angelique in Rango
- Br'er Fox in Disney's Song of the South.
- Br'er Fox in Ralph Bakshi's Coonskin.
- Cajun Fox from Courage: The Cowardly Dog
- Candle Fox from Kiff
- Diane Foxington / "The Crimson Paw" in The Bad Guys
- Fagin from Saban's Adventures of Oliver Twist
- Fenneko from Aggretsuko.
- Fenton Fox from The Loud House
- Fibber Fox in Yakky Doodle.
- Finnick a fennec fox in Disney's Zootopia.
- Foulfellow the Fox, from Disney's Pinocchio.
- Fox, Vixen, Dreamer, Charmer, Friendly, Bold, Scarface, Lady Blue, Ranger, Plucky from The Animals of Farthing Wood.
- The Fox in The Fox and the Crow.
- Fox, in the Canadian children's series Franklin.
- Fox, from Skunk Fu!
- Foxy, an early Warner Bros. Animation character who looked almost exactly like Mickey Mouse. His girlfriend Roxy was also a fox and looked like Minnie Mouse.
- Freddy Fox, a character in Peppa Pig.
- Fuchsia, a secretary who has more sense than her boss, Tyrannicaus, in Animalia (TV series).
- George the fox from Of Fox and Hounds.
- Gideon Grey antagonist turned baker in Disney's Zootopia.
- Kitsune, one of four main characters in Samurai Rabbit: The Usagi Chronicles.
- Kurama, a fox demon thief who is reborn as a human in Yu Yu Hakusho.
- Kurama, the nine tailed fox that is sealed inside Naruto Uzumaki from the series Naruto.
- The little fox, whose name is a "little fox" too. Urusei Yatsura.
- Mimi LaFloo, a vixen in Bucky O'Hare.
- Muggy-Doo.
- Nanao, a tiny kitsune from Ask Dr. Rin!
- Nick Wilde in Disney's Zootopia.
- Pablo the Little Red Fox.
- Pammee in YooHoo & Friends-related series.
- Parisa, Leah's pet purple fox in the Canadian-American animated series Shimmer and Shine
- Ponchi and Conchi see also List of fictional raccoons from Shaman King...
- Renamon and Kyubimon in Digimon.
- Rita, young vixen, in the Jungledyret Hugo series.
- Robin Hood and Maid Marian in Disney's Robin Hood.
- Roy Fox from Kiff
- Smirre, a fox who wants to catch and eat the wild geese in The Wonderful Adventures of Nils.
- Swifty and Jade from Arctic Dogs
- Swiper the Fox, a thief in Dora the Explorer.
- Sylvester the Fox in Terrytoons shorts.
- King Voracious, Attila, Evita, Todd, et al. in The Foxbusters.
- Tod and Vixey from Disney's The Fox and the Hound (Tod is also in The Fox and the Hound 2).
- Zorori in Kaiketsu Zorori.
- Queen Beelzebub in Helluva Boss.
- Fink in The Wild Robot.

== Mythological and folklore foxes ==
- Kitsune – fox spirits the strongest being a nine-tailed fox (Japanese mythology).
- Kudagitsune – in Japanese mythology.
- Kumiho – in Korean mythology.
- Kuzunoha in Japanese Mythology.
- Huli jing in Chinese Mythology.
- Tamamo-no-Mae in Japanese Mythology.
- Teumessian fox in Greek mythology.
- Youko fox demons in Japanese mythology.
- Foxes in several Greek fables, including:
  - The Fox and the Grapes
  - The Fox and the Crow
  - The Fox and the Stork
  - The Wild Boar and the Fox
  - The Fox and the Sick Lion
  - The Fox and the Mask
  - The Fox and the Woodman
  - The Fox and the Lion
  - The Lion, the Bear and the Fox
  - The Fox and the Weasel

== Foxes in literature ==
- Br'er Fox from the Uncle Remus stories by Joel Chandler Harris.
- Fox, Vixen, Dreamer, Charmer, Friendly, Bold, Scarface, Lady Blue, Ranger, Plucky (and more) from The Animals of Farthing Wood.
- J.C., in the Catfish Bend series by Ben Lucien Burman.
- Mr. Tod from the book The Tale of Mr. Tod by Beatrix Potter.
- Reddy Fox, in the stories of Thornton Burgess.
- Reynard the Fox in the Reynard cycle.
- Scarlett Fox, from the magazine Ranger Rick.
- The Tod, from The Plague Dogs

== Foxes in film and television ==
- Bravo Fox, from Zoobilee Zoo.
- Lotta Fox, from Carl the Collector.
- Br'er Fox in Disney's Song of the South.
- Br'er Fox in Ralph Bakshi's Coonskin.
- Dr. Fox, from Unikitty!.
- Dr. Molar, Lake Hoohaw’s resident dentist from PB&J Otter.
- Finnick, Nick Wilde's partner in crime from Zootopia.
- Fox, Vixen, Dreamer, Charmer, Friendly, Bold, Scarface, Lady Blue, Ranger, Plucky (and more) from The Animals of Farthing Wood.
- Mr. Fox in Fantastic Mr. Fox, based on Roald Dahl's eponymous children's book.
- Swiper, from Dora the Explorer
- Foulfellow the Fox from Disney's Pinocchio.
- Freddy Fox, one of Peppa’s friends from Peppa Pig.
- Lowieke de Vos in De Fabeltjeskrant.
- Nelson and Vince, from Mongrels.
- Nick Wilde in Disney's Zootopia.
- Parisa, Leah’s pet purple fox in Shimmer and Shine.
- Robin Hood and Maid Marian in Disney's Robin Hood.
- Rita, red fox, in the Jungledyret Hugo animated series.
- Shippo, a young fox demon in Inuyasha.
- Tod from Disney's The Fox and the Hound and The Fox and the Hound 2.
- Vuk from Vuk, based on the eponymous novel by István Fekete.
- Fink in The Wild Robot.

== Foxes in music ==
- Mr. Fox, a 1970s folk rock band.
- "The Fox (What Does the Fox Say?)", a song by Norwegian comedy duo Ylvis.
- The foxes in "I Know Places" by Taylor Swift.

== Foxes in video games ==
- Benjamin, a sly male fox in Little Misfortune.
- Bō, a male fox and player character in Bō: Path of the Teal Lotus.
- Carmelita Fox, a female fox in Sly Cooper.
- Corrine in Tales of Symphonia.
- Crazy Redd, the Black Market salesman from the Animal Crossing games.
- Eun, a nine-tailed fox spirit that helps Ara, a female playable character in Elsword.
- Fennix, an anthropomorphic male fox in Fortnite and Volpez's older brother.
- Fox McCloud and Krystal in the Star Fox series.
- Foxy the Pirate and Mangle from the Five Nights at Freddy's series.
- Foxy Roxy, a lycra-wearing vixen in Brutal: Paws of Fury.
- Glitch, an elite agent and one of three playable main protagonists in Anomaly Collapse.
- Greggory "Gregg" Lee, one of four main characters in Night in the Woods.
- Kingsley, the head character in Kingsley's Adventure.
- Kitsune (Fox) in Persona 4, who is part of the social links.
- Lucky, the main character of Super Lucky's Tale.
- Ninetails, a major boss character from the game Ōkami. Its source of power is the Fox Rods, which contain nine Tube Foxes, one for each tail. During battle with Ninetails, the tails turn into women and must be defeated individually. This character's name is spelled differently than Ninetales.
- Pretztail in Viva Piñata. Pretztails is a fox piñata.
- Psycho Fox, the main character in a Master System game of the same name.
- Ran Yakumo, a boss in Perfect Cherry Blossom.
- Reynardo, the player character of Stories: The Path of Destinies.
- Rif and his girlfriend in the computer game Inherit the Earth: Quest for the Orb.
- Snipe, a hybrid fox/paradise of bird in Crash of the Titans.
- Spy Fox, the title character of a computer game series by Humongous Entertainment.
- Miles "Tails" Prower, in Sonic the Hedgehog.
- Tighnari, a fennec fox humanoid in Genshin Impact.
- Taiqing, a Beastling fox priest and one of three playable main protagonists in Threefold Recital.
- Titus, the titular fox protagonist in Titus the Fox: To Marrakech and Back.
- Volpez, an anthropomorphic male fox in Fortnite and Fennix's younger brother.
- Vulpix, Ninetales, Fennekin, Braixen, Delphox, Nickit, Thievul, and Zorua and Zoroark in Pokémon. Although Vulpix, Ninetales and Zoroark, are based on Kitsune.
- Bonnie Anne, a female NPC in Pirate101.
- Fox/Kitsune spirit. It can be summoned by Kiriko, a female playable character in Overwatch.

== Foxes as toys, mascots, and others ==
- Necky the Fox – The mascot of Famitsu magazine.
- Filbert Fox - The mascot of Leicester City Football club

== See also ==
- Category:Fictional foxes
- List of fictional animals
