= Lists of animals =

List of animals

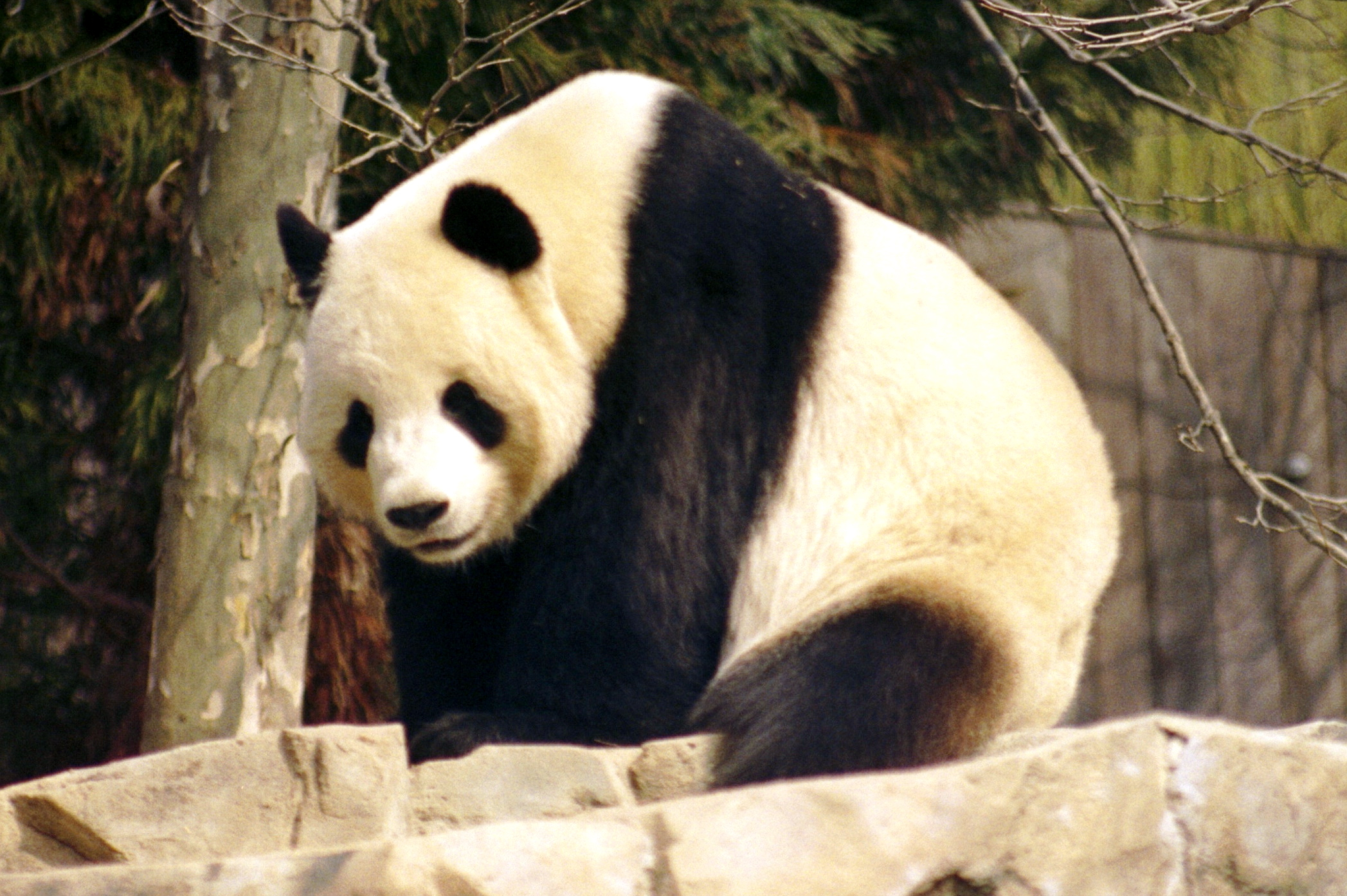
The giant panda is a vulnerable species

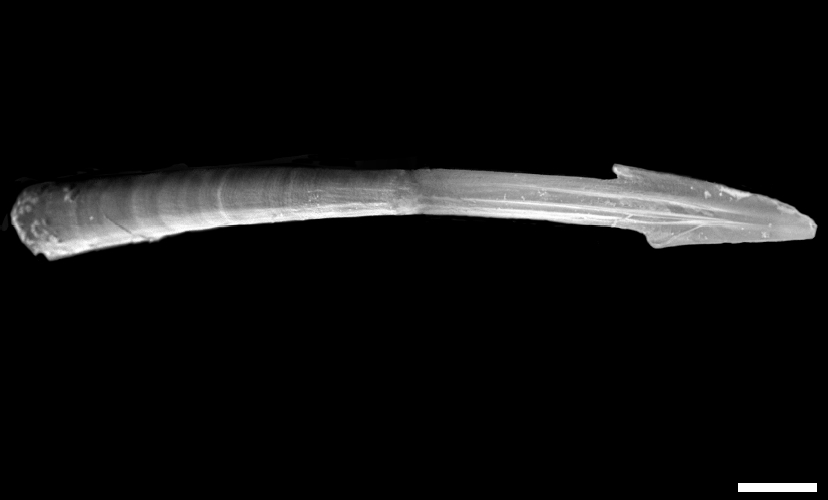
The use of love darts by the land snail Monachoides vicinus is a form of sexual selection

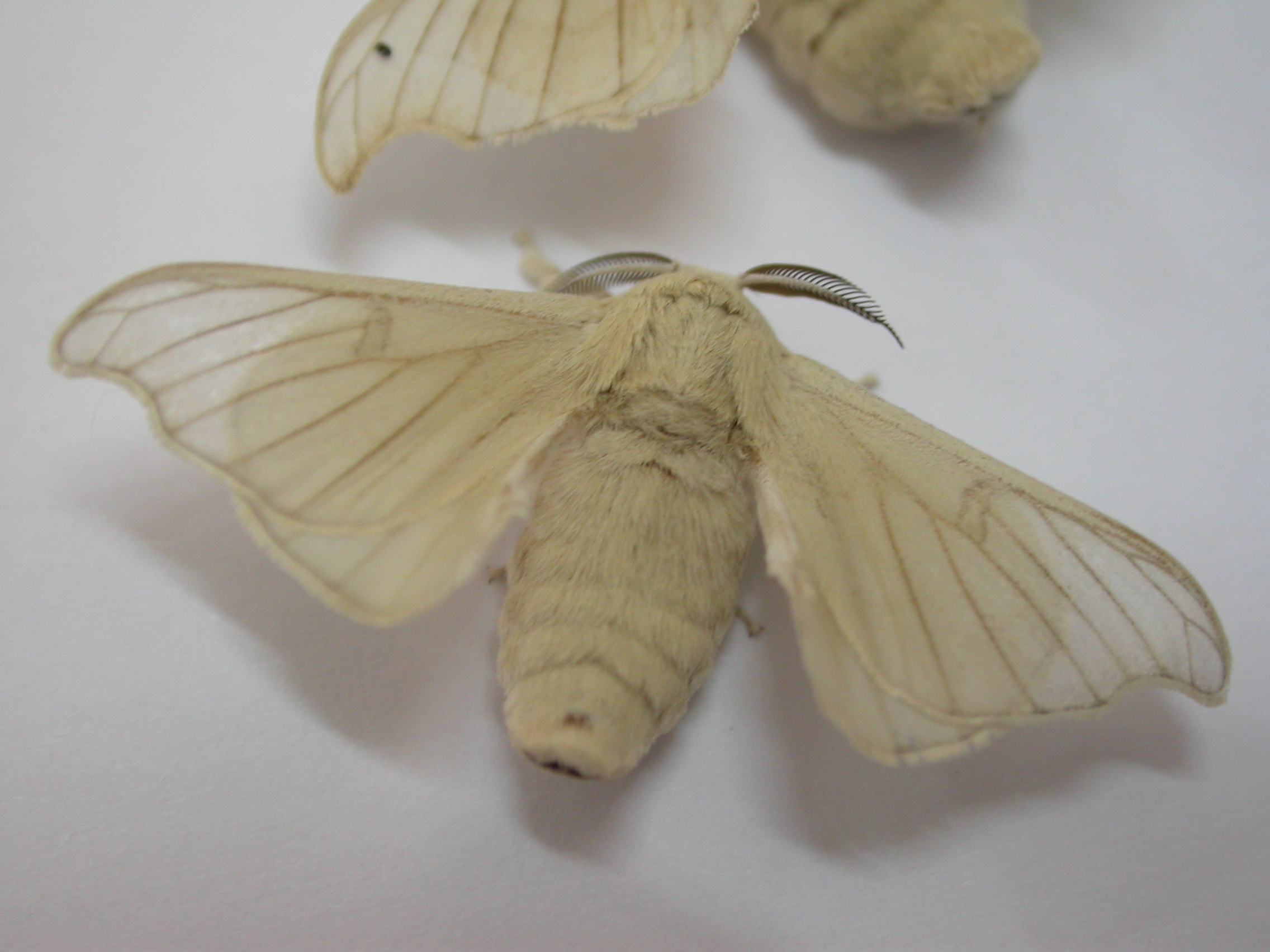
Adult silk worm

Animals are multicellular eukaryotic organisms in the biological kingdom Animalia. With few exceptions, animals consume organic material, breathe oxygen, are able to move, reproduce sexually, and grow from a hollow sphere of cells, the blastula, during embryonic development. Over 1.5 million living animal species have been described—of which around 1 million are insects—but it has been estimated there are over 7 million in total. Animals range in size from 8.5 millionths of a metre to 33.6 metres (110 ft) long and have complex interactions with each other and their environments, forming intricate food webs. The study of animals is called zoology.

Animals may be listed or indexed by many criteria, including taxonomy, status as endangered species, their geographical location, and their portrayal and/or naming in human culture.

== By common name ==
- List of animal names (male, female, young, and group)

== By aspect ==
- List of common household pests
- List of animal sounds
- List of animals by number of legs
- List of animals by number of neurons
- Largest and heaviest animals
- List of animals named after other animals

=== By domestication ===
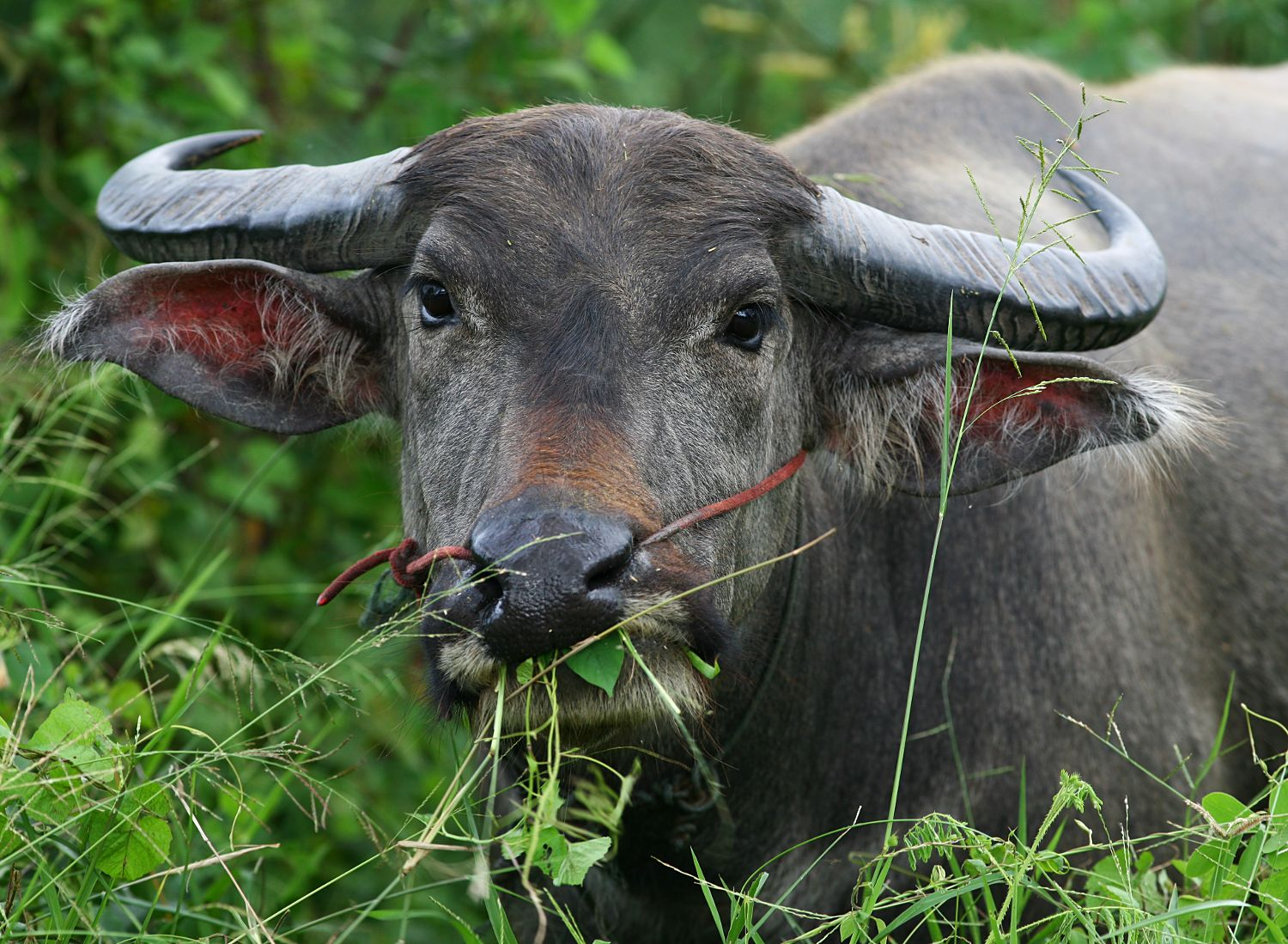
Water buffalo

- List of domesticated animals

=== By eating behaviour ===
- List of herbivorous animals
- List of omnivores
- List of carnivores

=== By endangered status ===
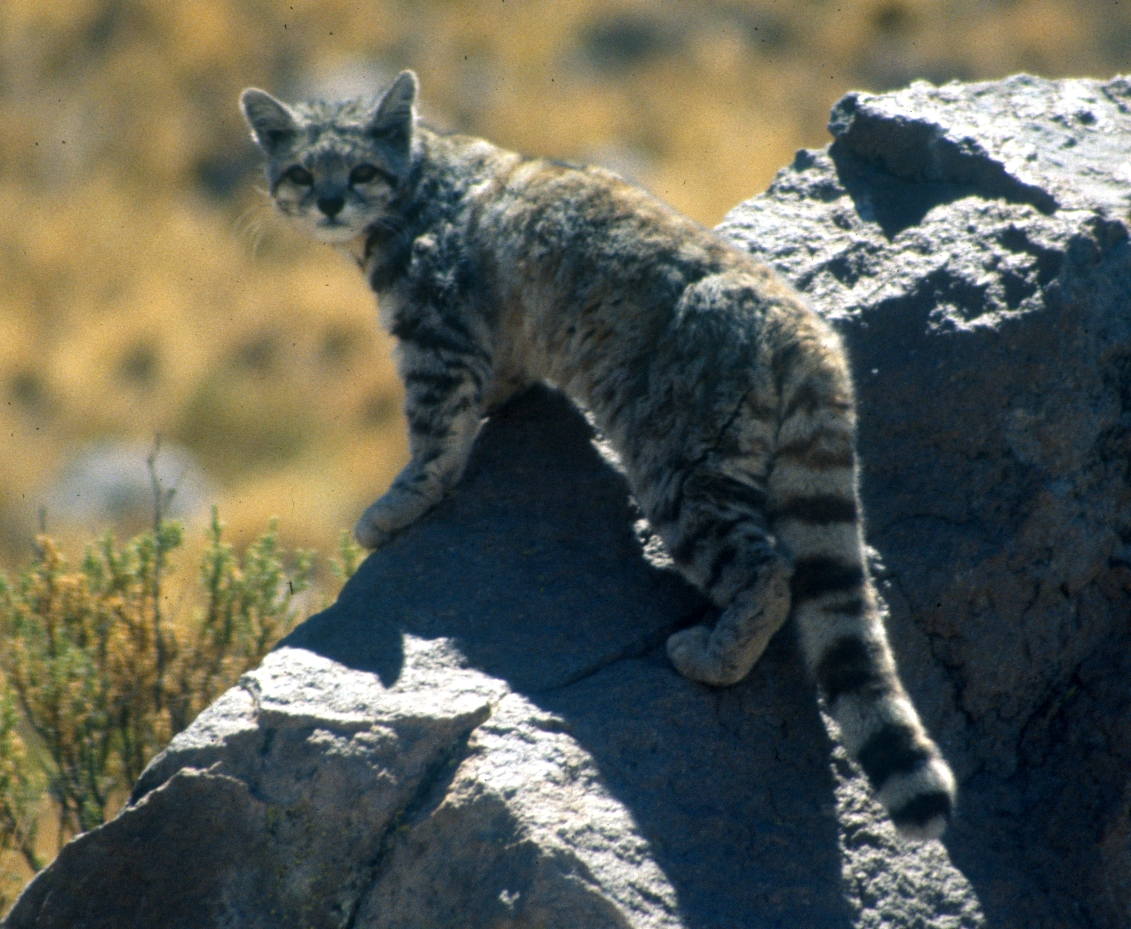
The Andean mountain cat is an endangered species.

- IUCN Red List endangered species (Animalia)
  - United States Fish and Wildlife Service list of endangered species

=== By extinction ===
List of extinct animals

- List of extinct birds
- List of extinct mammals
  - List of extinct cetaceans
- List of extinct butterflies

=== By region ===
- Lists of amphibians by region
- Lists of birds by region
- Lists of mammals by region
- Lists of reptiles by region

== By individual (real or fictional) ==
=== Real ===
- List of individual apes
- List of individual bears
  - List of giant pandas
- List of individual birds
- List of individual bovines
- List of individual cats
  - List of longest-living cats
- List of individual cetaceans
  - List of captive orcas
- List of individual dogs
  - List of longest-living dogs
- List of individual elephants
- List of individual hippopotamids
- List of historical horses
  - List of leading Thoroughbred racehorses
  - List of racehorses
- List of giant squids
- List of individual monkeys
- List of individual pigs
- List of individual seals and sea lions
- List of wealthiest animals
- List of wolves

=== Fictional ===
- List of fictional arthropods
- List of fictional bears
- List of fictional birds
  - List of fictional penguins
- List of fictional dogs
  - List of fictional wolves
- List of fictional felines
  - List of fictional big cats
- List of fictional frogs and toads
- List of fictional horses
- List of fictional pachyderms
- List of fictional pigs
- List of fictional primates
- List of fictional snakes
- List of fictional turtles
- List of fictional worms

== By taxonomical classification ==
=== Phyla ===
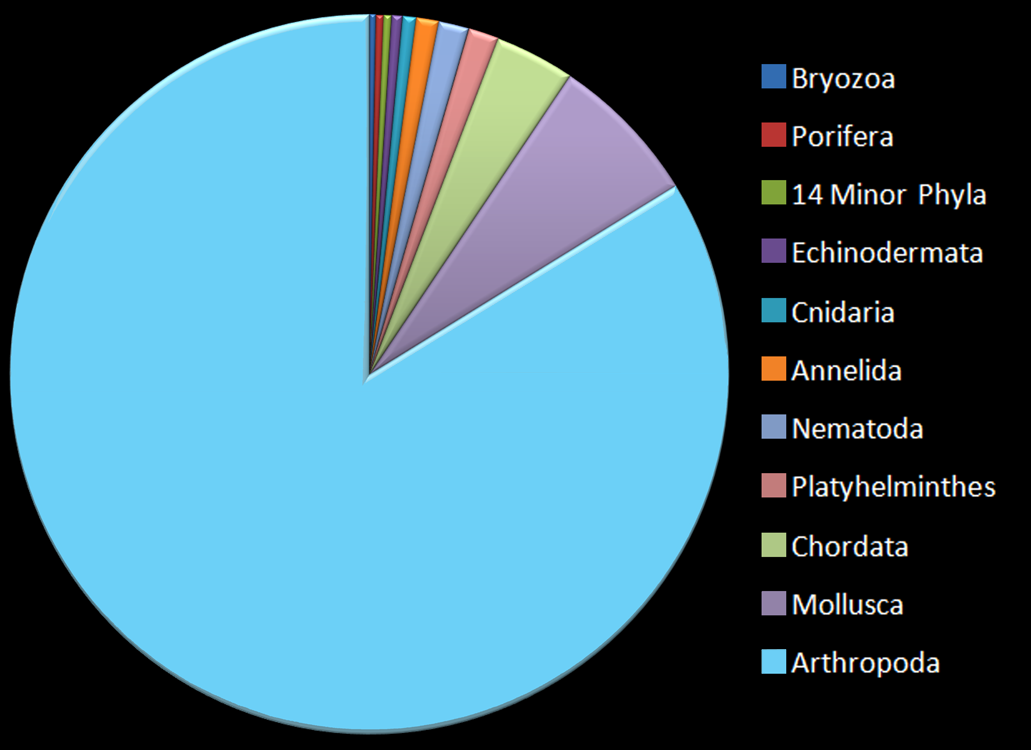
The relative number of species contributed to the total by each phylum of animals

The animal Kingdom contains some 35 extant phyla.

Basal animals are delineated according to the following cladogram:

- Choanozoa (950)
  - Choanoflagellata
  - Animal (760)
    - Porifera
    - Eumetazoa
      - Ctenophora
      - ParaHoxozoa
        - - Placozoa
          - Cnidaria
        - Bilateria
          - Xenacoelomorpha
          - Nephrozoa

Animals: Porifera, Diploblasts

Diploblasts: Ctenophora, ParaHoxozoa

ParaHoxozoa: Placozoa, Cnidaria, Bilateria/Triploblast

Bilateria: Xenacoelomorpha, Nephrozoa

Nephrozoa: Protostomes, Deuterostomes

- Phylum Proarticulata† Disputed if this is in or out of Bilateria and Phylum Xenacoelomorpha is basal

==== Superphylum Deuterostomia ====
- Phylum Chordata
- Ambulacraria
  - Phylum Hemichordata
  - Phylum Echinodermata
  - Phylum Cambroernida†

==== Protostomia ====
===== Superphylum Ecdysozoa =====
- Phylum Saccorhytida?†
- Cycloneuralia
  - Scalidophora
    - Phylum Kinorhyncha
    - Phylum Loricifera
    - Phylum Priapulida
  - Nematoida
    - Phylum Nematoda
    - Phylum Nematomorpha
- Panarthropoda
  - Phylum Onychophora
  - Tactopoda
    - Phylum Tardigrada
    - Phylum Arthropoda

===== Spiralia =====
- Gnathifera
  - Phylum Gnathostomulida
  - Phylum Rotifera
- Mesozoa
  - Phylum Dicyemida
  - Phylum Orthonectida
- Rouphozoa
  - Phylum Gastrotricha
  - Phylum Platyhelminthes
- Superphylum Lophotrochozoa
  - Phylum Hyolitha†
  - Phylum Annelida
  - Phylum Brachiopoda
  - Phylum Bryozoa
  - Phylum Cycliophora
  - Phylum Entoprocta
  - Phylum Mollusca
  - Phylum Nemertea
  - Phylum Phoronida

=== Chordata ===
- List of chordate orders

==== Fish ====
- List of fish families
- List of fish common names

==== Amphibians ====
- List of amphibians

==== Reptiles ====
- List of reptiles
- List of ichthyosaur genera
- List of pterosaur genera
- List of plesiosaur genera
- List of dinosaur genera
- List of snakes
- List of snake genera
- List of boine species and subspecies
- List of erycine species and subspecies
- List of pythonid species and subspecies
- List of tropidophiid species and subspecies
- List of uropeltid species and subspecies
- List of crotaline species and subspecies
- List of viperine species and subspecies
- List of anomalepidid species and subspecies
- List of leptotyphlopid species and subspecies
- List of typhlopid species and subspecies
- List of Testudines families (tortoises, turtles and terrapins)
