= List of fictional canines =

This list of fictional canines is subsidiary to the lists of fictional animals and is a collection of various notable canine characters that appear in various works of fiction. It is limited to well-referenced examples of canines. These lists are for all canines except dogs, including coyotes, jackals, foxes, and wolves. Hyenas are not canines. Fantasy beasts like Werewolves are excluded. Dogs can be found in List of fictional dogs. Wolves can be found in List of fictional wolves. Foxes can be found in List of fictional foxes.

== Literature ==
Name	Type	Work	Author	Notes
Rip and Snort	Coyote	Hank the Cowdog	John R. Erickson	
Mr. Fox	Fox	Fantastic Mr. Fox	Roald Dahl	A fox with a wife and four cubs who steals livestock from three nasty farmers to survive.
Mr. Tod	Fox	The Tale of Mr. Tod	Beatrix Potter	Owns two houses and in one of them he gets into a scuffle with an intruding Tommy Brock.
Reynard the Fox	Fox	Van den vos Reynaerde	Willem die Madoc maecte	
Slagar the Cruel	Fox	Redwall	Brian Jacques	A fox whose face is disfigured and runs a band of slavers.
Tabaqui	Jackal	The Jungle Book	Rudyard Kipling	

== Comics ==
Name	Species	Comic	Format	Creator	Notes
Ferdinand Fox	Fox	Coo Coo Comics	Comic books	Alexander Samalman	A genius fox who teaches the forest animals high IQ tricks.
Fiona Fox	Fox	Sonic the Hedgehog	Comic books		A treasure hunter and Scourge the Hedgehog's love interest.
Fix and Foxi	Fox	Fix and Foxi	Comic books	Rolf Kauka	
Foxy Fagan	Fox	Foxy Fagan	Comic books	Harvey Eisenberg	A trouble prone fox who is sly but things do not work out as he plans.
Freddy Fox	Fox	Bobby Bear	Comic strip	Kitsie Bridges, Dora McLaren, Meg, Wilfred Haughton	
Slylock Fox	Fox	Slylock Fox & Comics for Kids	Comic strips	Bob Weber Jr.	A detective, constantly matching wits against a variety of criminals and assisted by his sidekick Max Mouse.
Foxy	Fox	The Dandy	Comic strips	Evi de Bono	
Joris Goedbloed	Fox	Tom Poes, Panda	Comic strips	Marten Toonder	Despite his last name ("Goedbloed" would translate as "Good blood" in English) Joris is an untrustworthy con-artist who uses Macaronic Latin.
Jujube	Fox	Nanar, Jujube & Piette, Gai-Luron	Comic books	Marcel Gotlib	Jujube was originally the main character in a comic strip named Nanar, Jujube & Piette (1962–1965), but was eventually upstaged by a side character, Gai-Luron the dog, who became the main character of the series instead. It was also retitled Gai-Luron and now Jujube became Gai-Luron's sidekick.
McFox (Raposão)	Fox	Lionel's Kingdom	Comic books	Mauricio de Sousa	The original main character in Lionel's Kingdom comics.
Muzo	Fox	Placid et Muzo	Comic strips	José Cabrero Arnal	The best friend and sidekick of Placid.
Ozy	Fox	Ozy and Millie	Web comics	Dana Simpson	
Seminole Sam	Fox	Pogo	Comic strips	Walt Kelly	
Tim	Fox	Tim und Tobby	Comic strips	Becker-Kasch	A fox who is best friends with a little bear.

== Television ==
- Wishbone, the titular book loving Jack Russell Terrier from Wishbone.

== Animation ==
=== Coyotes ===
Name	Origin	Notes
Antoine D'Coolette	Sonic the Hedgehog	
Bent-Tail the Coyote	Various Walt Disney cartoons	A brown coyote who appeared as a nemesis of Pluto in a few cartoons.
Bent-Tail Junior	Various Walt Disney cartoons	Bent-Tail's unintelligent son.
Cage E. Coyote	Baby Looney Tunes	Wile E. Coyote's father.
Calamity Coyote	Tiny Toon Adventures	Pupil to Wile E. Coyote, who targets Road Runner's pupil Little Beeper, but only half his inventions work properly.
Coyote Kid	Tiny Toon Adventures	A cowboy robber who closely resembles Wile E. Coyote. He and his gang of outlaw coyotes only appeared in the episode "High Toon".
Dag the Coyote	Barnyard	A maroon coyote who, and his pack tried to abduct farm animals, but were defeated by Otis the cow, and his friends.
Don Coyote	The Adventures of Don Coyote and Sancho Panda	A knightly coyote with a mustache, armour and a lance, who rides on his steed Dapple with his companion Sancho Panda to spread justice (but usually mayhem) wherever he travels.
Space Coyote	The Simpsons	Homer Simpson's spirit guide who only appeared in the episode "El Viaje Misterioso de Nuestro Jomer (The Mysterious Voyage of Homer)".
Tech E. Coyote	Loonatics Unleashed	Descendant of Wile E. Coyote, who has Rev Runner as his technical assistant.
Tommy the Coyote	Father of the Pride	
Troyo	Elena of Avalor	An evil magical coyote who tricked people into doing bad stuff for him so he could be King of the Jungle.
Wile E. Coyote	Looney Tunes	A brown coyote who makes many attempts to catch his target prey Road Runner only to fail miserably.

=== Foxes ===
Name	Origin	Notes
Beat	Kaiketsu Zorori	
Brother Fox	Song of the South	Fox who tries to eat Br'er Rabbit and often collaborates with Br'er Fox to achieve this goal.
Brother Fox	Coonskin	A satirical subversion of Joel Chandler Harris and Disney's similar character from Song of the South, reimagined as an African-American.
Cajun Fox	Courage the Cowardly Dog	
Colulu and Widget	Kateikyoushi Hitman Reborn!	
Darma	Rock Dog	One of Bodi's band members from rock park.
Donbe	Dragon Ball and Dr. Slump	
Eddy	Pororo the Little Penguin	A fox that loves inventing things.
Fauntleroy Fox	The Fox and the Crow	A refined but gullible sort. Created in 1941 by Columbia Pictures.
Foxy Loxy	Chicken Little	Foxy Loxy was the star of the first Fantasies cartoons Hubley directed for producer Jam Handy. (Hubley had already helped his partner Jill Donaldson create another series, titled Fantasies, with the character Bippo The Hippo.) Foxy Loxy's first appearance on screen was in December 1963 in "Chicken Little". This old-western themed short features Chicken Little developing affection for the tavern singer who would become a Fox. Foxy Loxy and his then-nameless Chicken would appear in another cartoon that same year: "Fun On The Farm" (November 21 1957), a musical set on a Farm. The plot bares some similarities to The Fox & The Stork, by Susanna Davidson Illustrated by John Joven which Donaldson and Hubley contributed on. This also marks the first time Foxy Loxys name was mentioned.
Foulfellow	Pinocchio	In the 1940 Disney film Pinocchio, the fox and the cat are given the names "Honest" John Worthington Foulfellow (voiced by Walter Catlett) and Gideon (whose three hiccups in the film were provided by Mel Blanc). The pair differ from their original counterparts in the Collodi novel in a number of ways. They do not feign disability, and it is they who tempt Pinocchio to go to Mangiafuoco's theatre (named Stromboli in the film) and coax him into going to Pleasure Island.
Freddy Fox	Peppa Pig	One of Peppa's friends who debuted in the season 3 episode of the same name. He has a very strong nose, similar to Gaston from Ben & Holly's Little Kingdom, who is another character created by Astley Baker Davies. He is voiced by Max Miller.
King Voracious	Foxbusters	Leader of the foxes, Voracious is a large, handsome and charismatic red fox who is a somewhat unstable character. He sometimes appears to lose authority in the pack of foxes, but at the same time still leads them into constantly (and unsuccessfully) trying to get the better of the chickens.
Fox	XXXHOLiC	
Fox	Persona 4 The Animation	
Fox	Skunk Fu	
Kitsune	Folktales from Japan	
Konoha	Dog Days	
Nick Wilde	Zootopia	Character voiced by Jason Bateman.
Rita	Jungledyret	A young red fox who befriends Hugo on the streets of Copenhagen.
Mr. Fox	Adventure Time	
Robin Hood and Maid Marian	Robin Hood	
Slyly	Rudolph the Red-Nosed Reindeer: The Movie	An Arctic fox.
Sumari	Shining Tears X Wind	
Swiper	Dora the Explorer	The main antagonist of the show. He wears a dark blue mask that conceals his face and thieving gloves of the same color. Before his entrances, he can be heard twitching his whiskers. Once the viewer manages to yell his name in sight, he will jump out of his hiding place and creep towards Dora and Boots to try to swipe their stuff. He can be stopped by Dora, Boots and the viewer saying "Swiper, no swiping!" thrice, upon which after he snaps his fingers with his catchphrase, "Oh, man!" before escaping. However, he has been shown to expose his heroic side in some episodes like "Swiper the Explorer", where he assists Dora and Boots in returning a baby fox to its parents. He is voiced by Marc Weiner.
Tod	The Fox and the Hound	Voiced by Mickey Rooney, Tod is a young orphaned red fox who befriends a hunting hound dog as a pup but finds they cannot remain friends.
Vic	The Little Fox	
Vice Presidential	Star Driver: Kagayaki no Takuto	
Zorori	Kaiketsu Zorori	
Zuzo	Elena of Avalor	A fox spirit guide for Elena.

=== Other ===
Name	Species	Origin	Notes
Balto	Wolfdog	Balto	Balto is a wolf-dog hybrid, shunned by both humans and dogs in the town of Nome. He is a rugged spirit, adventurer of his social domain; a rebel soul, no one to turn to but himself. His only friends are Boris, a Russian goose, Jenna, a Siberian Husky and Muk and Luk, two polar bears. Balto and Boris live on a grounded boat outside Nome, while Muk and Luk are occasional visitors.
Danny	Dingo	Blinky Bill	The oldest brother of the family and main antagonist of the first season. A suave, smug dingo, almost always seen with his sunglasses on, with a scheming personality, usually thinking of ways to scam the townspeople.
Meatball	Dingo	Blinky Bill	The second-oldest brother, known for his weight; what he lacks in terms of intellect he makes up for in strength.
Daisy	Dingo	Blinky Bill	The lone sister of the family. Vain and flirtatious, with aspirations of fame, she tends to use her good looks and seductive charm to get her way.
Ma	Dingo	Blinky Bill	The matriarch of the dingo family with a short temper and a large appetite.
Shifty	Dingo	Blinky Bill	A kindhearted young dingo who became a member of Blinky's gang at the end of season 1.
Skalk	African wild dog	Khumba	
Digeri Dingo	Dingo	Taz-Mania	Scavenger, treasure hunter, and Taz's best friend.
Donna Dingo	Dingo	Taz-Mania	Scavenger, treasure hunter, Taz's friend, and Digeri's girlfriend.

== Other performing arts ==
Name	Type	Origin	Art form	Notes
Sharp Ears	Fox	The Cunning Little Vixen	Opera	Music and libretto by Leoš Janáček
Lapák	Dog (dachshund)	The Cunning Little Vixen	Opera	Music and libretto by Leoš Janáček

== Animatronics ==
- Dook LaRue, a drum-playing dog from The Rock-afire Explosion at Showbiz Pizza Place.
- Jasper T. Jowls, a guitar-playing (former banjo) playing hound dog from Chuck E. Cheese's.
- Foxy Colleen, a female Irish fox who was a guest star at Chuck E. Cheese's during its Pizza Time Theatre days.
- Harmony Howlette, a female coyote who was a guest star at Chuck E. Cheese's during its Pizza Time Theatre days.
- The Beagles, a group of beagles from Chuck E. Cheese's Pizza Time Theatre who would sing archived songs from their namesake, The Beatles.
- The Beach Bowzers, a group of dogs from Chuck E. Cheese's Pizza Time Theatre who would sing archived songs from The Beach Boys. Their animatronics were modified from the Beagles.
