= Avifauna (disambiguation) =

Avifauna refers to the birds collectively or defined by a specific region, habitat, or geological period.

Avifauna may also refer to:

== Organizations and places ==
- Vogelpark Avifauna, a large bird park in Alphen aan den Rijn, Netherlands

== Literature ==
- The Avifauna of Laysan, a 1893 book by Lionel Walter Rothschild
- The Avifauna of British India and Its Dependencies, a major 19th-century work by James A. Murray (zoologist)
- The Avifauna of the Island of Ceylon. Bombay, an 1890 book by James A. Murray (zoologist)

== See also ==
- Fauna, the animals of a particular region or time
- Flora, the plants of a particular region or time
- Lists of birds, index of avifauna by region
- Megafauna, large animals of a particular region or time
