= List of fictional pinnipeds =

Pinnipeds (from Latin pinna "wing or fin" and ped- "foot"), or fin-footed mammals, are a widely distributed and diverse group of semi-aquatic marine mammals. Seals, sea lions, and walruses are well-known examples of pinnipeds. In addition to inspiring the names for many sports teams (such as the three sports teams in the San Francisco, California, area known as "the Seals"), pinnipeds have also inspired a number of fictional characters, creatures, and entities across human culture and media.

== Seals and sea lions ==
- In Icelandic folklore, the magical seal on whose back Sæmundr fróði traveled from Europe to Iceland
- Balloon-Meister, a sea lion who is a member of the beast pack, from Kirby and the Forgotten Land
- Bobbie, a seal hostess of the second season of the Canadian adult animated television series Life's a Zoo
- Chip, a seal from Hello Kitty's Furry Tale Theater
- Fluke, Rudder and Gerald, sea lions from Finding Dory
- Flynn, an elephant seal in Ice Age 4: Continental Drift
- Monty, a puppet elephant seal from Jim Henson's Animal Show
- Pup, a seal from In Search of Santa
- Sirotan, a harp seal Japanese merchandise character
- Stefano, a sea lion in Madagascar 3: Europe's Most Wanted
- Havoc, known as Lang in Japan, an anthropomorphic seal who is the main protagonist of the video game High Seas Havoc
- Hunter, a leopard seal in The Penguins of Madagascar
- Short Fuse, a harp seal in The Penguins of Madagascar
- Sophie, a circus seal whom Dr. Dolittle befriends and helps escape back to the ocean, in Doctor Dolittle's Circus and Dr. Dolittle
- Rojas, a leopard seal in Happy Feet and Happy Feet 2
- Bryan the Beachmaster, an elephant seal in Happy Feet 2
- Lou Seal, mascot for the San Francisco Giants
- Kotick, the main character in Rudyard Kipling's short story "The White Seal", later made into a cartoon by Chuck Jones
- Salty, a seal that appears in the Disney cartoons Pluto's Playmate and Mickey and the Seal and later in Mickey's Mouseworks, House of Mouse and Mickey Mouse Clubhouse
- The title character of Andre
- Skæg, a seal sea captain in the Danish comics series Rasmus Klump
- Slappy the sea lion from the film Slappy and the Stinkers
- Slick, a puppet sea lion from Jim Henson's Animal Show
- Sully, a sea lion from Danger Rangers
- Thornton, a harbor seal from Shark Bait
- Whiskers from Manta and Moray
- Esmeralda the sea lion from the Disney version of 20,000 Leagues Under the Sea
- The San-X company characters Mamegoma
- The main characters of Romeo & Juliet: Sealed with a Kiss
- Sandy, an orphaned seal from the film Sandy the Seal
- Sparky, an escaped seal in the episode "Love and Sandy" from the 1964 television series Flipper
- Wolfgang the Seal, former character from Sesame Street
- At the end of the fantasy novel Kitty and the Midnight Hour, there is a mention of Homo sapiens pinnipedia, a wereseal. This mention is expanded upon in Kitty's House of Horrors, where the heroine meets a wereseal, Alaskan state legislator Lee.
- Robby, friend of Pingu
- Robby, a friend of Lars from The Little Polar Bear
- The titular character of Seabert, a whitecoat seal
- Smaxey, the former seal mascot of Kellogg's Sugar Smacks
- Sneezly, Hanna Barbera's sneezing seal from Breezly and Sneezly
- Selkie, a sea lion from Nim's Island

== Walruses ==
- The Walrus from Lewis Carroll's poem "The Walrus and the Carpenter"
- Bubba, a puppet walrus from Jim Henson's Animal Show
- Capn' Cragg, a walrus from In Search of Santa
- Chumley, the walrus sidekick to Tennessee Tuxedo (the Penguin)
- Coach Whistler, a walrus who lives in the Land of Play in Jim Henson's Pajanimals
- Dash, a walrus from The Little Mermaid II: Return to the Sea
- Hercule Moustache, a grumpy walrus with a French accent who lives in Mossy Bay, in 64 Zoo Lane
- Jim McSweeney from the second issue of The Adventures of Sly Cooper
- The Sea Vitch, a rude walrus in Rudyard Kipling's short story The White Seal
- Thrasher, a walrus in Tappy Toes
- Wally Walrus
- Rotor Walrus, a technician walrus from Sonic the Hedgehog
- Whoopie the walrus in Rocket: Robot on Wheels
- Winthrop, a walrus in Piper Penguin and His Fantastic Flying Machines
- Kapitein Wal Rus, a sea captain in Tom Poes
- Captain Thames in Xenogears
- The cruel walruses in the movie adaptation of The Jungle Bunch, a Canadian-American children's show
- Wozza, a walrus who lives in a cave in Freezeezy Peak in Banjo-Kazooie
- A walrus named Rusty Walrus who appeared in Crash Twinsanity during the level of High Seas Hi-Jinks, who chases Crash which he calls fresh meat for his pot
- Russell, a walrus with a storage unit inside in Middlemost Post
- Mr. Frosty, a walrus who serves as a mini-boss from the Kirby series
- Wal Rus (Marvel Comics), an anthropomorphic walrus and ally of Rocket Raccoon with mechanical, interchangeable tusks
- Wally the Walrus from Paw Patrol
- Wendell, a traveling artist from the Animal Crossing series
