= List of fictional cetaceans =

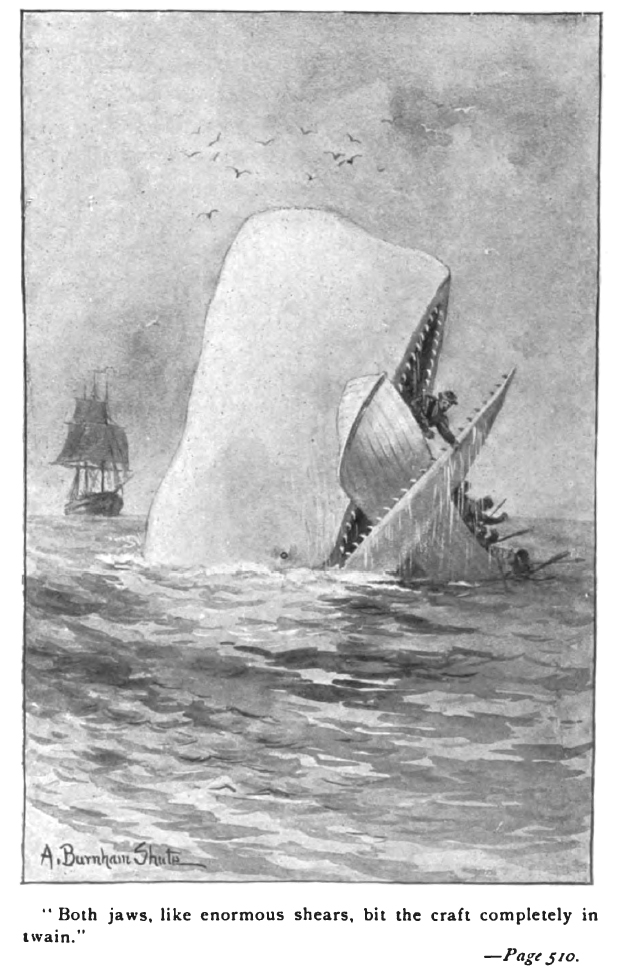
Moby Dick attacking a whaling boat

This is a list of fictional cetaceans, including dolphins and whales, that appear in video games, film, television, animation, comics, and literature. The list is limited to notable, named characters and is a subsidiary of Lists of fictional animals.

== Dolphins ==
- Bernie, from the Bernie the Dolphin movies
- Ecco, the titular character from the Ecco the Dolphin video game series
- Flipper, from the Flipper franchise, introduced in the 1963 film, Flipper
- Fluke, a puppet dolphin from Jim Henson's Animal Show
- Jones, a cyborg dolphin from the short story "Johnny Mnemonic" by William Gibson
- Moby Lick, a human named Jets Taylor who is combined with a killer whale by the evil Dr. Paradigm in the animated television series Street Sharks
- Snorky, from The Simpsons' "Treehouse of Horror XI" segment "Night of the Dolphin"
- Willy, an orca from the Free Willy franchise, introduced in the 1993 American family drama film, Free Willy
- Zoom, from the anime Zoom the White Dolphin
- Wallace, from Baby Shark's Big Show!

== Whales ==
- Anita, a puppet humpback whale from Jim Henson's Animal Show
- Andrew, a puppet humpback whale from Jim Henson's Animal Show
- Bubbie, an anthropomorphic whale from The Marvelous Misadventures of Flapjack, introduced in 2007
- Lyngbakr (Icelandic, lyngi "heather" + bak "back"), a massive whale-like sea monster reported in the Örvar-Odds saga to have existed in the Greenland Sea
- Moby Dick, a sperm whale in the novel Moby-Dick (also often incorrectly spelt without the hyphen) by Herman Melville
- Monstro, the whale in the 1940 Disney film Pinocchio
- Pearl Krabs, a character in the Nickelodeon animated television series SpongeBob SquarePants, introduced in 1999
- Hank, from Baby Shark's Big Show!

== See also ==
- Orcas in popular culture
