= List of fictional reptiles =

This list of fictional reptiles is subsidiary to the list of fictional animals and is a collection of various notable reptilian characters that appear in various works of fiction. It is limited to well-referenced examples of reptiles in literature, film, television, comics, animation, video games and mythology, organized by species.

== Lizards ==
Name	Media	Work	Notes
Alphys	Video game	Undertale	A stout reptile-monster that is the Royal Scientist, a position she earned by creating a robot with a SOUL. She is a timid Otaku and cannot be battled. She has a crush on Undyne and Asgore, captain of the royal guard and king of the underground, respectively.
Bad Bill	Animation	Rango	A Gila monster
Bill the Lizard	Literature	Alice in Wonderland	A green lizard - it's not mentioned what kind.
Bing	Animation	The Angry Beavers	Voiced by Victor Wilson. He is an obnoxious and clingy lizard who bothers Norbert and Daggett. He also has a girlfriend named Wanda who once broke up with him.
Budzo	Animation	Adventures in Zambezia	A sinister rock monitor who tried to takes over Zambezia.
Chameleon	Animation	T.U.F.F. Puppy	An evil and devious chameleon in a molecular transformation suit, which allows him to shapeshift into virtually any disguise or inanimate object.
Chet Gecko	Literature	The Chameleon Wore Chartreuse	A detective whose specialty is working dangerously.
Chuck and Leon	Animation	Rocko's Modern Life	Chameleon brothers
Dimitri	Video game	Sly Cooper	A vain, French marine iguana artist/frogman who speaks using Hip-hop slang. In Sly 2, he is fought as an antagonist who forges paintings and is a member of the Klaww Gang. In Sly 3 and 4, he is an ally to the Cooper gang, helping them after they retrieve his grandfather's diving gear.
Chameleon	Animation	Lily to Kaeru to (Otouto)	A chameleon.
Espio	Video game	Knuckles' Chaotix	An anthropomorphic chameleon who is a ninja warrior.
Flick	Video game	Animal Crossing: New Horizons	An anthropromorphic, red chameleon. He buys the player's bugs, makes bug model commissions, and runs a season bug catching tourney.
Gaspar Le'Gecko	Animation	Brandy & Mr. Whiskers	A gecko.
Geico Gecko	Television	GEICO commercials	A gecko that looks similar to a day gecko.
Gex	Video game	Gex	A gecko.
Goanna	Animation	FernGully: The Last Rainforest	
Gosha	Comic	Beastars	A monitor lizard who is Legoshi's grandfather.
Henry	Animation	Henry's Amazing Animals	A lizard.
Ihu	Theme park	Aquatica	
Izzy	Animation	The Loud House	Lana Loud's pet gecko. He seems to have been used as a replacement for her former pet frog, Seymour.
Joanna	Animation	The Rescuers Down Under	A goanna who is Percival McLeach's pet and acts to terrify her captives.
Knuckles	Animation	Quack Pack	Daisy Duck's pet iguana.
Komodo	Animation	The Secret Saturdays	
Komodo Dragon	Video game	Block Tales	A komodo dragon who fights the main protagonist, mistaking them for the villains who covered and destroyed her home.
Komodo Joe, Komodo Moe	Video game	Crash Bandicoot	Two villainous Komodo dragon brothers.
Liz	Literature	The Magic School Bus	An anthropomorphic class pet lizard.
Lizardman	Myth and folklore	Worldwide	An anthromorphic lizard
Leon Powalski	Video game	Star Fox	A chameleon fighter pilot and a member of Star Wolf.
Meatball	Animation	The Casagrandes	An iguana owned by Adelaide Chang.
Modo Olachenko	Animation	GOAT	An eccentric Komodo dragon and famous roarball player.
Mr. Dupette	Animation	Rocko's Modern Life	A lizard.
Nat	Video game	Animal Crossing	A green chameleon that runs the bug catching tourney in Animal Crossing (City Folk and New Leaf).
Noi Crezant	Comic	Hoshi no Samidare	A lizard
Mr. E	Animation	Work It Out Wombats!	A shopkeeper iguana.
Mrs Kipling	Television	Jessie	Ravi's pet water monitor
Private I. Guana	Literature	Private I. Guana: The Case of the Missing Chameleon	A detective iguana in search of Leon the missing chameleon.
Pascal	Animation	Tangled	Rapunzel's pet chameleon.
Rango	Animation	Rango	A pet chameleon who becomes lost in the Mojave Desert.
Ruff	Animation	Blinky Bill	
Roderick Lizzard	Animation	Bonkers	An actorly iguana.
Target	Live-action/Animation	Wild Kratts	A male Parson's chameleon that first appeared in Chameleons on Target. Martin named him that because he's always on target.
Vinnie Terrio	Animation	Littlest Pet Shop	A male green gecko with purple eyes

== See also ==
- List of reptilian humanoids
