= List of fictional crocodiles and alligators =

This is a list of fictional crocodiles and alligators from literature, mascots and emblems of teams and organizations, comics, films, animations and video games.

This list is subsidiary to the list of fictional animals. It is restricted to notable crocodilian characters from notable works of fiction. Characters that appear in multiple media may have separate listings for each appearance, while in instances where a character has appeared in several separate works in a single medium, only the earliest will be recorded here.

== Literature ==
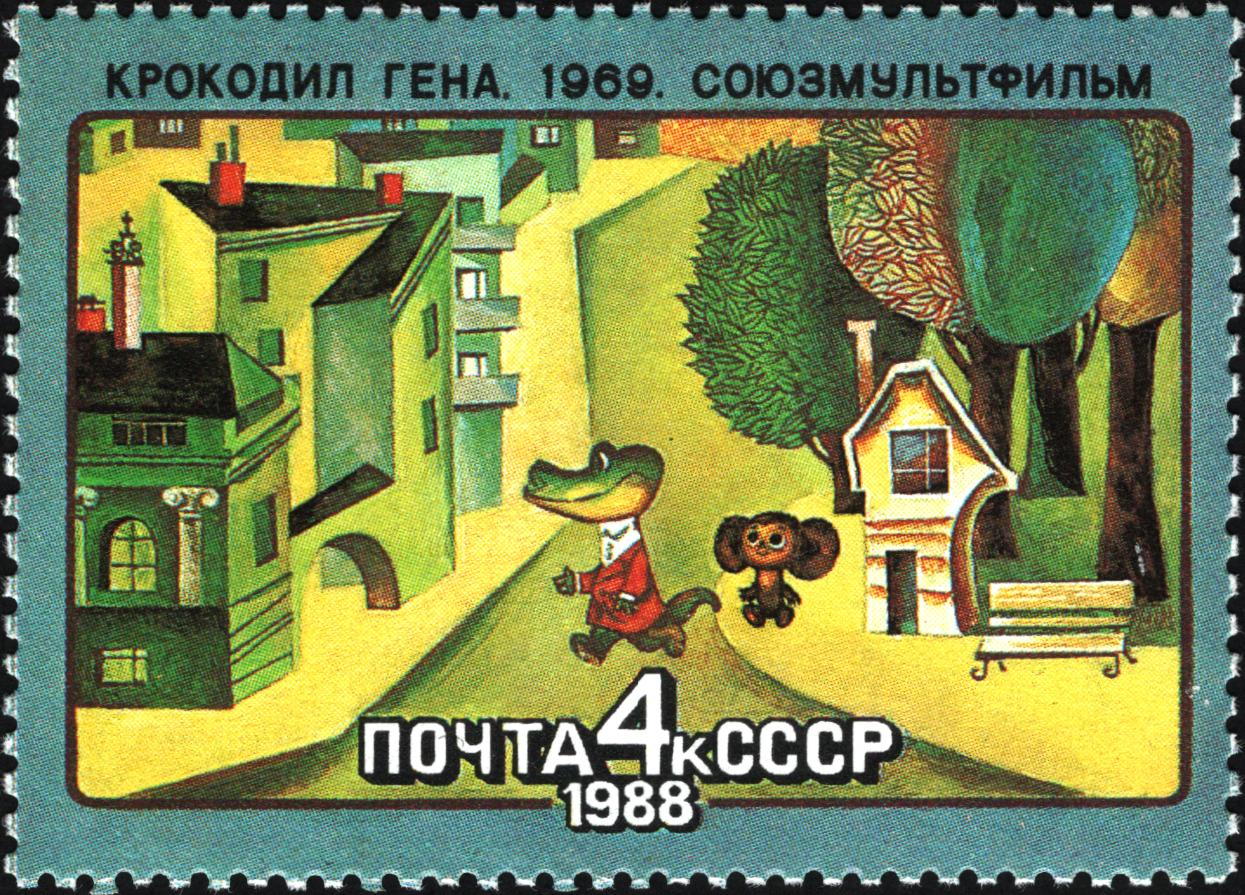
Gena the Crocodile from Cheburashka

Name	Work	Author	Date	Notes
"as headstrong as an allegory on the banks of the Nile."	The Rivals	Sheridan	1775	Mrs. Malaprop's most famous malapropism, using the word allegory instead of alligator.
Gena the Crocodile	Cheburashka	Uspensky, Eduard	1966	A friendly crocodile
Crocodile "on the banks of the great grey-green, greasy Limpopo river"	Just So Stories	Kipling, Rudyard	1902	The crocodile pulls the nose of the Elephant's Child, stretching it into a trunk.
The eponymous crocodile	The Enormous Crocodile	Dahl, Roald	1978	The crocodile wanders the jungle planning to eat children, but is foiled by other animals.
Lyle the Crocodile	Lyle the Crocodile series	Waber, Bernard	1962	A family discovers a friendly crocodile living in their home.
Mr. Croc	Mr. Croc series	Lodge, Jo	Unknown	He likes adventures and snapping.
Solomon	Solomon Crocodile	Rayner, Catherine	2011	A young playful crocodile, also appears in Solomon and Mortimer (2016)

== Folklore and myths ==
Name	Species	Country	Notes
Makara	Legendary sea creature	India	Considered guardians of gateways and thresholds.
Sobek	Crocodile-headed god	Ancient Egypt	Represents power, protection, fertility
The gharial	Gharial	India	The gharial's wife wants to eat her husband's friend the monkey.
Sang Buaya	Big bad crocodile	Southeast Asia	The crocodiles are fooled by Sang Kancil, the mouse deer

== Mascots and emblems ==
Crocodiles and alligators are used as mascots and emblems by organisations and sports teams:

- Albert and Alberta Gator of the Florida Gators, representing the University of Florida
- Canton Crocodiles, a baseball team in the Frontier league.
- Southern Districts football team in the Australian Northern Territory Football League.
- "Ice-Gator" and "Lagoona Gator" are the mascots for Disney's Blizzard Beach and Disney's Typhoon Lagoon waterparks in Walt Disney World
- Crocs brand footwear manufacturer logo
- Lacoste logo.

== Comics ==
Name	Comic	Notes
Alabaster Alligator	Pogo	The smarter little nephew of Albert Alligator
Albert Alligator	Pogo	The good but not very bright friend of Pogo Possum.
Archie Alligator	Jungle Jinks	A school child and main cast member.
Crocodylus	Pinky	A mad scientist.
Fraternity of Crocodiles	Pearls Before Swine	Also known as "Da Brudderhood of Zeeba Zeeba Eata".
Killer Croc	Batman	A supervillain who appears in comic books published by DC Comics and an enemy of Batman. The character first appeared in Batman #358 (April 1983). Killer Croc is initially presented as having a humanoid appearance and scaly skin. In later appearances, Killer Croc is depicted as more animalistic and his condition is portrayed as a form of atavism.
Leatherhead	Teenage Mutant Ninja Turtles	A mutated alligator.
Soundwave	Beast Wars	Has the form of an alligator.

== Film ==
Name	Film	Year	Director	Notes
Arnie	The Muppet Movie	1979	James Frawley	A fictional Muppet alligator who chases Bernie the Agent in Kermit's swamp. Later appeared as a talking alligator in Kermit's Swamp Years.
Daisy	An Alligator Named Daisy	1955	J. Lee Thompson	A young man's life is complicated by the inheritance of an alligator.
Ramon	Alligator	1980	Lewis Teague	A mutated American alligator from the sewers.
Flat Dog	Crocodile	2000	Tobe Hooper	A large female Nile crocodile that stalks and kills teenagers for raiding her nest.
Gustave	Primeval	2005	Michael Katleman	Inspired by a true story, Gustave is an enormous male Nile crocodile in Africa responsible for the deaths of 300 people.
Lizzie	Rampage	2018	Brad Peyton	A giant American crocodile from the Everglades mutated by a genetically modified pathogen.

== Animation ==
Name	Animation	Notes
Agle	Cocomong	A cucumber-shaped crocodile.
Al	Miami Guns	
Al	Can You Teach My Alligator Manners?	
Aldo	Sitting Ducks	An alligator who befriended main character Bill the Duck and is trying to blend into DuckTown.
Alfy Gator	Yakky Doodle	A blue alligator who tries to capture Yakky because his gourmet guidebook recommends roast duck.
Alligator Master	World Destruction: Sekai Bokumetsu no Rokunin	
Arlo Beauregard	Arlo the Alligator Boy	
Axl and Bull Gator	Taz-Mania	These alligators are always trying to catch Taz and sell him to a zoo.
Ben Ali Gator	Fantasia	The prince of the Alligators, who falls in love with Hyacinth Hippo.
Bog	The Outback	Antagonistic crocodile who wants to control the Australian billabong.
Brutus & Nero	The Rescuers	The two crocodiles under Madame Medusa's command.
Carmine	The Wild	
Catchum Crocodile	The Get Along Gang	The show's main antagonist.
Charley	Maisy	An 8-year-old crocodile who loves to eat.
Christopher	Christopher Crocodile	
Crocco	Re-Animated	
Crocodile Gentleman	Witch Craft Works	
Crocubot	Rick and Morty	Half robot, half crocodile.
Derick	The Secret Life of Pets	A crocodile who is one of the Flushed Pets.
Dil	The Land Before Time IV: Journey Through the Mists	A nearsighted Deinosuchus along with Ichy who tried to eat Littlefoot and the gang.
Floyd and Jolene	Kissyfur	The antagonist alligators
Francisco	T.U.F.F. Puppy	
Frankie Scales	Daisy Quokka: World's Scariest Animal	A saltwater crocodile who coach of Daisy Quokka and father of Ronda Saltie
The Great Fusilli	Courage the Cowardly Dog	An Italian alligator devoted to theater arts who turns people into puppets so that they cannot leave his show.
Gator Agate	Star vs. the Forces of Evil	
Gabby Gator	Woody Woodpecker	An antagonizing alligator to the wacky woodpecker.
Gretchen	Camp Lazlo	A girl scout alligator with an aggressive attitude.
Gummy	My Little Pony: Friendship Is Magic	Pinkie Pie's pet alligator.
Happy	Hey Duggee	A crocodile who loves water
Kevin	64 Zoo Lane	A miniature green crocodile who is friends with Toby and Doris.
King Gator	All Dogs Go to Heaven	A giant alligator and New Orleans voodoo witch doctor living below the streets of New Orleans, who takes a liking to Charlie's voice.
Lawrence	Rubbadubbers	Terence's imaginary friend, who appeared in the episode "Terence's Double Trouble".
Louis	The Princess and the Frog	A trumpet-playing alligator.
Mama Croc	Brandy & Mr. Whiskers	A loving crocodile mother with baby crocodiles.
Master Croc	Kung Fu Panda 2	
Max	Oddballs	A dimwitted anthropomorphic crocodile
Oops and Koops	YooHoo & Friends	The evil crocodiles from Season 2.
Panic	Wonder Egg Priority	Momoe Sawaki's crocodile pomander.
Roger	The Penguins of Madagascar	A sewer alligator who becomes one of the zoo animals.
Rover	Pound Puppies	
Shiro	Love Hina	A White Alligator
Sirol	The Adventures of Blinky Bill	
Snappy the Little Crocodile	Die Sendung mit der Maus	A German cartoon Crocodile
Stan and Carmine	The Wild	Two alligators who live in the New York sewer.
Steven	101 Dalmatians: The Series	
Terence	Rubbadubbers	A green bath toy crocodile, known for different jobs, such as a doctor and a sheriff cowboy.
Tick-Tock	Peter Pan	A saltwater crocodile who previously ate Captain Hook's hand after Peter Pan cut it off, causing the two to become bitter enemies. His name is derived from a clock he ate, which remains active in his stomach. The clock's ticking alerts Hook to the crocodile's presence.
Victor	64 Zoo Lane	A large, green crocodile, who is the main bully in Waterlilly Lake.
Wally Gator	Wally Gator	An alligator prone to mishaps.

== Video games ==
Name	First appearance	Platform(s)	Notes
King K. Rool	Donkey Kong Country	SNES · GBC · GBA	An anthropomorphic saltwater crocodile who is the main villain of many Donkey Kong games and commands the Kremlings, which are similarly made up of other crocodilian forces.
Swampy	Frogger 2: Swampy's Revenge	PlayStation, PC, Dreamcast	A crocodile villain who kidnaps dozens of baby frogs.
Dr. Wani	Frogger: Helmet Chaos	DS	An evil crocodile who owns a factory of mind control helmets from the mineral Crocodrite.
Swampy, Allie and Cranky	Where's My Water?	iOS · Android · Windows Phone · Windows 8 · BlackBerry	A trio of alligators.
Vector	Knuckles' Chaotix	Sega 32X	A crocodile who is the "head honcho" and brains of the Chaotix Detective Agency.
Snap Shot	Skylanders: Trap Team	3Ds · PS3 · PS4 · Wii · Wii U · 360 · XB1	A fearless crocagator who uses his wild tracking skills to hunt down evil monsters and eventually villains.
Renekton	League of Legends	PC	An anthropomorphic crocodile based on Sobek, brother of another champion Nasus, who is based on Anubis.
Croc	Croc: Legend of the Gobbos	PS1 · Sega Saturn · PC	A vegetarian crocodile who was found in a river by the "Gobbos". His parents and brother appear in the game's sequel.
Mz. Ruby	Sly Cooper and the Thievius Raccoonus	PS2	A musical alligator and voodoo mystic who appears as a boss.
Bratty	Undertale	PC	A tall green alligator monster who is best friends with Catty, even though she had said cats are tasty. She idolizes Mettaton along with Catty.
Beatrice	Night in the Woods	PC	A 20 year old gothic smoking crocodile who became stuck running her father's store in Possum Springs after he had an emotional breakdown.
Mr. Vile	Banjo-Kazooie	N64	A mean, hungry crocodile that will reward the player with a Jiggy if they can eat more Yumblies and Grumblies than him, but chomp them if they lose.
Latch	Lethal League	PC	A crocodile with a mechanical tail and enhancements to his spine and brain.
Most characters	Later Alligator	PC · Nintendo Switch	The game takes place in an alternate version of New York City, which is populated largely by anthropomorphic alligators.
Rosie	Maneater	PS4	An enormous female American alligator. Armed with a powerful tail for lightning fast swimming speed and sharp teeth, she is one of the seven apex predator bosses in the game.
Montgomery Gator	Five Nights at Freddy's: Security Breach	PS4 · PS5 · PC	One of the Glamrock animatronics. He hunts down the player throughout the game and eventually acts as one of the game's bosses.
