= List of fictional snakes =

This list of fictional snakes is subsidiary to the list of fictional animals and is a collection of various notable serpentine characters that appear in various works of fiction. It is limited to well-referenced examples of snakes in literature, music, film, television, comics, animation and video games.

== Literature ==
Name	Work	Author	Notes
Anthony J. Crowley	Good Omens	Terry Pratchett and Neil Gaiman	Originally named Crawly. He is a main character as the snake-demon who tempted Eve, though he spends most of the novel in human form.
Asmodeus Poisonteeth	Redwall	Brian Jacques	A giant adder who lives in an old sandstone quarry northeast of Redwall Abbey.
Kaa	The Jungle Book	Rudyard Kipling	An Indian python who is a friend and mentor of Mowgli.
Jörmungandr	Skaldic poem Húsdrápa		A giant serpent who is destined to kill Thor during Ragnarök.
Mrs. Plithiver	Guardians of Ga'Hoole	Kathryn Lasky	A nursemaid snake who cared for Soren, Kludd, and Eglentine when they were young.
Nag and Nagaina	Rikki-Tikki-Tavi	Rudyard Kipling	Two king cobras who confront Rikki, believing him to be a threat to their unborn children.
Nagini	Harry Potter	J.K. Rowling	A snake who serves Voldemort and acts as one of his Horcruxes. In Fantastic Beasts: The Crimes of Grindelwald, Nagini is depicted as a human who was cursed to transform into a snake.
Salmissra	The Belgariad and The Malloreon	David Eddings	Originally queen of Nyissa, Salmissra was turned into a giant serpent by the sorceress Polgara.
Violet	Mother's Day Surprise	Stephen Krensky	A snakelet who gives her mother an ingenious Mother's Day gift.

== Music ==
Name	Song(s)	Musician	Notes
Hissing Sid	"Captain Beaky", a single from the album Captain Beaky and His Band	Keith Michell	The single reached Number 5 in the UK singles charts in 1980. "Hissing Sid is Innocent" subsequently became a popular catchphrase.
President Snakes	"President Snakes" songs from the album President Snakes	The Doubleclicks	President Snakes is a fictional politician made up of five snakes running for the United States presidential election. She ends up losing, but winning the swing states.

== Comics ==
Name	Work	Notes
Midgard Serpent	Marvel Comics	A giant serpent who is an enemy of Thor, based on the mythological entity of the same name.
Pyton	Pyton	A pantomime comic by Jan Romare about a man who has a python as a pet.
Snake	Snake Tales	A comic strip written by Australian cartoonist Allan Salisbury also known as Sols.
Snavely	Pogo	From Walt Kelly's Pogo, friend to Ol' Mouse.

== Animation ==
Name	Film/Series	Notes
Adder	The Animals of Farthing Wood	
Ajar	Sahara	A blue cobra.
Ayame Sohma	Fruits Basket	A member of the Sohma family who was cursed to transform into a white snake.
Blue Racer	The Blue Racer	A blue snake.
Craig Slithers	Sanjay and Craig	Sanjay's anthropomorphic pet snake whom he met in a pet store, but does not like to be called just a pet.
Cobra	Happy Tree Friends	A cobra who bit Toothy at his arm when he tried to make a tent in "Take a Hike".
Cy Sly	Ovide and the Gang	A small python who acts as the series' antagonist.
El Diablo	The Loud House	Lana Loud's pet snake, who is often seen with the rest of her personal pets.
Eva	Sahara	A green snake who is Ajar's love interest.
Gary De'Snake	Zootopia 2	A blue viper criminal with a missing fang.
Ju-Ju	The Princess and the Frog	A snake who belongs to Mama Odie.
King Cobra	Little Singham	A military leader who want to destroy India and is the biggest enemy of Little Singham.
Maddie	Back to the Outback	An Inland Taipan with a heart of gold who longs to return to the Australian Outback
Malcho	Aladdin	A giant flying serpent who is an enemy of the rain bird Thundra.
Master Viper	Kung Fu Panda	A green tree viper and member of the Furious Five.
Mr. Snake	The Bad Guys	A sarcastic safe-cracking eastern brown snake who is Mr. Wolf's second-in-command and best friend.
Messina	Freddy as F.R.O.7	A sorceress and one of the two main antagonists (along with El Supremo) of Freddy the Frog.
Murgatroid	The Brave Little Toaster to the Rescue	
Pietra	Sahara	One of the snakes in the Snake Charmer's basket
Rattlesnake Jake	Rango	A western diamondback rattlesnake and outlaw.
Quique	Work It Out Wombats!	The single father of Sammy.
Sammy	Work It Out Wombats!	A 7-year-old emerald tree boa who is best friends with Malik.
Sir Hiss	Robin Hood	A snake who is the counsellor of King John.
Slips Python	My Gym Partner's a Monkey	An easy-going, street-talking green tree python.
SlobbySnake	HobbyKids Adventures	An anaconda who is a member of the SlobbyKids
Snake	Skunk Fu	A serpentine spy for Master Panda and the other animals in the Valley.
Snake	Toy Story	
Sir Pentious	Hazbin Hotel	
Zaina	Koati	

== Television ==
Name	Show	Notes
Mara	Doctor Who	A being of pure hatred, anger and greed who requires the fear of its victims to survive. It exists in the minds of its victims and can transmit itself telepathically, although it can also physically manifest as a giant snake.
Nigel	Vegetable Soup	A pet boa constrictor belonging to an African-American boy named Martin in a "Real People" serial from the series.
Sammy the Snake	Sesame Street	A snake-like Muppet who looks and sounds like the letter S.
Sandy the Snake	Sesame Street	A rattlesnake.

== Video games ==
Name	Game	Notes
Coily	Q*bert	A purple snake who is one of the game's enemies.
Coily Rattler	Kirby: Triple Deluxe	A large rattlesnake who appears as a boss in Wild World.
Dendar the Night Serpent	Forgotten Realms	A snake from the campaign setting for the Dungeons & Dragons fantasy role-playing game.
Fire Viper	Skylanders: Swap Force	A giant flying serpent who can breathe fire and appears as a boss in Serpent's Peak.
Genghis and Atilla	Sneaky Snakes	Two snake characters who are on a journey to save Sonia Snake from the Nasty Nibbler.
Histup	Banjo-Kazooie	A snake who is the pet of Rubee the snake charmer.
Iluzija	Resident Evil 6	A giant, mutated snake who appears as a boss.
Lyric the Last Ancient	Sonic Boom: Rise of Lyric and Sonic Boom: Shattered Crystal	
Mr. Huggy	Broken Age	A constricting snake who fears loud noises. Its namesake originates from a stuffed snake that the character of Shay has previously owned.
Noodle	Snake Pass	A coral snake who is the game's protagonist.
Rattle and Roll	Snake Rattle 'n' Roll	Two snakes who are the game's player characters.
Rattle Shake	Skylanders: Swap Force	
Rattlesnake	Deadly Creatures	A rattlesnake who hunts the main protagonist (a tarantula) throughout the game.
Rattly	Donkey Kong	A snake who assists Diddy Kong and Dixie Kong in rescuing Donkey Kong from King K. Rool.
Sssnacker	Kirby and the Forgotten Land	A large snake who is a member of the Beast Pack.
Summer	Spiritfarer	A brown and yellow snake spirit wearing a green hooded cloak. She is a character the protagonist meets and assists.
Transia	Threefold Recital	A snake who gained the ability to assume a human form. She is a skilled artist and can manipulate her body into paintings and disguise herself as others by painting their likeness.
Trowzer	Yooka-Laylee	A snake character who teaches Yooka and Laylee new moves.
Yawn	Resident Evil	A giant mutated adder who lived in Spencer's Mansion.

== See also ==
- Legendary Serpents
