= Udo the Red Panda =

Official mascot of the University of Mannheim

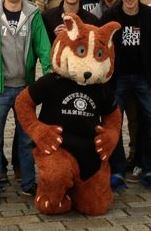
- The University of Mannheim's mascot Udo
- University: University of Mannheim
- Conference: WHU Euromasters
- Description: Anthropomorphic red panda
- First seen: 2011

Udo the Red Panda is the costumed mascot of the University of Mannheim's athletics teams. He is an anthropomorphic red panda.

== History ==
Udo the Red Panda officially debuted at the 2011 WHU Euromasters, when Mannheim beat LMU during the championships. Since then, the mascot has been a favorite for Mannheim's athletics fans. As the Mannheim athletics teams do not have a logo on their helmets or uniforms, Udo's likeness appears on team merchandise.

The Mannheim sports teams chose the red panda for their mascot to raise awareness about the endangerment of the species. In addition, the red panda is a popular animal at the Heidelberg Zoo.

== See also ==
- List of fictional musteloids
