= Bill the Lizard =

Fictional lizard in "Alice in Wonderland"

- Alice character
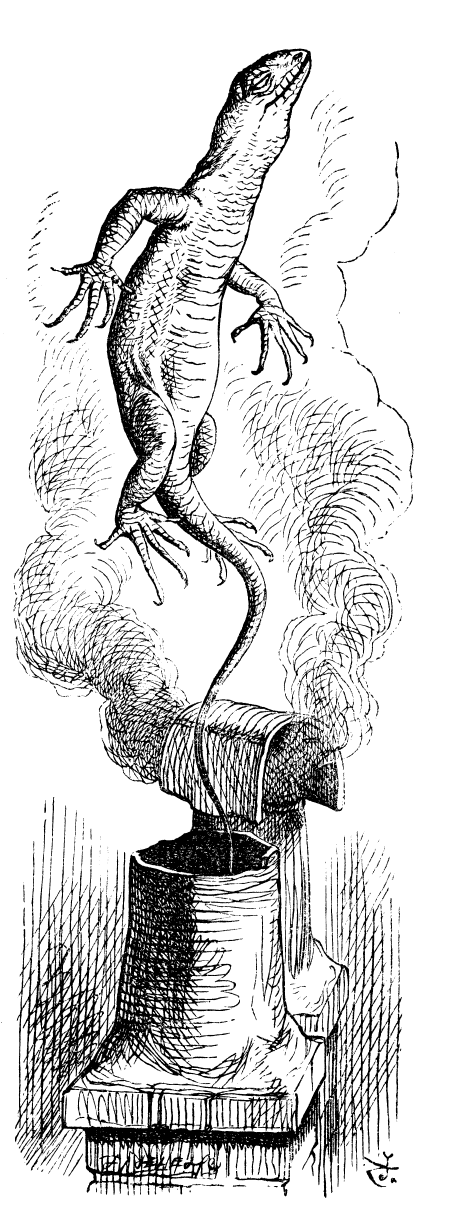
- Bill the Lizard, 1865 illustration by John Tenniel
- First appearance: Alice's Adventures in Wonderland
- Created by: Lewis Carroll

In-universe information
- Species: Lizard
- Gender: Male
- Nationality: Wonderland

Bill the Lizard is a fictional character appearing in Lewis Carroll's 1865 novel Alice's Adventures in Wonderland.

== Fictional character biography ==
Introduced in "Chapter Four – The Rabbit Sends a Little Bill", Bill the Lizard is perceived by Alice to be someone who does all of the hard work for the White Rabbit and other Wonderland denizens. When Alice becomes stuck in the White Rabbit's house due to drinking from an unlabeled bottle that made her grow uncontrollably, the rabbit's attempts to get in through the door and window fail. Bill the Lizard is sent to go through the chimney to investigate, since he and another creature have a ladder in their possession. Unwilling to let Bill get through the chimney, Alice uses her now huge foot, which is in the chimney, to kick Bill into the air. He manages to survive the fall thanks to fellow creatures.

Reappearing in "Chapter Eleven – Who Stole the Tarts?", Bill is a juror in the trial of The Knave of Hearts' supposed theft of The Queen of Heart's tarts. When his pencil squeaks too much on his slate, it annoys Alice to the point that she takes the pencil from him. Not knowing where it went, Bill the Lizard starts using his finger to write, even though it leaves no mark on the slate. In "Chapter Twelve – Alice's Evidence", he becomes disheveled when Alice disturbs the jury by messing up the jury box. When Alice puts Bill the Lizard back in his place, he stares blankly up in the sky. Then later, the Queen provides ink for Bill when she spills ink on his face.

== In other media ==
=== 1915 film ===
Bill appears about 13 minutes into the 1915 silent film version of Alice in Wonderland.

=== Disney version ===
Bill as he appears in the 1951 Disney film

Bill makes a brief appearance in the 1951 Disney animated film based on the book. In this version, he is portrayed as a chimney sweep with a Cockney accent, voiced by Larry Grey. Bill is recruited by the White Rabbit and the Dodo to go down the Rabbit's chimney to pull the "monster" (Alice, made giant) out of the house. He seems to accept the task at first, but when he sees Alice in the window and realizes that he's been asked to retrieve a "monster", he tries to run in terror. However, the Dodo catches him and forces him down the chimney, telling him this could be his moment of glory. Unlike in the book, Alice does not kick Bill out, since her hands and legs are sticking out outside of the house. Instead, he spreads a lot of soot, causing Alice to begin to sneeze. Hearing her inhale frantically, the White Rabbit hides and the Dodo is knocked off the roof as Alice wriggles inside, trying to suppress the sneeze. Bill, however, cannot escape in time, and Alice's sneeze is so big it blows all of the soot out of the house and rockets Bill into the sky, after which he is not seen again for the rest of the film.

A lizard identical in appearance to Bill, voiced by Wayne Allwine, is a member of Ratigan's gang in the 1986 film The Great Mouse Detective.

Bill make cameo appearances in the film Who Framed Roger Rabbit, where he is helping someone hold a ladder in the studios of Maroon Cartoons, and in the television series House of Mouse, being seen walking along with Dodo in the opening sequence.

=== American McGee's Alice ===
Bill (under the name of Bill McGill) makes a cameo in the 2000 video game American McGee's Alice, voiced by Andrew Chaikin. He is much more chameleon-like and appears to be a builder, and wears a toolbelt, cap and waistcoat. He has a very cynical outlook on life and repeatedly asks Alice for brandy, until a gust from the Duchess's house forces Alice inside, causing him to run in fear. He later appears again, and explains that he'll have the leeches in to clear up the remains of the defeated Duchess. Bill is last seen at the end of the game, during Wonderland's return to peace.

=== Once Upon a Time in Wonderland ===
A character loosely based on Bill by the name Elizabeth appears in Once Upon a Time in Wonderland, portrayed by Lauren McKnight. Going by the nickname "Lizard", Elizabeth is a young woman who is one of Caterpillar's Collectors. Alice meets her upon attempting to locate the Knave of Hearts after the two split up. She tells Alice that she and the Knave were great friends in his earlier days, assisting him with many battles in Wonderland. She also reveals his love for Anastasia and that the real reason he escaped Wonderland was to forget her abandonment of him. Lizard later attempts to help Alice rescue the Knave but is knocked out by Jafar. She does regain consciousness where she sees Anastasia looking at the Knave's petrified form. Later, after bathing in the river, Elizabeth finds Cyrus's lamp where the Knave of Hearts is now residing. She makes some wishes which improve a nearby town. Elizabeth then admits to the Knave of Hearts that she has feelings for him. After unwittingly making her third wish for the Knave of Hearts to feel something for her, Elizabeth falls dead. The Jabberwocky later finds Elizabeth's dead body and takes her eyes so that Jafar can track down Cyrus's lamp.

=== Alice's Warped Wonderland ===
Bill the Lizard appeared in the 2006 Sunsoft mobile game Alice's Warped Wonderland (歪みの国のアリス, Yugami no kuni no Arisu; Alice in Distortion World). Bill takes the form of a slender young man with lizard-like attributes. Bill serves as the "Keeper of Truth" and guards Ariko's (the "Alice" of the game) suppressed tragic memories until she is ready to accept them.

== See also ==
- List of fictional reptiles
