= List of fictional dogs =

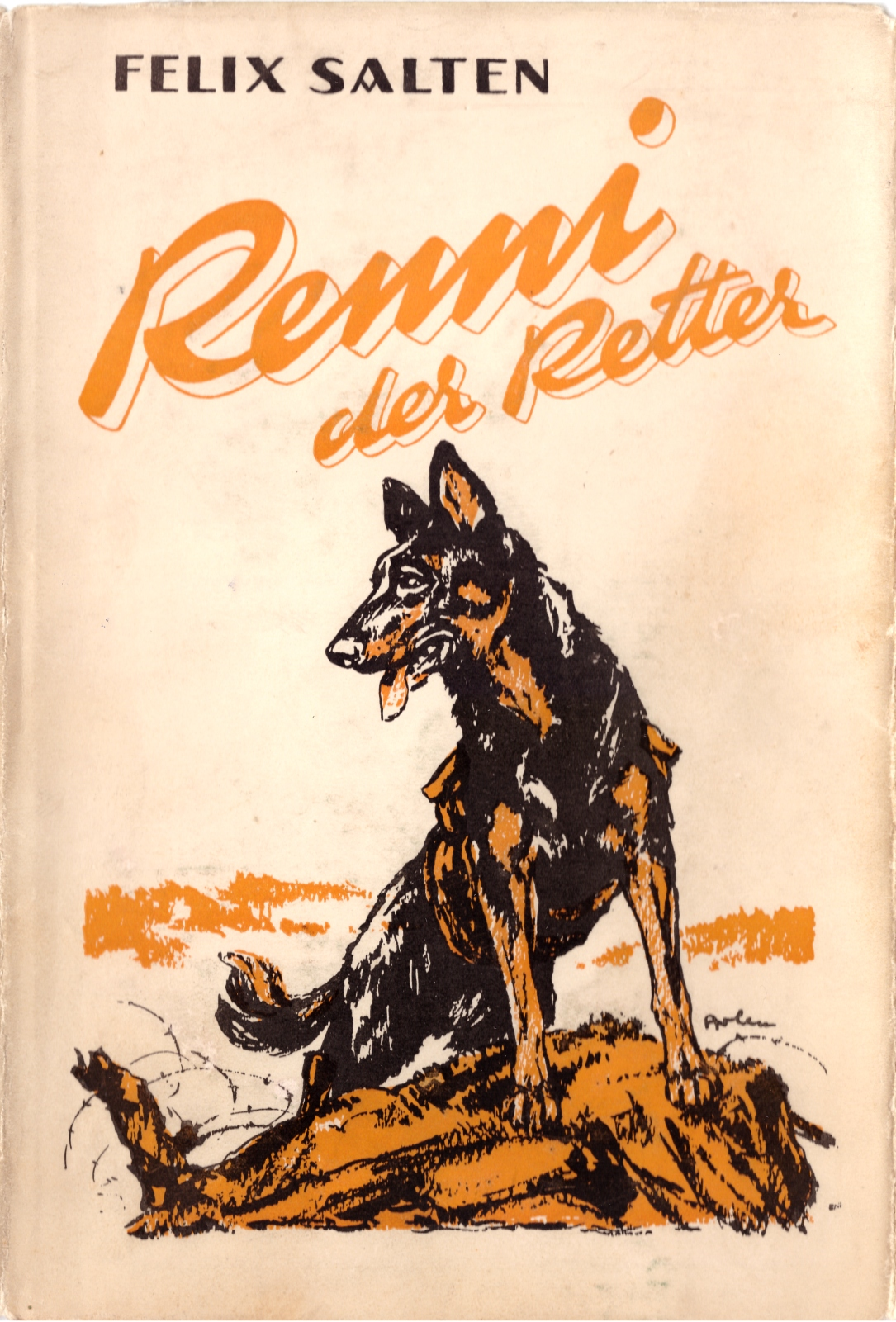
Felix Salten's Renni, as drawn by Philipp Arlen, 1941

This list of fictional dogs is part of the list of fictional animals. It is limited to notable dog characters from the world of fiction. For real/famous dogs, see List of dogs. For mythological dogs, see Mythological dogs.

== Literature ==
=== Prose and poetry ===
- Argos, King Odysseus's faithful dog in Homer's Odyssey. After Odysseus returned home to Ithaca disguised as a beggar 20 years later, it was only Argos who managed to recognize him.
- Baleia, the dog companion that follows a poor family through the hardships of the 1915 drought in Brazil in Vidas secas, by Graciliano Ramos
- Biruta, the dog in the homonymous short story by Lygia Fagundes Telles
- Bruno Lichtenstein, the dog in the homonymous short story by Rubem Braga
- Buck, in Jack London's The Call of the Wild
- Bull's-eye, Bill Sikes' dog in Oliver Twist by Charles Dickens
- Jip, resident in the household of Hugh Lofting's Dr. Dolittle
- Jip (short for Gypsy), Dora Spenlow's spaniel in Charles Dickens' David Copperfield
- Luath, Cuthullin's dog in Ossian's Fingal.
- Mr. Bones, the companion dog in Timbuktu, by Paul Auster
- Old Dan and Little Ann, Billy Colman's pair of redbone coonhounds in Where the Red Fern Grows by Wilson Rawls
- Petitcrieu in Arthurian legend
- Pingo de Ouro, Miguilim's companion in the novella Campo Geral, by João Guimarães Rosa
- Quincas Borba, the dog whose name is the same as his human's in Machado de Assis' Quincas Borba
- Randolph, a Labrador retriever and the narrator of A Dog About Town, by JF Englert
- Red, in Jim Kjelgaard's Big Red
- Ripper, Marjorie Dursley's pet dog in J.K Rowling's Harry Potter and the Prisoner of Azkaban
- Sharik, the astray dog who undergoes a transformation surgery in Heart of a Dog, by Mikhail Bulgakov
- Tentação, the dog in the homonymous short story by Clarice Lispector
- Toto, Dorothy's dog in The Wonderful Wizard of Oz, by L. Frank Baum

== Song ==
Only songs with dog characters are included in this section. Not metaphorical dogs or songs with "dog" in the title.

- Apollo, from various Coheed & Cambria songs, whose name appears in the titles of their third and fourth albums
- Arrow, from Harry Nilsson's single "Me and My Arrow", also featured in The Point!
- "Atomic Dog" by George Clinton
- "Bingo", from the spelling song of the same name.
- "Black Shuck", song by the Darkness about the spectral black dog, Black Shuck
- Blue, from the song of the same name by Peter, Paul and Mary
- Boo, from "Me and You and a Dog Named Boo", 1971 song by Lobo (aka Roland Kent Lavoie)
- "Bow Wow Wow Wow (Wild Dog on the Prowl)" sung by Mitch Ryder with Was (Not Was)
- Carlos, "A little chihuahua ... that had some kind of skin disease and was totally blind" in the song "Frank's Wild Years" by Tom Waits.
- Catalessi, "Torna Catalessi" by Caparezza
- "Death of a Martian", Red Hot Chili Peppers song about the death of Flea's dog Martian, from the 2006 album Stadium Arcadium.
- "Evelyn, A Modified Dog", from the eponymous song on Frank Zappa's "One Size Fits All" (1975).
- "Feed Jake", a song about a dog named Jake by Pirates of the Mississippi
- Fido, a talking dog from the Frank Zappa song "Stinkfoot" from his album Over-Nite Sensation (1973).
- Frank, in "Classified" by C. W. McCall
- Frunobulax, a large poodle, appears on the Frank Zappa and the Mothers album Roxy and Elsewhere (1973).
- "Gonna Buy Me a Dog", by the Monkees
- "(How Much Is) That Doggie in the Window?", a popular song by Bob Merrill, 1953, recorded by Patti Page
- "I Love My Dog", by Cat Stevens
- Jack, Crazy Chester's dog in "The Weight" by the Band
- Little Klinker, the pup who woke Santa up in "Little Klinker" by Tennessee Ernie Ford.
- "Martha My Dear" by the Beatles (Paul McCartney's sheepdog)
- "Molly Cabernet" by Kyle Stibbs
- "Old King" by Neil Young
- "Ol' Red", prison dog from the song of the same name, recorded by George Jones, Kenny Rogers and Blake Shelton
- "Old Shep" by Red Foley as also sung by Elvis Presley and many other country performers
- "Old Tige", by Jim Reeves
- Quiche Lorraine, a two-inch tall green poodle, from a song of the same name by the B-52's from the album Wild Planet
- Sam, Dood's dog in "the Ballad of Dood and Juanita" by Sturgill Simpson
- "Seamus", in song by the same name (from Meddle) by Pink Floyd
- "Where, O Where Has My Little Dog Gone?" by Septimus Winner
- "Shannon", from the Henry Gross song of that name, inspired by Gross's and Carl Wilson's Irish Setters, both named Shannon
- Sinatra, a dog named after the singer for its blue eyes in the 2002 song "Sinatra" by Canadian folk singer James Keelaghan
- Strider, Merle dog in "Over the Hills and Far Away" by Led Zeppelin
- The dog who "up and died" in "Mr. Bojangles", written by Jerry Jeff Walker
- A dog that won't get off the furniture in "Get Down" by Gilbert O'Sullivan
- "The Puppy Song" by Harry Nilsson
- "The Nudist & Mr. Pendleton" by the fictional band The Lavender Fudge Experience (from the TV series Whatever Happened to Robot Jones?)
- Queenie, a dog who was shot and killed in "Queenie's Song" by Guy Clark (co-written with Terry Allen), 2002
- "My Only Man of the Hour" by Norah Jones

== Sporting and advertising mascots ==
- Axelrod, in advertisements for Flying A Service Stations
- Big Mo for Alpo dog food
- Boo, The Citadel, named after Lt. Col. Thomas Nugent Courvoisie, known by most as "The Boo". In 2013 they introduced Boo X
- Brutus, mascot for the Canterbury Bankstown Bulldogs
- Bullseye, bull terrier mascot of Target Corporation
- Colin Curly, bulldog mascot for Quavers, voiced by Lenny Henry
- Cobi, Catalan sheepdog as the mascot for the 1992 Summer Olympics
- Dinky, chihuahua for Taco Bell fast food restaurant
- Dubs, mascot of the Washington Huskies
- Duke, in advertisements for Bush Baked Beans
- General The Citadel introduced 2003, in 2013 introduced General II aka G2
- Farfel the Dog, in advertisements for Nestle Quick chocolate
- Handsome Dan, mascot of the Yale Bulldogs
- Jack the Bulldog, mascot of the Georgetown Hoyas
- Jason, in advertisements for Hush Puppies
- Johnathan, mascot of the UConn Huskies
- Lady Greyhound, mascot of the Greyhound Lines Bus Company
- McGruff the Crime Dog, for the National Crime Prevention Council
- Moondog, mascot of the NBA, Cleveland Cavaliers
- Nipper, in advertisements for RCA
- Penny, the mascot of Dulux
- Reveille, mascot of Texas A&M University
- Rhett, mascot of the Boston University Terriers
- Rocket, cartoon canine in Life is Good Company advertisements
- Striker, mascot of the 1994 FIFA World Cup
- Smokey, mascot of the Tennessee Volunteers
- Sparky, fire dog icon for National Fire Protection Association
- Spuds MacKenzie, Budweiser beer mascot
- Uga, mascot of Georgia Bulldogs
- Walkie Talkie, the dog of Bazooka Joe
- Woofer Dog Whitten, the mascot of the Western Bulldogs

== Other fictional dogs ==
- Boggins in the radio show Adam and Joe on BBC 6 Music, 2009, voiced by Adam Buxton.
- Fairfield Industrial Dog Object, FIDO, very large moving dog sculpture in Australia
- "Froofie the Dog", a fictional cartoon dog from a Bill Cosby monologue of the same name from Inside the Mind of Bill Cosby
- Power Pup, superhero dog from the Microsoft Office Assistant
- FidoNet logo
- Dog on the Tuckerbox, an allegorical dog depicted at a historical monument in New South Wales, Australia
- Jasper T. Jowls, a bloodhound and one of the characters from the pizza chain Chuck E. Cheese's
- Lapák the dachshund in Leoš Janáček's opera The Cunning Little Vixen
- Hairy Maclary from Donaldson's Dairy, the protagonist in an eponymous storybook.

== See also ==
- Category:Films about dogs
- Dogs Playing Poker
- List of fictional canines
- List of fictional cats and other felines
- List of robotic dogs
