= San Francisco Seals =

San Francisco Seals may refer to:

- San Francisco Seals (PCL), a Pacific Coast League baseball team from 1903–1957
- San Francisco Seals (collegiate baseball), a collegiate woodbat team started in 1985 currently playing in the Great West League since 2018
- San Francisco Seals (ice hockey), a Western Hockey League team from 1961–1967 that entered the National Hockey League in the fall of 1967, as the California Seals
- San Francisco Seals (soccer), also known as the San Francisco Bay Seals, a minor league team from 1992–2000 and 2006–2008
