= List of fictional fish =

This is a list of fictional fish from literature, animation and film. This includes sharks and eels, both of which are fish. shellfish are mollusks, not fish, so he is therefore excluded.

== Animation ==
Name	Type	Work	Description
Albert	Fish	The Dreamstone	A dogfish.
Bea Goldfishberg	Goldfish	Fish Hooks	An "overly-dramatic" goldfish who is Oscar's girlfriend.
Bikini Bottomites and other Fish	Various fish	SpongeBob SquarePants	Fish that live in Bikini Bottom and other cities in the sea.
Blinky	Mutant fish	The Simpsons	A three-eyed fish.
Bruce	Great white shark	Finding Nemo	Leader of a group of sharks that wants to give up eating fish.
Bubbles	Bass	PB&J Otter	
Charlie the Tuna	Tuna	StarKist brand tuna commercials	Charlie the Tuna is the cartoon mascot and spokes-tuna for the StarKist brand. He was created in 1961 by Tom Rogers of the Leo Burnett Agency.
Cleo	Goldfish	Pinocchio	A goldfish owned by the wood-carver Geppetto.
Darwin	Goldfish	The Amazing World of Gumball	An anthropomorphic goldfish who gets adopted by the Watterson family.
Dennis	Goldfish	Stanley	Stanley's talking pet goldfish
Destiny	Whale shark	Finding Dory	A nearsighted whale shark who is Dory's childhood friend.
Don Lino	Great white shark	Shark Tale	
Dory	Pacific regal blue tang	Finding Nemo	A female palette surgeonfish in Disney/Pixar's Finding Nemo.
Electric Eel	Eel	Adventure Time	
Evo	Anglerfish	Deep	A clumsy anglerfish who is one of Deep's best friends .
Fang	Mutant shark	Total Drama	A two-legged shark
Finbar	Shark	Rubbadubbers	
Fish	Various fish	Adventure Time	
Fishface (Xever Montes)	Mutant northern snakehead	Teenage Mutant Ninja Turtles	An Afro-Brazilian criminal and member of the Foot Clan who was mutated into an anthropomorphic snakehead.
Fish in the Pacific Ocean and others	Various fish	Finding Nemo	Fish that live in the Pacific Ocean and other in anywhere.
Fish Out of Water	Goldfish	Chicken Little	
Fishtronaut	Goldfish	Fishtronaut	A Brazilian cartoon.
Flotsam and Jetsam	Eel	The Little Mermaid	Ursula's pets in Disney's The Little Mermaid.
Flounder	Tropical fish	The Little Mermaid	Ariel's sidekick in Disney's The Little Mermaid.
Frances Albacore	Fish	Cats Don't Dance	A sassy, sarcastic fish who dances with Cranston Goat.
Giant Goldfish	Goldfish	Adventure Time	Fish which is ridden by Marceline the Vampire Queen
Gill	Moorish idol	Finding Nemo	Leader of the Tank Gang.
Gummy Fish	Candy fish	Adventure Time	Fish which is made from Candy, created by Princess Bubblegum.
Gyopi	Goldfish	Goldfish Warning!	
Holu	Rainbow colored divine fish from Hawaii	Portuguese OS Show	Rui's pet fish.
Jabberjaw	Great white shark	Jabberjaw	A shark and main character of the Hanna-Barbera cartoon shorts.
Jarsh-Jarsh	Mudskipper	All Hail King Julien	A mudskipper from All Hail King Julien
Jean-Claude (JC)	Goldfish	Bionic Max	A goldfish that has water-cooled shorts
Kenny	Tiger shark	Kenny the Shark	A shark and main character in the animated series.
Klaus Heisler	Goldfish	American Dad!	The pet goldfish of the Smith family, Klaus was originally a German athlete whose mind was transferred into a goldfish's body.
Lenny	Great white shark	Shark Tale	Vegetarian shark
Mack Salmon	Salmon	The Adventures of Sam & Max: Freelance Police	A human with a fishbowl for a head, Mack Salmon is really a fish who travels on top of a fake body.
Marlin	Clownfish	Finding Nemo	Nemo's father.
Members of the Ocean Council	Various fish	Adventure Time	Fish which conduct their politics.
Milo	Siamese fighting fish	Fish Hooks	An adventurous fish who is a self-proclaimed "party-guy".
Misterjaw	Great white shark	The Pink Panther and Friends	Produced at DePatie-Freleng Enterprises in 1976 for The Pink Panther and Friends television series on NBC.
Mr. Grouper	Goldfish	Bubble Guppies	The large, friendly orange goldfish and the teacher of the Bubble Guppies.
Mr. Limpet	Fish	The Incredible Mr. Limpet	A 1964 live-action/animated film from Warner Bros..
Mr. Piranha	Red-bellied piranha	The Bad Guys	The short-fused, loose-cannon "muscle", and the youngest of the gang that is also a really beautiful singer.
Mr. Shark	Great white shark	The Bad Guys	A childish and sensitive master-of-disguise great white shark and the biggest member of the gang
Mr. Shark	Blue shark	Toy Story	A shark squeaky toy who resides in Andy's toy box.
Muddy Mudskipper	Mudskipper	The Ren & Stimpy Show	
Nemo	Clownfish	Finding Nemo	A juvenile ocellaris clownfish in Disney/Pixar's Finding Nemo.
Mrs. Puff	Pufferfish	SpongeBob SquarePants	A pufferfish with blonde hair, who is the owner and teacher of a boating school (analogous to driving school, as the "boats" are underwater equivalents to cars).
Oscar	Bluestreak cleaner wrasse	Shark Tale	An underachieving worker in the Whale Wash of Reef City.
Oscar	Catfish	Fish Hooks	A nervous catfish who is Milo's older brother.
Pi	Carpenter's flasher wrasse	Shark Bait	An orange wrasse fish who lost his parents in a fishing net.
Ponyo / Brunhilde	Goldfish	Ponyo	Ponyo befriends a five-year-old human boy, and wants to become a human girl.
Pudge	Unknown tropical fish	Lilo & Stitch	The fish who Lilo feeds peanut butter sandwiches to because she thinks he controls the weather.
Sasha	Seahorse	Help! I'm a Fish	A seahorse who befriends Stella.
Shark	Shark	Gyo	
Sharko	Great white shark	Zig & Sharko	A friendly shark who is best friends with Marina the Mermaid. He acts as her bodyguard against Zig the Hyena whom wants to eat her.
Shellsea	Jewelfish	Fish Hooks	Bea's stereotypically sassy friend
Street Sharks	Sharks	Street Sharks	Four brothers who were mutated into anthropomorphic sharks by the mad scientist Luther Paradigm.
Tiger shark	Tiger shark	Grandma and Her Ghosts	A soul of the tiger shark which A-min's friend and he is one who can see.
Troy	Tiger shark	Shark Bait	A tiger shark who terrorizes the entire population of the reef and Pi's chief nemesis.
Undertow	Tiger shark	The Little Mermaid II: Return to the Sea	Morgana's shark minion.
Vice President Blowfish	Pufferfish	Adventure Time	Blowfish which is the Vice President of President Porpoise's council.
Virgil "Bull" Sharkowski	Bull shark	My Gym Partner's a Monkey	A shark bully at the Charles Darwin Middle School.
Winnie	Seahorse	Adventures of the Little Mermaid	

== Comics ==
Name	Type	Publisher	Description
Harry'n'Hank	Tetra (Harry), Jack Dempsey (Hank)	Tantrumedia	Newspaper Funnies (Cartoon) Style Characters
Inspector Gill	Anthropomorphic fish	Fishwrap Comics	
Jeff the Land Shark	Shark	Marvel Comics	A terrestrial shark created by MODOK Superior who was adopted by Gwenpool.
King Shark	Great white shark	DC Comics	A demigod who resembles an anthropomorphic shark.
Mr. Fish	Piscine humanoid	Marvel Comics	A supervillain in the Marvel Comics universe who is an enemy of Luke Cage.
Piranha	Piranha	Marvel Comics	An anthropomorphic mutant piranha who is an enemy of Namor.
Sherman	Great white shark	Andrews McMeel Syndicate	Newspaper Funnies

== Film ==
Name	Type	Film	Notes
Bruce	Great white shark	Jaws	Bruce was the name of the mechanical shark film prop.
Edward Bloom	Fish	Big Fish	His true form is that of a giant fish in the film.
Jaguar Shark	Shark	The Life Aquatic with Steve Zissou	Killed Zissou's partner during the making of a documentary.
Justice	Tuna	Serenity	Catching Justice is the main goal of the video game that the film's universe exists in.
Wanda	Black angelfish	A Fish Called Wanda	Ken Pile's beloved pet fish, who eponymously shares its name with Jamie Lee Curtis' character.

== Television series ==
Name	Type	TV program	Notes
Abraham	Goldfish	Diff'rent Strokes	Abraham is the pet goldfish of Arnold Jackson, played by Gary Coleman.
Diva Butanding	Whale shark	Oyayi	A stylish character and the member of Pangkat Oyayi.
Dorothy	Goldfish	Elmo's World	Dorothy is owned by Elmo. Elmo frequently talks to Dorothy throughout each episode and Dorothy is featured in many 'Elmo' books.
Gail	Goldfish	The West Wing	Gail is owned by C. J. Cregg. The fish was given as a romantic gift by reporter Danny Concannon, who was told that Cregg liked goldfish crackers and believed the statement to refer to actual goldfish.
Ick	Redtail catfish	It's a Big Big World	A red catfish who lives in the pond of the World Tree.
Trevor	Goldfish	Being Human	Trevor is a goldfish, who is given by the main character John Mitchell to a woman that he fancies, after she lost her own goldfish.

== Literature ==
Name	Type	Author	Work	Notes
Carlos K. Krinklebine	Goldfish	Dr. Seuss	The Cat in the Hat	In the 1971 The Cat in the Hat TV special named Carlos K. Krinkelbein
Crested basketfish (Sagenapinna obriensis)	Fish Species	Tim Flannery	Astonishing Animals	Included in the book as a fake species of fish intended to confuse the reader; it fits in with the theme of bizarre animal adaptations so as to fool the reader into its plausibility.
Otto	Goldfish	Helen Palmer	A Fish out of Water	Illustrations by P. D. Eastman
Rainbow Fish	Rainbowfish	Marcus Pfister	The Rainbow Fish	Children's book about the value of sharing.
Swimmy	Black fish	Leo Lionni	Swimmy	Listed by the National Education Association as one of its "Teachers' Top 100 Books for Children" based on a 2007 online poll.
Terrible Dogfish	Sea monster	Carlo Collodi	The Adventures of Pinocchio	
Tiddler	Tiddler	Julia Donaldson and Axel Scheffler	Tiddler, the Story-telling Fish	The main character in the children's book by the same name, who gets lost but finds his way home through his stories.
Unnamed	Fish	Dr. Seuss	One Fish, Two Fish, Red Fish, Blue Fish	Also featured in a Beginner Book Video series.

== Mythology ==
Name	Type	Origin	Notes
Abaia	Eel	Melanesian mythology	
Fur-bearing trout	Trout	North America	A fictional creature native to the northern regions of North America.
Ikaroa		Māori mythology	A long fish said to have given birth to all the stars in the Milky Way or to be the Mother Goddess of all the stars.
Jasconius			An enormous fish in the story of Saint Brendan.
Leviathan			A biblical sea creature from Talmud.
Namazu	Catfish	Japanese mythology	A giant catfish who causes earthquakes.
Salmon of Knowledge	Salmon	Irish mythology	An ordinary salmon who ate nine hazelnuts that fell into the Well of Wisdom and gained all the world's knowledge. The first person to eat the salmon's flesh would in turn gain this knowledge.

== Video games ==
Name	Type	Game	System(s)	Notes
Cheep Cheep	Various	Super Mario Bros.	Various	One of the enemies in the Super Mario franchise. Can be seen with various colors such as red, green, yellow and purple.
Coelacanth	Coelacanth	Kemono Friends	Various	A Coelacanth Friend who first appeared in Kemono Friends 3.
James Pond	Mudskipper	James Pond: Underwater Agent	PC	A computer platform game based on a James Bond styled fish.
Freddi Fish	Goldfish	Freddi Fish	PC	A yellow fish with orange fins and blue eyes. She volunteers to investigate any mystery or crime that has recently affected her friends. She often counters the crooks she catches with morals of wrongdoings.
Roysten	Goldfish	Banjo-Kazooie	Nintendo 64	Banjo's pet goldfish.
Undyne	Fish-Like Monster	Undertale	PC	A fish-like humanoid monster who leads the Royal Guard. She is rather hostile towards Frisk (unless the player befriends her in a pacifist run), the protagonist and gives cooking lessons to Papyrus.
Phangler	Anglerfish-like Monster	My Singing Monsters	Mobile Games	A monster species with the element of water and fire that sings in an autotuned fashion. When it grows up, its fins become feet and it develops a second microphone on its forehead.
Troupple King	Apple-Fish Hybrid	Shovel Knight	Various	The leader of the Troupples who treats others as mortals and himself as a god. He appears to those who seek him and carry a Troupple Chalice.
Kine	Ocean sunfish	Kirby	Various	A sunfish who is friends with Kirby. He first appeared in Kirby's Dream Land 2.
Blipper	Various	Kirby	Various	A fish enemy who wears goggles. It first appeared in Kirby's Dream Land.
Fatty Puffer	Pufferfish	Kirby's Return to Dream Land	Wii	A large pufferfish who appears as a boss in the Onion Ocean world.

== See also ==
- List of famous whales
