= List of miscellaneous fictional animals =

This list of fictional animals contains notable fictional animals of species that do not have a separate list among either the lists of fictional animals or the lists of fictional species.

== Mammals ==
=== Aardvarks ===
- Arthur Read, the titular character of books and the animation show, Arthur.
- Cerebus the Aardvark, the titular comic book character.
- Otis the Aardvark, a former puppet presenter on CBBC.
- Elmo Aardvark, an anthropomorphic aardvark of the same name.

=== Carnivorans (mostly carnivorous mammals) ===
==== Hyenas ====
- Bud and Lou, the pet hyenas of the Joker and Harley Quinn in the DC Comics universe.

==== Mongooses (including meerkats) ====
- Niko and Luna, the two mongoose protagonists in the 2024 video game Nikoderiko: The Magical World.
- Timon, a meerkat in Disney's The Lion King franchise.

=== Eulipotyphlans (hedgehogs, moles, shrews, desmans, etc.) ===
- Shadow, from the Sonic the Hedgehog series
- Sonic, from the Sonic the Hedgehog series

=== Lagomorphs (rabbits, hares, pikas) ===
- Pikachu, a large-eared pika-like Pokémon in Pokémon

=== Monotremes (platypuses, echidnas) ===
==== Platypuses ====
- Perry the Platypus ("secret agent P") from the Disney Channel series Phineas and Ferb

==== Echidnas ====
- Knuckles, an echidna from the Sonic the Hedgehog series

==== Fictional monotreme species ====
- Multiple characters belonging to the Marsupilami species, from the Belgian comic series Spirou et Fantasio and the spin-off comic series Marsupilami

=== Viverridae (civets, etc.) ===
- Deshico, a minor anthropomorphic civet character in Beastars.

=== Others ===
- Rhinogradentia, an entire fictional order of shrew-like mammals

== Non-mammal vertebrates ==
=== Amphibians ===
- Lurchi, the fire salamander mascot of the German Salamander shoe factories.
