= Threefold Recital =

2025 video game

- Developer: Everscape Games
- Publisher: indienova
- Composers: Mi Lu Music; projectlights
- Platform: Microsoft Windows
- Release: January 14, 2025
- Genres: Narrative adventure, visual novel
- Mode: Single-player

Threefold Recital is a 2025 narrative adventure indie video game developed by Everscape Games, and published by indienova. The game was released on January 14, 2025, for Microsoft Windows.

== Development ==
Threefold Recital is developed by Everscape Games, an independent game development studio from China.

== Reception ==
Reception

Aggregate scores
Aggregator	Score
Metacritic	76/100
OpenCritic	58% recommend (Note: Based on 12 reviews)

Review score
Publication	Score
XboxEra	8/10

Threefold Recital received "generally favorable" from critics, according to the review aggregation website Metacritic. Genghis Husameddin, from XboxEra, rated the game an 8, adoring the pleasant visuals and music as well as its frequent use of mini-games to pace progression, but disfavors that some of the "information presented can be a bit confusing".

VICE's Shaun Cichacki gave Threefold Recital a "Recommended" rating, praising "the high-quality art, cutesy style and plenty of tough but necessary conversations", but feels that "some of the translation feels a little stiff and off".
