= List of fictional musteloids =

Members of the Musteloidea family of carnivorans, including weasels, ferrets, minks, otters, martens, skunks, raccoons, red pandas and badgers, often appear in works of fiction as named characters. Some may be anthropomorphic while others may be depicted as more realistic animals.

== Animation ==
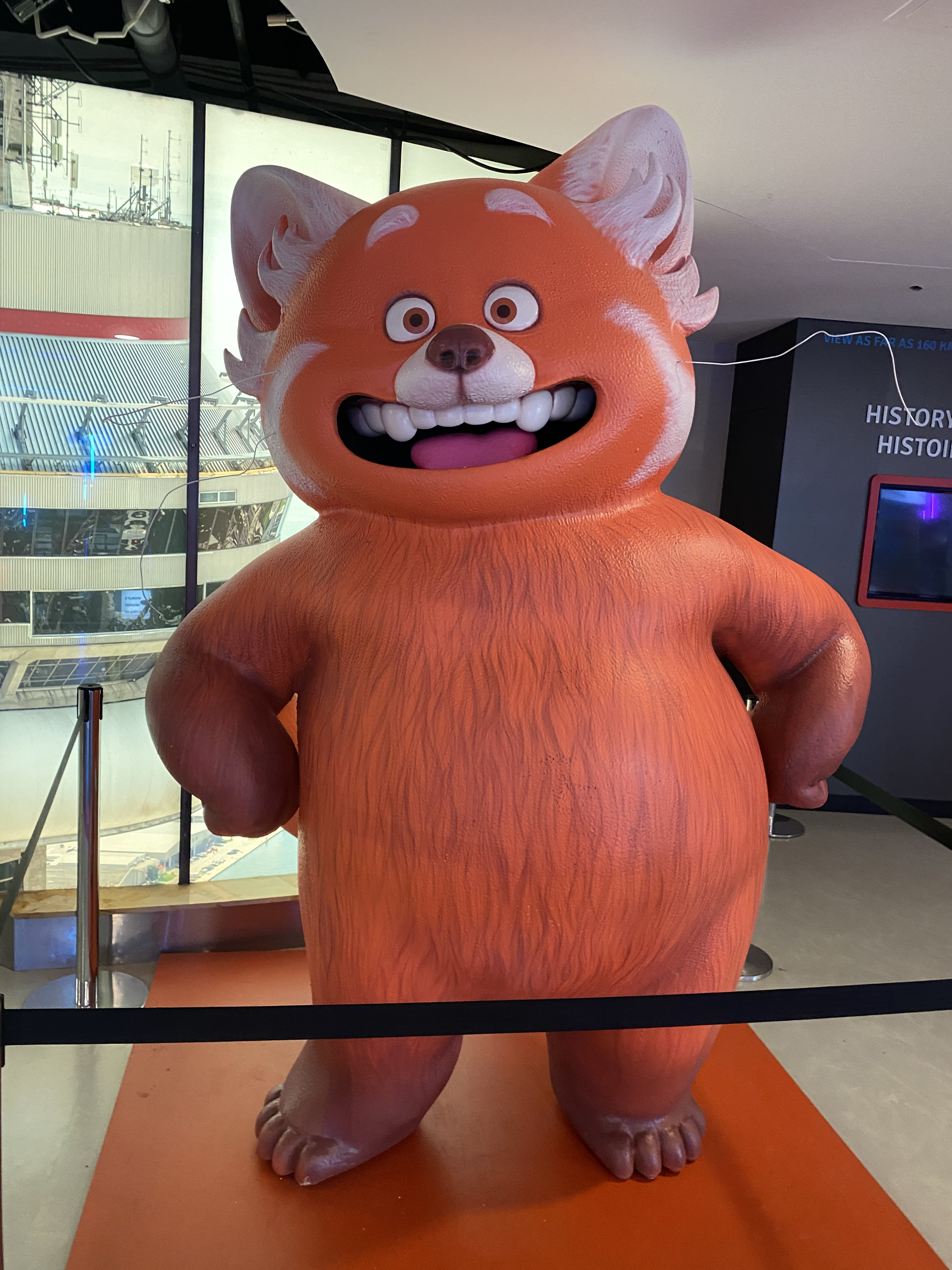
A statue of Mei Lee from Turning Red in Toronto, Ontario.

Name	Type	Work	Notes	Refs.
Becky and Stacy	American badger	The Penguins of Madagascar	A pair of female badger twins.	
Buck	Weasel	Ice Age	A weasel with a Baryonyx nemesis named Rudy.	
Carl	Raccoon	Carl the Collector	A young anthropomorphic raccoon with autism.	
Mei Lee	Red panda	Turning Red	A young girl with the ability to transform into a red panda.	
Minerva Mink	Mink	Animaniacs	A seductive anthropomorphic mink who causes cartoonish hijinks from the characters attracted to her.	
Pepé Le Pew	Striped skunk	Looney Tunes	A French anthropomorphic skunk.	
Rascal	Raccoon	Rascal the Raccoon	A raccoon adopted by a young boy, inspired by the real childhood pet of Sterling North.	
Retsuko	Red panda	Aggretsuko	An anthropomorphic red panda that sings death metal to release frustration from her job.	
Rigby	Raccoon	Regular Show	An anthropomorphic raccoon and the best friend of Mordecai the blue jay.	
Sniz & Fondue	Ferret	Sniz & Fondue	A zany pair of ferret roommates.	

== Comics ==
Name	Type	Work	Notes	Refs.
Bonobono	Sea otter	Bonobono	The sea otter protagonist of a gag manga.	
Fungo Squiggly	Ferret	Get Fuzzy	The ferret antagonist.	
Lylla	Otter	Marvel Comics	A supporting character of Rocket Raccoon.	
Miss Mam'selle Hepzibah	Skunk	Pogo	Originally Porky Pine's love interest.	
Okojo-san	Ermine	Okojo-san	A pet ermine living in an apartment complex.	
Peach	Ferret	Peach Fuzz	A pet ferret who believes herself to be a princess.	
Rocket Raccoon	Raccoon	Marvel Comics	An anthropomorphic raccoon who is a member of the Guardians of the Galaxy.	
Sabrina	Skunk	Sabrina Online	An anthropomorphic skunk who has "geeky" passion for technology like the Amiga personal computers.	

== Literature ==
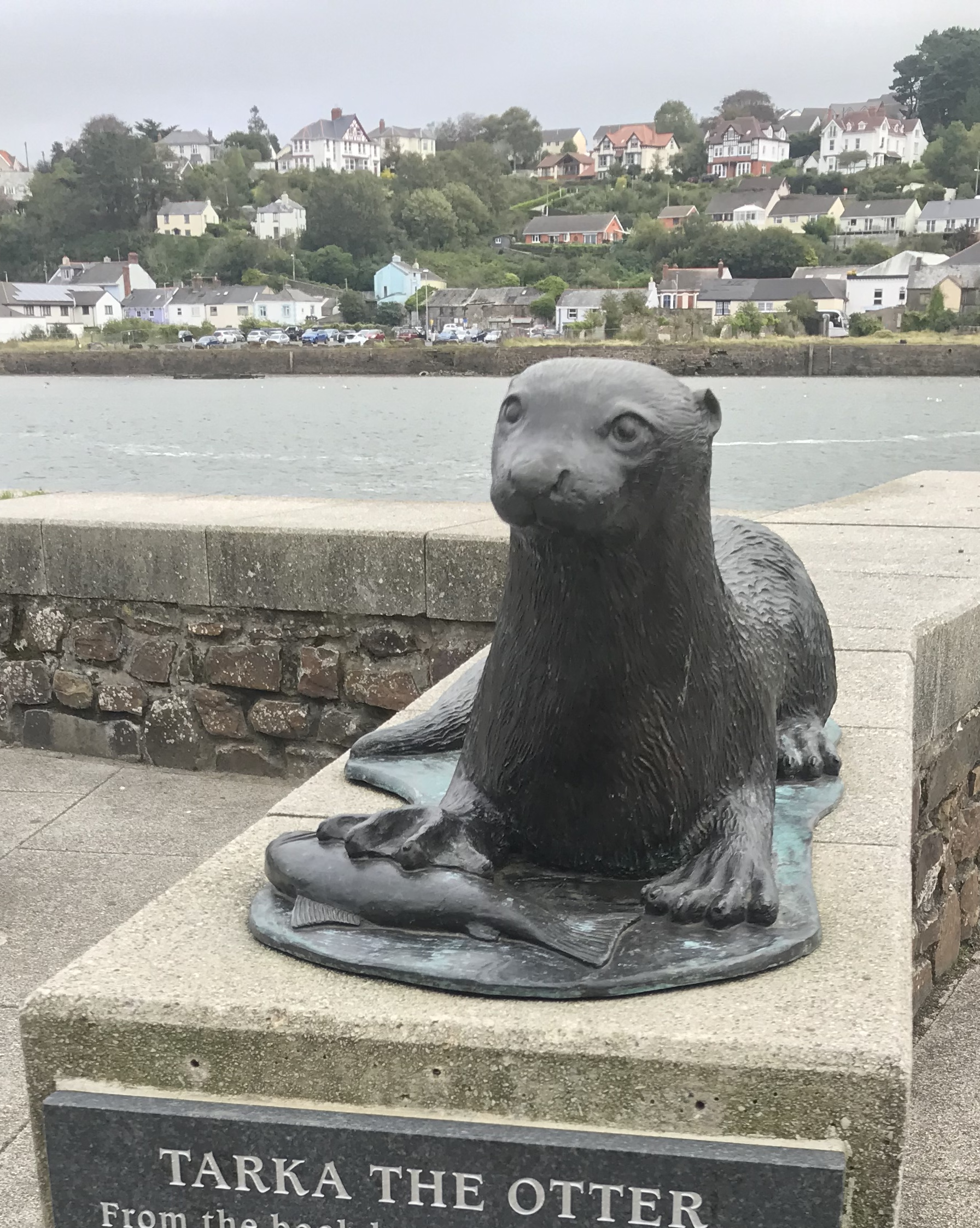
A statue of Tarka in Bideford, Devon.

Name	Type	Work	Notes	Refs.
Mr. Badger	Badger	The Wind in the Willows by Kenneth Grahame	An anthropomorphic badger who is the wise elder of his friend group.	
Mudge the Otter	Otter	Spellsinger by Alan Dean Foster	An anthropomorphic otter who is the best friend and traveling companion of Jonathan Thomas Meriweather.	
Pantalaimon	Marten	Northern Lights by Philip Pullman	A dæmon who frequently takes the form of a pine marten or an ermine.	
Sredni Vashtar	Polecat–ferret hybrid	Sredni Vashtar by Saki	The pet of a sickly 10-year-old boy that deifies the animal.	
Tarka	Eurasian otter	Tarka the Otter by Henry Williamson	An otter living in Devon.	

Note: The Ferret Chronicles has dozens of named ferret characters not listed here, and the Redwall series has hundreds of ferret, stoat, otter, and weasel characters not listed here.

== Live action ==
Name	Type	Work	Notes	Refs.
Lylla	Otter	Marvel Cinematic Universe	The film version of Lylla from Marvel Comics.	
Trufflehunter	Badger	The Chronicles of Narnia: Prince Caspian	Voiced by Ken Stott	
Rocket	Raccoon	Marvel Cinematic Universe	The film version of Rocket Raccoon from Marvel Comics.	

== Mascots ==
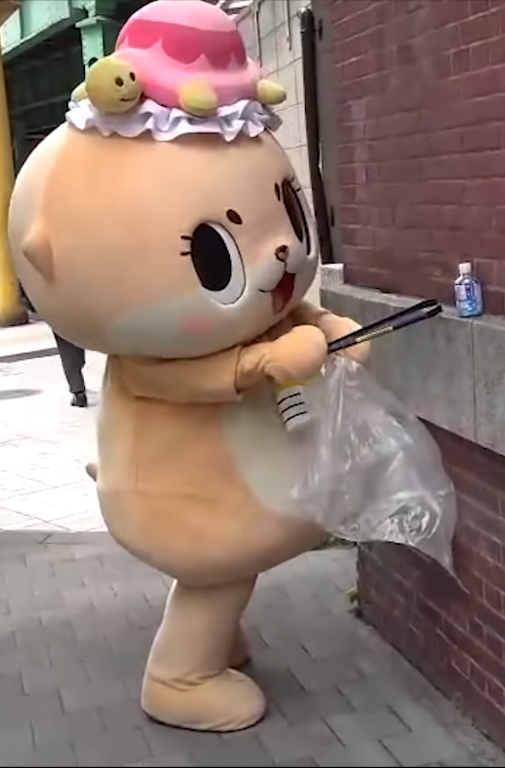
Chiitan in 2018.

Name	Type	Origin	Notes	Refs.
Bucky Badger	Badger	University of Wisconsin–Madison	The official mascot of the University of Wisconsin–Madison and Wisconsin Badgers.	
Chiitan	Asian small-clawed otter	Koh Hashibiro	An unofficial mascot of Susaki, Kōchi.	
Indi	Raccoon	Atlético Madrid	The official mascot of Atlético Madrid.	
T-Rac	Raccoon	Tennessee Titans	The official mascot of the Tennessee Titans.	
Udo	Red panda	University of Mannheim	The official mascot of the University of Mannheim.	
Roni	Raccoon	1980 Winter Olympics	An official Winter Olympic mascot.	
Otto	Sea otter	2002 Winter Paralympics	An official Paralympic mascot.	
Tina and Milo	Stoat	2026 Winter Olympics and Paralympics	Official Olympic and Paralympic mascots.	

== Video games ==
Name	Type	Work	Notes	Refs.
Koppa	Ferret	Mystery Dungeon: Shiren the Wanderer	Koppa is a talking ferret companion of Shiren the Wanderer.	
Raccoon	Raccoon	Kemono Friends	A moe raccoon girl from the Kemono Friends mobile game and anime.	
Rufus	Raccoon	Fortnite	An anthropomorphic male raccoon skin.	
Sly Cooper	Raccoon	Sly Cooper	A gentleman thief raccoon.	
Tom Nook	Raccoon	Animal Crossing	In the original Japanese versions of Animal Crossing games, Tom Nook is a tanuki, which is not a musteloid. However, he is called a raccoon in international translations.	
Typhlosion	Honey badger	Pokémon	A fire-type Pokémon species based on a honey badger.	
