= List of fictional parasites =

This list encompasses fictional characters and species who are parasites or parasitoids.

== Film ==
- Xenomorph (Alien) - The primary antagonists of the Alien franchise. Xenomorphs reproduce by infesting the bodies of others and assume some of their host's characteristics upon being born.

== Literature ==
- Brood (Marvel Comics) - An insect-like alien species who reproduce by laying their eggs in other organisms' bodies and assimilating them.
- Chimera Anima (Tokyo Mew Mew) - Blob-shaped parasitic aliens who infect animals and transform them into monstrous forms.
- Eclipso (DC Comics) - A powerful mystical entity who can possess others via the Heart of Darkness.
- Mummudrai (Marvel Comics) - A species from another dimension who have no physical form and parasitize the bodies of others to form a body. Cassandra Nova, an enemy of the X-Men, is a mummudrai who formed her body by absorbing Charles Xavier's DNA.
- Parallax (DC Comics) - An insect-like entity who embodies fear and can possess the bodies of others.
- Sublime (Marvel Comics) - A sentient bacterial colony created by the Threshold that can possess the bodies of others. Mutants are immune to its control.
- Symbiote (Marvel Comics) - A slime-like alien species who can bond with other organisms, giving them superhuman abilities. Some symbiotes influence the minds of their hosts, driving them to commit actions that they otherwise would not.
- Yeerk (Animorphs) - A blind, slug-like alien species who can possess organisms by entering their body and wrapping around their brain.

== Video games ==
- NE-α type parasite (Resident Evil 3: Nemesis) - A genetically engineered parasite with the ability to take control over its host's body by acting as their brain and it's this parasite that was used to create the Nemesis T-Type Tyrant.
- Las plagas (Resident Evil 4) - Parasitic organisms that can take control over their host's mind by attaching themselves onto their nervous system.
- Aparoid (Star Fox: Assault) - Cybernetic insect-like aliens who can infect and control the bodies of others.
- Headcrab (Half-Life) - A crab-like alien that latches on to the host's head and zombifies them.
- Metroid (Metroid) - A jellyfish-like species created by the Chozo to combat the X Parasites.
- X Parasite (Metroid) - An alien species whose bodies are shaped like the letter "X". They are able to assimilate the DNA and abilities of their hosts.
- Bugsnax (Bugsnax) - Bugsnax are insect-food hybrids that inhabit Snaktooth Island. When eaten, they transform part of the consumer's body into food. Later in the game, it is revealed that the Bugsnax are parasitic and transform anyone who regularly consumes them into more Bugsnax.

== Television ==
- Baby (Dragon Ball GT) - A parasitic alien created using the DNA of the Tuffle king.
- Bezoar (Buffy the Vampire Slayer) - An insect-like species that can control the bodies of others by attaching to their necks.
- Slime-Biot (Ben 10) - A squid-like species created by the Contumelia at the beginning of the universe to spread DNA and enable the evolution of life. Skurd, one of the Slime-Biots, bonds with Ben Tennyson, giving him the ability to create weapons based on his alien transformations.
- Unity (Superman: The Animated Series) - An alien that can assimilate humans into its hive mind.
- Xenocite (Ben 10) - A squid-like species created by the Highbreed to infect others and transform them into creatures known as DNAliens.
