= Fictional depictions of worms =

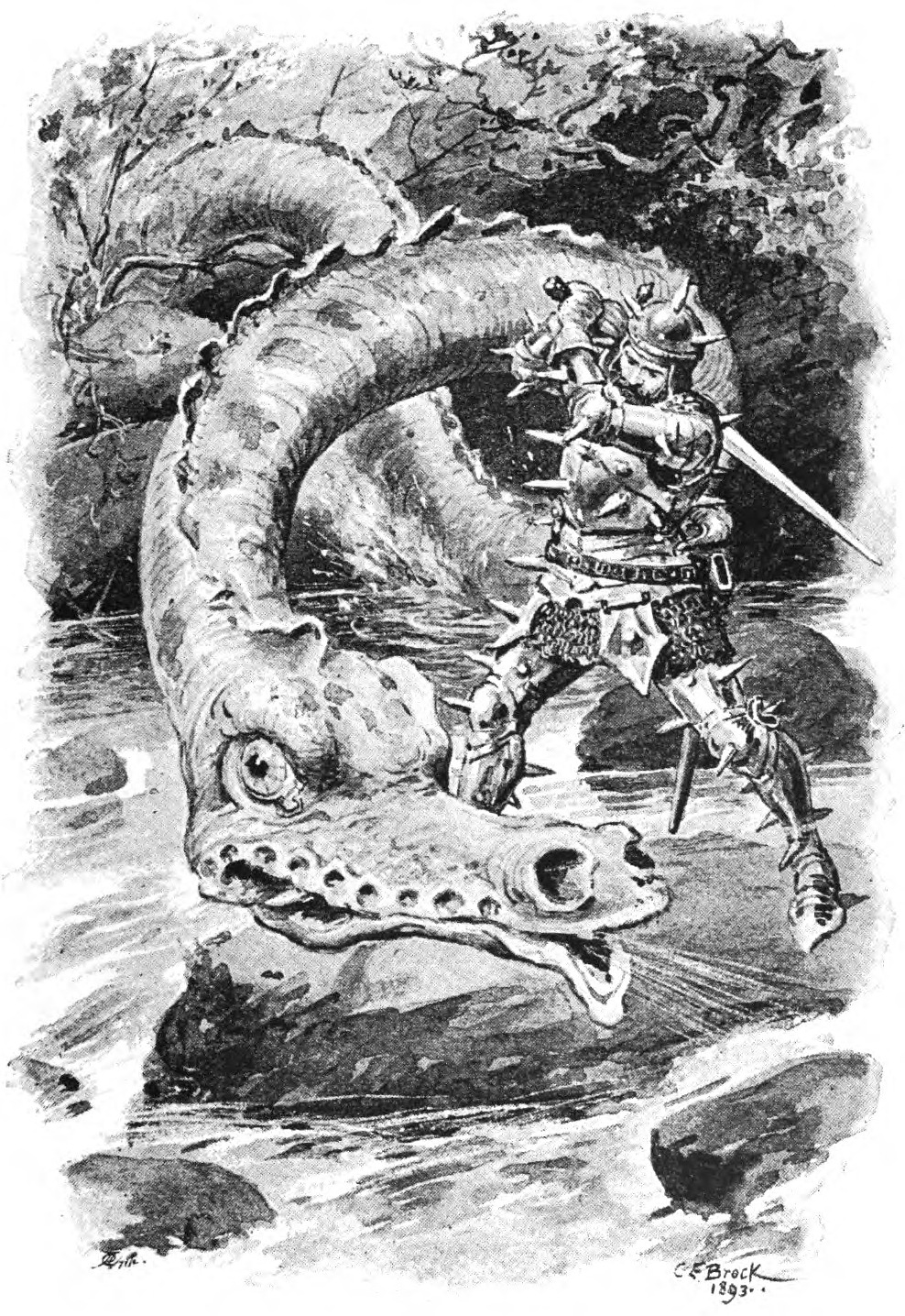
The Lambton Worm

Worms have played major roles in world mythology and its associated literatures. The word was often used to describe creatures now classified as snakes, lindworms, serpents and dragons. Its symbolic meaning is divided between death and renewal. They continue to play mixed roles in modern cultures.

The current usage of worm as a type of malicious Internet software is derived from John Brunner's 1975 science fiction novel The Shockwave Rider. On Pink Floyd's album The Wall, worms were used as "symbols of negative forces within ourselves." Some mythological and fantastic creatures descend from the Old English word "wyrm", a poetic term for a legless serpent or dragon (particularly in Germanic cultures).

Although more usually used in the context of earthworms, the English word "worm" derives from Old Norse orm and Old English wyrm, which could also mean "serpent" or "dragon". The synonymous usage of worm and dragon in English lessened during the following centuries. Samuel Johnson's dictionary drew a distinction between worms and dragons (while retaining the word serpent as a definition of worm) and the last synonymous usage of worm and dragon as noted in the Oxford English Dictionary dates to the 17th century.

== Mythology and legends ==
- The Lambton Worm, of 15th-century English legend, also made into an opera by Robert Sherlaw Johnson.
- The Worm of Sockburn, of 14th-century English legend.
- The Worm of Linton, of 12th-century Scottish legend.
- The Laidley Worm of Bamburgh.
- The Mongolian Death Worm, a cryptozoological creature reported to exist in the Gobi Desert.
- The Stoor worm, of Orcadian folklore.

== Literature ==
- Lewis Carroll's poem "Jabberwocky" tells the story of the killing of a giant worm called Jabberwock. It was included in his famous 1871 novel "Through the Looking Glass."
- The Lair of the White Worm is a 1911 novel by Bram Stoker, made into a 1988 film by director Ken Russell.
- Fafnir, a beast slain during the course of the Völsungasaga, is a worm in William Morris's rendition.
- The Worm Ouroboros, a 1922 fantasy novel by E. R. Eddison, invokes an ancient myth of a legless creature that eats its own tail.
- H. P. Lovecraft's fiction contains several monstrous worms and worm-like creatures such as Rlim Shaikorth and The Worm that Gnaws in the Night.
- "The Coming of the White Worm" is a 1941 short story by Clark Ashton Smith.
- J.R.R. Tolkien refers to his creation Glaurung as 'The Great Worm'. This term was adopted by hackers to describe the Morris Worm.
  - Also in Tolkien's The Hobbit, creatures called Wereworms are mentioned, although they don't appear in the book, nor in any other book of Tolkien. They appear, however, in Peter Jackson third film of Hobbit adaption.
- Sandworms play a major role in the 1965 science fiction novel Dune by Frank Herbert and in its film and TV adaptations (Dune universe).
- "In the House of the Worm" is a 1976 short story by George R. R. Martin.
- The Conqueror Worms is a 2006 novel by Brian Keene. The title is a reference to Edgar Allan Poe's 1845 poem "The Conqueror Worm".
- "The Worm of the World's End" is an apocalyptic being first mentioned in The One Tree, Book 2 of the second trilogy of The Chronicles of Thomas Covenant, the Unbeliever fantasy series written by Stephen R. Donaldson.
- Diary of a Worm (2003), written by Doreen Cronin and illustrated by Harry Bliss, is a journalistic account of a worm's daily life.
- Lowly Worm is a fictional character that makes frequent appearances in Richard Scarry's children's books.
- Flobberworms are dull, worm-like magical creatures in the Harry Potter universe.
- César Aira's "The Literary Conference" (2010) features giant blue worms, the product of a science experiment gone awry, that destructively tumble down mountains toward the Venezuelan town below.
- Daniel Pinkwater's 1981 novel The Worms of Kukumlima features giant intelligent earthworms who live in an extinct volcano and collect "elephant mice".
- The Middengard Wyrm (A Court of Thorns and Roses) is a gigantic, blind worm monster that navigates by scent, and is described as being pinkish-brown and having an enormous mouth filled with rows of sharp teeth. It is killed by the main character of the series, Feyre, who evades its senses by covering herself in mud, and then lures it into a trap made of the bones of its previous victims.

== Television, music, and film ==
- In the Star Wars universe, space slugs, also called exogorths or "giant asteroid worms", are silicon-based gastropods, capable of surviving in a vacuum. First seen in The Empire Strikes Back.
- The Graboids in the Tremors films and television series.
- Jeff, the giant subway worm in the film Men in Black II.
- The ghost-eating sandworms in the film Beetlejuice.
- A family of worms in Jim Davis' comic strip U.S. Acres
- The giant worm-demon in S7 E2 of Buffy the Vampire Slayer
- A giant maggot/worm in the cult film Galaxy of Terror.
- Regulan bloodworms are a species in the Star Trek universe.
- In the 2005 film King Kong, a giant bloodworm-like predator called the carnictis lives in the rents and chasms of Skull Island.
- Alien Chestbursters from the Alien series
- Doctor Worm, the titular character in the They Might Be Giants song, a worm that can play the drums. Featured on Nickelodeon's KaBlam!
- Alaskan Bull Worm from the television show SpongeBob SquarePants.
- The Bookworm, a supporting character in Warner Brothers' Sniffles cartoons.
- Bookworm, a toy worm at Sunnyside Daycare from Toy Story 3 who keeps a library of different toy instruction manuals.
- Evil Jim, Earthworm Jim's evil Doppelgänger from the Earthworm Jim TV series.
- Mr. Mind, the nemesis of DC's Captain Marvel, who appears in the middle of the closing credits of Shazam! (film).
- Slimey, pet of Sesame Street's Oscar the Grouch.
- Shelby, the worm who lives in Jake's viola in Adventure Time.
- The king worm who traps Finn in a dream from Adventure Time.
- Trill symbionts are worm like aliens in Star Trek.
- The worm in Corpse Bride.

== Video games ==
- Thresher Maw, an alien earthworm from the Mass Effect trilogy.
- Annelids, from System Shock 2.
- Earthworm Jim, the protagonist of the video game series with the same name.
- Mindworms, from Sid Meier's Alpha Centauri.
- Moldorm, from The Legend of Zelda and its sequels.
- The Pit Worm and Geneworm from Half-Life: Opposing Force.
- Sandworms, from the Dune computer and video games.
- Sandworms, from the Diablo I, Diablo II, and Diablo III computer and video games.
- Sandworms, from the Final Fantasy series.
- The eponymous worms from the Worms series.
- Zerg larvae, Nydus worms, and Cerebrates from StarCraft.
- Rockworms and the Riftworm from Gears of War 2.
- Molgera, a boss from The Legend of Zelda: The Wind Waker.
- Magmaw, a boss from World of Warcraft: Cataclysm.
- The Neurax Worm, a plague type from Plague Inc. and Plague Inc. Evolved.
- Baron Nashor, a giant worm from League of Legends.
- Split Worm, an enormous worm that appears in Silent Hill 3.
- Xol, Will of the Thousands, a worm god in Destiny 2.
- The Magma Worm, a giant serpent creature made of magma from Risk of Rain and Risk of Rain 2.
- The Pale King, from Hollow Knight, who was originally a giant wormlike creature.
- The Giant Sandworm, a boss in Ori and the Will of the Wisps.
- The Carthus Sand Worm, a miniboss in Dark Souls III.
- The Eater Of Worlds, a boss in Terraria.
- The Lekgolo, a species of colonial worms which operate machinery as a hive, from the Halo franchise.
- The Ice Worm, a large hostile creature in Subnautica: Below Zero.
- Rafta, a character who has been turned into a worm and who has a side quest in Look Outside. If you finish her side quest, another worm named Kevin will end up spawning with a shop.

== See also ==
- List of dragons in fiction
