= List of fictional ungulates in literature =

This list of fictional ungulates in literature is a subsidiary to the list of fictional ungulates and list of fictional animals. The list is restricted to notable ungulate (hooved) characters from various works of literature. This list includes deer, moose, cattle, giraffes, camels, donkeys, sheep, goats and zebras, but excluding horses, pachyderms and pigs, which are listed in separate lists.

== Deer and moose ==
Name	Species	Author	Work	Notes
Bambi	Roe Deer	Felix Salten	Bambi, A Life in the Woods	
Elliot	Moose	Andrea Beck	Elliot Moose	
Faline	Roe Deer	Felix Salten	Bambi, A Life in the Woods	
Great Prince	Roe Deer	Felix Salten	Bambi, A Life in the Woods	
Rannoch	Red deer	David Clement-Davies	Fire Bringer	
Rudolph	Reindeer	Robert L. May	Rudolph the Red-Nosed Reindeer	A reindeer originally from the 1939 story 'Rudolph the Red-Nosed Reindeer', later adapted to a 1949 song, a 1964 television special, and various derivative works.

== Equines ==
=== Donkeys ===
Name	Author	Work	Notes
Benjamin	George Orwell	Animal Farm	
Candlewick	Carlo Collodi	The Adventures of Pinocchio	Boy who turns into a donkey
Eeyore	A. A. Milne	Winnie-the-Pooh	A gloomy, pessimistic donkey, but a true friend of Pooh's.
Puzzle	C. S. Lewis	The Chronicles of Narnia	

=== Zebras ===
Name	Species	Author	Work	Notes
Zigby	Zebra	Brian Paterson	Zigby	

== Sheep and goats ==
- The Ram (Le Mouton), French literary fairy tale by author Madame d'Aulnoy, wherein a prince is cursed into a sheep form by a jealous fairy.
