= List of fictional ungulates =

This list of fictional ungulates is a subsidiary to the list of fictional animals. The list is restricted to notable ungulate (hooved) characters from various works organized by medium. This paraphyletic list includes all fictional hooved characters except fictional horses, fictional elephants, and fictional swine, as each has its own list.

== Literature ==
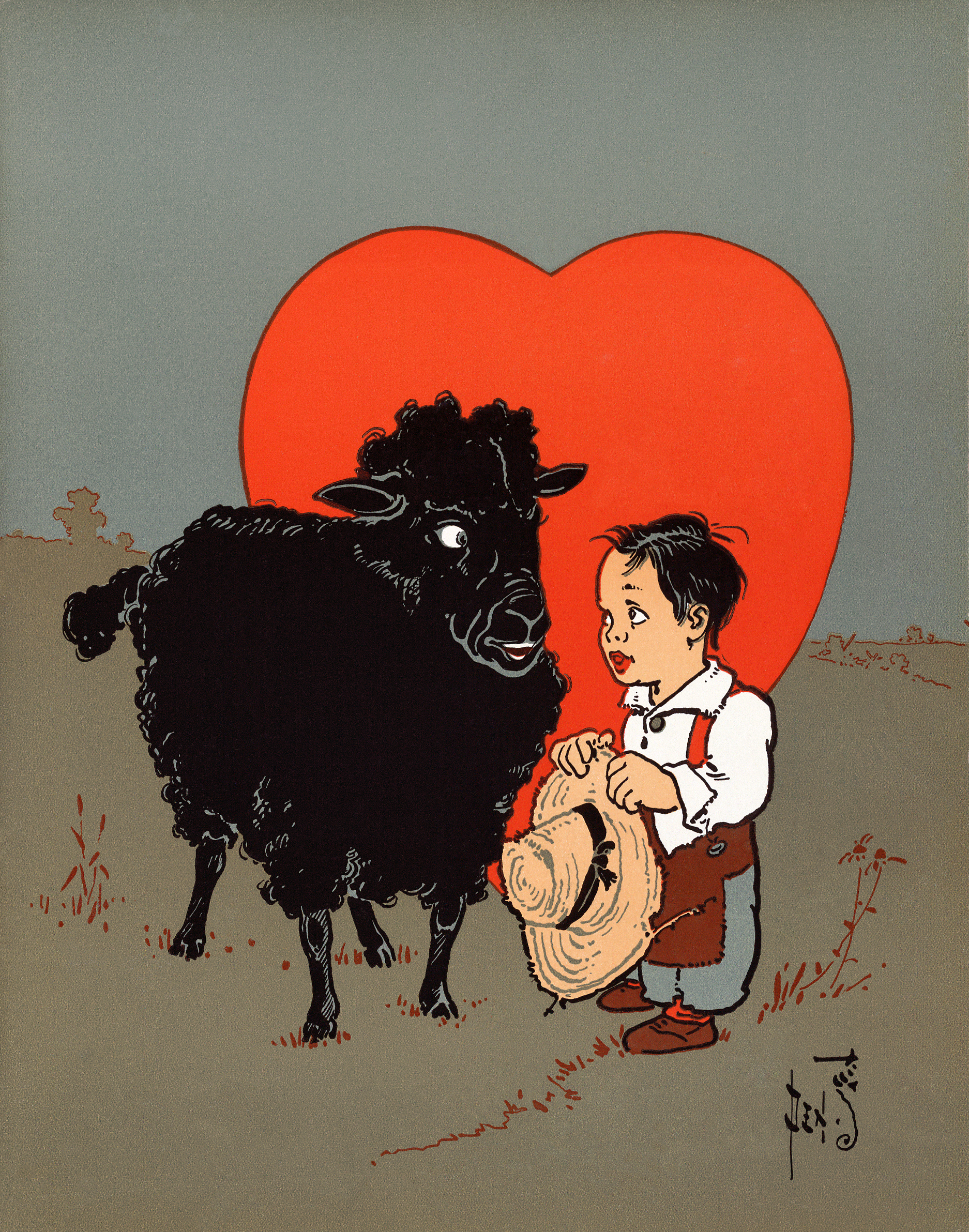
"Baa, Baa, Black Sheep", from a 1901 illustration by William Wallace Denslow

Name	Species	Work	Author	Notes
Bambi	Roe deer	Bambi, A Life in the Woods	Felix Salten	In the Disney films his species was changed to the white-tailed deer, which would be more familiar to American audiences. His image is a Disney icon, comparable to the recognition of Jiminy Cricket or Tinkerbell, and he is even shown on Disney stock certificates.
Benjamin	A donkey, and one of the main characters.	Animal Farm	George Orwell	
Candlewick	Donkey	The Adventures of Pinocchio	Carlo Collodi	A human boy turned into a donkey.
Conselheiro	Donkey	Sítio do Picapau Amarelo	Monteiro Lobato	A talking donkey.
The Deer without a Heart	Deer	Aesop's Fables	Aesop	
Eeyore	Donkey	Winnie-the-Pooh	A. A. Milne	
Ferdinand the Bull	Bull	The Story of Ferdinand	Munro Leaf and Robert Lawson	Eponymous character; pacifist forced into bullfighting.
Geoffrey	Giraffe	Toys R Us	Dr. G. Raffe	
Giraffe	Giraffe	The Giraffe and the Pelly and Me	Roald Dahl	Giraffe who works together with a pelican and a monkey as a window cleaner.
Lord Rataxes	Rhinoceros	Jean de Brunhoff	Babar the Elephant	Major character, monarch of Rhinoland.
Otto	Rhinoceros	Ole Lund Kirkegaard	Otto Is a Rhinoceros	Major character in the novel.
Pete	Sheep	Pete the Sheep	Jackie French	A sheep who acts like a sheep dog.
Puzzle	Donkey	The Chronicles of Narnia	C. S. Lewis	
Rudolph	Reindeer	Rudolph the Red-Nosed Reindeer	Robert L. May	A reindeer originally from the 1939 story 'Rudolph the Red-Nosed Reindeer', later adapted to a 1949 song, a 1964 television special, and various derivative works.
Strorks	Rhinoceros	Rudyard Kipling	Just So Stories	In "How the Rhinoceros Got His Skin".
Woolly	Sheep	When Sheep Can't Sleep	Satoshi Kitamura	
Zigby	Zebra	Zigby	Brian Paterson	

=== Comics ===
Name	Species	Origin	Creator	Notes
Anatole	Donkey	Philémon	Fred	Philémon's pet and best friend.
Bella	Cow	Jommeke	Jef Nys	A cow who enjoys dancing to music.
Billy Goat	Goat	Rupert Bear	Alfred Bestall	Cousin of The Wise Old Goat.
Biquette	Goat	Johan and Peewit	Peyo	Peewit's female pet goat, which he uses as a horse.
Boes	Ox	Boes (Ox Tales)	Wil Raymakers and Thijs Wilms	An anthropomorphic ox who works as a farmer and walks on clogs.
Brainy-Yak	Yak	Just'a Lotta Animals	Roy Thomas and Scott Shaw	An animal version of Brainiac.
Butter	Goat	The Timbertoes	John Gee	The family's goat.
Cecil	Sheep	Footrot Flats	Murray Ball	An aged stud ram.
Chef Gustav	Goat	The Ongoing Adventures of Rocket Llama	Alex Langley	A war veteran.
Dannie	Zebra	Dannie ben ik	Emile Brumsteede	An anthropomorphic zebra.
Derek	Sheep	Derek the Sheep	Gary Northfield	
Dirk Dickerdack	Hippopotamus	Tom Poes	Marten Toonder	The mayor of Rommeldam.
Grandma Goat	Goat	Rupert Bear	Alfred Bestall	Sister of the Wise Old Goat.
Hieronymus (Hip) Flask	Hippopotamus/human hybrid	Elephantmen	Richard Starkings	Created by The MAPPO Corporation; IA advisor.
Hippo	Hippopotamus	Marvel Comics	Brian Reed, Chris Bachalo, Tim Townsend	A hippopotamus who was mutated into an anthropomorphic form by the High Evolutionary.
Hippo	Hippopotamus	Jungle Jinks	Arthur White and Mabel F. Taylor	A little school child and main cast member.
Mrs. Hippo	Hippopotamus	The Bruin Boys, aka Tiger Tim	Julius Stafford Baker	A female teacher; later renamed to Mrs. Bruin and species-swapped into a bear.
Horrors Greeley	Cow	Pogo	Walt Kelly	A freckled cow who travels westward. His name is a pun on Horace Greeley.
Kuksi	Donkey	Kuksi	Victor Vashi	Main character in a cartoon animal comic.
Look-Out	Giraffe	Boner's Ark	Mort Walker	One of the passengers aboard of Boner's ark.
Het Paard van Sinterklaas	Donkey	The Adventures of Nero	Marc Sleen	A black donkey used by Sinterklaas, which nevertheless claims he is a horse.
Obadiah Horn	Rhinoceros/human hybrid	Elephantmen	Richard Starkings	A businessman, created by The MAPPO Corporation.
Reinhold	Rhinoceros	Reinhold das Nashorn, a pantomime comic	Vicco von Bülow, better known as Loriot	
Rocket Llama	Llama	The Ongoing Adventures of Rocket Llama	Alex Langley	Eponymous character of the webcomic.
Romuald	Sheep	Le Génie des Alpages	F'Murr	Conceited and disrespected black ram, major character.
Serow	Serow	A Serow's Deadly Fall	Kamoshika Tenrakushii	
Joachim Sickbock	Goat	Tom Poes	Marten Toonder	A mad scientist and recurring villain.
Tombed-Camionette	Suffolk sheep	Le Génie des Alpages	F'Murr	A sheep who fell from a truck, hence his name. He acts like a stereotypical Englishman.
Uncle Antler	Moose	Pogo	Walt Kelly	
Willy	Giraffe	The Bruin Boys, aka Tiger Tim	Julius Stafford Baker	One of Tiger Tim's friends.
The Wise Old Goat	Goat	Rupert Bear	Mary Tourtel	An advisor and help to Rupert.
Zebra	Zebra	Pearls Before Swine comic strips		A zebra who unsuccessfully tries to promote harmony between zebras and predators.
Zulma	Goat	Kramikske	Jean-Pol	The pet goat of Bertje; flies by rotating its tail.

=== Mythology ===
Name	Species	Myth	Notes
Ceryneian Hind	Deer	Greek	Also called Cerynitis, the Ceryneian Hind is an enormous deer who lives in Keryneia, Greece. It is sacred to Artemis, the chaste goddess of the hunt, animals and unmarried women. It possesses golden antlers and hooves of bronze or brass, and is said to be able to outrun an arrow in flight. The capture of the hind was one of The Twelve Labors of Hercules.
Khnum	Ram	Ancient Egyptian	
Ox	Ox	Chinese	The second of the Chinese zodiac years.
Goat/Sheep	Goat or Sheep	Chinese	The eighth of the Chinese zodiac years.
Babe the Blue Ox	Ox	United States & Canada	Companion to Paul Bunyan, the giant lumberjack of folklore.
Taweret	Goddess with hippo features.	Ancient Egyptian religion	The protective goddess of childbirth and fertility, typically depicted as a bipedal female hippopotamus with feline attributes, pendulous female human breasts, the limbs and paws of a lion, and the back and tail of a Nile crocodile.

== Media ==
=== Radio ===
Name	Species	Work	Notes
Kim De Hert	Deer	Het Leugenpaleis	A deer who was made into a hunter's trophy and apparently appeared in the studio as nothing more than a head stuck on a piece of wood. He always claimed to be from a mansion in 's-Gravenwezel and was played by Hugo Matthysen.

=== Film ===
Name	Species	Work	Notes
Cardigan	Sheep	Charlotte's Web 2: Wilbur's Great Adventure	Friend of Wilbur, major character. Voiced by Harrison Chad.
Chief Bogo	African buffalo	Zootopia	Police chief of the Zootopia Police Department's First Precinct.
Chirin	Sheep	Ringing Bell	A baby lamb who seeks revenge for the death of his mother by a wolf.
Daisy	Sheep	Everything You Always Wanted to Know About Sex* (*But Were Afraid to Ask)	A ewe who becomes the object of affection of a New York City physician.
Donkey	Donkey	Shrek	A talkative miniature donkey who accompanies Shrek on his adventures. Voiced by Eddie Murphy.
Heidi	Hippo	Meet the Feebles	An anthropomorphic hippopotamus character in the Meet The Feebles movie.
Jerome	Giraffe	The Friendly Giant	Puppet ungulate, friend of the Giant.
Maa	Sheep	Babe	An old ewe on Hoggett Farm voiced by Miriam Flynn.
Marty	Zebra	Madagascar	Main character, attempting to return home with the rest. Voiced by Chris Rock.
Melman	Giraffe	Madagascar	Main character, worrisome and sensitive. Voiced by David Schwimmer.
Mollie	Giraffe	Zookeeper	A reticulated giraffe in Franklin Park Zoo. Voiced by Maya Rudolph.
Prancer	Reindeer	Prancer	A wounded reindeer believed to belong to Santa. Live-action.
Rocky	Indian Rhinoceros	The Jungle Book	
Stripes	Zebra	Racing Stripes	Live-action.
Sven	Reindeer	Frozen	A reindeer and the companion of Kristoff from the Frozen franchise.

=== Television ===
Name	Species	Program	Notes
Alexis	Giraffe	Jim Henson's Animal Show	A puppet giraffe
Andrew	Reindeer	Jim Henson's Animal Show	A puppet reindeer
Baby Lamb	Sheep	Baby Einstein	A puppet sheep who hosts Lullaby Time.
Charlie	Chamois	Jim Henson's Animal Show	A puppet chamois
Custer	Bison	Jim Henson's Animal Show	A puppet bison
Dash	Donkey	Big Barn Farm	A live-action donkey.
MacDonald	Cow	Baby Einstein	A Holstein female with three different puppets; hosts Baby MacDonald.
Ewenice	Sheep	Big Barn Farm	A live-action sheep.
Gobo	Goat	Big Barn Farm	A live-action goat.
Colambo	Sheep	Sesame Street	Detective, reference to Columbo.
Cowbella	Cow	Jim Henson's Pajanimals	Puppet ungulate.
Doreen	Camel	Jim Henson's Animal Show	A puppet camel.
Elliot	Moose	Elliot Moose	A puppet ungulate.
Frankie	Wildebeest	Jim Henson's Animal Show	A puppet wildebeest
George	Hippo	Rainbow	A pink hippo with blue eyes. A puppet character.
George	Hippo	George and Martha	Eponymous male main character.
Gladys	Cow	Sesame Street	A cow who dreams of being a singer and actress.
Harry	Rhinoceros	Jim Henson's Animal Show	A puppet rhinoceros
Henrietta Hippo	Hippo	New Zoo Revue	
Hopisu	Hippo	Mimocan Her Yerde	A blue hippo from the turkish puppet show Mimocan Her Yerde, also known as Haberlik.
Lamb Chop	Sheep	Various Shari Lewis shows	A puppet ewe.
Madam	Cattle	Big Barn Farm	A live-action cow.
Martha	Hippo	George and Martha	Eponymous female main character.
Mickey Moose	Moose	The Muppet Show	A parody version of Mickey Mouse; only appeared in the episode starring Petula Clark.
Monica	Musk ox	Jim Henson's Animal Show	A puppet musk ox
Mr. Moose	Moose	Captain Kangaroo	A puppet moose.
Muffin	Mule	Muffin the Mule	Puppet ungulate.
Necktie	Giraffe	Wild Kratts	Named as such due to being "tangled" with the hosts during their first encounter.
Nuzzle and Scratch	Alpaca	Nuzzle and Scratch	A pair of alpaca puppets.
Perry	Przewalski's horse	Jim Henson's Animal Show	A puppet Przewalski's horse.
Phoenicia	Hippopotamus	Jim Henson's Animal Show	
Ralph	Moose	Jim Henson's Animal Show	A puppet moose
Randall	Zebra	Jim Henson's Animal Show	A puppet zebra
Robert	Red deer	Jim Henson's Animal Show	A puppet red deer
Rocky	Bighorn sheep	Jim Henson's Animal Show	A puppet bighorn sheep
Shaun	Sheep	Shaun the Sheep	A stop-motion sheep. First appeared in the Wallace and Gromit short A Close Shave.
Tommy	Thomson's gazelle	Jim Henson's Animal Show	A puppet Thomson's gazelle
Travis	African buffalo	Jim Henson's Animal Show	
Wilbur	Cattle	Wilbur	A puppet calf.
Zaza	Zebra	De Fabeltjeskrant	A puppet zebra.
Woolma Lamb	Sheep	The Get Along Gang	Main character.

== Video games ==
Name	Species	Origin	Notes
Arizona	Cattle	Them's Fightin' Herds	A playable calf fighter.
Asgore Dreemurr	Goat	Undertale, Deltarune	The king of the Underground and monsters; antagonist in Undertale, supporting character in Deltarune.
Asriel Dreemurr	Goat	Undertale, Deltarune	The biological child of Toriel and Asgore; the true final boss of Undertale, in which he is also the former identity of main antagonist Flowey, though he makes no physical appearance as himself until the end.
Aurochs	Aurochs	Kemono Friends	An aurochs Friend who appears in multiple Kemono Friends media including the 2017 anime and multiple mobile games.
Baba Chops	Sheep	Poppy Playtime	Antagonistic black-and-white plush doll.
Bambo	Deer	Deer Avenger	The protagonist of the Deer Avenger series of video games.
Bleatnik	Goat	My Singing Monsters	
Carol Holiday	Reindeer	Deltarune	Mother of Noelle; minor antagonist.
Cow	Cow	Mario series	Playable character in Mario Kart World.
Cyrus	Alpaca	Animal Crossing series	Works at Re-Tail with Reese, his wife and his business partner. He is the upholsterer and is in charge of altering furniture, but his services are not accessible right from the start.
Dalai Llama	Llama	Brutal: Paws of Fury	Llama Belt of Heaven
Deer Lord	Deer	Spooky's Jump Scare Mansion	Alternitavely known as Specimen 8.
Gannan Yak	Gannan yak	Kemono Friends	Appears in the Kemono Friends 3 video game.
The Goat	Goat	Cult of the Lamb	
Mr. Hippo	Hippopotamus	Freddy Fazbear's Pizzeria Simulator	A purple hippopotamus animatronic who serves in the "Mediocre Melodies" act; tends to ramble.
Holstein Friesian Cattle	Holstein Friesian cattle	Kemono Friends	Fictional ungulate.
Jean Bison	American bison	Sly 2: Band of Thieves	Villain; voiced by Ross Douglas.
The Lamb	Lamb	Cult of the Lamb	
Lammy	Sheep	Um Jammer Lammy and PaRappa the Rapper	Guitarist in the band MilkCan and the protagonist of Um Jammer Lammy.
Miltank	Cow	Pokémon	Normal type Pokémon introduced in Pokémon Gold/Silver/Crystal.
Mira	Sheep	Anomaly Collapse	A playable sheep physician.
Mooshroom	Cow	Minecraft	A rare species of cattle that have mushrooms growing from their bodies. Naturally red, when struck by lightning, the red mushrooms turn brown. The red variant may be milked for mushroom stew, and the brown variant may be milked for "suspicious stews", which when consumed give the player certain effects.
Murray	Hippopotamus	Sly Cooper	Main character, serves as fighter and getaway driver.
Noelle Holiday	Reindeer	Deltarune	Major character; freezes the enemy.
Ovis	Sheep	Ark: Survival Evolved	A species of sheep that can be tamed by the player and slaughtered and harvested for its mutton.
Paprika	Alpaca	Them's Fightin' Herds	A playable alpaca fighter.
Pilgor	Goat	Goat Simulator	Playable character; gains points through destruction.
Pom	Sheep	Them's Fightin' Herds	A playable lamb fighter.
Rambi	Rhinoceros	Donkey Kong Country	
Ralsei	Goat	Deltarune	One of the three main characters.
Reese	Alpaca	Animal Crossing: New Leaf, Animal Crossing: Happy Home Designer	Works at Re-Tail with her husband, Cyrus; serves primarily economic purposes.
Roaring Knight	Reindeer	Deltarune	The main antagonist.
Rudy Holiday	Reindeer	Deltarune	Father of Noelle Holiday; bedridden with illness.
Shanty	Goat	Them's Fightin' Herds	A playable goat fighter.
Tauros	Bull	Pokémon	Normal type, debuted in the first Generation.
Tianhuo	Longma	Them's Fightin' Herds	A playable longma fighter.
Toriel Dreemurr	Goat	Undertale, Deltarune	Tutorial character and first boss of Undertale, mother of the player character in Deltarune; ex-wife of Asgore in both games.
Velvet	Reindeer	Them's Fightin' Herds	A playable reindeer fighter.
Wooloo	Sheep	Pokémon	Normal type, debuted in the eighth Generation.

== Advertising mascots ==
Name	Species	Brand	Notes
Joe Camel	Camel	Camel cigarettes	Cartoon Camel mascot from 1987 to 1997.
Fu Niu Lele	Cattle	2008 Summer Paralympics in Beijing	Official mascot
Chick-Fil-A Cows	Cattle	Chick-Fil-A	Marketing ploy.
Geoffrey the Giraffe	Giraffe	Toys "R" Us	Mascot
Yipes	Zebra	Fruit Stripe	Mascot for Fruit Stripe gum
Si Jerapah	Giraffe	Roti Jerapah	Mascot for an Indonesian bakery
Shortie Giraffe	Giraffe	Cocoa Krispies	Friend of the mascot Coco the Monkey
Pepe	Zebra	Azucaradas	Mascot for the Mexican breakfast cereal Azucaradas
Artie Antlers	Moose	Chuck E. Cheese's Pizza Time Theatre	A piano-playing moose during the early years of Chuck E. Cheese's.
Zen	Zebra	Zebra	Mascot for Zebra brand pens

== Sports team mascots ==
Name	Species	Brand	Notes
Benny	Bull	Chicago Bulls	Mascot
Bongo	Deer	Milwaukee Bucks	Mascot
Mariner	Moose	Seattle Mariners	Mascot
Mick E. Moose	Moose	Winnipeg Jets	Mascot

== Others ==
- Dolli Dimples, a female piano playing hippo at Chuck E. Cheese's Pizza Time Theatre.
- Hippo, a peach-colored hippo cartoon character who wears blue-and-white-striped pyjamas, and mascot for Silentnight.
- Patches, a giraffe stuffed toy in Suzy's Zoo
