= List of fictional wolves =

This is a list of wolves in fiction, including normal wolves and anthropomorphic wolf characters. For werewolf characters. see List of werewolves.

== Literature ==
| Character | Source | Author | Notes |
|---|---|---|---|
| Aragh / Aargh | The Dragon and the George | Gordon R. Dickson | A medieval English wolf. |
| Akela | The Jungle Book | Rudyard Kipling | Wise leader of the wolf pack. |
| Baree | Baree, Son of Kazan | James Oliver Curwood | |
| Brokefang and Frostfur | Wolf-Speaker | Tamora Pierce | Leaders of the wolf pack. |
| Brynach and Briavel | The Chronicles of Prydain | Lloyd Alexander | |
| Canim | Codex Alera | Jim Butcher | A race of anthropomorphic wolves. |
| Dog | Mortal Engines | Philip Reeve | Katherine Valentine's pet wolf, who her father, Thaddeus, brought back for her as a present from his expedition to the Ice Wastes. Named Dog due to Katherine's limited capacity for Anglish when she was young and her not knowing what wolves were. |
| Direwolves | A Song of Ice and Fire | George R. R. Martin | The sigil of House Stark, who function as companions and protectors for the Stark children as well as objects of magic. The Direwolves also appear in the series' television adaptation, Game of Thrones. |
| Faolan | Wolves of the Beyond | Kathryn Lasky | A cursed wolf who had been set out to die, but reaches great success with other wolves by his side. |
| Fell | Fell | David Clement-Davies | |
| Greycub | The Cry of the Wolf | Melvin Burgess | The last wolf in England, who is raised by humans and pursued by the Hunter. |
| Gmork | The Neverending Story | Michael Ende | A servant of the power behind The Nothing who is tasked with killing Atreyu before he can save Fantastica. |
| Hopper | The Wheel of Time | Robert Jordan | A friend and teacher of the wolfbrother Perrin Aybara. |
| Huttser and Palla | The Sight | David Clement-Davies | |
| Kazan | Kazan | James Oliver Curwood | |
| Larka | The Sight | David Clement-Davies | |
| Marta | Wolf: The Journey Home | Asta Bowen | The alpha female of the wolf pack. |
| Maugrim | The Lion, the Witch and the Wardrobe | C.S. Lewis | Chief of the White Witch's Secret Police. |
| Nighteyes | The Farseer Trilogy | Robin Hobb | |
| Nitka | Shasta of the Wolves | Olaf Baker | |
| Runt | Runt | Marion Dane Bauer | The runt of King and Silver's litter of four cubs and a black pup with a white star on his chest. Nicknamed Singer due to his howling. |
| White Fang | White Fang | Jack London | Three-quarters wolf and one-quarter dog. He is born wild but raised by Grey Beaver and leads a difficult life until he is adopted and trained to become a fighting dog. |
| (Nameless she-wolf) | The Crossing | Cormac McCarthy | A pregnant wolf who Billy, his father and to a lesser extent, Billy's brother Boyd, attempt to locate and trap after she has been preying on cattle in the area of the family homestead. When Billy finally her, however, instead of killing her, decides to return her to the mountains of Mexico, where he believes her original home is located. He develops a deep affection for and bond with the wolf, risking his life to save her on more than one occasion. |

=== Folk tale ===
- The Boy Who Cried Wolf
- The Goat and Her Three Kids
- Little Red Riding Hood
- The Three Little Pigs
- The Wolf and the Seven Young Kids
- Peter and the Wolf
- The Wolf and the Crane
- The Wolf in Sheep's Clothing
- The Wolf and the Lamb

== Film ==
| Character | Source | Notes |
|---|---|---|
| Alpha wolf | The Grey | |
| Timber wolf | Benji the Hunted | |
| Wolf | The Journey of Natty Gann | |
| George and Angeline | Never Cry Wolf | A biologist studying arctic fauna comes into close contact with a pack of wolves. Based on Farley Mowat's book. |
| Kävik | Kävik the Wolf Dog | |
| Lobo | The Legend of Lobo | |
| Two Socks | Dances with Wolves | Friend of John J. Dunbar. |
| Wolf | 300 | Pitted against the adolescent Leonidas as he traverses the wilderness of the Agoge. |
| Sebastian | Zookeeper | An alpha wolf of Franklin Park Zoo. |
| William Weatherall Wilkins | Mary Poppins Returns | |

== Comics and manga ==
| Character | Source | Notes |
|---|---|---|
| Alberto | Lupo Alberto | A blue wolf who is a resident of the McKenzie farm. He pursues his relationship with Martha, while being antagonized by the sheepdog Moses. |
| Devil | The Phantom | A trained wolf. |
| Legoshi | Beastars | The protagonist, a gray wolf, who falls in love with a dwarf rabbit. |
| Lupo | Fix und Foxi | The major antagonist of the series. |
| Kiba, Tsume, Toboe, Blue, Hige, others | Wolf's Rain | The last wolves to live on the earth after humans have long since rendered earth uninhabitable, who seek to find Paradise. |
| Ranga | That Time I Got Reincarnated as a Slime | The leader of the Tempest Wolf Clan and the loyal subordinate of Rimuru Tempest. |
| Shirou Ogami | BNA: Brand New Animal | |
| Timber Wolf | G.I. Joe | A pet of Joe operative Snake Eyes. |
| Whisper the Wolf | Sonic the Hedgehog (IDW Publishing) | A lone, quiet, traumatized wolf who is a friend of her Wisps, one of Sonic's allies, and former member of the Diamond Cutters. |

== Animation ==
| Character | Source | Notes |
|---|---|---|
| Balto | Balto | A wolf-dog hybrid and the main protagonist of the film. |
| Bergamo | Dragon Ball Super | An anthropomorphic egotistical grey wolf and the eldest member of Trio of Danger. He has a Giant Form, in which he grows bigger and more powerful after each hit he receives, but at the cost of becoming slower as he grows. |
| Captain Dark | Pororo the Little Penguin | |
| Classified | Penguins of Madagascar | The team leader of the North Wind. |
| Ding-a-Ling Wolf | Huckleberry Hound | The younger sidekick to Hokey Wolf, who accompanies him in his misadventures and usually eager to follow in Hokey's ambitious con-artist footsteps. However, he often reconsiders the plans Hokey comes up with in many situations. |
| Gabu | Arashi no Yoru ni | A wolf and one of the main characters of the film. He befriends an unknown animal, named Mei, that he shelters with on a stormy night, only to discover that he is a goat. His friendship causes him to resist pressure from his pack and his own urges to eat Mei. |
| Grey | Sheep and Wolves | The main protagonist of Sheep and Wolves. He is husband of Bianca, the favorite wolf in his pack, and Ragear's arch-nemesis |
| Hokey Wolf | Huckleberry Hound | The smooth-talking titular character of the cartoon. His main hobby is to outsmart and coax the clueless out of free meals or places to stay, which he seemingly does with ease despite potential consequences. |
| Holo | Spice and Wolf | A Wolf Harvest Deity. |
| Humphrey | Alpha and Omega | One of the main protagonists of the series. An omega wolf in Jasper National Park in Alberta, Canada, he falls in love with an Alpha wolf, Kate, in spite of pack laws forbidding it. |
| Jimmy Crystal | Sing 2 | Antagonist of Sing 2, he is a rich media mogul, heading Crystal Entertainment in Redshore City, and father of Porsha Crystal. Arrogant and short-tempered, his funding and allocation of his theater is nonetheless crucial for the musical that the troupe wants to put together. |
| Kate | Alpha and Omega | One of the main protagonists of the series. She is an alpha wolf who falls in love with omega wolf Humphrey despite the rules of their pack preventing their mating. |
| Kiba | Wolf's Rain | An Arctic wolf who is dedicated to finding Paradise and the Lunar Flower, which can open the way to it. |
| Koga | Inuyasha | The fifteen-year-old leader of the eastern yōkai-wolf tribe, which was nearly wiped out by Kagura and Naraku. |
| Linnux | Rock Dog | The alpha leader of sinister wolf gang, the CEO of Linnux industries, and club owner of the Fight Palace. |
| Loopy De Loop | Loopy De Loop | A gentleman wolf who mangled the English language in his bid to converse in a bad French-Canadian accent. Though kind and helpful, his exploits usually got him arrested, beaten up, or chased out of town by those he helped due to prejudice of him being a wolf. The series, distributed to theatres by Columbia Pictures, ran in theaters from November 5, 1959 to June 17, 1965. |
| Luka | Kingdom Force | An anthropomorphic male wolf and one of six leading main characters of the Kingdom Force team. He pilots a red aerial gyro. |
| Pike | Rimba Racer | |
| Porsha Crystal | Sing 2 | Spoiled daughter of media mogul, Jimmy Crystal. Talented in singing but not acting, she is accommodated into the musical to please Jimmy, creating headaches. |
| McWolf/(Name Varied) | Droopy | An wolf who appears in MGM cartoons as a foe of Droopy. |
| Moro | Princess Mononoke | The Goddess of Wolves. |
| Mr. Bumble | Saban's Adventures of Oliver Twist | An old, brown wolf who is the master of the workhouse. |
| Mr. Wolf | The Bad Guys | A pickpocket gray wolf and the leader of the "Bad Guys" gang. |
| Ralph Wolf | Looney Tunes | Co-stars with Sam Sheepdog. Almost identical in appearance to Wile E. Coyote. |
| Riff Raff | Underdog | Gangster and one of Underdog's nemeses. Portrayed as a Rottweiler in the 2007 film. |
| Scar Snout | The Rugrats Movie | |
| Sajin Komamura | Bleach | An anthropomorphic wolf and the captain of the 7th Division. |
| Stinky, Claudette & Runt | Alpha and Omega 2: A Howl-iday Adventure | Kate and Humphrey's puppies. |
| Uruno | Damekko Dōbutsu | A wolf who has the personality of a shy rabbit. |
| Various wolves | Adventure Time | |
| Walter Wolf | Animaniacs | Slappy Squirrel's enemy. |
| Wendy Wolf | Peppa Pig | One of Peppa's friends. Debuted in the episode "The New House". |
| Wilford Wolf | Animaniacs | A nerdy wolf who turns into a hunk on a full moon night. He has a crush on Minerva Mink. |
| The Wolf/Death | Puss In Boots: The Last Wish | An anthropomorphic wolf depicted as a bounty hunter intent on tracking down Puss in Boots and killing him. |
| The Wolf | Well, Just You Wait! | Comedic antagonist of the series. Attempts to capture the Hare in each episode, but always fails. |
| Wolf | Young Justice | An Indian wolf who Superboy adopts after freeing him from the control of the Brain and Monsieur Mallah. |
| Wolf Boss | Kung Fu Panda 2 | Shen's most loyal and trusted servant and the leader of the wolf pack. |
| Wor | Ringing Bell | Called the "Wolf King" in the English dub. |
| Worriz | Legends of Chima | The Alpha male of the Wolf tribe. |
| Yatsufusa | Hakkenden: Eight Dogs of the East | |

== Video games ==
| Canine | Origin | System(s) | Notes |
|---|---|---|---|
| Amaterasu | Ōkami | PS2 · Wii · PS3 · PSN | Japanese Sun-goddess in the form of a white wolf, not given a specific gender in the North American version of the game. |
| Bill Grey | Star Fox 64 | N64 | Trained at the Cornerian Flight Academy with Fox McCloud, elected commander of the Husky and Bulldog squadrons of Corneria. |
| Blaidd | Elden Ring | PC, PS5, Xbox | A warrior who is half man and half wolf. |
| Blanca | Shadow Hearts 2 | PS2 | A white wolf who is an early party member and has a special Wolf Bout mini-game. |
| Blizzard Wolfang | Mega Man X6 | PlayStation | Robotic wolf and boss character, who is fought in a North Pole area. |
| Boris | Bendy and the Ink Machine | Microsoft Windows, macOS, Linux, PlayStation 4, Xbox One, Nintendo Switch, iOS, Android | A cartoon character created by Joey Drew Studios for the fictional Bendy series. |
| Bruce | Animal Boxing | Nintendo DS | Male blue-furred wolf boxer. |
| Cami | Animal Boxing | Nintendo DS | Female white wolf boxer. |
| Chibiterasu | Ōkamiden | Nintendo DS | A white wolf, son of Amaterasu from Ōkami. |
| Diamond Dog (DD) | Metal Gear Solid V: The Phantom Pain | Xbox 360, PlayStation 3, Xbox One, PlayStation 4 | Adopted wolf companion of Big Boss (Venom Snake). Has differing abilities dependent on the gear worn. Stealthy and deadly. |
| Duga | Shining Force EXA | PlayStation 2 | Blue-furred warrior of the Wolfling race who joins the player's party and fights with close combat weapons. |
| Fenri Lunaedge | Mega Man Zero 4 | Game Boy Advance | Robotic wolf antagonist and member of the Einherjar Eight Warriors. |
| Fletcher Kane | Fortnite | Multiple | An anthropomorphic male wolf skin. |
| Grey | Animal Boxing | Nintendo DS | Male grey wolf boxer. |
| Hutch | Animal Boxing | NDS · DSiWare | Male white wolf boxer. |
| Jon Talbain | Darkstalkers | | |
| Larc | Legend of Mana | PlayStation · PSN | A dead wolf warrior resurrected to serve the underworld king. |
| Lappland Saluzzo | Arknights | IOS, Android | A deranged and cunning Lupo guard who was formerly a part of the Siracusan Mafia. |
| Luceid | Wild Arms | PlayStation | The Guardian of Desire; member of a group of spirit beings that embody a particular aspect of the world. |
| Roxanne Wolf | Five Nights at Freddy's: Security Breach | Windows, Nintendo Switch, PlayStation 4, PlayStation 5, Xbox One, Xbox Series X/S, Stadia | One of four animatronics who chase the player character, Gregory. |
| Sabre Wulf | Sabre Wulf | GBA | An evil wolf with a penchant for kleptomania, who steals everything and anything in sight to add it to his hoard. He previously appeared in the ZX Spectrum 1984 video game. |
| Shikuru | Samurai Shodown III | Arcade, PlayStation, Saturn | Companion of Nakoruru while in her "Bust" fighting style. Becomes the partner of Rera in Samurai Shodown V. |
| Shiro | Suikoden 2 | PlayStation | Kinnison's pet wolf who joins at the same time as him. |
| Sierra | Legend of Mana | PlayStation · PSN | Larc's sister, a wolf guardian serving one of the Dragons. |
| Sif, the Great Grey Wolf | Dark Souls | Nintendo Switch · PlayStation 3 · PlayStation 4 · Xbox 360 · Xbox One · Windows | The former hunting companion of the legendary knight Artorias, who grew to a tremendous size and remained to guard Artorias' grave. |
| Terra | Legend of Legaia | PlayStation | Noa hers wolves think friends trouble. |
| Thane | Armello | Windows · Mac · Linux · iOS | Warrior and chosen hero of the Wolf Clan. |
| Triratna | Threefold Recital | Windows | An anthropomorphic Beastling wolf monk and the first of three playable protagonists. |
| Wendell | Fortnite | Multiple | An anthropomorphic male wolf skin. |
| Von Lycaon | Zenless Zone Zero | Windows, iOS, Android, PlayStation 5 | A playable anthropomorphic male wolf butler agent and member of the Victoria Housekeeping faction. |
| Wolf | Mega Man Star Force | Nintendo DS | An alien wolf made of electromagnetic particles. Can fuse with his master, a human named Damian Wolfe, to become "Wolf Woods". (Note: "Wolf Forest" (ウルフ・フォレスト) in the original Japanese version.) |
| Wolfen | Kya: Dark Lineage | PlayStation 2 | Anthropomorphic wolf creatures with various forms, who appear as the main enemy to the heroine Kya. They are the henchmen of the main villain Brazul, having been transformed from another race by one of his machines. If Kya defeats a Wolfen, she can use special magic to return them to their original form. |
| Wolf Link | The Legend of Zelda: Twilight Princess | GameCube, Wii | The cursed transformation of Link in the Twilight Realm, who later gains the ability to switch between human and wolf form. |
| Wolf O'Donnell | Star Fox 64 | N64 | Leader of the Star Wolf team and rival to Fox McCloud. |
| Wolf villagers | Animal Crossing | GameCube | Species type that includes several characters who may inhabit the player's town. |
| Yugo | Bloody Roar | PlayStation, PlayStation 2 | |
| Zylo (Note: "Zappa" (ザッパ) in the original Japanese version.) | Shining Force | Sega Genesis | White-furred member of the Wolfling race who joins the player's party. |

== Music ==
- The music video for Ukrainian singer Ruslana's single Dance with the Wolves included a real wolf and an animated wolf and her puppies.

== Animatronics ==
- Rolfe DeWolfe, a comedic wolf from The Rock-afire Explosion at Showbiz Pizza Place. He has a ventriloquist dummy named Earl Schmerle.

== See also ==
- Werewolf fiction
- Wolfdog
- List of wolves
