= Transylvania in popular culture =

Largely as a result of the success of Bram Stoker's Dracula, Transylvania has become a popular setting for gothic horror fiction, and most particularly vampire fiction. In some later books and movies Stoker's Count Dracula was conflated with the historical Vlad III Dracula, known as Vlad the Impaler (1431–1476), who though most likely born in the Transylvanian city of Sighișoara, ruled over neighboring Wallachia.

== Books ==
- According to some versions of the story, the Pied Piper of Hamelin took the children of Hamelin to Transylvania. The story may be an attempt to explain the Ostsiedlung of the Transylvanian Saxons in the twelfth and thirteenth centuries.
- Dracula, a novel by Bram Stoker. Much of the early action is set in Transylvania, the homeland of the title character.
- Many important figures in Hungarian and Romanian literature came from Transylvania and treated the region extensively in their works. These writers include the Hungarians Áron Tamási, Albert Wass, and Károly Kós and the Romanians Liviu Rebreanu and Ioan Slavici. The Transylvanian Trilogy of historical novels by the Hungarian Miklós Bánffy is an extended treatment of the region's social and political history during the 19th and early 20th century.
- Carpathian Castle, a book by Jules Verne. The action is set in a small village of Transylvania.
- Überwald, a fictional region in Terry Pratchett's Discworld series, is partly based on Transylvania, its populace including vampires, werewolves, dwarves, trolls, orcs, mad scientists and Igors. The name, meaning "across the forest," is a literal translation of "Transylvania" from Latin into German.
- The Historian, a novel by Elizabeth Kostova. Part of the book is set in Transylvania, where the main characters search for clues about Dracula.
- The Sight by David Clement-Davies is set in Transylvania, the book involving a wolf pack and their quest to stop a lone wolf.
- The 25th Hour by Constantin Virgil Gheorghiu depicts a simple Transylvanian peasant caught in the turmoil of ethnic hate leading into the Second World war.
- The Keep, a 1981 novel by F. Paul Wilson.
- In the Harry Potter series Transylvania has a Quidditch team.
- In the Left Behind series, the head of the global government, the Global Community, is a man named Nicolae Carpathia, who reigns from the Transylvania region of Romania.

== Films ==
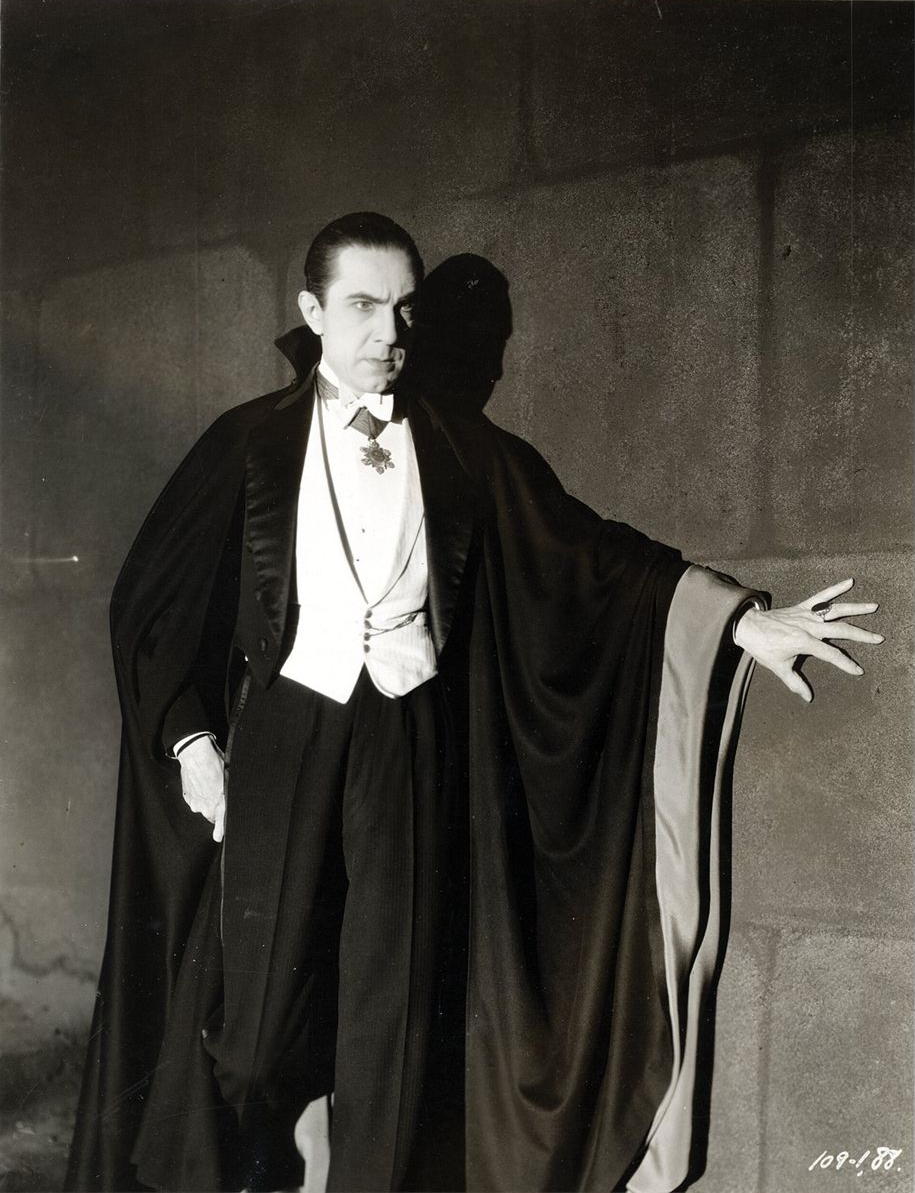
Bela Lugosi as Dracula

- Nosferatu (1922)
- Dracula (1931) starring Bela Lugosi
- Drácula (1931)
- Dracula's Daughter (1936, partially)
- Pygmalion (1938) - although not shown in a horrific way, during the embassy ball the "Royal Family of Transylvania" makes an appearance
- Assorted Hammer Horrors (c. 1958)
- Blood of the Vampire (1958)
- Transylvania 6-5000, a 1963 Bugs Bunny cartoon and a 1985 horror movie parody.
- My Fair Lady (1964)
- The Fearless Vampire Killers (1967)
- The 25th Hour (1967), based on Gheorghiu's book, depicts a simple Transylvanian peasant (played by Anthony Quinn) caught in the turmoil of ethnic hate leading into the Second World War.
- Count Dracula (1970)
- Blacula (1972)
- Son of Dracula (1974)
- Young Frankenstein (1974)
- The Rocky Horror Picture Show (1975) - a parody of horror and sci-fi movies, featuring characters from a distant galaxy called Transylvania
- Dracula and Son (1976)
- Count Dracula (1977)
- Lupin the 3rd: The Mystery of Mamo (1978); The Lupin clone is executed in Transylvania. His body is interred in Bran Castle, dressed up as Dracula by his original self and rigged with explosives.
- Nosferatu the Vampyre (1979)
- Nocturna: Granddaughter of Dracula (1979)
- The Flintstones Meet Rockula and Frankenstone (1979) - called Rocksylvania.
- The Transylvanians series is a trilogy of Romanian Red Western films featuring Transylvanians in the Wild West
  - The Prophet, the Gold and the Transylvanians (1978)
  - The Actress, the Dollars and the Transylvanians (1979)
  - The Oil, the Baby and the Transylvanians (1981)
- The Keep (1983)
- The Howling 2: Your sister is a Werewolf (1983)
- Transylvania 6-5000 (1985)
- Fracchia contro Dracula (1985)
- The Monster Squad (1987)
- Scooby-Doo! and the Reluctant Werewolf (1988)
- Transylvania Twist (1989)
- Bram Stoker's Dracula (1992)
- Dracula: Dead and Loving It (1995)
- Van Helsing (2004)
- Transylvania, a 2006 French film about a young woman who travels to Transylvania looking for a lost love
- Dracula (2006)
- Dracula 3D (2012)
- Dracula Untold (2014)
- Castlevania (TBA)
- The Hotel Transylvania franchise currently consisting of four released films and several computer games. A television series aired on Disney Channel.
  - Hotel Transylvania (2012)
  - Hotel Transylvania 2 (2015)
  - Hotel Transylvania 3: Summer Vacation (2018)
  - Hotel Transylvania: Transformania (2022)
  - Hotel Transylvania: The Television Series (2017–20)
- Monster Family (2017)
- Nosferatu (2024)

== Television programmes ==
- Transylvania is Count von Count's birthplace.
- Transylvania is the Munsters' birthplace.
- Transylvania is one of the places mentioned in various episodes of the animated series The Addams Family, where the Addamses used to have fun in.
- Transylvania is the main setting for the animated series Count Duckula.
- Transylvania is one of the main settings for "Wizards vs. Werewolves", a Wizards of Waverly Place episode.
- Transylvania is the setting for The Young Indiana Jones Chronicles episode "Transylvania: January 1918'" in which Indiana Jones meets Mattais Targo who may be the reincarnation of Vlad the Impaler.
- Transylvania is where Yakko, Wakko, and Dot stayed at Dracula's castle since they made a wrong turn in Animaniacs.
- Transylvania is referenced in the classic Doctor Who episode "The Curse of Fenric".
- Transylvania is the main setting of an episode of The Smurfs called "Scary Smurfs", in which the Smurfs get turned into monsters after eating a gingerbread house. The only ones who were not turned into monsters are Greedy, Papa Smurf, and Painter. However, in this episode, Transylvania is part of Germany, not Romania, because of the Smurfs wearing lederhosen (while Sassette wears lederhosen like the male Smurfs, Smurfette wears a dirndl).
- Transylvania is the main setting for a two part episode of The Hardy Boys/Nancy Drew Mysteries, "Meet Dracula". The characters, posing as a rock group, go to Transylvania to attend a Rock Festival at the Counts Castle.
- Transylvania is one of the main settings for the Disney Junior series Vampirina, the Hauntleys' birthplace.
- In an episode of Chris Tarrant: Extreme Railways, Chris Tarrant visits Transylvania.

== Video games ==
- Most Castlevania games revolve around the epic struggle between the Belmont lineage and Count Dracula who resides in Transylvania.
- In Red Alert 2: Yuri's Revenge, Transylvania is said to be the ancestral home of Yuri. It is also featured as the map in the final mission of the Soviet Campaign.
- In Bugs Bunny and Taz Time Busters, there is a Transylvanian era where the main boss is a vampire.
- In Transylvania (computer game), the nation is the setting of the trilogy of graphic adventure games.
- It is a location in Spider-Man: Friend or Foe, where Blade the Vampire Hunter can be found and be playable, and where Venom is fought as a boss.
- A level in Twisted Metal: Head On centered on a fictional castle in Transylvania.
- The DuckTales video game has a level set in Transyvania, with ghosts and skeletons as enemies and Magica De Spell as the level boss and a vampire named Count Dracula Duck as the final boss (excluding Flintheart Glomgold).
- Soviet Strike has a level set in an irradiated area of Transylvania, containing small "rivers" of radioactive material scattered around the terrain.
- In Funcom's Conspiracy/Horror MMORPG The Secret World, Translyvania is included as an explorable region.
- In War Thunder, one of the aircraft available for use by the player is IAR-81C, part of the IAR 80 series. All of the 448 World War II-era aircraft of this series were produced in Transylvania, at the IAR factory in Brașov.
- The 2021 survival horror game Resident Evil Village is set in the Transylvania region of Romania.
- The Principality of Transylvania is a playable nation in Europa Universalis IV.

== Music ==
=== Songs and albums ===
- Enchanting Transylvania, from comedian Lenny Bruce's album Interviews Of Our Times
- "Transilvania" by Czech hard rock/gothic rock group XIII. Století.
- "Transylvania" an instrumental song by Iron Maiden, that was also covered by Iced Earth on the concept album Horror Show
- "Transylvania 90210" is an album and song by Wednesday 13.
- "Transylvanian Concubine" by Rasputina, remixed by Marilyn Manson, can be found on the soundtrack from Buffy: The Vampire Slayer
- "Transylvanian Forest" by the Polish blackened death metal band Behemoth
- "Transylvania" by American rapper Tyler, the Creator
- Transilvanian Hunger by the Norwegian black metal band Darkthrone
- "Shadows over Transylvania" by Swedish black metal band Dark Funeral
- "Transylvania Transmission Pt1" by Rob Zombie
- "Transylvania" by McFly on their third album Motion in the Ocean
- "Welcome to Transylvania" and "Transylvania Mania" are songs in the Mel Brooks musical Young Frankenstein.
- Many of Cradle of Filth's songs reference Transylvania in relation to Bram Stoker's Dracula
- "TRANSylvania" by Kim Petras featured on her EP, Turn Off the Light, Vol. 1.

== Webcomics ==
- The webcomic Girl Genius takes place in a fictional version of Europe named Europa, one region of which seems to be named Transylvania as evidenced by the existence of a "Transylvania Polygnostic University" and also a "Pax Transylvania" across Europa maintained by an empire based out of the region, much like the Pax Romana.

== See also ==
- Dracula in popular culture
