= Fell (novel) =

2007 novel by David Clement-Davies

- First edition
- Author: David Clement-Davies
- Cover artist: Chad W. Beckerman
- Language: English
- Series: Legend of the Sight
- Genre: Fantasy, young adult fiction
- Publisher: Amulet Books
- Publication date: January 9, 2007
- Publication place: United States
- Media type: Print (hardcover)
- Pages: 544 pp
- ISBN: 0-8109-7266-2
- OCLC: 317927253
- Preceded by: The Sight

Fell is a novel, written by David Clement-Davies as a follow-up to The Sight. The book was published in 2007 by Amulet Books. It follows the story of Fell, a wolf who left his pack after the events of The Sight.

== Plot summary ==
The book starts with a pack of grey wolves walking through the snowy regions of Transylvania. One of the pups looks up at a hill and can see an outline of a black wolf. She tells her father, the Dragga, that it might be Fell, the ghost wolf that humans and Varg fear. Because, while Larka has become respected and loved among the Varg for the part she played in the death of Morgra, Fell became feared among them, and that he is a loner, which is unnatural to other Varg.

Lost in his grief and guilt over the death of his sister, Larka, Fell rejects the gift of the Sight, and becomes a Kerl, which is the wolf name for a loner. The pack keeps the thoughts of curses out of their heads, and Fell watches them leave. He then goes to a pool and looks into it. His dead sister, Larka, appears to him, and she shows him a picture of a girl with a tattoo in the shape of an eagle on her arm. Larka then tells Fell to find and protect the girl.

The girl who Fell saw is Alina Sculcavant, who is growing up in the care of Malduk, a shepherd who rescued her from the snows. He forces her to dress as a boy and work hard for him. The other villagers believe Alina to be a changeling, and fear her for it. One day Alina finds a parchment that holds the true secret of her past, but Malduk and his wife, Ranna, who have tried to hide it from her for years, find out. They murder a villager and frame Alina, so that she is forced to flee into the mountains to discover who she truly is.

Later Alina and Fell get trapped inside an ice cavern. While they are there, they discover that they can mentally communicate using the Sight, and Fell eventually decides to accompany Alina on her journey due to his vision of Larka.

On their journey, Alina goes to find a man mentioned to her by Ivan, who was one of her few friends in Moldov. She eventually finds the man, a blacksmith named Lescu. Alina stays with Lescu and his son, Catalin, for a time, during which Lescu teaches Alina to use a sword and Fell spends some time out in the forest, where he meets his adopted brother, Kar, and a she-wolf named Tarlar. Later soldiers attack the house, killing Lescu. Catalin is forced to travel with Alina and Fell.

Alina finds out that she has a real family and that the Lady Romana is her real mother and the supposedly dead Lord Dragomir is her real father. However, Alina doesn't know that her father was murdered secretly by his best friend, Vladeran. Vladeran then had Alina taken away to be killed because she was the true heir to the throne, but Alina and her soldier escort befell an accident. The soldier was killed but Alina survived, and that was when Malduk found her. Meanwhile, Vladeran took over as Lord of Castelu and married Dragomir's wife, the Lady Romana. Vladeran and Romana now have a seven-year-old son, Elu.

== Characters ==
This is a list of characters in the novel.

=== Humans ===
Alina, or "Alin"—her male alias—was found by Malduk in the snow when she was around eight years old with a dead soldier and his horse, also dead. At the beginning of Fell, Alina is fifteen, hiding the fact that she is female by keeping her red hair short and by binding her chest. Alina is an avid storyteller, and her stories usually consist of tales about goblins, Baba Yaga, and fairies—anything to take her mind from what Malduk and Ranna put her through. Over the years, though, Alina had gotten quite good at storytelling and likes telling stories for their own sake, and enjoys telling stories to others such as Mia. She lives with Malduk, Ranna, and their niece Mia. Because of a "magic potion" given to Alina by Malduk, she has developed amnesia and only in dreams can remember pieces of what happened to her before she was lost in the snow. Alina flees her home when Ranna frames her for murder.

Malduk - old shepherd who, because of his injured back, makes his wife and Alina do a lot of the work around his home. Malduk took Alina in after finding her in the snow, and constantly hangs the idea that Alina owes him for it over her head. He is a superstitious, often cruel man who hardly gives Alina anything to eat aside from bread and a "potion" that he claims will keep the goblins away from Alina, who is said to be a Changeling. A tsinga, or witch/gypsy, gave Malduk the mixture that in reality gave Alina amnesia. This was to ensure that the topic of where Alina came from would not come up, since the girl was already under suspicion because of her strange origins and red hair. Alina's red hair is mentioned in the book, and the villagers of Moldov seem to think that she's a Saxon. Malduk makes Alina do more work than even a boy is expected to do, and both he and his wife Ranna treat her cruelly. Malduk, while pursuing Alina with a band of villagers, is killed by Fell when the wolf moves to protect Alina.

Ranna - Malduk's wife, and a person who is even more cruel than her husband, who actually is somewhat afraid of his wife because of her temperament. Unlike Malduk, Ranna has no reservations about things such as killing—apparently Malduk would have killed Alina had he not been so superstitious, and had he not felt some affection very deep down for the girl. When Alina is accused of murdering Bogdan, who was another shepherd of Moldov, Ranna (who really murdered Bogdan using Alina's knife) pretends to be hurt by Alina's supposed act, saying she "loved him [her] so."

Mia - The niece of Malduk and Ranna. Mia was taken in by her aunt and uncle after her parents died of a sickness. Mia hates the way that her uncle and aunt treat Alina, and her, but does not speak out about it. She does however do secret things for Alina, like bring her food, and find a key to Malduk's locked chest—a chest that had something important to revealing Alina's past inside it. Mia takes risks to do anything she can for Alina, who she admires, and the girl makes up for the ill treatment her aunt and uncle give. Mia loves hearing stories about goblins and fairies from Alina. She playfully believes that since Alina is a goblin child she can use magic to put a spell on her aunt and uncle to make them nicer. After Malduk is killed by Fell, it is discovered that Ranna has fled Moldov with Mia.

Ivan - A kind old man of Moldov who is also a close friend of Alina's. He suspected a long time ago that 'Alin' was really a young woman when she did not go through the same changes as the other boys in the village. He did not tell this to Alina until after she had fled Moldov to avoid being accused of a murder she didn't commit. Ivan is one of the few who believes in Alina's innocence, and he assists Alina in her escape by giving her his walking stick and a bag with provisions. He dies after being tortured by Malduk. Although Malduk states that Ivan had a heart attack when he "questioned" him, Alina sees through this.

Lescu - A swordsmith who lives in Baba Yaga's valley with his son, Catalin. Lescu's wife died previous to the events of Fell, and he has raised Catalin alone, and knows that his son is a little lonely from growing up without a mother. When Alina reaches the valley of Baba Yaga, Lescu lets her stay in a spare room in his home. Lescu was friends with Ivan, and lets Alina live in his house when she mentions that Ivan told her to find him. Some time after Alina has been living in his house, she requests that Lescu teach her to be a warrior, because she wants to be able to face anyone that comes after her. At first Lescu refuses, which creates a rift between him and Alina, but he realizes that Alina does need to be able to defend herself so he teaches her. He forges a sword for her, and on the day he finishes it, he is killed by Vladeran's soldiers when they discover Alina is living with him.

Catalin - Lescu's son, a young man around Alina's age. His mother died when he was young, so he has grown up without a mother and according to Lescu is lonely because of it. Catalin is interested in Alina when he first meets her, and he begins to feel attracted to her, and Alina does as well. He distances himself from her a few times in the book because he learns that she has been travelling with Fell, who he thinks is the devil in wolf form. Catalin also feels distanced from Alina because she is learning arts that he believes only men should learn. He makes up with her later, however, after she and Fell are caught in an ambush by the remaining soldiers of Vladeran that escaped from his house after killing Lescu. He travels with her to the village of the Helgra to find out more about them and to help Alina learn more about Vladeran and Castelu.

Lord Vladeran - The ruler of Castelu, cousin and ally of Draculea. It's said that he's allied with Draculea to bring down King Stefan Cel Mare. Vladeran is Alina's step-father, who married Alina's mother Lady Romana after her father supposedly died. He cast out Alina after his baby son was taken by wolves (this event happened in The Sight). In addition to calling Alina a traitor and throwing her out, at one point Vladeran contemplates murdering his seven-year-old son, Elu. Vladeran learned dark magic and gained the ability to talk to the dead—namely, Morgra, Fell's deceased aunt who had the Sight and put a 'curse' on him and his family when they refused to let her travel with them. Vladeran and Morgra torment Fell using the Sight and the dark arts Vladeran learned.

Lady Romana - Alina and Elu's mother. At one point, Romana hated Alina because she lost Elu. Later, however, it is revealed that Romana has realized her mistake of blaming Alina. She was the one who helped Alina escape from Castelu prison after Vladeran had captured the fifteen-year-old girl, and asked for her daughter's forgiveness for not seeing the truth of what Vladeran was doing.

Elu - Alina's baby brother, and Lord Vladeran and Lady Romana's seven-year-old son. He was taken from his bed by wolves in The Sight when Alina was just eight years old. Alina had been instructed to watch her brother overnight, but got hungry and went to the kitchen for food, only to come back into and discover that her brother was gone. Elu, named Bran by the wolves, possessed The Sight and had a little strip of 'fur' on his stomach that made the wolves view him as a marked one. The wolves kept Elu/Bran for a while, and a short time after Larka gave the Vision to her brother, Fell took the infant human back to his home. Elu, having been so young, naturally does not remember any of what happened, and likely no one told him that he was taken away by wolves.

Lord Dragomir - Lady Romana's previous husband, Alina's father, and Elu's step-father, or so it could be assumed since Elu's birth father Vladeran was killed by Fell. Vladeran and Dragomir were close friends, but Vladeran betrayed him. Before a battle, Vladeran deliberately damaged Lord Dragomir's saddle so that he fell off his horse and was supposedly killed. Vladeran received a prophecy from Morgra that he "could only be killed if her [Alina's] father is in sight of these very halls", but thought that he never could be since he'd seen Lord Dragomir die.

Bogdan - A villager of Moldov that Ranna murdered with Alina's knife. Ranna and Malduk dislike him, believing that he has eyes on their land, Alina (who he calls a warlock), and Ranna herself for a wife. Ranna framed Alina for murdering Bogdan so the villagers would turn against and kill the young girl in retribution. It seems Ranna did this so she and Malduk could be rid of Bogdan, and Alina in one go without actually killing the girl themselves—if they did, they believed Mia would figure it out, since she was close to Alina.

Barbat - A villager of Moldov who was one of the men who found Bogdan's body with Alina's knife in his back.

=== The Wolves ===
Fell - The black-furred wolf once was tricked by Morgra, his aunt, into believing that he was the evil wolf, Wolfbane. Thanks to his sister Larka, though, he was snapped out of this. Fell still goes against Morgra even though she died several years ago. Fell feels guilt for his sister's death and became a Kerl (a wolf with no pack) because of the guilt. He also feels that since he was once Wolfbane, he is afraid of harming his family, and so stays away from them. He wonders about the Sight, and wonders what he should do. Several times he asks himself if he is in the light, or the dark. Ottol, a beaver, puts the same question past him, but tells Fell that he enjoys the sunlight like most creatures even if he chooses the darkness. By the end of the book Fell knows that he had finally left the darkness and can escape the shadows of the past to become a true wild wolf, and start a new life with Tarlar.

Kar - Fell's adopted brother, a gray wolf. His parents were killed in The Sight, but Skop saved him and took him to join Huttser's pack. Kar always acted a little more like a Sikla (Omega) wolf than he should, but still has moments of bravery. He finds Fell later when he was travelling with Tarlar as they tried to keep away from Jalgan. Kar asked Fell to join up with them and fight Jalgan, but Fell still has reservations about re-joining his pack.

Tarlar - A female gray wolf who Fell first met while she was travelling with Kar. She and her younger brother, Kenkur, were once part of Jalgan's pack, and Jalgan saw Tarlar as his mate. Tarlar didn't see fault with Jalgan and ignored her younger brother when he tried to warn her that Jalgan was no good. Kenkur was challenged by Jalgan, who called him "a Sikla and a traitor", before killing him. Then Tarlar left, but Jalgan still saw her as his mate. Tarlar, however, does not want him and begins to fall in love with Fell, who also begins to love her in return.

Jalgan - Leader of the Vengerid, a pack of Draggas and Drappas who fight just for the purpose of fighting. Jalgan is a huge, strong grey wolf, with a stripe of silver down his back. Jalgan challenges Fell's parents, and eventually kills Fell's father, Huttser. Fell takes his revenge and kills Jalgan.

Larka - Fell's sister who sadly met a tragic end in first book re-appears as a spirit to warn Fell that he must help a human girl to save the certainty of life and balance of the wild.

== See also ==
- The Sight, Fell's prequel
- Fire Bringer, The Sight's prequel
