= The Waiting Dog =

Children's book

The Waiting Dog is an illustrated book written and illustrated by sisters Carolyn and Andrea Beck. It was published in 2003 by Kids Can Press of Toronto, although it is not currently listed on their website. It is classified as for ages 8 and up. Andreabeck.com describes the book as “for older readers” and notes that it is “not currently available.” Amazon.ca has limited “new” copies of the book available from the seller “Carolyn Beck.”

== Plot ==
The book opens with a sticker on the cover with a warning saying: “Warning! Do you have the guts to read this book?” then continues on to describe a dogs desire to eat the mailman. The prose uses rhyming verse to describe in detail the dog’s fantasies, and the gory illustrations graphically depict everything from the mailman’s disembowelment to the dog eating his brain.

=== Reviews ===
The book currently holds a 4.5 star rating on Amazon.ca based on 14 reviews. Goodreads has it rated at 3.25 stars out of 5 after 20 ratings. Notable reviews include one by literary journal Quill and Quire which gives nods to the “expansive vocabulary” and “humorous touches.” The review concludes with: “Overall, this is a nicely produced book, and whether it elicits belly laughs or turns stomachs is, as I’m sure the rhyming dog would agree, largely a matter of taste.”

==== Challenge ====
Freedomtoread.ca lists a 2006 challenge to the book from a parent complaining to the Burlington Public Library about them stocking it. According to the site “the parent described the book as “revolting” and “vile.” The parent objected to depictions of violence and said that the work was "age inappropriate".

The library responded via letter to the parent that “the “offbeat humour” in the book might not be to everyone’s taste. The letter added that the book met the selection standards of the library and that not every book will be appropriate for every child or family. The library’s picture book collection contained titles for a wide variety of ages and tastes. The library relied on parents, the letter said, to screen library materials for their children. The library also retained The Waiting Dog in its collection with no change to its classification or department."
