= Polka Dot Shorts =

Canadian children's television series

Polka Dot Shorts is a Canadian children's television series produced and broadcast by TVOntario from 1994 to 1997. It was created, produced, and edited by Jed MacKay.

Approximately 180 episodes were produced, all directed by Michael McNamara.

== About ==
The series is based on Polka Dot Door, and stars the characters Polkaroo, Humpty, Dumpty, Bear and Marigold. The characters are portrayed by "physical theatre" actors in large costumes; Marigold's performer, for example, had a ballet and circus background. Unlike in Polka Dot Door, in which Polkaroo only ever vocalized his own name, in Polka Dot Shorts he spoke full dialogue in English.

The show's original concept had been to retain the characters while Polka Dot Door underwent a temporary production hiatus, although ultimately Polka Dot Shorts continued and the original Polka Dot Door did not resume production.

Originally, each episode started with a human host (Deborah Drakeford) introducing the episode to a gathering of children as she was about to read the story from a book. The stories themselves were dramatized by actors in large suits, playing the puppets from Polka Dot Door, while the reader provided the dialogue. A new character was added to the Polka Dot Door family: Polkaroo's pet, Bibble. Although Bibble was only capable of making sounds that loosely resembled "bibblebibblebibble", he did so in various tones which indicated his mood.

At one point in every episode, one or more of the characters would discover a large pair of polka dot shorts, and exclaim, "A great big pair of polka dot shorts! How did they get there?" Polkaroo's response would be, "I haven't the foggiest idea!" Some episodes were done entirely in rhyme, in which case the character who found the polka dot shorts would exclaim, "Polka dot shorts, a great big pair! How on earth did they get there?"

After the first two seasons the episodes were re-edited. The human hostess/storyteller was removed, and the show would begin immediately.

The series won a Gemini Award for Best Pre-School Program or Series at the 15th Gemini Awards in 2000, and Charles P. Schott ("Bear") was a Gemini Award finalist for Best Performer in a Pre-School Series at the 17th Gemini Awards in 2002.

== Characters ==
- Polkaroo (played by Greg Lanthier, voiced by Andrew Sabiston) – A green kangaroo-like animal with yellow hair, a red nose, a long yellow furry tail, a red-and-yellow polka dot on his neck and a gown covered in polka dots. He appears in every episode. He lives in a small house with his pet Bibble. He enjoys having his friends round to play and is mostly the one who finds the polka dot shorts. He sometimes talks in rhyme, and when his friends argue or do something he doesn't like, he often interrupts them with "Excuse me".
- Bibble – Polkaroo's mischievous pet which looks like a multi-coloured mop head covered in pom-poms. Often seen moving about making a "bibbly" sound, hence his name. He likes to pull pranks, and sometimes annoys the others with them.
- Humpty (played by Line Roberge, voiced by Tony Daniels): A big green egg with purplish hair and a white nose. He wears a burgundy coloured suit patterned with pink roses, a tie with a large letter H on it, and green boots. Humpty is playful and sometimes a bit mischievous, but he always goes out of his way to help his friends. When the gang start to feel scared or nervous, he often says "Pull yourself together." He is Dumpty's older brother.
- Dumpty (played by Brunella Battista, voiced by Julie Lemieux) – Humpty's younger brother. He is brown with a blue checked nose, and wears a cream-coloured cap with the letter D on it, a blue bow tie, a blue gingham suit with flowers on it, and brown boots. The youngest of the group, he loves to help and wants to fit in. He sometimes annoys his older brother Humpty, but deeply cares for him.
- Bear (played by Charles P. Schott, voiced by Brian Moffatt) – A brown bear who is Polkaroo's best friend and wears a green bow tie with white polka dots. He has a great fondness for honey, speaks with a posh accent, and can sometimes be a bit of a show-off. He often says "Coincidence, I think not."
- Marigold (played by Alisa Walton, voiced by Deborah Drakeford) – A kind-hearted doll with orange yarn-like hair in pigtails. She wears a green dress with flowers on it, yellow-and-white striped leggings, and black buckle shoes. She loves gardening and grows many different plants. She often says "You know what? I'll tell you what."

== Episodes ==
=== Series 1 (1994) ===
- Shadow Dancer
- The Rookie
- Treasure Map
- Goodnight, Polkaroo
- The Ball That Got Broken
- Just For Two
- Polkaroo The Painter

=== Series 2 (1995) ===
- Small Comfort
- Bibble's Bubble Bath
- Rainbow Bird
- Humpty's Fair Share
- A Star Is Born
- Great White Bibble
- Home Sweet Home
- Cutler in The Cake
- Phantom of The Nursery Rhyme
- Polkaroo of The Jungle
- Aloha
- Unbearable
- The Golden Pear
- Sleeping Beauty
- Show Me The Honey
- Royal Visit
- Humptanic
- King Dumpty
- Kla Two
- Picture Perfect
- Knock Knock
- Jack and The Beanstalk
- Cereal Bowl
- A Windy Day
- Lots of Spots
- The Sandwich
- Seasons Greetings Polkaroo

=== Series 3 (1996) ===
- Sweet and Sour Surprise
- Whip Whop Woes
- Thunder Bear
- Not Enough Helpers
- Badge of Merit
- Hooray for Dumpty
- In The Bag
- Incredible Shrinking Plant
- Big Boot
- Polkarobot
- Vote For Me
- The Bibble Ra
- Bibble Day
- Ode to Bibble
- Polkaroo's Thanksgiving
- The Snowman
- Bibble's Birthday
- Knock on Wood
- Pardon My Garden
- The Great Obstacle Race
- The Wonderfully Marvelous Thingamajig

=== Series 4 (1997) ===
- Magnet Mayhem
- A Champion Chomper

== See also ==
- Gisèle's Big Backyard, a segment on TVO Kids where the characters appeared after this show ended
