= Alisa Walton =

Canadian actress (born 1970)

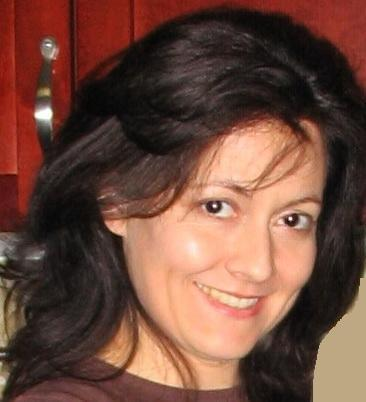
- Actor Alisa Walton in 2007
- Born: Alisa Walton; January 15, 1970 (age 56); Trois-Rivières, Quebec, Canada
- Years active: 1993–present

Alisa Walton (born January 15, 1970) is a Canadian actress best known for her work as Marigold on TVOntario's Polka Dot Shorts from 1993 to 2001, and as Socks the Monkey on the series' Elliot Moose on TVOntario and PBS.

Walton is also an accomplished dancer & mime artist. As a youth she trained with the Royal Winnipeg Ballet School and the Celia Franca School of Dance in Ottawa.

She is a certified Pilates instructor, and a photographer. She is also the artistic director of Crow's Feet Physical Theatre, a Toronto-based company of Dance and Circus Artists over the age of 40.

== Selected credits ==
- Polka Dot Shorts — Marigold
- Elliot Moose — Soxielle "Socks" Monkey
- Cirque Sublime Zero-Gravity Circus — Ringmaster/stilt dancer/clown
