= Elliot Moose (TV series) =

- Title card
- Genre: Preschool
- Based on: Elliot Moose by Andrea Beck
- Developed by: Jed MacKay
- Directed by: Steve Wright; Michael McNamara; Charles E. Bastien
- Starring: Charles P. Schott; Alisa Walton; Heidimarie Guggi; Stephen LaFrenie; Mark Wallace
- Composers: Jed MacKay; Bruce Ley
- Country of origin: Canada
- No. of seasons: 2
- No. of episodes: 26 (104 segments)

Production
- Executive producers: Patrick Loubert; Michael Hirsh; Clive A. Smith
- Producer: Marianne Culbert
- Running time: 22 minutes (4 segments per episode)
- Production company: Nelvana Limited

Original release
- Network: TVOntario (Canada); PBS Kids (United States)
- Release: September 6, 1999 – September 20, 2000

Elliot Moose (French: Elliot Caribou) is a Canadian children's live-action-animated television series produced by Nelvana Limited for TVOntario. The series was developed by Jed MacKay, who had previously worked on other live-action children's series for TVOntario. It aired from September 6, 1999, until September 20, 2000, based on Andrea Beck's children's book series, Elliot Moose. 26 half-hour episodes consisting of 104 segments were produced.

== Premise ==
Elliot Moose features a young moose named Elliot who lives in a place called "the Big House". He goes on adventures with his friends Beaverton, Lionel, Socks, and Paisley.

== Production ==
The series' stories were half animated and half live action, reflecting children's real world of play and their imaginary world. The music was composed by Bruce Ley and Jed MacKay. Both seasons of Elliot Moose were produced in 1998.

== Characters ==
=== Major ===
- Elliot (puppeteered by Charles P. Schott and voiced by Al Mukadam) is the protagonist of the series and the leader of the group. He is a young moose calf who loves going on adventures with his best friend Socks. His catchphrase is "Amazing!"
- Socks (puppeteered by Alisa Walton and voiced by Ruby Smith-Merovitz) is Elliot's best friend. She is a purple monkey who becomes friends with Elliot as his sidekick.
- Paisley (puppeteered by Mark Wallace and voiced by Frannie Diggins) is a red bear who looks up to his researches.
- Lionel (puppeteered by Heidimarie Guggi and voiced by Amos Crawley) is a yellow lion who has orders to show Elliot and his friends as the leader of the group.
- Beaverton (puppetered by Stephen LaFrenie and voiced by Keith Knight) is a dark brown beaver who loves wood and is part of the group.

=== Supporting ===
- Amy (voiced by Julie Lemieux) is an anteater who is also part of the group. She only appears in the animated segments.
- Drusilla (voiced by Lizzy Hanna) is a dragon who, despite her enormous size, means the group no harm and is quite friendly. She also only appears in the animated segments.
- Mong (voiced by Amos Crawley) is the antagonist of the series. He is a greedy little mouse who only appears in the animated segments.

== Cast ==
=== Live-action actors ===
- Charles P. Schott as Elliot Moose
- Alisa Walton as Socks
- Heidimarie Guggi as Lionel
- Stephen LaFrenie as Beaverton
- Mark Wallace as Paisley

=== Voice cast ===
- Amos Crawley as Mong and Lionel
- Al Mukadam as Elliot
- Ruby Smith-Merovitz as Socks
- Lizzy Hanna as Drusilla Dragon
- Julie Lemieux as Amy
- Greg Spottiswood
- Frannie Diggins as Paisley
- Keith Knight as Beaverton
- James Rankin

== Telecast and home media ==
In Canada, the show was first aired on September 6, 1999, with the final episode aired on September 20, 2000.

The show was introduced in the United States through syndication on PBS, as a segment on the PBS Kids Bookworm Bunch block. Reruns aired on Qubo from 2007 to 2010. The series was released by Kids Motion Entertainment on VHS and also by KaBoom! Entertainment on DVD, and as of 2022, the series is now streaming on Tubi.

== Episodes ==
Note: The first and last episode segments are live-action, while the second and third episode segments are animated. PBS airings of season 1 placed the first live-action segment after the first animated segment, and showed an animated segment from season 2 at the end of the episode.

=== Season 1: 1999 ===
No.	Segments	Original release date
1	"The Alien / The Lion Who Lost His Roar / The Marshmallow Express / Help!"	September 6, 1999
The Alien -; The Lion Who Lost His Roar - King Lionel has lost his roar, and gets it back when he rescues Elliot and Socks from a fierce lion.; The Marshmallow Express - Sheriff Elliot and Deputy Socks have to stop the Marshmallow Express from crashing into a rock blocking the railway.; Help! -
2	"A Tail or Two / A Lion In Summer / The Giant Pongolongo / Elliot's Masterpiece"	September 7, 1999
A Tail or Two -; A Lion In Summer -; The Giant Pongolongo -; Elliot's Masterpiece -
3	"Lionel and the Roaring Hiccups / Sockserella / Crazy Mixed-Up Lion / The Cap Club"	September 8, 1999
Lionel and the Roaring Hiccups -; Sockserella - Sockserella, helped by her Fairy Godfather, attends a dance ball and meets Prince Elliot for a dance.; Crazy Mixed-Up Lion - Hoping to take a break from meetings, King Lionel decides to be something other than a meeting.; The Cap Club -
4	"Ride Share / Fistful of Crayons / The Socksness Monster / Another Way To Play"	September 9, 1999
Ride Share -; Fistful of Crayons - Kid Crayon introduces colour to Rainbow Gulch and then Annie Socksley comes to town.; The Socksness Monster - Elliot tries to get a photo of the Loch Ness Monster for Professor McPaisley, with a bit of help from Socks.; Another Way To Play -
5	"Bear Care / Dragon Horse / 201—A Space Oddity / Tuneless"	September 10, 1999
Bear Care -; Dragon Horse -; 201—A Space Oddity -; Tuneless -
6	"Batter Up! / The Case of the Haunted Windmill / The Cape of Courage / Dream Along With Me"	September 13, 1999
Batter Up! -; The Case of the Haunted Windmill - Elliot Moose and Dr. Sockson uncover Mousiarti's plot to scare Amy from her windmill.; The Cape of Courage - King Lionel feels afraid without his cape of courage until he ventures to retrieve it along with his kite.; Dream Along With Me -
7	"The Mountain / Queen of the Waves / Playground Puzzle / Collector Elliot"	September 14, 1999
The Mountain -; Queen of the Waves - Captain Elliot Moosebeard and First Mate Socks rescue Amy Queen of the Waves from an evil sea dragon.; Playground Puzzle - Elliot Moose and Dr. Sockson investigate the disappearance of playground rides.; Collector Elliot -
8	"The Tooter Scooter / Star Trick / The Case of the Invisible Elephant / The Quest Request"	September 15, 1999
The Tooter Scooter -; Star Trick -; The Case of the Invisible Elephant -; The Quest Request -
9	"The Wading Pool / Shabu Gamu / The Lost Treasure / Circus Thrill"	September 16, 1999
The Wading Pool -; Shabu Gamu -; The Lost Treasure -; Circus Thrill -
10	"Beach Toys / Lion Aid / Sir Elliot and the Dragon / Friendship Flowers"	September 17, 1999
Beach Toys -; Lion Aid -; Sir Elliot and the Dragon -; Friendship Flowers -
11	"Wake Up, Elliot! / A Little Magic / Slow and Steady / Spoil Sport"	September 20, 1999
Wake Up, Elliot! -; A Little Magic -; Slow and Steady -; Spoil Sport - Winning isn't everything, especially when it means cheating. Socks must learn fairly with her friends.
12	"The Cat Nap / Elliot Mapleberry / The Magic Pond / Boo!"	September 21, 1999
The Cat Nap -; Elliot Mapleberry -; The Magic Pond -; Boo! -
13	"Happy Homemakers / The Mystery of the Missing Chalk / The Legend of the Purple Knight / The Walnut Conspiracy"	September 22, 1999
Happy Homemakers -; The Mystery of the Missing Chalk -; The Legend of the Purple Knight -; The Walnut Conspiracy -

=== Season 2: 2000 ===
No.	Segments	Original release date
14	"Yes We Have No Bananas / Double Trouble / The Case of the Popcorn Pirate / The Spooky Kooky Creature"	September 4, 2000
Yes We Have No Bananas -; Double Trouble - Mousenificent uses robotic clones of Paisley, Amy, and Beaverton to steal a secret spice, but Commander Elliot and Rocket Socks thwart him.; The Case of the Popcorn Pirate - Detective Elliot and Dr. Sockson investigate Farmer Paisley's disappearing corn crops which are being turned into popcorn by Professor Mouseiarti.; The Spooky Kooky Creature -
15	"The Surprise Party / Hot Ice / The Mapleberry Touch / Underwater Collecting"	September 5, 2000
The Surprise Party -; Hot Ice - During a treasure hunt, Captain Elliot's boat gets stuck in an iceberg, but Drusilla Dragon helps out, telling them how much she enjoys visitors.; The Mapleberry Touch - Sir Lionel gives King Elliot a magic vase with a genie. The genie grants Elliot a wish to turn anything he touches into mapleberries. This turns out to be a big mistake.; Underwater Collecting -
16	"Be Still Life / Picture This / Beaverton Caruso / Hopscotch Fever"	September 6, 2000
Be Still Life -; Picture This - Elliot wants to take a picture of the Mustache Mouse, but is interrupted by the Zigzag Fly.; Beaverton Caruso - Stranded on a desert island, Beaverton is focused on working, while Elliot and Socks neglect their duties to have some fun.; Hopscotch Fever -
17	"Beaverton's Dam / Star Players / Socksel and Grelliot / Mapleberry Hog"	September 7, 2000
Beaverton's Dam -; Star Players - Commander Elliot and Rocket Socks find themselves trapped in Beaverton's space cleaning ship. A wishing star on the ship is the answer to their predicament.; Socksel and Grelliot - Socksel, Grelliot and Paisel get lost in the forest. Paisel guides them back and Meister Mouse gives them back their mapleberries.; Mapleberry Hog -
18	"The Song Contest / New Crew / The Treasure Chest / Comfy As A King"	September 8, 2000
The Song Contest -; New Crew - Sir Mousey McPilfer plots to overthrow Captain Elliot and his crew so he can steal the treasure of the Smiling King, but ends up with no treasure at all.; The Treasure Chest - Captain Elliot and his crew look around an island for treasure. Elliot hurts his foot against an oyster, which holds a pearl.; Comfy As A King -
19	"The Hike / Ascent of Moose Mountain / Dragon's Egg / No Sleep For Elliot"	September 11, 2000
The Hike -; Ascent of Moose Mountain - Elliot and Socks compete against Lionel and Paisley to be the first to climb to the peak of Moose Mountain.; Dragon's Egg - Mousenificent strands Commander Elliot and Rocket Socks on an uncharted planet, but the Space Dragon Tiny decides to rescue them, while they save her egg from Mousenificent.; No Sleep For Elliot -
20	"It's Only Me / Red Riding Socks / Socks And Shoes / The Workout"	September 12, 2000
It's Only Me -; Red Riding Socks - Red Riding Socks takes a basket of goodies to her grandmother, but Wolfgang mouse intends to get the basket for himself.; Socks And Shoes - Sir Elliot Moosealot and Squire Socks perform a special juggling act with tap dancing to make the tyrant Queen of Dragontown happy.; The Workout -
21	"The Broken Robot / Paisley The Great / Scaredy Cat / Ace of Space"	September 13, 2000
The Broken Robot -; Paisley The Great - Paisley has a case of stage fright, but an encounter with a fierce lion helps overcome his fear.; Scaredy Cat - Lionel is appointed a circus star by Amy, but Lionel doesn't want to go to the city, so he acts like a scaredy cat.; Ace of Space -
22	"Mighty Muscle Maker / The Squeakily Ghost / The Flower-Spotted Dragon / Elliot's Hat"	September 14, 2000
Mighty Muscle Maker -; The Squeakily Ghost - Detective Elliot and Dr. Sockson investigate a Squeakily Ghost in Beaverton's farm, which turns out to be Paisley doing his washing.; The Flower-Spotted Dragon - Elliot and Socks try to take a picture of the flower-spotted dragon Dorathea, but her camouflage isn't making it easy.; Elliot's Hat -
23	"Tummy Ache / Mysterious Pieland / Space Monkeys / Mapleberry Pie"	September 15, 2000
Tummy Ache -; Mysterious Pieland - Captain Moosebeard's treasure hunt leads his crew to an island made of candy called Pieland, but this is a trap set by Sir Mousey McPilfer, so he can steal their ship.; Space Monkeys - Commander Elliot and Rocket Socks search for Amy's missing space spinach, which has been stolen by Mousenificent and his space monkey crew.; Mapleberry Pie -
24	"Beaverton's Balloons / Emperor Elliot's New Robe / The Sea Dragon / Nursery Rhyme"	September 18, 2000
Beaverton's Balloons -; Emperor Elliot's New Robe - Emperor Elliot does not have a birthday robe for this year, so his friends make him one.; The Sea Dragon - Captain Elliot and his crew see what they think is a sea dragon until they meet Drusilla the next morning.; Nursery Rhyme -
25	"Glum Chum / The Mystery At Top Cat Manor / Sleeping Socks / Backscratching"	September 19, 2000
Glum Chum -; The Mystery At Top Cat Manor - Detective Elliot and Dr. Sockson visit Sir Lionel Top Cat's Manor where a disguised Professor Mouseiarti is stealing the famous cheese.; Sleeping Socks - Socks and the whole castle is put under a sleeping spell by the wizard Mouseputin until Prince Elliot Moose breaks the spell.; Backscratching -
26	"Smile! / The Case of the Missing Mapleberries / Fly By Knight / The Mousetrap"	September 20, 2000
Smile! -; The Case of the Missing Mapleberries - Detective Elliot and Dr. Sockson investigate Beaverton's missing Mapleberries and uncovers Professor Mouseiarti's juice factory.; Fly By Knight - Sir Elliot Moosealot attempts to fly like a bird. After several attempts, his friends help him build a glider.; The Mousetrap -
