= The Sight (Clement-Davies novel) =

Novel by David Clement-Davies

- First edition
- Author: David Clement-Davies
- Language: English
- Series: The Sight
- Genre: Fantasy
- Publisher: Macmillan Children's Books, London
- Publication date: 7 Jun 2002
- Publication place: United Kingdom
- English publication date: 2002
- Media type: Paperback
- Pages: 554
- Preceded by: Fire Bringer
- Followed by: Fell

The Sight is a young adult fantasy novel written by British author David Clement-Davies. It is the first novel in The Sight series, with its sequel Fell taking place after. It follows a pack of wolves cursed by a lone wolf, Morgra, whose powers foretell the destiny of one of the mother wolf's pups: Larka, a white wolf gifted with a mysterious power known as The Sight. The story follows Larka's life as she is burdened with pain and terror that comes with the prophecy, as well as seeing the viewpoints of Larka's parents, Huttser and Palla, and her adoptive brother Kar.

Written in 2002, Clement-Davies's was inspired to write The Sight after experiencing Romania in winter of 1990, and was inspired by superstition and folklore, such as Dracula.

The Sight is the first within its own series that follows the wolf pack, but is also implied to be set in the same setting as Fire Bringer, Clement-Davies' debut novel.

== Plot Introduction ==
A wolf pack seeks shelter beneath the shadow of an abandoned castle. The she-wolf, Palla, is ready to give birth but fears for their survival against the harsh winter of 15th century Transylvania. However, a more dangerous threat comes from a lone wolf named Morgra, who possesses a mysterious and terrifying power known as the Sight. Accompanying her is a raven named Kraar, who feeds on the dead. Morgra's powers foretells the destiny of one of Palla's pups; to possess a power greater than Morgras and potentially have the ability to control the world and those to come. Despite Morgra's eerie prophecy, the pack remains undaunted and are willing to do whatever it takes to protect each other. Even if it means battling against all of nature, the dead and the one creature wolves fear the most — Man.

== Characters ==
- Larka is the main character and, like Morgra, has the Sight. At first she is terrified, but as the story progresses she learns to control her power. Because of Morgra's "curse" all her packmates dies except her mother, father, her brother (who in the middle of the book fell through the ice on a river and then lost his memory), and her best friend Kar. She has a pure white pelt and gold eyes. Larka dies alongside Morgra after plummeting from a height and into rocks below, a death of which she foresaw, which greatly distresses her family - especially Fell and Kar. Larka and Kar realised they were in love later in the book when Kar brought Larka back from The Searchers. Without Kar, Larka would've died without completing her mission. She longed to have Cubs with him and start a pack of their own, but died before this could happen and appeared in Kar's dream. Her parents, Huttser and Palla, name grey cub from their next litter after Larka.
- Fell is Larka's brother. He has a pure black pelt with yellow eyes with a sliver of green in the right eye. As a pup he pretended he was scared of nothing as a show of courage; he also proved to be a troublemaker and would often tease Kar. He was also jealous of the attention Larka have Kar. After Fell fell through the ice, he was found by Morgra and brainwashed to make him believe he was Wolfbane. Larka brought him back to believe in who he really was and help bring about the Vision. Fell also has the Sight, although this is not clearly stated until Larka confronts him in Harja. After the events of the story, Fell leaves the pack and makes his own journey alone to find his sense of self. His journey is continued in the book Fell.
- Morgra is the main antagonist. She possesses the Sight, and is Palla's half sister. She was believed to be a pup killer, which was an accusation brought about by a tragic misunderstanding revealed to the pack by Brassa. Her Helper, a bird companion that helps any wolf with the Sight learn to see through the eyes of birds, is a raven named Kraar. Morgra desired to fulfill the prophecy and bring about the Vision herself to become the Man-Varg. She died by falling off a cliff with Larka, failing to complete her mission.
- Huttser is Larka and Fell's father and Dragga of the pack. He is described as a large silver wolf with reddish flecks in his tail. His sister is Kipcha. Huttser is a proud and strong wolf who proves to be a capable leader and fighter. He maintains a shaky relationship with Kar, who he adamantly rejects for being weak and not one of his own, but the two eventually are able to make up and recognise each other as father and son. Palla is his mate whom he loves. He often thanked the wolf gods, Tor and Fenris, for the fact Palla chose him to be her mate and said she was the most brave and beautiful she wolf he ever saw.
- Palla is Huttser's mate, and the Drappa of the pack. She is Morgra's half-sister, and has a brother named Skop. Though the books do not mention her main fur color, it is said that she has a long, slim muzzle and bushy silver ears. Palla in herself is a strong fighter but also a loving mother, who is filled with despair when she believes Fell has died and even blamed Huttser for his death. Palla is heartbroken when Larka dies. Palla is also the mother of Khaz II, Skop II, Larka II and Kipcha II, who are named after the deceased members of her pack.
- Kar is an orphan who accompanies Skop to the main pack, and is then left with them when Skop leaves to join the rebel pack. He and Larka are extremely close friends, and intended to also become mates before Larka’s demise. Kar was initially subjected to Fell’s teasing but the two recognised each other as brothers later in life. He is described as looking like a true Dragga, but often is shown to be slightly cowardly and more of a Sikla(omega). He had two brothers who were taken and killed by Morgra. He has a dark grey pelt. At first, Huttser didn't have much patience for Kar but they eventually got closer. Palla was gentle with him, considering him a replacement for her unnamed Cubs, who died when Larka and Fell were born. Once Larka died, Kar was heartbroken and effected the most, alongside Fell.
- Brassa is the pack's oldest member. She was the nurse who raised Palla and Skop as pups. She knew of Morgra's innocence in the pup killing, but said nothing to defend her as she still believed Morgra could pose a risk. She dies of a lump in her stomach, brought on by the guilt of her lie and its ties to the legend.
- Khaz is the Beta, or second-in-command. He is described as having gray fur with a red bushy tail, and has the second strongest jaws in the pack. He falls into a wolf pit later in the book, due to being baited in by a big raw chunk of meat hanging from a branch above a clutter of leaf-covered sticks above the pit (commonly known as a hunters pit fall trap), laden with spikes at the bottom, and dies due to a spike piercing his chest. During his final moments, he speaks his last words mainly to Kipcha, who he was going to possibly (though he already did) mate with for cubs; after his tragic death, Kipcha is left in a deep state of what seemed to be depression.
- Bran (wolf) is the pack's Sikla(omega), or weakest member. He is very skittish and often backs away from confrontations. However, he fights off a group of the Night Hunters to save his pack, later dying from the wounds he had sustained in the process. He had a distinctive smudge of black around his right eye.
- Kipcha is the sister of Huttser. She mates with Khaz secretly, but she and her unborn pups die as she is smashed against a rock when she falls into a river. It is implied that she purposefully lets herself die when swept in the river, likely absorbed with grief from Khaz’s death as well.
- Skart, a steppe eagle, is Tsarr's Helper and mentor. When Larka was trapped in the fire, Skart saved her life by showing her a way out of the flames. He then becomes Larka's Helper as well as Tsarr's. Skart is an extremely proud and somewhat haughty animal, but proves to often be kind and helpful to Larka. Larka later discovers that Skart had known about Fell believing he was Wolfbane all along, and likely did not tell Larka due to the weight of the news.
- Skop is Palla's brother and also the one who brought Kar to the pack, but then left in search for the Rebels. He couldn't find the Rebels, and after a few years, found a lone wolf in a cave and pleaded for food and shelter, while carrying the burden of a large wound on his side. He soon found out that the lone wolf is none other than Kar. He ends up slowly dying.
- Slavka is the leader of the rebel wolves. She was forced to kill her own cubs when she was younger as humans were about to invade her home, leading to her fiery need for revenge and bitterness, when she meets Huttser and Palla. Originally completely anti-superstition, after she met Larka she began to believe in the power of the Sight. Morgra gained control of her after she released the Searchers, spirits of the dead. After Morgra and Larka died, Morgra's power over Slavka was lost and Slavka approached Huttser, Palla, Kar and Fell for forgiveness and the latter accepted her into their pack. It is consistently noted that Slavka looks strikingly similar to Larka, due to a similar coat, but Slavka has shades of grey and more scars.
- Tsarr is Larka's mentor. He is an old wolf who had the Sight, but it has since faded. He helped Jarla to steal the human child. It was his idea for the child to ride on wolves' backs such as Tsarr's back after realizing he's too heavy to carry in their mouths. Tsarr was one of the main wolves to protect and raise him. Tsarr died trying to rescue the baby from Morgra, and failed. He was very close to Bran. His Helper is Skart.
- Tsinga is Brassa's sister. Brassa and Tsinga had a falling out as young wolves. Tsinga is a fortune teller who lives on her own in the Valley of Shadows. She is blind and feared by others. The pack seek her out to help Larka with the Sight and to tell them how to escape Morgra's curse.
- Bran (human) is the human child that was stolen from his family and is used for Larka, and the Sight. He is named after Bran the wolf. Jarla, Tsarr, and Larka all died for the human cub so he can live. This human child was found by the wolves, except for Morgra. After Tsarr failed to save Bran, it was Huttser who rescued him, and brought the child on his back, to safety. In the end, Fell brought Bran back to his home. Fell knew that the child wasn't happy saying goodbye, but Fell knew he had to.
- Jarla is a grey wolf who suckled Bran at first. Then she was killed by Rebels and passed the duty on to Larka.

== Morgra and the Pup ==
A vixen was rooting around the den one day. Morgra was the only one who saw it, and so grabbed a pup to save it from the vixen. However, in her panic, she bit down too hard and snapped its neck. When Morgra went to bury it, the pack found her and accused her of stealing and killing it. She was exiled from the pack. Later, it was revealed that Brassa was the only one in the pack who witnessed the event but did not stand up for her as she believed Morgra could still pose a risk. Rumour was that Morgra felt bitter that she couldn't have pups of her own, so she stole a pup from her own pack. After tasting a fellow wolf's blood, it was said that a wolf couldn't get enough and so kept killing its own.

== The Searchers ==
The Searchers are the ghosts of wolves that have died. They can be summoned by the Summoning Howl, which can only be used by one with the power of the Sight. If the Searchers touch a living wolf, then that wolf can have its mind read and controlled by the one that used the Summoning Howl. The Searchers are neither good nor evil, but they have to do what the Summoner commands. These wolves are found in the "Red Meadow" which can only be reached when a wolf who possesses the Sight makes a kill, sleeps, and then calls Fenris's name (a Varg god). Once that has been done they can walk the pathways of death, but there is a chance that they might not be able to return.

== The Balkar ==
The Balkar (also called "Night Hunters") are a group of Draggas, or alpha male wolves, who do Morgra's bidding. They are vicious and will do anything their leader asks of them (though not always without some uncertainty about it) even if it will lead them to their own death. Before, they were led by Tratto, a great Dragga who let all wolves live in peace and freedom, who then was murdered by Morgra, who fed him lies in his old age.

Eventually, his blessing, known as Tratto’s Blessing which permitted wolves to enter other wolves' territory, was changed into Larka's Blessing for all she did at Harja.

== Sight ==
The Sight is a power that very few wolves have, and it is difficult to control. It is believed by some that the true power of the Sight is to heal one's mind and body. Only a very small amount is known about the Sight, and most wolves consider it to be a myth. Wolves who have the gift of the Sight have potential to have these powers:

- The ability to see through the eyes of Lera (wild animals) and feel their pain when hunting them.
- The ability to look into water and see visions of the past, present and future.
- The ability to talk to birds and to see through the eyes of a bird. (Goes with the first power)
- To bring forth the Vision by looking through the eyes of a human at the citadel of Harja and enslave all the Lera to their will.
- To howl to the Searchers/Fenris, and either summon them to do one's bidding, or enter the Red Meadow (or field of the dead) and speak with the dead, summoning them with fresh meat from a recent kill.
- The ability to look into the eyes of other Lera and control their will.
- A telekinetic power used to throw physical items or creatures, or hold them in place.
