= Andrea Beck =

Canadian children's writer

- Born: 1956 (age 69–70); Montreal, Quebec, Canada
- Occupations: Author and Illustrator
- Writing career
- Genre: Children's literature

Andrea Lynn Beck (born October 25, 1956) is a Canadian illustrator living in Unionville, Ontario. Beck is well-known for her best-selling Elliot Moose children's book series and the spin-off Elliot Moose television show, which aired in Canada for ten years. Beck's recent publications include the Pierre Le Poof trilogy and the popular Goodnight, Canada. Beck was born in Montreal. Her book, Good Morning Canada, was given away to 550,000 first grade students in Canada in 2017 through the TD Grade One Book Giveaway, Canada's largest free book distribution program.

== Selected works ==
- Good Morning, Canada, 2016, Scholastic Canada
- Goodnight, Canada, 2012, North Winds Press
- Pierre in the Air, 2011, Orca Book Publishers
- Pierre's Friends, 2010, Orca Book Publishers
- Elliot's Fire Truck, 2010, Orca Book Publishers.
- Pierre Le Poof, Orca Book Publishers, 2009, Preschool-grade 3.
- Buttercup's Lovely Day, Orca Book Publishers, 2008, Preschool-grade 3.
- Elliot's Emergency, Kids Can Press, 1998. Preschool-grade 3.
- Elliot Bakes a Cake, Kids Can Press, 1999. Preschool-grade 3.
- Elliot's Shipwreck, Kids Can Press, 2000. Preschool-grade 3.
- Elliot's Bath, Kids Can Press, 2000. Preschool-grade 3.
- Elliot Digs for Treasure, Kids Can Press, 2001. Preschool-grade 3.
- Elliot Gets Stuck, Kids Can Press, 2002. Preschool-grade 3.
- Elliot's Noisy Night, Kids Can Press, 2002. Preschool-grade 3.
- Elliot's Great Big Lift-the-Flap Book, Kids Can Press, 2003. Preschool-kindergarten.
- The Waiting Dog. Illustration. Kids Can Press, 2003. Grades 3 up.
- Elliot's Christmas Surprise, Kids Can Press, 2003. Preschool-grade 3.
