= The Ongoing Adventures of Rocket Llama =

Webcomic

- Author(s): Alex Langley, Nick Langley
- Website: http://www.rocketllama.com
- Current status/schedule: No longer published or available online
- Launch date: April 2007 (comic); July 2008 (webcomic)
- Publisher(s): Rocket Llama World Headquarters, LLC
- Genre: Furry/Comedy/Adventure

The Ongoing Adventures of Rocket Llama was a webcomic starring "a high-flying llama, a sword-swinging cat, and a rocket as loyal as a cowboy hero's horse." Created by Alex Langley while he was a student at Henderson State University, the comic first appeared in a comic book titled The Workday Comic.

== The Workday Comic ==
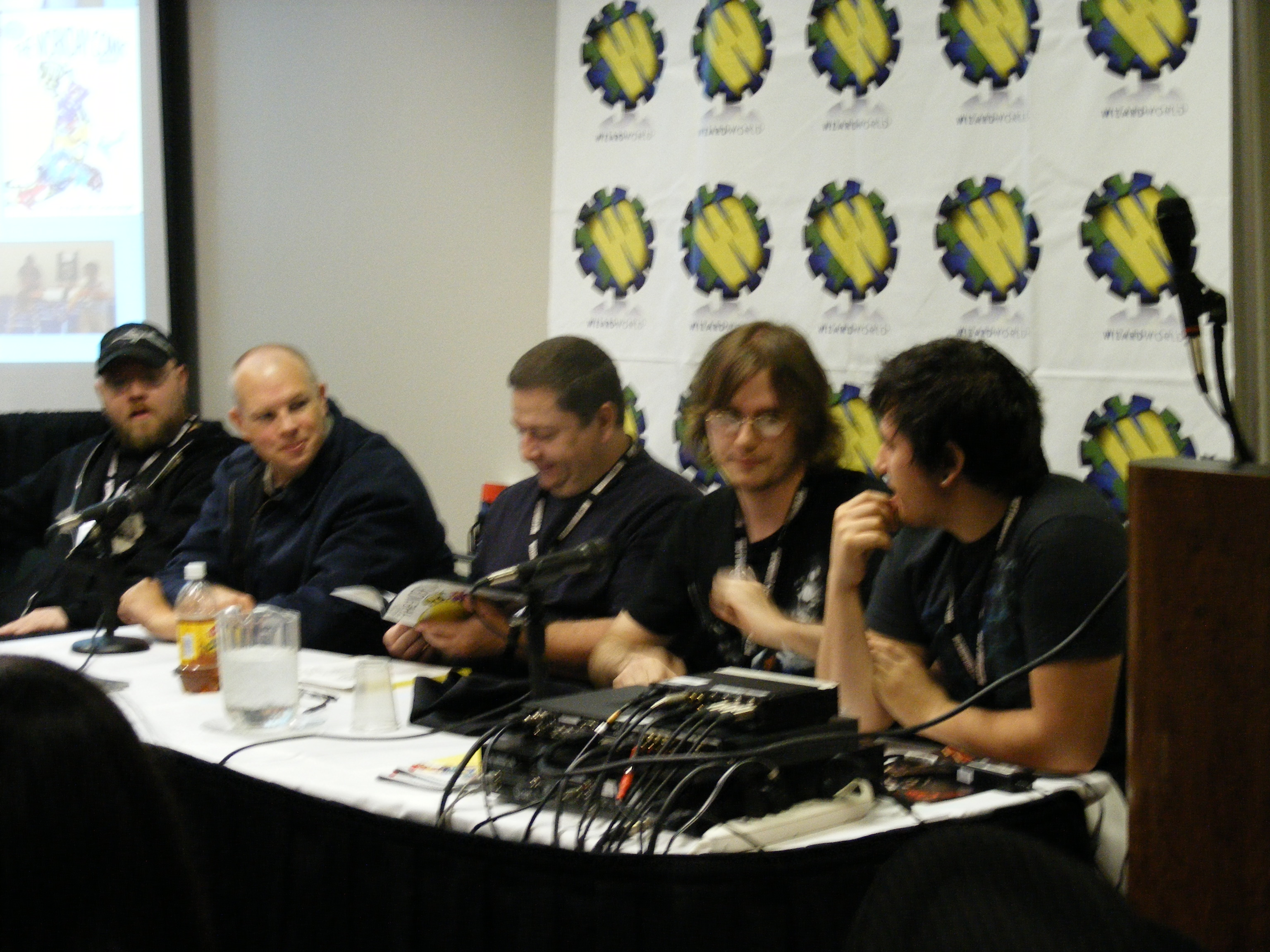
Left to right: Jacen Burrows, Jason Henderson, and Phil Hester examine The Workday Comic featuring Rocket Llama's debut while Rocket Llama Ground Crew members Nick Langley and Marko Head discuss the comic's creation during a Wizard World panel.

For The Workday Comic comics anthology, a spin-off of Scott McCloud's 24-Hour Comics, comics creators each wrote and drew their own eight-page stories in eight hours in April, 2007, on Friday the 13th, which turned into an ongoing publication. Rocket Llama debuted in one of the first issue's six stories, the first story completed.

Co-presenting with comics author and scholar Danny Fingeroth (Dazzler, Spider-Man, Superman on the Couch) during a Comics Arts Conference panel at 2008's Comic-Con International in San Diego, California, the creators explained how the first Rocket Llama story evolved into a webcomic. Whether despite the original story's childlike art or because of it, the Rocket Llama story proved to be the most popular in the 2007 anthology collection of the eight-hour comics. After comic artist Stephen R. Bissette, an instructor at the Center for Cartoon Studies and comic book artist best known for his work on Swamp Thing with Alan Moore, read all of the stories in the first volume of The Workday Comic, he remarked, "That llama's gonna stick with me."

== Debut story ==
The full title of Rocket Llama's debut story in The Workday Comic No. 1 (spring, 2007) was "The Ongoing Adventures of Rocket Llama #112: 'Trouble in Paradise'". The story introduced the taciturn hero Rocket Llama and his talkative sidekick, an anthropomorphic cat named Bartholemew 'Bart' Meowsenhausen, who find themselves stranded on an island after a battle with an enemy called Jetpack Dog. Spherical islanders capture them and then challenge them to combat. A villain named Böwser vön Überdog arrives with Jetpack Dog and, in a sudden Star Wars parody, summons a giant robot known as the Super Robot Dog Walker which blasts a volcano to bits. Before it can fire a second blast, Rocket Llama destroys it by getting it to swallow a pot of water and backfire. The story ends with Böwser tied up and the heroes using the giant robot dog head as a boat to get themselves home, with the promise of the next story to be titled, "Yuck! Yukon!"

== E-zine ==
Ezine contributor Action Flick Chick interviews The Incredible Hulk star Lou Ferrigno. 2008.

Following Zuda Comics' style guidelines, Nick Langley redrew the story with a less childlike drawing style in webcomic form for online publication as the flagship title for the website rocketllama.com. The Rocket Llama World Headquarters e-zine has an affiliation of websites featuring webcomics, art, entertainment reviews, and scholarly studies of comics.

With support from university resources, the creators assembled a "herd your nerds" support system of contributors working together. In addition to The Ongoing Adventures of Rocket Llama, e-zine features from the Rocket Llama Ground Crew include Action Flick Chick movie reviews by G4TV's Next Woman of the Web, cosplayer Katrina Hill; The Action Chick webcomic; Marko's Corner comics, cartoon arts, and podcasts by Marko Head; Reddie Steady comics for college newspapers; The Workday Comic, the 8-hour comics which spawned Rocket Llama; You Can't Do That on the Internet film crossover comics; interviews (e.g., Blair Butler, Dan DiDio, Steve Niles, Seth Green); convention reports; gaming news; blogs; and other articles.

== Online comic ==
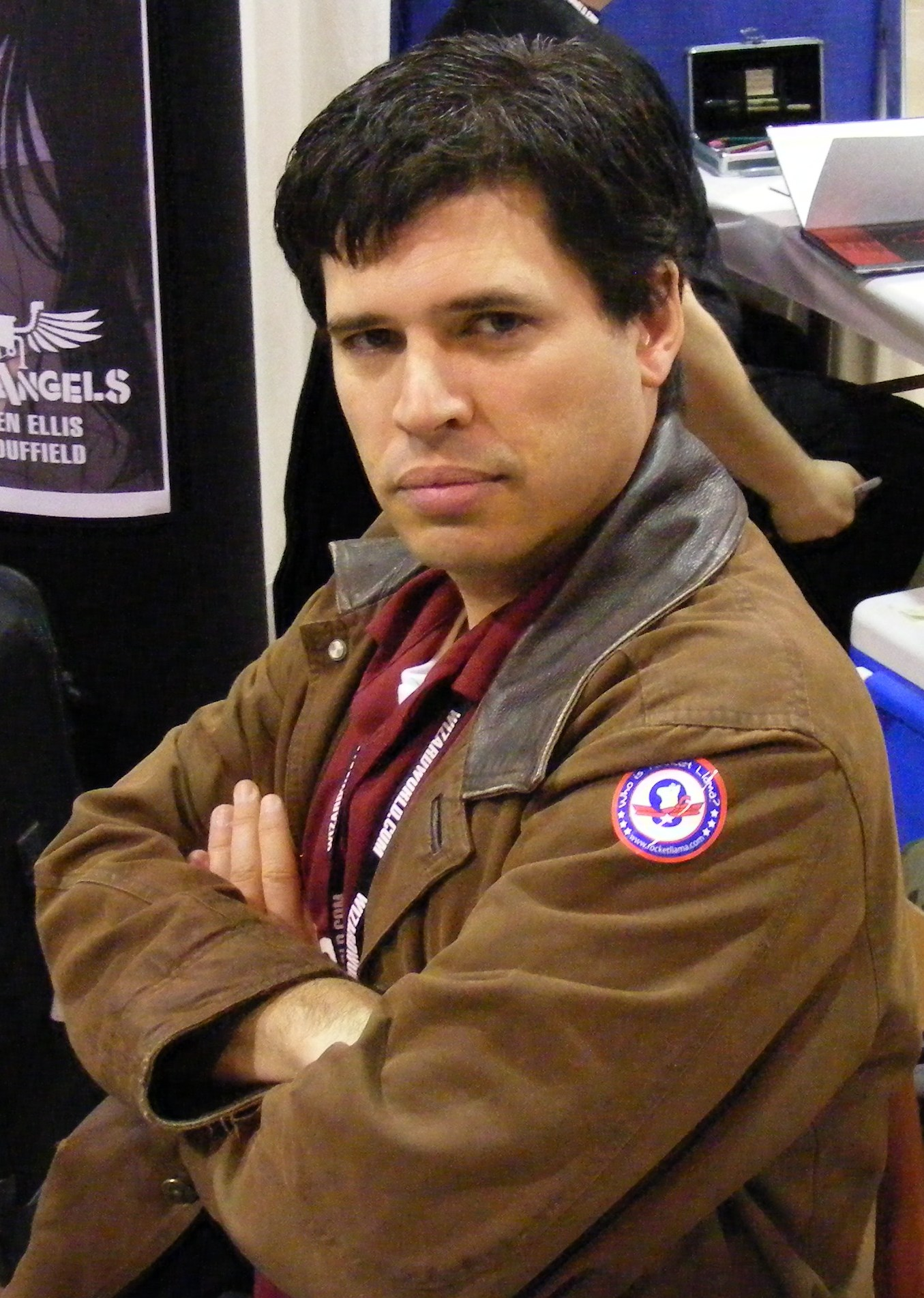
Saturday Night Live writer/The Zombie Survival Guide author Max Brooks shows off his Rocket Llama patch.

The online story featured a new cover and omitted a one-page gag, a preview for an unrelated Stealth Potato comic, which had appeared as an intermission in the middle of the original story. The original story also appeared online as the comic's "ashcan copy."

The authors present the Rocket Llama stories metafictionally as the world's oldest comic book, established in 1916, which they allegedly rediscovered and are adapting into webcomics. "Deep underground, in an archaic vault we searched until we found the fabled tales. As both the current production team behind The Ongoing Adventures of Rocket Llama and appreciators of such groundbreaking literature, we have taken it upon ourselves to restore these classic issues to a glory more befitting a modern, digital age."

Although every "issue" is presented with panels and screens in the correct order for each story, the issues are presented out of order as if readers were discovering old issues of a classic comic book in a seemingly haphazard order, however they come to find them. After the redrawn number #112's online publication came the serialized time travel story #136–137, "Time Flies When You're on the Run," appearing one page at a time throughout each week and expanding the cast with characters like the scientist Professor Percival Penguin and cavedogs who joined them by stowing away in the heroes' time rocket during the supposed previous issue. Issue No. 152 followed with "The Tomb of Nosfur-Rattu".

Special Rocket Llama Says bonus features appear only in "ashcan" form drawn by the original creator. The only "modern" comic has been a one-page Halloween cartoon, supposedly an excerpt from issue #1110.

Kidjutsu, an all-ages webcomics site which publishes series such as Inverloch (webcomic) and Dandy & Company, publishes completed Rocket Llama issues. Palace in the Sky Publishing also carries the series.

== Characters ==
- Rocket Llama (llama)
- Bartholemew 'Bart' Meowsenhausen (cat)
- Henry 'Ahoy' Dingo (dingo)
- Professor Percival Penguin (penguin)
- Camwyn Godfrey (dog)
- Cavedogs (King Zug, Princess Oonga, Bonk, etc.)
- Buzz Hawkins (koala)
- Katherine O'Haira (cat)
- Chef Paulie (bear)
- Chef Gustav (goat, retired)

=== Antagonists ===
- Böwser vön Überdog (bulldog)
- Jetpack Dog (poodle)
- Islanders (??)
- Super Robot Dog Walker
- Baron Havelock Rivendare (cat)
- Ambrose (camel)
- Garibaldi the Minuscule Mastermind (gerbil)
- Nosfur-Rattu (vampire rat)

== Spin-off comic: The Action Chick ==
After website contributor Action Flick Chick Katrina Hill became G4TV's official Next Woman of the Web, she and the Rocket Llama creators spun off her Action Chick avatar which originated with Rocket Llama off into the character's own webcomic The Action Chick. In the comic, Hill becomes her avatar in the style of James Cameron's Avatar, with Sigourney Weaver, Richard Crenna, and various Predators appearing as supporting cast in movie parodies and mockups of popular culture.
