= Elliot Moose =

Children's picture book series

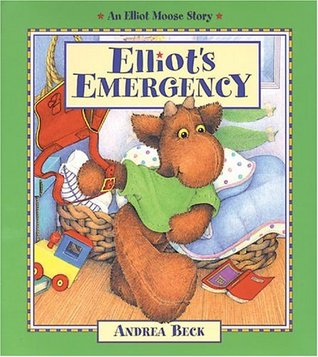
- Elliot's Emergency hardcover
- Author: Andrea Beck
- Illustrator: Andrea Beck
- Cover artist: Andrea Beck
- Country: Canada
- Language: English French
- Publisher: Kids Can Press
- No. of books: 10
- Website: www.andreabeck.com/books.html

Elliot Moose is a series of children's picture books, written and illustrated by Andrea Beck and published by Kids Can Press. In 1998, they were adapted into a television series of the same name.

== Characters ==
- Elliot - A moose plushy. He is very playful and cares a lot about his friends.
- Socks - A sock monkey. She is Elliot's best friend. She becomes a permanent purple colour in "Elliot's Bath".
- Beaverton - A beaver plushy. Elliot's friend and mentor.
- Amy - An anteater plushy. Loves to join Elliot outdoors.
- Paisley - A red and speckled teddy bear who wears yellow overalls.
- Lionel - A lion plushy.
- Angel - A Parrot plushy.
- Snowy and Puff - Twin Polar bear plushies.

== Books ==
- Elliot's Emergency (1998) follows the story of Elliot who is preparing to go on an adventure when he abruptly injures his leg! His friends try and remedy his healthy issues but to no avail. That is, until, his best friend, Socks, saves the day! This is a story is themed around the value of friendship!
- Elliot Bakes a Cake (1999) tells the story of Elliot and his friends trying to bake a cake for Lionel's birthday. After carefully following the instructions produced by Beaverton's recipe they still managed to fail. Luckily, through friendship and teamwork, they overcame this dilemma and were able to produce the best birthday cake they had ever tasted.
- Elliot's Shipwreck (2000) explores the high seas! Elliot and Socks decide to make Elliot's fantasy for sailing a reality when they collect materials to build a boat from the kitchen. During this adventure, they set out a picnic lunch when the boat starts sinking and become stranded in the middle of the pond. Elliot's dream of sailing just became a nightmare!
- Elliot's Bath (2000) is a messy one! Elliot and Socks are preparing for the talent show when they are covered in bright blue paint. Collectively, their friends fill up the sink so Elliot and Socks jump right in. They become so drenched they try everything to get dry before the talent show that night.
- Elliot Digs For Treasure (2001) is a tale of a map that Elliot, Socks, Beaverton and Angel find which they believe to reveal lost treasure. They go to the marked location and continuously dig until they realise there is no treasure to be found. The only problem becomes, they've dug a hole so deep they can't get out!
- Elliot Gets Stuck (2002) is a story of Elliot's attempted escape! Instead of waiting for Socks to let him out, he attempts to jump through the letter slot. Socks tries to help but to no avail, so she tries to find someone who can!
- Elliot's Noisy Night (2002). Elliot starts to hear and get anxious about noises, but the feeling is quickly dismissed by Beaverton. Later that night they become even louder and Elliot starts to feel scared again!
- Elliot's Christmas Surprise (2003). After receiving a red box before Christmas, unlike him, Elliot discovers his friends had not received an early gift. Elliot sets out to make gifts for each of them.
- Elliot's Great Big Lift-The-Flap Book (2003). A new format of flap book produced by Andrea Beck.
- Elliot's Fire Truck (2010) is a story about two friends constantly in competition. They try to find common ground between each other and realise they have more in common than they originally thought.
