= Zigby =

- Created by: Brian Paterson
- Voices of: Tracey Moore; Brian Drummond; Matt Hill; Michelle Doake; Roslyn Oades; Sharon Millerchip; Katherine Cohn; Jamie Croft
- Opening theme: "Zigby" performed by Justine Clarke
- Ending theme: Instrumental version of "Zigby"
- Countries of origin: Australia; Canada; Singapore
- Original language: English
- No. of seasons: 1
- No. of episodes: 52

Production
- Running time: 11 mins
- Production companies: Flying Bark Productions; Avrill Stark Entertainment; Big Animation

Original release
- Network: ABC Kids (Australia); Treehouse TV (Canada)
- Release: 6 April 2009 – 19 March 2013

Zigby the zebra is an anthropomorphic children's fictional character created by Scottish-born English author Brian Paterson. Zigby appears in a series of picture books and board books as well as in a 3D-animated television adaptation. It aired on Treehouse TV from 2009 to 2011 (with repeats from 2013 to 2015) in Canada and it was previously aired on CBeebies in the UK from 2009 to 2011.

Zigby lives in a treehouse in Mudwater Creek, on a lush tropical island. In a typical book or episode, the enthusiastic zebra "trots into trouble" through his slightly eccentric behavior. He is followed by his best friends McMeer the meerkat and Bertie Bird the anxious guinea fowl.

== Books ==
The following picture books for ages approximately 2–5 were published by HarperCollins:

- Zigby Camps Out (2002)
- Zigby Hunts for Treasure (2002)
- Zigby and the Ant Invaders (2003)
- Zigby Dives In (2003)
- Zigby and the Monster (2005)

Four board books (Go-Kart, The Picnic, The Birthday Party, Toy Box) appeared in 2004 with the same publisher. As of early 2005, 350,000 copies had been sold in fifteen countries.

== Television adaptation ==
The development of an animated series based on the character was announced in 2005. 52 3D-animated episodes of 11 minutes each were co-produced by companies in Australia, Singapore, and Canada. It was also acquired by German ZDF, BBC-owned CBeebies and by France 5 also Univision's Planeta U (dubbed in Spanish) in America. In Canada, it aired on Treehouse TV from February 23, 2009 to July 31, 2011 (with repeats from June 2013 to May 2015). In the UK, it aired on CBeebies from 2009 to early 2011. In Australia, it aired on ABC from March 25, 2009 to January 3, 2015. The series specifically targets 4 to 5 year olds with a wider target audience of 3 to 6 year olds.

=== Cast ===
- Tracey Moore as Zigby
- Brian Drummond as McMeer
- Matt Hill as Bertie Bird
- Michelle Doake
- Roslyn Oades
- Sharon Millerchip as Celeen
- Katherine Cohn as Wink / Tink
- Jamie Croft as Clem / Stink
