= Brian Paterson =

British artist

Brian Paterson (born 1949) is a British illustrator and author, best known for his work with children's book series Foxwood Tales and Zigby.

== Early and later life ==
Brian Paterson was born in Ayrshire in 1949. At the age of 12 his family moved to Somerset. He met a local girl, Cynthia, and they married in 1973. The couple initially moved to London where Brian worked as a designer by day and on developing his own style of illustrating by night. They then moved to Henley-on-Thames where they conceived Foxwood Tales, Cynthia writing and Brian illustrating. The couple were inspired by the countryside and wildlife around their home in Oxfordshire and the adventures of their three sons. In 2002 Brian Patterson started the children's book series about Zigby the zebra.

In approximately 2016 Brian and Cynthia Paterson went on to host the award-winning Caroe Farmhouse bed and breakfast in Otterham, north Cornwall. Brian currently concentrates on painting rather than illustration.

== Foxwood Tales ==
The Patersons produced eight books for the Foxwood Tales series. Cynthia wrote and Brian's watercolors illustrated the books. The series was published between 1985 and 1998 with over 1.3 million copies having been sold across 18 countries.

The series features anthropomorphic animals living in the Foxwood Village. Three friends, Harvey Mouse, Rue Rabbit and Willy Hedgehog engage in various adventures within their community. The Patersons drew inspiration from the English countryside and the activities of their three young sons.

=== Individual books ===
- Robbery at Foxwood (1985) – Search for robbers of a local store.
- The Foxwood Treasure (1985) – Adventures in historical intrigue while raising money for the new village hall.
- The Foxwood Kidnap (1986) – Rescue of Uncle Henry from the rats.
- The Foxwood Regatta (1986) – Foxwood Village prepares for the Regatta while the cheating rats scheme to win.
- The Foxwood Surprise (1988) – Christmas Eve party at the manor.
- The Foxwood Smugglers (1988) – Adventure on the high seas and an old lighthouse where the friends stumble across a band of smugglers.
- The Secret Valley (1998) – When Rosie Rabbit is sick, her friends find a healing herb through a new, mysterious friend in Secret Valley.
- The Magic Sleigh (1998) – A magic sleigh take the friends for their Christmas trees and then on to meet Father Christmas.

=== Omnibuses ===
- The Foxwood Treasury (1997) – includes The Foxwood Treasure, The Foxwood Regatta, The Foxwood Smugglers and The Foxwood Surprise
- The Foxwood Collection (1999) – includes Robbery at Foxwood, The Foxwood Kidnap, The Secret Valley and The Magic Sleigh

=== Merchandise ===
The Foxwood Tales characters appeared on merchandise including prints, china, cards and miniatures. Companies such as Wedgwood and Villeroy & Boch produced collectible pieces licensed from Foxwood Tales.

=== Japanese Miniseries ===
In 1991 an animation miniseries was developed for Japanese television and directed by Masaharu Endo. Fox Wood Tales (TV Miniseries)/(OAV) was originally released under the name Foxwood Monogatari. The three episode each run 25 minutes.

=== Academic study ===
Alice Martin at the University of Helsinki selected Foxwood Tales along with works by Lewis Carroll, Robert Louis Stevenson and Ted Hughes for her study of translation norms in practice

== Zigby ==
Nine Zigby books have been published to date:

- Zigby Camps Out (2002)
- Zigby Hunts for Treasure (2002)
- Zigby and the Ant Invaders (2003)
- Zigby Dives In (2003)
- Zigby and the Monster (2005)
- Zigby: The Picnic
- Zigby: The Birthday Party
- Zigby: The Go-Kart
- Zigby: The Toy Box

The characters were developed for a TV cartoon series.
