= David Clement-Davies =

British author and sculptor

- Born: 6 January 1964 (age 62); London
- Occupations: Author, Sculptor
- Writing career
- Genre: Animal Fantasy Fiction
- Notable works: Fire Bringer; The Sight; Scream of the White Bears

David Clement-Davies (born 6 January 1964) is a British author and sculptor. He is known for animal fantasy fiction The Sight, Fire Bringer and Fell (sequel to The Sight).

== Biography ==
David Clement-Davies was born in 1964 and went to Westminster School and Edinburgh University where he read History and English Literature, specialising in the Italian Renaissance, and Russian Literature and Society. He began his writing career as a freelance travel journalist, and his first novel, Fire Bringer, was published in 1999. It was followed by The Sight and Fell. He has also written a musical, two adult novels, and is currently working on a play, set in the present and the 17th century, called Startled Anatomies, alongside his children's books.

Clement-Davies lived in the Andalusia region of Spain, and in London. He now lives and works on sculpting in Pietrasanta, Italy, where he moved in 2017 with his dog Rascal.

== Bibliography ==
=== Animal Fantasy Fiction ===
1. Fire Bringer (1999)
2. The Sight (2002)
3. The Alchemists of Barbal (2005)
4. The Telling Pool
5. Fell (2007)
6. Michaelangelo's Mouse
7. The Blood Garden
8. Scream of the White Bears (2019)

=== Fire Bringer (1999) ===
Fire Bringer is a novel about Rannoch, a red deer, born in ancient Scotland on the same night that his father was murdered. But Rannoch is no ordinary deer; he is special, for he bears a white mark on his forehead resembling an oak leaf. To the Herla, as the red deer called themselves, this white mark holds great meaning and power, for it was stated in a prophecy that the deer who was born with the mark would bring freedom to all Herla in the future, and that the bearer of the oak mark would have the ability to communicate with all animals.

First however, Rannoch must survive. Bucks formerly brawled and fought for the leadership, but that way was erased completely, instead replaced by a Lord of Herds, Drail. His helper, Sgorr, who has militarised the herd by making the stags sharpen their horns, training and drilling the young bucks, and will take no resistance. He realises the threat Rannoch poses to his leadership. Rannoch escapes from the herd, but deep down in his heart, he knows that he must return, to unite the deer, and end Sgorr's reign of terror.

Richard Adams, author of the classic Watership Down, called Fire Bringer 'one of the best anthropomorphic fantasies known to him'. It was long-listed as a first novel for the Carnegie Medal in the UK. Fire Bringer and The Sight have received starred Kirkus Reviews, Famils Awards in the US, and made him a Booksense 76 Collection choice.

=== The Sight (2002) ===
Clement-Davies's second novel, The Sight, is set in Transylvania (modern-day Romania), and is about a pack of wolves, seeking shelter from the harsh winters in the shadow of an abandoned castle (named the "Stone Den"). Palla, the alpha female of the pack, is about to give birth to a litter. They are being pursued by Morgra, Palla's half-sister, and her raven, Kraar. Morgra possesses the gift of the Sight, a strange power that gives her many abilities, among them the power to look through the eyes and mind of birds. It is revealed to her that one of the cubs born to Palla (Larka), has the gift of the Sight, only far more powerful than her own ability. Morgra wishes to use this power, to take control of this world and the next, but the pack she hunts is brave and loving. They will do anything, and everything, to protect one of their own, even if it sets in motion a battle that will involve all of nature, including the creature the wolves fear most: Man.

The Sight was inspired by Clement-Davies' travel to Romania in the winter, 1990, where he learned of superstitious tales and local folklore (such as Dracula).

=== The Alchemists of Barbal (2005) ===
His third book, The Alchemists of Barbal, is an adventure story about a bold character named Silas Root.

==== Synopsis ====
The walled city of Barbal lies in the middle of the desert, where Mardak the Dark reigns supreme over the land. There is little knowledge of this mysterious master of Alchemy, except that he wears a golden mask and is ambitious for power and knowledge. Mardak's obsessions have already resulted in the imprisonment of the Lord Alchemist, his archrival. Now nothing, no one, stands in his path except for young Silas Root. Small and determined Silas sets off for Barbal armed with but a simple stone talisman and control over his own destiny. On his journey, he encounters a winged demon and even an army of lost souls. Can Silas muster the ultimate courage to confront and defeat such evil and the man behind the mask? Well – the future of magic depends on it.

=== The Telling Pool ===
Clement-Davies varied slightly from his animal tales when he published The Telling Pool in August 2005. The Telling Pool tells the story of Rhodri Falcon and his crusader father who become entangled in the war of a king and the machinations of a seductive sorceress – one who literally steals men's hearts. Rhodri must discover the hero within him, a hero the amazing magic of the Telling Pool links to ancient heroes and even more ancient faiths. While finding powers within him that he had no idea about Rhodri must reclaim his fathers heart before the damage is undoable.

With only two other novels The Telling Pool was short-listed for the Tir Na Nog prize for best foreign language novel set in or related to Wales.

=== Fell (2007) ===
Fell, released in October 2007, is a sequel of The Sight. In this continuation of the original story the complexities of Larka's brother, Fell, are further explored nearly five years following the initial story. Fell, now a 'Kerl' or loner, having been on a long spiritual journey in search of answers, has instead found himself another task for his lasting youth supposedly preserved by the strange power of the Sight. A human girl, Alina Sculcuvant, is strangely connected with the past of the black wolf now feared as a ghost or legend. Rescued from the snows as only a child by the shepherd Malduk, who throughout her growing years makes her "dress as a boy and work twice as hard as one".

Even stranger is the odd power Alina holds. The girl possesses the Sight. As the truth comes to the surface Alina finds herself on a journey of self-discovery just like Fell but not entirely willingly. Instead with the bounty of a King on her head she is forced to set off on a journey where her path is crossed by a strange, lonely black wolf, Fell. Her journeys consist of hardship and heart-loss as she learns the true history of her past, and the secrets of life itself.

Like The Sight, Fell further explores the relationship between man and animal in this successful continuation of his original story though travels a different path than the first novel making for a new, intriguing tale of this strange anti-hero.

In 2009, out of a publishing battle in the US and now 'disillusioned with so much of the climate of modern publishing' David Clement-Davies took back the eBook rights to his novels from all his publishers, in the UK and US, and founded his own Press – PhoenixArkPress – 'The Storyteller's Publisher', founded by writers and artists, for writers and artists. He started a blog, to tell some truths about books and publishing, to create 'cultural essays' and to give readers a novel 'as it is written' – "Dragon in the Post".

=== Michelangelo's Mouse ===
One of his first stories in three years, published in 2011 and for a younger audience, it is the tale of Jotto, the brave mouse with sea blue eyes and a leather waistcoat, who can draw perfect circles and who escapes his brow-beaten home to become an artist in the dangerous Renaissance city of Florence. There he has many adventures, meets none other than the great Michelangelo himself and learns how to become 'famous'. It mixes real history with comic fact in a romp through art and culture, that is basically about the fighting artistic spirit.

=== The Blood Garden ===
David Clement-Davies made his first outing into adult fiction in early 2011 under the pen name David C Davies. The Blood Garden is a very adult thriller, that virtually creates a new genre, the vampire and modern crime story in one. It is highly wrought, set in Covent Garden in London and at Britain's Royal Ballet, as well as many other London locations, where he intricately weaves his common themes of fantasy versus reality, with a dark love story.

== Future books ==
Clement-Davies is currently working on a new series too, the first of which will be called The Terror Time Spies. He also wrote a book called Scream of the White Bears
