= Fire Bringer =

1999 novel by David Clement-Davies

- Fire Bringer cover
- Author: David Clement-Davies
- Cover artist: Kenny McKendry
- Language: English
- Genre: Young adult, Fantasy
- Publisher: MacMillan UK (UK) & Puffin Books (US)
- Publication date: October 1999
- Publication place: United Kingdom
- Media type: Print (Hardback & Paperback)
- Pages: 512 (US Paperback)
- ISBN: 0-330-39010-4

Fire Bringer is a young adult fantasy novel by David Clement-Davies published in 1999 in the United Kingdom and 2000 in the United States. It tells the story of Rannoch, a red deer whose life is the subject of an old forest prophecy.

== Plot ==
Fire Bringer tells the story of Rannoch, a red deer born in 13th-century Scotland. Rannoch is born with a white mark on his forehead resembling an oak leaf, the symbol of the deer's god Herne. To the Herla, as the deer are called among animals, the white mark is the symbol of a prophecy foretelling the birth of a deer with the ability to communicate with all animals, destined to bring freedom to his people.

The story begins the night Rannoch's father, Brechin, is murdered, and his mother, Eloin, is forced to become the mate of the Lord of the Herd Drail. Rannoch is adopted by another doe. However, Drail decides to kill Rannoch and the other fawns out of fear of the prophecy. When Eloin finds out, she warns Bracken and the other mothers that their fawns are in danger; only some of them listen. Rannoch, Bracken, five other fawns, and their mothers flee Drail's herd and take refuge.

Soon, however, human hunters attack their new herd. Rannoch helps his friends by distracting one of the hunters' dogs but is injured in the process, after which the other deer believe him to be dead. Rannoch is found by a human boy who takes him home, where the boy and his mother keep him safe while his leg heals.

Meanwhile, one of Drail's servants, Sgorr, tricks and murders Drail and militarizes the herd; first by making the stags sharpen their antlers, and then training the young bucks and having them gore each other in the forehead to make permanent scars. Sgorr slowly expands his territory over many herds, intending to make himself lord over all deer. He finds the herd where Bracken and the other mothers and fawns have hidden, and the herd's new leader gives them up to him.

After recovering from his injury, Rannoch struggles growing up without a herd. He stays close to the human dwelling and slowly begins to lose his ability to speak to other animals. One day, a friendly mole tells him his time around the humans is changing him, which inspires Rannoch to leave. He returns to his herd, intending to learn more about the prophecy.

When he finds his friends again, they embark on a journey to the mountains to find the mythical herd of the deer god, Herne. Herne's herd is not the utopia the deer believed it would be, and after Rannoch leaves it, he and his friends form their own herd to shelter others from Sgorr. However, Rannoch and his new herd disagree about whether they should fight back. Rannoch, torn between taking action and keeping the peace, tries to dissuade them, but his friends leave him to join the fight.

Searching for answers alone, Rannoch discovers that Sgorr has a terrible secret: he once killed a human child and ate its heart. Now knowing Sgorr is evil, Rannoch returns to his friends on the battlefield. He defeats Sgorr, aided by all the animals in the forest, and in doing so fulfills the prophecy.

== Characters ==
- Brechin (Red Deer)

Rannoch's father and Eloin's mate. A respected Outrider captain who was killed by Drail and Sgorr.

- Eloin (Red Deer)

Rannoch's mother and Brechin's mate. She successfully saves Rannoch from Drail and Sgorr, allowing him to escape. She was then forced to become part of Drail's (and later Sgorr's) harem.

- Rannoch (Red Deer)

The main protagonist, son of Brechin and Eloin, and Willow's mate. He was targeted by Sgorr and Drail due to having a white oak leaf on his forehead, which prompted him to run away from the herd early with his friends. Throughout his journey, he overthrows Herne's Herd and is the 'Healer of all Lera'. He also leads his herd to fight Sgorr, and eventually claims victory.

- Sgorr (Red Deer)

The main antagonist. He has a strange and menacing appearance with only one eye, no antlers, and sharpened teeth. Sgorr is depicted as sadistic and power-hungry and is responsible for the creation of 'The Great Herd' and an army of violent, scarred deer called 'Sgorrla.'

- Bhreac (Red Deer)

An old doe who fled the herd with Rannoch. She died saving Quaich from a river.

- Blindweed (Red Deer)

An old, wise storyteller who was friends with Bhreac, Rannoch, and Eloin. He was killed by Drail and Sgorr after he was overheard talking about the prophecy.

- Bracken (Red Deer)

Bracken pretended to be Rannoch's mother for a short period of time to protect Rannoch from the Sgorrla. She was later killed by one of Sgorr's assassins.

- Drail (Red Deer)

The first antagonist and 'Lord of Herds.' He was later betrayed and killed by Sgorr, who took his place.

- Tain (Red Deer)

One of Rannoch's friends, who later became an Outrider Captain.

- Thistle (Red Deer)

One of Rannoch's childhood friends. When the time came to fight Sgorr, Thistle led the deer that were willing to fight into battle. He was killed by a Sgorrla in the Final Battle.

- Bankfoot (Red Deer)

Rannoch's best friend, who was often bullied by Thistle as a fawn because of his stutter and weight. However, he eventually became Captain of the Outriders.

- Peppa (Red Deer)

Willow's twin sister and Bankfoot's love interest. She was very kind and gentle but was killed in the battle against Sgorr.

- Willow (Red Deer)

Peppa's twin sister and Rannoch's love interest, who later becomes his mate.

- Birrmagnur (Reindeer)

A reindeer and one of Rannoch's good friends. He was brought to the High Land by men.

- Colquhar (Red Deer)

An antagonist at first, Colquar was an Outrider who turned Rannoch's friends over to Sgorr. Later on in the story, he kills the Lord of his new herd and become Lord himself. However, after being called to meet with Sgorr about his leadership; he was captured, blinded, and forced to live in Sgorr's herd. However, Colquar was able to redeem himself when he was able to buy the Outriders time during the Final Battle.

- Bandach (Red Deer)

A young buck who gives Brechin the message about the "council meeting" that Brechin was expected at. However the meeting was actually a trap that led to Brechin's death.

- Narl (Red Deer)

Sgorr's loyal servant.

- Haarg (Red Deer)

The lead stag of the Slave Herd that later befriends Rannoch.

- Liath (Red Deer)

The head doe of the Slave Herd.

- Crak (Raven)

A raven who helps Rannoch while on his journey. He persuades many birds to help Rannoch in The Final Battle.

- The Wolf

A wolf whose life gets saved by Rannoch, who heals his injuries and brings him back to health. Later the wolf gets his pack to help Rannoch in The Final Battle.

- Rurl (Seal)

A seal who helps Rannoch by telling him about the ocean and man. He also takes Rannoch to the island where Sgorr's secret is buried.

- Teek (Roe Deer)

A deer who informs Rannoch about Herne's Herd.

- The Mole

A friend to Rannoch while he is being kept by Liam. He helps Rannoch realize that the boy has tamed him and is keeping him as a pet, and convinces Rannoch to leave.

- Shira (Red deer)

Tain's mother. She was kept captive by Sgorr so that he could use her to control Elion.

- Canisp (Red Deer)

Bankfoot's mother. She was kept captive by Sgorr so that he could use her to control Eloin.

- Alyth (Red Deer)

Thistle's mother. She was killed by Sgorrla while Rannoch's friends were fleeing.

- Braan (Red Deer)

An Outrider of the Herd on the Loch.

- Liam (Human Boy)

A human boy who manages to tame Rannoch, but later releases him. Later in the story, Liam kills Sgorr but lets Rannoch live.

- Quaich (Red Deer)

One of Rannoch's friends who stayed in the Deer Park with his mother due to his weakened condition, but he later returns to fight Sgorr.

== Comparisons ==
This book has been compared to the novel Watership Down by Richard Adams, who is also a British author.

== Sources ==
(1)
(2) http://umanitoba.ca/cm/vol6/no2/firebringer.html
(3) http://www.rambles.net/clement_firebr02.html
