= List of fictional turtles =

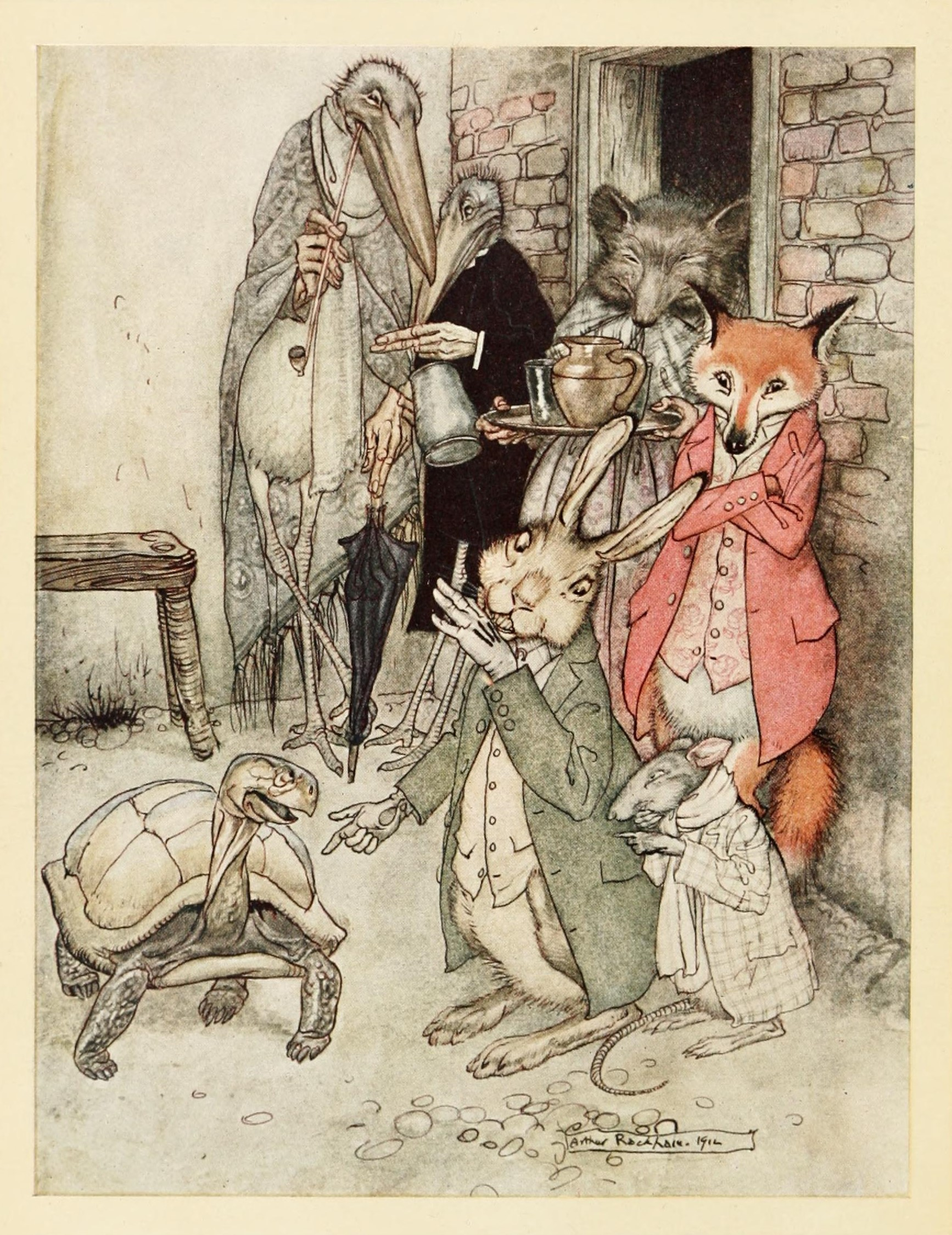
"The Tortoise and the Hare", from an edition of Aesop's Fables illustrated by Arthur Rackham, 1912

This is a list of fictional turtles, tortoises, and terrapins from literature, movies and other elements of popular culture.

== In mythology, legends, and folklore ==
Character	Origin	Notes
Aspidochelone		A giant turtle sea monster
Br'er Turtle (Br'er Tarrypin)	Uncle Remus's folk tales	
Genbu	Japanese mythology	
Kappa	Japanese mythology	A turtle-like humanoid
Kurma	Hindu mythology	The second of the dashavatars of Vishnu
Mbeku	West African mythology	Trickster tortoise in Igbo and West African folktales
Minogame	Urashima Taro	A sea turtle, is said to be Otohime, daughter of the Emperor of the Sea
The Tortoise	The Tortoise and the Hare	from Aesop's Fables
Turtle Island	North American Indigenous Peoples	Lenape "Great Turtle", Iroquois "Hah-nu-nah"
World Turtle	Hindu mythology	Also referred to as Akupara, the Cosmic Turtle or the World-bearing Turtle

== In literature ==
Character	Origin	Author	Notes
Alderman Ptolemy Tortoise	The Tale of Mr. Jeremy Fisher	Beatrix Potter	One of Jeremy's two friends who brings him some salad for dinner.
Alfie	Esio Trot	Roald Dahl	Illustrated by Quentin Blake.
Cassiopeia	Momo	Michael Ende	
Clothahump	Spellsinger	Alan Dean Foster	Aged turtle wizard.
Fastitocalon	The Adventures of Tom Bombadil	J. R. R. Tolkien	A sea turtle the size of a small island, fooling mariners who attempted to land on him.
Franklin	Franklin the Turtle	Paulette Bourgeois	Illustrated by Brenda Clark. Adapted into an Animated Series and a CGI Series.
Great A'Tuin	Discworld	Terry Pratchett	The World Turtle, carrying the four elephants which hold the Discworld.
Leatherback turtle	The Wreck of the Zanzibar	Michael Morpurgo	A turtle nursed back to health by Laura and Granny May believes he participated in the Wreck of the Zanzibar.
Mock Turtle	Alice's Adventures in Wonderland	Lewis Carroll	
Morla	The Neverending Story	Michael Ende	A giant, wise swamp turtle.
Mudface	Doctor Dolittle	Hugh Lofting	Particularly Doctor Dolittle and the Secret Lake
Om	Small Gods	Terry Pratchett	A god briefly incarnated as a tortoise.
Ove	Bert Diaries	Anders Jacobsson and Sören Olsson	Illustrated by Sonja Härdin.
Plautus/Lightning	Arcadia (play)	Tom Stoppard	In both the past and present portions of the play.
Slow-and-Solid	Just So Stories	Rudyard Kipling	A tortoise who is one of the protagonists the story.
Spotty	Old Mother West Wind	Thornton Burgess	
The Tortoise	What the Tortoise Said to Achilles	Lewis Carroll	Also in sequel dialogs in Gödel, Escher, Bach: an Eternal Golden Braid by Douglas Hofstadter
Tortoise	À rebours	Joris-Karl Huysmans	
Yertle and Mack	Yertle the Turtle and Other Stories	Dr. Seuss	A popular children's tale that cautions against despotism. Yertle is the grandiose king of the pond who decides he rules whatever he can see—and makes the turtles stack up to the sky. Mack is the turtle at the bottom who ultimately rebels and brings the stack crashing down.
Maturin	The Dark Tower (series) & It (novel)	Stephen King	Considered the most powerful of the guardians of the beams.
Minn	Minn of the Mississippi	Holling C. Holling	
Tortoise	The Grapes of Wrath [Chapter 3]	John Steinbeck	A tortoise crosses the road to get to the sea. Its struggle to do so (even being hit by a car and land on its back) can be read allegorically for the struggles the Joad family has to endure.
'The tortoise(s)'	The Tortoises [org. title: Die Schildkröten]	Veza Canetti	The novel takes place in Anschluss-Vienna and features tortoises in which a local craftsman intends to engrave swastikas as sign of welcome to the expected Nazis. Heartbroken about this practice, the Jewish protagonist Kain buys all the untouched ones and takes them home. One of them, however, still naturally features a swastika-like form on its shell. Kain's brother Werner, a stone specialist, particularly identifies with the tortoises. Yet all Jewish characters appear to do so in some way. Being forced to dine with the SA official Pilz, they present him with mock-turtle soup they do not eat themselves (as it is not kosher), one of them says: "We are the tortoises." Additionally, remarks to other popular uses of the tortoise's body (e.g. for combs) are briefly drawn attention to. Although the animal itself plays a minor character in the novel, it arguably stands symbolically for the novels characters and their resistance.

== In comics ==
Character	Origin	First appearance	Notes
Arnold	Weber		Best friend of Weber the ladybird in Gommaar Timmermans' comic series Weber.
Burocracia	Quino		Mafalda's pet
Caroline	Boule et Bill		Bill's best friend.
Churchy LaFemme	Pogo		
Donatello	Teenage Mutant Ninja Turtles	Teenage Mutant Ninja Turtles #1 (May 1984)	Nicknames: Don, Donnie; Weapon of choice: The bō (long staff); Bandana: red (Mirage/Image Comics), purple (elsewhere)
Elvis	Elvis		
Fillmore	Sherman's Lagoon		
Genbu	Yu Yu Hakusho		Villainous member of the saint beasts.
Jack (Dolly)	Ox Tales		
Jinmen	Devilman		Villain who puts people's faces into his shell.
John the Turtle	B.C.		A friend of the Dookie Bird
Leonardo	Teenage Mutant Ninja Turtles	Teenage Mutant Ninja Turtles #1 (May 1984)	Nickname: Leo; Weapon of choice: the Katana (sword); Bandana: red (Mirage/Image Comics), blue (elsewhere)
Michelangelo	Teenage Mutant Ninja Turtles	Teenage Mutant Ninja Turtles #1 (May 1984)	Nicknames: Mike, Mikey; Weapon of choice: The Nunchaku (nunchucks); Bandana: red (Mirage/Image Comics), orange (elsewhere)
Millennium Tortoise	Image Comics		Goes to Aqua Leung
Pyko	Marvel Comics	The Incredible Hulk #271 (February 1982)	An anthropomorphic turtle and toymaker who was introduced as a supporting character of Rocket Raccoon.
Raphael	Teenage Mutant Ninja Turtles	Teenage Mutant Ninja Turtles #1 (May 1984)	Nickname: Raph; Weapon of choice: The sai Bandana: red
Skalman	Bamse		Friend of the title character
Super-Turtle	DC Comics	Adventure Comics #304 (January 1963)	Super-Turtle is an anthropomorphic turtle-like alien and parody of Superman.
Terrific Whatzit	DC Comics	Funny Stuff #1 (Summer 1944)	Merton McSnurtle is a shopkeeper who lives in the town of Zooville. He becomes a superhero after the entitles Prince Highness and Prince Lowness grant him superhuman speed to test what would happen if a civilian acquired superpowers.
Timmy-Joe Terrapin/Fastback	Captain Carrot and his Amazing Zoo Crew	The New Teen Titans #16 (February 1982)	Fastback is a member of the Zoo Crew and the nephew of the Terrific Whatzit, with both possessing superhuman speed.
Tim Turtle	Lionel's Kingdom		

== In film and television ==
Character	Origin	Notes
Crush	Finding Nemo	A sea turtle who is 150 years old in the film. He has a son named Squirt.
Gamera	Daiei Motion Picture Company	A giant, flying, fire-breathing turtle.
Giant sea turtle	The Bermuda Depths	A supernatural sea monster.
Grand Master Oogway	Kung Fu Panda	An aged giant tortoise, who was the kung fu master of Shifu.
Granny Pearl	Pajanimals	
Howard	Razzle Dazzle	
Kamoebas	Space Amoeba	
Lenny Turteltaub	BoJack Horseman	A turtle who is a Hollywood producer.
The Lion Turtle	Avatar: The Last Airbender	
Madge	It's a Big Big World	
Morla	The Neverending Story	
Pong Pagong	Batibot	
Shelly	Sesame Street	A Muppet turtle who appeared on Sesame Street.
Slowcoach	Flower Pot Men	
Socrates	Common Side Effects	The main character's pet Peruvian land tortoise who plays an important role in the plot.
Tardy Turtle	Greg the Bunny	A slow-witted set assistant.
Terraspin	Ben 10: Ultimate Alien	A turtle-like alien.
Tokka	Teenage Mutant Ninja Turtles II: The Secret of the Ooze	
Tortoise John	Rango	Mayor of Dirt, the desert town setting in the film.
Tuck	Wonder Pets	Tuck is a four-year-old turtle. He is described as sensitive with an emotional connection to living things
Verne	Over the Hedge	A cynical box turtle and the leader of the animal group.
Venus	Ninja Turtles: The Next Mutation	

== In animation ==
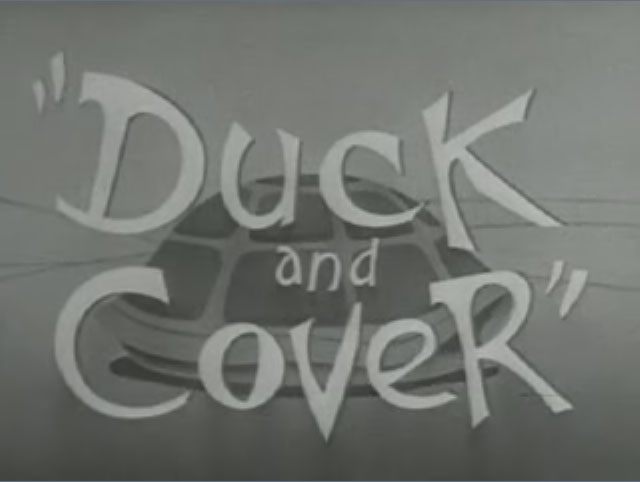
Bert the turtle

Character	Origin	Notes
Aloysius III	Infinity Train	The emperor and unifier of the hard and soft-shelled turtles.
Archie	The Land Before Time IV: Journey Through the Mists	An elderly Archelon who helps Littlefoot.
Baby Shelby	Mickey Mouse Works / House of Mouse	A baby turtle who always annoys and takes advantage of Donald Duck.
Bert the Turtle	Duck and Cover	A civil defense social guiding film shown to school children in the U.S. in the 1950s/60s to tell them what to do in case of the explosion of a nuclear bomb.
Bev Gilturtle	Littlest Pet Shop: A World of Our Own	Bev Gilturtle is one of the main characters who is an energetic box turtle. She tries to entertain the other pets as she can and she loves trying out various kinds of activities.
Burt	Danger Rangers	
Cecil Turtle	Merrie Melodies / Looney Tunes	Bugs Bunny's nemesis and rival.
Coco Jumbo	JoJo's Bizarre Adventure: Golden Wind	A turtle with an ability to create a safe-house if a special key is placed on his back. Later hosts the soul of Jean-Pierre Polnareff.
Dog	Taz-Mania	Taz's pet dog turtle
Filburt	Rocko's Modern Life	
Gallop	Babar and the Adventures of Badou	An elderly turtle who lives in the jungle near Celesteville.
Giant tortoise	Polar Bear Cafe	
Grandpa	Wild Kratts	An old, giant Galápagos tortoise. Martin named him that because of how old he is, estimated at 130 years.
Gramps	The Rescuers	
Hun	Turtles Forever	Gets mutated into a turtle
Ichikawa	Umi Monogatari: Anata ga Ite Kureta Koto	
Kame Jiiya	Puka Puka Juju	
Kongwe	The Lion Guard	An African spurred tortoise.
Lion turtle	Avatar: The Last Airbender	A gigantic turtle-lion hybrid that has the power to grant bending abilities to humans. He grants Aang the power of Energybending before his final confrontation with Fire Lord Ozai.
Lucky	Bionic Max	
Sammy	A Turtle's Tale: Sammy's Adventures	A sea turtle who navigates his 50-year life through the changes caused by global warming.
Shelbow	The Little Mermaid: Ariel's Beginning	A sea turtle who plays the drums (including his shell) in Disney's third The Little Mermaid movie.
Shelly T. Turtle	The Shelly T. Turtle Show	A yellow turtle who is the titular host of the show.
Slash	Teenage Mutant Ninja Turtles	
Snappy Sam	The Comic Strip (TV series)	An anthropomorphic turtle who is the chef and owner of the diner whom "Honeylove" Loretta, of the Street Frogs, works as a waitress and kitchen helper.
Speed	The Swan Princess	
Tamachan	Love Hina	A flying turtle.
Tank	My Little Pony: Friendship is Magic	A tortoise who is Rainbow Dash's pet.
Thelma Tortoise	Manga Aesop's Fables	
Tippi Turtle	Saturday Night Live	An obnoxious practical joker created by Jack Zander
Toby Tortoise	The Tortoise and the Hare	
Toby Turtle	Robin Hood	Skippy's best friend that wears glasses.
Toby the Turtle	64 Zoo Lane	A turtle who is friends with Kevin the Crocodile and Doris the Duck.
Ton-chan	K-On!	A pig-nosed turtle serving as the pet and the unofficial mascot of the Light Music Club.
Toto	Harry & Toto	
Turner	Chucklewood Critters	
Turtle	Bossy Bear	
T.W. Turtle	Cats Don't Dance	A nervous and superstitious turtle who always relies on fortune cookies.
Tooter Turtle	Total Television	
Touché Turtle	Touché Turtle	
Turtle	The Red Turtle	A sea turtle turned into a human
Umigame (Turtle)	Dragon Ball	A sea turtle who is a companion of Master Roshi. He has a son named Umigame Jr. (Turtle, Jr.) English localized name: Turtle
Verne	Over the Hedge	
Crwban	Chwedlau Tinga Tinga	A happy and colourful cartoon turtle on Welsh language channel S4C - voiced by Geraint Iwan.

== In video games ==
Character	Origin	Notes
Bentley	Sly Cooper	The Cooper Gang's technical aid, computer programmer and hacker.
Bowser	Super Mario Bros.	The main villain of the Super Mario series.
Bowser Jr.	Super Mario Sunshine	Bowser's son.
Chargin' Chuck	Super Mario World	Large Koopas that wears Gridiron football uniforms.
Devan Shell	Jazz Jackrabbit	Nemesis of Jazz
Gerson Boom	Undertale	An elderly olive green tortoise-monster who runs a vendor in Waterfall. In Deltarune he is a deceased tortoise who guides the heroes on their adventure.
Ghido	Final Fantasy V	Ancient turtle who guides Bartz and the Warriors of Light on their quest.
The giant turtle	The Legend of Zelda: Majora's Mask	Helps get to Great Bay Temple.
Hammer Bro	Super Mario Bros.	Koopas that throw hammers as an attack. It's variants includes Sledge Bros, Boomerang Bros, Fire Bros, and Ice Bros.
Kamek	Super Mario World 2: Yoshi's Island	Caretaker of Bowser during his childhood. A Magikoopa capable of using various spells.
Koopa Troopa	Super Mario Bros.	Common enemy creatures in the Super Mario series.
Koopalings	Super Mario Bros. 3	Bowser's seven minions. Their individual names are Wendy, Morton, Iggy, Larry, Lemmy, Roy, and Ludwig.
Kooper	Paper Mario	One of Mario's partners. An adventerous Koopa who intends to become an archaeologist.
Koops	Paper Mario: The Thousand-Year Door	One of Mario's partners. Compared to his predecessor Kooper, he is more cowardly.
Lakitu	Super Mario Bros.	One of the enemies in the Super Mario series. Also serves as the referee in spin-offs like Mario Tennis and Mario Kart.
Shen-zin Su	World of Warcraft: Mists of Pandaria	Giant sea turtle and starting zone for the Pandaren race.
Tiptup	Banjo-Kazooie	Appears in Banjo-Kazooie, Banjo-Tooie and Diddy Kong Racing
Tortimer	Animal Crossing	The eccentric tortoise mayor of the town.
Valluta	RuneScape	An ancient tortoise-like creature that is one of the Guardians of Guthix.
Warnado	Skylanders	A spiky shelled Air-elemental tortoise. One of the playable characters in the series.

== As mascots, toys, and others ==
Character	Origin	Notes
Mickael the Turtle	Mickael the Turtle	
Motu	Aquatica	
Peakaboo, Speedy	Beanie Baby	
Testudo	University of Maryland	
Tetter, Totter, and Corky	Suzy's Zoo	
Frumpy	USS Pasadena (SSN-752)	

== In politics ==
- Post turtle
- Ograbme

== See also ==
- Cultural depictions of turtles and tortoises
