= Figurehead =

Person with high office or title but no actual power

In politics, a figurehead, titular ruler or titular head is someone who de jure (in name or by law) appears to hold an important and often supremely powerful title or office, yet de facto (in reality) exercises little to no actual power. In most parliamentary democracies nowadays, the head of state has either evolved into, or was created as, a position of titular leadership. In the former case, the leader may often have significant powers listed within the state's constitution but is no longer able to exercise them because of historical changes within that country. In the latter case, it is often made clear within the document that the leader is intended to be powerless. Heads of state who inhabit positions of titular leadership are usually regarded as symbols of the people they "lead."

== Etymology ==
The metaphor derives from the carved figurehead at the prow of a sailing ship.

'Titular' is formed from a combination of the Latin titulus (title) and the English suffix -ar, which means "of or belonging to."

== Examples ==
Heads of state in most constitutional monarchies and parliamentary republics are often considered to be figureheads. Commonly cited ones include the monarch of the United Kingdom, who is also head of state of the other Commonwealth realms and head of the Commonwealth, but has no power over the nations in which the sovereign is not head of government and does not exercise power in the realms on their own initiative.

In one-party communist states, the role of the head of state is sometimes a de jure figurehead with few legally defined powers, although in many cases the position has simultaneously been mostly held by the party general secretary, who is the de facto leader. The President of China alone is largely ceremonial with limited power, when not simultaneously holding the General Secretary of the Chinese Communist Party position. During Deng Xiaoping's leadership, the presidency of the People's Republic of China was held by two figureheads, Li Xiannian and Yang Shangkun. Since 1993, the position has also been held by the CCP General Secretary. Hua Guofeng, despite holding the posts of Premier of the People's Republic, Chairman of the Communist Party, and Supreme Commander of the Military, was widely regarded as a figurehead after 1978 when he was politically outmaneuvered by Deng Xiaoping.

Other examples include:

- Napoleon II was briefly titular Emperor of the French after his father's second abdication in 1815.
- Emperor Shōwa of Japan remained as a titular ruler after the Japanese surrender in World War II.
- The presidents of both Israel and Ireland have largely ceremonial duties and are regarded as titular leaders.

== See also ==
- Puppet ruler
- Post turtle
