= Mickael Turtle =

Mickael Turtle (a.k.a. Mickael the Turtle) from New Caledonia (France) is a fictional turtle who in 2006 reached No. 5 on the French music charts with a reworking of the Ghostbusters theme. He has also made a teaser video (Wacky Animals).

== Discography ==
=== Singles ===
List of singles, with selected chart positions
Title	Year	Peak chart positions	
Title	Year	FRA	AUS
"Ghostbusters"	2006	5	58
"Super Freak"	2006	—	—

=== Appearances ===
- 2006: Wacky Animals (Universal, 0602498360262), published in Ukraine
