= Ang ku kueh =

Chinese dumpling

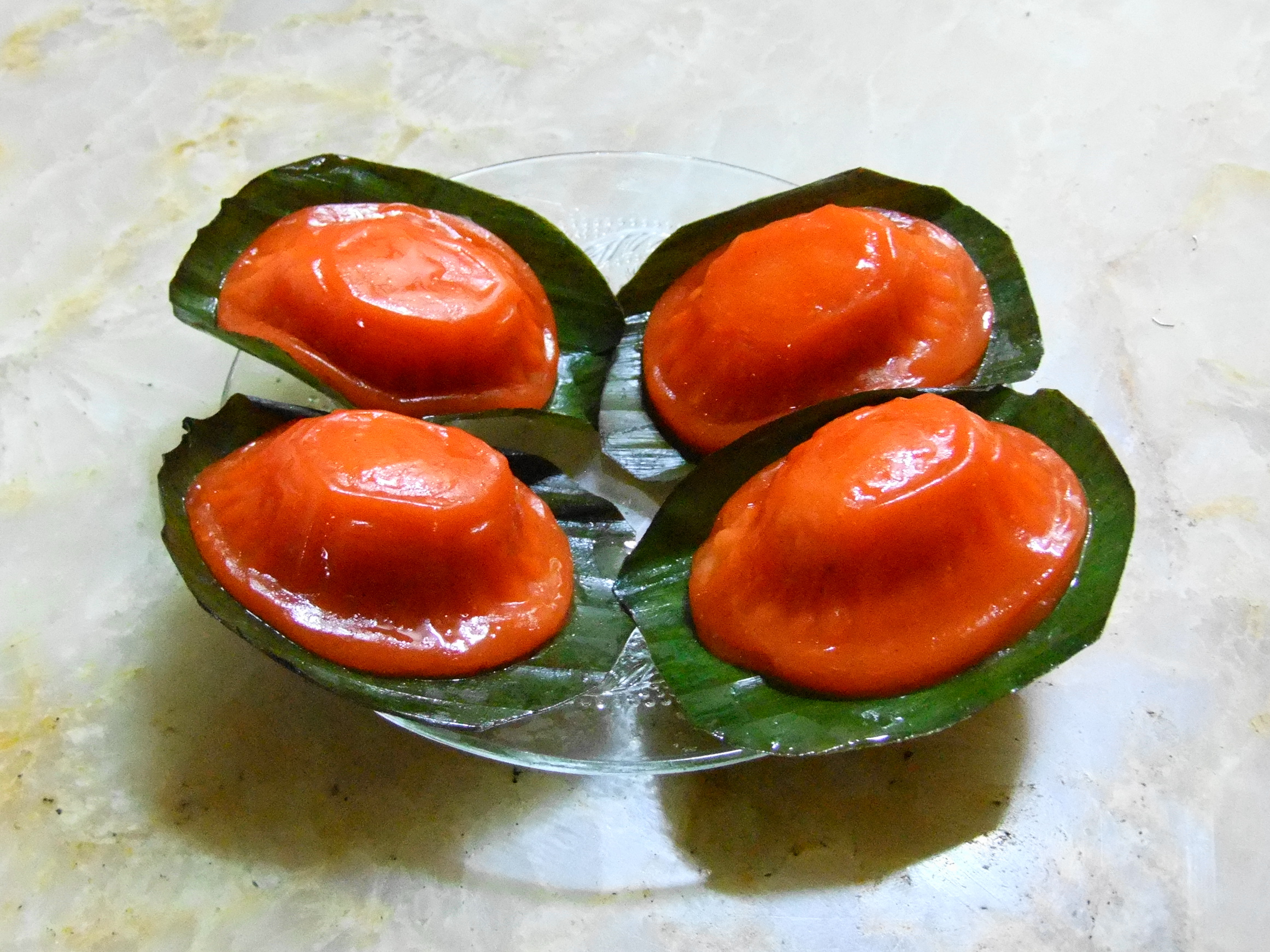
- Alternative names: kue ku, red tortoise cake
- Type: Pastry
- Course: Snack
- Place of origin: China
- Region or state: China and Southeast Asia
- Main ingredients: Glutinous rice flour, mung bean, peanut

Ang ku kueh, (Note: Chinese: 紅龜粿; Pe̍h-ōe-jī: âng-ku-kóe; Tâi-lô: âng-ku-kué; Teochew Peng'im: ang⁵ gu¹ guê²) also known as red tortoise cake, is a small round or oval-shaped sweet Chinese dumpling with soft, sticky glutinous rice flour skin wrapped around a sweet central filling. As suggested by the name, a red tortoise cake is molded to resemble a tortoise and is red in color. It is typically presented on a piece of banana leaf, and has a sticky, chewy texture when eaten. Red tortoise cakes are shaped like tortoise shells because the Chinese traditionally believed that eating tortoises would bring longevity, good fortune and prosperity. Considered to be auspicious items, these sweet pastries are especially prepared during important festivals such as Chinese New Year as offerings to the Chinese deities.

Red tortoise cakes are also prepared for occasions that are culturally important to the Chinese such as a newborn baby's first month or birthdays of the elderly. Eating red tortoise cakes during these times is meant to represent blessings for the child and longevity for the elderly. Aside from China, in modern times, red tortoise cakes continue to be important food items during Chinese festivals in many countries with significant Sinophone communities especially in Southeast Asia. However, eating red tortoise cakes in these countries is no longer restricted to special occasions for red tortoise cakes are also commercially available in many pastry shops and bakeries.

There are two main components in red tortoise cakes: skin and filling. The skin is made mostly from glutinous rice flour and sweet potato whereas the fillings are made from precooked ingredients such as mung bean or ground peanuts and sugar. After kneading and molding the ingredients together, the red tortoise cakes are steamed on a piece of banana leaf. In Singapore, bakeries sell red tortoise cakes in flavors including jelly and red bean. In Vietnam, they are called bánh quy, and are commonly sold in Chinese markets, especially in Ho Chi Minh City (Cho Lon area). The word quy (龜) is the Sino-Vietnamese word for "tortoise."

== Importance in Chinese culture ==
In Chinese culture, the color red is traditionally used as a symbol of joy and happiness whereas the tortoise symbolizes longevity, power and tenacity. As such, red tortoise cakes are of high cultural significance and value among Chinese people. They are typically associated with auspicious occasions and are especially prepared during birthdays and religious festivals to symbolize blessings and good fortune.

=== Chinese New Year ===
Chinese New Year is the most important festival in Chinese culture as it provides an opportunity for people to reconcile and welcome the new year in hopes of peace, prosperity, and good fortune. Sweets such as rice cakes and red tortoise cakes are offered to deities on ritual altars. These ritual offerings are made in the hope that the sweetness from these cakes will leave a sweet taste in the mouths of the deities and they will bless the people with a prosperous year.

=== Jade Emperor's Birthday ===
The Jade Emperor is one of the most important gods in Chinese folklore. He is believed to be the ruler of heaven and his birthday falls on the ninth day of the first lunar month. To celebrate his birthday, the Chinese people will conduct prayers in his name and prepare food within Chinese temples or Chinese households as ritual offerings. In Chinese culture, red tortoise cakes are considered must-haves among food items offered to the Jade Emperor on altar tables.

Because the number 6 is considered an auspicious number in Chinese culture, red tortoise cakes are placed on the altar table in multiples of six such as 12, 24 or 36 in the hope that he will bless the people with good fortune and prosperity.

=== Qing Ming Festival ===
Qing Ming Festival is the time for the Chinese to visit the burial grounds of their ancestors to pay their respects. Prayers are conducted to honor the ancestors and food items such as red tortoise cakes are prepared as offerings. However, there is some difference in the red tortoise cakes that are prepared for this occasion. Apart from the usual red tortoise cakes that are prepared in the color red, there are separate red tortoise cakes that are prepared in the colors green or white. The reason for these differences in color between red tortoise cakes is that these colors are of cultural significance to the Chinese people. The color red is representative of the virtuous life led by the ancestors whereas the colors green and white embody the descendants' grief and their hope that their ancestors are coping well in the afterlife.

=== Qi Xi Festival ===
Qi Xi Festival falls on the seventh day of the seventh lunar month on the Chinese calendar. Also known as the Chinese Valentine's Day, the Qi Xi Festival is traditionally a time for young maidens to make wishes for a good husband. When a teenage girl reaches her sixteenth birthday, red tortoise cakes are prepared within the respective households and then handed out to close friends and neighbors. The symbolic act of handing out red tortoise cakes on this day signifies that one's daughter has reached maturity and is of a marriageable age. However, this practice is seldom carried out these days due to a change in cultural thoughts and beliefs among modern Chinese.

=== Birthdays ===
In Chinese culture, birthdays are of greater significance after one reaches the age of 60. Red tortoise cakes are prepared especially for such occasions when celebrating the birthdays of the elders in the family. The number of red tortoise cakes that are prepared corresponds to the age of the elder who is celebrating his or her birthday by an additional twelve. For example, if an elder is celebrating his 65th birthday, there will be 77 red tortoise cakes prepared to celebrate his or her birthday. The cultural significance of preparing these red tortoise cakes is to count one's blessings for having lived thus far and it is hoped that the additional 12 red tortoise cakes would increase one's lifespan, bringing longevity and good fortune in the process.

=== Newborn's first month ===
According to Chinese custom, when a baby turns one month old, a ceremony is held to celebrate his/her first month of life (the Chinese term translates as "full moon"). Red tortoise cakes are traditionally distributed to friends and relatives during this time to symbolize luck, blessings and long life for the child.

In Hokkien tradition, the design on top of the "ang ku kueh" will signify the sex of the child. A turtle and two marbles is the sign for a boy while a girl is represented by two peaches. Nowadays, to simplify things, a pointed "ang ku kueh" signifies a boy while a 'flat' one a girl. These tortoise cakes are sometimes made larger than usual in the hope that the child will grow up big and healthy.

== Availability ==
Traditionally prepared during significant occasions such as festivals or birthdays, red tortoise cakes have become popular among many people who favor them as a delicious snack. Though many Chinese families these days continue to prepare red tortoise cakes within the household for special occasions, red tortoise cakes are available for sale all year in many bakeries and Chinese pastry shops. Because preparing red tortoise cakes is a time-consuming process, store-bought versions are also popular in China and across Southeast Asia. Pastry chefs continue to introduce innovative interpretations of this traditional pastry into the market every year, appealing to consumers who enjoy the novelty of tasting these red tortoise cakes in assorted flavors.

== Preparation ==
The skin of the red tortoise cake is made from glutinous rice flour dough, mashed sweet potato, water, food coloring, sugar, oil and wheat starch. Traditionally, fillings for red tortoise cakes are made with the following ingredients: mung bean paste or ground peanuts, sugar and oil. The fillings are then placed within the dough and the tortoise shell design imprinted on the skin's surface using molds before the red tortoise cakes are steamed over a piece of banana leaf. The banana leaves enable the steam to penetrate the red tortoise cake that is resting on top and exudes a sweet fragrance when steamed. A good red tortoise cake is one where the skin does not stick to the teeth and exudes a sweet fragrance coupled with a soft chewy texture.

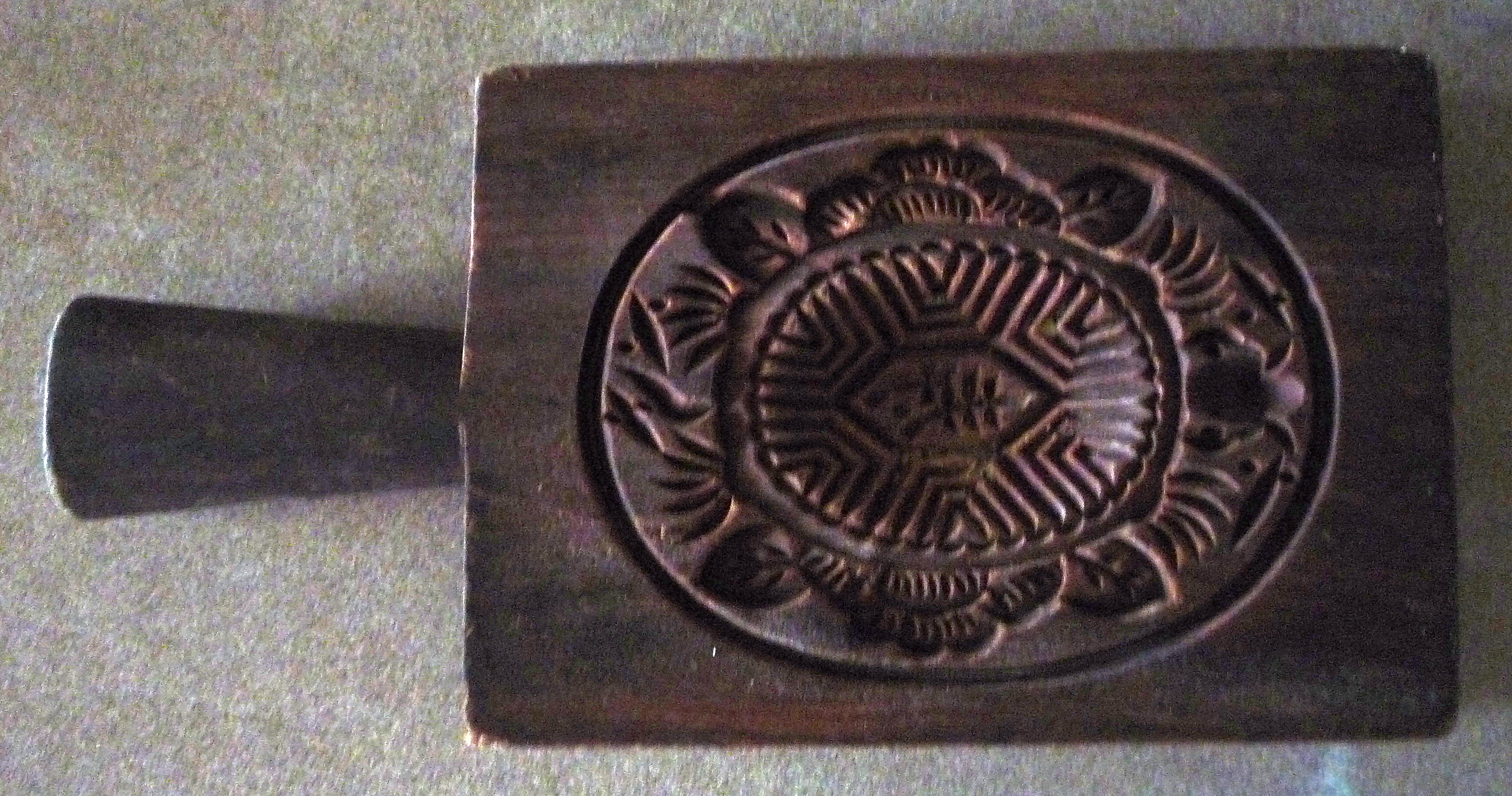
Mold with tortoise shell design

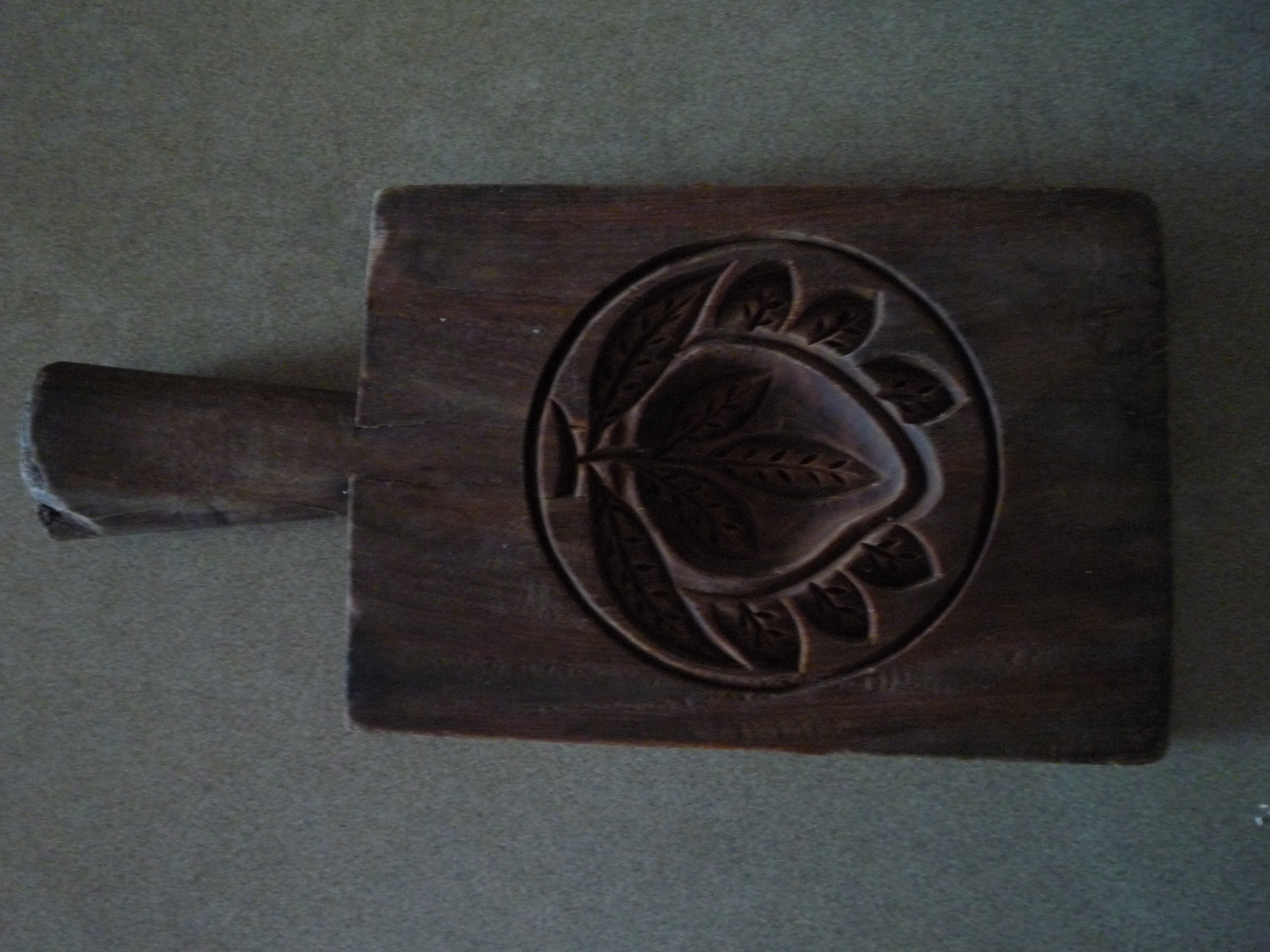
Mold with floral design

Wooden red tortoise cake molds

Red tortoise cakes are traditionally made by:

- Mixing and kneading the ingredients for the skin to form a dough
- Cooking the ingredients used for the filling such as mung bean and peanut
- Mashing the cooked ingredients together with sugar and oil to form a sweet paste
- Flattening the dough into smaller rounded shapes
- Placing a portion of the sweetened paste on the dough as filling before rolling the dough into a ball
- Pressing the ball into a mold to create the iconic "tortoise shell" design
- Steaming it over boiling water for 10 minutes on a piece of banana leaf
- Brushing the cooked red tortoise cakes with oil to give the cakes a glossy shine on the surface

=== Red tortoise cake mold ===
Red tortoise cake molds are an important tool when making red tortoise cakes. Apart from molding the red tortoise cakes into perfectly round or oval shapes, these molds are also used to imprint patterns onto the surfaces of the red tortoise cakes. Usually carved out of wood or molded from plastics, there are many different types of red tortoise cake molds available on the market. There are also red tortoise molds that create floral patterns instead of the tortoise shell pattern seen on traditional red tortoise cakes. These molds are used to enhance the aesthetic value of red tortoise cakes and there is no cultural significance attached to the differing designs on these molds.

== Varieties ==
=== Jelly red tortoise cake ===
Though it looks exactly like the traditional red tortoise cake physically, jelly red tortoise cake is significantly different from its traditional counterpart. Instead of a skin that is made from glutinous rice flour, jelly red tortoise cakes have skins that are made of sweetened gelatin. The gelatin mixture along with fillings such as cream or custard are poured into plastic molds and then refrigerated to enable the gelatin mixture to set and harden. These jelly red tortoise cakes are served chilled and presented on green plastic strips instead of traditional banana leaves. They are especially popular among children who view these cakes as a delicious treat and enjoy the jelly red tortoise cakes for its refreshing sweetness.

== See also ==
- Kue
- Kuih
- List of steamed foods
- Mochi
- Peranakan cuisine
- Kutsinta
- Masi
