= Cultural depictions of turtles =

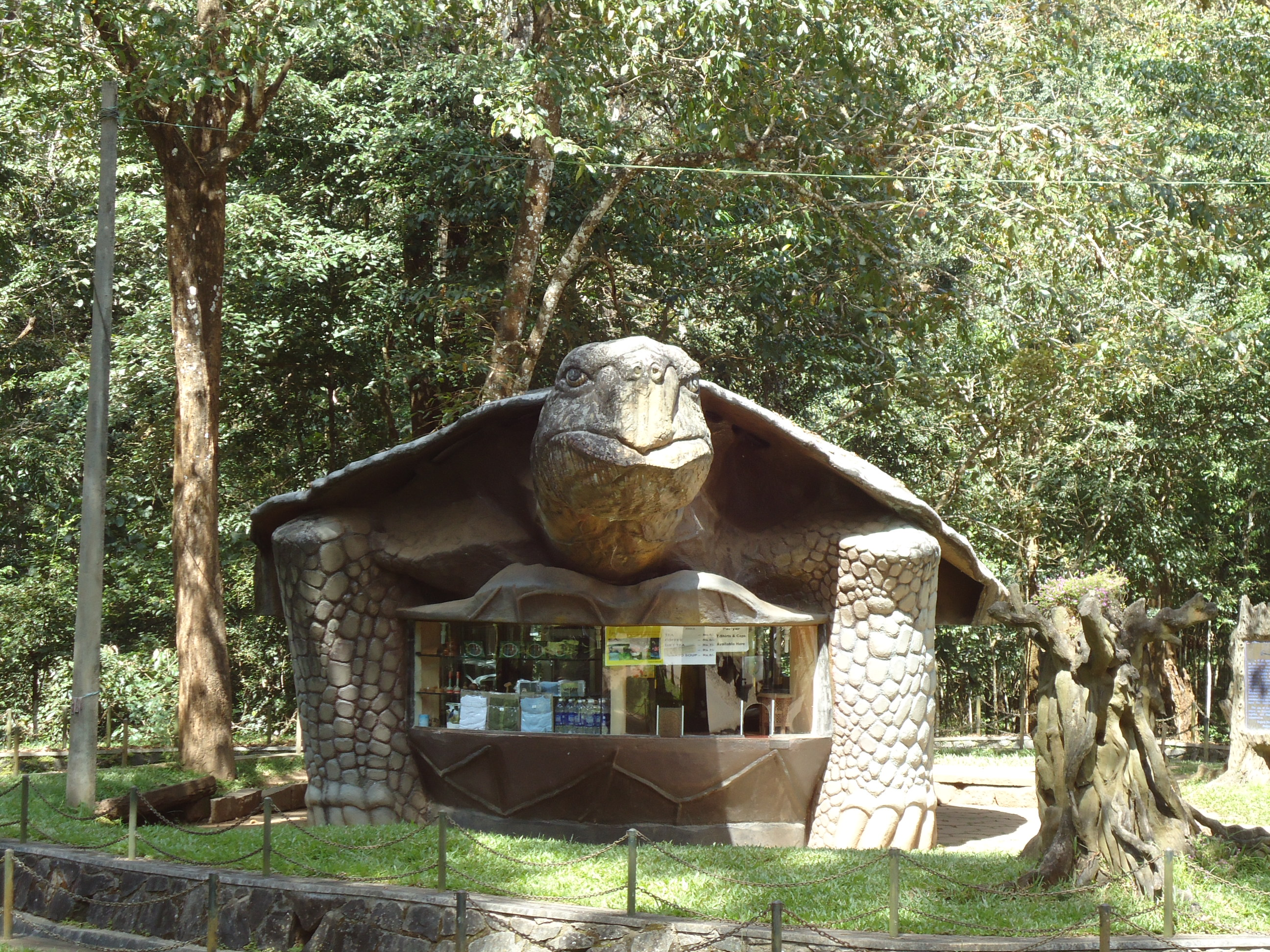
Eco shop

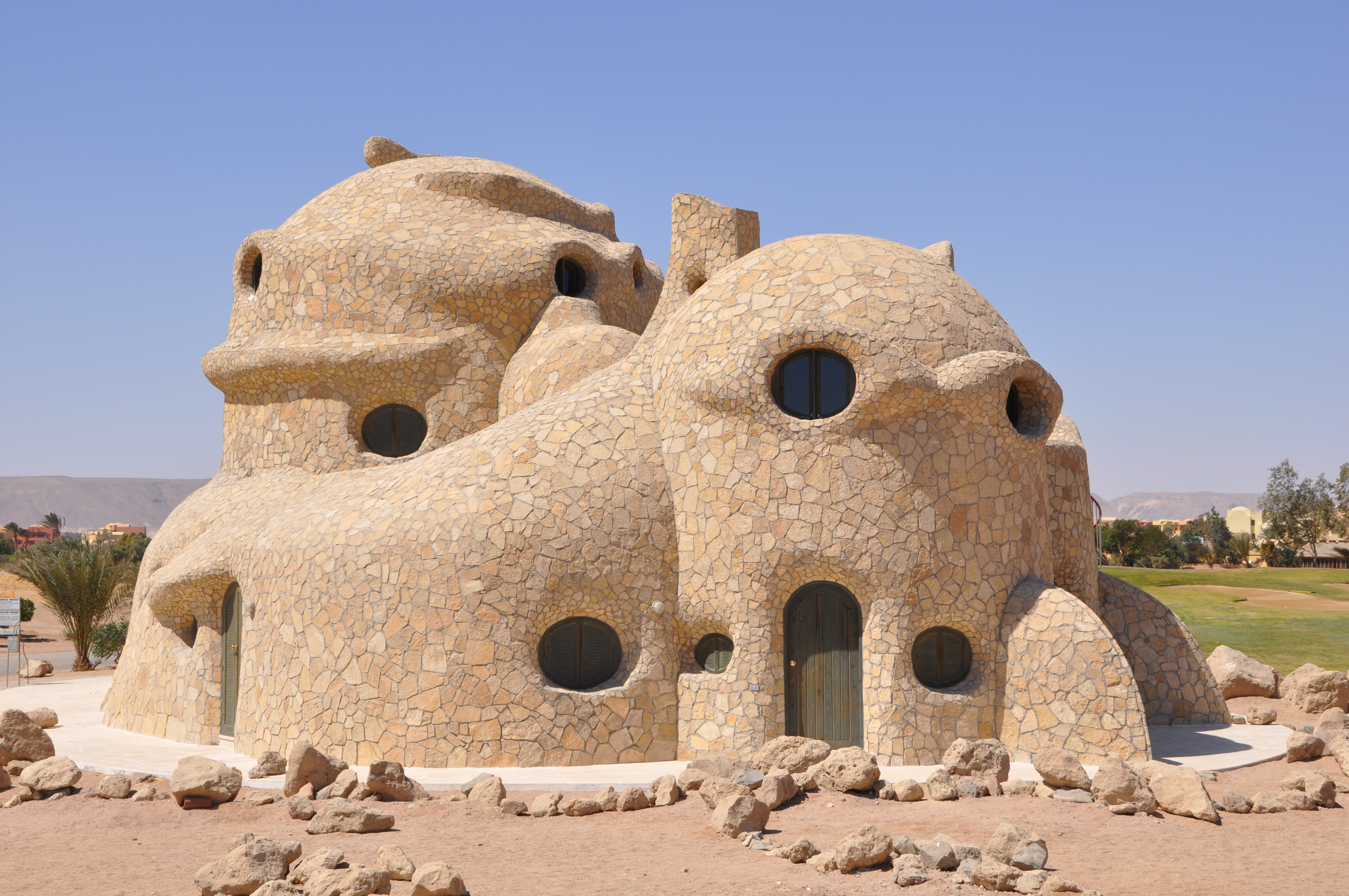
The Turtle House by the German architect and designer Kurt Völtzke (Atelier Color, Chemnitz) at El Gouna (Red Sea, Egypt)

Turtles are frequently depicted in popular culture as easygoing, patient, and wise creatures. Due to their long lifespan, slow movement, sturdiness, and wrinkled appearance, they are an emblem of longevity and stability in many cultures around the world. Turtles are regularly incorporated into human culture, with painters, photographers, poets, songwriters, and sculptors using them as subjects. They have an important role in mythologies around the world, and are often implicated in creation myths regarding the origin of the Earth. Sea turtles are a charismatic megafauna and are used as symbols of the marine environment and environmentalism.

As a result of its role as a slow, peaceful creature in culture, the turtle can be misconceived as a sedentary animal; however, many types of turtle, especially sea turtles, frequently migrate over large distances in oceans.

== In mythology, legends, and folklore ==
The turtle has a prominent position as a symbol of important concepts in religion, mythology, and folklore from around the world, including steadfastness and tranquility. A tortoise's longevity is suggested by its long lifespan and its shell, which to some symbolizes protection from any foe. In the cosmological myths of several cultures a World Turtle carries the world upon its back or supports the heavens. The myth of a World Tortoise, along with that of a world-bearing elephant, was discussed comparatively by Edward Burnett Tylor (1878:341).

Around the world the tortoise and/or turtle can be seen as a symbol of wisdom and knowledge, and is able to defend itself on its own. It can be regarded as personifying water, the moon, the Earth, time, immortality, and fertility.

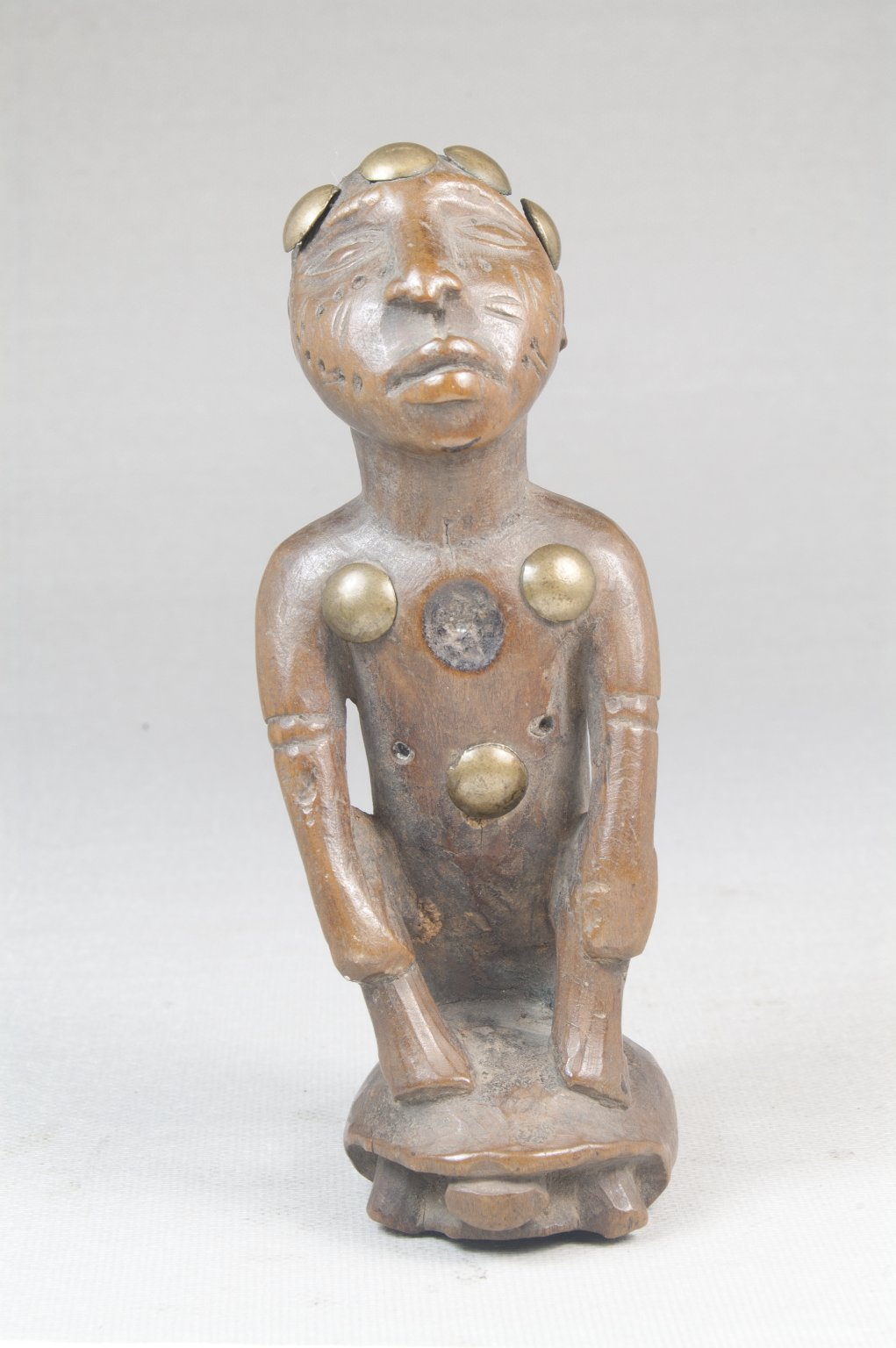
Human figure squatting on a turtle, Africa, 19th century

A rock engraved as a turtle, dated to 35,000 years BCE, has been found in the deepest section of Manot Cave in Galilee, Israel. Turtles appear in rock art in many places around the world, including polychrome paintings at Dhambalin in Somaliland, dated to ca 5000-3000 BCE; and petroglyphs at such places as Ute Tribal Park, Mancos Canyon, Colorado (ca 1000 years old), Easter Island or Rapa Nui and Murujuga or the Burrup Peninsula in Western Australia.

The psychoanalyst Carl Gustav Jung interpreted the turtle as the primordial chaos, the alchemical massa confusa, noting that the Hindi Trimurti has a turtle at the bottom, from which everything else grows through transformation.

=== Africa ===
In tales told by a number of African ethnic groups, the tortoise is the cleverest animal. Ijapa or Alabahun the tortoise is a trickster, accomplishing heroic deeds or getting into trouble, in a cycle of tales told by the Yoruba of Nigeria and Benin. As "Mbe Nwa Aniga" ("Tortoise son of Aniga") in the folklore of the Igbo people of Nigeria, he is depicted as a slow but smart manipulator able to figure a way out of every dicey situation.

=== Ancient Egypt ===
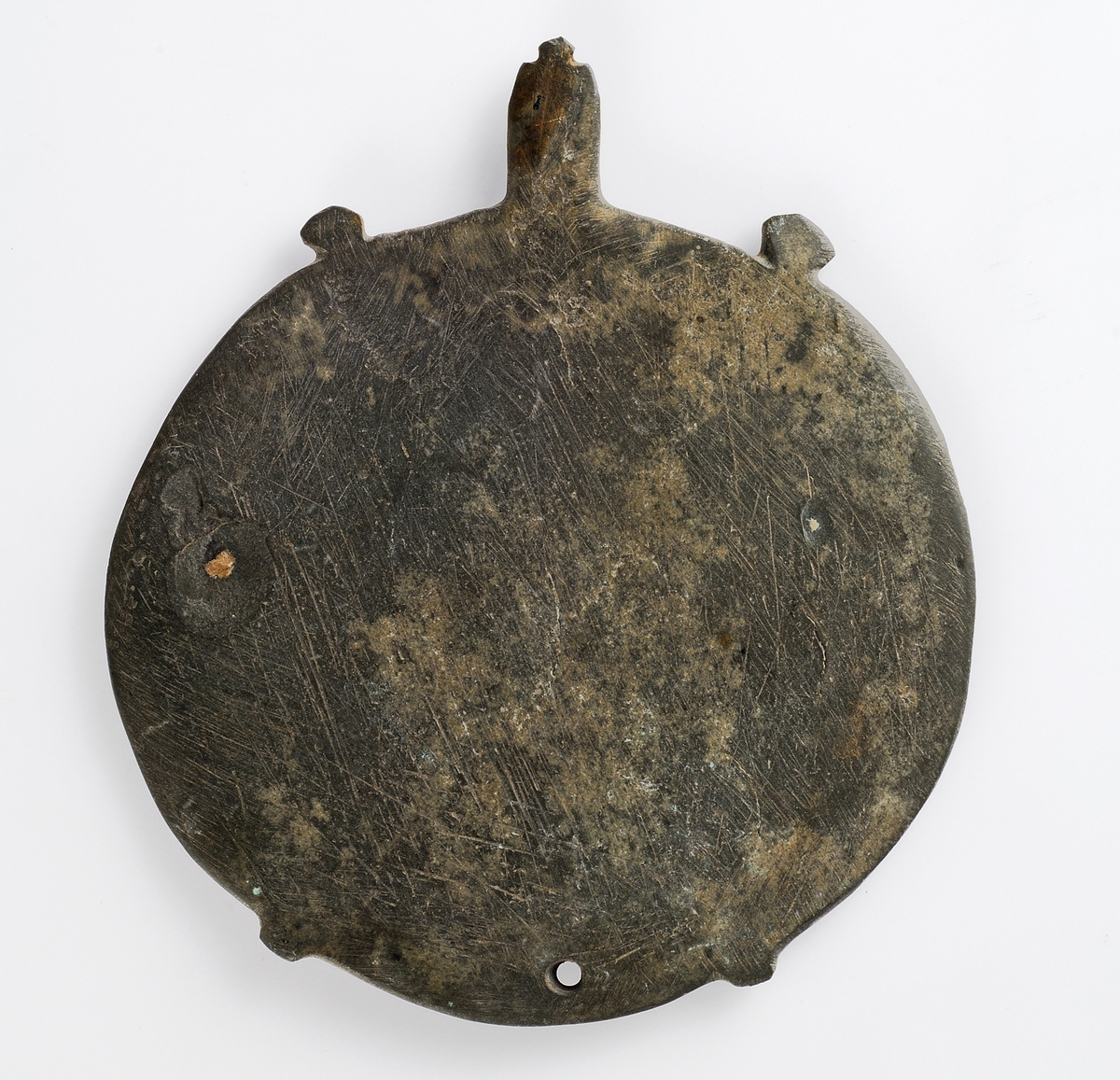
A zoomorphic palette in the form of a Nile soft-shell turtle. 4th millennium BC

The turtle Shetyw (also Shetw, Sheta, or Shtyw) was common in Ancient Egyptian Art (especially Predynastic and Old Kingdom art). Turtle fossils are the most common reptiles found in the Fayoum, including Gigantochersina ammon, a tortoise as large as those living on the Galapagos Islands today.

Predynastic slate palettes represent freshwater (soft carapace, Trionyx triunguis) turtles, as does the hieroglyph for "turtle", 𓆉, in which the animal is always represented from above. Zoomorphic palettes were commonly made in the shapes of turtles. A stone vase in the form of a turtle was found in Naqada.

The earliest representations of the Nile turtle are from pre-dynastic times; they had magical significance and were meant to ward off evil. Amulets and objects depicting the turtles represent them as a force to defend health and life. Many relics from the Middle Kingdom such as magical knives depicted turtles and were inscribed to protect the women and children of the house.

Among Ptah's many creatures, Shetyw was neither especially remarkable nor esteemed. Though excluded from lists of animal offerings to the deities, there are nevertheless great quantities of turtle bones at the great ceremonial complex at Heirakonpolis in Upper Egypt. Sacrifices of turtles may have served some ritual or liturgical purpose within the ancient Egyptian ceremonial system.

As an aquatic animal, the turtle was associated with the Underworld. The turtle was associated with Set, and so with the enemies of Ra who tried to stop the solar barque as it traveled through the underworld. Since the XIXth Dynasty, and particularly in the Late and Greco-Roman periods, turtles were ritually speared by kings and nobles as evil creatures.

The famous Hunters Palette shows most of the hunters carrying a kind of shield interpreted as a turtle-carapace shield. In an Early Dynastic tomb at Helwan a man was buried beneath the carapace of a tortoise who had lost his feet in an accident. The carapace may symbolize the "way in which the owner used to move slowly like a tortoise," or sitting in the carapace may have been a very useful way for the owner to move around.

The Medical Ebers Papyrus cites the use of turtle carapaces and organs in some formulas, including one formula for the removal of hair. An ointment made from the brain of a turtle was the treatment for squinting. Parts of turtles were used to grind eye paint, which was applied both as a cosmetic and to protect eyes from infection and over-exposure to sun, dust, wind, and insects.

The flesh of Trionyx was eaten from Predynastic times to as late as the Old Kingdom; later the flesh of turtles began to be considered an "abomination of Ra" and the animals were thought of as evil. Turtle carapaces and scutes from Red Sea turtles (Eretmochelys imbricata) were used in rings, bracelets, dishes, bowls, knife hilts, amulets, and combs. Carapaces from Kleinmann's tortoise were used as sounding boards for lutes, harps and mandolins. Turtle shells were also used to make norvas, an instrument resembling a banjo.

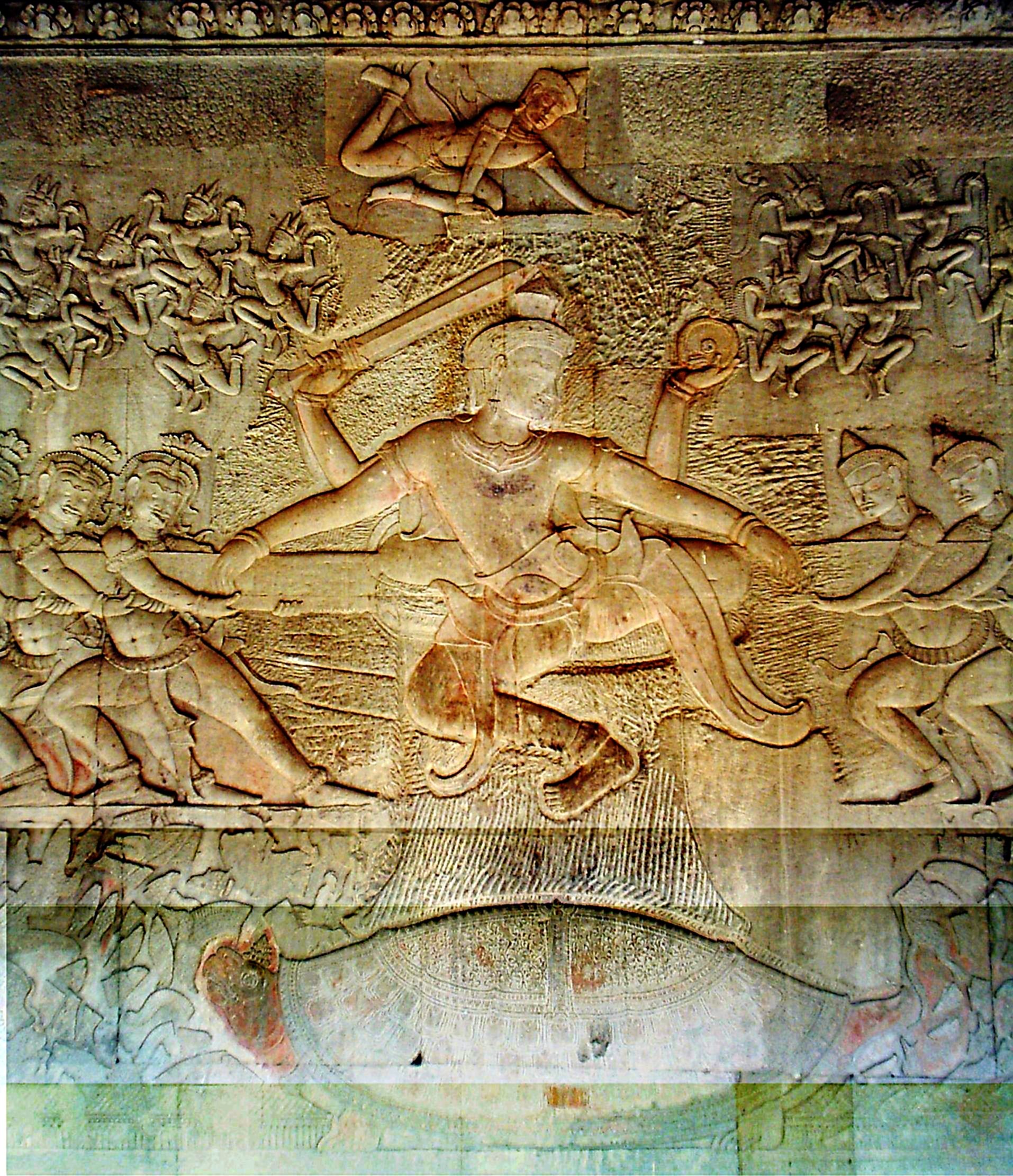
A bas-relief from Angkor Wat, Cambodia, shows Samudra manthan-Vishnu in the center and his turtle Avatar Kurma below

While eaten in Predynastic, Archaic, and Old Kingdom periods, turtles were used only for medicinal purposes after the Old Kingdom. Carapaces were used well into the New Kingdom. In reliefs and paintings of the Old, Middle, and Early New Kingdoms, the turtle is depicted rarely, and as an innocuous reptile. After Dynasty XIX, the turtle is usually depicted as a malignant creature associated with Apophis and subject to ritual extermination. In Predynastic and Archaic times, objects of daily use, such as cosmetic palettes, dishes, and vessels, were made in the shapes of turtles, while after the Old and Middle Kingdoms representations of turtles are more often found on amuletic objects and furniture. After the Middle Kingdom, the turtle's shape is rarely associated with any object which would come into close contact with a person, reflecting the increasing explicit hostility shown to turtles in scenes and texts.

=== Ancient Mesopotamia ===
In ancient Mesopotamia, the turtle was associated with the god Enki and was used on kudurrus as one of Enki's symbols. In the myth of Ninurta and the Turtle, Enki thwarts an attempt by the god Ninurta to seize absolute power by creating a giant turtle and releasing it behind Ninurta, so it bites the hero's ankle. As they struggle, the turtle digs a pit with its claws, which both of them fall into. Enki gloats over Ninurta's defeat. The heron and the turtle is an ancient Sumerian story that has survived to this day.

=== Ancient Greece and Rome ===
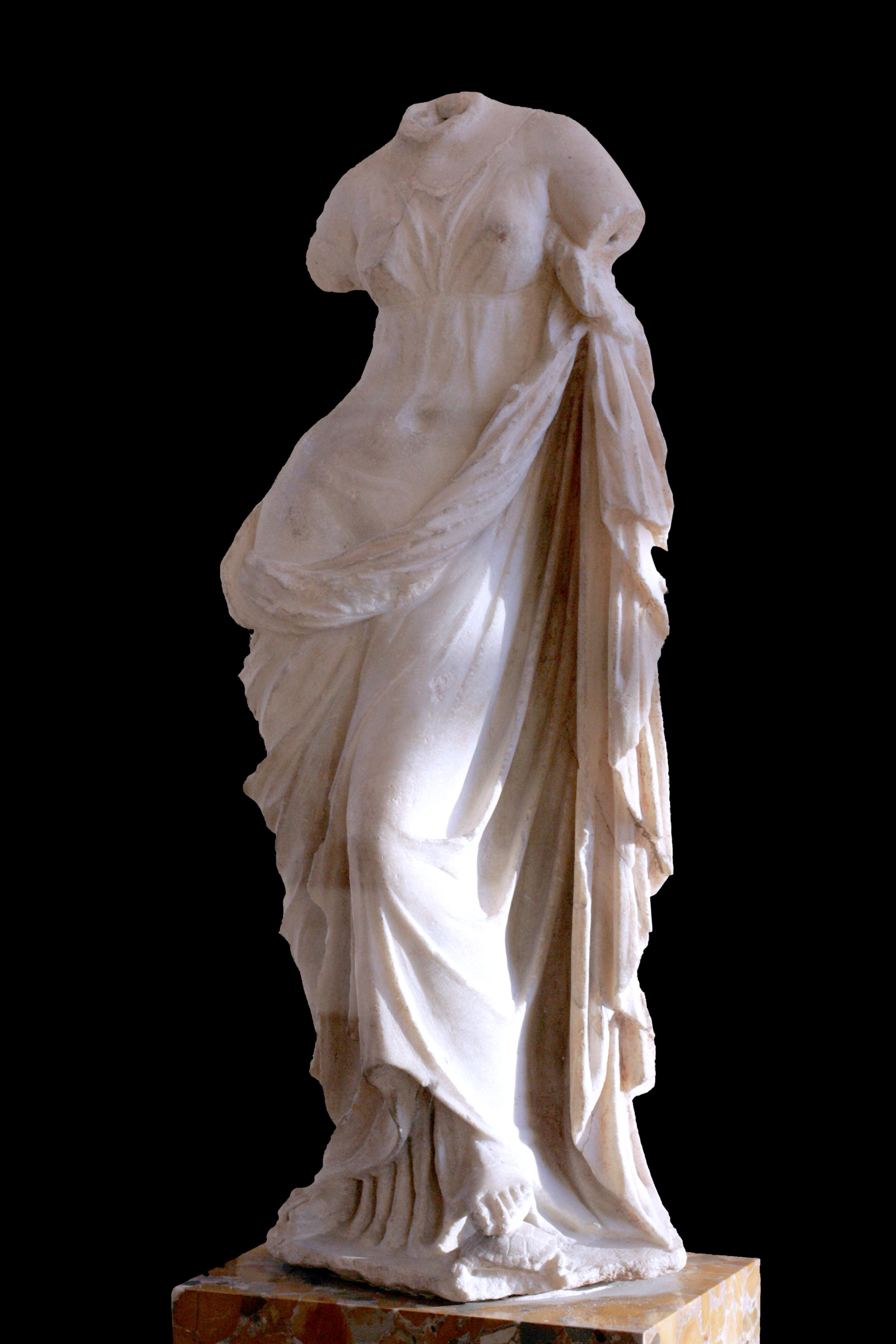
Aphrodite Ourania, draped rather than nude, and with her foot resting on a tortoise (Musée du Louvre).

One of Aesop's fables is The Tortoise and the Hare.

The tortoise was the symbol of the ancient Greek city of Aegina, on the island by the same name: the seal and coins of the city shows images of tortoises. The word Chelonian comes from the Greek Chelone, a tortoise god. The tortoise was a fertility symbol in Greek and Roman times, and an attribute of Aphrodite/Venus. Aphrodite Ourania, is draped rather than nude Aphrodite with her foot resting on a tortoise at Musée du Louvre.

The playwright Aeschylus was said to have been killed by a tortoise dropped by a bird.

A massive sea turtle is used by the bandit Sciron to dispose of his victims after he pushes them into the sea. Sciron is defeated by Theseus pushing him into the sea before being eaten by the turtle.

In Hermes' origin story, the Homeric Hymn to Hermes, Hermes invented the Lyre by killing a turtle or a tortoises and using its shell.

In the account of Zeus and Hera's wedding, the nymph Chelone, was disinclined to leave her house to attend, so Zeus, or Hermes on Zeus' behalf, threw Chelone and her house, which stood on the bank of a river, into the water, and transformed her into a lazy tortoise, who had henceforth to carry her house on her back, to punish her.

=== Asia ===
==== Malaysia ====
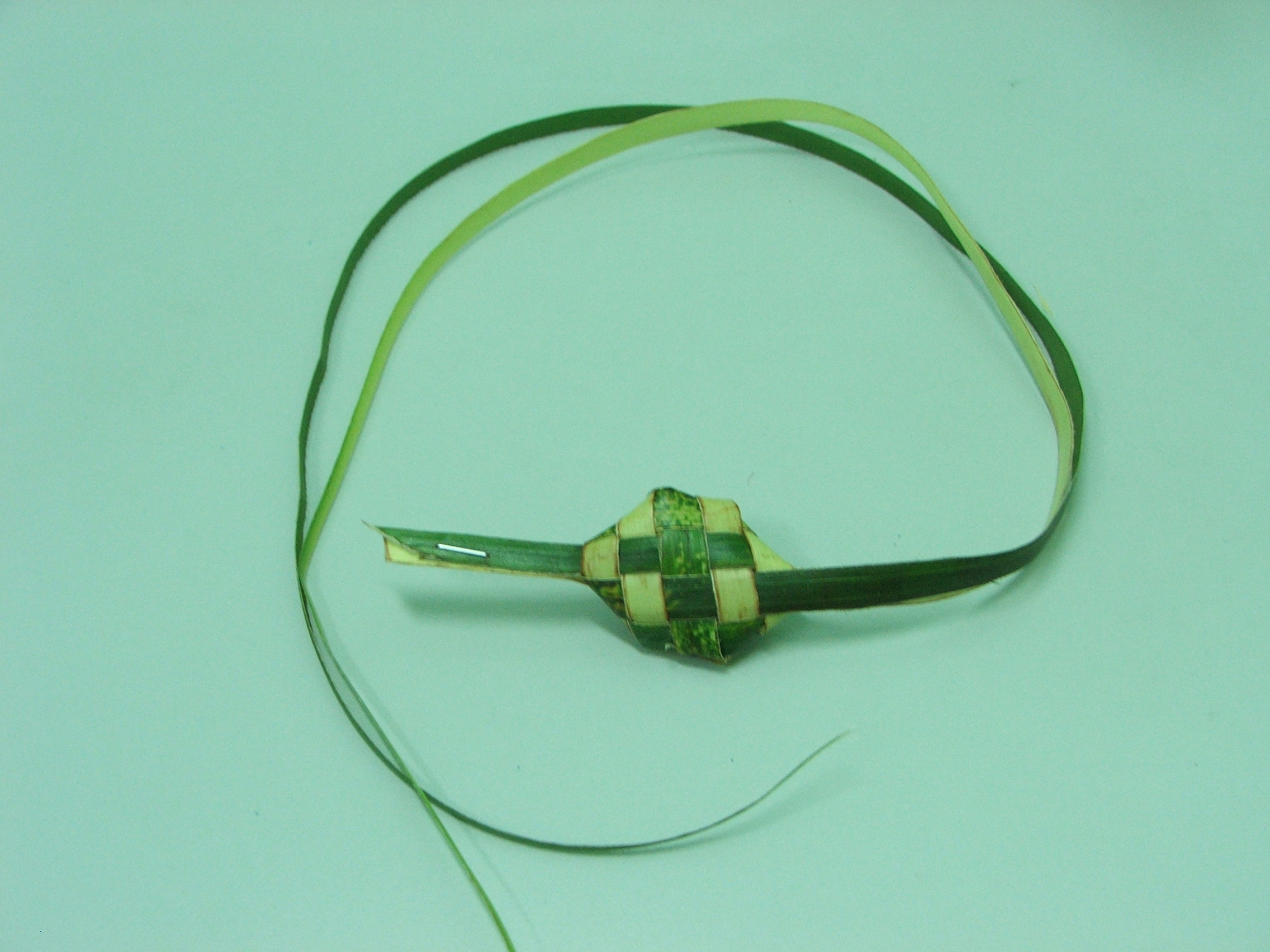
Ketupat penyu, Malaysia

Ketupat penyu is made from a coconut leaf to appear like a turtle. It is used in a ritual to banish the ghosts in Malay traditional medicine.

==== China ====
For the Chinese, the tortoise is sacred and symbolizes longevity, power, and tenacity. It is said that the tortoise helped Pangu (also known as P'an Ku) create the world: the creator goddess Nuwa or Nugua cuts the legs off a sea turtle and uses them to prop up the sky after Gong Gong destroys the mountain that had supported the sky. The flat plastron and domed carapace of a turtle parallel the ancient Chinese idea of a flat earth and domed sky. For the Chinese as well as the Indians, the tortoise symbolizes the universe. Quoting Pen T'sao, "the upper dome-shaped part of its back has various signs, which correspond with the constellations on the sky, and this is Yan; the lower part has many lines, which relate to the earth and is the Yin.

The tortoise is one of the "Four Fabulous Animals", the most prominent beasts of China. These animals govern the four points of the compass, with the Black Tortoise the ruler of the north, symbolizing endurance, strength, and longevity. The tortoise and the tiger are the only real animals of the four, although the tortoise is depicted with supernatural features such as dragon ears, flaming tentacles at its shoulders and hips, and a long hairy tail representing seaweed and the growth of plant parasites found on older tortoise shells that flow behind the tortoise as it swims. The Chinese believe that tortoises come out in the spring when they change their shells, and hibernate during the winter, which is the reason for their long life.

The Chinese Imperial Army carried flags with images of dragons and tortoises as symbols of unparalleled power and inaccessibility, as these animals fought with each other but both remained alive. The dragon cannot break the tortoise and the latter cannot reach the dragon.

In Tibet, the tortoise is a symbol of creativity.

The tortoise is of the feng shui water element with the tiger, phoenix, and dragon representing the other three elements. According to the principles of feng shui the rear of the home is represented by the Black Tortoise, which signifies support for home, family life, and personal relationships. A tortoise at the back door of a house or in the backyard by a pond is said to attract good fortune and many blessings. Three tortoises stacked on top of each other represent a mother and her babies. In Daoist art, the tortoise is an emblem of the triad of earth-humankind-heaven.

The tortoise is a symbol of longevity. Due to its longevity, a symbol of a turtle was often used during burials. A burial mound might be shaped like a turtle, and even called a "grave turtle." A carved turtle, known as bixi was used as a plinth for memorial tablets of high-ranking officials during the Sui dynasty (581-618 CE) and the Ming periods (1368-1644 CE). Enormous turtles supported the memorial tablets of Chinese emperors and support the Kangxi Emperor's stele near Marco Polo Bridge in Beijing, China. Tortoise shells were used for witchcraft and future forecasting. There are innumerable tales on the longevity of the tortoises and their ability to transform into other forms.

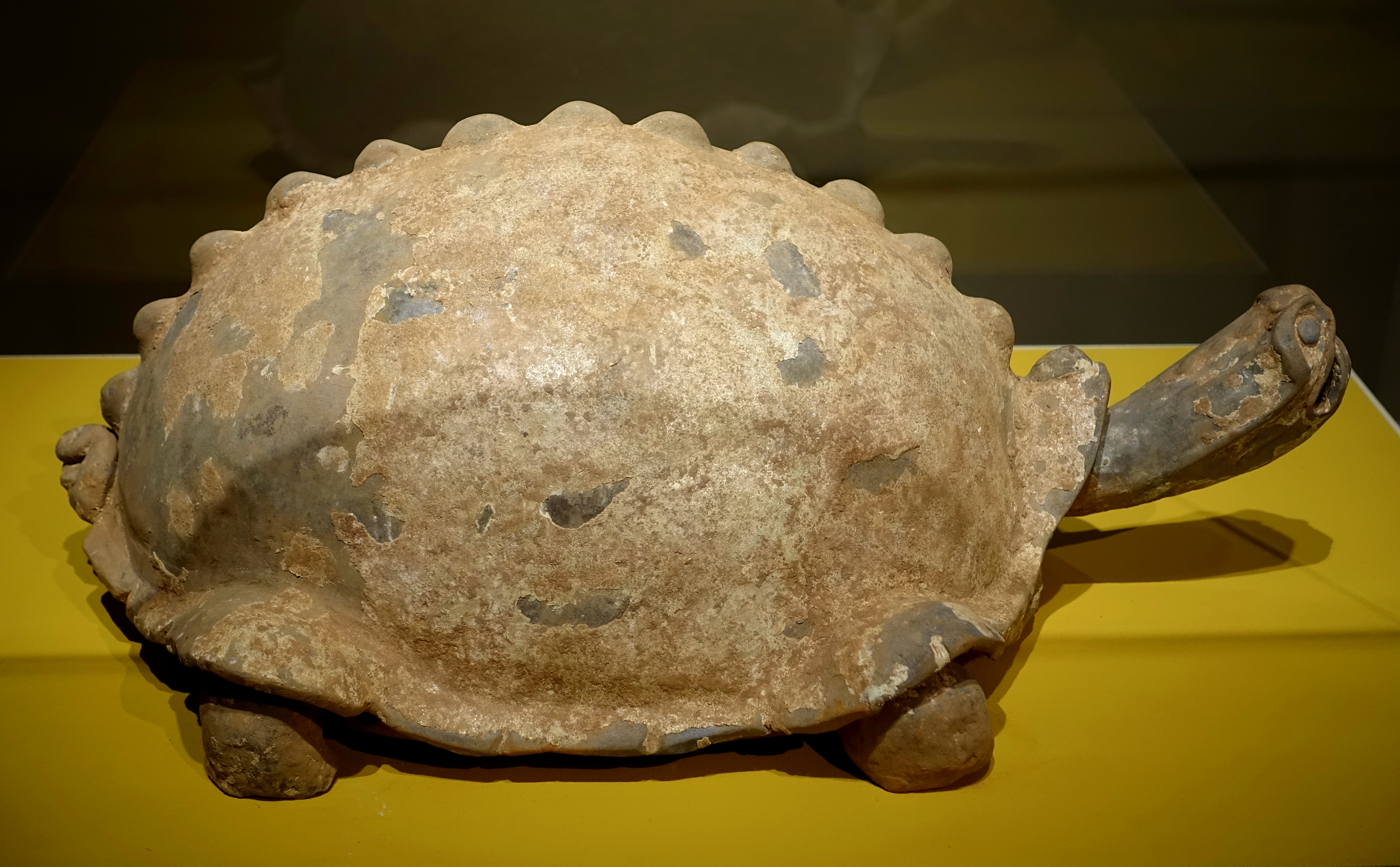
Statue of a tortoise, Han dynasty

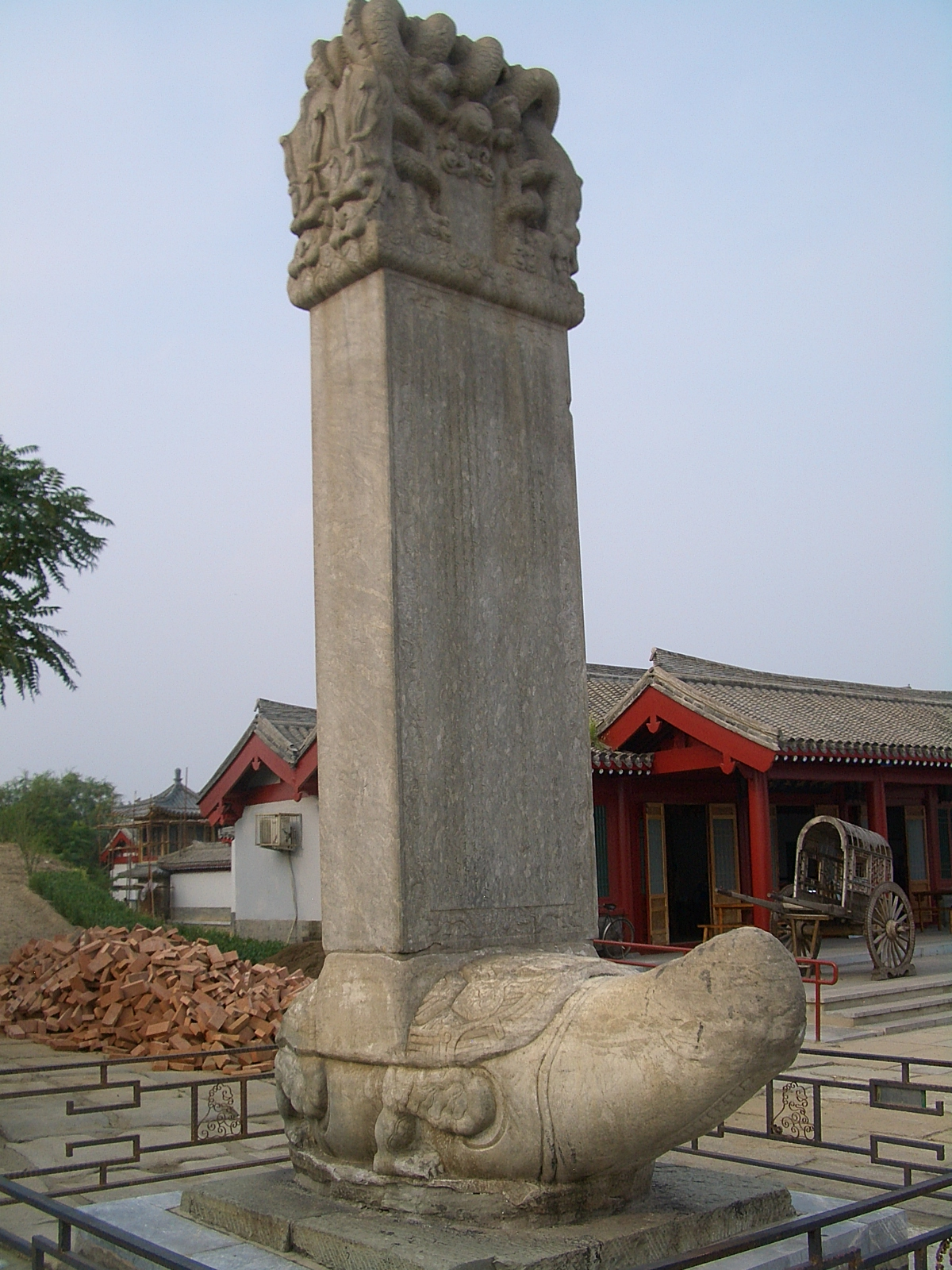
A bixi holding Kangxi Emperor's stele near Marco Polo Bridge, Beijing

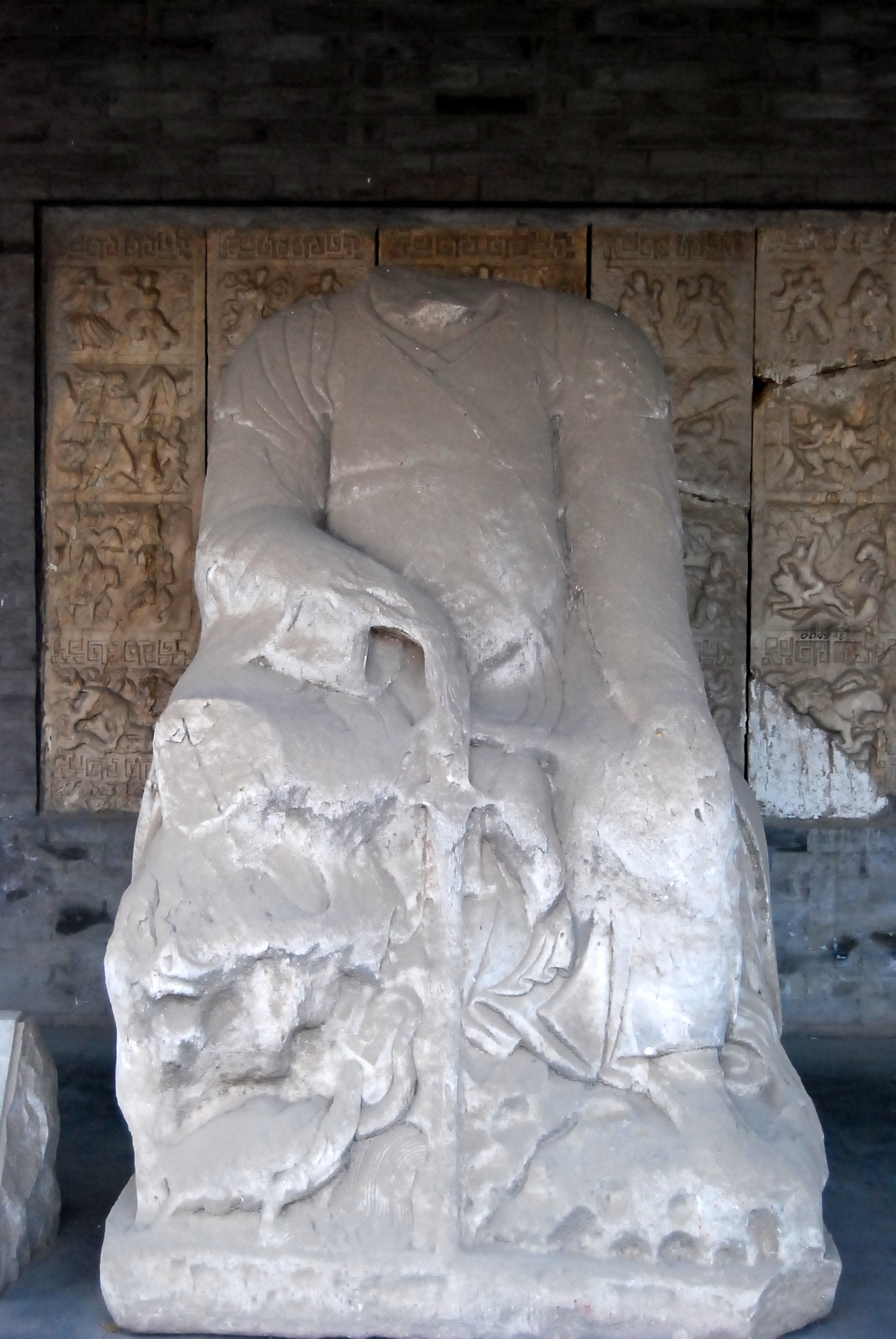
Zhenwu painted statue with turtle and snake at feet

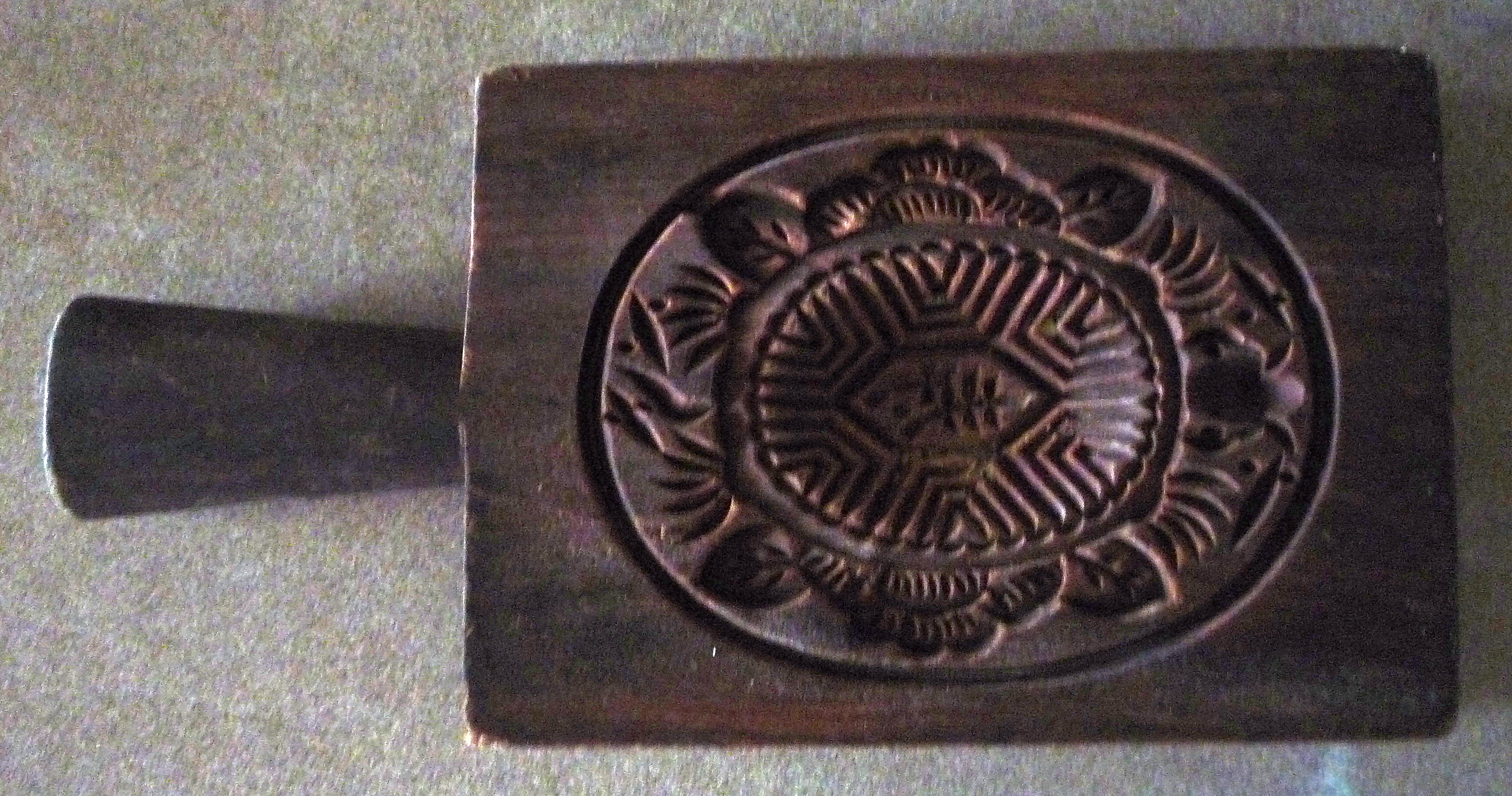
Wooden Red Tortoise Mould used in making Red Tortoise Cake

==== India ====
In Hindu mythology the world is thought to rest on the backs of four elephants who stand on the shell of a turtle. In Hinduism, Akupara is a tortoise who carries the world on his back, upholding the Earth and the sea.

One Avatar of Vishnu is the giant turtle Kurma. The Sri Kurmam Temple in Andhra Pradesh, India, is dedicated to the Kurma avatar. Kurmavatara is also Kasyapa, the northern star, the first living being, forefather of Vamana Avatar the protector. The plastron symbolizes the earthly world and the carapace the heavenly world. The Shatapatha Brahmana identifies the world as the body of Kurmaraja, the "king of tortoises", with the earth its plastron, the atmosphere its body, and the vault of the heavens its carapace. The tortoise holds the elephant, on which rests the earth. The elephant is the masculine symbol and the tortoise the feminine.

==== Japan ====
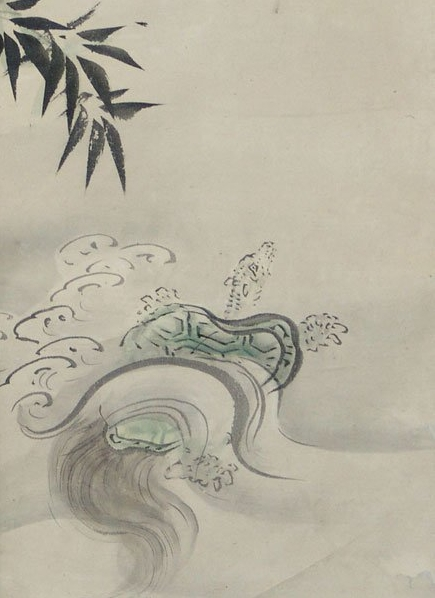
Japanese Edo period depiction of a minogame.

Japanese culture adopted from China the myth of four Guardian Beasts, said in Japan to protect the city of Heian (Kyoto) from threats arising from each of the four cardinal directions. The Black Tortoise or Gen-bu, sometimes depicted as a combination of a tortoise and a snake, protects Kyoto from the north; the other beasts and associated directions are the Azure Dragon (Sei-ryu, east), the Vermilion Bird (Su-zaku, south), and the White Tiger (Byak-ko, west).

In Japan, however, the turtle has developed a more independent tradition than the other three prominent beasts of China. The minogame (蓑亀), which is so old it has a train of seaweed growing on its back, is a symbol of longevity and felicity. A minogame has an important role in the well-known legend of Urashima Tarō.

According to traditional Japanese beliefs, the tortoise is a haven for immortals and the world mountain, and symbolizes longevity, good luck, and support. It is the symbol of Kompira, the god of seafaring people.

The tortoise is a favored motif by netsuke-carvers and other artisans, and is featured in traditional Japanese wedding ceremonies. There is also a well-known artistic pattern based on the nearly hexagonal shape of a tortoise's shell. These patterns are usually composed of symmetrical hexagons, sometimes with smaller hexagons within them.

==== Vietnam ====
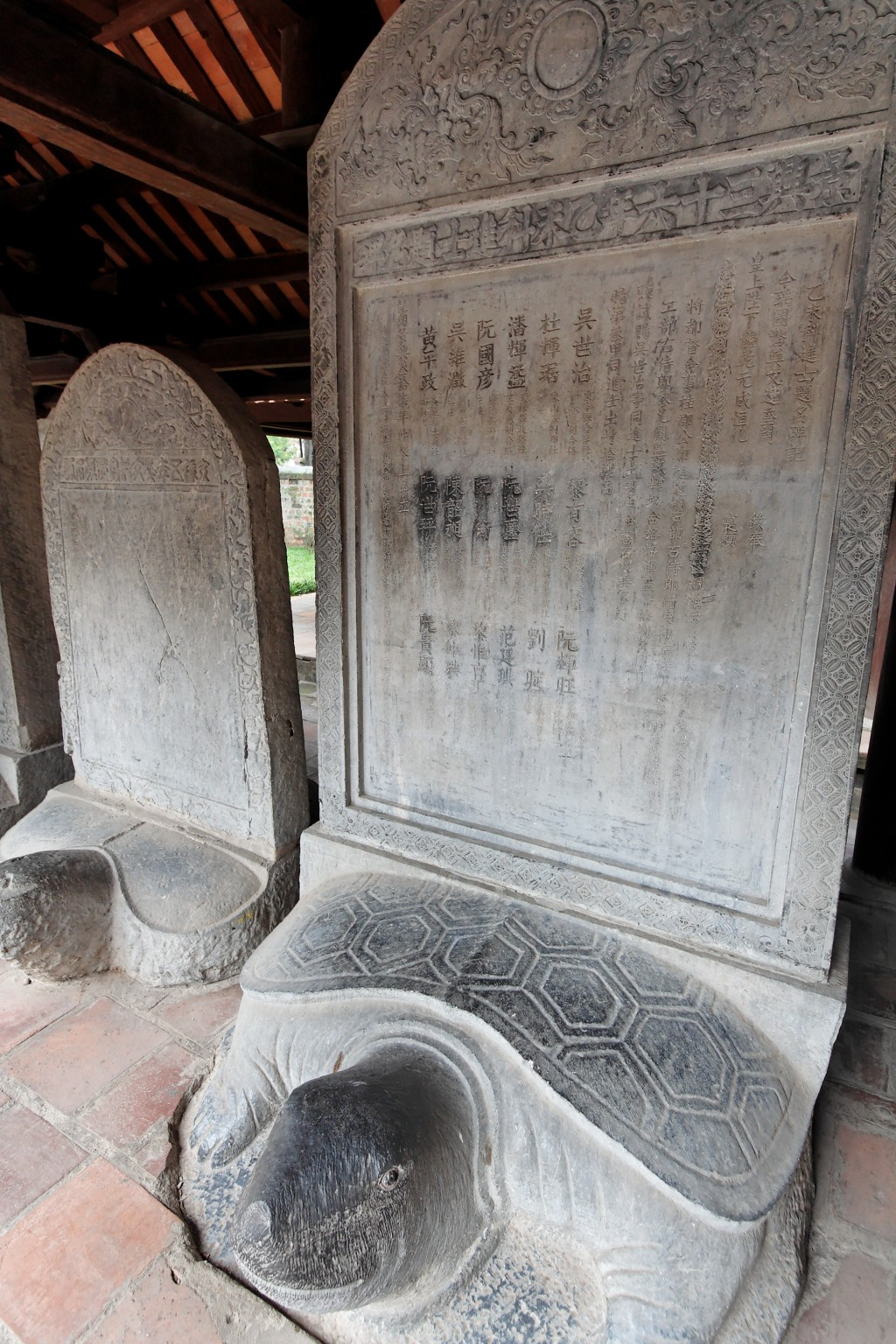
The stone turtle carries stela on its back Văn Miếu in Hanoi, Vietnam.

Many legends of Vietnam connect closely to the turtle. During the time of Emperor Yao in China, a Vietnamese King's envoy offered a sacred turtle (Vietnamese: Thần Quy) which was carved in Khoa Đẩu script on its carapace writing all things happening from the time Sky and Earth had been born. Yao King ordered a person to copy it and called it Turtle Calendar.

Another legend told that Kim Quy Deity (Golden Turtle Deity) came into sight and crawled after An Dương Vương's pray. Following the Deity's foot prints, An Dương Vương built Cổ Loa Citadel as a spiral. An Dương Vương was given a present of Kim Quy Deity's claw to make the trigger (Vietnamese: lẫy), one part of the crossbow (Vietnamese: nỏ) named Linh Quang Kim Trảo Thần Nỏ that was the military secret of victorious Zhao Tuo.

A 15th-century legend tells that Lê Lợi returned his sacred sword named Thuận Thiên (Heaven's Will) to Golden Turtle in Lục Thủy lake after he had defeated the Ming army. That is why Lục Thủy lake was renamed Sword Lake (Vietnamese: Hồ Gươm) or Returning Sword lake (Hoàn Kiếm Lake). This action symbolizes taking leave of weapons for peace.

==== Taiwan ====
In Taiwanese villages, paste cakes of flour shaped like turtles are made for festivals that are held in honor of the lineage patron deity. People buy these cakes at their lineage temple and take them home to assure prosperity, harmony, and security for the following year.

=== North America ===
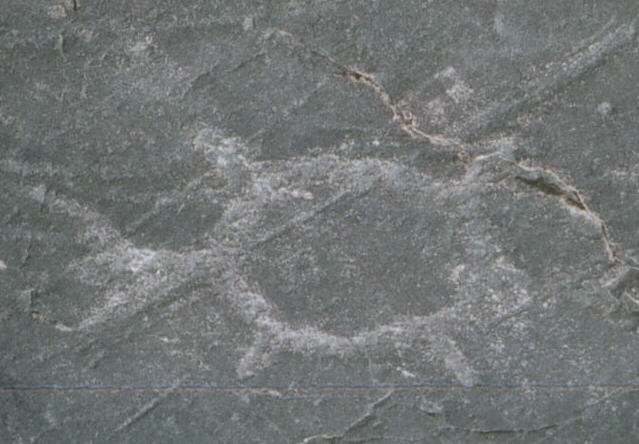
Pre-contact Native American petroglyph of a Turtle. Jeffers Petroglyphs, Minnesota

In the stories of many Indigenous groups of North America, the World Turtle carries the Earth upon its back. Many North American Indigenous groups, mostly in the northern and eastern areas of the continent, have in common a type of creation story called the Earth-Diver Myth in which a supreme being usually sends an animal into the primal waters to find bits of sand or mud with which to build habitable land; in many stories these are then used to build that land upon the base of a turtle's back. For this reason many Indigenous peoples of the continent refer to it as Turtle Island. Use of term "Turtle Island" for the North American continent expanded beyond those groups carrying these story traditions into more widespread pan-Indigenous use during Indigenous rights activism in the 1970s.

Most turtles have thirteen scales, or scutes, on the backs of their shells. In many Native American cultural traditions these scutes represented the thirteen full moons in each year, including those of the Haudenosaunee, the Anishinaabe other related Algonquian peoples, and the Wabanaki/Abenaki. In Cheyenne tradition, the great creator spirit Maheo kneads some mud he takes from a coot's beak until it expands so much that only Old Grandmother Turtle can support it on her back. In Haudenosaunee tradition, the trembling or shaking of the Earth is thought of as a sign that the World Turtle is stretching beneath the great weight that she carries. In the Anishinaabe creation story, Gchi-Mikinaak ("The Great Turtle") offers his back as a base in order to (re)build the world from mud brought up from the bottom of the great waters covering the world by another animal, usually by Wazhashk ("Muskrat").) In most versions of this story, this takes place after a Great Flood covers the world, and the land created on Turtle's back is the first to re-emerge, on which the Anishinaabeg will live from then on.

=== South America ===
Turtles are beloved by many Indigenous South American cultures and have thus entered their mythologies. According to many of these myths, the Jebuti (Portuguese: jabuti, pronounced [ʒabuˈtʃi], "land turtle") obtained its mottled shell in a fall to earth as it attempted to reach the heavens with the help of an eagle in order to play a flute at a celebration there.

=== Oceania ===
In the Tahitian islands, the tortoise is the shadow of the gods and the lord of the oceans.

In Polynesia the tortoise personifies the war god Tu. Drawing tattoo marks of a tortoise was a traditional custom among warriors. In a story from Admiralty Islands, people are born from eggs laid by the World Turtle. There are many similar creation stories throughout Polynesia.

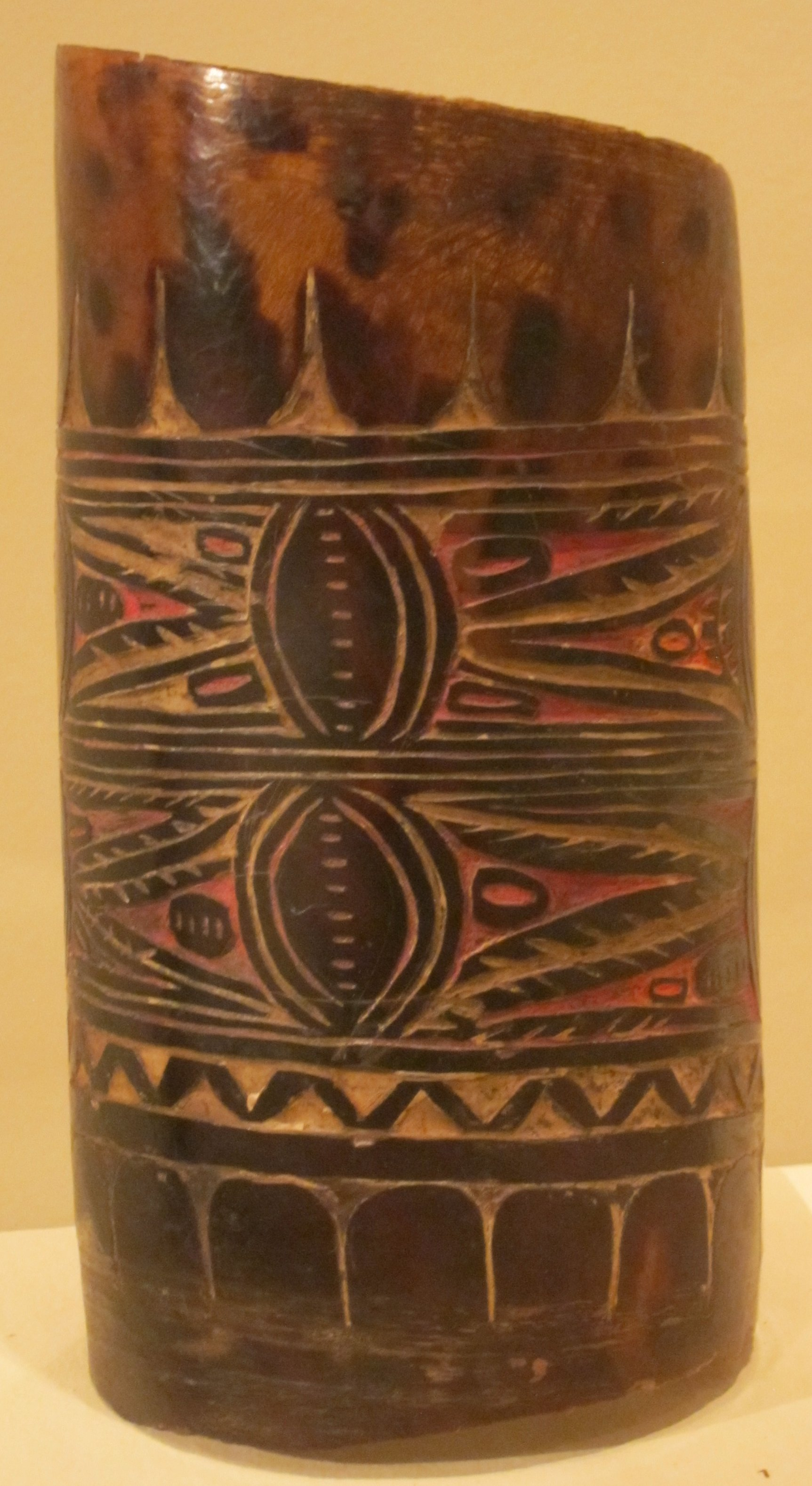
Turtle Armband, Papua New Guinea

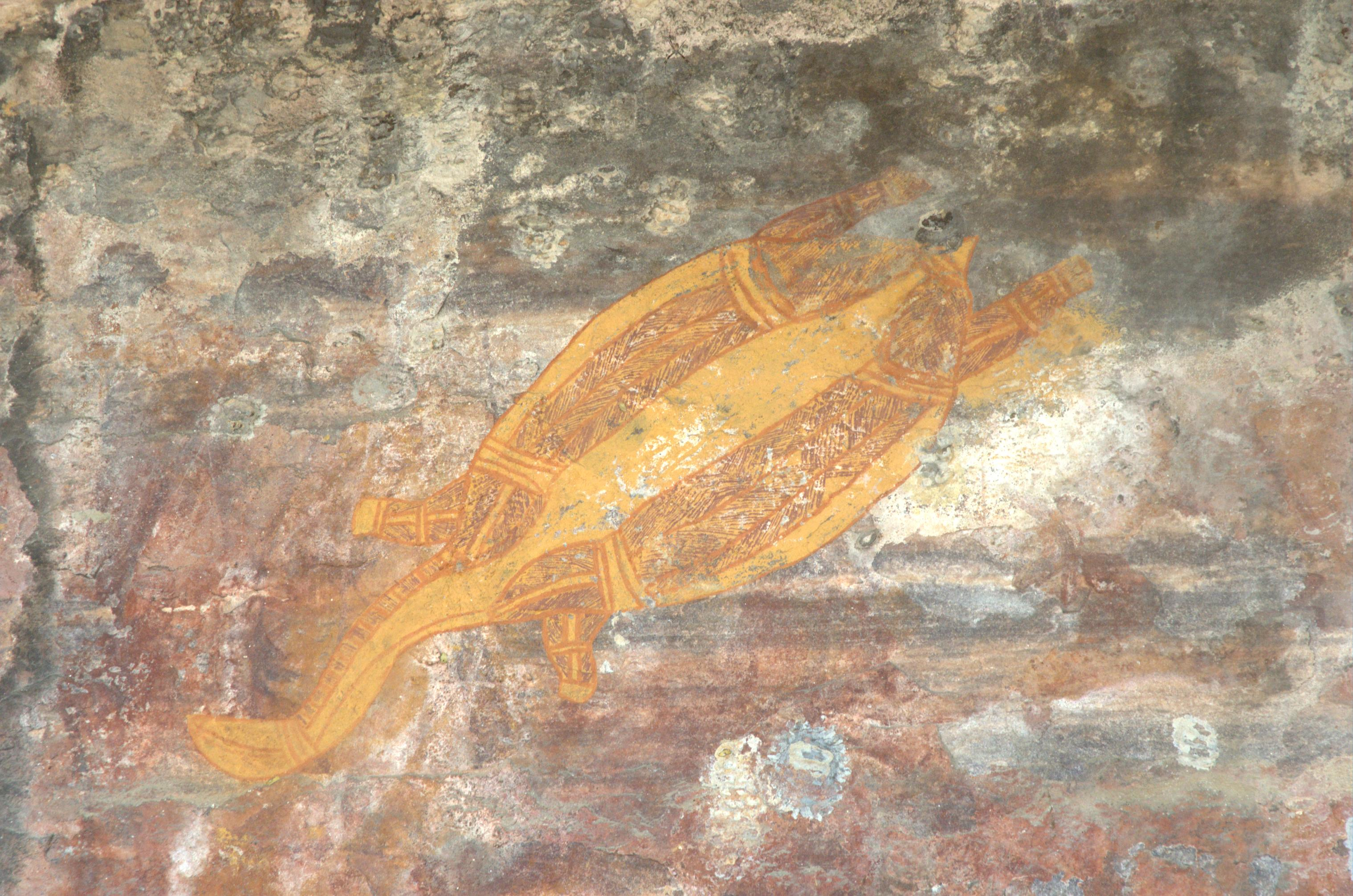
Rock-painting-turtle, Kakadu National Park, Australia

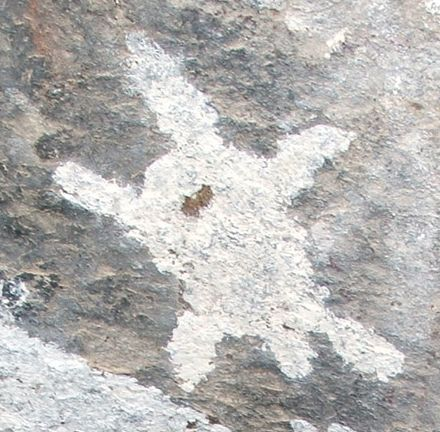
Turtle or echidna in Aboriginal art

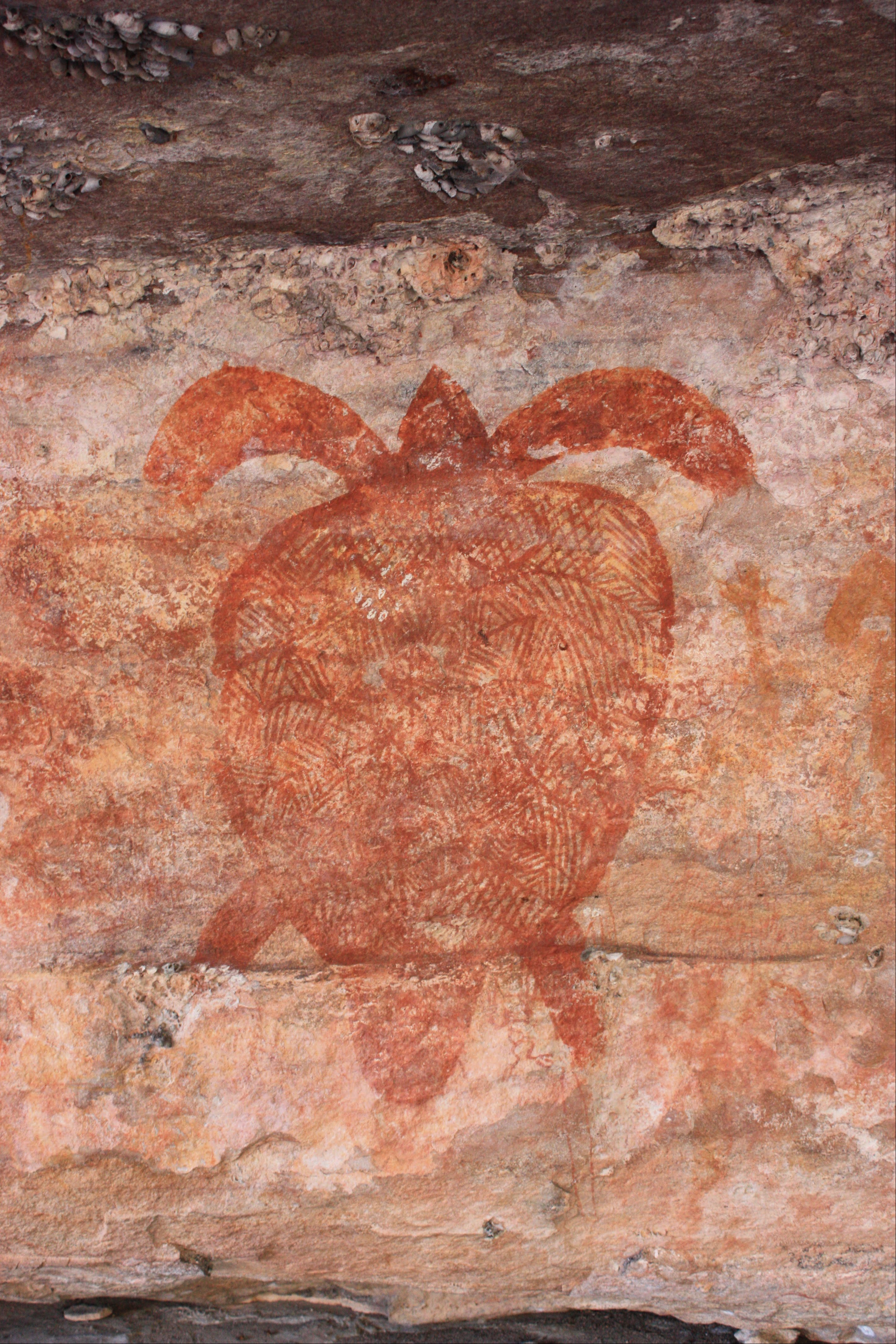
Sea turtle, Australia

== Religion ==
In Judaism, according to Torah Leviticus 11, the turtle is considered unclean and cannot be eaten.

In Sufism, the hatching and return of baby turtles to the sea is a symbol for returning to God through God's guidance. There are Quranic verses related to turtles such as "Extol the name of your Lord, the Highest, who has created and regulated, and has destined and guided" [87:1-3].

The early Christian scholar St Jerome recounted that the tortoise moves sluggishly because it is "burdened and heavy with its own weight ... signifying the grievous sin of the heretics". An early Christian curse tablet has been found that addresses "the most unclean spirit of a tortoise". In art turtles and tortoises were depicted as the “embodiment of evil in combat”

== In modern Western culture ==
=== Folklore ===
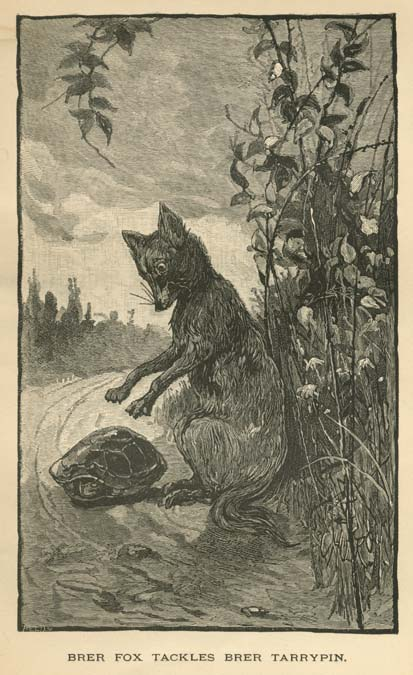
"Br'er Fox Tackles Br'er Tarrypin", from Uncle Remus, His Songs and His Sayings: The Folk-Lore of the Old Plantation

In Aesop's fable "The Tortoise and the Hare", a tortoise defeats an overconfident hare in a race.

=== Art ===
Osman Hamdi Bey's painting "The Tortoise Trainer" is one of the key works of late Ottoman Art and a social satire on the slow speed of reforms in the Ottoman Empire.

=== Literature ===
- Thomas King's novel The Back of the Turtle alludes to the idea of the World Turtle.
- In Stephen King's The Dark Tower series, the turtle is a prominent figure. Named Maturin, the turtle is one of the twelve guardians of the beams which hold up the dark tower. There is also a small carving of the turtle which is described as a 'tiny god'. A rhyme is recited by the characters, "See the TURTLE of enormous girth, on his shell he holds the Earth." This rhyme and the turtle also show up in King's novel It, where the turtle represents the opposition to the terror that is It.
- Turtle is a character who figures prominently in Barbara Kingsolver's novels The Bean Trees and Pigs in Heaven. She is a Cherokee child whose adoptive mother, Taylor Greer, so nicknamed her because Turtle grabs onto Taylor and will not let go. Taylor explains, "In Kentucky where I grew up, people used to say if a snapping turtle gets hold of you it won't let go till it thunders."
- In the books by Terry Pratchett, the Discworld is carried on the backs of four elephants, who in turn rest on the back of the gigantic world turtle Great A'Tuin. In the Discworld novel Small Gods, the Great God Om manifests as a tortoise.
- Anishinaabe writer Leanne Betasamosake Simpson's 2011 book Dancing on Our Turtle's Back references the Anishinaabe creation story of the world being built upon the shell of a giant turtle, exploring resurgence for Indigenous cultures oppressed by colonization.
- In The Grapes of Wrath, John Steinbeck uses the tortoise as an emblem of the resolve and persistence of the "Okies" that travel west across the US for a better life.

=== Children's books ===
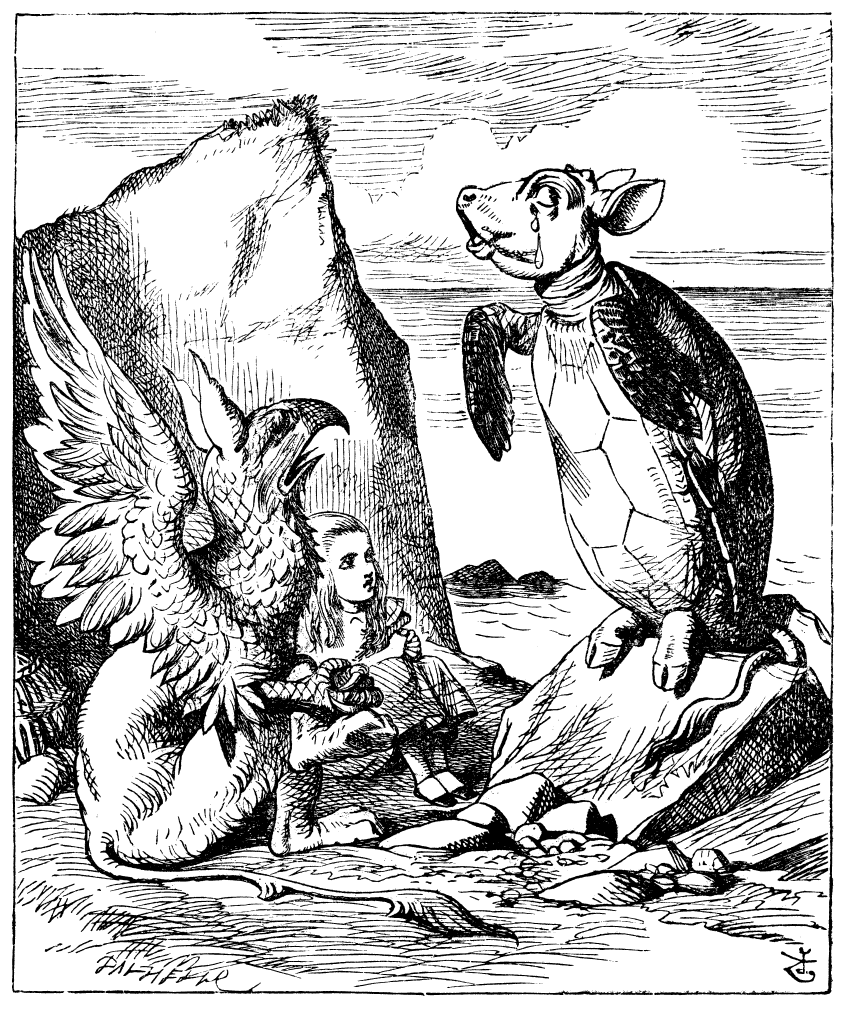
The Mock Turtle from Alice's Adventures in Wonderland

There is a character called the Mock Turtle in Lewis Carroll's 1865 novel Alice's Adventures in Wonderland. In the illustration by John Tenniel, the Mock Turtle is depicted as a turtle with the head, hooves, and tail of a calf; referencing the real ingredients of mock turtle soup.

In the children's story, Esio Trot by Roald Dahl, a character named Mrs. Silver has a small pet tortoise, Alfie, who she loves very much. One morning, Mrs. Silver mentions to Mr. Hoppy that even though she has had Alfie for many years, her pet has only grown a tiny bit and has gained only 3 ounces in weight. She confesses that she wishes she knew of some way to make her little Alfie grown into a larger, more dignified tortoise. Mr. Hoppy suddenly thinks of a way to give Mrs. Silver her wish and (he hopes) win her affection. He eventually begins swapping the tortoise for bigger and bigger ones, with the illusion of using magic.

In children's literature such as Dr. Seuss's Yertle the Turtle, the turtle is often depicted as a humorous character having a mixture of animal and human characteristics.

=== Film and television ===
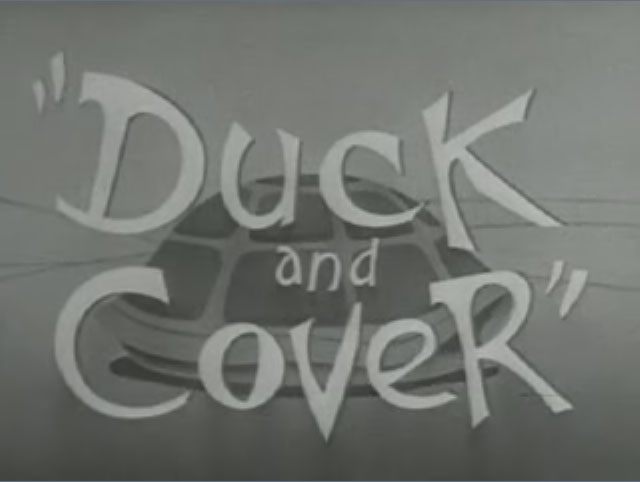
Bert the turtle

- Duck and Cover was a six-minute civil defense film that starred an animated character called Bert the Turtle.
- Gamera, a fire-breathing Japanese movie monster, is the star of twelve kaiju films from 1965 to 2006.
- The Teenage Mutant Ninja Turtles, created in 1983, are comic book characters whose adventures have been adapted for TV and film. The main characters, Leonardo, Raphael, Donatello, and Michelangelo, were named after the four renaissance artists. Their action figures were top sellers around the world. In 1990, the cartoon series was shown on more than 125 television stations every day and the comic books sold 125,000 copies a month.
- In the 2003 Disney/Pixar animated film Finding Nemo, Marlin a clownfish and Dory a regal blue tang are rescued by a school of sea turtles led by surfer-dude Crush and his son Squirt. They reappear in the 2016 sequel Finding Dory.
- A trio of Looney Tunes cartoons depicts Bugs Bunny racing the slow-moving Cecil Turtle in a contemporary version of one of Aesop's fables. The cartoons are Tortoise Beats Hare, Tortoise Wins by a Hare and Rabbit Transit. Because of this trio, Cecil is the only character in the Looney Tunes series who consistently gets the better of Bugs.
- Franklin the Turtle is the eponymous protagonist of Brenda Clarke and Paulette Bourgeois's books and television series about him in Canada. He appears anthropomorphically as a green-skinned child.

=== Video games ===
- Koopa Troopas (Japanese: ノコノコ Nokonoko) are common enemies in the Mario series which resemble tortoises, usually displayed as henchmen under the direct leadership of Bowser, who is also a Koopa.
- The Pokémon series has a few species resembling turtles or tortoises. Squirtle is the water-type 'starter' Pokémon in the Kanto region. Turtwig is likewise the grass-type starter Pokémon of the Sinnoh region. Tirtouga and Carracosta can be revived from fossil items in certain games.
- Chelonia cult in Grand Theft Auto V and Red Dead Redemption 2.
- Chelona's Rise and three turtle spirits in Elden Ring.

=== Sports ===
The athletic teams of the University of Maryland, College Park are known as the Maryland Terrapins (often shortened to "Terps") and compete at the highest level of collegiate athletics in the United States. The school mascot is an anthropomorphic diamondback terrapin named "Testudo" (for the Latin name for tortoises).

== In conservation and tourism ==
Sea turtles are used to promote tourism, as sea turtles can have a symbolic role in the imaginations of potential tourists. Tourists interact with turtles in countries such as France, Australia, Brazil, Costa Rica, Greece, and the United States. Turtle-based ecotourism activities take place on nesting beaches around the world. Sea turtles are on Tuvalu postage stamps as a national symbol.

Due to the turtle's status as a charismatic megafauna, it is a flagship animal for conservation efforts. Educating the public about turtles and conserving their habitats can positively affect other species living in the same habitats as turtles. Turtles are also used as marketing tools to give products the appearance of being environmentally friendly.

One of the most famous rescued sea turtles was "Allie", a 250 lb (113 kg), 50-year-old female loggerhead sea turtle rescued by a local commercial fisherman at Alligator Point, Florida, on May 15, 2012. Allie required 14 months of care at Gulf Specimen Marine Laboratory before she was returned to the wild on June 22, 2013. Thousands of people followed her recovery via social media and 1500 people came to see her released at Bald Point State Park, Florida.

Ecotourism has become popular in Brazil. In Praia do Forte, a marine conservation project called Tamar (from tartaruga marinha or sea turtle) receives more than 300,000 visitors every year, who are attracted by the idea of saving the habitat of five endangered sea turtle species that nest on the coast. Tamar uses the sea turtle as a symbol for the need for the protection of the coastal environment. Turtle-related souvenirs are sold to tourists, and hotels are "turtle-friendly": low-rise, dimly lit, and located away from the beach.

At the World Trade Organization's 1999 meeting in Seattle, sea turtles were a focal point of protests. A group of protesters from the Earth Island Institute that focused on the issue of TED use in shrimp trawls wore sea turtle costumes. They brought 500 turtle costumes to the demonstration. Images of protesters wearing turtle costumes were carried in the media, and they became a symbol of the anti-globalization movement.

== See also ==
- Owen and Mzee, a real-life friendship between an old Aldabra giant tortoise and a baby hippopotamus.
- Mbeku
- The Turtle Prince (South Indian folktale)
- Turtle racing
- Turtle soup
- Zaratan

== General sources ==
- Pryke, Louise (2021). Turtle. London: Reaktion Books. ISBN 978-1-78914-336-2. OCLC 1223025640.
