= Chữ khoa đẩu =

Pseudohistorical ancient Vietnamese script

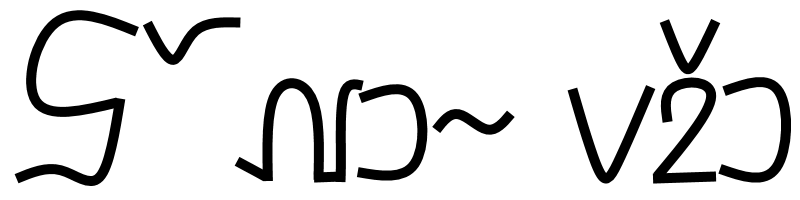
- Script type: Alphabet/Abugida
- Languages: Vietnamese language, Muong language

Related scripts
- Parent systems: Brahmic scripts: Chữ khoa đẩu

Chữ khoa đẩu is a term claimed by the Vietnamese pseudohistorian Đỗ Văn Xuyền to be an ancient, pre-Sinitic script for the Vietnamese language. Đỗ Văn Xuyền's works supposedly shows the script have been in use during the Hồng Bàng period, and it is believed to have disappeared later during the Chinese domination of Vietnam because the document written in the script get burned by Ma Yuan (Han dynasty)

The script is supposed to have 30 basic consonant signs and is identical to the Tai Viet script, which Xuyền might have been inspired from. The Tai Viet script has been used by the Tai Dam people since the 16th century, and there is no evidence it had been used to transcribe the Vietnamese language. In 2013, Đỗ Văn Xuyền published a book in which he claimed to have deciphered "chữ khoa đẩu" used by the ancient Lạc Việt. His claims, like the earlier ones by Bửu Cầm or Lê Trọng Khánh, lack of any historical evidence and scientific basis and is not recognized by mainstream historians. Media investigations have found the script is indeed based on the Brahmic scripts used by Tai peoples in Vietnam.

== See also ==
- Tadpole script
