= Mbeku =

Animal character from African folklore

Mbeku Igbo: [m̩.be.ku] (from the Igbo word for tortoise) is the trickster tortoise in Igbo and West African folktales.

== Tales ==
In one aetiological tale Mbeku gets taken by the birds to a feast in the sky. When he eats all the food, the birds stop him from flying back to the earth, and he falls, which is how the tortoises got the patterns on their shells.

In an Igbo fable Mbeku (or Mbe) persuades Grasshopper (Ukpana) to help fake sadness on the death of his father-in-law, so that he can get food from his kinsmen, but breaks his pledge to share the food. The grasshopper betrays him to his kinsfolk, who kill him.

== Bibliography ==
- The Flying Tortoise, Tololwa M. Mollel, illustrated by Barbara Spurll, Toronto, Oxford University Press, 1994, ISBN 0-19-540990-6.
- Anthropological report on the Ibo-speaking peoples of Nigeria. Northcote W Thomas, 1913, London, Harrison
