= Post turtle =

Political joke

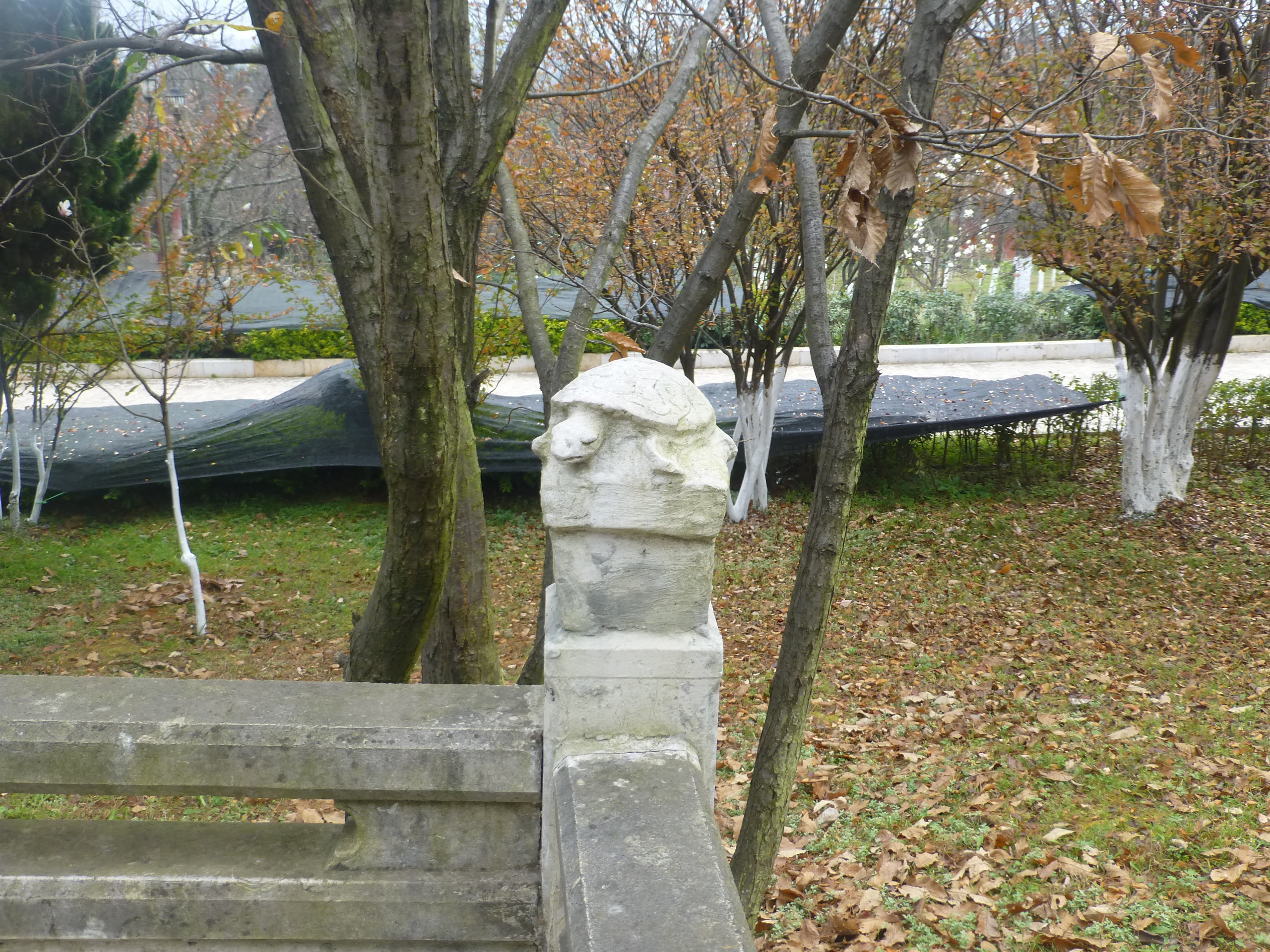
Stone turtle on a fence post, a design in a park in Kunyang, Yunnan

"Post turtle" is a phrase that has been used in the political discourse of various countries based on an old joke about the leader of a group being comparable to a turtle balanced on top of a fence post.

== History ==
On Good Morning America in 1998, Hillary Clinton said, "If you find a turtle on a fence post, it didn't get there by accident, and I just look at the landscape around here, and I see just lots of big old turtles sitting on lots of fence posts, and I think we need to find out how those old turtles got on those fence posts."

== See also ==
- Puppet leader
- Power behind the throne
- Shadow government (conspiracy theory)
