= List of fictional rabbits and hares =

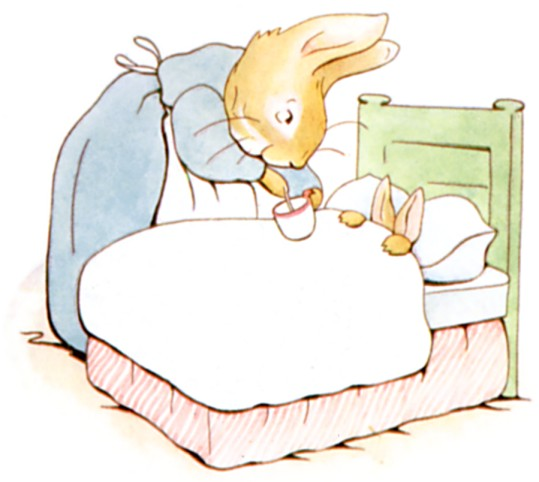
Peter Rabbit by Beatrix Potter

This is a list of fictional rabbits and hares (Leporidae). Fantasy hybrids such as jackalopes are not listed.

== Literature ==
Name	Species	Work	Author	Notes
Alice	Cottontail rabbit	Alice's Farm: A Rabbit's Tale	Maryrose Wood	Alice and her brother, Thistle, become farmers to save Prune Street Farm from development. They learn how to farm, befriending and recruiting the children of the farm's new owners as well as various other animals, including a dog, wolf, eagle, chipmunks, other bunnies and a weasel, work the farm. Published 2020 by Fewel & Friends, NY. Reviewed in NY Times Book Review section, Nov. 21, 2020, Publishers Weekly (4/29/2020) and elsewhere.
Babbitty Rabbitty	Rabbit	The Tales of Beedle the Bard	J. K. Rowling	While at first a human witch, Babbitty transforms herself into a rabbit.
Basil Stag Hare	Hare	Redwall & Mattimeo	Brian Jacques	Basil gave himself the middle name "Stag" because he greatly admired that animal. Basil is a bit eccentric, but an excellent fighter.
Benjamin Bunny	Rabbit	The Tale of Benjamin Bunny, The Tale of The Flopsy Bunnies, The Tale of Mr. Tod	Beatrix Potter	Son of Old Mr. Bouncer, Peter Rabbit's cousin and eventually Flopsy's husband and father of six bunnies.
Bigwig	Rabbit	Watership Down	Richard Adams	The largest, bravest rabbit of the group who escape destruction at the Sandleford warren, he is "bluff and tough." While helping to defend the rabbits' new home at Watership Down from an invasion, he famously delivers the line, "My Chief Rabbit has told me to defend this run and until he says otherwise I shall stay here." Bigwig matures over the course of the novel and saves Watership Down because he "used cunning as well as his strength" in the climactic battle.
Br'er Rabbit	Rabbit	Uncle Remus	Joel Chandler Harris	
Bunnicula	Rabbit	Bunnicula: A Rabbit-Tale of Mystery, Howliday Inn, The Celery Stalks at Midnight, Nighty Nightmare, Return to Howliday Inn, Bunnicula Strikes Again!, Bunnicula Meets Edgar Allan Crow	Deborah and James Howe	A vampire bunny that sucks the juice out of vegetables.
Bunny Queen Janet	Rabbit	Voyage to the Bunny Planet	Rosemary Wells	The queen of the Bunny Planet, who helps poor rabbit children in distress who have a bad day.
Buster Baxter	Rabbit	Arthur	Marc Brown	A white anthropomorphic rabbit who is Arthur's best friend and has an obsession with aliens.
Cecily Parsley	Rabbit	Cecily Parsley's Nursery Rhymes	Beatrix Potter	
Cottontail	Rabbit	The Country Bunny and the Little Gold Shoes	Dubose Heyward	Mother of twenty-one bunnies who is picked to be an Easter Bunny and is given the little golden shoes so as to deliver a very special Easter egg to a sick child
E. Aster Bunnymund	Rabbit	The Guardians of Childhood	William Joyce	
Edward Tulane	Rabbit	The Miraculous Journey of Edward Tulane	Kate DiCamillo	
Fierce Bad Rabbit	Rabbit	The Story of a Fierce Bad Rabbit	Beatrix Potter	A bad tempered rabbit who ends up losing his whiskers and tail.
Fiver	Rabbit	Watership Down	Richard Adams	An undersized rabbit who can occasionally foretell the future - a "small mystical rabbit, a kind of Cassandra" - he saves the lives of a dozen rabbits from the Sandleford warren, one from Cowslip's warren, and several more from Efrafa. He is listed among "The 50 Best Animated Movie Characters" by Empire magazine. (Note: Oracular characters in the Lost television series have been compared with Fiver.)
Flopsy	Rabbit	The Tale of Peter Rabbit, The Tale of The Flopsy Bunnies, The Tale of Mr. Tod	Beatrix Potter	One of Peter Rabbit's sisters and eventually Benjamin's wife and mother to six bunnies.
Flopsy Bunnies	Rabbit	The Tale of The Flopsy Bunnies, The Tale of Mr. Tod	Beatrix Potter	Benjamin and Flopsy's six children.
General Jackrabbit	Jackrabbit	Ricky Ricotta's Mighty Robot vs. the Jurassic Jackrabbits from Jupiter	Dav Pilkey	The leader of Jupiter and the main antagonist. He decides to invade Earth and attack the city of Squeakyville with the "Jurassic jackrabbits" he created on Ricky's birthday.
God	Rabbit	When God Was a Rabbit	Sarah Winman	A pet rabbit given to Elly by her brother who is a constant companion during her childhood.
Grandfather Bunny	Rabbit	The Country Bunny and the Little Gold Shoes	Dubose Heyward	Lives in the Palace of Easter Eggs and is responsible for picking the five kindest, swiftest, and wisest rabbits or hares as Easter Bunnies.
Harvey	Pooka	Harvey (play) Harvey (film)	Mary Chase	Elwood P. Dowd is an affable man who claims to have an unseen (and presumably imaginary) friend Harvey — whom Elwood describes as a six-foot, three-and-one-half-inch tall pooka resembling an anthropomorphic rabbit. (from Irish/Celtic mythology)
Hazel / Hazel-rah	Rabbit	Watership Down	Richard Adams	Hazel becomes the "Chief Rabbit" of a group who flee from a disaster and create a new home on a hill called Watership Down; the group includes Fiver, Bigwig, Blackberry, Dandelion, Pipkin, Silver, Holly, Bluebell, Speedwell, Hawkbit, Buckthorn, Acorn and many others. Hazel is loyal to all of the rabbits in his new clan; he is a "courageous pioneer;" and he is willing both to accept responsibility for his decisions and to trust his friends to make good decisions of their own.
Hester	Arctic Hare	His Dark Materials	Philip Pullman	The dæmon of Lee Scoresby.
Hops	Rabbit	Fifteen Rabbits	Felix Salten	Main character of the novel.
Jack Hare	Hare	Masquerade	Kit Williams	
Lille Skutt	Rabbit	Bamse	Rune Andréasson	Given the name "Little Frisky" in English.
Lily	Rabbit	Cookie	Jacqueline Wilson	
Little Georgie	Rabbit	Rabbit Hill	Robert Lawson	
Little Grey Rabbit	Rabbit	Little Grey Rabbit	Alison Uttley	A modest busybody, who enjoys her work and cares for her two friends Hare and Squirrel.
Lively Little Rabbit	Rabbit	The Lively Little Rabbit	Ariane	A playful young rabbit who gets tangles with a hungry mean weasel, befriends a red squirrel and owl and with all his friends and family, drive out the weasel.
March Hare	Hare	Alice's Adventures in Wonderland	Lewis Carroll	Equally as mad as the Hatter and also believes it is always tea-time.
Marlon Bundo	Rabbit	A Day in the Life of Marlon Bundo	Jill Twiss	Details the same-sex romance between Marlon Bundo and another rabbit named Wesley in a loose parody of a real-life pet rabbit in Marlon Bundo's A Day in the Life of the Vice President.
Max	Rabbit	Max & Ruby	Rosemary Wells	Ruby's little brother, who usually says one word or sentence in each book and seems to arouse problems for Ruby and her friends.
Miffy	Rabbit	Miffy	Dick Bruna	Usually the main Character of the books. Miffy is a little girl rabbit. Who likes to draw. And also likes to play with her friends.
Nutbrown Hares	Hares	Guess How Much I Love You	Sam McBratney	A father hare and his son who spend a lot of time playing together throughout the seasons.
Pantoufle	Imaginary Rabbit	Chocolat	Joanne Harris (novel) Robert Nelson Jacobs (screenplay)	In the novel, Anouk Rocher, daughter of Vianne, is a precocious child, who often plays with her imaginary friend, a rabbit named Pantoufle (French for 'slipper'; pronounced /pɑ̃tufl/). (the eponymous film changed the animal type to a kangaroo)
Pat	Rabbit	Pat the Bunny	Dorothy Kunhardt	
Peter Cottontail	Rabbit	Peter Cottontail	Thornton Burgess	A prominent character in the "Old Mother West Wind" series, in some books known as Peter Rabbit.
Peter Rabbit	Rabbit	The Tale of Peter Rabbit, The Tale of Benjamin Bunny, The Tale of The Flopsy Bunnies, The Tale of Mr. Tod	Beatrix Potter	Flopsy's brother and Benjamin Bunny's cousin.
Pookie	Rabbit	Pookie, Pookie and the Gypsies, Pookie Puts the World Right, Pookie in Search of a Home, Pookie believes in Santa Claus, Pookie at the Seaside, Pookie's Big Day, Pookie and the Swallows, Pookie in Wonderland, Pookie and his Shop	Ivy Wallace	A small white rabbit with wings.
Pupu Tupuna	Rabbit	Pupu Tupuna	Pirkko Koskimies	
Rabbit	Rabbit	Hurry Up, Franklin	Paulette Bourgeois	A jolly, somewhat goofy Eastern cottontail individual and the best long jumper in the class.
Rabbit	Rabbit	Winnie-the-Pooh	A. A. Milne	He is a good friend of Winnie-the-Pooh. He is always practical and keeps his friends on their toes, although they sometimes raise his ire unintentionally.
Ralph	Rabbit	Bunny Trouble	Hans Wilhelm	A bunny who loves soccer over the others' Easter traditions. Followed by sequels Bad, Bad Bunny Trouble and More Bunny Trouble
Responsible Rabbit	Rabbit	Sweet Pickles	Ruth Lerner Perle, Jacquelyn Reinach, and Richard Hefter	The town's banker, who never seems to deviate from his constantly busy schedule.
Robo-Rabbits	Robot jackrabbit	Ricky Ricotta's Mighty Robot vs. the Jurassic Jackrabbits from Jupiter	Dav Pilkey	General Jackrabbit's personal assistants. They cease to follow his orders after falling in crazy love with Lucy and instead begin making her the treats that she requests.
Roger Rabbit	Rabbit	Who Censored Roger Rabbit?	Gary Wolf	A comic striped rabbit who was censored/murdered, thus preventing him from having his own strip.
Ruby	Rabbit	Max & Ruby	Rosemary Wells	Max's big sister who spends most of her time keeping an eye on Max and trying to keep him out of trouble. Despite Max's persistence she is very patient with him.
Runny Babbit	Rabbit	Runny Babbit	Shel Silverstein	
Seeing hare	Hare	The Magician King	Lev Grossman	One of the Unique Beasts of Fillory. According to legend, its gift is to predict the future of any person that catches it.
Serena	Hare	The Little White Horse	Elizabeth Goudge	Maria saved her from the Men from the Dark Woods.
Steel-Bunz/Fluffy	Rabbit	The Gameworld Trilogy	Samit Basu	A trained assassin, and security guard of prince Asvin.
Uncle Wiggily	Rabbit	Uncle Wiggily	Howard R. Garis	An engaging elderly rabbit, lame from rheumatism and targeted by many predators.
Velveteen Rabbit	Rabbit	The Velveteen Rabbit	Margery Williams	A plushy toy rabbit that is transformed into a real rabbit by love and care from his owner.
White Rabbit	Rabbit	Alice's Adventures in Wonderland	Lewis Carroll	A rabbit wearing a waistcoat and a pocket watch. Has an important appointment with the Duchess and later serves as the Queen of Heart's herald.

== Comics ==
Name	Species	Origin	Notes
3	Rabbit	We3	Also known as Pirate
Billy Bunny Sr.	Rabbit	Over the Hedge	An associate of Hammy Sammy Squirrel whose interests are Catholicism and extreme sports. He also has a son.
Binky Binkenstein	Rabbit	Life in Hell	A chronically embittered rabbit employed as an author.
Bobo	Rabbit	Bobo	A nine-year-old blue rabbit and star of his own comic series and magazine, Bob. He was created by Sergio Cavina.
Bongo Binkenstein	Rabbit	Life in Hell	A one-eared rabbit teenager who is Binky's son.
Boss Rabbit	Rabbit	Dragon Ball	Also known as Monster Carrot. A mafia boss whose touch can turn people into carrots.
Bun-Bun	Rabbit	Sluggy Freelance	A psychotic rabbit with a switchblade.
Bunnista	Rabbit	Minimum Security	The one-eyed cosmetic-testing victim.
Bunnie Rabbot	Rabbit	Sonic the Hedgehog (Archie Comics)	Based on the same character from the Sonic the Hedgehog (SatAM) cartoon series.
Bunny	Rabbit	Bunny	
Bun Rab	Rabbit	Pogo	An enthusiastic white rabbit with a drum and drum-major hat who often accompanies P. T. Bridgeport and likes to broadcast news in the manner of a town crier. He lives in a grandfather clock.
Buster Bunny	Rabbit	Buster Bunny	A comic-book character from the 1940s and '50s by Standard Comics.
Captain Carrot	Rabbit	Captain Carrot and His Amazing Zoo Crew!	Leader of the "funny-animal" superhero group.
Carrot	Rabbit	One Piece	A member of the "Mink" tribe of anthropomorphic animal folk & ally to the Straw Hat Pirates.
Clothaire	Hare	Sibylline	A friend of Sibylline.
Clover	Rabbit	Happy Happy Clover	An energetic rabbit who lives in Crescent Forest who dreams on traveling and is also prone to getting herself in trouble
Cutey Bunny	Rabbit	Army Surplus Komikz	Cutey Bunny (a.k.a. "QT Bunny" for short) is secretly Cpl. Kelly O'Hare, a special agent for the United States, based in Washington, D.C., and employed by an unspecified branch of the United States Armed Forces.
Frederick Dickinson	Rabbit (transformed human)	Judecca	A man in hell transformed into a rabbit for his sins. Works as a bookkeeper.
Lola Duster	Rabbit	Treshakai	A teen yellow bunny.
Geraldinho	Rabbit	Turma do Pererê	
Happy Bunny	Rabbit	It's Happy Bunny	An antisocial rabbit once-commonly found on girls' shirts, stickers, and other merchandise.
Haru	Dwarf rabbit	Beastars	
Hodge-Podge	Rabbit	Bloom County	He is politically conservative and fanatical about various issues, despite the fact that he is extremely ignorant about those same issues.
Holle Pinkel	Rabbit	Holle Pinkel	The protagonist of a Dutch comic strip, created by Andries Brandt in 1961.
Honey Bunny	Rabbit	Acorn Green	
Honey Bunny	Rabbit	Bugs Bunny comic book	Bugs Bunny's girlfriend.
Hoppy the Marvel Bunny	Rabbit	Marvel Family	A pink bunny rabbit who lives in the town of Funny Animalville. One day he decides to emulate his hero Captain Marvel and speaks the magic word "Shazam!". Surprisingly, the magic word transforms Hoppy into Captain Marvel Bunny.
Hops	Hare	Fix und Foxi	A hare who forms a duo with Stops the hedgehog.
Jack and Jill	Rabbit	Funny Bunnies	
Jack	Rabbit	Jack	
Jaxxon	Rabbit	Star Wars	A rabbit-like Lepi smuggler from Coachelle Prime and acquaintance of Han Solo.
Jimmy	Rabbit	Chronicles of Wormwood	
Kale	Rabbit	Happy Happy Clover	A brown male rabbit and one of Clover's friends. He's mischievous but also a very strong and protective of his brothers..
Kevin Dewclaw	Rabbit	Kevin and Kell	
Lord Big Rabbit	Rabbit	Monica's Gang	A villain who first appeared in the films.
Mashimaro	Rabbit	Mashimaro	A Korean fictional character who resembles a fat rabbit
Max	Rabbit	Sam & Max	Described as a 'hyperkinetic rabbity thing'.
Miyamoto Usagi	Rabbit	Usagi Yojimbo	A masterless samurai rabbit in feudal Japan
Mallow	Rabbit	Happy Happy Clover	A shy Holland Lop who is best friends with Clover.
Mell	Rabbit	Wish me mell	The main protagonist of Sanrio's Wish me mell series. She is a white bunny with a rainbow-colored tail.
Mr. Bun	Rabbit	Calvin and Hobbes	Susie's stuffed rabbit.
Mr. Zig Zag	Rabbit	Lionel's Kingdom	Wears glasses and lives under the ground, on a burrow filled with his uncountable children.
Mokona Modoki	Rabbit	Magic Knight Rayearth, xxxHolic, Tsubasa: Reservoir Chronicle	A magical rabbit-like being who is the mascot of the manga artist team CLAMP.
Momiji Sohma	Rabbit	Fruits Basket	A boy cursed to turn into a rabbit whenever he is touched by a female.
Nailbunny	Rabbit	Johnny the Homicidal Maniac	
Blackjack O'Hare	Hare	Marvel Comics	An anthropomorphic hare and mercenary who is an enemy of Rocket Raccoon.
Oz Vessalius	Rabbit	Pandora Hearts	The Bloodstained Black Rabbit, B-Rabbit for short. The most powerful chain in the Abyss.
Panku Ponk	Rabbit	Panku Ponk	An oversized bunny.
Peter Rabbit	Rabbit	Peter Rabbit	The protagonist in a talking animal comic strip, created by Harrison Cady and continued by Vincent Fago.
Petulia	Rabbit	Pinky	Girlfriend of Pinky the rabbit, created by Massimo Mattioli.
Pinky	Rabbit	Pinky	A pink rabbit in a surreal world, created by Massimo Mattioli.
Reggie and Rex	Rabbit	Rupert Bear	Two twin rabbits and good friends of Rupert.
Ruby Rabbit	Rabbit	Bobby Bear	A friend of Bobby Bear
Samson	Rabbit	Monica's Gang	Monica's stuffed rabbit.
Schnuffel	Rabbit		Created by Jamba! appearing in ringtones and songs, notably "Kuschel Song".
Schnuffelienchen	Rabbit		Created by Jamba! appearing in ringtones and songs and also Schnuffel's girlfriend.
Serpolet	Rabbit	Chlorophylle	Friend of Chlorophylle.
Sheba Jones	Rabbit	Life in Hell	An easily irked yuppie executive rabbit and Binky Binkenstein's girlfriend.
Super Rabbit	Rabbit	Super Rabbit	
Shallot	Rabbit	Happy Happy Clover	A smart and intelligent friend of Clover who has a secret crush on Mallow.
Shiina	Rabbit (cursed human)	Oumagadoki Zoo	A former human cursed into rabbitmen and owner of Oumagadoki Zoo.
Space Bunny	Rabbit		Created by Bella Dalton-Fenkl, this character has been appearing in her strip with the same name in Korean Quarterly for twelve years.
Thunderbunny	Rabbit	Thunderbunny	Superhero created by Martin Greim in 1982.
Wilfred	Rabbit	Pip, Squeak and Wilfred	Best friend of Pip and Squeak.
White Rabbit	Rabbit	Code 1: Dante	An anthropomorphic rabbit demon.
Wipperoen	Dune Rabbit	Wipperoen	Comics character created in 1961 by Dutch artists Bär and Jan van der Reek.
Wonder Wabbit	Rabbit	Just'a Lotta Animals	The Earth-C-Minus counterpart of Wonder Woman.

== Video media ==
=== Film ===
Name	Species	Film	Notes
Alec Azam	Rabbit	Presto	Magician's assistant who is more interested in carrots.
Bean Bunny	Rabbit	The Tale of the Bunny Picnic	A rabbit who is pretty much overlooked by others until he saves everyone from the farmer's dog.
E. Aster Bunnymund (Bunny)	Unspecified, likely Púca	Rise of the Guardians	6'1" humanoid rabbit, Guardian of Hope
E.B.	Rabbit	Hop	The titular character who has a very different passion in drumming as opposed to his family's Easter traditions.
Frank	Rabbit	Donnie Darko	The 7-foot-tall (2.1 m) apocalyptic rabbit.
Hartley Hare	Hare	Pipkins	
Harvey	Pooka	Harvey	
Mimzy	Rabbit	The Last Mimzy	The stuffed rabbit that enhances the intelligence of the kids playing with it.
Peter Rottentail	Rabbit	Peter Rottentail	
The Rabbit of Caerbannog	Rabbit	Monty Python and the Holy Grail	A killer rabbit. Adopted as the Vorpal Bunny into many Dungeons & Dragons scenarios.
Sundry Bunnies	Rabbit	Jean de Florette	Central to the plot.
Thumper	Rabbit	Bambi	
Trudy	Rabbit	Local Hero	
Roger Rabbit	Rabbit	Who Framed Roger Rabbit	The main character; he is falsely accused of murder.
Rudolf der Rammler	Hare	Otto – Der Film	A hare hunted and later adopted by Otto

=== Television ===
Name	Species	Origin	Notes
Assoud	Rabbit	Tomorrow's Pioneers	An aggressively anti-Semitic rabbit.
Benny Rabbit	Rabbit	Sesame Street	An irritated, grouchy rabbit who works as a bellhop at the Furry Arms Hotel.
Bedtime Bunny	Rabbit	Jim Henson's Pajanimals	A bunny with pajamas who lives in the Land of Hush
Mr. Bunny Rabbit	Rabbit	Captain Kangaroo	A puppet rabbit who does not speak. He steals carrots, and somehow causes ping pong balls to fall on the Captain's head.
Christine	Rabbit	Bear in the Big Blue House	A female gray rabbit who is Ojo's best friend
Cleo	Rabbit	Rainbow	A new blue rabbit puppet with a southern accent
Mr. Floppy	Rabbit	Unhappily Ever After	
Greg	Rabbit	Greg the Bunny	
Hartley Hare	Hare	Pipkins	
Jax	Jackrabbit	Power Rangers Beast Morphers	Zoey's Beast Bot partner
Juan Carlos Bodoque	Rabbit	31 Minutos	
Meadow	Rex rabbit	Elmo's World	A boy's pet rabbit only shown in the episode "School".
Mixy	Rabbit	The Ferals	A simple-minded, but affectionate pink rabbit and one of the four gang members of the Ferals.
Oscar	Rabbit	Oscar the Rabbit in Rubbidge, Oscar and the Great Wooferoo	A rabbit who wears a red coat and a yellow scarf. He lives in the land of Rubbidge.
Rapid T. Rabbit	Rabbit	Rapid T. Rabbit and Friends	An independently produced children's puppet show.
Willahara	Rabbit/Hare Wesen	Grimm	A group of people who woge(morphing) into rabbit-humanoid "wesen".
Zoef	Hare	De Fabeltjeskrant	A super quick hare who always mentions his own name (Zoef! Zoef!), whenever he talks. He is always in a hurry.

=== Animation ===
Name	Species	Origin	Notes
Ace Bunny	Rabbit	Loonatics Unleashed	A superhero and descendant of Bugs Bunny. Prior to gaining superpowers, Ace worked as a stuntman.
Anais Watterson	Rabbit	The Amazing World of Gumball	A pink girl rabbit main character, wearing white socks on her feet and the little sister of Gumball Watterson.
Angel	Rabbit	My Little Pony: Friendship Is Magic	Fluttershy's pet rabbit.
Angel Gabby	Hare	Angel Hare	Winged hare from an imaginary series of the same origin name. One of the few characters that is able to "break out" of the animated series and talk directly to the person watching it.
Arugula	Rabbit	Carl the Collector	
Babs Bunny	Rabbit	Tiny Toon Adventures	She co-stars frequently with Buster. She represents the crazy and maniac side of Bugs Bunny and her constant changes of attire and her imitations of fellow characters is a homage to the tendency of Bugs Bunny to disguise himself to fool other characters.
Barry Buns	Rabbit	Kiff	
Becca Sparkles	Rabbit	Talking Tom & Friends	A grey rabbit who was introduced in the Talking Tom and Friends web series. Like Angela, she is also an aspiring singer.
Beehonie	Rabbit	Kissyfur	
Bellflower Family	Rabbit	Bellflower Bunnies	The family consists of Poppy, Violette, Periwinkle, Mistletoe, Dandelion, their father Papa Bramble and their mother Aunt Zinia.
Berry	Rabbit	Whisker Haven Tales with the Palace Pets	
Bunnie	Rabbit	Harry & Bunnie	
Big Rabbit	Rabbit	The Angry Beavers	Voiced by Scott Wiel. He is a large rabbit with a New York accent. He once had an occupation as a bodyguard in the third-season premiere episode “My Bunnyguard.”
Bionic Bunny	Rabbit	Arthur	The star of Arthur and Buster's favorite show on television, The Bionic Bunny Show. The Superman of their world.
Blossom	Rabbit	Little Mouse on the Prairie	
Boingo	Rabbit	Hoodwinked!	A conniving rabbit, innocent at first sight, who is the Goodie Bandit out to steal Granny's recipes.
Bon the Dancing Rabbit	Rabbit	The Walten Files	A light blue animatronic rabbit who is one of the four Showstoppers and the main mascot of Bon's Burgers.
Bonnie	Rabbit	Five Nights at Freddy's	A purple rabbit who is one of the four animatronics in Freddy Fazbear's Pizza.
Br'er Rabbit	Rabbit	Song of the South	Featured in the film and in the popular theme park ride Splash Mountain at Disneyland
Brother Rabbit	Rabbit	Coonskin	A satirical subversion of Joel Chandler Harris and Disney's similar character from Song of the South, reimagined as an African-American.
Bucky O'Hare	Hare	Bucky O'Hare and the Toad Wars!	
Bugs Bunny	Rabbit or Hare (sometimes)	Looney Tunes & Merrie Melodies	An animated cartoon character created in the late 1930s at Leon Schlesinger Productions, division of Warner Bros.. He is an anthropomorphic gray and white rabbit with white gloves and big rabbit feet. He is one of the most beloved and recognizable cartoon characters in the world and is the mascot of Warner Bros. He won an Oscar for his Knighty Knight Bugs cartoon short in 1958, and in early 1985 he got a star on Hollywood Walk of Fame.
Buster Baxter	Rabbit	Arthur	A white anthropomorphic rabbit who is Arthur's best friend and has an obsession with aliens.
Buster Bunny	Rabbit	Tiny Toon Adventures	The main character of the show. Buster resembles the intrepid and intelligent side of Bugs Bunny, sometimes being incredibly ingenious compared to his mentor.
Bunny	Bunny	Braved Animated Series	
The Bunnies	Rabbit	Willa's Wild Life	Tons of rabbits owned by Willa that come in different bright colours. They don't speak instead squeak and giggle all the time. Willa simply refers to them as "bunny" or "the bunnies".
Buttercream Sundae	Candy Rabbit	Littlest Pet Shop	A yellow rabbit who is the owner of the candy shop
Colonel Wellington B. Bunny	Bunny	Here Comes Peter Cottontail	The retiring Chief Easter Bunny of April Valley who selects Peter Cottontail as his replacement despite noting Peter's character flaws.
Cream the Rabbit	Rabbit	Sonic the Hedgehog	
Crusader Rabbit	Rabbit	Crusader Rabbit	
Cuddles	Rabbit	Happy Tree Friends	A yellow bunny with pink cheeks who inexplicably wears pink bunny slippers. His white fluffy curly hair tuft and cotton tail look exactly the same. His ears also move to match how he feels. For example, if he is happy, they will stay up, and when he is upset, they will drop. Cuddles is one of the main characters in the series.
Dade	Rabbit	Harvey Beaks	A close friend of Harvey who also has an obsessive fondness of him, as well as disdain for his imp siblings, Fee and Foo. He is chubby-cheeked and is the oldest of his many siblings.
Daffodil	Rabbit	Clifford's Puppy Days	
Dark Bunny	Rabbit	Arthur	Bionic Bunny's dark, scary, nocturnal counterpart, comparable to Batman.
Donna	Bunny	Here Comes Peter Cottontail	A female bunny Peter meets at the Valentine's Day Party and goes skating with. She explains to Peter that she knows who he is and that everyone can make a mistake.
Dylan	Rabbit	The Magic Roundabout	A narcoleptic hippy rabbit, who plays the guitar. In the French version of The Magic Roundabout, Dylan was renamed Flappy.
E. Aster Bunnymund	Pooka	Rise of the Guardians	
E.B.	Rabbit	Hop	
Elinor	Rabbit	Elinor Wonders Why	A curious bunny who is the main character of the show.
Esquilax	Horse	"Lisa's Wedding"	A purportedly rare animal, a horse born with the head and body of a rabbit.
Floppy	Rabbit	The Adventures of the Little Koala	Roobear's best friend that wears a walkman
Gary	Rabbit	The Loud House	Luan Loud's pet rabbit. He is used for tricks like pulling a rabbit out of a hat.
Halley	Rabbit	Astroblast!	A fun-loving and caring pink rabbit who is into surfing and lives with her closest friend Comet and other friends on the Frosty Star space station smoothie diner.
Hare-ham	Hare	Monster Rancher	
Hare	Hare	Year Hare Affair	The representation of the People’s Republic of China in the cartoon. Is known for having a friendly relationship with others but is competent at fighting when needed.
Harry Buns	Rabbit	Kiff	
Haru	Rabbit	Beastars	A white Netherland Dwarf rabbit
Mr. Herriman	Rabbit	Foster's Home for Imaginary Friends	An imaginary friend who was the companion of founder Madame Foster when she was a child and now serves as Foster's head of household; is very prim, proper and strict; a stickler for rules; refers to everyone as "Master" and "Ms.", even those he dislikes, like Bloo and Goo.
Mr. Whiskers	Rabbit	Brandy & Mr. Whiskers	A silly white English Lop rabbit with a big red nose.
Hutch	Rabbit	Wallace & Gromit: The Curse of the Were-Rabbit	A rabbit who develops human speech and Wallace's personality after an experiment accident. Thought to be the were-rabbit at first.
Io	Rabbit	Jewelpet	A light brown and brown-eared Lop rabbit who symbolizes Refreshment. He wears a purple bow tie.
Iyo	Rabbit	Animal Yokochō	
Jack Bunny	Rabbit	Merrie Melodies	A rabbit spoof of Jack Benny, from three shorts, Goofy Groceries, I Love to Singa and Slap-Happy Pappy.
January Q. Irontail	Rabbit	Here Comes Peter Cottontail, Here Comes Peter Cottontail: The Movie	
Jax	Jackrabbit	The Amazing Digital Circus	An avatar in virtual reality world
Jumpy Ghostface	Rabbit	Hero: 108	
Judy Hopps	Rabbit	Zootopia	A European rabbit from Bunnyburrow who is a newly appointed member of the Zootopia Police Department.
Kanoko	Rabbit	Sweet Valerian	
Kate	Rabbit	Sweet Valerian	
Kiko	Rabbit	Winx Club	Bloom's blue furred pet rabbit and companion.
King Kazma	Rabbit	Summer Wars	The virtual avatar for Kazuma Ikezawa. Depicted as a towering anthropomorphic white rabbit, he is seen wearing a red vest, blue jeans, and a pair of tailor-made shoes. Kazma also dons a pair of goggles on his head, and white-and-red fingerless gloves with two large bracelets covering his wrists and hands. A golden belt inlaid with blue stones wraps around his waist. Kazma has another form that makes him appear similarly to that of his creator, Kazuma Ikezawa. In his second form, he sports lengthy, bushy yellow hair. Kazma dons gray sweatpants with a dark gray cloth belt, is barefoot, and his goggles are worn around his neck.
Kirineko, Putin, Zrzolov, Mechanenko, Boris, Jiriya, often rabbits	Rabbit	Usavich	
Kockásfülű nyúl	Rabbit	Kockásfülű nyúl	
Krash (Russian: Крош, romanized: Krosh)	Rabbit	KikoRiki	
Leonardo da Bittersweet	Bunny	Here Comes Peter Cottontail	A cameo character in the Rankin/Bass special, one of two famous chocolate carvers in April Valley. The character is briefly seen carving a chocolate cross. The name is an obvious take on Leonardo da Vinci.
Lexi Bunny	Rabbit	Loonatics Unleashed	Lola Bunny's descendant
Lucky Jack	Jackrabbit	Home on the Range	A peg-legged jackrabbit who helps Maggie, Grace and Mrs. Calloway stop Alameda Slim.
Lucky Seven Sampson	Rabbit	Schoolhouse Rock!	A carefree rabbit teaching kids the multiples of 7.
Lola Bunny	Rabbit	Space Jam	Bugs Bunny's significant other.
Luea	Rabbit	Jewelpet	A black and white Dutch rabbit who symbolizes Truth. She wears an indigo butterfly hairpin on her left ear and a garland made of indigo roses.
Luna	Rabbit	Jewelpet	A pink and yellow Netherland Dwarf rabbit who symbolizes Charm improvement. She wears a blue bow on her head and a necklace shaped like a blue crescent moon.
Mary Buns	Rabbit	Kiff	
Max	Rabbit	The Adventures of Sam & Max: Freelance Police	A 'hyperkinetic rabbity thing' that works for the Freelance Police.
Max	Bunny	Max & Ruby	Ruby's younger brother.
Max Hare	Hare	The Tortoise and the Hare	A cocky, athletic, and incredibly fast rabbit.
Mildred McCallister	Rabbit	Summer Camp Island	Susie's younger sister who has overactive magical glands.
Mimi	Rabbit	The Adventures of the Little Koala	Floppy's younger sister
Mimirin Midorihara	Rabbit	Shima Shima Tora no Shimajirou	One of the four main characters. She is a sweet and kind rabbit who loves dolls and flowers.
Momiji Sohma	Rabbit (cursed human)	Fruits Basket	A boy cursed to turn into a rabbit whenever he is touched by a female.
Mother Rabbit	Rabbit	Robin Hood	A kind rabbit, and the mother of Skippy, Sis, Tagalong and 14 others.
My Melody, Kuromi	Rabbit	Onegai My Melody	
Nico	Rabbit	Carl the Collector	
No. 1 and No. 6	Rabbit	Bionic Max	These rabbits try to capture Max and take him back to the lab.
Ollie	Rabbit	Wonder Pets!	The newest member of the team who wears a knight's helmet
Oswald	Rabbit	Oswald the Lucky Rabbit	
Patty Rabbit	Rabbit	Maple Town	
Pop	Rabbit	Sweet Valerian	
Rabbit	Rabbit	My Friend Rabbit	A giving and adventurous rabbit who is one of the show's main protagonists.
Rabbit	Rabbit	Skunk Fu!	
Rabbit	Rabbit	The Many Adventures of Winnie the Pooh	A yellow rabbit, and a good friend of Winnie the Pooh, Christopher Robin, Eeyore, Owl, Kanga, Roo, Gopher, Piglet, and Tigger.
Rabbit	Rabbit	The Rescuers	One of Ellie Mae's and Luke's neighbors.
Miss Rabbit	Rabbit	Peppa Pig	The aunt of Rebecca Rabbit. Miss Rabbit does many jobs.
Rabirin	Rabbit	Healin' Good Pretty Cure	
Raggles	Rabbit	Everything's Rosie	Blue rabbit who is Rosie's best friend.
Rancid Rabbit	Rabbit	CatDog	
Randy Rabbit	Rabbit	Garfield Gets Real	
Rapid Rabbit	Rabbit	Looney Tunes (Quick Brown Fox and Rapid Rabbit)	
Rebecca Rabbit	Rabbit	Peppa Pig	One of Peppa's friends.
Rekkit	Rabbit	Rekkit Rabbit	A gigantic rabbit with an orange stars on his cheeks and a big fluffy orange tail.
Richard Watterson	Rabbit	The Amazing World of Gumball	Husband of Nicole, father of Gumball and Anais, adopted father of Darwin.
Ricochet Rabbit	Rabbit	Ricochet Rabbit & Droop-a-Long	
Robert	Rabbit	The Adventures of the American Rabbit	
Rosie	Rabbit	Paboo & Mojies	A white girl rabbit who wears a rainbow colored bow on her head and is the best friend of Paboo the panda.
Roger Rabbit	White rabbit	Who Framed Roger Rabbit	A cartoon film star in Hollywood.
Ruby	Hare	Jewelpet	A white Japanese hare who symbolizes Lucky. She wears a pink and red cherry blossom flower on her left ear and a pink necklace shaped like a pair of red cherries. She is one of the three main characters of the series.
Ruby	Bunny	Max & Ruby	Max's older sister.
Samson	Rabbit	Monica and Friends	A blue rabbit who is Monica's stuffed animal.
Scamper McRabbit	Hare	Manga Aesop's Fables	
Shirousa and Kurousa	Rabbit	Sugarbunnies	A group of twin bunnies, who each serve roles with pastry-related things. If anyone eats what they make, they become happy.
Snowball	Rabbit	The Secret Life of Pets	A white rabbit who is the leader of The Flushed Pets.
Sis Rabbit	Rabbit	Robin Hood	Skippy's eldest sister that wears a red dress, and a large pink bow on her head.
Skipper and Bluebell	Rabbit	Chucklewood Critters	
Skippy Rabbit	Rabbit	Robin Hood	A seven year old rabbit, who wants to be like his role model and idol, Robin Hood.
Squint	Palaeolagus	Ice Age: Continental Drift	A prehistoric Palaeolagus-like rabbit and a member of Captain Gutt's crew.
Stampy	Rabbit	Super Life-Form Transformers: Beast Wars Neo	
Swift Heart Rabbit	Rabbit	Care Bears	One of the Care Bear Cousins. She has blue fur and her tummy symbol is a pink or red heart with white or pale blue wings.
Terri Buns	Rabbit	Kiff	
Thumper	Rabbit	Bambi	Bambi and Flower's best friend.
Tippy	Angora rabbit	Is the Order a Rabbit?	
Tuzki	Rabbit	Tuzki	
Tweak	Bunny	The Octonauts	A green bunny who is the Octonauts' engineer.
Untalkative Bunny	Rabbit	Untalkative Bunny	
Usahara	Rabbit	Damekko Dōbutsu	An aggressive, chain-smoking rabbit.
Usahime	Rabbit	Kyatto Ninden Teyandee	
Usajii	Rabbit	Domo	An elderly rabbit.
Ushagi-san	Rabbit	Kobato.	The messenger of God who takes the form of a silent plush rabbit with wings and carries messages in the form of a flower.
Mr. Whiskers	Rabbit	Brandy & Mr. Whiskers	
White Rabbit	Rabbit	Devil May Cry	An anthropomorphic rabbit demon, voiced by Hoon Lee.
Widget	Rabbit	Wow! Wow! Wubbzy!	
Yin and Yang	Rabbit	Yin Yang Yo!	Crimefighting rabbits trained by a panda named Master Yo.
Yoyo	Rabbit	Hoops & Yoyo	A green rabbit. He is excitable and prone to mistakes.
Yuichi Usagi	Rabbit	Samurai Rabbit: The Usagi Chronicles	A descendant of Miyamoto Usagi and lead protagonist of the series.
Yukimaru	Rabbit	Fortune Arterial	
Zayats	Hare	Nu, pogodi!	The positive hero of the series, often the target of his nemesis, Wolf (or, transliterated, Volk) and his mischievous actions. His character is not really developed in personality or playing active roles until the later seasons.
Zombunny	Rabbit	Dr. Zitbag's Transylvania Pet Shop	A dumb, motionless rabbit.

== Video games ==
Name	Species	Origin	System(s)	Notes
Alice	Human (Rabbit Zoanthrope)	Bloody Roar	Arcade, PlayStation, PlayStation 2, GameCube, Xbox	Can shift into a half-human half-animal form during combat.
Amber	Rabbit	Armello	Windows, macOS, Linux, iOS	Chosen hero of the Rabbit clan and treasure-seeker. She is armed with a short sword and parasol.
Arina Makihara	Bunny	Waku Waku 7	Arcade, Nintendo Switch, Xbox One, PlayStation 4	A playable 14-year old teen character. She's also associated with the orange Waku Waku ball, making her a citrine.
Baby O'Hara	Hare (transformed human)	Jitsu Squad	Windows, Nintendo Switch, PlayStation 4, PlayStation 5, Xbox One, Xbox Series X/S	
Badd Bunny	Rabbit	The Radioactive Chicken Heads in: Badd Bunny Breakout	Windows	A normal rabbit mutated into a ten-ton beast by radiation. Badd Bunny is the primary antagonist in the fictional backstory for the comedy punk band The Radioactive Chicken Heads, and regularly appears as part of their stage shows.
Bangboo	Rabbit-Like Robot	Zenless Zone Zero	Windows, iOS, Android, PlayStation 5, Xbox Series X|S	
Barnaby Screwloose	Rabbit	Armello	Windows, macOS, Linux, iOS	From the Rabbit Clan he is a tinkerer that swaps items at will, making him highly adaptable to any situation.
Bianca	Rabbit	Spyro: Year of the Dragon	PlayStation	An apprentice magician who wears a maroon cape. She works for the Sorceress and steals dragon eggs, but after realising she will kill the hatchlings, defects to help Spyro.
Bonnie the Rabbit	Animatronic rabbit	Five Nights at Freddy's	Windows, iOS, Android	A lavender colored animatronic rabbit, in which you must fend off in order to survive the night shift at the fictional family restaurant known as Freddy Fazbear's Pizza.
Boxers	Bunny	The Bunny Graveyard	Windows, Nintendo Switch	An anthropomorphic friendly bunny who wears a quilted long-sleeve shirt, and a pair of shorts and socks. He is seen wearing a smiling cutout cardboard box over his head, and runs a secret underground hideout beneath Skye's Lovely Garden. Voiced by Jason Norris.
Bunston (Rampa)	Rabbit	The Legendary Starfy	Nintendo DS	
Bunzo Bunny	Bunny	Poppy Playtime	Windows, iOS, Android	
Clive	Rabbit	Clive 'N' Wrench	Windows, Nintendo Switch, PlayStation 4, PlayStation 5	An anthropomorphic male rabbit. Titular hero alongside his monkey partner, Wrench. Clive is seen wearing a red vest, a yellow cap, and a pair of blue pants with a belt buckle.
Cream the Rabbit	Rabbit	Sonic Advance 2	Game Boy Advance	An anthropomorphic, six-year-old rabbit who lives with her mother Vanilla and her Chao, Cheese.
Elyssia	Rabbit	Armello	Windows, macOS, Linux, iOS	Wardress of Warrens, Elyssia fortifies settlements she ends her turn on by erecting walls.
Eva Earlong	Jackrabbit	Jazz Jackrabbit	MS-DOS	The Princess of the planet Carrotus.
Fluffy Fluffy Bun Bun	Rabbit	Toonstruck	MS-DOS, Windows, Mac	The sugar-sweet rabbit of Cutopia, whose job is to be the 'cutest rabbit in the whole wide world'. However, she is not all that she seems to be. Voiced by Tress MacNeille.
Gardener Skye	Bunny	The Bunny Graveyard	Windows, Nintendo Switch	An anthropomorphic female bunny gardener who leads a group of cursors named Handy Pals. She is voiced by Courtney Chu.
Guggimon	Rabbit	Fortnite	Multiple	An anthropomorphic male rabbit skin. He wears a black shirt, white gloves, and purple pants with a belt buckle.
Harvey	Stuffed Rabbit	Edna & Harvey: The Breakout	Windows, macOS, Linux	A pyromaniac stuffed rabbit who helps his owner Edna.
Hikaru and Akane	Rabbit Girl	Parodius	SNES, Sega Saturn, PlayStation	
Hoppy Hopscotch	Rabbit	Poppy Playtime	Multiple	A green rabbit who is one of the Smiling Critters. Her pendant is a Lightingbolt.
Hopsalot	Rabbit	JumpStart Kindergarten	Windows, Mac	Also called Mr. Hopsalot and Hops.
Jazz Jackrabbit	Jackrabbit	Jazz Jackrabbit	MS-DOS	A green space jackrabbit who wears a red bandana and is armed with an LFG9000.
Kung Fu Bunny	Rabbit	Brutal: Paws of Fury	Mega Drive/Genesis, SNES, Amiga, Amiga CD32, Sega Man-CD, MS-DOS, 32X	
Lori Jackrabbit	Jackrabbit	Jazz Jackrabbit 2: The Secret Files	Windows, classic Mac OS	
Lucky	Rabbit	Dark Deception	Windows	The leader of the Joy Joy Gang.
Max	Rabbit	Sam & Max	Multiple	A 'hyperkinetic rabbity thing' that works for the Freelance Police.
MIPS	Rabbit	Super Mario 64	Nintendo 64	A golden rabbit found in the castle's basement. Named after the Nintendo 64's CPU type.
Mimi	Rabbit	Pop'N Music		A long pigtailed haired rabbit who is a friend of Nyami.
Miyamoto Usagi	Rabbit	Samurai Warrior: The Battles of Usagi Yojimbo	Amstrad CPC, Commodore 64, ZX Spectrum	
Monomi	Rabbit	Danganronpa 2: Goodbye Despair	Windows, PlayStation Portable, PlayStation Vita, PlayStation 4	Monomi is a rabbit magical girl who features as the mascot character of Danganronpa 2: Goodbye Despair, appearing in the game as the lead teacher of the school trip.
Nabbit	Rabbit	New Super Mario Bros. U, New Super Luigi U	Wii U	A purple thief who steals the player's power-ups occasionally. Nabbit is one of the protagonists in New Super Luigi U.
Nice Cream Guy	Rabbit-Like Monster	Undertale	Windows, macOS, Linux, PlayStation 4, PlayStation Vita, Nintendo Switch	A Vendor that sells Nice Cream at various locations. He is friends with Burgerpants.
Panne	Taguel	Fire Emblem Awakening	Nintendo 3DS	Yarne's mother.
Queen Earlong	Rabbit	Jazz Jackrabbit	Windows, classic Mac OS	Mother of Eva Earlong, and queen of the fictional planet Carrotus.
Rabite / Rabi	Rabbit-like Creature	Secret of Mana	SNES, FOMA 903i/703i, Virtual Console, Android	The Rabite resembles a bodiless, one-toothed rabbit with large ears that curve upward and form a point at the tip, and a round, puffy pink tail that moves by hopping along the ground.
Reader Rabbit	Rabbit	Reader Rabbit	Apple II, MS-DOS, Mac	A greyish blue rabbit.
Redmond	Rabbit	Whiplash	PlayStation 2, Xbox	Serves as Spanx's weapon and tool in the gameplay and as a result, complains a lot.
Peppy Hare	Hare	Star Fox series	Multiple	Pilot of the Great Fox spacecraft and former member of the Star Fox team.
Rabbids	Rabbit	Rayman Raving Rabbids	Game Boy Advance, Xbox 360, Wii, PlayStation 2, Windows, Nintendo DS	Large mischievous crazy rabbits who like causing trouble and yell "BWAAAH!" whenever they experience adrenaline rushes.
Rascal	Rabbit	Seal Online	Windows	
Reisen Udongein Inaba	Rabbit	Imperishable Night (Touhou Project)	Windows	A Lunar rabbit Youkai and a boss. Has the ability to manipulate waves, such as brain waves.
Ringo	Rabbit	Legacy of Lunatic Kingdom (Touhou Project)	Windows	A mochi making lunar rabbit and member of the "eagle ravi" group. Also a boss in the game. Business rival of Seiran.
Seiran	Rabbit	Legacy of Lunatic Kingdom (Touhou Project)	Windows	A mochi making lunar rabbit and member of the "eagle ravi" group. Also a boss in the game. Business rival of Ringo.
Shara	Viera	Final Fantasy Tactics Advance	Game Boy Advance	Shara is an archer/sniper and member of the Viera, a rabbit-like people with long ears and supple limbs. She is the partner of Ritz Malheur, who has access to all the equipment and weapons of the Viera. Not much is known about her past, but she convinces Ritz to keep her natural white hair, which she is ashamed of, saying that white hair is considered a blessing among the Viera. Shara has primarily high Attack and speed but low HP and MP, and she uses the special ability Sharpshoot.
Skivvy	Rabbit	Banjo-Tooie	Nintendo 64, Xbox 360 (Xbox Live Arcade), Xbox One	Secondary characters (seven in total) in the "Grunty's Industries" world, when the protagonists must wash their clothes to get a Jiggy.
Social Bunny, The	Rabbit	The Sims 3	Windows, PlayStation 3, PlayStation 4, Xbox	The Social Bunny appears as a kind of mirage that only one Sim can see (if you switch characters, your other Sim will not see it unless their social requirement is at its lowest). The Social Bunny appears when your Sim's social requirement is at its lowest. It does this in order to boost the Sim's social need.
Spaz Jackrabbit	Jackrabbit	Jazz Jackrabbit 2	Windows, classic Mac OS	
Springtrap	Rabbit	Five Nights at Freddy's 3	Windows, Nintendo Switch, PlayStation 4, PlayStation 5, Xbox One, Xbox Series X/S, Stadia, iOS, Android	The main antagonist.
Subject 3	Rabbit	Professor Layton and the Unwound Future	Nintendo 3Ds, Nintendo DS, iOS, Android	Separated with his parents since birth, he was taken in by a lab to serve as a test subject.
Super Bunny	Rabbit	Super Bunny	Apple II, Atari 8-bit, Commodore 64	Non-superhero form is known as Reginald Rabbit
Tewi Inaba	Rabbit	Imperishable Night (Touhou Project)		The Rabbit of Good Fortune. See also Hare of Inaba.
Turner	Rabbit	Lugaru	AmigaOS 4, AROS, Linux, Windows, macOS	A rabbit warrior who sets on a quest for revenge against "The Raiders".
Vanilla the Rabbit	Rabbit	Sonic Advance 2	Game Boy Advance	Cream's mother.
Vibri	Rabbit	Vib-Ribbon	PlayStation	A white, minimalised, vector-lined rabbit.
Yarne	Taguel	Fire Emblem Awakening	Nintendo 3DS	Panne's son from the future.
Yumigami	Celestial brush god	Ōkami	PlayStation 2, Wii	Yumigami (弓神?; God of the Bow) is the Celestial brush god of the moon. She is depicted as a rabbit with a mochi-pounding mallet, and her constellation is found in Agata Forest after saving Ume from Whopper.
Zero III / Lagomorph	Virtual Rabbit AI	Zero Escape: Virtue's Last Reward	Nintendo 3DS, PlayStation Vita, Windows, PlayStation 4	Zero III ("Zero the Third") is an artificial intelligence anthropomorphized as a white rabbit in traditional Chinese wear. He explains the rules of the Nonary Game and taunts the participants.
Zipper T. Bunny	Rabbit	Animal Crossing series	Multiple	A yellow anthropomorphic rabbit based on the Easter Bunny, sending players to search for eggs on the in-game holiday Bunny Day. He first appears in Animal Crossing: City Folk.

== Advertising mascots ==
- Bernie, the Annie's brand mascot
- The Cadbury's Caramel Bunny
- Dr. Rabbit, a dentist character created by Colgate
- Duracell Bunny
- Energizer Bunny
- Glenda, the Plan 9 Bunny
- Gus Honeybun
- Hip Hop
- Nesquik bunny
- Noid
- The Playboy Bunny
- The Trix rabbit
- Jive Bunny, the face of the UK chart-topping novelty pop music act Jive Bunny and the Mastermixers
- Buck the GameStop Bunny mascot
- Carl, the Blockbuster rabbit

== Fantasy ==
=== Mythology and folklore ===
- Cabbit
- The Easter Bunny
- Hare of Inaba
- Hare in one of Aesop's Fables, The Hare and the Tortoise
- The Moon Rabbit, China, Korea, Japan.
- Nanabhozo or Mahnabohzo, rabbit god of many Amerindian tribes
- The rabbit taken to the Moon by Quetzalcoatl, Aztec deity
- Rabbits, of Chinese zodiac year

=== Fictional hybrid species ===
- Cabbit
- Jackalope
- Skvader
- Wererabbit
- Wolpertinger

== Others ==
- Lulla, a stuffed bowtie blue from Suzy's Zoo

== See also ==
- Lists of fictional animals
  - List of miscellaneous fictional animals
- Moon gazing hare
- Rabbits in the arts
- Rabbits in culture and literature
- Three hares
