= Phoebe Erickson =

American children's book illustrator

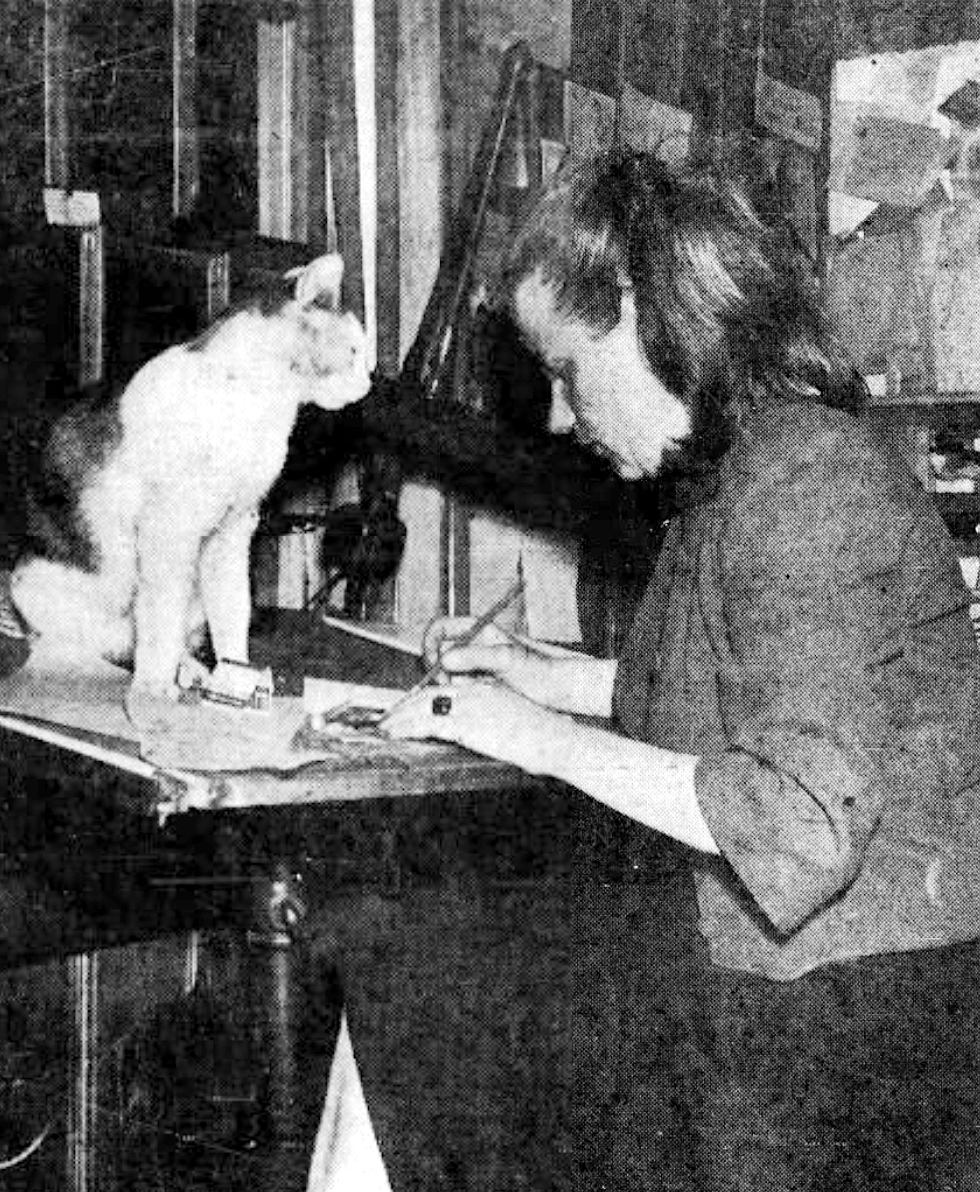
- Erickson working in her Hartford, Connecticut studio in 1952.
- Born: November 23, 1907; North Bay, Wisconsin, US
- Died: August 23, 2006 (aged 98); Concord, New Hampshire, US
- Resting place: Bailey's Harbor, Wisconsin, US; 45.0693°N 87.1461°E
- Education: School of the Art Institute of Chicago, Columbia University
- Occupations: Author and illustrator

Phoebe Erickson (1907–2006) was a children's book illustrator and author who is best remembered for her accurate depictions of wildlife and the natural world.

== Personal life and education ==
Phoebe Erickson was born on November 23, 1907, in North Bay, Wisconsin, the twelfth of Swedish immigrants Axel and Emelia Erickson's eventual thirteen children. She grew up on the family farm in Door County surrounded by animals and nature, something she later credited with greatly impacting the direction of her artistic career. In a 1952 interview with the Hartford Courant titled Children Find Charm in Phoebe Erickson's Yarns and Drawings, Phoebe described her childhood as follows:

"I drew pictures even before I started to read. My father bought some paper but I used it up in no time. So then I went out in the woods and cut some birchbark and covered that with drawings. It was fun to be behind the big kitchen stove on a rainy day and draw pictures of cowboys and indians, ponies and broncos. At that time in my life I had three ambitions: to be an artist, a poet, and a cowboy."

After finishing eight years of local schooling, Erickson graduated from Bailey's Harbor School in 1921. She moved to Chicago to further her education by studying painting and design at the Art Institute of Chicago as a scholarship student from 1931 to 1933. In 1937, she again moved to New York where she would eventually attend Columbia University. Phoebe soon met trial lawyer Arthur Blair, and the two were later married in the Marble Collegiate Church. Despite their marriage, Phoebe continued to publish books using her maiden name for the entirety of her career.

Erickson and her husband spent their retirement restoring old homes in Spain and Sweden, before finally settling in New England. Phoebe Erickson died at her home in Concord, New Hampshire, on August 23, 2006, at the age of 98. She is buried near her hometown in Bailey's Harbor, Wisconsin.

== Career ==
While attending the Art Institute of Chicago, Phoebe Erickson worked as a freelance illustrator for greeting card and playing card companies. One of the designs she created for the Arrco Playing Card Company, featuring two fawns in a forest, eventually caught the eye of a publisher at Children's Press and she was soon invited to write and illustrate an original children's book about foxes. Erickson's first book, Slip: The Story of a Little Fox, was subsequently published by Children's Press in 1948. Erickson began illustrating children's books full-time soon after, when she moved to New York City to attend Columbia University.

In addition to writing over a dozen original children's books, Erickson was frequently employed as an illustrator by other children's authors. In 1950, she was invited to illustrate the American edition of the sequel to Felix Salten's Bambi. She regularly collaborated with Thornton Burgess, a conservationist and prolific author of stories for children through the 1950s.

=== Awards ===
In 1957, Erickson's original book Daniel 'Coon: The Story of a Pet Raccoon won the William Allen White Children's Book Award. She became the fifth recipient of what is now recognized as the oldest children's choice book award in the United States at a ceremony held at the College of Emporia in Kansas City, Kansas, on October 10, 1957. In 1960, her book Double or Nothing was the fourth book selected as the winner of the Dorothy Canfield Fisher Children's Book Award, now known as the Vermont Golden Dome Book Award.

In 1948, one of Erickson's watercolor illustrations was featured in the Whitney Museum of American Art's Annual Exhibition of Contemporary American Sculpture, Watercolors, and Drawings.

=== Collections ===
Phoebe Erickson's books continue to be held in numerous libraries and museums around the world. In 1954, she sent autographed copies of each of her books accompanied by some of her original drawings and paintings to the library she frequented in her childhood in Bailey's Harbor. She later praised the library in an interview given more than a decade later, saying "Much of my early education I owe to my parents, the rest to the public library."

The University of Minnesota maintains the Phoebe Erickson Collection of original sketches, illustrations, and production materials from 23 of Erickson's titles published between 1946 and 1966.

- National Trust Museum of Childhood, Sudbury Hall, Derbyshire, UK.\
- Thornton W. Burgess Museum, Sandwich, Massachusetts.
- Miller Art Museum, Sturgeon Bay, Wisconsin.
- Phoebe Erickson Room, Bailey's Harbor Library, Bailey's Harbor, Wisconsin.
- Phoebe Erickson Collection, Elmer Andersen Library, University of Minnesota, Minneapolis, Minnesota.
- Phoebe Erickson Papers, de Grummond Children's Literature Collection, University of Southern Mississippi, Hattiesburg, Mississippi.

Children's Books Illustrated by Phoebe Erickson
Title	Author	Publisher	Year of Publication
Animals of Small Pond	Phoebe Erickson	Chicago Press	1960
Baby Animal Friends	Phoebe Erickson	Grosset & Dunlap	1954
Baby Animal Stories	Thornton Burgess	Grosset & Dunlap	1949
Bambi's Children	Felix Salten	Random House	1950
Black Beauty (Revised Ed.)	Anna Sewell	Random House	1949
Black Penny	Phoebe Erickson	Alfred A. Knopf	1951
Cattail House	Phoebe Erickson	Children's Press	1962
Daniel 'Coon: The Story of a Pet Racoon	Phoebe Erickson	Alfred A. Knopf	1954
Double or Nothing	Phoebe Erickson	Harper	1958
Holiday Storybook		Thomas Y. Crowell Co.	1952
Just Follow Me	Phoebe Erickson	Follett Publishing Co.	1960
Little Peter Cottontail	Thornton Burgess	Grosset & Dunlap	1956
Nature Almanac	Thornton Burgess	Grosset & Dunlap	1949
Peter Rabbit, Henny Penny, The City Mouse and the Country Mouse	Beatrix Potter	Grosset & Dunlap	1947
Seashells	Ruth H. Dudley	Thomas Y. Crowell Co.	1953
Slip, The Story of a Little Fox	Phoebe Erickson	Children's Press	1948
Stories Around the Year	Thornton Burgess	Grosset & Dunlap	1955
The Adventures of Peter Cottontail	Thornton W. Burgess	Grosset & Dunlap	1958
The Littlest Reindeer	Johanna DeWitt	Children's Press	1946
The Uncle Wiggly Book	Thornton W. Burgess	Grosset & Dunlap	1955
Uncle Debunkel; or, The Barely Believable Bears	Phoebe Erickson	Alfred A. Knopf	1964
We Are Neighbors	Odille Ousley	Ginn and Company	1957
Who's in the Mirror?	Phoebe Erickson	Alfred A. Knopf	1965
Wildwing	Phoebe Erickson	Harper	1959
