= Mel-O-Toons =

Public domain animated series

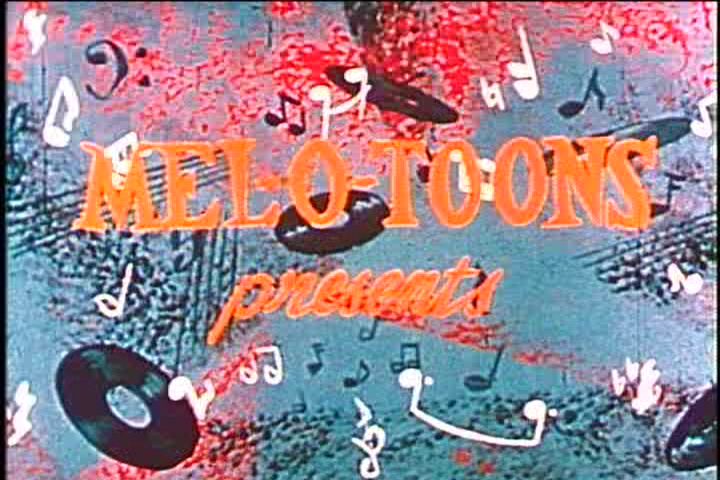
- Opening sequence
- Voices of: Daws Butler; Norman Rose; Patrick McGeehan; Ralph Camargo; Paul DeWitt; Ed Herlihy
- Country of origin: United States
- Original language: English
- No. of episodes: 104

Production
- Running time: Around 5–7 minutes
- Production companies: New World Productions; United Artists Television

Original release
- Network: Syndication
- Release: 1959 – October 1960

Mel-O-Toons (sometimes erroneously spelled Mello Toons) was a series of six-minute animated cartoons, using limited animation. The cartoons were produced starting in 1959 by New World Productions, and syndicated by United Artists.

== Content ==
The stories featured various folk tales, Greco-Roman myths, Biblical stories, classic literary adaptations, and adaptations of classical music and ballet, as well as stories about animals written by Thornton Burgess.

The soundtracks were often taken from existing children's records, licensed from the original labels, including RCA Records and Capitol Records. 104 cartoons were produced.

== Audience response ==
In October 1960, United Artists bought time on a station in Toledo, Ohio, to test the Mel-O-Toons for audience response; they showed two of the films, "Rumplestiltskin" and "Waltz of the Flowers". Variety reported that the viewer response was entirely positive, saying, "Many parents compared the Mel-O-Toons favorable to what they called the usual violence in kiddie programming."

A week later, UA bought a full-page ad in Variety, announcing: "We passed the test in Toledo!" The ad described the test: "Here's what happened: Two of these new cartoons were shown in a fifteen-minute on-the-air audition over WSPD-TV. Viewers were asked to send in their opinions, with no prizes or incentives of any kind. In less than a week, over 400 replies arrived. All except five individuals were wildly enthusiastic."

== Partial list of adapted works or stories ==
- The Adventures of Paddy the Beaver
- Aladdin
- Ali Baba
- Buffalo Bill
- Casper The Curious Kitten
- Christopher Columbus
- Cinderella
- Daniel Boone
- David and Goliath
- Diana and the Golden Apples
- Dinky Pinky
- El Torito
- The Enchanted Horse
- Endymion and Selene
- Flying Carpet
- Fun on a Rainy Day
- Gosomer Wump
- Hansel and Gretel
- Haydn's Toy Symphony
- Hiawatha
- Hunters of the Sea
- I Wish I Had
- Knights of Old
- Little Hawk
- Little Johnny Everything
- Little Sambo
- Miguel the Mighty Matador
- Noah's Ark
- Omicron and the Sputnik
- Panchito
- Paul Bunyan
- Peer Gynt's Adventures in Arabia
- Peer Gynt in the Hall of the Mountain King
- Peer Gynt in the Stormy Sea
- Peppy Possum
- Peter and the Wolf
- Peter Cottontail
- Pinocchio
- Robin Hood
- Rumplestiltskin
- Sinbad
- Sir Lancelot
- Sleeping Beauty
- Snow White
- Sparky's Magic Echo
- The Eagle and the Thrush
- The Emperor's Nightingale
- The King's Trumpet
- The Magic Clock
- The Red Shoes
- The Seasons
- The Trojan Horse
- Tom Sawyer
- Treasure Island
- Waltz of the Flowers
- War and Peace

== Public domain prints ==
After many years out of circulation, public domain prints have turned up on videotape and DVD.

== In popular culture ==
Footage from the Christopher Columbus episode was used in Last Week Tonight's "How Is This Still a Thing" segment on Columbus Day, which aired on October 12, 2014.
