= The Adventures of Danny Meadow Mouse =

1915 novel by Thornton W. Burgess

- First edition
- Author: Thornton W. Burgess
- Illustrator: Harrison Cady
- Genre: Children's fiction
- Publisher: Little, Brown and Company; Dover Publications
- Publication date: 1915
- ISBN: 978-0-486-27565-9
- OCLC: 26929223
- LC Class: PZ7.B917 Abd 1993

The Adventures of Danny Meadow Mouse (1915) is a children's novel written by Thornton W. Burgess and illustrated by Harrison Cady. Danny Meadow Mouse appeared as the main character of many tales written by Burgess for his syndicated newspaper column "Bedtime Stories".

== Plot ==
Danny begins his tale regretting the length of his tail until he is corrected by Mr. Toad. Then he has a series of stalkings by Reddy and Granny Fox. He is captured by Hooty the Owl and escapes mid-flight to Peter Rabbit's briar patch. Peter goes to Farmer Brown's peach orchard and gets caught in a snare and barely escapes himself. Finally Danny gets trapped in a tin can and must use his wits to escape Reddy Fox again.
