= Thornton W. Burgess House =

Historic house in Massachusetts, United States

- U.S. National Register of Historic Places
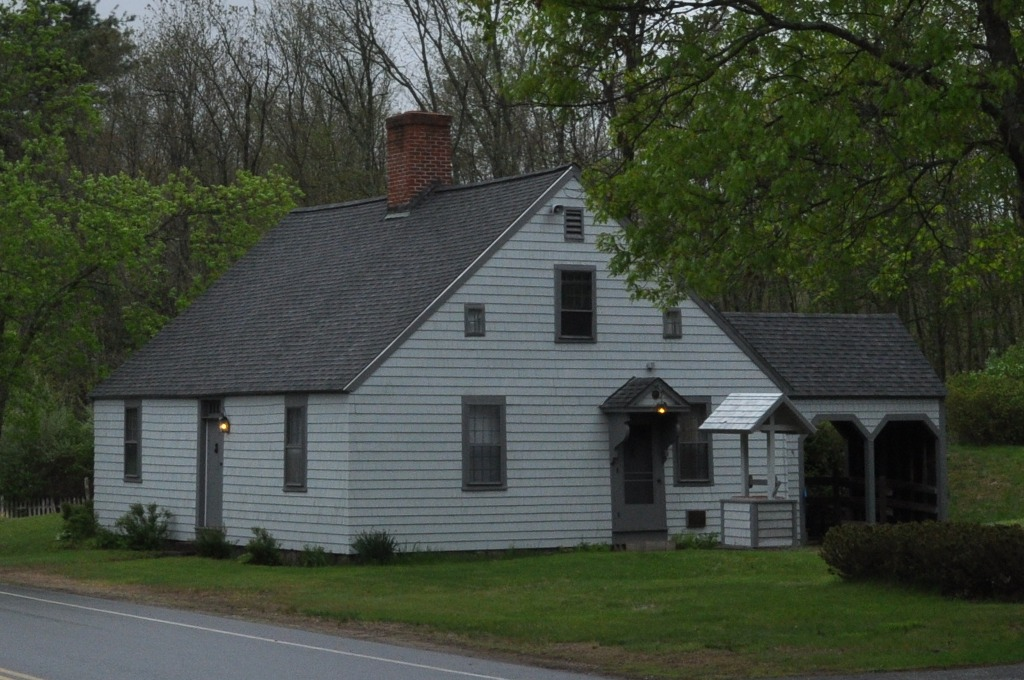

- Location within Massachusetts Location within the United States
- Location: Hampden, Massachusetts
- Coordinates: 42°3′48″N 72°24′24″W
- Area: 18 acres (7.3 ha)
- Built: 1780
- Architect: Calvin Stebbins
- NRHP reference No.: 83000740
- Added to NRHP: April 21, 1983

The Thornton W. Burgess House is a historic house at 789 Main Street in Hampden, Massachusetts. Built between 1780 and 1784, it is a well-preserved vernacular house built by one of the area's early settlers, and was for many years home to children's author Thornton W. Burgess. The property is now owned by the Massachusetts Audubon Society, which uses it for staff housing. It is adjacent to the Society's Laughing Brook Wildlife Sanctuary. It was listed on the National Register of Historic Places in 1983.

== Description and history ==
The Thornton W. Burgess House is located east of the village center of Hampden, on the north side of Main Street a short way west of its junction with Glendale Road. It is a simple 1 1/2-story Cape style house, with a side gable roof, shingled exterior, and central chimney. The main facade is three bays wide, with a central entrance topped by a transom window. Interior features include a narrow winding staircase in the entry vestibule, and a large fireplace with beehive oven in the main chamber. Some interior doors consist of wide wooden boards attached to hand wrought iron hinges.

The house is one of the oldest houses in Hampden (built between 1780 and 1784), and is noted as the longtime home of children's author Thornton Burgess. It was built by Calvin Stebbins, whose uncle was one of Hampden's first settlers. Thornton Burgess purchased the house in 1928, and used it has a summer residence until 1955, when he made it his year-round residence. He established his writing studio in one of the outbuildings on the property, and produced many of his best-known works here. After his death in 1965, the local Lions Club bought the property to prevent its development, and eventually turned it over to the Audubon Society.

== See also ==
- National Register of Historic Places listings in Hampden County, Massachusetts
