= Jazbo Brown =

Black delta blues musician from around the turn of the 20th century

- Born: U.S.
- Died: 20th-century U.S.
- Occupation: Delta blues musician

Jazbo Brown was, according to legend, a black delta blues musician from around the transition of the 19th into the 20th century.

== Biography ==
Jazbo Brown is semi-legendary, referred to in DuBose Heyward's Jasbo Brown and Selected Poems (1924) as an "itinerant negro player along the Mississippi and later in Chicago cabarets". This book also states that the jazz music genre has possibly taken its name from this travelling musician. Jazbo Brown is featured in the song "Jazzbo Brown from Memphis Town", composed by George Brooks and recorded by Bessie Smith in May 1926.

He also appears in the opening scene of George Gershwin's opera, Porgy and Bess, with the spelling 'Jasbo Brown'. He takes no part in the plot, but plays "a low-down blues" on the piano while couples dance. This goes on for several minutes, expanding as the chorus and orchestra join in, before transitioning into the song "Summertime".

== See also ==
- Al "Jazzbo" Collins
