= Super Bunny =

1983 video game

- Publisher: Datamost
- Designer: Vic Leone
- Programmers: Apple II; Vic Leone; Commodore 64; Jay Ford
- Platforms: Apple II, Atari 8-bit, Commodore 64
- Release: 1983: Apple; 1984: Atari, C64
- Genre: Platform
- Mode: Single-player

Super Bunny is a platform game written by Vic Leone for the Apple II and published by Datamost in 1983. Ports to the Atari 8-bit computers and Commodore 64 followed in 1984.

== Gameplay ==
The player starts as a defenseless rabbit, hopping from the left side of the screen to the right on scrolling platforms. The goal is to avoid the creatures that appear on the platforms and reach the carrot at the right side of the screen. Landing on ("eating") the carrot turns the rabbit into Super Bunny, at which point he must return to the starting position, dispatching creatures and earning points.

The game has a different saying and song for each level (e.g., "crunch those critters" and the song "Here Comes Peter Cottontail!"). Super Bunny is credited in the game's splash screen as Reginald Rabbit.

== See also ==
- List of fictional rabbits and hares
