= The Adventures of Paddy the Beaver =

Book by Thornton Burgess

- First edition
- Author: Thornton W. Burgess
- Illustrator: Harrison Cady
- Genre: Children's fiction
- Publisher: Little, Brown and Company
- Publication date: 1917

The Adventures of Paddy the Beaver (1917) is a children's novel written by Thornton W. Burgess and illustrated by Harrison Cady.

== Plot introduction ==
Paddy moves into the Green Forest, and Sammy Jay starts to complain he is cutting down the trees, but Sammy falls into the water and learns that this did not work out very well. After that Old Man Coyote finds out Paddy is in the Green Forest, and starts to hunt for him, though for three days Paddy outsmarts him. But one day he almost catches Paddy and he would have were it not for Sammy Jay telling Paddy to get into the water. After that Paddy and Sammy become best friends.
