= Gossamer Wump =

Album by Frank Morgan

Studio album by Frank Morgan
- Released: 1949
- Label: Capitol Records

Gossamer Wump is a children's record, published in 1949 by Capitol Records, about a boy who learns to play the triangle. The story is narrated by Frank Morgan, a Hollywood actor best known for his role as the Wizard in the classic film The Wizard of Oz, with music by Billy May, and written by Hollywood screenwriters Roger Price and Helen Mack. The character of Gossamer Wump is voiced by June Foray, the prolific voice artist who is perhaps best known as the voice of "Rocket J. Squirrel" in The Rocky & Bullwinkle Show.

The story is of a little boy named Gossamer Wump (a boy "with red hair, one blue eye, one green eye, and freckles all over - even his face") who learns to play the triangle to start a musical career. He makes unsuccessful musical attempts at Gaylord Gout's dance club, and then again with Stanislav Hudnut's Orchestra. His rather disastrous debut with the orchestra leaves Gossamer defeated and confused, until a certain man gives Gossamer a very important job - the job of playing the triangle on the ice cream wagon.

The main theme of the record is an adaptation of the "Dance of the Hours" by Amilcare Ponchielli.

Gossamer Wump was one of the first children's records to be issued on a 12 inch 78 rpm vinyl disk. The standard format at that time was a 10 inch disk.

Dealers of antique records report that Gossamer Wump is one of the most popular collector's items today - one dealer reports that it is in the top three. However, it is difficult to know how popular the record was when it was issued, as there were no charts maintained by Capitol Records at the time. Gossamer Wump did appear on Billboard magazine's Children's Records sales chart. The record has been reissued by EMI in New Zealand.

In 1960, Mel-O-Toons made a cartoon called Gosomer Wump, using a slightly abbreviated version of the recording. Capitol Records included Morgan's recording in 1963 on side 2 of a Mel Blanc album titled Woody Woodpecker's Picnic.

Popular roots rock band Creedence Clearwater Revival considered naming their band after Gossamer Wump, and band member John Fogerty dedicated his 1985 solo album Centerfield to Gossamer Wump.
