= Sweet Valerian =

Manga, and anime television series

- Sweet Valerian poster

スウィート・ヴァレリアン (Suīto Varerian)
- Created by: Clamp
- Manga
- Written by: Yamakawa Yoshiki
- Published by: Kodansha
- Magazine: Nakayoshi
- Original run: February 2005 – August 24, 2005
- Volumes: 4
- Anime television series
- Directed by: Hiroaki Sakurai
- Produced by: Masao Morosawa; Atushi Fujimoto; Yumiko Masujima
- Written by: Sayuri Ōba
- Music by: Double Oats
- Studio: Madhouse
- Original network: MBS, TBS
- Original run: August 1, 2004 – December 19, 2004
- Episodes: 26 (8 of which are only on DVD)

Sweet Valerian (スウィート・ヴァレリアン, Suīto Varerian) is a series of manga and three-minute anime episodes. The anime is produced by Madhouse Production and originally conceptualized by Clamp, who also designed the characters. The series is a Powerpuff Girls spoof.

The series features three girls, Kanoko, Kate, and Pop, who live in the city of Asialand. Asialand looks like a normal city, but it is always under attack from evil monsters. The girls are on their way to take the test to get their moped licenses, but accidentally catch the attention of the living enigma, Ear Hermit. Instead of receiving moped licenses, they acquire a "Valerian License" which, to their shock and horror, transforms them into bunny-like creatures, the Relaxation Combat Team Valerian. In these forms, they are known as Serotonin, Dopamine, and Valerian. The heroines are aided by a unique panda-esque companion, Panda-bu and nifty card-swiping/magic-transformation gadgets. Together as Sweet Valerian, they defend justice when the evil Stress Team takes advantage of people's stress and turns them into monsters. The series is targeted at a very young audience.

== Characters ==
Kanoko (カノコ)
Voiced by: Ami Koshimizu
Kanoko's father used to be the manager of the large company, but now works as an inventor. She herself is poor and is all time taking on a new job, because she gets fired for having to leave and fight monsters all the time. She transforms into the white bunny Valerian by using the "bracelet of the flower" which is attached to her left arm. She is the blond character, and is the leader of the team. She tries to get the monsters to talk instead of fight, but then she ends up attacking first anyway. Powdered Valerian root is often used as a mellowing sleep aid.
Pop (ポップ, Poppu)
Voiced by: Yu Asakawa
The Chief Executive Officer of a video game company called "Leek Cartridge", Pop transforms into the grey bunny Dopamine using the "digital clock wind" wristband. When she transforms, she says "Appear, Dopamine!" and can call wild birds with a whistle. She is the dark-skinned girl who always wears hats. She is usually the one who comes up with the plan to defeat the monsters. Dopamine is a chemical in the brain which affects adrenalin and the functions of memory, attention, and problem-solving.
Kate (ケイト, Keito)
Voiced by: Kaori Nazuka
A model and up-and-coming movie star, she transforms into the yellow bunny Serotonin using an earring and a compact. She is often "busy" with other jobs and tends to speak in a monotonous tone. When she transforms, she says "Come out, Serotonin!". A black-haired girl with a strange character, Kate also happens to be into the occult. She owns a crystal ball and makes tea using a chemistry set. Serotonin is the chemical in the brain which causes happiness.
Panda-bu (パンダブー)
Voiced by: Mika Kanai
Informs the heroines when a stress monster is attacking the city. He has three children and says "bu" at the end of each sentence. Panda-bu also serves as the narrator of the series.
Stress Team (ストレス団, Sutoresu-gumi)
Voiced by: Kazuki Yao
A group of evildoers who turn people's stress into monsters. The monsters can take on any form, from ramen to frogs.
