= Bad, Bad Bunny Trouble =

1994 children's book by Hans Wilhelm

- Author: Hans Wilhelm
- Illustrator: Hans Wilhelm
- Cover artist: Hans Wilhelm
- Language: English
- Series: Bunny Trouble
- Genre: Picture book
- Publisher: Scholastic Inc.
- Publication date: February 1994
- Publication place: United States
- Media type: Print (Paperback)
- Pages: 28
- ISBN: 0-590-47916-4
- Preceded by: Bunny Trouble
- Followed by: More Bunny Trouble

Bad, Bad Bunny Trouble is a 1994 children's picture book written and illustrated by Hans Wilhelm. It is the second book of the Bunny Trouble trilogy, a series about Ralph, a soccer-loving rabbit who frequently causes trouble with his family and friends. It is preceded by Bunny Trouble and followed by More Bunny Trouble.

== Plot summary ==
After spoiling the coffee cake at his sister Liza's birthday party, Ralph is banished to the attic, but then he has to use his best soccer kick to save his family from a gang of hungry foxes.
