= Pupu Tupuna =

Pupu Tupuna is a series of Finnish children's books by the Finnish author Pirkko Koskimies.

The series stars a rabbit named Pupu Tupuna (pupu is Finnish for 'bunny'), a cat and a mouse. The books are aimed at very young children and thus have many pictures and short, easy to read text. The first book in the series, Mihin menet Pupu Tupuna?, was published in 1972, with more than twenty further books following over the next three decades.
