= The Tale of Mr. Tod =

Children's book by Beatrix Potter

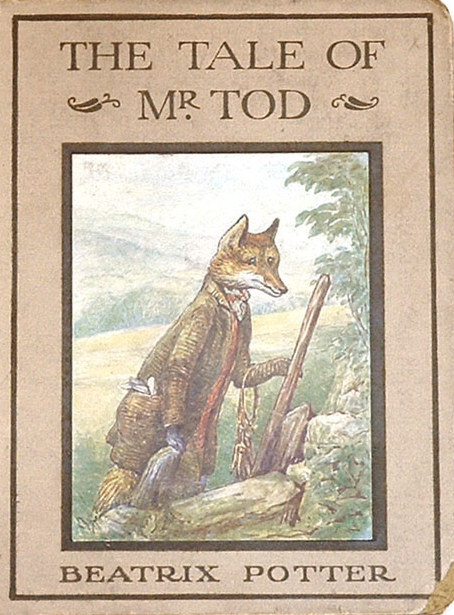
- First edition cover (USA)
- Author: Beatrix Potter
- Illustrator: Beatrix Potter
- Language: English
- Genre: Children's literature
- Publisher: Frederick Warne & Co
- Publication date: 1912
- Publication place: England
- Media type: Print (Hardcover)
- Preceded by: The Tale of Timmy Tiptoes
- Followed by: The Tale of Pigling Bland

The Tale of Mr. Tod is a book written and illustrated by Beatrix Potter and was first published by Frederick Warne & Co. in 1912. It features Peter Rabbit and Benjamin Bunny along with several other characters from Potter's previous books. An animated film adaptation of the tale was featured on the BBC television anthology series The World of Peter Rabbit and Friends in 1995.

== Plot ==
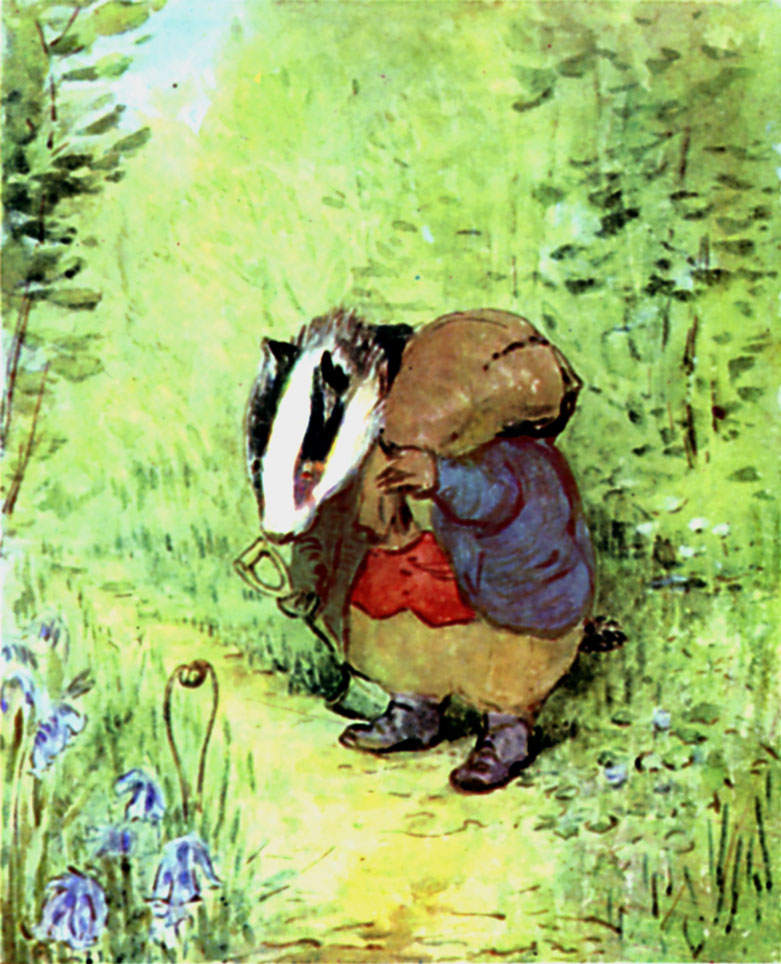
The badger Tommy Brock with the stolen bunnies

Mr. Tod, a fox, and Tommy Brock, a badger, are both troublesome neighbours and "disagreeable people". Mr. Tod owns a number of homes around the wood. Whenever he moves from one house to another, Tommy Brock moves in to the vacated premises, without permission.

Tommy Brock visits a rabbit friend, Mr. Bouncer Bunny, and then steals his grandchildren, the Flopsy Bunnies, in order to cook and eat them. Their father, Benjamin Bunny, sets off in pursuit and he and his cousin Peter Rabbit track them down to one of Mr. Tod's homes.

Mr. Tod himself soon appears and is furious to find that Tommy Brock has made himself at home and is asleep in his bed. After setting a trap that fails to have any effect — Tommy Brock is only pretending to be asleep and thus avoids it — the fox and the badger fight it out. Benjamin and Peter take advantage to escape with Benjamin's children.

== Background ==
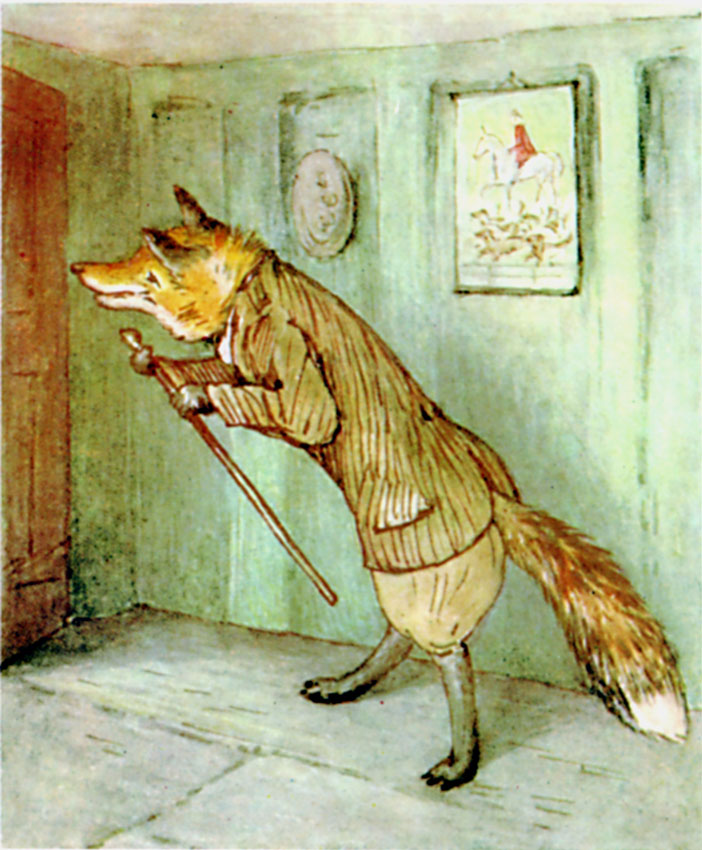
Mr. Tod

The book is dedicated to Francis William Clark who owned Ulva, a small island off Mull, in the Scottish Inner Hebrides. Potter was a relative of his, and visited the island occasionally.

"Brock" and "Tod" are Lowland Scots and Northern English dialect words for "badger" and "fox" respectively.

== Book connections ==
The story features Peter Rabbit, who first appeared in The Tale of Peter Rabbit, and Benjamin Bunny and his father Mr. Bouncer Bunny from The Tale of Benjamin Bunny, as well as Flopsy and the bunnies from The Tale of the Flopsy Bunnies. Peter's sister Cottontail, who first appeared in The Tale of Peter Rabbit, also appears in a minor role, now married as well.

== In other media ==
It is generally supposed (though this is never explicitly stated) that the "foxy whiskered gentleman" who appeared in The Tale of Jemima Puddle-Duck is in fact Mr. Tod, whose residence matches the description of that character's house. In the BBC TV animated anthology series The World of Peter Rabbit and Friends, broadcast between 1992 and 1995, they are both voiced by Dinsdale Landen. Don Henderson voiced Tommy Brock.
