= Rekkit Rabbit =

French animated television series

- Genre: Comedy
- Created by: Vincent Chalvon-Demersay; David Michel
- Developed by: Vincent Chalvon-Demersay; David Michel
- Written by: David Michel; Ernie Altbacker; Neal Boushell; Bill Freiberger; Alan Denton; Robert Vargas
- Directed by: Eric Gosselet; Jean-Louis Vandestoc (S1–2)
- Voices of: Michel Mella; Valentin Maupin
- Composers: Noam Kaniel; Alexis Dernaucourt (S1)
- Country of origin: France
- Original language: French
- No. of seasons: 3
- No. of episodes: 104 (list of episodes)

Production
- Executive producers: Berthe Lotsova; Lorraine Collet (S1–2); Jerome Cuenot (S3)
- Producers: Vincent Chalvon-Demersay; David Michel
- Editors: Rodolphe Ploquin; Romain Fuzeau
- Running time: 12 minutes
- Production companies: Marathon Media; Zodiak Kids (S2–3)

Original release
- Network: TF1 (France); Disney XD (Europe); E4; POP
- Release: 16 March 2011 – 28 December 2013

Rekkit Rabbit (known as Rekkit in France) is a French animated television series created by Vincent Chalvon-Demersay and David Michel. It was produced by Marathon Media in co-production with Disney XD for the first season and Zodiak Kids for the second and third seasons, in association with TF1. It premiered on 16 March 2011 in France.

== Plot ==
The show follows the adventures of Rekkit, a 10-foot tall magical rabbit from the planet Chakabrak, and his best friend Jay Shmufton, a 12-year old boy.

== Episodes ==
=== Season 1 (2011–12) ===
1. The Arrival
2. Hare Ball
3. Shepherd of Hamsters
4. The Moustache
5. Convict Furniture
6. Udder Chaos
7. Crayfish Boy
8. A Spy in the Ointment
9. Rekkit Swims
10. The Invitation
11. Cool Fool
12. Head Ache
13. Cabbage Heads
14. Harem Scarem
15. Little Mister Potato Guy
16. Long Days Journey Into Nothing
17. MMM Butterfly
18. Photo Finished
19. The Twins Save Rekkit
20. Sell It Rekkit
21. Tale of the Missing Tail
22. Airheads
23. Rabbits Prefer Gentlemen
24. Carpet Ninjas
25. Revenge of the Kitty Cat
26. Fuzzy Was He
27. Don't Upset The Yeti
28. Mind Reader
29. Breaking Rules Are For Fools
30. Boy Ahoy
31. Rekkit has a Secret
32. Fast and Injurious
33. The One Where Bill Gets Rekkit for a While
34. See You in My Dreams
35. Tortoise and Harebrained
36. Boo Booyah
37. Cooking Magic
38. Smelly Jay
39. InvisiBob
40. Over The Rainbow
41. Abraca-Oh No!
42. Bond Jay Bond

=== Season 2 (2012) ===
1. Zitwots
2. Rekkit Sings
3. Trimbletwit
4. Something Fishy
5. Offspring Fever
6. Snowbound
7. Muddlety Monster
8. Wignapped
9. Incog-neato
10. Flim Flam
11. Tall Order
12. Chakabrakteria
13. SK Is Sick
14. Who Framed Rekkit Rabbit

=== Season 3 (2013) ===
1. The Peeved Piper
2. Room For One More-On
3. Bewished
4. Monitor This
5. Barmy Bracelet Boffo
6. The Lorne Identity
7. Hare For Hire
8. Spies Surprise
9. Two Knights In A Daze
10. Drivers License
11. Night In The Chakabrary
12. The Hubbub Bubba
13. Sewer Tour
14. Lights Camera Rekkit
15. Statue Of Muddlety
16. The Odd-essey
17. Bed And Brakfest
18. Franken-Rekkit
19. Wooly Bully
20. Beach Party
21. Rekkit In 3D
22. Keeping Up With The Shmuftons
23. Spaced Out
24. Air Train
25. Recipe For Disaster

== Production ==
The three seasons entered production in 2009, 2010, and 2011 respectively.

== Broadcast ==
The series was broadcast by TF1 in France and Disney XD in Europe.
