= Hans Wilhelm =

American writer

Hans Wilhelm (born September 21, 1945) is a German-American writer, children's book author and illustrator, and artist. Hans Wilhelm has written and/or illustrated over 200 books – mostly for children. They have been translated in more than thirty languages and have won numerous international awards and prizes. Many of them have been made into animated television series. Presently there are over forty two million books by Hans Wilhelm in print. Some of his best-known books include "I'll Always Love You", "Bunny Trouble" series, "Tyrone The Horrible" series, "Waldo" series, and the "Noodles" books.

Wilhelm was born in Bremen, (Germany) where he grew up. Following his studies of art and business, he moved for 12 years to South Africa where he worked, painted, and was an acting member of a satirical theater group. His writing career began when he embarked on a two-year trip around the world where he lived in Bali, Spain, England and many other places.

He's also host to the "Life Explained" video series, which aims to visually explain a number of spiritual phenomena from his personal point of view. Wilhelm often refers the works of Gabriele Wittek (1933–2024), a medium and prophetess, founder of Universal Life.

== Books by Wilhelm (selected) ==
- I'll Always Love You
- The Trapp Family Book (also TV series)
- Bunny Trouble (series)
- Tyrone the Horrible (series)
- Waldo (book and TV series)
- Wake Up, Sun (written by David L. Harrison)
- What Does God Do?
- The Bremen Town Musicians
- Dinofour (series) written by Steve Metzger
- Holiday Cats (series, written by Jean Marzollo)
- Noodles book series
- The Book of Courage

and 200 more.

== Art ==
Wilhelm's art is in permanent collections of the Mazza Museum, the Dodd Center of University of Connecticut, the Kerlan Collection at University of Minnesota, and the De Grummond Children's Literature Collection of University of Southern Mississippi.

== Awards ==
The Trapp Family Book was named Best Book of the Year by Eltern magazine, Germany. Tales From the Land Under My Table was selected by Time magazine as one of the best Best Children's Book of the Year. Blackberry Ink (written by Eve Merriam) received the Parent's Choice Award. A New Home – A New Friend received the Children's book Award from the International Reading Association. Blackberry Ink (written by Eve Merriam), The Funniest Knock-Knock Book Ever, and Let's Be Friends Again were chosen as one of Child Study Association of America's Children's Book of the Year. What Does God Do? was awarded the Gold Medallion Book Award by the Evangelical Christian Publishers Association.
