= Bobo (magazine) =

Dutch children's magazine

Bobo (Netherlands)
- Frequency: Biweekly
- Publisher: Blink Publishers
- First issue: January 1, 1968; 57 years ago
- Language: Dutch
- Website: www.bobo.nl

Bobo (Indonesia)
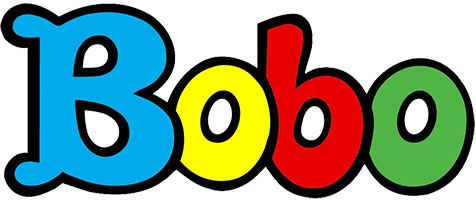

- Bobo edition in 7 April 2011
- Editor-in-Chief: Arswendo Atmowiloto (1981-1999); Kususani (2000-2015); David Togatorop (2016-present)
- Categories: Children
- Frequency: Weekly; Biweekly (Bobo Junior)
- Circulation: 145,000 (2018)
- Publisher: PT Penerbitan Sarana Bobo (Kompas Gramedia Group)
- First issue: 14 April 1973; 9 April 2002 (Bobo Junior)
- Final issue: 21 December 2022 (Bobo Junior)
- Language: Indonesian
- Website: bobo.grid.id
- ISSN: 1858-1714

Bobo is a monthly Dutch children's magazine published by Blink Publishers. Consisting of comics and stories, it is named after the protagonist Bobo, a nine year old blue anthropomorphic rabbit. The magazine has run since 1968 and was initially translated from the English-language Bobo Bunny magazine, published from 1969 to 1973.

Each issue is devoted to one subject. The purpose of the magazine is to educate four- and five-year-olds in a playful way, and it is therefore mainly distributed through the first two years of primary school.

Since 2010, Bobo has developed into a cross-media brand. Bobo has its own apps, an educational television series made by Studio 100 (started in 2011), an online training program to be used on digital schoolboards and smartboards in the classroom, and a complete merchandise line.

== Indonesian version ==
The Indonesian franchise of Bobo was first published on 14 April 1973. Unlike the Dutch version, the Indonesian version is aimed at children aged 6–12. Published by Kompas Gramedia Group, Bobo magazine become the most popular kids magazine in Indonesia. The magazine has the tagline "teman bermain dan belajar (friends to play and study)". In 1980, the lowercase b on Bobo's t-shirt was replaced by a capital B to distinguish the Indonesian rabbit from the Dutch counterpart, but it was changed back to lowercase b in the early 1990s.

The magazine in Indonesia has several 'trademark parts'. As of July 2012, it already has:

- Cergam (cerita bergambar) (picture stories): Comics without speech bubbles. There are currently three comic series in the Indonesian version: Cergam Bobo; Negeri Dongeng (short of Ceritera dari Negeri Dongeng (Stories From The Land Of Tales)); Paman Kikuk, Husin, & Asta (Oom Stuntel, Heintje, en Flap); and Bona gajah kecil berbelalai panjang (Pinkie Puff the little elephant with long trunk).
- Chosen Stories: A collection of short stories.
- FB Friends Story: A collection of stories from reader's suggestions. The stories' plots are decided on the readers' ideas on Facebook. There are currently two titles: Rahasia Hantu (Ghosts' Secret) and Liontin Pusaka Kerajaan Peri (The Heirloom Pendant Of The Fairy Kingdom).
- Dear Nirmala, Halamanku, Arena Kecil, Tak Disangka: Dear Nirmala is an advice column in which the readers can send a letter by Facebook to have their questions answered. There are two letters featured each week. Halamanku is a page to show fan art and poems sent by readers. Arena Kecil, Tak Disangka are two specific columns in one page. Arena Kecil (Little Arena) is where readers can tell their fun and memorable experiences, while Tak Disangka (Unexpected) is a place where readers can tell embarrassing and funny experiences.
- Kreatif: A page of art suggestions for the reader each week. It has been put there since Kreatif Magazines (by Kompas Gramedia Group) was not published anymore.
- Potret Negeriku (The Portrait Of My Nation): Descriptions about specific parts of Indonesia.
- Keliling Dunia (Travel Around the World): Similar to Potret Negeriku, but specifies on a place outside Indonesia.
- Ensiklo Bobo: Interesting facts from around the world. Usually about science, math, or history.
- Sayembara Bobo (Bobo Quiz): A quiz part. Usually in the form of crossword quiz. Readers can deliver the right answer to the publisher to get a chance to win a prize, usually in the form of money or sponsored items.

There are several yearly events organized by Bobo magazine in Indonesia which are held at Jakarta and Surabaya: Bobo Fair, which has fun activities meant for the readers, and Operet Bobo, which was held every year until it was discontinued and joined with the Bobo Fair. From 2001 to 2016, Bobo magazine held a Konferensi Anak (Children's Conference). This event was attended by participants aged 9–12 years.

In 2010, the magazine was completely renewed and in 2012, Bobo magazine Indonesia launched Bobo Online, the Indonesian magazine's official website. In 2016, Bobo Online was closed and replaced by Kidnesia.com, which closed on 14 April 2017. It was replaced with its current website to celebrate Bobo's 44th anniversary in Indonesia. The magazine has an active Instagram presence, and celebrated its 50th anniversary in 2023.

Until 2022 Kompas Gramedia Group also published Bobo Junior, an Indonesian translation of the Dutch counterpart for younger readers.
