= DuBose Heyward =

American dramatist (1885–1940)

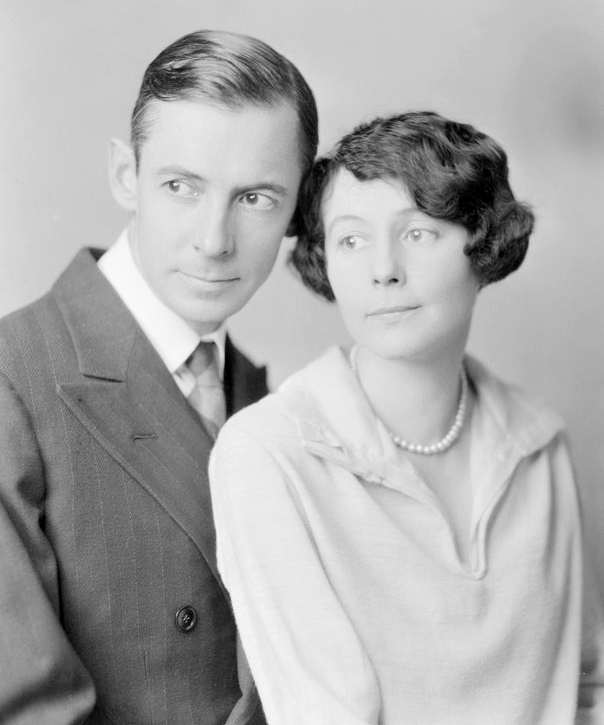
- DuBose and Dorothy Heyward c. 1929
- Born: Edwin DuBose Heyward; August 31, 1885; Charleston, South Carolina, U.S.
- Died: June 16, 1940 (aged 54); Tryon, North Carolina, U.S.
- Spouse: Dorothy Heyward
- Children: 1
- Writing career
- Notable works: Porgy (1927); Mamba's Daughters (1929); Brass Ankle (1931); Porgy and Bess (1935)

Edwin DuBose Heyward (August 31, 1885 – June 16, 1940) was an American author best known for his 1925 novel Porgy. He and his wife Dorothy, a playwright, adapted it as a 1927 play of the same name. The couple worked with composer George Gershwin to adapt the work as the 1935 opera Porgy and Bess. It was later adapted as a 1959 film of the same name.

Heyward also wrote poetry and other novels and plays, as well as the children's book The Country Bunny and the Little Gold Shoes (1939).

== Childhood, education, and early career ==
Heyward was born in 1885 in Charleston, South Carolina, the son of Jane Screven (DuBose) and Edwin Watkins Heyward. He was a descendant of Judge Thomas Heyward Jr., a South Carolinian signer of the United States Declaration of Independence, and his wife, who were of the planter elite.

As a child and young man, Heyward was frequently ill. He contracted polio when he was 18. Two years later he contracted typhoid fever, and the following year fell ill with pleurisy. He described himself as having been "a miserable student" who was uninterested in learning. He dropped out of high school in his first year at age fourteen but had a lifelong and serious interest in literature. He was able to support himself as he became a successful insurance agent. While confined to his sickbed, he wrote numerous verses and stories.

In 1913 Heyward wrote a one-act play, An Artistic Triumph, which was produced in a local theater. Although described as a derivative work that reportedly showed little promise, Heyward was encouraged enough to pursue a literary career. In 1917, while convalescing, he began to work seriously at fiction and poetry. In 1918 he published his first short story, "The Brute", in Pagan, a Magazine for Eudaemonists.

The next year, he met Hervey Allen, who was teaching at the nearby Porter Military Academy. They became close friends and formed the Poetry Society of South Carolina. It helped spark a revival of southern literature. Heyward edited the society's yearbooks until 1924 and contributed much of their content. His poetry was well received, earning him a "Contemporary Verse" award in 1921.

In 1922 he and Allen jointly published a collection, Carolina Chansons: Legends of the Low Country. They jointly edited an issue of Poetry magazine featuring Southern writers. During this period Heyward and his friend Henry T. O'Neill together operated a successful insurance and real estate company.

== Marriage and family ==
Heyward met his wife Dorothy when they were both at the MacDowell Colony in 1922. After they married, they lived for many years in Charleston. Their only child, Jenifer DuBose Heyward, was born in 1930 in New York City. She became a sculptor, actress and dancer, a member of the Ballet Russe de Monte Carlo. She married Judson Wood Jr., and died in 1984.

== Career as full-time writer ==
By 1924, Heyward had achieved a measure of financial independence, allowing him to give up business and devote himself full-time to literature. That year he published his first poetry collection, Jasbo Brown and Other Poems (1924). Between stints of writing, he supplemented his income by lecturing on southern literature at colleges and the Porter Military Academy.

=== Porgy ===
In 1925 he published his novel Porgy, set in the Black community of Charleston, which had many Gullah people. Given the positive reception for the book, he and Dorothy, a playwright, adapted it as a dramatic play. While working on that adaptation, he was approached by composer George Gershwin, who proposed collaborating on an opera of the material.

His and Dorothy's play Porgy opened on Broadway in 1927, and it was a considerable success, running for 367 performances.

Describing Heyward's achievement in Porgy, the African-American poet and playwright Langston Hughes said Heyward was one who saw "with his white eyes, wonderful, poetic qualities in the inhabitants of Catfish Row that makes them come alive." Heyward's biographer James M. Hutchisson characterized Porgy as "the first major southern novel to portray Blacks without condescension" and said that the libretto to Porgy and Bess was largely Heyward's work. Critics have described Heyward as sympathetic in his portrayal of the Southern Blacks in his work.

Others, however, have noted that the characters in Porgy, though viewed sympathetically, are described in stereotypical ways. According to Ellen Noonan,

Porgy is a sympathetic but profoundly conservative novel in the truest sense of the word. Heyward wants Charleston and its African-American residents to stay just as they are.... Linguistically marking all of the novel's African-American characters as uneducated and even illiterate is just one among many racial stereotypes.... [S]outhern whites took care of southern blacks without interference or any systematic attempt to lift African Americans beyond their lowly status.

=== Porgy and Bess ===
For the opera Porgy and Bess, both Heyward and Ira Gershwin, the composer's brother and regular partner, worked on the lyrics. Heyward did not get much credit for that work. In his introduction to the section on DuBose Heyward in Invisible Giants: Fifty Americans Who Shaped the Nation But Missed the History Books (2003), Stephen Sondheim wrote:

DuBose Heyward has gone largely unrecognized as the author of the finest set of lyrics in the history of the American musical theater – namely, those of 'Porgy and Bess'. There are two reasons for this, and they are connected. First, he was primarily a poet and novelist, and his only song lyrics were those that he wrote for Porgy. Second, some of them were written in collaboration with Ira Gershwin, a full-time lyricist, whose reputation in the musical theater was firmly established before the opera was written. But most of the lyrics in Porgy – and all of the distinguished ones – are by Heyward. I admire his theater songs for their deeply felt poetic style and their insight into character. It's a pity he didn't write any others. His work is sung, but he is unsung.

The Gershwin opera Porgy and Bess was produced in 1935, featuring top African-American singers and chorus. Large sections of dialogue from the play were set to music for the recitatives in the opera. Although it had limited success when first produced, it has since had numerous successful revivals, toured Europe, North America, and other continents, and been recognized as an American operatic masterpiece.

=== Later works ===
Heyward continued to explore Black Charleston with another novel set in Catfish Row, Mamba's Daughters (1929). He and Dorothy also adapted this as a play.

Heyward wrote the play Brass Ankle, produced in 1931 in New York. The title refers to a Southern term for a person of mixed-race ancestry, and was long used in a pejorative way. The play addressed issues of mixed-race, featuring a couple in a small southern town who have grown up believing they were white and learning about some African-American ancestry. Reviewers treated his play favorably as a version of the "tragic mulatto" genre, but it was not a commercial success.

He wrote the screenplay for the film adaptation of Eugene O'Neill's play The Emperor Jones (1933). Heyward wrote a children's book, The Country Bunny and the Little Gold Shoes (1939), which was quite popular.

His novella Star Spangled Virgin (1939) was set in Saint Croix, U.S. Virgin Islands. It deals with the domestic life of Adam Work and his woman Rhoda. It was described as "singularly charming and very original", covering their and friends' interpretations of "the relations of men and women".

Heyward died from a heart attack in June 1940, at the age of 54, in Tryon, North Carolina.

== Representation in other media ==
- The opera Porgy and Bess was adapted as a film, released in 1959.

== Works ==
=== Poetry collections ===
- Carolina Chansons: Legends of the Low Country (1922) (with Hervey Allen)
- Jasbo Brown and Other Poems (1924)
- Skylines and Horizons (1924)

=== Novels ===
- Porgy (1925)
- Angel (1926)
- Mamba's Daughters (1929)
- The Half Pint Flask (1929)
- Peter Ashley (1932)
- Lost Morning (1936)
- Star Spangled Virgin (1939)

=== Children's literature ===
- The Country Bunny and the Little Gold Shoes (1939)

=== Plays ===
- Porgy (1927) (with Dorothy Heyward)
- Brass Ankle (1931)
- Mamba's Daughters (1939) (with Dorothy Heyward)

=== Screenplay ===
- The Emperor Jones (1933) from the play by Eugene O'Neill

=== Opera ===
- Porgy and Bess (1935) (with George Gershwin and Ira Gershwin)

== See also ==
- South Carolina literature
