= The Country Bunny and the Little Gold Shoes =

1939 children's picture book by DuBose Heyward

- First edition cover (publ. Clarion Books)
- Author: DuBose Heyward
- Illustrator: Marjorie Flack
- Publisher: Clarion Books
- Publication date: September 9, 1939

The Country Bunny and the Little Gold Shoes is a 1939 children's picture book written by DuBose Heyward and illustrated by Marjorie Flack.

The book, which has never been out of print, has come to be regarded as a feminist and anti-racist statement.

According to James Hutchisson, professor of English at The Citadel, the book is probably based on a story made up by Heyward's mother, Jane Screven DuBose, and told to Heyward when he was a child. Before turning it into a book, Heyward used to tell the story to his own children.

== Plot ==
The book is the story of Cottontail, a small, brown mother bunny who aspires to be an Easter Bunny, which, in this telling, is a highly competitive position for which only five bunnies are selected each year. As a young bunny, she confidently announces that one day she will become an Easter bunny, only to be scorned by the elite Easter bunnies, "big white bunnies who lived in fine houses" who tell her to "go back to the country and eat a carrot."

She returns to the country where "by and by she had a husband and then one day, much to her surprise there were twenty-one Cottontail babies to take care of." She gives up on her dream and brings up her children exceedingly well, teaching them to be responsible, self-reliant and cooperative by requiring them to help in the vegetable garden and with the housework. When one of the five Easter bunnies is no longer fast enough, Grandfather Bunny calls all the bunnies in the world to the Palace of Easter Eggs to select a replacement who must be wise, kind, and swift. Cottontail's parenting demonstrates these qualities, and since she can entrust her household to her children in her absence, she is asked to report to the Palace on Easter Eve as the new fifth Easter Bunny.

Although she arrives in country clothes, the other four Easter Bunnies, being wise and kind, do not laugh at her. The five spend the whole night distributing various types of eggs suitable to different children. Finally, although she is tired, the "best and hardest" assignment is given to Cottontail because she has a loving heart for children. She must carry a special egg over two rivers and three mountains to a high peak where a boy who has been ill for a year sleeps. She almost makes it but slips on the ice and snow and tumbles down far from the last peak just as the sun is about to rise. Knowing how sad the boy would be not to receive an egg on Easter, Cottontail wants to deliver it, but injured in her fall, she cannot stand. Grandfather Bunny appears and makes her the "Gold Shoe Easter Bunny" with a pair of little gold shoes that enable her to reach the boy's cottage in two jumps. She also makes it back to her well-tended home with a basket of eggs for her own children before they wake up Easter morning.

The story suggests that when children are raised to be industrious and participate in domestic labor, parents may have more freedom to pursue external goals, as the children require less oversight into their adulthood.

It also sends the message to child readers that if you are obedient and helpful to your parents, your parents will be happier and more likely to become people that you can be proud of.

== Feminist statement ==
Caroline Kennedy calls the heroine of Country Bunny her "all-time favorite character" from a childhood book: "I see her now as a woman who re-enters the work force after raising a family — 'leans in,' and does it all — much better than the big Jack Rabbits." Author Francis Itani also remembers it as a childhood favorite in which the Country Bunny "goes on a quest to prove that she (as much as the male bunnies) can be wisest, swiftest and kindest."
