= Peter Cottontail =

Fictional rabbit

Peter Cottontail is a name temporarily assumed by a fictional rabbit named Peter Rabbit in the works of Thornton Burgess. In 1910, when Burgess began his Old Mother West Wind series, the cast of animals included Peter Rabbit. Four years later, in The Adventures of Peter Cottontail, Peter Rabbit, unhappy at his plain-sounding name, briefly changed his name to Peter Cottontail because he felt it made him sound more important. He began putting on airs to live up to his important-sounding name, but after much teasing from his friends, soon returned to his original name, because, as he put it, "There's nothing like the old name after all." In the 26-chapter book, he takes on the new name partway through chapter 2, and returns to his "real" name, Peter Rabbit, at the end of chapter 3. Burgess continued to write about Peter Rabbit until his retirement in 1960, in over 15,000 daily syndicated newspaper stories, many of them featuring Peter Rabbit, and some of them later published as books, but "Peter Cottontail" is never mentioned again.

When Thornton Burgess began making up bedtime stories with named animals for his 4-year-old son, the boy was already familiar with Beatrix Potter's Peter Rabbit character, and would not allow his father to give his stories' rabbit character any other name. Later when the boy stayed with grandparents for a month while widower Burgess (his wife had died in childbirth) worked, he wrote stories down and mailed them to be read to the boy. Later still, the magazine where Burgess worked published a few of those stories. Then a representative of publisher Little, Brown and Company came by asking the magazine editor about children's stories, and the editor pointed him to Burgess. Little, Brown then published some of Burgess' stories as the book Old Mother West Wind. The name of Burgess' rabbit character was never changed along the way.

The laws governing usage of published character names were less strict back then than they are today. Burgess was not the only author to reuse the name Peter Rabbit, though with the huge popularity of Old Mother West Wind, he became the most known. A fuller treatment on this topic can be found in Nature's Ambassador: The Legacy of Thornton W. Burgess by Christie Palmer Lowrance.

Harrison Cady, who illustrated Burgess' books, wrote and drew the syndicated Peter Rabbit comic strip from 1920 to 1948.

The 1949 song "Here Comes Peter Cottontail" became popular on the country and pop charts and informally gave the Easter Bunny a name. The 1971 Easter television special Here Comes Peter Cottontail was based on a 1957 novel by Priscilla and Otto Friedrich titled The Easter Bunny That Overslept.
