= Thornton W. Burgess Museum =

Former biographical museum in East Sandwich, Massachusetts

Coordinates: 41.757°N 70.500°W

Thornton W. Burgess Museum was a museum in East Sandwich, Massachusetts dedicated to the conservationist and children's book author Thornton W. Burgess (1874–1965). It was founded in 1974.

The museum was based in a Colonial-style house on Shawme Pond (the model for the "Smiling Pool" in Burgess's stories). Burgess never lived in the house, but it was owned by one of his aunts. Burgess was particularly known for writing Peter Rabbit stories, following the model of Beatrix Potter, and the Peter Rabbit character was prominently featured on the property. The site also included a small library, an art gallery, and a jam shop.

The museum updated its name to Thornton W. Burgess Society Green Briar Nature Center & Jam Kitchen as of 2024.
