= Harrison Cady =

American illustrator and author (1877–1970)

- Harrison and Melinna Cady vacationing in Venice in 1931.
- Born: Walter Harrison Cady; 1877
- Died: 1970 (aged 92–93)
- Areas: Cartoonist, Artist
- Pseudonym: Gordon Curtis
- Notable works: Peter Rabbit
- Spouse: Melinna

Walter Harrison Cady (1877–1970) was an American illustrator and author, best known for his Peter Rabbit comic strip which he wrote and drew for 28 years.

== Biography ==
=== Early life and career ===
Cady was born in Gardner, Massachusetts, to a town selectman, Edwin Cady, who ran a local general store. His father fostered a love of nature and encouraged his art skills. Cady entered an apprenticeship with a local painter, Parker Perkins. His first publication came as early as 1894: an illustration in a supplement to Harper's Young People (signed Walter H. Cady).

Harrison was 18 when his father was killed in Boston. He moved to New York City and within a year found work as an illustrator with the Brooklyn Eagle newspaper. His salary of $10 a week made it possible for him to support his mother; the two lived in a Greenwich Village cold-water flat. He stayed at the Brooklyn Eagle for four years, while also freelancing to other publications.

Cady's first published comic strip was Jolly Jumpers, which ran from 1912 to 1914 via the Publishers Press syndicate.

His income increased considerably after Life editor John Ames Mitchell signed Cady as staff artist and cartoonist. This led to a long career as a newspaper and magazine illustrator, as well as numerous children's books, featuring both fantastic and realistic animal illustrations.

Peter Rabbit cartoon, 1922.

Cady's Peter Rabbit comic strip, which was based on Thornton Burgess' Peter Cottontail stories (as opposed to Beatrix Potter's version) was launched by the New York Herald Tribune Syndicate on August 15, 1920. He continued to write and draw the strip for almost three decades. Cady had a long association with Burgess, illustrating the writer's books, including Happy Jack, and his daily newspaper column, Bedtime Stories. Their partnership spanned five decades, beginning with Baby Possum Has a Scare (c. 1912), The Adventures of Reddy Fox (1913), and Buster Bear Invites Old Mr. Toad to Dine (c. 1914). The series continued into the 1950s with At Paddy the Beaver's Pond (1950), followed by the reprint The Animal World of Thornton Burgess (1962).

After his escalating success through the 1920s, Cady and his wife Melinna decided to take an extended vacation. Touring Europe for two months in 1931, they visited London, Paris, Avignon, Brussels, Arles, Amsterdam, Rome, and Venice. In a letter to Harrison's mother, Melinna detailed their adventures:

"So far I like Paris as a place to live better than any other city.... The shops, the museums with the great works of art.... The Follies!!! and on and on. Venice is filled with charm & great beauty & romance yet back of it all, I could imagine in time one might feel the past tragedy of the place. Every afternoon at 4, Harrison & I started in a gondola and just wandered in & out & around until 8 o'clock. It, no doubt, sounds utterly foolish at my age to be so enthusiastic about everything, but, my dear, I am living in a state of thrills."

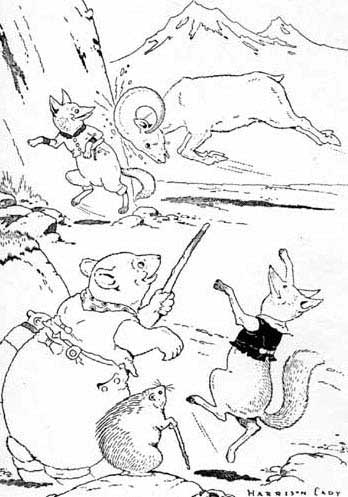
Harrison Cady's frontispiece to the Mother West Wind "Where" Stories by Thornton Burgess

Cady was very prolific, illustrating over 70 years for such publications as St. Nicholas Magazine, Boys' Life, The Saturday Evening Post, Ladies' Home Journal, Good Housekeeping and Country Gentleman. He illustrated the Queen Silver-Bell series by Frances Hodgson Burnett.

In addition to his extensive illustrating of others' books, Cady also authored several books with his own illustrations, including his Butternut Hill series (1929), Johnny Funny-Bunny's Picnic Party (1928) and Spring Moving Day (1928).

When he retired in 1948, Vincent Fago took over the Peter Rabbit strip. Avon published Cady's Peter Rabbit Comics in 1947.

== Museum ==
His work is on display at the Thornton W. Burgess Museum in Sandwich, Massachusetts.

== Bibliography ==
- Alphabetical list of Thornton Burgess books illustrated by Harrison Cady
