= Thornton W. Burgess =

American writer and conservationist

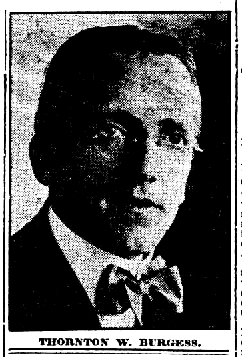
- Born: Thornton Waldo Burgess; January 14, 1874; Sandwich, Massachusetts
- Died: June 5, 1965 (aged 91); Hampden, Massachusetts
- Resting place: Springfield Cemetery, Springfield, Massachusetts
- Occupations: Author of children's books Conservationist
- Spouse(s): Nina E. Osbourne Burgess (1905–1906); Fannie H. Phillips Burgess (1911–1950)
- Children: Thornton Waldo Burgess III

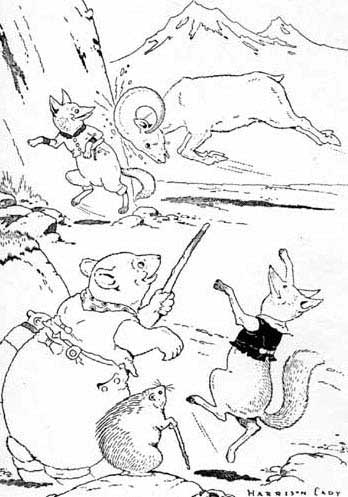
Harrison Cady's frontispiece to the Mother West Wind "Where" Stories depicting Burgess animal characters

Thornton Waldo Burgess (January 14, 1874 – June 5, 1965) was an American conservationist and author of children's stories. By the time he retired, he had written more than 170 books and 15,000 stories for his daily newspaper column.

== Biography ==
=== Early life and career ===
Born January 14, 1874 in Sandwich, Massachusetts, on Cape Cod, Burgess was the son of Caroline F. Haywood and Thornton W. Burgess Sr., a direct descendant of Thomas Burgess, one of the first Sandwich settlers in 1637. Thornton, Sr., died the same year his son was born, and the young Thornton, Jr. was brought up by his mother in Sandwich. They lived in humble circumstances. As a youth, he worked tending cows, picking trailing arbutus (mayflowers) or berries, shipping water lilies from local ponds, selling candy, and trapping muskrats. William C. Chipman, one of his employers, lived on Discovery Hill Road, a wildlife habitat of woodland and wetland. This habitat became the setting of many stories in which Burgess refers to Smiling Pool and the Old Briar Patch.

Graduating from Sandwich High School in 1891, Burgess briefly attended a business college in Boston from 1892 to 1893, living in Somerville, Massachusetts, at that time. But he disliked studying business and wanted to be an author. He relocated to Springfield, Massachusetts, where he accepted a job as an editorial assistant at the Phelps Publishing Company. His first stories were written using the pseudonym "W. B. Thornton".

Burgess married Nina Osborne in 1905, but she died in childbirth a year later, leaving him to raise their son alone. It is said that he began writing bedtime stories to entertain his young son, Thornton III. Burgess remarried in 1911; his wife Fannie had two children by a previous marriage. The couple later bought a home in Hampden, Massachusetts, in 1925 that became Burgess' permanent residence in 1957. His second wife died in August 1950. Burgess returned frequently to Sandwich, which he always claimed as his spiritual home. Many of his childhood experiences and the people he knew there influenced his interest and were the impetus for his concern for wildlife.

=== Old Mother West Wind ===
Burgess used his outdoor observations of nature as plots for his stories. In Burgess' first book, Old Mother West Wind (1910), the reader meets many of the characters found in later books and stories. The characters in the Old Mother West Wind series include Peter Rabbit (known briefly as Peter Cottontail), Jimmy Skunk, Sammy Jay, Bobby Raccoon, Little Joe Otter, Grandfather Frog, Billy Mink, Jerry Muskrat, Spotty the Turtle, Old Mother West Wind, and her Merry Little Breezes.

=== Additional publications ===
For the next 50 years, Burgess steadily wrote books that were published around the world in many languages, including French, Gaelic, German, Italian, Spanish, and Swedish. Collaborating with him was his illustrator and friend Harrison Cady who was born and raised in Gardner, Massachusetts, and thereafter of New York and Rockport, Massachusetts. Peter Rabbit was created by British author and illustrator Beatrix Potter, prompting Burgess to note, "I like to think that Miss Potter gave Peter a name known the world over, while I with Mr. Cady's help perhaps made him a character."

From 1895 to 1962, Burgess wrote "nearly 900" stories, natural science articles, and poems for magazines, including 201 children's stories for People's Home Journal magazine. For over 16 years from May 1913 through the magazine's demise following its final December 1929 issue, Burgess published a children's story in every issue of People's Home Journal magazine.

From 1912 to 1960, without interruption, Burgess wrote his syndicated daily newspaper column (via the George Matthew Adams Service), Bedtime Stories.

=== Radio broadcasts ===
From 1912 to 1960, Burgess also broadcast on the radio. His Radio Nature League radio series began at WBZ (AM), then located in Springfield, in early January 1925. Burgess broadcast the program from the studio at the Hotel Kimball on Wednesday evening at 7:30 p.m. Praised by educators and parents, the program had listeners and members in more than 30 states at its peak. Burgess' Radio Nature League disbanded briefly in August 1930, but he continued to give radio talks for WBZ concerning conservation and the humane treatment of animals.

=== Final publications ===
In 1960, Burgess published his last book, Now I Remember, Autobiography of an Amateur Naturalist, depicting memories of his early life in Sandwich as well as his career highlights. That same year, Burgess, at the age of 86, had published his 15,000th newspaper column.

In 1998, Burgess' granddaughter, Frances B. Meigs, published My Grandfather, Thornton W. Burgess : An Intimate Portrait, detailing her childhood growing up under his wing.

=== Death ===
He died on June 5, 1965, at the age of 91. His son had died suddenly the year before.

== Awards and accomplishments ==
Burgess was actively involved with conservation efforts. Some of his projects during his lifetime included:

- Helping to pass laws protecting migrant wildlife.
- "The Green Meadow Club" for land conservation programs.
- "The Bedtime Stories Club" for wildlife protection programs.
- "Happy Jack Squirrel Saving Club" for War Savings Stamps & Bonds.
- The Radio Nature League broadcast from WBZ in Boston and WBZA in Springfield, Massachusetts.

For his efforts, Burgess also received:

- An Honorary Literary Degree in 1938, from Northeastern University
- A special gold medal from the Museum of Science in Boston, for "leading children down the path to the wide wonderful world of the outdoors"
- The Distinguished Service Medal of the Permanent Wildlife Protection Fund.

== Legacy and influence ==
=== Wildlife Sanctuaries and Museum ===
After his death, the Massachusetts Audubon Society purchased Burgess' Hampden home and established the Laughing Brook Wildlife Sanctuary at that location; the house is listed on the National Register of Historic Places.

The Thornton W. Burgess Society operates the Green Briar Nature Center in East Sandwich, Massachusetts. The Society's Thornton W. Burgess Museum in Sandwich closed to the public October 2012.

=== Other ===
- A middle school in Hampden, Massachusetts was named after Burgess in honor of his work for conservation. The school opened in 1967 and was closed by the Hampden-Wilbraham Regional School District in June 2018.
- In the early 1970s, an anime television adaptation of some of Burgess' works was produced by a Japanese animation studio and was later distributed worldwide. The English language translation was entitled Fables of the Green Forest.
- John Crowley's novel Little, Big (1980) includes allusions to locations and characters in Burgess' stories.

== Books ==
- 1905 The Bride's Primer (contributor)
- 1910 Old Mother West Wind
- 1911 Mother West Wind's Children
- 1912 Baby Possum Has a Scare
- 1912 Baby Possum's Queer Voyage
- 1912 Mother West Wind's Animal Friends
- 1912 The Boy Scouts of Woodcraft Camp
- 1913 Little Animal Stories for Little Children
- 1913 Mother West Wind's Neighbors
- 1913 The Adventures of Reddy Fox
- 1913 The Adventures of Johnny Chuck
- 1913 The Boy Scouts on Swift River
- 1914 The Adventures of Peter Cottontail
- 1914 A Glad Time Made a Sad Time
- 1914 Danny Meadow Mouse Learns Something
- 1914 Fun with Farmer Brown's Boy
- 1914 How Unc' Billy Possum Met Buster Bear
- 1914 Jack Frost Helps Paddy the Beaver
- 1914 Jerry Muskrat Begins to Build
- 1914 Jerry Muskrat Is Laughed At
- 1914 Jerry Muskrat Wins Respect
- 1914 Jumper the Hare Cannot Sleep
- 1914 Mr. Toad and Danny Meadow Mouse Take a Walk
- 1914 Old Mr. Toad Gets His Stomach Full
- 1914 Peter Rabbit Puts on Airs
- 1914 Striped Chipmunk's Secret Joke
- 1914 The Adventures of Unc' Billy Possum
- 1914 The Boy Scouts on Lost Trail
- 1914 Unc' Billy Possum Has a Fright
- 1914 The Adventures of Mr. Mocker
- 1914 The Adventures of Jerry Muskrat
- 1915 The Adventures of Danny Meadow Mouse
- 1915 Mother West Wind "Why" Stories
- 1915 My Own Bedtime Story
- 1915 Peter Rabbit's Get Acquainted Party
- 1915 The Adventures of Grandfather Frog
- 1915 The Adventures of Chatterer the Red Squirrel
- 1915 The Adventures of Sammy Jay
- 1915 The Bedtime Story Calendar
- 1915 The Boy Scouts in a Trapper's Camp
- 1915 Tommy and the Wishing Stone
- 1915 Tommy's Wishes Come True
- 1916 Little Animal Stories for Children
- 1916 Mother West Wind "How" Stories
- 1916 The Adventures of Buster Bear
- 1916 The Adventures of Old Mr. Toad
- 1916 The Adventures of Prickly Porky
- 1916 The Adventures of Old Man Coyote
- 1917 An Important Meeting at the Smiling Pool
- 1917 Busy Folks and Sleepy Folks
- 1917 Four little Mice at School and Play
- 1917 Johnny Chuck Loses His Temper
- 1917 Mother West Wind "When" Stories
- 1917 Paddy the Beaver Gives Warning
- 1917 Peter Rabbit Introduces His Big Cousin
- 1917 Peter Rabbit Learns from Striped Chipmunk
- 1917 Striped Chipmunk Has a Secret
- 1917 The Adventures of Paddy the Beaver
- 1917 The Adventures of Poor Mrs. Quack
- 1918 The Adventures of Bobby Coon
- 1918 The Adventures of Jimmy Skunk
- 1918 Mother West Wind "Where" Stories
- 1918 Happy Jack
- 1918 Happy Jack Squirrel's Thrift Club
- 1919 Mrs. Peter Rabbit
- 1919 The Adventures of Bob White
- 1919 The Adventures of Ol' Mistah Buzzard
- 1919 The Burgess Bird Book for Children
- 1920 Bowser the Hound
- 1920 Old Granny Fox
- 1920 The Burgess Animal Book for Children
- 1921 Lightfoot the Deer
- 1921 Tommy's Change of Heart
- 1922 Blacky the Crow
- 1922 Buster Bear Invites Old Mr. Toad to Dine
- 1922 Grandfather Frog Stays in the Smiling Pool
- 1922 Whitefoot the Woodmouse
- 1923 Buster Bear's Twins
- 1923 The Burgess Flower Book for Children
- 1924 Billy Mink
- 1925 Animal Pictures
- 1925 Little Joe Otter
- 1926 Jerry Muskrat at Home
- 1926 The Christmas Reindeer
- 1927 A Frightened Baby
- 1927 A Great Joke on Jimmy Skunk
- 1927 A Woe-Begone Little Bear
- 1927 An Imp of Mischief
- 1927 Cubby Bear Has a Mind of His Own
- 1927 Cubby Finds an Open Door
- 1927 Cubby Gets a Bath
- 1927 Cubby in Mother Brown's Pantry
- 1927 Digger the Badger Decides to Stay
- 1927 Grandfather Frog Gets a Ride
- 1927 Happy Jack Squirrel Helps Unc' Billy
- 1927 Longlegs the Heron
- 1927 Milk and Honey
- 1927 The Neatness of Bobby Coon
- 1927 What Farmer Brown's Boy Did
- 1928 Bobby Coon Has a Good Time
- 1928 Bowser the Hound Meets His Match
- 1928 Grandfather Frog Fools Farmer Brown's Boy
- 1928 Happy Jack Squirrel's Bright Idea
- 1928 Peter Rabbit Learns to Use His New Coat
- 1929 Farmer Brown's Boy Becomes Curious
- 1929 Little Joe Otter's Slide
- 1929 The Burgess Seashore Book for Children
- 1929 Wild Flowers We Know
- 1929 Wild Flowers We Should Know
- 1930 Betty Bear's Lesson
- 1930 Whitefoot's Secret
- 1932 Big Book of Green Meadow Stories
- 1932 The Burgess Big Book of Green Meadow Stories
- 1933 Birds You Should Know
- 1933 Jimmy Skunk's Justice
- 1933 Peter Rabbit's Carrots
- 1935 The Wishing-Stone Stories
- 1937 Big Thornton Burgess Story-book
- 1937 Tales from the Storyteller's House
- 1937 The Book of Animal Life
- 1938 Mother Nature's Song and Story Book
- 1938 While the Story-Log Burns
- 1940 A Merry Coasting Party
- 1940 A Robber Meets His Match
- 1940 Bobby Coon's Mistake
- 1940 Paddy's Surprise Visitor
- 1940 Peter Rabbit Proves a Friend
- 1940 Reddy Fox's Sudden Engagement
- 1940 The Three Little Bears
- 1940 Young Flash the Deer
- 1941 Little Pete's Adventure
- 1941 The Little Burgess Animal Book for Children
- 1941 The Little Burgess Bird Book for Children
- 1942 Animal Stories (also published as The Animal World of Thornton Burgess)
- 1942 Little Chuck's Adventure
- 1942 Little Red's Adventure
- 1942 Thornton Burgess Animal Stories
- 1944 On the Green Meadows
- 1944 The Feast at Big Rock
- 1944 Why Peter Rabbit's Ears Are Long and Three Other Stories
- 1945 At the Smiling Pool
- 1945 The Big Book of Burgess Nature Stories
- 1946 The Crooked Little Path
- 1947 The Dear Old Briar-Patch
- 1949 Along Laughing Brook
- 1949 Baby Animal Stories
- 1949 Nature Almanac
- 1950 A Thornton Burgess Picture Story Book
- 1950 At Paddy the Beaver's Pond
- 1953 Everybody Lends Jerry Muskrat a Hand
- 1953 Peter Rabbit's Prank
- 1953 Reddy Fox Takes a Bath
- 1954 Peter Rabbit and Reddy Fox
- 1954 The Littlest Christmas Tree
- 1955 Aunt Sally's Friends in Fur
- 1955 Stories Around the Year
- 1956 50 Favorite Burgess Stories
- 1956 Little Peter Cottontail
- 1957 How Peter Cottontail Got His Name
- 1958 Read Aloud Peter Rabbit Stories
- 1959 Bedtime Stories
- 1959 Nature Stories to Read Aloud
- 1960 Now I Remember: Autobiography of an Amateur Naturalist
- 1963 The Million Little Sunbeams
- 1965 Mother West Wind Stories to Read Aloud
- 1965 The Burgess Book of Nature Lore

== Sources ==
- Burgess, Thornton W. (1960). Now I Remember: Autobiography of an Amateur Naturalist. Boston: Little, Brown and Company. Library of Congress Catalog No. 60-11637
- "Disembodied Voice Leads Multitude". Hartford Courant. 28 October 1928. p. E16.
- Scully, Francis X. (24 February 1977). "Sage of Sandwich Wrote over 15,000 Animal Stories, Books". Bradford (Pennsylvania) Era. p. 16.
- "WBZ Starts Radio Nature Association". The Christian Science Monitor. 18 February 1925. p. 9.
