= Mala Tribich =

Holocaust survivor and educational speaker

Mala Tribich MBE
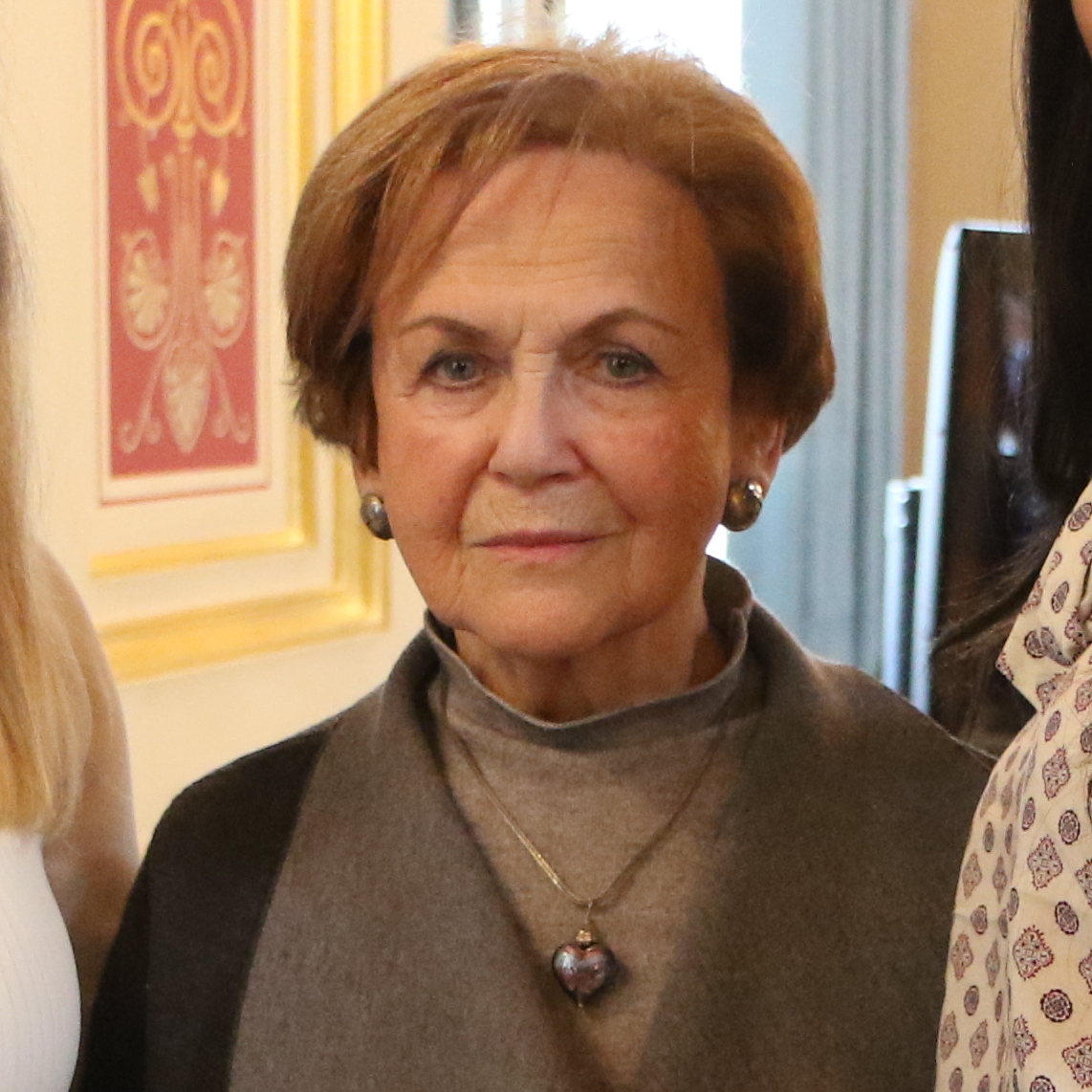
- in 2019
- Born: Mala Helfgott; 1930 (age 95–96); Piotrków Trybunalski
- Known for: Surviving the Holocaust
- Relatives: Ben Helfgott (brother)

Mala Tribich MBE (born Mala Helfgott 24 September 1930) is a Polish-born British-Jewish Holocaust survivor and educational speaker. On Holocaust Memorial Day in 2026, she was the first Holocaust survivor to address the British Cabinet.

== Early life ==
Tribich was born in 1930 to a Jewish family in Piotrków Trybunalski, Łódź Voivodeship, Poland. Her family were part of a population of 55,000. Her mother, Sara, looked after the house and her father, Moishe, was the town's miller.

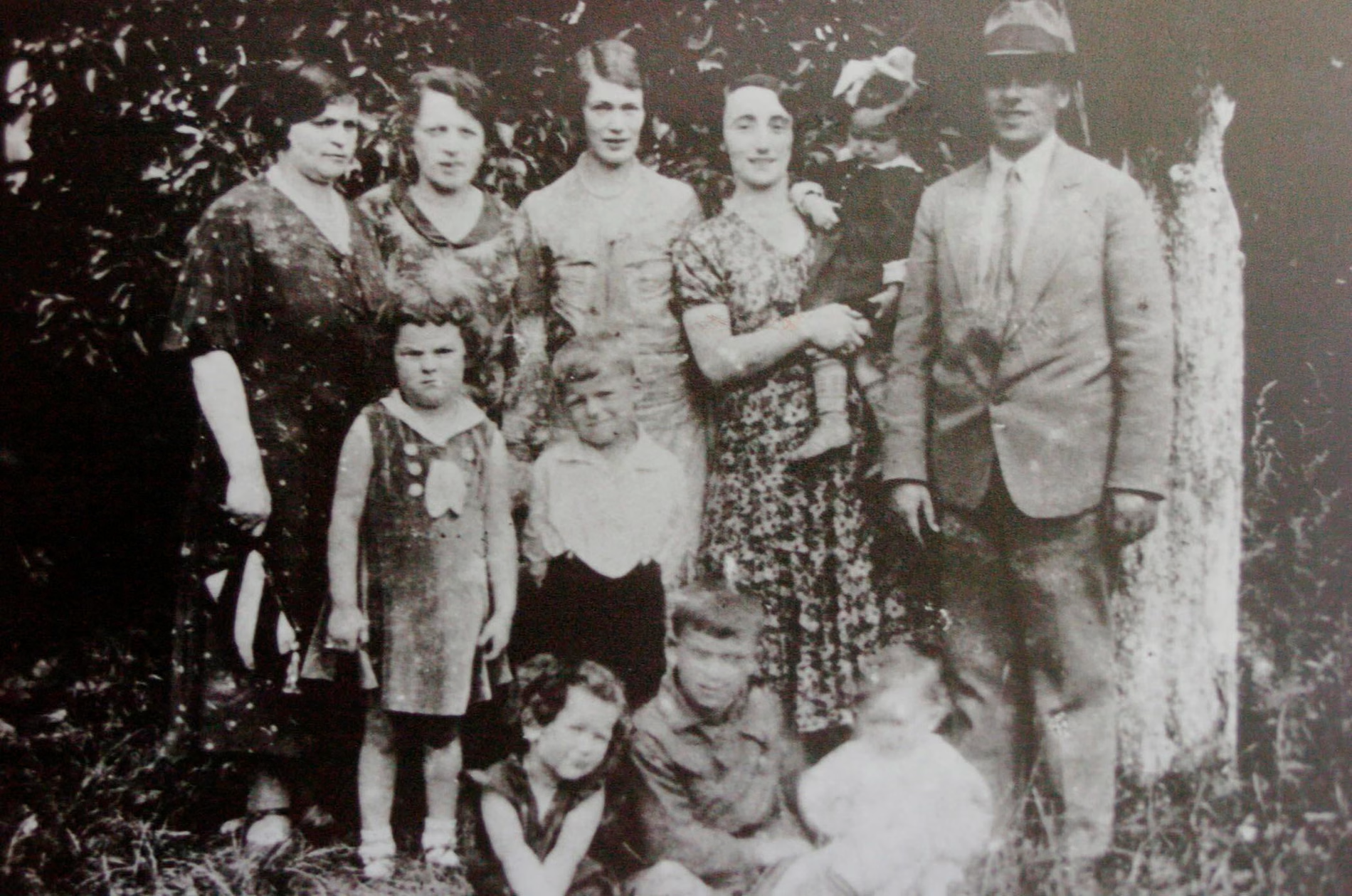
Mala's family in 1934 (her brother Ben is centre left and she is in front)

She was with her siblings at her grandparents in Sieradz on 1 September 1939 when the German army invaded Poland. She was re-united with her parents at Sulejów where incendiary bombs were dropped. The town burned and the population of 5,000 unwisely sheltered in a nearby wood, that also burned. The family returned to their home town where her two uncles were among the many Jewish men who were shot. Her father avoided this as he was able to confuse the guards.

They were held in a ghetto and her parents decided that they would pay a family called Maciejewski to take them in as "Christian children". The Maciejewski arrived and using two separate trips they moved her and, a week later, her cousin Idzia to their house in Częstochowa. They pretended to be visitors to the Maciejewski family. They missed their families and Mala persuaded the Maciejewskis to take her to another family. Mala made her way back to Piotrków Trybunalski, but Idzia was never heard of again.

During the Holocaust, she was interned at Ravensbrück and later sent to Bergen-Belsen. She was fourteen and she was there for three months suffering from typhus before troops arrived to free them on 15 April 1945. Her younger cousin and Anne Frank were fellow prisoners. Anne died from typhus before the camp was liberated.

She was taken in by Sweden after the war and she was surprised when a letter arrived from her brother who was in Britain. She and her brother Ben, who died in 2023, were the only members of her family who survived. Her brother had captained a British weightlifting team.

Tribich donated her time in Britain to give witness to her experience of the Holocaust. On the 80th anniversary of the liberation of Auschwitz she returned to Poland to visit.

== Later life ==
Tribich has lived in the UK since 1947. She trained as a secretary in London and in 1950 married Maurice Tribich, an architect from a British Jewish family.

She has given talks at many schools and universities across the UK about the Holocaust.

== Honours ==
Tribich was appointed a Member of the Order of the British Empire (MBE) in the 2012 Birthday Honours, for services to education.

On Holocaust Memorial Day 2026, she was the first holocaust survivor to address the Cabinet. She was welcomed at No.10 Downing Street by the Prime Minister Keir Starmer. She spoke of the revival in anti-semitism in Manchester and Sydney and she received a standing ovation after her five minute speech. She later joined other holocaust survivors and their families at Buckingham Palace where she re-met Charles III. The King was re-showing portraits that he had commissioned of holocaust survivors including Zigi Shipper, Anita Lasker-Wallfisch and Helen Aronson.
