= Manfred Goldberg =

German-born-British Holocaust survivor and educator (1930–2025)

Manfred Goldberg MBE BEM
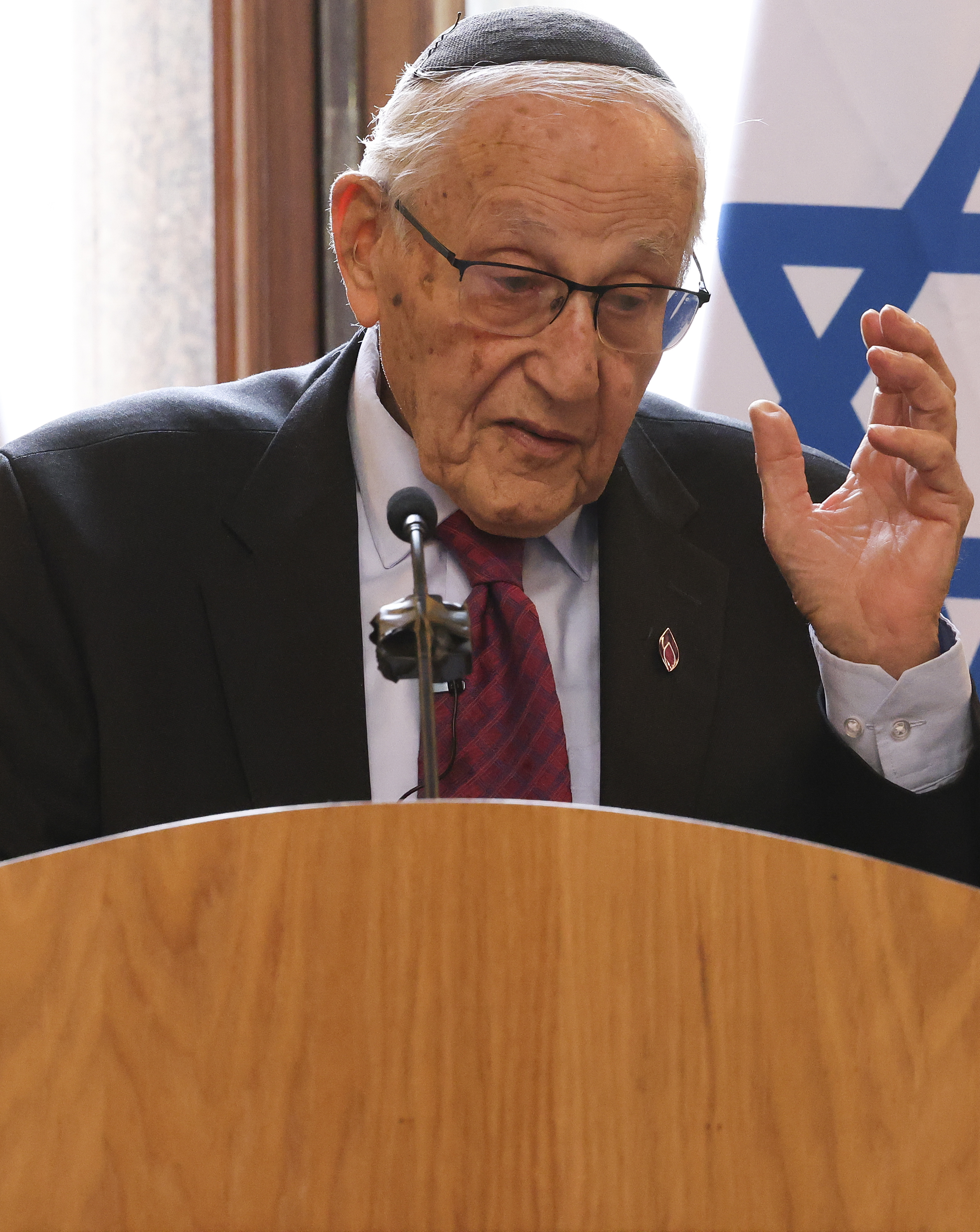
- Goldberg in 2023
- Born: 21 April 1930; Kassel, Hesse, German Reich
- Died: 6 November 2025 (aged 95); London, England
- Education: Northampton Polytechnic (present-day City St George's, University of London)
- Years active: 2000s–2025
- Organization: Holocaust Educational Trust
- Spouse: Shary Schechter (m. 1961)
- Children: 4

Manfred Goldberg MBE BEM (21 April 1930 – 6 November 2025) was a German-born British electronics engineer who survived the Holocaust. He went on to become an educator and public speaker, working with the Holocaust Educational Trust to raise awareness of the Holocaust.

== Biography ==
Manfred Goldberg was born in Kassel on 21 April 1930, the elder son of Galician born textile merchant Baruch "Benno" Goldberg (died 1986) and Rosa Seeman (died 1961), both Polish Orthodox Jews. He attended a Jewish primary school. Just before the outbreak of World War II, his father escaped to the United Kingdom in August 1939. In December 1941, Goldberg, alongside his mother and little brother, was detained and deported to the Riga Ghetto. His little brother was later killed by the Nazis. In March 1943, while at the ghetto, he celebrated his Bar mitzvah. In August 1943, he was sent to a labour camp near the Riga Ghetto where he was forced to work laying railway tracks. During the Riga offensive in 1944, he was moved to the Stutthof concentration camp. Goldberg spent eight months doing forced labour at Stutthof and its subcamps Stolp and Burggraben. Only a few days before the end of the war, Goldberg, together with his mother, was sent on a death march on a barge for six days. On 3 May 1945, he was liberated by British troops in Neustadt in Holstein.

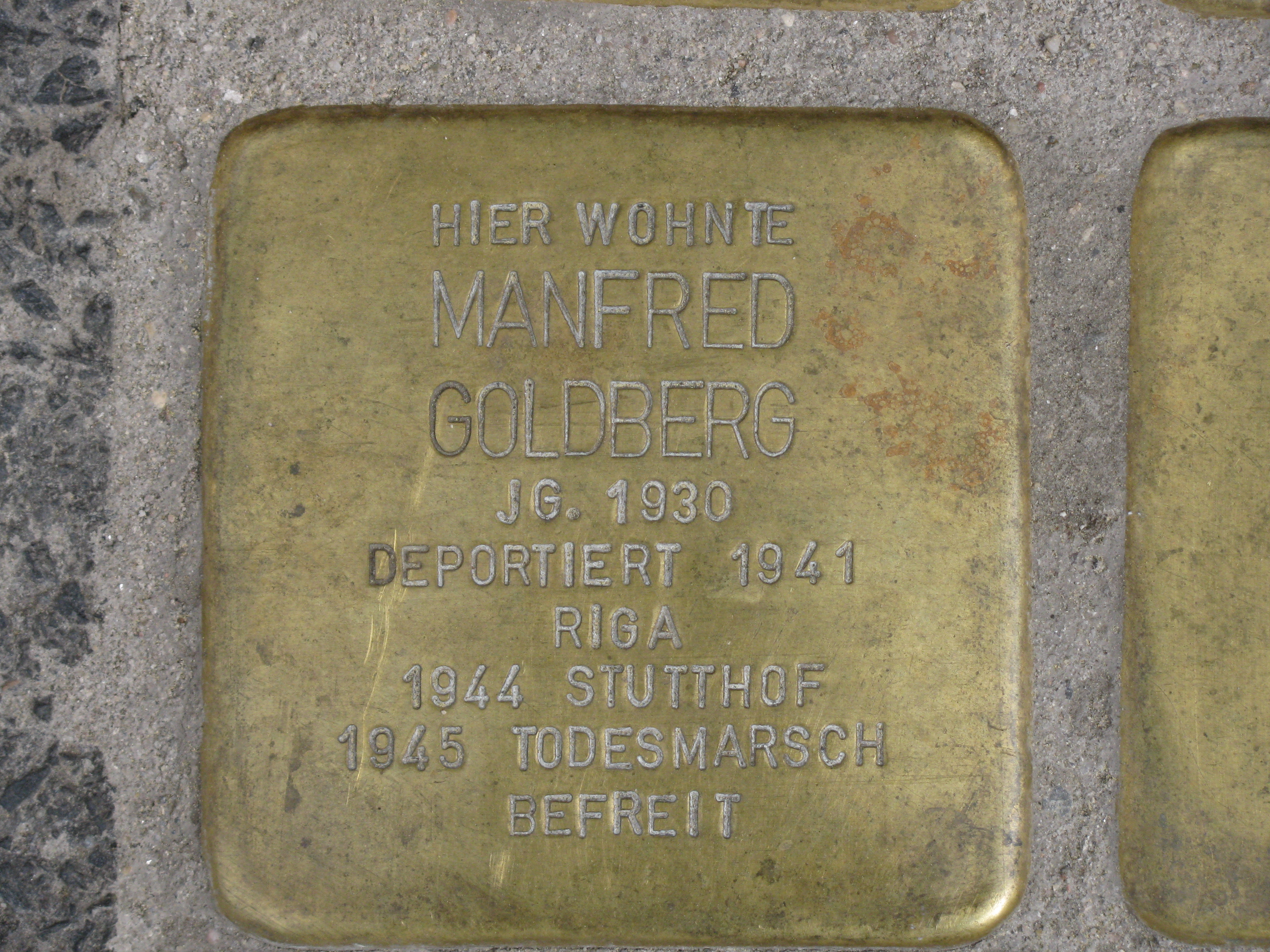
A Stolperstein dedicated to Goldberg on Müllergasse Street in Wesertor, Kassel (pictured in 2018)

Goldberg, together with his mother, moved to North London in September 1946 and was reunited with his father. In North London, he studied at a crammer and worked first at a Jewish bakery and later as an electrician's mate. He learnt English and graduated from Northampton Polytechnic (present-day City St George's, University of London) with a degree in light electronics. After graduation, Goldberg became an electronics engineer. In 1958, he joined Associated Electrical Industries, developing transistors, and later started a central heating installation business. He married Shary Schechter in 1961, with whom he had four children. Goldberg did not speak publicly about his experiences until the 2000s, when in his 70s, his synagogue asked him to give a talk on Tisha B'Av. After that point, he spent the remainder of his life educating and lecturing across the country, working most notably with the Holocaust Educational Trust. In 2024, he became the first participant in Testimony 360, an initiative by the Holocaust Educational Trust in which he answered more than a 1000 questions which were then trained with AI so that he could have virtual conversations with future schoolchildren. The project includes a virtual reality headset that includes footage of key locations in Goldberg's life which are accompanied by audio commentary and explanation from Goldberg.

In July 2017, for the first time since moving to the UK in 1946, Goldberg returned to the Stutthof concentration camp together with fellow survivor and close friend Zigi Shipper, accompanying William, Prince of Wales and Catherine, Princess of Wales (then the Duke and Duchess of Cambridge) on a state visit to Germany and Poland. There, he recited a Jewish memorial prayer for the victims of the camp. In 2018, he returned to Germany for the installation of Stolpersteine for his family on Müllergasse Street in Kassel. During the installation, Goldberg recited the prayer El Malei Rachamim for his late brother Hermann for the first time, acknowledging his death.

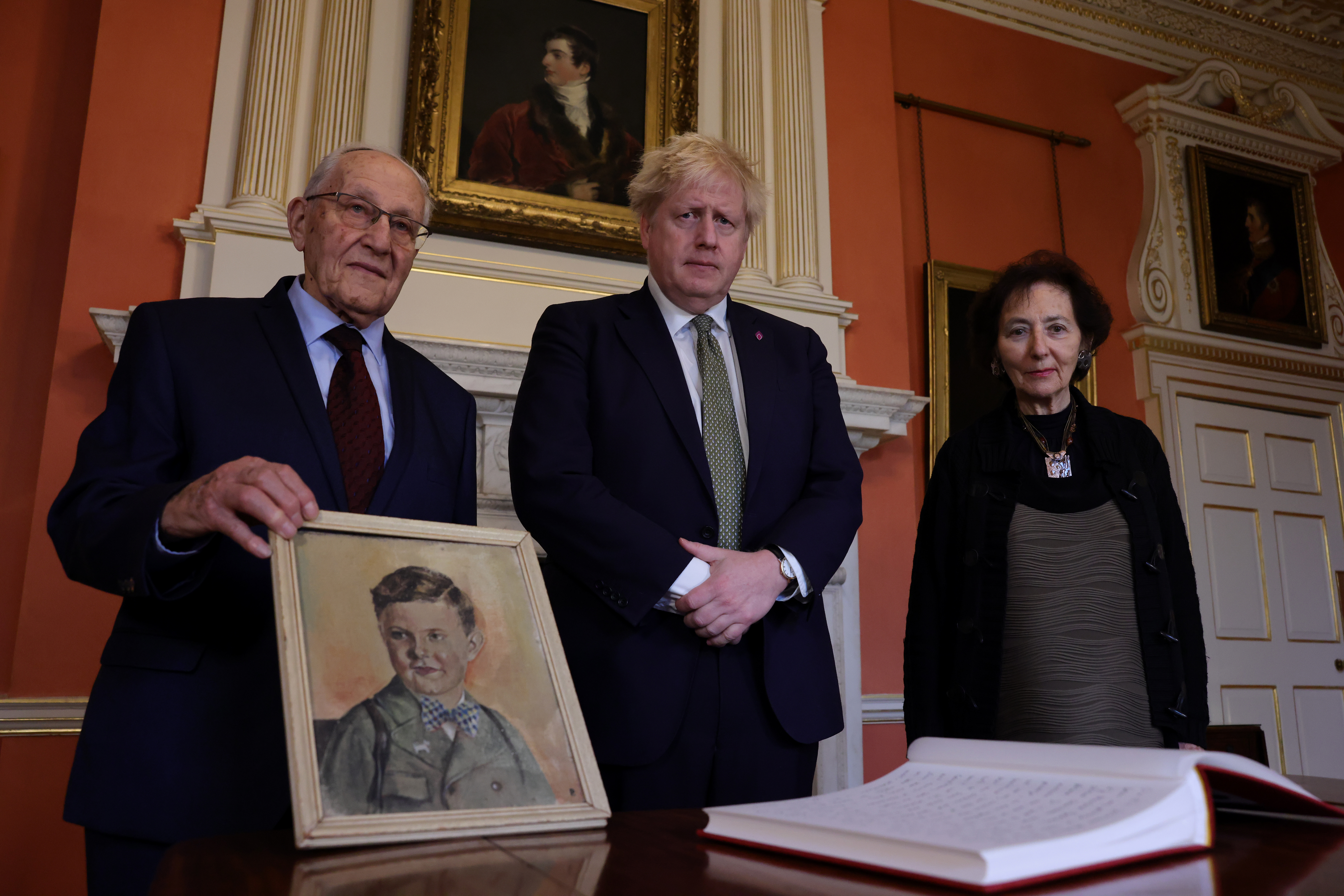
Goldberg and his wife Shary with Prime Minister Boris Johnson during Holocaust Memorial Day in 2022

In January 2022, Goldberg was one of Seven Portraits: Surviving the Holocaust commissioned by the then Prince Charles to commemorate Holocaust Memorial Day.

In January 2023, Frances Segelman created a sculpture of Goldberg's likeness for Yad Vashem UK. Later that month, Goldberg spoke at a Holocaust Memorial Day event co-hosted by the Foreign, Commonwealth and Development Office and the Israeli embassy in the UK. In January 2025, he met King Charles III at Buckingham Palace, shortly before the monarch's visit to Oświęcim to mark the 80th anniversary of the liberation of Auschwitz concentration camp.

In 2020, Goldberg was awarded a British Empire Medal for his services to Holocaust education. In June 2025, he was awarded an MBE by Charles III, for his services to Holocaust remembrance and education.

Goldberg died in London on 6 November 2025, at the age of 95.
