= Helen Aronson =

Polish-born Holocaust survivor

Helen Aronson BEM
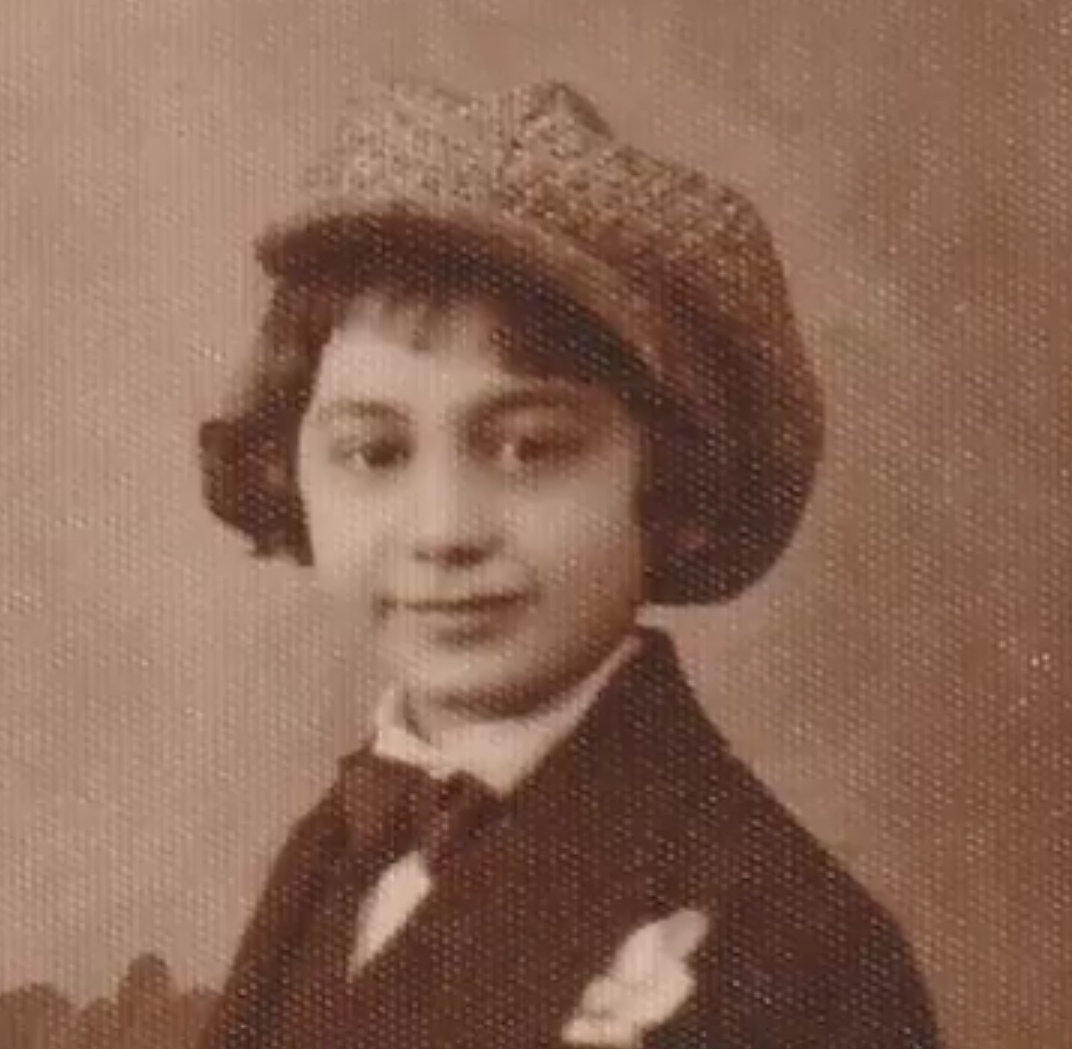
- as a girl
- Born: Helen Chmura; April 24, 1927 (age 99); Pabianice, Poland
- Other name: Helena Stella Aronson
- Citizenship: Polish-British
- Occupations: Holocaust educator; public speaker
- Known for: Survivor of the Pabianice Ghetto and Łódź Ghetto; Holocaust education
- Awards: British Empire Medal BEM; Jewish Care Topland Business Luncheon Award (2019)

Helen Stella Aronson, BEM (née Chmura; born 24 April 1927) is a Polish-born Holocaust survivor from Pabianice who endured the Pabianice Ghetto and the Litzmannstadt (Łódź) Ghetto during the German occupation of Poland. She is one of approximately 750 Jews who survived the liquidation of the Łódź Ghetto out of the roughly 250,000 imprisoned there. After decades of silence, she began publicly sharing her testimony in the 1990s and has since appeared in documentaries, oral history projects, and Holocaust education programmes. Her portrait is in the Royal Collection.

== Early life ==
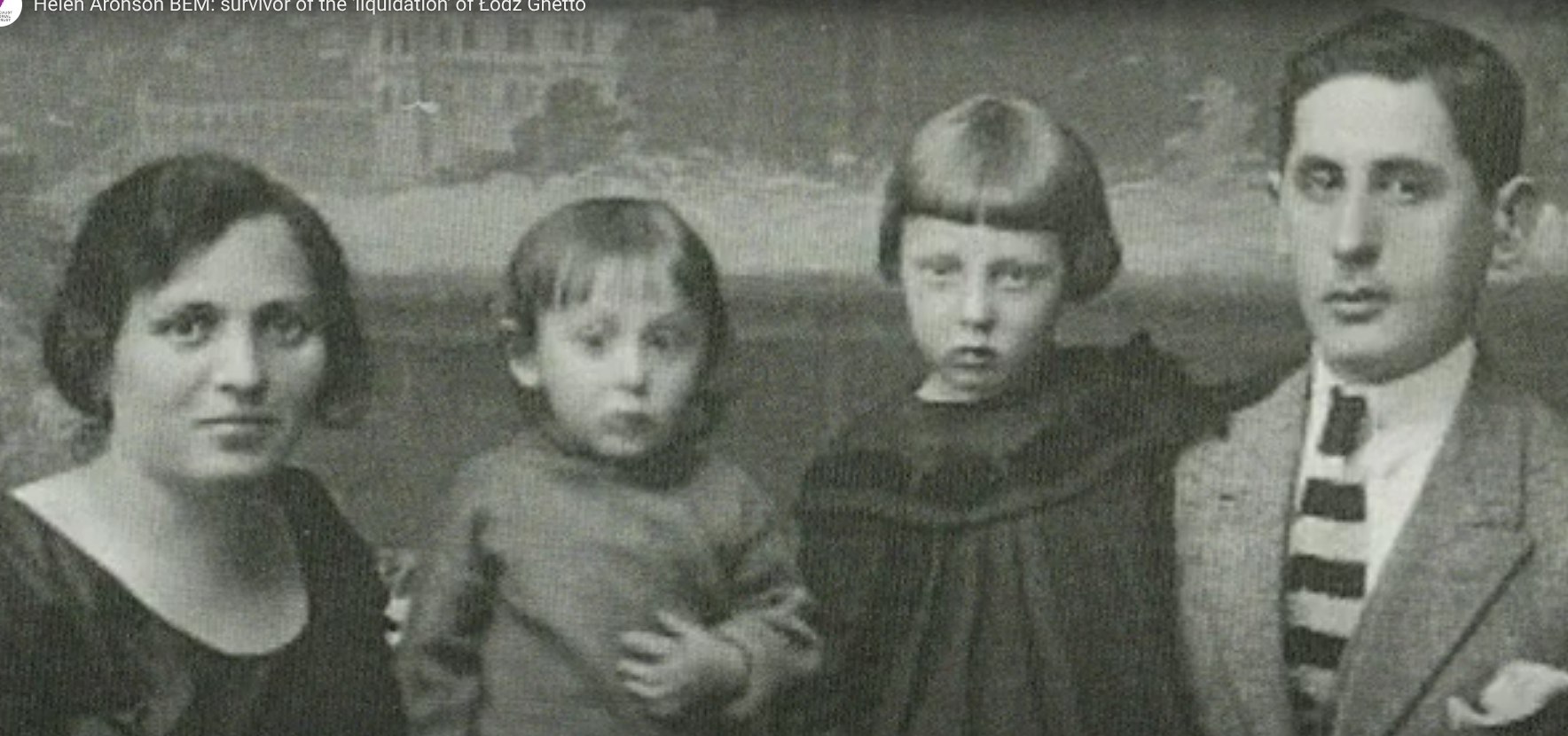
Helen Aronson's family

Aronson was born Helen Chmura on 24 April 1927 in Pabianice, Poland, to Frania (née Katz) and Motush (Mordechai) Chmura. Her father was an accountant in a silk factory and chairman of the local Zionist movement. She had two siblings, Henry and Maryla; the latter emigrated to Palestine in 1937. Aronson later described her childhood as happy and integrated, with both Jewish and non-Jewish friends.

== World War II ==
=== Invasion of Poland and Pabianice Ghetto ===
Germany invaded Poland on 1 September 1939, when Aronson was twelve. Jewish residents of Pabianice were subjected to persecution, including forced labour, the burning of synagogues, and the requirement to wear a yellow star.

In February 1940, the Chmura family was forced into the Pabianice Ghetto, where overcrowding, hunger, and compulsory labour were routine.

=== Liquidation of the Pabianice Ghetto ===
On 16 May 1942, the ghetto was liquidated. During a selection at a football stadium, Aronson, her mother, and her brother were classified as fit for work, while her father was separated from them. He later volunteered to accompany a group of children who had been taken from their parents; he was murdered at the Chełmno extermination camp.

=== Łódź Ghetto ===
Aronson, her mother, and brother were deported to the Łódź Ghetto. Her father had known Chaim Rumkowski, head of the Jewish Council, who arranged accommodation, ration cards, and work assignments for the family.

Aronson worked in an orphanage, then in a sweets factory, and later cleaned the offices of German officials, including Hans Biebow, the Nazi administrator of the ghetto.

Her brother Henry contracted typhoid; during a hospital evacuation by German forces, he survived by hiding inside a chimney for several hours.

=== Final liquidation ===
By May 1944, Łódź was the last remaining ghetto in Poland. Nearly all remaining Jews were deported to extermination camps. Aronson and her family were spared because they were assigned to a “cleanup” detail, sorting the belongings of deported residents for shipment to Germany.

She was among roughly 750 survivors present when the Red Army liberated the ghetto in 1945.

== Post-war life ==
After liberation, Aronson eventually emigrated to Britain, arriving in September 1946. She remained silent about her wartime experiences until 1992, when she gave her first full testimony to the United States Holocaust Memorial Museum.

She later became active in Holocaust education, speaking in schools, community events, and remembrance programmes. She has appeared in documentary films about the Łódź Ghetto and participated in oral history projects, including AJR Refugee Voices.

== Honours ==
Year	Honour	Honours list	Notes
2019	British Empire Medal (BEM)	2019 New Year Honours	For services to Holocaust education.
2019	-	Jewish Care's Topland Business Luncheon Award	-

== Portraits commissioned by HRH The Prince of Wales ==
In 2022, Aronson was one of seven Holocaust survivors selected to have their portraits painted for a special royal commission initiated by the Prince of Wales (later King Charles III).

The project, titled Seven Portraits: Surviving the Holocaust, was conceived as a living memorial to the dwindling generation of survivors and as a tribute to their contributions to Holocaust education.

Aronson’s portrait was painted by British artist Paul Benney.

All seven completed portraits were first exhibited at the Queen’s Gallery, Buckingham Palace from 27 January to 13 February 2022, coinciding with Holocaust Memorial Day (UK).

The other Holocaust survivors featured in the series were: Lily Ebert, Manfred Goldberg, Arek Hersh, Anita Lasker-Wallfisch, Ruzena Levy, and Zigi Shipper.

The portraits moved to Holyrood Palace. and they have not been seen in public since that second exhibit. The portraits entered the Royal Collection and are overseen by the Royal Collection Trust. On Holocaust Memorial Day 2026, holocaust survivors and their families were invited to Buckingham Palace by King Charles III. The King was showing the portraits he had commissioned.

== Legacy ==
Aronson is regarded as an important witness to the history of the Łódź Ghetto. Her testimony is used widely in educational programmes in the United Kingdom, and she remains active in efforts to combat antisemitism and genocide denial.
