= Harry Olmer =

Polish-born British Holocaust survivor and educator (1927–2026)

Harry Olmer MBE
- Born: Chaim Olmer; 15 November 1927; Sosnowiec, Poland
- Died: 15 January 2026 (aged 98); United Kingdom
- Citizenship: British
- Occupations: Dentist; Holocaust educator
- Known for: Survivor of multiple Nazi camps; member of The Boys (Holocaust survivors)
- Children: 4 children and 8 grandchildren
- Awards: British Empire Medal (2018); Member of the Order of the British Empire (2023)

Harry Olmer MBE (born Chaim Olmer; 15 November 1927 – 15 January 2026) was a Polish-born British Holocaust survivor, dentist and educator. He survived Nazi forced-labour and concentration camps, including Płaszów, Skarżysko-Kamienna, Buchenwald, Schlieben, and Terezín. After the war he was brought to the United Kingdom as one of The Boys, a group of child survivors rehabilitated in the Lake District. In later life he became a prominent speaker on Holocaust education and was appointed MBE for his work.

== Early life ==
Harry Olmer was born in Sosnowiec, Poland on 15 November 1927, the fourth of six children. After the Invasion of Poland in 1939, antisemitic persecution intensified. In 1940 the family fled to the village of Miechów-Charsznica, where Jews were subjected to forced labour.

In 1942, Jews from the region were rounded up. During a selection, women and children were deported to Bełżec and murdered on arrival. Olmer, his brother, and his father were selected for forced labour.

== Holocaust ==
=== Płaszów ===
Olmer was deported to the Płaszów forced-labour camp in Kraków, where he worked on railway construction.

=== Skarżysko-Kamienna ===
He was later transferred to the Skarżysko-Kamienna HASAG munitions camp, where prisoners filled shells and mines with toxic chemicals. Thousands died from poisoning, disease, starvation, and shootings during selections.

=== Buchenwald and Schlieben ===
In July 1944 he was transported to Buchenwald and then to its subcamp Schlieben, where HASAG operated another weapons factory.

=== Terezín and liberation ===
In April 1945, as the Red Army advanced, Olmer was moved to Terezín, where he was liberated on 8 May 1945.

== Post-war life ==
After recovery, Olmer was brought to the United Kingdom in 1945 as part of the group later known as The Boys or The Windermere Boys. The story of this group was later documented in a 2020 film The Windermere Children by the BBC.

Olmer lived initially near Windermere in the Lake District, learned English, and completed his education. He qualified as a dentist in 1950 and later served in the British Army.

He married, raised four children, and had eight grandchildren. In retirement he became a dedicated Holocaust educator, speaking widely in schools, universities, and public forums.

Olmer was able in the 1950s to reunite with his sister Sara in Israel. After surviving the war she had married one of the young men who had been protected by Oskar Schindler. A brother had also survived and gone to the United States..

Olmer died 15 January 2026, at the age of 98.

== Honours ==
Olmer was recognised in the King's first New Years Honours list 2023, with an MBE for his service to Holocaust education.

| Year | Honour | Honours list | Notes |
|---|---|---|---|
| 2018 | British Empire Medal ( BEM) | 2018 New Year Honours | For services to Holocaust education. |
| 2023 | Member of the Order of the British Empire ( MBE) | 2023 New Year Honours | For services to Holocaust education. |

== Legacy ==
Olmer is remembered as one of the most active Holocaust educators in the United Kingdom. His testimony is preserved by the Holocaust Educational Trust, the Lake District Holocaust Project, and the MyVoice initiative.

== See also ==
- Holocaust survivors
- Kindertransport
- The Windermere Children
- Holocaust education
- Holocaust Educational Trust
