= Gunter Sachs =

German photographer, author, and industrialist (1932–2011)

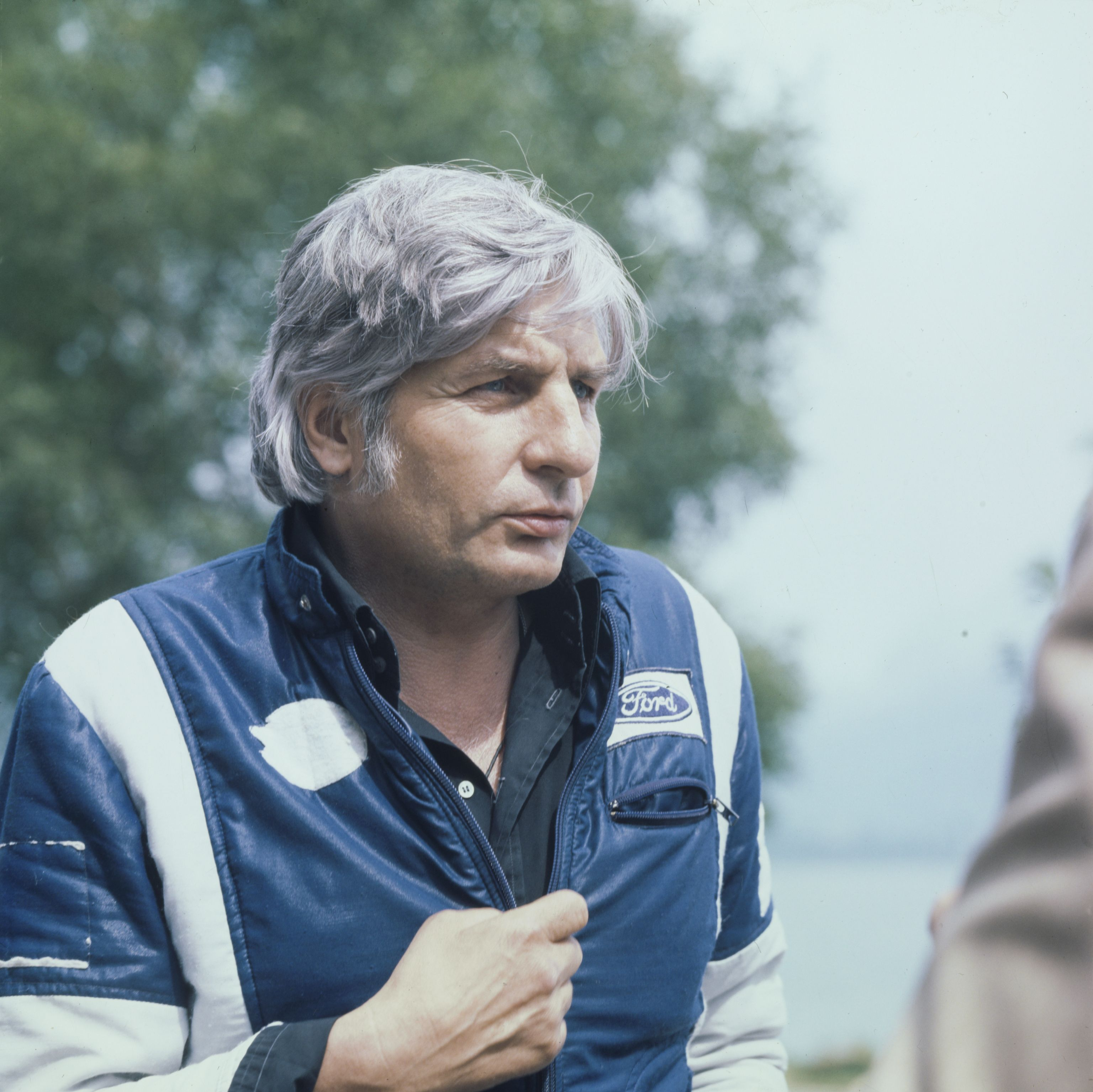
- Sachs in 1978
- Born: Fritz Gunter Sachs; 14 November 1932; Schonungen, Germany
- Died: 7 May 2011 (aged 78); Gstaad, Switzerland
- Citizenship: Germany; Switzerland
- Education: Institut auf dem Rosenberg
- Occupations: Industrial heir, socialite, art collector, photographer, author
- Spouses: Annemarie Faure (m. 1956; died 1958) Brigitte Bardot (m. 1966; div. 1969) Mirja Larsson (m. 1969)
- Children: 3, including Rolf
- Relatives: Wilhelm von Opel (grandfather); Fritz von Opel (uncle)

Signature
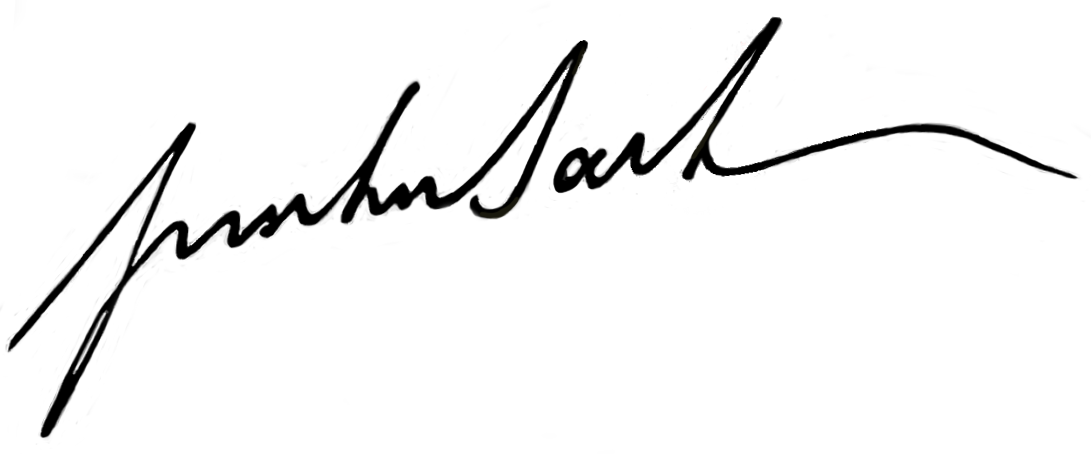

Fritz Gunter Sachs (14 November 1932 – 7 May 2011), also known as Gunter Sachs von Opel, was a German and Swiss industrial heir, socialite, art collector, photographer, and author.

He was primarily known for his jet set lifestyle in St. Moritz and St. Tropez and then gained international fame as a documentary film-maker, documentary photographer, and as third husband of Brigitte Bardot.

== Early life and education ==
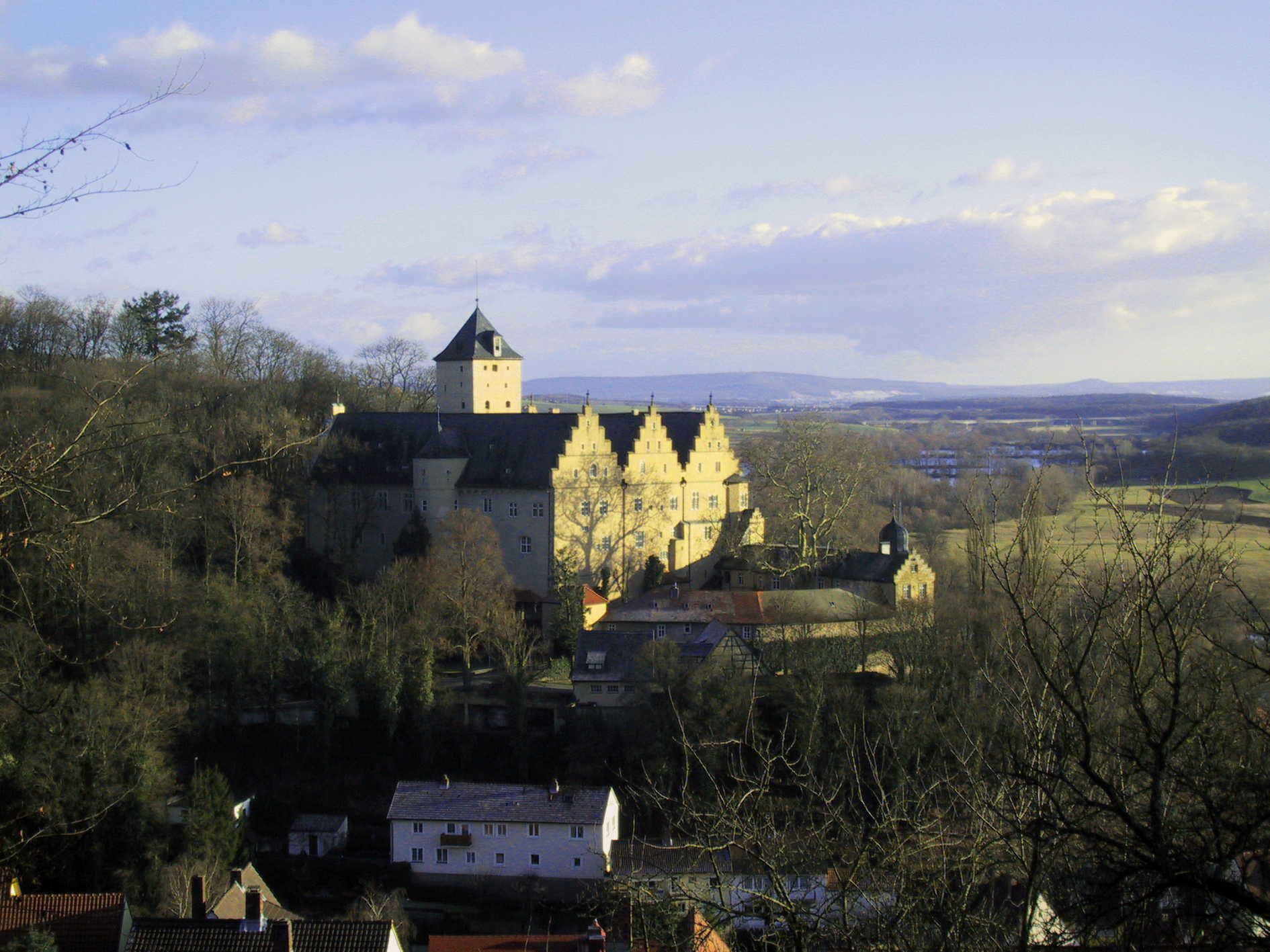
Schloss Mainberg near Schweinfurt, Gunter Sachs's birthplace

Sachs was born on 14 November 1932 at Schloss Mainberg in Schonungen, Bavaria, Germany. He was the second of two sons born to Willy Sachs, an industrialist and sole owner of automotive parts manufacturer Fichtel & Sachs, and Elinor von Opel (1908–2001), an heiress to the auto maker Opel. He had an elder brother, Ernst Wilhelm Sachs (1929–1977), who died in an avalanche.

His parents divorced in 1935. In 1957, Gunter's father adopted the son of his common-law wife, giving Sachs a younger half-brother, Peter Sachs (né Hirnböck; born 1950). Sachs was educated in Switzerland, at Institut auf dem Rosenberg in St.Gallen, and at Lyceum Alpinum Zuoz near St. Moritz.

== Art collector ==
In 1958, before he was financially secure, Sachs moved to Paris, where he earned money playing Écarté. He spent his winnings on art; his collection eventually included works by Jean Fautrier, Andy Warhol, René Magritte, Salvador Dalí, Roy Lichtenstein, Tom Wesselmann, Mel Ramos, and Allen Jones. He also owned important pieces from the Nouveau réalisme school including Yves Klein, Jean Tinguely, Arman, and Martial Raysse. Many of these artists were involved in the 1969 design of the legendary pop-art-apartment in the tower of the Palace Hotel in St. Moritz, which quickly gained the art world's attention.

In 1967, with Prince Konstantin of Bavaria, Sachs co-founded the Modern Art Museum in Munich (MAM) and remained its president until 1975. In 1972, he opened his own gallery in Hamburg; from this gallery, he launched Andy Warhol into the European market and, in 1974, commissioned Warhol to produce a series of silkscreen portraits of Brigitte Bardot. In May 2006, Sachs sold one of Warhol's silk screens of Bardot at auction for $3 million. The Sachs family sold part of his collection through a Sotheby's auction in May 2012; the sale achieved £36.5 million.

== Photographer ==
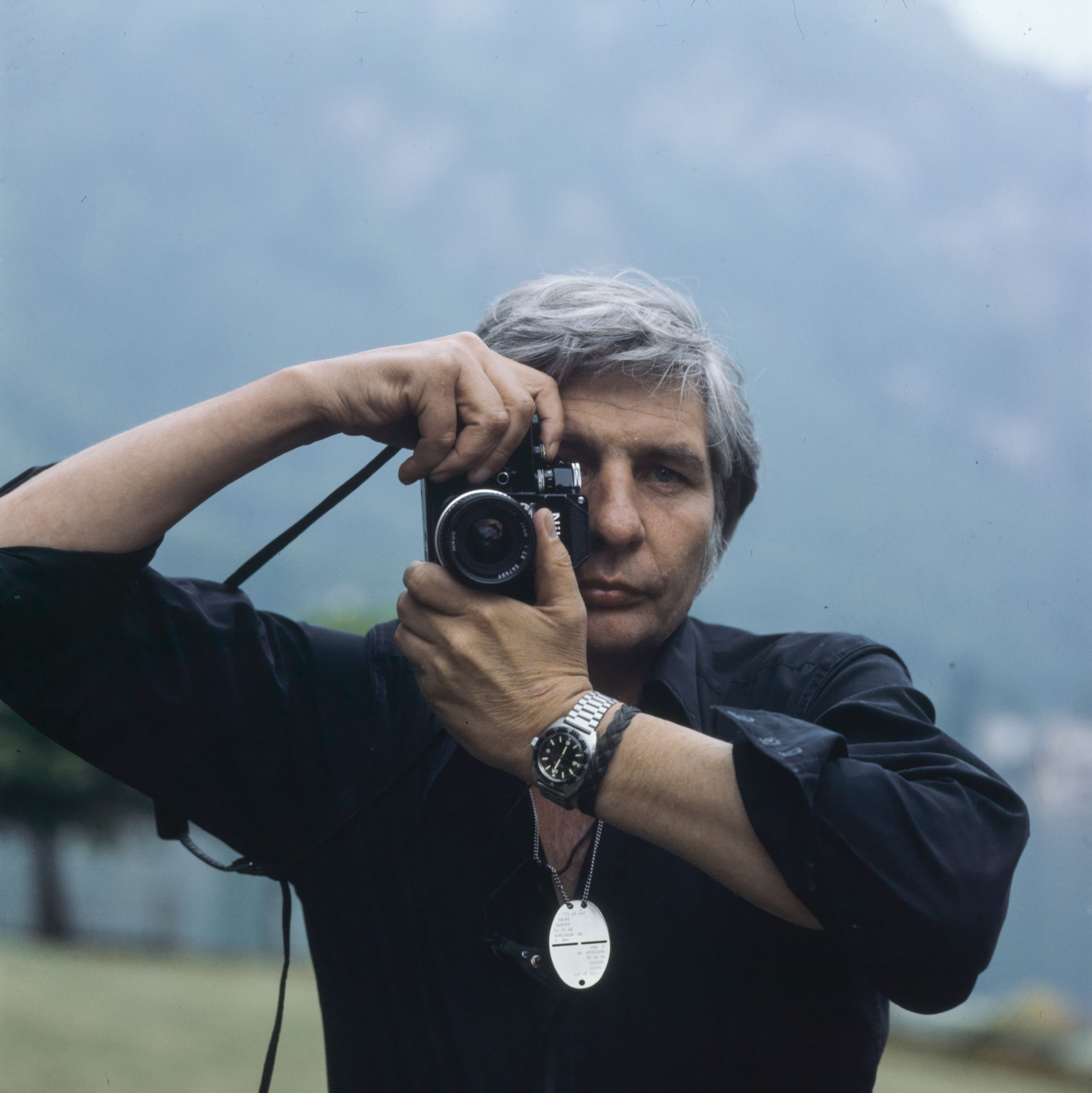
Gunter Sachs (1978)

In the 1950s, Sachs began to experiment with black and white photography. In 1972, he received some commissions from Vogue France and, in 1973, shot that magazine's first nude photograph. He became known for images of women, in scenes set against sky, water and sand. He gained international recognition in 1974 with a special show at the photokina show, for which he also designed the official exhibition poster. Also in 1974, he released his first book of photographs, Mädchen in meinen Augen (Girls in my Eyes). In 1976 he was awarded the Leica Prize. In 1982, he released his second book of photographs, Mirror Images. A third, Gunter Sachs was released in 1990.

In 1991 he worked with Claudia Schiffer on the "Heroines" series. He was drawn to Surrealism and experimented with long exposures and high-speed camera technology, and he was one of the first artists to create digital image compositions, which were first shown in 1995. At the 'German photo days' and the photokina he received prizes for "Die Farbe Weiss" in 1994 and for "Die Farbe Rot" in 1995.

The proceeds from the sale of his photographs and illustrated books went to the Mirja-Sachs Foundation, which he and his wife founded in 1987 to help children in need.

== Astrological research ==
In 1998, Sachs published the book The Astrology File: Scientific Proof of the Link Between the Star Signs and Human Behaviour. Sachs's methodology and statistical analysis were criticized by mathematicians, who found errors in all parts and deny any statistical significance, after making the necessary corrections in his data.

== Personal life and death ==
In 1956, Sachs married firstly French-born Anne-Marie Faure (1934–1958), an art student, who died only two years later from anesthesia failure after a car crash. They had one son;

- Rolf Sachs (born 1955), an artist and designer, married to Maryam Banihashem, has three children.

In 1966, he married secondly French actress Brigitte Bardot (1934–2025) in Las Vegas, with whom he had no children. They were divorced in 1969.

On 26 November 1969, Sachs married thirdly the former Swedish model Mirja Larsson (born 1943), in a civil ceremony in St. Moritz, Switzerland. The ceremonial wedding was announced to happen in the grounds of Sachs's estate in Bavaria. They had two sons;

- Christian Gunnar Sachs (born 1971)
- Claus Alexander Sachs (born 1982)

He was an avid bobsledder, winning the Junior European Championship in 1959. He was Vice President of the Cresta Run, and Chairman of the St. Moritz Bobsleigh Club from 1969 until his death. Turn 13 of the St. Moritz-Celerina Olympic Bobrun is named after him.

In 1976, Sachs and his elder brother Ernst Wilhelm became Swiss citizens by official payment of 6,000 Swiss francs (equivalent to 15,000–18,000 Swiss francs in 2026) each to the municipality of Surcuolm (presently Obersaxen Mundaun). Additionally they became tax residents for at least one year which resulted in tax revenue of 300,000 Swiss francs (equivalent to 750,000–900,000 Swiss francs in 2026), which was more than ten times as much tax revenue as usual for the poor mountain village. The Sachs brothers also donated 100,000 Swiss francs (equivalent to 250,000–300,000 Swiss francs in 2026) to renovate the Catholic church in the village.

On 7 May 2011, at his home in Gstaad, Sachs died by a self-inflicted gunshot wound. In his suicide note, he explained that his actions were due to his having what he called "hopeless illness A", which may have been Alzheimer's,) adding that "The loss of mental control over my life was an undignified condition, which I decided to counter decisively". He was a dual citizen of Switzerland and Germany.

== Literature ==
- Sachs, Gunter: The Astrology File: Scientific Proof of the Link Between Star Signs and Human Behaviour. Orion Books (December 1999). ISBN 0-7528-1789-2
- Elwell, Dennis: Cosmic Loom, 2nd edition 1999. The Urania Trust. ISBN 0-04-133027-7. Discussion and interpretation of some of Gunter Sachs' results and related material.
