= Massimiliano Pironti =

Italian painter (born 1981)

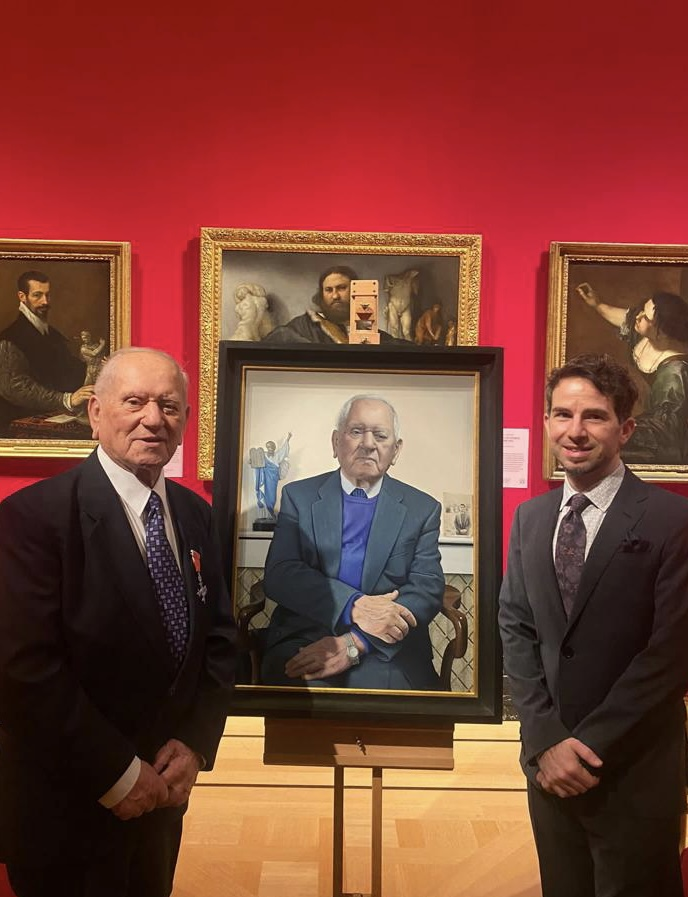
Arek Hersh and artist Massimiliano Pironti at The Queen's Gallery

Massimiliano Pironti (born 22 December 1981 in Colleferro, Province of Rome) is an Italian painter and former actor, singer and dancer.

== Life ==
As an autodidact he learned to paint, after he began studies in singing, classical ballet, modern and contemporary dance and earned a reputation initially in Italy and later in Germany as a musical performer. Since 2018 he is a painter of international reputation, especially in Great Britain, Germany and Italy. His focus is to represent the inner life of the human figure and to tell the story of peoples lives.

He came to fame as the 11th winner of the Italian National Prize "Massimini" as best musical and light opera performer 2008.

In March 2018, the jury of the BP Portrait Award selected Massimiliano's oil painting A throne in the West among 48 submissions. A throne in the West was part of the BP Portrait Award 2018 special exhibit at the National Portrait Gallery, London. In 2019 Pironti won the third prize in the BP Portrait Award, with a portrait entitled Quo vadis? of his 95-year-old grandmother and the second prize in the visitor's choice award from the NPG London. This competition is the world's biggest for portrait painting.

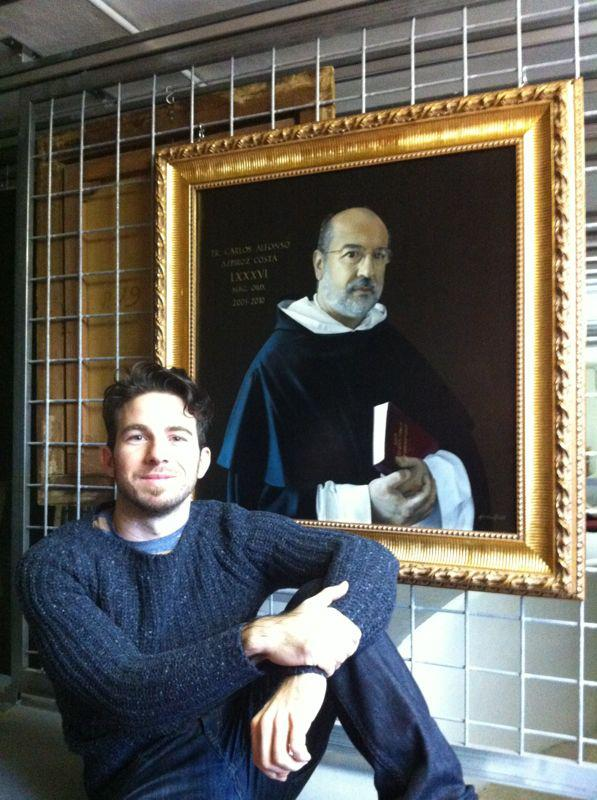
Portrait of the former Master of the Dominican Order Carlos Azpiroz OP in the Museum of Santa Sabina, Italy, Rome

On the occasion of the 250th jubilee of the poet Friedrich Hölderlin Pironti painted his interpretation of Hölderlin for the permanent collection of the Hölderlin Museum in Lauffen a. N. /Germany, in the house of Hölderlin's birth. A copy of the painting was presented to Pope Francis, who gratefully honored the painting and museum with greetings and reflections about the poet.

In 2021 Massimiliano was commissioned by HRH The Prince of Wales to paint the portrait of Holocaust survivor Arek Hersh, as part of the project-exhibition “Seven Portraits: Surviving the Holocaust”. The portrait, part of the Royal Collection, is on display at The Queen’s Gallery, Buckingham Palace and at The Queen's Gallery, Palace of Holyroodhouse, in Edinburgh. Their Royal Highnesses The Prince of Wales, now HM King Charles III and Duchess Camilla, now Queen Camilla, unveiled the display at the Queen's Gallery, today King's Gallery, to mark Holocaust Memorial Day 2022.

Massimiliano created and donated a symbol of peace to the international project of peace and reconciliation "Peacebells for Europe", which was in 2023 shown in a cinema documentary.

His painting "Quo vadis?" was bought in 2023 from "The Friends of Kunstmuseum Stuttgart" for the permanent collection of the Kunstmuseum Stuttgart in Germany and is on display in the Otto Dix hall.

His painting "Agnese" of a dancer with alopecia was part of the Herbert Smith Freehills Portrait Award show in the National Portrait Gallery, London.

2024 the commission for art of Eberhard Karls University Tübingen, Germany commissioned the official portrait of University President Prof. Dr. Dr. h.c. Bernd Engler for Universities official Gallery, one of the oldest and biggest in the world. Prof. Dr. h.c. mult. Reinhold Würth, patron of arts, supported generously the commission now on display in the show of the University museum.

== Appearances ==
- In 2004/2005, Pironti took part in the final of the Italian TV talent show Amici.
- In 2005, he produced and choreographed the dance show Collezione Privata in Rome, in which he also appeared as a dancer.
- In 2006, he appeared in the Italian film Passo a due.
- In 2007/2008, he played Pollo in the musical production Three Steps Above Heaven by Palazzo Irreale.
- In 2008/2009, he played Peter Pan in Peter Pan The Musical by Teatro delle Erbe.
- In 2009/2010, Pironti was Mungo Jerry in the musical Cats by Compagnia della Rancia.
- In 2010/2011, he played Jimmy Kaminsky in the musical Flashdance by Stage Entertainment.
- In 2011/2012, he was TJ in the musical Sister Act by Stage Entertainment.
- In 2012/2013, he played Bobby C. in the musical Saturday Night Fever by Stage Entertainment.
- In 2014/2015, he was a performer in Best of Musical by Stage Entertainment and Christian in the musical Come E&O,è tutto uno show by Nito Production, as well as in the TV show Chance as singer and dancer on the Italian Agon Channel.
- In 2015/2016/2017 Pironti was Terk in Disney's Musical Tarzan by Stage Entertainment in Stuttgart and Oberhausen, Germany.
- In 2019 Pironti was portrayed as a painter in the TV production Portrait of an Artist from Lonelyleap Film on BBC World News and Amazon Prime.
- In 2020 The Times presented in first publication his portrait of Mafalda of Hesse in print and online on the occasion of the Royal Society of Portrait Painters annual exhibition in The Mall Galleries, London.
- In 2022 Pironti took part in the documentary “Survivors: Portraits of the Holocaust” for BBC two and BBC World News.
- 2022 – TV Podcast talking about Pironti in programme „KUNSCHT“ titled "A painting for Prince Charles- the artist Massimiliano Pironti and his oil paintings" original title in German: Gemälde für Prinz Charles - der Stuttgarter Künstler Massimiliano Pironti und seine Ölporträts, broadcast from SWR, 3SAT, ARD in Germany
- 2023 – TV Podcast talking about Pironti in programme SWR Kultur titled "Portrait of grandmother: Massimiliano Pironti's Quo vadis? original title in German Porträt der Großmutter: Massimiliano Pirontis "Quo vadis?" broadcast from SWR, 3SAT, ARD in Germany
- 2023 – Cinema Documentary with Pironti participating "Peacebells for Europe" original title in German „Friedens Glocken für Europa“ from Dominik Wessely, TELLUX film. Massimiliano created and donated a symbol of peace for the Peacebells.

== Works ==
- In 2005, Massimiliano Pironti wrote, produced and choreographed the dance show Collezione Privata.
- The official portrait in oil of the former Master of the Dominican Order Carlos Azpiroz Costa OP, that hangs in the Dominican Museum in the Santa Sabina basilica in Rome, Italy.
- Oil on aluminium, title A throne in the West, part of the special exhibit BP Portrait Award 2018 in the National Portrait Gallery, London and from 13 March 2019 in The Gallery, Winchester.
- Oil on canvas, title D'après Albert Joseph Pénot pour les Ghost Riders du Dracula, 1000mmx600mm, since December 2018 in the Dracula Club (Cresta Run/ St. Moritz Celerina Olympic Bobrun) from Rolf Sachs in St. Moritz, Switzerland.
- Oil on aluminium, title Quo vadis?, part of the special exhibit BP Portrait Award 2019 in the National Portrait Gallery, London. Now part of the collection of Kunstmuseum Stuttgart in Germany
- Oil on aluminium, title Friedrich Hölderlin, 900 mm x 740 mm, part of the permanent collection in the Hölderlin Museum in Lauffen a. N. /Germany.
- Oil on aluminium, title Arek Hersh, 600 mm x 800 mm, part of the Royal Collection of the British royal family.
- Oil on aluminium, title Bernd Engler, 850mm x 600mm part of the permanent collection of the University museum, Tübingen, Germany.
