= Trevor Avery =

British artist

Trevor Avery BEM is an artist, curator and producer who has been based in London, the Highlands of Scotland, and is now in the North West of England.

== Career ==
Trevor Avery serves as director of Another Space, which initiated and now produces the Lake District Holocaust Project (LDHP). LDHP is based in Windermere at the heart of the Lake District, England.

Since 2005, he has been involved in an ongoing project looking at the connections and legacy of the story of the 300 child survivors of the Holocaust, who came to the Lake District of England in 1945 directly after liberation from the concentration camps of Nazi Occupied Europe. In 2019, the Lake District Holocaust Project commissioned a documentary about their story called Route to Paradise.

The "Flowers of Auschwitz" exhibition in 2015 showcased a collection of drawings created by children liberated from Auschwitz in 1945, curated by the Soviet soldier and artist Zinovii Tolkatchev. This initiative inspired the "Auschwitz Dandelion" exhibition project in 2017, which focused on the Raisko sub-camp of Auschwitz. This project delved into the historical context of experiments aimed at utilizing Russian Dandelion sap in global rubber production, particularly for motor tires. At Raisko camp, women were subjected to slave labour as part of Nazi efforts during World War Two to develop rubber from the Russian Dandelion.

From 2016 to 2017 he curated "Holocaust and Memory Reframed" in the Lake District. Supported by Arts Council England, the two-year programme began with an exhibition of The Memory Quilt, a large-scale project made in 2015 by 45 Aid Society. Other artists commissioned to produce work over the two years included Ian Walton, Heather Belcher and Miroslaw Balka.

In 2019, he began work with Professor Caroline Sturdy Colls and Staffordshire University on the National Lottery Heritage Fund project From Troutbeck Bridge to Treblinka http://troutbecktotreblinka.com/, an archaeological survey of the “lost” wartime village of Calgarth Estate that stood at Troutbeck Bridge near Windermere between 1942 and around circa 1964.

The archaeology project coincided with a two-year programme of Arts Council England contemporary art exhibitions in Windermere curated by Another Space/LDHP titled “Above and Below the Holocaust Landscape” and involving artists Richard Kolker, Richard White, Lorna Brunstein and Miroslaw Balka.

He continues to be an advisor to the BBC on TV programmes and has written for Third Text magazine, and curated exhibitions including leading Aboriginal Australian artist Dr Pam Johnston, Tanzanian artist Everlyn Nicodemus and American artists Linda Lomahaftewa (Choctaw-Hopi) and Jimmie Durham

The Windermere Children, a major television film drama produced by BBC, Wall to Wall, Warner Bros and ZDF, and involving the Lake District Holocaust Project, was broadcast in 2020 to coincide with the seventy fifth anniversary of the liberation of Auschwitz, and also the arrival in the Lake District of the three hundred child Holocaust Survivors.

The Windermere Children - In Their Own Words is a documentary for BBC 4 that was commissioned to accompany the film dramatisation. It includes reflections by a number of the Holocaust survivors who were in the Lake District in 1945, and also a personal appearance by Trevor Avery.

== Honours ==
In 2016 Avery was awarded the British Empire Medal (BEM) for Services to Heritage in the Lake District.

== Filmography ==
Year	Film	Role
2020	The Windermere Children	Historical Advisor
2020	Route to Paradise	Factual Producer
