= Rolf Sachs =

Swiss artist and designer

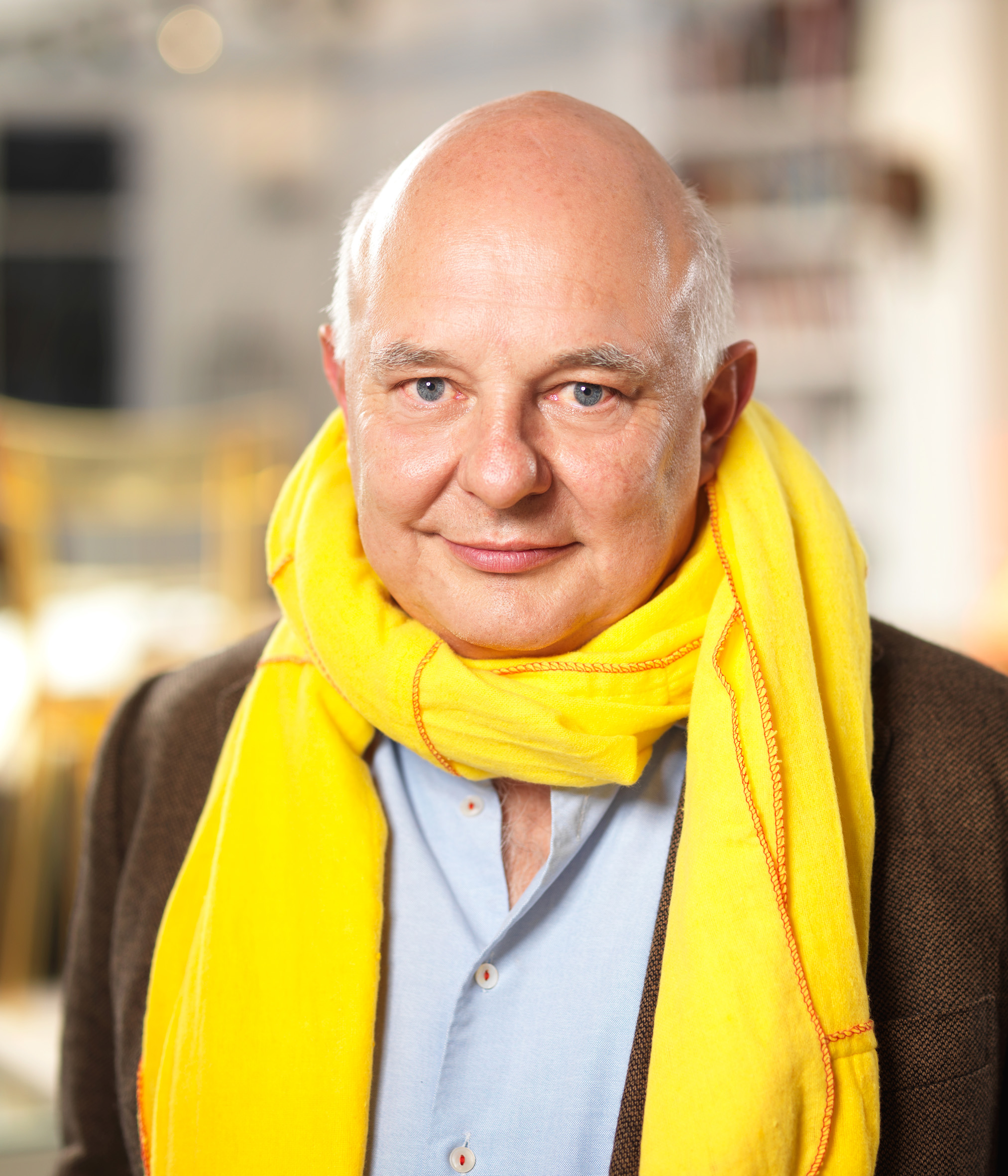
- Rolf Sachs, c. 2013
- Born: Rolf Wilhelm Albert Sachs; 10 August 1955 (age 70); Lausanne, Switzerland
- Citizenship: Switzerland; Germany; France (de facto)
- Education: Institut Le Rosey; Lyceum Alpinum Zuoz
- Alma mater: Menlo College (BA)
- Spouse: Maryam Banihashem (m. 1985; div. 2014)
- Partner: Mafalda von Hessen
- Children: 3
- Father: Gunter Sachs
- Family: Sachs family Opel family
- Website: Official website

Rolf Wilhelm Albert Sachs colloquially Rolf Sachs (born 10 August 1955) is a Swiss artist, designer, art collector and philanthropist. He is the oldest son of Gunter Sachs and a member of the Opel family.

== Early life and education ==
Sachs was born 10 August 1955 in Lausanne, Switzerland, the oldest of three children, of Gunter Sachs, an industrial heir and socialite, and his first wife Anne-Marie Sachs (née Faure; 1934–1958). His mother was originally from France and died from anesthesia error during an operation. He had two younger half-brothers; Christian Gunnar Sachs and "Claus" Alexander Sachs (born 1982).

His paternal family was affluent and associated with a variety of industries. His grandfather was Willy Sachs, an industrialist and majority owner of Fichtel & Sachs, an automotive parts manufacturer. His great-grandfather was Wilhelm von Opel, an engineer and co-founder of the Opel company, as well as son of Adam Opel.

He was educated at Institut Le Rosey and the Lyceum Alpinum Zuoz. From 1975 he started to study economics in London and San Francisco. He holds a Bachelor's degree in Business Administration from Menlo College in Menlo Park, California.

== Career ==
He started his formal career in investment banking before fully committing to the art world. Since 1984 he is also active as furniture designer and since 2006 also as a set designer (theater and movies). He moved to London in 1994 and founded his design studio rolf sachs fun'ction there. According to his own statements, he was heavily influenced by Suprematism, Dadaism, Surrealism, the Nouveau Réalisme group of artists and the artist Joseph Beuys. His penchant for chairs follows on from an extensive collection of chairs begun in the late 1980s. A large special exhibition with design objects that deal with German virtues took place in 2014 in the Museum for Applied Arts in Cologne.

Additionally after his studies he briefly worked for his family's company as specialist and investor for 'alternative investments'. He is still active in the world of finance and investments through his single family office galaxar ag which has offices in Chur and Zug. Also he holds several advisory and board member positions on a national and international level.

== Art and design ==
Rolf Sachs's work moves between art and design, objects, spaces and visual medium. It encourages his audience to question preconceptions and view objects from a different perspective, through an inquisitive and conceptual approach.

Sachs’ work was initially inspired by the principles of minimalism. Restrained decoration, deconstructed right angles and sharp corners were the defining characteristics of his work, predominantly made from felt and solid wood.

His work has changed over the years, becoming more experimental and conceptual and therefore not as definable. He searches for the unconventional and the unexpected, a philosophy reflected in his artistic style.

Rolf Sachs has exhibited at numerous art and design galleries including the MAKK Museum in Cologne, Galerie von Bartha in St Moritz, the Victoria & Albert Museum in London, ammann// gallery at Design Miami Basel, Phillips de Pury & Company New York, Monica Sprüth Cologne and Faggionato Fine Arts in London. His set designs the Faust opera, which debuted at Wiesbaden Staatstheater and the Faust ballet at the Les Ballets de Monte Carlo, which toured globally. In March 2009, Sachs completed the set design for Vincenzo Bellini's “Norma” at the Opera de Monte Carlo.

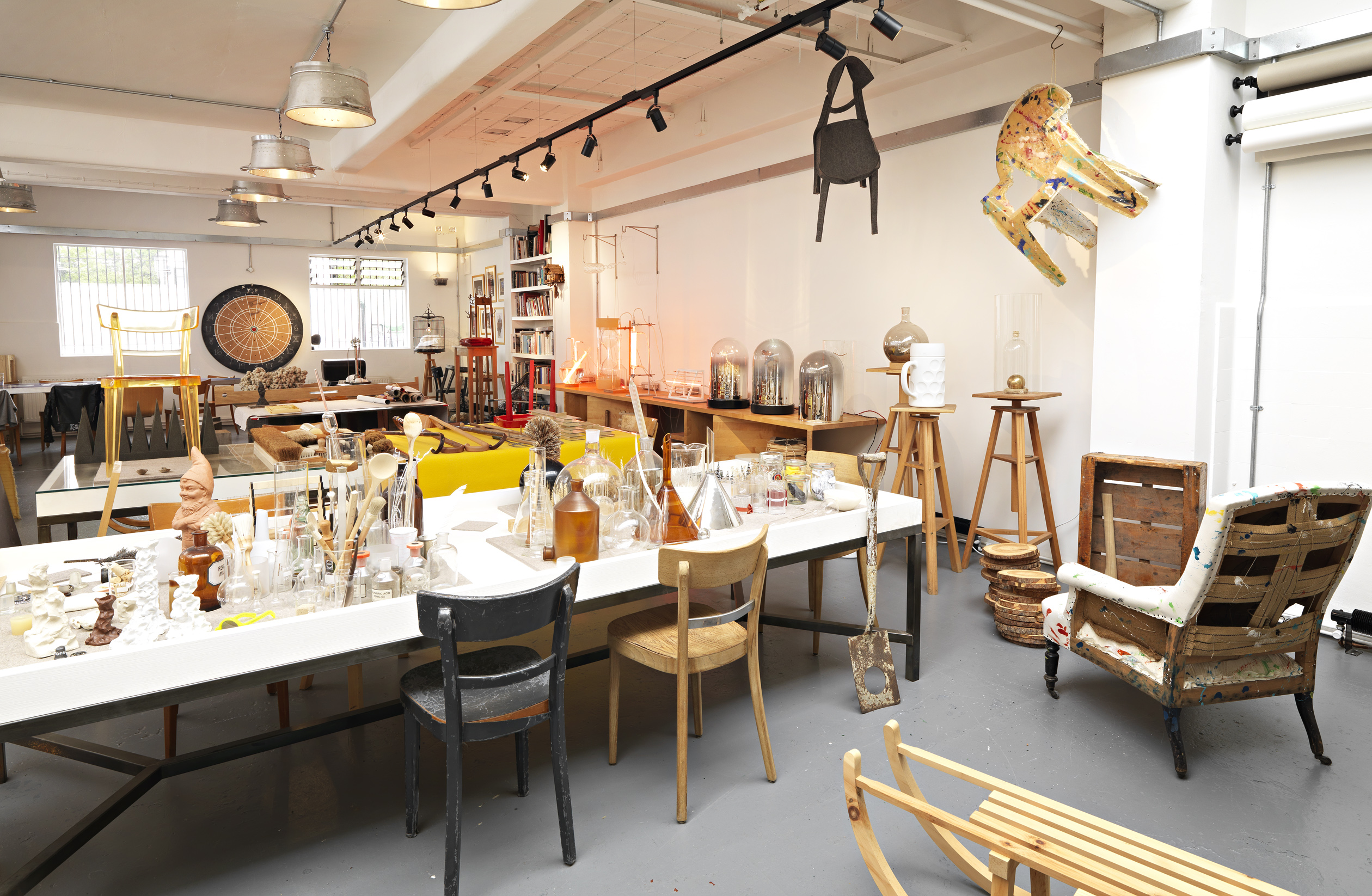

Rolf collaborated with his stepmother Maryam Sachs on developing the concept for the photographic project entitled The Wild Emperor where over a period of a year, a stationary camera captured the Wild Kaiser mountain range outside his house in Bavaria, in 10.5 minute intervals.

At the end of September 2016, Sachs published a yearlong photographic exploration on the UNESCO World Heritage Rhaetian Albula / Bernina Railway line, entitled Camera in Motion: From Chur to Tirano. In this recent project Sachs's photographs were taken from a moving train. These images uncover Sachs's experimental approach to photography and challenge the viewer to step towards an unknown reality. The book features 87 photographs and includes texts by Bill Kouwenhoven and Helen Chislett, and is published by Kehrer Verlag.

In October 2016, Sachs designed the Leica M-P (Typ 240) special edition 'grip' by Rolf Sachs, in collaboration with Leica Camera AG. The new, limited edition, model unites the iconic rangefinder technology with artistic product design with a combination of unusual materials and the artist's signature bright red colour palette.

== Personal life ==
In 1985, Sachs married Iranian-born Maryam Banihashem (born 1961), an author and publisher, originally from Tehran. They had three children together;

- Philipp Sachs (born 1986)
- Frederik Sachs (born 1988)
- Roya Sachs (born 1991)

In 1994, Sachs moved his family to London, where they lived until 2018. In 2014, Sachs separated from his wife, with a divorce being finalized the same year. He has ever since been in a relationship with Princess Mafalda of Hesse (born 1965), sister of the Head of the House of Hesse, Heinrich Donatus of Hesse, who is husband to Floria Countess of Faber-Castell. Sachs currently resides with her in Rome, Italy, and St. Moritz, Switzerland.
