= Arek Hersh =

Polish-British Holocaust survivor (born 1928)

Arek Hersh MBE
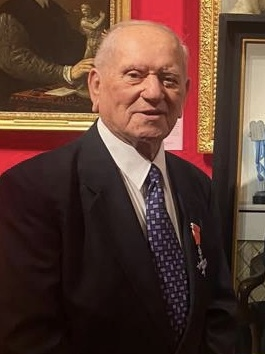
- Arek Hersh at Buckingham Palace, 2022
- Born: 13 September 1928 (age 97); Sieradz, Poland
- Known for: Surviving the Holocaust

Arek Hersh MBE (born 13 September 1928) is a Polish-born British-Jewish survivor of the Holocaust who has been honoured for his services to Holocaust education.

== Early life and World War II ==
Arek Hersh (né Herszlikowicz - הרשליקוביץ׳) was born in Sieradz, Poland, on 13 September 1928. He was the son of a bootmaker for the Polish army and a homemaker. At the age of eleven, following Nazi Germany's invasion of Poland, he was taken to his first Nazi concentration camp. The camp started out with 2,500 men; eighteen months later only eleven were alive. Hersh was moved around several camps before being taken to Auschwitz. Even as a young boy at the time, Hersh deduced that those who were placed in a group with sick, young or old people were considered by the Nazis to be of no use and would be killed. Consequently, while Jews were standing in two queues of fitter and weaker people before entering the camp, Hersh crossed to the fitter queue during a commotion near the rear of the line (SS officers tried to take a child from its mother), and in doing so, saved his own life. As the war approached its conclusion and Germany was surrounded by the Allies, Hersh and the other Jews at Auschwitz were transported across the country. He was eventually liberated at Theresienstadt (Terezin, Czechoslovakia) on 8 May 1945 by the Soviet Army. There were 5,000 Jews in his town but only 40 of them came out alive.

The night before he was liberated, Hersh and a few other survivors found an unguarded German warehouse, from which they took as much food as they wanted; they ate so much that their stomachs hurt due to the sudden intake of rich fatty foods which they had lacked for so long. For Hersh, it was his first taste of chocolate in five years. The Soviet soldiers let all of the surviving Jews do whatever they wanted with the Germans; Arek took the captain's food to show him how it felt to starve.

Hersh was included in a group of 300 Holocaust-surviving children who, following their liberation, were brought to the Lake District in England as part of a rehabilitation plan. Their journey is documented in the BBC film The Windermere Children. They were given just seven hours of English lessons and had to learn the rest for themselves.

Hersh lost 81 members of his immediate family in the Holocaust. Only one of his sisters survived.

== Post World War II ==
In 1948, Hersh volunteered to fight in the Israeli Defence Forces "to contribute towards the war of independence".

== Personal life ==
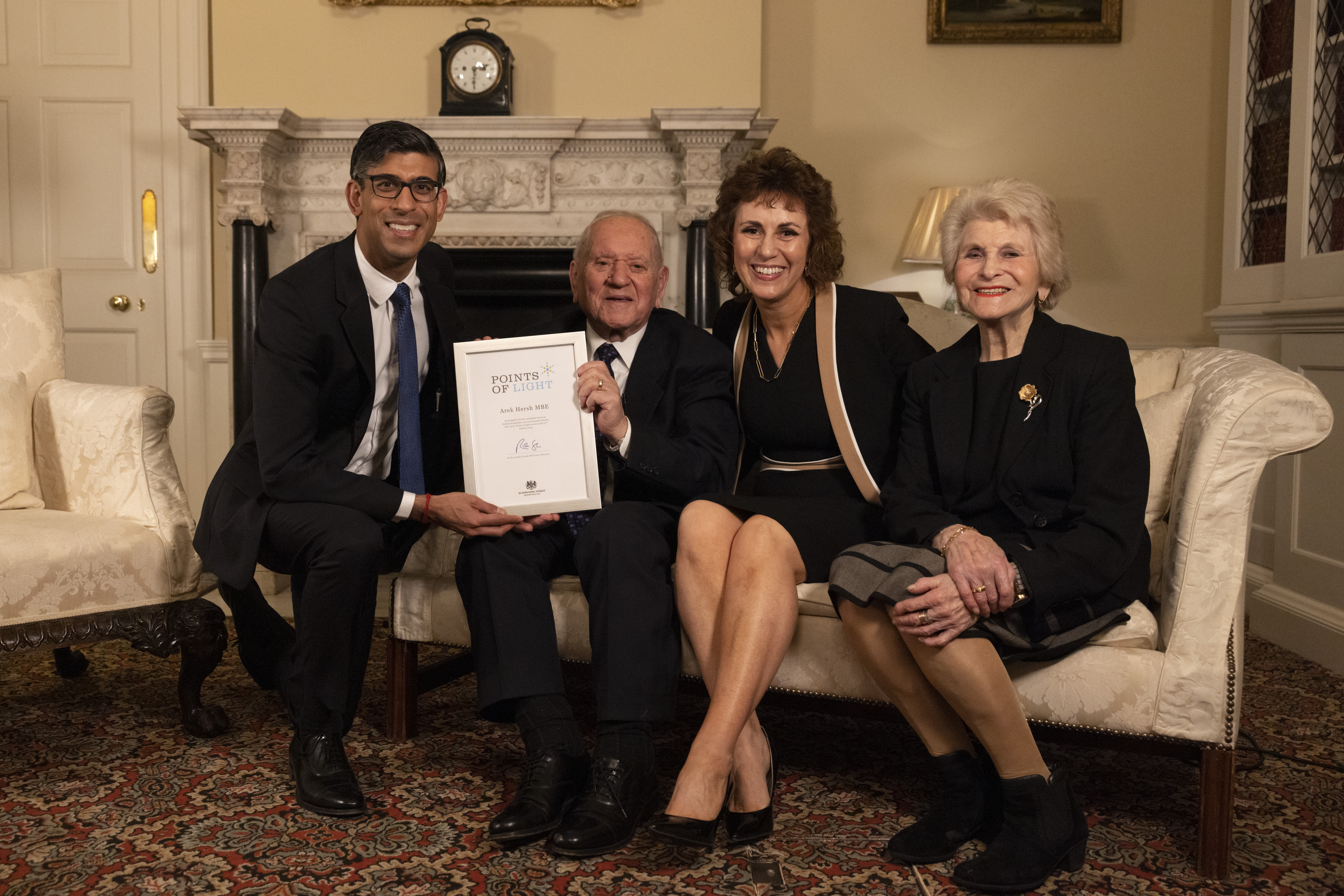
Rishi Sunak gives a Points of Light Award to Hersh in January 2023. With Hersh (aged 94) in 10 Downing Street are his wife Jean Hersh and their daughter Michelle Tanam.

Hersh lives near Leeds in England. He met his wife Jean at a dance in Leeds at the age of 32. They have three children and several grandchildren. In 1995, as part of his first public discussion of his Holocaust experiences, Hersh published his book, A Detail of History. All the proceeds go to the National Holocaust Centre and Museum (previously known as Beth Shalom) in Nottinghamshire, where he often gives presentations about his experience.

== Media ==
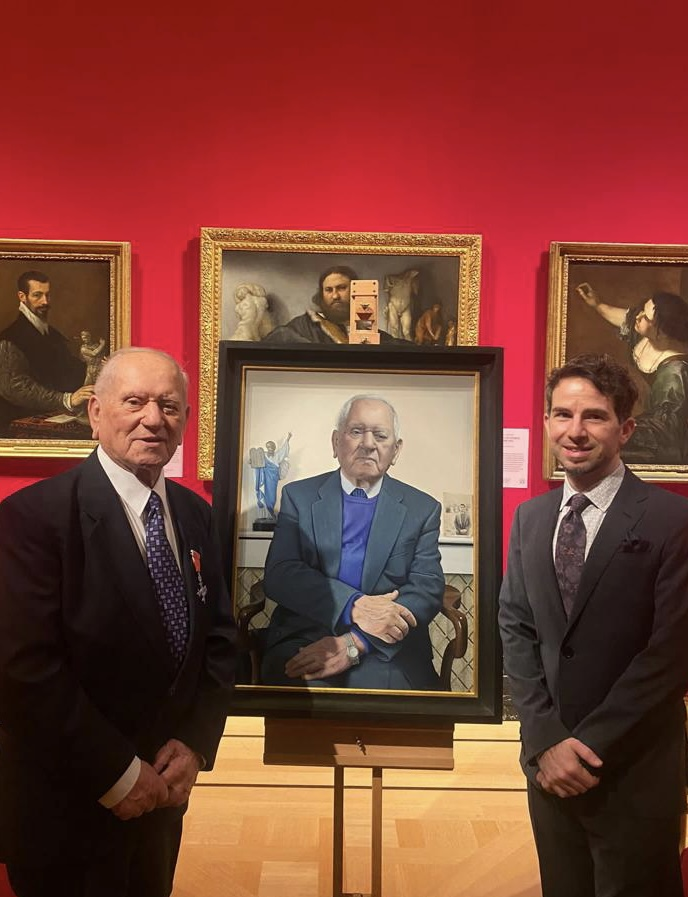
Hersh and artist Massimiliano Pironti at the Queen's Gallery

Hersh was the subject of the award-winning documentary Arek (2005) produced by Unison and directed by Tony Lloyd.

In 2019 Hersh was one of the subjects in the BBC drama The Windermere Children telling the story of the child survivors of the Nazi Holocaust on arrival at the Calgarth Estate by Windermere in 1945. He was interviewed for Route to Paradise, a 2020 British short documentary film which follows a team of archaeologists as they attempt to uncover the former Calgarth Estate.

In 2017 he was immortalised in a sculpture by Frances Segelman for the Leeds Makor Jewish Culture Office.

In 2021 Massimiliano Pironti was commissioned by Charles, Prince of Wales to paint a portrait of Hersh as part of the project-exhibition Seven Portraits: Surviving the Holocaust; the portrait is part of the Royal Collection.

== Awards ==
In the 2009 New Year Honours, he was awarded an MBE for voluntary service to Holocaust education.

In January 2023 the Prime Minister, Rishi Sunak, gave a Points of Light Award to Hersh in 10 Downing Street. Hersh showed Sunak the identification number tattooed on his arm.

== See also ==
- Miklos Kanitz
