= Route to Paradise =

2020 Documentary film by Thomas Gardner

- Directed by: Thomas Gardner
- Written by: Thomas Gardner
- Produced by: Trevor Avery; Thomas Gardner
- Cinematography: Thomas Gardner; Dylan Kirby-Smith
- Music by: Con Daniels
- Production companies: LDHP; Another Space
- Release date: 17 May 2020
- Running time: 33 minutes
- Country: United Kingdom
- Languages: English; German

Route to Paradise is a 2020 British short documentary film written, produced and directed by Thomas Gardner. The film follows a team of archaeologists from Staffordshire University as they attempt to uncover the former Calgarth Estate near Windermere, the site where 300 Jewish children were relocated to after being liberated from Nazi Germany's concentration camps during the Holocaust.

== Development ==
During Christmas 2018, artist and curator Trevor Avery approached filmmaker Thomas Gardner to make a film about the excavation and surveying of the former Calgarth Estate. An appeal was later released into the press for stories and photographs pertaining to the survivors from local residents who had been around during their time in the Lake District. The planned dig had been given the go ahead after being funded by the Heritage Lottery Fund.

== Production ==
Principal photography began early February 2019 in Oświęcim, Poland at Auschwitz concentration camp. Production was then moved back to the UK, where the crew spent two weeks filming on the grounds at The Lakes School with the archaeologists when the excavation began on 15 July 2019, then travelled to Nottingham to interview Norman Shepherd, a flight engineer with RAF Squadron 196. He was on the flight that brought the Windermere Children to England and is the last surviving member of the crew for that flight. The film was shot over a period of 5 months, featuring interviews with Arek Hersh and Sam Gontarz, two of the 300 children who had been liberated from concentration camps and re-settled in England. The main bulk of the footage came from survivor testimonies intertwined with footage from the excavation/survey of the Calgarth Estate, headed by forensic archaeologist Caroline Sturdy Colls who is most famous for her forensic examination of the Treblinka extermination camp.

It was released on YouTube in 2020.

== See also ==
The Windermere Children
