= St. Moritz Bobsleigh Club =

Club in St. Moritz, Switzerland for bobsleigh and skeleton enthusiasts

The St. Moritz Bobsleigh Club, officially known as Bobclub St. Moritz is a club located in St. Moritz, Switzerland for members interested in bobsleigh and skeleton. Founded in 1897, it is the oldest of its type in the world. The club is also responsible for maintaining the bobsleigh and skeleton track that has been used for two Winter Olympics, 21 bobsleigh and skeleton world championships, and one luge world championship.

The former president of the club is Gunter Sachs, a German industrialist, a position he has held from 1969 to his death in 2011.
