= Jack Petchey =

English businessman (1925–2024)

Sir Jack Petchey CBE
- Born: 19 July 1925; Plaistow, Essex, England
- Died: 27 June 2024 (aged 98); Wapping, London, England
- Occupations: Businessman and philanthropist
- Spouses: Diane Harrison; Frances Segelman (m. 2016)
- Children: One son, three daughters

Sir Jack Petchey CBE (19 July 1925 – 27 June 2024) was an English businessman and philanthropist.

== Early life ==
He was born on 19 July 1925 in Plaistow, Essex. He came from a working-class family and was brought up in the East End of London, leaving school aged 13.

During the Second World War, he served in the Royal Navy.

== Career ==
Petchey started a car hire and car sales business. From his profits he invested in property and timeshare which grew into a business empire valued over half a billion pounds by 2007. He became known as the grandfather of timeshare, and amassed his fortune with marketing in UK and abroad. It was the resort in Albufeira, Portugal, where the real timeshare boom took place, right up to late 2000s, when the whole conglomerate of leisure businesses was sold. In 1969, he was involved with property development, becoming one of the most successful businessmen in Britain.

Petchey's involvement in football first came when he was appointed a director of West Ham United in 1978. He then went on to own Watford Football Club which he bought from Elton John in 1987. He resigned as chairman in March 1994 and sold the club back to the singer.

== Philanthropy ==
The Jack Petchey Foundation runs an Achievement Award scheme – a reward and recognition initiative which enables schools and youth organisations to celebrate the achievements of their young people as well as receive additional funding.

The foundation has funding available for educational visits and for young volunteers to carry out projects both in the UK and abroad. The foundation was also the central funding body of the Petchey Academy and the Petchey Centre for Entrepreneurship. The Foundation has a branch in Albufeira, Portugal, which does similar work to its British counterpart.

Petchey was nominated as a Scouting In London Ambassador for the Scout Association Region for Greater London at an Adult Appreciation ceremony in 2008.

As of May 2017, he was worth an estimated £550 million.

== Personal life ==
Petchey was married twice. He first married Diane Harrison in 1949; they had four children. In 2016 at the age of 90 he married a second time to Frances Segelman, a sculptor. He died at his home in Wapping, London, on 27 June 2024, at the age of 98.

== Honours ==
Petchey was appointed Officer of the Order of the British Empire (OBE) in the 2004 Birthday Honours for services to Young People in East London and Essex through the Jack Petchey Foundation, and Commander of the Order of the British Empire (CBE) in the 2011 Birthday Honours for charitable services. He was knighted in the 2016 New Year Honours for services to young people in East London and Essex through the Jack Petchey Foundation.

On 27 May 2010, he was given the Freedom of the Borough of Newham.

He was also made an Honorary Commodore in the Sea Cadet Corps.
