= Holocaust teaching hoax =

2007 chain email message

The Holocaust teaching hoax was a hoax perpetrated in Great Britain in 2007 that purported that the teaching of the Holocaust had been banned in British schools for fear of offending Muslim pupils. These sensationalist claims, mainly circulated in a chain email, were false, but were inspired by a reported event at a school in Northern England in which a teacher avoided teaching the Holocaust as an optional topic.

The emails alleged that the ban had been put in place because of concerns that such teaching could "offend" Muslim pupils, claiming that "the Muslim population" denied the Holocaust. On 2 April 2007, the Daily Mail and The Guardian ran stories on the subject. The emails led some to contact the BBC to verify the claims, as teaching the Holocaust is mandatory in English state schools—except in academies—and has not been banned elsewhere in the United Kingdom.

In 2008, as email messages continued to circulate, the British government Schools Secretary Ed Balls wrote to the UK's embassies and the world media in order to refute the allegation that schools had banned or were reluctant to teach about the Holocaust.

== Email ==
The most popular version of the email reads as follows:

In Memoriam

Recently, this week, UK removed The Holocaust from its school curriculum because it "offended" the Muslim population which claims it never occurred. This is a frightening portent of the fear that is gripping the world and how easily each country is giving into it.

It is now more than 60 years after the Second World War in Europe ended. This e-mail is being sent as a memorial chain, in memory of the six million Jews, 20 million Russians, 10 million Christians and 1,900 Catholic priests who were murdered, massacred, raped, burned, starved and humiliated with the German and Russia [sic] peoples looking the other way!

Now, more than ever, with Iran, among others, claiming the Holocaust to be "a myth," it is imperative to make sure the world never forgets.

This e-mail is intended to reach 40 million people worldwide!

Join us and be a link in the memorial chain and help us distribute it around the world. Please send this e-mail to 10 people you know and ask them to continue the memorial chain.

Please don't just delete it. It will only take you a minute to pass this along - Thanks!

== Origin ==
The emails were based upon a wide-ranging report which the Department for Education and Skills commissioned from the Historical Association, a group which promotes the study of history. This report suggested that teachers may avoid emotive and controversial periods of history, but did not recommend that they do. The report went on to give an example of a school in "a northern city" in which a history teacher had recently avoided selecting the Holocaust as an optional topic for GCSE coursework for fear of confronting antisemitic sentiment and Holocaust denial among some Muslim pupils. It was also noted that, in another school, the Holocaust had been taught in spite of "anti-Semitic sentiment among some pupils" but that study of the Crusades had been avoided because of the contrast to the stories with which Muslim pupils were raised.

In no case was it suggested that avoiding causing offence to Holocaust deniers should be an aim.

== See also ==
- Holocaust Educational Trust
- Holocaust denial
