= Karen Pollock =

Chief executive of the Holocaust Educational Trust

Karen Emma Pollock CBE (born May 1974) is a British activist and is the chief executive of the Holocaust Educational Trust (HET).

== Early life ==
Pollock, who is Jewish, read French and Italian at the University of Leeds. She was politically active while at university, engaging with the National Union of Students and the Union of Jewish Students.

== Career ==
Pollock was director of the All-Party Parliamentary Group against Antisemitism.

She later joined the Holocaust Educational Trust (HET) in 1998 as Director of Communications. Pollock was promoted to chief executive of the organisation in 2000. One campaign led by Pollock was asking the government to recognise British people who had saved Jewish lives during the Holocaust. Pollock was praised by politicians across the spectrum for 'Lessons from Auschwitz', a programme that has enabled thousands of sixth form and university students to visit Auschwitz concentration camp.

Alongside HET, she is involved with the anti-fascist organisation Searchlight and the London Jewish Forum, as well as the Holocaust Memorial Day Trust of which she was a founding trustee.

She represented The Board of Deputies of British Jews at the United Nations World Conference against Racism in 2001 and 2009.

She is a vice-president of the Jewish Leadership Council.

She was appointed Member of the Order of the British Empire (MBE) in the 2012 New Year Honours for services to education, specifically about the Holocaust, and Commander of the Order of the British Empire (CBE) in the 2020 Birthday Honours for services to Holocaust education.

== Political views ==
In an opinion piece in The Guardian, entitled "Of course the Holocaust is relevant to Israel now", Pollock compared the Holocaust and the October 7 attacks, writing that "Jews will inevitably connect the trauma of an attack that murdered more than a thousand innocent civilians with the trauma of Nazi massacres." She also wrote that "The world turned its back" on Jews, "after Hitler came to power", and, now, regarding 7 October, "there are many who once again looked on, many who justified it and a distressing number who even celebrated it."
