= Maryam Diener-Sachs =

Iranian-born Swiss author (born 1961)

- Born: Maryam Banihashem; September 25, 1961; Tehran, Iran
- Citizenship: Switzerland
- Education: Paris Sorbonne, Columbia University
- Occupation: Writer
- Spouses: Rolf Sachs (m. 1985; div. 2014) Roger Diener (m. 2015)

Maryam Diener-Sachs (née Banihashem; formerly Sachs; born 25 September 1961) is an Iranian-born Swiss author, publisher and emeritus trustee of the Royal Academy of Arts.

Her debut novel Sans te dire adieu (Without saying goodbye), initially published in French, has been translated into both German and English. Further novels include The Passenger (London 2013) and Beyond Black There Is No Colour, The Story of Forough Farrokhzad (London 2020).

In 2012, Maryam Diener founded, together with writer and publisher Wilfried Dickhoff, Éditions Moon Rainbow, a Berlin-based publishing house focusing on limited edition books presenting encounters between poetry and visual arts, e.g. Francesco Clemente & Bei Dao, Rosemarie Trockel & Henri Michaux, Marcel Broodthaers, Jean Fautrier & Francis Ponge and Etel Adnan & Eugénie Paultre.

== Personal life ==
In 1985, Maryam Banihashem married Rolf Sachs (born 1955), whom she separated and divorced in 2015. They had three children together:

- Philipp Sachs (born 1986)
- Frederik Sachs (born 1988)
- Roya Sachs (born 1991)

In 2014, she married Roger Diener, a Swiss architect and principal of Diener & Diener, an architecture firm in Basel, Switzerland.

== Bibliography ==
=== Anthologies ===
- Der Kuss (The Kiss), (1991)
- Der Mond (The Moon), (1998)

=== Photography ===
- The Wild Emperor (2005, with Rolf Sachs)
- Paradise Lost: Persia From Above

=== Stand-alone novels ===
- Sans te dire adieu (Without saying goodbye)
- The Passenger (London 2013)
- Beyond Black There Is No Colour, The Story of Forough Farrokhzad (London 2020)
