= The Windermere Children =

2020 British biographical tv film

- DVD cover
- Genre: Biographical film
- Written by: Simon Block
- Directed by: Michael Samuels
- Starring: Iain Glen; Romola Garai; Thomas Kretschmann; Tim McInnerny
- Theme music composer: Alex Baranowski
- Countries of origin: United Kingdom; Germany
- Original language: English

Production
- Producer: Alison Sterling
- Cinematography: Wojciech Szepel
- Editor: Victoria Boydell
- Running time: 88 mins.
- Production companies: Wall to Wall Media; Warner Bros. ITVP Germany

Original release
- Network: BBC Two
- Release: 26 January 2020

The Windermere Children is a 2020 British biographical drama television film written by Simon Block and directed by Michael Samuels Based on the experience of child survivors of the Holocaust, it follows the children and staff of a camp set up on the Calgarth Estate in Troutbeck Bridge, near Lake Windermere, England, where the survivors were helped to rehabilitate, rebuild their lives, and integrate into the British society. The film was Executive Produced by Eleanor Greene and Leanne Klein. Simon Block and Michael Samuels also served as executive producers, with Nancy Bornat as factual producer and Ben Evans as development producer. The film first aired on BBC Two in January 2020.

== Cast ==
- Iain Glen as Jock Lawrence
- Romola Garai as Marie Paneth
- Thomas Kretschmann as Oscar Friedmann
- Tim McInnerny as Leonard Montefiore
- Philipp Christopher as Georg Lauer
- Kuba Sprenger as Ike Alterman
- Anna Schumacher as Edith Lauer
- Marek Wroblewski as Shmuel
- Pascal Fischer as Ben Helfgott
- Jakub Jankiewicz as Salek Falinower
- Kacper Swietek as Chaim Olmer
- Tomasz Studzinski as Arek Hersh
- Lukasz Zieba as Juliusz

== Production ==
The real Calgarth Estate was demolished in the 1960s. The Lakes School near Windermere now stands on the former site of the wartime housing scheme that housed the children in 1945.

Although set in the Lake District, the production was filmed in locations around Northern Ireland.

== Reception ==
As of October 2021, the film holds a 100% approval rating on Rotten Tomatoes, based on 11 reviews with an average rating of 8.5/10.

== Awards ==
In October 2020, The Windermere Children won the Best European TV Movie of the Year prize at Prix Europa. A jury member commented "This story gives hope, told with a twinkle in the eye, making the children's stories, their traumas and their losses manageable for the viewer."

== See also ==
- Route to Paradise
