= Zigi Shipper =

Polish holocaust survivor (1930–2023)

Zigi Shipper BEM
- Born: Zygmunt Shipper; 18 January 1930; Łódź, Poland
- Died: 18 January 2023 (aged 93)
- Known for: Holocaust survivor
- Spouse: Jeanette (m. 1955; died 2020)
- Children: 2

Zigi Shipper BEM (born Zygmunt Shipper; 18 January 1930 – 18 January 2023) was a Polish survivor of the Holocaust and public speaker. Born and raised in Łódź, Poland, he survived the Łódź Ghetto, the Auschwitz-Birkenau extermination camp, the Stutthof concentration camp, and a death march to Neustadt in Holstein, and was eventually liberated by the British Army on 3 May 1945.

In 1947, he moved to England and became a public speaker and educator with the Holocaust Educational Trust (HET), often speaking in schools about his experiences. In 2016, he was awarded a British Empire Medal for 20 years of work educating people about the Holocaust.

== Biography ==
=== Early life ===
Zygmunt Shipper was born on 18 January 1930 in Łódź, Poland into a Jewish family. When he was five years old, his parents divorced. As they were an Orthodox family, divorce was disapproved of, so he was told that his mother had died. Shipper had a happy childhood and was raised by his father and grandparents. In Łódź, he attended a Jewish school.

=== Persecution by the Nazis ===
In 1939, at the beginning of World War II, his father became aware of the increasing persecution of the Jews by the Nazis and fled to Russia. He believed that the danger only applied to Jewish men, not children or the elderly. Shipper continued living with his grandparents until the Germans arrived in the town. He never saw his father again. Even though his father returned to Poland sometime later during the war, Shipper was unable to trace what happened to him, but presumed that he had died in the Warsaw Ghetto or Treblinka extermination camp.

=== Łódź Ghetto ===
Between November 1939 and April 1940, the entire Jewish population of Łódź was transferred to Łódź Ghetto. Due to the increased scarcity of food, Shipper's grandfather quickly died from malnutrition in 1942. Death in the ghetto was commonplace. Shipper recalled stepping over dead bodies at the age of ten. Like other Jews in the ghetto, he was forced to work. He worked in a metal factory producing munitions.

Due to the increasing number of Jews being sent to the ghetto, the Nazis selected thousands to be sent to concentration camps. In 1942, the German guards told the people running the ghetto that they required 70,000 Jews to go to work in Germany. Shipper's grandmother said she would go into hiding and asked her grandson to join her, but at the age of 12 he did not believe they would take him, so he refused. The next day, he was selected for transfer and put in a lorry next to children, disabled people and elderly people, but escaped by jumping from the lorry and hiding in the house. He knew that if the Germans had seen him, he would have been shot. He said that nobody knew what happened to the people in the lorry.

He continued to live in the squalid ghetto until 1944, when the ghetto was liquidated and the Nazis transferred the inhabitants on overcrowded cattle trucks to Auschwitz-Birkenau. Many of the occupants died of dehydration on the journey. He recalled the conditions in the cattle trucks: "They opened those shutters and they started to take people in. When they finished, they couldn't close it, it was so many people. If anybody sat down, other people were standing on them or sitting on them, and they were dying." After several days of travelling in the cattle trucks, Shipper noted that there was more room to sit down. He explained, "Every morning they used to open those shutters and take out dead bodies of people that died, children, grown ups, from starvation, from disease and from suffocation."

=== Auschwitz-Birkenau ===
Shipper arrived at the Auschwitz-Birkenau death camp aged 14. He remembered seeing the name "Auschwitz" through the slits in the cattle truck, but did not know what it meant. He arrived alongside his grandmother, aunts, uncles and cousins. All of the people who worked in the metal factory were put to one side, while the others were lined up for selection. The German guards were directing the arrivals to the left and right. He said, "All the people who went to the left were old people, disabled people, children and also women holding babies...They tried to rip the babies out of their arms." He was selected as one of the young men who was fit to work and was forced to shower, shave, give up his possessions and wear striped clothing printed with a number. He said, "My number was 84,303 and I can't forget it for the life of me. I tried so many times to forget it, but I can't." The people who were not fit enough to work, (the women, children, elderly and disabled) were gassed to death within the hour.

=== Stutthof concentration camp ===
After Auschwitz, he was sent to Stutthof concentration camp located near Danzig (Gdańsk). There he was made to work alongside other young men in the railway yards. He witnessed five men being hanged in front of the entire camp for stealing cigarettes. In March 1945, he contracted typhus from being sent on a forced death march to the German naval town of Neustadt in Holstein and only survived due to the help of his friends. He said, "I was very ill at the time and either you walked or you died, you had two choices." He was liberated by the British Army on 3 May 1945 and spent three months recuperating in hospital due to overeating after prolonged malnutrition. He and his friends then stayed in a displaced persons' camp.

=== Move to England ===
Shipper learned that Britain and Sweden were taking in a thousand children into their countries. He was offered a transfer to Sweden or England, but declined due to not having any family there. He was then given a letter sent by a woman in England who had found his name on a Red Cross list in London and said that she had a son with the same name. She said that her son had burned his left wrist when he was very young. Shipper had a scar in the same place and realised that the woman was his mother, whom he had believed to be dead. She asked him to move there and live with him. He was initially reluctant to go because his mother was a stranger, but his friends, who were also survivors, encouraged him. He said that leaving them was one of the saddest moments of his life.

He moved to England in 1947. When he arrived, he was met by his stepfather who asked him where his luggage was. He replied, "What I'm wearing is what I have." Initially, he found settling in difficult because he missed his fellow survivors, but found new friends at the Primrose Club, a Jewish youth club for Holocaust survivors in Belsize Park in London. He said, "I felt as though I had found my family again." At the club he also met his wife Jeanette, a French Jewish woman. He later learned that his grandmother, from whom he had been separated after Auschwitz, had died on the day of liberation at Theresienstadt.

=== Public speaker and educator ===
Shipper began to speak in schools about his experiences of the Holocaust. He said, "I really get so much out of speaking to schools, I want young people to know, especially young people, what happened because of racism and most importantly, hatred." He shared his story through the Holocaust Educational Trust (HET) outreach programme and also spoke at various community events.

He made his first return visit to Auschwitz in the 1990s, accompanied by his two daughters.

In 2012, he spoke to the England squad alongside Ben Helfgott MBE about his experiences of the Nazi concentration camps before Euro 2012. Being an avid football fan, he described the event as one of the greatest honours of his life. England captain Steven Gerrard described his story as, "very moving and very inspirational for us."

In January 2015, at the age of 85, Shipper made a return visit to Auschwitz, accompanied by ITN News.

On 18 July 2017, he and his friend Manfred Goldberg visited Stutthof concentration camp alongside the Prince and Princess of Wales, where he spoke to them about his experiences there. Goldberg and Shipper had become lifelong friends when Goldberg supported him during the death march from Stutthof.

In 2021, Catherine, Princess of Wales met with Shipper and Goldberg to mark Holocaust Memorial Day.

King Charles III commissioned a portrait of Shipper and six other survivors in 2022 for an exhibition titled Seven Portraits: Surviving the Holocaust; the portrait is part of the Royal Collection., which was displayed in Buckingham Palace in 2022.

=== Personal life ===
Shipper married Jeanette and their marriage lasted 65 years until her death in 2020. The couple had two daughters and six grandchildren.

In 1981, he had a heart attack and the doctors did not think that he would survive. His wife responded that she was not particularly concerned, as the Nazis had tried to kill him for five years.

=== Death, honours and legacy ===
Shipper died on 18 January 2023, his 93rd birthday. His death was announced during Prime Minister's Questions on the same day. The Prince and Princess of Wales, Prime Minister Rishi Sunak and Lord Ian Austin were amongst those who paid tribute to him. Chief Rabbi Ephraim Mirvis commented that Shipper had "devoted his life" to educating others about the Holocaust and was a "beacon of light".

In the 2016 New Year Honours Shipper was awarded a British Empire Medal for his work educating people about the Holocaust over the course of 20 years.

On Holocaust Memorial Day 2026, holocaust survivors and their families were at Buckingham Palace with Charles III. The King was re-showing the Seven Portraits: Surviving the Holocaust that he had commissioned of holocaust survivors.
