= Willy Sachs =

German soldier and industrialist (1896-1958)

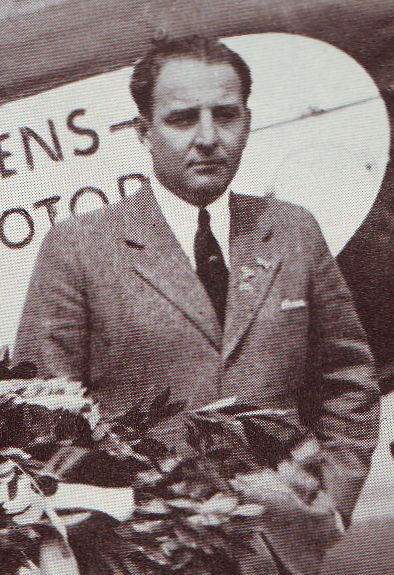
- at Tempelhof, 1933
- Born: Wilhelm Josef Sachs; 23 July 1896; Schweinfurt, German Empire
- Died: 19 November 1958 (aged 62); Oberaudorf, West Germany
- Occupation: Industrialist
- Organization(s): Fichtel & Sachs

Wilhelm Josef Sachs known as Willy Sachs (23 July 1896 – 19 November 1958) was a German industrialist and Nazi party member. He served in the SS as an Obersturmbannführer and was appointed as a Wehrwirtschaftsführer, recognizing his company's importance to the war effort. Sachs was awarded the Federal Cross of Merit in 1957 and was an honorary citizen of Schweinfurt, Mainberg and Oberaudorf.

== Biography ==
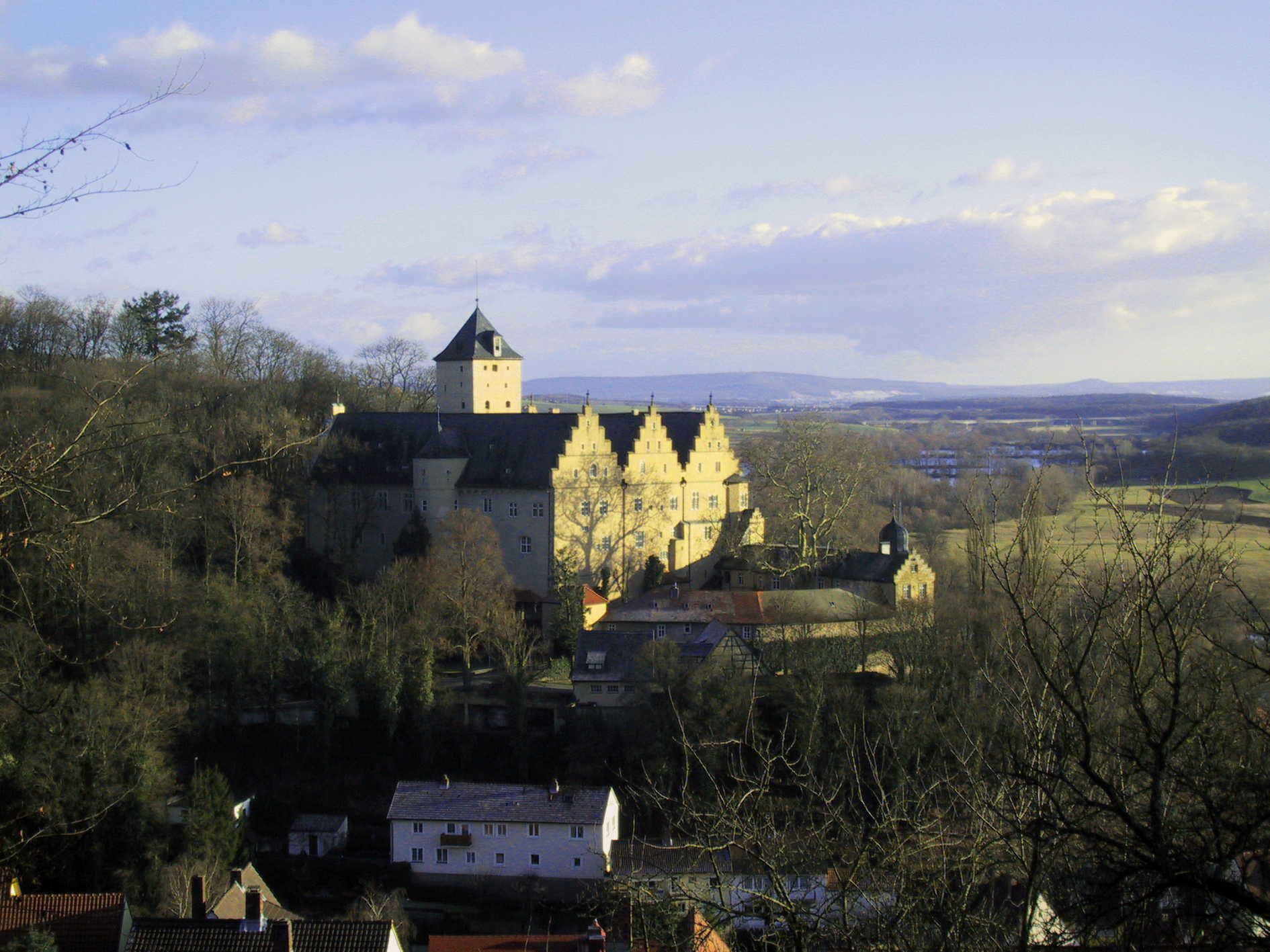
Schloss Mainberg (2005)

Willy Sachs was born in Schweinfurt, the only son of the industrialist Ernst Sachs. After internships with several international companies Sachs joined his father's company in 1923 as a board member, and upon the senior Sachs' death in 1932, became the sole owner of Fichtel & Sachs AG in Schweinfurt. Sachs was seen as a caring patriarch, often given to spontaneous generosity. He saw it as his mission in life to share his father's work with the next generation. However, he inherited little of his father's talent at management. Although he held the title of general director, the company of 7,000 workers was, by 1939, actually run by its directors Heinz Kaiser, Rudolf Baier and Michael Schlegelmilch. Sachs turned to hunting, women, and alcohol as diversions. His lavish parties at Mainberg Castle and on the Rechenau became legendary. It was said, "wherever there was a party, the consul [Sachs] was there." (Sachs had inherited the title of Royal Swedish Consul from his father upon whom it had been bestowed for his work with SKF.)

In 1933, Sachs became a member of the SS and the Nazi Party. As the head of an important arms manufacturer, he was named Wehrwirtschaftsführer ["War Industry Leader"]. Heinrich Himmler awarded him medals and honorary titles (including Obersturmbannführer in 1943) and helped with Sachs' divorce from Elinor von Opel and the ensuing custody battle for their children. Himmler and Hermann Göring were guests of Sachs' hunting outings in Mainberg.

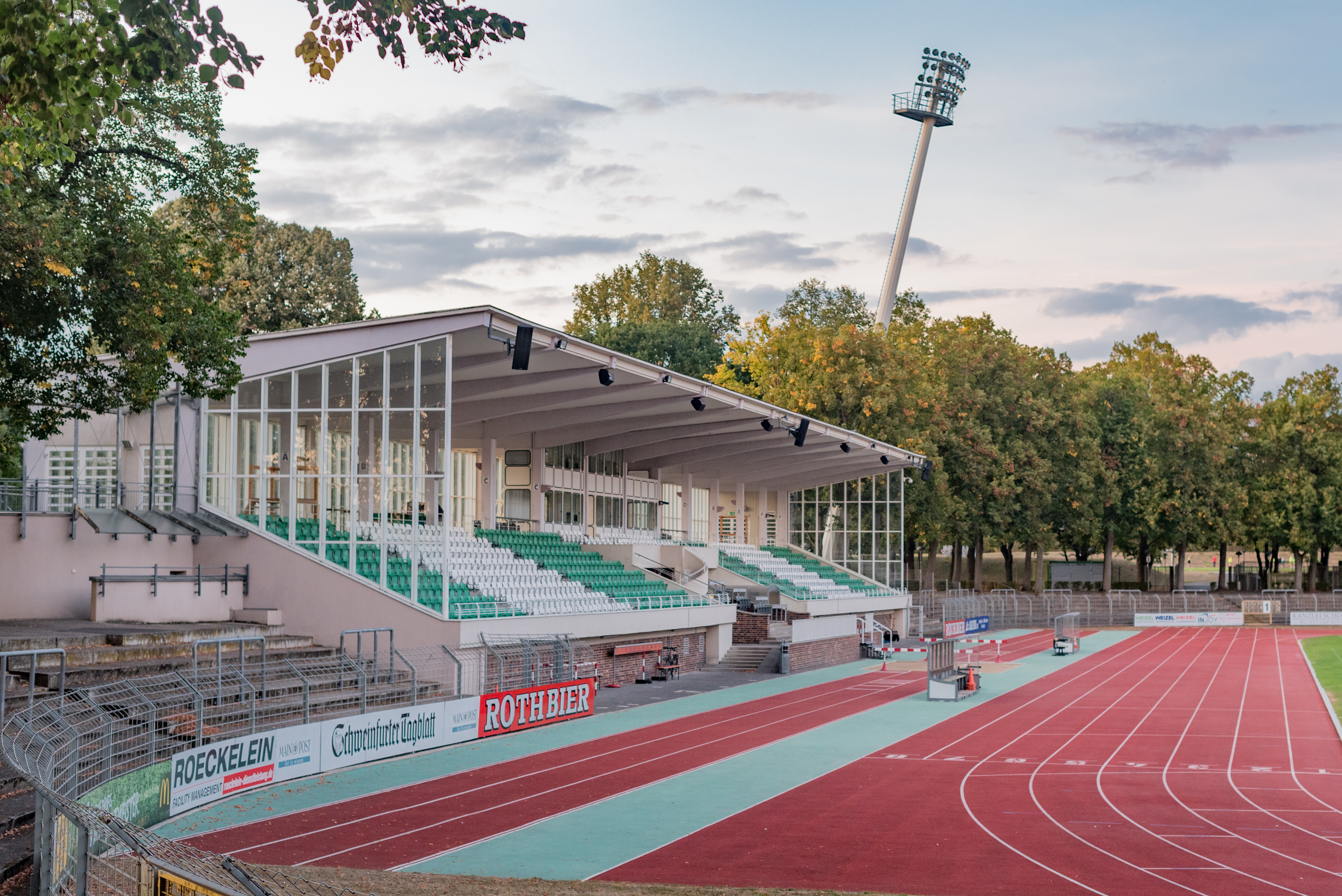
Sachs-Stadion, known as Willy-Sachs-Stadion until 2021.

In 1936, as patron of 1. FC Schweinfurt 05, Sachs donated the stadium that bore his name, the Willy-Sachs-Stadion in Schweinfurt. This gift to the city secured his lasting popularity beyond death. As part of the Schweinfurt Lest we forget initiative, the local press (including Süddeutsche Zeitung, Gerhard Fischer and Werner Skrentny) initiated a campaign to rename the stadium due to Sachs' Nazi affiliation. The campaign met with low approval among the general public. In 2021, a majority of the city council of Schweinefurt voted to rename the stadium "Sachs-Stadion" in light of his involvement with Nazism; the city also stripped Sachs of his honorary citizenship.

In spring 1945, the region became part of the American occupation zone in Germany. US soldiers arrested Sachs in May 1945 in Oberaudorf and held him until February 1947.

During the denazification process following World War II, he was twice labeled a "Mitläufer" ("Follower", Category IV). Author Wilfried Rott labeled this process a "whitewashing".

After his release, at the age of 51, Sachs officially retired from active management and was relegated as chairman of the supervisory board to ceremonial duties. In recognition of his philanthropy (including restoration of the Ernst Sachs Assistance organization as the Occupation Pensions Authority), Sachs was awarded the Order of Merit in 1957.

Sachs spent his last years mostly on the family estate (Sachs Rechenau) at Oberaudorf. On 19 November 1958, he committed suicide at the age of 62, driven by depression and fear of blackmail. He was laid to rest to the great sympathy of the populace.

== Family ==
Sachs was married to Elinor von Opel (1908–2001), daughter of Wilhelm von Opel, from 1925 to 1935. They had two sons: Ernst Wilhelm (1929–1977) and Gunter (1932–2011). From 1937 to 1947, he was married to Ursula Meyer, of Prey, Vosges. Following his 1947 divorce, Sachs lived with Catherine Hirnböck, with whom he had one child: Peter Sachs (born 1950). Sachs officially adopted Peter in 1957.
