= Ben Helfgott =

Holocaust survivor and weightlifter (1929–2023)

Sir Ben Helfgott MBE
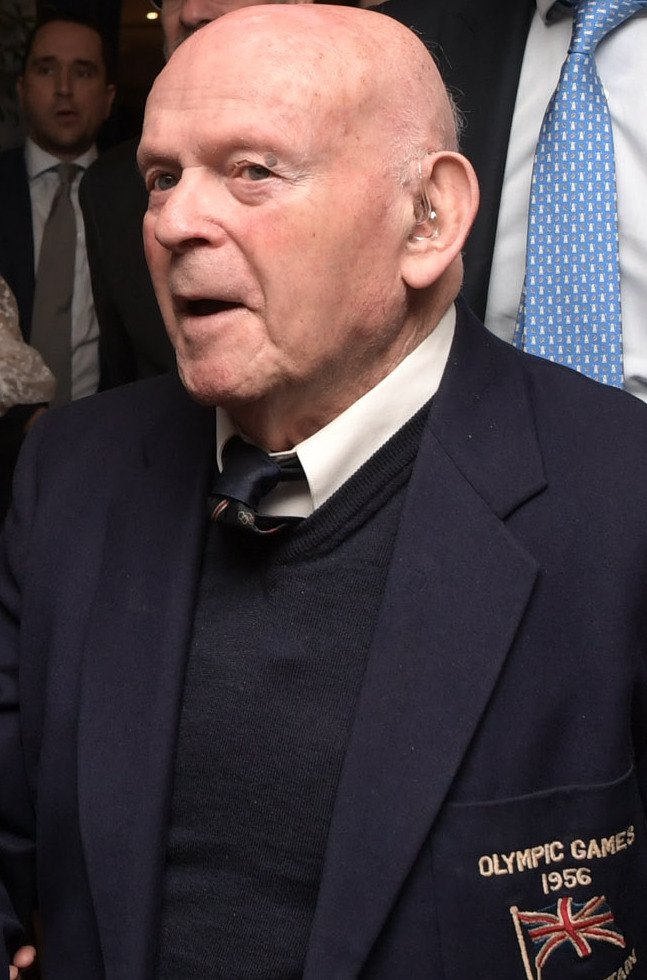
- Helfgott in 2021

Personal information
- Nationality: British/Polish
- Born: 22 November 1929 Piotrków Trybunalski, Łódz Voivodeship, Poland
- Died: 16 June 2023 (aged 93) London, England
- Height: 165 cm (5 ft 5 in)
- Weight: 67 kg (148 lb)

Sport
- Country: Great Britain
- Sport: Weightlifting
Medal record
Representing Great Britain
Weightlifting
Maccabiah Games
Gold medal – first place	1950 Israel	Lightweight
Gold medal – first place	1953 Israel	Lightweight
Gold medal – first place	1957 Israel	Lightweight
Representing England
Commonwealth Games
Bronze medal – third place	1958 Cardiff	Lightweight

Sir Benjamin Helfgott MBE (22 November 1929 – 16 June 2023) was a Polish-born British Holocaust survivor, Olympian and champion weightlifter. He was one of two Jewish athletes known to have competed in the Olympics after surviving the Holocaust, along with Alfred Nakache, a French champion swimmer and water polo player. Helfgott and his sister Mala Tribich spent their adult lives promoting Holocaust education, meeting with national leaders in the UK to promote cultural integration and peace.

== Biography ==
Helfgott was born in Piotrków Trybunalski, Łódź Voivodeship, Poland. His family were part of a population of 55,000. His mother, Sara, looked after the house and her father, Moishe, was the town's miller.

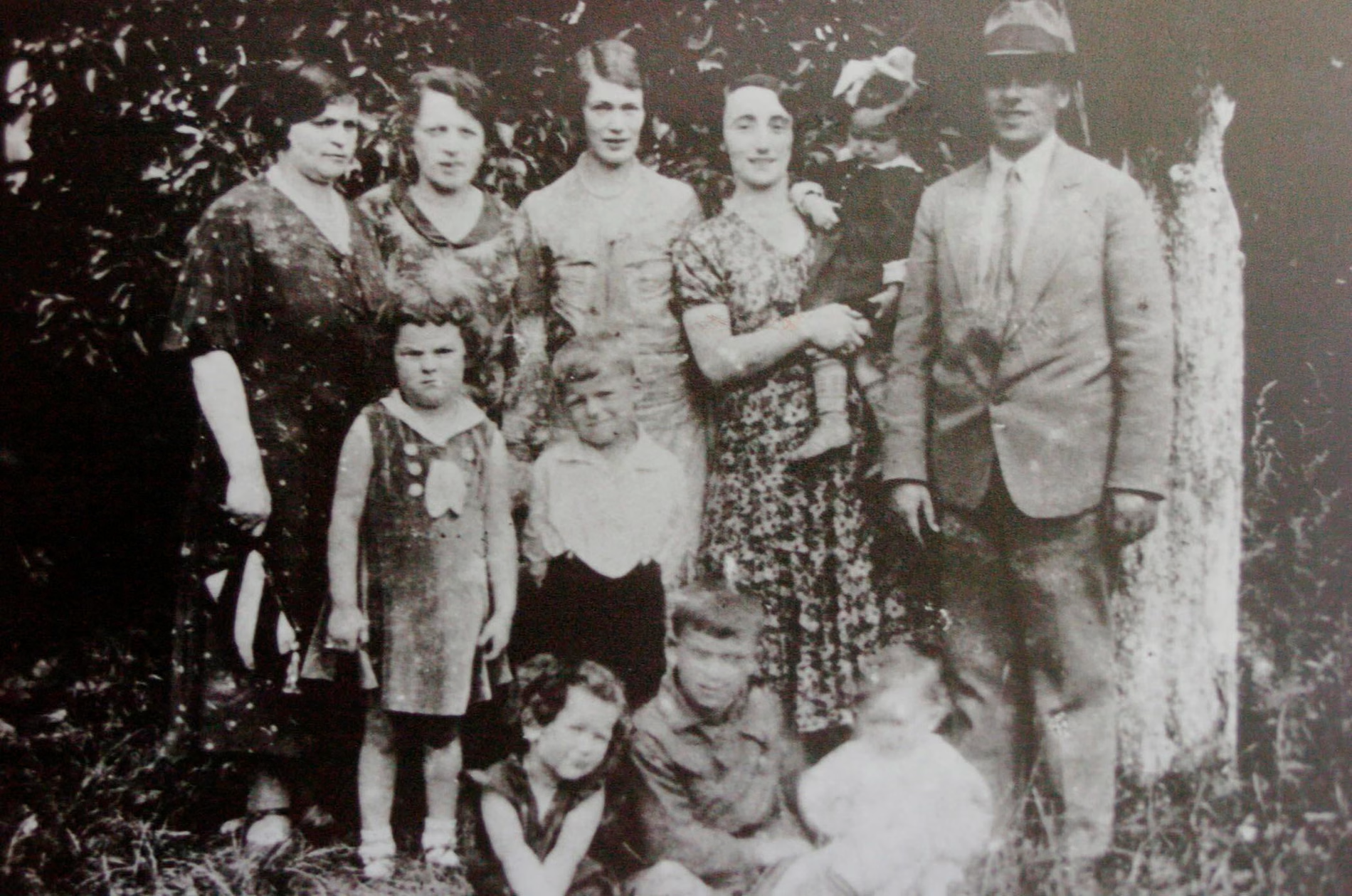
Mala's family in 1934 (Ben is centre left and his sister Mala is in front)

He was with his siblings at their grandparents in Sieradz on 1 September 1939 when the German army invaded Poland. They were re-united with their parents at Sulejów where incendiary bombs were dropped. The town burned and the population of 5,000 unwisely sheltered in a nearby wood, that also burned. The family returned to their home town where his two uncles were among the many Jewish men who were shot. His father avoided this as he was able to confuse the guards.

In 1942, he initially convinced the Nazis that he was ethnically Polish, and not a Jew. He was eventually sent to a concentration camp. Initially sent to Buchenwald, Helfgott survived the Holocaust. He was liberated in 1945, but was very weak. He was among 732 orphan refugees under the age of 16 brought to England after the war by the Central British Fund for German Jewry (CBF), now World Jewish Relief, after being liberated from Theresienstadt; he formed a part of the initial 300 arrivals and thus of the group known as The Windermere Children who were sent to Troutbeck Bridge on arrival. He and one of his sisters (Mala Tribich, born Piotrków 24 September 1930, now living in London) were the only members of his family to survive the war; his mother and youngest sister were rounded up and shot by the Nazis.

There are descriptions of his experiences both during and after the Holocaust in Martin Gilbert's book The Boys, The Story of 732 Young Concentration Camp Survivors about 732 young concentration camp survivors who were sent to the United Kingdom after the war.

== Weightlifting career ==
Helfgott won Great Britain's 11 st (70 kg) championship in 1954, and was lightweight champion in 1955, 1956, and 1958. He represented Great Britain in weightlifting in the 1956 Summer Olympics at Melbourne, Australia.

Helfgott was the captain of the British weightlifting teams at the 1956 Olympics in Melbourne and the 1960 Olympics in Rome. In addition, he was a bronze medal winner at the 1958 British Empire and Commonwealth Games held in Cardiff, South Wales. Helfgott also won the gold medal in the lightweight class at the 1950, 1953 and 1957 Maccabiah Games.

== Media appearances ==
As a guest on the BBC Radio 4 Desert Island Discs programme on 1 April 2007, he chose to be stranded with a copy of Bertrand Russell's A History of Western Philosophy and a bar with two discs for weight training.

In 2010, Helfgott was one of five British Jews interviewed for an exhibit at the London Jewish Museum exploring "different ways of being Jewish."

In 2018, Helfgott appeared in an edition of the BBC series Who Do You Think You Are? featuring Robert Rinder. In the programme, Helfgott recalled how he had encountered Rinder's maternal grandfather, Moszek (Moses, Morris), in the Schlieben concentration camp.

== Personal life and death ==
Helfgott married Arza in 1966, with whom he then had three sons and nine grandchildren. He had begun a course at the University of Southampton in 1948 but dropped out after a year and thereafter was partner in a business manufacturing dresses.

Helfgott died on 16 June 2023, at the age of 93.

== Awards, honours and recognition ==
=== Poland ===
Commander's Cross of the Order of Merit of the Republic of Poland (2005)
Knight's Cross of the Order of Merit of the Republic of Poland (1994)

=== United Kingdom ===
Knight Bachelor (2018)
Member of the Order of the British Empire (2000)

Helfgott was appointed a Member of the Order of the British Empire (MBE) in the 2000 Birthday Honours, for services to community relations.

In 2012, at a Limmud convention in Nazareth Illit organized to commemorate the 40th anniversary of the Munich massacre, Helfgott was awarded a prize by the mayor.

In the 2018 Birthday Honours, Helfgott was appointed a Knight Bachelor in recognition of his contribution to services to Holocaust remembrance and education.

In October 2020, Helfgott was awarded the Pride of Britain award by Stephen Fry; the 2020 event was held at the Holocaust Memorial in Hyde Park because of the coronavirus pandemic.

== See also ==
- List of Jews in sports
