= Seven Portraits: Surviving the Holocaust =

UK 2022 exhibition of portraits of Holocaust survivors

Seven Portraits: Surviving the Holocaust was a 2022 exhibition commissioned by His Royal Highness The Prince of Wales to honour seven Holocaust survivors who settled in the United Kingdom and contributed significantly to Holocaust education and remembrance. The portraits were created by seven contemporary artists and entered the Royal Collection and overseen by the Royal Collection Trust. The exhibition first opened at The Queen's Gallery, Buckingham Palace and later at the Palace of Holyroodhouse.

The project served as a living memorial to the six million Jews murdered in the Holocaust and highlighted the resilience of the survivors whose testimonies continue to educate future generations.

== The survivors, their artists, and their portraits ==
Survivor	Artist	Background	Portrait	RCIN
Helen Aronson	Paul Benney	Helen Aronson survived the Łódź Ghetto and later dedicated her life to Holocaust education in the UK.	Benney's work reflects Aronson's resilience and her commitment to sharing her testimony.	408755
Lily Ebert	Ishbel Myerscough	Lily Ebert survived Auschwitz–Birkenau and became one of the UK's most prominent Holocaust educators.	Myerscough's painting captures Ebert's strength and dedication to remembrance.	408753
Manfred Goldberg	Clara Drummond	Manfred Goldberg survived several camps, including Stutthof, and became a leading voice in Holocaust education.	Drummond's portrait emphasises Goldberg's calm presence and commitment to recounting his experiences.	408758
Arek Hersh	Massimiliano Pironti	Arek Hersh survived Auschwitz and other camps, later becoming an educator and author.	Pironti's depiction highlights Hersh's personal history and the emotional weight of his testimony.	408756
Anita Lasker-Wallfisch	Peter Kuhfeld	A survivor of Auschwitz and Bergen-Belsen, Anita Lasker-Wallfisch became a celebrated cellist and co‑founder of the English Chamber Orchestra.	Kuhfeld's portrait reflects her dignity and lifelong dedication to remembrance and music.	408754
Rachel Levy	Stuart Pearson Wright	Rachel Levy survived Auschwitz and a death march, later becoming a speaker and educator.	Pearson Wright's work captures Levy's quiet strength and determination to share her story.	408759
Zigi Shipper	Jenny Saville	Zigi Shipper survived the Łódź Ghetto and Stutthof concentration camp, becoming a well‑known figure in UK Holocaust education.	Saville's portrait emphasises Shipper's warmth and dedication to speaking with students.	-

== Background ==
The Prince of Wales, Patron of the National Holocaust Memorial Day Trust, commissioned the portraits as a tribute to seven individuals who survived the Holocaust and later dedicated their lives to sharing their experiences. Each survivor was paired with a leading British artist, resulting in seven unique works that reflect both personal history and artistic interpretation.

The portraits were intended to stand as permanent reminders within the Royal Collection, ensuring that the survivors’ stories remain accessible to the public.

== Exhibition history ==
=== The Queen’s Gallery, Buckingham Palace ===
Seven Portraits: Surviving the Holocaust was opened by The Prince of Wales on January 24, 2022, at The Queen's Gallery, Buckingham Palace, to a private audience of seven Holocaust survivors, their families, plus the artists. Later that week the exhibit opened to the general public, allowing a wider audience to view the works.

=== Palace of Holyroodhouse (17 March – 15 May 2022) ===
The exhibition moved to the Palace of Holyroodhouse in Edinburgh, where the seven portraits were displayed alongside biographical information about each Holocaust survivor.

=== Present day status ===
The seven portraits have not been seen in public since the second exhibit at the Palace of Holyroodhouse. They now form part of the Royal Collection.

== Exhibition publication ==
A fully illustrated catalogue, Seven Portraits: Surviving the Holocaust, was published to accompany the exhibition.

In the publication foreword, HRH the Prince of Wales reflects on the Holocaust as one of the darkest chapters in human history, noting that its horrors remain within living memory. He emphasises the extraordinary resilience of the seven survivors portrayed in the exhibition, describing them as individuals who rebuilt their lives in Britain and dedicated themselves to educating others. The Prince expresses his hope that the portraits will stand as lasting reminders of both the atrocities committed and the courage of those who endured them, ensuring that future generations continue to learn from their stories.

Simon Sebag Montefiore’s introduction situates the portraits within the broader historical context of the Holocaust, underscoring the scale of the genocide and the personal tragedies endured by European Jews. He highlights the significance of portraiture as a means of restoring individuality to victims and survivors, countering the dehumanisation imposed by the Nazi regime. Montefiore describes each sitter as a witness whose life story embodies survival, dignity, and moral clarity, and he frames the project as both an artistic achievement and a vital act of remembrance.

The volume was produced by Modern Art Press in association with the Royal Collection Trust and includes 54 pages of essays, biographical material, and high‑quality reproductions of all seven commissioned portraits.

== Reception and legacy ==
The exhibition was widely praised for its emotional impact and educational value. The portraits were later featured in the BBC documentary Survivors: Portraits of the Holocaust, which explored the creation process and the stories of the sitters.

== Permanently at Buckingham Palace ==
On Holocaust Memorial Day 2026, holocaust survivors and their families were invited to Buckingham Palace by King Charles III. The King was showing the portraits he had commissioned. Portraits of seven survivors who have been honoured for services to Holocaust awareness and education now hang permanently in the East Wing of Buckingham Palace.
