= Frances Segelman =

English sculptor (born 1949)

- Born: 1949 (age 76–77); Leeds, West Riding of Yorkshire, England
- Education: Leeds
- Known for: Sculpture
- Notable work: Bronze statues and busts
- Movement: Bronze Sculpture
- Spouse: Sir Jack Petchey (m. 2016; died 2024)
- Website: www.segelman.com

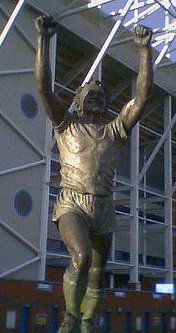
Billy Bremner statue in celebratory stance outside Leeds United's ground Elland Road

Frances Segelman, Lady Petchey (born 1949) is an English sculptor.

Born in Leeds, Segelman is an Associate of the Royal Society of British Sculptors and is known for her busts of royalty and celebrity personalities. Amongst others she has sculpted busts of Queen Elizabeth II, the Duke of Edinburgh, Joan Collins, Joanna Lumley, Bruce Forsyth, Eamonn Holmes, David Frost, Sven-Göran Eriksson, Jack Rosenthal, Cherie Blair, and John Profumo. In 1999, her statue of Leeds United legend Billy Bremner was unveiled at Elland Road.

She also created a series of sculptures of survivors of the holocaust which included Freddie Knoller, Rachel Levy, Sir Ben Helfgott, Leslie Kleinman BEM, Ivor Perl BEM and Miriam Freeman.

== Marriage ==
In February 2016, she married 90 year old philanthropist and businessman, Sir Jack Petchey. On 27 June 2024 Petchey died aged 98.
