= Holocaust Educational Trust =

British Holocaust education charity

- Formation: 1988
- Founder: Greville Janner
- Type: Non-profit organisation
- Leader: Karen Pollock

The Holocaust Educational Trust (HET) is a British charity, based in London, whose aim is to "educate young people of every background about The Holocaust and the important lessons to be learned for today."

One of the Trust's main achievements is ensuring that the Holocaust formed part of the National Curriculum for history.

== History and personnel ==
It was founded by the Labour MP Greville Janner and the former Labour Home Secretary Merlyn Rees in 1988, and is a registered charity in England & Wales and in Scotland. Its current chief executive is Karen Pollock, who was awarded an MBE for her services to Holocaust education in 2012. Its chairman is Paul Phillips and its president is Stephen Rubin. Its honorary patrons include Lord Carey, Lord Dholakia, Lord Mackay of Clashfern and Elie Wiesel.

The charity changed its logo in 2008. It celebrated its 30th anniversary in 2018.

== Work ==
HET logo prior to 2008

Under its Outreach Programme, the HET arranges visits to schools by Holocaust survivors, often accompanied by one of its own educators. The trust helps several hundred teachers a year to teach more effectively about the Holocaust, including both PGCE students and practising teachers. The trust organises an annual intensive ten-day course in Israel for teachers, in partnership with the International School for Holocaust Studies at Yad Vashem.

=== Lessons from Auschwitz Project ===
The Trust arranges visits to Auschwitz-Birkenau, by UK region, for two sixth-form students from participating schools and colleges. Around 150 students take part in one project at any time. A Guardian reporter who accompanied such a visit in 1999 wrote:

Trust members knew from experience, both personal and from the teachers' trip to Auschwitz earlier this year, that this visit would be tough... Seeing one horrendous exhibit after another was relentless and exhausting – many of us ended up numb, stunned, freezing cold. Then we felt awful – how dare we find it too much after a few hours?

In 2006, more than 400 students made such visits. This project is supported by a £1.5 million grant from the Treasury, enabling two students from every secondary school and further education college in Britain to visit Auschwitz each year. The project involves four stages:

- An Outreach seminar, where participants hear a first-hand testimony of a Holocaust survivor
- A one-day trip to the former concentration and death camp, Auschwitz
- A Follow-Up seminar, where participants reflect on their experience at the camp and begin to plan the final stage of the project
- The Next Steps Project, whereby the two participants create their own project to share with their school or local community to pass on the lessons they have learned from visiting Auschwitz.

On 18 October 2012, the Holocaust Educational Trust marked its 100th Lessons from Auschwitz project trip. Deputy Prime Minister Nick Clegg was among those in attendance.

On 2 May 2013, the Scottish government announced that it will provide £510,000 of additional funding for the Lessons from Auschwitz project over the next two years.

=== HET Ambassador Programme ===
HET Ambassador Conference 2013 Logo

On 8 July 2013, a groundbreaking seminar for over 500 young people was held in the Queen Elizabeth II Conference Centre in London to mark the launch of the new Ambassador Programme. The Trust's Chief Executive, Karen Pollock, describes HET Ambassadors as "young people that have shown a commitment to enabling as many people as possible to benefit from what they have learnt."

The 500 young Ambassadors – who have all participated in the Trust's Lessons from Auschwitz Project – bore witness to speakers including world-renowned historians, Professors Yehuda Bauer and David Cesarani, BBC Political Editor, Nick Robinson and Director of Liberty, Shami Chakrabarti CBE.

As part of the Ambassador Programme, a cohort of 25 Regional Ambassadors (coinciding with the charity's 25th anniversary) were appointed to help strengthen the now 20,000 strong Ambassador community by providing an Ambassador representative for each region in addition to the Trust's Ambassador Outreach Officer. This has secured a visible presence of HET Ambassadors all across the United Kingdom, covering the regions of England (South West, South East, London and Thames Valley Chilterns, Eastern, Yorkshire and Humber and North West, East Midlands, North East, West Midlands), Scotland and Wales.

On the eve of 8 July 2013, after the Ambassador Conference, Regional Ambassadors attended a reception in Speaker's House in the Palace of Westminster, along with MPs, Peers and Supporters of the Trust, to celebrate the launch of the Ambassador Programme. Attendees heard from the Rt. Hon John Bercow MP and Lord Browne of Madingley, the former Chief Executive of BP and head of the Ambassador Programme. Lord Browne also chaired a steering group with Regional Ambassadors on 9 July 2013 along with Doreen Lawrence OBE, Prof. Yehuda Bauer and Holocaust survivor, Kitty Hart-Moxon, discussing "why and how we remember the Holocaust and how we can communicate its relevance in contemporary British society."

Between 18 and 26 July 2013, for the first time, a select team of young people belonging to the HET Ambassador community attended a seminar in Holocaust Studies at the International School for Holocaust Studies at Yad Vashem in Jerusalem.

=== British Hero of the Holocaust award ===
From 2008, the Trust campaigned to have British people such as Frank Foley, who had assisted in the rescue of Holocaust victims, posthumously recognised with official British Honours. The Government created the British Hero of the Holocaust medal, awarding it in March 2010 to 25 people posthumously, including Foley as well as Sir Nicholas Winton and Denis Avey.

== See also ==
- Holocaust Memorial Day (UK)
- Holocaust teaching controversy of 2007
