= List of student newspapers in the United Kingdom =

This is a list of notable student newspapers in the United Kingdom.

== National ==
- Affairs Today (2013–2017)
- The Gateway (2014–2018/19)
- The National Student (2003–2019)
- The Student Journals (2010–2014)
- Student Times
- The Tab

== England ==
- University of Bath – Bathimpact
- University of Bristol — Epigram
- University of Cambridge — The Cambridge Student (TCS), Varsity, Cantab (1981–1990)
- Durham University — Palatinate, Durham21 (2000–2011)
- University of East Anglia — Concrete
- University of Exeter — Exeposé
- Falmouth University & University of Exeter, Cornwall campuses — The Falmouth Anchor
- Imperial College London — Felix
- King's College London — Roar News
- Keele University — Concourse
- Lancaster University — SCAN
- University of Leeds — The Gryphon
- University of Leicester — Leicester Student Magazine
- University of London — London Student (1979–2014)
- London School of Economics — The Beaver
- University of Manchester — The Mancunion
- Newcastle University — The Courier
- University of Nottingham — Impact
- University of Oxford — The Oxford Student, Cherwell, The Isis, The Oxymoron (satirical)
- University of Reading — The Spark
- University of Sheffield — Forge Media
- University of Southampton — Wessex Scene
- University of Surrey — The Stag
- University of Sussex — The Badger
- University College London - UCL Pi Media
- University of Warwick — The Boar
- University of York — Nouse, York Vision

== Northern Ireland ==
- Queen's University Belfast — The Gown

== Scotland ==
- University of Aberdeen — The Gaudie
- University of Edinburgh — The Student
- University of Glasgow — The Glasgow Guardian
- University of Strathclyde — Strathclyde Telegraph
- Edinburgh-wide — The Journal (2007–2015)
- Scotland-wide — Scotcampus

== Wales ==
- Cardiff University — gair rhydd

== See also ==
- Student newspaper
- List of student newspapers
- List of student newspapers in Australia
- List of student newspapers in Canada
- List of student newspapers in the United States of America
