= Sajid Javid =

British politician (born 1969)

The Right Honourable Sir Sajid Javid
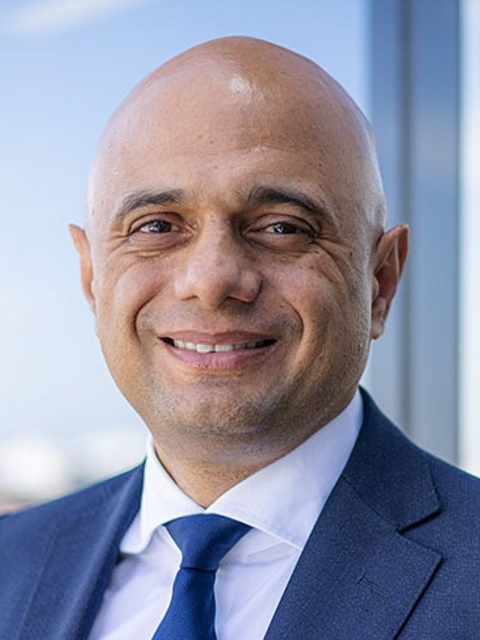
- Official portrait, 2022

Chancellor of the Exchequer
- In office 24 July 2019 – 13 February 2020
- Prime Minister: Boris Johnson
- Preceded by: Philip Hammond
- Succeeded by: Rishi Sunak

Secretary of State for Health and Social Care
- In office 26 June 2021 – 5 July 2022
- Prime Minister: Boris Johnson
- Preceded by: Matt Hancock
- Succeeded by: Steve Barclay

Home Secretary
- In office 30 April 2018 – 24 July 2019
- Prime Minister: Theresa May
- Preceded by: Amber Rudd
- Succeeded by: Priti Patel

Secretary of State for Housing, Communities and Local Government (Note: Secretary of State for Communities and Local Government from July 2016 until January 2018)
- In office 13 July 2016 – 30 April 2018
- Prime Minister: Theresa May
- Preceded by: Greg Clark
- Succeeded by: James Brokenshire

Secretary of State for Business, Innovation and Skills; President of the Board of Trade
- In office 12 May 2015 – 13 July 2016
- Prime Minister: David Cameron
- Preceded by: Vince Cable
- Succeeded by: Greg Clark

Secretary of State for Culture, Media and Sport
- In office 9 April 2014 – 11 May 2015
- Prime Minister: David Cameron
- Preceded by: Maria Miller
- Succeeded by: John Whittingdale

Minister for Equalities
- In office 9 April 2014 – 15 July 2014
- Prime Minister: David Cameron
- Preceded by: Maria Miller
- Succeeded by: Nicky Morgan
Junior ministerial offices
Financial Secretary to the Treasury City Minister
In office 7 October 2013 – 9 April 2014
Prime Minister	David Cameron
Preceded by	Greg Clark
Succeeded by	Nicky Morgan (as Financial Secretary); Andrea Leadsom (as City Minister)
Economic Secretary to the Treasury
In office 4 September 2012 – 7 October 2013
Prime Minister	David Cameron
Preceded by	Chloe Smith
Succeeded by	Nicky Morgan

Member of Parliament; for Bromsgrove
- In office 6 May 2010 – 30 May 2024
- Preceded by: Julie Kirkbride
- Succeeded by: Bradley Thomas

Personal details
- Born: 5 December 1969 (age 56) Rochdale, Lancashire, England
- Party: Conservative
- Spouse: Laura King (m. 1997)
- Children: 4
- Education: University of Exeter (BA)
- Website: www.sajidjavid.com

Sir Sajid Javid (Note: /ˈsædʒɪd ˈdʒævɪd/) (born 5 December 1969) is a British former politician who served as Secretary of State for Health and Social Care from June 2021 to July 2022, having previously served as Home Secretary from 2018 to 2019 and Chancellor of the Exchequer from 2019 to 2020. A member of the Conservative Party, he was Member of Parliament for Bromsgrove between 2010 and 2024.

Born in Rochdale into a Pakistani family, Javid was brought up largely in Bristol. He studied Economics and Politics at the University of Exeter, where he joined the Conservative Party. Working in banking, he rose to become a managing director at Deutsche Bank. He was elected to the House of Commons in May 2010. Under the coalition government of David Cameron he was a Junior Treasury Minister before being promoted to Cameron's Cabinet as Culture Secretary, following Maria Miller's resignation. Following the 2015 general election, Cameron promoted Javid to Business Secretary.

Javid was a prominent supporter of the unsuccessful Britain Stronger in Europe campaign for the UK to remain in the European Union. Following the 2016 referendum vote to leave the European Union, he went on to serve under Cameron's successor Prime Minister Theresa May, as Communities Secretary from 2016 to 2018. When Amber Rudd resigned as a result of the Windrush scandal in 2018, Javid was appointed as her successor as Home Secretary, becoming the first British Asian and first Muslim to hold one of the Great Offices of State. Following May's resignation, Javid stood for election as Leader of the Conservative Party in the 2019 leadership contest, finishing in fourth place. The successful candidate, Boris Johnson, appointed him Chancellor of the Exchequer in his first Cabinet. Javid resigned as Chancellor during the February 2020 cabinet reshuffle after refusing a demand from Johnson and his chief adviser Dominic Cummings that he dismiss his advisers, and was succeeded by Rishi Sunak.

In June 2021, following the resignation of Matt Hancock, he was reappointed to Johnson's cabinet as Health Secretary. This made him a prominent figure in the UK government response to the COVID-19 pandemic, in which he supported an end to most generalised public health restrictions, such as face mask mandates until the emergence of the highly transmissible Delta cron hybrid variant from June 2021 until the end of March 2022, and he also expanded the COVID-19 vaccination programme in the United Kingdom. Following the Chris Pincher scandal, Javid resigned as Health Secretary on 5 July 2022, and was the first of 62 Conservative MPs to resign their government positions during the government crisis, which culminated in Johnson's own resignation. He returned to the backbenches and was succeeded by Steve Barclay. Javid stood to replace Johnson in the July–September 2022 Conservative Party leadership election but withdrew from the race before he could be nominated, subsequently endorsing Liz Truss. He later endorsed Sunak in the October 2022 Conservative Party leadership election, and stood down as an MP at the 2024 general election. He was appointed Knight Bachelor in the 2024 New Year Honours for political and public service. Javid has been the chair of the Holocaust Memorial Day Trust since July 2025.

== Early life ==
Sajid Javid was born on 5 December 1969 in Rochdale, one of five sons of Pakistani parents, who had immigrated to the United Kingdom in the 1960s. His family were Punjabi Muslim farmers belonging to the Arain caste, from the Rajana village in Toba Tek Singh District, within the Sandal Bar region of central Punjab.

His father worked as a bus driver. His mother did not speak English until she had been in the UK for ten years. His family moved from Lancashire to Stapleton Road, Bristol, as his parents took over a shop there, and the family lived in a two-bedroom flat above it. Javid is able to hold a conversation in broken Punjabi. Despite having an Islamic upbringing, Javid no longer practises any religion. However, he still describes himself as being a Muslim, claiming to be "the first Muslim Home Secretary to be invited" to an iftar party in the House of Commons.

As a teenager, Javid developed an interest in financial markets, following the Thatcher government's privatisations. He says that, at the age of fourteen, he borrowed £500 from a bank to invest in shares and became a regular reader of the Financial Times.

From 1981 to 1986, Javid attended Downend School, a state comprehensive near Bristol. At school it was recommended that he should be a television repairman. Javid has said he was told that he could not study maths at O-Level, so he had to get his father to pay for it. When he later witnessed a video showing an assault on a Syrian refugee, he remarked that it was reminiscent of bullying he had experienced at school; Javid said he faced racial abuse when younger, being called a "Paki", and having faced abuse from "National Front skinheads". Speaking in 2014, Javid said that while at school: "I was naughty, more interested in watching Grange Hill than homework". After being told by his school that he could only study two A-Levels when he believed he needed three to go to university, Javid subsequently attended Filton Technical College from 1986 to 1988, and finally the University of Exeter from 1988 to 1991, graduating with a Bachelor of Arts (BA) degree in economics and politics.

Javid was a trustee of the London Early Years Foundation, a governor of Normand Croft Community School, and has led an expedition to the summit of Mount Kilimanjaro in Tanzania, the highest mountain in Africa, to show his support of Help the Aged.

=== Early political activism ===
At university, he joined the Conservative Party. In 1990, aged 20, Javid attended the annual Conservative Party Conference for the first time and campaigned against the Thatcher government's decision that year to join the European Exchange Rate Mechanism (ERM). He was handing out leaflets against the policy when he first met TV presenter Jeremy Paxman. He has since said that Paxman first interviewed him at that same conference.

From 1992 until 1996, he lived in New York City and rose to become the youngest vice-president of Chase Manhattan Bank and during this period, he had a spell as an aide to Republican nominee Rudy Giuliani's successful 1993 New York mayoral campaign.

In 1998, Javid was selected as prospective parliamentary candidate for Brent North. However, he later withdrew.

He worked as an adviser to Conservative MP Gary Streeter, the then Shadow Secretary of State for International Development.

== Banking career ==
Javid had an 18-year City career, during which he rose to become a board member of Deutsche Bank International. Javid joined Chase Manhattan Bank in New York City immediately after graduation, working mostly in Latin America and overselling Mexican government bonds prior to the Mexican peso crisis. Aged 25, (Note: This is the commonly reported age but the Conservative Party website says it was at the age of 24, amongst other sources.) he became a vice president. A 2012 article says he was vice-chairman, although his own website, among others, affirms the more probable claim that he was a vice president, a more junior role at the bank. He returned to London in 1997, and later joined Deutsche Bank as a director in 2000. In 2004, he became a managing director at Deutsche Bank and, the following year, global head of Emerging Markets Structuring. He was also an Adviser to Lufthansa in Germany.

In 2007, he relocated to Singapore as head of Deutsche Bank's credit trading, equity convertibles, commodities and private equity businesses in Asia, and was appointed a board member of Deutsche Bank International Limited.

He left Deutsche Bank in 2009 to pursue a career in politics. His earnings at Deutsche Bank would have been roughly £3 million a year at the time he left and the Evening Standard once estimated his career change would have required him to take a 98% pay cut.

Javid applied for and held non-domicile status for six years during his banking career which allowed him to avoid paying tax in the UK on his overseas earnings.

== Political career ==
=== Member of Parliament ===
On 28 May 2009, the sitting MP for Bromsgrove, Julie Kirkbride, announced that she would be standing down at the next general election in light of the expenses scandal; Kirkbride had represented the constituency since 1997. Her resignation was confirmed in December 2009, after she attempted to withdraw it.

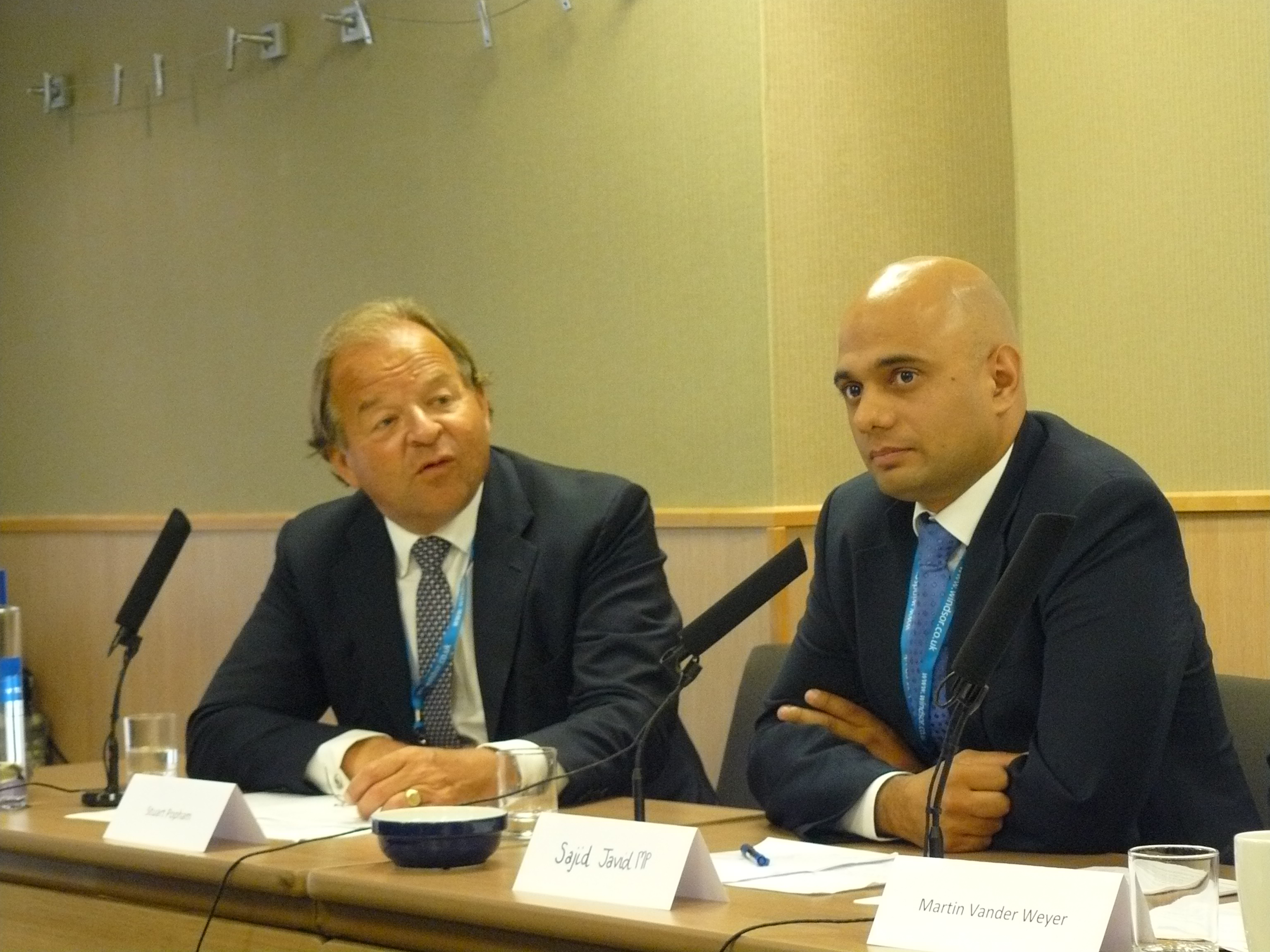
Stuart Popham (left) and Javid at the 2011 Conservative Party Conference in Manchester

After a selection contest held by the Bromsgrove Conservative Association on 6 February 2010, in which he received over 70% of the votes cast by its members, Javid was announced as the official Conservative Party parliamentary candidate for the 2010 general election. The other candidates up for selection included Ruth Davidson and Tina Stowell. On 6 May 2010, Javid received 22,558 votes, winning the seat by a majority of 11,308 votes. In terms of the number of votes cast in the constituency, this was an increase on the majority of 10,080 at the previous general election, though was a reduction when compared both to the actual number of votes his predecessor had received (24,387) and to the Conservatives' percentage share of the vote (43.7% versus 51.0% in 2005). The constituency's boundaries had reformed prior to the election.

In the 2019 general election, Javid received 34,408 votes and was returned as the MP for Bromsgrove, receiving 63.4% of the vote and increasing his already sizeable majority to 23,106 over Labour.

==== Political recognition ====
According to former Foreign Secretary Jack Straw, those MPs first elected in 2010 "are the best new MPs for over thirty years", and he identified Javid as one of six Conservative MPs that he believed had "already made an impact in the first term". Javid was also one of six new MPs profiled by the Financial Times, and was named as the Newcomer of 2010 by the ConservativeHome blog.

In October 2012, Iain Dale in The Daily Telegraph included Javid in his list of "Top 100 most influential figures from the Right". Dale wrote: "His fast rise up the greasy pole into George Osborne's inner circle is not only proof of this man's ambition but also his talent." Nicholas Watt in The Guardian also suggested that Javid could rise to the top.

In The Times' 2014 right-wing power list, Javid moved up 18 places to No. 8, with the article stating that he had emerged "as the senior member of the 2010 intake" and that if "the Tories want to jump a generation, then a Javid leadership candidacy would provide the opportunity." The 2014 GG2 Power List ranked Javid as the most influential British Asian, and, at the accompanying GG2 Leadership Awards event on 5 November 2014, then-Prime Minister David Cameron described Javid as "the brilliant Asian man who I asked to join the Cabinet" and said that "I want to hear that title 'Prime Minister' followed by a British Asian name." In July 2014, Forbes magazine compared Javid to Barack Obama and suggested that Javid could become the next Prime Minister of the United Kingdom.

In January 2015, Javid was awarded the Politician of the Year award at the British Muslim Awards. In November 2017, Sajid Javid won Patchwork Foundation's MP of the Year Award.

In June 2018, a polling of Tory activists on ConservativeHome showed Javid was popular as a potential party leader. The poll is seen as a reliable barometer of grassroots opinion, although it is known to shift quickly. A separate poll of Conservative Party members by YouGov in July 2018 also showed he had high levels of support to become party leader. YouGov found Javid reached the height of the charts on two measures; with 64% thinking he is "up to the job" and 69% calling him "competent".

==== Campaign against anti-Semitism ====
Javid's appointment as Home Secretary was welcomed by a number of Jewish organisations, including the Board of Deputies of British Jews and the Jewish Leadership Council.

Previously, as Secretary of State for Communities and Local Government, Javid wrote to all local council leaders to ask them to adopt the IHRA's definition of anti-Semitism. In 2015, addressing the Holocaust Educational Trust's annual dinner, the then Business Secretary Javid condemned "dinner party anti-Semites" and said, "I can't remember the last time I spoke to a Jewish friend or colleague who hasn't, at some point, found themselves sitting awkwardly at a dinner party while a fellow guest railed against the international 'kosher conspiracy'".

In 2018, Javid suggested Jeremy Corbyn should quit as Labour leader following his decision to attend a 2014 wreath-laying at a cemetery which contained the graves of many Palestinian activists; including Salah Khalaf and Atef Bseiso, members of the Black September Organization.

==== Criticism ====
In March 2018, Javid called Momentum "neo-fascist" in the House of Commons chamber. Momentum threatened legal action if he repeated the comment outside Parliament where parliamentary privilege does not protect him against a lawsuit. MPs including Jon Trickett, Chris Williamson, Alex Sobel, Clive Lewis and Caroline Lucas demanded Javid withdraw the statement and apologise.

In July 2018, Javid back-tracked after Jeremy Corbyn had threatened legal action for linking Corbyn with Holocaust denial. Labour MPs accused Javid of "peddling a lie" and called on Theresa May to intervene.

Javid rejected a request by the Muslim Council of Britain for an independent inquiry into allegations of Islamophobia within the Conservative Party. Javid said: "The Muslim Council of Britain (MCB) does not represent Muslims in this country" and added "we don't deal with the MCB". Harun Khan, the MCB's secretary-general said, "it sadly indicates that the party has no interest in dealing with this matter with the seriousness it deserves".

Javid was rebuked by MPs and human rights campaigners for tweeting about "Asian paedophiles", with the director of the Runnymede Trust commenting: "racialising this crime and focusing on the ethnicity of the sexual predators has done little to address why and how these victims were vulnerable to the prey of these sexual predators". The Independent suggested Javid had ulterior motives with an impending leadership battle and said, "If Javid imagines his racial and religious origins offer any defence to the charge of incendiary race-baiting, he must be out of his tiny mind." His comments were defended by Fraser Nelson, editor of The Spectator, who said: "The way to stop populists is for mainstream politicians to address difficult and important issues calmly and directly."

Baroness Warsi has criticised Javid for dog-whistling: "he should read what these people are saying, because however much he dog-whistles, however much he panders to the right of our party, sadly the right of our party still believe he's far too Muslim to be leader of the party".

In August 2019, John McDonnell questioned Javid's suitability for the office of Chancellor of the Exchequer, citing his background in sales of collateralized debt obligations (CDOs) and alleged links to tax avoidance schemes. Javid held several senior executive positions in investment banking, including a role with responsibility for sale of CDOs, and during his time Deutsche Bank had operated a tax avoidance scheme known as "dark blue" that channelled bankers' bonus payments through the Cayman Islands.

=== Conservative leadership elections ===
==== Joint leadership bid, 2016 ====
In June 2016, following David Cameron's resignation after the result of the EU referendum, Secretary of State for Work and Pensions Stephen Crabb announced that he would be standing in the 2016 Conservative leadership election, on a "joint ticket" with Javid. If Crabb became Prime Minister, Javid would become Chancellor of the Exchequer. Crabb withdrew from the contest after the first round of voting amongst Conservative Members of Parliament. Shortly after withdrawing his bid, Crabb resigned from the Cabinet following allegations that he had sent suggestive messages to a young woman.

In an interview with the Financial Times, Javid said he had expected to be sacked when Theresa May became prime minister in July 2016, instead he was moved across in a re-shuffle to Secretary of State for Communities and Local Government, and Crabb subsequently took a post as parliamentary chairman of Conservative Friends of Israel.

==== Conservative leadership bid, 2019 ====
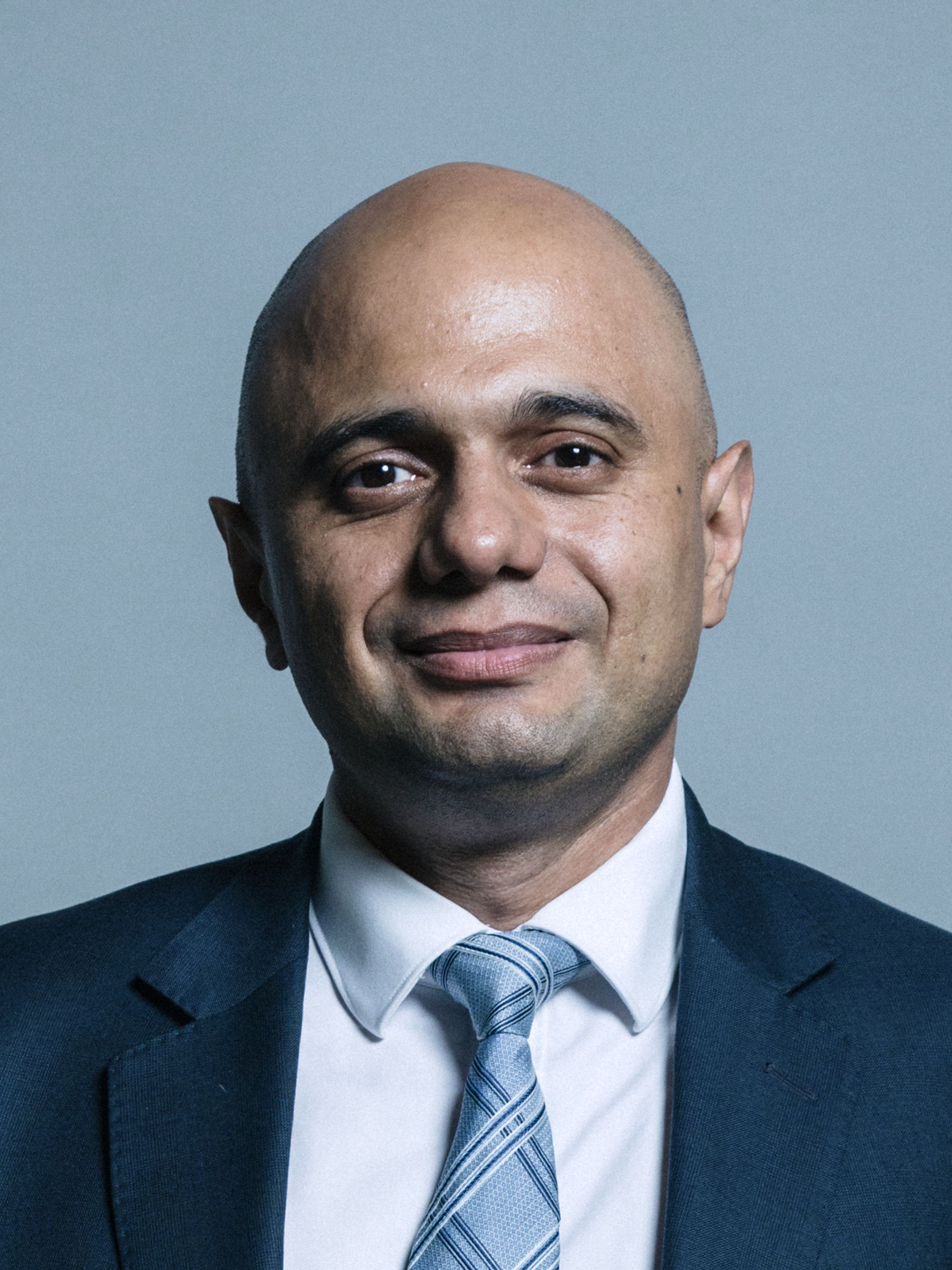
Official 2018 portrait of Javid

In May 2019, Javid launched his bid to become Conservative leader with pledge to deliver Brexit and to "bridge divides" by promoting the shared values which unite Britain. He finished in fourth place. Javid's campaign was advised by Matthew Elliott, former chief executive of Vote Leave. The campaign received funding from both Remain- and Leave-supporting Conservative donors.

Javid indicated he would be prepared to take Britain out of the EU without a deal, and called for no-deal preparations to be stepped up. Javid set out his Brexit strategy in a piece for the Daily Mail, declaring "no, no, no" to the idea of allowing either another Brexit referendum, an early general election or revoking of Article 50. Javid also proposed covering costs for implementing any new technology at the Irish border in a bid to try and break the deadlock over the Northern Ireland backstop. During the campaign, Javid also opposed the prorogation of parliament in order to deliver Brexit. He commented during the Channel 4 Conservative Party leadership debate, "You don't deliver on democracy by trashing democracy... We're not selecting a dictator of our country." A third-party tweet which contained part of this quote on his leadership campaign Twitter account was deleted on 29 August 2019, the day after Prime Minister Boris Johnson's controversial decision to prorogue parliament. In a BBC Radio 4 interview on 31 August, Javid defended the prime minister's prorogation of parliament. The prorogation was ruled to be unlawful on 24 September by the Supreme Court of the United Kingdom.

Javid said he was prepared to scrap the 45p rate of income tax entirely in a bid to inject more "dynamism" into the economy, pointing to the fact that tax revenues increased after the decision to cut the 50p rate of income tax to 45p and his role in making the case for it when he worked in the Treasury.

Javid was eliminated from the contest after achieving fewer votes than his three remaining competitors in the fourth round of voting.

==== Conservative leadership bid, 2022 ====
On 10 July 2022, Javid announced his candidacy to replace Johnson in the July 2022 Conservative Party leadership election, but withdrew prior to the first ballot.

=== Early parliamentary years (2010–2013) ===
Javid was briefly a member of the Work and Pensions Select Committee from June to November 2010, before relinquishing this position when he was appointed parliamentary private secretary (PPS) to John Hayes, then Minister of State for Further Education at the Department for Business, Innovation and Skills. Javid was one of the first MPs to become a PPS from the 2010 intake.

On 14 October 2011, as part of a small reshuffle prompted by the resignation of Liam Fox as Defence Secretary, Javid was promoted to become PPS to then Chancellor of the Exchequer, George Osborne.

==== Treasury ministerial roles ====
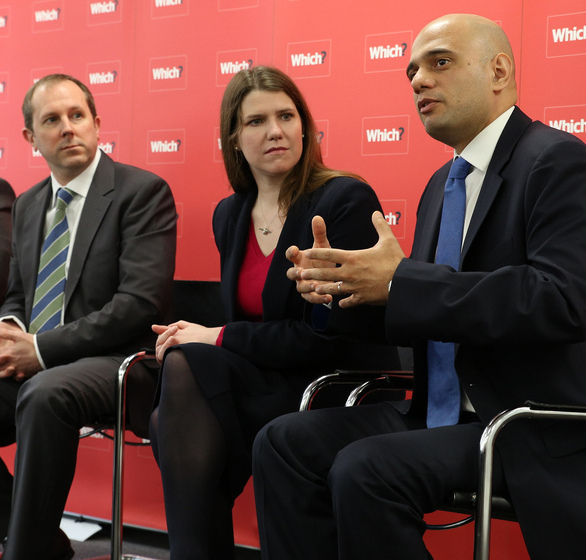
Treasury minister Javid discussing payday lending with Jo Swinson at the Which? ministerial credit visit in 2013

In September 2012, Javid joined Osborne's Ministerial team as Economic Secretary to the Treasury. He was later promoted to Financial Secretary to the Treasury on 7 October 2013, replacing Greg Clark.

As Economic Secretary, Javid was responsible for overseeing government plans for state-owned Royal Bank of Scotland Group and Lloyds Banking Group.

Javid proposed to scrap rebate taxes for overseas investors in a bid to boost the competitiveness of asset management in the UK.

In 2013, Javid was influential in getting the beer duty escalator abolished and cutting beer duty for the first time in over a half-century. In his honour, a commemorative beer was brewed called "Sajid's Choice" and served in the Strangers' Bar at the House of Commons and sold locally in Bromsgrove.

=== Culture Secretary ===
On 9 April 2014, David Cameron appointed Javid to the Cabinet as Secretary of State for Culture, Media and Sport and Minister for Equalities following the resignation of Maria Miller over her expenses. This made him the first MP to have been elected at the 2010 general election to join the Cabinet, and the first British Pakistani MP to lead a Government Department. Shortly after his appointment, he was made a Privy Councillor.

Javid defended media freedom and the right of the press to investigate wrongdoing by politicians and officials in his first appearance as Culture Secretary on BBC's Question Time programme. "The media are a cornerstone of our democracy, their freedom is very important and if they want to investigate wrongdoing by politicians or any other public official they should do that and nothing should stop them from doing that." It was reported in May 2015 that in March, Javid had opposed plans by then-Home Secretary Theresa May to give Ofcom "counter-extremism powers" to vet British television programmes before they were broadcast. In a letter to David Cameron, he commented that countries which had similar arrangements "are not known for their compliance with rights related to freedom of expression and the Government may not wish to be associated with such regimes".

His speech as Culture Secretary to the Union of Jewish Students' Annual Conference 2014 about the importance of diversity and free expression in the world of culture has been hailed by Isabel Hardman of The Spectator as "one of the finest speeches from a government minister I have ever read."

In 2015, at a Board of Deputies of British Jews hustings event, Javid stated that publicly funded cultural institutions that boycott Israel risk having their government grants cut. Citing a boycott of the UK Jewish Film Festival by the Tricycle Theatre in Kilburn, Javid said: "I have made it absolutely clear what might happen to their [the theatre's] funding if they try, or if anyone tries, that kind of thing again." British playwright Caryl Churchill raised concerns about political interference in the arts, and questioned: "All Charlie Hebdo? Except when freedom of expression means freedom to criticise Israel".

=== Business Secretary ===
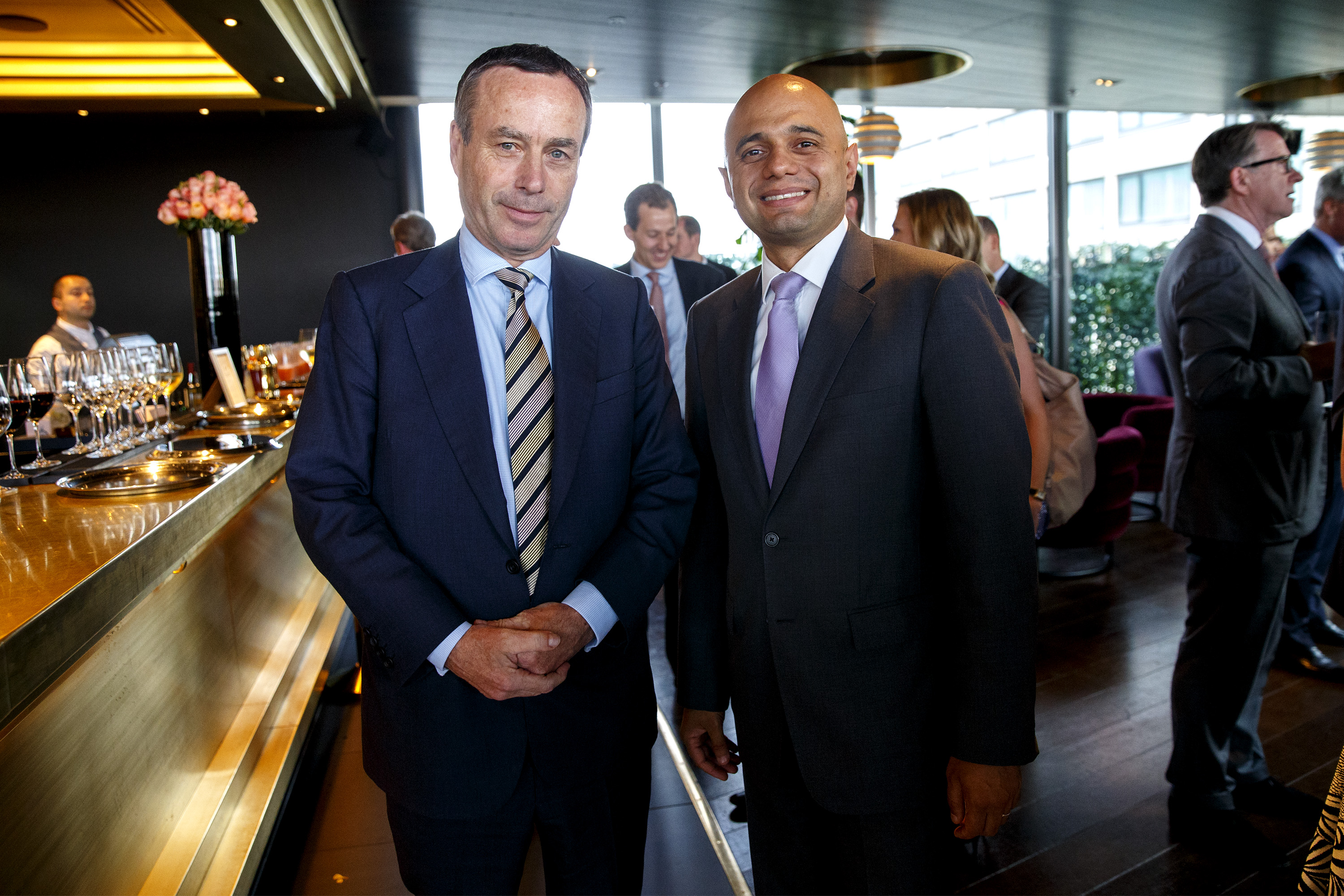
Lionel Barber and Javid, 2015 Financial Times Summer Party, Mondrian Hotel, London

Following the 2015 general election, Javid was appointed as Secretary of State for Business, Innovation and Skills in the new Conservative majority government under Prime Minister David Cameron. He was at this time described as "the most robust right-winger in the cabinet", and a "true Thatcherite".

After being appointed as Business Secretary, Javid said that there would be "significant changes" to strike laws under the new Conservative government, announcing that strikes affecting essential public services will need the backing of 40% of eligible union members under new government plans.

Javid believed the UK ought to remain in the European Union. He described himself as a Eurosceptic with "no time for ever-closer union", but he wrote in The Daily Telegraph, "Just like Bank of England Governor Mark Carney and IMF head Christine Lagarde, I still believe that Britain is better off in. And that's all because of the Single Market. It's a great invention, one that even Lady Thatcher campaigned enthusiastically to create."

In February 2017, it was revealed in court that Javid had ignored the advice of a senior civil servant in order to continue to grant export licences for weapons to Saudi Arabia, despite allegations of war crimes in the Saudi Arabian-led intervention in Yemen. A February 2016 email from Edward Bell, head of the Export Control Organisation, was read out as part of a judicial review into British arms sales to Saudi Arabia. The email said: "To be honest, and I was very direct and honest with [Sajid Javid], my gut tells me we should suspend [weapon exports to Saudi Arabia]". In a later email, he said: "[Sajid Javid] decided not to take a decision about this last night and the matter has now been raised with [the prime minister]".

Creation of a pubs code and pubs code adjudicator (PCA); the SBEE Act 2015 compelled the Business Secretary to create the office of the PCA in one year (s42 (1) SBEE Act 2015) i.e. by 26 March 2016. The code was not published until 20 July 2016 and came into force the following day 21 July 2016, the unlawful delay to the code was overseen by Sajid Javid. Pub tenants were denied an opportunity to use their rights for months as the statutory deadline had been broken. This unlawful delay also pushed forward the pubs code review until 2019, when the code review could have happened a year earlier in 2018.

=== Communities Secretary ===
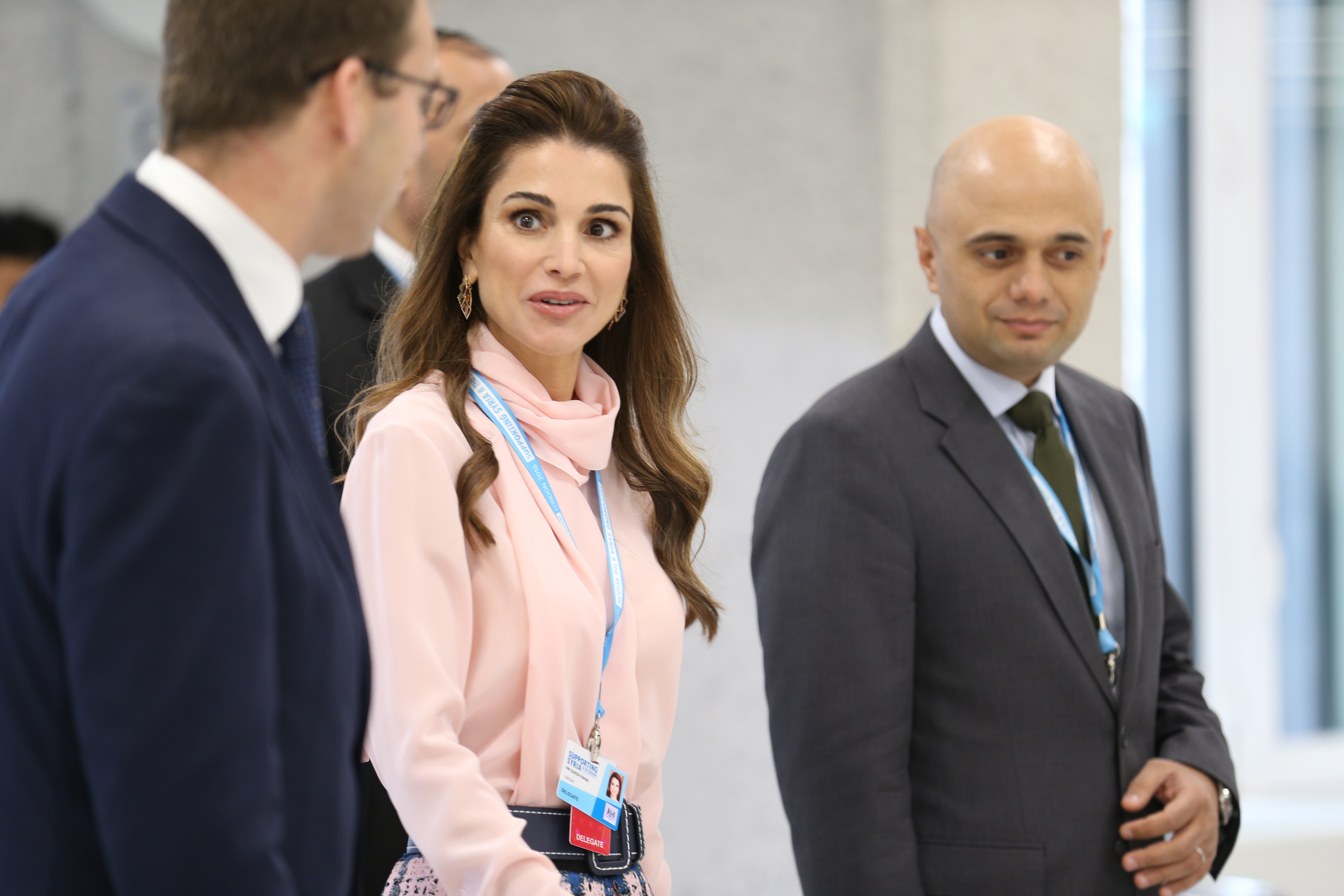
Queen Rania of Jordan and Javid, at Supporting Syria and the Region conference, 2016

In July 2016, Javid was appointed Secretary of State for Communities and Local Government by Prime Minister Theresa May. In the role, he focused on increasing housing supply, including delivering a new generation of affordable and council housing. He had previously described council homes as "poor housing for the poor", but helped secure funds for new local council building in the 2017 budget.

In 2017, Javid threatened to cancel Europe's largest Palestine convention, Palestine Expo. Javid, whose department controlled the QEII Centre, had warned that he was "minded" to cancel the event. Javid's intervention came amid claims by various Jewish and pro-Israel groups that the organisers had previously praised Hamas.

In 2017, a judge ruled that Javid acted unlawfully in issuing guidance to restrict local councils from pursuing Boycott, Divestment and Sanctions (BDS) against Israel through their pension schemes. The Chair of the Palestine Solidarity Campaign called it a "victory for Palestine, for local democracy, and for the rule of law".

As Communities Secretary, Javid launched a wide-ranging programme of leasehold and commonhold reform. This began with a forthright speech at the 2017 conference for the main leasehold property managers trade body ARMA (Association of Residential Managing Agents), where Javid targeted rogue managing agents as well as the exorbitant service charges faced by many leaseholders across England and Wales. This was well received by the Leasehold Knowledge Partnership charity. In September 2017, Javid championed innovation collaborative efforts between the UK and Commonwealth Nations by awarding the first Commonwealth Scholarship and Fellowship in Innovation to Joshua Cheong and Dr Khoo Hsien Hui respectively.

In December 2017, after a public consultation which attracted a high response rate, it was announced that efforts to end "feudal" leasehold practices would include a ban on future leasehold houses as well as setting ground rents in new build flats to zero. By April 2018, a series of policies aimed at regulating both the managing and letting agent sectors was unveiled such as a new system for leaseholders to challenge unfair service charges, empowering leaseholders to switch managing agent and requirements for managing and letting agents to professionalise their operations.

=== Home Secretary ===
On 30 April 2018, Javid was appointed as Home Secretary after Amber Rudd resigned for misleading MPs about "targets for removing illegal immigrants", a consequence of the ongoing Windrush scandal. Javid began his role saying that he was determined to fix the injustices of the Windrush scandal, and launched a consultation.

In becoming Home Secretary, he became the first person from an Asian background to hold one of the Great Offices of State in the UK. In his first months in charge, he put clear water between his tenure and Theresa May's lengthy stint at the Home Office. He offered an olive branch to the Police Federation, secured a review on medicinal cannabis oil, and won an increase in tier 2 visas for skilled workers. Javid won plaudits from Lord Tebbit, who suggested "Sajid Javid has seized control of his notoriously bloody minded department".

==== Immigration ====
In June 2018, Javid lifted the cap on immigration for NHS doctors and nurses and proposed adjustments to the "hostile environment" policy on immigration.

Javid has argued against EU citizens having preferential rights to live and work in the UK after Brexit, saying, "There's no magical reason it should be only from the EU and I think being a global Britain means that should be from across the world." This was seen to be at loggerheads with Chancellor of the Exchequer, Philip Hammond. Javid has said that EU citizens who have lived in the UK for at least five years would be eligible for a new "settled status" in the country post-Brexit.

Child chess prodigy Shreyas Royal was allowed to stay in the UK after Javid personally intervened in the case under "exceptional talent" rules; it is very rare for the talent of a child to be a consideration in an immigration case.

Javid unveiled plans at Cabinet for a crackdown on the number of low-skilled migrants coming to the UK after Britain leaves the EU, despite objections from Hammond and Greg Clark, the Business Secretary. It represented a significant victory for May and Javid and came after months of "Cabinet clashes" over the issue.

===== Asylum and re-migration =====
In January 2019, Javid suggested denying asylum to asylum-seekers coming across the English Channel, questioning whether they were "genuine" and vowing to "do everything we [the UK] can to make sure that you are often not successful". This was objected to as a violation of international law by bodies such as the Refugee Council and Amnesty International.

Javid made similar comments in February of that year when he said that British citizens who joined ISIS would not be allowed to return to the United Kingdom, despite a statement from the Justice Secretary David Gauke to the contrary. On 19 February, Javid revoked the British citizenship of Shamima Begum, a British 19-year-old who left to join ISIS in 2015, when she was 16. He said that she had Bangladeshi citizenship, the country of her mother which she had never lived in, but both the Bangladesh state authorities and Begum denied this. The government had already failed in a similar move involving statelessness and Britons of Bangladeshi descent in 2017.

This move enjoyed widespread popular support in the UK, with 78% of voters in a Sky News poll saying that Javid was right to strip her of her citizenship. However, Guardian journalist Amy Walker suggested that this feeling was not wholly shared in the area in which she formerly resided, Bethnal Green, and that many residents of the area did not believe she posed a threat or could not be reintegrated. Javid's decision was also opposed by Church of England bishops and Javid's political opponent, Shadow Home Secretary Diane Abbott, who said that the move was a breach of Begum's human rights. Amnesty International stated that revoking Begum's citizenship was "morally and legally questionable".

On 8 March 2019, it was announced by Begum's family and officers of the Democratic Federation of Northern Syria that Begum's newborn son had died. Javid was widely criticised for his actions, and held directly culpable for the death of the boy, Jarrah, by a number of commentators, including British human rights lawyer Clive Stafford Smith.

==== Police and crime ====
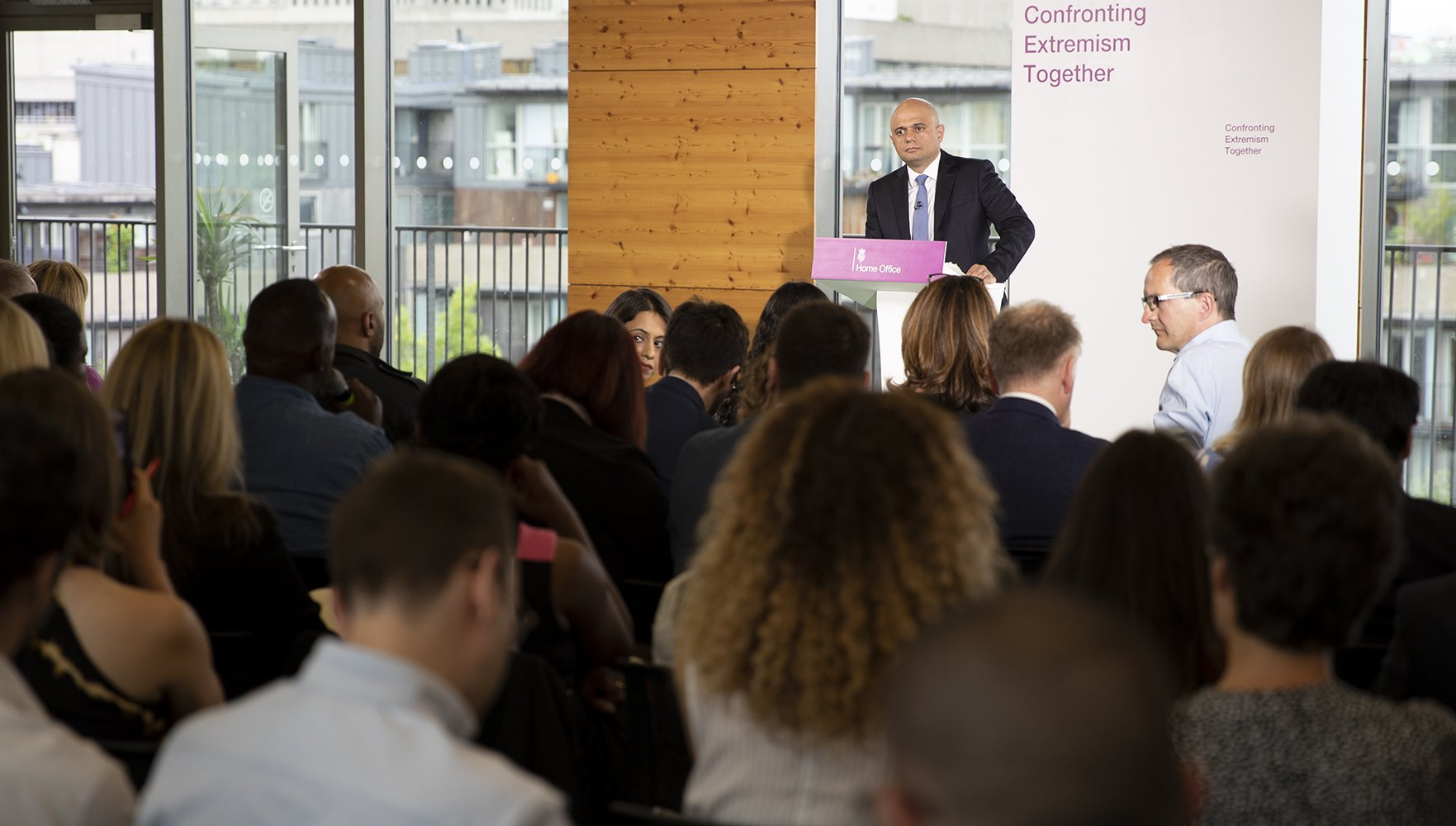
Home Secretary Javid, addressing a 2019 Conference on confronting extremism

In 2018, his first speech to the Police Federation, Javid said, "I'm listening and I get it". He then promised a shift in priorities in a bid to better protect police officers in the next Home Office spending review. In his speech, Javid gave his support to stop and search powers.

In July 2018, Javid announced the UK government would not object to the United States seeking the death penalty for two suspected British members of ISIL, waiving its long-standing objection to foreign executions.

In response to the child sexual exploitation scandal, Javid ordered research into why men convicted of grooming-gang sex crimes are disproportionately of Pakistani origin. He has argued that "we need an honest, open debate on child sexual exploitation, including racial motivation". The decision won praise, with Trevor Phillips suggesting "in his assault on liberal guilt over race, Sajid Javid is putting his Labour opponents to shame" and Camilla Cavendish commented that the "home secretary's heritage gives him a powerful voice against groomers".

Javid vowed to use counter-terrorism powers to strip dual citizens involved in child-grooming gangs and other serious crimes of their British citizenship. In December 2018, in what may be the first case of its kind, a man's dual citizenship was removed on the basis that when he applied to be a UK citizen he lied about the fact he was sexually abusing a child.

Javid launched an investigation into the Home Office's handling of forced marriage cases after The Times revealed that abusers are being handed visas. In a series of tweets, he said: "We will be doing more to combat it and support victims. Those who force British women into marriage, be warned that we are redoubling our efforts to make sure you pay for your crimes."

Javid rejected a cross-party demand to introduce exclusion zones around all abortion centres in England and Wales, saying it would not be a "proportionate response". More than 150 MPs wrote to Javid, shortly after he took over from Rudd, calling on him to introduce a national ban.

In 2018, Javid showed concern for the growing child abuse online making the use of technology insecure for children. He spoke at the NSPCC headquarters for online child sexual exploitation held on 3 September 2018. During his speech he announced the allocation of £21.5m for the investigation of the online child sex offenders on different technological and social platforms. He also announced the allocation of £26m for prevention activities to be carried out by different bodies.

==== Drug policy ====
Javid used an exceptional power as home secretary to issue a licence for a child with acute epilepsy to be treated with medical cannabis oil as a matter of urgency. Javid also launched a new panel to consider applications from patients seeking to use cannabis oil and announced a review of medicinal cannabis.

Following advice from the Chief Medical Officer and the Advisory Council on the Misuse of Drugs, Javid announced that medicinal cannabis will be available for prescription on the NHS. Javid, writing in The Times, stated that prescribing medicinal cannabis was not a step towards legalisation for recreational use.

==== Security ====
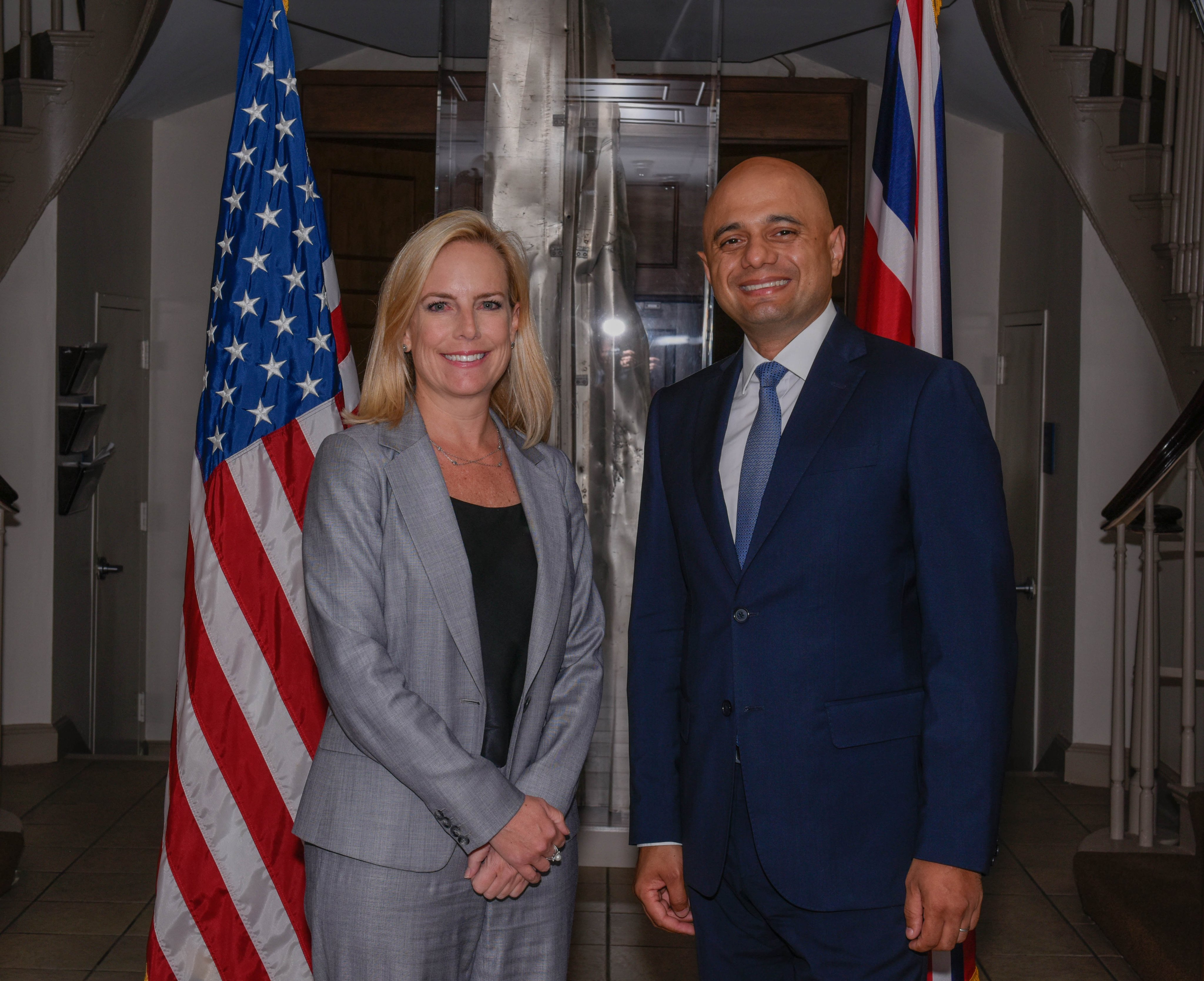
Home Secretary Javid with Kirstjen Nielsen, U.S. Secretary of Homeland Security, May 2018

In February 2019, Javid laid an order in Parliament adding Hezbollah's political wing to the UK's list of proscribed terror organisations.

In 2018, Javid was a keynote speaker at the Conservative Friends of Israel Conference and stated he intends to strengthen the partnership between UK and Israel, "especially in security".

In 2019, Javid announced the government would increase funding for the security of synagogues, schools and other Jewish centres. The government's new pledge will bring the amount it has allocated to the Jewish Community Protective Security Grant to £65.2 million since its introduction in 2015.

In response to the Christchurch mosque shootings, Javid warned social media firms that they would face the "force of the law" if they did not do more to remove extremist content and announced a forthcoming online harms white paper, which is expected to introduce legal regulation of online publishers and social media, including new censorship rules.

Javid has condemned some critics of the government's Prevent anti-terror scheme for being "on the side of the extremists."

==== Equality ====
Javid vowed to tackle anti-LGBT hate crime and set up a new LGBT Advisory Panel to deliver the Government's action plan. Javid apologised for historical homophobia within the Home Office: "Undercover police were instructed to loiter in bars, entrap gay men and put them in jail. Let me tell you, as the current Home Secretary, that was wrong, wrong, wrong, and I'm sorry that it ever happened".

Javid announced a full Law commission review of hate crime, including the possible addition of new "protected characteristics" such as misogyny and age in the same way as offences motivated by hostility based on race, religion, sexual orientation or disability. In 2018, charities estimated around one million older people were victims of physical, financial, psychological and sexual abuse each year. However, criminal convictions were rare and sentences considered lenient.

=== Chancellor of the Exchequer ===
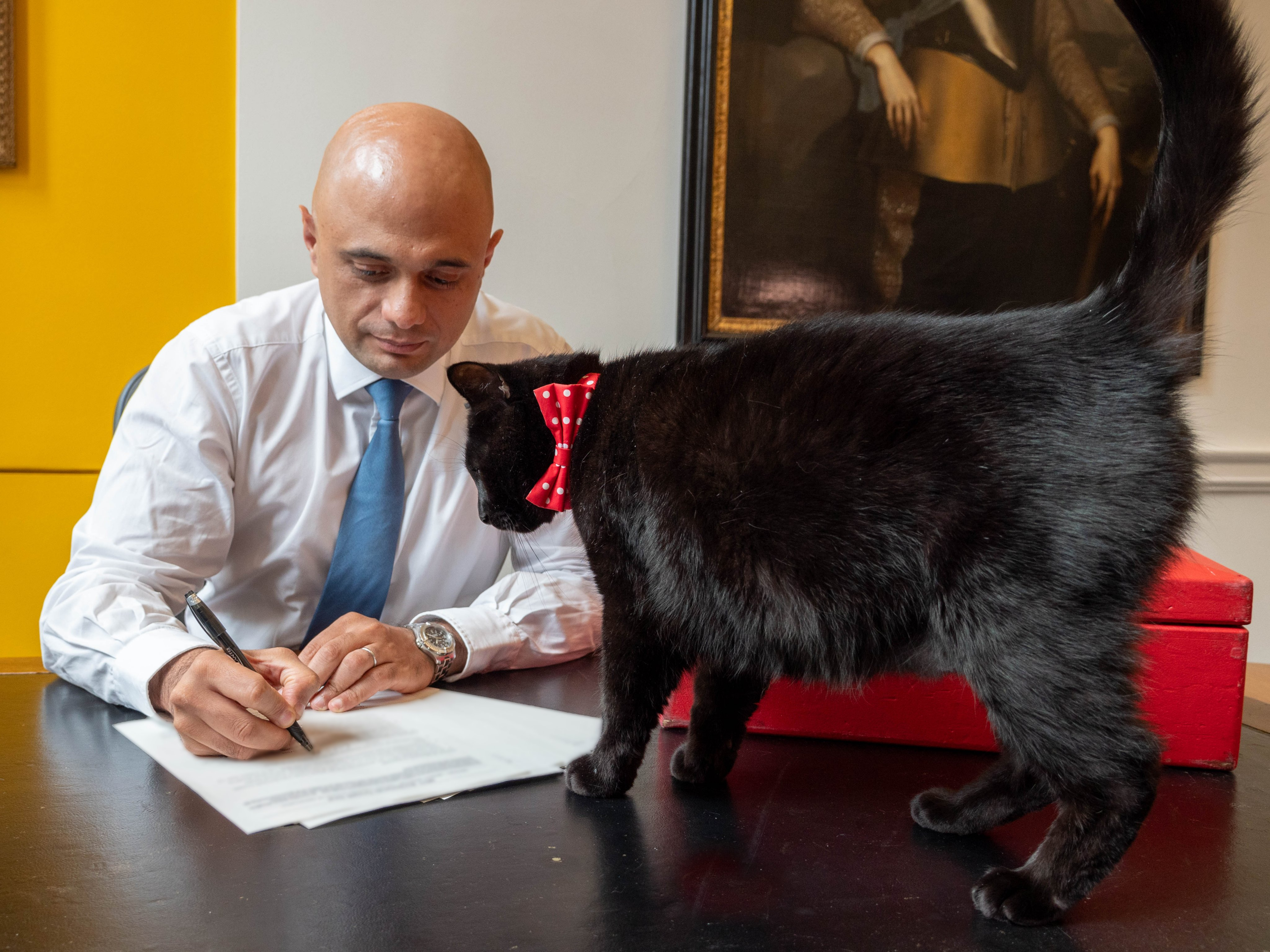
Javid in the Treasury after being appointed chancellor, with Gladstone, the Treasury cat

On 24 July 2019, Javid was appointed Chancellor of the Exchequer in the new Boris Johnson cabinet. Upon his appointment, he tweeted that he was looking forward to working at the Treasury to prepare the United Kingdom for leaving the EU. In his first media intervention after becoming Chancellor, Javid pledged in The Sunday Telegraph to overhaul the Treasury's approach to Brexit, beginning with "significant extra funding" to get Britain ready to leave with or without a deal.

In September 2019, Javid stood by Johnson's statement to suspend parliament and leave the EU. He confirmed that though Johnson would be looking for a new deal in the 17 October Council in Brussels, he would not ask for extension of Article 50 and hence the UK would leave the EU come 31 October. On 26 January 2020, a 50p coin to mark Brexit was unveiled by Javid, bearing the inscription 'Peace, prosperity and friendship with all nations' and the new leaving date of 31 January. Javid helped raise thousands of pounds at the Jewish Care business breakfast by auctioning a Brexit 50p coin, co-signed by himself and Boris Johnson.

Javid intervened to ensure Andrew Bailey was appointed as Governor of the Bank of England. Dominic Cummings had lobbied for appointment of Andy Haldane to take over from Mark Carney as Governor.

==== Resignation ====
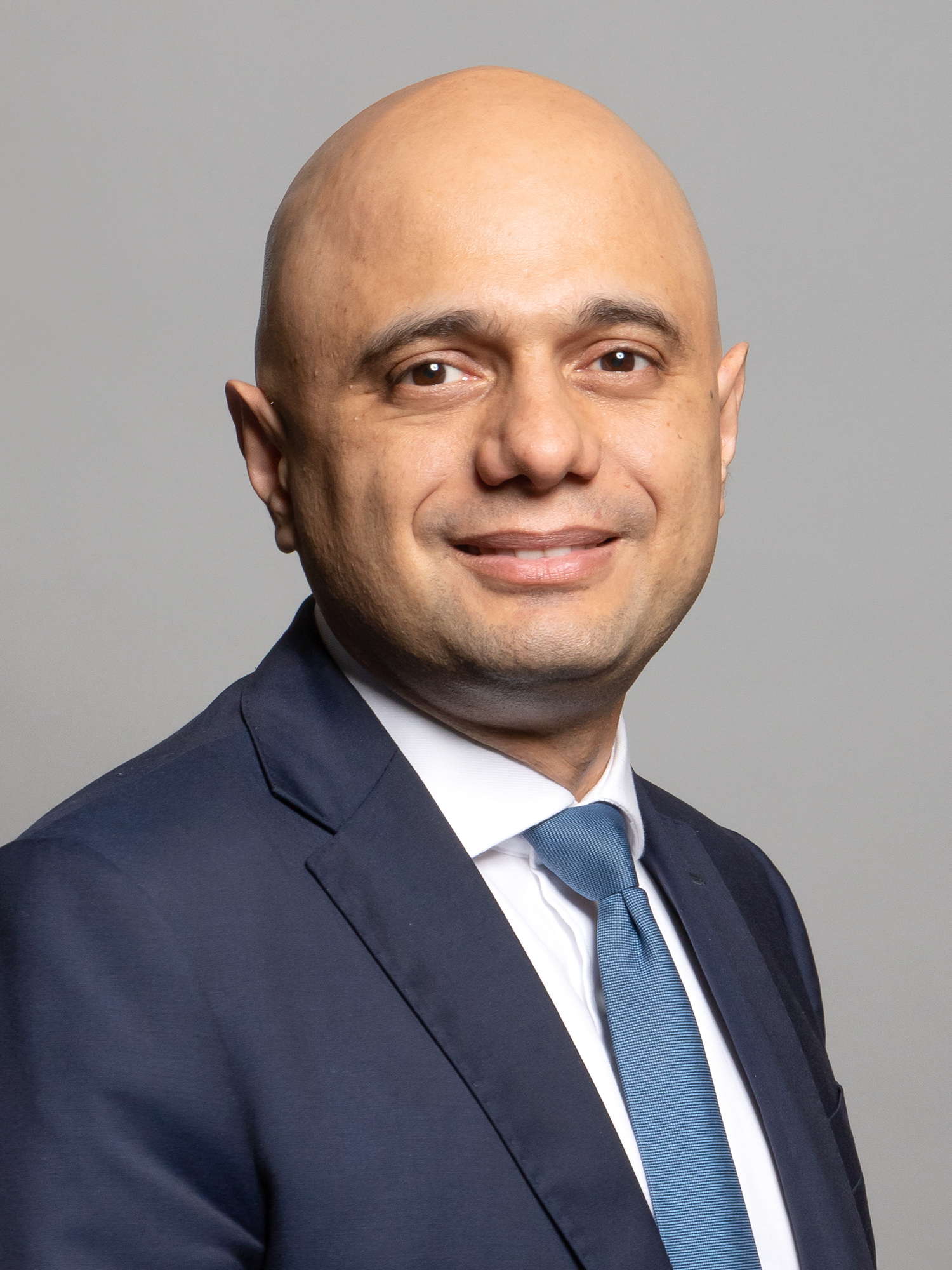
Javid's official portrait, 2020

Tensions between 10 Downing Street and Treasury had come to a head during August 2019, when the prime minister's chief adviser Dominic Cummings relieved one of Chancellor Javid's aides, Sonia Khan, of her employment, without Javid's permission and without informing him. It was alleged that, during her dismissal, Cummings "went outside No 10 and asked an armed officer to enter the building and escort Khan off the premises." Javid "voiced anger" to Johnson over the dismissal of Khan and Cummings faced the prospect of a probe by a governmental ethics watchdog following the dismissal. In November 2019, following questions of a rift between Johnson and Javid, Johnson gave his assurance that he would retain Javid as Chancellor following the 2019 general election. Javid had also lost another long-term special adviser Salma Shah among tensions with number 10.

However, in the weeks leading up to the reshuffle, a number of briefings in the press had suggested that a new economic ministry led by Rishi Sunak might be established, to reduce the power and political influence of the Treasury. Sunak was considered to be a Johnson loyalist, seen as the "rising star" minister who had ably represented the prime minister during the 2019 election debates. By February 2020, it was reported that Javid would remain in his role as Chancellor and that Sunak would stay on as Chief Secretary to the Treasury, in order to "keep an eye" on Javid.

On 13 February 2020, the day of the reshuffle, Javid resigned as Chancellor of the Exchequer, following a meeting with the prime minister. During the meeting, Johnson had offered to let him keep his position on the condition that he fire all of his advisers at the Treasury, to be replaced with individuals selected by Number 10. Upon resigning, Javid told PA Media that "no self-respecting minister would accept those terms".

The Chancellor's resignation was unexpected, given Johnson's commitment to retain Javid within the Cabinet and recent reports that an alternative finance ministry would not be made. Robert Shrimsley, chief political commentator of the Financial Times, stated that the prime minister's choices at the time risked damaging the government, that "good government often depends on senior ministers – and the Chancellor in particular – being able to fight bad ideas". Javid became the first Chancellor in 50 years not to deliver a budget. His time as Chancellor, 204 days, at the time represented the second-fewest days in office since the Second World War.

=== Return to the backbenches ===
Javid returned to being a backbench MP after resigning as Chancellor. In his first speech as a backbencher, after Prime Minister's Questions, he said that he felt he still had "more to give" in regards to his political future.

In June 2020, Javid announced that he would be working with the Centre for Social Justice think tank to lead an inquiry into child sexual abuse in the UK. He wrote in The Daily Telegraph of his concern that the COVID-19 pandemic lockdown was leading to a surge in child sexual abuse cases.

Javid was a senior fellow at Harvard University's Harvard Kennedy School, Mossavar-Rahmani Center for Business and Government in 2020–2021.

In August 2020, Javid began in a paid role as a senior adviser to JPMorgan Chase. He joined on the bank's Europe, Middle East and Africa advisory council. His appointment was criticised by Labour MP Zarah Sultana as "undermining democracy" and she advocated the banning of MPs from taking second jobs.

=== Health Secretary ===
Javid replaced Matt Hancock as Secretary of State for Health and Social Care on 26 June 2021 during the COVID-19 pandemic, following Hancock's resignation.

Javid took over the prominent role in the government's response to the COVID-19 pandemic as the SARS-CoV-2 Delta variant was driving a third wave in cases across the country. Despite this, Javid confirmed that he would push for an end to public health restrictions, saying: "We are going to have to learn to accept the existence of COVID and find ways to cope with it – just as we already do with flu", a strategy supported by other Conservative MPs but prompting criticism from some scientists and health experts. He said the country could have as many as "100,000 daily cases", while pushing for relaxation of social distancing and self-isolation rules, and saying "there is no going back".

On 17 July 2021, Javid tested positive for COVID-19. Eight days later, he reported that he had recovered. He was criticised for insensitivity by several opposition MPs and the pressure group Covid-19 Bereaved Families for Justice for saying "if you haven't yet – get your jab, as we learn to live with, rather than cower from, this virus". Javid later deleted the tweet and apologised for the "cower" remark, stating: "It was a poor choice of word" and that he was "expressing gratitude that the vaccines help us fight back as a society."

In early September 2021, although the JCVI "failed to recommend COVID-19 vaccines for healthy 12- to 15-year-olds, and instead advised that more children with underlying health conditions and vulnerable relatives should be offered the jab", Javid announced a plan to make vaccines available for the age group. Javid also announced plans to make COVID-19 vaccines compulsory for all NHS and care home staff. He was warned of staff shortages as a result of this policy.

In a press conference in October 2021, Javid rejected calls to reintroduce general public health measures such face mask mandates and more home working, as COVID-19 cases, hospitalisations and deaths began to rise. He warned the country could report 100,000 daily cases over the winter. He encouraged the public to follow government advice and for those who had not been vaccinated to do so.

==== Resignation ====
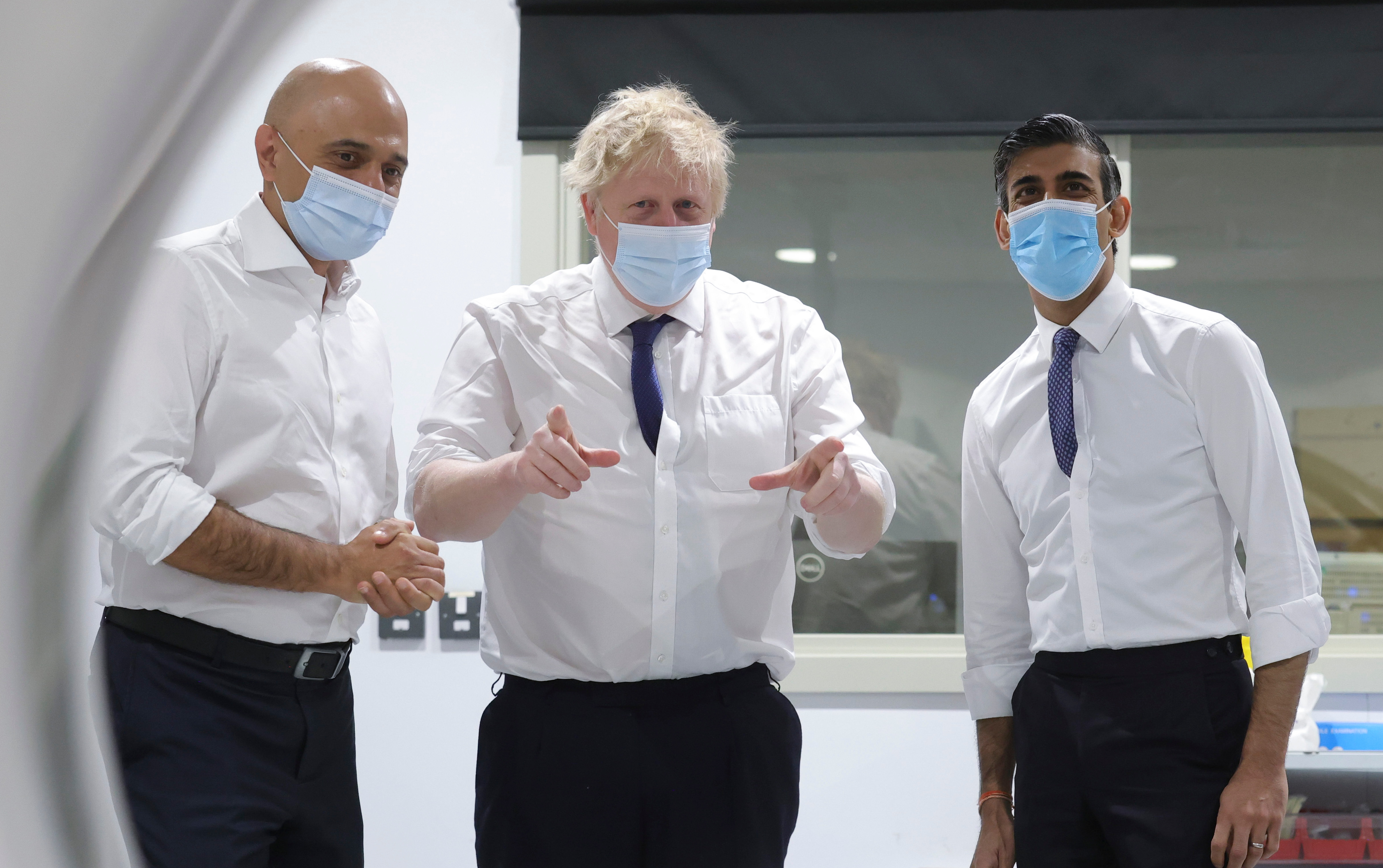
Javid (left) and Rishi Sunak (right) (the first two cabinet members to resign on 5 July) pictured with Boris Johnson (centre)

On 5 July 2022, Javid resigned as Health Secretary, in the fallout from controversy around sexual assault by former Deputy Chief Whip Chris Pincher, and suppression of reports by the Conservative Party. Javid said that he had originally given Johnson the benefit of the doubt, but decided to resign following a Parliament prayer breakfast about integrity in public life. In his resignation letter to Boris Johnson, Javid said: "The tone you set as a leader, and the values you represent, reflect on your colleagues, your party and ultimately the country. Conservatives at their best are seen as hard-headed decision-makers, guided by strong values. We may not have always been popular, but we have been competent in acting in the national interest. Sadly, in the current circumstances, the public are concluding that we are now neither."

On 6 July 2022, Javid delivered in addition to the letter a personal statement in the House of Commons, calling on colleagues to consider following his lead of resigning from cabinet. He mentioned "enough is enough" and "I also believe a team is as good as its team captain, and that a captain is as good as his or her team. So loyalty must go both ways. The events of recent months have made it increasingly difficult to be in that team."

Following the resignations of Javid and Sunak, numerous junior ministers and among the parliamentary private secretary (PPS) also resigned, most of whom cited a lack of honesty and integrity on the part of Johnson. In the following 24 hours, 36 MPs resigned from their roles in government. This marked both the largest number of ministerial resignations in a 24-hour period since the British Empire Economic Conference in 1932, and the largest number of such resignations on record. After a total of 62 resignations, Johnson announced on 7 July his intention to resign as Conservative leader and prime minister, but said he would remain prime minister until a new leader was in place.

=== Return to the backbenches ===
Javid supported Liz Truss during the July–September 2022 Conservative Party leadership election, and Rishi Sunak in the October 2022 Conservative Party leadership election.

In December 2022, Javid said that he would not stand for re-election at the 2024 general election.

== Post-political career ==
On 18 September 2024, the Holocaust Memorial Day Trust announced the appointment of Javid as their next chair. He took up the position in July 2025. Javid's memoir, The Colour of Home: Growing up in 1970s Britain was published in February 2026.

== Political positions ==
=== Brexit ===
In 2016, Javid became a supporter of remaining in the European Union as a member of the Britain Stronger in Europe advocacy group in the EU referendum campaign. In the event, the public narrowly voted to leave the EU, resulting in Brexit, the UK's withdrawal from the European Union. Javid was a supporter of the single market, describing it as a "great invention, one that even Prime Minister Thatcher campaigned enthusiastically to create."

Javid is known to have historically held Eurosceptic views; as a student in 1990 he was thrown out of the Conservative Party conference for handing out leaflets opposing Britain joining the European Exchange Rate Mechanism, the forerunner of the single currency.

In 2015, Javid was an advocate for holding an EU referendum. While pro-Brexit Conservatives had long assumed he would join the Leave campaign, in the end he backed Remain. He was not often seen as very committed to that cause, and subsequently became a Leave supporter. While Javid said this was not as a result of pressure from either David Cameron or George Osborne, the Financial Times reported that Osborne "got the thumbscrews out" because it would have been completely unacceptable for a Conservative Business Secretary to have advocated Brexit.

Javid has maintained his position that politicians should respect the result of the referendum, and when judges ruled that the PM could not trigger the formal Brexit process without Parliament's backing, Javid accused British High Court judges of attempting to thwart the will of the British people.

Since the referendum Javid said that he was sceptical of softer Brexit options such as remaining in the customs union, saying the free trade area was an "intrinsic" part of the European Union and that voters had given "clear instructions" when they voted to Leave.

In 2019, Javid said he considered the Brexit Party not to be extremist and praised Nigel Farage: "I applaud Nigel Farage for walking away, calling UKIP thugs and extremists." The move was seen by some as an effort by the Conservative Party to "extend an olive branch" to the Brexit Party.

As Chancellor, Javid drew up plans for millions of 50p Brexit coins to be minted in time for Britain's departure from the EU. Javid's proposal for the coins to be produced for mass circulation was portrayed as a statement of intent that the Treasury is fully behind Brexit, in contrast to previous Chancellor Philip Hammond. In January 2020, Javid said regarding the future relationship with the EU: "There will not be alignment, we will not be a ruletaker, we will not be in the single market and we will not be in the customs union – and we will do this by the end of the year".

=== Israel and Palestine ===
A long-time supporter of Conservative Friends of Israel, Javid was one of Israel's staunchest supporters in the Cabinet. At a 2012 event hosted by CFI, he said he would, out of all the countries in the Middle East, choose Israel as home: only there, he said, would his children feel the warm embrace of freedom and liberty.

Addressing the World Jewish Congress (WJC) in 2017, Javid commented that attempts to block contacts with Israel are failing, and that the government will "celebrate the Balfour centenary with pride". Ronald Lauder, president of the WJC, said the global Jewish community "treasured" Mr Javid as a staunch friend of the Jewish people.

At a joint meeting between the American Jewish Committee and the Board of Deputies of British Jews, Javid told his audience, "As long as I am in government, as long as I am in politics, I promise you that I will do everything within my power to fight back against those who seek to isolate and undermine Israel".

At the Conservative Friends of Israel Conference of 2018, Javid explained how a school trip to Israel by his brother forty years ago set off his lifelong support for Israel and added, "my dad explained the history, how it came about and why it is such a special place. Since then I always wanted to visit." Javid visited when he and his wife spent their honeymoon there.

==== Visit to the Western Wall ====
In 2019, Javid became the first British minister in 19 years to visit the Western Wall in the Old City of Jerusalem. Visits to the Western Wall by foreign dignitaries are opposed by Palestinians, who say they legitimise Israeli claims to the eastern half of the city, which they claim for the capital of a future Palestinian state.

Javid was advised by officials not to visit the Western Wall during a visit to Israel because of "long-standing policy of over two-decades". In January 2020, at the reception of Conservative Friends of Israel, he told the audience that his response was – "You know what? I told them to 'get stuffed' and I went anyway".

==== Campaign against BDS ====
Javid has a history of campaigning against Boycott, Divestment and Sanctions (BDS). In 2014, he told attendees at the Union of Jewish Students conference that he will "always be proud to stand up and resist calls for boycotts of Israel". In 2015, as Culture Secretary, Javid advised The Board of Deputies that he had "no tolerance for cultural boycotts of Israel".

In 2016, as Communities Secretary, Javid announced measures to prevent British councils from imposing boycotts of Israel and issued local authorities' with investment guidance affecting Local Government Pension Scheme (LGPS).

In 2018, at a Conservative Friends of Israel conference, Javid detailed his parliamentary record against BDS: "When I became the Business Secretary I was lobbied every day to support the BDS campaign. I thought the best reaction is obviously not to support the campaign but to do everything I could to boost trade with Israel."

=== Affiliations ===
Javid paid subscriptions to pro-Brexit group the European Research Group (ERG) from 2013 to 2016.

== Political influences ==
=== Thatcherism ===
Javid's father inspired a devotion to Margaret Thatcher in Javid: "My dad lived through the Winter of Discontent and used to vote Labour, but switched to Thatcher, saying, 'look how she's sorting out the country'. I agreed".

Javid has spoken of Thatcher's handling of the Falklands Conflict as a defining moment, saying, "That was a big moment for me in understanding war and how it happens, and admiring Margaret Thatcher and her decisiveness. That's how my political awareness really took off."

In 2013, when he became Financial Secretary to the Treasury, he rejected works of art from the Government Art Collection and personalised his office with a portrait of Thatcher. Javid was described by Tim Montgomerie as the "first of Thatcher's children".

Javid met the former Prime Minister at a Conservative Party fundraiser in his late twenties and at the meeting Thatcher purportedly said, "Sajid, you will protect our great island."

=== The Fountainhead ===
In 2018, activist Tim Montgomerie wrote that Javid "identifies the libertarian writer Ayn Rand as an inspiration". Javid recounted once that he regularly reread the courtroom scene from her novel The Fountainhead, saying that he admired its description of "the power of the individual ... sticking up for your beliefs, against popular opinion". At a Crossbench Film Society event, Javid chose to introduce the film version of The Fountainhead and described the profound effect it had on him after watching it as a 12-year-old. Javid's wife once threatened to divorce him if he did not stop reading The Fountainhead aloud to her.

Javid said in 2019 that he had never believed in Rand's philosophy of Objectivism, stating he is instead motivated by altruism and appreciates The Fountainhead because he identifies with the main protagonist: "It's about the underdog. Whatever Howard Roark wanted to do there were people lining up against him and saying—'no, you will fail'—and he kept going right to the end".

=== Neoconservatism ===
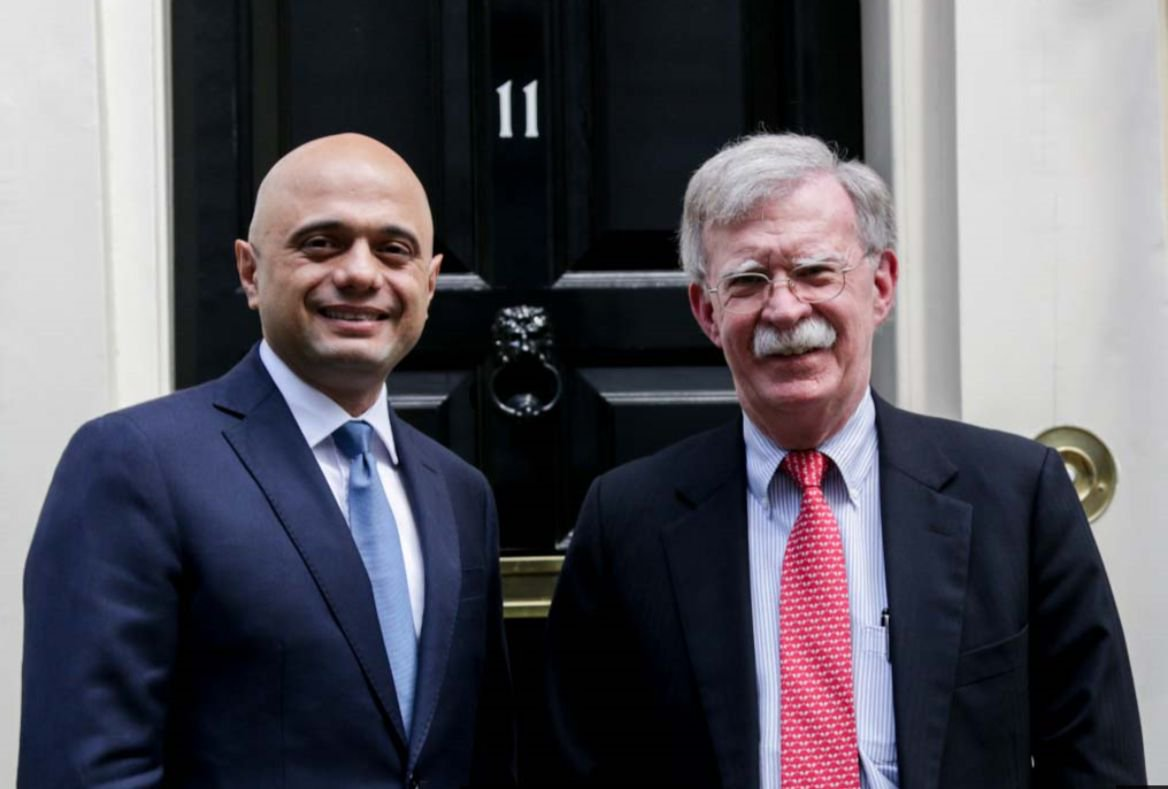
Javid meeting John Bolton, United States National Security Advisor, at 11 Downing Street in 2019

Javid has been a regular attendee and speaker at the annual conference of the US neoconservative thinktank American Enterprise Institute, whose members include Dick Cheney, Paul Wolfowitz and John Bolton. (Note: In 2016, as Business Secretary, Javid turned down meeting with Welsh MPs to discuss the Tata Steel crisis to attend the AEI's conference.) Javid has consistently supported foreign military intervention, having voted for intervening in Gaddafi's Libya, as well as air strikes in Iraq and Syria.

In March 2014, Javid accused then-Labour Party leader Ed Miliband of having some responsibility for the crisis in Crimea, alleging that there was "a direct link" between Miliband's refusal to support military intervention in Syria and the subsequent Russian activity in Ukraine.

In 2018, Javid declared in his Commons register of interests that the AEI had paid £9,266 to fund his trip to the conference in Georgia.

== Personal life ==
=== Family ===
Javid was raised in a two-bed flat above a shop in Bristol with four brothers. His brother Bas Javid was Commander of Solihull Police division, and later promoted as Commander at Scotland Yard, in charge of front-line policing. Bas Javid had previously served in the Royal Navy, wherein his military service included the Gulf War, for which he received a commendation for teamwork and bravery.

In 1997, Javid married his childhood sweetheart Laura King, whom he met while sharing a stapler at the local Commercial Union branch during a summer job. She is a church-going Christian and they have four children. The couple had their honeymoon in Israel. Their children are privately educated, something that Javid attributed to the couple's desire to "do what's best for them". The family own properties in Fulham, Chelsea, Bristol and Bromsgrove. They own a Cavapoo named Bailey, which featured prominently in Javid's 2019 campaign video to be Conservative Party leader.

Javid's eldest brother Tariq died in July 2018 in "an unnatural death"; a full inquest was held, in which the coroner ruled Tariq had intentionally killed himself after drinking alcohol and taking codeine at the luxury South Lodge Hotel, which was near his home in Horsham. In a letter left to Sylvia, his partner of 15 years, Tariq suggested that, due to ill health, he would not "last long". Tariq was a successful businessman and managed a supermarket chain.

His other siblings are Khalid, a financial adviser; Basit, a civil servant; and Atif, a multi-millionaire property tycoon.

Before he became an MP, Javid was briefly a director of Atif's main investment vehicle, SA Capital.

=== Honours ===
Javid was appointed Knight Bachelor in the 2024 New Year Honours for political and public service.

=== Religion ===
Javid is said to have received religious hate mail in the form of a "Punish a Muslim Day" parcel; as of March 2018, he was the fifth British MP to receive such abuse. While his family's heritage is Muslim, Javid himself is non-practising. His wife is a practising Christian. Addressing a church-hosted husting in his inaugural election campaign for Bromsgrove on 22 April 2010, Javid told the audience:

My own family's heritage is Muslim. Myself and my four brothers were brought up to believe in God, but I do not practise any religion. My wife is a practising Christian and the only religion practised in my house is Christianity.

Javid has said that it is "lazy" and "wrong" to suggest terror has nothing to do with Islam. Speaking at a Muslim News Awards ceremony in 2017, Javid said that those who attack and kill in the name of Islam had no right to do so and that "we can't deny that these people think they are Muslims. They identify as Muslims. They genuinely believe they are acting for the glory of Islam." Javid wrote in The Times that, "there's a special, unique burden on the Muslim community" to do something about terrorism.

Javid has criticised those in the Muslim community who question his Muslim faith and refer to him as a "Coconut" or an "Uncle Tom".

In March 2019, Wayne Kirby, a Tommy Robinson supporter, was jailed for 28 days for posting threatening and abusive comments on Facebook about Javid. Kirby referred to Javid as "a Muslim terrorist" and threatened Javid would be "hung, drawn and quartered" if anything happened to Robinson.

In 2021, Javid said he was rejected early in his political career by a Conservative Association to be their candidate because of his religion and that an Association Chairman had explained: "some members didn't think locals would vote for a Muslim to be their MP".

== Notes ==
Parliament of the United Kingdom
Preceded by Julie Kirkbride	Member of Parliament for Bromsgrove; 2010–2024	Succeeded by Bradley Thomas
Political offices
Preceded by Maria Miller	Secretary of State for Culture, Media and Sport; 2014–2015	Succeeded by John Whittingdale
Preceded by Vince Cable	Secretary of State for Business, Innovation and Skills; 2015–2016	Succeeded by Greg Clark
Preceded by Greg Clark	Secretary of State for Housing, Communities and Local Government; 2016–2018	Succeeded by James Brokenshire
Preceded by Amber Rudd	Home Secretary; 2018–2019	Succeeded by Priti Patel
Preceded by Philip Hammond	Chancellor of the Exchequer; 2019–2020	Succeeded by Rishi Sunak
Preceded by Matt Hancock	Secretary of State for Health and Social Care; 2021–2022	Succeeded by Steve Barclay
