= The Student Journals =

Student-run publication

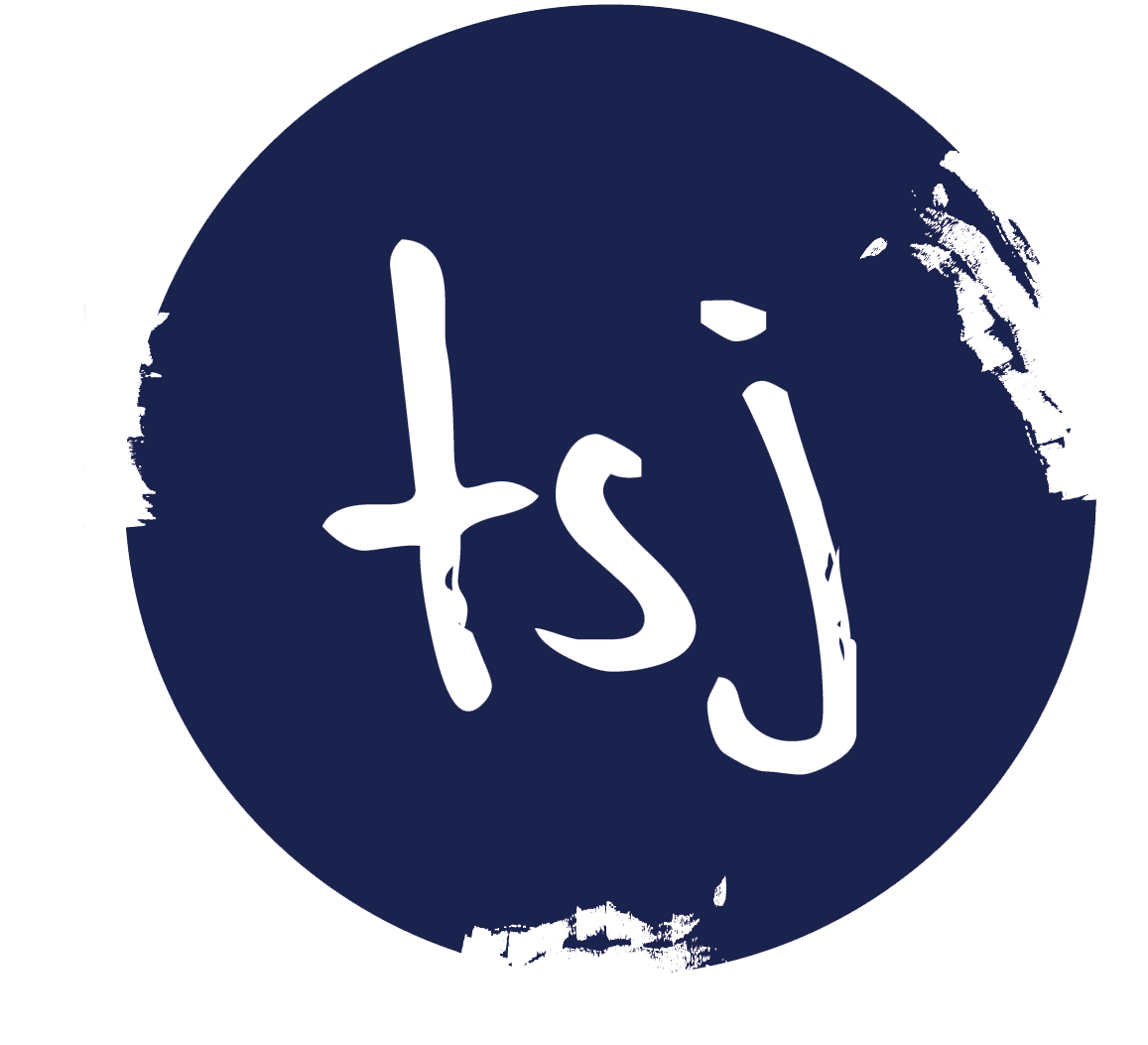
- Type: Online magazine
- Editor: Amy Ashenden
- Managing editor: Siraj Datoo
- Founded: 2010
- Ceased publication: 2014
- Language: English
- Website: studentjournals.co.uk

The Student Journals was an editorially independent online magazine for university students around the world, to give students a platform to voice their opinions. The site featured regular comment articles submitted on numerous topics, ranging from education and politics to culture and sport. They also feature interviews and cover many British events through live blogs. Since its founding, The Student Journals launched several diverging projects including the TSJ Advisors Scheme, whereby professional journalists give detailed feedback to commentators of the site, helping students to improve their writing.

The Student Journals has been recognised through various awards, such as being named the Runner Up Website of the Year at the Guardian Student Media Awards in 2011. In the same year, it was voted the 25th best Group blog in the country and the 46th best Media blog in the UK. It was also featured as one of the best student publications of the month in Ones to Watch in September 2011.

== History ==
The Student Journals was founded in October 2010 by Siraj Datoo, a University of Warwick student and the website's managing editor, with Ali Gokal, a friend from Watford Grammar School for Boys. Datoo claims to be inspired by the editor of The Muslim News, Ahmed Versi, founder of a newspaper for Muslims who did not have a political voice in Britain. Datoo also felt that students needed a platform to express their opinion without any editorial bias, where every student could write, regardless of their political opinion. With Gokal's support, they went about creating the website.

== Aims ==
When they launched the site, Datoo and Gokal set three main aims (as outlined on the site): To give university students a platform to express their opinions on a national scale, to present students the opportunity to be involved in journalism at a higher level (through interviewing high-profile personalities and attending events to review music, theatre, books and films as de facto members of the press.) They also state that they want to develop a journalistic style and help budding writers achieve their potential. It is for this reason that every article that is submitted to the site receives detailed feedback. The TSJ Advisors Scheme also serves this purpose.

== Awards and recognition ==
=== 2013 ===
==== Guardian Student Media Awards ====
The Student Journals was named Website of the Year at the Guardian Student Media Awards after being shortlisted for the award for the second time in three years. One of the writers, Hana Alidina, from Smith College was shortlisted for the inaugural award in the category of "Student data interactive journalist of the year". Co-founder and managing editor Siraj Datoo was shortlisted for the "Digital Journalist of the Year" category.

=== 2011 ===
==== Guardian Student Media Awards and others ====
The Student Journals was named the runner-up in the category of 'Website of the Year' at The Guardian Student Media Awards, who praised the overall concept, the breadth of articles and the high editorial standard. MyNewsBiz 2011 called The Student Journals "an idea with lots of potential and a great proof of concept" and was commended by the judges in their student journalism enterprise competition.

==== Total Politics Blog Awards 2011 ====
In the Total Politics Blog Awards 2011, it was named the 25th best Group blog in the country and the 46th best Media blog. Many of those involved with The Student Journals were also recognized in these awards. The editor at the time, Siraj Datoo, was named the 23rd best media blogger in the UK, the Deputy Editor, Ali Gokal, was named the 25th best left-wing blogger in the country and press officer, Tash Clark, was also named the 42nd best media blogger in the country. A number of Commentators for the site were also featured in the awards, with Henry Hill being named the 8th best Conservative blogger and Jordan Bishop placing at number 34 in the list of best Non-Aligned bloggers in the country.

== Exclusives ==
On 16 May 2011, The Student Journals reporter Sabine Saade broke the story that Ben Ali did not intend to abdicate, after the Independent's foreign correspondent Robert Fisk revealed it in an exclusive interview: "He wanted to drop off his family in Saudi Arabia and take the next plane to Tunisia at 7:30am but the crew that accompanied him to Riyadh flew back at 1.30 am without him."

== Notable Interviews ==
The website has interviewed important personalities including the Director of Amnesty International UK, Kate Allen, Foreign Correspondent for The Independent, Robert Fisk and the editor of the Hurriyet Daily News, Mustafa Akyol.

== Projects ==
=== TSJ Advisors ===
The Student Journals has launched several projects since its creation. Through the TSJ Advisors Scheme professional journalists edit articles for the website in order to help students becoming better journalists and improve their writing. Contributing journalists include Deputy Editor of the New Statesman Helen Lewis, News Editor of Guardian.co.uk Jonathan Haynes, Assistant Books editor of The Daily Telegraph Sameer Rahim, and freelance journalist Dan Hancox.

=== TSJ Youth ===
TSJ Youth allows students not yet to write for the site, but to give younger students the same platform. Each student writing for TSJ Youth is given feedback and support from editors to help improve their writing.

=== TSJ Global ===
On the one-year anniversary of their launch, TSJ Global was launched, with the first article being written by Boston University graduate Diptesh Soni. Students from around the world now write for the website.

== Website down ==
The Student Journals website has been down since June 2015 with no signs of starting up again. Its Twitter account has been inactive since December 2014.
