= Work–life balance in Germany =

Average annual hours actually worked per worker in OECD countries from 1970 to 2020

There are different approaches to defining work–life balance in Germany. On the one hand work–life balance (WLB) is seen as a popular, but also imprecise term that covers from a scientific perspective, not a single phenomenon, but rather an entire subject area. In the focus of this subject area, stand aspects of the relationship and interplay between work and private life. In this connection the work component refers to the paid work and the life component to the other areas of life such as family, friendships, social and cultural commitment, health behavior, and other things.

Similarly is a further definition, in which the WLB is depicted as two scales, one for the life component and the other for the work component, which should be balanced. In the shell, which stands for life, hobbies, sports, travel, cultural interests, society, friends and family were put inside. In the shell, which stands for work is the job that is a serious block opposed to the more pleasurable experiences. Thus working gets back the negative meaning which the linguists attributed the term in its origins. But also outside of the family, needs and responsibilities are waiting to be fulfilled, therefore, also in this area it can be spoken of work.

== Discussion in Germany ==
More and more companies are thinking seriously about WLB concepts. After all, a non-existing balance between work and private life has negative consequences. These consequences include, for example lower job performance, higher absenteeism, more mistakes and incorrect decisions, worse working atmosphere, depending on labor market situation more willingness of resignation, abdication of image benefits at the market and internal escape.

Companies generally seek to maintain and, if possible, increase the competitiveness of products and services and thus achieving better business results than before. Achieving this, requires in general suitable employees. Because the talent of employees is regarded as a factor in competitive differentiation in both good, but also in bad economic times, some companies need to think more creatively and strategically than before about how they can use Work-live-balance programs to their advantage.

== Work–life balance and demographic change in Germany ==
The topic of the WLB is in times of demographic change, especially topical, as the demographic changes lead to a drastic decline in the labor force potential. Unless there is a significant migration of workers, what can not be considered under the current immigration policy as likely, the number of employed persons will be reduced from currently about 42 million to 25 to 35 million. This means, that in the long term the already, partial existing deficit of qualified specialists and executives will increase dramatically, and increasingly fewer and fewer labor force is available. The need for well-qualified staff will continue to grow. Even if it is currently, with about 4.5 million unemployed people in Germany hardly to imagine, a shortage of skilled workers will already be most likely in the medium term.

In addition, the birth rate in Germany is for over three decades at a low level, so that the long-term population size can not be kept constant and thus a decline in population is almost inevitable. This leads to significant consequences in the social development. The population would shrink, depending on the model, in Germany in 2050 to about 67-75 million people. These demographic changes will also lead to drastic effects on the structure and scope of employment potential, because in general the labor supply will decrease in future, while the average age of workers increases considerable. The economically active population aged 15 to 64 years will decrease by these projections, relatively and absolutely, more numerical than the total population. It follows that the demographic development also leads to an aging of the total society.

Since not only the average age of the workforce is increasing, but at the same time barely enough young people move up, this demographic development will affect the labor market and the human resources policy in enterprises sustainable. The Institute for the Study of Labor (IZA) has calculated that the decline in the supply of specialists and executives in 2015 will already be noticeable and in 2025 led to a gap of about 350,000 persons. By the year 2050, this gap is expected to have increased to a value of almost one million, that is a quarter more than in 2006.

Due to the mass unemployment in the recent years it came to a de-skilling of human capital, in particular at the long-term unemployed. As a result, a lack of professional workers and executives is conceivable. It can be assumed that these developments in the future will continue. Especially the globalization with the opening of world markets and ever-accelerating technological innovations increasingly require qualified personnel, which means for most employers only a good investment if it can be obligate to the company in the long run. Therefore, it is extremely important for companies, being an attractive employer in order to hire the decreasing number of young specialists and executives and obligate them to the company.

== Combination work–life balance and family ==
In particular, young, highly skilled workers want to have more and more often a career without waiving for children. The high level of childlessness by female academics, for example, is in most cases not voluntarily, but mostly structural. When companies adapt to the new needs of the compatibility of family and work and thus are considered as "family friendly" company, it can be assumed that this acts as an incentive system to the qualified staff and that family-friendliness in companies is increasingly seen as a locational advantage.

In Germany it is the responsibility of the state and required by law to provide child care places. Unfortunately, the experiences of the past show that the family-policy benefits of the state are not enough to solve the problem of reconciling work and family satisfactorily. The unions have argued for a long time that company childcare facilities favor the private dependency of the employee to the employer. At this point, the initiative of the economy is required, to take a supporting role and particular responsibility. Only then can we succeed in enabling young people a work–life balance, which authorizes them to exercise both their profession, as well as the desire for a family, which most couples still have as a life goal.

As yet some female employees decide to have children, the following can be observed in the employment rate: while at the beginning of the working life the employment rate is still the same between men and women, the employment rate of women drops significantly in the family phase between 25–40 years. Many well-qualified mothers can not work, because of inadequate child care, or work only part-time. Here is considerable potential for employment of almost 3.3 million women who are not at all or are only (unwittingly) part-time employed.

70% of mothers who are at home would be better employed and one of three father wants to have more time for his family.^{p. 35-43} Hence the positions of women or men who are forced, by lack of childcare, to get out for some time from work, need to be filled, substantial costs occur here for the company. As part of the national competition "The family-friendly company 2000: New Opportunities for Women and Men" the CEO of a company announced that the amount of costs for filling a vacant position belongs to about 75% to 150% of the respectively annual salary. Would a cost-benefit analysis be prepared, whether the assistance in the field of child care would be worth as WLB measure, in this analysis the know-how loss necessarily should be included, which is connected to a long career break.

However, the complex of problems should not only be discussed in the reconciliation of family and work in terms of child care. In this case it is often thought of young people who have to combine their professional needs with the care and education of children, but the support of aid needed and high-maintenance people is included here only rarely. This ignores that 68% of the over two million care-needed people in Germany live in their own homes and were supported partly or entirely by family members and other members of the private network. Overall, about 92% of the high-maintenance and about 85% of the help needed people are usually cared by family members. From the changing age structure of society which is motivated by the demographic change, necessarily results an increase of people who need help and care services.

Because the support and maintenance of the old generation is often done by the middle generation, this means up to today a considerable relief for the society and its social systems and therefore for the economy. With that not only the financial contribution of the labor force for the maintenance of the no longer in working life standing, in the society so-called "generation contract", is meant. Most notably it deals with the work performance, which is applied individually within the families, to care for sick, help- and care-needed elderly people.

According to the Federal Ministry for Senior Citizens, Women and Youth, at least 45% of people who provide care services in their family have to reconcile this activity with the requirements of their employment, which can lead to a substantial limitation of the WLB. Since the task of maintenance today is still predominantly performed by women, their potential of skills and knowledge can not always benefit the economy, due to the family responsibilities.

Approximately 19% of all Germans are currently more than 65 years old. In 2050, almost one of three people will be older than 65. The age group of 0 - to 19-year-old now makes about 21% of the total population; in 2050 the share will be decreased to only 15%. Based on these figures this will lead for significantly more families than before, to higher, if not double compatibility difficulties. Especially the family members in the middle age, the so-called "sandwich generation", has to manage increasingly both, the task of education and care of the children, and support services related to the maintenance and care of older people.

== Motives of companies to integrate work–life balance measures ==
The demographic development is forcing every company to maintain and improve the employability of employees. Moreover, companies must acquire new qualified employees and keep the skills of employees up to date through lifelong learning. If companies support their employees in creating a WLB, the company can generate an economic benefit from it permanently. To this economic benefit counts in particular the reduction of stress levels of the employees, reducing absenteeism and sickness absence rate, the reduction of the fluctuation with the effects of human capital preservation, increasing employee loyalty and commitment to the company, increasing motivation and satisfaction of the workforce, increasing the return rate and reducing the period of absence after maternity and elderly care, reducing the effort needed to reoccupation, an improved recruitment marketing, performance improvement, marketing effects for product sales and an improved corporate image. Thus, companies can generate long-term competitive advantages, which is a major motive of WLB.

Another motive for a family-friendly and WLB integrated personnel policy is to increase the job satisfaction of employees in order to achieve a higher overall productivity. In addition, the personnel policy is seen as a competitive factor in attracting and retaining qualified staff. But also the cost savings through lower absenteeism and lower fluctuation are of course motives of companies to support the WLB of their employees.

== Benefits of companies which support work–life balance measures ==
Through the implementation of appropriate human resource management concepts, the permanent generation of economic benefits for the organization is reachable, which expresses itself for example through cost-saving potentials, such as reducing the effort needed for reoccupation, reducing absenteeism and sickness absence rate, by reducing the fluctuation with the effects of human capital maintenance and efficiency improvements or through marketing effects for the sale of products. Thus, the companies ensure their competitiveness and take social responsibility. Thereby short-term and long-term effects were shown, which lead to an overall generation of competitive advantages and support sustainable social changes.

== See also ==
- German labour law
- Public holidays in Germany
- UK labour law
