= Affairs Today =

Former online newspaper for students

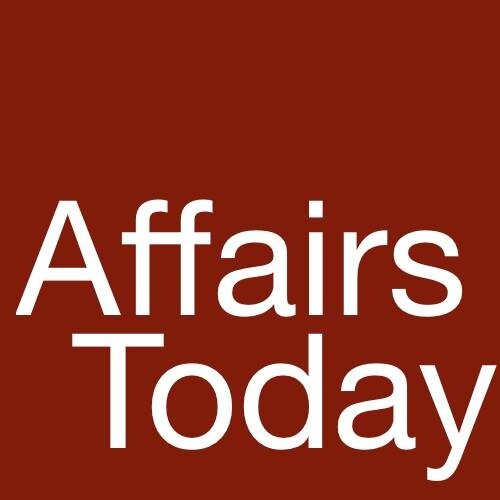
- Type: Online
- Founder: Alexandre Gianasso Maximilian Linhard Ferdinand Goetzen
- Editor: Robert Lewis Watson (last)
- Staff writers: 50 - 100
- Founded: 2013
- Political alignment: Independent
- Language: English
- Headquarters: Glasgow; United Kingdom
- Website: affairstoday.co.uk

Affairs Today was a global student-run online business and politics newspaper aimed at university students around the world. It mainly focused on international political developments and global economics although it also produced career, travel and lifestyle articles. Its principal audience was university students and was mostly read in the United Kingdom. Affairs Today had no particular political inclination as it attempted to be a platform where highly engaged students could voice their opinions regardless of their stance on the matters they wrote about. As such, a wide and diverse range of views could be found on Affairs Today. The thought behind this unusual editorial guideline was that readers would be challenged by the views of their peers and as a result engage with and learn from the articles published on Affairs Today. In terms of style, Affairs Today sought to emulate the journalistic standards of long-established publications such as the Financial Times and The Economist.

Affairs Today was operated by more than 100 staffers based in over 15 different countries around the world. Every member of the staff had to be a university student. As the founders moved on from their studies to their respective careers, they decided to close Affairs Today in March 2017. A part of the editorial staff went on to found a news outlet of their own known as Pynx Media, which was discontinued in 2018.

== History ==
Affairs Today was started in February 2013 by University of Glasgow students Alexandre Gianasso and Maximilian Linhard. However, it is only in November of that year that Affairs Today was formally incorporated. At the date of incorporation, Ferdinand Goetzen had joined the founding team in his capacity of Editor-in-Chief. Affairs Today originally started as a blog operated from a student hall and was chiefly set up as a rival to The Gateway, a newspaper sometimes referred to as the "Student FT". It is during a visit to the University of Edinburgh that Alexandre Gianasso and Maximilan Linhard read a Gateway newspaper for the first time, whereupon they decided that the same could be achieved by students themselves. At the time, most writers for the Gateway were professional journalists. After a difficult first few months of low readership, Affairs Today experienced rapid growth in late 2013 as the original team was expanded and as high-profile interviews added to the credibility of the website, notably Ferdinand Goetzen's interview with King Simeon II of Bulgaria. The website thereon moved on from its original aim and sought to establish itself as its own brand of 'global student business news'. From that point on, Affairs Today managed to feature more successful interviews with prominent business and political leaders, which further contributed to its expansion. At its peak in 2016, Affairs Today had over 35,000 visitors per month.

== Notable Interviews ==
Affairs Today conducted interviews with important personalities drawn from the business and political world. Here is a non-exhaustive list of the personalities Affairs Today interviewed since 2013

- Tsar Simeon II of Bulgaria
- Didier Reynders, Belgium's Minister of Foreign Affairs and Vice Prime Minister
- Cecilia Malmström, EU Commissioner for Trade
- John Sculley, former PepsiCo President and Apple CEO
- Lord Robertson, former NATO Secretary-General
- Jaan Tallinn, Co-Founder of Skype
- Brian McBride, Chairman of ASOS.com
- Kevin Sneader, McKinsey & Company Asia Chairman
- Ahmet Üzümcü, OPCW Director-General and Nobel Prize winner
- Nigel Eccles, Co-Founder and CEO of FanDuel
- Robin Marshall, Managing Director at Bain Capital
