= Durham21 =

Defunct student newspaper for Durham University

- Website type: Student News and Opinion
- Available in: English
- Dissolved: 14 July 2011
- Owner: Independent
- Creators: Tom Rowson, Leon Chevalier, Jonty Rodgers, Matt Perkins
- Editors: Alex Dudas, Matt Killeya, Iain Thomas, Barney Britton, Roger Jeffery, Richard Benstead, Narayani Menon, Rob Bownes, Darren Starling, Stevie Martin
- Revenue: All proceeds go to local charities
- Website: http://www.durham21.co.uk
- Launched: 2000

Durham21.co.uk, or d21 for short, is a defunct independent online newspaper and lifestyle magazine for students from Durham University.

Averaging over 38,000 pageviews per month, durham21 won the Student Website of the Year at the NUS National Student Journalism Awards in 2001, 2002, 2003 and 2005, despite only being founded in 2000.

Completely independent and financed entirely by its own fundraising and advertising (with any proceeds going to local charities), d21 is led by a team of editors who manage and contribute to their own sections of the website while encouraging contributions from any student in Durham. Indeed, it has recently opened the door for people outside of the University of Durham to contribute as it aims to diversify the scope of opinion it carries.

The aim of d21 is to combine all the recognisable features of a print newspaper, such as the latest news, views, music, arts and reviews, whilst also exploiting the internet medium to bring such things as a virtual tour of Durham, webcasting of Durham's student radio station Purple, a fully searchable listings system, web polls and an interactive comments system. Durham21 is entirely run by students. Durham21 was relaunched in March 2009 after being taken over by a new editorial team.

Durham21 did not recruit a new editorial team for 2012 and the website has not been updated since 2011.

== Accolades ==
In 2003 the site was labelled by judges "the complete package" and has since been praised for its "clear and consistent navigation, enjoyable and timely features." Donald Macintyre, chief political commentator from The Independent remarked that d21 "explored the unique possibilities of the web, rather than simply 'hosting' their union's newspaper or magazine." When d21's Laura Swinton won the best Student Critic Award in 2006, the judge commented that she "displayed a fluent, confident and witty style that made her work really stand out."
