= Recruitment marketing =

Recruitment marketing refers to the inbound strategies and tactics an organization uses to find, attract, engage, and nurture talent before they apply for a job, also called the pre-applicant phase of talent acquisition. It is the practice of promoting the benefits and value of working for an employer in order to recruit talent. It is analogous in many ways to corporate marketing, and is extremely similar to employer branding except recruitment marketing relates to trackable initiatives that drive awareness, engagement and conversion of applicants versus someone's impression of working at a company. Of course others see employer branding as a subset of recruitment marketing, in addition to extending the reach and exposure of career opportunities through search engine optimization (SEO), building and nurturing candidate relationships through talent communities, and the management of messaging and advertising of talent acquisition efforts.

== Process ==
The focus of recruitment marketing involves ongoing efforts to reach and engage potential candidates to initiate relationships to meet current and future talent needs by utilizing the many touch points of the modern job search. The goal of a recruitment marketing strategy is to increase the number of qualified candidates in an organization's talent pipeline. Recruitment marketing may consist of a collection of tools and processes that meet the needs of a given employer's recruiting goals. The first step in recruitment marketing is an optimized corporate career site to ensure potential candidates can find employers jobs in search engine results. To manage applicants and the hiring process employers typically use a modern ATS (iCIMS, Lever, Workable, GreenHouse, etc.). A dedicated recruitment marketing platform is used to handle anything from social media to ad buying (Nexcv, or traditional demand side platforms or marketing agencies).

Bersin by Deloitte defines a talent pipeline as an organization's ongoing need to have a pool of talent that is readily available to fill positions at all levels of management (as well as other key positions) as the company grows. In contrast, traditional recruitment is focused on the immediate need of filling a specific job requisition.

A recruitment marketing strategy leverages the principles of inbound marketing by integrating an employer's value proposition as part of their employer brand, career site optimization, job distribution, and online advertising (job boards and job aggregators like Indeed, Resume-Library SimplyHired, CareerBuilder, Monster, LinkedIn and more). Search Engine Optimization SEO builds an employers' organic candidate visitor traffic, mobile recruiting, landing pages, content marketing, career site design, social media marketing, employee referrals, and email marketing engage potential candidates to convert them to active members of an employer's CRM or talent network. Once in the CRM (candidate relationship management), the focus is building relationships and nurturing candidates through personalized content, alerts and calls-to-action, including relevant job openings.

Optimizing corporate career sites and open job opportunities to perform well in search engines, social media and mobile devices enables employers to reach and attract candidates directly rather than relying solely on third party sources (job boards, paid advertising). Tracking, measuring and analyzing the effectiveness of candidate sourcing and recruiting efforts gives employers the control and insight to maximize their talent acquisition strategy. Recruitment marketing has become an effective, data-driven function that consistently and predictably drives more qualified applicants to employers' career sites and applicant tracking systems. Using integrated recruiting tools, performance metrics, business intelligence and predictive analytics, companies can now report on the entire recruitment and hiring process from applicant source to hire, including the effectiveness of their recruitment marketing efforts, ROI and the value of their talent pipeline and audience.

=== Evolution of recruiting ===
Business in all facets has largely turned "inbound" in the last decade—customers are finding their own paths to services, products and companies versus companies using ads to disruptively get in front of potential customers. Inbound marketing has been the most successful marketing method for doing business in recent years because companies are creating value and interest for prospective customers, turning them into loyal and long-term advocates. HubSpot notes that inbound marketers who measure ROI are more than 12 times more likely to be generating a greater year-over-year return.

Marketing teams have thus transformed and expanded, adding new positions like content strategist and digital analyst, and expertise in social media, SEO and demand generation. The modern marketing team has key roles with specific knowledge in efforts that will attract more interested leads through broader channels, and more importantly, will nurture them into qualified prospects to deliver to sales.

To create differentiation and improve candidate engagement, recruiting is using marketing tactics with similar functions and strategies. While there has always been an element of marketing in a good recruiting process, historically it has never been the core, and departments have been siloed between marketing and HR. Now, however, the talent acquisition industry is seeing marketing and recruiting becoming intertwined, with recruitment marketing emerging both as a distinct discipline and a core competency affecting every part of the talent acquisition cycle. Increasingly, recruitment marketing is becoming not only a practice but also a profession, with new job titles such as recruitment marketing specialist, social recruiting strategist and talent brand manager.

== Where the value comes from ==
Typically recruitment marketing drives value in two major ways. First is through driving awareness. This can be through traditional job advertisements, that are more broadly distributed through paid placement on websites like Indeed. This can also be done through advertising strategies that are both paid and organic, but more natural to the world of marketing such as social media advertising, SEO focused content, and even webinars. More awareness leads to more candidates and further growth of a given company's talent pipeline.

The second main source of value is from increasing the rate at which job seekers apply for jobs, or conversion rates. For example, if 5% of your career site visitors currently apply for a job, and you increase that number to 10% by having more compelling content on your careers site, then your recruitment marketing efforts have resulted in double the amount of applicants you would have otherwise gotten.

The end results of these efforts should always be a decrease in time to fill, as well as cost per hire.
