= The Falmouth Anchor =

Falmouth University student newspaper

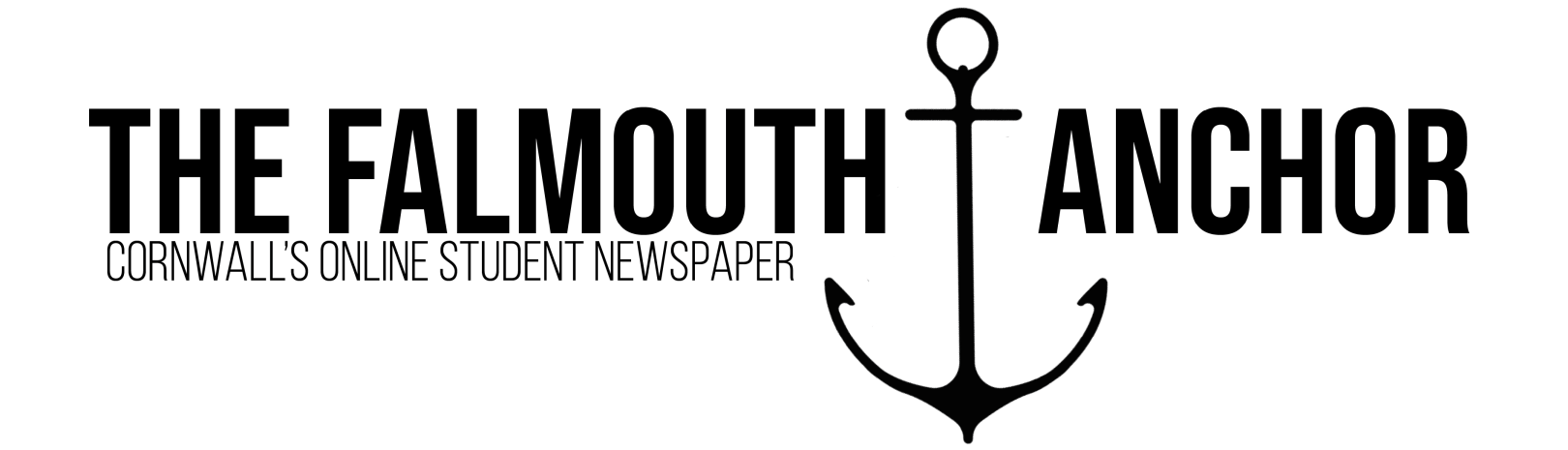
- Type: Online newspaper
- Owner(s): Falmouth & Exeter Students' Union
- Founder(s): Cecelia Armstrong and Hermione Blomfield-Smith
- Editor: Joseph Taylor
- Deputy editor: Kirsty Heffernan
- Founded: 2015
- Language: English
- Headquarters: Penryn Campus, Penryn, Cornwall, United Kingdom, TR10 9FE
- Website: www.surfradio.co.uk/anchor-news

The Falmouth Anchor is the online student newspaper of Falmouth University and the University of Exeter's Cornwall campuses.

Founded in 2015, the paper produces local news coverage catering to both universities. Run by a team of student volunteers, the Anchor—as it is also known—provides opportunities for students to contribute to its various sections, including news, opinions, politics, arts, lifestyle, fashion, and sport. Since its inception, The Falmouth Anchor has been affiliated with the Falmouth & Exeter Students' Union as a society open to all Cornwall-based students.

== History ==
The Falmouth Anchor was formed in early 2015 by Cecelia Armstrong and Hermione Blomfield-Smith with the aim to bring a student publication to universities in Cornwall. It launched as a free monthly print newspaper with the first edition releasing in June 2015 and featuring an interview with Falmouth University Chancellor Dawn French. The paper continued in this format for a further ten issues until September 2017, when financial difficulties—owing to the withdrawal of production grants from the University of Exeter—forced the Anchor to end its regular print production. Since the beginning of the 2017/18 academic year, the publication has operated in an online-only capacity.

=== Notable stories and wider coverage ===
In June 2018, 2018/19 Editor-in-Chief Annissa Warsame and News Editor Ivan Edwards broke a story highlighting an email sent by the University of Exeter's careers service which accidentally featured a quote from Erwin Rommel, a German general associated with the Nazi Party. The article was picked up by several national news outlets. The Anchor's coverage also hit international channels with USA Today, Fox News, and Breitbart News all reporting on the mishap. The story's widespread reach resulted in The Falmouth Anchor receiving the "Best Impact" award at the 2018 Student Publication Association Regional Conference (South West) in November 2018. This recognition continued at the National Conference (SPANC) in April of the next year with Warsame and Edwards' article being shortlisted for "Best News Story".

The following year, the paper garnered further national attention with its coverage of the 2019 European Parliament election in the South West England constituency. At a campaign rally in Truro in May 2019, controversial YouTuber and the UK Independence Party (UKIP)'s candidate, Carl Benjamin, was struck by a dead fish thrown by a protester during an interview with then-Politics Editor Jacob Jaffa. The moment of impact was captured on camera by 2019/20 Editor-in-Chief Alex Welsford with the image leading The Falmouth Anchor's report of the incident. The photo, in combination with the article's headline "'Super callous fragile racist sexist UKIP a***hole': Carl Benjamin visits Truro", saw the news quickly picked up by Metro and The Falmouth Packet, which made note of The Falmouth Anchor's website repeatedly crashing due to the number of times the report was being shared. The full video interview with Benjamin was uploaded to his YouTube channel "Sargon of Akkad" where it amassed over 270,000 views as of November 2019. On 26 May Labour Party MP Jess Phillips—who was previously subjected to online abuse from Benjamin, saying he "wouldn't even rape her"—quoted a tweet that used the Anchor's photo to announce Benjamin's failure to be elected into the European Parliament. The coverage led to further accolades for The Falmouth Anchor; "Highly Commended" in the "Best Impact" category at SPARC South West in November 2019, and a "Best News Story" nomination for Jaffa at SPANC20 in October 2020.

=== Merger with Surf Radio ===
In November 2023, for financial reasons, the Falmouth Anchor merged with fellow media society, Surf Radio. The merger has seen the creation of the Falmouth Anchor radio show as well as new articles being published on the Surf website.

== Awards and nominations ==
=== Student Publication Association National Conference (SPANC) Awards ===
- 2018 – Best Entertainment Piece – "Your average night out in Falmouth" by Carl Altaner (Won)
- 2018 – Best Newcomer Publication (Shortlisted)
- 2019 – Best Human Rights Story – "Living as a Refugee in Cornwall" by Annissa Warsame (Special Mention)
- 2019 – Billy Dowling-Reid Award for Outstanding Commitment – Annissa Warsame (Shortlisted)
- 2019 – Best News Story – "Exeter Career Zone accidentally quote Nazi General in e-mail blast" by Annissa Warsame & Ivan Edwards (Shortlisted)
- 2019 – Best Reporter – Ivan Edwards (Shortlisted)
- 2019 – Best Entertainment Piece – "Confessions of the vegan students" by Melissa Watt (Shortlisted)
- 2020 – Best News Story – "'Super callous fragile racist sexist UKIP a***hole': Carl Benjamin visits Truro" by Jacob Jaffa (Shortlisted)
- 2022 – Best Sports Reporter – Miriam Leyshon (Shortlisted)
- 2022 – Best Sports Section (Shortlisted)

=== Student Publication Association Regional Conference (SPARC) Awards (South West) ===
- 2018 – Best Development (Won)
- 2018 – Best Impact (Won)
- 2019 – Best Development (Won)
- 2019 – Best Impact (Highly Commended)

=== National Societies Awards ===
- 2018 – Best Media Society (Shortlisted)
