= The Gateway (student newspaper) =

British career and business online newspaper

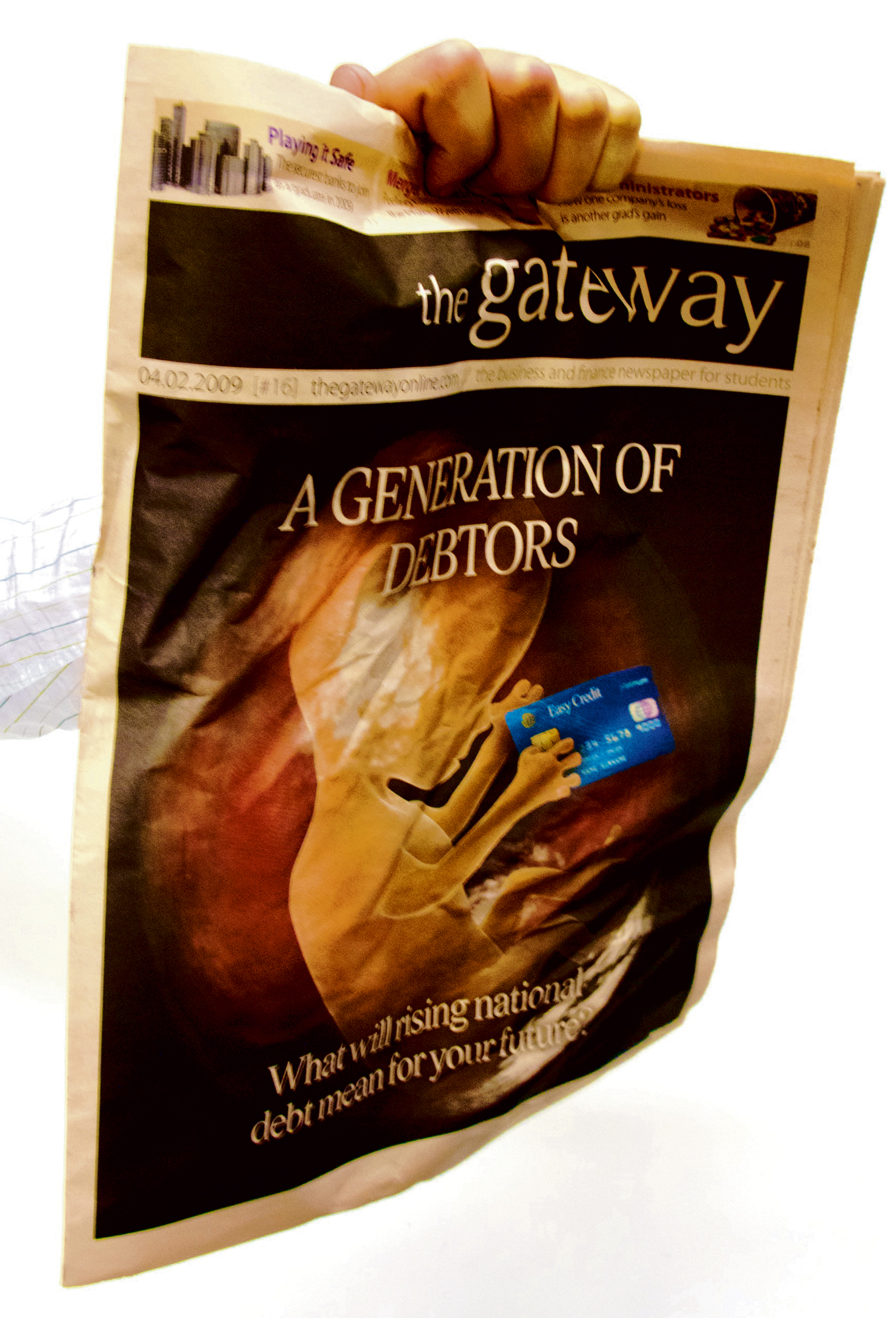
- A typical front page of The Gateway
- Type: Online (formerly print) newspaper during UK university term time
- Format: Tabloid
- Owner: Career Gateways Limited
- Founded: 2007
- Political alignment: Economic liberalism
- Language: English
- Headquarters: London; United Kingdom
- Circulation: c 30,000 and 60,000+ website hits monthly
- Price: Free
- Website: The Gateway

The Gateway newspaper was a business and careers online newspaper, formerly print and digital and then exclusively digital, read by students and graduates. It was popular with students at a range of UK universities and had readers around the world. The Gateway produced analysis, career advice and employer insights, as well as profiling paid internship opportunities and graduate jobs.

First published at Oxford University in October 2007, The Gateway was often dubbed "the student FT" due to being printed on the same light salmon paper as the Financial Times. Published by Career Gateways Limited, The Gateway specialised in making the world of business and finance accessible to students pursuing a career in the city.

== History ==
The Gateway was conceived by three Oxford University students, Mawuli Ladzekpo (Exeter College), Max Lewis (Pembroke College) and Chris Wilkinson (Lincoln College) in the summer of 2007. The trio aimed to fill the apparent niche for a publication that combined business and financial news with independent careers advice, and sought to take advantage of the growing graduate recruitment marketing industry that centered around Oxbridge. The first issue of The Gateway was released on 8 October 2007 with a circulation of 6,000 at Oxford University.

In November 2007, The Gateway received commercial backing when the London based boutique recruitment consultancy, OxbridgeGroup, bought a stake in Career Gateways Limited. This injection of capital allowed for an increased distribution of The Gateway to include an additional fourteen universities in the United Kingdom. It also resulted in The Gateway shedding its student workforce recruited by its founders, to be replaced with a team of full-time staff based at The Gateway's headquarters in the London Docklands. The company remained managed, in part, by its student founders.

The Gateway Online newspaper and website were shut down in around 2018/19.

Readership of The Gateway at target universities
Year	Readership as a proportion of final year students
2010	6%
2011	10%
2012	16%
2013	18%

== Distribution universities ==
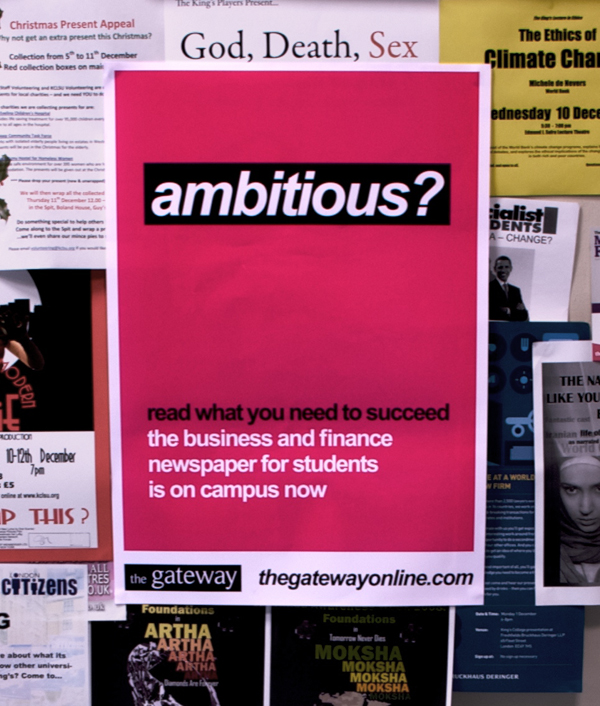
Poster for The Gateway newspaper seen at King's College London in 2008.

The Gateway worked closely in particular with the following fifteen top universities in the United Kingdom, based loosely on the Russell Group.

- Cambridge University
- Imperial College London
- King's College London
- London School of Economics (LSE)
- Oxford University
- University College London
- University of Bath
- University of Bristol
- University of Edinburgh
- University of Exeter
- University of Durham
- University of Manchester
- University of Nottingham
- University of St Andrews
- University of Warwick
