= Palestine Expo =

- Venue: Olympia Kensington
- Location: London
- Country: United Kingdom
- Organized by: Friends of Al-Aqsa, and others
- Website: www.palestineexpo.com

Palestine Expo is an exhibition about Palestinian culture, food, art and entertainment organised by the UK-based NGO Friends of Al-Aqsa (FOA). This year, 2019, it will be held in Olympia, London, UK on the 6th and 7th of July, 2019. The organiser claim it to be bigger and better than the first one. The event was first held in July, 2017 and was spread over five stories in the Queen Elizabeth II Conference Centre, and expected to draw around 10,000 visitors. The event includes art galleries, comedy acts, augmented reality tours of Palestinian landmarks, discussion panels, and talks from people such as John Pilger, Miko Peled and Ilan Pappe. It is organised by Friends of Al-Aqsa, a non-profit based in the UK.

In the weeks leading up to the exhibition, there were concerns about a possible ban on the event. Lawyers of Jewish Human Rights Watch, an Israeli lobby group, issued a letter accusing the organisers of supporting "Jew hate". The British government sent the organisers a letter raising concern about possible connections to radical groups, and threatened to ban the event if the organisers did not reply in time. Ismael Adam Patel, chairman of FOA called efforts to ban the event a "deliberate smear campaign". On June, 27th, two weeks before the event, a spokesman for the British government said the event may proceed.
