= Talent community =

Group of potential employees

A talent community is a mechanism that employers use to keep active pipelines of talent for future recruitment. Talent pipelines consist of potential employees who are interested in working at a given employer, but are not ready to apply. This group is engaged with on a frequent basis so that when the potential employees are ready to seek a new job, they have a relationship with the company.

== Job seeker's perspective ==
A job seeker may join an employer's talent community, if after learning more about the company, they have interest but they are not yet ready to apply for a position via the employer's corporate career site. Talent communities, typically part of an employer's career site, are reached directly from various sources, including social media, search engine result pages (SERPS), and job boards that forward potential candidates to employers' career sites to apply for jobs. For example, Mary hears about Acme Corp from recent PR surrounding Acme's latest product enhancement. She goes to the company's career website, and perhaps looks at a microsite related to the job family she is interested in. After reading about working at the company, Mary is intrigued. However, she does not have a resume since she has worked happily at the same company for the past five years. So, she simply leaves her name and email in Acme's talent community. She will now receive updates from the company that are relevant to her – such as, interview tips, career paths of similar professionals, and information on events that Acme is holding.

Such content is intended to increase brand awareness among potential candidates and may influence future application decisions.

== Relating talent communities to sales and marketing ==
Talent communities are sometimes used as a form of recruitment marketing. Let us say a consumer goes to a website to make a purchasing decision, like buying a new car. They read about the new sedan being offered by a car company and are very interested in purchasing it. However, something is stopping them from buying it today. Maybe their lease is not up for another six months, or they will not have the proper funds until they get a new job. So, they sign up for the company's email list to get updates on the car. In six months when they are ready to make a purchasing decision; this car is top of mind after having received updates for months prior via the car company's email list. This email list is very analogous to the employer's talent community which is keeping passive job seekers in the loop until they are ready to make their own "purchasing decision" and apply for a job.

== Job seeker interactions through talent communities ==
Job seekers can expect to get insights into the culture of a given company through the talent community. The most common delivery mechanism is email. Companies can also use text messages, online and offline events, and phone conversations to engage candidates.

== Execution of talent communities ==
Talent communities can be executed in a variety of ways depending on a company's size and goals.

For the smallest of companies, a simple spreadsheet of interested candidates gathered by a simple sign-up form may be all that is needed. For larger companies, it makes sense to have a dedicated software vendor focused on talent communities.

Companies with internal engineering resources can also get creative by constructing their own solutions by using APIs like Twilio and SendGrid, as well as existing off-the-shelf marketing technologies like Marketo.

The best talent communities have an automated passive strategy to nurture candidates, such as email campaigns. They also have a more active strategy for engaging the most relevant candidates, such as recruiters actively sourcing within these pools.

== Return on investment ==
The value for employers is in decreasing their time to fill and cost per hire. This can be accomplished through effective job distribution to social media, free job boards, and search engines via search engine optimization (SEO) which generates organic career site visitors that may become talent community members. For many reasons, not all visitors apply for jobs via the employer's ATS, the talent community gives visitors an alternative to a formal application and an opportunity for the employer to build a relationship with potential candidates. The talent community gives HR teams access to applicants that have researched their company and are thinking long term about their careers, which may infer a higher quality candidate. Moreover, having a warm pipeline of talent means that corporate recruiters don't have to spend time reaching out cold through various resume databases, networking sites like LinkedIn or hoping the right person will apply through a job posting. The talent community becomes an active, opt-in database of relevant job seekers that HR can contact directly which shortens their time to hire when filling a new job.

The benefits have been similarly stated as: qualified candidates at a recruiter's fingertips; less dependence on ineffective job boards (also known as employment websites); less money spent on job advertisements; increased interaction with potential candidates; better quality of applicants to job openings; creation of a talent pipeline for future job openings; and, attraction of passive candidates.

== Talent pool vs. CRM vs. talent pipeline vs. talent community ==
While there are differences across these various terms, in reality they are used mostly interchangeably within the HR and talent acquisition communities.

A talent pool is a database of everyone that has ever applied to a recruiter's jobs, regardless of relevance. It is typically a one-way communication, whereas a talent community will have more two-way communication between recruiters/employers and talent – both active and passive job seekers.

A candidate relationship management (CRM) is similar to a sales team's customer relationship management software. However, while sales tools like Salesforce have been around for decades, CRMs for talent management are relatively new for corporate HR teams. This translates to less functionality relative to the analogous sales software. There is also much lower usage of these tools because they are so new. The vast majority of HR teams are not used to using a CRM, and so many of these systems go unused at companies that have them. Instead, internal recruiting teams are using existing tools like applicant tracking systems (ATS) and LinkedIn to manage their relationships with candidates.

The idea of a talent pipeline is an abstract notion of having warm relationships with relevant groups of potential applicants. These pipelines can be managed via a talent community, CRM, or even a spreadsheet in very simple cases.

== Common pitfalls of talent communities ==
Many employers mis-step in their execution of talent communities. First, the majority of companies never engage with their talent community members given the lack of marketing DNA within the HR function. It becomes overwhelming for most companies to write relevant emails to each segment within their talent community on a regular (weekly or monthly) basis. Second, many companies will send job openings to their talent communities. However, the members of these communities have explicitly decided to sign up for the talent community in lieu of applying for a job and are much more interested in information regarding company culture or professional development. Last, companies do not proactively engage with the most relevant people who may be a good fit for an open role and are much more prone to take a passive strategy.
