= Ahmed J. Versi =

Ahmed Jafferali Versi (known as Ahmed Versi) is a British editor, publisher, journalist and pharmacist. He is the founder and editor of The Muslim News. His writing has been published by The Guardian and The Independent.

== Career and achievements ==
Versi is passionate about female empowerment and Muslim women's involvement in sports, establishing the British Muslim Women's Sport Foundation, as well as having previously served as the Vice President of the International Islamic Women's Games.

He was awarded an Honorary Doctorate of Arts by the University of Bedfordshire in 2007, in recognition of his achievements as the editor of The Muslim News.

He launched the Muslim News Awards for Excellence, an annual awards ceremony celebrating Muslim achievement in the UK in 2000, which he describes as one of his proudest career achievements.

== Personal life ==
Versi studied pharmacy at Portsmouth Polytechnic. He lives in Harrow, London with his wife Tahera.

== Views ==
=== Muslims and the media ===
In 2002, an article written by Versi in The Guardian highlighted the importance of diversity in media, encouraging increased representation of Muslims and efforts to change the 'Islamophobic culture' present in some media outlets.

Following the September 11 attacks, he pointed out that "because of their own experiences, British Muslims don't believe the mainstream media," in relation to claims made by the British government at the time on their intelligence following the events of 9/11. In a 2006 academic paper, he further stated that "Government intelligence leaks certain information out in order to build up credibility for them to then do as they please. For example, the demonisation of Saddam Hussein prior to the attack on Iraq."

In a 2011 interview with El Mundo, Versi has highlighted what he views as the double standard of how Muslim terrorists and far-right extremist terrorists are treated and portrayed in the media. He said "The language towards Muslims in Europe is very negative. When a Muslim commits a crime, he’s a terrorist or a radical islamist. When it’s a European Non muslim, they refer to an unstable person or a madman."

=== Racism and Islamophobia ===
In 2017 during an interview on Talk Radio with Julia Hartley-Brewer, Versi stated that he believed that most people in British society were not racist, prejudiced or Islamophobic. Instead, he explained that any supposed prejudice that exists is due to 'perceptions of Muslims, rather than the reality,' and that "the more we integrate, and come to know one another, the less prejudice and racism there will be." He also stated that "racism is not unique to the white communities, it is there in all societies," and that "there will always be some kind of racism in society."

He has also pointed out Islam's rejection of racism, saying "Islam is colour-blind. All are considered as part of a common humanity."
