= The Muslim News =

Monthly and digital newspaper

The Muslim News is a monthly and digital newspaper. Established by Ahmed J. Versi in February 1989, it has grown to become the largest monthly ethnic paper in the UK. It describes itself as, "The only independent monthly Muslim newspaper in the UK, that is not backed by any country, organisation or party."

The newspaper offers a platform for Muslims "to lobby and campaign" on a range of issues. 140,000 copies are distributed, many for free in mosques. Its website received 1.5 million hits a month.

The current editor of The Muslim News is Ahmed Versi, who volunteers full-time to run the paper. Versi is an established lobby journalist of three years.

== The Muslim News Awards ==
The Muslim News established these awards in 2000 with the aim of recognising the achievements of Muslims in the UK, which often go under the radar.

In 2014, the Awards celebrated its 12th anniversary, and in a letter to The Muslim News, Prime Minister David Cameron, who was also an attendee said: "Now in its 12th year these prestigious awards showcase the incredible talent in our vibrant Muslim community."

The awards have also previously been attended by King Charles as well as British politicians, including former Prime Minister Tony Blair and Prime Minister, Rt Hon. Theresa May.

== Awards and nominations ==
In January 2015, The Muslim News was nominated for the Responsible Media of the Year award at the British Muslim Awards.
