= Windermere House =

Windermere House may refer to:

- Windermere House, Lancaster, a listed building in the city of Lancaster and the county of Lancashire, England
- Windermere House, New South Wales, a historical house in New South Wales, Australia
- Windermere House, Ontario, a historic hotel and resort in the Muskoka region of the province of Ontario, Canada

== See also ==
- Windermere Hotel (disambiguation)
- Windermere (disambiguation)
