= Storrs, Cumbria =

Coordinates: 54.3388°N 2.9321°W

Storrs
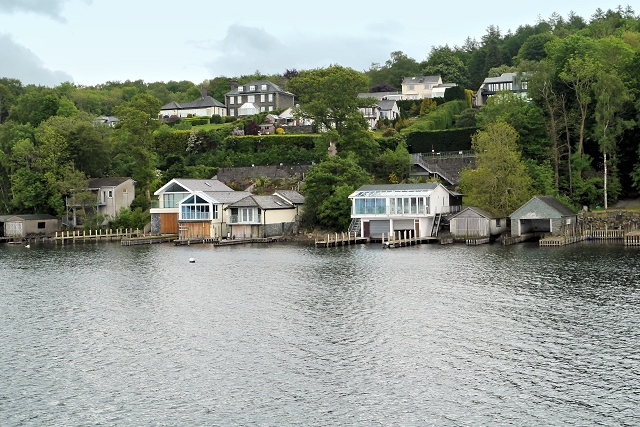
- Boathouses at Storrs

- Location in South Lakeland Location within Cumbria
- OS grid reference: SD394940
- Civil parish: Windermere and Bowness
- Unitary authority: Westmorland and Furness
- Ceremonial county: Cumbria
- Region: North West
- Country: England
- Sovereign state: United Kingdom
- Post town: WINDERMERE
- Postcode district: LA23
- Dialling code: 015394
- Police: Cumbria
- Fire: Cumbria
- Ambulance: North West
- UK Parliament: Westmorland and Lonsdale

Storrs is a hamlet in the civil parish of Windermere and Bowness, in the Westmorland and Furness district of the ceremonial county of Cumbria, England. It lies 2 miles (3.2 km) south of Bowness-on-Windermere, on the A592 road, close to the east shore of the lake, Windermere.

Historically a part of Westmorland, the most notable landmark is the Grade II* listed Georgian mansion and folly at Storrs Hall.

== See also ==
- Listed buildings in Windermere, Cumbria (town)
