= Windermere (disambiguation) =

Windermere is the largest natural lake in England near a town of the same name. It is also a name used in a number of places, including:

== Australia ==
- Electoral division of Windermere, Tasmania
- Electoral district of Windermere, former Victorian electorate
- Windermere, New South Wales
- Windermere, Queensland, a locality in the Bundaberg Region
- Windermere, Ascot, a heritage-listed villa in Brisbane, Queensland
- Windermere, Tasmania, a locality in the City of Launceston, Tasmania
- Windermere, Jervis Bay Territory, largest lake in Jervis Bay Territory
- Windermere, Victoria, Australian town

== The Bahamas ==
- Windermere Island, a small island connected to Eleuthera in The Bahamas

== Canada ==
- Windermere, British Columbia
- Windermere Lake (British Columbia), a lake in southeast British Columbia
- Windermere Lake (Ontario), a lake in Ontario
- Windermere, Ontario
- Windermere, Edmonton (area), a residential area in Edmonton, Alberta
  - Windermere, Edmonton, a neighbourhood within this area
- Windermere group, a group of Proterozoic sedimentary rocks in British Columbia

== New Zealand ==
- Windermere, New Zealand, locality near Hinds

== United Kingdom ==
- Windermere, Cumbria, the largest lake in England
- Windermere, Cumbria (town), a town near the lake
  - Windermere railway station, in the town of Windermere
  - Windermere and Bowness, a civil parish formerly called just "Windermere"
- Windermere Supergroup, the geological formations of the Windermere region of the English Lake District
- The Windermere, South Kenton, a pub in London

== United States ==
Settlements

- Windermere, Florida
- Windermere (Moultonborough, New Hampshire)
- Windermere, a subdivision that is a part of Morningside Place, Houston, Texas
- Windermere, Seattle, Washington

Lakes

- Lake Windermere (Illinois), reservoir, Coles County, Illinois, United States
- Lake Windermere (North Carolina), reservoir, Mecklenburg County, North Carolina, United States
- Lake Windermere (Tennessee), reservoir, Shelby County, Tennessee, United States

== Other uses ==
- Elsie Perrin Williams Estate, previously known as Windermere, an estate in London, Ontario, Canada
- Lady Windermere's Fan, a play by Oscar Wilde
- Windermere Real Estate, an American real estate company
- SOV Windermere, a subsea operations vessel built in 2010
- Windermere (submarine), a tourist submarine that briefly operated on the Cumbrian lake
