= Troutbeck Bridge =

Village in Cumbria, England

Coordinates: 54.3938°N 2.9194°W

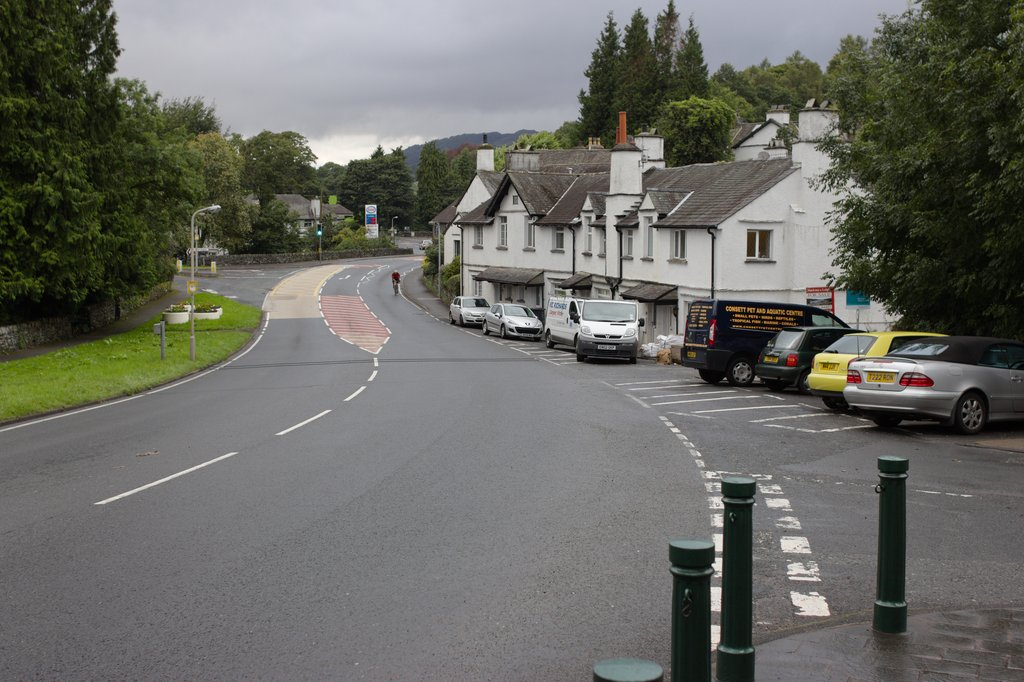
- The A591 road through Troutbeck Bridge

- Location in South Lakeland Location within Cumbria
- OS grid reference: NY404002
- Civil parish: Windermere and Bowness
- Unitary authority: Westmorland and Furness
- Ceremonial county: Cumbria
- Region: North West
- Country: England
- Sovereign state: United Kingdom
- Post town: WINDERMERE
- Postcode district: LA23
- Dialling code: 015394
- Police: Cumbria
- Fire: Cumbria
- Ambulance: North West
- UK Parliament: Westmorland and Lonsdale

Troutbeck Bridge is a village in the civil parish of Windermere and Bowness, in the Westmorland and Furness district, in the ceremonial county of Cumbria, England. It is situated 1 mile (1.5 kilometres) north of Windermere on the A591 road running through the Lake District and was historically in the county of Westmorland. The main secondary school for Windermere and Ambleside, The Lakes School, is located in the village, as is the postal sorting office for the area. Troutbeck Bridge takes its name from where the road crosses the Trout Beck.

The community is served by a petrol station and convenience store, an inn and restaurant, a secondary school and a gym.

== History ==
The Calgarth Estate was a wartime housing estate built to house the workers of the nearby flying boat factory at White Cross Bay. A temporary Short Brothers factory was established at White Cross Bay to produce Short Sunderlands.

By the end of the Second World War the workers had returned to their homes throughout Britain and in 1945 three hundred child survivors of the Holocaust, later known as the Windermere Boys, arrived from Eastern Europe to the Calgarth Estate to begin new lives: a film of their experience titled The Windermere Children was released in 2020. The site is now occupied by The Lakes School.

== Transport ==
The A591 road passes through Troutbeck Bridge, with Windermere to the south and Ambleside to the north. The nearest railway station is Windermere, 1 1/2 miles (2.5 kilometres) away, which is well connected to the village by local bus services.

== See also ==
- Listed buildings in Windermere, Cumbria (town)
- Route to Paradise
