= Windermere Hotel =

Windermere Hotel may refer to:

- Hotel Windermere (Chicago)
- Windermere Hotel (Lake District), a hotel in Windermere, Cumbria, England
- Windermere House, Ontario, a hotel in the Muskoka region of the province of Ontario, Canada
