= Windamere =

Windamere may refer to:

- Windamere Hotel, Darjeeling, India
- Windamere Dam, New South Wales, Australia

== See also ==
- Windemere (disambiguation)
- Windermere (disambiguation)
