= Windemere =

Windemere may refer to:

- Windemere Township, Minnesota
- Windemere, North Carolina, a census designated place (CDP)
- Windemere, Texas, a CDP
- Windemere (Walloon Lake), the Hemingway home on Walloon Lake in northern Michigan, listed on the National Register of Historic Places

== See also ==
- Windermere (disambiguation)
- Windamere (disambiguation)
