= Rachael Matthews =

Rachael Matthews is a textile artist, designer, and writer based in London, UK. She uses her art to explore themes of mindfulness through crafting and to explore the impact of fast fashion and fabric life on the environment through her artworks made from recycled textiles.

== Early life ==
Rachael grew up in the Lake District and attended The Lakes School, Windermere and St Anne's School, Windermere. She is descended from the South Lakes Patterson family of builders.

== Career ==
Rachael lectures in Textiles at Central St. Martins college in London and is also a teacher at the Victoria and Albert Museum. She co-ran a shop and studio named Prick Your Finger until 2016. She is also joint leader (with Sonia Tuttiett and Ceila Ward) of East London Textile Arts. She is a member of the Art Workers' Guild

== Publications ==
- Rag Manifesto: Making, Folklore and Community (2025, Quickthorn)
- Mindfulness in Knitting: Meditations on Craft and Calm (2017, Leaping Hare Press)
- Craftism: The Art of Craft and Activism (2014, Arsenal Pulp Press)
