= The Lakes School =

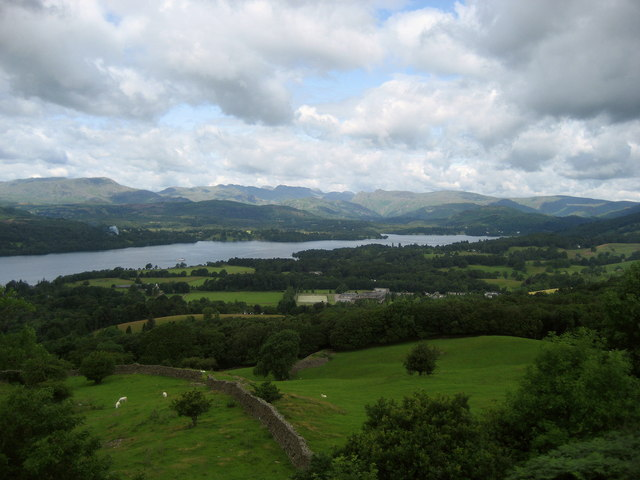
- The Lakes School, centre, from Orrest Head

Location
- Troutbeck Bridge; Windermere, Cumbria, LA23 1HW; England; 54.39242°N 2.92239°W

Information
- Type: Community school
- Established: 1965
- Local authority: Westmorland and Furness
- Department for Education URN: 112379 Tables
- Ofsted: Reports
- Head Teacher: Sharon Rainey
- Gender: Coeducational
- Age: 11 to 18
- Enrolment: 462 as of December 2022
- Website: http://thelakesschool.com

The Lakes School is a coeducational secondary school and sixth form located in Troutbeck Bridge, Windermere, in the English county of Cumbria.

It is a comprehensive community school administered by Westmorland and Furness Council. Its catchment area includes: Grasmere, Langdale Valley, Ambleside, Troutbeck, Windermere, Bowness on Windermere and Staveley. The school also offers evening adult education classes to the local community.

== History ==
The Lakes School is one of the first purpose built comprehensive schools and was opened by Tony Crosland MP, Secretary of State for Education, on 8 October 1965 the same year he issued Circular 10/65 promoting comprehensive education.

The school was first thought of in 1936 and brought together three existing schools, Windermere Grammar for boys, Kelswick, Ambleside, coeducational and Old College, Windermere, for girls. Windermere Grammar School is in the Guinness Book of Records as the first ever comprehensive school formed in 1945 after the Education Act 1944.

The school stands on the site of where Calgarth Estate once stood, the wartime housing scheme built to house workers and families brought to the Lake District to work at the nearby Short Sunderland Flying Boat factory that stood on the shores of Windermere during WW2.

Significantly, it was at Calgarth Estate that 300 young Holocaust Survivors stayed in 1945 after the horrors of the Holocaust. The estate was depicted in the BBC/Warner Bros film drama The Windermere Children first broadcast in 2020. The drama won the First Prize for Best Television Drama of 2020 in the Berlin Prix Europa Awards.

Sir Ben Helfgott and the young Jewish children are Honorary Alumni at Lakes School though the school was opened twenty years after they had departed to begin new lives elsewhere.

== Notable alumni ==
- Chris Acland - Musician, Drummer with Lush. Attended the school from 1978-1985.
- Michael Cumming - Director, Filmmaker. Best known for his award winning comedy directing on Brass Eye, Toast Of London. Attended the school from 1974-1981.
