= Listed buildings in Windermere and Bowness =

Windermere and Bowness is a civil parish in the Westmorland and Furness District of Cumbria, England. It contains 82 listed buildings that are recorded in the National Heritage List for England. Of these, four are listed at Grade I, the highest of the three grades, twelve are at Grade II*, the middle grade, and the others are at Grade II, the lowest grade. The parish is in the Lake District National Park and lies to the east of Lake Windermere. It contains the towns of Windermere and Bowness-on-Windermere, the village of Troutbeck Bridge, and the surrounding countryside. Most of the older listed buildings are farmhouses and farm buildings, and later listed buildings include large houses and associated structures, one of the houses being on an island in the lake. The other listed buildings include churches and items in churchyards, public houses and hotels, bridges, a drinking fountain, and boathouses.

== Key ==
Grade	Criteria
I	Buildings of exceptional interest, sometimes considered to be internationally important
II*	Particularly important buildings of more than special interest
II	Buildings of national importance and special interest

== Buildings ==
Name and location	Photograph	Date	Notes	Grade
St Martin's Church; 54.36414°N 2.92099°W		c. 1483	The base of the tower dates from an earlier period, and there were additions probably in the 16th century. The church was restored in 1870 by Paley and Austin, who also added the top and the stair turret to the tower, and extended the chancel. A vestry was added in 1911 and was later converted into a chapel. The church is built in local slate rubble and has sandstone dressings. It consists of a nave and a chancel with a clerestory, full-length aisles, a south porch, a northeast chapel, and a west tower with a saddleback roof.	I
Calgarth Hall; 54.38895°N 2.92730°W	—	Early 16th century	A stone house with a slate roof and two storeys, consisting of a hall with cross-wings.	I
Far Orrest Old Farm Cottage; 54.39915°N 2.90592°W	—	16th century (probable)	A stone cottage with a slate roof, two low storeys, four bays, and a full-width rear outshut. On the front is a gabled porch and a lean-to open-fronted store. The windows are mullioned and transomed, and the roof is supported by a cruck truss.	II*
Near Orrest Farmhouse; 54.39407°N 2.89655°W	—	16th century	A roughcast farmhouse with a slate roof, and two low storeys. To the right is a two-bay gable, and to the left of this is a four-bay range. The windows are sashes. Further to the left, and with a south wing, are a barn and shippons, with ventilation slits, and a drying canopy.	II*
St Martin's Rectory; 54.35789°N 2.92626°W	—	16th century (possible)	The rectory was partly rebuilt in 1650 and in 1680, it was improved in 1770, and expanded in the 19th century. The building is in stone, partly roughcast, and has a slate roof with round chimneys. There are two low storeys, and the building has an irregular plan. There is a two-storey porch with a fireplace in the upper room, and the windows are modern.	II*
Bellman Ground; 54.33965°N 2.92489°W	—	17th century	A stone house with a slate roof and two storeys. It has a front range of three bays and a three-bay rear wing. In the centre of the front is a porch, and the windows are sashes.	II
Bordriggs Farmhouse, farm buildings and barn 54.35475°N 2.91912°W	—	17th century	The farmhouse and buildings are in stone with slate roofs. The house has two storeys, an L-shaped plan, a round chimney, and there is a gabled porch in the centre. The windows are replacements with hood moulds there are two on the ground floor and three above. The attached farm buildings form an open courtyard, and there is a separate barn to the south containing ventilation slits.	II
Causeway Farmhouse; 54.39248°N 2.90206°W	—	Mid 17th century	The farmhouse is in roughcast stone and has a slate roof. There are two storeys, a main range of four bays, and a wide gabled cross-wing at the left. On the front is a gabled porch with an arched entrance, and the windows are modern.	II*
Common Farmhouse; 54.38845°N 2.89155°W	—	17th century	The farmhouse is in stone, and has two low storeys, five bays, and a staircase wing at the rear. On the front is a gabled stone porch containing slate benches and with a segmental-arched entrance. Above the ground floor windows are hood moulds.	II
Droomer Cottage; 54.37047°N 2.89404°W	—	17th century	A pebbledashed stone cottage with a slate roof, two storeys, three bays, and a single-storey wing to the left. On the front is an open porch containing a bench, and the windows are casements.	II
Ferry Cottage; 54.38155°N 2.92125°W	—	17th century	The cottage is in stone and has a slate roof with a round chimney, and two storeys. On the north front is a round staircase wing. To the right are a slate and stone stable and shippon with a loft door and a belfry. On the south front are four windows in the ground floor, three above, and a slate hood mould between the storeys. All the windows are mullioned.	II*
Heaning Farmhouse; 54.38448°N 2.87695°W	—	17th century	The farmhouse is in roughcast stone with a slate roof. It has two low storeys, seven bays, a lean-to on the left, and a rear wing. There is a slate hood mould above the ground floor windows, and most of the windows are modern.	II
High Lindeth and farm building 54.35004°N 2.90787°W	—	17th century	The house is in stone with a flagged roof, two low storeys, and two bays. On the front is a gabled porch containing benches. To the left is a bay window, to the right is a square window, and in the upper floor are two modern square windows. To the right of the house is a farm building with ventilation slits and a round chimney.	II
Hole in t'Wall public house and attached buildings 54.36490°N 2.92080°W		17th century	Formerly the New Hall Inn, the public house is roughcast with a slate roof, two storeys and four bays. On the front are two doorways, and windows, most of which are mullioned with sashes. Attached at right angles to the south are a former stable and a loft.	II
Longmire; 54.40948°N 2.90432°W	—	17th century (or earlier)	A roughcast stone house with think walls, a string course, and a slate roof with a round chimney. There are two storeys and five bays. On the front is a gabled porch, and the windows are mullioned and transomed. At the rear is a spinning gallery with balusters, and a large gable with three string courses.	II*
Matson Ground (house to west) with attached buildings 54.36211°N 2.90012°W	—	17th century	The house is in stone with a slate roof, two storeys, and four bays. Most of the windows are sashes, and there are small square casement windows. In the gable end is a gabled porch with a datestone. A long range of stone farm buildings extends at right angles to the north; these contain two small windows and a loading door.	II
Millbeckstock Cottage; 54.37002°N 2.91997°W	—	17th century	A stone cottage with a slate roof, two low storeys and six bays. On the front is a gabled porch, and there are casement windows in the upper storey.	II
Mislet Cottage; 54.38922°N 2.87583°W	—	17th century	This originated as a Friends' meeting house. It is in roughcast stone, and has a slate roof and one storey. On the front is a gabled porch, with two small windows to the left, and two larger windows to the right.	II
Mislet Farmhouse; 54.38905°N 2.87616°W	—	17th century	A roughcast stone farmhouse with a slate roof, and an L-shaped plan. It has two low storeys, a main range of five bays, and a wing of two bays. Above the door is a fanlight, and the windows are sashes.	II
Old Fallbarrow; 54.36555°N 2.92244°W	—	17th century	The house was altered in the 18th century. It is in stone, and has two storeys and four bays. The windows are sashes.	II
Barn, Old Fallbarrow; 54.36693°N 2.92409°W	—	17th century	The barn is in stone with a slate roof. It has a rectangular plan.	II
Orrest Head Farmhouse; 54.37956°N 2.90058°W	—	17th century	The farmhouse has thick roughcast walls, a slate roof, and two low storeys. It has a cruciform plan, with a lean-to porch in an angle at the rear. There is a long range of barns with external stairs. The windows are modern.	II
Orrest Head House; 54.38055°N 2.90098°W	—	17th century	A rendered stone house with a slate roof, two storeys and five bays. In the ground floor is an iron trellis verandah, and a French window. The other windows are sashes.	II
The Crosses; 54.39285°N 2.90871°W	—	17th century	Originally a farmhouse, it is in stone with a slate roof. There are two low storeys, a slate canopy over the doorway, and most of the windows are sashes. To the right is a former barn with a garage door, ventilation slits, a loft door, and a stable door. Inside there are exposed crucks.	II
The Old House; 54.39403°N 2.91909°W	—	17th century or earlier	The house is in rendered stone with a roof of Westmorland slate, and it has an L-shaped plan. There are two storeys and two bays. Most of the windows are casements, with hood moulds above the ground floor windows. In the angle between the ranges is a stair turret.	II
The Yews; 54.34623°N 2.92225°W	—	17th century	Originally the home farm for Storrs Hall, farm buildings have been incorporated into the house. It was enlarged in 1896, and further enlarged in 1906 in Georgian style. It is in stone with hipped slate roofs, an irregular plan, and most of the windows are modern.	II
Fusethwaite Yeat; 54.40398°N 2.90746°W		Late 17th century	A stone house with a slate roof and a round chimney. It has two low storeys and four bays. On the front is a wide gabled porch with stone benches. Most of the windows are sashes, with a hood mould above the ground floor windows. At the rear are three small windows.	II
Heaning Cottage and shippons 54.38513°N 2.87670°W	—	Late 17th century	A roughcast stone cottage with a slate roof, two storeys, and four bays. On the front is a lean-to timber porch, the windows are modern, and above the ground floor windows is a hood mould. The stone shippons extend to the left under the same roof.	II
High Borrans Farmhouse and farm buildings 54.40077°N 2.87513°W	—	1686	The buildings are in roughcast stone, with a slate band between the storeys, and a slate roof. The house has two storeys and four irregular bays. On the front is a gabled porch, the windows are modern cross-windows, and the chimneys are round. To the right are farm buildings with an L-shaped plan, and they include a barn and shippons that have ventilation slits.	II
Helm Farmhouse, Cottage and barn 54.36505°N 2.90508°W	—	1692	The buildings are in pebbledashed stone with slate roofs. The farmhouse and cottage form an L-shaped plan, with one dwelling in each wing. There are two storeys, the windows are mullioned, they contain casements, and have hood moulds. In the angle is a lean-to porch with a balustraded balcony, and in the wall near the porch are bee boles. Attached to the farmhouse is a stone barn.	II*
Braithwaite Fold; 54.35305°N 2.92377°W	—	c. 1700	A rendered house with a Lakeland slate roof. There are two storeys and five bays. Above the doorway is a two-bay gallery with a baluster railing and an overhanging roof carried on posts. The windows are mullioned.	II
Rose Cottage; 54.36441°N 2.92077°W		c. 1700	A pebbledashed stone house with a slate roof. There are two low storeys, and four bays. On the front is a moulded doorcase with a round-arched hood, and the windows are sashes.	II
Green Farmhouse; 54.36803°N 2.92121°W	—	17th to 18th century	A house with thick stone walls, a slate roof, and a round chimney. There are two low storeys, and a staircase wing with a catslide roof containing a mullioned and transomed window, and a window with a single light. Elsewhere there is a mullioned window.	II
Knotts Farmhouse Cottage with attached buildings 54.39412°N 2.91522°W	—	Early 18th century	The cottage is in stone on boulders and has a slate roof. There are two low storeys and two bays. The windows are mullioned, and above the ground floor windows is a slate hood mould. To the left is an L-shaped barn with a window, a barn door approached by a ramp, and ventilation slits.	II
Rayrigg Hall; 54.37472°N 2.92068°W	—	Early 18th century	A roughcast stone house with a slate roof, two storeys, and an irregular plan. A stable and coach house have been incorporated into the house, forming a courtyard. On the east front is a gabled porch, there are flanking gabled wings, and the windows are mullioned and transomed. On the south front are three sash windows flanked by two two-storey bow windows, and there is another bow window on the west front.	II*
Rayrigg Hall Farmhouse; 54.37485°N 2.92092°W	—	Early 18th century	The farmhouse has thick stone walls and a slate roof. There are two storeys, and on the front are two mullioned windows on each floor.	II*
The Spinney; 54.36349°N 2.91989°W		Early 18th century (probable)	The building is on a corner site, it is in roughcast stone with a slate roof and two storeys. There is a gabled porch, mullioned windows, and a slate hood mould. The left return contains a semicircular bow window.	II
13 Troutbeck Bridge; 54.39411°N 2.91916°W	—	18th century	A pebbledashed stone house with a slate roof and an L-shaped plan. There are two storeys and two bays. The windows are modern with small panes, with a hood mould over the ground floor windows.	II
15 and 17 Troutbeck Bridge; 54.39409°N 2.91942°W	—	18th century	A roughcast house with thick stone walls, a slate roof, two storeys and five bays. On the front is a timber porch, the windows are modern, and there are hood moulds above the ground floor windows.	II
Calgarth View; 54.39388°N 2.91934°W	—	18th century	A stone house, later divided into two dwellings, it has a slate roof, two storeys, and three bays. On the front are two porches, the windows are modern, and the gable end facing the road is buttressed.	II
Christopher North's Cottage and Old Elleray; 54.38370°N 2.90783°W	—	18th century	A pair of rendered stone cottages with a slate roof. There are two storeys, three bays, a single-storey extension to the right, and a two-storey extension to the left. In the main part the windows in the upper floor are sashes, and in the ground floor they are modern with a hood mould. In the left extension are two full-height windows, and the left extension contains a door and a small-paned window in each floor.	II
Grove Cottage; 54.38389°N 2.89075°W	—	18th century	The cottage has thick roughcast stone walls and a slate roof. There are two storeys, five bays and a central doorway. Most of the windows are mullioned and transomed.	II
High Miller Ground; 54.38176°N 2.91927°W	—	18th century	A stone house with a slate roof and two round chimneys, it has two storeys and three bays. The windows are sashes, with a slate string course between the storeys. On the side facing the lake is a lean-to verandah.	II*
Stags Head Inn; 54.36417°N 2.92146°W		18th century (probable)	The building has three storeys. The earlier part is stuccoed with a flagged roof, and has three bays and a central doorway with a wooden porch. To the left is a higher Victorian extension in slate with quoins. On the corner is a four-storey octagonal tower with a pyramidal roof and a weathervane. The windows in both parts are sashes.	II
Fold Head; 54.36556°N 2.92123°W	—	1751	A stone house with a slate roof, two storeys, two bays, and a rear wing. On the front is a doorway with a solid fanlight and a gabled hood, and above it is a round-topped inscribed datestone. The windows on the front are cross-windows, and in the rear wing are a wooden oriel window and a rectangular bay window.	II
Belle Isle; 54.36020°N 2.93582°W		1774	The house stands on Belle Isle in Windermere Lake, and was designed by John Plaw. It has a circular plan on a square basement, with three storeys and attics, and a dome with a lantern. The portico has four unfluted Ionic columns, and there are four Venetian windows. The house was severely damaged by fire in 1994, and has since been reconstructed.	I
12–18 High Street; 54.38034°N 2.90613°W	—	Late 18th century	A row of four stone cottages with a slate roof and two low storeys. Each cottage has one bay, a gabled timber porch, a door with a fanlight, and sash windows with hood moulds above the ground floor windows.	II
Laurel Cottage; 54.36368°N 2.91983°W		Late 18th century	A roughcast stone house with a slate roof. There are two storeys and four bays. In the ground floor are a door with a fanlight, and three bay windows, and in the upper storey are four sash windows.	II
Storrs Hall; 54.33921°N 2.93587°W		1795–97	Originally a country house, it was considerably altered and extended in about 1808–09 by Joseph Gandy. Since 1892 it has been used as a hotel. The main part of the house and the wings are in stuccoed sandstone, and the service wing is in rendered stone. The main part has two storeys, a front of three bays, the central bay canted, flanked by projecting wings with one bay at the front and three on the sides. At the rear is the service wing. On the north front is an entrance loggia with a Greek Doric colonnade and screen walls with niches. Above the entrance hall is a circular domed rotunda.	II*
Storrs Temple; 54.33885°N 2.93894°W		1804	A garden house at the end of a causeway projecting into Lake Windermere from the grounds of Storrs Hall. It is an octagonal stone structure with a cornice added later. There are four arched openings, and inside are tablets commemorating the admirals Duncan, St Vincent, Howe, and Nelson.	II*
Tomb of Rasselas Belfield; 54.36414°N 2.92064°W	—	1822	The tomb of Rasselas Belfield, a slave who achieved freedom, is in the churchyard of St Martin's Church. It consists of a rectangular headstone with a shouldered triangular top. On the headstone is an inscription, above which is an incised scrolled design.	II
China Cottage; 54.33810°N 2.93347°W	—	Early 19th century	A stone house with a hipped slate roof. There are two storeys, and a large central oriel window containing sashes.	II
Ferney Green, Ferney Cross and Hazelrigg; 54.35710°N 2.91895°W	—	Early 19th century	Originally one house in Regency style and later subdivided, it is in rendered stone with a slate roof and two storeys. In the centre is a projection with a segmental head, and an entrance with pilasters. The windows are sashes.	II
White House; 54.36473°N 2.92119°W		Early 19th century	The house, later used for other purposes, is rendered with a slate roof, three storeys and three bays. Above the door is a lean-to hood. Some of the windows are sashes, and others are replacements.	II
Matson Ground (house to south-east); 54.36188°N 2.89953°W	—	c. 1830	The house has two storeys, an irregular plan, and a main block of two bays flanked by two-bay wings. In the centre of the main block is a porch with round columns, Egyptian capitals, a panelled frieze and a dentilled cornice. Over the door is a stair window with Gothic tracery, and the other windows are sashes. In the roof are two dormers.	II
Old Belfield; 54.35553°N 2.92090°W	—	c. 1840	A stone house, later subdivided. it is partly rendered and has a slate roof and two storeys. On the front facing the lake is a verandah, and the windows are sashes.	II
Belsfield Hotel; 54.36177°N 2.92101°W		1844	Originally a large house by George Webster in Italianate style, it has been a hotel since 1890. The hotel is stuccoed, and has quoins and a modillioned cornice. The front facing the lake has three storeys, 13 bays, and a verandah. At the northern end is a four-stage tower with a three-storey bay window. The windows have architraves, and some are round-headed.	II
Windermere Hotel; 54.38075°N 2.90391°W		1840s	The hotel was built for the arrival of the railway in 1847. It is in slate with a moulded eaves cornice, and has three storeys. The central part has five bays and an ornate cast iron verandah and gabled porch. To the right is a three-bay wing, the central bay projecting with quoins and an open pediment, and to the left is an Italianate four-storey tower.	II
Black Moss Bridge; 54.37736°N 2.87577°W	—	c. 1847	The bridge was built by the Kendal and Windermere Railway to carry a road over the line. It was designed by Joseph Locke and is built in limestone. The bridge consists of a single elliptical arch with alternating voussoirs springing from an impost band. It is flanked by abutments ending in slim piers, and on the parapets are flat coping stones.	II
Near Droomer Bridge; 54.37539°N 2.88752°W	—	c. 1847	The bridge was built by the Kendal and Windermere Railway to carry a track over the line. It was designed by Joseph Locke and is built in limestone. The bridge consists of a single elliptical arch with alternating voussoirs springing from an impost band. It is flanked by abutments ending in slim piers, and on the parapets are flat coping stones.	II
St Mary's Church; 54.38090°N 2.91035°W		1847–48	The church originated as a chapel, a south aisle was added in 1852 by Miles Thompson, and a north aisle in 1858 by J. S. Crowther. In 1871 the church was restored and the chancel and vestry were added by Paley and Austin, followed by the tower in 1881–82. another vestry was added in 1961 by George Pace, and the interior of the church has since been reordered. The church is built in slate with sandstone dressings and slate roofs. It has a cruciform plan, and consists of a nave, north and south aisles under separate roofs, north and south porches, north and south transepts, a chancel, two vestries, and a tower at the crossing. The tower has three stages, a stair turret at the southeast corner, and a parapet with a quatrefoil frieze, and a small pyramidal roof.	II
1 Church Street; 54.36438°N 2.92115°W		Mid 19th century (probable)	A row of buildings with three storeys and moulded eaves on brackets. The ground floor is rusticated, and the upper floors are roughcast. In the ground floor are shop fronts, and doorways with cornices. The upper floors contain sash windows, those in the middle floor having cornices. The corner is canted, and in the middle floor is an oriel window.	II
Crag Brow; 54.36463°N 2.91788°W	—	Mid 19th century	A house, later used for other purposes, it is roughcast with a slate roof and overhanging eaves, and has two storeys. The entrance porch has a moulded surround and an iron trellis. The windows are sashes.	II
Ye Olde Bath House; 54.36963°N 2.91161°W	—	1853	A house built in slate with a slate roof, it is in picturesque Gothic style. It has one storey and an attic, and three bays. The windows on the front and the left return have two lights and ogee heads with cusps, and in the roof are two large dormers. At each end is a Tudor arched doorway, that in the left return converted in to a window.	II
1 High Street; 54.38001°N 2.90576°W	—	1854	Originally a private house, and later used for other purposes, it is built in drystone slate. The house has quoins, a slate roof, two storeys with attics, and three bays, and the gables have pierced bargeboards. In the left gabled bay is a two-storey canted bay window. The middle bay contains a doorway with Tuscan jambs and Gothic glazing, and above it is a Gothic window with a pointed arch. In the right bay are three-light windows with hood moulds in each storey and a gabled dormer in the roof.	II
2 Victoria Street; 54.37997°N 2.90560°W	—	1854	A shop, built in slate, with quoins, a slate roof, two storeys with attics, and three bays. The left bay is gabled with a finial, and in the roof of the third bay is a gabled dormer; the gables have pierced bargeboards. In the ground floor is a 19th-century shop front with arched lights. Most of the windows are cross-windows with hood moulds.	II
Holehird; 54.39975°N 2.91007°W		1854	A country house designed by J. S. Crowther in Gothic Revival style, and significantly enlarged later in two phases during the 19th century. It is a long, low building in local slate and has two storeys. Its features include gables, octagonal chimneys, mullioned windows that have lights with pointed or Tudor arched heads, and bay windows. The entrance has a gabled porch with a Tudor arched head, and an ogee niche.	II
Wynlass Beck; 54.38588°N 2.91448°W	—	1854	A house designed by J. S. Crowther in Gothic Revival style, it is in Lakeland stone with sandstone ashlar dressings, quoins, and a Westmorland slate roof with coped gables. The house has an L-shaped plan, with a domestic range, and a service range with attached conservatory. The east front has two gables of differing sizes. The south, garden, front has two storeys with attics, and four bays with more gables and a bay window. The windows are mullioned with quoined surrounds. On the west front is a two-storey porch with a pyramidal roof.	II
Drinking fountain 54.38550°N 2.91388°W	—	1858	The drinking fountain is in Gothic style. It has a pointed arch, and above is an embattled wall.	II
Fallbarrow Hall; 54.36703°N 2.92402°W	—	c. 1869	A large house in Gothic style, built in local slate with sandstone dressings. It has two storeys, and the windows are mullioned. Other features include two-storey bay windows, a doorway with a pointed arch and carved spandrels, and a carved parapet and frieze. On the front facing the lake are an oriel window and two bay windows.	II
Cafeteria, Information Centre and boathouse, Fell Foot Park; 54.27612°N 2.95218°W		1869	Originally two boathouses, one converted for other purposes, they are in slate with limestone dressings, and have slate roofs. The boathouse to the south has a triangular arch with a keystone, a portcullis and sliding doors. Flanking this are turrets with projecting embattled parapets, and over it is an embattled gable with a cross and a finial. The north boathouse projects to the east and has an open gabled shed.	II
Northern Boathouse, Fell Foot Park; 54.27626°N 2.95222°W	—	1869	The boathouse is in slate rubble with a slate roof. The boat entrance has a Tudor arched head, and a timber portcullis and doors. It is flanked by turrets with slots and projecting embattled parapets. The gable is also embattled, and has a raised embattled panel.	II
The Priory; 54.38553°N 2.91670°W		1869	A large house in Decorated Gothic style, built in sandstone with a slate roof. At the right is a square belvedere tower with a pierced parapet and a round angle turret. The main part of the house has two storeys with attics, gables, an oriel window, and windows with pointed heads and cusped lights. There is a lower extension to the left.	II
Carver Memorial Chapel; 54.37316°N 2.90800°W		1879	Built as a Congregational church, it is in stone with quoins and a slate roof, and is in Gothic style. It has a tower at the northwest, with angle buttresses, a parapet, a recessed spire, and a turret. The tracery in the windows is Geometrical.	II
The Hydro; 54.36518°N 2.91536°W	—	1881	The building is in Italianate style, it is stuccoed, and is mainly in two storeys. There are cornice bands between the storeys, and in the roof are round-headed dormers. The entrance is in a three-storey tower, and has a round-arched doorway with fluted pilasters. The windows are sashes with moulded architraves, the lower ones with aprons. The front facing the lake has seven bays, and includes a round two-storey bay window with a balustraded parapet.	II
Lodge, The Hydro; 54.36492°N 2.91557°W	—	c. 1881	The lodge is roughcast with quoins, and is in Gothic style. There are two storeys and three bays. In the centre is an open timber porch and a doorway with a pointed arch and Gothic tracery. The windows are sashes, the window above the door and the ground floor windows have triangular heads, and the others have plain heads. In the left gable end is an oriel window with a niche above.	II
Thickholme Bridge (Thirlmere Aqueduct); 54.40618°N 2.91434°W	—	1893	The aqueduct carries three large pipes with water from Thirlmere to Manchester over the Trout Beck. The pipes are on a ribbed steel deck, and are concealed by cast iron side panels encased in a balustrade. The aqueduct consists of a single segmental arch with decorated spandrels, and it incorporates a footbridge.	II
Blackwell House; 54.34276°N 2.92249°W		1899	A house designed by Baillie Scott in Arts and Crafts style, later used for other purposes. It is roughcast with sandstone ashlar dressings and a roof of Westmorland slate with coped gables. It has two storeys with attics, and an L-shaped plan, with a main range and a service wing.	I
Outbuildings, Bellman Ground; 54.33986°N 2.92448°W	—	Undated	A long stone building with a slate roof to the north of the farmhouse, it contains shippons and a barn.	II
Lodge, Fallbarrow Hall; 54.36700°N 2.92086°W	—	Undated	The lodge is in stone, and is in Gothic style. There are two storeys and two wings with a lean-to porch between them. Features include decorative bargeboards, windows with mullions and leaded panes, a bay window and an oriel window.	II
Barn northeast of Green Farmhouse; 54.36826°N 2.92110°W	—	Undated	The barn, which has been converted for domestic use, is in slate with quoins and a hipped roof.	II
The Terrace; 54.38027°N 2.90275°W	—	Undated	A row of five houses in Gothic style by, or influenced by, Augustus Pugin. They are in slate with slate roofs and two storeys, and each house has three bays, with gables and buttresses. The windows are mullioned, and the doorways have Tudor arched heads. At the end is a bay window.	II
