= The Long Kiss Goodnight =

1996 American action thriller film by Renny Harlin

- Theatrical release poster
- Directed by: Renny Harlin
- Written by: Shane Black
- Produced by: Stephanie Austin; Shane Black; Renny Harlin
- Starring: Geena Davis; Samuel L. Jackson; Patrick Malahide; Craig Bierko; Brian Cox; David Morse
- Cinematography: Guillermo Navarro
- Edited by: William C. Goldenberg
- Music by: Alan Silvestri
- Production companies: Forge; The Steve Tisch Company
- Distributed by: New Line Cinema
- Release date: October 11, 1996
- Running time: 120 minutes
- Country: United States
- Language: English
- Budget: $65 million
- Box office: $95.5 million

The Long Kiss Goodnight is a 1996 American action thriller film co-produced and directed by Renny Harlin, and produced by Shane Black and Stephanie Austin with screenplay written by Black. It stars Geena Davis, Samuel L. Jackson, Tom Amandes, Yvonne Zima, Brian Cox, Patrick Malahide, Craig Bierko and David Morse. The story follows amnesiac schoolteacher Samantha Caine (Davis) who sets out to recover her identity with the help of private detective Mitch Henessey (Jackson) when they discover a dark conspiracy.

Released by New Line Cinema on October 11, 1996, it grossed almost $96 million against a budget of $65 million, and gained a strong cult following.

== Plot ==
Samantha Caine is a schoolteacher in Honesdale, Pennsylvania, living with her boyfriend Hal and her daughter Caitlin. Eight years earlier, she was found on a New Jersey beach, pregnant and suffering from total amnesia. Unable to remember her real name or past, she has hired several private investigators to uncover her identity, most recently the down-on-his-luck Mitch Henessey.

Over Christmas, Samantha suffers a mild concussion in a car accident and discovers she has inexplicable knife-fighting skills. Soon afterward, "One-Eyed Jack", a convict who escaped from prison after recognizing her on television, breaks into her home. Samantha kills him bare-handed, revealing extraordinary combat abilities. Fearing she may endanger Hal and Caitlin, she leaves with Mitch, who has found a suitcase belonging to her, to investigate her past.

The suitcase contains a note directing them to Dr. Nathan Waldman. As they arrange to meet him at a train station, government agents intercept his calls. Samantha discovers that the suitcase's false bottom conceals a disassembled sniper rifle, which she expertly reassembles, along with other weapons. At the station, agents attack them, shooting several bystanders, but Waldman helps them escape. He reveals that Samantha is actually Charlene Elizabeth "Charly" Baltimore, an expert CIA assassin who disappeared eight years earlier. Uncertain whether to trust him, Samantha and Mitch leave to find another contact, Luke, whom she believes may have been Charly's fiancé.

Waldman catches up with them to warn that Luke was Charly's final target, code-named "Daedalus", but Luke kills the doctor before he can explain further. Luke then repeatedly subjects Samantha to near-drowning torture to extract information. The ordeal restores her memories and reveals her identity. She frees herself, kills Luke, and escapes with Mitch. Cutting and dyeing her hair platinum blonde, she fully reclaims her Charly persona and realizes that Samantha Caine was an assumed identity created to help her approach Daedalus eight years earlier.

Charly's former lover, Timothy, a psychological-operations specialist, kidnaps Caitlin and demands that Charly exchange herself for the girl. Charly traces his call to Niagara Falls, where she and Mitch uncover Daedalus' role in "Project Honeymoon", the mission Charly disrupted before losing her memory. The project involved a planned false flag chemical-bomb attack in Niagara Falls, designed to be blamed on Islamic terrorists to secure increased CIA funding. Timothy and a new team, led by CIA Director Leland Perkins, are preparing to carry out the attack.

In Niagara Falls, Timothy captures Charly and Mitch. Charly reveals that Timothy is Caitlin's biological father and begs him to spare their daughter, but he refuses. He locks Charly and Caitlin in a walk-in freezer, intending to kill them. They escape by detonating barrels of kerosene and then free Mitch, who helps Charly assault the staging area. Timothy launches the attack prematurely, and Caitlin locks herself inside a cage on the bomb-carrying truck, unaware of its cargo.

Charly pursues the truck, overpowers its driver, and diverts it from a Christmas parade before overturning it on the Niagara Falls International Bridge leading to Canada. She rescues Caitlin, but they are trapped near the bomb as Timothy and his agents attack from a helicopter. Mitch arrives by car and carries them into Canada moments before the bomb explodes, killing Timothy and his forces and destroying the bridge.

In an epilogue, Charly resumes her Samantha Caine identity and moves with Caitlin and Hal to a remote farmhouse. She declines an offer from the POTUS to join the State Department, potentially returning to government service. Meanwhile, Mitch capitalizes on the publicity surrounding the crisis, appearing on television with Larry King to discuss Perkins, who has been indicted for treason.

== Cast ==
- Geena Davis as Charly Baltimore / Samantha Caine
- Samuel L. Jackson as Mitch Henessey
- Patrick Malahide as CIA Director Leland Perkins
- Craig Bierko as Timothy
- Brian Cox as Dr. Nathan Waldman
- Sharon Washington as Fran Henessey
- David Morse as Luke / Daedalus
- G. D. Spradlin as POTUS
- Tom Amandes as Hal
- Yvonne Zima as Caitlin
- Melina Kanakaredes as Trin
- Alan North as Earl
- Edwin Hodge as Todd Hennessy
- Matt Clark as Craig Morse

In addition, Joseph McKenna plays One-Eyed Jack, while Larry King has a cameo as himself.

== Production ==
In 1994, New Line Cinema paid a then-record US$4 million (equivalent to $8.7 million in 2025) for Shane Black's script. On February 27, 1996, during filming at the 127-year-old Windermere House in Ontario, Canada, a fire broke out, leaving only the stone verandah intact. There was speculation that it was caused by film lighting; however, it may have been a short circuit. When the fire started, filming was taking place on the frozen lake, with the house lighted from within to be seen in the background. It is unknown whether the fire was directly associated with filming, but the building was otherwise closed for the winter. Ironically, some of the remaining scenes there involved fire, but the real fire prevented them from being shot. The film crew helped evacuate nearby homes, but the fire did not spread beyond the building. The house was rebuilt and its support buildings were expanded the next year. In an early cut of the film, Mitch Henessey died, but during a test screening, an audience member shouted, "You can't kill Sam Jackson!" Renny Harlin changed the final cut so that Samuel L. Jackson's character survived.

== Reception ==
=== Box office ===
Over its opening weekend, the film grossed $9,065,363 from 2,245 theaters, coming in third among films opening that weekend. It grossed $33,447,612 in the US and Canada and $62,009,149 internationally, for a worldwide gross of $95,456,761.

Renny Harlin blamed the film's poor performance on confusing advertising, but Shane Black wondered if it might have been more successful if it were about a man: 'It might have made more money, they told me, but it had to be a woman. The lead had to be female.' It has also been suggested that the film's poor advertising campaign and lukewarm critical reception may have been a carry-over effect from Renny Harlin and Geena Davis's previous collaboration, Cutthroat Island, which was released 10 months earlier and was one of the biggest box office bombs of all time.

=== Critical reception ===
The Long Kiss Goodnight received mainly positive reviews. It holds a 67% approval rating at Rotten Tomatoes based on 61 reviews, with an average rating of 6/10. The site's consensus states: "Smart, sharp-witted, and fueled by enjoyably over-the-top action, The Long Kiss Goodnight makes up in impact what it lacks in consistent aim." On Metacritic, the film has a score of 44 out of 100 based on reviews from 20 critics, indicating "mixed or average reviews". Audiences polled by CinemaScore gave the film a median grade of "A−" on an A+ to F scale.

Christine James from Boxoffice gave it 3 and a half out of 5 stars, calling it "a lot of fun", but believing that there were some weaknesses in the script. Roger Ebert gave it 2 and a half out of 4 stars, stating, "I admired it as an example of craftsmanship, but what a lot of time and money to spend on something of no real substance." In 2014, Time Out polled several film critics, directors, actors and stunt actors to list their top action films and The Long Kiss Goodnight placed 91st on the list.

In retrospect, Geena Davis said: “I love that movie. My character might be my favorite role—it’s a close call between Thelma and that one. Anyway, that movie came out great and got some good reception, but it didn’t soar to heights, let’s say, perhaps as we wanted it to.” Samuel L. Jackson stated that The Long Kiss Goodnight was his favorite movie to watch that he was in. Of all the films he made, Renny Harlin said The Long Kiss Goodnight was his favorite:

"It is definitely. For me, it’s just very simple. It's a movie that had a really good screenplay, which meant that I was able to get really good actors … It's always challenging to make a movie, but it sure makes it easier when you have a good screenplay like in that one. When you have characters that are complex, and you have good drama and have some humour and some good action, you kind of have all the ingredients. When you have that you don't even need some crazy special effects—you just need to let the characters do their thing. It was a great experience."

== Sequel ==
A possible sequel was reportedly in the works in 2007.

== Bibliography ==
- Heldman, Caroline; Frankel, Laura Lazarus; Holmes, Jennifer (April–June 2016). ""Hot, black leather, whip" The (de)evolution of female protagonists in action cinema, 1960–2014". Sexualization, Media, and Society. 2 (2): 6. doi:10.1177/2374623815627789. Pdf.
