= Windermere and Bowness =

Civil parish in Cumbria, England

Coordinates: 54.3796°N 2.9063°W

- Civil parish
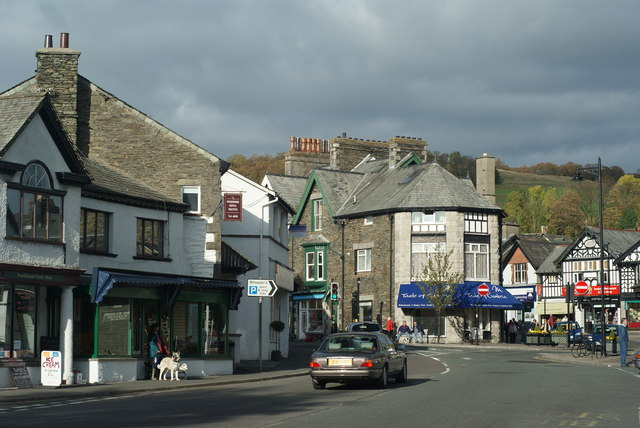
- Main Road, Windermere

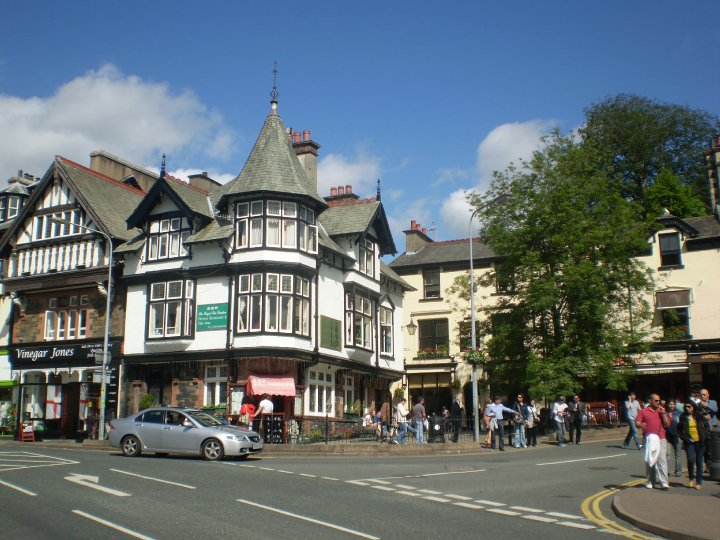
- Bowness-on-Windermere

- Location within Cumbria
- Area: 39.36 km^{2} (15.20 sq mi)
- Population: 7,676 (2021 census)
  - Density: 195/km^{2} (510/sq mi)
- Civil parish: Windermere and Bowness
- Unitary authority: Westmorland and Furness
- Ceremonial county: Cumbria
- Region: North West
- Country: England
- Sovereign state: United Kingdom
- Settlements: List: Windermere; Bowness-on-Windermere; Troutbeck Bridge; Storrs; Ferney Green; Heathwaite
- Police: Cumbria
- Fire: Cumbria
- Ambulance: North West
- Website: www.windermere-tc.gov.uk

Windermere and Bowness, formerly just Windermere, is a civil parish in the Westmorland and Furness district, in the ceremonial county of Cumbria, England. It includes the towns of Windermere and Bowness-on-Windermere, the village of Troutbeck Bridge, the hamlet of Storrs and the areas of Ferney Green and Heathwaite. In 2021 the parish had a population of 7,676. The parish borders Cartmel Fell, Claife, Colton, Crook, Hugill, Kentmere, Lakes, Satterthwaite and Staveley-in-Cartmel. There are 82 listed buildings in Windermere and Bowness. Windermere and Bowness Town Council's meetings take place at Langstone House.

== History ==
The parish was formed on 1 April 1974 from the previous parishes of Windermere and Bowness on Windermere as a successor parish to Windermere Urban District and became part of South Lakeland district. On 29 July 2020 the merged parish was renamed from "Windermere" to "Windermere and Bowness". On 1 April 2023 the parish became part of Westmorland and Furness district.
