= Windermere (submarine) =

Tourist submarine that operated on Windermere in Cumbria, England

History
- Builder: Malmari & Winberg, Finland
- Launched: Circa 1997

General characteristics
- Displacement: 24 long tons (24 t)
- Length: 10.05 m (33 ft 0 in)
- Beam: 2.8 m (9 ft 2 in)
- Draught: 3.5 m (11 ft 6 in)
- Speed: Cruising: 0.5 knots (0.93 km/h; 0.58 mph); Maximum: 3 knots (5.6 km/h; 3.5 mph)
- Endurance: 96 hours with 10 persons
- Test depth: 100 m (330 ft)
- Complement: 1 pilot, 10 passengers

Windermere is a tourist submarine that operated on Windermere, a lake in Cumbria, England. It was delivered to the marina at Lakeside in July 1997 and began commercial operation the next month. Carrying out dives on a wreck near to the marina and also cruises further afield it carried 3,500 passengers in its first year of operations. The Windermere struggled to attract full loads of passengers in 1998, which was its last year of operation. The vessel was later operated in Mauritius and now carries out dives in Barbados.

== Design ==
The Windermere is a MERGO 10 submersible designed and built by Malmari & Winberg, a former subsidiary of Finnish shipbuilder Rauma-Repola. The MERGO 10 vessels measured 10.05 m (33.0 ft) in length, 2.8 m (9.2 ft) in beam and 3.5 m (11 ft) in overall height. The vessels had a displacement of 24 long tons (24 t) and were capable of diving to 100 m (330 ft) depth. The MERGO 10 could carry ten passengers in addition to its pilot. The Windermere had a cruising speed of 0.5 knots (0.93 km/h; 0.58 mph) and a maximum speed of 3 knots (5.6 km/h; 3.5 mph). As well as large underwater viewports it was equipped with video cameras and powerful lights, it also had sonar. It carried enough oxygen to sustain 10 people for 96 hours.

A larger vessel in the series, the MERGO 50, could carry 48 passengers in addition to its 2–4 man crew. The series is now produced by the South Korean small vessel manufacturer Vogo.

== Operation ==
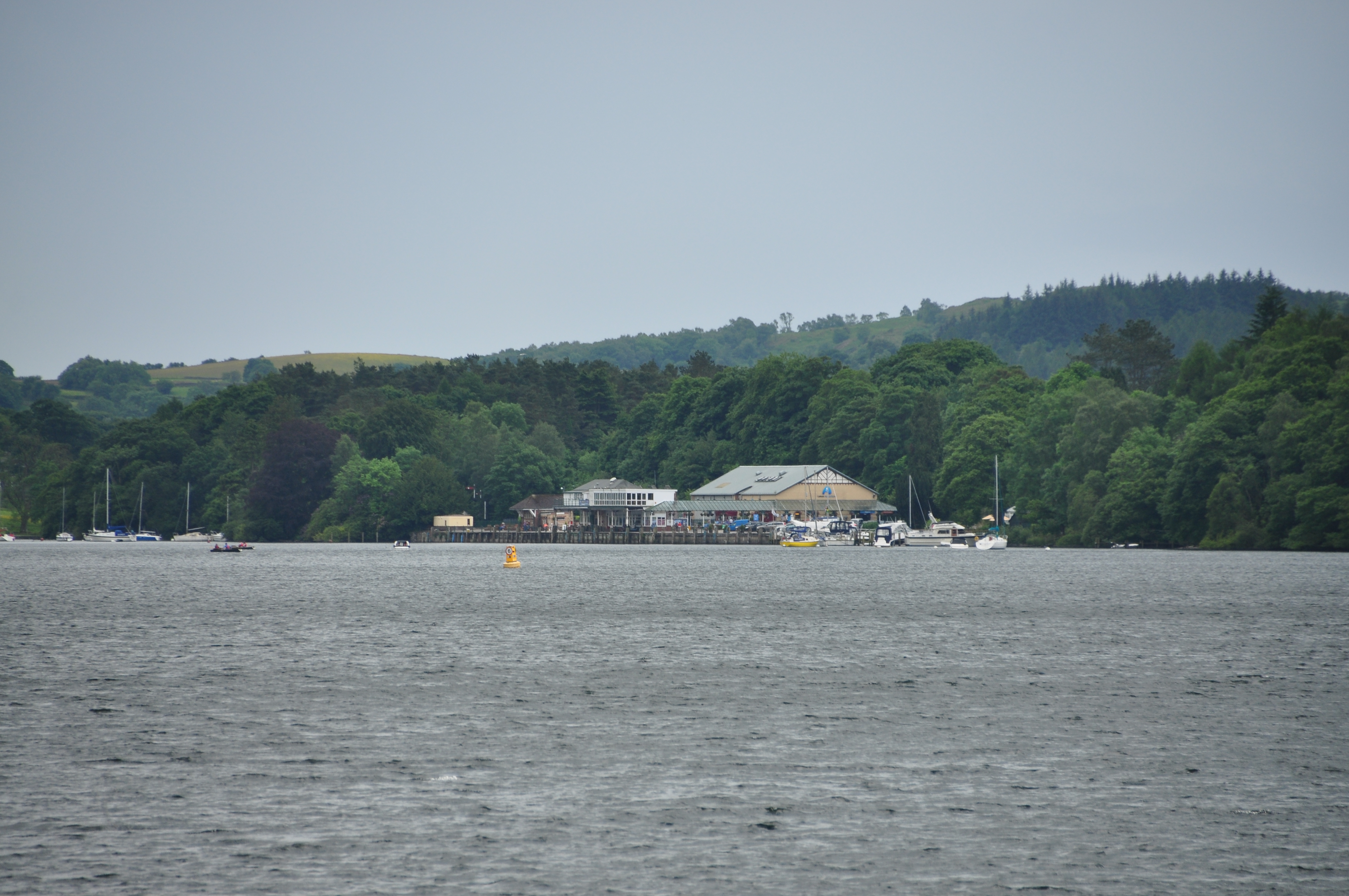
Lakeside, pictured in 2014

The Windermere was delivered by crane to Lakeside marina at the southern end of Windermere in July 1997. It was the first submarine to operate on the lake and was owned by Paul and Jane Whitfield who also operated a submarine at Loch Ness, Scotland. The vessel carried out a 200 feet (61 m) dive on 27 July 1997 and began commercial operation in August.

The pilot, Alan Whitfield, wore a blue boilersuit emblazoned with a union flag and would stand to attention on deck while passengers boarded. The Windermere usually operated on short trips, lasting around an hour, to a small wreck near to the marina but it also cruised as far as the YMCA hostel, around 2.5 kilometres (1.6 mi) north of the marina. A typical cruise cost £49.50 and it carried 3,500 passengers in the 1997 season. The venture proved unprofitable, perhaps due to competition from a newly opened underwater walkway at the nearby Aquatarium (now known as the Lakes Aquarium). The Windermere rarely carried a full complement in the 1998 season, which was its last on the lake. It afterwards saw service as a tourist vessel diving on shipwrecks in Mauritius and, as of February 2021, operated in Barbados.
