= Windermere House, Ontario =

Historic hotel and resort in Muskoka, Canada

Windermere House
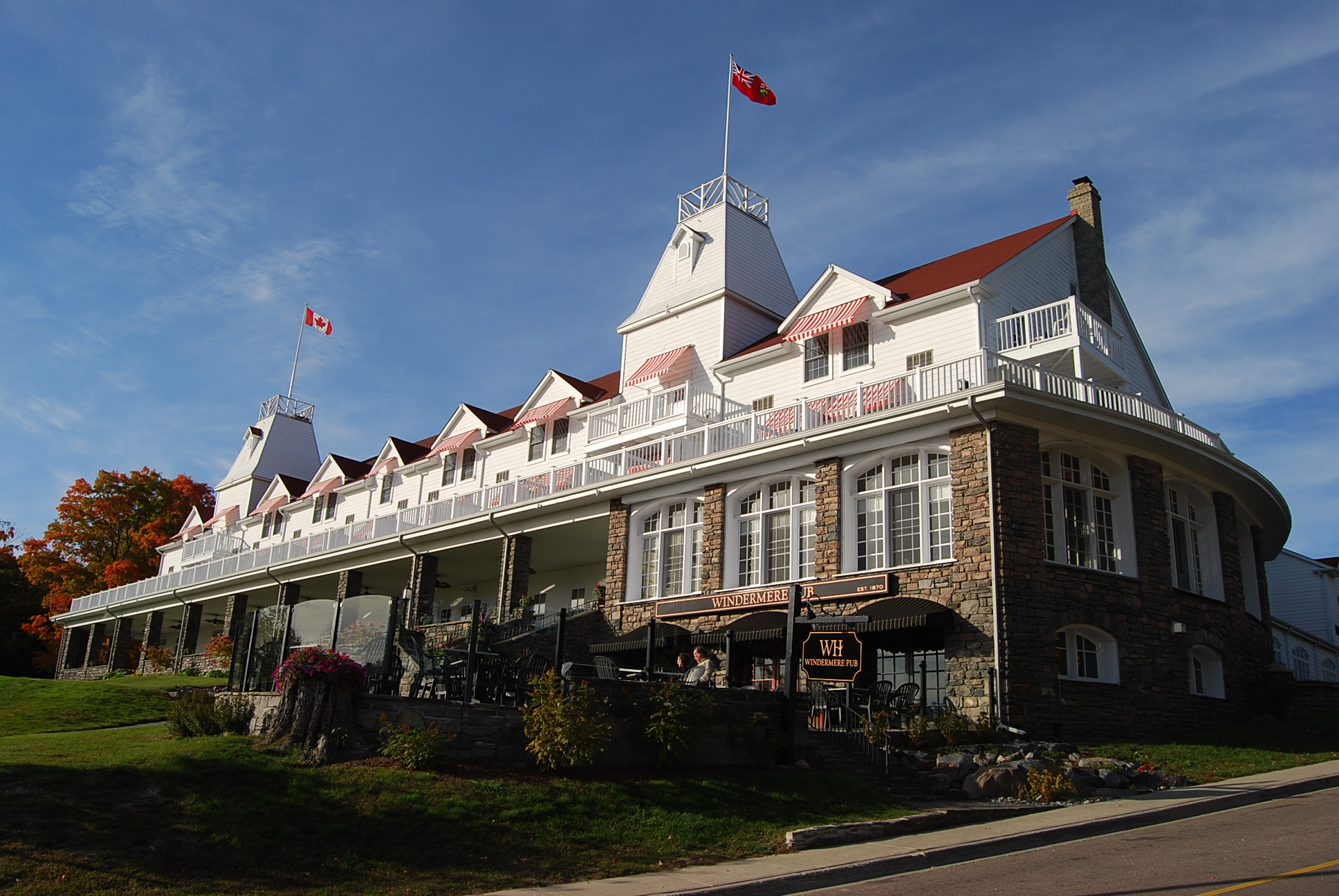
- Windermere House Hotel
- Interactive map of the Windermere House area

General information
- Architectural style: Victorian
- Location: Windermere, Ontario, Muskoka, Canada
- Coordinates: 45°09′52″N 79°32′59″W
- Completed: 1870
- Renovated: 1997
- Demolished: 1996

Technical details
- Size: 2500 square miles

Other information
- Number of rooms: 56

The Windermere House is a historic hotel and resort located at Windermere, within the Muskoka region of the province of Ontario, Canada. It lies beside the east side of Lake Rosseau.

The name Windermere is derived from a lake of the same name in the English Lake District, and the house is often referred to as The Lady of the Lakes by locals.

== History ==
Thomas Aitken, a resident of Peterborough County and a recent immigrant from the Shetland Islands, bought land in the area in 1863. He took up permanent residence in 1868, with the intention of farming the land, but it proved to be poor farmland. Also in 1868, a short distance to the north at the mouth of the Dee River, Archibald Taylor opened a post office named Windermere. In 1870 the post office moved to the Aitken home and Thomas Aitken officially became the postmaster.

In 1871, a lock was constructed at Port Carling, linking Lake Muskoka with Lake Rosseau and allowing steam ships to serve both lakes. In 1875, the Toronto, Simcoe and Muskoka Junction Railway reached Gravenhurst at the southern end of Lake Muskoka, and connecting with the lake steamers. Around 1872, Aitken started taking guests into his home for a few nights at a time. Over time this developed into his main business, and his home became a hotel. The name Windermere House came into use before or in 1886, based on the earlier post office name.

Windermere House was upgraded over the years, with significant upgrades in the 1880s, the 1900s, and the 1930s. It remained in the family's possession until 1981, when it was sold. In 1996, a fire broke out during the filming of The Long Kiss Goodnight, resulting in the destruction of everything but the stone veranda. The house, along with the boat house and marina, was subsequently rebuilt and restored in 1997.

== Facilities ==
The Windermere House features 56 guest rooms, multiple restaurants, a pub, and a private 4-bedroom cottage with an adjacent water tower built in the 1920s.

Situated behind the house is the Windermere Golf & Country Club, which was established in 1919 and boasts an 18-hole golf course. The resort also offers amenities such as an outdoor pool, tennis court, playground, church, marina, and beach for recreational activities. Spanning 2500 square miles, including the golf course and surrounding wilderness, Windermere House is the largest resort in the area.

== Use in the media ==
In addition to its disastrous use in The Long Kiss Goodnight, Windermere House also appeared in the 1985 TV movie Anne of Green Gables and the 1988 film Switching Channels.

== Gallery ==
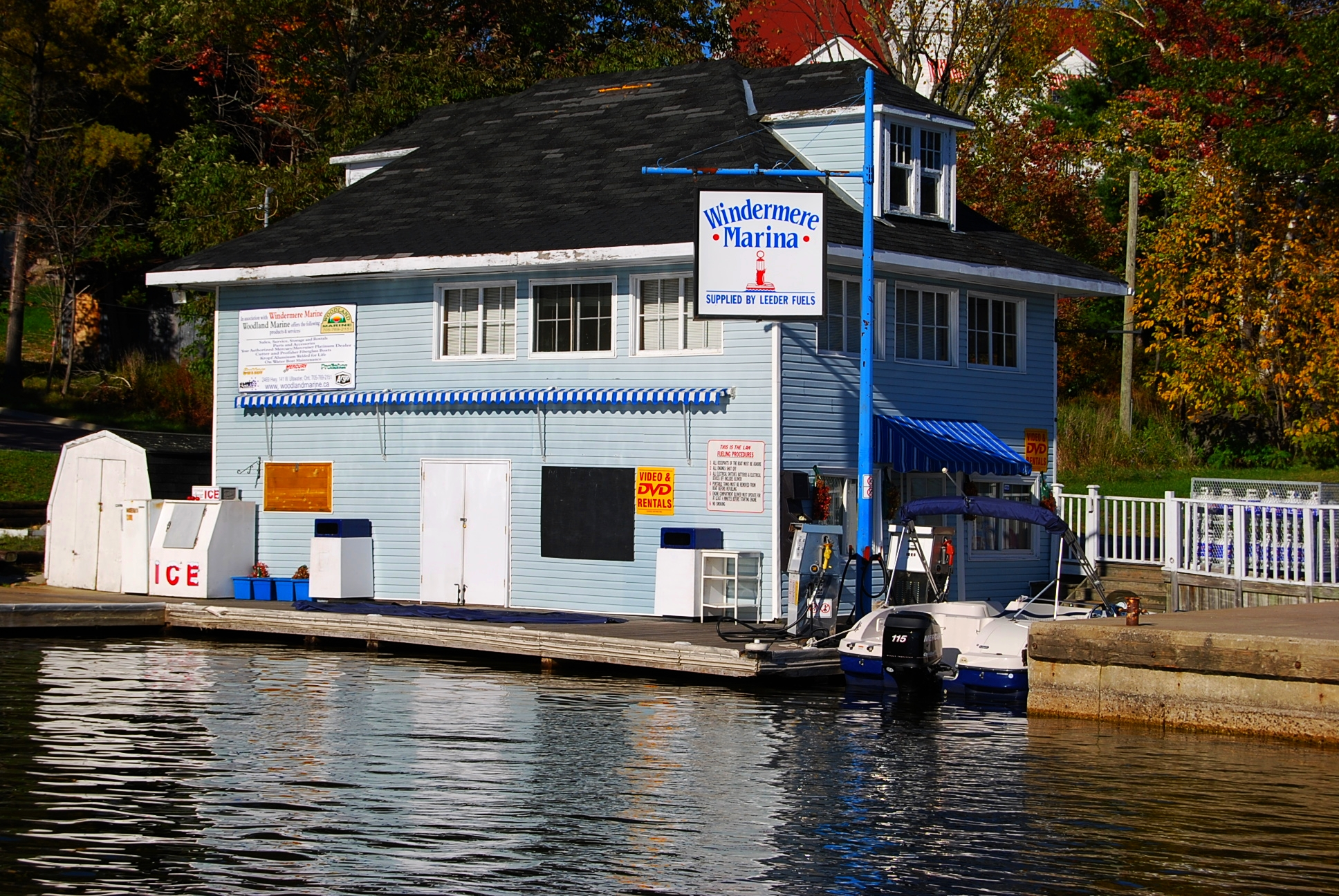
The Boathouse

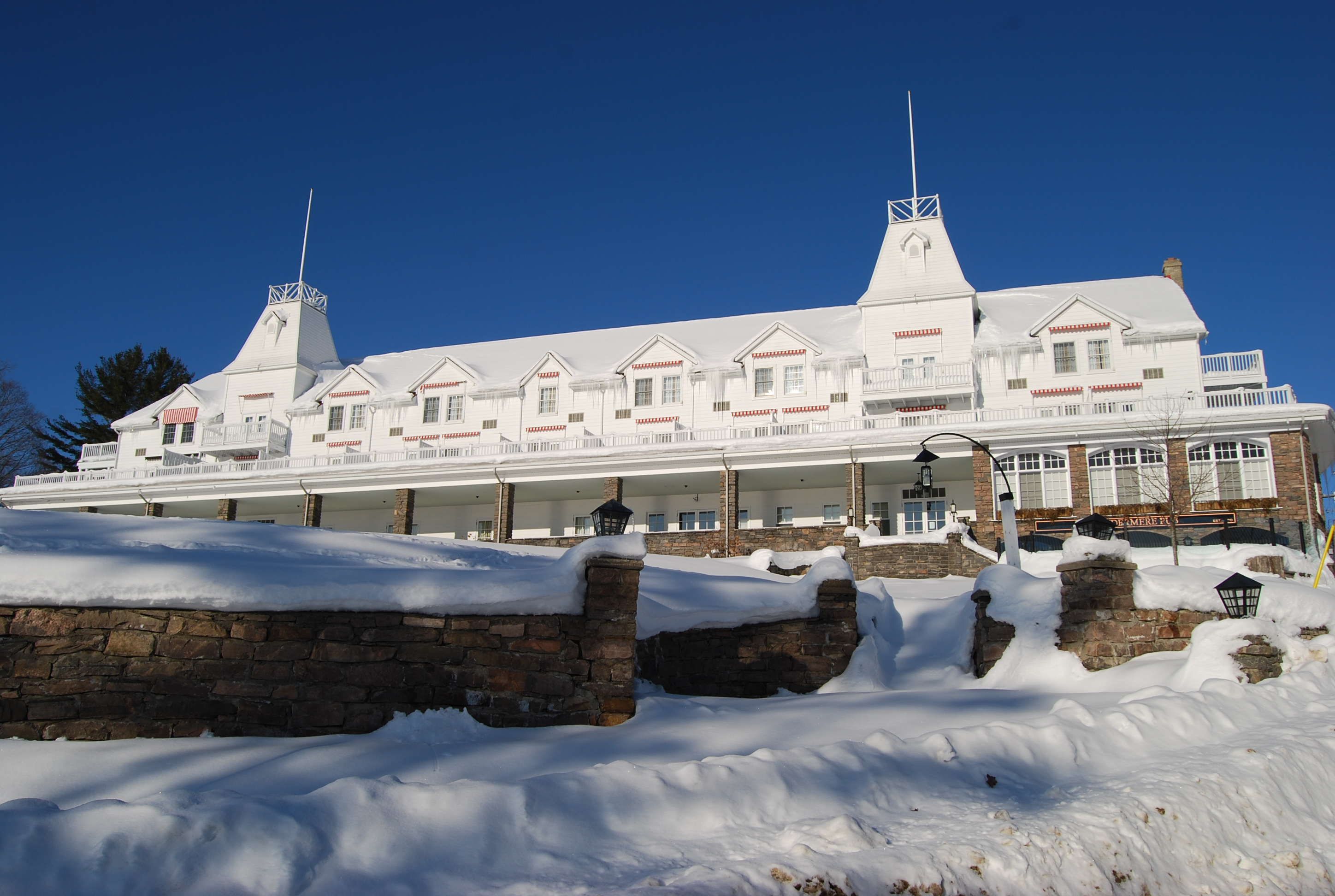
December

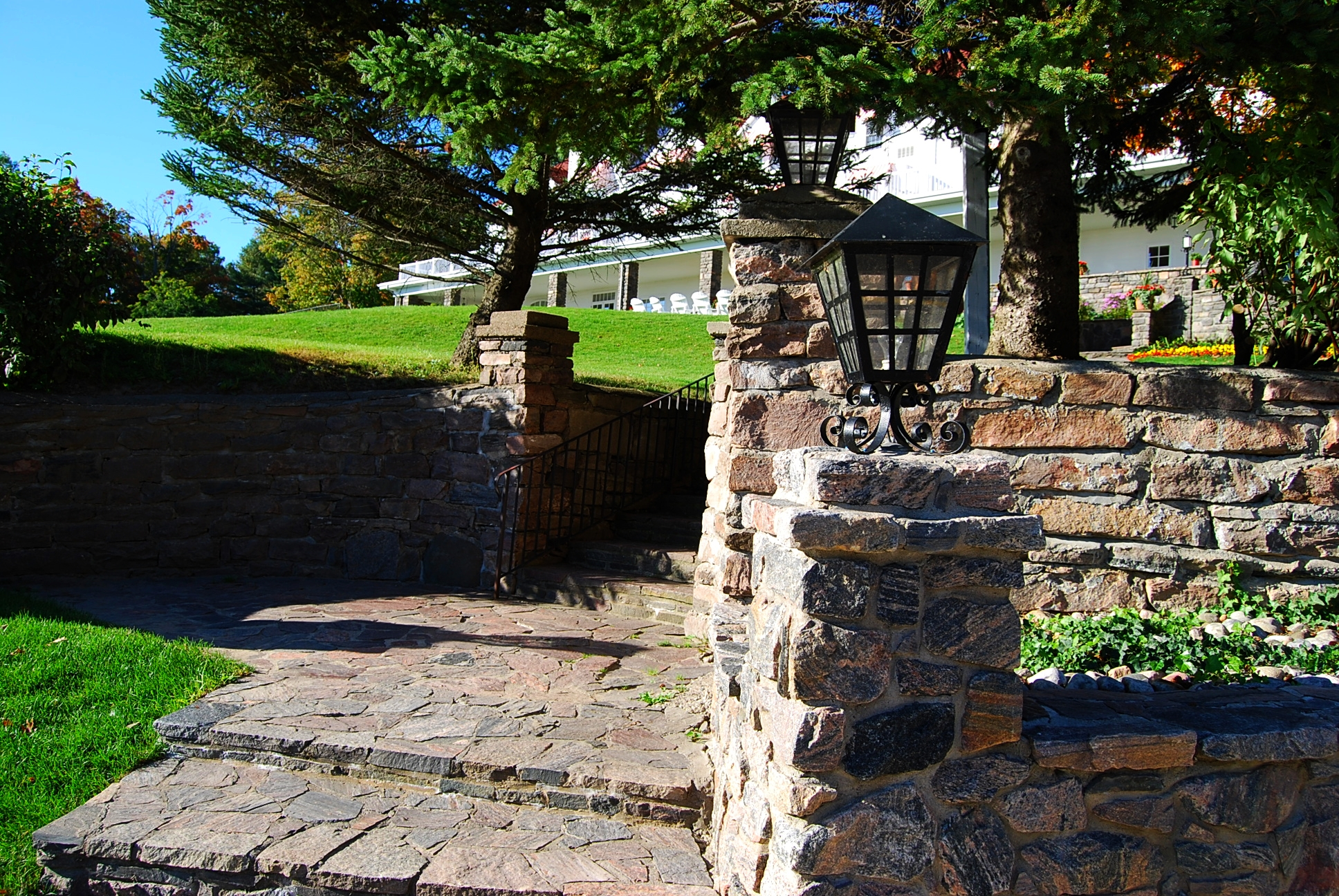
Granite Steps

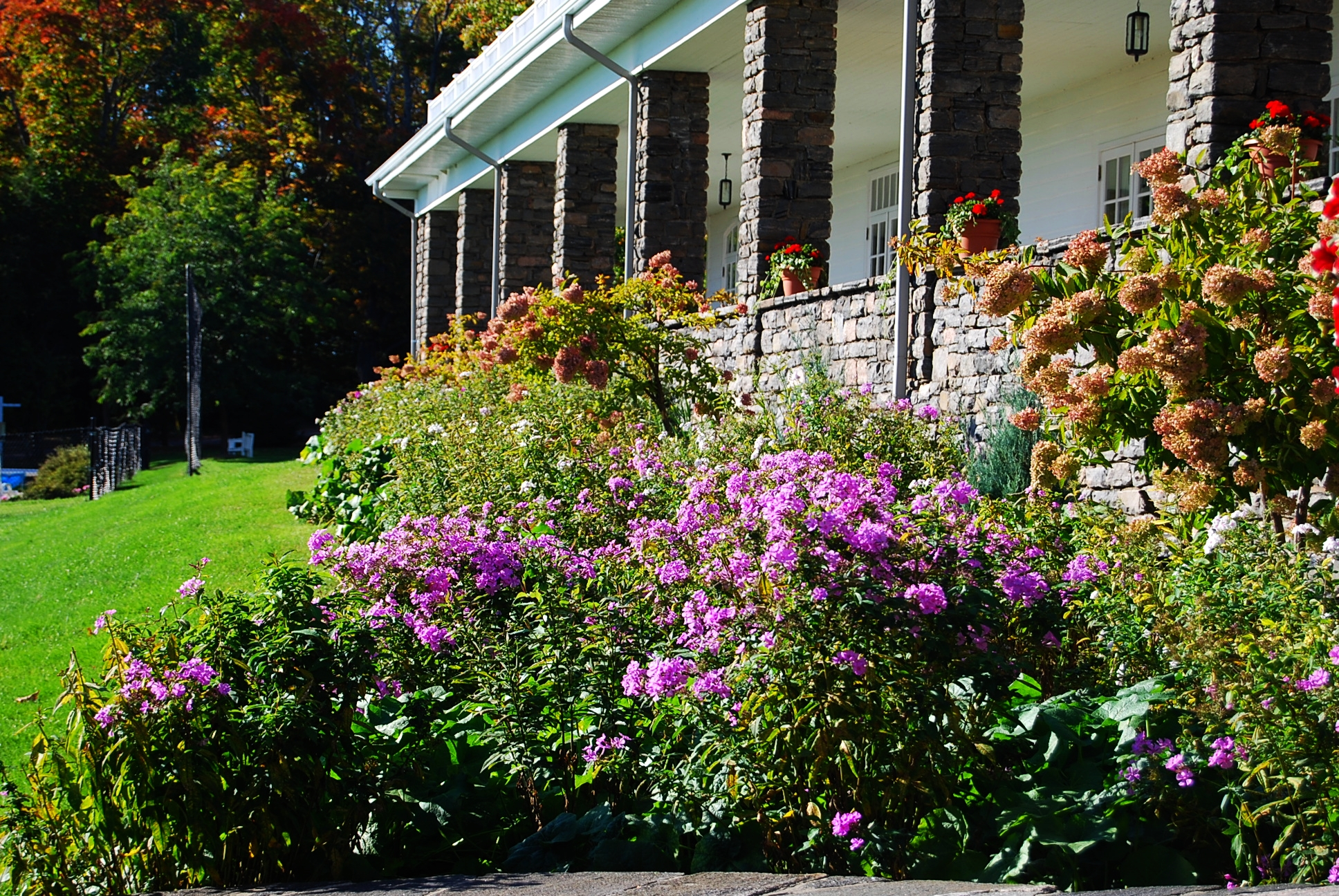
Flower Garden

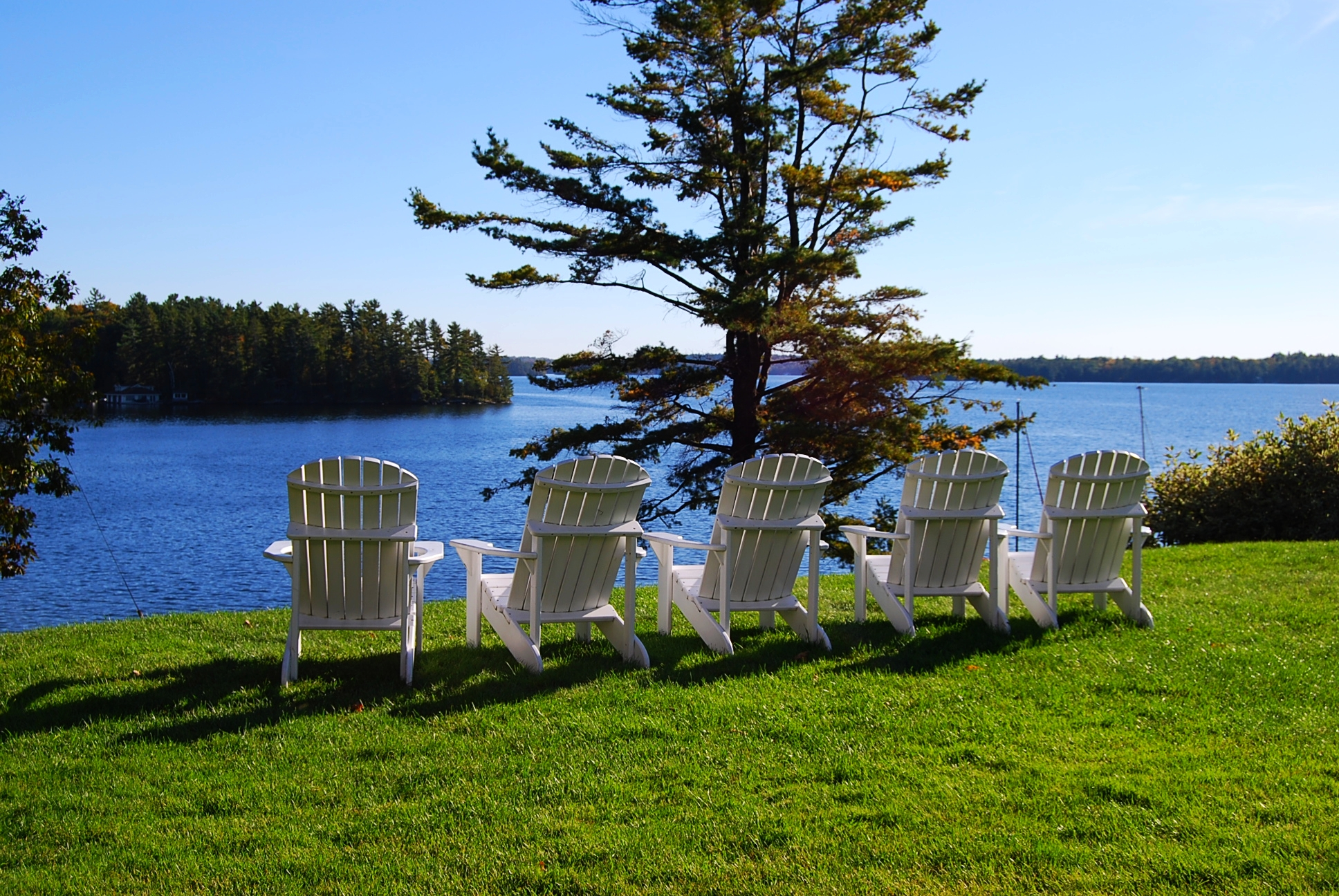
Lawn Chairs
