= SOV Windermere =

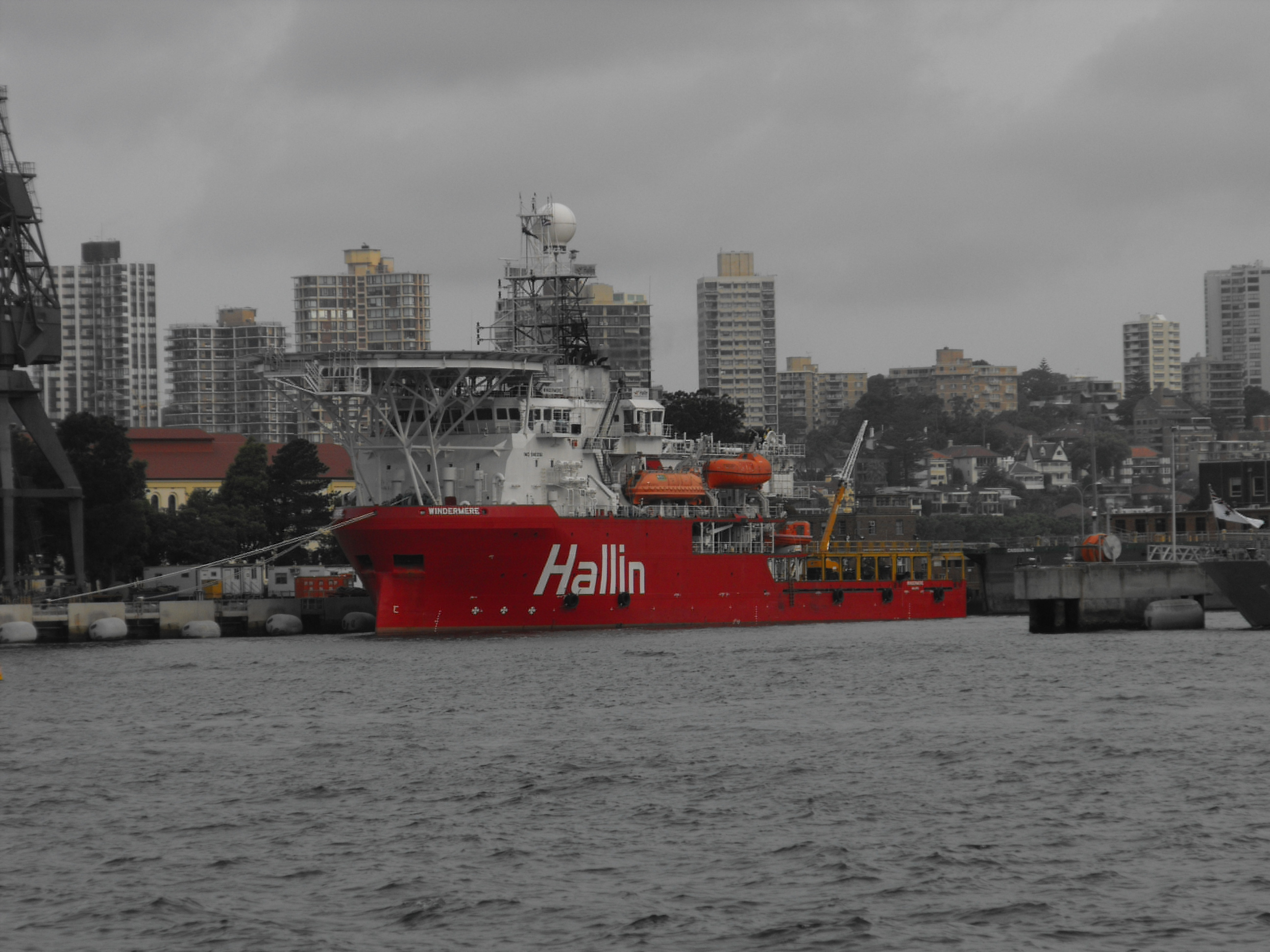
- SOV Windermere docked at Fleet Base East in November 2011

History
- Name: Windermere
- Owner: Hallin Marine
- Port of registry: Solomon Islands
- Launched: 16 December 2009
- Identification: IMO number: 9483061; MMSI number: 538003672; Call sign: V7SK7

General characteristics
- Tonnage: 4,750 GT; 1,425 NT
- Length: 80 m (260 ft)
- Beam: 20.4 m (67 ft)
- Draught: 8 m (26 ft)
- Propulsion: Diesel-electric, Voith Schneider propellers (2 x 2,500 kW)
- Speed: 12 knots (22 km/h; 14 mph)

SOV Windermere is a subsea operations vessel built in 2010 for Hallin Marine.

She was leased by the Royal Australian Navy to supplement its amphibious lift fleet from the 14 October 2011 to 31 January 2012. The option to extend the lease until the end of February 2012 was not taken up.
