= Windermere, Ascot =

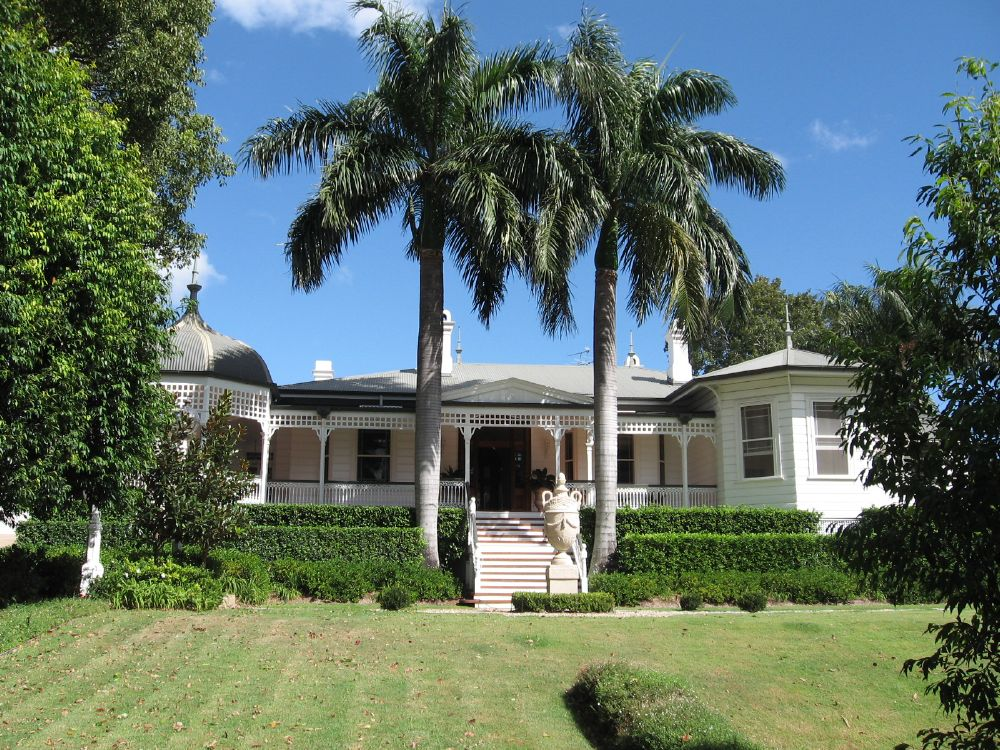
- Windermere, 2007

- Location within Queensland Location within Australia
- 27.4346°S 153.0623°E
- Location: 14 Sutherland Avenue, Ascot, Queensland, Australia

History
- Design period: 1870s–1890s (late 19th century)
- Built: c. 1886–1930s

Queensland Heritage Register
- Official name: Windermere
- Type: state heritage (landscape, built)
- Designated: 21 October 1992
- Reference no.: 600048
- Significant period: 1880s–1930s (fabric); 1880s–1910s (historical)
- Significant components: gate – entrance, fence/wall – perimeter, trees/plantings, tennis court, residential accommodation – main house

Windermere is a heritage-listed villa at 14 Sutherland Avenue, Ascot, Queensland, Australia. It was built from c. 1886 to 1930s. It was added to the Queensland Heritage Register on 21 October 1992.

== History ==
Windermere was built on land first alienated in 1855 by pastoralist James Sutherland. Sutherland owned many acres in the Toombul parish and land in the city. He worshipped at the Fortitude Valley Wesleyan Methodist Church to which he left an annual legacy when he died in 1875. Sutherland appears to have built a three bedroom dwelling on the site called "Hillside House". The house was rented in the late 1870s and in the early 1880s surveyor Henry St John Wood's address was Windermere. On Wood's taking up the position of government surveyor at Maryborough in 1885 the house became vacant.

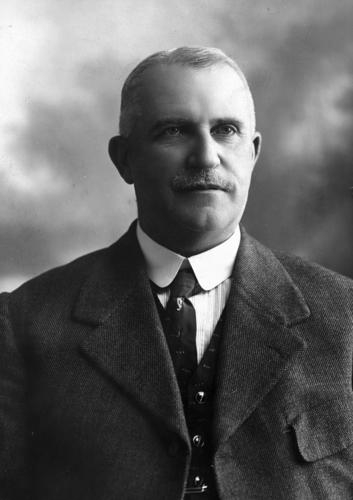
John George Appel

It is believed that Windermere was demolished and a new house was built for Sutherland's daughter Ruth and her husband solicitor John George Appel on the site c. 1886. The house may have been designed by architect Richard Gailey, although this remains unsubstantiated.

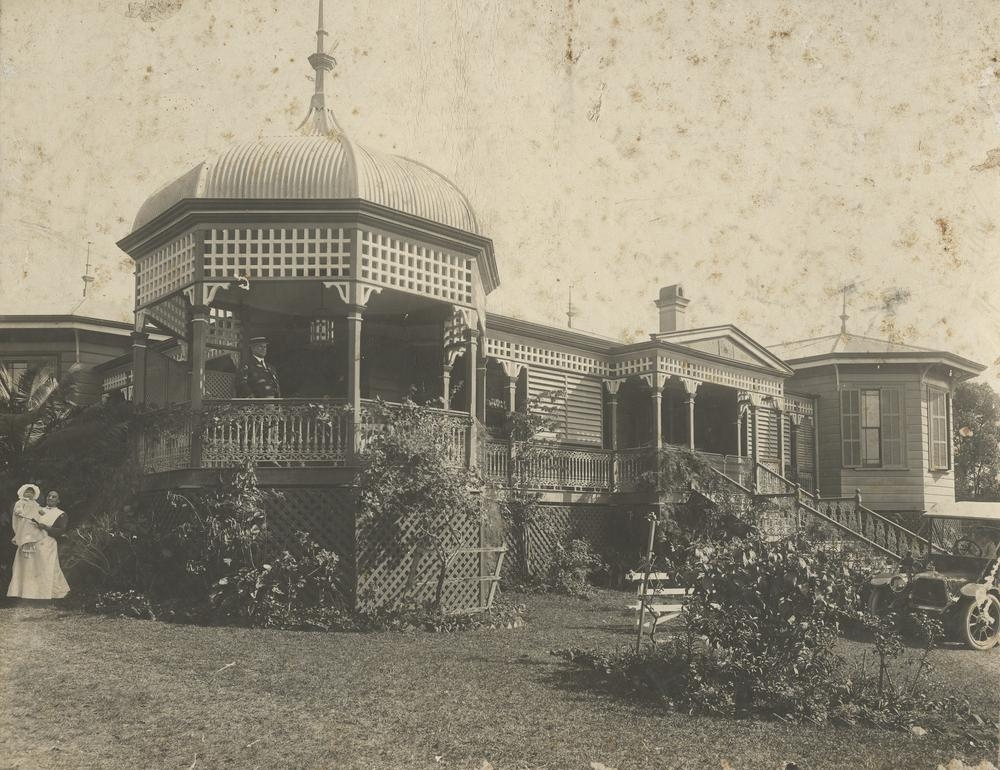
Windermere, circa 1900

John Appel married Ruth Sutherland in 1879, and shortly afterwards was admitted as a solicitor. He retired from practice around ten years later to become a pastoralist and politician. He was a member of the Hamilton Shire Council in 1890–1908, and was chairman twice: after Hamilton became a municipality he was twice mayor. Appel had farming interests in the Nerang area, and in 1902 he also became a member for six years of the Nerang Shire Council. Appel entered the Queensland Legislative Assembly as the member for Albert in 1908, and joined the ministry as Secretary for Mines and Public works, finding his true metier as Home Secretary in 1909, retaining this portfolio until 1915.

Windermere was owned by Charles Frederick White for five years from 1918, during which time it was rented. In 1923 it was the house was bought by George Kermode Jeffrey and his wife Lillian. During the 1920s the detached kitchen wing and servants quarters were demolished, and the eastern verandah enclosed.

From 1928 until 1967 the property was owned and inhabited by Dr Ellis Murphy and his wife Mary (daughter of Thomas Charles Beirne). Dr Ellis was a physician to the Brisbane General Hospital from 1938 to 1954, and part-time Professor of Medicine at the University of Queensland from 1950 to 1954. He was knighted in 1967.

In 1967 Windermere was purchased by Barbara and Trevor Cottee. In 1984 it was bought by Robert Geoffrey Bentley and his wife, and again sold in 1986 to Peter Maloney and wife. During the 1980s, the house underwent substantial modifications which included the reconstruction of the front stairs, the addition of a bathroom and study in the northern section of the house, the demolition of the rear laundry and bathroom, works to the rear of the house, and the re-decking of the front verandah. In 1994 the residence was bought by T & D Weeks, and extensive refurbishment of the gardens, rear wings, front verandah and interior was undertaken.

== Description ==
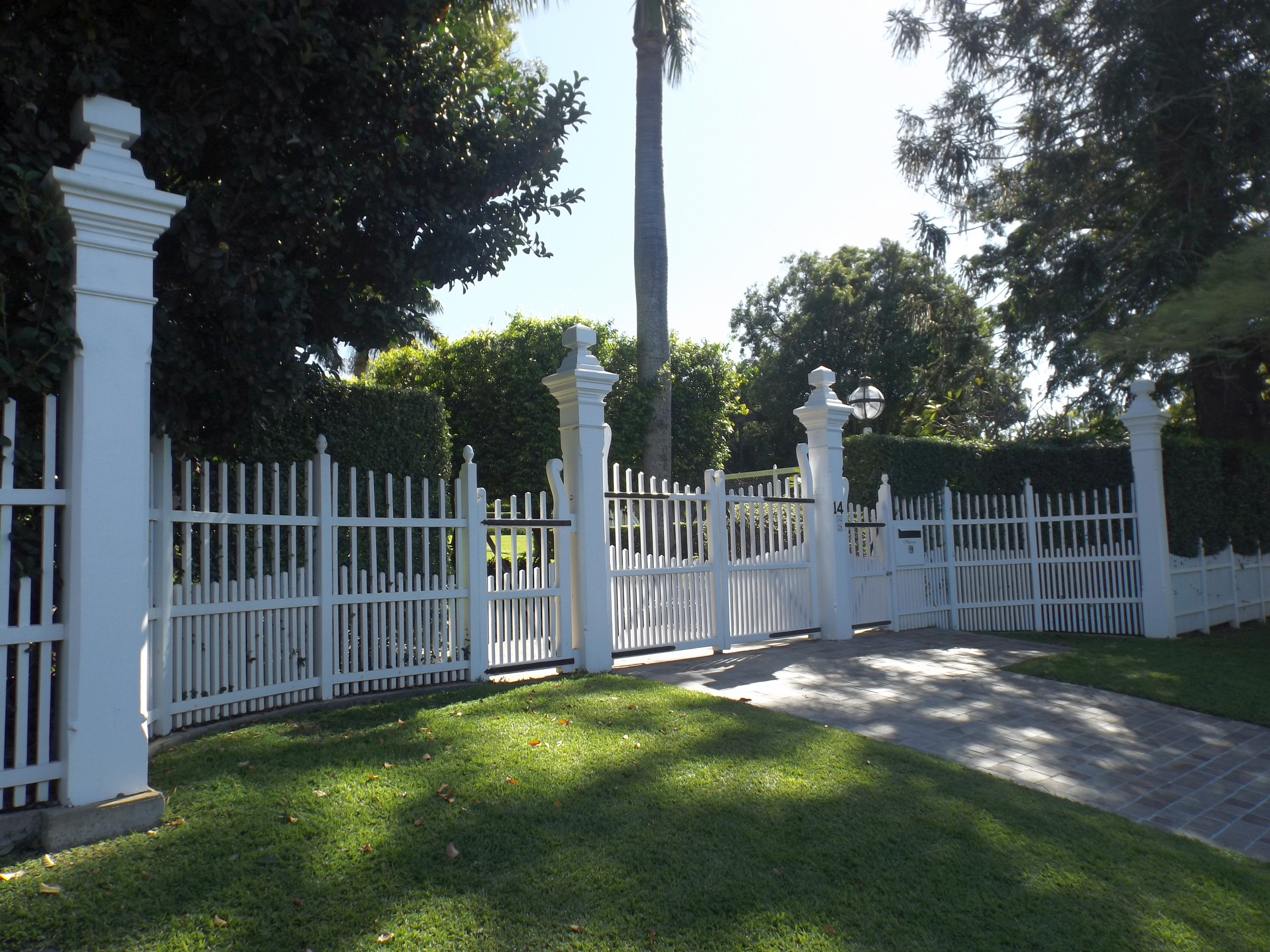
Gates, 2015

Windermere is a substantial picturesque single-storeyed chamferboard residence with corrugated iron roofs. The house sits on a rise and is set back from Sutherland Avenue, overlooking gardens which contain mature trees. The building and mature trees contribute to the Ascot townscape.

The building has been added to and altered over the years, but the core of the house and its principal frontage to the street remain substantially intact in form and detail. This core comprises a "public realm" of formal entertaining areas to the south, separated by a generous corridor/entry hall from a "private realm" of rooms for family use. The house also has two more recently added wings which extend out to the rear: part of the southern wing is a 1930s addition. The house has wide verandahs to the south and the east, which connect via a gazebo in the south eastern corner. A verandah to the north east is now partially enclosed. The house has multiple projecting bays: large faceted bays to the north-east and south-west, which project out beyond the main roof line; a bay to the north encircled by a faceted verandah; a small step-out bay to the north and two small faceted bays either side of the front entrance.

Externally, the house has picturesque and fine detailing. The large projecting bays have faceted roofs, battened eaves, shaped timber eaves brackets, and are crowned with tall finials. The verandahs have cast iron balustrades, chamfered timber posts with timber capitals, and mortice and tenoned lattice spandrels, curved timber valances, and timber-lined ceilings. The gazebo to the south east corner of the house has an ogee roof topped with a large turned finial. The base of the house is enclosed with lattice panels. The eastern (front) elevation has a central entrance stair which arrives under a projecting pediment supported on paired posts. The wide cedar entrance door is framed with sidelights and fanlights.

The "core" of the house has high timber lined ceilings, and timber lined floors and walls with picture rails throughout. The house contains fine detailing, including cedar joinery, etched and coloured glass windows, timber ceiling roses, mouldings and marble fireplaces with hand-painted tiles. The corridors have fine cedar arches with scalloped edges. The timber sash windows have frosted edging with patterned corners. Several fanlights also have coloured glass. Timber French doors open onto the verandahs.

The grounds contain some large mature trees, including bunya pines and camphor laurel. The Sutherland Avenue frontage has a finely decorated fence with substantial gateposts.

== Heritage listing ==
Windermere was listed on the Queensland Heritage Register on 21 October 1992 having satisfied the following criteria.

The place is important in demonstrating the evolution or pattern of Queensland's history.

Windermere is an excellent example of the type of home built for the prominent families during the 1880s boom period. It has a strong association with prominent Queensland politician/pastoralist John Appel, and notable Brisbane physician Dr Ellis Murphy. The picturesque residence and mature trees contribute to the Ascot townscape, and the residence contains fine internal detailing.

The place is important in demonstrating the principal characteristics of a particular class of cultural places.

Windermere is an excellent example of the type of home built for the prominent families during the 1880s boom period.

The place is important because of its aesthetic significance.

The picturesque residence and mature trees contribute to the Ascot townscape, and the residence contains fine internal detailing.

The place has a special association with the life or work of a particular person, group or organisation of importance in Queensland's history.

It has a strong association with prominent Queensland politician/pastoralist John Appel, and notable Brisbane physician Dr Ellis Murphy.
