= Gravenhurst =

Gravenhurst may refer to:

- Gravenhurst, Ontario, a town in Canada
- Gravenhurst, Bedfordshire, a civil parish in England
- Gravenhurst (band), a UK band
