= Windermere Hotel (Lake District) =

Hotel in Windermere, Cumbria, England

Coordinates: 54°22′50″N 2°54′14″W

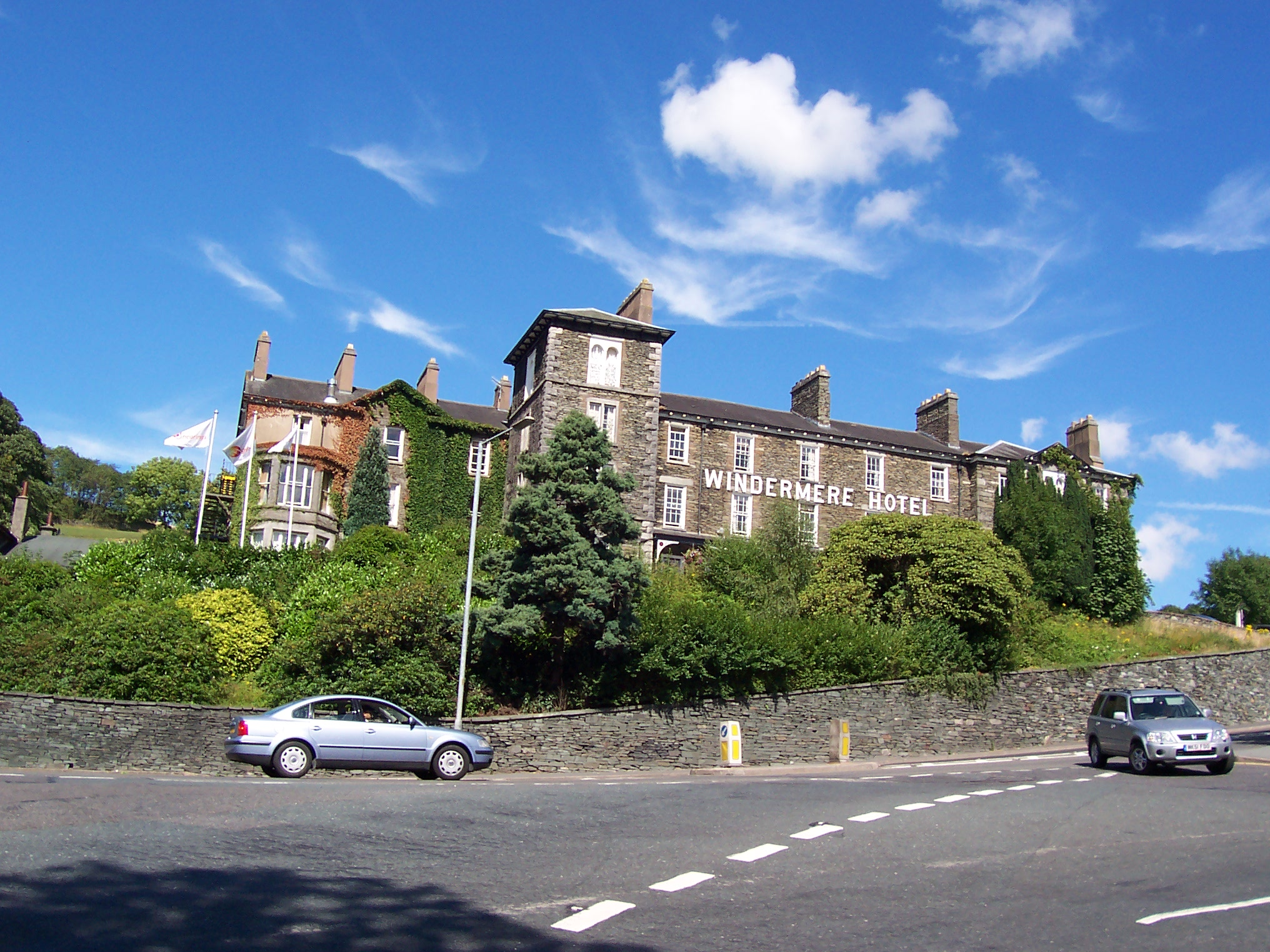
Windermere Hotel overlooking the A591 road

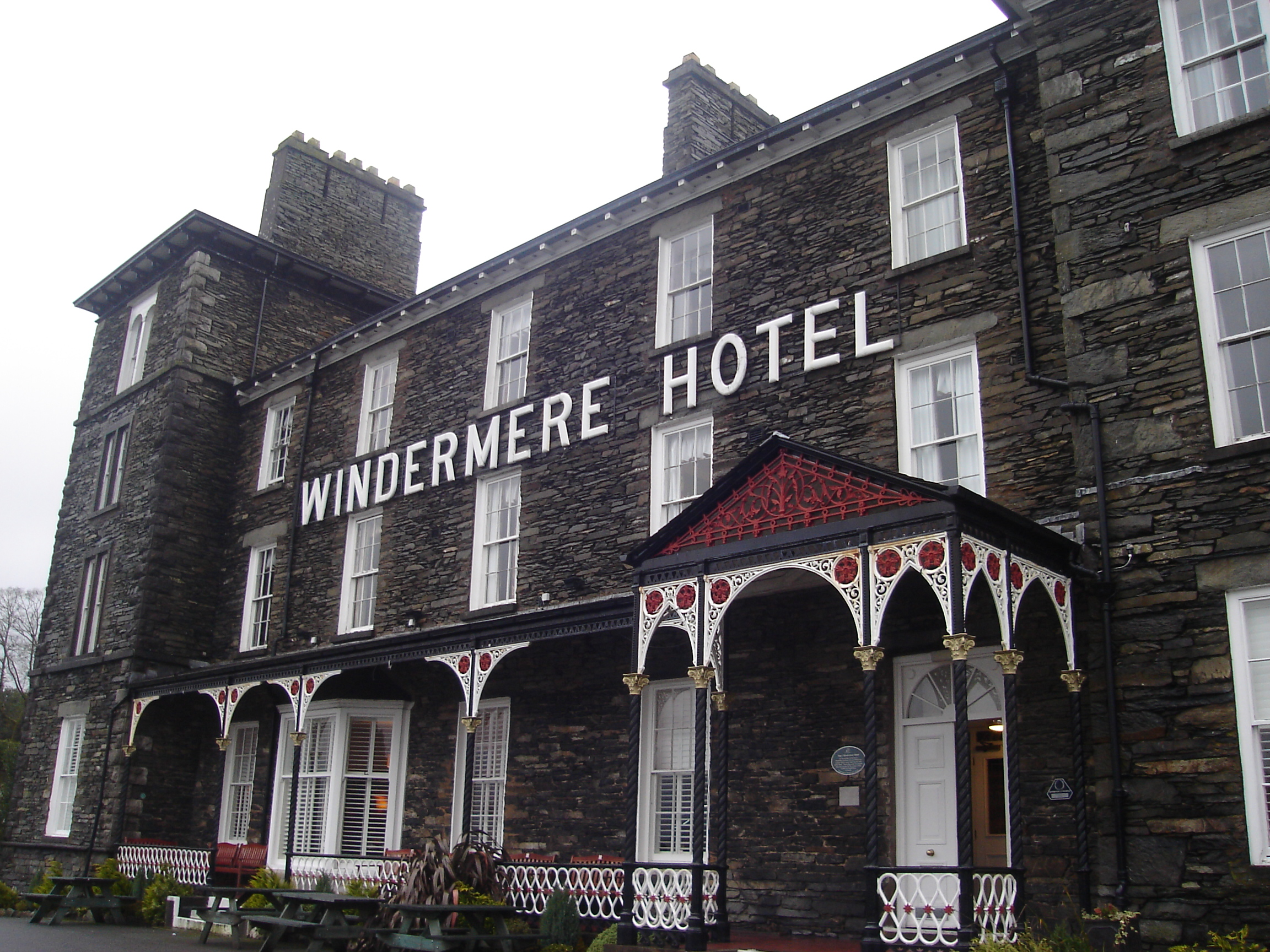

Windermere Hotel , originally The Riggs Windermere, is a hotel in Windermere, Cumbria, England, located near Windermere railway station. The hotel opened at the time that the railway link with Kendal was established in 1847. It overlooks the A591 road.
