= Bowness-on-Windermere =

Coordinates: 54.3644°N 2.9181°W

- Town
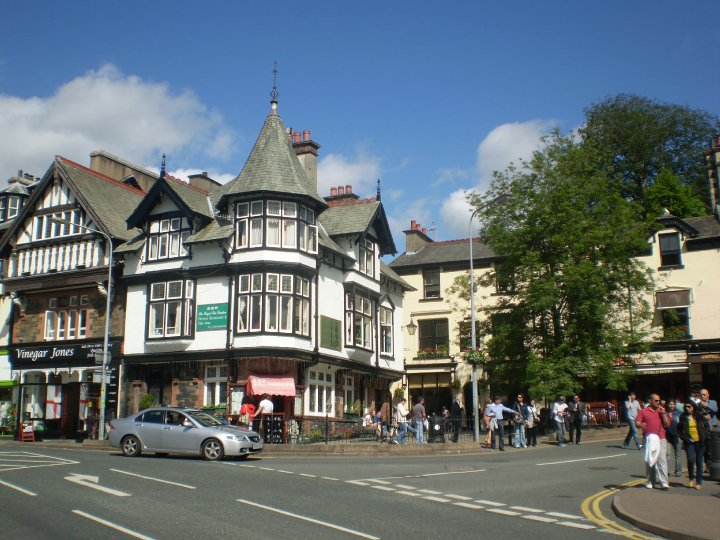
- Bowness-on-Windermere town centre

- Location in the former South Lakeland district Location within Cumbria
- Population: 2,250 (Built up area, 2021)
- OS grid reference: SD403969
- Civil parish: Windermere and Bowness
- Unitary authority: Westmorland and Furness
- Ceremonial county: Cumbria
- Region: North West
- Country: England
- Sovereign state: United Kingdom
- Post town: WINDERMERE
- Postcode district: LA23
- Dialling code: 015394
- Police: Cumbria
- Fire: Cumbria
- Ambulance: North West
- UK Parliament: Westmorland and Lonsdale

Bowness-on-Windermere is a town in Westmorland and Furness, Cumbria, England. It stands on the eastern shore of Windermere, the largest lake in the Lake District. It is 7 miles (11 km) west of Kendal. At the 2021 census, the Bowness-on-Windermere built-up area had a population of 2,250.

Historically in Westmorland, Bowness immediately adjoins the town of Windermere. The two towns have been administered together since 1905, and now form the civil parish of Windermere and Bowness.

The town's economy has long been tied to the lake. It was a small fishing village until the growth of tourism during the 19th century, aided by the arrival of the railway. Its tourist attractions today, other than the lake, include the World of Beatrix Potter, dedicated to the life of the children's author.

== Toponymy ==
'Bowness' (originally 'Bulnes') means " 'the headland where the bull grazes', from OE 'bula', 'bull' and OE 'næss', 'headland', perhaps referring to the keeping of the parish bull." The 'on-Windermere' part was added later (found on the Ordnance Survey map of 1899).

== History ==
The Bowness area anciently formed part of the township of Undermillbeck in the extensive parish of Kendal, which became part of Westmorland from the county's creation in the 1220s. Given the distance from Kendal, over 8 miles (13 km) to the east, a chapel of ease was built at Bowness in 1203. That chapel was demolished and replaced by the current St Martin's Church in the 1480s.

St Martin's Church

At the Reformation in the 16th century, St Martin's was made the parish church of a new parish called Windermere.

A grammar school was founded in about 1600. A new building was opened in 1836, funded by local landowner John Bolton of Storrs Hall. The foundation stone was laid by William Wordsworth.

During the 19th century, Bowness grew from a small fishing village to a town living almost entirely off tourism and holiday homes. It was the centre of the boat-building industry that provided the sailing yachts, rowing boats and steam launches used on the lake. A large number of hotels and boarding houses gave employment to the permanent population of the town. Queen Adelaide visited Bowness in 1840, staying at the Royal Hotel. The arrival of the railway in 1847 in Windermere (the residents of Bowness had opposed a station in their own town) provided much of the momentum for the growth.

== Governance ==
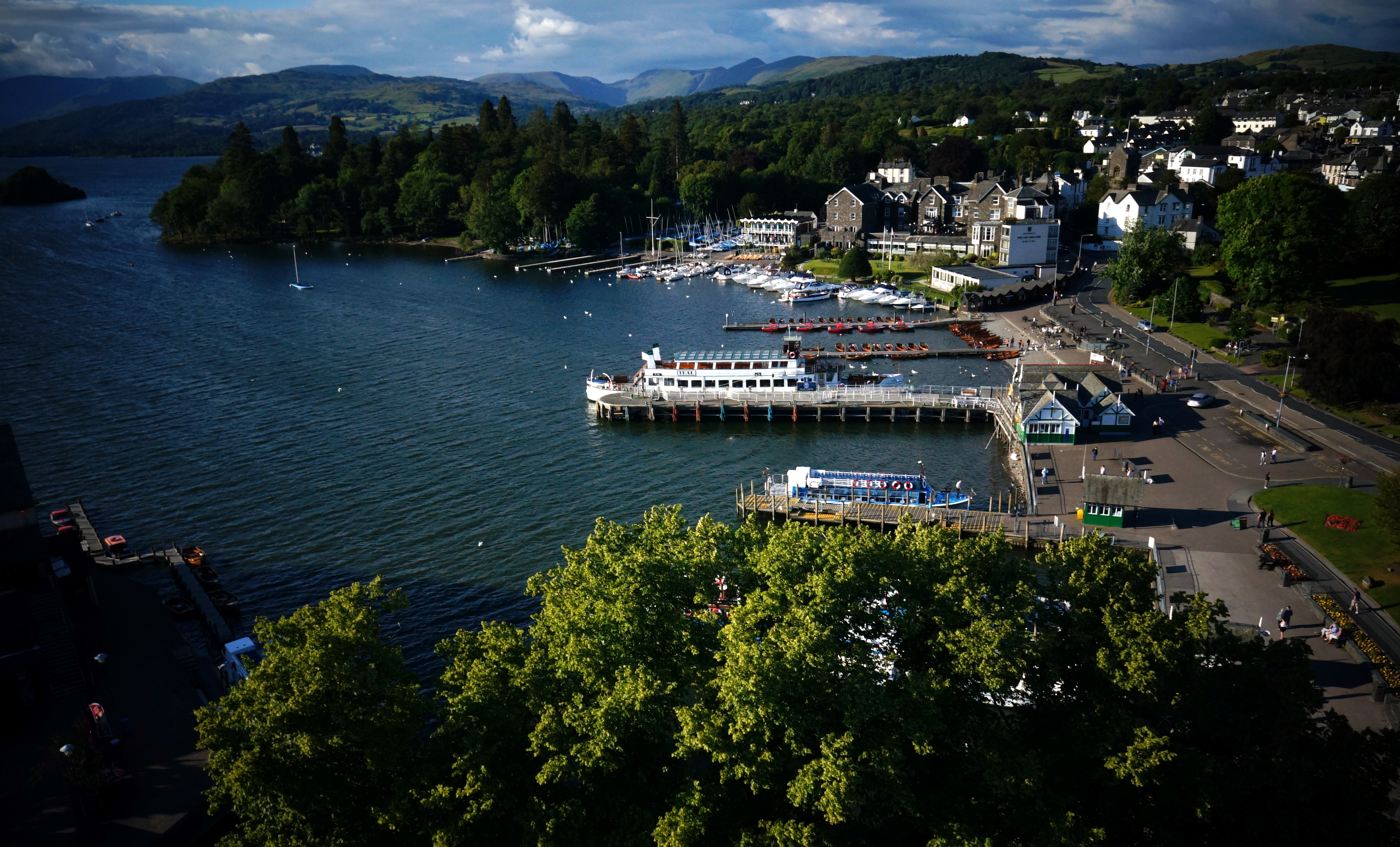
Looking northwards over Windermere

Bowness is one of the two towns in the civil parish of Windermere and Bowness. There are two tiers of local government, at parish (town) and unitary authority level: Windermere and Bowness Town Council and Westmorland and Furness Council. The town council is based at Langstone House on Broad Street in Windermere.

=== Administrative history ===
The parish of Windermere that was created from part of the ancient Kendal parish in the 16th century initially covered part of the township of Undermillbeck (which included Bowness), the whole of the townships of Applethwaite and Troutbeck, and part of Ambleside township. St Martin's Church at Bowness served as the parish church. From the 17th century onwards, parishes were gradually given various civil functions under the poor laws, in addition to their ecclesiastical functions. In some cases, including the parish of Windermere, poor law functions were exercised at township level rather than parish-wide. As such, each of the townships became civil parishes in 1866 when the legal definition of 'parish' was changed to be the areas used for administering the poor laws. The old Windermere parish also gradually fragmented into smaller ecclesiastical parishes.

In 1867, a Bowness local government district was created covering part of Undermillbeck township, administered by an elected local board. A separate district called Windermere had been created two years earlier in 1865 for the neighbouring new town that was growing up around Windermere railway station, which had opened in 1847 in Applethwaite township. Such districts were reconstituted as urban districts under the Local Government Act 1894.

The 1894 Act also directed that civil parishes could no longer straddle district boundaries, and so Bowness was removed from Undermillbeck parish to form its own civil parish. In preparation for the 1894 reforms, the outgoing Bowness Local Board asked for the name to be changed from just Bowness to Bowness-on-Windermere, which was granted.

Bowness-on-Windermere Urban District was abolished in 1905, when its area was absorbed into the neighbouring Windermere Urban District. Bowness-on-Windermere remained a civil parish within Windermere Urban District between 1905 and 1974, but as an urban parish it had no separate council. At the 1951 census (one of the last before the abolition of the civil parish), Bowness-on-Windermere had a population of 3,345.

Windermere Urban District and the civil parish of Bowness-on-Windermere were abolished in 1974. The area became part of the new South Lakeland district of the new county of Cumbria. A successor parish called Windermere covering the whole of the abolished urban district was created as part of the same reforms, with its parish council initially taking the name Windermere Town Council. In 2020, the town council formally changed the name of the parish to Windermere and Bowness.

South Lakeland was in turn abolished in 2023 when the new Westmorland and Furness Council was created, also taking over the functions of the abolished Cumbria County Council in the area.

== Transport ==
Windermere railway station offers train and bus connections to the surrounding areas, Manchester, Manchester Airport and the West Coast Main Line, and is about 1.5 miles (2.4 km) from the lakefront.

As of March 2026 Stagecoach offers the main services in the Lake District.

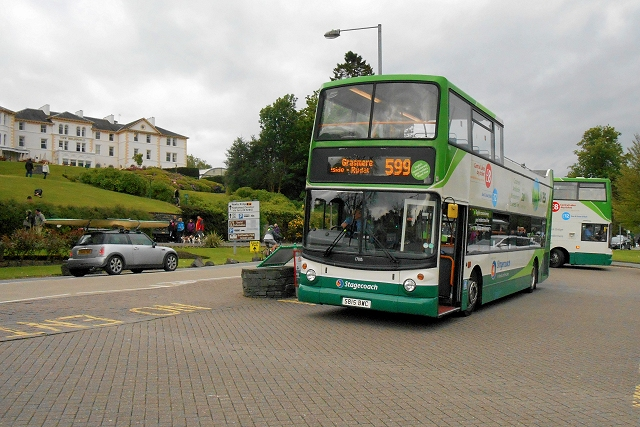
Some of the former open-top buses which ran the 599.

The council also runs wheelchair-accessible minibuses run around the edge of town.

The Windermere Ferry, a car carrying cable ferry, connects Bowness at Ferry Nab on the eastern side of the lake with Ferry House at Far Sawrey on the western side of the lake, a trip of approximately 10 minutes. For those looking for a more leisurely way to travel, Windermere Lake Cruises operate regular lake cruises running from Bowness Bay to the north end of the lake at Ambleside and south end at Fell Foot.

== Media ==
Local news and television programmes are provided by BBC North West and ITV Border. Television signals are received from the local relay transmitter.

Local radio stations are BBC Radio Cumbria, Heart North West and Smooth Lake District. Community on-line stations are Lake District Radio, and Bay Trust Radio.

The town's local newspapers are The Westmorland Gazette and The Mail.

Readers of Arthur Ransome's Swallows and Amazons series of books will recognise Bowness as the lakeside town of 'Rio'. The collection at the Windermere Steamboat Museum on Rayrigg Road includes TSSY Esperance, 1869; one of the iron steamboats on which Ransome modelled Captain Flint's houseboat. Bowness-on-Windermere is also home to The World of Beatrix Potter attraction, opened in July 1991 by Victoria Wood.

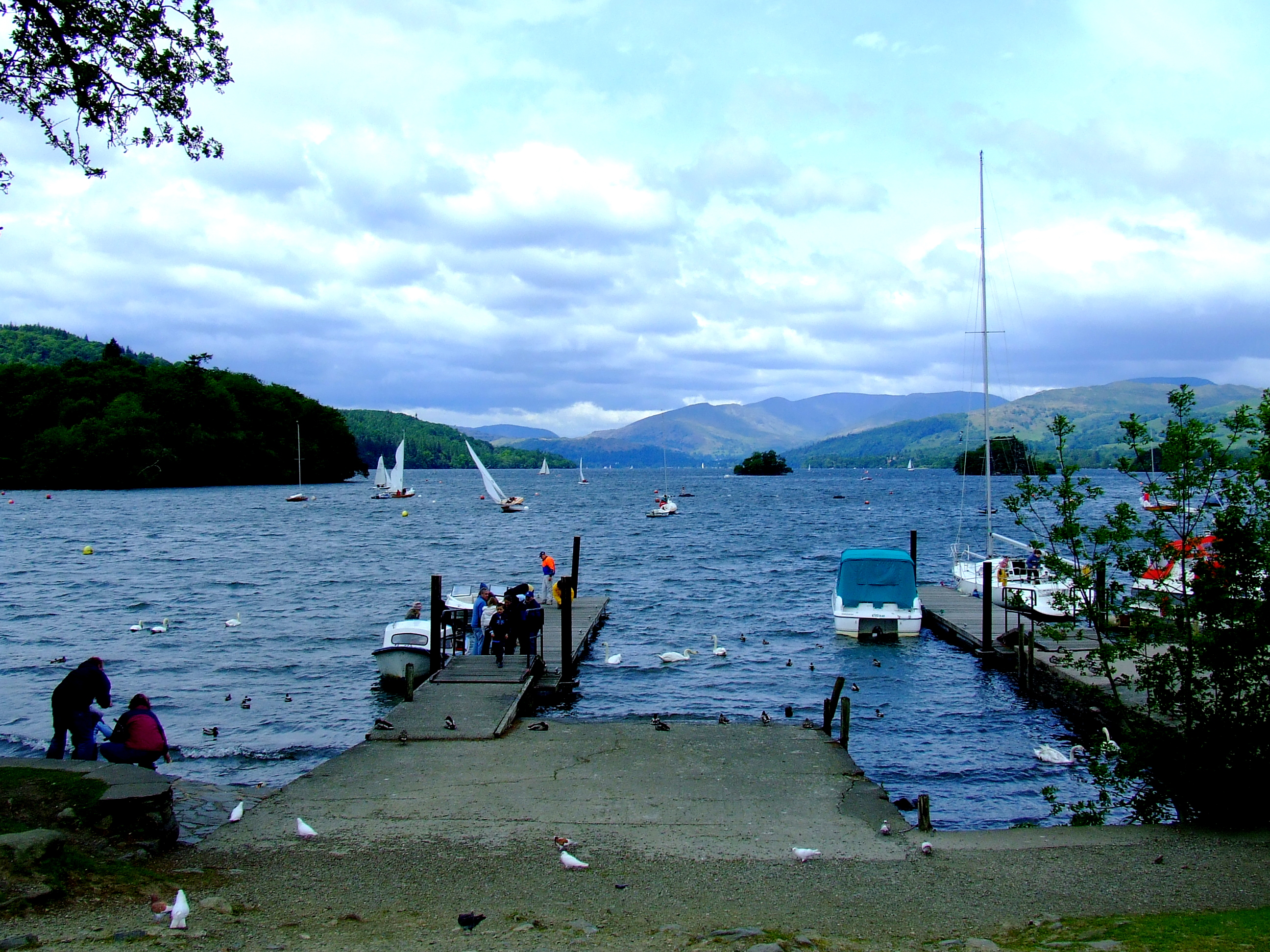
View of Windermere from Bowness-on-Windermere

== See also ==
- Listed buildings in Windermere, Cumbria (town)
