= Windermere, Cumbria (town) =

Town in Cumbria, England

Coordinates: 54.376°N 2.907°W

Windermere
- Town
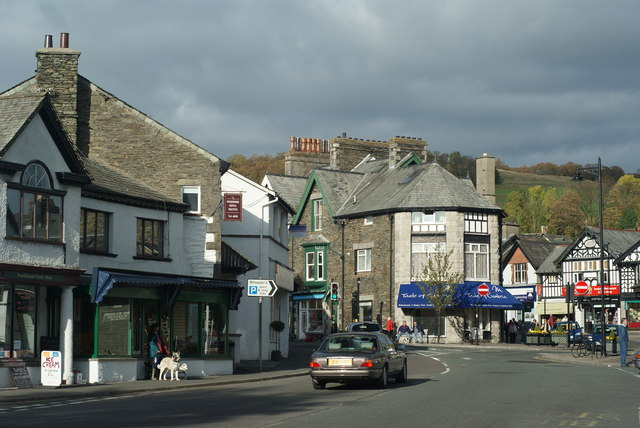
- Windermere town centre

- Location in the former South Lakeland district Location within Cumbria
- Population: 4,826 (2021)
- OS grid reference: SD4198
- Civil parish: Windermere and Bowness
- Unitary authority: Westmorland and Furness
- Ceremonial county: Cumbria
- Region: North West
- Country: England
- Sovereign state: United Kingdom
- Post town: WINDERMERE
- Postcode district: LA23
- Dialling code: 015394
- Police: Cumbria
- Fire: Cumbria
- Ambulance: North West
- UK Parliament: Westmorland and Lonsdale

Windermere (/ˈwɪndərmɪər/) is a town in Westmorland and Furness, Cumbria, England. Within the Lake District, the town lies about half a mile (0.80 km) east of Windermere, the lake from which it takes its name. In 2021 it had a population of 4,826.

While Windermere town does not itself touch the lake, it forms one urban area with the older town of Bowness-on-Windermere, which is directly on the lake shore. Windermere and Bowness together form a single civil parish.

Windermere began to grow when the railway station and hotel of the same name opened in 1847. Tourism is popular in the town, owing to its proximity to the lake and local scenery. Boats from the piers in Bowness sail around the lake, many calling at Ambleside or at Lakeside where there is a restored railway.

== History ==
Historically a part of the county of Westmorland, Windermere town was known as Birthwaite prior to the arrival of the Kendal and Windermere Railway, which stimulated its development. Windermere station offers train and bus connections to the surrounding area, Manchester Airport and the West Coast Main Line.

The geological formations around the area take their name from the town. They are called the Windermere Group of sedimentary rocks.

== Toponymy ==
The word "Windermere" is thought to translate as "Winand or Vinand's lake". The specific has usually been identified with an Old Swedish personal name Vinandr. The other possibility is for a Continental Germanic name Wīnand. The second element is Old English 'mere', meaning 'lake' or 'pool'. There is a reference to "Wynandermer" in 1396.

== Governance ==
Windermere was from 1894 to 1974 governed by an urban district council which in 1905 absorbed the former Bowness-on-Windermere UDC although Bowness remained a separate civil parish until 1974. Windermere UDC had slight boundary changes in 1934 and was abolished by the Local Government Act 1972 replacing it with South Lakeland District Council. At the 1961 census (one of the last before the merger of the parish of Bowness on Windermere), Windermere had a population of 6562. On 29 July 2020 the merged parish was renamed from "Windermere" to "Windermere and Bowness". In 2023 South Lakeland was abolished and merged into Westmorland and Furness unitary authority area.

== Transport ==
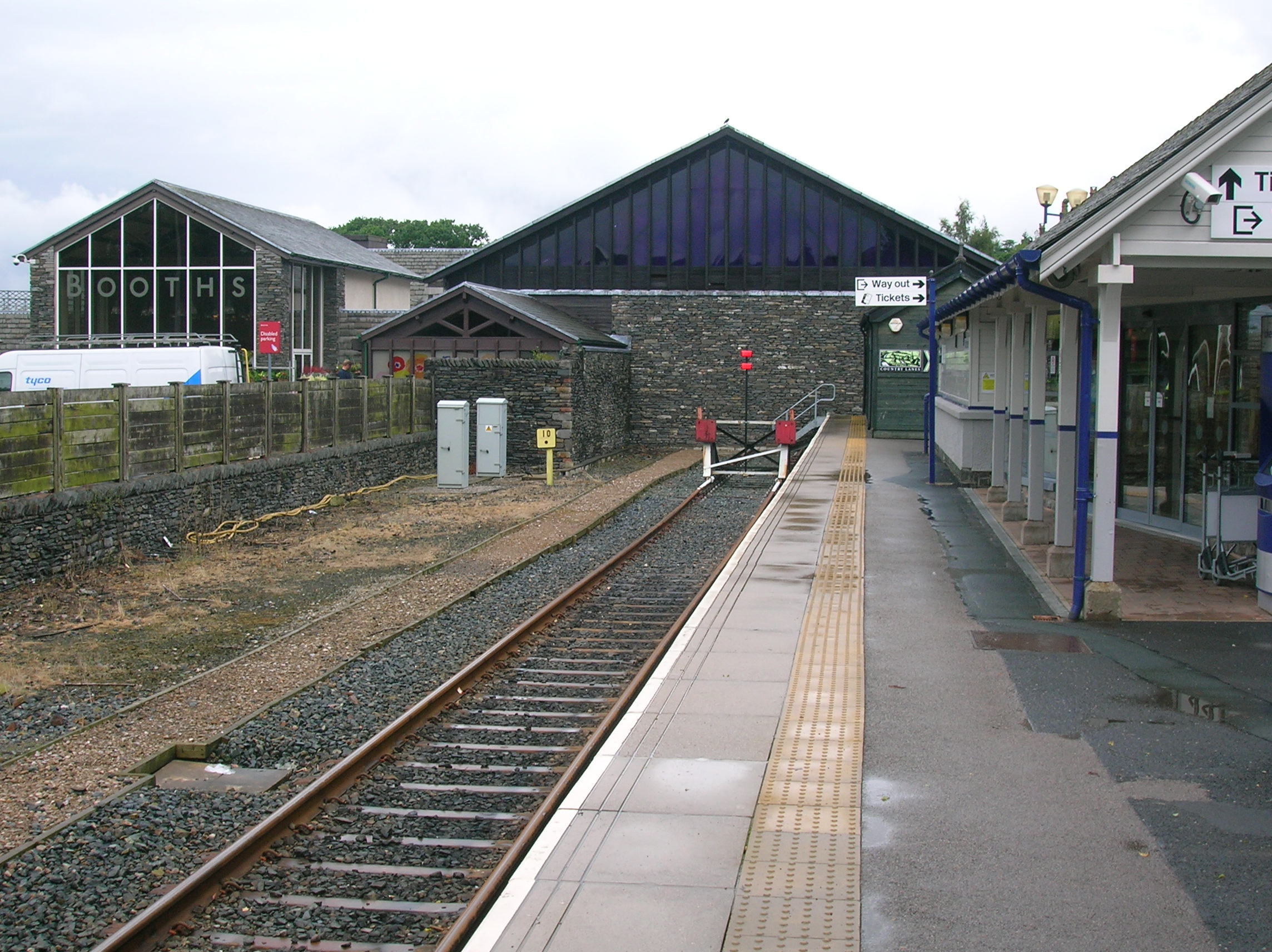
Windermere station in 2008. The Booths supermarket in the background has been designed to mimic the former trainshed and also incorporates the frontage of the original station

Windermere railway station was built in 1847 and was the reason the town was established. The station serves trains run by Northern to Oxenholme on the West Coast Main Line; some services continue on to Manchester Airport.

Stagecoach Cumbria and North Lancashire operates bus routes to Keswick, Kendal, Lancaster, Grasmere, Ambleside, Bowness-on-Windermere, Barrow-in-Furness, Penrith and Coniston.

The town is near the A591 road, a major road which runs through the Lake District from Kendal to Keswick.

== Local media ==
Regional TV news is provided by BBC North West and ITV Border. Television signals are received from the local relay transmitter.

Local radio stations are BBC Radio Cumbria, Heart North West, Smooth Lake District, and Lake District Radio that broadcast online from its studios in Kendal.

The town's local newspapers are The Westmorland Gazette and North West Evening Mail.

== Education ==
There are three primary schools located in the town. Secondary education is provided by The Lakes School (state) and Windermere School (independent, ages 2–18), both of which are located on the outskirts.

== Notable people ==
- George Godfrey Cunningham (c. 1802–1860) – Scottish writer
- Thomas Gardner (born 1996) – filmmaker.
- Dr David Clark, Baron Clark of Windermere, lives in Windermere.

== See also ==
- Bowness-on-Windermere
- Windermere
- Listed buildings in Windermere, Cumbria (town)
