= Simcox =

Simcox is a surname. Notable people with the surname include:

- A. J. Simcox, American baseball player
- Carroll Eugene Simcox, American Episcopal priest and editor of The Living Church magazine
- Chris Simcox, American co-founder of the Minuteman Civil Defense Corps (MCDC)
- Christopher Simcox, English double murderer
- Edith Simcox, British writer and feminist
- George Augustus Simcox, British classical scholar
- Grover Simcox, American illustrator
- Robert Simcox, American talk radio host
- Robin Simcox, incumbent Commissioner for Countering Extremism
- Tom Simcox, American former actor
