= Yousuf Bhailok =

British businessman (born 1956)

Yousuf Mohamed Ibrahim Bhailok
- Born: 1956 (age 69–70)
- Occupation: Businessman

Yousuf Mohamed Ibrahim Bhailok is a British businessman in Lancashire and the former general secretary of the Muslim Council of Britain. Bhailok made his money in property investments. In April 2016, it was reported that Bhailok was preparing a bid for parts of the former British Home Stores chain which was placed in administration earlier in April. Standing as an Independent Candidate in the 2024 General Election. Following a heavily advertised campaign, including billboards on vacant properties across Preston which received some backlash from the community, Yousuf Bhailok received 891 votes and thus as a result, lost his deposit.

Titles in Islam
Preceded by Iqbal Sacranie	Secretary-General of the Muslim Council of Britain; 2000–2002	Succeeded by Iqbal Sacranie
