= Joan Salter =

Belgian, American, and British Holocaust survivor

Joan Salter MBE
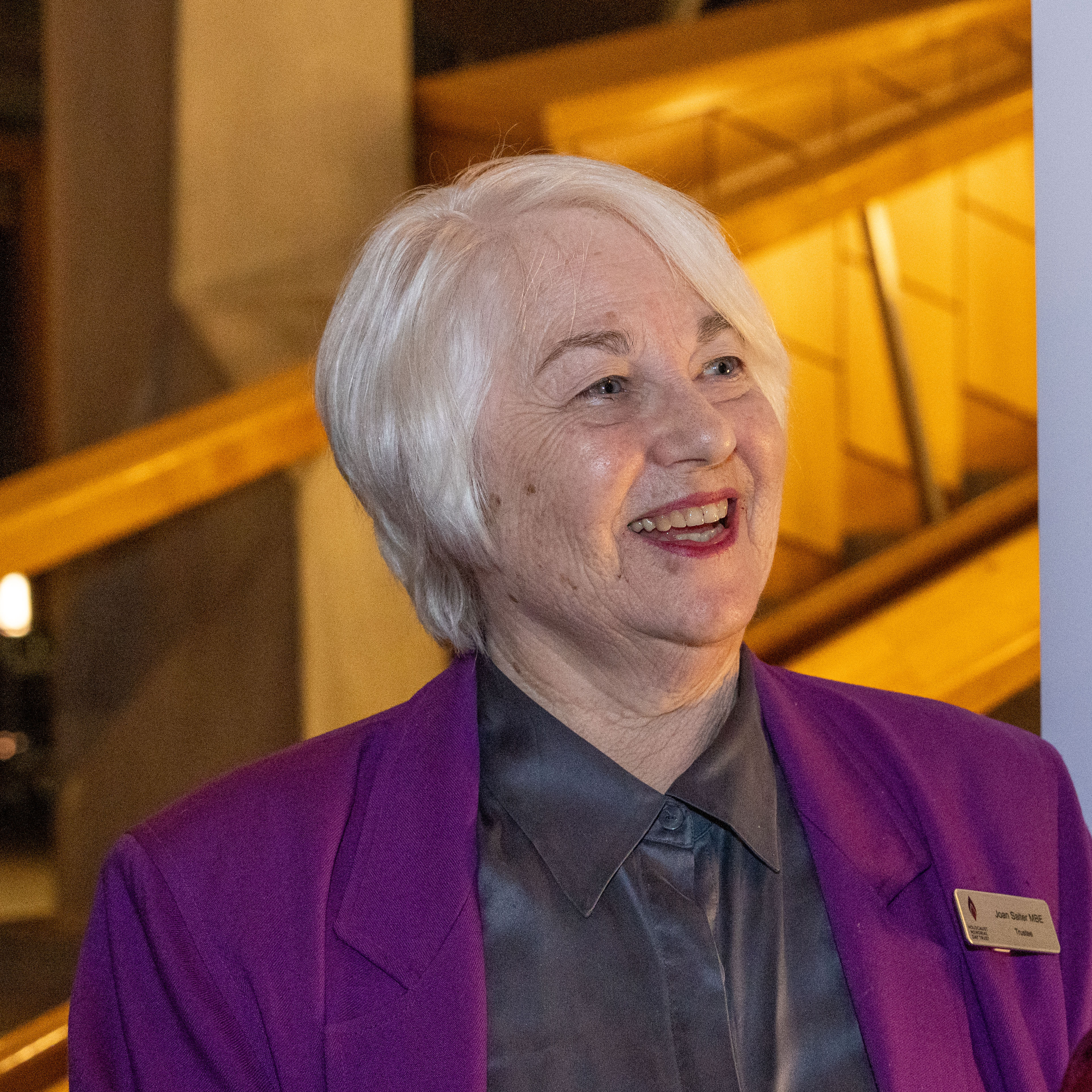
- Joan Salter MBE in 2026
- Born: Fanny Zimetbaum; February 15, 1940 (age 86); Brussels, Belgium
- Other name: Joan Farell
- Known for: Holocaust survivor

Joan Frances Salter MBE (born Fanny Zimetbaum, February 15, 1940; also called Joan Farell) is a Belgian, American and British Holocaust survivor. She escaped to the United States at the age of three, and returned to a reunited family whom she did not remember. She has spoken out against British politicians and given witness to children about her experiences.

== Biography ==
Fanny Zimetbaum was born on February 15, 1940, in Brussels, Belgium, the second daughter of Polish Jews who emigrated to Belgium in 1939 in hopes that Nazi Germany would not invade. Following the German invasion of Belgium in May 1940, Zimetbaum's father was deported and spent six months in prison. After Zimetbaum's father escaped and returned to Belgium, she, her mother, and her half sister obtained permission to move to Paris while their father lived in hiding nearby. In June 1941, all Jewish men living in Paris were ordered to be detained. Zimetbaum's father evaded the French police and fled to Lyon. The rest of Zimetbaum's family stayed in Paris until June 1942, requiring Zimetbaum's mother to go register with the French police weekly as a condition of living in France as an alien. The day before Jewish women and children living in Paris were ordered to be detained, her mother was warned by a police officer and the family arranged to be smuggled out of the city by members of the French Resistance. They rejoined Zimetbaum's father in a village outside Lyon.

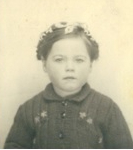
Fanny Zimetbaum aged three and a half

After Zimetbaum's father was arrested again and sent to a camp near the Swiss border, he escaped into Barcelona. Zimetbaum and the rest of her family followed in November 1942, but were captured at the Spanish border. Her half sister was sent to a Spanish convent and Zimetbaum and her mother were imprisoned. While in prison, Zimetbaum's mother learned that America was willing to take in Jewish children. Zimetbaum's mother decided to send her and her half sister to America. Zimetbaum and her half sister were transported by the Red Cross to the United States through Lisbon, Portugal, sailing on board the Serpa Pinto. Long after the ship left Portugal, Germans arrived by U-boat, boarded the ship, and detained the crew and passengers for nine hours. All passengers and crew were forced to take to lifeboats while the U-boat commander radioed Germany for a decision on whether or not to sink the ocean liner. The ship was searched, two Americans were detained, and three people were killed during the disembarking. The ship was allowed to continue, but the effect of the U-boat's interference caused concern.

On arrival in the United States, Zimetbaum and her half sister were separated and placed with different foster families. Fanny was taken in by the Farrell family. They renamed her "Joan" and treated her as their own daughter. In 1947, Joan was reunited with her birth parents, who had both survived the war and were living in the United Kingdom. She had no memory of her parents and struggled to adjust to life with them, travelling regularly to visit her American foster family over the next ten years.

== Legacy and honors ==
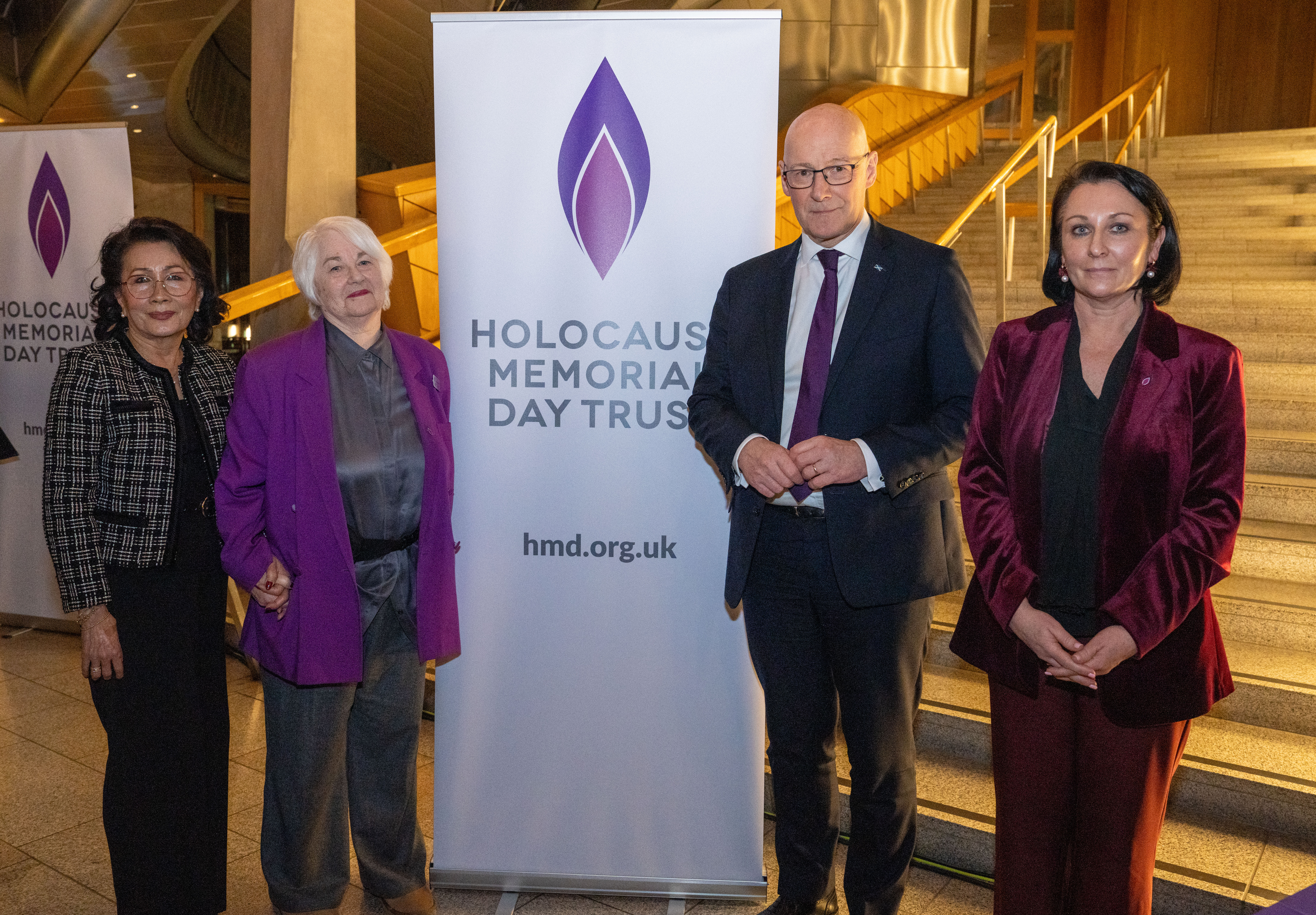
Var Ashe Houston and Joan Salter with Scotland's First Minister at a Holocaust Memorial Day Event in 2026

In adulthood, Salter educated others about her experience during the Holocaust. She has told her story at schools and colleges in the United Kingdom, and collaborated with organizations including the National Holocaust Centre and Museum and the Holocaust Memorial Day Trust. Salter has responded to political figures such as Prime Minister Rishi Sunak, who implied that the UK took in many Jewish refugees during the Second World War, by pointing out that programs such as the Kindertransport were exceptions to UK policy. Salter was filmed in 2022 challenging Home Secretary Suella Braverman over her use of the word "invasion" to describe the arrival of asylum seekers. Salter's words were defended by Freedom from Torture, who refused to delete a clip of the recording from the organisation's social media at Home Office request. Salter spent Holocaust Remembrance Day in 2025 at Wembley Stadium with visiting footballers as part of an initiative which introduced Holocaust survivors to young fans of the Premier League. In 2026 to commemorate Holocaust Memorial Day she was at the Scottish Parliament with Var Ashe Houston, a survivor of the Cambodian genocide.

Salter's suitcase, among other artefacts of hers, are part of the collection of the National Holocaust Centre and Museum in Nottinghamshire.

Salter was awarded an MBE in 2018 for services to holocaust education.
