= Sara Khan =

Sara Khan or Sarah Khan may refer to:

- Sara Khan (activist) (born 1980), British activist
- Sara Khan (actress, born 1985), Indian actress
- Sara Khan (actress, born 1989), Indian actress
- Sarah Mahboob Khan (born 1991), Pakistani tennis player
- Sara Ali Khan (born 1995), Indian actress and daughter of Saif Ali Khan
- Sara Raza Khan (born 1997), Pakistani singer
- Sarah Khan (born 1992), Pakistani actress
- Sara Khan, fictional character portrayed by Elnaaz Norouzi in the 2021 Indian TV series Chutzpah

== See also ==
- Saira Khan (born 1970), British television personality and celebrity
- Saira Khan (actress), Pakistani actress
- Zahrah S. Khan, British-Indian singer
- Zaara Hayat Khan, fictional character portrayed by Preity Zinta in the 2004 Indian film Veer-Zaara
