= Sara Khan (activist) =

English human rights activist (born 1980)

Dame Sara Khan DBE
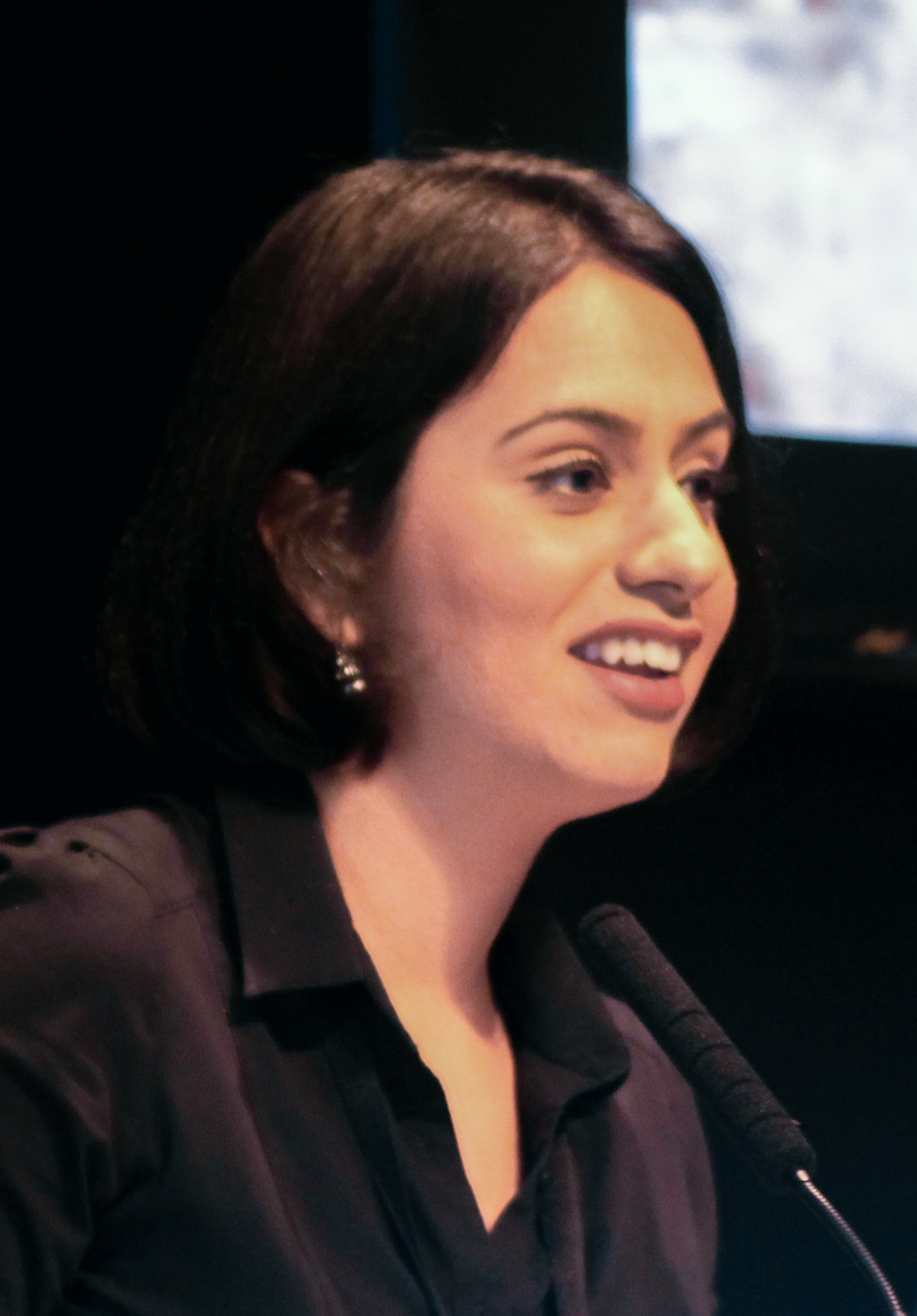
- Khan in 2017
- Born: January 1980 (age 46); Bradford, West Yorkshire, England
- Education: University of Manchester
- Occupation: Human rights activist

Dame Sara Khan DBE (born January 1980) is a British human rights activist and the chief executive officer of Inspire. She has been interviewed for the BBC's HARDtalk and Desert Island Discs.

== Personal life ==
Khan was born and raised in Bradford to immigrants from Pakistan. She worked as a hospital pharmacist and was president of an Islamic youth organisation before launching the Inspire charity in 2008, with the aim of challenging extremism and promoting gender equality.

Khan is married with two daughters, and resides in Hertfordshire.

== Professional life ==
Khan is the chief executive officer of Inspire.

Khan partnered with the Association of School and College Leaders to deliver training to headteachers and senior leaders about safeguarding pupils from extremism. At Inspire, she spearheaded the organisation's efforts in 2013 to challenge Universities UK's guidelines which advocated for gender segregation on Britain's universities. She penned a letter to young Muslim girls who may be considering to leave the UK to join ISIS after it emerged that three schoolgirls from Bethnal Green in London had travelled to Syria. The letter went viral and was widely reported in the press.

Inspire became a registered charity in 2017, named Inspire Women.

Khan is the co-author of the 2016 book The Battle for British Islam: Reclaiming Muslim Identity from Extremism.

In September 2005, after the London bombings, Khan sat on the Home Office's Tackling Extremism and Radicalisation Working Group. Following this she sat on the Department for Education’s Due Diligence and Counter-Extremism Expert Reference group headed by Lord Nash. Between 2015/2016, Khan gave evidence on the issue of radicalisation to the European Parliament's Committee on Culture and Education. She has also given evidence to the Home Affairs Select Committee's enquiry on countering extremism and to the Joint Committee on Human Rights which includes members from both Houses of the British Parliament.

In November 2016, Middle East Eye revealed that Khan had close links to the Research, Information and Communications Unit, which has been used by the Home Office to covertly create grassroots counter-extremism campaigns aimed at British Muslims

In January 2018, the Prime Minister, Theresa May, announced that Khan had been appointed Lead Commissioner for the Home Office's Commission for Countering Extremism. Former Conservative minister Baroness Warsi, Labour MP Naz Shah, the Muslim Council of Britain and others criticised the appointment on the basis that Khan would not be seen as independent by many in the British Muslim community; this was due to, amongst other things, her support for the Prevent programme. Warsi called Khan "a mouthpiece for the Home Office", while Shah said it was "a brilliant appointment for the Home Office but the worst appointment for such a critical role". The Prime Minister's office responded to defend the appointment. The following day, 100 Muslim organisations submitted a petition to the Home Office calling for Khan to be removed from the role.

In March 2015, she was named the 2015 Kraemer Middle East Distinguished Scholar-in-Residence, the Wendy & Emery Reves Center for International Studies and the Program in Comparative Legal Studies and Post-Conflict Peacebuilding at the William & Mary School of Law in Williamsburg, Virginia.

In 2015, Khan was included in BBC Woman's Hour Power list as one of the top ten influencers. In 2016, she won the Social and Humanitarian award at the Asian Women of Achievement Awards for her counter-extremism and women's rights work. In the same year, Marie Claire magazine named her as the recipient of its "groundbreaking activist" award of 2016.

Khan was appointed Dame Commander of the Order of the British Empire (DBE) in the 2022 New Year Honours for services to human rights and counter extremism.
