= Holocaust Memorial Day (UK) =

National event in the United Kingdom

Holocaust Memorial Day Trust logo

Holocaust Memorial Day (HMD, 27 January) is a national commemoration day in the United Kingdom, dedicated to the remembrance of the victims of the Holocaust, the genocide of European Jews by Nazi Germany during World War II. It was first held in January 2001, and has been on the same date every year since.

The chosen date is the anniversary of the liberation of Auschwitz concentration camp by the Soviet Union in 1945, the date also chosen for the International Holocaust Remembrance Day and some other national Holocaust Memorial Days.

In addition to the national event, there are numerous smaller memorial events around the country organised by many different organisations, groups and individuals.

Since 2005, Holocaust Memorial Day has been supported by the Holocaust Memorial Day Trust, a charity set up and funded by the UK Government. The current chair is Sajid Javid. In 2026 the CEO was Olivia Marks-Woldman OBE. The theme for Holocaust Memorial Day 2024 was "Fragility of Freedom".

Since 7 October 2023, participation by UK schools in Holocaust Memorial Day has dropped sharply, with the number of schools taking part falling by more than half compared with previous years. Figures cited by the Holocaust Memorial Day Trust show a decline from over 2,000 participating schools in 2023 to fewer than 900 in 2025, with many schools opting out amid heightened tensions and concerns about controversy in the classroom. Reporting has also noted that some educators feel increasingly cautious about addressing sensitive historical topics in the current political climate, contributing to the reduced level of commemoration. Jewish community leaders and education figures have warned that the decline risks weakening Holocaust education and normalising antisemitism, with some expressing concern that it may further marginalise Jewish pupils and contribute to a more hostile environment for discussions about Jewish history and Israel.

== UK event ==
Welsh Government's Holocaust Memorial Day Message 2021

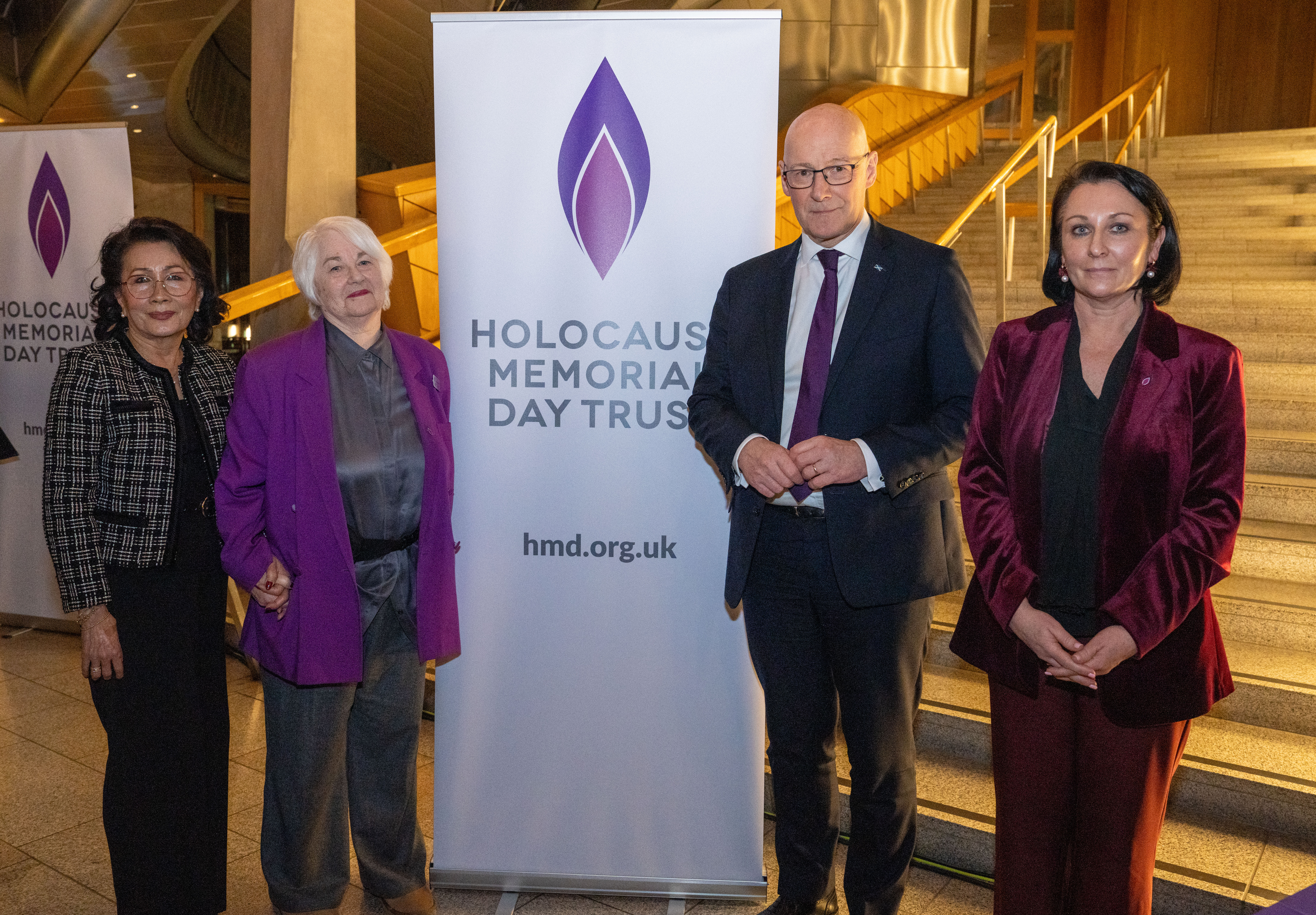
Holocaust survivor Joan Salter with Scotland's First Minister John Swinney at a Holocaust Memorial Day Event in 2026

Every year since 2001, there has been an annual national memorial to the victims of the Holocaust. The UK event has been hosted in:

- London (2001) – Theme: Remembering Genocides: Lessons for the Future
- Manchester (2002) – Theme: Britain and the Holocaust
- Edinburgh (2003) – Theme: Children and the Holocaust
- Belfast (2004) – Theme: From the Holocaust to Rwanda: Lessons Learned, Lessons Still to Learn
- London (2005) – Theme: Survivors, Liberation and Rebuilding Lives, for the sixtieth anniversary of the liberation of Auschwitz
- Cardiff (2006) – Theme: One Person Can Make a Difference
- Newcastle (2007) – Theme: The Dignity of Difference
- Liverpool (2008) – Theme: Imagine...Remember, Reflect, React
- Coventry (2009) – Theme: Stand Up to Hatred
- London (2010) – Theme: The Legacy of Hope
- London (2011) – Theme: Untold Stories
- London (2012) – Theme: Speak Up, Speak Out
- London (2013) – Theme: Communities Together: Build a Bridge
- London (2014) – Theme: Journeys
- London (2015) – Theme: Keep the Memory Alive
- London (2016) – Theme: Don't Stand By
- London (2017) – Theme: How Can Life Go On?
- London (2018) – Theme: The Power of Words
- London (2019) – Theme: Torn From Home
- London (2020) – Theme: Stand Together
- London (2021) – Theme: Be the Light in the Darkness
- London (2022) – Theme: One Day
- London (2023) – Theme: Ordinary People
- London (2024) – Theme: Fragility of Freedom
- London (2025) – Theme: For a Better Future

In 2026 the theme was "Bridging Generations".

For Holocaust Memorial Day 2020, Chief Rabbi Ephraim Mirvis, the Archbishop of Canterbury Justin Welby and Senior Imam Qari Asim jointly authored a prayer intended for use by people of all faiths at HMD activities, emphasising remembrance and unity against hatred and prejudice.

== Holocaust Memorial Day 2017 ==
As preparations began to mark Holocaust Memorial Day 2017, the BBC's Antiques Roadshow, broadcast on 15 January 2017, was a special Holocaust Memorial programme that included many precious objects from Holocaust victims and survivors.

== Holocaust Memorial Day 2016 ==
The UK Commemorative Ceremony for HMD was broadcast by the BBC. Participants included Robert Lindsay, Emilia Fox, Freddie Fox, Naomie Harris, David Olusoga, Dame Kristin Scott Thomas and Kevin Whately. Music throughout the ceremony was provided by a diverse range of acts including Darfuri singer Shurooq Abu el Nas, the Choir of Clare College Cambridge, the London Klezmer Quartet and violinist Jennifer Pike. Survivors and their experiences were central to the ceremony and survivors made up a significant part of the audience.

A special reception for survivors and refugees took place a week before the ceremony at the Speaker's House at the Houses of Parliament.

== Holocaust Memorial Day 2015 ==
=== UK Commemorative Ceremony ===
The UK Commemorative Ceremony for HMD was broadcast by the BBC, attracting 1.3 million viewers. Participants included now King, then Charles, Prince of Wales and his wife current Queen, then Camilla, Duchess of Cornwall, the UK Prime Minister, the Deputy Prime Minister and the Leader of the Opposition; the Chief Rabbi and the Archbishop of Canterbury; and actors Adrian Lester, John Hurt, Michael Palin, Keeley Hawes, Sarah Lancashire, Christopher Eccleston, and Laurence Fox. Survivors and their experiences were central to the ceremony and survivors made up a significant part of the audience.

The ceremony was preceded by a special reception for survivors and refugees. Guests at the reception included the Prince of Wales and Duchess of Cornwall, the three main Westminster party leaders, the Archbishop of Canterbury, celebrity contributors to the ceremony and members of the Prime Minister's Holocaust Commission.

=== Memory Makers project ===
Eight artists took part in the Memory Makers art project by producing pieces of art in response to meeting Holocaust and genocide survivors. Artists and survivors who took part in the project included:

- Stephen Fry met with survivor of Auschwitz Anita Lasker-Wallfisch
- Filmmaker and animator Gemma Green-Hope met Auschwitz survivor Ivor Perl
- Collage artist and animator Martin O'Neill met Holocaust survivor Bettine Le Beau
- Severely visually impaired illustrator Kimberley Burrows met Holocaust survivor Sabina Miller
- Filmmaker Debs Paterson met Holocaust survivor Janine Webber
- Poet Sarah Hesketh met Holocaust survivor Eve Kugler
- Ceramicist Clare Twomey met with Nisad 'Šiško' Jakupović, who survived the notorious Omarska concentration camp during the Bosnian War. Twomey's Humanity is in our Hands project asked members of the public what human qualities they believe allow society to flourish. The resulting artwork will be showcased as part of Holocaust Memorial Day 2016.

=== Moving Portraits ===
A series of Moving Portraits of Holocaust and genocide survivors screened on big screens in cities across the UK, projected onto London's Royal Festival Hall, and used in dozens of local HMD commemorations.

=== 70 candles for 70 years with Sir Anish Kapoor ===
Sir Anish Kapoor designed 70 special commemorative candles, which were lit at 70 HMD activities around the UK, demonstrating the breadth and diversity of the commemorations in every part of the country. Six candles were lit at the UK Commemorative Ceremony to represent the six million Jews murdered in the Holocaust and a candle was taken to Auschwitz Birkenau by Eric Pickles, Secretary of State for Communities and Local Government.

== Holocaust Memorial Day event in Parliament 2010 ==
In 2010, Labour MP Jeremy Corbyn appeared at an event at the Houses of Parliament in which the main speaker, Hajo Meyer, a Jewish survivor of the Auschwitz concentration camp, compared Israel's treatment of Palestinians in Gaza with the Holocaust.

The event was criticised by Jon Benjamin, Board of Deputies chief executive, who said: "This latest attempt to exploit the most painful chapter in Jewish history in order to berate and demonise Israel is among the most despicable." One audience member, the Holocaust survivor Rubin Katz, said that "the room was brimming with raging hatred, directed at Israel and Jews."

One eye-witness criticised "the hounding of 85-year old Dr. Meyer, and the bellows of ‘boring!’ every time any survivor of a different genocide tried to tell about their experience." Eye-witnesses said that another pro-Israel protester shouted "Sieg Heil" and gave a Nazi salute.

In 2018, when he was asked about his involvement with the meeting, Corbyn said that "Views were expressed at the meeting which I do not accept or condone. In the past, in pursuit of justice for the Palestinian people and peace in Israel/Palestine, I have on occasion appeared on platforms with people whose views I completely reject."

== History ==
Since 1996, 27 January has officially been Gedenktag für die Opfer des Nationalsozialismus (Day of Remembrance for the Victims of National Socialism) in Germany. Italy and Poland have adopted similar memorial days.

On 10 June 1999, Andrew Dismore MP asked Prime Minister Tony Blair about the creation of memorial day for the Holocaust. In reply, Tony Blair also referred to the ethnic cleansing that was being witnessed in the Kosovo War at that time and said:

I am determined to ensure that the horrendous crimes against humanity committed during the Holocaust are never forgotten. The ethnic cleansing and killing that has taken place in Europe in recent weeks are a stark example of the need for vigilance.

A consultation took place during October of that year. On 27 January 2000, representatives from forty-four governments around the world met in Stockholm to discuss Holocaust education, remembrance and research. At the conclusion of the forum, the delegates unanimously signed a declaration. This declaration forms the basis of the Statement of Commitment (see below) adopted for Holocaust Memorial Day.

In 2005 the United Nations voted, by 149 votes out of 191, to formally commemorate the Holocaust.

The current patron of the charity is Charles III, who succeeded his mother Elizabeth II as patron in July 2015.

== Statement of Commitment for Holocaust Memorial Day in the UK ==
The statement of commitment for HMD in the UK was created after the Stockholm Declaration was agreed. It is a simplified version of the Stockholm Declaration, and includes a commitment to remember all victims of Nazi Persecution, and victims of all genocides. Many HMD activity organisers use this by arranging for participants to read from as part of their activity.

1. We recognise that the Holocaust shook the foundations of modern civilisation. Its unprecedented character and horror will always hold universal meaning.
2. We believe the Holocaust must have a permanent place in our nation's collective memory. We honour the survivors still with us, and reaffirm our shared goals of mutual understanding and justice.
3. We must make sure that future generations understand the causes of the Holocaust and reflect upon its consequences. We vow to remember the victims of Nazi persecution and of all genocide.
4. We value the sacrifices of those who have risked their lives to protect or rescue victims, as a touchstone of the human capacity for good in the face of evil.
5. We recognise that humanity is still scarred by the belief that race, religion, disability or sexuality make some people's lives worth less than others'. Genocide, antisemitism, racism, xenophobia and discrimination still continue. We have a shared responsibility to fight these evils.
6. We pledge to strengthen our efforts to promote education and research about the Holocaust and other genocide. We will do our utmost to make sure that the lessons of such events are fully learnt.
7. We will continue to encourage Holocaust remembrance by holding an annual Holocaust Memorial Day. We condemn the evils of prejudice, discrimination and racism. We value a free, tolerant, and democratic society.

== Criticism ==
=== Muslim Council of Britain ===
Between 2001 and 2007, the Muslim Council of Britain (MCB) expressed its unwillingness to attend the ceremony. The MCB instead called for a more inclusive day proposing the commemoration of deaths in Palestine, Rwanda and the former Yugoslavia, along with the Holocaust. In 2005 the then General Secretary of the MCB, Iqbal Sacranie, suggested that the deaths of Palestinians should also be remembered.

On 3 December 2007, the MCB voted to end the boycott. Assistant General Secretary Inayat Bunglawala argued it was 'inadvertently causing hurt to some in the Jewish community'. However, the MCB renewed their boycott for the 2009 commemoration, in reaction to the 2008–2009 conflict in Gaza. Despite initially refusing to confirm whether or not they would take part in the 2010 commemoration, they eventually voted to send a junior representative, Shuja Shafi, to attend the event in London.

=== Armenians ===
The event also drew similar criticism in 2000 from the United Kingdom's Armenian community, who complained that the event remained exclusively for commemorating those who perished in the Holocaust, and not the Armenian genocide. Neil Frater, an official from Tony Blair's Race Equality Unit, a branch of the Home Office, replied that it had consulted the Holocaust Memorial Day Steering Group on the issue and had agreed that while it understood that the Armenian Genocide was an "appalling tragedy", it wanted to "avoid the risk of the message becoming too diluted if we try to include too much history." Frater went on to say that it had gone on with the Steering Group's advice to reject commemorating the Genocide. His comments were received with even more criticism. Zaven Messerlian, the principal of the Armenian Evangelical College in Beirut, Lebanon, stated that "any serious commemoration must include the aetiology of genocide, particularly those of the twentieth century, especially if one encouraged the next." The UK-based Refugee Council also supported this position, since the event was supposed to include "all victims of genocide."

The British government faced a flurry of public criticism for its decision not to include the Armenian Genocide, most notably in the daily newspaper The Independent, from its chief Middle East correspondent, British author Robert Fisk. After months of pressure, the government allowed 20 Armenian survivors to attend the event in its first annual commemoration. Armenians contended that the British government held out for so long because it wished to preserve its relationship with the successor state of the Ottoman Empire and NATO ally, Turkey.

=== Holocaust Memorial Day Trust controversy ===
The Holocaust Memorial Day Trust were criticised after Holocaust Remembrance Day in 2019. The Trust released a survey, commissioned by the Trust based on a tick-box online poll of ~2000 people by the market research company Opinion Matters. The headline was "five per cent of UK adults don't believe the Holocaust", a figure repeated in "lurid terms" in UK media such as "More than 2.6m Brits are Holocaust deniers, poll finds". More or Less, a BBC Radio 4 programme on the use and misuse of statistics, noted that the Holocaust Memorial Day Trust had provided only basic information on its Press Release, and Opinion Matters had refused to release "the full data on individual responses". In the programme, survey methodology experts described the results as "unlikely", saying there were "some serious flaws with this study", that the design of the survey displayed "poor practice", and that the questions were badly written and with poor consistency risking respondents agreeing things they actually disagree with. Inconsistencies in responses suggested lack of clarity in the questions: "when asked how many Jewish people were murdered during the Holocaust: only 5 people in the entire survey gave an answer of zero ... so that's one quarter of 1% ... a figure inconsistent with the 5% (figure) of people (who) deny the Holocaust occurrence". They compared the poll to a US study from the 1990s that, due to "confusing multiple negatives" in its questions, estimated the number of Holocaust deniers in the US at more than 20% when the correct number was more like 2% of the population. Matthew Parris wrote that the Holocaust Memorial Day Trust had "defamed Britain", suggesting the Trust has designed its survey from a desire to produce bad news for effect.

== See also ==
- International Holocaust Remembrance Day
- National Day of Commemorating the Holocaust (Romania)
- United States Holocaust Memorial Museum
- Yom HaShoah (Israel)
- Roma Holocaust Memorial Day
