= Robin Simcox =

Politician and researcher

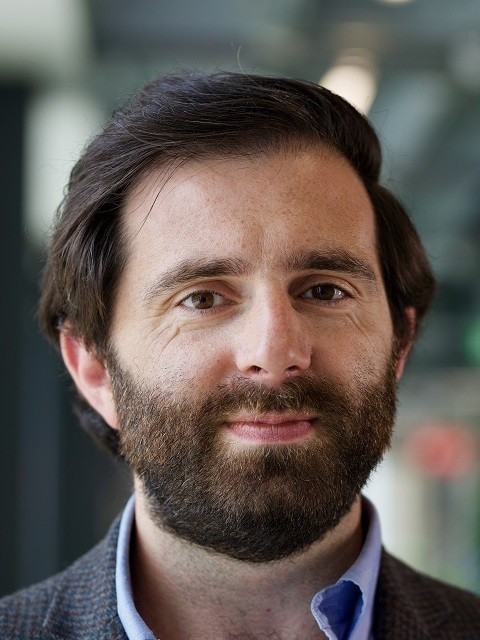
- Robin Simcox in 2020

Commissioner for Countering Extremism
- Incumbent
- Assumed office July 2022
- Appointed by: Priti Patel
- Preceded by: Himself

Interim Commissioner for Countering Extremism
- In office March 2021 – July 2022
- Prime Minister: Boris Johnson
- Preceded by: Sara Khan
- Succeeded by: Himself

Personal details
- Born: March 1983 (age 43)
- Education: University of Leeds; University of London

Robin Simcox (born March 1983) is a political researcher who is the current Commissioner for Countering Extremism (CCE) at the United Kingdom's Home Office.

== Education ==
Simcox graduated from the University of Leeds with a Bachelor of Arts degree in international history, and from the Institute for the Study of the Americas at the University of London with a Master of Science degree in US foreign policy.

== Career ==
In 2009, Simcox worked as a research fellow at the conservative Centre for Social Cohesion (CSC) think tank, at which he wrote a report on the Middle Eastern, Asian and Russian donors of UK universities, and later at the Henry Jackson Society when the CSC was subsumed into it in 2011. That year, he wrote in The Weekly Standard that while David Cameron's policies were neoconservative, the prime minister was "at pains not to be tarred with the neoconservative brush", as well as that neoconservatives' opponents had "hijacked the term" and that it should be taken back.

He joined The Heritage Foundation's Margaret Thatcher Centre for Freedom in January 2016 and became a Margaret Thatcher Fellow, specialising in counterterrorism. In a 2016 article, Simcox rejected the term "violent extremism" and argued that it was "dreamed up as a way to avoid saying 'Islamic' or 'Islamist' extremism in the months after the July 2005 suicide bombings in London". In a tweet in June 2019, he defended YouTuber Mark Meechan, also known as Count Dankula, who was convicted over a video showing a dog performing Nazi salutes. In another September 2019 article, he called for prime minister Boris Johnson to "push back on 'Islamophobia'" as a term used by the left, and to be "wary" of an internal review of the Conservative Party, while also stating that Extinction Rebellion, Unite Against Fascism and the far left "need monitoring". He left the Heritage Foundation to found the Counter Extremism Group in July 2020.

=== Commissioner for Countering Extremism ===
In March 2021, home secretary Priti Patel appointed Simcox as commissioner of the Commission for Countering Extremism in an interim capacity, replacing Sara Khan. Patel officially appointed Simcox as commissioner in July 2022 for a three-year term. In 2019, he had stated, in response to a report by the CCE, that the UK's official definition of a hate crime was "far too broad". He organised a Countering Extremism conference on 1 March 2023, at which home secretary Suella Braverman made a speech on political correctness. In August 2023, The Independent noted that since his appointment, the CCE had "published no new research or scrutiny of government policy".

In October 2023, following the beginning of the Gaza war, Simcox argued in The Times that the UK was a "permissive environment" for antisemitism, and that the country was bearing the cost of a "three-decade long failed policy mix of mass migration and multiculturalism". Tom Tugendhat, the Minister of State for Security, denied this and argued that threats to all communities were taken "extremely seriously". He conducted his first broadcast interview on 18 October on Newsnight with Mark Urban. On 19 October, Simcox called for the Islamic Revolutionary Guard Corps (IRGC) in Iran to be proscribed as a terrorist organisation in a speech to the Royal United Services Institute think tank, his first as CCE Commissioner. In the same speech, he argued that the pro-Palestinian "from the river to the sea" chant should be seen as "genocidal in nature" and that environmental groups would "become increasingly militant and that acts of violence will be the logical end". The speech was criticised by anti-racism advocacy group Hope not Hate, which argued that "he omits the danger of rising anti-Muslim hate and plays down the very real threat of the far right".

In March 2024, he wrote in an article in The Daily Telegraph that London was a "no-go zone for Jews", in response to pro-Palestinian marches, and stated that ministers should "be willing to accept higher legal risk" when tackling extremism. In February 2025, the Home Office announced an open competition to appoint Simcox's successor in the Commissioner for Countering Extremism role, with security minister Dan Jarvis thanking him for his work.
