= Serpa Pinto incident =

1944 maritime incident

- Part of Battle of the Atlantic and World War II
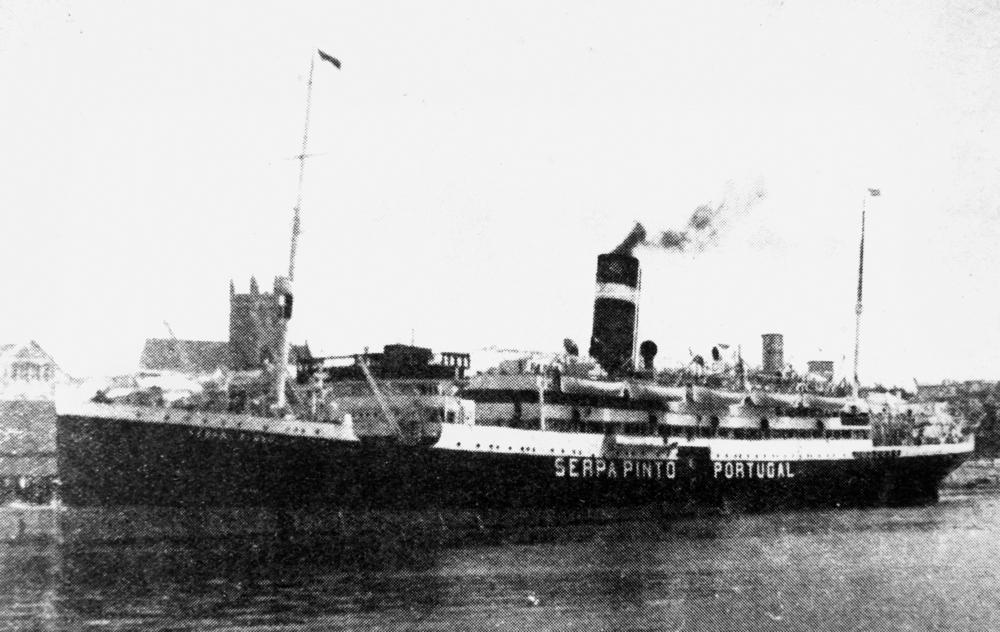
- Serpa Pinto during the Second World War
Date	26 May 1944 (~9 hours)
Location	Atlantic Ocean
Result	Ship searched; Passengers and crew temporarily evacuated; Ship allowed to continue its journey

Belligerents
Portugal; Companhia Colonial de Navegação; United States	Germany

Commanders and leaders
Unknown	Unknown

Units involved
(Portugal) Serpa Pinto	(Nazi Germany) U-541

Strength
1 ship 150 crew	1 submarine

Casualties and losses
Portugal: 3 dead United States: 2 captured	None

The Serpa Pinto incident was a World War II maritime incident that occurred on 26 May 1944 in the Atlantic Ocean when the German submarine U-541 stopped and searched the Portuguese ocean liner Serpa Pinto. After detaining the ship's crew and passengers for around nine hours, the ship was allowed to continue its course. However, there were three deaths and the two Americans were captured and detained by the Germans.

== Background ==
On 16 May 1944, NT Serpa Pinto, with 150 repatriates on board, left Lisbon for Philadelphia. She called at Porto on 18 May, and Ponta Delgada in the Azores on 21 May.

== Incident ==
On 26 May 1944, Serpa Pinto was intercepted in the Atlantic by the German submarine U-541. The U-boat crew ordered all passengers and crew to abandon the ship and board lifeboats for nine hours while the Germans searched the vessel. Although Serpa Pinto was not carrying war materials, it was carrying Jewish children who had left their parents behind as only children were being welcomed.

The ordeal led to the capture of two young Americans and the deaths of three passengers: the ship's doctor died by falling from a rope ladder into the sea, one of the cooks was killed by the block and tackle, and a 16-month-old daughter of a Polish refugee couple was killed when one of the lifeboats was being lowered and one of the boat's falls broke, tipping all of its occupants into the sea. After the search, the ship was allowed to proceed.

== Aftermath ==
The incident caused alarm within the United States, prompting the US State Department to consider prohibiting American citizens from using Portuguese vessels. In the end, only government officials were barred, while civilians were merely warned of the risks. The British government, concerned about the impact on evacuee repatriations, ensured that planned operations continued without restrictions.

== Passengers ==
Joan Salter was three years old and a passenger accompanied by her elder sister.
