= Harun Khan =

Secretary General of the Muslim Council of Britain from 2016 to 2021

Harun Rashid Khan (known as Harun Khan) was the Secretary General of the Muslim Council of Britain from 2016 to 2021. The Muslim Council of Britain is a national umbrella body which currently serves more than 500 Muslim organisations and institutions in the UK. He was first elected to the position in 2016 and was the first British-born Secretary General of the organisation, and was the youngest person to be elected into the role. He was re-elected in 2018 as Secretary General, for a further 2-year term. In 2021, he was replaced by Zara Mohammed.

== Early life ==
Khan was born in Whitechapel, East London. His father emigrated from Bangladesh to East London in 1958 and worked in the garment trade and the restaurant industry. His mother was a seamstress. He has three sisters.

Khan is married and has three daughters.

== Education ==
Khan attended Raine's Foundation School, a Church of England school in East London. He completed his A-Levels at Lime Grove College. He went on to study at the University of East London, completing a degree in Civil Engineering.

== Career ==
During his time at the University of East London, Khan worked as a trainee civil engineer at Tower Hamlets Council, studying for his degree part-time. He later worked at Transport for London, becoming a senior manager before joining the Muslim Council of Britain. Within the MCB, he has previously held the roles of Chair of the London Committee, Treasurer and Deputy Secretary General before being elected as Secretary General, initially in 2016.
