= Visit My Mosque =

Initiative encouraging British mosques to hold open days

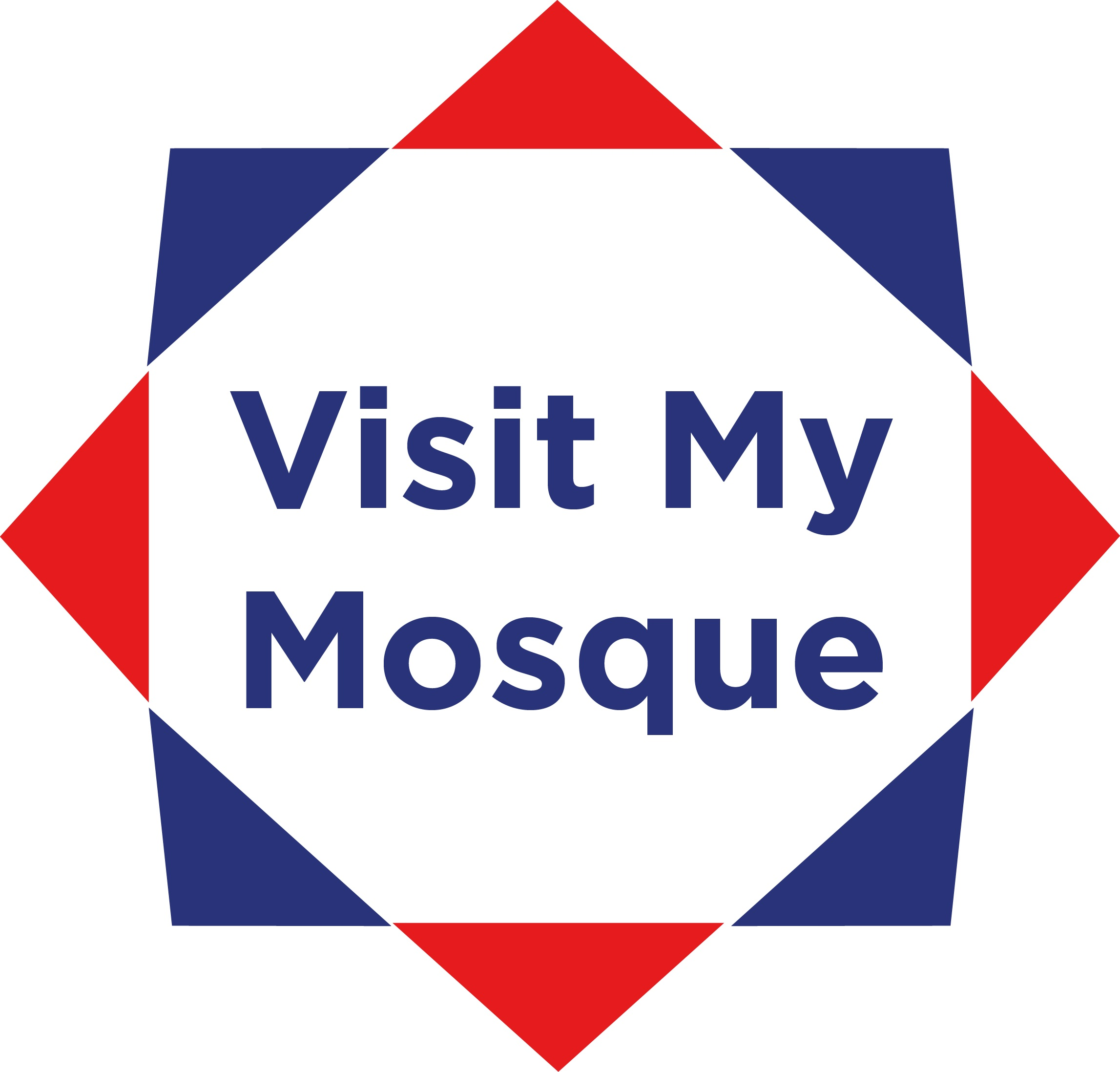
The "Visit My Mosque" logo

Visit My Mosque day is a national initiative facilitated by the Muslim Council of Britain (MCB), encouraging mosques across the United Kingdom to hold mosque open days.

The Muslim Council of Britain is a representative Muslim umbrella organization with over 500 affiliated national, regional and local organisations, mosques, charities and schools.

It runs annually and aims to encourage all mosques in the UK to host an open day at least once a year. Further aims include dispelling misconceptions about Islam, making members of the British public more aware of their Muslim neighbours and increasing community cohesion in cities and towns across the UK.

Starting with about 20 mosques in 2015, it grew to over 80 mosques in 2016 and over 150 mosques in 2017. The 2017 event highlighted social action initiatives including feeding the homeless, blood donation drives, working with refugees and food collection drives for local food banks. "Visit My Mosque day" in 2018 saw more than 200 mosques take part in the initiative, under the theme "Open Doors | Open Mosques | Open communities". A YouGov poll, commissioned by the MCB found that 90% of Britons had not been inside a mosque in recent years. The poll also found that 70% of Britons have not been inside another faith's place of worship. The theme was all about letting the local community know that they are welcome, while encouraging other places of worship to uphold an open door policy at least once a year also. Visit My Mosque day is reported widely in the national and international press. Mosques from England, Scotland, Wales and Northern Ireland take part.

Many mosques in the United Kingdom hold open days or tours for neighbours, schools and members of the public regularly and many have open door policies. Visit My Mosque day is essentially an initiative whereby mosques time their open days to be on the same day of the year.
