= Commission for Countering Extremism =

British government agency

Front cover of the February 2021 report of the Commission: Operating with Impunity - Hateful extremism: The need for a legal framework

The Commission for Countering Extremism (CCE) is a British government agency created under Prime Minister Theresa May in response to the 2017 Manchester Arena bombing. Its key purpose is to provide the UK government with impartial scrutiny and advice on preventing and addressing extremism and violent radicalisation.

Robin Simcox is the current Commissioner for Countering Extremism. The Commission works primarily with the Home Office.

== Background and criticism ==
The idea for the agency was mentioned in the 2017 election platform of the Conservative Party, released four days before the Manchester bombing attack. May described the Commission as a way to fight extremism similar to the approach used to fight against racism.

However, from its early days, the Commission received criticism, including criticism of its staffing and budget. For example, former Conservative Party chairwoman Sayeeda Warsi, Harun Khan, the secretary general of the Muslim Council of Britain, and Labour MP Naz Shah criticised the appointment of one of the commissioners.

In March 2021, Priti Patel appointed Robin Simcox as interim commissioner. Prior to the appointment, Simcox was a research fellow at the neo-conservative Henry Jackson Society think tank, and as a Margaret Thatcher Fellow at The Heritage Foundation's Margaret Thatcher Center for Freedom, specialising in counterterrorism. In 2019, he had stated that the UK's official definition of a hate crime was "far too broad" in response to a CCE report. He also founded the Counter Extremism Group organisation. Patel officially appointed Simcox as commissioner in July 2022.

In October 2021, The Independent reported that since 2019, ministers had not formally responded to any of the reports released by the commission.

The Commission's 2022-23 end of year report noted that it had commissioned research on "how blasphemy is viewed and presented by UK Islamists" and "how various fringe ideologies promote anti-government messaging online".

In August 2023, a report by The Independent stated that the CCE had underspent £300,000 in 2021-22, and £680,000 (over a third of its budget) in 2022-23 which the commission stated was partially due to "delays in staff recruitment" and "setting up project work", returning both amounts to the Home Office. The newspaper also reported that since Simcox's 2021 appointment, the commission had "published no new research or scrutiny of government policy," but that it was mostly working on the implementation of the findings of a review of the government's Prevent counterterrorism programme, a measure asked of Simcox by home secretary Suella Braverman.

A key role of the Commission was to receive complaints about the government's Prevent programme, which aims to stop and address violent radicalisation and extremism. However, this role is now being transferred onto the Office of the Independent Prevent Commissioner (OIPC) who is sponsored by the Home Office. Prevent itself has been criticised by many academics, campaigners, charities and community organisations, especially in the wake of the 2024 Southport stabbings.

In February 2025 the CCE assumed the former duties of the government's Adviser on Political Violence and Disruption after the latter position was abolished.
