= Var Ashe Houston =

Survivor of the Cambodian genocide

Var Ashe Houston BEM
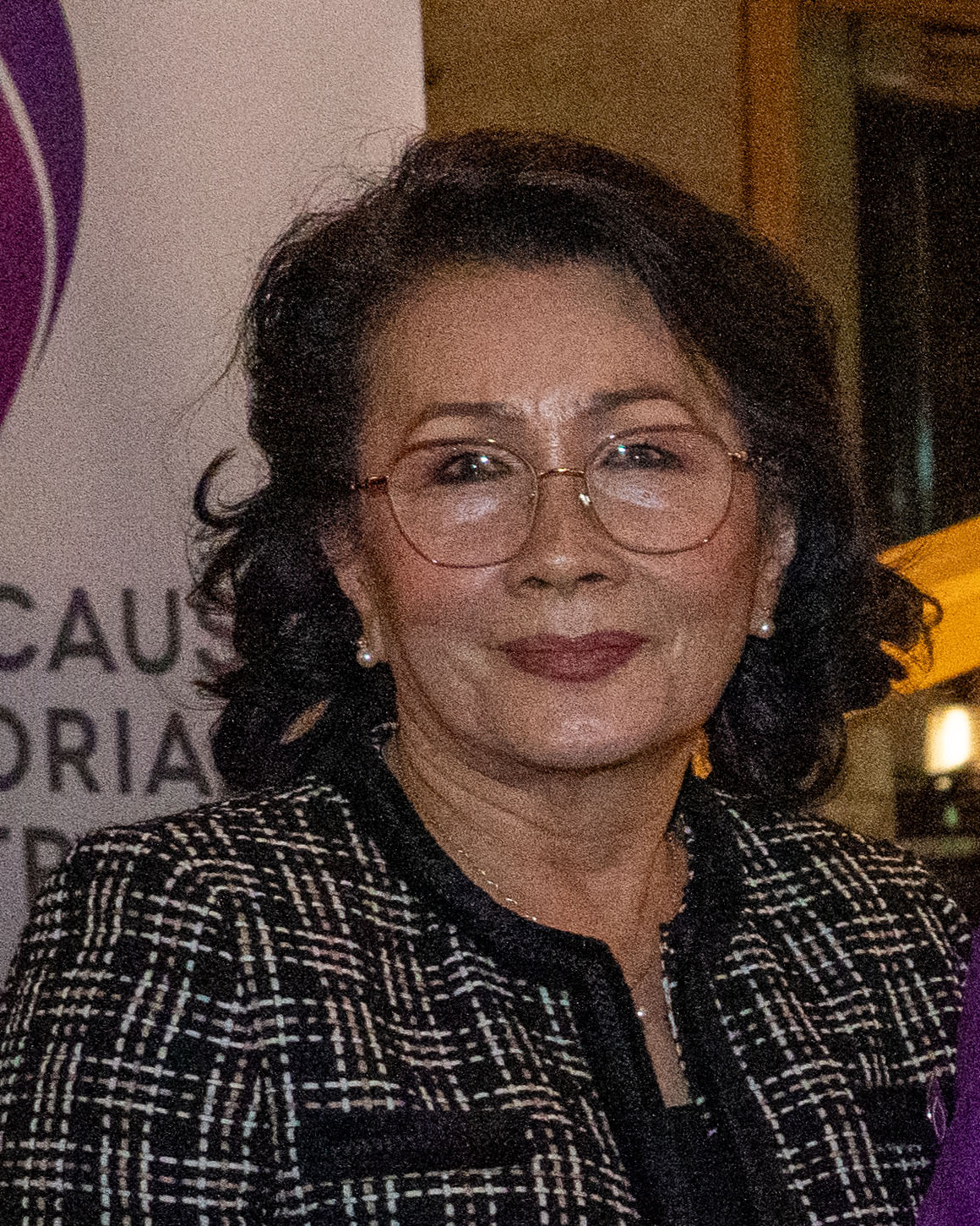
- Var Ashe Houston in 2026
- Born: Var Hong; 1948 or 1949 (age 76–77); Takéo, Cambodia
- Other names: Var Hong Ashe (former name)
- Known for: Surviving the Cambodian genocide
- Spouse(s): Virak Phong (died 1976) Robert Ashe (m. 1982; div. 1991) David Houston
- Children: 3

Var Ashe Houston BEM (born Var Hong, 1948 or 1949) is a survivor of the Cambodian genocide. She has resided in the United Kingdom since 1979 and has worked with organisations such as the Holocaust Memorial Day Trust to tell her story and educate the public about genocide.

== Biography ==
Houston was born in Takéo, in the south of Cambodia. She was raised by privileged and well-off parents who could afford to employ domestic helps in the house.

Houston was 26 when the Khmer Rouge took power of Cambodia in 1975. At the time, she was working as an English teacher at a college in Phnom Penh and her husband, Virak Phong, was working for UNESCO in Paris. They had two young daughters.

Houston and her family were expelled from their home by the Khmer Rouge. They later learned that Houston's father, a military colonel, was killed by the regime. Her brother An was a soldier under Lon Nol's regime and was thus taken away and presumed dead. Houston's husband was tricked into returning to Cambodia in 1976 under the guise of the Khmer Rouge needing intellectuals to help rebuild the country. He was arrested upon arrival in Phnom Penh and later died in prison. Houston only learned of his fate in 1981.

Houston later escaped to Thailand with her daughters and one sister, leaving behind her mother and two sisters. At the refugee camp in Thailand, she met English humanitarian worker Robert Ashe. Houston and her daughters later settled in England as refugees and she eventually married Ashe in 1982. They went on to have a son together in 1984 before separating in 1991. Houston has since remarried to her current husband, David.

Houston wrote about her experience of the Cambodian genocide in her book, From Phnom Penh to Paradise, published by Hodder & Stoughton in 1988.

Houston was awarded a British Empire Medal in the 2022 New Year Honours for services to Holocaust Remembrance.
