= Festival of Muslim Cultures =

The Festival of Muslim Cultures, a national celebration of Muslim cultures held in the United Kingdom, began in January 2006 and ended July 2007. It imitated an earlier event in 1976.

The official website states: "The Festival was created out of the need to encourage a better understanding between Muslims and non Muslims (as a two-way process), to promote respect for Muslim cultures and to demonstrate how culture creates the pathways that connect us all together." Organizers say that festival events were chosen because they represent the best of the Muslim arts world and they "portray diversity and plurality".

== Festival's organisation ==
Charles III, then Prince of Wales, was a patron, and the festival director was Isabel Carlisle. Shiban Akbar of the MCB was on the Advisory Board.

=== Trustees ===
- Raficq Abdulla MBE (Lawyer, interpreter of Rumi and Attar, broadcaster and writer)
- Mahmood Ahmed (Corporate Lawyer and former President of the Ismaili Council for the UK)
- Majid Dawood (CEO of Yasaar, Shariah compliance services company)
- Sayyed Nadeem Kazmi (Head of International Development, Al-Khoei Foundation, London)
- Shahwar Sadeque (Former BBC Governor and former Commissioner of the Commission for Racial Equality)

As a founder trustee, the late Dr Zaki Badawi played a key role from the beginning in shaping the Festival.

== Funding ==
The festival, a registered charity, received government funding from: Arts Council England, City of London, Foreign and Commonwealth Office (FCO), Home Office and British Council. It had a provisional budget of £6 million (2006) (equivalent to £10.4 million or US$13.7 million in 2025).

== Controversy ==
In August 2005, The Observer reported that the Muslim Council of Britain (MCB) used its influence in Whitehall to gain a place on the festival's board of trustees. Festival organisers were instructed to comply with Islamic sharia law to gain MCB's full support.

The organisers are now concerned that the festival will lose political backing if they invite performers who are seen to be 'un-Islamic'. Festival organisers already hope to invite the Uzbek singer, Sevara Nezarkhan, who does not wear the headscarf or 'hijab' and has worked with Jewish 'klezmer' musicians. It also intends to exhibit the 14th-century world history of Rashid al-Din, which represents the human form and the prophet Mohammed himself, thought by some strict Muslims to be forbidden. Other performers could include the Senegalese musician Youssou N'dour and the Bangladeshi-British dancer Akram Khan. The Observer understands that the Foreign Office insisted that the festival organisers involved the MCB before they would give them their full backing. As a result, an MCB nominee has been taken on to the festival's board of trustees. One source close to the festival organisers said, "We constantly found our efforts were being blocked and it kept coming back to the MCB and its sympathisers within Whitehall."

The MCB responded with, "The MCB believes that the Festival will need to be broad-based, inclusive and mindful of the teachings of Islam if it is to have the support of British Muslims."

Just days after the controversy surrounding MCB Secretary General Iqbal Sacranie's comments on homosexuality, the conservative British Muslim establishment became embroiled in another homophobia scandal. On 23 January 2006 Sandra Laville reported in The Guardian, 'Promotional publicity states that the festival will feature the 'diversity and plurality' of Muslim cultures, but gay Muslims say they have been refused permission to present an event.’ Aaron Saeed, Muslim affairs spokesman for the gay rights group OutRage!, wrote to festival director Isabel Carlisle, offering to stage an event celebrating the lives and experiences of gay Muslims in Britain and abroad but his offer was refused.

In Isabel Carlisle's reply, she justifies the exclusion of gay Muslims on the grounds 'we are not prepared to present works that will give offence to significant numbers.' However, when interviewed for The Guardian she claimed that gay Muslim participation was rejected because the festival does not want to feature 'political' themes.

“This is not what her rejection letter states," said Aaron Saeed. "It says we have been turned down because gay Muslims would give offence. Our proposal was not political. It was for a series of cultural events about the lives and experiences of lesbian and gay Muslims. We planned to organise these events in conjunction with gay Muslim individuals and organisations beyond OutRage!. These were never envisaged as OutRage! events. We made that clear. This ban is straightforward homophobia. It is deeply offensive to suggest that gay Muslim people are not a valid part of the Muslim community."

Saeed concludes, "It is appalling that a registered charity is allowed to discriminate against gay people ... It is time the conservative leadership of the Muslim community got used to the fact that gay Muslims are here to stay and here to fight." Muhammad Yusuf, a member of the Interfaith Alliance, said it was a "matter of regret" that a festival aiming to reflect the diversity of Muslim culture was not prepared to take on board a facet that was different by reason of sexual orientation.

== Events of the Festival ==
Initial events included

- The historical exhibition "Palace and Mosque: Islamic Treasure of the Middle East from the V&A" at Sheffield Millennium Galleries, drawn from one of the most renowned Islamic art collections in the world.
- "Egyptian Landscapes: 50 years of Tapestry Weaving at the Ramses Wissa Wassef Art Centre, Cairo", an exhibition of woven tapestries created over the last 50 years in a village near the pyramids of Giza, at the Brunei Gallery, London.
- "Contemporary Pakistani Printmakers" at Oriel Ceri Richards, Swansea.
- "Charity, Orphans & Foundlings In the Pre-Modern Islamic World," lecture by Dr. Gerald Hawting from SOAS held at the Foundling Museum.

Other events planned by the Festival's programme partners ranged from drama from the Middle East; a colourful contribution to the Edinburgh Festivals; a conference on "Faith and Identity in Contemporary Culture" in Manchester; a gathering of poets in Bradford and Leeds; contemporary British Muslim artists in Birmingham; a Pakistani film festival in Glasgow as well as a Sufi Festival; Muslim writers at the Hay Literary Festival; Quranic recitation in Leicester; an arts programme in Cardiff; and early music in York.

== See also ==
- Islam in the United Kingdom
- Homophobia
- Homosexuality and Islam
