= Freedom from Torture =

British charity

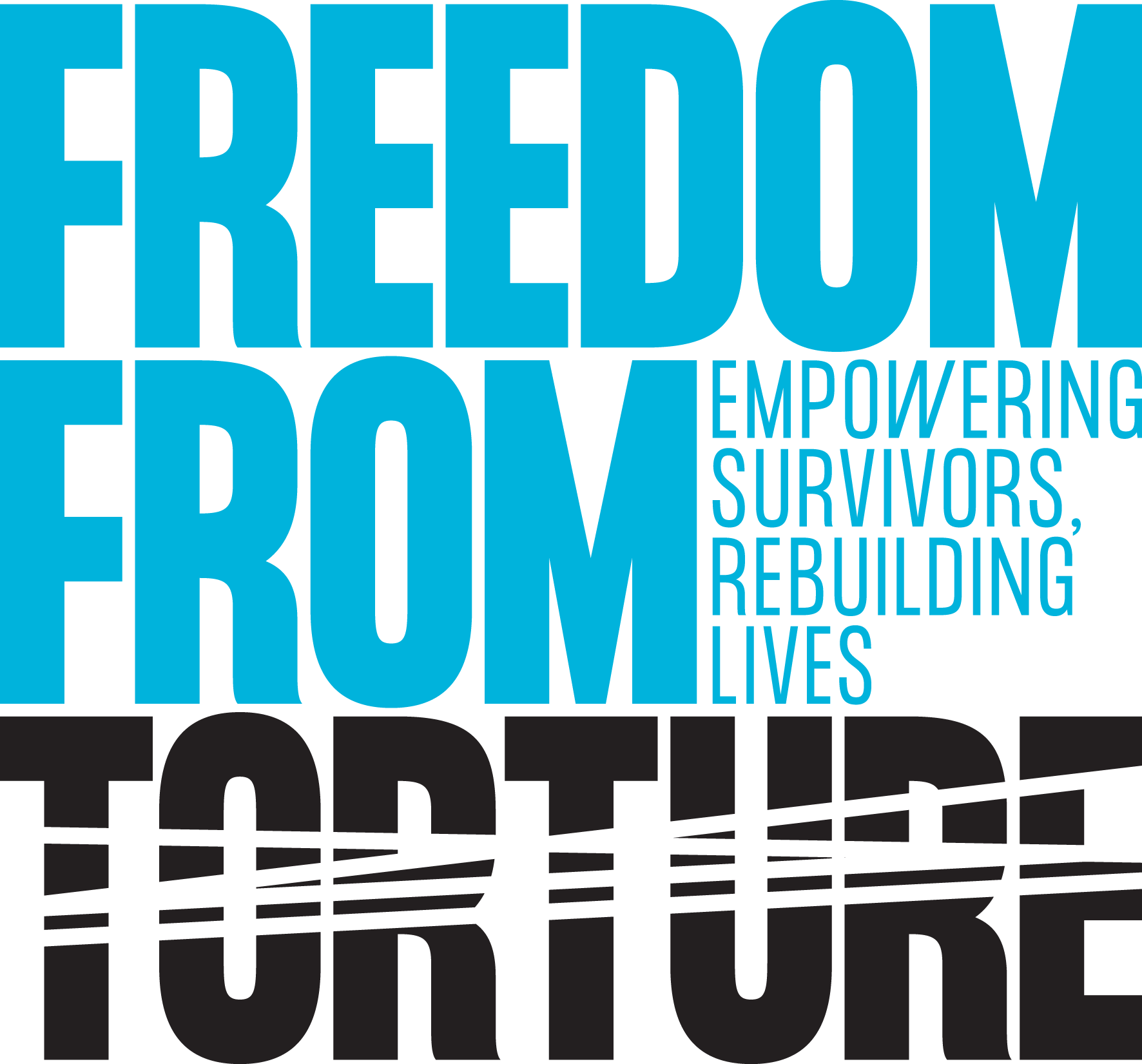
- Founded: 1985 by Helen Bamber in the United Kingdom
- Type: Charity
- Location(s): United Kingdom (Glasgow, London and Manchester)
- Services: Treating survivors of torture, advocacy
- Key people: Sonya Sceats (CEO)
- Website: www.freedomfromtorture.org

Freedom from Torture (previously known as The Medical Foundation for the Care of Victims of Torture) is a British registered charity that provides therapeutic care for survivors of torture who seek protection in the UK. Since it was established in 1985, more than 57,000 survivors of torture have been referred to the organisation for help and it is one of the world's largest torture treatment centres.

Freedom from Torture provides medical and psychological documentation of torture, a range of rehabilitation therapies, including psychotherapy, individual and family counselling, physiotherapy and complementary group work as well as practical advice and support. It trains health, legal and policy professionals throughout the UK to work with the complex needs and rights of torture survivors.

A key area of Freedom from Torture's work is to advocate for torture survivors and to ensure states responsible for torture are held accountable. It works to guarantee the human rights of survivors nationally and internationally. Freedom from Torture also supports Survivors Speak OUT (SSO), the UK's only torture survivor-led activist network. All members are former Freedom from Torture clients.

== History ==
Freedom from Torture began in the early 1980s, as part of the Medical Group of Amnesty International. The organisation was set up to improve existing health services for torture survivors in the UK. This work initially took the form of campaigns against violations of human rights and the documentation of evidence of torture by volunteer health professionals and senior medical specialists as a reaction .

In 1985, under the leadership of Helen Bamber, the organisation was established as a registered charity. It provided medical treatment, counselling and therapy to torture survivors and documented evidence of torture using the Istanbul Protocol. Sponsorship came from the heads of the Royal College of Physicians, Royal College of Psychiatrists and Royal College of Surgeons of England.

It worked at first in two rooms in the former National Temperance Hospital, off Hampstead Road in north-west London. By 1990, the organisation was treating 750 clients and then moved to a building in Grafton Road, Kentish Town.

The organisation began a regional programme in late 2003 with the opening of a centre in Manchester, treating clients living in the north-west. This followed the government's dispersal scheme, which saw asylum seekers relocated outside London.

In 2004, the London headquarters moved into a £5.8m treatment centre in Isledon Road, Finsbury Park. The building was purpose-built by architect Paul Hyett. Freedom from Torture's Scotland centre opened in Glasgow in 2004, followed by the Newcastle centre in 2006 and the Birmingham centre in 2009. These regional centres were opened to treat torture survivors who had been dispersed outside London.

In 2023 the charity was asked to take down a video on Twitter, which shows Holocaust survivor Joan Salter challenging the language of Suella Braverman who was calling the arrival of migrants "an invasion". CEO Sonya Sceats refused saying that they agreed that Braverman's words were "language she should be ashamed of".

== Treatment provided ==
Freedom from Torture provides a range of services for its clients. These include medical consultation, examination and forensic documentation of injuries through medico-legal reports, psychological and physical treatment and support, and practical help.

The organisation employs more than 156 staff and 140 volunteers across its centres in London, Manchester and Glasgow. These include medical doctors, caseworkers, counsellors, legal advisers, physiotherapists, psychotherapists, psychologists, interpreters, child and family therapists and group workers.

== Statistics ==
Since its founding in 1985, the organisation has received more than 57,000 referrals.

In 2016, Freedom from Torture's centres received 1,066 referrals for individuals from 76 different countries. The highest number of referrals came from Sri Lanka (230), Iran (140), Afghanistan (108), Nigeria (64), Democratic Republic of Congo (62), Turkey (56), Iraq (55), Pakistan (53), Syria (48) and Sudan (46).

Ninety-nine per cent of Freedom from Torture clients are asylum seekers or refugees, who have fled torture and persecution usually in their home countries.

== Medical legal reports ==
The organisation's Medico Legal Report Service accepts referrals from torture survivors, their friends and family, GPs, solicitors, refugee community organisations or any other voluntary or statutory sector body. Medico-legal reports provide detailed evidence of the extent of a torture survivor's injuries and trauma. Freedom from Torture's team of clinical staff apply international standards for documenting torture in these assessments.

== Funding ==
Freedom from Torture is an independent registered charity. According to the organization's Annual Report, individual donations made up almost 75% of their funding in 2015. They raise income using a variety of methods and from a variety of sources.
