= National Holocaust Centre and Museum =

Holocaust memorial centre in Nottinghamshire, England

Coordinates: 53.1962°N 0.9525°W

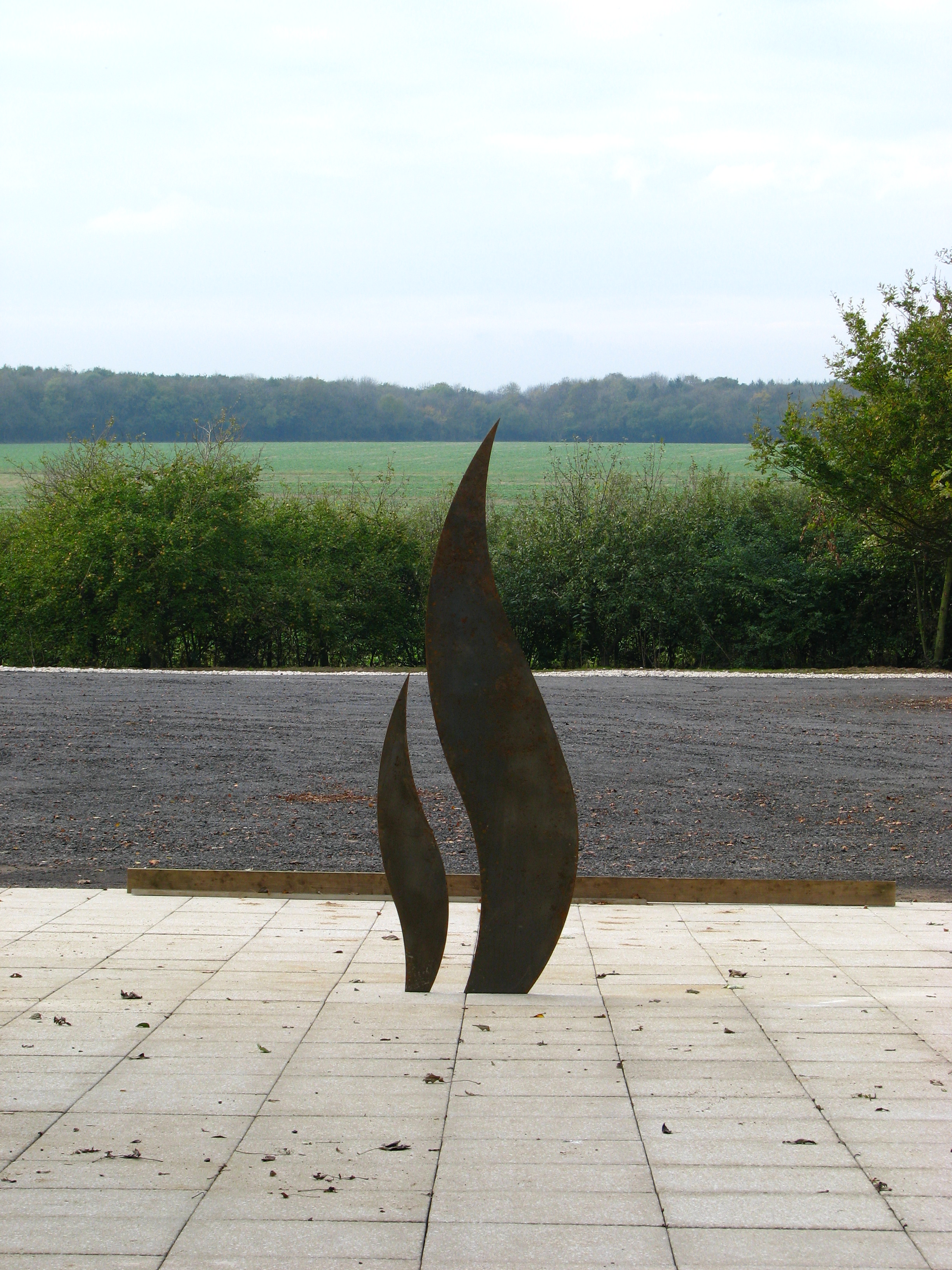
- Museum Sculpture

- Location within Nottinghamshire
- Established: 1995
- Location: Acre Edge Road, Laxton, Nottinghamshire NG22 0PA
- Collections: Art, artefacts, documents , images, oral testimonies and publications
- Directors: Dr. James and Stephen Smith. And formally their mother Marina Smith MBE.
- Owner: Beth Shalom Trust
- Website: National Holocaust Museum

The National Holocaust Centre and Museum, previously known as Beth Shalom (lit. "House of Peace"), is a Holocaust memorial centre in Laxton, Nottinghamshire, England.

== Description ==
Opened in September 1995, Beth Shalom was the first venue in Britain dedicated to the Holocaust as its primary purpose, though there is also a permanent exhibition at London's Imperial War Museum and another in Huddersfield, the Holocaust Exhibition and Learning Centre, which was opened in 2018. The Centre was founded by brothers James and Stephen Smith following a 1991 visit to Israel during which a trip to Yad Vashem changed the way they looked at history and the Holocaust.

The museum seeks to educate primary school children about the Holocaust through its primary exhibit on children's experiences, funded in part by a lottery grant of nearly £500,000. Prince Harry was educated about the Holocaust at the Centre after he was criticised for wearing a Nazi Afrika Korps costume with swastika armband to a fancy dress party in 2005.

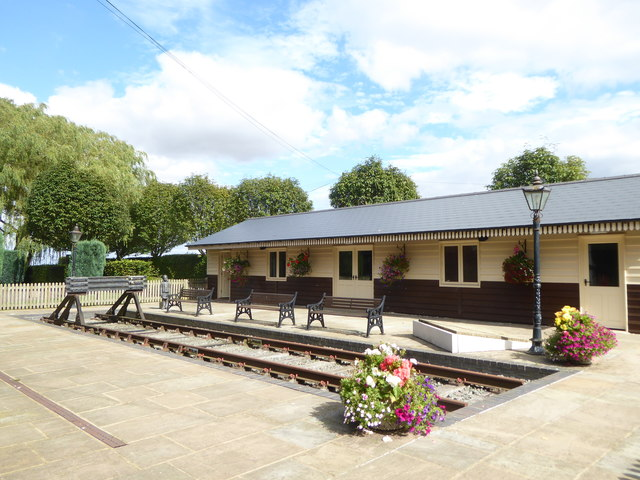
Mock railway station

On 21 July 2010, almost twenty years after the Holocaust Centre was founded, James and Stephen Smith and their mother Marina were each awarded honorary degrees of Doctor of Letters (DLitt) by Nottingham Trent University.

The venue is based around an old farm house (grid reference SK700670) which has a purpose-built exhibition centre with lecture theatre, and a Memorial Garden. A feature of the garden is a black stone on which are inscribed the names of the Nazi death camps. Joan Salter's suitcase and other artefacts belonging to the transatlantic holocaust survivor are part of the collection.

The centre is also home to the Aegis Trust, an all-party group working for genocide prevention.

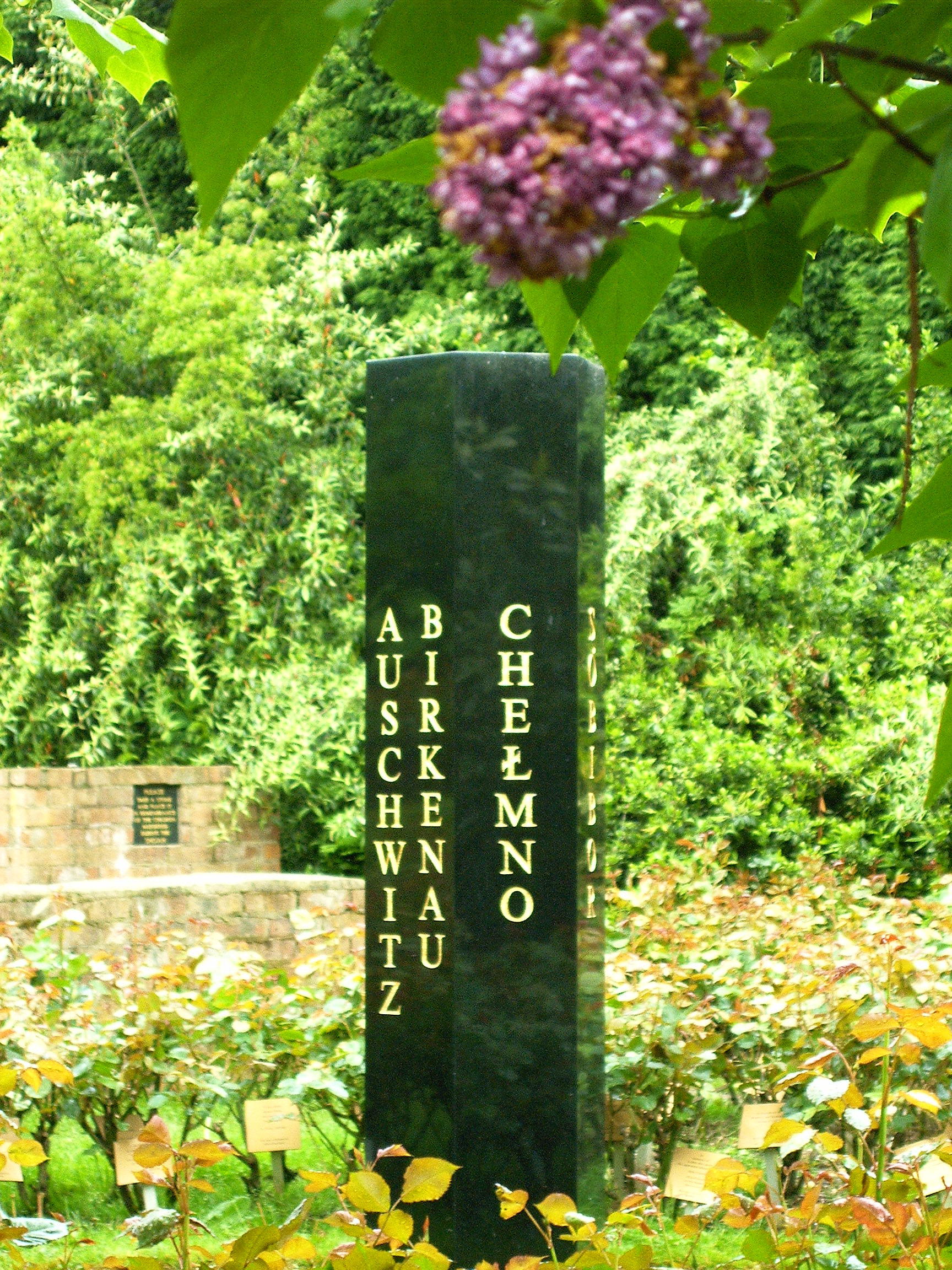
Holocaust Memorial Garden at Beth Shalom

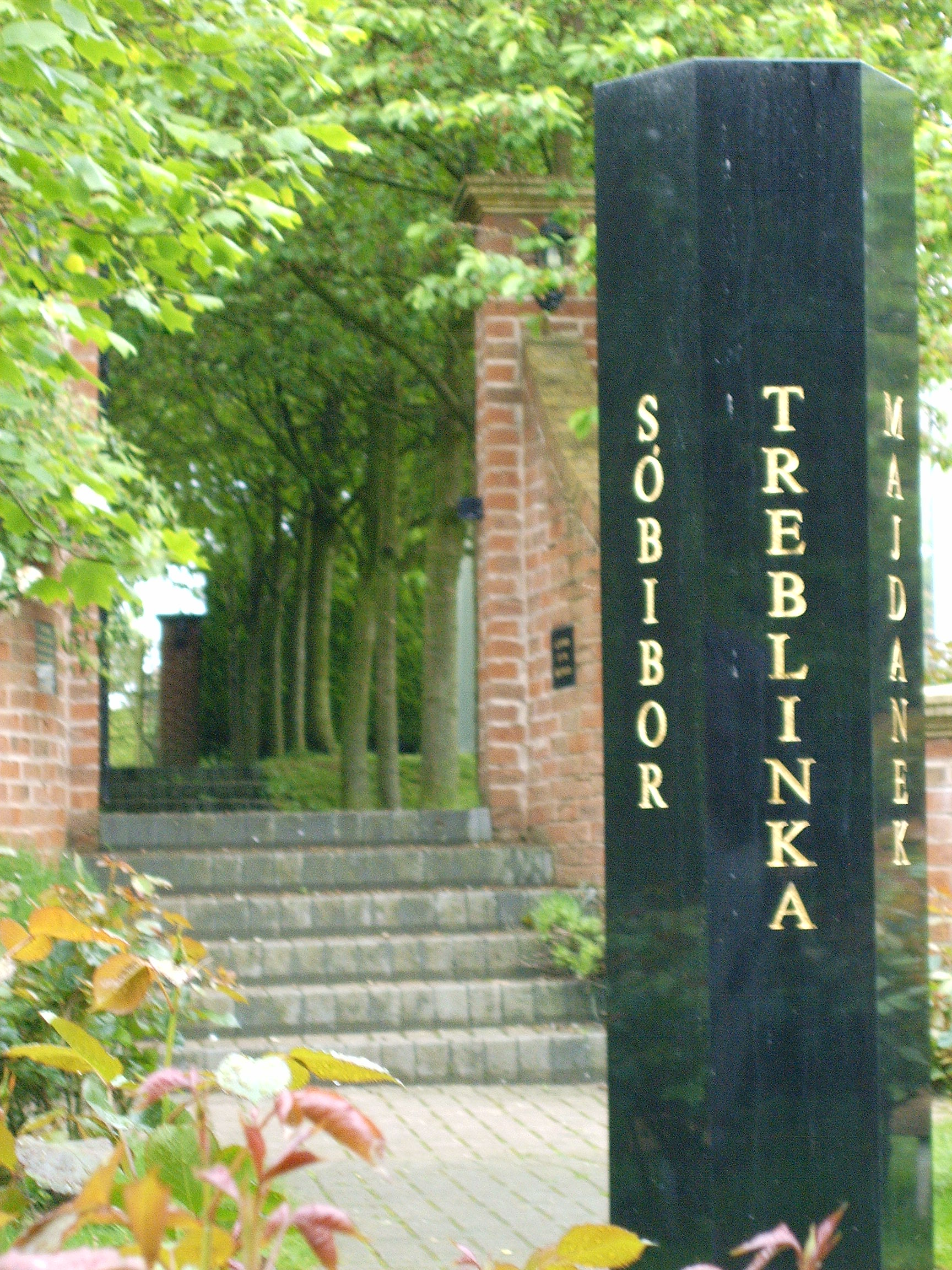
Garden at Beth Shalom

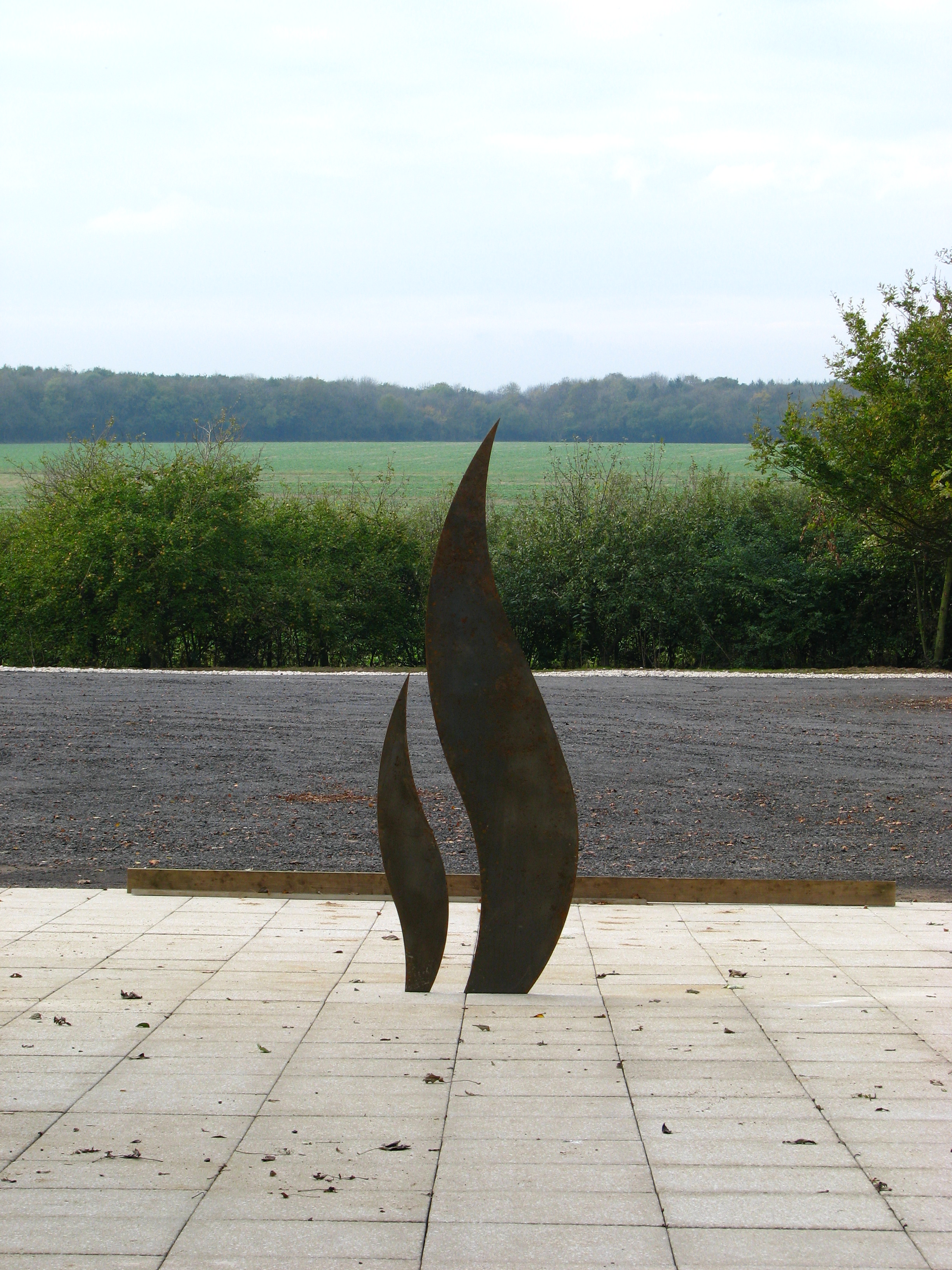
Flame sculpture

== See also ==
- Holocaust education
- Hyde Park Holocaust Memorial, unveiled in 1983
- The Wiener Library for the Study of the Holocaust and Genocide (London)
- Imperial War Museum
- List of Holocaust memorials and museums
