= Iqbal Sacranie =

Secretary General of the Muslim Council of Great Britain

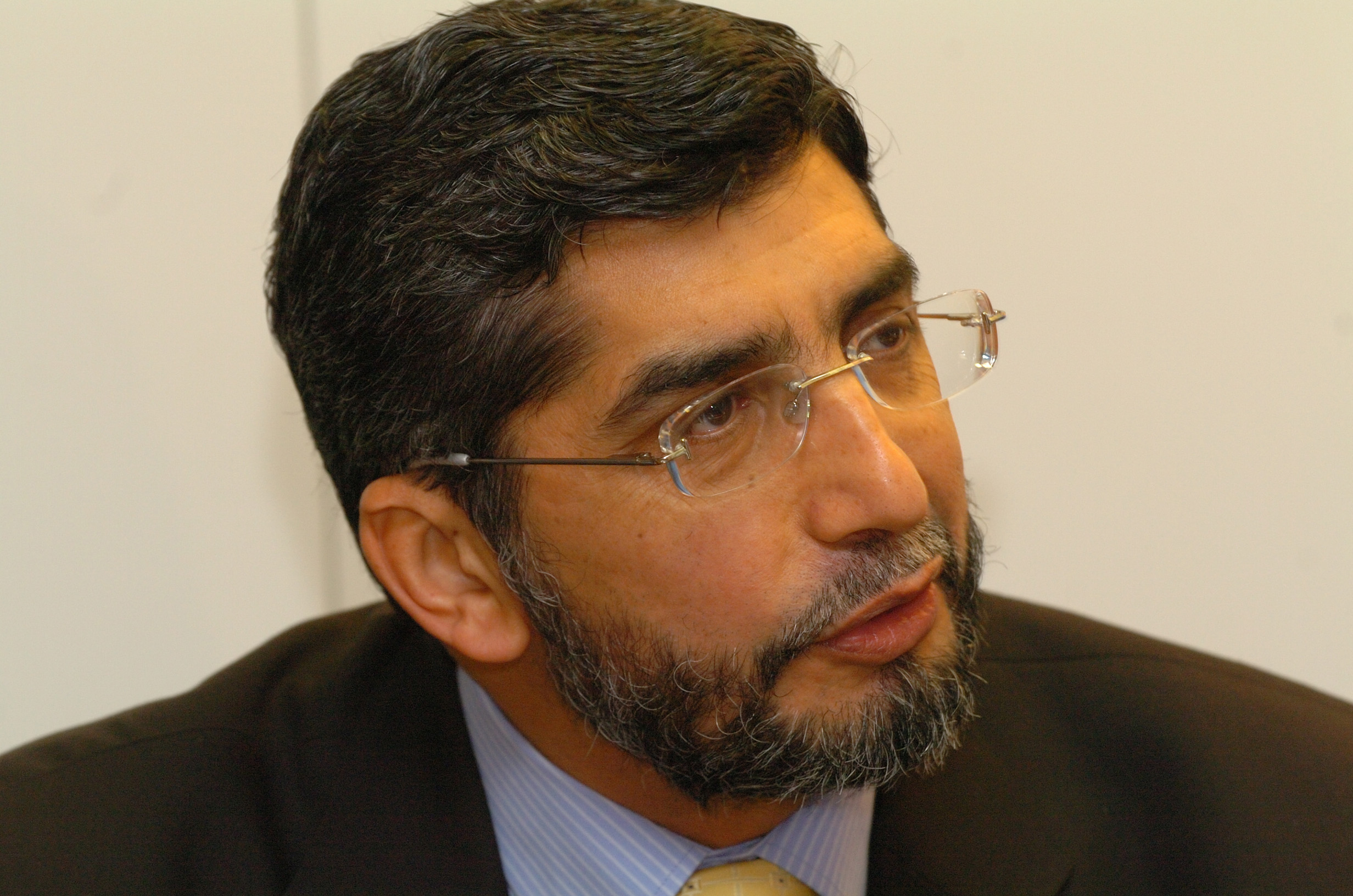
Iqbal Sacranie in 2005

Sir Iqbal Abdul Karim Mussa Sacranie, OBE (born 6 September 1951 in Malawi) was the Secretary General of the Muslim Council of Britain (MCB) until June 2006. He was appointed Officer of the Order of the British Empire (OBE) in 1999, and was knighted by the Queen in 2005. He was the founding Secretary General of the Muslim Council of Britain (established 1997), and served four further years as Secretary General from 2002 to 2004 and 2004 to 2006.

Born in Zomba, Malawi, Sir Iqbal Sacranie migrated to the United Kingdom in 1969 to pursue further studies and build a future grounded in both professional excellence and community service. Over the decades, he emerged as an influential voice representing Muslims in Britain and Europe, dedicating more than four decades of service to strengthening social cohesion, promoting dialogue among faiths and advocating for equality and fair representation of minority communities.

The renowned Guardian newspaper named him in 2002 as 'The most influential Muslim in the UK'. In 2005 the GQ magazine produced a list of 100 Most Powerful Men in Britain and he was ranked at number 10 as the voice of Muslims in Britain, who plays a vital role as mediator in multi-cultural In July 2006, Leeds Metropolitan University bestowed on him an Honorary Doctorate of Law in recognition of his services to Charities and community.

A pioneering figure in British Muslim institutional development, Sir Iqbal played a historic role in the formation of the Muslim Council of Britain (MCB) established in 1997 and served as its first elected Founding Secretary General. Under his leadership, the organisation evolved into the largest umbrella body representing Muslim institutions across the United Kingdom, working to promote civic engagement, social responsibility and constructive dialogue between communities and the government. ([Wikipedia][1])

Beyond strengthening community representation, Sir Iqbal has been deeply engaged in humanitarian and charitable initiatives worldwide. He served as Chairman and Trustee of Muslim Aid one of the United Kingdom’s leading international relief agencies providing humanitarian assistance in more than 40 countries worldwide. His work has extended across disaster relief, poverty alleviation and humanitarian advocacy, helping vulnerable communities across continents. ([Global Muslim Business Forum][2])

Sir Iqbal’s influence also extends into the business and economic sphere. He serves as the first Chairman of the Muslim Trade Forum UK. He is the Chairman of the Global Group of Companies, a diversified business enterprise engaged in real estate, international trade, investment and consultancy. Through these platforms, he has consistently promoted ethical entrepreneurship and economic empowerment within minority communities. ([Global Muslim Business Forum][2])

Recognised for his outstanding service to society and humanity Sir Iqbal was appointed an Officer the Order of the British Empire (OBE) in 1999 by former Prince of Wales now King Charles, for his contributions to community relations, charity and interfaith understanding. In 2005, his outstanding dedication and remarkable leadership were further recognised and honoured by the late Her Majesty Queen Elizabeth II who bestowed him the title of Knighthood making him one of the most distinguished Muslim community leaders in Britain.

Over the years, Sir Iqbal has served on numerous advisory bodies and international forums such as World Islamic Economic Forum (Malaysia) , International Cooperation Platform (Bosphorus Summit - Turkey) and the Muslim World League (Saudi Arabia). He has also advised British government Ministers on issues of race relations and community engagement. His voice has consistently advocated for peaceful coexistence, inclusive societies and stronger bridges between cultures and faiths.

Deeply connected to the global Memon community, Sir Iqbal played an important leadership role with colleagues in establishing the first umbrella body of Memon community in the world called World Memon Organisation. The aim of the WMO is to promote unity, establish social welfare and educational advancement projects among Memons worldwide. Sir Iqbal was elected as the first Deputy President of the organisation serving under Late Haji Abdul Razzak ( ARY) , its first President. He now serves as a Patron of WMO.

He spends more time in mentoring and promoting leadership within the youth in all communities. In 2021 he was elected as the first Deputy President of Memon Leadership Forum ( MLF). A global forum whose aim is to encourage and promote the youth to take leadership position in community organisations, businesses, politics and in professional bodies worldwide.

Sacranie serves on the boards of several international and natural organisations. His work with these organisations, along with his broader public and community activities, has been widely recognized within muslim community engagement efforts.

He was Chairman of Muslim Aid and, since 2012, is on its executive committee.

== See also ==
- Islam in the United Kingdom
- Festival of Muslim Cultures

== Notes ==
Titles in Islam
New creation	Secretary-General of the Muslim Council of Britain; 1997–2000	Succeeded by Yousuf Bhailok
Preceded by Yousuf Bhailok	Secretary-General of the Muslim Council of Britain; 2002–2006	Succeeded by Muhammad Abdul Bari
