= Zara Mohammed =

First woman secretary general of the Muslim Council of Britain

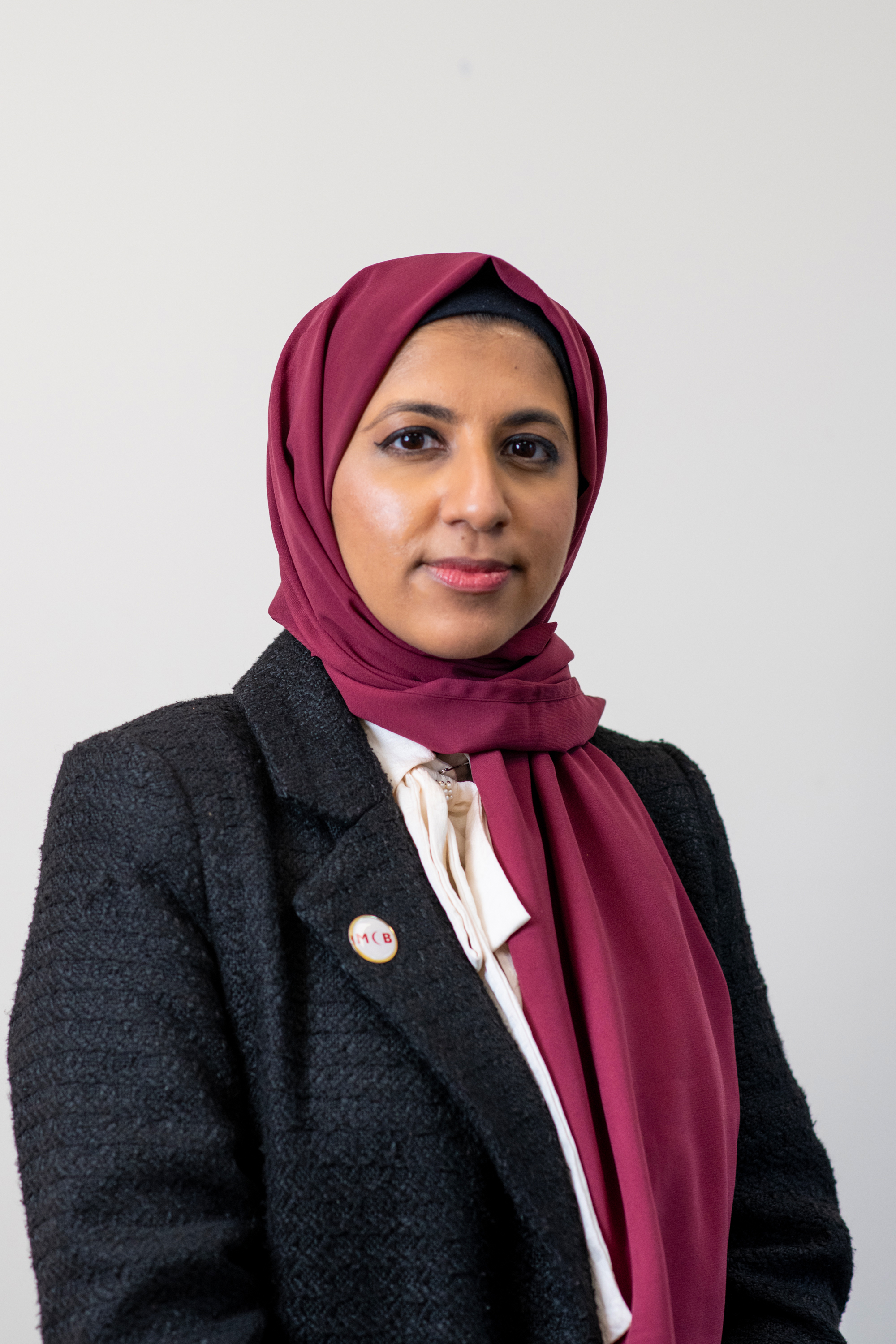
- Born: 2 August 1991 (age 35); Glasgow, Scotland
- Education: University of Strathclyde
- Known for: Secretary General of the Muslim Council of Britain

Zara Mohammed (born 2 August 1991) is a Pakistani-Scottish faith leader serving as Secretary General of the Muslim Council of Britain from 2021 until January 2025. She was the first woman to lead the organisation.

== Biography ==
Mohammed's grandparents immigrated to Britain from Multan, Pakistan. She was born in Glasgow, Scotland, and studied at the University of Strathclyde, where she graduated with an LLB. She gained a BA (Hons) in Law and Politics in 2013, followed by an LLM in Human Rights Law in 2014. In 2016, she became the first woman to lead the Federation of Student Islamic Societies (FOSIS). She has served as a lawyer since that year.

Mohammed previously served as the Assistant Secretary General for the Muslim Council of Britain (MCB), and was elected Secretary General of the organisation in 2021 after receiving the majority of affiliate votes over her competitor, Ajmal Masroor. This was the first time a woman had held the position; Mohammed was additionally the youngest, as well as the first Pakistani-Scottish, person to serve in the role.

=== As Secretary General of the MCB, 2021-25 ===
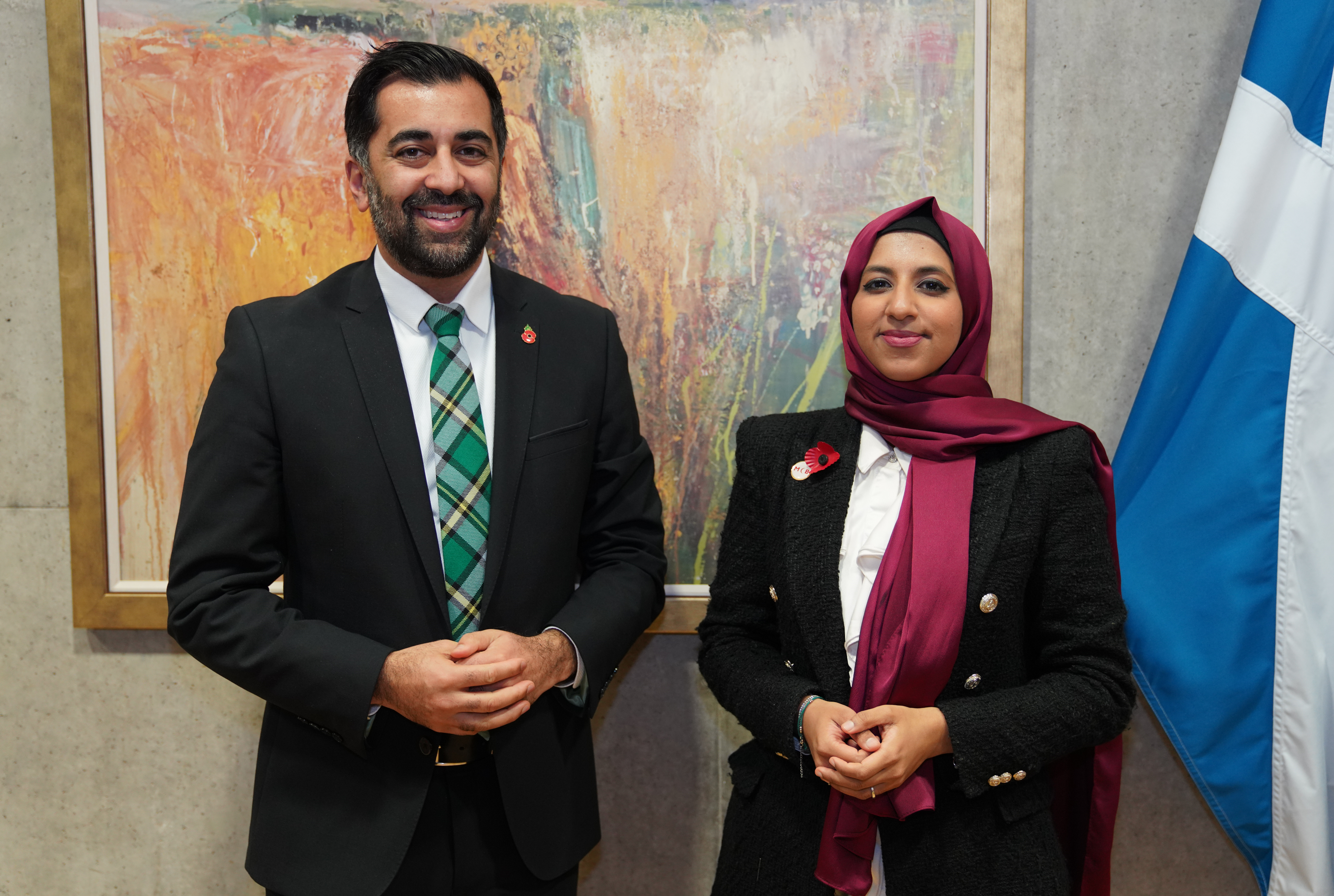
First Minister of Scotland Humza Yousaf meeting with Zara Mohammed, 7 November 2023

On 19 February 2021, Mohammed met with the Paymaster General, Penny Mordaunt, breaking with the Government policy since 2009 of not engaging with the body.

==== Woman's Hour controversy ====
On 4 February 2021, in her first week in office, Mohammed appeared as a guest on the BBC Radio 4 programme Woman's Hour to discuss her election as secretary general. During the interview, presenter Emma Barnett repeatedly questioned, and interrupted, Mohammed on the number of female imams in the United Kingdom. Footage of the interview was uploaded to Woman's Hour's Twitter page, but was removed after subsequent backlash over Barnett's perceived hostility.

Subsequently, an open letter was published criticising Barnett's line of questioning and tone during the interview. The more than 100 signatories included politicians Sayeeda Warsi and Diane Abbott, writer Yassmin Abdel-Magied and comedian Deborah Frances-White. A BBC spokesperson said the corporation would reply "in due course".

In August 2021, she was named by British Vogue as one of the 25 most influential women in the UK. She later described this as one of the highlights of her term:

“I got to meet Vivienne Westwood. But the real highlight was Muslim mums and young girls coming up to me afterwards. One mum said, ‘You don’t know what it means for my daughters to see you in Vogue.’ A 14-year-old girl told me she’d been struggling to wear her hijab, but I had inspired her.”
