= Muslim Council of Britain =

British Islamic organisation

- Abbreviation: MCB
- Formation: 23 November 1997
- Type: Religious organisation
- Legal status: Charity
- Purpose: policy advice, advocacy
- Region served: United Kingdom
- Secretary-general: Wajid Akhter
- Affiliations: Sunni Islam and Shia Islam
- Website: mcb.org.uk

The Muslim Council of Britain (MCB) is an umbrella body of Muslim organisations in the United Kingdom, with over 500 affiliated mosques and organisations. It was formed in 1994 in response to British government's expressed wish for a single representative body of Muslims it could talk to. It has been called the best known and most powerful of the Muslim organisations founded since 1990.

The Secretary General is Dr Wajid Akhter, as of 2025.

== History ==
The Muslim Council of Britain (MCB) was formed in 1994 in response to an expressed wish by the British government for a single representative body of Muslims that it could talk to. The core of the organisation was made up of Muslim professionals who had worked under the banner of UK Action Committee for Islamic Affairs (UKACIA). Once formed, the MCB had ready access to parliamentarians and policy makers. Its views were expressly sought by the government, civil servants and media channels.

=== 2001–2009 ===
The cosy relationship with the government soured after the September 11 attacks, when the British government was looking to MCB for support of its participation in the war in Afghanistan. But MCB opposed the war, based on its affiliates' wishes, and temporarily fell out of favour with the government. Thus began a strange love-hate relationship between the MCB and the government, say Peter Morey and Amina Yaqin.

Between 2001 and 2006, the MCB refused to send an official representative to attend the Holocaust Memorial Day commemorations. Threatened with derecognition and withdrawal of some funds, it sent representatives in 2007. However, after the 2009 Israeli offensive in Gaza, MCB reverted to its original policy, receiving renewed aspersions about its lack of commitment to multiculturalism and to tackling extremism.

In 2009, Daud Abdullah, the deputy general secretary of MCB, signed a declaration in Istanbul which called for a jihad in response to the Israeli assault on Gaza and endorsed Hamas attacks on foreign troops, including possibly British troops. The government asked Abdullah to step down and, when he declined, suspended its formal relationship with MCB. Following MCB's categorical assurances the following year that it did not support attacks on British troops and that Abdullah's signing of the declaration was in personal capacity, the government lifted the suspension, but not long before the Labour Party lost power in the 2010 election. The Conservative-Liberal Democrat coalition that came to power in 2010 tacitly reinstated the non-engagement policy, which continues to this day. (Note: MCB claimed that it had met ministers belonging to the Liberal Democratic Party during the term of the coalition, though not the Conservative Party.)

According to scholar Toby Archer, the break had been imminent since 2006. The 2005 London bombings showed the government that its existing engagement policies were not successful, and MCB's channelling of the Muslim anger against British foreign policy, including the Iraq War, made it appear disloyal to the government. After the 2006 election, a new Ministry of Communities and Local Government was created; Ruth Kelly, the minister, started talking to alternative Muslim voices and came to the conclusion that MCB was not representative of the Muslim viewpoint in general.

=== 2009–2021 ===
Harun Khan elected to the position of Secretary General in 2016; he was the first British-born Secretary General of the organisation, and was the youngest person to be elected into the role. He was re-elected in 2018 as Secretary General, for a further 2-year term.

=== After 2021 ===
In 2021, Zara Mohammed, the Assistant Secretary General, was elected Secretary General of the organisation after receiving the majority of affiliate votes over her competitor, Ajmal Masroor. This was the first time a woman had held the position; Mohammed was additionally the youngest, as well as the first Pakistani-Scottish, person to serve in the role.

On 19 February 2021, Mohammed met with the Paymaster General, Penny Mordaunt, breaking with the 2009 non-engagement policy.

In January 2025, at the conclusion of Mohammed's term, she was succeeded by Dr Wajid Akhter.

In July 2026, Dr Wajid Akhter was re-elected to serve another two years, with Maswood Ahmed as his Deputy Secretary General.

== Organisation ==
The MCB is an umbrella body with more than 500 Muslim organisations as its affiliates, which include mosques, schools and charities. The leaders are elected once every two years by the affiliate organisations.

Most of the affiliate organisations are small, but some are organisations of national prominence, such as the Muslim Association of Britain (MAB). The MCB is said to be dominated by groups that have their roots in "anti-colonial political Islam from Middle East and South Asia", in particular Pakistan, Bangladesh and Arab countries. According to The Economist, the Islamists from these countries held a big share of the top positions. Other commentators state that it was influenced initially by followers of Jamaat-e-Islami, a radical Islamist organisation in South Asia. But this influence is seen to be reducing, with younger British-born activists coming through.

The Secretary General from 1997 to 2006, Iqbal Sacranie, received a knighthood in the 2005 Queen's Birthday Honours for his longstanding service to the community and interfaith dialogue.

=== Funding ===
The MCB's core administrative expenses are funded entirely by affiliation fees from members, as well as donations from individuals and grant-giving organisations. The MCB also runs projects to raise the capability of British Muslim communities and to widen good practice. All MCB projects self-fundraise through sponsorship, donations or grants, and MCB does not have a central 'pot' of money to fund internal or externally-led projects.

In 2005, the MCB received a project-specific £150,000 Government grant for a number of specific projects. These were: the MCB leadership development programme; the MCB leadership mentoring programme; MCB direct, a web portal for information on Islam and Muslims; a British citizenship programme; and the British Muslim Equality Programme. The MCB had requested £500,000 and was criticised for accepting even the lower actual figure because it might be perceived as threatening its independent status.

=== Campaigns and projects ===
- Towards Greater Understanding is a 2007 document produced by the MCB "intended to be used, as a source of reference by schools when reviewing their policies and practices in relation to meeting the needs of their South-Asian Muslim pupils". The report claims to be an attempt at education because "South-Asian Muslims are experiencing racism and Islamophobia both personally and institutionally through forms of marginalisation, discrimination, prejudice and stereotyping".
- Visit My Mosque day: Facilitated by the MCB first in 2005, this initiative encourages mosques across the UK to hold open days at the same time. In 2016 over 80 mosques took part, including mosques in England, Scotland, Wales and Northern Ireland; the figure exceeded 200 in February 2018.
- Women in Mosques Development Programme, which provided one-to-one mentoring and specialised governance workshops to accelerate the inclusion of women in leadership, trustee, and operational roles across UK Islamic institutions. Regarding the limited number of Muslim women on trustee or management boards of mosques, the MCB stated that "the lack of diversity is unacceptable".This focus on female empowerment was further cemented during Zara Mohammed's tenure (2021–2025), during which the MCB prioritised cultivating future leaders and empowering women and youth to assume leadership positions.
- Voter Registration 2024 - Present: In 2024, supported by funding from the Joseph Rowntree Foundation, the MCB launched a nationwide campaign to increase voter registration within Muslim communities, mobilising 250 mosques and hosting regional registration drives.
- Mental Health Advocacy: In July 2026, alongside its Annual General Meeting (AGM) in London, the MCB co-hosted a major Muslim Mental Health Conference at the University of East London. The summit brought together practitioners and charities to advocate for culturally sensitive psychological support and healthcare accessibility for minority groups.

== Views ==
The MCB condemned the 2003 invasion of Iraq as "a massive disconnect between public opinion – including Muslim opinion – on the one side and the political classes on the other". The group condemns terrorism by Muslims and non-Muslims alike and has urged Muslims to help in the fight against terrorism. Nevertheless, though the MCB has unequivocally condemned terrorism committed by Muslims against Jews and Jewish targets both in Britain and in other countries, it has never condemned Islamic terrorism against Jews in Israel or in the Palestinian territories. Following allegations that police had wire-tapped a Muslim member of parliament, the Council said it was vital "to hold to account the improper behaviour of senior police officers."

In 2004, the MCB criticised Cardinal Cormac Murphy-O'Connor, head of the Catholic Church of England and Wales, when he said that Muslim leaders were not doing enough to denounce terrorists who carried out attacks "in the name of Allah", while clarifying that they denounced terrorism.

Following the 7 July 2005 London bombings, the MCB issued statements expressing its disgust at the events: "All of us must unite in helping the police to capture these murderers."

In February 2006, the MCB urged MPs to vote for the House of Lords' amendment to the Terrorism Act 2006, which removed the "glorification of terrorism" clause from the bill. They stated that the bill was perceived as "unfairly targeting Muslims and stifling legitimate debate". The bill was eventually passed without the amendment by 315 votes to 277. The opposition of the council to the clause and to British policy in Iraq attracted both praise and criticism. Sunny Hundal wrote in an exchange with Iqbal Sacranie: "In order to defeat violent extremism, we must understand what motivates these people and what turns them into killers. What puts them in that frame of mind? The Iraq War alone is not enough." He also criticised what he saw as close links between the MCB and the Labour Party. Sacranie conceded that "propaganda literature may well play a role", but emphasised: "such propaganda can only be effective because of the conducive atmosphere we have helped create."

The MCB has co-operated with trade unions and issued a joint statement with the Trades Union Congress urging better community relations and encouraging Muslims to join trade unions.

On 3 March 2008, the MCB criticised the Foreign Secretary David Miliband's response to Israel's killing of over 100 Palestinians in Gaza as "blatantly one-sided." It said, "If we are serious about wanting peace, we must act as honest brokers, not partisan bystanders."

When schoolteacher Gillian Gibbons was jailed in Sudan for allowing her class to name a teddy bear Muhammad, the same as the Muslim prophet, the MCB condemned the incident as "a gross overreaction" and said the Sudanese authorities lacked basic common sense.

Following the fatal bombing of Manchester Arena in May 2017, MCB Secretary General Harun Khan condemned the attack, saying "This is horrific, this is criminal. May the perpetrators face the full weight of justice both in this life and the next."

== Controversies ==
=== Reservations ===
MCB's claims of being representative of British Muslims have been questioned. Since 2009, successive British governments have maintained a policy of "non-engagement" with the Muslim Council of Britain based on claims that the group is not sufficiently representative and that some of its former officials have made favourable remarks about extremists in the past.

=== Holocaust ===
Between 2001 and 2007, the Muslim Council of Britain (MCB) expressed its unwillingness to attend the Holocaust Memorial Day ceremony and associated events. In a press release dated 26 January 2001 the Council listed two points of contention that prevented them from attending the event, which were that it "totally excludes and ignores the ongoing genocide and violation of Human Rights in the occupied Palestinian territories, in Jammu and Kashmir and elsewhere" and that "It includes the controversial question of alleged Armenian genocide as well as the so-called gay genocide."

Since 2007, the MCB has called for the day to be replaced by a "Genocide Memorial Day". On 3 December 2007, the MCB voted to end the boycott. Assistant general secretary Inayat Bunglawala argued it was "inadvertently causing hurt to some in the Jewish community". It drew criticism; for example Anas al-Tikriti said: "rather than a mere remembrance of victims of one of the most heinous crimes in history", Holocaust Memorial Day has "become a political event" which "glorifies the state of Israel, turning a collective blind eye to the immeasurable suffering of Palestinians at the hands of Israelis every single day."

=== Sectarianism ===
Historically, MCB has routinely spoken out against sectarianism. In 2013, the council signed an intra-faith unity declaration between a number of Islamic schools and branches within both Sunni and Shia denominations of Islam.

The MCB has been criticised by journalist Martin Bright, among others, for failing to be truly representative. He said, in response to an article by Madeleine Bunting: "any body that represents itself as speaking for the Muslim community must demonstrate that it is entirely non-sectarian and non-factional. The MCB has consistently failed in this area and the Government should consider cutting all ties until it has thoroughly reformed itself." Bunting disagreed, saying: "To the extent that the government over-relied on the MCB, it was due to the laziness of the government wanting only to hear one voice". She said it would be "absurd to exclude the MCB, the biggest Muslim organisation in this country and the one that has achieved the greatest degree of non-factionalism and non-sectarianism."

=== Homosexuality ===
The MCB opposed the 2003 repeal of Section 28, which prohibited the "promotion of homosexuality" by local authorities, on the grounds that presenting "homosexual practice as equivalent to marriage or in a morally neutral way is deeply offensive to Muslims" and that a repeal "undermines the institution of the family and will damage the fabric of our society". Yet, in April 2007, the Muslim Council of Britain issued a statement supporting the government legislation "prohibiting discrimination in the provision of goods and services on grounds of sexual orientation".

On 3 January 2006, Iqbal Sacranie told BBC Radio 4's PM programme he believes homosexuality is "not acceptable" and denounced same-sex civil partnerships as "harmful". Gay rights campaigners, such as Peter Tatchell, called for a "dialogue" between the MCB and gay organisations. In April 2007, the MCB formally declared its support for the Equality Act, which outlaws discrimination on the grounds of sexual orientation. The journalist Brian Whitaker said: "the Muslim Council of Britain has begun to move towards accepting homosexuality".

=== Schools and education ===
MCB guidance for schools says that parents of Muslim children should be allowed to withdraw their children from school activities involving mixed swimming, dance, sex and relationship education, music, drama, and figurative drawing on religious grounds. On farm visits, touching or feeding pigs should be prohibited. It also warns that pupils and parents may refuse to shake hands with the opposite sex during prize-giving ceremonies. The Daily Express newspaper referred to the publication as demanding "Taleban-style" conditions. It said music lessons were unacceptable to around 10% of Muslim pupils.

Based on information from the MCB, Stoke-on-Trent City Council issued a Ramadan guide to all schools. The document said schools should reschedule swimming lessons (to avoid swallowing water), sex education and examinations (as Ramadan can disrupt sleeping patterns and concentration) so they are outside the month of Ramadan.

=== Jyllands-Posten Muhammad cartoons controversy ===
When editorial cartoons of Muhammad were printed in the Danish daily newspaper Jyllands-Posten on 30 September 2005, the MCB saw them as reflecting "the emergence of an increasingly xenophobic tone being adopted towards Muslims in parts of the Western media" and argued, "We should not allow our valued freedoms in Europe to be abused by those deliberately seeking to provoke hatred and division between communities". At the same time, it said they regarded "the violent threats made against Danish and EU citizens by some groups in the Muslim world as completely unacceptable."

=== Istanbul Declaration controversy ===
In March 2009, The Observer reported that people including Daud Abdullah, the Deputy Secretary General of the MCB, had signed what has become known as the Istanbul Declaration (not to be confused with the 2004 Istanbul summit) in January of that year. This was in reaction to Israeli military action in Gaza of December 2008 and January 2009 (Operation Cast Lead). As reported, the Declaration implored the "Islamic Nation" to oppose by any means all individuals deemed supportive of the "Zionist enemy" (meaning Israel). At the time of signing, political leaders, including the British Prime Minister, Gordon Brown had suggested providing peacekeeping naval forces to monitor arms-smuggling between Gaza and Egypt.

Hazel Blears, then Secretary of State for Communities and Local Government in the UK, published an open letter saying the government would have no further dealings with the MCB until it distanced itself from the declaration and Abdullah resigned. Abdullah responded in The Guardian by describing her remarks as a "misguided and ill-advised attempt to exercise control." He later said he intended to sue Blears for libel if she did not retract her letter and apologise.

=== Islamophobia in the Conservative Party ===
The Muslim Council of Britain has repeatedly demanded an investigation into Islamophobia in the Conservative Party. In June 2018, the organisation said there are now "more than weekly incidents" involving Conservative candidates and representatives. In an open letter, the organisation told chairman Brandon Lewis he must "ensure racists and bigots have no place" in the party. The Conservative Muslim Forum accused the Conservative Party of a failure to take action on Islamophobia and joined calls for an independent inquiry. In addition, 350 mosques and 11 umbrella organisations across the UK have urged the Conservatives to launch internal inquiry into Islamophobia claims. In July, the organisation repeated its call for an independent inquiry into Islamophobia and accused the Conservatives of turning blind eye to Islamophobia claims.

=== Unfair media coverage ===
In July 2019, The Muslim Council of Britain began to launch a "campaign in Parliament for fairer media coverage". After viewing over 10,000 articles and TV clips, the MCB suggested that 43% of media clips portray Muslims with a negative association. In regards to Muslims, the British media "tended to focus on a narrow range of issues and recurrent, negative types of characterization". The MCB also condemned the BBC drama series Bodyguard, stating that it "pandered to stereotypes of Muslim women who wear the hijab as oppressed or subservient".

== See also ==
- Islam in the United Kingdom
- Festival of Muslim Cultures
- Muhammad Abdul Bari

== Bibliography ==
- Archer, Toby (September 2009), "Welcome to the "Umma": The British State and its Muslim Citizens Since 9/11", Cooperation and Conflict, 44 (3): 329–347, doi:10.1177/0010836709106219, JSTOR 45084578
- Duffy, Liam (2019), The 'No True Muslim' Fallacy: How Muslims are intimidated and marginalised for supporting counter-extremism initiatives (PDF), Civitas
- Morey, Peter; Yaqin, Amina (2011). Framing Muslims. Harvard University Press. pp. 82–85. ISBN 9780674048522.
- Phillips, Trevor; Jenkins, John; Frampton, Martyn (2019), On Islamophobia (PDF), Policy Exchange, ISBN 978-1-910812-70-9
